= List of DC Multiverse worlds =

List of alternate universes set in the DC Comics media

The DC Multiverse is a fictional continuity construct used in numerous DC Comics publications. The Multiverse has undergone numerous changes since its introduction and has included various universes, listed below between the original Multiverse and its successors.

== The original Multiverse ==
Earths that were "revealed as a distinct parallel Earth in The Kingdom #2", i.e., part of Hypertime, are marked with an asterisk. Variations of some of these worlds appeared in the 52 and New 52 Multiverses, which are also Hypertime realities.

Designation	Era	Notable Inhabitants	Notes	First appearance
Earth-Zero	Infinite Crisis	Earth-Zero is populated by Bizarro versions of various DC characters	Earth-Zero's only appearance was in a single panel in Infinite Crisis #6. It is a homage to Htrae, the Bizarro World, with its population of Bizarros and its cubical shape. The original Bizarro World was not a parallel Earth, but another planet that existed in the same universe as Earth-One.; This was one of the proposed names for the post-Zero Hour DC Universe after a somewhat definitive timeline was established.	Infinite Crisis #6 (May 2006)
Earth-One	Pre-Crisis	DC's Silver Age heroes, including the original Justice League of America: the Flash, Green Lantern, Hawkman, the Atom, and Superman.	The default Earth for most of DC's comics during the time the original DC Multiverse construct was in use, Earth-One was by far the most populated and explored, and it retained dominance over the other worlds which were merged with it (Earth-Two, Earth-Four, Earth-S, and Earth-X) during Crisis on Infinite Earths.	More Fun Comics #101 (January 1945) The Earth-One Batman and Gotham City first appeared in Detective Comics #327 (May 1964)
Earth-Two	Pre-Crisis	DC's Golden Age heroes, including the Justice Society of America: the Flash, Green Lantern, Hawkman, the Atom, and Superman.	Politically, Earth-Two was different from the Earth-One template modeled after Earth-Prime. For example, Quebec was an independent nation autonomous from Canada, South Africa had abolished apartheid sooner, and the Atlantean countries of Poseidonis and Tritonis were both ruled by a queen, not a king, their inhabitants displaying surface-dweller features and no capacity for underwater survival, as the Atlantis continent had been raised to the surface.; Hypertime version called Earth-2	New Fun Comics #1 (February 1935); retconned to The Flash #123 (September 1961)
Alternate Earth-Two (Earth-Two-A)	Pre-Crisis	A variant of DC's Golden Age Superman and possibly other heroes	Clark Kent worked for the Daily Planet under editor Perry White in the 1940s and 1950s. On the regular Earth-Two, Kent worked for the Daily Star, his editor was George Taylor, and White was a reporter.; Suggested by E. Nelson Bridwell in the Superman Family letters page to explain inconsistencies in 1940s and 1950s Superman stories with Earth-Two history	debatable
Earth-Three	Pre-Crisis	The Crime Syndicate of America, evil versions of the Earth-One heroes (Ultraman, Owlman, Superwoman, Power Ring, Johnny Quick); the heroic Alexander Luthor; and briefly his son, Alexander Luthor Jr.	History was "backwards": American Christopher Columbus discovered Europe; Great Britain won its freedom from the United States; President John Wilkes Booth was assassinated by actor Abraham Lincoln; the United States flag's colors were reversed: black stars on a red field, with alternating blue and black stripes; and all superheroes are supervillains and vice versa.; A Hypertime version of Earth-Three was seen in Another Nail	Justice League of America #29 (August 1964)
Earth-Four	Crisis on Infinite Earths	The former Charlton Comics heroes: Captain Atom, Blue Beetle, Nightshade, Peacemaker, Question, Thunderbolt (Peter Cannon) and Judomaster	This Earth was introduced at the beginning of Crisis, and disappeared less than a year later, when it merged with the four other surviving Earths (Earth-One, Earth-Two, Earth-S, and Earth-X).; Hypertime versions called Earth-4 and Earth 4	Yellowjacket #1 (1944)
Earth-Five	Pre-Crisis	Bruce Wayne	Transported by the Phantom Stranger to a universe with no Krypton and no superheroes, the Earth-One Batman prevents the murders of the Earth-Five versions of his parents. Intrigued with and in gratitude of his Earth-One counterpart's actions, this Earth's Bruce Wayne is inspired to become a hero in a similar guise as his family's rescuer.	"To Kill a Legend" from Detective Comics #500 (March 1981)
Earth-Six	Crisis on Infinite Earths	Lady Quark, Lord Volt and their daughter Princess Fern	Earth-Six is apparently ruled by a royal family of superheroes. On this Earth, America lost the Revolutionary War, and technology appears to have advanced more rapidly than on Earth-One. Earth-Six was destroyed in Crisis, with only Lady Quark surviving.	Crisis on Infinite Earths #4 (June 1985)
Earth-Seven	Infinite Crisis	The Dark Angel, an evil analogue of Donna Troy	The Anti-Monitor saved the Dark Angel, just as the Monitor had saved her good counterpart Harbinger. The only known survivor of Earth-Seven, Dark Angel escaped the compression of the Multiverse to torment Donna Troy across several lifetimes.	DC Special: The Return of Donna Troy #4 (October 2005)
Earth-Eight	Infinite Crisis	Breach, Firestorm (Jason Rusch), Green Lantern (Kyle Rayner), and Huntress (Helena Bertinelli)	Home to DC characters created after Crisis on Infinite Earths.	Infinite Crisis #5 (April 2006)
Earth-Eleven	Pre-Crisis	"Tin"	Home to "Tin", a robot. A nuclear war devastated this Earth in 1966.	Teen Titans Spotlight #11 (June 1987)
Earth-Twelve	Pre-Crisis	The Inferior Five	This Earth may have been home to other comedic superheroes published by DC. Additionally, references within the series pointed to versions of Justice League members having existed in that universe.; Was stated as being separate from Earth-B or part of "Earth-B"; A brief glimpse of a Hypertime version of this Earth is seen in Another Nail	Showcase #62 (June 1966)
Earth-Fourteen	Pre-Crisis	Purple butterflies	Mentioned in Animal Man, where purple butterflies are an "Earth-14 species"	Animal Man #24 (June 1990)
Earth-Fifteen	Pre-Crisis	Stone Giants		Justice League of America #15 (November 1962)
Earth-Seventeen	Post-Crisis	Overman	An Earth based around the "grim 'n gritty" stories of the 1980s, the heroes of this Earth were part of an experiment created by the government. The inhabitants of this Earth were Overman (Superman's counterpart), who went mad and destructive after contracting a sexually transmitted infection, a black and muscular Wonder Woman, an unnamed Flash and a punk-style Green Lantern.	Animal Man #23 (May 1990)
Earth-Twenty-Three	Post-Crisis	Superboy, Supergirl	A pocket reality created by the Time Trapper as part of an elaborate plan to destroy the Legion of Super-Heroes. Three Phantom Zone criminals destroyed all life on this universe's Earth, with the Matrix Supergirl being the only survivor.	Legion of Super-Heroes (vol. 3) #23 (June 1986)
Earth-25G	Infinite Crisis	Unknown	One of three Earths named by Alexander Luthor in Infinite Crisis in his search for the perfect Earth; no information is provided	Infinite Crisis #6 (May 2006)
Earth-Twenty Seven	Post-Crisis	The Angel Mob, Animal Man, Batman, B'wana Beast, Envelope Girl, Front Page, Green Cigarette, the Human Vegetable, Notional Man and Nowhere Man	Home of versions of Animal Man, Batman, and B'wana Beast and many historical divergences, such as Adolf Hitler being hanged for his war crimes and Ted Kennedy dying at Chappaquiddick. The American government is corrupt and extremely right-wing.; The Buddy Baker of the post-Crisis Earth could only exist on this Earth in the body and mind of that Earth's Buddy Baker and could only leave by killing his parallel self,	Animal Man #27 (September 1990)
Earth-Thirty-Two	Pre-Crisis	Almost exact counterparts of Green Lantern (Hal Jordan), Carol Ferris and others.	After Carol Ferris professed her love for Hal Jordan instead of Green Lantern and accepted his marriage proposal, the Earth-One Green Lantern eventually figured out that he had shifted into a parallel universe, which he compared to Earth-Two and Earth-Three.	Green Lantern (vol. 2) #32 (October 1964)
Earth-Forty*	Pre-Crisis	Captain Thunder, Superman, Wonder Woman, Batman	Billy Batson has the identity of Captain Thunder, Superboy was raised in Metropolis, Wonder Woman fought in World War II and Bruce Wayne retired in the mid-1960s to make way for a new Batman and Robin team	Thrill Comics #1 (1940)
Earth-Forty-Three	Pre-Crisis	Superman, Lex Luthor, Lois Lane	An Earth where Superman and Luthor died in their final battle; Superman was replaced by a Kandorian and eventually switched with the Superman of Earth-215	Superman's Girlfriend, Lois Lane #43 (August 1963)
Earth-Forty-Six (Earth-B2)	Pre-Crisis	unknown	The hardcover book Crisis on Infinite Earths: Absolute Edition (November 2005) has "See Earth-46" under the Earth-B2 entry, but there is not a listing for Earth-Forty-Six in the index. As a result, details of this reality are unknown.	unknown
Earth-Forty-Seven	Pre-Crisis	Krypton Girl (Lois Lane), Clark Kent	As Krypton Girl, Lois Lane of Krypton quickly tires of Clark Kent's attempts at finding out her secret identity and sends him to the Phantom Zone.	Superman's Girlfriend, Lois Lane #47 (February 1964)
Earth-Fifty-One	Pre-Crisis	Superman, Lois Lane, Lana Lang and Lori Lemaris	Superman marries Lois Lane, Lana Lang and Lori Lemaris, who all tragically die after the wedding.	Superman's Girlfriend, Lois Lane #51 (August 1964)
Earth-54	Pre-Crisis	Tommy Tomorrow	A technologically advanced Earth where Tommy Tomorrow became the first man on Mars in 1960	Real Fact Comics #6 (January 1947)
Earth-57	Pre-Crisis	Superman, Lois Lane, Lana Lang	Superman is married to both Lois Lane and Lana Lang; Jimmy Olsen is married to Supergirl	Superman's Pal Jimmy Olsen #57 (December 1961)
Earth-59	Pre-Crisis	Alternate Wonder Woman named Tara Terruna and Duke Dazam	The first parallel Earth to be featured in DC Comics was visited by the Earth-Two Wonder Woman, who worked with her counterpart to battle the conqueror Duke Dazam. This Earth appeared to be technologically less advanced than Earth-Two, with Dazam's navy using oar-powered ships.	Wonder Woman #59 (May 1953)
Earth-61	Elseworlds	Barbara Gordon (Batgirl/Robin), Detective Duell (Two-Face), Hayley Fitzpatrick (Harley Quinn), Richart Gruastark/Dick Grayson (Robin), Bianca Steeplechase (the Joker), and Bruce Wayne (Batman)	An Earth where Barbara Gordon and her boyfriend Richart Graustark become Batgirl and Robin in 1961 and fight against corrupt cops and other establishment types led by the white-faced Bianca Steeplechase, a.k.a. the Joker, who later kills Richart. Detective Bruce Wayne, who has been framed for murder, then becomes Batman and Barbara later assumes the Robin mantle while seeking revenge for her lover's death.; Bruce Wayne's family lost their fortune during the Great Depression and Wayne Manor is now owned by Barbara.	Batgirl & Robin: Thrillkiller #1 (January 1997)
Earth-64	Pre-Crisis	Superman, Lex Luthor, Lois Lane	Under the name Lexo, concert pianist Luthor marries Lois Lane shortly before his death.	Superman's Girlfriend, Lois Lane #64–65 (April–May 1966)
Earth-72	Pre-Crisis	Prez Rickard	Elected in 1972, Prez serves two terms and then drops out of sight	Prez: The First Teen President #1 (August–September 1973)
Earth-85	Post-Crisis	Variant Post-Crisis DC characters, Shade, the Changing Man	This Earth involves out-of-continuity Post-Crisis stories involving Captain Marvel and Hawkman.; Home to the version of Shade, the Changing Man from the Vertigo series by Peter Milligan and Chris Bachalo.	Shazam: The New Beginning #1 (April 1987)
Earth-86 (Earth-AD)	Pre-Crisis	The Atomic Knights, Hercules, Kamandi, and One-Man Army Corps (O.M.A.C.)	An Earth that was ravaged by an atomic war in the year 1986; The Atomic Knights part exists in the Hypertime versions called Earth-17 and Earth 17	Strange Adventures #117 (June 1960)
Earth-89	Pre-Crisis	Lois Lane, Superman, Batman	An Earth where Lois Lane married Batman.	Superman's Girlfriend, Lois Lane #89 (January 1969)
Earth-91	Pre-Crisis	Lois Lane, Superman	An Earth where a blind Lois Lane marries Superman and they have a super-daughter before Superman is disfigured by a mixture of green and red kryptonite.	Superman's Girlfriend, Lois Lane #91 (April 1969)
Earth-95	Pre-Crisis	Jor-El, Lara Lor-Van, Superboy	Jor-El and Lara enlarge their rocket ship so that they and their son Kal-El can all go to Earth.	Superboy #95 (March 1962)
Earth-96*	Elseworlds	Older versions of the Post-Crisis heroes	A future timeline, in which Superman has been retired for 10 years, following events which severed his ties to humanity. To deal with a new, often lawless generation of heroes, Superman reforms the Justice League, a gathering of power which concerns a non-powered group of humans led by Lex Luthor. He later settles down with Wonder Woman and they have a son.; Slightly divergent Hypertime versions called Earth-22 and Earth 22	Kingdom Come #1 (May 1996)
Earth-97*	Elseworlds	Characters shown in the "Tangent Comics" 1997 event	The Tangent characters were radically re-envisioned solely on the basis of the existing DC trademark.; Hypertime versions called Earth-9 and Earth 9	DC's first of two "Tangent Comics" events (1997)
Earth-116	Pre-Crisis	Superboy	Daine Jensen, a.k.a. Superboy, fights a wild Lemur Man.	Superboy #116 (October 1964)
Earth-117	Pre-Crisis	Jor-El, Lara, Kal-El	Jor-El, Lara, and Kal-El all survive Krypton's destruction and capes are a status symbol.	Superman's Pal Jimmy Olsen #117 (January 1969)
Earth-124.1*	Pre-Crisis	Wonder Woman, Wonder Girl, Wonder Tot	An Earth where Wonder Woman, Wonder Girl and Wonder Tot are three separate people.; Called "Earth-124" in The Essential Wonder Woman Encyclopedia (2010)	Wonder Woman #124 (August 1961)
Earth-124.2	Pre-Crisis	Superboy	In order to better conceal his identity as Superboy, this Earth's version of Clark Kent masqueraded as a bully.	Superboy #124 (October 1965)
Earth-127	Pre-Crisis	Batman, Wonder Woman	Batman became a crime fighter after defeating the Blue Bat.; Wonder Woman and Steve Trevor marry, with disastrous results.	Batman #127 (October 1959)
Earth-132	Pre-Crisis	Futuro	An Earth where astronauts land on the home of Futuro, Krypton.	Superman #132 (October 1959)
Earth-134	Pre-Crisis	Superboy	An Earth where Superboy abandoned Earth after red kryptonite turned him evil.	Superboy #134 (December 1966)
Earth-136	Pre-Crisis	Bruce (Superman) Wayne, Vicki Vale	An Earth without a Batman.	World's Finest Comics #136 (September 1963)
Earth-146	Pre-Crisis	Atlantis	An Earth where the Earth-One Superman prevented Atlantis from sinking and evacuated the population of Krypton to Earth.	Superman #146 (July 1961)
Earth-148	Pre-Crisis	Clayface, Luthor, Mirror Master, Batman, the Flash, Superman, Wonder Woman	An Earth where Clayface, Luthor and the Mirror Master are heroes and Batman, the Flash, Superman and Wonder Woman are villains.	World's Finest Comics #148 (March 1965)
Earth-149	Pre-Crisis	Superman, Lex Luthor	An Earth in which Lex Luthor succeeded in killing Superman.	Superman #149 (November 1961)
Earth-154	Pre-Crisis	A close variation of the Super-Sons' Earth, Earth-216		World's Finest Comics #154 (December 1965)
Earth-159	Pre-Crisis	Lois Lane	This Earth's only survivor, Lois Lane, is rocketed to Krypton.	Superman #159 (February 1963)
Earth-162*	Pre-Crisis	Superman Red/Superman Blue	An Earth home to Superman Red, who married Lana Lang and Superman Blue, who married Lois Lane. They were created when a device Superman made to increase his intelligence a hundredfold split him into two beings.	Superman #162 (July 1963)
Earth-166	Pre-Crisis	Superman	An Earth where Superman has twins; one with superpowers, the other without.	Superman #166 (January 1964)
Earth-167	Pre-Crisis	Superman, Batman	An Earth where Lex Luthor is Superman and Clark Kent is Batman.	World's Finest Comics #167 (June 1967)
Earth-170	Pre-Crisis	Lex Luthor	An Earth where Lex Luthor tried to prevent Jor-El and Lara from marrying.	Superman #170 (May 1964)
Earth-172	Pre-Crisis	Superman, Batman, and the Legion of Super-Heroes	An Earth where Bruce Wayne was adopted by the Kents and became Clark's brother, soon joining him as the crimefighting team of Superboy and Batboy, then later emigrating to Gotham, where Clark Kent becomes employed at the Gotham Gazette. As Batman, Wayne relocates to the Legion of Super-Heroes' 30th century.	World's Finest Comics #172 (December 1967)
Earth-175	Pre-Crisis	Superman, Lex Luthor, Pete Ross	An Earth where Lex Luthor is Clark Kent's foster brother and Pete Ross is Superman's greatest foe.	Superman #175 (February 1965)
Earth-178	Pre-Crisis	Superman as Nova	An Earth where Superman lost his powers and adopted the identity of Nova.	World's Finest Comics #178 (September 1968)
Earth-183	Pre-Crisis	Karkan, Lord of the Jungle	The Superman of this Earth was raised by apes in Africa as Karkan, Lord of the Jungle.	Superboy #183 (March 1972)
Earth-184	Pre-Crisis	Superman, Batman, Robin	An Earth where Robin is the caretaker for a mentally impaired Batman and a blind Superman.	World's Finest Comics #184 (May 1969)
Earth-192	Pre-Crisis	Clark Kent, Lois Lane	An Earth where Superman loses his powers, marries Lois and together they have a superpowered son.	Superman #192 (January 1967)
Earth-200	Pre-Crisis	Superman, Hyperman	An Earth where Hyperman is Kal-El and Superman is Knor-El, due to Kryptonopolis being taken by Brainiac.	Superman #200 (October 1967)
Earth-215	Pre-Crisis	Superman	An Earth where Superman married Lois Lane and had a daughter; After the death of his wife at the hands of the Dimension Master, who is later killed by Lex Luthor and Brainiac (because they respect Superman), Superman exchanges places with Earth-Forty-Three's Superman so that he can marry this Earth's Lois Lane.	Superman #215 (April 1969)
Earth-216*	Pre-Crisis	Superman Jr. (Clark Kent Jr.) and Batman Jr. (Bruce Wayne Jr.), the Super-Sons, younger versions of their superhero fathers	The son of Clark Kent and Lois Lane and the son of Bruce Wayne and Kathy Kane try to live up to or surpass their fathers' legacies, but usually end up arguing amongst themselves (or with their fathers) or causing trouble. Their final appearance in World's Finest Comics #263 claimed that the Super-Sons stories were merely computer simulations. This Earth is also identified as Earth-E.; Had a close variation called Earth-154	World's Finest Comics #215 (January 1973)
Earth-224	Pre-Crisis	Superman, Lois Lane	An Earth where Superman and Lois Lane married and had a son who temporarily became a super-genius.	Superman #224 (February 1970)
Earth-230	Pre-Crisis	Lex Luthor, Clark Kent	An Earth where Lex Luthor is a Kryptonian and fought a criminal Clark Kent.	Superman #230–231 (October–November 1970)
Earth-235	Post-Crisis	Real world versions of Superman, Batman and Wonder Woman	An Earth where real people are inspired to take up the names of comic book heroes.	Realworlds: Batman (2000)
Earth-238	Pre-Crisis	Variant Earth-One heroes	An Earth where everything (including printed media) is a mirror image of Earth-One.	Action Comics #238
Earth-247	Post-Zero Hour	Home to the 1994 incarnation of the Legion of Super-Heroes	Home to the 1994 incarnation of the Legion of Super-Heroes.	The Legion of Super-Heroes (vol. 4) #0 (October 1994)
Earth-260	Pre-Crisis	DC: The New Frontier characters	Characters shown in the DC: The New Frontier miniseries; Hypertime versions called Earth-21 and Earth 21	DC: The New Frontier #1 (March 2004)
Earth-265	Pre-Crisis	Cetaceans	An Earth where the inhabitants evolved from cetaceans.	The Flash #265 (September 1978)
Earth-270	Pre-Crisis	Steve Trevor	The Steve Trevor of this Earth landed on Earth-1.	Wonder Woman #270 (August 1980)
Earth-276	Pre-Crisis	Captain Thunder	Home of Captain Thunder, a copy of Captain Marvel who Superman fought soon after DC's 1970's Captain Marvel revival.	Superman #276 (June 1973)
Earth-295 (Earth-AD)	Pre-Crisis	Kamandi	A variant of Kamandi's Earth where the Great Disaster was caused by natural forces rather than an atomic war.	The Brave and the Bold #120 (July 1975)
Earth-300	Pre-Crisis	Skyboy, Superman	An Earth where Superman landed on Earth in 1976 and operated under the name Skyboy.	Superman #300 (June 1976)
Earth-300.6	Pre-Crisis	Superboy	An Earth where Superboy gave up both time and space travel after the deaths of his foster parents.	The Legion of Super-Heroes (vol. 2) #300
Earth-332	Pre-Crisis	Superwoman, Superboy	An Earth where Superman and Supergirl arrived in a reverse order than the one on Earth-1.	Action Comics #332–333 (January–February 1966)
Earth-353	Pre-Crisis	Superman	An Earth where Kal-El was adopted by Thomas and Martha Wayne and, after becoming Superman, married Barbara Gordon.	Superman #353 (November 1980)
Earth-354	Elseworlds	Batman (Bruce Wayne/Kal-El), Lois Lane, Alfred Pennyworth, Joker (Lex Luthor)	An Earth where Kal-El landed in Gotham and was adopted by the Waynes.	Superman: Speeding Bullets (1993)
Earth-377	Pre-Crisis	Terra-Man	A magical Earth.	Superman Spectacular #1 (1982)
Earth-383	Pre-Crisis	Joan of Arc, Isaac Newton, Abraham Lincoln, Supergirl	A negative Earth where people who are dead on Earth-One are alive.	Adventure Comics #383 (August 1969)
Earth-387	Pre-Crisis	Supergirl	An Earth where no divergences in history have occurred, except that every inhabitant of this Earth is a werewolf.	Adventure Comics #387 (December 1969)
Earth-388	Pre-Crisis	Variant Earth-One characters	This Earth briefly switched with Earth-One due to the actions of Professor Farlow Nurd.; In addition to having white oceans and dayglow continents, its inhabitants are altered Earth-One characters.; Superman and Lois Lane are married on this Earth.	Action Comics #388 (May 1970)
Earth-391	Pre-Crisis	Superman, Superman Jr., Batman	An Earth where Superman and Batman have sons, but Superman's son appears to be misusing his powers.	Action Comics #391–392 (August–September 1970)
Earth-395*	Elseworlds	Kal, Sir Bruce of Waynesmoor, King Arthur, Merlin, Morgan La Fey, Mordred, Lady Loisse, Jamie, Talia al Ghul, Ra's al Ghul and Baron Luthor	An Earth where Kal-El landed in medieval England and forged the sword Excalibur from the metal from his spacecraft; Sir Bruce of Waynesmoor, a.k.a. the Dark Knight, fought against Mordred and Ra's al Ghul until he was sealed in Avalon alongside King Arthur (they were awakened in World War II)	Superman: Kal (1995)
Earth-399	Pre-Crisis	Washington, Lincoln, Custer, Superman	An Earth where Superman was replaced by two clones.; Washington freed the slaves.; Lincoln was elected President for Life.; Custer was the chief of the Indian Federation.	Action Comics #399 (April 1971)
Earth-404	Pre-Crisis	Superboy	An Earth where Superboy loses his powers in a battle with Luthor.; Clark Kent marries Lana Lang.	Superman #404 (February 1985)
Earth-410	Pre-Crisis	Superman	An Earth where Superman married the alien witch Krysalla and had a son, Krys.	Action Comics #410 (March 1972)
Earth-417	Pre-Crisis	Superman	Superman landed on Mars, but would later arrive on this Earth	Superman #417 (March 1986)
Earth-423	Pre-Crisis	Superman, Batman, Lex Luthor, Brainiac, the Legion of Super-Heroes, Krypto the Superdog, Captain Marvel, Superwoman	The setting of Superman: Whatever Happened to the Man of Tomorrow?.	Superman #423 (September 1986) and Action Comics #583 (September 1986)
Earth-462	Infinite Crisis	Wonder Woman, Per Degaton, Baron Blitzkrieg, Captain Nazi and the original Teen Titans (Robin, Speedy, Kid Flash, Aqualad and Wonder Girl)	A Golden Age Earth still locked in World War II. The remaining Teen Titans (Speedy, Robin, Aqualad, and Kid Flash) were all depicted in militaristic uniforms.	Infinite Crisis #6 (May 2006)
Earth-494	Elseworlds	Alfredo, Capitana Felina, Captain Leatherwing, the Laughing Man and Robin Redblade	Home to Captain Leatherwing, a pirate who fought alongside Capitana Felina against the insane pirate the Laughing Man.	Detective Comics Annual #7 (October 1994)
Earth-508	Post-Infinite Crisis	Characters from DC Super Friends	The setting of the DC Super Friends toy line.	DC Super Friends #1 (May 2008)
Earth-523	Elseworlds	Depowered version heroes and villains	The setting of JLA: Act of God, where a strange energy removed everyone's superpowers.	JLA: Act of God #1 (November 2000)
Earth-677	Elseworlds	Fantasy version of the Justice League	A version of the Justice League that lives in a magical Earth.	League of Justice #1 (February 1996)
Earth-686	Post-Crisis	Characters shown in Frank Miller's The Dark Knight Returns and its various spin-off titles	This Earth's Batman is a dark vigilante who fights against crime and corruption, while Superman is a federal agent for the U.S. government	Batman: The Dark Knight Returns #1 (February 1986)
Earth-702	Elseworlds	Alternate version of the Justice League	An Earth where Thomas Wayne, as the result of his wife and son being killed in a robbery, creates the Justice League.	JLA: Destiny #1 (August 2002)
Earth-898*	Elseworlds	Variants of Post-Crisis Earth heroes	An Earth where the Kents' car ran over a nail and got a flat tire, resulting in Kal-El being raised by an Amish couple. As a result, Kal-El does not become Superman and join the Justice League until he is an adult.	JLA: The Nail #1–3 (August–October 1998)
Earth-898	Infinite Crisis	Western heroes Jonah Hex, Bat Lash, Scalphunter, El Diablo, Nighthawk, and Cinnamon	Earth-898 is a one-panel image of various Western heroes. There is no information regarding its connection (if any) to the Earth-898 of Crisis on Infinite Earths: Absolute Edition (November 2005) or its history.	Infinite Crisis #6 (May 2006)
Earth-901	Post-Crisis	Alternate versions of Superman, Green Lantern, the Flash and others	The setting of Just Imagine..., an alternate universe envisioned by Stan Lee.; Hypertime version is Earth 6	Infinite Crisis #6 (May 2006)
Earth-922	Elseworlds	Superman, Luthor and all DC female heroes and villains	A cosmic plague hits this Earth, killing all men except for Superman and Lex Luthor	JLA: Created Equal #1 (March 2000)
Earth-988	Post-Crisis	Superboy	An Earth that has a college-age Superboy as its only hero.; Based on the 1988 Superboy live-action television series.	Superboy (vol. 3) #1 (February 1990)
Earth-990	Post-Crisis	Clark Kent, Lois Chaudhari	The setting of Superman: Secret Identity, an analogue of the real world where a civilian named Clark Kent, after Superman, develops the powers of his namesake.	Superman: Secret Identity (2004)
Earth-1004	Elseworlds	Superman/Colin Clark (Kal-El), Louisa Layne-Ferret	An Earth where Kal-El landed in Weston-super-Mare.	Superman: True Brit (2004)
Earth-1098*	Elseworlds	Supergirl, Batgirl	An Earth where Supergirl and Batgirl are members of a Justice Society.	Elseworld's Finest: Supergirl and Batgirl (1998)
Earth-1099	Elseworlds	Catwoman, Batman, Two-Face (Darcy Dent), Killer Croc and Commissioner James Gordon	An Earth where a heroic Catwoman fought crime in Gotham City and married Bruce Wayne, unaware that he is actually the evil murderer Batman.	Catwoman: Guardian of Gotham #1 (August 1999)
Earth-1101	Elseworlds	Justice League	A high fantasy world that must contend with the return of the Beast (Etrigan).; The map of the world shows a totally different configuration of continents, a hint that the world that this happens on is not exactly "Earth".	JLA: Riddle of the Beast #1 (February 2002)
Earth-1163	Elseworlds	Superman, Wonder Woman	An Earth where Diana defected to the Axis powers, helping them win World War II, and Lois Lane becomes Wonder Woman.	Superman/Wonder Woman: Who Gods Destroy (1997)
Earth-1191	Elseworlds	Batman, Dracula, James Gordon, Alfred Pennyworth, the Joker, Two-Face, Killer Croc, and Catwoman	An Earth where Batman fought against Dracula and was subsequently turned into a vampire. He would later become evil and kill all of his enemies, until finally being destroyed by James Gordon and Alfred Pennyworth.; Hypertime versions are Earth-43 and Earth 43	Batman & Dracula: Red Rain (1991)
Earth-1198	Elseworlds	Darkseid and Kal-El	The rocket ship containing Kal-El diverted from its path to Earth and landed on Apokolips, where the tyrant Darkseid raised him and used him to help destroy New Genesis and conquer Earth, until Kal-El rebelled against him.	Superman: The Dark Side #1 (August 1998)
Earth-1289	Post-Crisis	Batman, Robin, the Riddler and Harvey Dent	An Earth where Batman and Robin fought the Riddler on their first formal case and where Harvey Dent was ultimately rehabilitated.	Batman Newspaper strip November 6, 1989; Comics Revue #41
Earth-1598* (Red Son)	Elseworlds	Soviet versions of Superman, Batman and Wonder Woman, along with an alternate version of the Green Lantern Corps	An Earth where Superman landed in a Soviet commune in Ukraine instead of Smallville.; Hypertime versions are Earth-30 and Earth 30	Superman: Red Son #1 (June 2003)
Earth-1863	Elseworlds	Abraham Lincoln, Superman	An Earth where Kryptonian Atticus Kent, a.k.a. Kal-El, a.k.a. Superman, ended the American Civil War in the year 1863 and prevented Abraham Lincoln's assassination.	Superman: A Nation Divided (1999)
Earth-1876	Elseworlds	Justice League	An Earth where the Justice League appeared in the 19th century.; Kal-El's rocket landed in Kansas in the 1850s and he made himself known to the public at the 1876 Centennial Exposition.; Luthor is a war profiteer who is eventually executed for treason.	JLA: Age of Wonder #1 (July 2003)
Earth-1888	Elseworlds	Aquaman (Delphinius), Flash (Jubatus), Wonder Woman (Dianna), Jack the Ripper, Black Lightning (Bernarus), Hawkman {Dirus Falconus}	An Earth where Dr. Moreau creates a Justifiers of the Law Anointed (Justice League of America), as well as Jack the Ripper, with his experiments.	JLA: Island of Dr. Moreau (September 2002)
Earth-1889	Elseworlds	Batman, Jack the Ripper	An Earth where Batman began his career in 1889 and fought against Jack the Ripper, who turns out to have been the man who orchestrated the deaths of his parents.	Gotham by Gaslight (February 1989)
Earth-1890	Elseworlds	The Justice Riders, consisting of several of DC's Western characters, including Super-Chief, Bat-Lash and El Diablo	Hypertime versions are Earth-18 and Earth 18.	Justice Riders (1997)
Earth-1927	Elseworlds	Clarc Kent-Son (the Super-Man), Lutor, Bruss Wayne-Son (the Nosferatu), and Diana (the Wonder-Woman)	Home of the clockwork city of Metropolis, where the Super-Man once fought Lutor and Bruss Wayne-Son took the alias of the Nosferatu; Inspired by three main classics of pre-World War II German expressionist cinema: Fritz Lang's Metropolis, F.W. Murnau's Nosferatu: A Symphony of Horror, and Josef von Sternberg's The Blue Angel	Superman's Metropolis (1996)
Earth-1938*	Elseworlds	Clark Kent, Lois Lane, Lex Luthor, and the Martians	An Earth where Clark Kent died to save the world from the invading forces of Mars in the year 1938.; World War II never occurred on this Earth, as Adolf Hitler was killed by the Martians in 1938.	Superman: War of the Worlds #1 (1999)
Earth-1968	Elseworlds	Kal-El (Clark Kent), Green Lantern Corps, Lois Lane	An Earth where Clark Kent was sent to Krypton, and later found a Green Lantern ring.	Superman: Last Son of Earth (2000)
Earth-2020	Pre-Crisis	Superman, Jorel Kent, Kalel Kent	An Earth with three generations of Supermen.	Superman #354 (December 1980)
Earth-2058	Pre-Crisis	Doc Strange, Black Terror, Tom Strong, Promethea	This Earth contains characters from Nedor Publishing/Better Publications/Standard Comics, and Alan Moore's America's Best Comics imprint.	Thrilling Comics #1 (February 1940)
Earth-3181	Infinite Crisis	Unknown	One of three Earths named by Alexander Luthor Jr. in Infinite Crisis in his search for the perfect Earth; no information is provided	Infinite Crisis #6 (May 2006)
Earth-3839*	Elseworlds	Superman and Batman; Captain America and Bucky	An Earth where Superman and Batman started their careers in the 1930s and started families that would follow in their superhero footsteps all the way to the 30th century.	Superman & Batman: Generations #1 (January 1999)
Earth-5050	Elseworlds	An alternate version of the JLA called the Kryptic Order	An alternate version of the JLA called the Kryptic Order; An Earth where the Kryptic Order operated in secret, acting as judge and jury for the criminals that it caught.	JLA: Secret Society of Super-Heroes #1 (2000)
Earth-A	Pre-Crisis	The Lawless League: alternate, evil versions of Superman (Ripper Jones), Batman (Bill Gore), the Flash (Race Morrison), Green Lantern (Monk Loomis), the Atom (Barney Judson), and the Martian Manhunter (Eddie Orson)	Johnny Thunder's evil Earth-One counterpart created Earth-A when he used Johnny's Thunderbolt to alter the origins of the Justice League, replacing them with his own henchmen, whom he granted powers and skills identical to the Justice League's. "A" stood for "alternate", since it was an alternate timeline of Earth-One	Justice League of America #37 (August 1965)
Earth-B	Pre-Crisis	Versions of various Earth-One and Earth-Two characters	This Earth was never specifically depicted, but was suggested to exist in a letters column by DC editor/writer Bob Rozakis as a possible explanation for certain non-continuity stories or character traits. Rozakis designated it "Earth-B" in reference to Murray Boltinoff and The Brave and the Bold. Earth-B was eventually expanded to out-of-continuity "Earth-One" stories edited by Boltinoff, written by Bob Haney or E. Nelson Bridwell, or appeared in The Brave and the Bold and World's Finest Comics.	Superboy #59 (September 1957) for Earth-Thirty-Two The Adventures of Bob Hope #94 (September 1965) for Earth-Twelve
Earth-C	Pre-Crisis	The Zoo Crew	This Earth is populated with anthropomorphic animals. The population also included the characters from many of DC's Golden and Silver Age talking animal comics (The Dodo and the Frog, Peter Porkchops, Funny Stuff, etc.). Historical heroes included the Golden Age superhero the Terrific Whatzit and the 17th century's the Three Mouseketeers; It was revealed in the Multiversity series that, due to its nature, this Earth's Hypertime versions are Earth-26 and Earth 26	The New Teen Titans #16 (February 1982)
Earth-C-Minus	Pre-Crisis	The Just'a Lotta Animals	This Earth (like Earth-C) is populated by anthropomorphic animals. Events and characters on this world parallel those of Earth-One/	Captain Carrot and His Amazing Zoo Crew! #14 (April 1983)
Earth-C-Plus	Pre-Crisis	Hoppy the Marvel Bunny	This Earth (like Earth-C and Earth-C Minus) is also populated by intelligent anthropomorphic talking animals, but those that were created by Fawcett Comics.	Fawcett's Funny Animals #1 (December 1942)
Earth-D	Post-Crisis retcon of Crisis on Infinite Earths itself	Justice Alliance of America	Earth-D featured a more ethnically diverse version of several Earth-One heroes, such as an Asian Flash, a Black Superman and an American Indian Green Arrow. The Earth-D heroes had never experienced major tragedies in their lives. It was a combination of modern multi-cultural sensibilities combined with Silver Age-style innocence.	Legends of the DC Universe: Crisis on Infinite Earths (February 1999)
Earth-G	Pre-Crisis	Travis Morgan, Inhabitants of Skartaris	An Earth populated by normal humans, but distinct in possessing an inner world populated by descendants of Atlantis called Skartaris; Designated a separate Earth in Answer Man column by Bob Rozakis, seen in Superman #341 (November 1979)	1st Issue Special #8 (Nov. 1975)
I-Earth	Pre-Crisis	Insect lifeforms	A "chronal world" created by Despero that was populated by insectoid lifeforms (aka Narx).; Designated canon in Crisis on Infinite Earths: Absolute Edition (November 2005)	Justice League of America #26 (March 1964)
Earth-I	Pre-Crisis	World of Immortals	Advances in science and medicine have resulted in an Earth of immortals.	Wonder Woman #293 (July 1982)
M-Earth	Pre-Crisis	Aquatic lifeforms	A "chronal world" created by Despero that was populated by aquatic lifeforms (aka Thanakon).	Justice League of America #26 (March 1964)
Earth-Prime	Pre-Crisis	Ultraa, Superboy-Prime, Julius Schwartz	The real world and the keystone Earth from which all the other Earths within the DC Multiverse originated. Earth-Prime had few superheroes. The superheroes of Earth-One, Earth-Two, Earth-Three, Earth-X, Earth-S, etc. existed only in fiction.	The Flash #179 (May 1968)
Earth-Q (All-Star Superman)	Infinite Crisis	Regular humans	An Earth created by Superman to see if a world without a Superman, nor any superheroes, could actually work.	JLA: Classified #1 (January 2005)
Earth-Q	Infinite Crisis	Unknown	One of three Earths named by Alexander Luthor Jr. in Infinite Crisis in his search for the perfect Earth.	Infinite Crisis #6 (May 2006)
Earth-Quality	Pre-Crisis	Characters from Quality Comics, as well as some characters done by Will Eisner	An Earth where stories published by Quality Comics occurred with the Allies winning World War II in 1945, unlike Earth-X.	The Comics Magazine #1 (1936)
R-Earth	Pre-Crisis	Reptilian lifeforms	A "chronal world" created by Despero and populated by reptilian lifeforms.	Justice League of America #26 (March 1964)
Earth-S	Pre-Crisis	Shazam, Captain Marvel, Captain Marvel Jr., Mary Marvel, Bulletman and Bulletgirl, Mr. Scarlet and Pinky the Whiz Kid, Minute-Man, Ibis the Invincible, Spy Smasher, Hunchback, Commando Yank, and Isis	Fawcett Comics publications of the 1940s and 1950s took place on this Earth, with its predominant heroic teams being the Marvel Family, the Crime Crusader Club and the Squadron of Justice, while the main team of supervillains was the Monster Society of Evil; Earth-S had a Counter-Earth, which was called Earth-S-Twin; Hypertime versions are Earth-5 and Earth 5	Whiz Comics #2 (February 1940)
Earth-Terra	Pre-Crisis	Superman, Lois Lane, Jor	An Earth where Superman and Lois Lane married and had a son named Jor.	Superman's Girlfriend, Lois Lane #94 (August 1969) and 96 (October 1969)
Earth-X (One) (Jimmy Olsen's Earth-X)	Pre-Crisis	Steelman, The LUTHAR League	An Earth visited by the Earth-One Jimmy Olsen. Perry White is a retired matador, Professor Potter is a cranky boss at the World's Fair and Clark Kent is a science fiction writer and secretly a Joker-masked villain that leads the LUTHAR League. Jimmy gains Superman-like powers and becomes Steelman, a superhero wearing a combination of Superman and Batman's costumes.	Superman's Pal Jimmy Olsen #93 (June 1966)
Earth-X (Two)	Pre-Crisis	The Freedom Fighters (revealed to have migrated from Earth-Two): Uncle Sam, the Human Bomb, Miss America, the Ray, the Black Condor, Doll Man, the Phantom Lady and Firebrand	On this Earth, Nazi Germany won World War II and the Freedom Fighters, originally from Earth-Two, fought to defeat it. Most Quality Comics publications chronicled adventures from this Earth.	Justice League of America #107 (October 1973)
Amalgam Universe (Earth-692) (Earth-9602) (Earth-496)	Post-Crisis	An Earth inhabited by (relatively) briefly merged versions of the DC Comics New Earth and Marvel Comics Earth-616 characters	An Earth formed out of a brief merging of the DC Comics New Earth and Marvel Comics Earth-616 universes.	Marvel Comics versus DC #3 (April 1996)
Crossover Earth (Earth-7642)	Pre-Crisis	All mainstream continuity DC Comics and Marvel Comics characters	An Earth where the Earth-One and the Marvel Universe of Earth-616 characters co-exist.	Superman vs. The Amazing Spider-Man (January 1976)
Dreamworld	Post-Crisis	The Love Syndicate of Dreamworld (Sunshine Superman, the Speed Freak, and Magic Lantern)	A world based on the drug culture that appeared briefly in Grant Morrison's Animal Man comic book series. Dreamworld is not an official designation, but is assumed from the name of this world's premier superhero team.	Animal Man #23 (May 1990)
(unnamed)	Infinite Crisis	Aztec versions of Superman, Batman, and Wonder Woman	This Earth was created by Alexander Luthor Jr. during Infinite Crisis, when he merged Earth-154 with Earth-462, which equals 616, the number used to identify the Marvel Universe	Infinite Crisis #6 (May 2006)
(unnamed)	Crisis on Infinite Earths	Pariah	The Earth that Pariah came from was never officially named. Fans often dubbed it "Earth-Omega" as it was the site of the "beginning of the end".	Crisis on Infinite Earths #7 (October 1985)
The Antimatter Universe	Pre-Crisis	The Anti-Monitor, the Weaponers of Qward, the Thunderers	Qward's universe has been described as a "universe of evil". Qwardian society seems to be dominated by a philosophy of selfishness and greed.; The Antimatter Universe held a special place in the Multiverse: there was an infinite number of "positive-matter universes" separated from each other by vibrational planes and there was a single Antimatter Universe.	Green Lantern (vol. 2) #2 (October 1960)
Magic-Land	Pre-Crisis	King Arthur, Merlin, Simon Magus, Zsa Zsa Saturna the "Lord of Misrule", Gagamboy, Lastikman, Volta and the "Troll King"	In this medieval Earth, magic works within its own laws of physics. It appears to be pre-industrial in terms of its technological base. Its continents are named "Olympus" (Asia), "Asgard" (North and South America) and "Oceania" (Australia). Camelot exists as a significant population center.; Transposed with Earth-One. The Justice League, Merlin and King Arthur resolved the situation and restored Earth-One and Magic-Land to their respective original universes	"The Secret of the Sinister Sorcerers", Justice League of America #2 (May 1962)
Unclassified
The Post-Crisis Earth	Post-Crisis	All residents of the reconstituted Earth formed following Crisis on Infinite Earths	This universe has various derivations, explained as manifestations of Hypertime and influenced by the actions of Superboy-Prime. This Earth blends elements of the last five universes existing prior to the Crisis.	Crisis on Infinite Earths #11 (February 1986)
The Antimatter Universe	Post-Crisis	The Crime Syndicate of America: Ultraman, Owlman, Superwoman, Power Ring, and Johnny Quick; the Justice Underground: Alexander Luthor, Solomon Grundy, General Grodd, Q-Ranger, Lady Sonar, Star Sapphire, and the Quizmaster	A Post-Crisis Antimatter Earth with a Crime Syndicate whose motto is "Cui bono?" ("Who profits?"), inspired by the Pre-Crisis Earth-Three. Originally, the Luthor of the CSA Earth, upon discovering the positive-matter Earth, named his world "Earth 1" and the positive-matter Earth "Earth 2" (no hyphens). Subsequent appearances revised the naming convention and simply referred to it as the Antimatter Universe's Earth, and also established that the CSA's Earth existed in the same Antimatter Universe as Qward.	original: JLA: Earth 2 (January 2000) revised: JLA #108 (January 2005)
DC Bombshells	Post-Flashpoint	Variants of female DC heroes and villains	Tie-in to the DC Comics Bombshells statue line; In 1940, various female DC heroes and villains are enlisted to fight in World War II.	DC Comics Bombshells #1 (October 2015)
Destiny's Hand	Post-Crisis	A variant Justice League International	An Earth formed out of the Atom's dreams by Doctor Destiny, where the JLI were militaristic fascists.	Justice League America #72 (March 1993)
Gotham City Garage	Post-Flashpoint	Variants of Prime Earth characters	An Earth where the entire continent, except for Gotham City (renamed "the Garden"), is a wasteland.	Gotham City Garage #1 (December 2017)
Super Friends	Pre-Crisis	Variants of Earth-One heroes and villains	The setting of the Super Friends franchise.	TV: Super Friends – "The Power Pirate" (September 1973) comics: Super Friends #1 (November 1976)
Fourth World	Pre- and Post-Crisis	Darkseid, Orion, Mister Miracle and Big Barda	The Fourth World is a continuum inhabited by the New Gods. Its two main worlds, New Genesis and Apokolips, are mirror reflections of each other: New Genesis, ruled by Highfather, and Apokolips, ruled by Darkseid.	Superman's Pal Jimmy Olsen #133 (October 1970)
Dakotaverse	Pre-Zero Hour	Icon, Rocket, Static, Hardware and the Blood Syndicate	The setting of the Milestone Comics universe ("Dakotaverse"). Following the events of Final Crisis, the Dakotaverse's characters were incorporated into the DC Comics universe.	Hardware #1 (April 1993)
Trinity	Post-Crisis	Justice Society International	A spell that was to replace Superman, Batman and Wonder Woman as the Trinity of New Earth was corrupted, resulting in a major alteration of New Earth's history. The Justice Society of America did not disband in the 1950s, but became Justice Society International and created a mistrust of the heroes who would form the Justice League. The reality tried to replace Superman, Batman and Wonder Woman, but continued efforts to become the Trinity by the spellcasters made the reality inherently unstable, with a rapidly changing history.	Trinity #18 (October 2008)

== The 52 Multiverse ==
A new Multiverse was revealed at the end of the 52 weekly maxiseries. Unlike the original Multiverse, which was composed of an infinite number of alternate universes, this Multiverse is composed of a predetermined number of alternate universes, which were originally referred to as New Earth and Earths 1 through 51, although erroneously in Tangent: Superman's Reign #1, New Earth is referred to as Earth-1; however, in Final Crisis: Superman Beyond #1, New Earth is instead designated Earth-0. Dan DiDio has since explicitly denied that New Earth is Earth-1. The alternate universes were originally identical to New Earth and contained the same history and people until Mister Mind "devoured" portions of each Earth's history. Each of the alternate universes have their own parallel dimensions, divergent timelines, microverses, etc., branching off of them.

The Guardians of the Universe serve as protectors of the new Multiverse. Each universe within the Multiverse is separated by a Source Wall, behind which the Anti-Life Equation keeps the universes apart. The Bleed permeates the Anti-Life Equation in unpredictable places behind the Source Wall, allowing for transport between universes. The destruction of New Earth would set off a chain reaction that would destroy the other 51 alternate universes at the same time, leaving only the Antimatter Universe in existence. As a consequence of Alexander Luthor Jr.'s attempts to recreate the Multiverse, 52 new Monitors were created to oversee the 52 universes created afterwards. The Monitors seek to protect the Multiverse from people who crossover from one alternate universe to another, through the Bleed or through innate ability, who the Monitors have labeled "anomalies".

Designation	Era	Notable Inhabitants	Notes	First appearance
New Earth (also known as Earth-0)	Infinite Crisis	Characters from DC Comics' main continuity	After the destruction of Alexander Luthor Jr.'s Multiverse Tower in Infinite Crisis, the parallel Earths that had been created were merged into a new single world dubbed "New Earth". New Earth remained the core reality of the DC Multiverse until the events of Flashpoint.; New Earth is a composite of the Pre-Crisis Earth-One, the Pre-Crisis Earth-Two, the Pre-Crisis Earth-Four, the Pre-Crisis Earth-X, the Pre-Crisis Earth-S and the Dakotaverse; Merged with Vertigo Earth and Earth-50 in the wake of the Flashpoint event and had its history rewritten as a result, creating The New 52 continuity.	Infinite Crisis #6 (May 2006)
Earth-1 (also known as Earth One)	Post-52	Modernized interpretations of the various DC Comics' characters	The setting of the Earth One series of graphic novels. Originally an Earth populated by blue-skinned humanoids who worshiped the now-deified Superman, Batman and Wonder Woman of New Earth; it was reshaped into an Earth reflective of the 21st century.	Trinity #28 (December 2008); Trinity #52 (May 2009)
Earth-2	Post-52	An alternate version of the Justice Society of America known as Justice Society Infinity	Resembles the Pre-Crisis Earth-Two.; This Earth's Justice Society of America has merged with its Infinity, Inc. and is now known as Justice Society Infinity	52 Week 52 (May 2007)
Earth-3	Post-52	Villains include the Crime Society of America. The Jokester and the Quizmaster are among the heroes.	An Earth of reversed moralities that resembles the Pre-Crisis Earth-Three and the Antimatter Earth.; This Earth contains evil counterparts of characters from Earth-2.	52 Week 52 (May 2007) (cameo), Countdown to Final Crisis #32 (September 2007) (full)
Earth-4	Post-52	Alternate versions of the Charlton Comics heroes, including Captain Allen Adam (an alternate version of Captain Atom), and alternate versions of the Blue Beetle, Sarge Steel, Nightshade, Peacemaker, the Question, the Tiger and Judomaster	Resembles the pre-Crisis Earth-Four; Described as a film noir Earth which uses story elements from the Watchmen limited series and is populated by alternate versions of characters acquired from Charlton Comics; Allen Adam (a.k.a. "Captain Allen Atom") the "Quantum Superman" appears in Final Crisis: Superman Beyond and is depicted as an amalgamation of Captain Atom and Doctor Manhattan.	52 Week 52 (May 2007)
Earth-5	Post-52	Alternate versions of characters acquired from Fawcett Comics, such as the Marvel Family, and an alternate Hal Jordan	Resembles the Pre-Crisis Earth-S. Unlike the Pre-Crisis Earth-S, alternate versions of DC Comics characters such as Green Lantern also exist on this Earth.	52 Week 52 (May 2007)
Earth-6	Post-52	An alternate version of the Atom (Ray Palmer), who after an accident developed light powers and called himself the Ray, and alternate versions of Rex Tyler and Ted Kord	This Earth is glimpsed in Final Crisis: Superman Beyond, where characters including versions of Etrigan the Demon and Offspring are seen	Countdown: Arena #2 (February 2008)
Earth-7	Post-52	An alternate version of Stargirl (Courtney Whitmore), known as Starwoman, and alternate older versions of Jakeem Thunder and the Wonder Twins		Countdown: Arena #2 (February 2008)
Earth-8	Post-52	Lord Havok and the Extremists, the Crusaders and the Meta Militia	A pastiche of the setting shown in Marvel Comics' publications. This version of Earth is called Angor by its inhabitants.; The Meta Militia are a group of heroes based upon the "Champions of Angor", who were a pastiche of the Marvel Comics superhero team the Avengers in Pre-Crisis continuity. Angor appears to be a U.S.-based republic and empire, ruled by a president and committed to global expansionism. It has already fought a war in Iran and presided over the nuclear devastation of Russia.	Countdown to Final Crisis #29 (October 2007)
Earth-9	Post-52	Characters shown in the "Tangent Comics" 1997 event	Resembles the pre-Crisis Earth-97; On this Earth, an African-American Superman with vast mental powers has conquered the entire planet and has outlawed all superpowered beings save for those who work under his command. This world's political relationships were affected by the escalation of the Cuban Missile Crisis into a nuclear conflict that devastated Florida and Cuba. The Soviet Union still exists as a superpower in the 1990s.	Countdown: Arena #2 (February 2008) (cameo), Tangent: Superman's Reign #1 (March 2008) (full)
Earth-10	Post-52	Alternate versions of characters from Quality Comics publications, such as the Freedom Fighters, and Nazi-themed versions of several DC characters	Resembles the pre-Crisis Earth-X; On this Earth, the Axis Powers won World War II. This Earth's Justice League reflect their Earth's values and consists of Nazis.	52 #52 (May 2007) (cameo), Countdown To Adventure #2 (November 2007) (full)
Earth-11	Post-52	Matriarchal world of reversed-gender superheroes such as Superwoman, Batwoman, and Wonder Man	This Earth has been shown at war as Wonder Man leads his male Amazons against the Justice League in retaliation for his expulsion from the League, following the killing of Maxine Lord; Maxine Lord killed this Earth's version of Booster Gold instead of Blue Beetle.	Countdown: Arena #1 (February 2008) and Countdown Presents: The Search for Ray Palmer – Superwoman/Batwoman #1 (February 2008)
Earth-12	Post-52	Characters and settings similar to ones shown in the television series Batman Beyond	The Green Lantern of Earth-12 is a descendant of Hal Jordan. In Countdown: Arena #1, it is explained that seven Green Lanterns patrol the "seven primary galaxies" and that Jordan's descendant patrols the Milky Way Galaxy.	Countdown to Final Crisis #21 (December 2007) and Countdown: Arena #1 (February 2008)
Earth-13	Post-52	Home to Brigadier Atom and Eve of Shadows. North America was destroyed by Monarch.	Keith Champagne claimed to have a vague recollection of Dan DiDio's list of alternate worlds and said that Earth-13 was "Vertigo, sort of".; It was stated by DiDio that the actual Vertigo universe was not part of the 52	Countdown: Arena #1 (February 2008)
Earth-15	Post-52	The Justice League	A near-Utopian Earth of highly evolved peaceful heroes, where crime has been virtually eliminated by efficient superheroes. Before being destroyed by Superboy-Prime, this Earth was home to a humanitarian Lex Luthor, a semi-retired Superman (an alternate version of General Zod) and a long-deceased Joker. Several heroes, such as Batman and Wonder Woman, had been succeeded by their protégées. Martian Manhunter and Cyborg were also Justice League members.	Countdown to Final Crisis #30 (October 2007)
Earth-16	Post-52	Characters shown in the television series, Young Justice (2010-2022), and Green Lantern: The Animated Series (2011-2013).	Earth-16 is the setting of the animated series Young Justice. Series creator Greg Weisman considers Catwoman: Hunted, DC Showcase: Green Arrow, and Green Lantern: The Animated Series to be canon-adjacent to Young Justice, meaning versions of these events all happened within the continuity of Young Justice.	Young Justice episode 1:"Independence Day" (January 7, 2011)
Earth-17	Post-52	Alternate versions of the Atomic Knights, Kamandi, Starman and an alternate version of Etrigan the Demon known as Superdemon	After a nuclear World War III was fought in its alternate 1987, this Earth became a post-apocalyptic wasteland; Resembles the Earth of the Pre-Crisis Atomic Knights stories; Simians make up much of this Earth's population. As such, an ape is this Earth's Starman.; This Earth's Etrigan is a demon from the planet Kamelot who was sent to Earth by the wizard Merlin. Etrigan bonded with Jason Blood, the son of a Midwestern preacher, who uses the demon's powers and physical form to fight crime.; Magic and science co-exist in this universe.	52 Week 52 (May 2007)
Earth-18	Post-52	Characters shown in the Justice Riders one-shot	This Earth's Justice League is composed of marshals operating in the Wild West.	Countdown: Arena #1 (February 2008)
Earth-19	Post-52	Characters shown in the graphic novel Gotham by Gaslight	In Countdown to Final Crisis #40, a Monitor identifies his Earth as being "in the throes of the Industrial Revolution."; This Earth's Blue Beetle (Dan Garrett) and Man-Bat (Robert Langstrom) were shown in Countdown Presents: The Search for Ray Palmer – Gotham by Gaslight #1.	Countdown Presents: The Search for Ray Palmer – Gotham by Gaslight #1 (January 2008)
Earth-20	Post-52	'Pulp' versions of various DC characters	This Earth is home to the Society of Super-Heroes, a group of 'pulp'-style mystery men led by Doc Fate (an alternate version of Doctor Fate), which includes alternate versions of Lady Blackhawk, Immortal Man, the Mighty Atom, the Green Lantern and the Bat-Man.	Final Crisis: Superman Beyond #1 (August 2008) (cameo)
Earth-21	Post-52	Characters shown in the DC: The New Frontier miniseries		DC: The New Frontier #1 (March 2004)
Earth-22	Post-52	Characters shown in the Kingdom Come miniseries	This Earth's Superman traveled to Earth-0 and joined the Justice Society of America. He later returned to Earth-22 and settled down with his Earth's Wonder Woman, raising a superpowered family and living into the 31st century, the era of the Legion of Super-Heroes.	52 Week 52 (May 2007) (cameo)
Earth-23	Final Crisis	Black versions of several DC characters	This Earth is home to black versions of DC characters; including Superman (who is President of the United States) and Wonder Woman, and a version of Brainiac called Brainiac: Vathlo Prime.; The Wonder Woman of this Earth is named Nubia, hailing from the island of Amazonia, where its inhabitants, the Wonder Women, have brought anti-war technology to the world.; The Superman of this Earth is from Vathlo Island on Krypton and wears a reversed version of the normal Superman shield, with a yellow S on a red shield. The Wonder Woman of this Earth is an alternate version of Nubia, a supporting character from the Wonder Woman comic book.	Final Crisis #7 (March 2009)
Earth-26	Post-52	Intelligent anthropomorphic talking animals, protected by the superhero group the Zoo Crew, and the Scarab, a being made up of millions of carnivorous blue beetles	Featured in the Captain Carrot and the Final Ark miniseries, Earth-26 is rendered uninhabitable and the Zoo Crew (along with many of this Earth's inhabitants) are stranded on Earth-0 by means of a New Dogs' kaboom tube, where they take the appearance of normal animals and are unable to communicate with the humans of Earth-0. The renegade Monitor Nix Uotan later manages to restore their original forms, speech and powers.	Captain Carrot and the Final Ark #1 (December 2007)
Earth-30	Post-52	Characters shown in the Superman: Red Son miniseries	In Countdown to Final Crisis #40, a Monitor identifies his Earth as one where "the last Kryptonian became a representative of the Soviet empire." Superman's craft landed in the Soviet Union's Ukraine and he succeeded Josef Stalin as Soviet Premier upon the latter's death in 1953. Under his influence, the Soviet Union almost won the Cold War on this Earth.; Also called Earth-1598*	Countdown to Final Crisis #32 (September 2007); Countdown Presents: The Search for Ray Palmer – Red Son #1 (February 2008)
Earth-31	Post-52	Characters shown in Frank Miller's The Dark Knight Returns and its various spin-off titles	This Earth's Batman is a dark vigilante who fights against crime and corruption, while Superman is a federal agent for the government.	Countdown: Arena #1 (February 2008)
Earth-32	Post-52	Characters shown in the Batman: In Darkest Knight one-shot	Bruce Wayne becomes this Earth's Green Lantern instead of Hal Jordan.	Countdown: Arena #1 (February 2008)
Earth-33	Post-52	Magical versions of several DC characters	A magical version of the DC Universe, which is home to characters such as "Batmage, master of the Dark Arts, Kal-El, wielder of Kryptonian magics, and Lady Flash, keeper of the Speed Force", as well as Black Bird (an alternate version of Hawkgirl), an alternate version of Starman, heroic versions of the Weather Wizard and the Shade, and an anthropomorphic blue beetle called Ted; This Earth's ruler is the mystical Oracle, who can perceive and foresee events from across the Multiverse	Countdown to Adventure #3 (February 2008)
Earth-34	Post-52	Characters shown in the Wonder Woman: Amazonia graphic novel	An Earth in which the British Empire is under the reign of the sadistic and misogynist King Jack after he murdered Queen Victoria and most of the rest of the Victorian era British royal family.	Countdown to Adventure #1 (October 2007)
Earth-37	Post-52	Characters shown in the Batman: Thrillkiller trade paperback	Also home to an alternate version of the original Firestorm (Ronnie Raymond) who has merged with this Earth's Captain Atom to become Quantum-Storm.	Countdown: Arena #1 (February 2008)
Earth-38	Post-52	Unknown	Home to an alternate version of Captain Atom, who is the leader of the Atomic Knights.	Countdown: Arena #2 (February 2008)
Earth-39	Post-52	Unknown	Home to a teenage version of the original Blue Beetle, Daniel Garrett, who has bonded with his scarab in the same manner that Jaime Reyes has bonded with his scarab.	Countdown: Arena #2 (February 2008)
Earth-40	Post-52	Characters shown in the JSA: The Liberty Files trade paperback	An Earth in which superheroes are depicted as covert government operatives.; The Batman of this Earth is known as "the Bat".	Countdown: Arena #1 (February 2008)
Earth-43	Post-52	Characters shown in the Tales of the Multiverse: Batman – Vampire trade paperback	An Earth in which this Earth's Batman has become a vampire.; In Countdown to Final Crisis #40, Monitor Rox Ogama identifies his Earth as being "a world of vampires and the supernatural".	Countdown to Final Crisis #40 (July 2007) (cameo), Countdown Presents: The Search for Ray Palmer – Red Rain #1 (January 2008) (full)
Earth-44	Final Crisis	Alternate version of the Metal Men who are composed of robotic versions of the Justice League and their leader "Doc" Will Tornado	This Earth is mentioned in Final Crisis #7, with a shard of Earth-44 colliding with Earth-0 and being used by the heroes as a last-ditch base of operations.; The Metal Men of this Earth are robotic versions of the Justice League, consisting of robotic counterparts of Superman, the Batman, Wonder Woman, Hawkman, the Flash and the Green Arrow. Their leader, "Doc" Will Tornado, is human and apparently an amalgamation of the Red Tornado and Will Magnus.	Final Crisis #7 (March 2009) (cameo)
Earth-48	Post-52	The Forerunners	The home universe of the Forerunners, creatures created by the Monitors after the destruction of all human life on Earth in a war against the rest of the solar system.; While humanity is extinct in this universe, alternate versions of extraterrestrial characters such as General J'onzz, Jemm, and Starman also exist.	Countdown to Final Crisis #46 (June 2007)
Earth-50	Post-52	The Wildstorm Universe, featuring characters such as Mister Majestic, Gen^{13}, the WildC.A.T.s and the Authority.	Numbered in 52 #52 (May 2007), this Earth supposedly correlated with the Wildstorm Comics titles following their internal continuity reboot entitled "Worldstorm"; Merged with Earth-0 in the wake of the Flashpoint event	WildC.A.T.S. (vol. 4) #1 (September 2006)
Earth-51	Post-52	Utopian society where many deceased characters are still alive	A Utopian Earth where secret identities are no longer needed by superheroes. Libby Lawrence-Chambers is President of the United States, Zatanna is a therapist and Ray Palmer was replaced by his counterpart from Earth-0. This Earth owes its peace to a Batman who went on a one-man crusade and eliminated all of the world's supervillains in retaliation for the Joker's murder of Jason Todd.; This entire universe was wiped out by a battle between the Monarch and Superboy-Prime, save for its Monitor, Nix Uotan, and a lone plant on an unknown planet.	Countdown to Final Crisis #19 (December 2007)
Earth-51	Post-52	The setting of Kamandi, the Last Boy on Earth	Nix Uotan successfully recreated his universe, at first making it resemble Earth-0, except that certain people, including the Challengers from Beyond, had never existed there. Solomon, the Monitor of Earth-8, conspired for it to be infected by the Morticoccus virus, triggering the Great Disaster which transformed this Earth into the setting of Kamandi, the Last Boy on Earth.	
(unknown)	Post-52	Characters shown in the JLA: The Nail miniseries	Countdown: Arena #1 features counterparts of Aquaman, Martian Manhunter, Hawkgirl and the Atom, who are all referred to as coming from the Earth seen in the JLA: The Nail miniseries.	Countdown: Arena #1 (February 2008)
(unknown)	Post-52	"Super deformed" versions of DC characters	This universe is a bright, optimistic place where no one ever dies (including the inhabitants of Krypton and Thomas and Martha Wayne). Mr. Mxyzptlk and Bat-Mite brought characters from this universe to Earth-0 to see how they fared. This led to the death of this Earth's Superman.	Superman/Batman #51 (October 2008)
(unknown)	Post-52	Doc Savage, Batman, the Spirit, Rima the Jungle Girl and other pulp characters	An Earth of pulp characters, both derived from classic DC characters and also drawing on classic literary pulp characters. It is said that this Earth lacks a Superman, so as not to devalue Doc Savage.	Batman/Doc Savage Special #1 (January 2010)
Earth-Prime	Post-52	Superboy-Prime and the 2004 incarnation of the Legion of Super-Heroes	Similar to the real world, superheroes exist only in fiction, outside of Superboy-Prime and the 2004 incarnation of the Legion of Super-Heroes.	Final Crisis: Legion of 3 Worlds #5 (July 2009)
The Antimatter Universe	Post-Zero Hour	The Anti-Monitor, the Crime Syndicate of Amerika, the Sinestro Corps, the Warlock of Ys, and the Weaponers of Qward	The Antimatter Universe is a "universe of evil". It survived the events of Crisis on Infinite Earths and Infinite Crisis and exists alongside the 52 positive-matter alternate universes.	Green Lantern (vol. 2) #2 (October 1960)
Limbo	Post-Crisis	"Forgotten" characters such as Merryman of the Inferior Five and Hard Hat of the Demolition Team	Exists outside of the Multiverse.; The first DC Universe appearance of "Limbo" was in Grant Morrison's Animal Man series, in which Morrison takes the concept of "comic book limbo" (where forgotten characters go when they are not being published) and makes it literal.	Animal Man #25 (July 1990)

=== The New 52 Multiverse ===
The Flashpoint story arc ended with a massive change to the Multiverse; to what extent it is entirely new, and to what extent it is as it was formed in the wake of 52, has not fully been established. Some worlds, like Earth-1 and Earth-23, appear to be entirely untouched, while others, like Earth-0, Earth-2, and Earth-16, have changed drastically. A number of worlds from the previous Multiverse were also reassigned; for example, Earth-31, originally the alternate Earth where Frank Miller's The Dark Knight Returns and All-Star Batman and Robin, the Boy Wonder is set, is now occupied by post-apocalyptic waterworld analogues of Batman and other DC staples.

== The Divine Continuum ==
In July 2014, a map of the Multiverse was released, in promotion of The Multiversity series. In 2016, DC Rebirth begins restoring the DC Universe to a form much like that prior to The New 52 while still incorporating numerous elements of its continuity. The end of the Convergence series resulted in the retroactive saving of the Pre-Crisis DC Multiverse. In an interview Jeff King stated, "The battle to save not one, but two multiverses in Convergence provides it", and later states "In many ways, the number of Worlds is now infinite. There may even be more than one Multiverse", as well as "Post-Convergence, every character that ever existed, in either Continuity or Canon, is now available to us as storytellers".

In Doomsday Clock (2019) it was revealed that previous incarnations of DC Universe, such as Pre-Crisis Earth-One and New 52's Prime Earth still exist as part of the "metaverse" as Earth 1985 and Earth 52, as a way of preserving every era of Superman. Flashpoint Beyond then clarified that the Omniverse and Hypertime exist alongside each other in a larger Divine Continuum, with worlds born of evolution of the timeline existing in Hypertime while worlds based on different conceptual frameworks exist in the Omniverse.

=== The Omniverse ===
Originally, there were 52 Earths in the local Multiverse home to the DCU Prime Earth. But in Dark Nights: Death Metal, this was confirmed that there are an infinite number of universes existing beyond them. This new model of creation involves multiple incarnations of the Multiverse suspended within a larger Omniverse, with individual Multiverses existing as 'bubble' sets of grouped universes, such as the local 52 or the now-defunct Multiverse 2, which has been identified as the remains of the pre-Crisis Multiverse. In Dark Crisis (2022), Pariah engineers a revival of many Earths from the original Multiverse, and adds them to the current Multiverse, removing the 52-world cap.

==== The Local Multiverse ====
Designation	Era defined	Notable Inhabitants	Notes	First appearance
The Orrery of Worlds
Earth-Alpha	Infinite Frontier	Darker versions of characters from DC Comics' main continuity.	One of two new "centers" of the Multiverse after the Infinite Frontier was opened up. It was referred to as "the Alpha World" and "the Elseworld", and has a chaotic vibrational frequency.; Main setting of the Absolute Universe after Darkseid infected it.	Dark Nights: Death Metal #7 (March 2021)
Earth 0 (also known as Prime Earth and New Earth)	Multiversity	Characters from DC Comics' main continuity.	Shares a similar history with the previous amalgamated Earths.; This Earth was created by merging Earth-0, the Vertigo Universe hypertimeline, and the Wildstorm Universe hypertimeline from the previous Multiverse in the wake of the Flashpoint event.	Flashpoint #5 (August 2011)
Earth 1	Multiversity	A superhero community just starting out on a contemporary Earth.	The setting of the Earth One graphic novel series.	original form: Trinity #28 (December 2008) cameo appearance: Trinity #52 (May 2009) first story: Superman: Earth One (December 2010)
Earth 2	Multiversity	Younger versions of DC's Pre-Crisis Golden Age characters.	This Earth mainly features modernized versions of DC's heroes from the Golden Age of Comics and characters associated with later Justice Society and Infinity Inc. comics.	Earth-2 #1 (July 2012)
Earth 3	Multiversity	Home of true evil and the Crime Syndicate: Ultraman, Owlman, Superwoman, Power Ring, Johnny Quick, the Sea King, Deathstorm, Atomica, the Outsider, and a version of the Martian Manhunter.	This Earth includes evil counterparts to members of the Justice League and Prime Earth inhabitants. They include: Destroyed by the Anti-Monitor but then reborn after DC Rebirth.	Justice League #23 (October 2013) (mentioned); Justice League #23.4 (November 2013)
Earth 4	Multiversity	Versions of the Charlton Comics line of DC characters presented in the style of the graphic novel Watchmen.	This world resembles the pre-Crisis Earth-Four and 52's Earth-4. It also draws from Watchmen, the Alan Moore graphic novel depicting gritty analogues of the Charlton heroes.	The Multiversity: Pax Americana #1 (Nov. 2014)
Earth 5	Multiversity	Versions of the Fawcett Comics line of DC characters. Also known as "Thunderworld".	This Earth resembles the pre-Crisis Earth-S and 52's Earth-5.	The Multiversity: Thunderworld #1 (December 2014)
Earth 6	Multiversity	Alternate versions of Superman, Green Lantern, the Flash, and others.	Marvel Comics editor Stan Lee's Just Imagine... Earth.	The Multiversity Guidebook #1 (January 2015)
Earth 7	Multiversity	Pastiches of characters featured in Marvel Comics' Ultimate Marvel line of superhero stories.	This Earth was somewhat similar to Earth-8, but has been destroyed by the Gentry in what is called "The Essential Genocide Crossover", at least on Earth-16.; A pastiche of Marvel Comics' Ultimate Universe setting and imprint, here called the "Essential Universe".; A hero named the Thunderer, based on Thor, is the last survivor of this Earth.	The Multiversity #1 (August 2014)
Earth 8	Multiversity	Pastiches of characters featured in rival publisher Marvel Comics' mainstream line of superhero stories.	A pastiche of the main setting (Earth-616) shown in Marvel Comics' publications. These stories are known in comic books put out by "Major Comics" on the other Earths of the Multiverse.; This version of Earth is called "Angor" by its inhabitants.; The Retaliators are the main superhero team, opposing Lord Havok and the Extremists.	The Multiversity #1 (August 2014)
Earth 9	Multiversity	Characters depicted in the Tangent Comics line.	The "Tangent Comics" Earth.	The Multiversity Guidebook #1 (January 2015)
Earth 10	Multiversity	The New Reichsmen and the Freedom Fighters.	This Earth resembles the Pre-Crisis Earth-X.; On this Earth, Kal-L's rocket landed in Germany, where he was raised by Adolf Hitler, and helped Germany win World War II. He grew up to become Overman, leader of the New Reichsmen, alongside Leatherwing, Brünhilde, Underwaterman and Blitzen. They are opposed by the Freedom Fighters, led by Uncle Sam.	The Multiversity: Mastermen #1 (February 2015)
Earth 11	Multiversity	Reversed-gender versions of DC Comics characters, including Superwoman, Batwoman, Wondrous Man and Aquawoman. More recently, it has also been shown to have a gender reversed "Teen Titans" analogue, Teen Justice, which consists of Robin (Talia Kane), Supergirl, Kid Quick, Raven, Aquagirl, Klarienne the Witch Girl and Donald Troy, their offspring or sidekicks.	An Earth of reversed-gender characters.; Explained in The Multiversity to have an altered history as well; the Amazons of Themiscyra imposed their law and shared their technology with the world, inspiring women to take a lead in its history. Jesse Quick and Star Sapphire feature on the Justice Guild in place of the Flash and Green Lantern, respectively.	The Multiversity #1 (August 2014) (mentioned)
Earth 12	Multiversity	The Justice League Beyond.	The universe depicted in the various Batman Beyond comics (i.e., the DCAU), though it is not the same world depicted in the post-Futures End Beyond titles. Those revolved around a possible future timeline of the mainstream Earth and are part of Hypertime.	Batman Beyond #1 (February 2012)
Earth 13	Multiversity	The League of Shadows.	A magic-based Earth, where an occult version of the Justice League is led by Superdemon, a combination of Superman and Etrigan the Demon.	The Multiversity Guidebook #1 (January 2015)
Earth 14	post-Multiversity	The Justice League of Assassins.	Originally revealed in The Multiversity as one of seven Earths deliberately left as unknown.; A post-apocalyptic dystopian Earth.	Superman (vol. 4) #15 (January 2017)
Earth 15	Multiversity		A "perfect" universe that was destroyed by Superboy-Prime in Countdown to Final Crisis. The only remnant of this universe is a powerful object known as the Cosmic Grail.	Countdown to Final Crisis #30 (October 2007)
Earth 16	Multiversity	The Just, a team of celebrity youngsters.	Also known as "Earth-Me".; Originally envisioned as Earth-11. as well as Earth-22 through various incarnations of the Multiverse; An Earth where, since the Justice League did such a good job of fighting crime, their children and sidekicks have nothing really to do. Residents include Chris Kent, Conner Kent, Damian Wayne, Offspring, Arrowette, and Donna Troy.	The Multiversity: The Just #1 (October 2014)
Earth 17	Multiversity	Captain Adam Strange and the Atomic Knights of Justice.	This Earth suffered a nuclear war in 1963.; The Atomic Knights struggle to rebuild the ruined Earth of 21st century Novamerika.	The Multiversity Guidebook #1 (January 2015)
Earth 18	Multiversity	The Justice Riders, consisting of several of DC's western characters, including Super-Chief, Bat-Lash and El Diablo	The Time Trapper froze technology and culture in the late 19th century of the Old West. Modern conveniences, such as air travel and the Internet, had to be created with 19th century resources.	The Multiversity Guidebook #1 (January 2015)
Earth 19	Multiversity	Steampunk heroes based on the setting of Gotham by Gaslight.	The Bat Man, Wonder Woman, the Accelerated Man and the Shrinking Man live here. This Earth and its universe were destroyed by Perpetua and then was seemingly brought back after Death Metal.	The Multiversity Guidebook #1 (January 2015)
Earth 20	Multiversity	The Society of Super-Heroes, pulp versions of DC heroes.	The S.O.S. includes Doc Fate, Immortal Man, Lady Blackhawk, Green Lantern Abin Sur, and the Atom (Al Pratt).; This Earth is in a 1930s/1940s style, while taking place in 2014.; This Earth is a "binary universe" with Earth-40, and has been at war with them for five years.	The Multiversity: The Society of Super-Heroes – Conquerors of the Counter-World #1 (September 2014)
Earth 21	Multiversity		The Earth depicted in DC: The New Frontier.	The Multiversity Guidebook #1 (January 2015)
Earth 22	Multiversity		The Earth depicted in Kingdom Come.	The Multiversity Guidebook #1 (January 2015)
Earth 23	Multiversity	Home to a black Superman, with the black superheroes of this Earth being more prominent than the white superheroes.	This Earth resembles the one seen in Final Crisis #7.; On this Earth, Superman is a black man named Kalel, originally from Krypton's Vathlo Island. In his secret identity of Calvin Ellis, he serves as President of the United States, and has inspired a generation of black superheroes to rise to prominence.; This Earth's Wonder Woman is a black woman named Nubia. Superman leads a predominately African American Justice League.; According to Grant Morrison, this Earth's Superman is based on Barack Obama and its Wonder Woman is based on Beyoncé Knowles.	Action Comics (vol. 2) #9 (July 2012)
Earth 24	Dark Crisis	Aquawoman, Batwoman, the Question, Stargirl, Supergirl, Wonder Woman, Zatanna.	The Earth depicted in DC Comics Bombshells.; Predominantly female heroes fight World War II.	DC Comics Bombshells #1 (October 2015)
Earth 25	post-Multiversity	Tom Strong	This Earth contains characters from Alan Moore's America's Best Comics imprint.; Homeworld of Tom Strong.	The Terrifics #7 (August 2018)
Earth 26	Multiversity	Intelligent, anthropomorphic, talking animals, protected by the superhero group the Zoo Crew.	This Earth was temporarily destroyed by Starro, but its inherent "cartoon physics" allowed it to survive and bounce back.	The Multiversity #1 (August 2014) (Captain Carrot appears)
Earth 27	Dark Crisis	Dinosaur versions of DC Comics characters.	The Earth depicted in The Jurassic League.	The Jurassic League #1 (May 2022)
Earth 28	Dark Crisis	Versions of DC Comics characters who pilot giant mecha.	The Earth depicted in DC: Mech.	DC: Mech #1 (September 2022)
Earth 29	Multiversity	Bizarro versions of DC Comics characters	Also known as the Bizarroverse	The Multiversity Guidebook #1 (January 2015)
Earth 30	Multiversity		The universe depicted in Superman: Red Son; Features a Soviet symbol	The Multiversity Guidebook #1 (January 2015)
Earth 31	Multiversity	Pirate versions of DC Comics characters	On this Earth, Leatherwing (Batman) and Robin Redblade (Robin) are pirates on the seven seas in a post-apocalyptic waterworld	The Multiversity Guidebook #1 (January 2015)
Earth 32	Multiversity	Merged versions of DC Comics characters	Every superhero of this Earth is an amalgamation of two characters from the regular DC Universe. As in Batman: In Darkest Knight, Batman is Green Lantern, but there is also a Black Arrow, Wonderhawk, Aquaflash, and other DC amalgamated heroes.	The Multiversity Guidebook #1 (January 2015)
Earth 33 (also known as Earth-Prime)	Multiversity	Us, the Neighborhood Guard, and Ultra Comics	Our own Earth, where superheroes exist only in fiction. Thus, its sole superhero only exists in the form of a comic book.; This Earth resembles the Pre-Crisis/52 Earth-Prime	The Multiversity: Ultra Comics #1 (March 2015)
Earth 34	Multiversity	Savior, Ghostman and other analogues of Kurt Busiek's DC Comics analogues	Grant Morrison defines Earth 34 and Earth 35, and possibly other neighboring Earths, as homes to "copies of copies", home to analogues to Justice League analogues produced by writers Kurt Busiek and Rob Liefeld for rival publishing houses. Earth 34 is the Busiek pastiche universe.; Homeworld of the Light Brigade	The Multiversity Guidebook #1 (January 2015)
Earth 35	Multiversity	Supremo, Majesty, and analogues of Rob Liefeld's Justice League analogues	Grant Morrison defines Earth 34 and Earth 35, and possibly other neighboring Earths, as homes to "copies of copies", home to analogues to Justice League analogues produced by writers Kurt Busiek and Rob Liefeld for rival publishing houses. Earth 35 is the Liefeld pastiche universe.; Homeworld of the Super-Americans.	The Multiversity Guidebook #1 (January 2015)
Earth 36	Multiversity	Home to the Red Racer, Optiman, the Iron Knight, and Flashlight of the Justice 9	This Earth is a pastiche of Big Bang Comics, which itself featured homages of the Golden Age and Silver Age superheroes from DC Comics.	Action Comics (vol. 2) #9 (July 2012) (characters named)
Earth 37	Multiversity	Ironwolf, Tommy Tomorrow, the Space Rangers, Manhunter 2015, Batgirl, Robin, and the Joker	This Earth is based on the works of Howard Chaykin, including Batman: Thrillkiller, Twilight and Weird Worlds.; Described as a grim, lawless Earth of rapid technological advancement in the '60s, '70s and '80s.	The Multiversity Guidebook #1 (January 2015)
Earth 38	Multiversity		A real-time Earth where Batman and Superman debuted in the 1930s, as in Superman & Batman: Generations. Their descendants are today's heroes.	The Multiversity Guidebook #1 (January 2015)
Earth 39	Multiversity	The Agents of W.O.N.D.E.R.	A pastiche of the T.H.U.N.D.E.R. Agents	The Multiversity Guidebook #1 (January 2015)
Earth 40	Multiversity	The Society of Super Villains	This Earth is a "binary universe" to Earth-20, containing evil counterparts of those characters, including Vandal Savage, Lady Shiva, Blockbuster, Felix Faust, and Count Sinestro.; This Earth went to war against Earth-20 five years ago.	The Multiversity: The Society of Super-Heroes – Conquerors of the Counter-World #1 (September 2014)
Earth 41	Multiversity	Home to Spore, the Dino-Cop, the Nimrod Squad, Nightcracker, the Scorpion, Sepulchre	Characters on this Earth are based on characters published by Image Comics, such as Spawn and the Savage Dragon	The Multiversity #1 (August 2014) (Dino-Cop appears)
Earth 42	Multiversity	The Lil' Leaguers	This Earth contains chibi versions of DC Comics characters.; This world had no evil, death, or violence until Earth-45's Superdoomsday killed their Superman; Dick Grayson is this Earth's Batman	Action Comics (vol. 2) #9 (July 2012)
Earth 43	Multiversity	The Blood League, vampire versions of the Justice League	Inspired by Batman & Dracula: Red Rain, but where the entire Justice League and villains like Doctor Sivana have succumbed to, and embraced, the vampire curse.; This universe's Mr. Terrific is dead.	The Multiversity Guidebook #1 (January 2015)
Earth 44	Multiversity	The Metal League, robotic versions of the Justice League	"Doc" Will Tornado invented a metal Justice League to be heroes for his Earth, such as Platinum Wonder Woman, Gold Superman, Lead Green Arrow, etc.; This universe's Mr. Terrific is dead.	The Multiversity Guidebook #1 (January 2015)
Earth 45	Multiversity	Superdoomsday and the corporation Overcorp	On this Earth, Clark Kent, Lois Lane, and Jimmy Olsen tried to create their own superhero using thought-powered technology. The business executives of Overcorp corrupted their creation, turning it into the monstrous Superdoomsday, which went on a rampage through the Multiverse.	Action Comics (vol. 2) #9 (July 2012)
Earth 46	Dark Crisis	A grim young Batman with a unique, unrecognizable rogue's gallery	The Earth depicted in Batman: Gargoyle of Gotham.	Batman: Gargoyle of Gotham #1 (September 2023)
Earth 47	Multiversity	The Love Syndicate of Dreamworld, including Prez Rickard, Sunshine Superman, Brother Power the Geek and other counterculture-inspired heroes.	This Earth is home to characters that first appeared in Animal Man #23 (May 1990), including Sunshine Superman, the Speed Freak, Magic Lantern, and the Love Syndicate of Dreamworld.	The Multiversity Guidebook #1 (January 2015)
Earth 48	Multiversity	Also known as Warworld. Home to genetically engineered warriors bred to wage war against Lord Darkseid.	Home to the Forerunners, Lady Quark, the Brother Eyes and other members of the Royal Family.	The Multiversity Guidebook #1 (January 2015)
Earth 49	Dark Crisis	The New Regime led by a brutal, dictatorial version of Superman, and the Insurgency, led by Batman.	The Earth depicted in Injustice: Gods Among Us.; Lois Lane dies, leading Superman to become an authoritarian dictator.; Initially one of seven Earths deliberately left as unknown in The Multiversity, being the "most mysterious" with a burning reality.	Injustice: Gods Among Us #1 (March 2013)
Earth 50	Multiversity	The Justice Lords, consisting of alternate versions of Superman, Batman, Wonder Woman, Martian Manhunter, Hawkgirl, and Green Lantern. This world's version of Terry McGinnis later becomes their own Batman Beyond.	Based on the Justice Lords' universe depicted in the Justice League animated series.; On this Earth, United States President Lex Luthor killed the Flash, leading to his murder by Superman and inspiring a cruel dystopian regime enforced by the Lords. The Batman Beyond of Earth 12 later comes to help redeem this world.	Justice League Beyond 2.0 #17 (April 2014)
Earth 51	Multiversity	An Earth of Jack Kirby's creations, including Kamandi the Last Boy on Earth, BiOMAC, and the New Gods		The Multiversity Guidebook #1 (January 2015)
Earth 52	post-Multiversity	An Earth of sapient metasimians known as the Primate Legion, consisting of Titano (Superape), Mister Stubbs (Batape), the Sea Ape and a lemur Atomarsupial, also time-travelers	Previously designated as Earth-53	Dark Knights Rising: Wild Hunt #1 (February 2018)
Earth 53	Dark Crisis		A universe near-identical to Earth 52, except the primates of this Earth have all gone extinct.	Dark Crisis: The Dark Army #1 (February 2023)
Earth 54	Dark Crisis	Tommy Tomorrow	Humankind lands on Mars in 1960.	Real Fact Comics #6
Earth 55	Dark Crisis	Zombie versions of DC Comics characters	The Earth depicted in DCeased.	DCeased #1 (May 2019)
Earth 59	Dark Crisis	An alternate version of Wonder Woman named Tara Terruna.	The first known parallel Earth	Wonder Woman v1 #59 (May 1953)
Earth 63	Dark Crisis	Vampire versions of DC Comics characters	The Earth depicted in DC vs. Vampires.	DC vs. Vampires #1 (October 2021)
Earth 66	Dark Crisis	Batman, Robin, Batgirl	The setting of Batman (1966), Adventures of Superman, and Legends of the Superheroes.	Batman '66 #1 (July 2013)
Earth 93	Dark Crisis	Static, Icon, Hardware	The Dakotaverse.; Contains updated versions of characters and storylines present in Milestone Comics.; Initially designated as Earth-M.	Milestone Returns #0 (November 2020)
Earth 96	Dark Crisis	Teenaged versions of DC Comics characters in high school	The Earth depicted in DC Super Hero Girls.	"#TheLateBatsby" (DC Super Hero Girls)
Earth 98	Dark Crisis	Green Lantern Tai Pham	The Earth depicted in Green Lantern: Legacy.	Green Lantern: Legacy #1 (March 2020)
Earth 100	Dark Crisis	Raven Roth, Garfield Logan, Damian Wayne	Home of the Teen Titans.	Teen Titans: Raven #1 (July 2019)
Earth 118	Dark Crisis	Medieval versions of DC Comics characters	The Earth depicted in Dark Knights of Steel.	Dark Knights of Steel #1 (November 2021)
Earth 124	Dark Crisis	Wonder Queen, Wonder Woman, Wonder Girl, Wonder Tot	Home of the Wonder Family.	Wonder Woman v1 #124 (August 1961)
Earth 148	Dark Crisis		Earth 0 counterpart heroes are villains, and vice versa.	World's Finest #148 (March 1965)
Earth 162	Dark Crisis	Superman Red, Superman Blue, Batman Blue, Batman Gray	Superman and, later, Batman are divided into two separate beings.	Superman v1 #162 (July 1963)
Earth 183	Dark Crisis	Karkan	Superman was raised by apes.	Superboy #183 (March 1972)
Earth 216	Dark Crisis	Superman Jr. and Batman Jr.	Home of the Super Sons.	World's Finest Comics #215 (December 2022)
Earth 247	Post-Dark Crisis		Home of the post-Zero Hour Legion of Super-Heroes.	Legion of Superheroes #0 (October 1994)
Earth 387	Dark Crisis	Werewolf versions of DC Comics characters	No divergence in history other than every inhabitant is a werewolf.	Adventure Comics #387 (December 1969)
Earth 420	Infinite Frontier		An Earth visited by Bloodsport during his journey across the multiverse.	Suicide Squad #7 (November 2021)
Earth 424	Infinite Frontier		An Earth where Amanda Waller's forces retrieved an old Kryptonian Ship that the Suicide Squad has used to journey to Oa	Suicide Squad #9 (January 2022)
Earth 789	Dark Crisis	Superman, Supergirl, Batman	An Earth where the Superman and Batman films take place in the same universe.; Superman and Supergirl are Earth's only powered heroes; Batman's parents were killed by the Joker.	Dark Crisis: Big Bang #1 (February 2023)
Earth 898	Dark Crisis		A Justice League without Superman.	JLA: the Nail #1 (August 1998)
Earth 1956	Dark Crisis	Superman, Batman, Wonder Woman, Aquaman	A teenage Superman (Superboy) and his dog (Krypto) are Earth's first superheroes; later, home to the Superfriends	Super Friends #1 (November 1976)
Earth 1993	Post-Dark Crisis	Static, Icon, Hardware	The original Dakotaverse.; Contains the original versions of characters and storylines present in Milestone Comics.	Hardware #1 (February 1993)
Earth 1996	Dark Crisis	Super Soldier, Dark Claw and other "amalgamated" heroes	The characters and stories published by Amalgam Comics.; Crossover characters from DC and Marvel Comics.	Super-Soldier #1 (April 1996)
Earth 2020	Dark Crisis		Three generations of Supermen	Superman v1 #354 (December 1980)
Earth 9872	Infinite Frontier	Pacemaker	The homeland to the supervillain Pacemaker.	Suicide Squad #11 (March 2022)
Earth Omega	Infinite Frontier	Uninhibited	One of two new "centers" of the multiverse after the Infinite Frontier was opened up. It has no vibrational frequency.	Infinite Frontier #1 (June 2021)
Unclassified Worlds
Earth-Prime	post-Multiversity	Superboy-Prime, Laurie Lemmon	A time-shifted version of Earth-Prime, which is now set in modern days, that was created by the reality-altering power of Superboy-Prime during his fight against the Darkest Knight; in the aftermath of the battle, he managed to return to his reality.	Dark Nights: Death Metal The Secret Origin #1 (February 2021)
Earth Goth	post-Multiversity	Gloom Patrol	A gothic-themed universe, home to the Gloom Patrol.	Dark Nights: Death Metal The Last Stories of the DC Universe #1 (February 2021)
The Wild Storm Universe (Earth-W)	post-Multiversity	Jenny Sparks, Michael Cray, and other characters with Grifter, Stormwatch, the WildC.A.T.s, etc.	Contains updated versions of characters and storylines present in the WildStorm Universe.	The Wild Storm #1 (April 2017) The Wild Storm: Michael Cray #1 (December 2017)
Linearverse	post-Multiversity	The Linearverse is an alternate reality where people age slowly, almost imperceptibly. Some heroes and villains have endured for decades.	The history of the Linearverse appears to follow the events depicted in the comics in real time. Therefore it contains elements of the history of Earth-Two, Earth-One and New Earth, as well as the possible futures of Earth-AD and the pre-Zero Hour 31st century.; The Linearverse is based on the concept of “comic book time”, whereby characters do not appear to age despite the comics being published for decades and the fictional world changing to reflect the real world.	Generations Forged #1 (April, 2021)
Unknown	post-Multiversity	The Super Buddies; Justice League 3000	Similar to the pre-Infinite Crisis DC Earth; however, the Blue Beetle (Ted Kord) was not killed by Maxwell Lord here; Home to Keith Giffen and J. M. DeMatteis's Justice League International, the Super Buddies, and Justice League 3000	Justice League 3000 #1 (December 2013)
Unknown	Dark Crisis	Naomi McDuffie, Zumbado, and Brutus	On this world, the degradation of Earth's ozone layer exposed the Earth to a previously unknown type of radiation that gave 29 random people superpowers.; This world functions somewhat differently than most worlds of the multiverse. Its properties are not yet fully understood.	Naomi #5 (May 2019)
Other features of the Orrery of Worlds
The House of Heroes	Multiversity		Located at the center of the Orrery of Worlds, site of the Multiversity/	
Rock of Eternity	Multiversity		Appears to surround the House of Heroes/	
The Bleed	Multiversity		The medium within the Orrery of Worlds that separates the various Earths.	
Between the Orrery of Worlds and the Sphere of the Gods
The Speed Force Wall	Multiversity		Serves as a boundary between the Orrery of Worlds and the Sphere of the Gods.	
Wonderworld	Multiversity		Orbits the Orrery of Worlds.	
KWYZZ	Multiversity		Home of Krakkl.	
Telos	Multiversity		A world where fragments of past DC Comics continuities are collected and preserved.; Was moved into the Earth 2 reality at the end of Convergence.	Convergence #0 (April 2015)
Sphere of the Gods
Dream	Multiversity	Halls of the Endless, the Courts of Faerie, and the Houses of Gemworld		
Nightmare	Multiversity	The Goblin Market, the Land of Nightshades		
New Genesis	Multiversity	The New Gods, the Forever People		
Apokolips	Multiversity	Darkseid and the evil New Gods		
Heaven	Multiversity	Zauriel, the Spectre		
Hell	Multiversity			
Skyland	Multiversity		The godrealms of various pantheons.	
The Underworld	Multiversity		The underworlds of various pantheons, including the Kryptonian Phantom Zone.	
Beyond the Sphere of the Gods
Limbo	Multiversity	Home of the Lost and Forgotten of the Orrery	Situated on the border between the Sphere of the Gods and the Monitor Sphere.; More recently has been identified as an aspect of Hypertime.	
The Monitor Sphere	Multiversity	Former home of the Monitors	Possibly identified with the Sixth Dimension.	
The Source Wall	Multiversity		Separates the Monitor Sphere from the Anti-Life Equation.	
Other Dimensions
The Digiverse	post-Multiversity	A singular totality consisting of a massive compilation of universes where mankind, engineering and artificial intelligence have blended together into one massive mind hive.	Home to technologically advanced species that have evolved beyond the physical realm.	Cyborg (vol. 2) #14 (September 2017)
The Microverse	post-Multiversity	It is a microscopic dimension that is visited by the Justice League of America, which is much smaller than the DC Multiverse itself and which is also a way of access to the same Multiverse; here, it exists as a dimension where they exist as a series of strange beings. it also connects to the Angorverse, a parallel Earth of the DC Multiverse.	It was discovered by Professor Ray Palmer in his investigations of this dimension.	Justice League of America (vol. 5) #16 (December 2017)
The Innerverse	post-Multiversity	Pocket world that is inside the DC Multiverse, where the different dimensions that connect to each other coexist and some universes are interconnected from the same Multiverse	Power Girl (Karen Starr) of Prime Earth and Tanya Spears (Power Girl) were trapped in the Innerverse.	Deathstroke (vol. 4) Annual #1 (March 2018)

==== The Multiverse-2 ====
As it was mentioned in The Multiversity, this multiverse was destroyed by the Empty Hand.

In Infinite Frontier, it is identified as the remnants of the pre-Crisis Multiverse. Pariah uses it to trap various members of the Justice League in private realities that supposedly represent their ideal worlds, as a sort of "honey trap".

==== The Dark Multiverse ====
The Dark Multiverse made its debut on DC's Dark Nights: Metal banner. Characters within this storyline are stated as originating from beyond the core New 52 Multiverse that has been depicted until now and contains Dark Knight Batman analogues of the Flash, Doomsday, Aquawoman, Green Lantern, Wonder Woman, Cyborg, and the Joker. Many of these Earths appear to be highly unstable and pre-apocalyptic, akin to the depiction of the Earths that were consumed during Crisis on Infinite Earths.

Worlds in the Dark Multiverse are designated with negative numbers, when they're designated at all: the Dark Multiverse always contained infinite Earths, even when the Multiverse only contained 52 Earths; and as such, it doesn't lend itself to numbering — especially as there are many ways to get failed variations of each of the Multiversal worlds.

Designation	Notable Inhabitants	Notes	First appearance
Earth -52	The Red Death, a dark anti-hero fusion of Batman and the Flash	On this Earth, Batman fused with the Flash to gain the power of the Speed Force, becoming the Red Death, after he had lost his significant family members, friends and non-metahuman allies.	Batman: The Red Death #1 (September 2017)
Earth -44	The Murder Machine, a cyborg version of Batman	On this Earth, Batman merged himself with a digital copy of Alfred Pennyworth's mind after the real Pennyworth's death, becoming a murderous cyborg.	Batman: The Murder Machine #1 (September 2017)
Earth -32	The Dawnbreaker, an evil Green Lantern version of Batman	On this Earth, young Bruce Wayne became a Green Lantern immediately following the death of his parents. Filled with rage, he disabled his ring's safeguard against lethal force and used its powers to murder criminals.	Batman: The Dawnbreaker #1 (October 2017)
Earth -22	The Batman Who Laughs, an insane Batman and successor of his Earth's Joker after being driven over the edge from being intensely tortured by his nemesis	The Earth -22 Batman became the Batman Who Laughs following a climactic confrontation between the two antagonists, which drove an insane Batman into killing the Joker, while turning him into a new Joker from being subjected to Joker venom.	The Batman Who Laughs #1 (November 2017)
Earth -12	The Merciless, an evil fusion of Batman and Ares	Like the core Multiverse's Earth 12, an alternate future-related reality, in which Wonder Woman dies in the course of unspecified combat, and in which Batman engineers a fusion with Ares in revenge for her death.	Batman: The Merciless #1 (October 2017)
Earth -11	The Drowned, an evil female part-Atlantean version of Batman	Much like the regular Earth 11, all genders are reversed here; On this world, Bryce Wayne mass-murdered all metahumans in revenge for the death of her lover Sylvester Kyle. When Atlantis made contact with the surface world, Bryce murdered their queen, Aquawoman, starting a war with Atlantis. She then had herself surgically altered to gain Atlantean powers.	Batman: The Drowned #1 (October 2017)
Earth -1	The Devastator, a Doomsday version of Batman	On this Earth, Batman infected himself with the Doomsday virus and became a version of Doomsday in order to kill a rogue Superman.	Batman: The Devastator #1 (November 2017)

==== The Cosmic Forge ====
The source of all worlds in the Multiverse. Worlds created by the Cosmic Forge rise up into the Dark Multiverse; the ones that do not fail there then find homes in the Multiverse.

=== Hypertime ===
Existing alongside the Omniverse, Hypertime consists of worlds that were created by divergences in the timestream. It is likely that every iteration of every world in the Omniverse has a counterpart in Hypertime. However, some worlds that exist in Hypertime do not appear to currently have counterparts in the Omniverse.

Worlds in Hypertime do not appear to have a consistent designation system, as the dynamic nature of Hypertime makes the pursuit of such a system a fool's errand. As such, all designations given here are inherently unreliable.

Likewise, a complete catalogue of Hypertime is impossible. What follows is a selection of worlds that do not appear to have a place in the current Local Multiverse, and likely only exist as alternate timelines or former futures, or are clearly features unique to the concept of Hypertime.

Designation	Notable Inhabitants	Notes	First appearance
Earth 2		An “archival Earth”, preserving the Golden Age DCU.	Doomsday Clock #12 (December 2019)
Earth A	Lawless League	Created by Earth One's Johnny Thunder when he messed with Earth One's history.	Justice League of America #37 (August 1965)
Earth 1985	Silver Age DC heroes	An “archival Earth”, preserving the pre-Crisis Earth One.	Doomsday Clock #12 (December 2019)
Titans Tomorrow			Teen Titans Vol. 3 #17 (October 2004)
Flashpoint Earth			Flashpoint #1 (May 2011)
Earth 52		An “archival Earth”, preserving the New 52 era of publications.	Doomsday Clock #12 (December 2019)
Future's End		This is the continuity of Batman Beyond Vol. 5 (New 52), Batman Beyond Vol. 6 (Rebirth), Batman Beyond: Neo-Year, & Batman Beyond: Neo-Gothic; this is not the same continuity as Earth 12 Batman Beyond, which abides in the Omniverse as an alternate version of the DCAU's Beyond timeline.	The New 52: Futures End Vol 1 #0 (April 2014)
Future State			
Justice League: Legacy			Justice League Vol. 3 #26 (August 2017)
The Central Timestream		The Hypertime "designation" for the Metaverse; the same as the Omniverse's Earth 0.	The Kingdom #2 (December 1998)
Vanishing Point			
Limbo			

== Other media ==
=== Cinematic universes ===
==== DC Extended Universe (DCEU) ====
Designation	Notable Inhabitants	Notes	First appearance
(unnamed)	Characters from the DC Extended Universe.	The main universe for the DCEU from Man of Steel until The Flash.	Man of Steel (2013)
(unnamed)	Characters from the television series Adventures of Superman		Superman and the Mole Men (1951)
(unnamed)	Characters from the television series Batman and its related media		"Hi Diddle Riddle" (1.01 – Batman)
(unnamed)	Characters from the films Superman, Superman II, Superman III, Supergirl, and Superman IV: The Quest for Peace		Superman (1978)
(unnamed)	Characters from the films Batman and Batman Returns, Barry Allen / Flash, Henry Allen, Nora Allen, Kara Zor-El / Supergirl, Kal-El, General Zod, Faora-UI	Ignores the events of Batman Forever (1995) and Batman & Robin (1997).; Barry Allen’s mother, Nora, is alive in this reality.; Arthur Curry was never born.; Kal-El died as an infant from General Zod killing him. Instead, his cousin Kara Zor-El / Supergirl ended up crashing on Earth. Without the defeat of Zod, this Earth falls.; This Earth is similar to Earth-89 and the Flashpoint timeline.	The Flash (2023)
(unnamed)	Kal-El / Clark Kent / Superman	This reality is seemingly based on the canceled film, Superman Lives. Its Superman is portrayed by Nicolas Cage, who was supposed to take on the role in the canceled film.	The Flash (2023)
(unnamed)	Barry Allen / Flash, Henry Allen, Bruce Wayne, Arthur Curry	At the end of The Flash, Barry Allen ends up in a universe that he believes is the DC Extended Universe only to be shocked that this Earth's Bruce Wayne looks completely different.	The Flash (2023)
Earths from DCEU comics
(unnamed)	Wonderous Serena, Retrobots	A universe where Serena Williams is Wonder Woman (known as Wonderous Serena) and Diana Prince is a famous tennis player. Serena's main opponent are the Retrobots.	Serving Up Justice #1 (2021)

==== DC Universe (DCU) and DC Elseworlds ====
Designation	Notable Inhabitants	Notes	First appearance
Earth-1	Characters from the DC Universe	While it is the first film set in the DCU, DC Studios co-CEO James Gunn considers Superman (2025) to be the true beginning of this universe, later confirming that every project released after the film will be firmly connected with each other.	"The Collywobbles" (Creature Commandos – 1.01)
(unnamed)	Characters from the DC Universe	In a potential future, Ilana Rostovic formed an alliance with the supervillain Gorilla Grodd, leading her army to conquer the world.	"Chasing Squirrels" (Creature Commandos – 1.04)
Earth-X	The Top Trio (counterparts of Peacemaker and his family), Emilia Harcourt, Rick Flag Jr., Vigilante	In this universe, Nazi Germany ended up winning World War II, and have spread their ideology across the world, including the United States.; In this world, Peacemaker never accidentally killed his brother Keith. Together with his brother and father, they become a team of famous superheroes called the "Top Trio".; This Peacemaker is accidentally killed during a fight with Earth-1's Peacemaker after the two meet each other accidentally, with the latter taking his place.; Rick Flag Jr. is also alive and in a relationship with that universe's Emilia Harcourt.	"The Ties That Grind" (Peacemaker – 2.01)
(unnamed)	Characters from the films Joker and Joker: Folie à Deux	Any media taking place in either of these universes are officially labeled as DC Elseworlds.	Joker (2019)
(unnamed)	Characters from The Batman and related media	Any media taking place in either of these universes are officially labeled as DC Elseworlds.	The Batman (2022)
(unnamed)	Characters from Teen Titans Go! and related media	Any media taking place in either of these universes are officially labeled as DC Elseworlds.	"Legendary Sandwich" (Teen Titans Go! – 1.01)
(unnamed)	Characters from Harley Quinn and related media	Any media taking place in either of these universes are officially labeled as DC Elseworlds.	"Til Death Do Us Part" (Harley Quinn – 1.01)
(unnamed)	Characters from Superman & Lois	Any media taking place in either of these universes are officially labeled as DC Elseworlds.	"Pilot" (Superman & Lois – 1.01)
(unnamed)	Characters from Merry Little Batman and related media	Any media taking place in either of these universes are officially labeled as DC Elseworlds.	Merry Little Batman (2023)
(unnamed)	Characters from My Adventures with Superman and related media	Any media taking place in either of these universes are officially labeled as DC Elseworlds.	"Adventures of a Normal Man" (My Adventures with Superman – 1.01)
(unnamed)	Characters from Constantine	Any media taking place in either of these universes are officially labeled as DC Elseworlds.	Constantine (2005)

=== Animated movie universes ===
==== DC Universe Animated Original Movies (DCAOM) ====
Designation	Notable Inhabitants	Notes	First appearance
Earth-Prime	None	This Earth is shown to be a barren wasteland. It is unknown what exactly caused its desolation, though Owlman reasons that it was mankind who destroyed itself.	Justice League: Crisis on Two Earths (2010)
(unnamed)	Characters from the films Justice League: Crisis on Two Earths and Justice League: Doom		Justice League: Crisis on Two Earths (2010)
(unnamed)	The Crime Syndicate, Slade Wilson, Lex Luthor	An Earth based on Earth-3.	Justice League: Crisis on Two Earths (2010)

==== DC Animated Movie Universe (DCAMU) ====
Designation	Notable Inhabitants	Notes	First appearance
(unnamed)	Justice League, The Rogues, Eobard Thawne / Professor Zoom	The first main Earth of this multiverse.; This Earth was potentially destroyed by Professor Zoom after he altered time.	Justice League: The Flashpoint Paradox (2013)
(unnamed)	Characters from the film Justice League: The Flashpoint Paradox	An Earth created by Professor Zoom after he altered time.; Similar to the Earth shown in the comic book storyline, "Flashpoint".	Justice League: The Flashpoint Paradox (2013)
(unnamed)	Characters from the DC Animated Movie Universe	The second main Earth of this multiverse.; This Earth was created by the Flash after he attempted to fix Professor Zoom's alterations to the timeline.	Justice League: The Flashpoint Paradox (2013)
Earth-1	Characters from the Tomorrowverse	The third and current main Earth of this multiverse.	Superman: Man of Tomorrow (2020)

=== Television series ===
==== Superboy ====
Designation	Notable Inhabitants	Notes	First appearance
(unnamed)	Characters from the television series Superboy		"The Jewel of Techacal" (1.01)
(unnamed)	Kal-El / Clark Kent / Superboy, Lex Luthor, Dr. Winger	An Earth where Superboy killed Lex Luthor	"Roads Not Taken: Part 1" (3.05)
(unnamed)	Kal-El / Sovereign, Lana Lang, Lex Luthor	An Earth where Kal-El became an authoritarian dictator known as the "Sovereign". Lana Lang and Lex Luthor are lovers and leaders of a revolution that aims to overthrow the Sovereign.	"Roads Not Taken: Part 2" (3.06)
(unnamed)	Kal-El, Lex Luthor	An Earth where Kal-El is a child living in the jungle.	"The Road to Hell: Part 1" (3.25)
(unnamed)	Kal-El / Clark Kent / Superman, Lex Luthor	A utopian Earth that's home to an older Superman and a friendly Lex Luthor who has now become a doctor.	"The Road to Hell: Part 2" (3.26)

==== DC Animated Universe (DCAU) ====
Designation	Notable Inhabitants	Notes	First appearance
(unnamed)	Characters from the DC Animated Universe		"The Cat and the Claw: Part 1" (Batman: The Animated Series – 1.01)
(unnamed)	Kal-El / Clark Kent / Superman, Lex Luthor, Lois Lane	An Earth where Lois Lane is murdered by Lex Luthor. This traumatizes Superman and causes him to turn Metropolis into a police state that he runs alongside Luthor.	"Brave New Metropolis" (Superman: The Animated Series – 2.12)
(unnamed)	Justice Guild of America, Injustice Guild	An Earth set in an idyllic version of the 1950s that's home to the Justice Guild of America and their enemies, the Injustice Guild.; On the main DCAU Earth, the events of this reality are comic book stories.; This reality is similar to that of Earth-Two.; This Earth diverged from others in October 1962, when its Cuban Missile Crisis escalated into nuclear war. The Justice Guild died sacrificing themselves to prevent damage to their native Seaboard City.	"Legends, Part I" (Justice League – 1.18)
(unnamed)	Vandal Savage, Bruce Wayne / Batman, Dick Grayson / Nightwing, Tim Drake / Robin, Barbara Gordon / Batgirl	A reality created by Vandal Savage after he traveled back in time and usurped Adolf Hitler as the leader of Nazi Germany, ultimately leading to the Nazi's victory in World War II.	"The Savage Time, Part I" (Justice League – 1.24)
(unnamed)	Justice Lords, Lex Luthor, Wally West / Flash	An Earth where United States President Lex Luthor executes the Flash. This leads the remaining Justice League members to storm the White House, ultimately leading to Superman murdering Luthor. After the deposition of Luthor, the Justice League, now going under the name "Justice Lords", quickly conquer the rest of the Earth.	"A Better World, Part I" (Justice League – 2.11)
Earths from DC Animated Universe comics
(unnamed)	Perry White, Jimmy Olsen, Lois Lane, Lana Lang, Jonathan and Martha Kent, Lex Luthor, Lara, Jor-El, Kal-El / Clark Kent / Superman, Kara In-Ze / Kara Kent / Supergirl	An Earth where Kryptonopolis survives the destruction of Krypton. Sometime later, the surviving Kryptonians, led by Jor-El and Lara, invade Earth. The Superman and Supergirl of this reality are brainwashed by the other Kryptonians to assist in their invasion.; Sometime before the Kryptonian invasion, Lana Lang starts a fire that kills Jonathan and Martha Kent.; Lex Luthor developed technology that can psychologically reprogram supervillains.	Superman Adventures #30 (April, 1999)
Earth-D	Justice Alliance	An Earth where Superman helped the Allies defeat the Nazis in World War II. This leads to the nations of Earth forming a global government and achieving world peace.; Superman is the leader of the Justice Alliance, a parallel to the Justice League.	Justice League Infinity #2 (October, 2021)
Earth-X	Vandal Savage, Kal-El / Karl Kant / Overman	An Earth where Vandal Savage reconstructs the Nazi Party after their defeat in World War II. Savage successfully leads his reformed party to victory over America and establishes the Fourth Reich shortly before 1960. Savage later found the baby Kal-El and raised him to be Overman, the symbol and chief enforcer of the Reich.; This reality is similar to that of Earth 10.	Justice League Infinity #2 (October, 2021)

==== Animated Legion (LSHAU) ====
Designation	Notable Inhabitants	Notes	First appearance
Earth-1	Characters from the Animated Legion (LSHAU, Earth-1)	The universe of the animated series Legion of Super Heroes.	"Man of Tomorrow" (Legion of Super Heroes (TV series) – 1.01)
(unnamed)	Superman X	An alternate 41st century where Imperiex became a galactic conqueror, leading the robot K3NT to create a clone of Superman named Superman X to oppose him.	"The Man from The Edge of Tomorrow Part 1" (Legion of Super Heroes (TV series) – 2.01)

==== Smallville ====
Designation	Notable Inhabitants	Notes	First appearance
(unnamed)	Characters from the television series Smallville	The main Earth of Smallville	"Pilot" (1.01)
(unnamed)		Kal-El's ship did not arrive on this Earth; Lex Luthor, as the President of the United States, ordered a nuclear war that destroyed most of the planet.	"Apocalypse" (7.18)
(unnamed)	Kal-El / Clark Luthor / Ultraman, and other doppelgängers of the Smallville characters	Real designation unknown, informally referred to as "Earth-2", relative to the main Earth of Smallville; Kal-El was raised by Lionel Luthor instead of the Kents, growing up to be the powerful supervillain Ultraman; It was revealed in the comics that this Earth was later destroyed by the Monitors. Chloe Sullivan escaped to the main Earth of Smallville, but was later killed there by the Monitors	"Luthor" (10.10)
Earths from Smallville Season 11
Earth-9		This Earth was destroyed when it was torn apart in a collision with Earth-37, due to a Bleed quake caused by one of the Monitors	Smallville Season 11: Alien #3 (April 2014; mentioned)
Earth-13	Clark Kent, Bruce Wayne	On this Earth, Clark Kent was a human superhero-wannabe, while Bruce Wayne was a psychopathic killer. Earth-13's Clark traveled to the main Earth of Smallville, but was followed and killed by Bruce; This Earth was destroyed when the collision between Earth-9 and Earth-37 broke through into Earth-13. Earth-13's Bruce Wayne remains its last survivor and is held prisoner on Mars in the main universe of Smallville	Smallville Season 11: Alien #3 (April 2014; mentioned)
Earth-37		This Earth was destroyed when it was torn apart in a collision with Earth-9, due to a Bleed quake caused by one of the Monitors	Smallville Season 11: Alien #3 (April 2014; mentioned)
Earth-Majestic	Kal-El / Mister Majestic (Clark Kent's doppelgänger), Henry James Olsen, Lois Lane	Real designation unknown, this Earth derives its name from the superhero Mister Majestic, the alternate version of Superman; When visited by Smallville's Clark and Lois, this Earth was in the process of being destroyed by the Monitors	Smallville Season 11: Chaos #2 (November 2014)
Earth-Omega		Real designation unknown, this Earth derives its name from the Omega symbol used by Darkseid; This Earth was attacked and seized by Darkseid when it collided with his home planet of Apokolips. It later faced a catastrophic battle against the Monitors that destroyed most of the planet.	Smallville Season 11: Chaos #2 (November 2014)

==== Pre-Crisis ====
The CW television series Arrow received its first spin-off The Flash in 2014 with both set in the same fictional universe (Earth-1). The Flash's second season began to explore a shared multiverse with the appearance of Earth-2, while the series' titular character also crossed over with the parallel universe home to Supergirl (which was later designated Earth-38). Additional universes have either been visited or mentioned in dialogue in later seasons of the Arrowverse shows, and some older television series such as the 1990 The Flash series and films such as the 1989 Batman film have been retroactively incorporated into the Arrowverse multiverse as their own parallel universes (with the designation ending in the last two digits of the year it was released).

The 2019 crossover event titled "Crisis on Infinite Earths", inspired by the comic of the same name, destroyed all universes within the Arrowverse multiverse.

Designation	Inhabitants	Notes	First appearance
Earth-1	Characters from the television series Arrow, The Flash (2014), Legends of Tomorrow, Batwoman, the animated web series Vixen and related media	Matt Ryan's version of John Constantine, as seen in the series Constantine, also exists on this universe's Earth. He initially appeared in an Arrow episode per a "one-time-only-deal." but later became a series regular on Legends of Tomorrow.; Contains doppelgängers of Christina "Tina" McGee, Julio Mendez, Tony Bellows, James Montgomery Jesse / the Trickster, and Zoey Clark / Prank from The Flash (1990 TV series), aka Earth-90. In addition, Barry Allen's father Henry is a doppelgänger of that world's Flash's (see below).; Batman has been missing in action since 2015, leaving Batwoman as Gotham City's sole superhero.; Superman and Supergirl do not exist on this universe's Earth.; This universe and its inhabitants, along with refugees from other Earths, were destroyed by an anti-matter wave in "Crisis on Infinite Earths: Part Three".	"Pilot" (Arrow – 1.01)
Earth-2	Harrison "Harry" Wells, Laurel Lance / Earth-2's Black Canary, Jesse Wells, Hunter Zolomon / Zoom, Killer Frost (Caitlin Snow's doppelgänger), Reverb (Cisco Ramon's doppelgänger), Deathstorm (Firestorm's doppelgänger) and other doppelgängers of the inhabitants of Earth-1	A conflict called the War of the Americas happened sometime during the 20th Century, where Zolomon's father James fought.; Paper money is printed on square notes.; Gorilla City and Atlantis exist. The latter is not a lost city and is above the water.; In 2015, Robert Queen operated as the Hood after his son Oliver Queen died in the shipwreck instead. By 2019, Adrian Chase took up the mantle of the Hood.; The S.T.A.R. Labs Particle Accelerator secretly exploded underground, rather than publicly above.; One of the Snarts (Leonard, Lisa or Lewis) is Mayor of Central City.; Jesse Wells, daughter of Harrison, serves as this world's speedster under the name Jesse Quick, as the name "Flash" was tainted by the actions of Zoom impersonating Earth-3's Jay Garrick.; Moira Queen remarried to Malcolm Merlyn at some point.; Thea Queen died of an overdose of the Vertigo drug.; Tommy Merlyn operated as Dark Archer.; A version of Bruce Wayne existed on this Earth, as he provided wisdom to Adrian Chase.; This universe and its inhabitants were destroyed by an anti-matter wave in the Arrow episode "Starling City".	"Flash of Two Worlds" (The Flash – 2.02)
Earth-3	Jay Garrick (Henry Allen's doppelgänger), Joan Williams (Nora Allen's doppelgänger), the Trickster	Jay Garrick is the Flash of this universe's Earth, not Barry Allen.; Zeppelins and Tommy guns are popular here; Jesse Quick also acted as "the Flash" on Earth-3 while Jay Garrick was trapped in the Speed Force.; Following his being released, Garrick planned to retire and train a protege to take his place.; As of 2019, Jay Garrick retired as the Flash due to his diminishing speed and settled down with Joan Williams.; This universe and its inhabitants were destroyed by an anti-matter wave in "Crisis on Infinite Earths: Part Three".	"Paradox" (The Flash – 3.02)
Earth-4		This universe and its inhabitants were destroyed by an anti-matter wave in "Crisis on Infinite Earths: Part Three".	"A Flash of the Lightning" (The Flash – 6.02)
Earth-5		This universe and its inhabitants were destroyed by an anti-matter wave in "Crisis on Infinite Earths: Part Three".	"A Flash of the Lightning" (The Flash – 6.02)
Earth-6		This universe and its inhabitants were destroyed by an anti-matter wave in "Crisis on Infinite Earths: Part Three".	"A Flash of the Lightning" (The Flash – 6.02)
Earth-7		This universe and its inhabitants were destroyed by an anti-matter wave in "Crisis on Infinite Earths: Part Three".	"A Flash of the Lightning" (The Flash – 6.02)
Earth-8		This universe and its inhabitants were destroyed by an anti-matter wave in "Crisis on Infinite Earths: Part Three".	"A Flash of the Lightning" (The Flash – 6.02)
Earth-9	Characters from the television series Titans	Appeared, retroactively, as an alternate universe during "Crisis on Infinite Earths: Part One", during which it was destroyed by an anti-matter wave.	"Titans" (Titans – 1.01)
Earth-10		This universe and its inhabitants were destroyed by an anti-matter wave in "Crisis on Infinite Earths: Part Three".	"A Flash of the Lightning" (The Flash – 6.02)
Earth-11		This universe and its inhabitants were destroyed by an anti-matter wave in "Crisis on Infinite Earths: Part Three".	"A Flash of the Lightning" (The Flash – 6.02)
Earth-12	Harrison Wolfgang Wells (Harrison Wells' doppelgänger), Guardians and the Green Lantern Corps	This Harrison Wells, known as Harrison Wolfgang Wells, speaks with a German accent.; This universe and its inhabitants were destroyed by an anti-matter wave in "Crisis on Infinite Earths: Part Three".	"When Harry Met Harry..." (The Flash – 4.06; mentioned)
Earth-13	Wells the Grey (Harrison Wells' doppelgänger)	This Harrison Wells, known as Wells the Grey, is inspired by the wizard Gandalf the Grey.; Nash Wells' adoptive daughter Maya died on this Earth while on an adventure.; This universe and its inhabitants were destroyed by an anti-matter wave in "Crisis on Infinite Earths: Part Three".	November 15, 2017 post (The Chronicles of Cisco; mentioned)
Earth-14		This universe and its inhabitants were destroyed by an anti-matter wave in "Crisis on Infinite Earths: Part Three".	"A Flash of the Lightning" (The Flash – 6.02)
Earth-15		The Earth of this universe was dead and uninhabited, having been rendered as such in 1986.; This universe was destroyed by an anti-matter wave in "Crisis on Infinite Earths: Part Three".	"The Trial of The Flash" (The Flash – 4.10; mentioned)
Earth-16	Oliver Queen / Green Arrow, John Diggle, Jr. / Connor Hawke, Grant Wilson, Olivia, and Sara Lance (deceased)	First appeared as a potential, future timeline visited by the Legends of Earth-1, where John Diggle, Jr., operating as Connor Hawke, serves as the Green Arrow, and Grant Wilson is Deathstroke.; Cisco Ramon briefly made contact with this universe's Earth.; It later appeared in "Crisis on Infinite Earths" when Lois Lane, Sara Lance, and Brainiac 5 come looking for Jonathan Kent. Earth-16's timeline is akin to Earth-1's so far as that Oliver Queen still became the Green Arrow; however, this Earth's Sara Lance perished on the Queen's Gambit and never became the White Canary.; This universe and its inhabitants were destroyed by an anti-matter wave in "Crisis on Infinite Earths: Part Three".	"Fail Safe" (Legends of Tomorrow – 1.05)
Earth-17	Harrison Wells (Harrison Wells' doppelgänger)	This Harrison Wells speaks with a British accent and wears steampunk attire.; This universe and its inhabitants were destroyed by an anti-matter wave in "Crisis on Infinite Earths: Part Three".	"The New Rogues" (The Flash – 3.04; mentioned)
Earth-18	Jonah Hex	Constantine, Barry Allen, Mia Smoak, and Sara Lance visit this universe's Earth to make use of a Lazarus Pit located in North Dakota in "Crisis on Infinite Earths: Part Two"; This universe and its inhabitants were destroyed by an anti-matter wave in "Crisis on Infinite Earths: Part Three".	"Crisis on Infinite Earths: Part Two" (Batwoman – 1.09)
Earth-19	H. R. Wells (Harrison Wells' doppelgänger), Cynthia / Gypsy, Josh / Breacher, the Accelerated Man, Cisco-19 / Echo	This Harrison Wells, known as H.R., has a hipster style and is recruited to Earth-1 to become a member of Team Flash.; Earth-19 was once attacked by another Earth 25 years ago, so a ban on inter-dimensional travel was put in place, with the punishment of death to any unauthorized breach travel.; This Earth is known to have Blight, hence H.R.'s new-found obsession with coffee during his stay on Earth-1. The same can be said for Gypsy, as she took bags of coffee back with her when she returned to Earth-19.; Al Capone is a vice president.; Gambling is illegal on this Earth.; This universe and its inhabitants were destroyed by an anti-matter wave in "Crisis on Infinite Earths: Part Three".	"Attack on Central City" (The Flash – 3.14)
Earth-20		This universe and its inhabitants were destroyed by an anti-matter wave in "Crisis on Infinite Earths: Part Three".	"A Flash of the Lightning" (The Flash – 6.02)
Earth-21		This universe and its inhabitants were destroyed by an anti-matter wave in "Crisis on Infinite Earths: Part Three".	"A Flash of the Lightning" (The Flash – 6.02)
Earth-22	Wells 2.0 (Harrison Wells' doppelgänger)	This Earth's Harrison Wells, known as Wells 2.0, is part machine.; This universe and its inhabitants were destroyed by an anti-matter wave in "Crisis on Infinite Earths: Part Three".	"When Harry Met Harry..." (The Flash – 4.06; mentioned)
Earth-23		This universe and its inhabitants were destroyed by an anti-matter wave in "Crisis on Infinite Earths: Part Three".	"A Flash of the Lightning" (The Flash – 6.02)
Earth-24	Sonny Wells (Harrison Wells' doppelgänger)	This Harrison Wells, known as Sonny Wells, speaks with an Italian accent.; This universe and its inhabitants were destroyed by an anti-matter wave in "Crisis on Infinite Earths: Part Three".	"Harry and the Harrisons" (The Flash – 4.21; mentioned)
Earth-25	H.P. Wells (Harrison Wells' doppelgänger)	This Harrison Wells, known as H.P. Wells, is a French poet; This universe and its inhabitants were destroyed by an anti-matter wave in "Crisis on Infinite Earths: Part Three".	"Harry and the Harrisons" (The Flash – 4.21; mentioned)
Earth-26		This universe and its inhabitants were destroyed by an anti-matter wave in "Crisis on Infinite Earths: Part Three".	"A Flash of the Lightning" (The Flash – 6.02)
Earth-27		This universe and its inhabitants were destroyed by an anti-matter wave in "Crisis on Infinite Earths: Part Three".	"A Flash of the Lightning" (The Flash – 6.02)
Earth-28		This universe and its inhabitants were destroyed by an anti-matter wave in "Crisis on Infinite Earths: Part Three".	"A Flash of the Lightning" (The Flash – 6.02)
Earth-29		This universe and its inhabitants were destroyed by an anti-matter wave in "Crisis on Infinite Earths: Part Three".	"A Flash of the Lightning" (The Flash – 6.02)
Earth-30		Seen on Jay Garrick's Multiverse map. Per his notes, this world is vegan only.; This universe and its inhabitants were destroyed by an anti-matter wave in "Crisis on Infinite Earths: Part Three".	"A Flash of the Lightning" (The Flash – 6.02)
Earth-31		This universe and its inhabitants were destroyed by an anti-matter wave in "Crisis on Infinite Earths: Part Three".	"A Flash of the Lightning" (The Flash – 6.02)
Earth-32		This universe and its inhabitants were destroyed by an anti-matter wave in "Crisis on Infinite Earths: Part Three".	"A Flash of the Lightning" (The Flash – 6.02)
Earth-33		This universe and its inhabitants were destroyed by an anti-matter wave in "Crisis on Infinite Earths: Part Three".	"A Flash of the Lightning" (The Flash – 6.02)
Earth-34		This universe and its inhabitants were destroyed by an anti-matter wave in "Crisis on Infinite Earths: Part Three".	"A Flash of the Lightning" (The Flash – 6.02)
Earth-35		This universe's Earth had the ability to ride unicorns.; This universe and its inhabitants were destroyed by an anti-matter wave in "Crisis on Infinite Earths: Part Three".	October 18, 2017 post (The Chronicles of Cisco; mentioned)
Earth-37	An unnamed woman	Cisco Ramon briefly made contact with this universe.; This universe and its inhabitants were destroyed by an anti-matter wave in "Crisis on Infinite Earths: Part Three".	October 31, 2016 post (The Chronicles of Cisco; mentioned)
Earth-38	Characters from the television series Supergirl	The existence of extraterrestrials was common knowledge for decades.; This universe's Earth did not contain versions of Earth-1 individuals such as Green Arrow, the Flash, Black Canary, Harrison Wells, Caitlin Snow, or Cisco Ramon; nor did it have locations like S.T.A.R. Labs. However, Central City did exist (as does Mariah Carey), based on Barry Allen's investigation when he accidentally traveled to this Earth from Earth-1.; This universe, which wasn't officially named until the "Invasion!" (2016) crossover event, was previously and informally referred to as "Earth-CBS" by Marc Guggenheim, one of the creators of Arrow.; This universe did contain a version of Batman according to Supergirl's dialogue with Earth-1 Batwoman during "Elseworlds".; This universe, most notably Earth and Argo City, was destroyed by an anti-matter wave in "Crisis on Infinite Earths: Part One", though 3 billion people were evacuated to Earth-1. They are later killed alongside Earth-1's inhabitants in "Part Three" of the crossover.	"Pilot" (Supergirl – 1.01)
Earth-43		This universe and its inhabitants were destroyed by an anti-matter wave in "Crisis on Infinite Earths: Part Three".	"A Flash of the Lightning" (The Flash – 6.02)
Earth-47	Harrison Lothario Wells (Harrison Wells' doppelgänger)	This Harrison Wells, known as Harrison Lothario Wells, is inspired by Hugh Hefner.; This universe and its inhabitants were destroyed by an anti-matter wave in "Crisis on Infinite Earths: Part Three".	"When Harry Met Harry..." (The Flash – 4.06; mentioned)
Earth-48		Home to a bounty hunter/killer who had a magical knife that could penetrate force fields.; This universe and its inhabitants were destroyed by an anti-matter wave in "Crisis on Infinite Earths: Part Three".	"Elongated Journey Into Night" (The Flash – 4.04; mentioned)
Earth-51	Thaddeus Brown	This universe and its inhabitants were destroyed by an anti-matter wave in "Crisis on Infinite Earths: Part Three".	"Gone Rogue" (The Flash – 5.20; mentioned)
Earth-52		This universe and its inhabitants were destroyed by an anti-matter wave in "Crisis on Infinite Earths: Part Three".	"A Flash of the Lightning" (The Flash – 6.02)
Earth-66	Characters from the television series Batman (1966)	Appeared, retroactively, as an alternate Earth in "Crisis on Infinite Earths: Part One", during which it was destroyed by an anti-matter wave.	"Hi Diddle Riddle" (Batman – 1.01)
Earth-73		This universe and its inhabitants were destroyed by an anti-matter wave in "Crisis on Infinite Earths: Part Three".	"Crisis on Infinite Earths: Part Three" (The Flash – 6.09)
Earth-74	Mick Rory, The Waverider, and the Legends	Harbinger visited this universe's Earth and retrieved its Waverider along with Mick Rory and an A.I. based on Leonard Snart.; It is stated that most of this Earth's Legends have retired and one died.; This universe and its inhabitants were destroyed by an anti-matter wave in "Crisis on Infinite Earths: Part Three".	"Crisis on Infinite Earths: Part Two" (Batwoman – 1.09)
Earth-75	Superman (deceased), Lois Lane	Lex Luthor of Earth-38 came to this Earth to kill its Superman in "Crisis on Infinite Earths: Part Two".; This universe and its inhabitants were destroyed by an anti-matter wave in "Crisis on Infinite Earths: Part Three".	"Crisis on Infinite Earths: Part Two" (Batwoman – 1.09)
Earth-76	Characters from the television series Wonder Woman	Appeared, retroactively, as an alternate Earth in the "Crisis on Infinite Earths" tie-in comic.; This universe and its inhabitants were destroyed by an anti-matter wave in "Crisis on Infinite Earths: Part Three".	The New Original Wonder Woman
Earth-85	The Phantom Stranger and characters featured in 1985's Crisis on Infinite Earths	Appeared as an alternate Earth in the "Crisis on Infinite Earths" tie-in comic, where the Phantom Stranger resides.; This universe and its inhabitants were destroyed by an anti-matter wave in "Crisis on Infinite Earths: Part Three".	Crisis on Infinite Earths #1 (April 1985)
Earth-86		Various alternate Supermen gathered in this world's Fortress of Solitude to go after the Council of Luthors.; Appeared as an alternate Earth in the "Crisis on Infinite Earths" tie-in comic.; This universe and its inhabitants were destroyed by an anti-matter wave in "Crisis on Infinite Earths: Part Three".	Crisis on Infinite Earths Giant #1 (January 2020)
Earth-87		This universe and its inhabitants were destroyed by an anti-matter wave in "Crisis on Infinite Earths: Part Three".	"A Flash of the Lightning" (The Flash – 6.02)
Earth-89	Characters from the films Batman (1989) and Batman Returns.	Appeared, retroactively, as an alternate universe in "Crisis on Infinite Earths: Part One", during which it was destroyed by an anti-matter wave.	Batman (1989)
Earth-90	Characters from the television series The Flash (1990), as well as doppelgängers of Stargirl, Firestorm, Hawkman, Hawkwoman, the Ray, Captain Cold, and the Green Arrow.	Appeared, retroactively, as an alternate universe in The Flash (2014) episode "Welcome to Earth-2"; This universe wasn't officially named until the "Elseworlds" (2018) crossover event.; The Monitor destroyed this universe after he deemed its champions incapable of averting an impending crisis during the events of "Elseworlds", though its Flash became its sole survivor.; Earth-90 Flash would later sacrifice himself to save the multiverse during the events of "Crisis on Infinite Earths"	"Pilot" (The Flash (1990) – 1.01)
Earth-96	Characters from the film Superman Returns	Appeared, retroactively, as an alternate universe in "Crisis on Infinite Earths: Part Two".; On this universe's Earth, details are similar to that of the world of Christopher Reeve's Superman films'.; Its Superman is a facsimile to Ray Palmer, who is Earth-1's superhero the Atom.; Perry White, Jimmy Olsen, Lois Lane, and others were killed in a terrorist attack at the Daily Planet.; Clark Kent / Superman mentions his son Jason and alludes to the events of Superman III, a nod to Reeve's films.; This universe and its inhabitants were destroyed by an anti-matter wave in "Crisis on Infinite Earths: Part Three".	Superman Returns
Earth-99	Bruce Wayne / Batman, Kate Kane (deceased), Beth Kane, Luke Fox	Appeared as the future of an alternate universe in "Crisis on Infinite Earths: Part Two".; Its orbit was used as a gathering for the Council of Luthors.; On this Earth's future, Bruce Wayne lost all hope and became a serial killer; going on to kill Superman as well as various villains like Joker, Riddler, and Mr. Freeze. This was exacerbated after his Kate Kane became Batwoman to make him see the error of his ways, only to die while doing so.; Bruce also says Clayface is dead, though it's unclear whether he killed him or not, and Jane Doe is locked up in Arkham.; This universe and its inhabitants were destroyed by an anti-matter wave in "Crisis on Infinite Earths: Part Three".	"Crisis on Infinite Earths: Part Two" (Batwoman – 1.09)
Earth-167	Characters from the television series Smallville	Appeared, retroactively, as an alternate universe in "Crisis on Infinite Earths: Part Two"; The Superman of this Earth gave up his powers so he could have a family.; The Lex Luthor of this Earth became President of the United States, as depicted in a flash-forward during the series finale.; This universe and its inhabitants were destroyed by an anti-matter wave in "Crisis on Infinite Earths: Part Three".	"Pilot" (Smallville – 1.01)
Earth-203	Characters from the television series Birds of Prey	Appeared, retroactively, as an alternate Earth in "Crisis on Infinite Earths: Part Three", during which it was destroyed by an anti-matter wave.	"Pilot" (Birds of Prey – 1.01)
Earth-221	Harrison Sherloque Wells (Harrison Wells' doppelgänger) and Jervis Tetch / the Mad Hatter	This Harrison Wells speaks with a French accent and is the Multiverse's greatest detective.; Sherloque and his partner Watsune battled this Earth's Mad Hatter; Watsune died facing him alone.; This universe and its inhabitants were destroyed by an anti-matter wave in "Crisis on Infinite Earths: Part Three".	"The Death of Vibe" (The Flash – 5.03; mentioned)
Earth-260		This universe and its inhabitants were destroyed by an anti-matter wave in "Crisis on Infinite Earths: Part Three".	"A Flash of the Lightning" (The Flash – 6.02)
Earth-494		This universe and its inhabitants were destroyed by an anti-matter wave in "Crisis on Infinite Earths: Part Three".	"A Flash of the Lightning" (The Flash – 6.02)
Earth-666	Characters from the television series Lucifer	Appeared, retroactively, as an alternate universe in "Crisis on Infinite Earths: Part Three"; Lucifer knows John Constantine of Earth-1 and is aware of the multiverse.; Lucifer's cameo is set during the five-year period before the events of his series.; This universe and its inhabitants were destroyed by an anti-matter wave in "Crisis on Infinite Earths: Part Three".	"Pilot" (Lucifer 1.01)
Earth-719	Maya (Allegra Garcia's doppelgänger)	Nash Wells adopted Maya after she tried to steal an artifact from him on one of his adventures.; This universe and its inhabitants were destroyed by an anti-matter wave in "Crisis on Infinite Earths: Part Three".	"The Exorcism of Nash Wells" (The Flash – 6.15)
Earth-827		This universe and its inhabitants were destroyed by an anti-matter wave in "Crisis on Infinite Earths: Part Three".	"A Flash of the Lightning" (The Flash – 6.02)
Earth-898		This universe and its inhabitants were destroyed by an anti-matter wave in "Crisis on Infinite Earths: Part Three".	"A Flash of the Lightning" (The Flash – 6.02)
Earth-1938	Lex Luthor	Appeared as an alternate Earth in the "Crisis on Infinite Earths" tie-in comic.; This universe and its inhabitants were destroyed by an anti-matter wave in "Crisis on Infinite Earths: Part Three".	Crisis on Infinite Earths Giant #1 (January 2020)
Earth-D	Characters from DC Comics' Earth-D	Appeared as an alternate Earth in the "Crisis on Infinite Earths" tie-in comic.; This universe and its inhabitants were destroyed by an anti-matter wave in "Crisis on Infinite Earths: Part Three".	Legends of the DC Universe: Crisis on Infinite Earths (February 1999)
Earth-F	Characters from the 1940s animated film series Superman	Appeared as an alternate Earth in the "Crisis on Infinite Earths" tie-in comic.; This universe and its inhabitants were destroyed by an anti-matter wave in "Crisis on Infinite Earths: Part Three".	Superman (1941)
Earth-N52	Characters from DC Comics' New 52 Prime Earth	Appeared as an alternate Earth in the "Crisis on Infinite Earths" tie-in comic.; This universe and its inhabitants were destroyed by an anti-matter wave in "Crisis on Infinite Earths: Part Three".	Flashpoint #5 (August 2011)
Earth-X (Erde-X)	Characters from the web series Freedom Fighters: The Ray and doppelgängers of the inhabitants of Earth-1, Earth-2, and Earth-38	On this universe's Earth, the Axis Powers won World War II after Nazi Germany successfully developed their atomic bombs before the United States did.; Adolf Hitler died in 1994 under an unknown circumstance.; This Earth's timeline was akin to Earth-1, Earth-2, and Earth-38's to a certain degree, such as its Oliver Queen becoming a trained archer, Kara Zor-El's arrival after the planet Krypton's apocalyptic demise, and Quentin Lance fathering Laurel and Sara Lance.; The Freedom Fighters consist of the Ray of Earth-1, Uncle Sam, the Black Condor, the Human Bomb, the Phantom Lady, a version of the Red Tornado, General Winn Schott, and Citizen Cold (an alternate, heroic version of Captain Cold).; Members of the New Reischmen include Overgirl (an alternate version of Supergirl), the Dark Arrow (an alternate version of the Green Arrow), the Black Arrow (a look-alike of the Green Arrow), Blitzkrieg (a variation of the Flash), a version of Tommy Merlyn who operated as Prometheus, an alternate version of Metallo, and Siren-X (an alternate version of Earth-1's Black Canary and Earth-2's Black Siren). Earth-1's Reverse-Flash was also involved with them.; Quentin Lance was a Sturmbannführer of the New Reich.; This universe and its inhabitants were destroyed by an anti-matter wave in "Crisis on Infinite Earths: Part One".	"Crisis on Earth-X, Part 1" (Supergirl – 3.08)
(unnamed)	Hell's Wells (Harrison Wells' doppelgänger)	This Harrison Wells, known as "Hell's Wells", is a cowboy.; This universe and its inhabitants were destroyed by an anti-matter wave in "Crisis on Infinite Earths: Part Three".	"The New Rogues" (The Flash – 3.04; mentioned)
(unnamed)	Harrison Wells (Harrison Wells' doppelgänger)	This Harrison Wells speaks with a French accent and is a mime.; This universe and its inhabitants were destroyed by an anti-matter wave in "Crisis on Infinite Earths: Part Three".	"The New Rogues" (The Flash – 3.04; mentioned)
(unnamed)	Harrison Nash Wells / Pariah (Harrison Wells' doppelgänger)	This Harrison Wells is an adventurer who would later become a "Pariah" for freeing the Anti-Monitor.; This universe and its inhabitants were destroyed by an anti-matter wave in "Crisis on Infinite Earths: Part Three".	"Dead Man Running" (The Flash – 6.03)
(unnamed)		A universe which nearly destroyed Earth-19.; This universe and its inhabitants were destroyed by an anti-matter wave in "Crisis on Infinite Earths: Part Three".	"Dead or Alive" (The Flash – 3.11)
(unnamed)		The Earth of this universe was described as volcano-like.; This universe and its inhabitants were destroyed by an anti-matter wave in "Crisis on Infinite Earths: Part Three".	"Dead or Alive" (The Flash – 3.11)
(unnamed)	Characters from the television series Black Lightning	Established as an alternate universe in "The Book of Resistance: Chapter Four: Earth Crisis" (Black Lightning – 3.09), during which it was destroyed by an anti-matter wave.	"The Resurrection" (Black Lightning – 1.01)
Unknown		This universe and its inhabitants were destroyed by an anti-matter wave in "Crisis on Infinite Earths: Part Three".	"A Flash of the Lightning" (The Flash – 6.02)
Unknown		This universe and its inhabitants were destroyed by an anti-matter wave in "Crisis on Infinite Earths: Part Three".	"A Flash of the Lightning" (The Flash – 6.02)
Vanishing Point		Exists outside of time and space.; It was utilized by the Time Masters as their base of operations before they were killed by the Legends.; It was the location of the Oculus Wellspring, before its destruction at the hands of Leonard Snart.; Its remains were used as a base of operations for the Legion of Doom in their quest to acquire the Spear of Destiny.; After the destruction of the multiverse in "Crisis on Infinite Earths: Part Three", the seven paragons were sent here by Pariah to keep them safe from the Anti-Monitor.	"Pilot, Part 1" (Legends of Tomorrow – 1.01)

The NBC series Powerless (2017), which aired alongside the Arrowverse series, has been informally referred to by its producers as existing on "Earth-P". Ezra Miller's Barry Allen from the DC Extended Universe makes a cameo appearance in "Crisis on Infinite Earths: Part Four".

===== Post-Crisis =====
At the end of "Crisis on Infinite Earths", a new multiverse was created, notably merging Earth-1, Earth-38, the Earth of Black Lightning into the new Earth-Prime, as well as creating new Earths, or restoring others. Guggenheim also confirmed the characters from Smallville who existed on the previous Earth-167 survived. Guggenheim had wanted there to only be the single, new Earth-Prime that remained at the end of the crossover, but had that happened, the crossover would not have been able to visit the worlds of other DC properties. A compromise was done, where these properties were put back to various Earths in the multiverse, and the Arrowverse series were combined to a single Earth.

Designation	Inhabitants	Notes	First appearance
Earth-Prime	Characters from the television series Arrow, The Flash (2014), Supergirl, Legends of Tomorrow, Black Lightning, Batwoman, and related media	This Earth consists of inhabitants from the previous Earth-1, Earth-2, Earth-3, Earth-38, and Black Lightning's unnamed Earth.; Inhabitants were initially not aware of the creation of the new multiverse and believed it does not exist. They become aware following Oliver Queen / Spectre explaining to Barry Allen that he created a new multiverse beyond Earth-Prime during "Crisis".	"Crisis on Infinite Earths: Part Five" (Legends of Tomorrow – 5.special episode)
Earth-2	Characters from the television series Stargirl	Established as an alternate universe in "Crisis on Infinite Earths: Part Five".; This Earth contains versions of the Justice Society of America and the Seven Soldiers of Victory.	"Crisis on Infinite Earths: Part Five" (Legends of Tomorrow – 5.special episode)
Earth-9	Characters from the television series Titans	Re-established as an alternate universe in "Crisis on Infinite Earths: Part Five".	"Titans" (Titans – 1.01)
Earth-12	Characters from the film Green Lantern, including the Guardians and the Green Lantern Corps	Retroactively established as an alternate universe in "Crisis on Infinite Earths: Part Five".	Green Lantern
Earth-19	Characters from the television series Swamp Thing	Retroactively established as an alternate universe in "Crisis on Infinite Earths: Part Five".	"Pilot" (Swamp Thing – 1.01)
Earth-21	Characters from the television series Doom Patrol	Retroactively established as an alternate universe in "Crisis on Infinite Earths: Part Five".	"Pilot" (Doom Patrol – 1.01)
Earth-96	Characters from the film Superman Returns	Re-established as an alternate universe in "Crisis on Infinite Earths: Part Five".	Superman Returns
Earth-4125	Ryan Wilder / Red Death	Initially believed to be an alternate timeline to Earth-Prime rather than an alternate earth.; Batman does not exist, Ryan Wilder was adopted by the Waynes until they were murdered in Crime Alley, Iris West was accidentally killed, and the heroes of this Earth attempted to stop a rogue Red Death.	"The Mask of the Red Death, Part 1" (The Flash – 9.04)
(unnamed)	Characters from the series Superman & Lois, John Diggle	Established as an alternate universe in the season 2 finale.; Superman was the only super-powered hero of this universe before his sons powers manifested.	"Pilot" (Superman & Lois – 1.01)
(unnamed)	John Henry Irons, Natalie Irons, Lois Lane, Sam Lane, Superman, Tal-Rho	This Earth features a Superman who turns evil, assists this Earth's version of Tal-Rho in leading an army of Kryptonian-possessed people, and kills Lois Lane. John Henry Irons and Natalie Irons were from this Earth until they were displaced on the unnamed Earth where Superman & Lois is set on.	"Holding the Wrench" (Superman & Lois – 1.08)
(unnamed)	Brainiac 5, Priestess Selena and her followers	This Earth is currently trapped in a bottle awaiting a potential return.	"The Bottle Episode" (Supergirl – 5.10)
Bizzaro World	Bizarro versions of Superman, Lois Lane, Jon-El, Jordan-El, Tal-Rho, Sam Lane, Lana Lang, Ally Allston, Mitch Anderson	This Earth is the obsession of the Inverse Cult led by Ally Allston who has allied with the Bizarro World version of Ally. The planet is cube shaped and "Bizarre" versions of the inhabitants of the Superman & Lois earth exist here, and they speak in reverse to the inhabitants of the other earth. A Bizarre version of Clark came from here before intruding into the other earth to kill its version of Ally Allston.	"Tried and True" (Superman & Lois – 2.06)
Mirrorverse	Mirror versions of Eva McCulloch, Iris West Allen, David Singh and Kamilla Hwang.	This universe was accidentally uncovered by Iris West-Allen while investigating Eva McCulloch, who disappeared in the first particle accelerator explosion. A Mirror version of McCulloch started an invasion from there using various duplicates before being stopped by Team Flash.	"Love Is a Battlefield" (The Flash – 6.11)
The Phantom Zone	Phantoms, Various Kryptonian Prisoners, Nyxlygsptlnz, and Lex Luthor.	This dimension was used for exiling Kryptonian criminals. Zor-El escaped here to survive the destruction of Krypton. Nyxlygsptlnz, (Known as Nyxly) a princess from the 5th dimension was exiled here by her father. She escaped eventually joining forces with Lex Luthor, who eventually joined her in return exile. Zor-El was rescued by Supergirl, and is not a resident there any longer.	"Rebirth" (Supergirl – 6.01)

===== Transmultiversal multiverse =====
The creation of the Flashpoint timeline resulted in the splintering of the multiverse into two halves, leading to a version of the multiverse where Flashpoint occurred, and one where it didn't. The timeline of these two multiverses had a number of differences, with the no-Flashpoint multiverse having a Crisis in 2018 and having an Earth-27 with a significantly changed timeline.

Designation	Inhabitants	Notes	First appearance
Earth-∂	Circadia Senius, Cusimano, Dawn and Don, Giffitz, Green Lantern, Roxxas, Charles Taine, Eobard Thawne / Reverse-Flash, Victoria Vale and Rond Vidar	After the crisis of 2024, multiple Earths notably Earth-1A and Earth-38A experienced a "Crossover effect" that caused their history to merge.	The Flash: The Tornado Twins (October 2018)
Earth-1A	Barry Allen / The Flash, others	As Flashpoint had such a significant effect on the timelines of the entire multiverse, its creation resulted in the creation of Earth-1A, and by extension a second multiverse.; Upon its creation, Earth-1A's history was identical to the pre-Flashpoint history of Earth-1, but the timelines of each universe diverged with the Barry Allen of Earth-1A not creating Flashpoint.	The Flash: Hocus Pocus (October 2017)
Earth-2A	Hunter Zolomon / Zoom	It is assumed that this Earth's history is the same as its Pre-Crisis counterpart.	
Earth-19A	H.R. Wells	It is assumed that this Earth's history is the same as its Pre-Crisis counterpart.	
Earth-27A	Barry Allen, Fred Chyre, Ralph Dibny, Gordon, Clyde Mardon / Weather Wizard, Napier, Cisco Ramon, Hartley Rathaway, Mick Rory, Len Snart, Lisa Snart, Caitlin Snow, Harrison Wells, Jesse Wells, Iris West, Joey West, Madame Xanadu, Anthony Zucco, James Jesse, Power Ring, Superwoman, Eddie Thawne / Johnny Quick, Ultraman, and Bruce Wayne / Owlman	This Earth is home of the Crime Syndicate of America; Meta-humans are referred to as Hyperhumans.; An Earth based on Earth-3.	The Flash: Johnny Quick (April 2018)
Earth-32A	Dinah / Dark Canary and John Stewart	It is assumed that this Earth's history is the same as its Pre-Crisis counterpart.	The Flash: The Legends of Forever (March 2021)
Earth-38A	Alex Danvers, Kara Danvers / Supergirl, Darkseid, Felix Faust, J'onn J'onzz / Martian Manhunter, Clark Kent / Superman, Mon-El, Pryll, Winn Schott / Toy Boy and Vicki V	The timeline of this universe was the same as its counterpart in the original multiverse up until Flashpoint.	Supergirl: Age of Atlantis (November 2017)
Earth-XA		It is assumed that this Earth's history is the same as its Pre-Crisis counterpart.	

==== Teen Titans Go! ====
While the series Teen Titans Go! featured alternate universes very rarely, the multiverse was heavily featured in the films Teen Titans Go! vs. Teen Titans and Teen Titans Go! & DC Super Hero Girls: Mayhem in the Multiverse.

Designation	Notable Inhabitants	Notes	First Appearance
(unnamed)	Characters from the television series Teen Titans Go! and its related media		"Legendary Sandwich" (Teen Titans Go! – 1.01)
(unnamed)	Characters from the television series Teen Titans and its related media		"Final Exam" (Teen Titans - 1.01)
(unnamed)	Characters from the DC Animated Universe	The Batman and Mister Mxyzptlk of this Earth make brief cameo appearances in Teen Titans Go! vs. Teen Titans.	"The Cat and the Claw" (Batman: The Animated Series – 1.01)
(unnamed)	Characters from the television series Beware the Batman	The Batmen of these Earths make brief cameo appearances in Teen Titans Go! vs. Teen Titans.	"Hunted" (Beware the Batman – 1.01)
(unnamed)	Characters from the television series Batman and its related media	The Batmen of these Earths make brief cameo appearances in Teen Titans Go! vs. Teen Titans.	"Hi Diddle Riddle" (1.01 – Batman)
(unnamed)	Characters from the television series The Batman and its related media	The Batmen of these Earths make brief cameo appearances in Teen Titans Go! vs. Teen Titans.	"The Bat in the Belfry" (1.01 – The Batman)
(unnamed)	Characters from Justice League: Crisis on Two Earths' Crime Syndicate Earth	The Owlman of this Earth makes a brief cameo appearance in Teen Titans Go! vs. Teen Titans.	Justice League: Crisis on Two Earths
(unnamed)	Characters from the DC Animated Movie Universe		Justice League: The Flashpoint Paradox
(unnamed)	Characters from the comic book series Tiny Titans		Tiny Titans #1 (April 2008)
(unnamed)	Teen Titans, Doctor Otto von Death	This Earth is based on the TV series Super Friends and other shows based on DC Comics characters produced by Hanna-Barbera.	"Classic Titans" (Teen Titans Go! – 4.33)
(unnamed)	Toon Titans	This Earth is inspired by 1930s cartoons.; The Titans from the main Earth took on similar appearances to the ones' from this Earth in the episode "Squash & Stretch".	Teen Titans Go! vs. Teen Titans
(unnamed)	Characters from Pre-Crisis Earth-One	This Earth's visual style is specifically based on The New Teen Titans comic book series.	More Fun Comics #101 (January 1945)
(unnamed)	Teen Titans	This Earth is steampunk inspired.	Teen Titans Go! vs. Teen Titans
(unnamed)	Teen Titans	This Earth is completely underwater.; This Earth's Robin and Starfire are Merfolk, Raven is half octopus, Beast Boy is a sea turtle, and Cyborg's robot body is based on a submarine.	Teen Titans Go! vs. Teen Titans
(unnamed)	Characters from "The Night Begins to Shine" episodes of Teen Titans Go!		"40%, 40%, 20%" (Teen Titans Go! – 3.10)
(unnamed)	Protein Titans	An Earth where the Teen Titans are animals with the exception of Beast Boy whose just a normal boy. Robin and Raven are the birds they're named after, Cyborg is a rabbit named "Cybunny", and Starfire is a starfish named "Starfishfire".	Teen Titans Go! vs. Teen Titans
(unnamed)	Teen Titans	An Earth where the Titans all have the same "handsome" face Robin does in the Teen Titans Go! episode "The Mask".	Teen Titans Go! vs. Teen Titans
Bizarro World	Teen Titans	An Earth that's home to the Bizzaro versions of the Teen Titans.	"Robin Backwards" (Teen Titans Go! – 2.27)
(unnamed)	Teen Titans	An Earth that's home to a version of the main universe Teen Titans that wear similar outfits to those worn by the Titans in The New Teen Titans comic book series.	Teen Titans Go! vs. Teen Titans
(unnamed)	Teen Titans	An Earth that's home to Leprechaun versions of the Teen Titans.; The Titans from the main Earth took on similar appearances to the ones' from this Earth in the episode "The Gold Standard".	Teen Titans Go! vs. Teen Titans
(unnamed)	Teen Titans	An Earth that's home to pirate versions of the Teen Titans.; The Titans from the main Earth took on similar appearances to the ones' from this Earth in the episode "Forest Pirates".	Teen Titans Go! vs. Teen Titans
(unnamed)	Teen Titans	An Earth that's inspired by medieval fantasy games such as Dungeons & Dragons.	"Riding the Dragon" (Teen Titans Go! – 3.51)
(unnamed)	Teen Titans, Trigon	An Earth that's home to zombie versions of the Teen Titans and Trigon.; The Titans from the main Earth took on similar appearances to their counterparts from this Earth in the episode "Salty Codgers".	Teen Titans Go! vs. Teen Titans
(unnamed)	Characters from the television series DC Super Hero Girls and its related media	While the Teen Titans of Teen Titans Go! have met the Super Hero Girls of this Earth in two episodes of the show released before Teen Titans Go! & DC Super Hero Girls: Mayhem in the Multiverse, the Super Hero Girls do not remember these encounters. The Titans chalk this up to Go! having a looser continuity than DC Super Hero Girls and are annoyed that the Super Hero Girls don't remember them.	"#TheLateBatsby"
(unnamed)	Characters from the television series Super Friends		"The Power Pirate" (Super Friends – 1.01)
Earths from Non-DC properties
(unnamed)	Characters from the television series The Powerpuff Girls	Crossed over with Teen Titans Go! in the episode, "TTG v PPG".	"Escape from Monster Island" (The Powerpuff Girls – 1.01)
(unnamed)	Characters from the television series Scooby-Doo, Where Are You! and its related media	Crossed over with Teen Titans Go! in the episode, "Cartoon Feud".	"What a Night for a Knight" (Scooby-Doo, Where Are You! – 1.01)
(unnamed)	Characters from the television series ThunderCats Roar	Crossed over with Teen Titans Go! in the episode, "Teen Titans Roar".	"Exodus Part One" (ThunderCats Roar – 1.01)
(unnamed)	Characters from the television series The Flintstones	Crossed over with Teen Titans Go! in the episode, "Intro".	"The Flintstone Flyer" (The Flintstones – 1.01)
(unnamed)	Characters from the television series The Jetsons	Crossed over with Teen Titans Go! in the episode, "Intro".	"Rosie the Robot" (The Jetsons – 1.01)

==== My Adventures with Superman ====
In the series My Adventures with Superman, only Season 1 Episode 7 "Kiss Kiss Fall in Portal" has referenced the multiverse.

Designation	Notable Inhabitants	Notes	First Appearance
Earth 1 (also called Earth Prime)	The Lois Lane of this earth discovered the multiverse. A file on her says that she was "Ready to meet with Dad."		"Kiss Kiss Fall In Portal" (My Adventures with Superman – 1.07)
(unnamed) (per Mr. Mxyzptlk) Earth 12 (per the League of Lois Lanes)	Characters from the television series My Adventures with Superman and its related media		"Adventures of a Normal Man Pt. 1" (My Adventures with Superman – 1.01)
(unnamed)	Jon Kent, Alternate versions Lex Luthor, Jimmy Olsen and John Henry Irons.	After Lex Luthor revived Hank Henshaw as Cyborg Superman to serve as a replacement hero for Superman, Henshaw rebelled against Luthor and broke free from his control, commandeering an army of Kryptonian drones to invade Metropolis and the world. In the process, he killed Superman, Lois Lane, Supergirl, Jimmy Olsen, and others who resisted. Jon Kent was sent back in time to stop Henshaw and change the future.	"All's Fair in Love in W.O.R.M.S." (My Adventures with Superman – 3.03)
(unnamed)	Jonathan Lane (alternate version of Jon Kent), Lara Lane, Alternate versions of Lex Luthor, Slade Wilson, and Lois Lane.	In the new timeline, Luthor created the Eradicators and took over the world, with Slade Wilson became his right hand. A small resistance group led by General Lois Lane, sent Jonathan and Lara back in time to kill Luthor and prevent the new future.	"The Death of Superman" (My Adventures with Superman – 3.05)
(unnamed)	Alternate versions of Lois Lane (General Lois Lane), Lex Luthor (Good Lex Luthor), Kara Zor-El (Scion Kara) and Jimmy Olsen (Flamebird Jimmy).	In their universe, Superman lost his powers and was killed during the Hunger Dogs' invasion.	"The Ex Games" (My Adventures with Superman – 3.07)
Earth 12 (per Mr. Mxyzptlk)	Characters from the television series Superman from the 1940s and its related media		"Superman" (the first in a series of seventeen animated superhero short films released)
Earth 14	A seemingly uninhabited Earth that Mxy escaped to after robbing the vault on Earth 1.		"Kiss Kiss Fall In Portal" (My Adventures with Superman – 1.07)
Earth 24	The Lois Lane of this Earth received the key to the city when she was 19.		"Kiss Kiss Fall In Portal" (My Adventures with Superman – 1.07)
Earth 50	Characters from the television series Super Friends		"The Power Pirate" (Super Friends – 1.01)
Earth 52	The Lois Lane of this Earth was a multiple award-winning reporter.		"Kiss Kiss Fall In Portal" (My Adventures with Superman – 1.07)
Earth 508	Characters from the DC Animated Universe		"On Leather Wings" (Batman: The Animated Series – 1.01)
Weird Earth		On this Earth, Superman is a crab.	"Kiss Kiss Fall In Portal" (My Adventures with Superman – 1.07)

=== Video games ===
==== Lego Batman ====
Designation	Notable Inhabitants	Notes	First Appearance
Earth-1	Characters from the video games Lego Batman: The Videogame, Lego Batman 2: DC Super Heroes, Lego Batman 3: Beyond Gotham, and Lego DC Super-Villains	First designated in Lego DC Super-Villains	Lego Batman: The Videogame
Earth-3	Crime Syndicate	An Earth where moralities are swapped. Characters that are traditionally heroes are villains and vice versa.	Lego DC Super-Villains

==== Injustice ====
Designation	Notable Inhabitants	Notes	First Appearance
Earth One	Justice League, The Titans, and Earth One villains.		Injustice: Gods Among Us (April 16, 2013)
Earth Two	Power Girl	Home to this Power Girl who is an alternate version of Supergirl.	Injustice 2 (May 16, 2017) (Mentioned)
Earth Nine	Lois Lane	Lois Lane of this universe lost her Clark Kent to Brainiac, and is pregnant with his child.	Injustice (October 19, 2021)
Earth Twenty-Two	Characters shown in the Main Injustice Universe	A reality where the events of the Injustice: Gods Among Us series occurs.; Superman of this reality went mad and established the One Earth Regime and ruled over the planet following the death of his wife Lois Lane, their unborn son, and the destruction of Metropolis.; Batman forms a team known as the Insurgency, consisting of many former Leaguers and several villains who had not aligned themselves with Superman and others who did not agree with his methods.	Injustice: Gods Among Us #1 (March 2013)
(unnamed)	Green Arrow	Oliver Queen of this universe lost his Dinah Lance to unknown causes.	Injustice: Gods Among Us: Year Two #12 (November 2014)

==== Infinite Crisis ====
Designation	Description
Prime (Earth-0)	Home to legends like Superman, Batman and Wonder Woman, this universe is where hundreds of heroes and villains originate. The keystone upon which the Multiverse rests, and so the Monitor has great interest in maximizing the fighting potential of its populace to better defend it from extra-dimensional threats.
Arcane (Earth-13)	The Shadow League, a cabal of twisted sorcerers, lusted for absolute rule over this Earth. Blinded by ambition, the Shadow League performed a ritual that extinguished the Sun. With eternal night blanketing Earth, the world's most powerful magicians united to reignite the Sun, but its new arcane heart forever altered life on Earth. Heroes and villains have since adapted to their magically infused environment, developing strange new abilities.
Atomic (Earth-17)	As the Cold War was brewing between the world's superpowers, a mysterious object from space crashed into Kansas. Mistaking the crash for a first strike, the United States unleashed its full nuclear arsenal against the Soviet Union, who retaliated. The ensuing nuclear war instantly vaporized 97% of all life on this Earth. The survivors hope that the Earth can be healed, but the nuclear aftermath has left them with scars that never will heal.
Gaslight (Earth-19)	The Victorian Era has swept through this Earth and a prosperous Age of Invention has revolutionized society through powerful steam technology, and this amazing progress is only the beginning. Heroes and villains have begun to emerge from all corners of society, and with them bringing new sources of power and problems far stranger than steam and gaslights.
Nightmare (Earth-43)	Tales of horrors prowling the night were once just legends on this Earth – until the darkness returned. Ancient and terrible powers beyond comprehension awoke and brought with them an army of monsters. In fighting these creatures, some heroes have fallen, twisting into monsters themselves. Heroes and villains have set aside old rivalries and are united in fighting the darkness that threatens to engulf their world forever.
Mecha (Earth-44)	On this Earth, there were no heroes until a league of scientists known as the Justice Consortium created them. Technology had always been advanced on this Earth, but these new robotic creations were able to think and feel and wielded powers beyond anything yet seen. They now defend the Earth from threats within and beyond, particularly the Doom Legion and their villainous assassin robots.
