= Superboy's Legion =

2001 DC Comics miniseries

- Cover to Superboy's Legion, art by Mark Farmer and Alan Davis

Publication information
- Publisher: DC Comics
- Format: Miniseries
- Genre: Superhero
- Publication date: 2001
- No. of issues: 2
- Main character(s): Superboy; Legion of Super-Heroes; Fatal Five; Lex Luthor

Creative team
- Written by: Mark Farmer
- Artist: Alan Davis
- Letterer: Pat Prentice
- Colorist(s): Richard Horie; Tanya Horie
- Editor: Mike McAvennie

Superboy's Legion is a two-issue comic book miniseries, published by DC Comics cover dated February and March 2001, under the Elseworlds imprint. It is written by Mark Farmer, with art by Farmer and Alan Davis. The comic series is a tale about the baby Kal-El, the last survivor of the doomed planet Krypton, arrives on Earth in the 30th century and is found by billionaire R.J. Brande. As Kal grows up, he decides to find other super-powered teens like himself and form a Legion of Super-Heroes. The story uses elements from the Silver Age Comics, most notably the original Legion of Super-Heroes series.

== Plot ==
In the year 2987, R. J. Brande, the galaxy's richest man and head of Brande Industries, discovers a life pod in an asteroid belt containing Kal-El of Krypton, who had crashed in it after being sent to Earth one thousand years ago before Krypton's destruction. Brande adopts Kal, who takes the name Kal Brande, gaining superpowers from Earth's sun and calling himself Superboy. Inspired by legends of superheroes from the 20th century, he uses his powers to help humans.

Every planet in the Milky Way is protected by the Science Police, who are guided by the supercomputer Universo. The Science Police sees Kal as a misfit because he damages public property and makes unregistered flights, and threatens Brande's business if he does not control Kal's behavior. After an argument with Brande, Superboy flies off into space to the former location of Krypton and meets Talu-Katua, a member of the Green Lantern Corps who inspires him to form his own group.

Meanwhile, on the luxury space cruiser Lystrata, lovers Imra Ardeen and Rokk Krinn help defend the ship against an energy being and are helped by Superboy. The trio form a team called Superboy's Legion. Imra calls herself Saturn Girl, and Rokk calls himself Cosmic Boy. They hold a televised membership drive, covered by young reporter Lois Olsen, on Titan. They induct best friends Dirk Morgna (Sun Boy) and Gim Allon (Colossal Boy), Salu Digby (Shrinking Violet), Chuck Taine (Bouncing Boy), Jan Arrah (Element Lad), and Tasmia Mallor (Shadow Lass). Superboy meets Lois and a spark seems to form between the two after the tryouts.

After learning of an asteroid about to collide with the planet Rimbor, the Legion sets out to save the planet. When the Legion's initial plan to destroy the asteroid fails, they call in Thom Kallor (Star Boy), the last survivor of the planet Xanthu. He uses his gravity powers to increase Superboy's mass, allowing him to destroy the asteroid.

The Legion is attacked by the Fatal Five, five of the most dangerous criminals in the galaxy and the ones responsible for Xanthu's destruction. In the battle, Mano burns Star Boy's face with his antimatter touch, Persuader cuts off Cosmic Boy's arm with his axe, and Validus kills Colossal Boy. When the Five leave, they take Brainiac 5 with them under orders from their leader, Lex Luthor.

While the Legion travels to Colu to rescue Brainiac 5, Saturn Girl senses a malevolent presence inside Universo and attempts to find it, but Commissioner Leeto orders the Science Police to gun her down. The Science Police realize Leeto is paranoid, and sees Saturn Girl is their only hope as Universo starts to crash. Saturn Girl discovers the evil presence is diverting Universo's power to Colu. Luthor becomes aware of the interference and snaps Emerald Empress out of Sensor's illusion to stop Saturn Girl. Emerald Empress arrives on Earth and traps Saturn Girl and the others, but Ferro Lad and Karate Kid incapacitate the Emerald Eye and Empress, respectively, and Saturn Girl befriends the Eye, convincing it to serve as Universo's replacement.

On Colu, Superboy rescues Brainiac 5 from Luthor's ship, but Luthor has transferred his mind into an indestructible robot and continues to hack into Colu. After the Legion rescues him from Tharok, Superboy engages Luthor, who reveals he plans to transfer his mind into Superboy's body to achieve immortality. The Legion severs his link to Colu, and Brainiac 5 forces Luthor to face the truth—that he is a computer and the original Luthor is long dead and hidden inside Universo. Furious at this revelation, Luthor attempts to destroy himself and Colu, though Superboy and Ultra Boy are able to save both. In the aftermath, the Legion become the official heroes of the newly formed United Planets. Superboy reconciles with Brande, hands over leadership of the Legion to Ultra Boy, and starts dating Lois Olsen.

== Collections ==
In November 2024, Superboy's Legion was re-released as part of a collection alongside the Elseworlds stories Son of Superman, Supergirl: Wings, and Superman: True Brit.

== See also ==
- List of Elseworlds publications
