= Superman: The Dark Side =

Comic book limited series

Publication information
- Publisher: DC Comics
- Schedule: Monthly
- Format: Limited series
- Publication date: August–October 1998
- No. of issues: 3
- Main character: Superman

Creative team
- Written by: John Francis Moore
- Penciller: Kieron Dwyer
- Inker: Hilary Barta

Superman: The Dark Side is a three-issue comic book limited series published in 1998 by DC Comics as an Elseworlds title, an imprint for stories which deviate from the established continuity. The story reinterprets the origin of Superman, imagining what would have happened had he landed on Apokolips instead of Earth.

== Publication history ==
Superman: The Dark Side was originally published as a standard format comic book from August to October 1998. It was subsequently republished in a trade paperback edition in 1999 (ISBN 1563895269). The series was written by John Francis Moore with pencils by Kieron Dwyer and inks by Hilary Barta.

== Plot ==
Kal-El's rocket is diverted from Earth to Apokolips, where he is raised by Darkseid. Superman becomes an eager participant in the destruction of New Genesis and a willing disciple of Darkseid. Superman later discovers his true origin and leads the New Gods into battle against Darkseid, freeing Apokolips.

In this series, Superman wears black and red armor similar to that of Darkseid's son Orion. This armor has a unique Superman logo on it, consisting of two thunderbolt-shaped S's.

== See also ==
- Alternative versions of Superman
- List of Elseworlds publications
