= Superman: The Feral Man of Steel =

DC comics special

- Cover for Superman: The Feral Man of Steel

Publication information
- Publisher: DC Comics
- Format: Prestige format one-shot
- Publication date: 1994
- No. of issues: 1
- Main character(s): Clark Kent; Sir Richard Burton; Lex Luthor; Lois Lane

Creative team
- Created by: Darren Vincenzo; Frank Fosco; Stan Woch

Superman: The Feral Man of Steel (Superman Annual #6) is a DC Comics Elseworlds special published in 1994, written by Darren Vincenzo, pencilled by Frank Fosco and inked by Stan Woch.

In 19th century India, Kal-El is raised by wolves. The story is loosely based on Rudyard Kipling's Mowgli stories, with added elements of Edgar Rice Burroughs' Tarzan novels.

== Plot ==
=== Tiger, Tiger ===
The first part of the story starts with K'L'L, whose ship crashes deep in the Indian jungle. He is saved from the Bengal tiger Khan by M'R'R, the she-wolf of a pack of Indian wolves. She adopts him and nurses K'L'L as one of her own. When the time comes for M'R'R to present her human child to the tribe, none but her and her mate would speak for the man cub which as Khan points out means that according to the law, the child is to be left in the jungle to die. The black panther Jahd Bahlja speaks for K'L'L and Khan is foiled again. K'L'L grows and starts to develop his powers. An expedition led by Sir Richard Burton and his traveling companion Sir John Ellis is interrupted when the men he has employed shoot and kill M'R'R and one of her cubs. When K'L'L hears the yelps of his mother, he flies to the camp and starts tossing the men like rag dolls, almost killing Sir John. He is only deterred by Sir Richard, who somehow talks K'L'L out of killing his companion. K'L'L grabs the two dead wolves and flies off.

=== Lord of The Wolves ===
While K'L'L mourns, Khan has taken control of the pack, overthrowing A'K'L the old leader. Jahd tells K'L'L what is happening and he rushes to his home, challenging Khan for leadership. In the battle, while Khan puts up a strong fight, even piercing the wild man's skin with his claws, K'L'L kills Khan and becomes the leader of the tribe. He skins the tiger and takes from him "that which earns him the fear and respect of the entire Jungle". He swears to avenge the death of his mother and hunt the Man-Pack that killed her. Jahd shows K'L'L the space ship from which he came and he takes a strange hieroglyph from it, the familiar S-shield. Meanwhile, in England, Sir Richard and Sir Ellis prepare for their next expedition; Lois Lane joins them this time. While in the jungle, they bump into Lex Luthor, who is also after the jungle man. The two groups decide to combine their efforts. The search continues for several days, and one night, two of Luthor's men try to kidnap Lois and steal Luthor's most prized possession, a big green gem he acquired in Africa. Their efforts are stopped, and Luthor's ruthlessness is evident after he executes them both. Moments later, the camp hears the sounds of a stampede coming their way.

=== Civilization! ===
K'L'L and an army of jungle animals attack the camp. The jungle man singles out Sir Richard, who is powerless against him. Only Lois is able to convince the jungle man to stop. The animals leave the camp and Lois starts to teach him some English. K'L'L's education continues, as he is even given an English name: Clark. Everyone is amazed at Clark's progress and abilities until the day Luthor proposes to Lois, offering her the green gem as an engagement present. She refuses and it becomes obvious to Luthor that she has fallen in love with Clark. Luthor becomes infuriated and threatens Lois. While they struggle, Clark comes to the rescue, but when he enters Luthor's tent, the jewel starts to weaken him and causes him to collapse. In a few hours, Luthor and his men seize the opportunity and take over the camp. Sir Richard is tied to a tree and left to die as Luthor sets fire to the camp with Lois and Clark as his prisoners.

=== Perdition's Flame ===
Two months later in England, Lex parades Clark as a sideshow attraction to the world on his way towards forcing K'L'L to assassinate Queen Victoria and take over the country. He has a polished piece of his green jewel affixed to the top of a staff as well as a sword encrusted with more pieces of it as a means to command the wild man of India. He also blackmails him by threatening to hurt Lois. When it comes time however, Clark ultimately refuses to assassinate the queen and attacks Luthor. In the ensuing melee, the building is set on fire and Clark's animal friends escape. Clark is kept at bay by Luthor's sword until Sir Richard appears and duels with Luthor. Sir Richard wins, throwing Lex off the building. Clark saves Lois and Richard and is knighted K'L'L: Sir Clark of Kent by the Queen. His powers bring a new shine to the British Empire, which now comprises one-third of the Earth. Lois and Clark's children all share the same powers as their father and it is assured to the reader that the empire is at the dawn of a new age, one that will never end.

== Characters ==
Most characters in Superman: The Feral Man of Steel are either based on existing DC characters, the cast of The Jungle Book, or the cast of Tarzan.

=== Main ===
- Clark Kent/Kal-El: An alien whose spaceship crashes in the middle of the Indian Jungle, where he is found by wolves and given the name K'L'L (meaning 'white skin' in their language). As he grows, he gains the power to fly, develops invulnerable skin, heat vision, super speed, super strength, and is able to communicate with animals. He resembles both Tarzan and Mowgli.
- Khan: A man-eating Bengal tiger, and K'L'L's first enemy, he is later killed by K'L'L who then skins Khan. He closely resembles Shere Khan from The Jungle Book.
- Jahd Bahlja the Panther: K'L'L's mentor, he saves K'L'L from Khan. He closely resembles Bagheera from The Jungle Book.
- Sir Richard Burton: A British explorer of the Indian jungle who apparently had a relationship with Lois prior to the story.
- Sir John Ellis: Another British explorer who accompanies Sir Richard.
- Lois Lane: A headstrong American woman who falls for K'L'L.
- Lex Luthor: A power-hungry explorer who has traveled the globe in search of riches and fame, this version sports a full head of hair and mutton chops.

=== Secondary ===
- M'R'R, the She-Wolf: A wolf who adopts K'L'L as a child, she is killed by hunters.
- Hathi the Elephant: An Indian elephant and friend of K'L'L, he is a reference to the elephant Hathi from The Jungle Book. In Hindi, Hathi also means 'elephant'.
- Bandar: A monkey and friend of K'L'L who teaches him how to make stone knives and other tools, he is a reference to the Bandar-log from The Jungle Book. In Hindi, Bandar also means 'monkey'.
- Diablo: Luthor's guide, associate, and assistant who helps him enslave Clark.
- Richard Francis Kent: First son of Lois and Clark.
- M'R'R Lane Kent: Second child of Lois and Clark, and their only daughter, she is named after Clark's adoptive mother.
- K'R'K Clark Kent: The last child of Lois and Clark.

== See also ==
- List of Elseworlds publications
