= List of Elseworlds publications =

This is a list of Elseworlds publications from DC Comics, grouped by main character, and in alphabetical order by title.

== Batman Elseworlds ==
- Batman: Thrillkiller – one three-part miniseries and one one-shot collected into one volume:
  - Batgirl and Robin: Thrillkiller (1997) – Barbara Gordon (Batgirl) and Dick Grayson (Robin) as part of the 1960s counterculture.
  - Batgirl and Batman: Thrillkiller '62 (1998) – Bruce Wayne becomes Batman in the sequel.
- Batman & Captain America (1996) – Marvel/DC crossover; a Golden Age adventure teaming Batman and Robin with Captain America and Bucky of Marvel Comics against the Joker and the Red Skull.
- Batman/Demon: A Tragedy (2000) – Bruce Wayne is possessed by Etrigan the Demon.
- Tales of the Multiverse: Batman – Vampire (2007) – three graphic novels collected into one volume (SC):
  - Batman & Dracula: Red Rain (1991) – Batman faces off against Dracula and must become a vampire himself to effectively face his nemesis.
  - Batman: Bloodstorm (1994) – Batman fights an army of vampires led by the Joker in Gotham City while battling a hunger for blood that dooms him in the end.
  - Batman: Crimson Mist (1998) – A now-fully vampiric and evil Batman is revived by a tormented Alfred and goes on a killing spree of all of his former enemies.
- Batman/Houdini: The Devil's Workshop (1993) – Batman teams up with Harry Houdini to fight child-stealing vampires in 1907.
- Batman/Lobo (2000) – The Joker hires Lobo to take out the Dark Knight. After Lobo kills everyone close to Batman, the Joker is forced to call him off after the revelation that the Joker is Batman's long-lost twin, Joey Wayne.
- Batman: The Blue, the Grey, and the Bat (1992) – Batman and Robin in the American Civil War.
- Batman: The Book of the Dead (1999) – The Waynes are a rich archaeologist family and the story revolves around a lesser-known but important Egyptian bat-god.
- Batman: Brotherhood of the Bat (1995) – Fifty years in the future, Batman is dead and the planet is within the grip of a plague set off by Ra's al Ghul, who uses Bruce Wayne's various rejected costume designs to create a league of costumed assassins and is confronted by Tallant, the son of Batman and his daughter Talia al Ghul.
  - Sequel: Batman: League of Batmen (2001) – Tallant's efforts to cure the plague with his own costumed Bat-force are hampered by a still-alive, but much more demonic, Ra's al Ghul.
  - Prequel: Batman: KnightGallery (1996) – Collection of artwork on which the two stories were based, written as a journal of Bruce Wayne found in the future many years after his death.
- Batman: Castle of the Bat (1994) – Based on the story of Frankenstein, Bruce Wayne attempts to resurrect his father into an avenging Bat-Man to discover who killed his parents.
- The Batman Chronicles (1995–2001) – A quarterly Batman title covering single and/or not necessarily within continuity stories. Two all-Elseworlds issues were published:
  - Issue #11 (winter 1998): Features the stories "The Berlin Batman"; "The Bride of Leatherwing" (a sequel to "Leatherwing" from Detective Comics Annual #7 (1994)) and "Curse of the Cat-Woman".
  - Issue #21 (summer 2000): Features the stories "Apocalypse Girl"; "Mystery of Citizen Wayne" (a sequel to "Citizen Wayne" from Batman: Legends of the Dark Knight Annual #4 (1994)) and "Silent Tale of the Bat".
- Batman/Tarzan: Claws of the Cat-woman (1999) – Dark Horse Comics/DC crossover; a 1930s Batman teams up with Lord Greystoke/Tarzan to assist the priestess of an African cat-cult in protecting her people's treasures from the Two-Face-like mercenary Finnigan Dent.
- Batman: Dark Allegiances (1996) – Batman, Catwoman, and Alfred Pennyworth (Robin) as OSS agents during World War II.
- Batman/Dark Joker: The Wild (1993) – A fantasy tale of the evil wizard known as Dark Joker and his battles against the avenging Bat-Man.
- Batman: Dark Knight Dynasty (1997) – A centuries-old feud between the Wayne family and Vandal Savage begins with Bruce Wayne's ancestor Sir Joshua at the time of the Knights Templar, and ends with his descendant, Brenda Wayne, in the Gotham of the 25th century.
- Batman: Dark Knight of the Round Table (1998) – Batman as a knight in King Arthur's court.
- Batman: Detective No. 27 (2003) – In 1938, Bruce Wayne becomes a secret crimefighter without donning a costume. The title is a reference to Detective Comics #27, the comic book in which Batman first appeared.
- Batman: The Doom That Came to Gotham (2000) – Bruce Wayne is a 1920s pulp fiction adventurer fighting Lovecraft-inspired monsters. The story is co-written by Mike Mignola, creator of Hellboy, in which similar villains appear.
- Batman: The Golden Streets of Gotham (2003) – Turn-of-the-century Gotham is full of greedy industrialists who gain profit by degrading and tormenting their workers. Bruno Vaneko is a railroad worker whose parents were factory workers killed in a fire akin to the infamous Triangle Shirtwaist Factory fire. Desperate for justice, he dons a bat costume and joins a citywide worker strike.
- Batman: Gotham Noir (2001) – A film noir homage set in the late 1940s. The story features James Gordon as a main character.
- Batman: Haunted Gotham (1999–2000) – Gotham has been taken over by the Dark Lords of Hell and escape is impossible. After watching his parents being killed by a werewolf, Bruce Wayne becomes the Batman, as per his father's instructions from beyond the grave, and sets out to free Gotham with the help of a living skeleton named Cal and a shapeshifting gypsy seer named Cat Majik.
- Batman: Hollywood Knight (2001) – A severe head trauma causes an actor who plays Batman in film serials to believe that he actually is the Dark Knight.
- Batman: Holy Terror (1991) – The first story to carry the Elseworlds logo and the second officially published Elseworlds story. The Reverend Bruce Wayne becomes Batman to fight corruption in a theocratic future world.
- Batman: I, Joker (1998) – A futuristic Gotham City is led by a cult that follows Batman's descendant, a self-proclaimed god known only as the Bruce. The current Joker must find a way to survive long enough to face his nemesis and free Gotham from his influence.
- Batman: In Darkest Knight (1994) – Bruce Wayne becomes the Green Lantern of Earth.
- Batman: Manbat (1995)
- Batman: Masque (1997) – Set at the Gotham Opera House in the 1890s, the story is inspired by The Phantom of the Opera, with Batman and Two-Face sharing the Phantom role.
- Batman: Nevermore (2003) – Batman teams with then-newspaper reporter Edgar Allan Poe to solve a series of raven-themed murders.
- Batman: Nine Lives (2002)
- Batman: Nosferatu (1999) – Sequel to Superman's Metropolis which combines the Batman mythos with the films Nosferatu: A Symphony of Horror and The Cabinet of Dr. Caligari.
- The Batman of Arkham (2000) – Set in 1900, Bruce Wayne is an early psychiatrist and the head of Arkham Asylum, with Jonathan Crane as his corrupt assistant.
- Batman: The Order of Beasts (2004) – Batman attempts to break up a spy ring in England during World War II. This story is co-written and illustrated by Eddie Campbell.
- Batman: Reign of Terror (1998) – Set during the French Revolution, with Bruce Wayne as a French nobleman who becomes a masked crimefighter carrying convicted innocents out of France, a la The Scarlet Pimpernel.
- Batman: Scar of the Bat (1996) – A masked avenger helps Eliot Ness take on Al Capone in 1920s Prohibition Chicago.
- Batman: Two Faces (1998) – A recasting of Strange Case of Dr. Jekyll and Mr. Hyde, as a Victorian era Bruce Wayne tries to purge both his own evil side, which is a version of the Joker, and that of Two-Face. The story is followed by The Superman Monster.
- Catwoman: Guardian of Gotham (1999) – A heroic Catwoman (based in Kyle Manor) battles a psychotic Batman.
- Daredevil/Batman: Eye for an Eye (1997) – Marvel/DC crossover, officially labelled an Elseworlds tale. Batman teams up with Daredevil to take on Two-Face and Mister Hyde.
  - Sequel: Batman/Daredevil: King of New York (1999, DC) (Note: Although not officially labelled an Elseworlds tale, the story is a sequel to Daredevil/Batman: Eye for an Eye (1997), which was labelled as an Elseworlds tale.) – Batman and Daredevil team up once again to stop Scarecrow from taking over Kingpin's criminal empire in Manhattan.
- Gotham by Gaslight (1989) – The first officially published Elseworlds story, though it does not carry the Elseworlds logo. A Victorian era Batman fights Jack the Ripper.
  - Sequel: Batman: Master of the Future (1991) – The Victorian Batman faces off against a maniacal genius who is unwilling to allow the 20th-century's technological advances to enter Gotham.
- Robin 3000 (1992) – A teenage descendant of Bruce Wayne battles an alien invasion at the turn of the next millennium.

== Superman Elseworlds ==
- Son of Superman (1999) – With Superman missing, Lex Luthor takes control of the Justice League. Meanwhile, Superman's young son Jonathan begins manifesting superpowers and rebelling against the "heroes" he comes across.
- Superboy's Legion (2001) – Inspired by the heroes of the 20th century, a 30th-century-raised Superboy forms his own Legion of Super-Heroes.
- Supergirl: Wings (2001) – A reworking of the Supergirl as Earth angel story, in which Matrix is a cynical guardian angel to Linda Danvers. This story features angelic versions of various DCU characters.
- Superman: A Nation Divided (1998) – Superman as a Union soldier during the American Civil War.
- Superman: At Earth's End (1995) – Earth has suffered through an apocalypse and Superman attempts to save Gotham City.
- Superman: The Dark Side (1998) – Kal-El's rocket lands on Apokolips and Superman is raised by Darkseid.
- Superman: Distant Fires (1998) – A nuclear holocaust destroys civilization and deprives Superman and many other surviving heroes of their powers.
- Superman, Inc. (1999) – Superman is raised to suppress his powers and becomes a sports superstar and a ruthless businessman.
- Superman: Kal (1995) – Baby Kal-El lands in medieval England, where he grows up to become a blacksmith and forges the sword Excalibur and a suit of armor out of the metal of his spaceship.
- Superman: The Last Family of Krypton (2010) – Jor-El, Lara and baby Kal-El all arrive on Earth.
- Superman: Last Son of Earth (2000) – The infant Clark Kent arrives on the planet Krypton in a rocket from the doomed planet Earth. While struggling to find his place there as an adult, he discovers a Green Lantern power ring.
  - Sequel: Superman: Last Stand on Krypton (2003)
- Superman's Metropolis (1997) – The first story of a trilogy that is continued in Batman: Nosferatu and Wonder Woman: The Blue Amazon and which combines the Superman mythos with Fritz Lang's film Metropolis.
- The Superman Monster (1999) – A Frankenstein pastiche in which Vicktor Luthor finds a crashed rocket with a dead infant inside and sets about bringing it back to life using his experimental machinery. This story is the sequel to Batman: Two Faces.
- Superman: Red Son (2003) – Kal-El's rocket crash-lands in Ukraine, and the Man of Steel becomes the U.S.S.R.'s main hero.
- Superman: Speeding Bullets (1993) – Kal-El is raised by Thomas and Martha Wayne, who are murdered by a mugger, and he becomes a superpowered version of Batman.
- Superman/Tarzan: Sons of the Jungle (2001) – Dark Horse Comics/DC crossover; Kal-El is raised by apes in this amalgamation of the two characters.
- Superman: True Brit (2004) – Kal-El lands in the English countryside and is raised to be "ordinary" and not draw attention. Nonetheless, he becomes a British superhero, before the tabloids try to knock him down. This story was co-written by Monty Python's John Cleese and long-time Python chronicler Kim "Howard" Johnson.
- Superman: War of the Worlds (1998) – The Golden Age Superman encounters the Martian invaders from H. G. Wells's The War of the Worlds in 1938.
- Superman/Wonder Woman: Whom Gods Destroy (1997) – Superman and Wonder Woman in a story that involves Greek mythology and Nazis in an alternate future.
- Superman: Yes, Tyrone, There is a Santa Claus (2006) – A little boy writes a letter to the Daily Planet asking if there is a Santa Claus, prompting Superman to dress up as Santa Claus and visit the boy, only to learn that he has been beaten to it by "Bat-Santa". It was published as the only Elseworlds story in the DC Infinite Holiday Special.

== Superman/Batman Elseworlds ==
- Elseworld's Finest (1997) – Batman and Superman in a 1920s pulp adventure; the title is a play on the phrase World's Finest, which was the title of a long-running DC Comics series that featured these two heroes in team-up stories.
- Elseworld's Finest: Supergirl & Batgirl (1998) – In a world in which Bruce Wayne never became Batman and the infant Kal-El did not survive the destruction of Krypton, the orphaned Barbara Gordon becomes Gotham's near-dictatorial protector as Batgirl and Kara Zor-El joins the Justice Society as Supergirl. No connection to the above story with a similar title.
- Superman & Batman: Doom Link (1995) – A cyberpunk story. This book was only available with Kenner Toys' Cyber-Link Superman and Batman Action Figure Two-Pack.
- Superman & Batman: Generations (1998–1999) – A retelling of the Superman and Batman mythos, with the heroes and characters in the DC Universe aging in real-time from a first meeting in 1939 and stretching onwards.
  - Sequel: Superman & Batman: Generations II (2001), focusing on characters in the DC Universe besides Superman and Batman.
  - Sequel: Superman & Batman: Generations III (2003), covering a 1,000-year battle against Darkseid.
- Superman and Batman: World's Funnest (2000) – Extra-dimensional imps Mister Mxyzptlk and Bat-Mite chase each other throughout the DC Multiverse.
- Superman/Batman: Saga of the Super Sons (2007) - Not labelled as an Elseworlds, but collects the imaginary stories from World's Finest Comics featuring the teenage sons of Superman and Batman and includes the "Superman Jr. Is No More!" story from the cancelled Elseworlds 80-Page Giant #1 (in the title, Super Sons is spelled without a hyphen).

== Justice League Elseworlds ==
- JLA: Act of God (2000–2001) – When a strange energy hits Earth, heroes and villains alike lose their superpowers. Some refuse to give in to defeat, while some disappear into the woodwork and others undergo a rebirth as the Phoenix Group.
- JLA: Age of Wonder (2003) – A Justice League created during the Industrial Age.
- JLA: Created Equal (2000) – A cosmic plague hits Earth, killing all men except for Superman and Lex Luthor.
- JLA: Destiny (2002) – In a world where Superman and Batman never existed, Thomas Wayne creates his own Justice League.
- JLA: The Island of Dr. Moreau (2002) – Set in the 1880s, the League is combined with Dr. Moreau's animal-men.
- JLA: The Nail (1998) – The world is without Superman after a punctured tire prevents the discovery of baby Kal-El by the Kents. The Justice League is a group of heroes whom the media deem as dangerous aliens as a lethal conspiracy seeks to undermine all that they stand for.
  - Sequel: JLA: Another Nail (2004) – With the discovery of Superman and his addition to the Justice League, the heroes must maintain their good face to the public.
- JLA: Riddle of the Beast (2001) – High fantasy story as young Robin Drake leads the armies of the world against Etrigan the Demon.
- JLA: The Secret Society of Super-Heroes (2000) – Superpowered beings keep their existence a secret and the Justice League is an unaccountable conspiracy.
- JLA: Shogun of Steel (2002) – Set in feudal Japan.
- Justice Riders (1997) – The JLI as a group of marshals, gamblers, inventors and various other characters in the Wild West.
- League of Justice (1996) – A quartet of teenagers find themselves joined up with fantasy fiction versions of the Justice League members.
- Planetary/JLA: Terra Occulta (2002) – An alternate version of the Planetary team meet alternate versions of Superman, Batman, and Wonder Woman. The story is an internal crossover with the WildStorm imprint.

== Justice Society Elseworlds ==
- JSA: The Liberty Files (2004) – two two-issue miniseries collected into one volume:
  - JSA: The Liberty File (1999–2000) – The Justice Society as a special operations team during World War II.
  - JSA: The Unholy Three (2003) – Six years after the events of JSA: The Liberty File, the JSA is recalled to active duty with the addition of Superman.
- The Golden Age (1993) – A story set at the end of the Golden Age of Comic Books as superheroes become targets for an ambitious hero-turned-senator and his protégé new-age hero. (Note: The trade paperback of this story retitles it JSA: The Golden Age.)

== DC Universe Elseworlds ==
- Conjurors (1999) – In a magic-centric reality, the machinations of Jonathan Arcane set those who control magic against those from whom it was stolen.
- Elseworlds 80-Page Giant #1 (1999)
- Flashpoint (1999) – A world where the Flash was the only superhero until he lost the use of his legs.
- Kamandi: At Earth's End (1993) – A grown Kamandi finds himself caught in a battle between Mother and Superman.
  - Sequel: Superman: At Earth's End (1995).
- Kingdom Come (1996)
  - Associated: The Kingdom (1998) – Technically not an Elseworlds story, but a loose sequel to Kingdom Come. The collected series of comic books consists of:
    - New Year's Evil: Gog (1998) – A young boy saved from the Kansas attacks by Superman becomes a prophet to the hero that he deems Heaven-sent, but when he learns of his savior's transgressions, his worldview shatters, and the group of demigods known as the Quintessence attempt to give him a new purpose.
    - The Kingdom #1 (1998) – With Gog on a time-travelling rampage against Superman, the future heroes must band together to save the child of Superman and Wonder Woman. In addition, the Linear Men select a group of younger heroes to assist in the effort.
    - The Kingdom: Nightstar (1998) – Focusing on Mar'i Grayson, the daughter of Dick Grayson (Nightwing) and Starfire, and her efforts to save the child.
    - The Kingdom: Son of the Bat (1998) – Ibn al Xu'ffasch, the son of Bruce Wayne and Talia al Ghul, tries to restore the balance to his reality by recruiting various former villains to his aid.
    - The Kingdom: Offspring (1998) – The son of Plastic Man attempts – in his rather comical way – to prevent the end of the world that he knows.
    - The Kingdom: Kid Flash (1998) – Iris West, daughter of Wally West (Flash) combats her feelings of abandonment from her father, the apathy of her brother, and the crisis that could destroy her reality.
    - The Kingdom: Planet Krypton (1998) – A young runaway working as a Supergirl waitress at Booster Gold's hero-themed restaurant Planet Krypton starts seeing ghosts of other realities; superheroes that may or may not have existed.
    - The Kingdom #2 (1998) – Circumstances force the future Superman, Batman and Wonder Woman to recruit the help of their younger modern-day selves to save the most powerful child in Hypertime in the final clash with Gog.
  - Associated: Justice Society of America Kingdom Come Special: Superman (2008) – Part of the "Thy Kingdom Come" storyline, and not an actual Elseworlds, it fills in details about Lois Lane's death at the hands of the Joker as mentioned in Kingdom Come.

== Green Lantern Elseworlds ==
- Green Lantern: Evil's Might (2002) – Featuring Green Lantern, the story is set in New York City around 1888.
- Green Lantern: 1001 Emerald Nights (2001) – A Green Lantern story in a classical Arabic setting.

== Teen Titans Elseworlds ==
- Teen Titans: The Lost Annual (2008) – The original Teen Titans go into space to save John F. Kennedy. It was originally planned for release in 2003 as the Teen Titans Swingin' Elseworlds Special, but its release was cancelled even though the book was finished. DC Comics released the book in January 2008 as a "Lost Annual".
- Titans: Scissors, Paper, Stone (1997) – A futuristic manga-style Teen Titans tale. The story was originally intended as the Titans' installment of the 1996 Legends of the Dead Earth Annuals, but was reworked as a standalone Elseworlds special.

== Wonder Woman Elseworlds ==
- Wonder Woman: Amazonia (1997) – A Victorian era Wonder Woman battles Jack the Ripper and the society that created him.
- Wonder Woman: The Blue Amazon (2003) – Sequel to Superman's Metropolis and Batman: Nosferatu, which combines the Wonder Woman mythos with the films The Blue Angel and Dr. Mabuse the Gambler.

== Elseworlds Annuals (1994) ==
The DC Annuals in 1994 featured Elseworlds stories.

- Action Comics Annual #6 – "Legacy" – A Kryptonian named Gar-El flees Krypton and conquers 18th-century Earth. 200 years later, his descendant Kal fights against his rule. This story is written and drawn by John Byrne.
  - "Doomsday for the Fifth Dimension": A short story which was published alongside "Legacy". Written by Dennis Janke and Louise Simonson, and illustrated by Janke, the story shows baby Kal-El's rocketship landing not on Earth, but in the Fifth Dimension, and having grown to adult size, begins unintentionally wreaking havoc on its denizens until he is stopped by King Mxyzptlk.
- Adventures of Superman Annual #6 – "The Super Seven Part I: The Longest Night" – Long after Earth has been conquered by aliens, only seven superheroes remain.
- Batman Annual #18 – "Black Masterpiece" – Leonardo da Vinci's apprentice uses his master's hang-glider design to fight crime.
- Batman: Legends of the Dark Knight Annual #4 – "Citizen Wayne" – Batman as Citizen Kane.
- Batman: Shadow of the Bat Annual #2 – "The Tyrant" – In a totalitarian Gotham, Batman prevents crime by suppressing all dissent, while Anarky leads the resistance.
- Catwoman Annual #1 – "The Last Man" – Talia al Ghul as a 14th-century werecat fighting Crusaders.
- Deathstroke the Terminator Annual #3 – "Journey's End" – Deathstroke survives in a post-apocalyptic world.
- Detective Comics Annual #7 – "Leatherwing" – Batman translated into a traditional tale of piracy on the high seas (a sequel was published in The Batman Chronicles #11 (winter 1998) and called "The Bride of Leatherwing").
- Flash Annual #7 – "The Barry Allen Story" – A crippled Wally West sells Barry Allen's story to a film studio.
- Green Lantern Annual #3 – "Ring of Evil" – Hal Jordan and Guy Gardner as Nazis, with John Stewart leading the resistance.
- Justice League America Annual #8 – "The Once and Future League" – A century after the League was destroyed by Felix Faust, a new version is formed.
- Justice League International Annual #5 – "No Rules to Follow" – On an alternate Earth where metahumans are shunned and feared, several of them come together as the Justice League.
- L.E.G.I.O.N. Annual #5 – "The Man From L.E.G.I.O.N. 007" – Lobo as a James Bond parody and other spoofs: "L.E.G.I.O.N. Archives", "L.E.G.I.O.N. 90210", "L.E.G.I.O.N. by Gaslight", "WomanMan with Girl the Boy Wonder", "Elseworlds Rejects".
- Legionnaires Annual #1 – "Castles in the Air" – The Legion as a futuristic version of the Knights of the Round Table.
- Legion of Super-Heroes Annual #5 – "The Long Road Home" – The Legion in The Wonderful Wizard of Oz.
- Lobo Annual #2 – "A Fistful of Bastiches" – Assorted Western tales.
- New Titans Annual #10 – "Facets" – Heroic fantasy version of the battle against Trigon.
- Robin Annual #3 – "The Narrow Path" – In feudal Japan, the apprentice of the Bat-Ninja learns his true destiny.
- Steel Annual #1 – "Crucible of Freedom" – John Henry Irons as a plantation slave who fights for his family's freedom before the American Civil War.
- Superboy Annual #1 – "The Super Seven Part II: The Men of Steel" – Continuing the story from Adventures of Superman Annual #6.
- Superman Annual #6 – "The Feral Man of Steel" – In 19th-century India, Kal-El is raised by wolves. The story is loosely based on Rudyard Kipling's Mowgli stories, with added elements of Tarzan.
- Superman: The Man of Steel Annual #3 – "Unforgiven" – Jor-El convinces the Science Council to relocate selected Kryptonians to Earth. 20 years later, his son must help humans and Kryptonians live in harmony.
- Team Titans Annual #2 – "Into the Light" – A space opera version of the battle against Lord Chaos.

=== Collected editions ===
- Superman/Batman: Alternate Histories (1996) – reprints the stories "Leatherwing", "Legacy", "Crucible of Freedom" and "Citizen Wayne".

== Collected editions ==
Title	Material collected	Publication date	ISBN
Elseworlds: Batman Volume One	Batman: Holy Terror, Batman: The Blue, the Grey, and the Bat, Robin 3000 #1–2, Batman/Dark Joker: The Wild, Batman/Houdini: The Devil's Workshop, Batman: Castle of the Bat, Batman: In Darkest Knight, Batman: Dark Allegiances	April 26, 2016	9781401260743
Elseworlds: Justice League Volume One	Elseworld's Finest #1–2, Elseworld's Finest: Supergirl & Batgirl, Justice Riders, League of Justice #1–2, Titans: Scissors, Paper, Stone, Wonder Woman: Amazonia	July 19, 2016	9781401263775
Elseworlds: Batman Volume Two	Batman & Dracula: Red Rain, Batman: Bloodstorm, Batman: Crimson Mist	October 11, 2016	9781401269821
Elseworlds: Justice League Volume Two	JLA: Act of God #1–3, Elseworlds 80-Page Giant #1, Superman's Metropolis, Batman: Nosferatu, Wonder Woman: The Blue Amazon	July 25, 2017	9781401268558
Elseworlds: Superman Volume One	Superman: Speeding Bullets, Superman: Kal, Superman: Distant Fires, Superman: A Nation Divided, Superman, Inc., Superman: War of the Worlds	February 13, 2018	9781401271183
Elseworlds: Batman Volume Three	Batman: KnightGallery, Batman: Brotherhood of the Bat, Batman: Dark Knight of the Round Table #1-2, Batman: Scar of the Bat, Batman: Masque	June 19, 2018	9781401265960
Elseworlds: Superman Volume Two	Son of Superman, Superboy's Legion #1–2, Superman: True Brit, Supergirl: Wings	April 16, 2019	9781401288938
Elseworlds: Justice League Volume Three	Conjurors #1–3, Flashpoint #1–3, Superman and Batman: World's Funnest, JLA: Created Equal #1–2, Green Lantern: 1001 Emerald Nights	February 26, 2019	9781401287917

== See also ==
- Just Imagine...
- Tangent Comics
- What If...? (Marvel)
