= Wonder Woman: Amazonia =

1997 one-shot comic book by William Messner-Loebs

Cover to Wonder Woman: Amazonia (1997), art by Phil Winslade

Wonder Woman: Amazonia is a 1997 one-shot comic book, written by William Messner-Loebs, illustrated by Phil Winslade, and published by DC Comics under its Elseworlds imprint. As with all Elseworlds it tells a non-canon story of a DC hero, this time Wonder Woman, outside regular continuity. The story is set between 1888 and 1928 in an alternate history with steampunk overtones, previously considered "Earth-34" in the post-Infinite Crisis DC multiverse, now considered "Earth-19" in The New 52 (post-Flashpoint) universe.

== Plot ==
The story takes place in a world which diverged from ours in 1888, when a mysterious explosion killed Queen Victoria and her entire immediate family, with the exception of Duke "Eddy" of Clarence, who survived as a brain damaged cripple and was thus unable to succeed to the throne. A mysterious American named Jack Planters then appeared with a claim to be a distant royal cousin named "John Charles Plantagenet", and was crowned King John II, popularly known as King Jack. Little does anyone suspect that Planters himself murdered the Royal Family after having dispatched four Whitechapel prostitutes for practice (Mary Jane Kelly is spared in this timeline, and makes a cameo as an old woman). Under King Jack's rule the British Empire becomes steadily both more militaristic, unjustly making war on France and other countries, and misogynistic, suspending all women's rights and establishing a harsh patriarchy.

Diana the Amazon is snatched away from Paradise Island by an invading Royal Marines squadron captained by Steven Trevor, here a wicked villain in contrast to the selfless hero that he is in the mainstream DC Universe. Trevor takes Diana back to London as his wife, and "civilizes" her. By 1928, Diana is an actress and the leading player of a London theatre show which acts out Bible stories. She eventually runs away and adopts the heroic persona of Wonder Woman, organizing resistance against King Jack's cruel regime. Along the way, Wonder Woman learns that the King's son, Prince Charles, is as kindhearted and just as his father is murderous and tyrannical. Charles becomes Diana's partner in both war and love, leading to the story ending in an inevitable pun.

== Publication ==
- Wonder Woman: Amazonia (by William Messner-Loebs, Paul Kupperberg and Phil Winslade, DC Comics, 1997, ISBN 0-606-22070-4)

== See also ==
- List of Elseworlds publications

Other Elseworlds that involve Jack the Ripper:

- Gotham by Gaslight
- JLA: The Island of Dr. Moreau
- Batman: Two Faces

Other comic books presenting a mythologized version of Jack the Ripper:

- From Hell
