= Superman: At Earth's End =

1995 DC Comics book

- Cover to Superman: At Earth's End, art by Frank Gomez

Publication information
- Publisher: DC Comics
- Format: One-shot
- Genre: Superhero
- Publication date: 1995
- No. of issues: 1
- Main character(s): Superman; Adolf Hitler

Creative team
- Written by: Tom Veitch
- Artist: Frank Gomez

Superman: At Earth's End is a 1995 comic book Elseworlds story, published by DC Comics. Written by Tom Veitch with art by Frank Gomez, the story set in a post-apocalyptic future, where mutations run wild, and a white-maned Man of Steel has begun a fight against new scourge sweeping across the Earth—a nightmare army of bat-men. The book is, more or less, the sequel to the miniseries Kamandi: At Earth's End, which itself was a reimagining of the DC comic series Kamandi, created by Jack Kirby in 1972.

== Plot ==
After the world-altering events of Kamandi: At Earth's End, a period of cleansing is taking place. A group of emotionless, logical cyborgs named the Biomech Sevens are overseeing Earth's return to greatness. For the last year, Superman has been regaining his lost strength in a hovering city, where he is able to receive the benefits of the sun's rays. While recuperating, he learns that Gotham City is next in line to be "cleansed", via a nuclear bomb. It has been overrun with mutants and other such degenerates.

After battling the Biomech Sevens' leader Ben Boxer, Superman goes down to Gotham to stop this cleansing process. Although the Batman of this Elseworld is long since dead, Superman is attacked by bat-like mutants that bear a striking resemblance to the Dark Knight, as his strength has been sapped, even though it claimed he had been restored to full strength. He is saved by a cadre of mohawked youth traveling in a pack of motorcycles, who shoot the monsters. Following them back to their hideout, which turns out to be Wayne Manor, Superman is horrified to find out Batman's corpse was stolen from its crypt by a mysterious group called "the DNA Diktators" who also kidnapped the children's parents, who are being held in an underground fortress beneath the city. They get into the Batcave and walk on for at least 30 miles.

When Superman breaks into the underground fortress, he discovers that their parents have been altered into mutated, mindless creatures. These unfortunates are being accosted by giant "Harvester" robots, serving the wishes of the Diktators. Superman fights off the robots with what remains of his strength and retreats back to the Batcave with the children. As he prepares to storm the DNA Diktators' fortress, one of the children suggests he use the "Expunger", an oversized gun which Batman recovered on his last case. Superman refuses because guns are against his principles, and they set off. After encountering the Diktators' army of mutated lionmen, Superman is shocked to find out who the leaders of the Diktators really are: twin clones of Adolf Hitler, who killed their creators.

Too weak to go on, Superman once again retreats with the child gang. Faced with no other option, Superman takes the Expunger with him and returns, defeating the Diktators' legions of lion-men and mutant SS troopers in a hail of gunfire. The Hitlers retreat to their inner sanctum and reveal a huge mutated Batman-creature. Superman at first believes it to be a resurrected Bruce Wayne, as it possessed all of his memories, but quickly realizes the monster does not breathe, nor does it have a pulse. Using what little strength he has left, Superman kills the monster with a single punch, only to fall prey to the Hitlers' machine guns. In his weakened state, the bullets inflict mortal wounds. With his last ounce of strength, Superman picks up the Expunger and, blaming the real Hitler for starting the arms race, he opens fire, killing them both.

Superman walks away triumphant, though mortally wounded. Bleeding to death, Superman carries the remains of his friend back to Wayne Manor where he builds a bonfire to make sure Batman's remains are never misused again. A recalcitrant Ben Boxer offers to make the Man of Steel into a cyborg like himself. Faced with immortality in a world that is no longer his own, Superman turns down the offer, scoops up the remains of his friend and walks into his own funeral pyre. As he burns alive, one child gang member throws his gun into the fire, saying that if it wasn't for guns, Superman would still be alive.

== Publication ==
- Superman: At Earth's End (52 page, September 1995)

== See also ==
- List of Elseworlds publications
