= Batman: KnightGallery =

1995 American comic book

Cover of Batman: KnightGallery (January 1996)

Batman: KnightGallery is an American comic book published in 1995 by the DC Comics imprint Elseworlds. It was written by Doug Moench, and features the art of Thomas Grummett, Michael Manley, Vincent Giarrano, James Balent, Bret Blevins, Graham Nolan, Norm Breyfogle, Neal Adams, George Pérez, Stephen De Stefano, Tom Lyle, Gary Frank, David Taylor and Nigel Phelps.

The comic book's background is about a team of top archeologists discovering the Batcave decades after Batman's last appearance. Presented inside the book are various designs which were created by Bruce Wayne himself.

== Bruce Wayne's suggested designs ==
=== Batman ===
Batman's designs ranged widely in the pages that are included; some modifications that were speculated included: chin guards with built-in radio and microphone, earphones built into the cowl, pouches and compartments on the boots, gauntlets and belt; wing-like capes with shoulder protrusions (which could have obstructed vision and gotten snagged in tight spaces); capes that were perfect simulations of bat wings (but would prove too heavy), variation in the length of the ears, colors and designs that looked too "fancy", too "gimmicky", too "mysterioso" (this one was entirely red), too "weird" and too "demonic".

=== Robin ===
Maximum protection is key for the Robin designs; Batman did not wish for Tim Drake to be vulnerable.

Some notes on the designs included: bare legs as unacceptable, the cape as bird wings, change from traditional Robin colors to black and yellow, a staff that would double as a blowgun, headbands (to emphasize the martial arts portion of the training) a bandanna, throwing darts (too much bloodshed) wings, absence of a cape, hoods and a design emulating Robin Hood. Many of these were deemed too childish.

=== The Batmobile ===
According to Batman, The Batmobile needed: a week's water and rations in the trunk, a lightweight and bulletproof body, swift acceleration, agility on all surfaces, at least two auxiliary fuel tanks, Unibody construction, advanced strut suspension, anti-lock double-disc brakes, crash protection with airbags for passenger and driver, seat ejection, concealed floodlights, motion- and heat-sensing alarms, remote self-destruction capability, backup anti-theft wheel-locks, forward and rear cameras, police radio, loudspeaker, conventional radio and television and heavy-duty tires (both puncture-proof and flameproof).

=== Wayne Manor ===
Wayne Manor was to be mostly unchanged, except for advanced alarm systems for the perimeter, ground, threshold and interior space, and a secret entrance hidden by either a large painting or the grandfather clock.

=== The Batcave ===
The Batcave would serve as a garage for the cars; have a concealed exit far from the cave, a state-of-the-art crime lab and communications center; a trophy room, which would serve as a constant reminder of what Batman's mission is all about; and it would also have maximum speed and data storage for the computers.

=== Others ===
Batman also noted some of the designs of the new Arkham Asylum and how easy it would be to escape from it, as well as the general mood of Gotham City.

== See also ==
- List of Elseworlds publications
