= Batman/Houdini: The Devil's Workshop =

1993 comic book one-shot

- Cover of Batman/Houdini: The Devil's Workshop one-shot, art by Mark Chiarello

Publication information
- Publisher: Elseworlds (DC Comics)
- Format: One-shot
- Genre: Superhero
- No. of issues: 1
- Main character(s): Batman; Houdini

Creative team
- Written by: Howard Chaykin; John Francis Moore
- Artist: Mark Chiarello
- Letterer: Ken Bruzenak
- Colorist: Mark Chiarello
- Editor: Dennis O'Neil

Collected editions
- Batman/Houdini: The Devil's Workshop: ISBN 1-56389-113-1

Batman/Houdini: The Devil's Workshop is a 1993 Elseworlds one-shot, written by Howard Chaykin and John Francis Moore. Containing full-painted art by Mark Chiarello, the story recounts a fictional encounter between the superhero Batman and famous escape artist Harry Houdini in early 20th century Gotham.

== Characters ==
- Bruce Wayne/Batman
- Harry Houdini
- Victoria Vale, a reporter
- Jack Schadenfreude
- Elijah Montenegro, the Beef Baron
- Leonora Reinhardt, an actress and medium
- Tom Mix

== Plot ==
In the Winter of 1907, children are disappearing from the impoverished part of Gotham, known as the "Devil's Workshop". The criminal is a grinning white-faced ghoul named Jack Schadenfreude.

Meanwhile, Harry Houdini is in town for a performance and mingles with Gotham's elite. Amongst them is Bruce Wayne, from an old money background, and Elijah Montenegro, the nouveau riche, self-styled "Beef Baron". Also in town are other notables, specifically Tom Mix and Leonora Reinhardt. All the high society events are being documented for the Gotham Globe by Victoria Vale.

Vale and Wayne attend Reinhardt's performance as the lead in Medea, where they meet the Baron again. They are then invited into a séance held by Reinhardt. An invitation also extended to Houdini, who has an interest in the paranormal. The séance is apparently a success, leading the three to conclude something genuinely supernatural is going on.

The abductions are traced to Montenegro's meat factory and it soon becomes apparent that everything is somehow connected.

The story is narrated by Houdini. He contrasts his own poor upbringing with that of Bruce Wayne. It also highlights Batman, as he learns a number of his skills from studying Houdini's work.

== Publication ==
The story was published as a 64-page, prestige forma one-shot by DC Comics (ISBN 1563891131).

== Awards ==
- 1993: Won "Best Graphic Novel" Don Thompson Award
- 1994:
  - Nominated for "Best Painter" Eisner Award, for Mark Chiarello
  - Nominated for "Best Letterer" Eisner Award, for Ken Bruzenak

== See also ==
- List of Elseworlds publications
