= Green Lantern: Evil's Might =

2002 comic book miniseries

- Cover to Green Lantern: Evil's Might #1

Publication information
- Publisher: DC Comics
- Schedule: Monthly
- Format: Miniseries
- Publication date: August - October 2002
- No. of issues: 3

Creative team
- Written by: Howard Chaykin; David Tischman
- Penciller: Marshall Rogers
- Inker: John Cebollero
- Colorist: Chris Chuckry

Green Lantern: Evil's Might is a three-issue American comic book miniseries published in 2002 by DC Comics in that company's Elseworlds imprint. It is written by Howard Chaykin and David Tischman, and illustrated by Marshall Rogers.

The story takes place in 1888 in New York City, and uses the infamous Boss Tweed as one of the main villains and the Tammany Hall political machine as a plot device.

== Plot summary ==
The story retells Alan Scott's origin, with Kyle Rayner in the role of Scott. Set in New York City in the year 1888, political cartoonist Kyle Rayner, a.k.a. "Rain or Shine", discovers an old green lantern in a pawnshop one day. Inside the lantern is a magical green ring which, when charged, grants Kyle unlimited power. Becoming the Green Lantern, a symbol of hope for the downtrodden immigrant masses of New York, Kyle lashes back against the forces of Boss Tweed and the corrupt Tammany Hall, all the while romancing political suffragist Carol Ferris and dealing with psychopathic hoodlum Alan Scott and Carol's policeman fiancé, Hal Jordan.

== Characters ==
- The Green Lantern: Kyle Rayner is a political cartoonist working under the pen name "Rain or Shine". Formerly an associate with Alan Scott and the Bowery Greens, Kyle broke off his ties with them when Alan killed a seventy-two-year-old shopkeeper named Angus Kelly. Kyle uses the magic ring he found inside the lantern for the benefit of the immigrant masses of New York.
- Carol Ferris: A political suffragist and an independent and kind-hearted woman who seeks to win freedom for women in a world ruled by men. Originally engaged to Hal Jordan, she breaks off the engagement and falls in love with Kyle Rayner.
- Alan Scott: The leader of a gang called the Bowery Greens, Alan has absolutely no regard for human life and would sooner kill his own men just to save his life.
- Hal Jordan: A police inspector who is in love with Carol Ferris, Hal resorted to teaming up with Tammany Hall and the Bowery Greens in order to keep Carol.
- James Mulrooney: An Irishman who leads the mistreated workers in a revolt in the final volume.
- Jimmy Mulrooney: The son of James Mulrooney and a friend to Kyle Rayner, Jimmy left the Bowery Greens when Kyle did.
- Ed Ferris: Big Ed Ferris enjoys his wealth and his status. He is willing to sell off his daughter to the highest bidder so long as it gets him respectability.
- Boss Tweed: The corrupt head of Tammany Hall.
- William A. Carson: The editor of the New York Evening Graphic.
- Angus Kelly: Angus is the owner of a secondhand shop who is forced to pay the Bowery Greens ten dollars a week. He gave Kyle the old green lantern. He has his throat slit by Alan Scott.
- The Little People: As explained by Martin, the ring was originally a piece of the magical Blarney Stone, cleaved off by the Leprechaun King and given as a gift to King Harold of Ireland. They then melted down his sword and had it turned into a lantern.

== See also ==
- List of Elseworlds publications
