= JLA: Act of God =

Comic book series published in 2000

Publication information
- Publisher: Elseworlds (DC Comics)
- Schedule: Monthly
- Format: Limited series
- Genre: Superhero
- Publication date: January – March 2001
- No. of issues: 3

Creative team
- Written by: Doug Moench
- Artist: Dave Ross
- Editor(s): Andy Helfer; Harvey Richards

JLA: Act of God is a three issue limited series published by DC Comics under the Elseworlds banner in 2000. It is written by Doug Moench and illustrated by Dave Ross.

The story is a psychological look at what could happen to many superheroes if their powers were taken away by an unseen natural event, and has them pondering whether it is right for them to have powers in the first place.

== Plot ==
On May 23, 2000, an event called the "Black Light" causes all technology on Earth to stop working for a split second and permanently robs every superpowered being on the planet of their powers. Heroes such as the Flash, Green Lantern, and Superman are haunted by their fall from grace. J'onn J'onzz, the Martian Manhunter, questions whether some individuals should have special powers, and believes the Black Light event happened to teach superheroes that just because they save lives does not mean they need powers to do so. Other depowered heroes, such as Rex Mason, formerly Metamorpho, see this as a turn for the better now that they are human again. Heroes who never had to rely on superpowers, such as Batman, and heroes who use technology such as Steel, Booster Gold, and Blue Beetle, are forced to pick up the slack when criminal activity spikes.

Things are not going well for some of the retired heroes. Clark agrees to split with Lois Lane who is upset at him being a self-loathing drunk, and he later moves in with Diana Prince, formerly Wonder Woman. Green Lantern becomes obsessed with finding a way to defeat Sonar, and Linda Danvers, formerly Supergirl, finds working as a cop insufficient to bring justice to criminals.

Nearly a year after the Black Light event, Supergirl, at a meeting with Aquaman, Martian Manhunter, and the Flash, brings up the idea of still being heroes despite losing their superpowers. She dubs the former superheroes the Phoenix Group because they plan to rise from the ashes like the mythical phoenix. The four of them begin training with Batman and other non-super heroes. Flash leaves for a while and goes to the Flash Museum, but comes back when he learns that people are forgetting what the heroes meant.

At Zen-Gen Biotech Systems Inc., Ray Palmer, formerly the Atom, signs up for an experiment to regain his ability to shrink, despite the fact that his powers came from a belt. The scientists manage to grant Ray the ability to shrink, but he becomes stuck at six inches tall. Ray learns the scientists are employed by Lex Luthor and sell superpowers to anyone who can pay. Ray begins shrinking to the subatomic level and returns to his normal size too fast, causing a miniature atomic blast that kills him. Needing more test subjects, Luthor has a group of villains, led by the Joker, kidnap Metamorpho, Booster Gold, and Blue Beetle.

Meanwhile, the Phoenix Group finishes their training and reveal their new identities. Supergirl is now Justice, Aquaman is now the Hand, Flash is now Red Devil, and Martian Manhunter is now the Green Man. They begin investigating Ray Palmer's death.

Clark leaves Diana when she starts to believe that all that has happened is merely a test from God and that her powers will return when it ends. Clark winds up living on the street, but receives money in a homeless shelter from a priest. He sees firefighters rescue someone from a burning building, then moves to a secluded home in the woods.

The Phoenix Group and Batman, with help from Oracle, discover the truth behind Atom's death when Justice finds his message on the dollhouse table. They then learn of the abductions of Metamorpho, Booster Gold, and Blue Beetle. The Group, along with Nightwing, head for S.T.A.R. Labs, where the Zen-Gen scientists are working. They find the kidnapped heroes and get into a battle with the tech villains. The Group is victorious in its debut, and the villains are arrested along with Lex Luthor.

Kyle Rayner faces off against Sonar one last time and soundly defeats the villain, but dies when Sonar impales him. Clark goes back to Diana and stops her from killing herself. The two marry and Clark returns to his job at the Daily Planet. Two years later, Clark and Diana have a healthy baby boy who, unbeknown to the two of them, has the ability to transmute matter.

== Reception ==
Reviewers have heavily criticized the irrational characters and severe idiot plot tendencies. The destruction of Clark Kent and Lois Lane's relationship was heavily questioned, as was the abandonment of both Superman and Wonder Woman's heroics and ideals. The book has also been criticized for elements that seem to glorify Batman and his methods to the detriment of other heroes, particularly the sequence where several depowered heroes go to him for guidance to be heroes again. Doug Moench's knowledge on the DC Universe and its characters has also been called into question.

== See also ==
- JLA: Created Equal, a similar Elseworlds tale involving a cataclysmic event that strikes Earth.
- Decimation, a Marvel Comics event involving the mass depowering of mutants.
- List of Elseworlds publications
