= Superman: War of the Worlds =

1998 DC Comics graphic novel

- Cover to Superman War of the Worlds, art by Michael Lark

Publication information
- Publisher: DC Comics
- Format: One-shot
- Genre: Superhero
- Publication date: 1998
- No. of issues: 1
- Main character(s): Clark Kent; Lois Lane; Lex Luthor

Creative team
- Written by: Roy Thomas
- Artist: Michael Lark
- Letterer: Willie Schubert
- Colorist: Noelle Giddings

Superman: War of the Worlds is a DC Comics Elseworlds graphic novel, published in 1998, written by Roy Thomas with Michael Lark as the artist. The story is a rough adaptation of the H. G. Wells 1898 novel The War of the Worlds, but is primarily based on the Superman mythology. Wells' story is transported from early 20th century Britain to Metropolis in 1938, where the Martian invasion is met with a Golden Age-style Superman who is not blessed with the full range of powers that he typically has in modern comics.

== Characters ==
Most of the characters in the story are based on the cast from The War of the Worlds and DC Comics characters.

Main characters

- Superman/Clark Kent: After crashing on Earth and being adopted by Jonathan and Martha Kent, Clark was told that he should hide his powers. He was told that humanity would fear him, but when the time is right, he would use his powers for the good of mankind. As Superman, he battles the Martian invaders.
- Lois Lane: Lois is a reporter at the Daily Star.
- Dr. Lex Luthor: a brilliant American scientist with a full head of red hair.
- The Martians: invaders from the Red Planet bent on conquering Earth.

Supporting characters

- Perry White: Lead reporter of the Daily Star.
- George "Chief" Taylor: Editor-in-Chief of the Daily Star, who witnesses the tripod's attack on Metropolis and is killed by one.
- Jimmy Olsen: Red-haired employee of the Daily Star, who survives the Martians' attack on the Daily Star.
- Professor Ogilvy: The astronomer from H.G. Wells' book, who documents the explosions on Mars' surface and is a witness to the first sighting of the Martians.

== Plot ==
Earth is being watched by the envious eyes of Mars. On the red planet a cold and unsympathetic civilization plans to invade the Earth. Far away, an even older world, Krypton, sends its last son to Earth. The baby Kal-El is found by the Kents and develops super strength, the ability to run faster than a railway engine, leap an eighth of a mile and has near-impenetrable skin. After the death of his elderly foster parents, Clark vows to use his powers to benefit mankind.

In 1938, explosions are seen on Mars, but Earth doesn't pay much attention to them. Clark applies for a job at the Daily Star, where he meets Lois Lane. Perry White sends Clark and Lois to report on a meteor, which has crashed the previous night. They arrive just in time to see Professor Ogilvy and Doctor Luthor investigating the meteor, which is in fact a giant metal cylinder. The lid unscrews and the crowd around the cylinder cries in horror as they see a Martian emerge. Professor Ogilvy waves a white flag in hopes of communicating with the Martians, but is incinerated by one of their weapons. The crowd starts to panic as more shots are fired. When Clark protects Lois from the rays, his civilian clothes are burned off revealing Superman's costume underneath.

The Army arrives and prepares to deal with the cylinder when it opens and tripods emerge. The five tripods start firing at the army, whose weapons are useless against the metal hulls. Superman picks up a cannon and beats a tripod with it. As he finishes off the Martian inside, the four remaining tripods walk to Metropolis. Lois meets up with Lex and they retreat to Lex's laboratory. Earth's forces are being massacred until Superman joins the fight in Metropolis. Superman fights the tripods as best he can, but is subdued by another alien weapon, the black smoke. The tripods capture Lois, blast Clark with their heat ray and imprison him.

Three weeks later, Superman is held captive by the Martians, who are being helped by a now-bald Luthor after a Heat-Ray burned off all of his hair. All of Earth's major cities have been conquered and many humans have been reduced to slaves or cattle. Many world leaders, including Franklin D. Roosevelt, Adolf Hitler, Joseph Stalin, King George VI and his family, and most of the Imperial Japanese government, were killed in the attack. Luthor reveals that Earth's bacteria have been making many Martians sick, and that they are studying Clark, who he deduces is in fact an alien like them. At Luthor's request, Lois has been kept alive, mostly to keep Superman in check. Lex deduces that Clark's Kryptonian biology is canceling the deadly effects of Earth's bacteria, which is why the Martians around him are not sick.

The Martians now no longer need Luthor to help them study Superman and they prepare to devour him. Lois and Luthor free Clark and he starts fighting the Martians. After leveling the ones inside the ship and the ones tending to their human prisoners, Lois recoils from Superman, telling him that she can't bear to have an alien touch her after what the Martians have done. Tripods arrive and Superman takes them down as best he can. The last tripod discards its legs and begins to fly. As Superman finally takes it down, he dies from exhaustion and from the wounds he received from the Heat-Rays.

Acting on Clark's insight, Luthor (having redeemed himself after his bout of treason) quickly finds a way to destroy the remaining Martians. Earth's nations begin their road to recovery. Germany, Japan, Italy, and the former Soviet Union elect semi-democratic governments, while Great Britain (which has no surviving royal family members) turns to fascism and chooses Oswald Mosley as its Leader. Lex Luthor and Lois Lane later marry. John Nance Garner becomes President and Lex becomes the new Vice President. A statue of Clark Kent is erected in front of the revived League of Nations as a testament to his bravery.

== Publication ==
- Superman: War of the Worlds (68 pages, 1998, ISBN 1-56389-396-7)

== Trivia ==
- The Daily Planet newspaper, where Clark Kent and Lois Lane work, was originally named the Daily Star.
- Superman co-creator Joe Shuster named the fictional newspaper Daily Star, after the real newspaper Toronto Star. Shuster had been a newsboy when the Toronto Star was still called the Daily Star.

== See also ==
- List of Elseworlds publications
