= Batman: Castle of the Bat =

1994 comic book

Cover to Batman: Castle of the Bat, art by Bo Hampton

Batman: Castle of the Bat is a DC Comics Elseworlds special published in 1994, written by Jack C. Harris with art by Bo Hampton as the artist and Tracy Hampton-Munsey as the letterer.

In 1819, a troubled Bruce Wayne revives his father from the dead. The story is loosely based on Mary Shelley's novel Frankenstein and the classic black-and-white film Frankenstein featuring Boris Karloff.

== Characters ==
Familiar characters from the Batman mythos as well as some characters based on Shelley's novel are adapted to fit this Elseworlds story:

- Bruce Wayne: Orphaned after his parents are killed in a highway robbery, Bruce becomes a doctor, as his father asked him to do before he died. He soon becomes obsessed with death, rebirth, and the transfer of physical traits from one living being to another.
- Alfred Pennyworth: Alfredo is Bruce Wayne's butler, a hunchback who serves as his assistant and servant.
- Thomas Wayne: Bruce's father, a highly reputed doctor who believed there was no nobler profession. He is murdered by a highway robber, and is later reanimated by Bruce, becoming the Bat-Man. His appearance is a homage to the Frankenstein Monster in the 1931 film.
- Joe Chill: The Robber/Mr. Van Klooster: A murdering lackey that kills Thomas and Martha Wayne, he wears a costume reminiscent of the Scarecrow.
- Doctor Seltsam: A doctor at the university, he wonders what Bruce's secret experiments consist of. He is also responsible for developing a liquid capable of preserving dead tissue for over 15 years.
- The Bat-Hound: Bruce creates a part-dog, part-bat animal that is excellent at tracking at night.
- Fräulein (Julia) Lavenza: Bruce Wayne's fiancée, based on Elizabeth from Shelley's novel (although the name may be intended to reference Julie Madison, one of Bruce Wayne's oldest love interests).
- Commissioner Jim Gordon: Bürgermeister Gordon is a clever chief of police, who suspects something is amiss when a highway robber calls Bruce Wayne's fiancée by her name.

== Plot ==
One night, a masked robber murders Bruce Wayne's parents. Vowing revenge, Bruce studies hard, follows his father's footsteps and becomes a doctor. Even though he continues studying, he still presses his first promise to himself that he will avenge his parents. He spends hours locked up in his laboratory, and as his experiments continue to augment in cost and secrecy, he is warned that he will be evicted from the university. Bruce suddenly learns about Fraülein (Julia) Lavenza's unscheduled visit. Fearing that she will be attacked like his parents were, he suddenly rescues her from the same man that killed his parents. Bruce viciously beats the robber and is ready to kill him, but Julia makes him let the man go. The couple go to Bürgermeister Gordon to report the would-be robbery. Gordon immediately suspects something is amiss when it is revealed that the highwayman called the Fraülein by her name. While the police investigate, Bruce unveils to Dr. Seltsam that he has purchased a castle where he will continue his research. Seltsam ponders at what Bruce is doing unsupervised by the university. Bruce invites him to come see for himself.

That night, Bruce unveils to Dr. Seltsam his 'bat-hound', a dog which has been infused with the energies that give a bat nighttime tracking abilities. Seeing this abomination, Seltsam warns Bruce that he is treading on dangerous ground and that he should stop immediately. Bruce explains to him that he has discovered that the electricity that flows in the human body, and that in fact any animal has unique properties and varies like the different attributes of every animal themselves. He says that once captured and isolated, these energies can be transferred to other living organisms. He explains how these could be used to improve and heal mankind, and that if these energies could be restored after death, it might be possible to bring someone back to life. Seltsam runs off, condemning Bruce's 'black magic'.

Bruce is about to give up his research when Alfredo falls through the floor into a tunnel. Following it, Bruce and his servant find the vaults under the university that contain all the body parts used to study biology. Alfredo discovers that some of the pieces date from very long ago, which Bruce at first believes impossible because science has no way of preserving human tissue for that long. Looking through the rows of jars, he finds his father's brain, donated to the university and perfectly preserved for 15 years. Bruce steals the brain and hoping that there is some energy left in it, prepares to construct a new body for his father, one that will be great in size and strength.

With a new course to pursue, Wayne convinces Dr. Seltsam that he has abandoned his research. Alfredo and Bruce construct a new body for Thomas Wayne and revive it using electricity. Bruce is disappointed when the creature acts strangely, as it is afraid of the dark, but light bothers it. The doctor decides to destroy it after he is reconciled with Dr. Seltsam and Julia. He promises to take his fiancée to dinner and later meets with Dr. Seltsam, who tells him about how he has noticed that Thomas Wayne's brain has gone missing. Bruce suddenly comes to the realization that his father experienced tremendous stress when he died, and that to restore him, he has to compensate. He rushes to the castle, ready to continue his research.

Bruce clothes the creature in a costume, which mask the scars and will supposedly help in recovering the memories. He injects it with a serum that will give it some attributes of a bat. It becomes aware of itself, sees its hideous face and breaks out of the laboratory, escaping in the night. Weeks pass, as the Bat-Man roams the roads and attacks burglars or criminals, and Bruce's attempts to find it are fruitless. One night though, using the Bat-Hound to track the Bat-Man, they find him attacking the robber who killed Bruce's parents. Bruce stops it from killing the criminal. Before running away, the robber reveals that he was hired by someone. Bruce sends Alfredo to investigate, while he returns the Bat-Man to the castle. Before falling asleep, Bruce mumbles about Julia, about where she is staying.

The Bat-Man is changing, becoming more bat-like in appearance as time passes. He kidnaps Julia from her home and runs off with her. Bruce learns of this and starts the chase. Hot on the Bat-Man's trail, Bruce stumbles upon Dr. Seltsam's lab. The Doctor has captured the Bat-Hound, and has both Alfredo and the robber strapped to machinery in his lab. Seltsam tells the robber that he is no longer useful and that he is going to kill him. As the machinery does its work, Bruce intervenes but it is too late for the robber. Seltsam reveals that the miracle preserving liquid is mainly composed of brain liquid and that the highway robbers were all his henchmen. Seltsam explains that Bruce's father was against his methods of progress through murder and that is why he had to be killed. Seltsam activates the self-destruct sequence in his lab. The Bat-Man barges in the lab, lets Julia go and attacks Seltsam. As the lab crumbles, Seltsam accidentally electrocutes himself and dies. The Bat-Man holds up the roof of the crumbling building, letting the others escape. It calls Bruce 'son' before the lab explodes and kills it. Alfredo theorizes that the Bat-Man kidnapped Julia so Bruce would follow him to Seltsam's lab. As a mob arrives to the burning ruins, Bruce explains to them how Seltsam was destroyed because of the Bat-Man.

== 1931 Frankenstein film ==
Several themes and images are taken from the film starring Boris Karloff as the monster:

- Doctor Grüber's coachman is named Fritz, which is the name of the hunchback in the film.
- Bruce Wayne's assistant is a hunchback, much like Fritz in the original 1931 film.
- Bruce Wayne purchases Mad Ludwig's old castle where he can conduct his experiments undisturbed, much like in the 1931 Frankenstein film. Some of the equipment and machinery in Bruce's laboratory strongly resemble some of the classic state-of-the art special effects from the film.
- Bruce and Alfredo bring the Bat-Man's body to life by having lightning run through it, and when Alfredo sees it moving, he exclaims He lives! Master! He lives! a tribute to some well-known lines by Colin Clive.
- When the newly-revived Thomas Wayne does not act like his normal self, Bruce accuses Alfredo of giving him the wrong brain, like Fritz did in the Frankenstein film.
- A mob carrying torches and pitchforks are seen in the novel, a recurring image in many Frankenstein films.

== See also ==
- The Superman Monster, another Elseworlds take on Frankenstein, this time revolving around Superman
- List of Elseworlds publications
- Frankenstein in popular culture
