= Gotham by Gaslight =

Graphic novel featuring Batman

- Cover to Gotham by Gaslight (February 1989) by Mike Mignola

Publication information
- Publisher: DC Comics
- Format: One-shot
- Genre: Steampunk, superhero
- Publication date: February 1989
- No. of issues: 1
- Main character(s): Batman; Jack the Ripper

Creative team
- Written by: Brian Augustyn
- Artist: Mike Mignola
- Inker: P. Craig Russell
- Colorist: David Hornung
- Editor: Mark Waid

Collected editions
- Gotham by Gaslight: ISBN 0-930289-67-6
- Gotham by Gaslight (inc. Batman: Master of the Future): ISBN 1-4012-1153-4

Gotham by Gaslight: An Alternative History of the Batman is a DC Comics one-shot graphic novel by Brian Augustyn and Mike Mignola, inked by P. Craig Russell, with and an introduction (written in the character of Jack the Ripper) by Robert Bloch. The story revolves around a 19th-century version of Bruce Wayne making his debut as Batman just as Jack the Ripper has arrived in Gotham City.

Gotham by Gaslight is considered to be the first Elseworlds story in which DC Comics characters from alternate timelines or realities are featured in stories outside of the DC Universe canon. At the time the story was first published, the Elseworlds concept had not been established yet and initial printings were not labeled as such. Subsequent printings of Gotham by Gaslight, however, have incorporated the Elseworlds logo. It spawned three sequels, Batman: Master of the Future (1991), also written by Augustyn, with art by Eduardo Barreto, and a third book in the series, Gotham by Gaslight: The Kryptonian Age, which began in June 2024, and Gotham by Gaslight: A League for Justice which began in July 2025.

== Plot summaries ==
=== Gotham by Gaslight: An Alternative History of the Batman ===
In 1889, Bruce Wayne is on a tour of Europe which ends in Vienna. There, he is studying under Dr. Sigmund Freud. Bruce tells Freud that he has a recurring dream in which he recalls the murder of his parents and decides he must return to Gotham City. On the return trip, Bruce meets Jacob Packer, an old family friend whom he calls Uncle Jake, who has also returned from a trip to Europe.

Shortly after arriving, Inspector Gordon informs Wayne about criminal gangs currently operating in Gotham. Gordon also shows Bruce the case of a man who poisoned his wife and tried to commit suicide with the poison, which left him alive with a permanent grin. Bruce takes up the mantle of Batman to fight criminals on the street.

At the same time, a series of murders of women take place and some people begin to suspect that Batman is the murderer. It is soon discovered that Jack the Ripper has come to Gotham, as the murders in Gotham City seem to resemble the Ripper murders in London.

After a search of Wayne Manor, a bloody knife is found under Bruce's bed and Bruce is arrested. A trial is held in which Uncle Jake is Bruce's defense attorney. After the trial, Bruce is convicted of being the Ripper and sentenced to be hanged for his crimes. Bruce is imprisoned in Arkham Asylum.

Once Bruce is in prison, Gordon gives him all the documentation on the crimes. Bruce toils day and night to try to figure out how he can get the Ripper. Just one day before the execution, Bruce learns the Ripper's identity by discovering he had the skill of a surgeon and used a knife that belonged to the medical group who worked with his father. Bruce escapes from prison with the help of Alfred and heads straight for the Ripper.

Batman interrupts the Ripper as he is about to claim his next victim. Batman chases the Ripper throughout Gotham and the two eventually come to a stop at the grave of Thomas and Martha Wayne, where it is revealed that Packer is the Ripper. Packer had been trained in medicine and law with the money of Thomas, but he was driven insane by Martha's rejection of his advances. Since then, he had been killing women who resembled Martha to silence the laughter of Martha he heard in his head.

Packer reveals that he hired an assassin to kill Bruce's parents. Gordon appears at this time with the police and Batman tells them to arrest Packer. Packer confesses that he is the Ripper and tries to kill Batman, but Gordon shoots Packer dead at the last minute. Batman disappears into the shadows, leaving Gordon to take in the body of Jack the Ripper.

=== Batman: Master of the Future ===
In 1892, three years later, Bruce has "retired" his alter-ego and is engaged to be married. Having brought his parents' murderer to justice, he has come to regard Batman as a childish fancy, and intends to devote his life to more serious pursuits. Others believe that Gotham City needs Batman more than ever, namely now-Commissioner Gordon and Bruce's own fiancée, Julie Madison, whom Batman rescued from a late-night assault.

At a City Council meeting, Mayor Tolliver (the former Police Commissioner who aggressively prosecuted Bruce as the suspected Jack the Ripper) is promoting Gotham's hosting of the "American Discovery Exposition" to market Gotham as the "City of the Future". The meeting is interrupted by the flamboyant Alexandre LeRoi, who demands that he be proclaimed master of the city, or else he will burn it to the ground. He leaps out the window before he can be arrested, and Tolliver insists that the fair proceed.

While the fairgrounds are being erected, a Maxim gun on an automated carriage rolls in and opens fire. Bruce, in attendance, pushes Tolliver out of the line of fire and disables the machine.

On the opening day of the fair, LeRoi kidnaps Tolliver from his mansion and takes him aboard a Zeppelin, forcing him to watch as LeRoi focuses a giant burning glass on the fair's main pavilion, before LeRoi throws Tolliver over the side to his death. Bruce is desperate to act, when Alfred arrives with his costume.

With the police fully occupied, Julie runs into the burning pavilion to rescue a small girl, but both of them are trapped by falling debris. Batman saves them, then seizes a glider from one of the exhibitions and takes off after LeRoi's airship. The two men engage in a brutal rapier duel that disables LeRoi's robotic pilot "Antonio", causing the airship to drift off course and become unstable. Noticing this, Batman urges LeRoi to surrender and abandon ship, but LeRoi refuses to believe him. Batman jumps overboard, but LeRoi is trapped as the airship crashes into the ocean and explodes. More than 100 people are killed by LeRoi's fires, but further fatalities and destruction are prevented by the Gotham police and firefighters.

Batman confronts Councilman Franklin Claypool, who confesses to being LeRoi's accomplice and providing him with information for his attack. Claypool secretly owns a large portion of Gotham City's slum housing, which he expected to sell profitably through his proposed redevelopment program, but the program was pushed aside by Tolliver in favor of the fair. LeRoi agreed to target Claypool's properties, allowing Claypool to collect a lucrative insurance payout, but Claypool never intended the deaths that LeRoi's actions caused, and so does not resist when Gordon arrives to arrest him.

Bruce and Julie are walking along a hilltop overlooking the city, when she reveals that she recognized him at the fair, even through his mask. Apprehensively, he asks her what she plans to do, and she replies, what she has always done: continue to love and encourage him, especially now that they both agree that Gotham still needs Batman.

== Publication history ==
Gotham by Gaslight, which retroactively became the first official Elseworlds publication, was initially released as a 52-page one-shot in February 1989. It was written by Brian Augustyn and pencilled by Mike Mignola, with inks by P. Craig Russell. Two years later, the 68-page sequel Batman: Master of the Future — also written by Augustyn, but with art by Eduardo Barreto — was released, this time officially labelled as an Elseworlds publication. A second sequel, Gotham by Gaslight: The Kryptonian Age, was released in June 2024. A third sequel, Gotham by Gaslight: A League for Justice, followed in July 2025.

In 2006, in the wake of the 2005–2006 storyline Infinite Crisis, the Gotham by Gaslight world was identified as "Earth-19".

Prior to its appearance in Countdown Presents: The Search for Ray Palmer: Gotham by Gaslight (January 2008), the two one-shot issues were collected into one 112-page trade paperback volume (which was released under the same name and with the same Mignola cover as the first one-shot issue).

=== Collected editions ===
The two stories have been collected into a trade paperback:

- Gotham by Gaslight, August 2006, DC Comics, ISBN 1-4012-1153-4 (Titan Books, ISBN 1-84576-403-X), collects:
  - Gotham by Gaslight, 48 pages, DC Comics, November 1989, ISBN 0-930289-67-6 (Titan Books, December 1989, ISBN 1-85286-265-3)
  - Batman: Master of the Future, 63 pages, DC Comics, December 1991, ISBN 1-56389-015-1
- Batman: Gotham by Gaslight: DC Compact Comics Edition, January 20, 2026, DC Comics, ISBN 978-1-7995-0665-2 collects:
  - Gotham by Gaslight, 48 pages, DC Comics, November 1989, ISBN 0-930289-67-6 (Titan Books, December 1989, ISBN 1-85286-265-3)
  - Batman: Master of the Future, 63 pages, DC Comics, December 1991, ISBN 1-56389-015-1

== Reception ==
IGN Comics ranked Gotham by Gaslight #12 on a list of the 27 greatest Batman graphic novels, saying that "Gotham By Gaslight is a tightly woven mystery that never tries to do too much. Sometimes Elseworlds tales throw in every bit of Batman lore and the Cray computers to boot. Wisely, Augustyn sticks to what makes sense for the story and pulls off one of the better tales in Batman's long history".

Gotham by Gaslight was not the highest-ranking Elseworlds story on the list, as Batman & Dracula: Red Rain ranked higher at #7.

== Spin-offs ==
Countdown Presents: The Search for Ray Palmer: Gotham by Gaslight (January 2008) and was written by Gotham by Gaslight's original author, Brian Augustyn. The story saw Bob the Monitor accompany Jason Todd, Donna Troy, and Kyle Rayner (the latter three inhabitants of "New Earth") through the Multiverse in search of multiuniversal counterparts to Ray Palmer. The group arrived on Earth-19, the Earth where the Batman of the earlier two Elseworlds storylines acted, where they also encountered this Earth's counterpart of the Blue Beetle and the Man-Bat before they went to the next Earth to continue their search. Their search would take them to worlds populated by characters from other Elseworlds stories, including those seen in the Batman & Dracula trilogy (Earth-43) and Superman: Red Son (Earth-30).

Additionally, the Gotham by Gaslight version of Batman was briefly featured in the limited series Dark Nights: Metal alongside other alternate versions of the character.

== In other media ==
=== Television ===
Batman's outflit from Gotham by Gaslight appears in the Batman: The Brave and the Bold episode "Trials of the Demon!", after Batman is taken to 19th century London, where he teams up with Sherlock Holmes to save Etrigan the Demon, after being framed for a series of crimes committed by Jim Craddock who is stealing souls for Astaroth.

=== Film ===
Batman: Gotham by Gaslight is an animated loose adaptation released in 2018. It features Bruce Greenwood as Batman and Jennifer Carpenter as Selina Kyle. The adaptation differs significantly from the original comic and includes elements from both books.

=== Video games ===
- A video game based on the comic book was planned for release by Day 1 Studios (who also developed F.3.A.R.). After THQ failed to secure the rights to the property, the game was canceled. The developers released some concept illustration which revealed the game had a steampunk feel to it while being set in Victorian England and also test footage was released which revealed the misty Gothic settings and the character model for Batman. Reception to the leaked footage and concept illustration was positive, with viewers praising the setting, the cape physics and the different approach the developers were trying to achieve.
- Season pass holders for Batman: Arkham Origins, released in 2013, were awarded a special costume for Batman that was based on Gotham By Gaslight.
- The Gotham by Gaslight version of Batman was also introduced as a playable character in an update to the mobile version of Injustice: Gods Among Us in early 2018.
- Several Gotham by Gaslight characters were playable in the DC universe-themed MOBA Infinite Crisis.
- Batman’s Gotham By Gaslight suit appears as a playable suit in Lego Batman: Legacy of the Dark Knight.

== See also ==
- List of Elseworlds publications
- List of steampunk works
- From Hell, Alan Moore's Ripper-based graphic novel
- The League of Extraordinary Gentlemen, Moore's Victorian-era tales of derring-do
- Robur the Conqueror, a character created by Jules Verne that LeRoi appears to have been based on

Other Elseworlds that involve Jack the Ripper:

- Batman: Two Faces
- JLA: The Island of Dr. Moreau
- Wonder Woman: Amazonia
