= Whom Gods Destroy (comics) =

1996 comic book mini-series by Chris Claremont

Publication information
- Publisher: Elseworlds (DC Comics)
- Format: Miniseries
- Genre: Superhero
- Publication date: 1996
- No. of issues: 4
- Main character(s): Superman; Lois Lane; Lana Lang

Creative team
- Written by: Chris Claremont
- Penciller: Dusty Abell
- Inker: Drew Geraci
- Letterer: Tom Orzechowski
- Colorist(s): Digital Chameleon; Gloria Vasquez
- Editor: Mike Carlin

Whom Gods Destroy is a 1996 four-issue comic book miniseries, written by Chris Claremont, with artwork by Dusty Abell and Drew Geraci, under the Elseworlds imprint of DC Comics.

In a world where Superman has not aged a day since the Nazis won World War II, Clark Kent infiltrates Axis dominated Europe in pursuit of Lana Lang, who has fallen prey to the enchantress Circe, while Lois Lane finds herself transformed by the power of the ancient gods into a Wonder Woman.

== Plot ==
The Third Reich never fell and Europe is kept under Nazi tyranny. Superman no longer ages due to his Kryptonian physiology, Lois Lane has visions of Superman gleefully killing people, including herself and Lana Lang, who has been abducted by unknown forces.

The search for Lana takes Lois and Clark to Axis ruled Europe, to discover their mutual friend whereabouts.

In flight Lois and Clark get attacked by harpies and trolls, causing the plane to crash land in fascist Germany.

Lois soon discovers that the Reich is ruled by the god Adonis while Artemis and Athena oppose him. Wonder Woman has betrayed Paradise Island and is now part of the Reich. It is revealed that the Greek pantheon was in league with the Nazis, allowing them to employ mythological monsters to counter superheroes for world domination. A fight ensues between the German army and the Greek heroines. The sacrifice of the goddess Athena endows Lois with powers, transforming her into a new Wonder Woman.

Superman is transformed into an evil centaur by Circe. Lana gifted with the power of the Oracle of Delphi persuades the centaur Superman into realizing his true identity. Superman is transformed into a woman, for his crimes leading an harem of centaur Maenads were against women, therefore, he must take their place. The female Superman infiltrates the Great Hall of the Reich, guarded by the Minotaur. She succeeds in her task due to Lana's magical knowledge and Hephaestus help against Galatea. Lois, as the new Wonder Woman, defeats the Nazi Wonder Woman and ties her up with her magic lasso.

Finally, it is revealed that Zeus and Hera were playing a chess game, using the world as their chess pieces. Adonis is sent to be taken care of by Hades. Superman, Lois (now the new Wonder Woman) and Lana all live together on Superman's fortress on the moon in a polyamorous relation.

== Publication ==
- Whom Gods Destroy #1 (52 page, October 1996)
- Whom Gods Destroy #2 (52 page, November 1996)
- Whom Gods Destroy #3 (52 page, December 1996)
- Whom Gods Destroy #4 (52 page, January 1997)

== See also ==
- List of Elseworlds publications
