= Green Lantern: 1001 Emerald Nights =

2001 comic book one-shot

Publication information
- Publisher: DC Comics
- Format: One-shot
- Genre: Superhero
- Publication date: October 2001
- No. of issues: 1

Creative team
- Written by: Terry LaBan
- Penciller: Rebecca Guay
- Inker: Rebecca Guay
- Colorist: Rebecca Guay

Green Lantern: 1001 Emerald Nights is an American comic book prestige format one-shot published in 2001 by DC Comics through its Elseworlds imprint. It was written by Terry LaBan, with art by Rebecca Guay.

== Plot ==
The story takes place in the Middle East and is based on the folklore of One Thousand and One Nights: "It is told that, long ago, the Sultan died, and his son, Prince Ibn Rayner, inherited the throne..."

The tale blends the modern myths of Green Lantern with the ancient legends of One Thousand and One Nights, as the beautiful Scheherazade tells fantastical stories of a magic lamp, a jade-colored genie, and its owner, Al Jhor Dan.
