= Superman: True Brit =

2004 DC Comics title

- Cover of Superman: True Brit, first published on Oct 30, 2004.

Publication information
- Publisher: DC Comics
- Format: One-shot
- Genre: Superhero
- No. of issues: 1
- Main character: Superman

Creative team
- Written by: John Cleese
- Artist: John Byrne

Superman: True Brit is a DC Comics Elseworlds comic first published in 2004 in the United States, and by Titan Books in the UK. Written by John Cleese and Kim Howard Johnson, with art by John Byrne and Mark Farmer, it reimagines the origin of Superman, by considering how Clark Kent's upbringing would be different if his spaceship had crashed in Weston-super-Mare in England instead of the fictional town of Smallville in Kansas, America.

The story aims to poke fun at the apparent desire to conform embedded in the British psyche, as well as to mock the British tabloid press, in particular the Daily Star. Characters with similarities to Superman regulars Lois Lane, Jimmy Olsen and Perry White make an appearance.

== Plot ==
Kal-El, instead of landing in Kansas, is intentionally sent to England (as it is the heart of the British Empire). He is found by the Clarks, who view a headset video found with Kal-El, learning of his origins. They mistake "Kal-El" for "Colin" and name him Colin Clark. Being raised stereotypically British includes belief in the philosophy: "What would the neighbours think?"

When Colin's powers begin to surface, each power causes a unique problem: when he learns to fly, he smashes the ceiling, and when he acquires heat vision, he accidentally burns his mother, though his father creates glasses (from the glass of his spaceship) to help contain the heat. Eventually Colin agrees not to use his powers, to avoid further damage.

Colin goes to university, meets Louisa Layne-Ferret, who initially ignores him completely, and falls in love with her. After a tragic cricket accident in which the bowler is impaled by Colin's cricket bat, a guilty Colin meets Peregrine Whyte-Badger, who takes both Colin and Louisa under his wing to become reporters for the British tabloid Daily Smear.

Despite his parents' disapproval of the use of his powers, after heroically saving The Rutles, Colin adopts a secret identity and garish costume and becomes Superman.

== Reception ==
The book had a mixed reception from British critics, some of whom felt that the jokes and stereotypes used in the book were tired and no longer valid.

== See also ==
- Superman: Red Son
- List of Elseworlds publications
