= Son of Superman =

Comic book

- Cover to Son of Superman by J. H. Williams III and Mick Gray

Publication information
- Publisher: DC Comics
- Format: One-shot
- Genre: Superhero
- Publication date: 1999
- No. of issues: 1
- Main character(s): Superman; Jon Kent; Lois Lane

Creative team
- Written by: Howard Chaykin; David Tischman
- Artist(s): J. H. Williams III; Mick Gray

Son of Superman is a comic book Elseworlds story, published by DC Comics. Written by Howard Chaykin and David Tischman, with art by J. H. Williams III and Mick Gray. Fifteen years after the disappearance of Superman, Clark Kent and Lois Lane's teenage son, Jon Kent, learns that he is the son of Superman, and has suddenly inherited his powers. Following his father's footsteps, Jon joins a rebel organization, that fights against the now completely corrupt U.S. government, and their plan for total economic segregation.

== Plot ==
The story is set in an unspecified date, when Elizabeth Dole is President of the United States. When a solar flare erupts, teenager Jon Kent manifests superpowers and learns from his mother, Lois Lane, that his father, Daily Planet reporter Clark Kent, was secretly the superhero Superman, who mysteriously disappeared in a foreign country 15 years ago. Jon attempts to follow his father's footsteps as the new Superman in his makeshift costume. To find out the truth of his father's disappearance, Jon helps a terrorist organization, led by Pete Ross and Lana Lang, and discovers that his father has been held in an underground facility. Jon frees his father from his captivity, and the Kent family joyfully reunite. During Superman's absence, Lex Luthor has taken control of the Justice League as well as many other aspects of life in the United States. The Justice League's liaison to Lex Luthor, the Martian Manhunter, is told to recruit Superman into the League once again. When Superman voices his disapproval of Pete Ross and Lana Lang's terrorist methods, his son tells him not to be so hard on them, and also says he is not proud of who his father is. Pete and Lana find the spacecraft that carried Superman to earth, and use it to decode a Kryptonian message they found at the facility where Superman was being kept. Superman finds everything in the Fortress of Solitude has been stolen, while Batman finds out Wonder Woman is funding the terrorists. Pete Ross threatens to expose Lex Luthor as the man responsible for holding Superman captive, and agrees not to reveal the information in exchange for two hundred million dollars. In addition to the two hundred million dollars, Pete gives Lex one of the advanced armors the terrorists used for their operations.

An army of men wearing the armor, led by a man who appears to be Superman, destroys the Statue of Liberty. The Justice League is ordered to bring in Superman, but Batman, Superman and Jon defeat them with the help of Wonder Woman, who has been convinced by Batman to regret her mercenary actions. They find out Luthor used the stolen Kryptonian technology and Superman's genetics to give himself superpowers, but only succeeded in gaining half of the Man of Steel's abilities. Because of his anger built up from all the years of growing up without his father, Jon confronts Luthor alone. Jon initially fares poorly against Luthor, but eventually gains the upper hand and Luthor is defeated. Wonder Woman convinces Lana to turn herself and Pete over to the authorities. The Martian Manhunter is revealed to have worked with Luthor to keep Superman captive, because with Superman out of the way, the Manhunter was the world's most powerful and beloved hero. For his part in the scheme, Martian Manhunter is forced to return to Mars. The Justice League retires from fighting crime to "spend more time with their families". Bruce Wayne, no longer donning the cape and cowl of Batman, decides to run against President Dole in the next election to restore democracy to the country. Jon Kent finally establishes a relationship with his father, and continues his career as a superhero wearing his father's costume.

== Publication ==
- Son of Superman (hardcover, 95 pages, 1999, ISBN 1-56389-595-1)

== See also ==
- List of Elseworlds publications
