= Superman: Red Son =

2003 DC Comics limited series

- Cover art from the Superman: Red Son trade paperback

Publication information
- Publisher: DC Comics
- Schedule: Monthly
- Format: Limited series
- Genre: Superhero
- Publication date: 2003
- No. of issues: 3
- Main character(s): Superman; Batman; Wonder Woman; Lex Luthor; Brainiac

Creative team
- Written by: Mark Millar
- Penciller(s): Dave Johnson; Andrew Robinson; Walden Wong; Killian Plunkett
- Letterer: Ken Lopez
- Colorist: Paul Mounts
- Editor(s): Anton Kawasaki; Mike McAvennie; Maureen McTigue; Tom Palmer Jr.

Collected editions
- Red Son: ISBN 1-4012-0191-1
- Deluxe Edition: ISBN 1-4012-2425-3

Superman: Red Son is an American three-issue prestige format comic book miniseries published by DC Comics that was released under their Elseworlds imprint in 2003. Author Mark Millar created the comic with the premise, "What if Superman had been raised in the Soviet Union?" It received critical acclaim and was nominated for the 2004 Eisner Award for Best Limited Series. The story mixes alternate versions of DC super-heroes with alternate-reality versions of real political figures such as Joseph Stalin and John F. Kennedy. The series spans approximately 1953–2001, save for a futuristic epilogue.

In Red Son, Superman's rocket ship lands on a Ukrainian collective farm rather than in Kansas. As an adult he becomes a state-sponsored superhero whose civilian identity is kept a state secret, and who is described in Soviet radio broadcasts not as fighting for "truth, justice, and the American way", but as the champion of the common worker who fights a never-ending battle for "Stalin, socialism, and the international expansion of the Warsaw Pact".

== Publication history ==
The ideas that made up the story came together over a long stretch of time. Mark Millar said:

Red Son is based on a thought that flitted through my head when I read Superman #300 as a six-year-old. It was an imaginary story where Superman's rocket landed in neutral waters between the USA and the USSR and both sides were rushing to claim the baby. As a kid growing up in the shadow of the Cold War, the notion of what might have happened if the Soviets had reached him first just seemed fascinating to me.

As I got older, I started putting everything together and I first pitched something to DC when I was thirteen, I think — although it was in a much cruder form, of course, and my drawings weren't quite up to scratch.

By 1992, he had already developed many of the plot points:

Instead of landing in Kansas as a child, I've decided to explore what could have happened if his rocket would have landed on a collective farm in the Soviet Union. Instead of working for the Daily Planet, he'll be a reporter for Pravda. There's a reversal of the current situation, this time it's the U.S.A. that's splitting up with Georgia and Louisiana demanding independence — tanks rolling through the streets of New Orleans. I'll be including a whole bunch of DC characters, like Batman and Green Lantern — who you'll see in a new light.

Millar has stated on Twitter that after first coming up with the concept of Red Son when he was 6, he pitched it to DC Comics when he was 13, sold it when he was 27 and published it when he was 33.

Grant Morrison has given interviews about giving Millar the idea of sending Superman back to the past, as was used in the end of Red Son.

Certain images from the series are taken from famous comic book covers or panels. A splash panel from the first issue references Superman's pose on the cover of Superman #1. Another panel showing riots in the U.S. mimics the cover to Action Comics #1, which was the first appearance of Superman.

== Plot ==
The Soviet Union reveals Superman to the world in 1953. The news of a superpowered alien under Soviet control causes panic in the United States, shifting the focus of the Cold War arms race from nuclear weapons to metahumans. CIA agent James Olsen recruits Lex Luthor, a scientist employed by S.T.A.R. Labs, to destroy Superman. Luthor's first act is to cause Sputnik 2 to plummet towards Metropolis. After Superman diverts the satellite away from the city, Luthor retrieves traces of Superman's genetic material from the satellite and uses them to create a monstrous clone of Superman dubbed Superman Two.

Art from Superman: Red Son, by Dave Johnson

Meanwhile, Superman meets Wonder Woman at a diplomatic party, and she develops an attraction towards him. Pyotr Roslov, the head of the NKVD and Joseph Stalin's illegitimate son, is angry that Superman has turned his father's attention away from him and ended his chances of advancing in the Soviet government. Pyotr shoots a dissident couple in front of their son for printing anti-Superman propaganda. Stalin dies from cyanide poisoning, and Superman initially refuses command of the Communist Party, but a chance meeting with Lana Lazarenko, his childhood sweetheart, changes his mind. Superman chooses to use his powers for the greater good and turn his country into a utopia.

The U.S. government sends "Superman Two" to engage Superman, and their duel causes an accidental nuclear missile launch in Great Britain. The clone sacrifices itself to save millions. Luthor murders his research staff at S.T.A.R. Labs and founds LuthorCorp, dedicating his life to destroying Superman.

By 1978, the United States is on the verge of social collapse, whereas the prosperous Soviet Union has peacefully expanded its influence to nearly every corner of the globe. The cost of this progress is an increased infringement on individual liberties, with Superman becoming a Big Brother-like figure, and the introduction of a brain surgery technique that turns dissidents into obedient drones, or "Superman robots". Superman now works with Wonder Woman to save lives as well as govern the Soviet state. Wonder Woman has become increasingly enamored with Superman, but he considers her simply as a comrade, and is oblivious to her love for him.

Luthor plans to shrink Moscow, but this plan fails when Brainiac, his collaborator, shrinks Stalingrad instead. Superman intervenes and retrieves both Brainiac's central processing unit and the city, ending the Brainiac-Luthor cooperation. He is unable to restore Stalingrad and its inhabitants to their proper size. This becomes his one failure and a source of great guilt.

Luthor's third plan involves the vigilante Batman, who has dedicated himself to ending the oppressive Superman regime, and is the boy orphaned by Pyotr. Batman joins forces with LuthorCorp and Pyotr, now head of the KGB. They capture Wonder Woman and use her as bait for Superman, hoping to sap his powers with rays that imitate sunlight from Superman's home planet. The plan works, but Superman convinces Wonder Woman to break free of the lasso that she is tied up with and destroy the generators running the lamps emitting the solar energy. She breaks free and destroys the lamps allowing Superman's powers to return, however she is severely injured in the process. Superman escapes and confronts Batman, who promptly commits suicide to become a martyr for the resistance movement and to escape life as a Superman robot. Pyotr is turned into a Superman robot, and Wonder Woman no longer has feelings for Superman after he shows indifference towards her severe injuries.

Luthor enacts his fourth plan when he finds a mysterious green lantern in an alien ship that crashed at Roswell, New Mexico. Brainiac is reprogrammed into Superman's aide, and the construction of a Fortress of Solitude, located in Siberia and referred to as the "Winter Palace", begins. Superman's reign continues with no crime, poverty, or unemployment, but with an ever-present state authority. Superman is committed to "winning the argument" with the U.S., and repeatedly refuses Brainiac's suggestions of an invasion. Stalingrad remains his one failure, now contained within a protective glass bottle.

In 2001, Luthor and Olsen are elected president and vice president, respectively. Using his scientific expertise, massive economic capital and dictatorial powers, Luthor returns prosperity to his country. This is only a part of a more general plan to provoke Superman into invading the United States. Luthor shows Olsen two of his greatest discoveries: the Phantom Zone and the Green Lantern Corps.

Luthor confronts Superman in the Winter Palace. Brainiac pulls Luthor deep into the recesses of the fortress to be converted surgically into a Superman robot, claiming that Lex would convince Superman to commit suicide in less than 14 minutes. Superman agrees that his hand has been forced, and prepares to attack.

First Lady Lois Luthor visits Paradise Island to forge an alliance with the Amazon empire, now ruled by an embittered and vengeful Wonder Woman. Superman attacks the East Coast, confronting and defeating the Green Lantern Marine Corps, which is led by Colonel Hal Jordan. The Amazon forces, commanded by Wonder Woman, attack Superman but are quickly defeated, along with a collection of "super-menaces" (including the Atomic Skull, Parasite, and Doomsday) that Luthor had put together over the years. Brainiac's spaceship cuts the U.S. Pacific Fleet to pieces, and the two superbeings meet at the White House. They are greeted by Lois Luthor with the last weapon, a small note written by Lex that reads: "Why don't you just put the whole world in a bottle, Superman?".

Realizing he has meddled in affairs that he had no place in, Superman orders Brainiac to end the invasion, but Brainiac reveals that it has never been under Superman's control, and instead attacks Superman with green radiation. Brainiac is shut down from inside by Luthor, who evaded the surgery. As the singularities powering Brainiac's ship threaten to collapse, Superman rockets it into space, where it explodes. The Earth is saved, but Superman is assumingly dead.

The Soviet Union falls into chaos, but is soon brought back under control thanks to the Batmen (resistance members who began wearing the costume after Batman's death). Luthor integrates many of Superman's and Brainiac's ideas into the new philosophy of "Luthorism" and forms a "Global United States". This becomes the defining moment for mankind's future as it enters an unprecedented age of peace and stability. A benevolent world government is formed and maintained. Luthor presides over a string of scientific achievements, including the curing of all known disease and the colonization of the Solar System. Luthor lives for over 1,000 years.

At Luthor's funeral, it is revealed that Superman survived the explosion of Brainiac's ship and is seemingly immortal. Superman attends the funeral wearing a business suit and thick glasses. Luthor's widow Lois, unaware that he is Superman, notices him in the crowd and feels a strange sense of déjà vu, but ultimately suspects nothing of it. Superman walks quietly away from the ceremony, planning to live among humans rather than ruling over them.

Billions of years in the future, Earth is torn apart by tidal stresses from the sun, which has become a red giant. Luthor's descendant, Jor-L, sends his infant son, Kal-L, into the past in a ship. The final panels of the comic book depict the landing of Kal-L's timeship in a Ukrainian collective in 1938, effectively causing a predestination paradox (and, thus, making Superman a descendant of Luthor and Lois).

== Collected editions ==
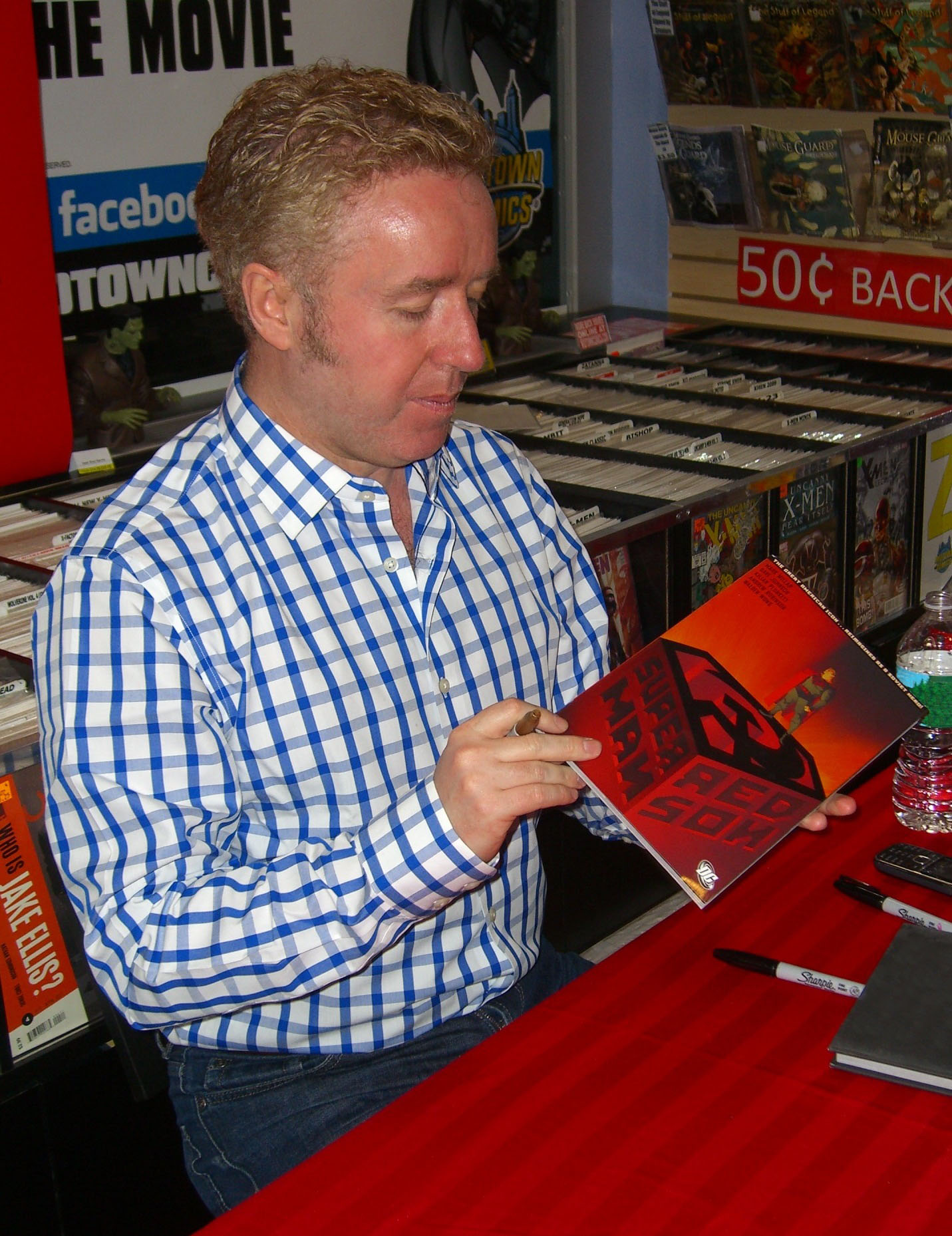
Writer Mark Millar signing a copy of the collected edition during an appearance at Midtown Comics in Manhattan.

In 2004 the story was collected into a 160-page trade paperback. (Titan Books, March 2004, ISBN 1-84023-801-1)

In 2009, it was collected into a 168-page hardcover Deluxe Edition. (Titan Books, December 2009, ISBN 1-84856-431-7)

In 2025, DC released a 232-page Absolute Edition of the work. (DC Comics, May 2025, ISBN 978-1799501558)

== In other DC Comics ==
In The New 52 (a reboot of DC's continuity), the alternate Earth depicted in Superman: Red Son has been designated Earth-30. The Superman of Earth-30 also appeared in the Countdown: Arena series in 2007, in which he came into conflict with the Cold War U.S.-based Supermen of Earth-31 (The Dark Knight Returns) and Earth-15 (Chris Kent). In 2008, Earth-30 and its Soviet Superman also appeared in the Countdown to Final Crisis: The Search for Ray Palmer storyline, where it was one of the alternate Earths visited by Jason Todd, Donna Troy and Kyle Rayner to locate Earth-0's absent Atom (Ray Palmer). Characters from Superman: Red Son also appeared in the Action Comics and Detective Comics tie-ins to the "Convergence" storyline, in which they are forced to fight against the heroes from the original Earth-Two's Metropolis. A promotional comic, Kentucky Fried Chicken Presents: The Colonel Corps had the Colonel Sanders of Earth-30 ("Comrade Sanders") joining with Colonels from other universes to take on Earth-3's evil Colonel Sanders. This Sanders wore an ushanka.

In the alternate 1940 setting of DC Comics Bombshells, Stargirl and Supergirl are both Soviet aviators in the Night Witches, which was seen as a nod to Superman: Red Son.

In 2018, the Batman featured in this story made a cameo appearance in the sixth issue of the Dark Nights: Metal comic book series.

== Merchandise ==
Figures based on characters from the series include Superman, Wonder Woman, Batman, President Superman and Green Lantern. A boxset was released in 2008 featuring Superman, Wonder Woman, Batman, and a remolded Bizarro.

== In other media ==
=== Live action ===
==== Television ====
- The fourth season of Supergirl adapts concepts from the story. In the third-season finale, Supergirl is exposed to black kryptonite, which creates a clone of her. Her clone ends up in Siberia and is secretly trained by the Soviet military in Kaznia under the codename Snowbird. When the clone is exposed to Kryptonite gas, Lex Luthor cures her and adopts her as Red Daughter. Red Daughter, using the alias Linda Lee, works with Lex until he is arrested. Following this, Red Daughter frames Supergirl by attacking the White House disguised as her. Kara and Lex's sister Lena travel to Kaznia, where they discover Red Daughter's origins. When Kara attempts to convince the President of the United States about Red Daughter's true nature, she is kidnapped and placed in a room with Red Daughter to be executed, but the clone is exposed to kryptonite while Kara escapes. Red Daughter disguises herself as Kara and threatens her adoptive mother under Lex's orders, who had escaped prison. Kara goes to confront Red Daughter, who supposedly kills her with Lex's help, but Red Daughter later finds out Lex had betrayed Kaznia and framed himself a public hero by killing Red Daughter in front of the world. Red Daughter is revealed to be alive and being held captive at Shelly Island, where he uses her powers, among those of other kidnapped aliens, to power up a satellite to destroy Argo City in order to kill Superman. During a confrontation between Lex and Kara, Red Daughter sacrifices herself to save the latter after learning of the former's true nature.
- Pyotr Roslov appears in the Arrow episode "Due Process", portrayed by Bruce Blain. This version is a criminal and former KGB agent.

==== Film ====
- In 2017, Jordan Vogt-Roberts had pitched a live-action adaptation for Superman: Red Son to Warner Bros. Pictures but the studio had passed on it. In 2024, Matthew Vaughn expressed interest to direct a film adaptation of the comic book starring Henry Cavill, who previously portrayed Superman in the DC Extended Universe.

=== Animation ===
==== Film ====
- In 2013, James Tucker expressed interest in making an animated movie adaptation of Red Son for DC Universe Animated Original Movies. The animated adaptation of the comic was later released as part of this line. Jason Isaacs starred as Superman opposite Amy Acker as Lois Lane, Diedrich Bader as Lex Luthor, and Paul Williams as Brainiac, with Roger Craig Smith as Batman and Vanessa Marshall as Wonder Woman. Also appearing are William Salyers as Joseph Stalin, Jim Meskimen as John F. Kennedy, Phil Morris as James Olsen, Sasha Roiz as Hal Jordan, Phil LaMarr as John Stewart, Travis Willingham as Superior Man, and Winter Zoli as Svetlana. Anna Vocino, Greg Chun, Jim Ward and Jason Spisak were also in the film. The film was released digitally on February 25, 2020, and on 4K Ultra HD and Blu-ray on March 17.

==== Television ====
- In the Justice League Action episode "Keeping Up with the Kryptonians", Mister Mxyzptlk sends Superman to Kasnia, where he becomes a variation of Red Son Superman.

=== Video games ===
- The video game Injustice: Gods Among Us features DLC costumes for Superman, Wonder Woman, Solomon Grundy, Green Lantern, Batman, and Deathstroke as well as missions that are based on the Red Son storyline.
  - The Red Son SteelBook special edition of Injustice: Gods Among Us, released in the United Kingdom, includes the three character skins for Superman, Wonder Woman and Solomon Grundy and 20 missions set in the Red Son timeline.
- The game Batman: Arkham Origins has the Red Son Batman skin in the game's DLC and is a skin in the iOS version of the game.
- Superman's Red Son outfit appears as a costume variant in Injustice 2. In Green Arrow's ending, the Red Son version of Batman is part of a Multiverse Justice League with Earth-23 Superman, Flashpoint Wonder Woman, and the game's version of Green Arrow.

=== Motion comic ===
- As part of its motion comic series, DC/Warner released a 12-part adaptation of the story on iTunes, with a new episode being released every week beginning in late July 2009. The Superman: Red Son motion comic was animated by New Zealand-based Karactaz Animation and featured a select voice cast based in the Los Angeles region. It had received positive reviews from the motion comics community and has since been released in made-to-order DVD form by WBShop.com.

== See also ==
- List of Elseworlds publications
- Superman: True Brit
