= John Francis Moore (writer) =

American comic book writer

John Francis Moore is an American comic book writer known for stints as writer on such Marvel Comics series as X-Force, X-Factor, Doom 2099 and X-Men 2099. He also wrote Elseworld's Finest and co-wrote Batman/Houdini: The Devil's Workshop with Howard Chaykin for DC's Elseworlds series, and was the writer for Howard Chaykin's American Flagg! series.

== Bibliography ==
=== DC Comics ===
- The Batman Chronicles #11 (1998)
- Batman: Legends of the Dark Knight #42-43 (1993)
- Batman/Houdini: The Devil's Workshop Original Graphic Novel (1993)
- Batman: Family #1-8 (2002–2003)
- Batman: Poison Ivy (1997)
- Batman/Scarecrow 3-D #1 (1998)
- Birds of Prey: Batgirl/Catwoman (2003)
- Birds of Prey: Catwoman/Oracle (2003)
- Catwoman vol. 2 #92-94 (2001)
- Chronos #1-11, #1000000 (1998–1999)
- Detective Comics #773-775 (2002)
- Elseworld's Finest #1-2 (1997)
- Fate #0-4 (1994–1995)
- Legends of the DC Universe 80-Page Giant #1 (1998)
- Superboy vol. 3 #1-6, 8–12, 15-16 (1990–1991)
- Superman: Under a Yellow Sun Original Graphic Novel (1994)
- Superman: The Dark Side #1-3 (1998)
- Touch #1-6 (2004)

=== Marvel Comics ===
- 2099 Limited Ashcan #1 (1993)
- 2099 Unlimited #5 (1994)
- Avengers Annual '99
- Doom 2099 #1-8, 10–15, 17–25, 43-44 (1993–1995, 1996)
- Factor X #1-4 (1995)
- Fantastic Four vol. 3 #33-34 (2000)
- Marvel Comics Presents #118 (1992)
- Tales From the Age of Apocalypse: Sinister Bloodlines (1997)
- Wolverine: Days of Future Past #1-3 (1998)
- X-Factor vol. 1 #108-114 (1994–1995)
- X-Force vol. 1 #63-76, 78–100, #-1 (1997–2000)
- X-Force and Cable Annual '96, '97
- X-Men 2099 #1-35, Special #1 (1993–1996)
- X-Men 2099: Oasis (1996)
- X-Men Annual '97
- X-Men Unlimited #5-6, 12 (1994, 1996)
- X-Men: Phoenix #1-3 (1999–2000)

=== Other publishers ===
- Bambi: The Hunter #1 (1992)
- Dick Tracy #1-2 (1990)
- Howard Chaykin's American Flagg! #2-12 (1988–1989)
- Ironwolf -- Fires of the Revolution OGN (1992)
- Time2: The Satisfaction of Black Mariah (1987)

== Television ==
He wrote episodes of The Flash, Superboy, Human Target, Viper and Palace Guard. On The Flash (1990s TV series), he also served as executive story consultant and story editor.

Preceded by Jeph Loeb	X-Force (vol. 1) writer 1997–2000	Succeeded by Ian Edginton
Preceded by Chris Claremont	Fantastic Four writer 2000	Succeeded by Carlos Pacheco
Preceded by Bronwyn Carlton	Catwoman writer 2001	Succeeded by Ed Brubaker
