= JLA: Created Equal =

2000 comics limited series

Publication information
- Publisher: Elseworlds (DC Comics)
- Schedule: Monthly
- Format: Limited series
- Genre: Superhero
- Publication date: 2000
- No. of issues: 2

Creative team
- Written by: Fabian Nicieza
- Artist: Kevin Maguire

JLA: Created Equal is a two-issue DC Elseworlds series published in 2000. It is written by Fabian Nicieza and illustrated by Kevin Maguire.

== Plot summary ==
A cosmic storm passes through the planet Earth, bringing with it a mysterious plague which kills nearly the entire male population (an event later referred to as the Fall). The only two men who survive are Superman and his archenemy Lex Luthor. Superman was immune to the plague due to his Kryptonian DNA, and Luthor had sealed himself away from the storm's radiation in his battle armor.

The now-all female leadership of Earth selects the island of Themyscira to serve as the new capital of the world, and it is here that the next generation of male children are to be raised in the Amazonian manner. Superman and Lois Lane's son, Adam Kent, is the first newborn male since the storm hit, and more are born through Superman's DNA, granting them Kryptonian powers, while others take on new responsibilities, such as Barbara Gordon being granted Kyle Rayner's Green Lantern ring and becoming the first female human Green Lantern. Superman discovers that he might be a carrier of the plague, and exiles himself from the planet to spare his son's life.

Fifteen years later, Luthor manipulates the sons of Themyscira to rise up and establish a new patriarchal society under his rule, and Superman must return to stop him, even if it means going against his own children. During his exile Superman had discovered a way to inoculate others from the plague he carried, with Luthor's attempt to kill Superman with Kryptonite allowing the cure to work on the Man of Steel; the cure was initially useless on Superman due to his super-immunity, but the kryptonite weakened his immune system. With Luthor dying of a stroke during the conflict, Superman confirms that Luthor intended to kill the Kryptonian children once the Amazons had been defeated and replace them with Luthor's own children, which Superman and the other female heroes vow to raise properly.

== See also ==
- JLA: Act of God, another Elseworlds title based in a similar idea
- Y: The Last Man, also published by DC
- List of Elseworlds publications
