= Supergirl (Linda Danvers) =

- Linda Danvers as Supergirl, from Supergirl (vol. 4) #78, Art by Ed Benes. Her comics incorporated the Supergirl costume originally conceived for the DC Animated Universe.

Publication information
- Publisher: DC Comics
- First appearance: Supergirl (vol. 4) #1 (September 1996)
- Created by: Peter David; Gary Frank (based upon the Kara Zor-El character by Otto Binder and Al Plastino)

In-story information
- Alter ego: Linda Danvers
- Species: Fallen Angel (formerly); Metahuman (currently)
- Place of origin: Silver City – Hell
- Team affiliations: Teen Titans; Justice League of Amazons; Justice League
- Notable aliases: Kara Zor-El; Superwoman
- Abilities: Psychokinesis grants: Superhuman strength, speed, and leaping; Invulnerability; Flight; Telekinesis; (Previously): Flame vision and wings; Teleportation

Linda Danvers, also known as Supergirl, is a comic book superhero appearing in books published by DC Comics. Created by writer Peter David and artist Gary Frank, she debuted in Supergirl (vol. 4) #1 (September 1996). She is not to be confused with Linda Lee Danvers, the secret identity used by the Kara Zor-El incarnation of Supergirl prior to the events of 1985's Crisis on Infinite Earths.

== Publication history ==
Peter David adapted Linda Danvers as a separate character based on that of Kara Zor-El, who had been wiped out of continuity by DC Comics to enforce Superman's status as the sole survivor of Krypton.

According to David, he was aware that many readers would still want Kara Zor-El back as Supergirl, so Linda was created for the fans to feel "more at home. So I gave her as many of the exterior accoutrements of Kara's former life as I possibly could. I gave her parents, and a secret identity of Linda Danvers, in a small town (called "Leesburg", in reference to Linda Lee), and a boyfriend named Dick Malverne, and put Stanhope College nearby. Some fans thought I was being 'in-jokey.' Nah. I just wanted to make the old readers feel at home as best I could."

Linda's Supergirl title (vol. 4) ran between 1997 and 2003, when DC decided to bring Kara Zor-El back as Supergirl. Starting from issue #51, Linda changes her traditional Supergirl costume to the one conceived for the DC Animated Universe, donned by Kara In-Ze.

According to Peter David, if his run on Supergirl had not ended, he would have had the series being a sort of Birds of Prey type comic, featuring the trio of Linda Danvers as Superwoman, the pre-Crisis Kara Zor-El as the current Supergirl, and Power Girl.

According to an interview with Newsarama, following the events of the "Infinite Crisis" storyline, editor-in-chief Dan DiDio stated that the Matrix Supergirl was wiped from existence. However, Infinite Crisis writer Geoff Johns later stated, "As for this…huh? Linda Danvers hasn't been retconned out at all."

== Fictional character biography ==
=== Matrix ===
Linda Danvers was lured into a world of darkness by her boyfriend Buzz, who intended to sacrifice her to summon a demon. Matrix intervenes and attempts to heal Linda, but inadvertently fuses with her instead. Armed with newfound superhuman abilities, Linda begins to fight crime and demonic activity to repent for her past crimes. She is hesitant to reveal her situation to her adoptive "brother" Superman, fearing his reaction to her co-opting a human life, but he accepts the change. Further complicating the situation was the revelation that Matrix's sacrifice transformed her and Linda into the Earth-born Angel of Fire.

=== Earth-born Angel ===
When Linda became an Angel, she developed fiery wings, flame vision, and the ability to teleport. She uses her powers to fight demons and dark gods, and even her fellow Earth-born Angel Blithe. Linda eventually learns that an evangelical preacher had begun a church with Supergirl as its lead centerpiece. Linda meets the equine Comet, who was revealed to be the Angel of Love and her friend Andrea Jones. Stranger still, Linda encounters a young boy named Wally, who claims to be the Presence. Wally helps Linda through her strange transformations, especially when her wings changed from angelic to bat-like. Linda is later captured by Carnivore, the first vampire. She defeats him, with the help of an angelic figure, simply called "Kara". However, Matrix is separated from Linda in the process.

=== Search for Matrix ===
After the split, Linda retains half of the super-strength and invulnerability she had when fused with Matrix. Using some items from a costume shop, Linda creates a white, blue, and red Supergirl costume and acted as Supergirl, while searching for Matrix, with the help of Buzz and Mary Marvel. Linda eventually finds that Matrix has been captured by Lilith, the mother of all demons, who had sent the superhuman Twilight after Supergirl, holding Twilight's sister hostage to keep her under her control. Lilith fatally injures Mary, Twilight, and Linda, but not before Matrix was freed. Linda asks Matrix to merge with Twilight, who becomes the new Angel of Fire. Twilight heals Mary and Linda, thus giving Linda all the powers she had had while merged with Matrix. At this point, Matrix passes the Supergirl mantle on to Linda.

=== "Many Happy Returns" ===
With her powers back to Matrix's original levels, Linda encounters a rocketship containing Kara Zor-El from the pre-Crisis reality. Linda later learns that Kara was resurrected after a cosmic entity called the Fatalist altered the timeline for his own amusement. Kara Zor-El does not accept that she is destined to die and begs Linda to save her. Linda travels to the past in Kara's place, where she encounters Superman. Superman recognizes that Linda is not Kara and admits that he is in love with her. The two end up marrying and have a daughter, Ariella. The Spectre forces Linda to return to the present to restore the timestream and save Kara from Xenon.

Linda defeats Xenon and sends Kara back to her universe, knowing Kara, as an adult, would eventually die in the Crisis on Infinite Earths. Ariella is spared by the Spectre, but Linda is heartbroken over her actions. She learns that her parents have had a second child, ironically named "Wally". Linda reunites with her parents for one last time before leaving everyone and hanging up her cape. She leaves a note for Superman and Lois Lane explaining her decision, saying she felt she had let her loved ones down and so she was no longer worthy of wearing the S.

=== Reign in Hell ===
In the storyline Reign in Hell, Linda is teleported to Hell, as Hell is recalling all of its "debts". Later in the series, Linda uses her flame vision to kill some injured demons who were huddled around a tiny campfire, which horrifies Doctor Occult. Linda believes that no one in Hell is innocent, and then accuses Occult of being a damned soul. Linda says she does not deserve to be trapped in Hell, and that she would see everybody burned to char before she accepted being kept in there. Occult casts a spell to show Linda who she really is, causing her to fly away in horror.

== Powers and abilities ==
Linda was originally a normal human, with no superhuman abilities. Upon fusing with the Matrix Supergirl, Linda gained psychokinetic abilities. This granted her an incredible level of superhuman strength and speed, near invulnerability to harm, and the power to fly at high speeds. Linda was also able to produce concussive blasts of telekinetic energy, typically referred to as "psi blasts".

After being merged with Matrix for some time, Linda became the Earth-Born Angel of Fire. While she retained her original abilities, she also gained the ability to produce bursts of fire from her eyes (called Flame Vision), form angelic wings composed of flames, and could use her wings to create a flaming portal that allowed her to "shunt" (teleport) long distances. Though Linda originally lost her angelic powers after being separated from Matrix, she later seemed to have regained them during the "Reign in Hell" mini-series.

After being separated from Matrix, Linda found herself with reduced powers. She could no longer shapeshift into her "Supergirl" form, and all of her angelic powers were lost. In addition, Linda's strength and durability were reduced by half, she lost her ability to fly and produce psionic blasts, and instead was only able to leap around 1/8th of a mile in a single bound.

After encountering Twilight as the new Earth-Born Angel of Fire, Linda regained all of the powers that she'd possessed while initially merged with Matrix, sans her ability to assume her "Supergirl" form. Her strength and durability returned to their original levels and she was able to fly and produce psionic blasts of force once more.

== Other versions ==
- Supergirl: Wings reworks the Earth-born angel storyline; in it, Linda Danvers is a gothic teenager being corrupted by a demon, while her guardian angel Matrix believes Linda is beyond hope of redemption. The two eventually fuse into an angel who wears a Supergirl-inspired costume.
- In JLA: Created Equal, Linda Danvers, fifteen years after a disease wipes all men from the Earth, changes her name from Supergirl to Superwoman.
- In JLA: Act of God, Linda Danvers is one of many heroes who lose their powers in the Black Light event. However, she, along with Martian Manhunter, Aquaman, and the Flash (Wally West), train with Batman and his associates so they may still be heroes. Changing her name to Justice, Linda and the others form the Phoenix Group.
- Peter David's Fallen Angel implied that Lee, the main character, may be Linda Danvers. When the title moved to another company, her real origin as a guardian angel named Liandra was given. However, IDW Publishing's Fallen Angel #14 introduced a character known as "Lin". While David could not explicitly state that this character is Linda Danvers due to legal concerns, he confirmed his intent in an interview.
- In the 2021 series Supergirl: Woman of Tomorrow, Supergirl temporarily gains fiery wings after taking a red kryptonite-based drug, a homage to Linda Danvers.

== Collected editions ==
Title	Material collected	ISBN	Year
Supergirl: Book One	Supergirl (vol. 4) #1–9, Supergirl (vol. 4) Annual #1, Supergirl Plus #1 and a story from Showcase '96 #8.	978-1401260927	2016
Supergirl: Book Two	Supergirl (vol. 4) #10–20, Supergirl (vol. 4) Annual #2	978-1401265533	2017
Supergirl: Book Three	Supergirl (vol. 4) #21–31, 1,000,000; Resurrection Man #16–17	978-1401268794	2017
Supergirl: Book Four	Supergirl (vol. 4) #32–43; Young Justice #12-13	978-1401273644	2018
Supergirl: Many Happy Returns	Supergirl (vol. 4) #75-80	978-1401200855	2003
DC Finest: Supergirl: Body and Soul	Supergirl (vol. 4) #1–18, Supergirl Annual (vol. 4) #1–2, Supergirl Plus #1, and a story from Showcase '96 #8	978-1799510260	2025
DC Finest: Supergirl: Die and Let Live	Supergirl (vol. 4) #19–35, #1,000,000, Resurrection Man #16–17, Supergirl/Prysm Double-Shot #1, and stories from Adventure Comics 80-Page Giant #1, Team Superman #1, and Team Superman Secret Files #1	978-1799513605	2026

== In other media ==
- Linda Danvers serves as visual inspiration for Kara In-Ze in the DC Animated Universe (DCAU).
- An alternate universe version of Kara Zor-El using the name Linda Danvers appears in the Smallville episode "Apocalypse", portrayed by Laura Vandervoort. This version is from a timeline where Kara was raised by the Luthors.
- A Supergirl-based cult loosely based on the Church of Supergirl appears in the third season of Supergirl.
- Linda Danvers appears in Justice League Heroes, voiced by Tara Strong.
