= American comic book tropes =

American comic book tropes are common elements and literary devices related to American comic books.

== Continuity ==
Comics continuity almost-always refers to the existence and use of a shared universe, although any comic can have internal continuity independent of this. Simply, the term describes a consistency of internal plot, and usually of characterisation and external references also. Initially, many comics were stand alone, "done in one" stories with a beginning and end taking place within the confines of a single comic issue, often structured in chapters as are most novels. Over time, the comics companies realised the lucrative potential of the crossover comic, whereby other characters from a company's shared universe appeared in issues of each other's comics. This ultimately led to the formation of "team" books such as the Justice Society of America, Justice League of America and Avengers.

During these crossover character interactions, editorial footnotes would often reference previous adventures and comics issues, but an actual editorially enforced "continuity" was not strictly adhered to, leading to some characters' actions appearing "out of character", or outrightly contradicting earlier plot-points. As comics were deemed largely ephemeral items, this was not considered that much of a problem, until the full advent of comics fandom. As a result of fan/reader scrutiny, the continuity both of individual characters and of the wider universes in which comics companies' characters interacted began to become more important. The Marvel "No Prize" became a humorous method by which readers could write letters to authors and editors pointing out mistakes or "continuity errors" in various comics, and were then named in print and awarded a "No Prize" (in reality a coveted sheet of paper declaring itself a non prize).

In 1985, cross-universe continuity took on new levels of depth and (intended) consistency at the two main comics companies: DC and Marvel. Marvel launched its cross-line toy-driven-event Secret Wars, which required all characters to undergo specific changes at specific times, and required considerable editorial dictates and conformity. DC launched the Crisis on Infinite Earths, one of the earliest maxi-series', to address universe-wide continuity and attempt to explain away, remove or revise all previous errors in continuity. The reader was reminded that the DC Multiverse consisted not merely of the core DC Universe, but of a number of different iterations of various heroes on a multitude of different planets. Companies and characters purchased by DC (such as the Charlton Comics characters and Captain Marvel) as well as older characters like the JSA were (re-)assigned their own Earths, which were then destroyed and folded into one, core Earth. This naturally resulted in a number of contradictions and discrepancies in individual characters' histories, so a new, uniform continuity was created and the revised origins of the resulting heroes were retold in the hopes of maintaining consistent continuity.

With hundreds of characters and dozens of writers, over the years uniform and consistent continuity is difficult to maintain, and most comics companies periodically address the erosion of internal consistency with big "events" designed to explain and simplify (although at times they do neither) discrepancies, and maintain continuity.

=== Canon ===
Similar to internal continuity, the canon of comics characters/universes is often subject to change, but refers to the stories which are, at any one point, part of the "official", "accepted" history and story of particular characters/universes. Alternate versions of characters (such as DC's Elseworlds and Marvel's speculative What if...? titles) are necessarily not canon, but the stories can change from being non-canonical to being accepted as canon - and vice versa. In particular, line-wide continuity-changing events (such as DC's Crises and Marvel's controversial recent Spider-Man: One More Day storyline) retroactively affect which stories are part of a character/universe's core canon, as they may revise or ignore previous events and happenings.

For example, DC's Crisis on Infinite Earths addressed continuity and consistency errors over almost 50 years of comics publication, and retrofitted events and characters into the history of the DCU as if they had always been there (for example, the JSA went from being JLA-contemporaries from a parallel world to being their earlier, historical counterparts some years previously). The Post-Crisis DC Universe removed many stories from "official canon", explaining them as Imaginary Tales or ignoring them completely.

=== Retcon ===
Retcon or "ret-con" is a portmanteau shorthand phrase for "retroactive continuity", and is the descriptive term used to explain continuity- and canon-affecting stories. A retcon affects the past history of characters and/or the whole shared universe, and says that the "new" changed events have always been that way. This can lead to intense confusion, as compounded events can cause even the most knowledgeable fan to falter over what is currently the accepted canon.

Linked is retrofit, retroactively embedding something (usually a plot point or subsidiary character) into a past story, for the purposes of a current story. This can give added weight to a story, implying that the impetus for a current story had been around for some time; for example, the X-Men: Deadly Genesis limited series from 2006 "retrofit" the story line from 1975's Giant-Size X-Men #1 to include new characters and plot points. It can also be used to update a character for more modern times; for instance, Iron Man (vol. 4) #1 updated Iron Man's origin story so that he was wounded in Afghanistan instead of Vietnam.

==== Pre- and Post-Crisis ====
Labels referring to DC Universe continuity and canon, with the separator being the 1985 retcon event Crisis on Infinite Earths. Simply, Pre-Crisis stories were not as stringently policed or edited, and often contained errors and internal inaccuracies (in large part because of their frequent nature as one-shot stories, rather than linked tales designed to follow evolving and changing characters). Pre-Crisis stories are often seen as throwaway and frivolous, perceived to be dominated by imaginary tales and "camp" characterisation. Neither label is entirely accurate, nor is the broad-brush assumption that a lack of cohesive continuity denotes a complete disregard for it.

The Post-Crisis DCU is that which was formed in the pages of the CoIE maxiseries, and is (or was intended to be) far more internally consistent and interlinked. Characters' origins were revised and updated, conflating previous stories and origins into one, accepted canonical one. Writer-artist John Byrne's Superman: The Man of Steel miniseries, for example, provided the Post-Crisis origin of Kal-El, while Crisis-architects Marv Wolfman and George Pérez produced the two-issue History of the DC Universe to briefly detail a broad overview of the Post-Crisis DCU, showing the sequence of events as well as the revised origins of many characters (later to be fleshed out in their own series).

Even the Post-Crisis DCU was not without its continuity problems, and several subsequent events have attempted to address them, making the "Post-Crisis" label largely defunct. However, because of the 1985 maxiseries' landmark status, the label persists in one form or another.

=== Imaginary tales, Elseworlds, alternates, possible futures, What If...? ===
All these terms refer to specific and general "non-canonical stories", often – but not exclusively – featuring alternate versions of established heroes, events, or both. For many years, some DC comics would feature stories labelled as "Imaginary Tales", signifying that the events which occurred therein did not have an active effect on continuity, and therefore that anything could happen, even the bizarre and contradictory. DC transitioned to the Elseworlds imprint, whereas Marvel created the What If...? series.

=== Origins ===
A character's "origin" is the fictional story which describes (almost always solely for superheroes) how they came to be; gained their powers; arrived on Earth; were bitten by a radioactive spider, etc. Origins need not be established immediately; they can be told in flashback, or slowly over the course of several issues or, indeed, years. Origins are often subject to revision and retcons, and may find themselves having additional information retrofitted in at a later time.

They are also frequently updated to better reflect their times. For example, the origin of Iron Man has gradually been revised and updated, so that instead of serving in the Vietnam War, he serves in Korea or the (first) Gulf War.

== Storylines ==
=== Events ===
A comics "event" describes a large storyline which almost always involves a crossover between one or more characters, titles, universes or companies, but usually denotes an internal company crossover. These then typically fall into two broad categories: character or universe events. i.e. a Batman "event" will likely only feature the Batman family of characters (an example would be the Batman: Knightfall storylines), while a multi-character crossover will usually be universe-wide and affect several different individuals (an example would be Marvel's "Civil War" event, which affected almost every character and title in their shared universe).

Cross-universe events and intercompany events are considerably rarer, but do happen. 1996's DC vs. Marvel event saw the DCU and MU brought together (and ultimately, briefly, merged), while the DC Universe has also featured in events/crossovers with, for example, the WildStorm and Milestone universes.

=== Shared universe ===
The concept of a shared universe is one in which a multitude of different characters co-exist and/or interact. Typically this concept confines itself to one publishing company's output (although concepts such as the Wold Newton family extend the boundaries considerably), and it is most common in the main superhero universes of DC and Marvel. The benefit of having a shared universe is that characters can make (sales-boosting) guest appearances and allow for team-ups between different characters, as well as allowing the "team" concept (the JLA, the Avengers, etc.) to exist at all. Stan Lee's initial Marvel Universe creations in the 1960s best exemplify the "shared universe" concept, whereby characters (and villains) would feature across multiple titles, sometimes in the foreground of the story, sometimes as cameos in passing, but always underlining the interlinkedness of the universe.

The concept of a shared universe, wherein a company's diverse cast of characters are able to interact and crossover between books and events is usually labelled the "Universe" (DC, Marvel, Image, CrossGen, Valiant, etc.). Comics fandom has produced various shorthand ways of referring to the various universes, however, and the comics themselves also refer to themselves in specific ways. These labels are usually reserved for the universes of "the Big Two" (Marvel and DC), in large part because they are the main American comics publishers and have the largest shared universes. A non-exhaustive list of terms includes:

==== Marvel ====
The Marvel Universe, sometimes abbreviated to MU, is the shared universe in which the X-Men, Spider-Man, the Avengers, etc. all exist and interact.

- Earth-616, the Six-One-Six, etc., denotes the numerical designation of the Earth which the Marvel Universe inhabits. The term was coined in the pages of Captain Britain, by either Alan Moore or Dave Thorpe.
- Ultimate Marvel is a separate universe created to reinvent longstanding characters without affecting the main continuity.

==== DC ====
The DC Universe, or DCU, refers to the shared universe inhabited by Batman, Superman, the Justice League of America, etc.

- Earth-1 was the Pre-Crisis designation of the "main" DCU, in contrast to Earth-2 (featuring the JSA), and latterly dozens of individual Earths which were home to a plethora of characters, and were destroyed in the Crisis on Infinite Earths maxiseries.
- New Earth is the designation of the "main" DCU after the events on 2005's miniseries event Infinite Crisis, in which a revised Multiverse of 52 worlds was created.

==== Duck universe ====
Disney's Uncle Scrooge and associated titles take place inside the Duck universe, a fan appellation.

==== Imprints ====
In addition to the core shared universe, some companies have subsidiary universes/imprints, which can be part of the main universe, or cannot be (or can be thoroughly confusing). DC Comics' mature readers' imprint Vertigo Comics, for example, mainly publishes stand-alone ongoing series, miniseries and maxiseries, but also variously includes characters who were once part of the DCU, or have interacted with it in such a way as to make them at least an honorary part of it. Characters such as The Sandman family of titles, the Doom Patrol and the Swamp Thing all began publication as part of the DCU, but have gradually drifted to a corner of it quite far removed, if still nominally a part. The WildStorm Universe, which was initially published by Image Comics, is now largely accepted as part of the wider DC Multiverse, but not part of the DCU-proper. Similarly, the Ultimate Marvel Universe is not part of the 616, while the MAX imprint is on the fringes in a similar way to the Vertigo/DC interaction.

=== Crossovers ===
Crossovers can be both internal and between different universes and companies. At their most basic level, a crossover can refer simply to a character making a guest appearance in a different comic (e.g. Daredevil "crossing over" into an issue of a Spider-Man comic), but typically a "crossover" implies more than a simple appearance and denotes a cohesive storyline spanning more than one title, often as part of an event. These may also include a tie-in.

== Superheroes ==
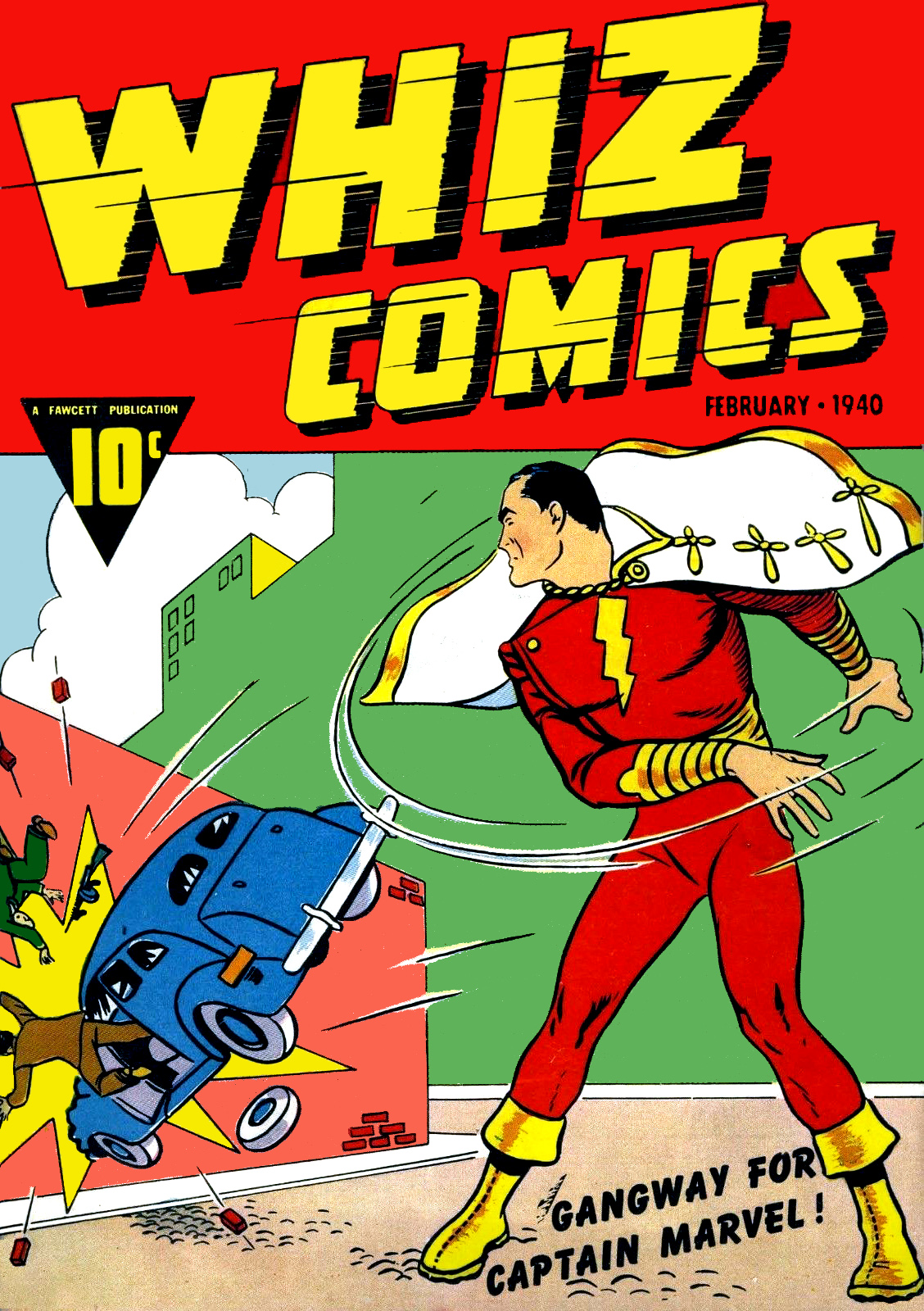
1940 Captain Marvel comic

As of 2010, superhero comics are the most popular genre of comic book in North America. There are many definitions of a superhero, and the subject is debated by scholars and industry professionals. Peter Coogan identifies influences to comic book superheroes in the form of super-strong comic strip characters, pulp heroes, masked vigilantes dubbed "mystery men", and precursors, who lack specific elements of modern superhero convention. According to Coogan, Superman is the first character to bring together all of the necessary elements. Coogan defines the superhero as "a heroic character with a selfless, pro-social mission" who has powers, a codename, colorful costume, and usually a secret identity.

== Technical terms ==
American comic books can be sold through the direct market. Formats include single issues, trade paperbacks, and graphic novels. Graphic novels may also be known as "prestige format" comics for single issues. Issues may be published as one-shots or periodically.

== See also ==
- Manga iconography
- Comic strip
- Comix
- Trope
  - Fantasy tropes
