= Craig Shutt =

American writer and editor

Craig Shutt is an American freelance writer and editor, best known as the author of Baby Boomer Comics, a collection of his “Ask Mr. Silver Age” column about 1960s comics for the Comics Buyer’s Guide monthly magazine, which ceased publication in 2013. He also moderates the Mr. Silver Age message board at the Comics Roundtable at captaincomics.ning.com.

== Writing career ==
Shutt became a freelance writer in 1992, and began writing humorous articles about comics for the Comics Buyer's Guide (CBG) with issue #955 (March 6, 1992). The articles focused on comics published during the years 1956–1970, known as the Silver Age of comic books. His column began in CBG #1020 (June 4, 1993) and became monthly in CBG #1476 (March 1, 2002). It ran in every issue until the last issue of CBG, #1699 (March 2013).

His annual column on the “Mopee Awards” highlights Silver Age comics with illogical plots or events. The “Mopee” term derives from a character appearing in The Flash #167 (February 1967). The term is used commonly in comics fandom to indicate a situation in a plot that fans ignore because it contradicts generally accepted continuity.

Since 1996, he has moderated a Silver Age Trivia Challenge panel at the Chicago Comic-Com (formerly WizardWorld Chicago) and now the Chicago Comic & Entertainment Exhibition (C2E2).

Four of his early columns were reprinted in Dr. Wonder #3 (July 1996), #4 (October 1996) and #5 (Fall 1997) published by Old Town Publishing. His Baby Boomer Comics book included illustrations of Mr. Silver Age by Jim Mooney, a long-time comic-book illustrator.

== Published works ==
- Shutt, Craig (2003). Baby boomer comics: the wild, wacky, wonderful comic books of the 1960s. Iola, Wisconsin: Krause. ISBN 978-0873496681.
