= Elseworlds =

Imprint of comics from DC Comics

Elseworlds logo

Elseworlds is the publication imprint for American comic books produced by DC Comics for stories that take place outside the DC Universe canon. Elseworlds publications are set in alternate realities that deviate from the established continuity of DC's regular comics. The "Elseworlds" name was trademarked in 1989, the same year as the first Elseworlds publication.

== History ==
=== Imaginary Stories ===
The title page of "Superman, Cartoon Hero!" (a slightly retooled reprint of 1942's "Superman, Matinee Idol") stated that the story was "Our first imaginary story", and continued to say: "In 1942, a series of Superman shorts started showing throughout the U.S.! So, with tongue firmly in cheek, the DC team turned out this story of what might have happened if Lois Lane had decided to see... Superman, Cartoon Hero!" The story opens with Lois determined to learn Superman's secret identity and going to the theater to see the Max Fleischer Superman short "The Mad Scientist" in hopes of seeing the animated Man of Steel reveal his secret identity. In addition to other things, when the opening credits roll and state that the cartoons are based on DC Comics, Lois Lane states that she has never heard of DC Comics. Clark Kent then wonders if the people there are clairvoyant. In the final panel, Clark Kent exchanges a knowing wink with the image of himself as Superman on the movie screen.

In Action Comics #60 (May 1943), "Lois Lane – Superwoman!" told the story of Lois gaining superpowers from a transfusion of Superman's blood; while this is explicitly a dream sequence, it has been called "a forerunner of what would be known as 'Imaginary Stories'".

Craig Shutt, author of the Comics Buyer's Guide column Ask Mr. Silver Age, states that true imaginary stories differed from stories that were dreams and hoaxes. Dreams and hoaxes were "gyps" on account of "not having happened", whilst true imaginary stories were canonical at least unto themselves. Also, since they were "just" imaginary and thus had no bearing on the characters' regular stories, imaginary stories could show things like people dying and the victory of evil. In the optimistic and hopeful Silver Age of Comics, such stories usually would not be told; this was hinted with writers telling readers how such an Imaginary Story often reassured the readers that it did not really happen.

Most of these Imaginary Stories featured alternate histories of characters, such as "The Amazing Story of Superman-Red and Superman Blue!". There, readers saw possible pasts that could have happened, but did not happen. One such story has Superman being raised by apes in imitation of Tarzan, an idea that would be recycled into a later Elseworlds tale where Tarzan and Superman were switched at birth. Possible present times were shown, such as one story where Jonathan and Martha Kent, touched by pity, adopt a recently orphaned Bruce Wayne and raise him along with their own son, Clark. Thus, the present shows Superman and Batman as brothers, with Clark protecting Gotham and working for the Gotham Gazette instead of living in Metropolis, and Batman inviting his foster parents, the Kents, to live with him in Wayne Manor. In keeping with the fact that imaginary stories allowed for much grimmer stories than usual, the story ended with Lex Luthor killing the Kents and Batman trying to murder him in revenge.

This Super-Wedding is REAL!
The marriage is not a HOAX!
The bride and groom are not ROBOTS!
This romance is not a DREAM of LOIS LANE or SUPERMAN!

— Superman's Girl Friend, Lois Lane #15 (Feb. 1960)

Possible futures that "could very well happen" were explored, such as Clark Kent revealing to Lois Lane his secret identity and marrying her. Futures that "perhaps never will" happen were also examined, such as the permanent death of Superman. Imaginary Stories appeared often enough that some comics – such as Superman's Girl Friend, Lois Lane #15 (February 1960), the cover of which appears to depict Superman marrying Lois Lane – had to assure readers that their contents were not "imaginary". The cover of Lois Lane #59 (August 1965), by contrast, promised that its depiction of Lois as the romantic rival of Lara, Jor-El's girlfriend and future mother of Superman, was "real--not imaginary!".

A few Imaginary Stories appeared in other DC publications. Batman editor Jack Schiff supervised stories in which the Dark Knight starts a family or loses his identity, though these were revealed at the end of the story to be stories written by Alfred. Schiff's stories were notable for the first appearance of the original Bruce Wayne Junior. Writer/editor Robert Kanigher supervised Wonder Woman's own series of Imaginary Stories called Impossible Tales which featured the same principle. There, Wonder Woman appeared along with her younger selves, Wonder Girl and Wonder Tot. The majority of Imaginary Stories were published in various Superman comics under the guidance of Superman editor Mort Weisinger, the "King of Imaginary Stories". This was in part because, according to Shutt, Weisinger aimed for younger readers instead of older ones. Later editors such as Julius Schwartz rarely used the Imaginary Stories concept.

Alan Moore's "Whatever Happened to the Man of Tomorrow?" two-part story in Superman #423 and Action Comics #583 in 1986 was the last Pre-Crisis story to use the Imaginary Stories label.

=== Elseworlds imprint ===
The first Elseworlds title was Gotham by Gaslight (1989), written by Brian Augustyn and drawn by Mike Mignola, which featured a Victorian Age version of the superhero Batman hunting Jack the Ripper, who had come to Gotham City. The title was not originally published as an Elseworlds comic, but its success led to the creation of the Elseworlds imprint and this title was retroactively declared the first Elseworlds story. The first book to feature the Elseworlds logo was Batman: Holy Terror in 1991. In 1994, the Elseworlds imprint was used as the theme for the annual edition comic books of that summer.

DC sporadically published various Elseworlds titles from 1989 to 2003. In August 2003, editor Mike Carlin mentioned that DC had scaled back the production of Elseworlds books in order to "put the luster back on them". Several titles that were announced as Elseworlds books prior to this, such as Superman & Batman: Generations IV and The Teen Titans Swingin' Elseworlds Special, were cancelled. The planned Teen Titans tale was released in January 2008 as the Teen Titans Lost Annual.

In September 2009, Dan DiDio revealed the return of the Elseworlds imprint as a series of Prestige Format books, with the approach of taking the basic concepts and origins of DC characters and twisting them in various ways. The only Elseworlds story released under the initiative was the three-issue miniseries Superman: The Last Family of Krypton, published from August to October 2010, which told the story of baby Kal-El reaching Earth with his mother and father and how the world handles the emergence of a superpowered family.

After a 14-year absence, DC relaunched the imprint in 2024 with six titles confirmed:

- Gotham by Gaslight: The Kryptonian Age by Andy Diggle and Leandro Fernández
- Batman the Barbarian by Greg Smallwood
- Dark Knights of Steel: Allwinter by Jay Kristoff and Tirso Cons
- Green Lantern: Dark by Tate Brombal and Werther Dell'Edera
- Batman: Nightfire by Clay and Seth Mann
- DC vs. Vampires: World War V by Matthew Rosenberg and Otto Schmidt

==== Relationship to DC continuity ====
Although the Elseworlds imprint was created to feature stories separate from DC continuity, concepts from various Elseworlds stories were incorporated into DC continuity at various times.

The Kingdom miniseries in 1999 brought the 1996 Kingdom Come miniseries into DC continuity as part of a series of alternate timelines known as Hypertime, which included some of the alternate worlds depicted in various Elseworlds titles.

A new Multiverse was introduced at the conclusion of the 52 weekly series that includes alternate worlds that were previously seen in various Elseworlds titles.

== In other media ==
"Elseworlds" was the title for the fifth crossover in the Arrowverse franchise, which aired from December 9 to 11, 2018, on The CW. The crossover was told across episodes of The Flash, Arrow and Supergirl and introduced Batwoman, Gotham City, Nora Fries, and Lois Lane to the Arrowverse.

== Quotes ==
In Elseworlds, heroes are taken from their usual settings and put into strange times and places—some that have existed, or might have existed, and others that can't, couldn't or shouldn't exist. The result: stories that make characters who are as familiar as yesterday seem as fresh as tomorrow.

— Introduction at the beginning of every Elseworlds comic book

== See also ==
- DC Black Label - DC Comics's current imprint for artist deviations
- What If – Marvel Comics' similar comic book line
- Intercompany crossover
- List of Elseworlds publications
