= List of DC Comics publications (P–S) =

DC Comics is one of the largest comic book publishers in North America. DC has published comic books under a number of different imprints and corporate names. This is a list of all series, mini-series, limited series, one-shots and graphic novels published under the imprints DC or AA, and published by National Periodical Publications, National Comics Publications, All-American Comics, Inc., National Allied Publications, Detective Comics, Inc., and related corporate names, as well as imprints publishing titles directly related to the DC Universe characters and continuity, such as Elseworlds and DC Black Label. The list does not include collected editions; trade paperbacks; digital comics; free, promotional giveaways; or magazines, nor does it include series from imprints mainly publishing titles that are separate from the DC Universe continuity, such as Vertigo or WildStorm; series published under those imprints that are related to the DC Universe continuity are noted, but not listed.

While generally the most recognizable name of a comic is printed on the cover, the cover title can be changed for a number of reasons. For example, Action Comics has frequently been listed as Action Comics featuring Superman or Superman in Action Comics, or even on occasion Supergirl in Action Comics. The official name, however, is found in the indicia, in small print inside the comics.

- List of DC Comics publications (A–B)
- List of DC Comics publications (C–F)
- List of DC Comics publications (G–J)
- List of DC Comics publications (K–O)
- List of DC Comics publications (T–Z)

== P ==
Title	Series	Issues	Dates	Notes	Reference
Parallax: Emerald Night		#1	Nov 1996	One-shot	
Pat Boone		#1–5	Sep/Oct 1959 – May/Jun 1960		
Peacemaker		#1–4	Jan 1988 – Apr 1988	Limited series. An earlier series was published by Charlton Comics.	
Peacemaker: Disturbing the Peace		#1	Mar 2022	One-shot; published under the DC Black Label imprint	
Peacemaker Presents: The Vigilante/Eagly Double Feature!		#1–5	May 2025 – Oct 2025	Limited series; published under the DC Black Label imprint	
Peacemaker Tries Hard!		#1–6	Jul 2023 – Dec 2023	Limited series; published under the DC Black Label imprint	
The Penguin		#0–12	Oct 2023 – Nov 2024		
Penguin: Pain & Prejudice		#1–5	Dec 2011 – Apr 2012	Limited series	
The Penguin Special		#1	Dec 2024	One-shot	
Pennyworth		#1–7	Oct 2021 – Apr 2022	Limited series	
Peter Cannon, Thunderbolt		#1–12	Sep 1992 – Aug 1993	An earlier series was published by Charlton Comics.	
Peter Panda		#1–31	Aug/Sep 1953 – Aug/Sep 1958		
Peter Porkchops		#1–62	Nov/Dec 1949 – Dec 1960		
The Phantom	vol. 1	#1–4	May 1988 – Aug 1988	Limited series. Several other Phantom series have been published by other companies.	
The Phantom	vol. 2	#1–13	May 1989 – May 1990		
Phantom Lady		#1–4	Oct 2012 – Jan 2013	Limited series	
The Phantom Stranger	vol. 1	#1–6	Aug/Sep 1952 – Jun/Jul 1953		
The Phantom Stranger	vol. 2	#1–41	May/Jun 1969 – Feb/Mar 1976		
The Phantom Stranger	vol. 2	#42	Mar 2010	Blackest Night tie-in	
The Phantom Stranger	vol. 3	#1–4	Oct 1987 – Jan 1988	Limited series	
The Phantom Stranger	vol. 4	#0–8	Nov 2012 – Jul 2013	Becomes Trinity of Sin: The Phantom Stranger	
The Phantom Zone		#1–4	Jan 1982 – Apr 1982	Limited series	
Picture Stories From The Bible		#1–4	1942 – Fall 1943	Old Testament	
Picture Stories From The Bible		#1–2	1944 – 1945	New Testament. A third issue was published by EC Comics.	
Pinky and the Brain		#1–27	Jul 1996 – Nov 1998		
Pinky and the Brain	Christmas Special	#1	Jan 1996	One-shot	
Planet of the Apes/Green Lantern		#1–6	Feb 2017 – Jul 2017	Limited series; co-published with Boom! Studios	
Planetary/Batman: Night On Earth		#1	Aug 2003	One-shot; WildStorm crossover	
Planetary/JLA: Terra Occulta		#1	Nov 2002	Elseworlds one-shot; WildStorm crossover	
Plastic Man	vol. 1	#1–10	Nov/Dec 1966 – May/Jun 1968	An earlier series was published by Quality Comics.	
Plastic Man	vol. 1	#11–20	Feb/Mar 1976 – Oct/Nov 1977	An earlier series was published by Quality Comics.	
Plastic Man	vol. 2	#1–4	Nov 1988 – Feb 1989	Limited series	
Plastic Man	vol. 3	#1–20	Feb 2004 – Mar 2006		
Plastic Man	vol. 4	#1–6	Aug 2018 – Jan 2019	Limited series	
Plastic Man 80-Page Giant		#1	Dec 2003	One-shot	
Plastic Man No More!		#1–4	Nov 2024 – Feb 2025	Limited series; published under the DC Black Label imprint	
Plastic Man Special		#1	Aug 1999	One-shot	
Plop!		#1–24	Sep/Oct 1973 – Nov/Dec 1976		
Plunge		#1–6	Apr 2020 – Oct 2020	Limited series; published under the DC Black Label/Hill House Comics imprint	
Poison Ivy		#1–	Aug 2022 – present		
Poison Ivy		2025 Annual #1	2025		
Poison Ivy: Cycle of Life and Death		#1–6	Jan 2016 – Jun 2016	Limited series	
Poison Ivy/Swamp Thing: Feral Trees		#1	Dec 2024	One-shot	
Poison Ivy: Thorns			2021	Graphic novel	
Poison Ivy: Uncovered		#1	Sep 2023	One-shot	
The Power Company		#1–18	Apr 2002 – Sep 2003		
The Power Company	Bork	#1	Mar 2002	One-shot	
The Power Company	Josiah Power	#1	Mar 2002	One-shot	
The Power Company	Manhunter	#1	Mar 2002	One-shot	
The Power Company	Sapphire	#1	Mar 2002	One-shot	
The Power Company	Skyrocket	#1	Mar 2002	One-shot	
The Power Company	Striker Z	#1	Mar 2002	One-shot	
The Power Company	Witchfire	#1	Mar 2002	One-shot	
The Power Company: Recharged		#1	Jun 2025	One-shot	
Power Girl	vol. 1	#1–4	Jun 1988 – Sep 1988	Limited series	
Power Girl	vol. 2	#1–27	Jul 2009 – Oct 2011		
Power Girl	vol. 3	#1–20	Nov 2023 – Jun 2025		
Power Girl Special		#1	Jul 2023	One-shot	
Power Girl: Uncovered		#1	Mar 2024	One-shot	
Power Lords		#1–3	Dec 1983 – Feb 1984	Limited series	
The Power of Shazam!			1994	Graphic novel	
The Power of Shazam!		#1–47	Mar 1995 – Mar 1999		
The Power of Shazam!		#48	Mar 2010	Blackest Night tie-in	
The Power of Shazam!		#1,000,000	Nov 1998	DC One Million tie-in	
The Power of Shazam!		Annual #1	1996		
Power of the Atom		#1–18	Aug 1988 – Nov 1989		
The Powerpuff Girls		#1–70	May 2000 – Mar 2006	Based on the TV series	
The Powerpuff Girls Movie: The Comic		#1	Sep 2002	One-shot movie adaption	
Prez	vol. 1	#1–4	Aug/Sep 1973 – Feb/Mar 1974		
Prez	vol. 2	#1–6	Aug 2015 – Feb 2016	Limited series	
Primal Force		#0–14	Oct 1994 – Dec 1995		
Primer			2020	Graphic novel	
Primer		#1–4	May 2024 – Aug 2024	Limited series; serialized reprinting of graphic novel	
Primer: Clashing Colors		#1–3	Sep 2024 – Nov 2024	Limited series	
Princess Natasha		#1–4	Aug 2006 – Nov 2006		
The Prisoner		#1–4	Dec 1988 – Feb 1989	Limited series	
Prometheus (Villains)		#1	Feb 1998	One-shot; part of the New Year's Evil series	
The Psyba-Rats		#1–3	Apr 1995 – Jun 1995	Limited series	
The Psycho		#1–3	Sep 1991 – Dec 1991	Limited series	
Punchline Special		#1	Jan 2021	One-shot	
Punchline: The Gotham Game		#1–6	Dec 2022 – May 2023	Limited series	
Punisher/Batman: Deadly Knights			Oct 1994	One-shot; co-published with Marvel	

== Q ==
Title	Series	Issues	Dates	Notes	Reference
Quarantine Zone			2016	Graphic novel	
Quest for Camelot		#1	Jul 1998	One-shot movie adaptation	
The Question	vol. 1	#1–36	Feb 1987 – Apr 1990		
The Question	vol. 1	#37	Mar 2010	Blackest Night tie-in	
The Question	vol. 1	Annual #1–2	1988 – 1989		
The Question	vol. 2	#1–6	Jan 2005 – Jun 2005	Limited series	
The Question: All Along the Watchtower		#1–6	Jan 2025 – Jun 2025	Limited series	
The Question Quarterly		#1–5	Autumn 1990 – Spring 1992		
The Question Returns		#1	Feb 1997	One-shot	
The Question: The Deaths of Vic Sage		#1–4	Jan 2020 – Oct 2020	Limited series; published under the DC Black Label imprint	

== R ==
Title	Series	Issues	Dates	Notes	Reference
R.E.B.E.L.S.	vol. 1	'94 #0–2	Oct 1994 – Dec 1994	Becomes R.E.B.E.L.S. '95	
R.E.B.E.L.S.	vol. 1	'95 #3–14	Jan 1995 – Dec 1995	Becomes R.E.B.E.L.S. '96	
R.E.B.E.L.S.	vol. 1	'96 #15–17	Jan 1996 – Mar 1996		
R.E.B.E.L.S.	vol. 2	#1–28	Feb 2009 – Jul 2011		
R.E.B.E.L.S.	vol. 2	Annual #1	2009		
The Raccoon Kids		#52–64	Sep/Oct 1954 – Nov 1957	Formerly Movietown's Animal Antics	
Ragman	vol. 1	#1–5	Aug/Sep 1976 – Jun/Jul 1977		
Ragman	vol. 2	#1–8	Oct 1991 – May 1992	Limited series	
Ragman	vol. 3	#1–6	Dec 2017 – May 2018	Limited series	
Ragman: Cry of the Dead		#1–6	Aug 1993 – Jan 1994	Limited series	
Ragman: Suit of Souls		#1	Dec 2010	One-shot	
Rainbow Brite and the Star Stealer			1986	One-shot movie adaptation	
Rann/Thanagar: Holy War		#1–8	May 2008 – Oct 2008	Limited series	
Rann-Thanagar War		#1–6	Jul 2005 – Dec 2005	Limited series	
Rann-Thanagar War	Infinite Crisis Special	#1	Apr 2006	One-shot	
The Ravagers		#0–12	Jul 2012 – Jul 2013	Issue #0 was published between #4 and #5	
Raven		#1–6	Nov 2016 – Apr 2017	Limited series	
Raven: Daughter of Darkness		#1–12	Mar 2018 – Mar 2019	Limited series	
The Ray	vol. 1	#1–6	Feb 1992 – Jul 1992	Limited series	
The Ray	vol. 2	#1–28	May 1994 – Oct 1996		
The Ray	vol. 2	#0	Oct 1994	Zero Hour tie-in	
The Ray	vol. 2	Annual #1	1995		
The Ray	vol. 3	#1–4	Feb 2012 – May 2012	Limited series	
Real Fact Comics		#1–21	Mar/Apr 1946 – Jul/Aug 1949		
Real Screen Comics		#2–128	Summer 1945 – May/Jun 1958	Formerly Real Screen Funnies; becomes TV Screen Cartoons	
Real Screen Funnies		#1	Spring 1945	Becomes Real Screen Comics	
Realworlds	Batman		2000	One-shot	
Realworlds	Justice League of America		2000	One-shot	
Realworlds	Superman		2000	One-shot	
Realworlds	Wonder Woman		2000	One-shot	
The Red Circle	The Hangman	#1	Oct 2009	One-shot	
The Red Circle	The Inferno	#1	Oct 2009	One-shot	
The Red Circle	The Shield	#1	Oct 2009	One-shot	
The Red Circle	The Web	#1	Oct 2009	One-shot	
Red Hood	vol. 1	#51–52	Jan 2021 – Feb 2021	Formerly Red Hood: Outlaw	
Red Hood	vol. 2	#1	Nov 2025	Series canceled after one issue; intended as on-going series	
Red Hood/Arsenal		#1–13	Aug 2015 – Aug 2016		
Red Hood and the Outlaws	vol. 1	#0–40	Sep 2011 – May 2015	Issue #0 was published between #12 and #13	
Red Hood and the Outlaws	vol. 1	Annual #1–2	2013 – 2015		
Red Hood and the Outlaws	vol. 1	Futures End #1	Nov 2014		
Red Hood and the Outlaws	vol. 2	#1–26	Oct 2016 – Nov 2018	Becomes Red Hood: Outlaw	
Red Hood and the Outlaws	vol. 2	Annual #1–2	2017 – 2018	Becomes Red Hood: Outlaw	
Red Hood and the Outlaws	vol. 2	Rebirth #1	Sep 2016	Becomes Red Hood: Outlaw	
Red Hood: Outlaw		#27–50	Dec 2018 – Dec 2020	Formerly Red Hood and the Outlaws vol. 2; becomes Red Hood	
Red Hood: Outlaw		Annual #3	2019	Formerly Red Hood and the Outlaws vol. 2; becomes Red Hood	
Red Hood: The Hill		#0–6	Apr 2024 – Sep 2024	Limited series	
Red Hood: The Lost Days		#1–6	Aug 2010 – Jan 2011	Limited series	
Red Lanterns		#0–40	Sep 2011 – May 2015	Issue #0 was published between #12 and #13	
Red Lanterns		Annual #1	2014		
Red Lanterns		Futures End #1	Nov 2014		
Red Robin		#1–26	Aug 2009 – Oct 2011		
Red Tornado	vol. 1	#1–4	Jul 1985 – Oct 1985	Limited series	
Red Tornado	vol. 2	#1–6	Nov 2009 – Apr 2010	Limited series	
Refrigerator Full of Heads		#1–6	Dec 2021 – Jun 2022	Limited series; published under the DC Black Label/Hill House Comics imprint	
Reign in Hell		#1–8	Sep 2008 – Feb 2009	Limited series	
Reign of the Zodiac		#1–8	Oct 2003 – May 2004		
Relative Heroes		#1–6	Mar 2000 – Aug 2000	Limited series	
Represent!		#1	Aug 2021	One-shot	
The Restaurant at the End of the Universe		#1–3	1994	Limited series; novel adaptation	
Resurrection Man	vol. 1	#1–27	May 1997 – Aug 1999		
Resurrection Man	vol. 1	#1,000,000	Nov 1998	DC One Million tie-in	
Resurrection Man	vol. 2	#0–12	Nov 2011 – Nov 2012	Issue #0 was published after #12 as final issue of series	
Resurrection Man: Quantum Karma		#1–6	Jun 2025 – Nov 2025	Limited series; published under the DC Black Label imprint	
The Return of Superman 30th Anniversary Special		#1	Dec 2023	One-shot	
Richard Dragon		#1–12	Jul 2004 – Jun 2005		
Richard Dragon, Kung-Fu Fighter		#1–18	Apr/May 1975 – Nov/Dec 1975		
The Riddler: Year of The Villain		#1	Nov 2019	One-shot	
The Riddler: Year One		#1–6	Dec 2022 – Oct 2023	Limited series; published under the DC Black Label imprint	
Rima the Jungle Girl		#1–7	Apr/May 1974 – Apr/May 1975		
The Ring of the Nibelung		#1–4	Dec 1989 – Mar 1990	Limited series	
Rip Hunter...Time Master		#1–29	Mar/Apr 1961 – Nov/Dec 1965		
Robin	vol. 1	#1–5	Jan 1991 – May 1991	Limited series	
Robin	vol. 2	#1–183	Nov 1993 – Apr 2009		
Robin	vol. 2	#0	Oct 1994	Zero Hour tie-in	
Robin	vol. 2	#1,000,000	Nov 1998	DC One Million tie-in	
Robin	vol. 2	80-Page Giant #1	Sep 2000		
Robin	vol. 2	Annual #1–7	1992 – 2007		
Robin	vol. 2	Plus #1–2	Dec 1996 – Dec 1997		
Robin	vol. 3	#1–17	Jun 2021 – Oct 2022		
Robin	vol. 3	2021 Annual	2021		
Robin II		#1–4	Oct 1991 – Dec 1991	Limited series; subtitled The Joker's Wild	
Robin III: Cry of the Huntress		#1–6	Dec 1992 – Mar 1993	Limited series	
Robin 80th Anniversary 100-Page Super Spectacular		#1	May 2020	One-shot	
Robin 3000		#1–2	Nov 1992 – Dec 1992	Elseworlds limited series	
Robin & Batman		#1–3	Jan 2022 – Mar 2022	Limited series	
Robin & Batman: Jason Todd		#1–3	Aug 2025 – Oct 2025	Limited series	
Robin/Argent Double-Shot		#1	Feb 1998	One-shot	
Robin Hood Tales		#7–14	Jan/Feb 1957 – Mar/Apr 1958	Continues from previous Quality Comics series	
Robin Rises	Alpha	#1	Feb 2015	One-shot	
Robin Rises	Omega	#1	Sep 2014	One-shot	
Robin: Son of Batman		#1–13	Aug 2015 – Aug 2016		
Robin/Spoiler Special		#1	Aug 2008	One-shot	
Robin War		#1–2	Feb 2016 – Mar 2016	Limited series	
Robin: Year One		#1–4	Dec 2000 – Mar 2001	Limited series	
Robins		#1–6	Jan 2022 – Jun 2022	Limited series	
Robotech Defenders		#1–2	Jan 1985 – Apr 1985	Limited series	
The Rocketeer/The Spirit: Pulp Friction		#1–4	Jul 2013 – Dec 2013	Limited series; co-published with IDW; also known as The Rocketeer & The Spirit: Pulp Friction	
Roger Zelazny's Amber: Nine Princes in Amber		#1–3	1996	Limited series; novel adaptation	
Roger Zelazny's Amber: The Guns of Avalon		#1–3	1996	Limited series; novel adaptation	
Rogues		#1–4	May 2022 – Dec 2022	Limited series; published under the DC Black Label imprint	
The Rogues (Villains)		#1	Feb 1998	One-shot; part of the New Year's Evil series	
Rogues Gallery			1996	One-shot	
Romance Trail		#1–6	Jul/Aug 1949 – May/Jun 1950		
Ronin		#1–6	Jul 1983 – Aug 1984	Limited series	
Roots of the Swamp Thing		#1–5	Jul 1986 – Nov 1986	Limited series	
Rorschach		#1–12	Dec 2020 – Nov 2021	Limited series; published under the DC Black Label imprint	
Rose & Thorn		#1–6	Feb 2004 – Jul 2004	Limited series	
Rudolph the Red-Nosed Reindeer		no numbers	1950 – 1962/3; 1972	13 annual issues from 1950; 1972 edition is tabloid sized	
The Ruff & Reddy Show		#1–6	Dec 2017 – May 2018	Limited series	
Rush City		#1–6	Sep 2006 – May 2007	Limited series	
RWBY		#1–7	Dec 2019 – Oct 2020	Limited series; print release of issue #7 canceled due to COVID-19 pandemic, though later included in trade paperback collection	
RWBY/Justice League		#1–7	Jun 2021 – Dec 2021	Limited series	

== S ==
Title	Series	Issues	Dates	Notes	Reference
S.T.A.R. Corps		#1–6	Nov 1993 – Apr 1994	Limited series	
The Saga of Ra's Al Ghul		#1–4	Jan 1988 – Apr 1988	Limited series	
The Saga of the Swamp Thing		#1–38	May 1982 – Feb 1986	Becomes Swamp Thing (vol. 2)	
The Saga of the Swamp Thing		Annual #1–2	1982 – 1985	Becomes Swamp Thing (vol. 2)	
Salvation Run		#1–7	Jan 2008 – Jul 2008	Limited series	
Samurai Jack Special			Sep 2002	One-shot	
The Sandman	vol. 1	#1–6	Winter 1974 – Dec/Jan 1975/6		
The Sandman	2nd series	#1–46	Jan 1989 – Feb 1993	Continued under the Vertigo imprint	
The Sandman	2nd series	Special #1	1991	Continued under the Vertigo imprint	
The Sandman Special		#1	Oct 2017	One-shot	
The Sandman: The Complete Shakespeare Collection		#1	Dec 2024	One-shot; published under the DC Black Label imprint	
The Sandman Universe: Dead Boy Detectives		#1–6	Feb 2023 – Jul 2023	Limited series; published under the DC Black Label imprint	
The Sandman Universe: Nightmare Country		#1–6	Jun 2022 – Nov 2022	Published under the DC Black Label imprint	
The Sandman Universe: Nightmare Country	The Glass House	#1–6	Jun 2023 – Feb 2024	Limited series; published under the DC Black Label imprint	
The Sandman Universe Presents Hellblazer		#1	Dec 2019	One-shot; published under the DC Black Label imprint	
The Sandman Universe Special: Thessaly		#1	Oct 2023	One-shot; published under the DC Black Label imprint	
Sasquatch Detective		#1	Feb 2019	One-shot	
The Savage Hawkman		#0–20	Nov 2011 – Jul 2013	Issue #0 was published between #12 and #13	
Scare Tactics		#1–12	Dec 1996 – Mar 1998		
Scarecrow (Villains)		#1	Feb 1998	One-shot; part of the New Year's Evil series	
Scarlett		#1–14	Jan 1993 – Feb 1994		
Science Fiction Graphic Novel		#1–7	1985 – 1987		
Scooby Apocalypse		#1–36	Jul 2016 – Jun 2019		
Scooby-Doo		#1–159	Aug 1997 – Oct 2010		
Scooby-Doo Spooky Spectacular		#1	Oct 1999	One-shot	
Scooby-Doo Spooky Spectacular	2000	#1	Oct 2000	One-shot	
Scooby-Doo Spooky Summer Special		#1	Aug 2001	One-shot	
Scooby-Doo Super Scarefest!		#1	Aug 2002	One-shot	
Scooby-Doo Team-Up		#1–50	Jan 2014 – Nov 2019		
Scooby-Doo: Where Are You?		#1–132	Nov 2010 – Apr 2025		
Scratch		#1–5	Aug 2004 – Dec 2004	Limited series	
Scribblenauts Unmasked: A Crisis of Imagination		#1–9	Mar 2014 – Nov 2014	Limited series; video game tie-in	
Scribbly		#1–15	Aug/Sep 1948 – Dec/Jan 1950/1951		
Sea Devils		#1–35	Sep/Oct 1961 – May/Jun 1967		
Secret Files & Origins Guide to the DC Universe	2000	#1	Mar 2000	One-shot	
Secret Files & Origins Guide to the DC Universe	2001-2002	#1	Feb 2002	One-shot	
Secret Files President Luthor		#1	Mar 2001	One-shot; also known as President Luthor Secret Files & Origins	
Secret Hearts		#1–153	Sep/Oct 1949 – Jul 1971		
Secret Origins	vol. 1	#1	Aug 1961	80-Page Giant One-shot	
Secret Origins	vol. 2	#1–7	Feb/Mar 1973 – Oct/Nov 1974		
Secret Origins	vol. 3	#1–50	Apr 1986 – Aug 1990		
Secret Origins	vol. 3	Annual #1–3	1987 – 1989		
Secret Origins	vol. 3	Special #1	1989		
Secret Origins	vol. 4	#1–11	Jun 2014 – May 2015		
Secret Origins 80-Page Giant		#1	Dec 1998	One-shot	
Secret Origins of Super-Villains 80-Page Giant		#1	Dec 1999	One-shot	
Secret Six	vol. 1	#1–7	Apr/May 1968 – Apr/May 1969		
Secret Six	vol. 2	#1–6	Jul 2006 – Jan 2007	Limited series	
Secret Six	vol. 3	#1–36	Nov 2008 – Oct 2011		
Secret Six	vol. 4	#1–14	Feb 2015 – Jul 2016		
Secret Six	vol. 5	#1–6	May 2025 – Oct 2025	Limited series	
Secret Society of Super-Villains		#1–15	May/Jun 1976 – Jun/Jul 1978		
The Secret Spiral of Swamp Kid			2019	Graphic novel; published under the DC Zoom imprint	
Secrets of Haunted House		#1–46	Apr/May 1975 – Mar 1982		
Secrets of Sinister House	vol. 1	#5–18	Jun/Jul 1972 – Jun/Jul 1974	Formerly Sinister House of Secret Love	
Secrets of Sinister House	vol. 2	#1	Dec 2019	One-shot	
Secrets of the Legion of Super-Heroes		#1–3	Jan 1981 – Mar 1981	Limited series	
Sensation Comics	vol. 1	#1–109	Jan 1942 – May/Jun 1952	Becomes Sensation Mystery	
Sensation Comics	vol. 2	#1	May 1999	One-shot; part of The Justice Society Returns! series	
Sensation Comics Featuring Wonder Woman		#1–17	Oct 2014 – Feb 2016		
Sensation Mystery		#110–116	Jul/Aug 1952 – Jul/Aug 1953	Formerly Sensation Comics	
Sensational Wonder Woman		#1–7	May 2021 – Nov 2021	Limited series	
Sensational Wonder Woman	Special	#1	May 2022	One-shot	
Sergeant Bilko		#1–18	May/Jun 1957 – Mar/Apr 1960		
Sergio Aragonés Destroys DC		#1	Jun 1996	One-shot	
Seven Soldiers		#0–1	Apr 2005 – Dec 2006	Limited series; also known as Seven Soldiers of Victory	
Seven Soldiers	Bulleteer	#1–4	Jan 2006 – May 2006	Limited series	
Seven Soldiers	Frankenstein	#1–4	Jan 2006 – May 2006	Limited series	
Seven Soldiers	Guardian	#1–4	May 2005 – Nov 2005	Limited series; cover logo reads The Manhattan Guardian	
Seven Soldiers	Klarion the Witch Boy	#1–4	Jun 2005 – Dec 2005	Limited series	
Seven Soldiers	Mister Miracle	#1–4	Nov 2005 – May 2006	Limited series	
Seven Soldiers	Shining Knight	#1–4	May 2005 – Oct 2005	Limited series	
Seven Soldiers	Zatanna	#1–4	Jun 2005 – Dec 2005	Limited series	
Sgt. Bilko's Pvt. Doberman		#1–11	Jun/Jul 1958 – Feb/Mar 1960		
Sgt. Rock	vol. 1	#302–422	Mar 1977 – Jul 1988	Formerly Our Army at War	
Sgt. Rock	vol. 1	Annual #2–4	1982 – 1984	Annual #1 was titled Sgt. Rock's Prize Battle Tales	
Sgt. Rock	vol. 2	#14–21	Jul 1991 – Feb 1992	Formerly Sgt. Rock Special (vol. 1)	
Sgt. Rock: Between Hell and a Hard Place			2003	Graphic novel	
Sgt. Rock Special	vol. 1	#1–13	Sep 1988 – Jun 1991	Becomes Sgt. Rock (vol. 2)	
Sgt. Rock Special	vol. 2	#1–2	Oct 1992 – 1994		
Sgt. Rock: The Lost Battalion		#1–6	Jan 2009 – Jun 2009	Limited series	
Sgt. Rock: The Prophecy		#1–6	Mar 2006 – Aug 2006	Limited series	
Sgt. Rock's Prize Battle Tales		#1	Mar 1964	80-Page Giant	
The Shade	vol. 1	#1–4	Apr 1997 – Jul 1997	Limited series	
The Shade	vol. 2	#1–12	Dec 2011 – Nov 2012	Limited series	
Shade, the Changing Girl		#1–12	Dec 2016 – Nov 2017	Limited series; published under the Young Animal pop-up imprint	
Shade, the Changing Girl/Wonder Woman Special		#1	Apr 2018	One-shot; published under the Young Animal pop-up imprint	
Shade, the Changing Man	vol. 1	#1–8	Jun/Jul 1977 – Aug/Sep 1978		
Shade, the Changing Man	vol. 2	#1–32	Jul 1990 – Feb 1993	Becomes Vertigo series	
Shade, the Changing Woman		#1–6	May 2018 – Oct 2018	Limited series; published under the Young Animal pop-up imprint	
Shado: Song of the Dragon		#1–4	Jan 1992 – Apr 1992	Limited series	
The Shadow	vol. 1	#1–12	Oct/Nov 1973 – Aug/Sep 1975		
The Shadow	vol. 2	#1–4	May 1986 – Aug 1986	Limited series	
The Shadow	vol. 3	#1–19	Aug 1987 – Jan 1989		
The Shadow	vol. 3	Annual #1–2	1987 – 1988		
The Shadow/Batman		#1–6	Oct 2017 – Mar 2018	Limited series; co-published with Dynamite Entertainment	
Shadow of the Batgirl			2020	Graphic novel	
Shadow of the Batman		#1–5	Dec 1985 – Apr 1985	Limited series	
The Shadow Strikes!		#1–31	Sep 1989 – May 1992		
The Shadow Strikes!		Annual #1	1989		
Shadow War	Alpha	#1	May 2022	One-shot	
Shadow War	Omega	#1	Jul 2022	One-shot	
The Shadow War of Hawkman		#1–4	May 1985 – Aug 1985	Limited series	
Shadow War Zone		#1	Jul 2022	One-shot	
Shadowdragon		Annual #1	Jul 1995	One-shot	
Shadowpact		#1–25	Jul 2006 – May 2008		
Shazam!	vol. 1	#1–35	Feb 1973 – May/Jun 1978	Issues #25–33 billed as DC-TV publications on covers	
Shazam!	vol. 2	#1	Mar 2011	One-shot	
Shazam!	vol. 3	#1–15	Feb 2019 – Nov 2020		
Shazam!	vol. 4	#1–4	Sep 2021 – Dec 2021	Limited series	
Shazam!	vol. 5	#1–21	Jul 2023 – May 2025		
Shazam! and the Shazam Family		Annual #1	2002	One-shot	
Shazam! Fury of the Gods Special: Shazamily Matters		#1	Apr 2023	One-shot	
Shazam! Power of Hope			2000	Graphic novel	
Shazam! The Monster Society of Evil		#1–4	Apr 2007 – Jul 2007	Limited series	
Shazam!: The New Beginning		#1–4	Apr 1987 – Jul 1987	Limited series	
Shazam! Thundercrack			2023	Graphic novel	
Sherlock Holmes		#1	Oct 1975	Canceled after first issue	
The Shield		#1–10	Nov 2009 – Aug 2010		
Showcase		#1–93	Mar/Apr 1956 – Sep 1970		
Showcase		#94–104	Aug/Sep 1977 – Sep 1978		
Showcase '93		#1–12	Jan 1993 – Dec 1993	Limited series	
Showcase '94		#1–12	Jan 1994 – Dec 1994	Limited series	
Showcase '95		#1–12	Jan 1995 – Dec 1995	Limited series	
Showcase '96		#1–12	Jan 1996 – Winter 1996	Limited series	
Sideways		#1–13	Apr 2018 – Apr 2019		
Sideways		Annual #1	Jan 2019		
The Silencer		#1–18	Mar 2018 – Aug 2019		
The Silencer		Annual #1	2018		
Silver Age		#1	Jul 2000	One-shot	
Silver Age	80-Page Giant	#1	Jul 2000	One-shot	
Silver Age	Challengers of the Unknown	#1	Jul 2000	One-shot	
Silver Age	Dial H for Hero	#1	Jul 2000	One-shot	
Silver Age	Doom Patrol	#1	Jul 2000	One-shot	
Silver Age	Green Lantern	#1	Jul 2000	One-shot	
Silver Age	Justice League of America	#1	Jul 2000	One-shot	
Silver Age	Secret Files	#1	Jul 2000	One-shot	
Silver Age	Showcase	#1	Jul 2000	One-shot	
Silver Age	Teen Titans	#1	Jul 2000	One-shot	
Silver Age	The Brave and the Bold	#1	Jul 2000	One-shot	
Silver Age	The Flash	#1	Jul 2000	One-shot	
Silver Surfer/Superman		#1	Nov 1996	One-shot; co-published with Marvel	
Silverblade		#1–12	Sep 1987 – Sep 1988		
Simon Dark		#1–18	Dec 2007 – May 2009		
Sinestro		#1–23	Jun 2014 – Jul 2016		
Sinestro		Annual #1	2015		
Sinestro		Futures End #1	Nov 2014		
Sinestro: Year of The Villain		#1	Oct 2019	one-shot	
The Sinister House of Secret Love		#1–4	Oct/Nov 1971 – Apr/May 1972	Becomes Secrets of Sinister House	
Sinister Sons		#1–6	Apr 2024 – Sep 2024	Limited Series	
Sins of Youth	Aquaboy & Lagoon Man	#1	May 2000	One-shot	
Sins of Youth	Batboy & Robin	#1	May 2000	One-shot	
Sins of Youth	JLA Jr.	#1	May 2000	One-shot	
Sins of Youth	Kid Flash & Impulse	#1	May 2000	One-shot	
Sins of Youth	Secret Files	#1	May 2000	One-shot; also known as Young Justice: Sins of Youth Secret Files	
Sins of Youth	Starwoman & The JSA Jr.	#1	May 2000	One-shot	
Sins of Youth	Superman, Jr. & Superboy, Sr.	#1	May 2000	One-shot	
Sins of Youth	The Secret & Deadboy	#1	May 2000	One-shot	
Sins of Youth	Wonder Girls	#1	May 2000	One-shot	
Sirens: Love Hurts		#1–4	Apr 2026 – Jul 2026	Limited series; published under the DC Black Label imprint	
Sixpack and Dogwelder: Hard Travelin' Heroz		#1–6	Oct 2016 – Mar 2017	Limited series	
Skreemer		#1–6	May 1989 – Oct 1989	Limited series	
Skull & Bones		#1–3	1992	Limited series	
Slash Maraud		#1–6	Nov 1987 – Apr 1988	Limited series	
Smallville		#1–11	May 2003 – Jan 2005		
Smallville: Alien		#1–4	Feb 2014 – May 2014	Limited series	
Smallville: Chaos		#1–4	Oct 2014 – Jan 2015	Limited series	
Smallville: Lantern		#1–4	Jun 2014 – Sep 2014	Limited series	
Smallville: Season 11		#1–19	Jul 2012 – Jan 2014		
Smallville: Season 11		Special #1–5	Jul 2013 – Sep 2014		
Smallville Season 11: Continuity		#1–4	Feb 2015 – May 2015	Limited series	
Smallville: The Comic		#1	Nov 2002	One-shot	
Smash Comics		#1	May 1999	One-shot; part of The Justice Society Returns! series. Named after a 1940s Quality Comic.	
Solo		#1–12	Dec 2004 – Oct 2006		
Solomon Grundy		#1–7	May 2009 – Nov 2009	Limited series	
Son of Ambush Bug		#1–6	Jul 1986 – Dec 1986	Limited series	
Son of Superman			1999	Elseworlds graphic novel	
Son of Vulcan		#1–6	Aug 2005 – Jan 2006	Limited series. An earlier series was published by Charlton Comics.	
Sonic Disruptors		#1–7	Dec 1987 – Jul 1988	12-issue limited series canceled after 7 issues	
Sovereign Seven		#1–36	Jul 1995 – Jul 1998		
Sovereign Seven		Annual #1–2	1995 – 1996		
Sovereign Seven		Plus #1	Feb 1997		
Space Ghost		#1–6	Jan 2005 – Jun 2005	Limited series	
Space Jam			Oct 1996	One-shot movie adaptation	
Space Jam: A New Legacy			2021	Graphic novel movie adaptation	
Spanner's Galaxy		#1–6	Dec 1984 – May 1985	Limited series	
Spawn/Batman			1994	One-shot; co-published with Image Comics	
The Spectre	vol. 1	#1–10	Dec 1967 – Jun 1969		
The Spectre	vol. 2	#1–31	Apr 1987 – Nov 1989		
The Spectre	vol. 2	Annual #1	1988		
The Spectre	vol. 3	#1–62	Dec 1992 – Feb 1998		
The Spectre	vol. 3	#0	Oct 1994	Zero Hour tie-in	
The Spectre	vol. 3	Annual #1	1995		
The Spectre	vol. 4	#1–27	Mar 2001 – May 2003		
Speed Force	vol. 1	#1	Nov 1997	One-shot	
Speed Force	vol. 2	#1–6	Jan 2024 – Jun 2024	Limited series	
Spelljammer		#1–15	Sep 1990 – Nov 1991	TSR	
Spider-Man and Batman			Sep 1995	One-shot; co-published with Marvel	
Spiral Zone		#1–4	Feb 1988 – May 1988		
The Spirit	vol. 1	#1–32	Feb 2007 – Oct 2009		
The Spirit	vol. 1	Special #1	Nov 2008		
The Spirit	vol. 2	#1–17	Jun 2010 – Aug 2011		
Spirit World		#1–6	Jul 2023 – Dec 2023	Limited series	
SpyBoy/Young Justice		#1–3	Feb 2002 – Apr 2002	Limited series; co-published with Dark Horse Comics	
Stalker		#1–4	Jun/Jul 1975 – Dec/Jan 1975/6		
Stanley and His Monster	vol. 1	#109–112	Apr/May 1968 – Oct/Nov 1968	Formerly The Fox and the Crow	
Stanley and His Monster	vol. 2	#1–4	Feb 1993 – May 1993	Limited series	
Star Hunters		#1–7	Oct/Nov 1977 – Oct/Nov 1978		
Star-Spangled Comics	vol. 1	#1–130	Oct 1941 – Jul 1952	Becomes Star Spangled War Stories	
Star-Spangled Comics	vol. 2	#1	May 1999	One-shot; part of The Justice Society Returns! series	
Star Spangled War Stories	vol. 1	#131–133	Aug 1952 – Oct 1952	Formerly Star-Spangled Comics	
Star Spangled War Stories	vol. 2	#3–204	Nov 1952 – Feb/Mar 1977	Re-numbered continuation of vol. 1; becomes Unknown Soldier	
Star Spangled War Stories	vol. 3	#1–8	Sep 2014 – May 2015		
Star Spangled War Stories	vol. 3	Futures End #1	Nov 2014		
Star-Spangled War Stories (War One-Shot)		#1	Nov 2010	One-shot	
Star Trek	vol. 1	#1–56	Feb 1984 – Nov 1988	Earlier series by Gold Key Comics and Marvel	
Star Trek	vol. 1	Annual #1–3	1985 – 1987		
Star Trek	vol. 2	#1–80	Oct 1989 – Feb 1996	Later series by Marvel and others	
Star Trek	vol. 2	Annual #1–6	1990 – 1996		
Star Trek	vol. 2	Special #1–3	1994 – 1995		
Star Trek VI: The Undiscovered Country		#1	1992	One-shot movie adaptation	
Star Trek: Debt of Honor			1992	Graphic novel	
Star Trek Generations			1994	One-shot movie adaptation	
Star Trek/Green Lantern	vol. 1	#1–6	Jul 2015 – Dec 2015	Limited series; co-published with IDW	
Star Trek/Green Lantern	vol. 2	#1–6	Dec 2016 – May 2017	Limited series; co-published with IDW	
Star Trek/Legion of Super-Heroes		#1–6	Oct 2011 – Mar 2012	Limited series; co-published with IDW	
Star Trek Movie Special		no number	1984	One-shot; adaptation of Star Trek III: The Search for Spock	
Star Trek Movie Special		#2	1987	One-shot; adaptation of Star Trek IV: The Voyage Home	
Star Trek Movie Special		#1	1989	One-shot; adaptation of Star Trek V: The Final Frontier	
Star Trek: The Ashes of Eden			1995	Graphic novel	
Star Trek: The Modala Imperative		#1–4	Jul 1991 – Sep 1991	Limited series	
Star Trek: The Next Generation	vol. 1	#1–6	Feb 1988 – Jul 1988		
Star Trek: The Next Generation	vol. 2	#1–80	Oct 1989 – Feb 1996		
Star Trek: The Next Generation	vol. 2	Annual #1–6	1990 – 1995		
Star Trek: The Next Generation	vol. 2	Special #1–3	1993 – 1995		
Star Trek: The Next Generation/Deep Space Nine		#1–2	Dec 1994 – Jan 1995	Limited series; crosses over with Malibu Comics' Star Trek: Deep Space Nine/The Next Generation	
Star Trek: The Next Generation—Ill Wind		#1–4	Nov 1995 – Feb 1996	Limited series	
Star Trek: The Next Generation—Shadowheart		#1–4	Dec 1994 – Mar 1995	Limited series	
Star Trek: The Next Generation: The Modala Imperative		#1–4	Sep 1991 – Oct 1991	Limited series	
Star Trek: The Next Generation—The Series Finale			1994	One-shot	
Starfire (1976)		#1–8	Aug/Sep 1976 – Oct/Nov 1977		
Starfire (2015)		#1–12	Aug 2015 – Jul 2016		
Stargirl Spring Break Special		#1	Jul 2021	One-shot	
Stargirl: The Lost Children		#1–6	Jan 2023 – Jul 2023	Limited series	
Starman	vol. 1	#1–45	Oct 1988 – Apr 1992		
Starman	vol. 2	#0–80	Oct 1994 – Aug 2001		
Starman	vol. 2	#81	Mar 2010	Blackest Night tie-in	
Starman	vol. 2	#1,000,000	Nov 1998	DC One Million tie-in	
Starman	vol. 2	80-Page Giant #1	Jan 1999		
Starman	vol. 2	Annual #1–2	1996 – 1997		
Starman	vol. 2	Secret Files #1	Apr 1998		
Starman/Congorilla		#1	Mar 2011	One-shot	
Starman: The Mist		#1	Jun 1998	One-shot; part of the GirlFrenzy! series	
Stars and S.T.R.I.P.E.		#0–14	Jul 1999 – Sep 2000		
Static: Season One		#1–6	Aug 2021 – May 2022	Limited series	
Static: Shadows of Dakota		#1–7	Apr 2023 – Jan 2024	Limited series	
Static Shock		#1–8	Nov 2011 – Jun 2012		
Static Shock: Rebirth of the Cool		#1–4	Jan 2001 – Sep 2001	Limited series	
Static Shock Special		#1	Aug 2011	One-shot	
Static Team-Up: Anansi		#1	Aug 2023	One-shot	
Static: Up All Night			2023	Graphic novel	
Steel	vol. 1	#1–52	Feb 1994 – Jul 1998		
Steel	vol. 1	#0	Oct 1994	Zero Hour tie-in	
Steel	vol. 1	Annual #1–2	1994 – 1995		
Steel	vol. 2	#1	Mar 2011	One-shot	
Steel, The Indestructible Man		#1–5	Mar 1978 – Oct/Nov 1978		
Steel: The Official Comic Adaptation of the Warner Bros. Motion Picture			Sep 1997	One-shot movie adaptation	
Steelworks		#1–6	Aug 2023 – Jan 2024	Limited series	
Stormwatch		#0–30	Nov 2011 – Jun 2014	Previous series published by WildStorm; issue #0 was published between #12 and #13	
Strange Adventures	vol. 1	#1–244	Aug/Sep 1950 – Oct/Nov 1973	vol. 2 published by Vertigo imprint	
Strange Adventures	vol. 3	#1–8	May 2009 – Dec 2009	Limited series	
Strange Adventures	vol. 4	#1–12	May 2020 – Dec 2021	Limited series; published under the DC Black Label imprint	
The Strange Case of Harleen and Harley			2024	Graphic novel	
Strange Love Adventures		#1	Apr 2022	One-shot	
Strange Sports Stories		#1–6	Sep/Oct 1973 – Jul/Aug 1974		
Street Fighter: The Battle for Shadaloo			Dec 1994	One-shot	
Streets		#1–3	1993	Limited series	
Sugar and Spike		#1–98	Apr/May 1956 – Oct/Nov 1971		
Sugar and Spike		#99	1992	Published as part of the DC Silver Age Classics series	
Suicide Squad	vol. 1	#1–66	May 1987 – Jun 1992		
Suicide Squad	vol. 1	#67	Mar 2010	Blackest Night tie-in	
Suicide Squad	vol. 1	Annual #1	1988		
Suicide Squad	vol. 2	#1–12	Nov 2001 – Oct 2002		
Suicide Squad	vol. 3	#0–30	Sep 2011 – Jul 2014	Issue #0 was published between #12 and #13	
Suicide Squad	vol. 4	#1–50	Oct 2016 – Mar 2019		
Suicide Squad	vol. 4	Annual #1	Oct 2018		
Suicide Squad	vol. 4	Rebirth #1	Oct 2016		
Suicide Squad	vol. 5	#1–11	Feb 2020 – Jan 2021		
Suicide Squad	vol. 6	#1–15	May 2021 – Jul 2022		
Suicide Squad	vol. 6	2021 Annual	2021		
Suicide Squad: Amanda Waller		#1	May 2014	One-shot	
Suicide Squad/Banana Splits Special		#1	May 2017	One-shot	
Suicide Squad Black Files		#1–6	Jan 2019 – Jun 2019	Limited series	
Suicide Squad: Blaze		#1–3	Apr 2022 – Sep 2022	Limited series; published under the DC Black Label imprint	
Suicide Squad: Dream Team		#1–4	May 2024 – Aug 2024	Limited series	
Suicide Squad: Get Joker!		#1–3	Oct 2021 – Jul 2022	Limited series; published under the DC Black Label imprint	
Suicide Squad: Kill Arkham Asylum		#1–5	Apr 2024 – Aug 2024	Limited series; video game tie-in	
Suicide Squad: King Shark		#1–6	Nov 2021 – Apr 2022	Limited series	
Suicide Squad Most Wanted: Deadshot & Katana		#1–6	Mar 2016 – Aug 2016	Limited series	
Suicide Squad Most Wanted: El Diablo &	Boomerang	#1–2	Oct 2016 – Nov 2016	Limited series	
Suicide Squad Most Wanted: El Diablo &	Killer Croc	#3–4	Dec 2016 – Jan 2017	Limited series	
Suicide Squad Most Wanted: El Diablo &	Amanda Waller	#5–6	Feb 2017 – Mar 2017	Limited series	
Suicide Squad: Raise the Flag		#1–8	Nov 2007 – Jun 2008	Limited series	
Suicide Squad Special: War Crimes		#1	Oct 2016	One-shot	
Summer of Supergirl Special		#1	Aug 2026	One-shot	
Summer of Superman Special		#1	Jun 2025	One-shot	
Sun Devils		#1–12	Jul 1984 – Jun 1985	Limited series	
Super DC Giant		#S-13–S-26	Sep/Oct 1970 – Jul/Aug 1971	No issues #S-1–S-12	
Super DC Giant		#27	Summer 1976	No issues #S-1–S-12	
Super Friends	vol. 1	#1–47	Nov 1976 – Aug 1981		
Super Friends	vol. 2	#1–29	May 2008 – Sep 2010		
Super-Pets Special: Bitedentity Crisis		#1	Sep 2024	One-shot	
Super Powers	vol. 1	#1–5	Jul 1984 – Nov 1984	Limited series	
Super Powers	vol. 2	#1–6	Sep 1985 – Feb 1986	Limited series	
Super Powers	vol. 3	#1–4	Sep 1986 – Dec 1986	Limited series	
Super Powers	vol. 4	#1–6	Jan 2017 – Jun 2017	Limited series	
Super Soldier		#1	Apr 1996	One-shot; published under the Amalgam Comics imprint in association with Marvel	
Super Soldier: Man of War		#1	Jun 1997	One-shot; published under the Amalgam Comics imprint in association with Marvel	
Super Sons		#1–16	Apr 2017 – Jul 2018		
Super Sons		Annual #1	Jan 2018		
Super Sons/Dynomutt Special		#1	Jul 2018	One-shot	
Super Sons: Escape to Landis			2020	Graphic novel	
Super Sons: The Foxglove Mission			2019	Graphic novel; published under the DC Zoom imprint	
Super Sons: The Polarshield Project			2019	Graphic novel; published under the DC Zoom imprint	
Superboy	vol. 1	#1–230	Mar/Apr 1949 – Aug 1977	Becomes Superboy and the Legion of Super-Heroes	
Superboy	vol. 1	Annual #1	Summer 1964		
Superboy	vol. 2	#1–17	Feb 1990 – Jun 1991	Becomes Adventures of Superboy. Adaptation of the TV series	
Superboy	vol. 3	#1–100	Feb 1994 – Jul 2002		
Superboy	vol. 3	#0	Oct 1994	Zero Hour tie-in	
Superboy	vol. 3	#1,000,000	Nov 1998	DC One Million tie-in	
Superboy	vol. 3	Annual #1–4	1994 – 1997		
Superboy	vol. 3	Plus #1–2	Jan 1997 – Fall 1997		
Superboy	vol. 4	#1–11	Jan 2011 – Oct 2011		
Superboy	vol. 5	#0–34	Nov 2011 – Oct 2014	Issue #0 was published between #12 and #13	
Superboy	vol. 5	Annual #1	Mar 2013		
Superboy	vol. 5	Futures End #1	Nov 2014		
Superboy and the Legion of Super-Heroes		#231–258	Sep 1977 – Dec 1979	Formerly Superboy (vol. 1); becomes The Legion of Super-Heroes (vol. 2 )	
Superboy and the Ravers		#1–19	Sep 1996 – Mar 1998		
Superboy/Risk Double-Shot		#1	Feb 1998	One-shot	
Superboy/Robin: World's Finest Three		#1–2	1996 – 1997	Limited series	
Superboy Spectacular		#1	1980	One-shot	
Superboy: The Man of Tomorrow		#1–6	Jun 2023 – Nov 2023	Limited series	
Superboy's Legion		#1–2	Apr 2001 – May 2001	Elseworlds limited series	
Supergirl	vol. 1	#1–10	Nov 1972 – Sep/Oct 1974		
Supergirl	vol. 2	#14–23	Dec 1983 – Sep 1984	Formerly Daring New Adventures of Supergirl	
Supergirl	vol. 3	#1–4	Feb 1994 – May 1994	Limited series	
Supergirl	vol. 4	#1–80	Sep 1996 – May 2003		
Supergirl	vol. 4	#1,000,000	Nov 1998	DC One Million tie-in	
Supergirl	vol. 4	Annual #1–2	1996 – 1997		
Supergirl	vol. 4	Plus #1	Feb 1997		
Supergirl	vol. 5	#0–67	Oct 2005 – Oct 2011		
Supergirl	vol. 5	Annual #1–2	2009 – 2010		
Supergirl	vol. 6	#0–40	Nov 2011 – May 2015	Issue #0 was published between #12 and #13	
Supergirl	vol. 6	Futures End #1	Nov 2014		
Supergirl	vol. 7	#1–42	Nov 2016 – Aug 2020	Issues #41 & 42 released digitally-only	
Supergirl	vol. 7	Annual #1–2	2017 – 2019		
Supergirl	vol. 7	Rebirth #1	Oct 2016		
Supergirl	vol. 8	#1–	Jul 2025 – present		
Supergirl and the Legion of Super-Heroes		#16–37	May 2006 – Feb 2008	Formerly Legion of Super-Heroes (vol. 5); becomes Legion of Super-Heroes (vol. 5). Cover logo changes with #37, but indicia title only changes with #38.	
Supergirl: Being Super		#1–4	Feb 2017 – Aug 2017	Limited series	
Supergirl: Cosmic Adventures in the 8th Grade		#1–6	Feb 2009 – Jul 2009	Limited series	
Supergirl/Lex Luthor Special		#1	1993	One-shot; also known as Supergirl and Team Luthor	
Supergirl Movie Special		#1	1985	One-shot movie adaptation	
Supergirl/Prysm Double-Shot		#1	Feb 1998	One-shot	
Supergirl Special		#1	Dec 2023	One-shot	
Supergirl: Survive		#1–6	Aug 2026 – present	Elseworlds limited series	
Supergirl: The World			2026	Graphic novel	
Supergirl: Wings			Dec 2001	Elseworlds one-shot	
Supergirl: Woman of Tomorrow		#1–8	Aug 2021 – Apr 2022	Limited series	
Supergirl's Family Vacation			2026	Graphic novel	
Supergirl's Zoo-per Heroes: Krypto's Big Break			2026	Graphic novel	
Super-Heroes Battle Super-Gorillas		#1	Winter 1976	One-shot	
Superman	vol. 1	#1–423	Summer 1939 – Sep 1986	Becomes Adventures of Superman	
Superman	vol. 1	Annual #1–8, 9–12	1960 – 1963; 1983 – 1986	Becomes Adventures of Superman	
Superman	vol. 1	Special #1–3	1983 – 1985	Becomes Adventures of Superman	
Superman	vol. 2	#1–226	Jan 1987 – Apr 2006		
Superman	vol. 2	#0	Oct 1994	Zero Hour tie-in	
Superman	vol. 2	#1,000,000	Nov 1998	DC One Million tie-in	
Superman	vol. 2	80-Page Giant #1–3	1999 – 2000		
Superman	vol. 2	Annual #1–12	1987 – 2000		
Superman	vol. 2	Plus #1	Feb 1997		
Superman	vol. 2	Secret Files #1–2	1998 – 1999		
Superman	vol. 2	Special #1	1992		
Superman	vol. 3	#650–714	May 2006 – Oct 2011	Formerly Adventures of Superman	
Superman	vol. 3	80-Page Giant #1	May 2010	Formerly Adventures of Superman	
Superman	vol. 3	80-Page Giant 2011 #1	Apr 2011	Formerly Adventures of Superman	
Superman	vol. 3	Annual #13–14	2007 – 2008	Formerly Adventures of Superman	
Superman	vol. 3	Secret Files 2009	2009	Formerly Adventures of Superman	
Superman	vol. 4	#0–52	Nov 2011 – Aug 2016	Issue #0 was published between #12 and #13	
Superman	vol. 4	#23.1–23.4	Nov 2013	Forever Evil tie-ins	
Superman	vol. 4	Annual #1–3	2012; 2013; 2016		
Superman	vol. 4	Futures End #1	Nov 2014		
Superman	vol. 5	#1–45	Aug 2016 – Jun 2018		
Superman	vol. 5	Annual #1	2017		
Superman	vol. 5	Rebirth #1	Aug 2016		
Superman	vol. 5	Special #1	Jul 2018		
Superman	vol. 6	#1–32	Sep 2018 – Aug 2021		
Superman	vol. 7	#1–	Apr 2023 – present		
Superman	vol. 7	2023 Annual #1	2023		
Superman	vol. 7	Superman 2026 Annual: Year One Thousand #1	2026		
Superman 3-D		#1	Dec 1998	One-shot	
Superman IV Movie Special		#1	1987	One-shot movie adaptation	
Superman '78		#1–6	Oct 2021 – Mar 2022	Limited series	
Superman '78	The Metal Curtain	#1–6	Jan 2024 – Jun 2024	Limited series	
Superman: A Nation Divided			Feb 1999	Elseworlds one-shot	
Superman Adventures		#1–66	Nov 1996 – Apr 2002	Takes place in the DC Animated Universe	
Superman Adventures		Annual #1	1997	Takes place in the DC Animated Universe	
Superman Adventures		Special #1	Feb 1998	Takes place in the DC Animated Universe	
Superman/Aliens 2: God War		#1–4	May 2002 – Aug 2002	Limited series; co-published with Dark Horse Comics	
Superman: American Alien		#1–7	Jan 2016 – Jul 2016	Limited series	
Superman & Batman: Generations		#1–4	Jan 1999 – Apr 1999	Elseworlds limited series	
Superman & Batman: Generations II		#1–4	Oct 2001 – Jan 2002	Elseworlds limited series	
Superman & Batman: Generations III		#1–12	Mar 2003 – Feb 2004	Elseworlds limited series	
Superman and Batman vs. Aliens and Predator		#1–2	2007	Limited series; co-published with Dark Horse Comics	
Superman and Batman vs. Vampires and Werewolves		#1–6	Dec 2008 – Feb 2009	Limited series	
Superman and Batman: World's Funnest			2000	Elseworlds one-shot	
Superman & Bugs Bunny		#1–4	Jul 2000 – Oct 2000	Limited series	
Superman & Robin Special		#1	Mar 2022	One-shot	
Superman & Savage Dragon: Chicago			Dec 2002	One-shot; co-published with Image Comics	
Superman & Savage Dragon: Metropolis			Nov 1999	One-shot; co-published with Image Comics	
Superman and Spider-Man		#1	1981	Issue #28 of Marvel Treasury Edition; co-published with Marvel	
Superman and the Authority		#1–4	Sep 2021 – Dec 2021	Limited series	
Superman: At Earth's End			1995	Elseworlds one-shot	
Superman/Batman		#1–87	Oct 2003 – Aug 2011		
Superman/Batman		Annual #1–5	2006 – 2011		
Superman/Batman		Secret Files #1	Nov 2003		
Superman Beyond		#0	Oct 2011	One-shot	
Superman: Birthright		#1–12	Sep 2003 – Sep 2004	Limited series	
Superman: Blood of My Ancestors			2003	One-shot	
Superman: Chains of Love Special		#1	Apr 2026	One-shot	
Superman Confidential		#1–14	Jan 2007 – Jun 2008		
Superman: Day of Doom		#1–4	Jan 2003 – Feb 2003	Limited series	
Superman: Distant Fires			Feb 1998	Elseworlds one-shot	
Superman: Doomed		#1–2	Jul 2014 – Nov 2014	Limited series	
Superman/Doomsday: Hunter/Prey		#1–3	Apr 1994 – Jun 1994	Limited series	
Superman: Earth One	vol. 1		2010	Graphic novel	
Superman: Earth One	vol. 2		2012	Graphic novel	
Superman: Earth One	vol. 3		2015	Graphic novel	
Superman: Emperor Joker		#1	Oct 2000	One-shot	
Superman: End of the Century			2000	Graphic novel	
Superman: Endless Winter Special		#1	Feb 2021	One-shot	
The Superman Family		#164–222	May 1974 – Sep 1982	Formerly Superman's Pal Jimmy Olsen	
Superman Family Adventures		#1–12	Jul 2012 – Jun 2013		
Superman/Fantastic Four			Apr 1999	One-shot; co-published with Marvel	
Superman: Father of Tomorrow		#1–6	Jul 2026 – Dec 2026	Elseworlds limited series	
Superman For All Seasons		#1–4	Sep 1998 – Dec 1998	Limited series	
Superman for Earth			1991	One-shot	
Superman For The Animals		#1	Jan 2000	One-shot	
Superman Forever		#1	Jun 1998	One-shot	
The Superman Gallery		#1	Feb 1993	One-shot	
Superman/Gen 13		#1–3	Jun 2000 – Aug 2000	Limited series; WildStorm crossover	
Superman: Heroes		#1	Apr 2020	One-shot	
Superman: House of Brainiac Special		#1	Jun 2024	One-shot	
Superman, Inc.			Jan 2000	Elseworlds one-shot	
Superman: Infinite City			2005	Graphic novel	
Superman: Kal			1995	Elseworlds one-shot	
Superman: Kal-El Returns Special		#1	Jan 2023	One-shot	
Superman: King of the World		#1	Jun 1999	One-shot	
Superman: Kingdom of Zod Special		#1	Nov 2026	One-shot	
Superman: Last Son of Earth		#1–2	Sep 2000 – Oct 2000	Elseworlds limited series	
Superman: Last Stand of New Krypton		#1–3	May 2010 – Jun 2010	Limited series	
Superman: Last Stand on Krypton			2003	Elseworlds one-shot	
Superman: Leviathan Rising Special		#1	Jul 2019	One-shot	
Superman: Lex 2000		#1	Jan 2001	One-shot	
Superman: Lex Luthor Special		#1	Mar 2025	One-shot	
Superman: Lois & Clark		#1–8	Dec 2015 – Jul 2016	Limited series	
Superman: Lois Lane (1998)		#1	Jun 1998	One-shot; part of the GirlFrenzy! series	
Superman: Lois Lane (2014)		#1	Apr 2014	One-shot	
Superman: Lost		#1–10	May 2023 – Mar 2024	Limited series	
The Superman/Madman Hullabaloo		#1–3	Jun 1997 – Aug 1997	Limited series; co-published with Dark Horse Comics	
Superman: Metropolis		#1–12	Apr 2003 – Mar 2004	Limited series	
Superman Metropolis Secret Files		#1	Jun 2000	One-shot	
The Superman Monster			1999	Elseworlds one-shot	
The Superman Movie Special		#1	Sep 1983	One shot movie adaptation	
Superman: New Krypton Special		#1	Dec 2008	One-shot	
Superman of Smallville			2019	Graphic novel; published under the DC Zoom imprint	
Superman: Our Worlds at War Secret Files and Origins		#1	Aug 2001	One-shot	
Superman: Peace on Earth			1999	Graphic novel	
Superman Red & Blue		#1–6	May 2021 – Oct 2021	Limited series	
Superman Red & Blue 2025 Special		#1	Dec 2025	One-shot	
Superman: Red Son		#1–3	Aug 2003 – Oct 2003	Elseworlds limited series	
Superman Red/Superman Blue		#1	Feb 1998	One-shot	
Superman Returns Prequel		#1–4	Aug 2006	Limited series	
Superman Returns: The Official Movie Adaptation			Sep 2006	One-shot movie adaptation	
Superman: Save the Planet		#1	Oct 1998	One-shot	
Superman: Secret Files 2009		#1	Oct 2009	One-shot	
Superman Secret Files and Origins	2004		Aug 2004	One-shot	
Superman Secret Files and Origins	2005		Jan 2006	One-shot	
Superman: Secret Identity		#1–4	Jan 2004 – Apr 2004	Limited series	
Superman: Secret Origin		#1–6	Nov 2009 – Apr 2010	Limited series	
Superman/Shazam: First Thunder		#1–4	Nov 2005 – Feb 2006	Limited series	
Superman: Silver Banshee		#1–2	Dec 1998 – Jan 1999	Limited series	
Superman Smashes The Klan		#1–3	Dec 2019 – Apr 2020	Limited series	
Superman: Son of Kal-El		#1–18	Sep 2021 – Feb 2023		
Superman: Son of Kal-El		2021 Annual	2021		
Superman: Space Age		#1–3	Sep 2022 – Apr 2023	Limited series	
Superman Spectacular			1982	One-shot	
Superman: Speeding Bullets			1993	Elseworlds one-shot	
Superman: Strength		#1–3	2005	Limited series	
Superman/Supergirl: Maelstrom		#1–5	Jan 2009 – Mar 2009	Limited series	
Superman/Tarzan: Sons of the Jungle		#1–3	Oct 2001 – May 2002	Elseworlds limited series; co-published with Dark Horse Comics	
Superman: The 10-Cent Adventure		#1	Mar 2003	One-shot	
Superman: The Coming of the Supermen		#1–6	Apr 2016 – Sep 2016	Limited series	
Superman: The Dark Side		#1–3	Oct 1998 – Dec 1998	Elseworlds limited series	
Superman: The Doomsday Wars		#1–3	Oct 1998 – Dec 1998	Limited series	
Superman: The Earth Stealers			May 1988	One-shot	
Superman: The Harvests of Youth			2023	Graphic novel	
Superman: The Kansas Sighting		#1–2	Nov 2003 – Dec 2003	Limited series	
Superman: The Kryptonite Spectrum		#1–5	Oct 2025 – Feb 2026	Limited series; published under the DC Black Label imprint	
Superman: The Last Days of Lex Luthor		#1–3	Sep 2023 – Jun 2025	Limited series; published under the DC Black Label imprint	
Superman: The Last Family of Krypton		#1–3	Oct 2010 – Dec 2010	Elseworlds limited series	
Superman: The Last God of Krypton			Aug 1999	One-shot	
Superman: The Legacy of Superman		#1	Mar 1993	One-shot	
Superman: The Man of Steel		#1–134	Jul 1991 – Mar 2003		
Superman: The Man of Steel		#0	Oct 1994	Zero Hour tie-in	
Superman: The Man of Steel		#1,000,000	Nov 1998	DC One Million tie-in	
Superman: The Man of Steel		Annual #1–6	1992 – 1997		
Superman: The Man of Steel		Gallery #1	Dec 1995		
Superman: The Man of Tomorrow		#1–15	Summer 1995 – Fall 1999		
Superman: The Man of Tomorrow		#1,000,000	Nov 1998	DC One Million tie-in	
Superman: The Odyssey			Jul 1999	One-shot	
Superman: The Secret Years		#1–4	Feb 1985 – May 1985	Limited series	
Superman: The Stranger		#1–6	Nov 2026 – present	Limited series; published under the DC Black Label imprint	
Superman: The Wedding Album		#1	Dec 1996	One-shot	
Superman: The Wedding Album 30th Anniversary Special		#1	Dec 2026	One-shot	
Superman: The World			2025	Graphic novel	
Superman/ThunderCats		#1	Jan 2004	One-shot; WildStorm crossover	
Superman/Top Cat Special		#1	Dec 2018	One-shot	
Superman/Toyman		#1	Jan 1996	One-shot	
Superman Treasury 2025: Hero for All		#1	Sep 2025	One-shot	
Superman: True Brit			2004	Elseworlds graphic novel	
Superman Unchained		#1–9	Aug 2013 – Jan 2015	Limited series	
Superman: Under a Yellow Sun			1994	One-shot	
Superman Unlimited		#1–	Jul 2025 – present		
Superman: Up in the Sky		#1–6	Sep 2019 – Feb 2020	Limited series	
Superman vs. Aliens		#1–3	Jul 1995 – Sep 1995	Limited series; co-published with Dark Horse Comics	
Superman vs. Darkseid: Apokolips Now!		#1	Mar 2003	One-shot	
Superman vs. Lobo		#1–3	Oct 2021 – May 2022	Limited series; published under the DC Black Label imprint	
Superman vs. Predator		#1–3	May 2000 – Jul 2000	Limited series; co-published with Dark Horse Comics	
Superman vs. The Amazing Spider-Man			1976	Tabloid size one-shot; co-published with Marvel	
Superman vs. The Terminator: Death to the Future		#1–4	Dec 1999 – Mar 2000	Limited series; co-published with Dark Horse Comics	
Superman: Villains		#1	May 2020	One-shot	
Superman Villains Secret Files		#1	Jun 1998	One-shot	
Superman: War of the Supermen		#0–4	Jun 2010 – Jul 2010	Weekly limited series	
Superman: War of the Worlds			1998	Elseworlds one-shot	
Superman: Warworld Apocalypse		#1	Oct 2022	One-shot	
Superman: Where Is Thy Sting?			2001	One-shot	
Superman/Wonder Woman		#1–31	Dec 2013 – Jul 2016; Dec 2016	Previously unreleased issues #30 & 31 published in collection Volume 5: A Savage End	
Superman/Wonder Woman		Annual #1–2	2014; 2016		
Superman/Wonder Woman		Futures End #1	Nov 2014		
Superman/Wonder Woman: Whom Gods Destroy		#1–4	Dec 1996 – Mar 1997	Elseworlds limited series	
Superman: World of New Krypton		#1–12	Mar 2009 – Apr 2010	Limited series	
Superman: Y2K		#1	Feb 2000	One-shot	
Superman: Year One		#1–3	Aug 2019 – Dec 2019	Limited series; published under the DC Black Label imprint	
Superman's Girl Friend, Lois Lane		#1–137	Mar/Apr 1958 – Sep/Oct 1974		
Superman's Good Guy Gang			2025	Graphic novel	
Superman's Good Guy Gang: Follow the Leader			2026	Graphic novel	
Superman's Metropolis			Jan 1997	Elseworlds one-shot	
Superman's Nemesis: Lex Luthor		#1–4	Mar 1999 – Jun 1999	Limited series	
Superman's Pal Jimmy Olsen	vol. 1	#1–163	Sep/Oct 1954 – Feb/Mar 1974	Becomes The Superman Family	
Superman's Pal Jimmy Olsen	vol. 2	#1–12	Sep 2019 – Sep 2020	Limited series	
Superman's Pal Jimmy Olsen Special		#1–2	Dec 2008 – Oct 2009		
Superman's Pal Jimmy Olsen's Boss Perry White		#1	Aug 2022	One-shot	
Supermen of America	vol. 1	#1	Mar 1999	One-shot	
Supermen of America	vol. 2	#1–6	Mar 2000 – Aug 2000	Limited series	
Supernatural		#1–6	Dec 2011 – May 2012	Limited series	
Super-Team Family		#1–15	Oct/Nov 1975 – Mar/Apr 1978		
Superwoman		#1–18	Oct 2016 – Mar 2018		
Superwoman Special		#1	Feb 2025	One-shot	
Swamp Thing	vol. 1	#1–24	Oct/Nov 1972 – Aug/Sep 1976		
Swamp Thing	vol. 2	#39–128	Mar 1986 – Feb 1993	Formerly Saga of the Swamp Thing; published under the Vertigo imprint from issue #129 on (as well as vols. 3 and 4)	
Swamp Thing	vol. 2	Annual #3–6	1987 – 1989; 1991	Formerly Saga of the Swamp Thing; published under the Vertigo imprint from issue #129 on (as well as vols. 3 and 4)	
Swamp Thing	vol. 5	#0–40	Nov 2011 – May 2015	Issue #0 was published between #12 and #13	
Swamp Thing	vol. 5	#23.1	Nov 2013	Forever Evil tie-in	
Swamp Thing	vol. 5	Annual #1–3	2012 – 2014		
Swamp Thing	vol. 5	Futures End #1	Nov 2014		
Swamp Thing	vol. 6	#1–6	Mar 2016 – Aug 2016	Limited series	
Swamp Thing	vol. 7	#1–16	May 2021 – Feb 2022; May 2022 – Oct 2022	Limited series; titled The Swamp Thing	
Swamp Thing 1989		#1–4	Jun 2026 – Sep 2026	Limited series	
Swamp Thing: Green Hell		#1–3	Feb 2022 – May 2023	Limited series; published under the DC Black Label imprint	
Swamp Thing: Twin Branches			2020	Graphic novel	
Swamp Thing Winter Special		#1	Mar 2018	One-shot	
Sweatshop		#1–6	Jun 2003 – Nov 2003	Limited series	
Sweet Tooth: The Return		#1–6	Jan 2021 – Jun 2021	Limited series; published under the DC Black Label imprint; previous volume published under the Vertigo imprint	
Swing with Scooter		#1–35	Jun/Jul 1966 – Aug/Sep 1971		
Swing with Scooter		#36	Oct/Nov 1972		
Sword of Azrael		#1–6	Oct 2022 – Mar 2023	Limited series	
Sword of Azrael	Dark Knight of the Soul	#1	Oct 2022	One-shot	
Sword of Sorcery	vol. 1	#1–5	Feb/Mar 1973 – Nov/Dec 1973		
Sword of Sorcery	vol. 2	#0–8	Nov 2012 – Jul 2013		
Sword of The Atom		#1–4	Sep 1983 – Dec 1983	Limited series	
Sword of The Atom		Special #1–3	1984; 1985; 1988		

== See also ==
- List of current DC Comics publications
- List of DC Comics reprint collections
- List of DC Archive Editions
- List of DC Comics imprint publications
- List of Elseworlds publications
- List of DC Comics characters

DC Comics has also published titles under other imprints (chiefly Vertigo, Milestone, WildStorm, ABC, Paradox Press, Amalgam, DC Focus, Johnny DC, Tangent, CMX, Impact, Helix, Minx, and Homage) along with a number of reprints.
