= Superman: Last Stand on Krypton =

- Cover to Superman: Last Stand on Krypton, art by Doug Wheatley

Publication information
- Publisher: DC Comics
- Format: One-shot
- Genre: Superhero
- Publication date: 2003
- No. of issues: 1
- Main character(s): Superman; Lois Lane; General Zod; Lex Luthor

Creative team
- Written by: Steve Gerber
- Artist: Doug Wheatley
- Colorist: Chris Chuckry

Superman: Last Stand on Krypton is a comic book Elseworlds story, published by DC Comics in 2003. Written by Steve Gerber with art by Doug Wheatley, the book is the sequel to the comic book Superman: Last Son of Earth, also by Gerber and Wheatley. Last Stand on Krypton picks up 10 years after Last Son of Earth. Earth has thrived thanks to Superman and Kryptonian technology, but Lex Luthor now threatens Krypton.

== Plot ==
In 2000, Earth has been hit with an asteroid, Superman, using Kryptonian technology, hopes to bring Earth back to its potential. In 2011, Metropolis is a paradise, but the government is corrupt. In a council meeting Superman refuses to share more Kryptonian technology, fearing Earth would suffer the same fate as Krypton. At the Daily Planet, Superman seeks the advice of Perry White, who tells him to check on Lois Lane, who is now a Captain in the military and is doing work in South America. Jimmy Olsen asks Superman about Morgan Edge calling him a traitor to humanity. At the Arkham Island, Lex Luthor bargains with Morgan Edge for freedom, and vows to take Superman down. Edge says that Superman has disappeared, Luthor tells Edge that he's the only one who could find Superman and destroy him.

Meanwhile, Superman comes out of warp near Krypton, finds Jor-El and Lara and has a happy family reunion. On Krypton Zod has takes up the mantle of General again, to defend the true Kryptonian heritage. Superman is informed how Zod would have the land reduced to a barren waste, rather than using the cloning tech to restore Krypton to its former glory. Somewhere on Krypton a spaceship crashes on the planet, Lois and Luthor in his exo-suit comes out. Robots attacks Luthor and the two are brought before Zod. Zod questions Luthor and finds out Superman is on the planet and Luthor agrees to help him. Zod's robots descend upon the New Kryptonian sanctuary, where the colonists are infected with Kryptonium, a.k.a. the green death. The animals and people in the colony die horribly. Superman pleads with Zod to avoid war, but Zod declines, and hands him over to Luthor, who infects Superman with forms of the green death, which turns him into a brutish being in the process. Superman is thus rendered animalistic and unintelligible, but his motives are still pure. He takes Lois to his father, and Lois tells Jor-El that she will run his war for him.

Zod finds he has no more use for Luthor and is about to attack him, when Lex turns a red energy ray on himself. Luthor informs Zod that he now has sufficient brainpower to control Zod's army, and order Zod's soldiers to attack Zod. Luthor then gathers Zod's army to him and marches upon the colony. Lois initiates phase three using the Phantom Zone on Luthor's troops. Despite the loss of his armies, Luthor is still able to bring down the spire Superman is in. He then tries to control Superman's will but is unable to do so. They are enveloped in an energy field of their mental projection and an explosion ensues. Both burned beyond recognition and dying, Luthor tells Superman that a madman's work is never done, and unhinges Krypton. Superman tries to warn his family to leave. Lara, Jor-El and Lois run to Jor-El's lab and find a spaceship with a hyperdrive. There is only enough room for Lois and Lara, and Jor-El sends them on the spaceship as Krypton explodes. Lara reveals to Lois that she is pregnant with Jor-El's child.

== Publication ==
- Superman: Last Stand on Krypton (paperback 68 page, March 2003)

== See also ==
- Superman: Last Son of Earth
- List of Elseworlds publications
