= Joanne Siegel =

American model (1917–2011)

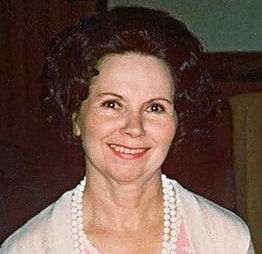
- Siegel in 1976
- Born: Jolan Kovacs; December 1, 1917; Cleveland, Ohio, U.S.
- Died: February 12, 2011 (aged 93); Santa Monica, California, U.S.
- Other names: Joanne Carter
- Spouse: Jerry Siegel (m. 1948; died 1996)
- Children: 1

Joanne Siegel (/ˈsiːɡəl/ SEE-gəl; born Jolan Kovacs; December 1, 1917 – February 12, 2011) was an American model, who in the 1930s worked with Superman artist Joe Shuster as the model for Lois Lane, Superman's love interest. She later married Superman's co-creator Jerry Siegel and sued for restoration of her husband's authorship copyright in the Superman character.

== Life and career ==
Siegel was born in Cleveland, Ohio, in 1917, the daughter of Hungarian immigrants. In 1935, while still attending high school, she placed an advertisement in Cleveland's The Plain Dealer offering her services as a model. The ad stated: "Situation Wanted — Female ARTIST MODEL: No experience." Joe Shuster, who was working on a new comic character, Superman, responded to the ad. Prior to the modeling sessions, Shuster's co-creator, Jerry Siegel, had developed an idea for a journalist to be Superman's love interest, Lois Lane. Shuster hired her as a model for Lois, and his depiction of Lois was based on his drawings of her hairstyle and facial features. Interviewed in 1996 by The Plain Dealer, she recalled, "I remember the day I met Jerry in Joe's living room. Jerry was the model for Superman. He was standing there in a Superman-like pose. He said their character was going to fly through the air, and he leaped off the couch to demonstrate." The New York Times wrote, "Ms. Siegel was the first in a long line of Lois Lanes, who have included Phyllis Coates, Noel Neill, Teri Hatcher, and Erica Durance on television, as well as Margot Kidder in the movies."

Following her modeling work for Shuster, she worked as an artist's model, sometimes using the professional name "Joanne Carter". She worked for a ship builder in California during World War II. After the war, Siegel moved to New York, where she ran into Jerry Siegel at a costume ball to raise money for cartoonists. Both had been married and divorced previously. They were married in 1948 and lived in Connecticut and New York before moving to California in the 1960s. They remained married until Jerry Siegel's death in 1996. They have a daughter together, Laura Siegel, who later recalled, "My father said she not only posed for the character but from the day he met her it was her personality that he infused into the character. She was not only beautiful but very smart and determined, and she had a lot of guts; she was a courageous person." In a profile of Joanne Siegel, NPR noted, "Though a number of actresses played [Lois Lane] on television and in the movies over the years, Superman co-creator Jerry Siegel always said that his wife, Joanne ... inspired the character of Lois Lane."

Despite the success of Superman in comic books, television and motion pictures, Jerry Siegel and Joe Shuster had sold the copyright to Detective Comics for $130. The Siegels led a modest lifestyle, their daughter recalled: "My mother and father lived in complete poverty for many, many years." Siegel worked for a time as one of California's early car saleswomen, she sold new and used Chevys from a lot in Santa Monica, to help support the family. Siegel lived in the Marina Del Rey in Los Angeles in her later years.

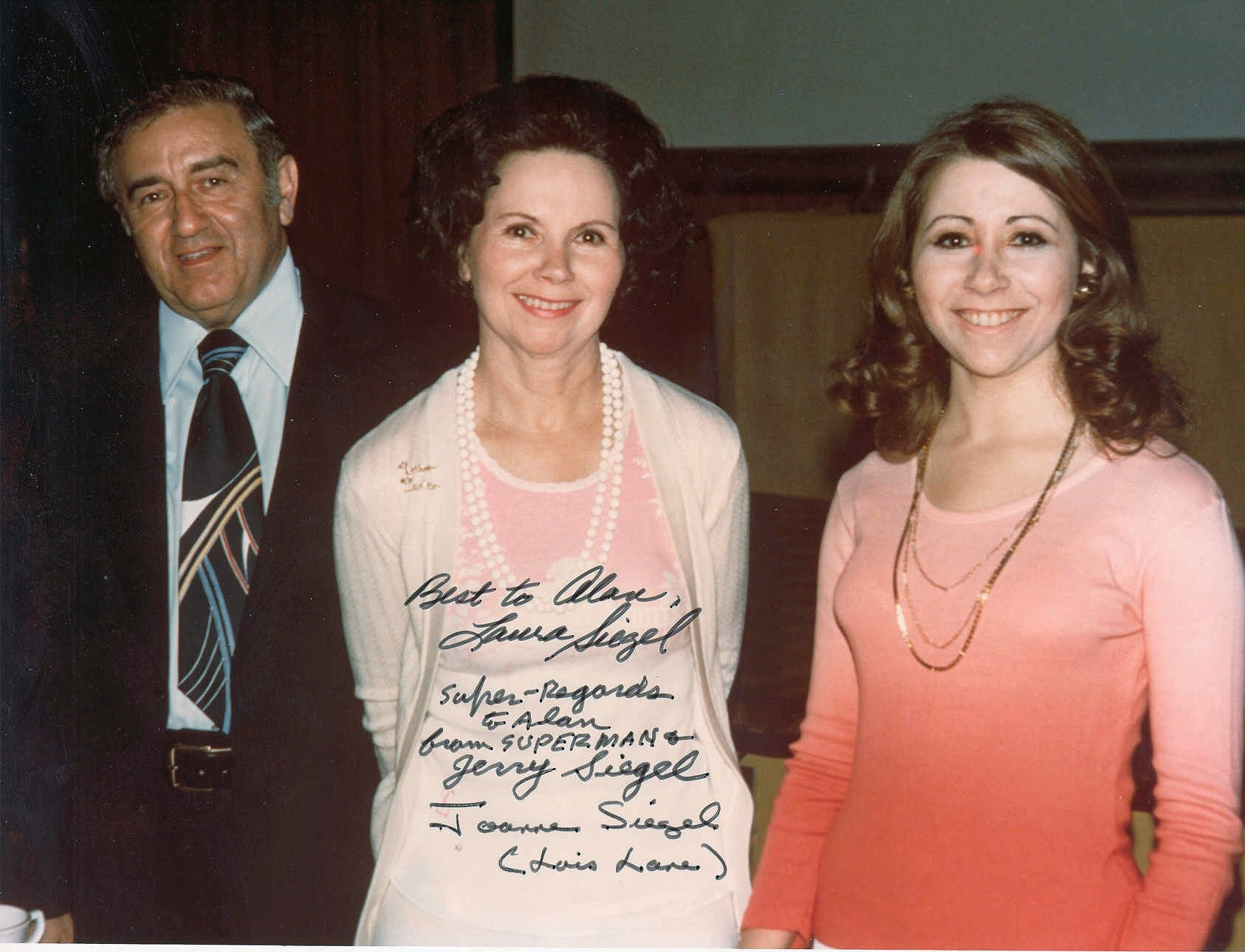
Jerry Siegel, Joanne Siegel and their daughter, Laura Siegel Larson in 1976.

Siegel devoted herself to reclaiming the original Superman copyright. At one point, she called the publisher of Superman and said, "How can you sit by and continue to make millions of dollars off of a character that Jerry co-created and allow him to live in this unbelievable poverty?" In the late 1970s, DC Comics agreed to pay both Siegel and Shuster a stipend of $20,000, later increased to $30000 per year for life, including health benefits, but Joanne Siegel was not satisfied and continued the fight, even after her husband died in 1996. She filed a lawsuit in 1999 seeking partial ownership of the Superman character. In 2006, Siegel won a partial summary judgment in a lawsuit with DC Comics. The Court found that Joanne Siegel and her daughter had successfully recaptured the Superboy copyright in 2004 and opined that the television program Smallville was infringing the Siegels' copyright. In 2008, Siegel secured a further ruling from a federal court in Los Angeles restoring her husband's co-authorship share of the original Superman copyrights. In a 72-page decision, the Court ruled that Jerry Siegel was entitled to claim a share of the United States copyright to Superman while leaving intact DC Comics' international rights to the character. Following the ruling, Joanne Siegel told the press, "We were just stubborn. It was a dream of Jerry's, and we just took up the task."

== Legacy ==
In 2009, Siegel was honored in Cleveland by having Parkwood Avenue renamed "Lois Lane" in her honor, as she was acknowledged to be the model for the "Superman" character from which the street name derives.

Upon hearing this, Siegel commented in an interview with People, "Beauty is valueless if you're not sending a message. Being associated with such a role-model as Lois Lane is the greatest honor that could've been bestowed upon me."

== Death ==
Siegel died on February 12, 2011, at St. John's Hospital in Santa Monica. Following her death, Siegel's lawyer noted, "All her life she carried the torch for Jerry and Joe — and other artists. There was a lot of Lois Lane in Joanne Siegel."
