= Lois Lane =

Fictional character in the Superman series

- Art by Gary Frank

Publication information
- Publisher: DC Comics
- First appearance: Action Comics #1 (June 1938)
- Created by: Jerry Siegel (writer); Joe Shuster (artist)

In-story information
- Species: Human
- Team affiliations: Daily Planet; Galaxy Communications
- Partnerships: Clark Kent / Superman; Jimmy Olsen; Supergirl
- Supporting character of: Superman; Superboy
- Notable aliases: Superwoman; Red Tornado
- Abilities: Superwoman Heat vision, X-ray vision, Freeze breath, Invulnerability, Flight, Superhuman strength, Speed and Hearing; Red Tornado Air manipulation and Durability

Lois Lane is a fictional character appearing in American comic books published by DC Comics. Created by writer Jerry Siegel and artist Joe Shuster, she first appeared in Action Comics #1 (June 1938). Lois is an award-winning journalist for the Metropolis newspaper the Daily Planet and the primary love interest of the superhero Superman and his alter ego, Clark Kent. In DC continuity, she is also his wife and the mother of their son, Jon Kent, the newest Superboy in the DC Universe.

Lois's physical appearance was originally based on Joanne Carter, a model hired by Joe Shuster. Jerry Siegel took her name from actress Lola Lane, while her character was inspired by actress Glenda Farrell's portrayal of the fictional reporter Torchy Blane in a series of 1930s films.

Depictions of the character have varied spanning the comics and other media adaptations. The original Golden Age version of Lois Lane, as well as versions of her from the 1970s onwards, portrays Lois as a dauntless journalist and intellectually equal to Superman. During the Silver Age of Comics, she was the star of Superman's Girl Friend, Lois Lane, a comic book series that had a light and humorous tone.

Since her debut in the comic books in 1938, Lois has appeared in various media adaptations and is among the best-known female comic book characters. Actress Noel Neill first portrayed Lois Lane in the 1940s Superman film series and later reprised her role in the 1950s television series Adventures of Superman, replacing Phyllis Coates from season two. Margot Kidder played the character in four Superman films in the 1970s and 1980s, Kate Bosworth in the 2006 film Superman Returns, and Amy Adams in the DC Extended Universe films. Teri Hatcher portrayed Lois in the 1990s television series Lois & Clark: The New Adventures of Superman. Erica Durance in the 2000s series Smallville and Elizabeth Tulloch in the Arrowverse TV shows. Actresses who have voiced Lois in animated adaptations include Joan Alexander in the 1940s Superman animated films, Dana Delany in Superman: The Animated Series, and Alice Lee in My Adventures with Superman. Rachel Brosnahan most recently played the character in the DC Universe film Superman (2025) and will reprise her role as Lois Lane in the upcoming film Man of Tomorrow (2027).

== Creation ==
Writer Jerry Siegel first conceived Lois Lane in 1934, when Siegel and Joe Shuster were still developing Superman. A major influence on Lois's characterization was actress Glenda Farrell and her portrayal of the fictional reporter Torchy Blane in a series of Warner Bros. films. The Torchy Blane movies were popular second features during the later 1930s. On the conception of Lois Lane, Siegel stated in the 1988 Time magazine:

My wife Joanne was Joe's original art model for Superman's girlfriend Lois Lane back in the 1930s. Our heroine was, of course, a working girl whose priority was grabbing scoops. What inspired me in the creation was Glenda Farrell, the movie star who portrayed Torchy Blane, a gutsy, beautiful headline-hunting reporter, in a series of exciting motion pictures. Because the name of the actress Lola Lane (who also played Torchy) appealed to me, I called my character Lois Lane. Strangely, the characterization of Lois is amazingly like the real-life personality of my lovely wife.

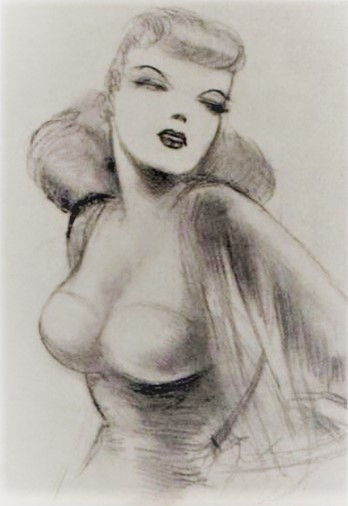
An early sketch of Lois Lane by Joe Shuster, modeled on Joanne Carter.

Artist Joe Shuster based Lois's physical appearance on a model named Joanne Carter. Carter had placed an ad in the Cleveland Plain Dealer newspaper in the Situation Wanted column, advertising herself as a model. Shuster corresponded with her and hired her as the model for Lois Lane. Shuster's depiction of Lois was modeled on her hairstyle and facial features. "To me she was Lois Lane. She was a great inspiration for me, though. She encouraged me, she was very enthusiastic about the strip; it meant a lot to me." Shuster said about Joanne Carter.

Joanne Carter married co-creator Jerry Siegel in 1948. On working with Joe Shuster for Lois Lane, Carter said in the 1983 Nemo magazine interview: "Joe was redrawing the strip, and it was going to be more realistic, rather than cartoony. I used to model for him every Saturday until he had enough drawings. He made so many stock drawings that it got to a point where he didn't need any more. We became such good friends by that time we decided we would always stay friends."

== Publication history ==
Lois Lane made her debut in Action Comics #1 (June 1938), the first published Superman story. Lois is the daughter of Ella and Sam Lane, in earlier comics, her parents were farmers in a town called Pittsdale. The modern comics depicts Lois as a former Army brat, born at Ramstein Air Base with Lois having been trained by her father, a US Army General, in areas such as hand-to-hand combat and the use of firearms. She has one sibling, her younger sister Lucy Lane. Lois is a journalist for the Daily Planet, one of the best investigative reporters and the best at the newspaper she works at. Lois has shown obtaining superpowers and becoming a superhero, some of her superhero identities are Superwoman and Red Tornado of Earth 2.

Aspects of Lois's personality have varied over the years, depending on the comic book writers handling of the character and American social attitudes toward women at the time. In most incarnations, she is shown to be an independent person who is smart, determined and strong-willed. Her physical appearance has varied over the years, depending either on contemporary fashion or media adaptations. In 1982, DC Comics hired Marilise Flusser as Lois Lane's fashion consultant to work with the comic book artists to create a contemporary look. In the 1990s, when the television series Lois & Clark: The New Adventures of Superman began airing Lois received a haircut that made her look more like actress Teri Hatcher, and her eyes were typically violet to match her character on Superman: The Animated Series. From the late 1980s through the 1990s, she was depicted with auburn hair in the comic books.

In the 1940s, Lois had a newspaper comic strip, Lois Lane, Girl Reporter, a direct spin-off of the Superman comic strip running at the time. A similarly titled comic series began appearing in the Superman comic book in 1944, starting with Superman #28. In 1958, DC Comics gave Lois a comic book series, Superman's Girl Friend, Lois Lane. The series focuses on her solo adventures and began publication in April 1958. In the 1960s, the series was one of DC's most popular titles and was the top ten best-selling comic books in America. She had a series featured in The Superman Family comic book from 1974 to 1982, in which Superman and Lois were married and had a teenage daughter Laura Kent, who has super powers like her father and yearns to be a print journalist like her mother. Released in 2019, Lois Lane, a 12-issue series by writer Greg Rucka and artist Mike Perkins investigates threats and conspiracies in the DC Universe.

Lois is the character most commonly associated with Superman, and throughout their long history, she has always been the most prominent love interest in Clark Kent/Superman's life. In the 1990s, after Clark proposes to Lois and reveals to her that he is Superman, she married him in the comic book Superman: The Wedding Album (December 1996). The couple's biological child in modern DC Comics canon was born in Convergence: Superman #2 (July 2015) a son named Jonathan Samuel Kent, who eventually becomes Superboy.

== Fictional character biography ==
=== Golden Age ===
The Golden Age Lois Lane and Superman, from the cover of Superman #27 (March–April 1944), art by Wayne Boring.

In her earliest appearances, Lois is a lovelorn columnist; she rises through the journalistic ranks, and throughout the Golden Age comics, her enduring depiction is as an aggressive, career-minded reporter for the Daily Star (later the Daily Planet). Lois becomes attracted to Superman while holding a fierce journalistic rivalry with his alter ego, Clark Kent. Lois is often unscrupulous in her efforts to scoop Clark, using tactics such as intercepting his telephone messages, sending him on wild-goose chases, and even slipping him knockout drops.

In stories published during the 1940s, Lois begins to suspect that Clark Kent is Superman, and makes various attempts at uncovering his secret identity, all of which backfire because of Superman's efforts. The first such story appears in Superman #17 (July–August 1942). This theme became particularly pronounced in the 1950s and 1960s Silver Age comic books.

Lois gained her first series of stories (without Superman) starting with Superman #28 (May–June 1944), Lois Lane, Girl Reporter, running in the Superman comic book for several years, had Lois defeating bad guys and getting front-page stories on her own, without any help from Superman.

In the Golden Age comics, Lois had a niece named Susie Tompkins, whose main trait was getting into trouble by telling exaggerated tall tales and fibs to adults. Susie's last appearance was in Superman #95 (February 1955). Subsequent comics presented Lois' only sibling, Lucy, as single and childless.

=== Silver Age and Bronze Age ===
When the reading audience of superhero comic books became predominately young boys in the mid to late 1950s, the focus of Superman stories shifted toward science fiction inspired plots involving extraterrestrials, fantasy creatures, and bizarre plots.

Lois's main interests in various late 1950s and 1960s stories became vying with her rival Lana Lang for Superman's affections, attempting to prove Clark Kent and Superman were one and the same or otherwise getting Superman into marriage. Superman's rationale for resisting her matrimonial desires was that marrying her would put her in increased danger from his enemies and that she could not keep his secret identity hidden. Regardless, Lois married several times in the Superman stories of this era, including to a Superman impostor from Kandor, the villainous Zak-Kul, and a man from the future. All these marriages were either annulled or otherwise forgotten.

Superman's Girl Friend, Lois Lane #1 (April 1958) art by Curt Swan and Stan Kaye.

Lois became more and more popular during the 1950s, and after appearing as the lead character in two issues of DC Comics' Showcase in 1957, DC created an ongoing series for Lois, titled Superman's Girl Friend, Lois Lane. The series ran for 137 issues, beginning in April 1958 to October 1974. Most stories were about Lois' romance with Superman, and were drawn by artist Kurt Schaffenberger. Schaffenberger's rendition of Lois became cited by many as the "definitive" version of Lois, and he was often asked by DC editor Mort Weisinger to redraw other artists' depictions of Lois Lane in other DC titles where she appeared. So many stories depicted Lois and marriage that the cover of a 1968 80-Page Giant that reprinted several such stories, the "All-Wedding Issue", described the magazine as "featuring Lois' schemes and dreams to marry Superman!".

The series Superman's Girl Friend, Lois Lane became one of DC's most popular titles, the third best-selling comic in 1962 and 1965. The title featured the first appearance of the Silver Age Catwoman, after an absence from the comics for over a decade.

While Lois is suspicious of Superman's secret identity as early as Superman #7 (1940), her suspicions grew during the early Silver Age, with many stories in her series focusing on her attempts to prove Superman and Clark Kent were one and the same. Stories showed Superman using various means to protect his secret identity from Lois, including his Superman robots or Batman disguising himself as Clark/Superman.

By the end of the 1960s, as attitudes toward women's role in American society changed, Lois' character changed as well. In Superman's Girl Friend, Lois Lane #80 (Jan. 1968), the character's fashions were updated to a then more contemporary look. Stories in the 1970s depicted Lois again as fully capable and less reliant on Superman. She engaged in more adventures without Superman being involved and was much less interested in discovering Superman's secret identity.

Lois had a series featured in The Superman Family (an anthology title started in the mid-1970s after the cancellation of Superman's Girl Friend, Lois Lane and Superman's Pal, Jimmy Olsen) from 1974 to 1982. In her series, Lois regularly battled criminals and often defeated them using her quick wits and considerable skill in the Kryptonian martial art of Klurkor, taught to her by Kryptonian survivors in the bottle city of Kandor. There were several cameos of the New Gods, including DeSaad and Darkseid. Lois Lane was the backup series in The Daring New Adventures of Supergirl in 1982 to 1983.

During the Silver and Bronze Age, Lois' backstory became more fully fleshed out, with various stories explaining her life before becoming employed at the Daily Planet. This backstory was attributed to the Lois Lane of Earth-One.

As summarized in various stories, Lois was born to Sam and Ella Lane and grew up on their farm in the small town of Pittsdale. At the age of two, Lois suffered measles, and at the age of three, whooping cough. At an unspecified time during Lois' childhood, her younger sister Lucy Lane was born. While Lois was a toddler, she encountered a rattlesnake in the woods near the Lane family farm. The snake was scared away by one of Kal-El's baby toys which had landed nearby in one of Jor-El's experimental rockets.

During Lois' adolescence, she won a youth contest run by the Daily Planet, with the prize being a trip to Metropolis to spend a week working as a cub reporter for the newspaper. There, she first met Clark Kent of Smallville, who was the other winner of the contest. Lois found Clark dull and became more interested in asking him for information about Superboy after learning Clark came from Smallville. During the week in Metropolis, Lois made a bet with Clark to see who would get the most scoops, which turned out to be Lois, as Clark was forced to constantly go into action as Superboy. Lois met Superboy for the first time while uncovering a criminal enterprise for one of her stories. At the end of the week, Clark paid off Lois' bet (an ice cream sundae), and the two returned to their respective hometowns. Lois would meet Superboy (but not Clark Kent) again during her adolescence while attending an all-girls summer camp near Smallville. There, Lois met Lana Lang, a fellow camper, for the first time. Lois would make further attempts at landing a job with the Daily Planet during her teenage years and spent time writing for her hometown's newspaper, the Pittsdale Star.

Upon finishing high school, Lois left Pittsdale and attended Raleigh College to study journalism. While in college, Lois worked for the student newspaper, the Raleigh Review, as a reporter and eventually its co-editor. After graduating from college, Lois became permanently employed at the Daily Planet. Clark Kent and Jimmy Olsen later joined the Planet's staff but Lois remained the newspaper's star reporter, winning the Pulitzer Prize. She was very dependent on Superman, however; he told her that having to rescue her so often from problems she caused prevented him from helping others. For example, when late for a deadline Lois jumped off a cliff expecting Superman to catch her "as he has done a thousand times", and fly her to her destination. When asked on a Sunday morning talk show what she would do if trapped in an underground mine with rescue impossible before the air ran out, Lois admitted that she would impatiently await Superman because "I've got a deadline to meet."

Eventually, Lois realized that she had wasted a good part of her career by staying in Metropolis for Superman's sake and left. As both a journalist and as a woman, she had to get on with her life.

After the 1985–1986 miniseries Crisis on Infinite Earths writer John Byrne revised the Superman legend and eliminated the Silver Age version of Lois from continuity. Before this happened, a final non-canonical imaginary story Whatever Happened to the Man of Tomorrow? was written by Alan Moore, meant as a send-off for the pre-Crisis versions of the characters, including Lois. Published at the same time but in Earth-One continuity was a two-issue miniseries, Lois Lane, in which she investigates missing children.

=== Modern Age ===
Lois Lane, as she appears on the cover of The Man of Steel #2 (October 1986), art by John Byrne.

Lois underwent a character alteration beginning with John Byrne's The Man of Steel miniseries, which significantly rewrote Superman's origin and history. In this modern version of events, Lois was portrayed as a tough-as-nails reporter who rarely needed rescuing. She was depicted as strong, opinionated, yet sensitive.

Lois's first real relationship in this version was with Jose Delgado, who she later discovered acted as a vigilante. José's legs are shattered in a battle with a Lexcorp cyborg/human hybrid gone amok. Delgado eventually recovered. He and Lois would have several on and off experiences together before the relationship completely disintegrated, due to Delgado accepting help from a Lexcorp subsidiary ARL.

Another major change made was that Lois did not fall in love with just Superman, although she was attracted to him. One reason was the revised nature of the Superman/Clark Kent relationship. In the original Silver Age stories, Superman had been the man who disguised himself as Clark Kent. In this newly revised concept, it was Clark Kent who lived a life in which his activity as Superman was decidedly secondary. Lois initially resented the rookie Clark Kent getting the story on Superman as his first piece when she had spent ages trying to get an interview. This sometimes ill-tempered rivalry remained the case until The Adventures of Superman #460–463 and Action Comics #650.

Following Clark's brief rampage under the influence of the Eradicator, Lois was hesitant to forgive Clark for "selling out" to Collin Thornton and running Newstime Magazine, but forgave him in a span of mere minutes when he returned to ask for his job back. Clark elected to repay Lois by finally letting go of his self-imposed inhibitions and passionately kissed her. The two became a couple, and eventually, Lois accepted a proposal of marriage. Clark shortly after revealed to her that he was Superman.

DC Comics had planned on Lois and Clark being married in 1993's Superman vol. 2 #75. With the then-upcoming television show Lois & Clark: The New Adventures of Superman, DC decided they did not want to have the two married in the comics and not married on TV. Partially as a result of this, Superman was killed in Superman #75 instead, dying in Lois' arms after a battle with the monster Doomsday. After a period of time, Superman returned to life, and both he and Lois resumed their relationship, though not without a few problems (such as a brief reappearance of Clark's former college girlfriend, the mermaid Lori Lemaris). Lois eventually decided to take an overseas assignment to assert her independence and not be dependent on Clark, who had begun to overprotect her. When Clark became convinced Lois was in danger, he and her father Sam allied to aid her secretly.

When Lois returned to Metropolis, she had been through several life-threatening exploits and was slightly amused when Clark informed her his powers had been depleted, and that he was her editor (due to Perry White's cancer). Upon discovering Clark still had her wedding ring within a handkerchief, Lois warmly broke down, teasing Clark and finally agreeing to become his wife.

Lois and Clark were finally married in the comic book Superman: The Wedding Album (December 1996), which featured the work of nearly every living artist who had ever worked on Superman. The issue was published during the week of October 6, 1996, coinciding with an episode of the television series Lois & Clark: The New Adventures of Superman, which featured the wedding of the two characters. The Wedding Album itself spent part of its opening pages accommodating and reconciling the then-current comic storyline of Lois and Clark having broken off their engagement.

Since their marriage, Clark and Lois continue to be one of the strongest relationships in comics. In 2006, the couple took the next step in adopting a newly arrived Kryptonian boy, who they named Chris Kent. The boy is later discovered to be the son of Jor-El's foe, General Zod. Although initially uneasy about raising a super-powered child, Lois has shown immense aptitude of being 'Mommy Lois.' Following a devastating battle with Zod, Chris sacrificed himself to seal the Phantom Zone rift, trapping himself inside with Zod's forces, leaving Lois without her son.

In the second issue of Final Crisis, Lois and Perry are caught in an explosion triggered by Clayface destroying the Daily Planet and Lois is critically injured. In the third issue, it is revealed that only Clark's heat vision is keeping her heart beating. Clark is visited by a mysterious phantom who insists that he must depart Earth immediately if he is to save his wife's life. The story is continued in the 3D tie-in comic Superman Beyond, where the female Monitor Zillo Valla stops time around Lois, allowing Superman to leave her side for a while, recruiting him and several of his multiversal doppelgangers in a mission to save the entire Multiverse, promising care for Lois. After defeating the dark Monitor Mandrakk, Superman brings back a distilled drop of The Bleed and administers it to Lois through a kiss, restoring her to full health. Lois is later seen in Final Crisis #6, one of the few still free humans.

After the events of Superman: New Krypton Superman must leave Earth for an undetermined amount of time swearing off his Earthly connections in the eyes of his fellow Kryptonians to keep an eye on General Zod the New Kryptonian military commander, but he secretly tells Lois he still considers her his wife and will come back to her. In the issues of Action Comics Lois has reunited with Chris Kent, who has aged to adulthood in the past months and became the new Metropolis hero Nightwing.Supergirl and Lana visit Lois' apartment to tell her that her sister Lucy Lane was killed during a battle with Supergirl. Lois does not believe that her sister is dead and refuses to accept the news until she has irrefutable proof. Lois asks Supergirl for a recovered piece of Superwoman's costume.

Lois hands her exposé in and the government is after her for treason. With agents on her tail, she makes a mad dash for it. When Lois is in custody, her father Sam Lane is there to greet her in an interview room in an unnamed facility. Sam tells Lois the only reason he has been lenient with her is because she is his daughter, while he does love her the planet will always come first over his family and threatens to make her disappear forever if she continues. Lois returns to the Daily Planet under cover of night and explains all to Perry. She points out the whole paper is at risk and everyone connected to it if her exposé runs. Perry understands and though he must protect the paper he is first and foremost a good journalist and nudges Lois in the right direction; he will not run the story but noted it must get out to the people somehow. Enlightened, she quits the Daily Planet, as Lois gets her edge back. It was later revealed she never really quit the Daily Planet.

Lois learns her father's forces destroyed New Krypton. She is kidnapped by Lucy and taken to Sam's secret base. There, Lois argues with her father, countering his insistence on regarding the Kryptonians as "rabid dogs" by pointing out that they naturally regard him as a genocidal maniac after he destroyed their planet. In the war between New Krypton and Earth, Supergirl finds them and threatens to kill Sam. Lois stops her, saying her father will be judged for his war crimes. Refusing to go to trial, Sam takes a gun and commits suicide. Later, Lois visits the imprisoned Lucy. She expresses disbelief on what her sister has become. Lois says while she will not miss her father, she will miss her sister.

In Superman: Grounded, Superman begins a journey through America to reconnect with the American people, and Lois, though confused at first, supports his choice. Lois later travels to Rushmark and finds an old college friend Brian, who invites her to have dinner with him and his wife. When Lois leaves Brian's home she is met by Superman. The two reaffirm their love to each other and go to Chicago. There, Lois helps Superman arrest a violent father who has been attacking his wife and son. Later, Lois and Superman investigate a factory in Des Moines. Lois wants to publish an article, which would reveal the workers' illegal activities, but Superman forces her not to. Feeling betrayed, Lois returns to Metropolis and does not speak to Superman for a while. When Lois is kidnapped by Lisa Jennings, a woman who wants to destroy Superman, he rescues her. With the danger over. Superman apologizes to Lois about what happened in Des Moines. Lois replies that she wrote the article anyway, saying that she was a reporter before she was his wife. Knowing that his wife did the right thing, Superman kisses her. The two then return home.

=== The New 52 ===
In 2011, DC Comics relaunched its titles and its main continuity was rebooted with the New 52. Lois now works for Morgan Edge heading up the media division of the Daily Planet. She views Clark as a friend and is unaware that he is Superman.

Lois investigates the story of twenty people who developed metahuman powers after being kidnapped by Brainiac. Her search leads her to a U.S. senator, who revealed to be one of the Twenty. The senator dies, but not before transferring his powers to Lois, who falls into a coma. Lois later awakes from her coma at the hospital, with Jonathan Carroll at her side. Lois manifests psychic powers and helps Superman fight the Psychic Pirate. During the fight, Lois learns that Clark is Superman but falls back into a coma. After defeating the Psychic Pirate, Superman brings Lois back to the hospital. Later, the Parasite attacks the hospital and attempts to steal Lois' powers. Superman tricks the Parasite into absorbing Lois' psionic energy. The power overwhelms the Parasite, causing him to collapse. Lois awakens from her coma but she does not seem to remember Superman's identity.

Lois is the main character in the Superman: Lois Lane #1 one-shot. In this story, Lois' sister, Lucy, asks for her help in finding her roommate Amanda Suresh, who had been kidnapped by a mysterious group called "the Cartel." According to Lucy, Amanda had been taking a drug that transformed her into a monster. As Lois investigates the Cartel, she gets captured and taken to the Cartel's headquarters. There, Lois finds out the Cartel had been capturing people who had been mutated by the drug. Lois escapes and rescues Amanda when the captured monsters cause a riot. As she returns home, Lois finds out Lucy had been taking the drug. As Lucy apologizes for putting all three in danger, Lois chooses to publish her story about the Cartel.

Some time after this, an organization led by the mysterious Hodor-Root learn Superman's secret identity, prompting him to share that information with Lois. When Hodor-Root tries to analyze Clark's new 'Super-Flare' power, Lois reveals his identity to the public in the hope of removing their blackmail card, but this forces Clark to go on the run, hunted by criminals and law enforcement as some apparent side-effect of his Super-Flare has depleted his powers. Superman eventually learns that his depleted powers are due to Vandal Savage infecting him with a form of radiation that inhibits his cells' ability to absorb solar radiation, subjecting himself to kryptonite as a form of chemotherapy. With his powers restored, Clark reconciles with Lois, accepting that she exposed his identity for good reasons.

In the New 52: Futures End, set five years in the possible future of the New 52-verse. Lois is a freelance reporter and her blog "The Fast Lane" is one of the most read sources of news in the world.

The birth of Lois and Clark's son in Convergence: Superman #2 (July 2015), art by Dan Jurgens.

In the miniseries Convergence, which featured many Post-Crisis DC Universe characters, including a married Superman and his pregnant wife Lois Lane, deal with the impending birth of their child, as Superman is called to protect the city. Convergence shows the birth of their son, Jon Kent.

Following Convergence, DC announced the spin-off comic book series Superman: Lois and Clark, debuting in October 2015 by Dan Jurgens and Lee Weeks. The eight-issue series is set several years after the Convergence event, where Clark and Lois and their son Jon have been living and working in the New 52 universe. The couple now lives in California and has changed their last name to White (a tribute to Perry White). Lois has become an anonymous author, publishing several critically acclaimed books under the alias name "Author X." While Clark continues his superhero duty, protecting cities and civilians quietly behind the scenes. Their son, Jonathan, eventually began to develop superpowers of his own (similar to those of his father Superman) and learned the truth about his parents' true origin.

In The Final Days of Superman, the pre-Flashpoint Superman helps his New 52 counterpart defeat a man who has become convinced that he is the 'true' Superman after exposure to some of Superman's excess energy. New 52-Lois is present when 'her' Superman expires as recent energy exposures catch up with him, after he tells her his life story for posterity.

=== DC Rebirth ===
In June 2016, DC Comics relaunched its entire line of comic book titles with DC Rebirth. The publisher once again re-established the Post-Crisis Superman as the principal Superman in DC comics, along with his wife, Lois Lane, and their son, Jonathan.

Lois began to investigate the disappearance of her New 52 counterpart, and after learning the apparent death of her other-self, she returns to the Daily Planet posing as her counterpart. Following a confrontation with Mister Mxyzptlk, Lois and Superman's essence is merged with their New 52 counterpart, creating a new DC Universe.

Released in July 2019 to July 2020, Lois stars in a 12-issue limited series Lois Lane written by Greg Rucka and art by Mike Perkins. The series sees Lois as she investigates stories of conspiracy, intrigue and murder in the DC Universe. Writer Greg Rucka intended for the series to focus on Lois' legacy as a hard-boiled journalist and the investigative world which she inhabits, with the series reflecting the state of modern journalism in the world today.

== Superhero identities ==
Lois Lane has become a superhero and gained superpowers several times in the comics, animation, and live-action series.

=== Superwoman ===
Lois Lane, first appearance as Superwoman in Action Comics #60 (May 1943), art by Joe Shuster.

Lois was the first person to assume the Superwoman persona and has become the superheroine on several occasions. Her first appearance as Superwoman (as well as Superwoman's first appearance in DC Comics) was in Action Comics #60 (May 1943). The story is set in a dream sequence, where, after Lois is hit by a truck, she dreams a transfusion of Superman's blood gives her superpowers and she becomes Superwoman. In Superman #45, Lois believes Hocus and Pocus—a pair of fraudulent magicians—have given her superpowers, and with Superman's help and intervention, Lois once again becomes Superwoman. In Action Comics #156, Lois actually gains superpowers from one of Lex Luthor's inventions, which launches a short-lived career as "Superwoman." In The Superman Family #207, the Earth-Two Lois gained superpowers from her husband, after Superman brought an extraterrestrial plant into their home, with Lois losing the powers after the death of the plant. Other stories have Lois transformed into Superwoman when Superman transfers some of his powers to Lois, or due to Mr. Mxyzptlk's interference. On Smallville in the episode "Prophecy", Jor-El gives Lois all of Clark's powers for one day.

In the original Crime Syndicate of America on Earth-Three, Lois Lane and Superwoman were two separate individual characters. Superwoman is a supervillain and Lois married Earth-Three's greatest champion, Alexander Luthor. The pre-Crisis version of the characters perished when Earth-Three was destroyed during the events of Crisis on Infinite Earths. In the graphic novel JLA: Earth 2, Superwoman, a member of the Crime Syndicate is the alternate version of Lois Lane. She is an Amazon by birth and the chief editor of the Daily Planet. She inhabits the same antimatter universe which contains the planet Qward. The New 52 version of Superwoman of Earth-3 is also named Lois Lane and is part of the Crime Syndicate.

In All-Star Superman, the 12-issue comic book series by Grant Morrison and Frank Quitely, Lois becomes a Kryptonian Superwoman for 24 hours. In the story, Superman (who believed he was dying) revealed his secret identity to her and takes Lois to his Fortress of Solitude to spend her birthday. While at his Arctic sanctuary, he presents Lois with her birthday present, a formula called "Exo-Genes" created by Superman from his own DNA, that allows Lois to have his powers for twenty-four hours. With her new Kryptonian powers and new Superwoman costume (made by Superman), the two spend the whole day together on different adventures and shared a kiss on the moon. At the end of the story, Superman proclaims his love for Lois, before he flies off into the sun to repair it. Lois later appeared as Superwoman in the animated All-Star Superman film, voiced by Christina Hendricks.

In DC Rebirth, the New 52 Lois and Lana gained superpowers due to the solar energy explosion caused by the death of the New 52 Superman. This results in both Lois and Lana becoming Superwoman, with Lois possessing all of Superman's traditional powers, while Lana has the ability to absorb solar energy and release it in other forms. Lois later dies at the hands of a female Bizarro, being overloaded with solar energy the same way Superman was killed.

In 2024, Lois returned as Superwoman in DC Comics in the DC All In initiative. She first appeared as Superwoman in Superman vol 6 #19. During the "Absolute Power" storyline, Amanda Waller's Amazo robots steal the powers of Earth's metahumans, among others. In Superwoman Special #1, it was revealed that General Zod is among those affected, with Lois gaining his powers and becoming Superwoman again. Soon after, Lois loses her powers after using most of them up while battling X-El, a Bizarro clone of Lex Luthor. Lois regained her powers and became Superwoman during DC K.O. in 2025.

=== Red Tornado ===
Lois Lane as Red Tornado in Earth 2 #17 (January 2014), art by Nicola Scott.

Following the DC relaunch, the series Earth 2 debuted in 2012, set on the parallel world of that name. It depicts a modern take on the Golden Age world, starring the Justice Society of America and superheroes of that period.

On Earth 2, Lois Lane is married to Superman. When Clark's cousin Kara arrived on earth, she stayed with Clark's parents, before moving in and living with Clark and Lois. Lois considers Kara as her daughter and Kara calls Lois mom. Five years prior to the start of the story, during the first Apokoliptian invasion of Earth 2, Lois was killed by one of Darkseid's assassins at the Daily Planet, she died in her husband's arms. Superman and many other heroes of Earth 2 are killed in the war.

Five years later, as various heroes begin to rise and various gods from Apokolips begin to wreak havoc again. Lois' consciousness is revealed to have survived and was downloaded into the robot body of Red Tornado by her father Sam Lane and Robert Crane. Lois, now as Red Tornado, possessed the power of wind manipulation and cyclone generation abilities. Lois bands together with Green Lantern (Alan Scott), Batman (Thomas Wayne), Accountable (Jimmy Olsen) and the other gathered heroes to fight against the forces of Apokolips. After a protracted battle with what was thought to be a surviving brainwashed Superman, Lois realizes he is, in fact, a Bizarro, and takes advantage of his deteriorating form to disintegrate him with a cyclone blast. In the story, Lois is referred to by Doctor Fate as the "Resurrection hope".

During Superman's rampage and destruction on Earth 2, Lois is among a group that discovers Val-Zod, a Kryptonian, hidden in a cell beneath Arkham. Lois helps Val feel accepted and welcomed on Earth 2, learn to control his superpower, and overcome his agoraphobia (due to his prolonged travel in space to Earth). Val-Zod eventually becomes the new Superman of Earth 2.

In the second Apokoliptian invasion of Earth 2, Lois and Kara are reunited, after Kara and Huntress return to Earth 2 from Prime Earth. Lois, along with Kara, Val, Huntress, Batman and other heroes, fights against the armies of Apokolips and new villains appearing across Earth 2. While searching for Huntress beneath the fire pits of Earth 2 in DeSaad's cloning facility, Lois, Val, Kara and Batman found the real Superman who has been held captive for five years. He was revived by DeSaad and was used as the genetic source for the Kryptonian clones. The extraction of his DNA corrupted his body leaving him without any powers. Lois and Superman reunite briefly, before he sacrificed himself one last time, destroying the Parademon facilities using his corrupt DNA. After Superman's death, Lois gave Kara the symbol from his uniform, which was then worn by Kara in remembrance.

In the final days of Earth 2, Lois' instincts as a journalist lead her to attempt to preserve and record the history and stories of Earth 2 in her large memory bank in the hope that someday, someone will read the data and rebuild this world. After the destruction of Earth 2, Lois and the remaining civilians and heroes of Earth 2 relocated to a new world.

The writer of Earth 2, Tom Taylor, specifically resurrected Lois Lane on Earth 2 after he was told to kill off the character in the Injustice comic series. Taylor stated "bringing Lois in was quite a personal thing, because having to do such horrible, horrible things to her in Injustice, the first thing I asked when I got on the book was if I could bring back Lois. Then it was just a matter of working out exactly how." Taylor received "Women in Refrigerators" criticism for his Injustice comic stories. Bringing back Lois as Red Tornado was Taylor's way to "unfridge" Lois. As Taylor noted, in Lois' first appearance as Red Tornado, Lois literally came out of a blue refrigerator. Other reasons for bringing back Lois involve Superman, Taylor commented "While evil bastard Superman is out there killing and maiming and destroying, I wanted Lois to exist as the counterpoint to this. She's the beating heart at the center. She's the good Ying to Superman's evil Yang. Where there's Lois, there's hope."

Nicola Scott, the artist on Earth 2, described drawing Red Tornado Lois: "I wanted Lois to be Lois, despite the fact that she's metal. I wanted to make sure she looked really feminine and really beautiful, so all she'd need is a flesh coating and a wig and she'd be good to go."

=== Other identities and powers ===
- Green Lantern – In Tangent Comics: Tales of the Green Lantern #1, Green Lantern of Earth-9 is introduced with three different origin tales. In one origin story, Lois is an archaeologist, explorer, and adventurer hired by billionaire playboy Booster Gold to explore underwater ruins off the coast of Florida. She discovers a community of mutants known as the Sea Devils and is murdered by Booster Gold when she tries to protect the Sea Devils. Her body is taken to the underwater castle and resurrected as the Green Lantern.
- Elastic Lass – Lois becomes Elastic Lass, after borrowing Jimmy Olsen's Elastic Lad serum, given to him by Professor Potter, so she can catch the Wrecker, who has been blowing up statues around Metropolis.
- Isis – On the television series Smallville, Lois is possessed by the spirit of the Egyptian goddess and hero Isis while wearing the Amulet of Isis in the tenth-season episode "Isis." This was based on the character of Isis who first appeared in an eponymous 1975-77 CBS television series, later known as The Secrets of Isis. Isis was then brought into DC comics canon, both as a superhero and as a separate goddess. As Isis, Lois had super strength, speed, telekinesis, telepathy, energy projection, magic, and could fly.
- Krypton Girl – In the imaginary story in Superman's Girlfriend Lois Lane #47, Lois is from Krypton and takes the superhero name Krypton Girl on Earth; Clark Kent is an ordinary human.
- Leopard Lady – Lois becomes the supervillain Leopard Lady and marries Lex Luthor when a machine that can bring out evil in a person is used on her.
- Power Girl – In Superman #125, Lois dreams she and Clark gain superpowers and become Power-Girl and Power-Man.
- Stiletto – On the series Smallville, Lois takes on the superhero persona of Stiletto, after saving Chloe from a carjacker in the season eighth episode "Stiletto".
- Super-Lois – The comic book Superman's Girlfriend Lois Lane featured several stories in which Lois gains superpowers and becomes Super-Lois. In one, Lois gains superpower after Superman gives her a blood transfusion. In another story, Lois is invited to visit Kandor with three other accomplished women of Earth; while there, a scientist gives her superpowers. Lois uses her new superpowers to save Superman from a Kryptonite trap set by Mayhem, Inc.
- Supermaid – In an imaginary story in Superman #158, Lois goes to Krypton as a child and becomes Supermaid. Lois' father sent his infant daughter to Krypton in a starship after discovering the Sun would go nova and destroy the Solar System. Arriving on Krypton within a power beam modifies Lois' molecular biology, giving her superpowers. Lois was adopted and raised by a zookeeper as Kandi Khan and became the Superheroine Supermaid.
- Ultra Woman – On the television series Lois and Clark: The New Adventures of Superman in the episode "Ultra Woman" Superman's powers are transferred to Lois when a red Kryptonite laser beam hit him. Martha Kent makes Lois a new costume and Clark introduces her to Metropolis as Ultra Woman.
- Divine empowerment – Lois was briefly granted divine powers as the Goddess of Integrity by the war and death gods but gave the powers up at the urging of Wonder Woman. Her powers include flight, enhanced intellect, teleportation and weather manipulation.
- Psychic powers – In The New 52, Lois was given various psychic powers by Senator Hume; she has redeveloped and lost these powers numerous times. Some of her powers are telepathy and astral projection.

== Earth-Two version ==
DC Comics instituted its multiverse system in the early 1960s for organizing its continuity and introduced the Earth-Two Superman in Justice League of America #73 (August 1969). This retcon declared the Golden Age Superman and Lois Lane stories (i.e. comics published from 1938 through the early 1950s) as having taken place on the parallel world of "Earth-Two" versus the then mainstream (Silver Age) universe of "Earth-One".

The Earth-Two Lois Lane and Superman, from the cover of Action Comics #484 (June 1978), art by José Luis García-López and Dick Giordano.

In Action Comics #484 (June 1978), a flashback story reveals Earth-Two's Lois became infatuated with Clark Kent after the latter lost his memory of his superheroic identity (thanks to a spell cast by the old Justice Society of America enemy Wizard working for Colonel Future), with the result of Clark acting more aggressive and extroverted. Clark and Lois began to date each other and were soon married. During the honeymoon, Lois discovered that Clark was indeed Superman. After recruiting the aid of Wizard, Lois restored Clark's memory and Wizard surrendered to the authorities.

The now-married Lois and Clark appeared in a series of stories in The Superman Family #195–199 and #201–222 titled Mr and Mrs Superman, which presented their further adventures early in their marriage. Susie Tompkins made a return as a recurring character. Years later, Lois and Clark acted as parental figures for Power Girl, Superman's cousin, after she arrived on Earth.

During the Crisis on Infinite Earths miniseries, the Earth-Two Lois Lane was seemingly seen for the final time, as Lois, the Earth-Two Superman, and the Superboy of Earth-Prime are, at the end of the story, taken by Earth-Three's Alexander Luthor Jr. into a paradise-like dimension. Following the events of Crisis on Infinite Earths, this version of Lois was retroactively removed from DC's continuity.

In 2005's Infinite Crisis miniseries, it is revealed that the Earth-Two Lois Lane Kent, along with Superboy, Alexander Luthor Jr., and Superman, have been watching the events of the post-Crisis DC Universe from their pocket dimension. Out of the four observers, she is the only one who still believes that the new universe is just going through a rough patch; Superboy-Prime and Alexander are convinced that Earth is corrupt, and Kal-L is slowly becoming swayed to their way of thinking. Kal-L is determined to restore Earth-Two and heal Lois, who is dying from an unknown illness. He believes that Lois' health will recover when she returns to her home universe. Despite the restoration of Earth-Two, Lois Lane dies in the arms of her husband Superman despite his protests that he cannot let her die. After Kal-L is mortally wounded by Superboy-Prime, he comments that he finally understood Lois' final words "It's... not... going..." as meaning that it would never end for them, and one day it would be understood that even the heroes who had been lost in the original Crisis were still out there somewhere. After his demise, Superman and Lois are shown reunited in the stars, while their bodies are buried on Earth alongside Superboy (Conner Kent), who gave his life to stop Superboy-Prime's attempts to restore his Earth.

Lois later returns as a sinister Black Lantern with her husband in the Blackest Night crossover. Her first task is to kidnap Martha Kent with her spouse and stating that she and Kal-L wish for Kal-El, Conner Kent, and Martha, to be reunited with Jonathan Kent in death. She proved unable to deal with the resourcefulness of Martha Kent, and was set ablaze by the widow, but kept regenerating until Krypto intervened, ripping the black ring out of her hand and preventing regeneration for long enough to allow Superman and Conner Kent to destroy the Black Lantern powerhouses attacking Smallville, and reaching town to aid others unhindered. Black Lantern Lois later appears to Power Girl, claiming that she has escaped the ring's corrupting influence, and needs her help. This was just a ploy to get close enough to her husband's body, which was being held in the JSA headquarters after his black ring had been removed. Black Lantern Lois sacrifices herself to resurrect Kal-L by giving her ring to him.

== In other versions ==
During the years 1942–1985 Editora Brasil-América and Editora Abril which published the Brazilian versions of Superman comics, Lois Lane's name was translated to "Miriam Lane" and later to "Miriam Lois Lane." In Spanish speaking countries, her name was translated to "Luisa Lane" in comics, TV series and movies.

=== Elseworlds imprint ===
- Superman: Speeding Bullets, a 1993 Elseworlds story based on the concept of an amalgamation of Superman and Batman. Martha and Thomas Wayne discovered Baby Kal-El, adopt and named him Bruce. Bruce discovers his superpowers when his parents are killed and create the identity Batman to fight criminals in Gotham City. Lois relocates to Gotham City after Lex Luthor buys the Daily Planet, and soon forms a relationship with Bruce Wayne, the owner of her new job at the Gotham Gazette. She later convinces him to abandon the identity of Batman and adopt a more hopeful persona of Superman.
- Superman: The Feral Man of Steel, a 1994 Elseworlds special in Superman (vol. 2) Annual #6, based on The Jungle Book stories with elements from Tarzan. Raised by wolves in 19th-century Indian Jungle and is given the name K'L'L. Lois is an American girl who falls for K'L'L.
- In Superman: Kal, Lady Loisse is the daughter of the late Lord Lane in the Middle Ages. She is held captive by Baron Luthor, who hopes to make her his bride. Lois falls for Kal, a blacksmith's apprentice after he wins a contest against Luthor's best fighters. She accepts his request for her hand in marriage, as payment for him forging a suit of armour for Luthor from his rocket. After their wedding, Loisse is taken from Kal by Luthor, who subsequently killed her.
- Lois is a teacher from the undercity in the 1996 series, Superman's Metropolis, modelled on Fritz Lang's classic 1927 science-fiction film Metropolis.
- Superman: War of the Worlds, a Superman story adapted into the H. G. Wells novel The War of the Worlds. Set in 1938, after applying for a job at the Daily Star, Clark and Lois witness the arrival of the Martian invasion of Earth. Superman dies saving the Earth, and Lois marries Lex Luthor who becomes the Vice President.
- In the 1998 series, JLA: The Nail, the Kents never found Clark, Lois is selected by Green Lantern to provide the Justice League with some positive media presentation after a recent propaganda campaign focuses on the idea that many modern metahumans are alien invaders. Tracking recent kidnapped heroes to a secret base, Lois is introduced to the Kents, who provide a safe house for various heroes after Lana Lang smuggled them out of the facility, and later discovers that the true mastermind behind the conspiracy is Jimmy Olsen, mutated into a Kryptonian through genetic experiments carried out based on DNA samples found in Kal-El's crashed and abandoned ship. Jimmy is finally defeated by Kal-El, who was here raised by an Amish couple until their deaths at Olsen's hands, with Lois writing about how Kal-El's time with the Kents helped him accept his abilities and grow into the Superman he should have been. In the sequel, JLA: Another Nail Lois helps the Kents create Kal-El's 'Clark' disguise- albeit naming him 'Carl' on impulse- to give him a chance at a normal life outside of his role as Superman, reasoning that the simplicity of the glasses will stop people paying too much attention to him, while their original plan to completely cover him with a false beard would make people suspect that Kal-El had something to hide.
- John Byrne's Superman & Batman: Generations follow the life and families of Superman and Lois and their descendants over the course of three separate Elseworlds series.
- Published in 1999, The Superman Monster takes elements from Mary Shelley's novel Frankenstein where Superman is similar to the Frankenstein monster. Set in Gotham City in 1888, Eloise Edge is the daughter of Burgomaster Edge and the fiancé of scientist Vicktor Luthor who creates the creature, Klaus, using Kryptonian technology. Eloise develops an affection for Klaus, and after she is killed by a ricocheting bullet and revived in the same Matrix that created Klaus, she accompanies him to the Arctic to learn more about her new condition.
- In the series, Son of Superman, fifteen years after the disappearance of Superman, Lois' teenage son Jon Kent begins to display superpowers and learns his father is Superman. Jon joins the rebel organization to fight against the corrupt U.S. government.
- In JLA: Created Equal, all men on Earth except Superman and Lex Luthor are killed by a strange disease. When Lois become pregnant, Superman is forced to leave Earth after Luthor reveals he is still a carrier for the disease. Years later, Lois gives birth to her and Clark's son, Adam, who has various half-siblings conceived with the other females using sperm samples provided by Superman, but Adam accidentally kills his mother when he hugs her too hard.
- Lois is a captain in the military in series Superman: Last Son of Earth and Superman: Last Stand on Krypton. A reverse of the Superman origin with Kal-El being sent from Earth to Krypton, discovering the Green Lantern power ring, and journeys to Earth and help its people fight against the dictator Luthor.
- In Superman/Tarzan: Sons of the Jungle, Kal-El, the last survivor of Krypton crash-lands in East Africa and is raised by apes to become the Lord of the Jungle; and meet the adventurer John Greystoke, Jane Clayton and her friend Metropolis reporter Lois Lane.
- In the 2003 Elseworlds series Superman: Red Son, Superman's escape rocket did not land in Smallville, but in the Soviet Union under Joseph Stalin. Lois is married to Lex Luthor but still uses the surname Lane for her articles in the Daily Planet. Superman saves her life, and the two have an instant attraction with each other; however, Lois never acts on her feelings and remains married to Luthor. When her husband is elected President, Lois becomes First Lady and serves as an unofficial American emissary to Wonder Woman. After the fall of Superman's Greater Soviet Union and presumed death, he attends his "funeral" wearing a suit and glasses. He and Lois are shown looking at each other before he departs.
- Superman: True Brit, the 2004 series re-imagines the origin of Superman, where his spaceship crashed in Weston-super-Mare in England instead of the town of Smallville in America. A humorous look at Superman and the British tabloid press, it features Louisa Layne-Ferret, a hard-edged reporter. Lois herself briefly appears to offer an American perspective on Superman and invites Colin Clark to visit America.

=== Flashpoint ===
In the alternate timeline of the Flashpoint event, a young Lois Lane sneaks into the facility where her father Sam Lane is stationed to bring him a birthday cake. During a breakout, Lois briefly encounters Kal-El and Neil Sinclair. Sinclair attempts to pursue revenge against her father for the experiments that were performed on him. Sam traps Sinclair and himself in the Phantom Zone.

Years later, Lois is reporting on a fashion show in Montmartre when the Atlanteans flooded Europe. She is saved by the Amazons who take her to "New Themiscyra" (the United Kingdom). Once there, she learns that Jimmy Olsen, who dies in the flood while trying to save an old man, was an agent of Cyborg. Lois agrees to spy on the Amazons for Cyborg. When the time comes for her to undergo a near-fatal "conversion" into the Amazonian ranks, she escapes, aided by Penny Black, who is wounded by Artemis in the process.

During this time, Lois walks through the remains of the London Underground and encounters Grifter and the Resistance. Lois soon joins the Resistance. After meeting up with the recovering Penny, she uses Cyborg's device to locate her missing armor at Westminster. Lois later broadcasts a message to the world that the Amazons have imprisoned people in internment. The Amazons in Westminster attempt to kill her. Lois is then rescued by Kal-El (who comes to protect her from Sinclair who has returned). During the fight, Kal-El manages to destroy Sinclair, but Lois is caught in the blast. Before Lois dies in the arms of Kal-El, she tells him to save the people.

=== Injustice: Gods Among Us ===
In the digital prequel comic to the video game Injustice: Gods Among Us, Lois is married to Superman and is pregnant with their child. While on a story at the docks with Jimmy Olsen, she is kidnapped by The Joker and Harley Quinn and taken to a submarine where they perform surgery on her. When the Joker is captured by the Justice League, he informs them he has planted a nuclear bomb in Metropolis and wired the detonator to Lois's heart, set to go off when she dies. While under the influence of Scarecrow's kryptonite-laced fear gas, Superman mistakes Lois for Doomsday and, in an attempt to protect his family, unknowingly flies up into space with her, killing both Lois and their unborn child in the process. When she dies, a nuclear bomb obliterates Metropolis. Superman, devastated by the death of Lois and their unborn child as well as his inadvertent role in destroying Metropolis, kills the Joker and begins his campaign for world domination. Her death serves as the catalyst for Superman's new outlook, as he becomes more willing to kill to protect the world.

In Year Three of the series, Superman is put in a magic comatose sleep, where events play out differently in his dream scenario. In this dream world, Superman imagines he had broken free of the fear gas in time to save Lois and their unborn child. Batman had killed Joker to prevent the possibility of another attack on Superman and his family. Lois eventually gives birth to their daughter Lara Lane-Kent. Superman and Lois live a happy and normal life, raising their daughter Lara, who eventually develops superpowers and with her father's guidance becomes a superhero of her own. Superman is eventually awakened from his slumber by Ares and is left feeling angrier and more bitter after realizing the life he could have had with Lois and their child. In Year Five, in an alternate world, Lois and Clark are shown happily visiting Clark's parents, telling them that she is pregnant.

=== DC Comics Bombshells ===
DC Comics Bombshells, a comic book series set in an alternate history of World War II, Eloisa "Lois" Lane is a mixed-race 17-year-old newspaper hawker from Metropolis' Cuban district. When criminals working for Killer Frost kidnap her, she is rescued by the Batgirls (a group of female vigilantes) and partners with them to defeat Hugo Strange, the man who crippled her mother. Later in the series, she gets a job working at the Gotham Gazette for Vicki Vale and eventually begins dating Supergirl.

=== Nightwing: The New Order ===
In an alternate reality, Nightwing activates a device ending an ongoing war between the super-powered beings and depowers ninety percent of the superhero population and leads to a future where superpower is outlawed. Lois is a Blue Lantern and a member of the Titans, who form a resistance against the anti-metahuman government.

=== Superman: Secret Identity ===
Published in 2004, Superman: Secret Identity is a four-issue miniseries written by Kurt Busiek and art by Stuart Immonen. Set in the real world where superheroes only exist in comic books. Clark Kent, living in a small town in Kansas, discovers that he has the same powers as Superman, the superhero he was named after. Years later, Clark moves to New York, working as a writer and secretly saving people with his abilities. He meets Lois Chaudhari, an Indian American designer on a blind date (set up by friends because their names resemble the fictional couple Clark Kent and Lois Lane). The two quickly fall in love, get married and have twin daughters Jane and Carol Kent, who also inherit their father's powers.

=== Gotham City Garage ===
Gotham City Garage, a digital-first comic book series written by Collin Kelly and Jackson Lanzing, reimagines DC superheroes and villains as bikers in a post-apocalyptic world. Governor Lex Luthor controls the modern utopia Gotham City and the rest of the continent is a wasteland. Lois Lane runs a rebel news radio station "The Frequency". When Barda asks for help, Lois and Jimmy Olsen join her in the resistance.

=== Tales from the Dark Multiverse ===
Tales from the Dark Multiverse: Death of Superman, an anthology series that explores alternate takes on classic DC stories set in a different world in the Dark Multiverse. After Superman is killed by Doomsday, filled with anger and grief, Lois merges with the Eradicator and gains Kryptonian powers so she can take revenge on the corrupt world and those who let Superman die, including both heroes and villains.

=== DC x Sonic the Hedgehog ===
Lois appears in the third issue of the intercompany crossover DC x Sonic the Hedgehog, where she informs a Superman-suited Knuckles the Echidna that Lex Luthor wishes for an audience with him, while also saying Luthor is more dangerous than he appears.

=== Marvel Comics cameos ===
Lois Lane has had several (mostly cameo) appearances alongside Clark Kent in past works of Marvel Comics, namely in X-Men #98, Superman vs. The Amazing Spider-Man (1976), The Mighty Thor #341 (1984), Excalibur #8, Ghost Rider (vol. 3) #66 (1995), and Marvels Epilogue (September 2019).

=== Absolute Universe ===
In Absolute Superman, Lois Lane appears as an agent of Lazarus Corp, led by Ra's al Ghul. She is initially opposed to Superman, but after cuffing herself to him and seeing him save other people, she starts to have a change of heart. This version also vocally hates writing, but after writing a report on her experience with Superman, she realizes that she actually enjoys it. She continues to have conflicting feelings about Superman and Lazarus' until eventually siding with the Man of Steel, helping him escape Brainiac's clutches and helping him and Jimmy Olsen defend Smallville against Lazarus.

== Newspaper comic strip ==
Lois Lane, Girl Reporter is a newspaper comic strip featuring Lois Lane, a spin-off from the Superman comic strip and topper to the Superman Sunday strip in the Cleveland Plain Dealer. Twelve comic strips were produced and originally ran between October 24, 1943, to February 27, 1944. Lois also appears in the Superman daily newspaper comic strip, distributed by McClure Syndicate which ran continuously from January 1939 to May 1966 with a separate Sunday strip added on November 5, 1939.

== Books ==
=== Comic books ===
Lois has appeared in several self-titled miniseries, one-shots and collected editions:

- Lois Lane – a two issue limited series published in August and September 1986.
- Superman: Lois Lane – a one-shot published in June 1998 as part of the "Girlfrenzy!" Fifth-week event.
- Flashpoint: Lois Lane and the Resistance – a three-issue limited series published August 2011-October 2011 as part of the Flashpoint crossover.
- DC Archive Editions: Superman's Girlfriend Lois Lane Archives Vol. 1 – a collection of Silver Age Lois Lane stories. Showcase #9-10 and Superman's Girlfriend, Lois Lane #1-8. Published in January 2012.
- Lois Lane: A Celebration of 75 Years – special anniversary anthology celebrating Lois Lane's 75 years in comics. Collects material from Action Comics #1-2, 6, 484, 600, 662, Adventures of Superman #631, All Star Superman #2-3, Man of Steel #2, Showcase #9, Superman #29, 33–34, 58, 168, Superman 80-page giant #1, Superman's Girlfriend, Lois Lane #1, 5, 16, 23, 42, 106, and Wonder Woman #170. Published in November 2013, the collection compiles stories from Golden Age to Silver Age and modern adventures.
- Superman: Lois Lane #1 – a one-shot published in April 2014.
- Superman: Lois and Clark – an eight-issue limited series, collects #1-8 published in August 2016.
- Lois Lane – a 12-issue limited series by writer Greg Rucka and artist Mike Perkins released in July 2019 to July 2020.

=== Graphic novels ===
==== Lois Lane and the Friendship Challenge ====
A graphic novel by writer Grace Ellis and artist Brittney Williams, and focus on a 13-year-old Lois Lane as she navigates the confusing worlds of social media and friendship during summer break in the sleepy town of Liberty View. Released in August 2020, it is part of DC's original graphic novels for young readers.

==== Girl Taking Over: A Lois Lane Story ====
DC graphic novels for young adults, Girl Taking Over: A Lois Lane Story, written by Sarah Kuhn and art by Arielle Jovellanos was released in April 2023.

=== Novels ===
==== Lois Lane ====
Lois is the protagonist in the young adult novel series, Lois Lane, written by Gwenda Bond and published by Switch Press. The series follows the adventures of Lois Lane as a savvy, whip-smart, and unafraid contemporary teenage high school girl. The first book in the series, Fallout, was revealed by the author in 2014 and was released on May 1, 2015. Bond revealed the second book, Double Down, in July 2015, and the book was released on May 1, 2016.

On the series, Bond said: "Lois is an icon, of course, a superhero without any superpowers ... except her unmatched bravery and smarts. Not to mention her sense of humor and her commitment to truth and justice. She's also one of my all-time favorite characters—which is why I jumped at the chance to write a novel featuring a teen Lois, moving to Metropolis and becoming a reporter for the first time. And, most of all, to get to put Lois front and center in the starring role, obviously."

- Fallout – first novel in the Lois Lane series by Gwenda Bond. The novel features a teenage Lois Lane, an Army brat, who has lived all over the world. Lois is starting a new life in Metropolis with her family. While attending a new high school, she tries to solve a mystery as a group known as the Warheads begins to tamper with people's minds via a high-tech immersive video game. Two prequel short stories: Lois Lane: A Real Work of Art and Lois Lane: Cloudy With a Chance of Destruction was also published by Switch Press. Fallout received positive reviews and was named by Kirkus Reviews one of the "Best Teen Books of 2015" in the science fiction and fantasy category.
- Double Down – second Lois Lane novel by Gwenda Bond and published by Switch Press in May 2016. The book also received positive reviews. Double Down continues to follow teenage Lois Lane as she settled into her new life in Metropolis, and has a job that challenges her. Lois finds herself embroiled in a dangerous mystery that brings her closer to the dirty underbelly of Metropolis.
- Triple Threat – Switch Press announced a third Lois Lane novel, Triple Threat, in August 2016. The book was released in May 2017.

==== Lois & Clark: The New Adventures of Superman ====
Based on the ABC television series Lois & Clark: The New Adventures of Superman four original novels were published in 1996:

- Heat Wave – written by author Michael Jan Friedman and published by HarperCollins.
- Exile – by Michael Jan Friedman
- Deadly Games – by Michael Jan Friedman
- Lois & Clark: A Superman Novel – a full-length Lois and Clark novel by author C. J. Cherryh and published by Prima Lifestyles.

=== Non-fiction ===
- Examining Lois Lane: The Scoop on Superman's Sweetheart – an anthology exploring Lois Lane's many incarnations and multiple adaptations from comic book to various films and television series. Analyzing the character in various media through the perspectives of feminism, gender studies, and cultural studies.
- Investigating Lois Lane: The Turbulent History of the Daily Planet's Ace Reporter – an in-depth look at the character and her history in different media by comic book historian Tim Hanley.

== In other media ==
Lois Lane has appeared in various other media adaptations including radio, animations, films, television, video games and Broadway musical.

== In popular culture ==
- The American sitcom Seinfeld made numerous references to Lois Lane over its nine-year run:
  - In the episode "The Outing", Jerry tells a female reporter for a college newspaper "I was attracted to you, too. You remind me of Lois Lane".
  - In the episode "The Marine Biologist", when Elaine accuses Jerry of helping a strange woman just so he can take her out on a date, Jerry replies that Superman is never suspected of such intentions when saving a woman's life, prompting Elaine to comment "Well, you're no Superman", to which Jerry responds, "Well, you're no Lois Lane".
  - The episode "The Mom & Pop Store" has Elaine tell Jerry she's been doing some snooping for him. "Ah! What'd you find out, Lois?" he replies.
  - In the episode "The Race," Jerry dates a woman named "Lois" and enjoys frequently using her first name and slyly making Superman-related references in her presence.
  - In the episode "The Face Painter". George discovers that a woman he is dating is deaf in one ear and therefore might not have heard him tell her he loves her. "Don't you see what this means?" he says. "It's like the whole thing never happened. It's like when Superman reversed the rotation of the Earth to save Lois Lane!".
  - The episode "The Cartoon" has Jerry make fun of Elaine's drawings, leading her to reply: "It's better than your drawings of naked Lois Lane".
- The Spin Doctors' 1991 album, Pocket Full of Kryptonite, takes its title as a reference to the album's first song, "Jimmy Olsen's Blues". The song is sung from the point of view of Daily Planet photojournalist Jimmy Olsen, who's in love with Lois Lane and jealous of Superman because of it.
- In the movie, A Time to Kill (1996) Jake Brigance consults with Ellen Roark about the case and the judge is clearly annoyed and says "If Lois Lane will let us continue".
- In the movie, One Fine Day (1996) the editor of the newspaper reporter Jack Taylor (George Clooney) has a cat named after Lois Lane.
- In the song "Superman" by the band Peggy Sue, Lois Lane is mentioned in the line: "I'm in love with Lois Lane, but she doesn't even know my real name".
- In the song "Rapper's Delight" by The Sugarhill Gang, she is mentioned in the line: "I said, "By the way, baby, what's your name?" She said, "I go by the name of Lois Lane". According to the song, the rapper Big Bank Hank tells Lois Lane why he would make a better boyfriend than Superman.
- The 1964-67 show Underdog is a parody of Superman and its star reporter Sweet Polly Purebred is based on Lois Lane.
- Keone Madrid directed and choreography a dance video titled "Lois Lane" and features a poem by Rudy Francisco "I'm a Superman, thanks to Lois Lane" which includes the line, "Superman... The Man of steel, big Blue, the last son of Krypton, he is faster than a speeding bullet, stronger than a locomotive, he has Lasers for eyes, X-ray vision and can fly without even flapping his arms, but his most notable power... was Lois Lane, the love of an amazing woman is a phone booth, that can turn a man from a spineless news reporter into a symbol of justice, into the reason why it's safe to walk outside while the sun is sleeping."
- The That's Entertainment comic shop successfully petitioned the Worcester, Massachusetts City Council to change the name of the private street running alongside the store to "Lois Lane". On December 28, 2012, the new sign was installed. A celebration at the store followed on December 30, 2012, featuring an unveiling, free sketches of Lois by Paul Ryan, and a Lois Lane lookalike contest.
- "To Lois" a poem by Shane Koyczan is a love letter from Superman to Lois Lane, written from Clark's perspective.
- In the movie, Mermaids (1990) Kate Flax (Christina Ricci) asks her sister Charlotte (Winona Ryder) if her boyfriend has ever kissed her like Superman kisses Lois Lane.
- "From the Backbeat" by Lucy Hale includes the line "And my dad was a Superman stick shift driver, stay at home Lois Lane beside him."
- "Superhero" by 5 Seconds of Summer includes the line "She met him on the staircase, like Kent and Lois Lane."
- In the Mexican comedy TV series El Chapulín Colorado, a parody of superhero shows, Captain Hopper says his mother is Lois Lane.
- "Waiting for Superman" by Daughtry includes the line "She's just watching the clouds roll by and they spell her name like Lois Lane."
- "Lois Lane" a song by pop artist Noelle Bean, includes the line "I'm so happy, and now we're flying, like Superman and Lois Lane."
- "Lois Lane" a song by British indie rock band Farrah from the album Moustache includes the line "If you'll be my Lois Lane, I'll be your superman."
- Mandy Moore portrayed Lois Lane in the 2012 YouTube parody short film The Death and Return of Superman, directed and narrated by Max Landis.
- In the movie It (2017), Mr. Keenes compares Beverly Marsh to Lois Lane when she tries his glasses after she tells him he looks like Clark Kent.
- In the Netflix TV series Stranger Things season 4 episode 8 ("Chapter Eight: Papa"), Mike Wheeler compares his girlfriend Eleven to Superman and himself to Lois Lane by quoting "One day she's gonna realize that I'm just some random nerd that got lucky that Superman landed on his doorstep. I mean, at least Lois Lane is an ace reporter for the Daily Planet, right?"
- Lois Lane is also the name of an important character in the musical Kiss Me, Kate. She is not connected with the Superman character.

== See also ==
- The Dutch girl group Loïs Lane
- Biblical/Greek origin of name Lois
- Superman and Lois Lane
