= Superman: Last Son of Earth =

Comic book miniseries from 2000

- Cover to Superman: Last Son of Earth #1, art by Doug Wheatley

Publication information
- Publisher: DC Comics
- Format: Mini-series
- Genre: Superhero
- Publication date: 2000
- No. of issues: 2
- Main character(s): Kal-El; Lois Lane; Lex Luthor

Creative team
- Written by: Steve Gerber
- Artist: Doug Wheatley
- Colorist: Chris Chuckry

Superman: Last Son of Earth is a 2000 American comic book miniseries, published by DC Comics under its Elseworlds imprint. Written by Steve Gerber with art by Doug Wheatley, the two-issue storyline focuses on social commentary, particularly xenophobia, cultural stagnation, and authoritarianism. The story is a reverse of the usual Superman origin, with Kal-El being sent from Earth to Krypton and discovering a Green Lantern power ring. With the powers of a Green Lantern, Krypton's adopted son journeys to Earth, the planet of his birth, discover the remnants of a civilization struggling to survive amid both ecological adversities and a ruthless would-be dictator named Luthor. A sequel, Superman: Last Stand on Krypton was released in 2003.

== Characters ==
The characters appeared in the story are from both elements and cast of the Superman and Green Lantern mythology:

- Kal-El
- Jonathan and Martha Kent
- Jor-El
- Lara
- Lois Lane
- Perry White
- Seyg-El
- Kelex
- Green Lantern Corps
- Guardians of the Universe
- Jimmy Olsen
- Lex Luthor

== Plot ==
Jonathan Kent is a scientific genius who discovers that a meteor is about to crash into Earth. He then builds a rocket to carry his wife and son into space, but his wife would rather stay by his side, and so their son is sent alone. The ship enters a wormhole and eventually lands on Krypton. Clark Kent is adopted by Jor-El and renamed Kal-El. Kal eventually finds a Green Lantern ring and saves Krypton. He later uses the ring to recover his memories and he returns to Earth, where he meets his love, Lois Lane, and his greatest enemy, Lex Luthor. Due to Kal's body having adapted to the stronger gravity of Krypton, he is a physical powerhouse when he returns to Earth (with superhuman strength, durability, and speed, much like the classic Superman in his earliest appearances), which he discovers when Luthor steals his ring in an attempt to access its power.

== Sequel ==
The sequel Superman: Last Stand on Krypton was released in 2003, also written by Steve Gerber and art by Doug Wheatley. The story picks up 10 years after Superman: Last Son of Earth.

== In other comics ==
The premise of Superman becoming a Green Lantern on Krypton was visited in mainstream continuity. In JLA #8-9, the Key traps the Justice League in dream worlds using a neural virus. In Superman's mind, he was born and raised on a Krypton that never exploded. One day he discovered the dying Green Lantern Tomar-Re crashed on Krypton. Tomar-Re gave Superman his power ring and named him the Green Lantern of Sector 2813.

== Publication ==
- Superman: Last Son of Earth #1-2 (52 page, July-August 2000)

== See also ==
- List of Elseworlds publications
- Batman: In Darkest Knight, a similar Elseworlds story in which Batman becomes a Green Lantern
