= Doug Wheatley =

Canadian comic book artist

Doug Wheatley, sometimes credited as Douglas H. Wheatley or Doug Tropea-Wheatley, is a Canadian comic book artist who has illustrated numerous comic books including several Star Wars and How to Train Your Dragon stories for Dark Horse Comics. He also illustrated the book Fire & Blood, written by George R. R. Martin.
