= Eduardo Barreto =

Uruguayan comic book artist (1954-2011)

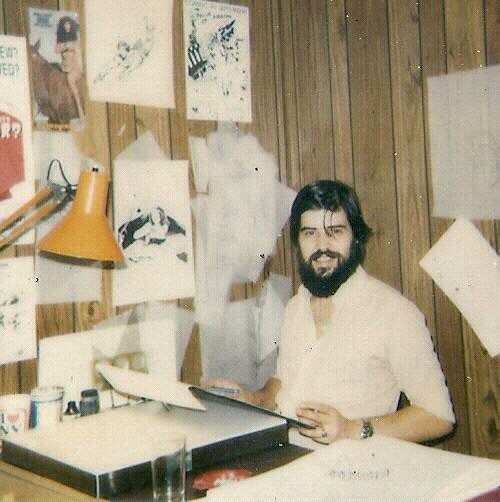
- Eduardo Barreto at his studio, 1987
- Born: Luis Eduardo Barreto Ferreyra; March 1, 1954 Montevideo, Uruguay
- Died: December 15, 2011 (aged 57) Montevideo, Uruguay
- Areas: Cartoonist, Penciller, Inker
- Pseudonyms: Kopy, S. Gneis
- Notable works: Batman, Judge Parker, The New Teen Titans, Superman
- Awards: 1993 Wizard Fan Award for Best Graphic Novel, 1997 Silver Morosoli for Graphic Humor, Caricature, and Comics

Luis Eduardo Barreto Ferreyra (March 1, 1954 – December 15, 2011) was a Uruguayan artist who worked in the comic book and comic strip industries including several years of prominent work for DC Comics.

All of his children are artists. Two of them, Diego and Andrea, also work in comics, Diego as an artist, Andrea used to be a colorist and Guillermo who is an inker and illustrator. The three of them occasionally collaborated with Eduardo Barreto.

== Early life ==
A native of the Uruguayan capital, Montevideo, Luis Eduardo Barreto Ferreyra spent his childhood and youth in a house on Calaguala street in the city's Sayago neighborhood. He grew up reading comics and being an avid supporter of his favorite soccer team, Club Nacional de Football. In interviews, Barreto reminisced about the time when, at age seven, he was reading a comic and decided he would grow up to be a professional comic strip artist.

== Career ==
=== In Uruguay and Argentina ===
A self-taught artist, Barreto named Russ Manning, Hal Foster and Warren Tufts as his three main artistic influences. When he was 15 years old, his portfolio under his arm, he went to each and every newspaper in Montevideo looking for a job. With a Richard Lionheart biographical comic (inspired by Foster's Prince Valiant, one of his favorite comics) as his strongest work and which he had intended to sell outside of Uruguay, he finally found a job at the newspaper El Día. The editor for the newspaper's children's magazine (El Día de los Niños) liked Barreto's art, but he asked him to do something more Hispanic. Thus, an adaptation of the Spanish epic poem Cantar de Mio Cid (The Lay of the Cid), was soon published in the magazine, scripted and drawn by Barreto, aged 16.

In 1974 he created a science fiction and space opera strip inspired by The Morning of the Magicians, a book by Louis Pauwels and Jacques Bergier. He created the strip intending to sell it to a syndicate, as his first love in comics was strips, and called it El Poderoso Halcón (The Mighty Hawk). In Uruguay, however, his only client was the newspaper magazine he was already working for, in which he published two pages featuring the character on Sundays. Artists that had influenced his work include, Hal Foster, Warren Tufts, and Mark Schultz along with many others.

A year later, Barreto sold the strip to United Press International, and the syndicate distributed his strips to some sixteen or seventeen newspapers in Latin America. There was even talk of translating it into English, but it never happened, due to international paper and oil crisis in the mid-1970s. At age 21, Barreto was publishing a strip all across Latin America.

Working outside Uruguay was a logical consequence of the career he had been forging for himself, a logical consequence of wanting to make a living in comics. Since making a full living from comics in Uruguay was impossible, he traveled to Buenos Aires, Argentina, to leave some samples in publisher Editorial Columba (house of comic anthology magazines El Tony and Dartagnan). He returned to Montevideo, and supplemented his comic work for El Día with artwork for advertising agencies.

After getting married and moving, he returned to Buenos Aires on vacation, and visited Columba again. The publisher's chief art editor, Antonio Presa, asked him why he hadn't answered the letter in which they offered him a position working on the strip Kabul de Bengala. Barreto never had received the letter, as it had been sent to his former address.

Starting in 1975, he worked for about three years for the Argentinian publisher, first living in the country for a year, working in the Nippur IV studio (which was named as the classic Argentinian historieta/character Nippur de Lagash). In the morning he worked in the Kabul art (scripted by H. G. Oesterheld), and in the afternoon he worked at the Nippur studio, as an assistant to Ricardo Villagrán; or rather a ghost artist. Among others, he worked on "Mark" (doing full pencils starting with issue seven). After that year he moved back to Uruguay, working there and traveling once a month to Argentina. By then he was working on several Nippur studio characters, but on his own, and signing his own name. Eventually, tired of Ray Collins' (Eugenio Zapietro) scripts, he signed his Kabul art with aliases, such as "S. Gneis" or "Kopy"; using the latter when he had to copy another artists' styles.

=== United States work ===
After three years working in Argentina, his editor advised him to try his luck in the United States. He had reached a certain ceiling in the regional market. In 1979 he went to New York City, and his first U.S. work was inking for Marvel Comics was Marvel Team-Up #88 (Dec. 1979) featuring Spider-Man and the Invisible Girl, with script by Chris Claremont and pencils by Sal Buscema. The same afternoon he got that assignment, he also received a Hawkman origin story for World's Finest Comics #261 from DC Comics, and a horror story from Western Publishing. After a few months he returned to Uruguay, but he would go back to the United States in 1983. He would live there for about three years, working first on the Archie Comics superhero imprint Red Circle, particularly in The Shield. Three or four months later, he started to work on Superman for DC, and on other things for Marvel and Western as well.

He did most of his U.S. work for DC Comics and the Uruguay audience knew him as the "Uruguayan Batman artist", something that was only a partial look at his work. In addition to being the most well-known Uruguayan artist in international comics, he was also the only Uruguayan to draw a regular U.S. series continuously, and not as fill-in, guest artist. First he drew eight issues of Atari Force (October 1984 to August 1985) and then a very long run drawing of most of the issues from #13 (Oct. 1985) to #49 (Nov. 1988) of The New Teen Titans vol. 2. During those years, he worked for other comic publishers and drew for other media including a He-Man story book in 1985.

During the 1980s, in addition to his Titans work, he drew stories, covers, and pin-ups featuring a wide variety of DC characters: Superman, Batman, Legion of Super-Heroes, Green Arrow, The Flash, and in licensed comics published by DC such as Star Trek. In 1989 he illustrated the prestige format graphic novel Lex Luthor: The Unauthorized Biography, written by James D. Hudnall, in which Superman is practically absent, instead featuring Clark Kent in his investigative journalist role.

In 1989 and 1990, Barreto drew The Shadow Strikes with writer Gerard Jones. The two also collaborated on Martian Manhunter: American Secrets (1992), a miniseries set in the 1950s.

In the 1990s Barreto worked with several companies and characters, such as Dark Horse Comics, for whom he drew Indiana Jones, Aliens/Predator: Deadliest of the Species, and Star Wars: A New Hope – The Special Edition.

For DC Comics, his 1990s work included Superman: Speeding Bullets, Justice League Quarterly, Sgt. Rock, and others. He inked the first appearance of Agent Liberty in Superman vol. 2 #60 (Oct. 1991). His Superman: Under A Yellow Sun focused on Clark Kent's career as a novelist. For Tekno Comics he drew Mickey Spillane's Mike Danger, about a hard-boiled detective who finds himself in a futurist world.

In the 2000s, he continued to work for various publishers, such as Claypool Comics, for whom he illustrated Elvira, Mistress of the Dark comic books. For Oni Press he drew the western story The Long Haul, and the gangster graphic novel Union Station. For Marvel he drew Marvel Knights between July 2000 and September 2001, scripted by Chuck Dixon. He would also work for IDW Publishing on Cobb: Off the Leash and Doomed, and for Moonstone Books' Captain Action the latter two written by Beau Smith. In 2005, for Dark Horse, he drew novelist Michael Chabon's first extended comic book story, in The Amazing Adventures of the Escapist #7, and later contributed to the series The Escapists written by Brian K. Vaughan. He worked on DC's Birds of Prey in 2004 and 2006. In 2006 he drew for Boom! Studios' Planetary Brigade, and the following year he did a short story for Marvel's Civil War: Front Line.

In May 2006 he returned to newspaper strips, taking over as artist of Judge Parker from Harold LeDoux. Shortly afterwards, Barreto suffered a serious car accident, and while he was in the hospital, Judge Parker's art was undertaken by artists such as Graham Nolan, John Heebing, and Eduardo Barreto's son Diego, who had been working as an artist for a few years already, mainly in advertising but doing some work for U.S. comic publishers.

=== Return to Uruguayan work ===
After his jump to the U.S. scene, Barreto did very little work for the Uruguayan market. Among the things he worked on in his country were comic stories for the book Historiet@s.uy (2000) and Freeway magazine; and the cover for Jaime Roos's album "Hermano Te Estoy Hablando" (2009). He taught comic book classes in ORT university, and was part of the jury in one of the comic contests for Montevideo Comics, a local convention. In 2004 he illustrated a science fiction prose novel, Guide To A Universe, by writer Natalia Mardero; and in 2005 Memories Of A Flu, a children's novel by writer Helen Velando. Among other works scripted by himself, around 2009 he was working on a new adaptation of the book Ismael, by Uruguayan writer Eduardo Acevedo Díaz, and a historical graphic novel set in Colonia del Sacramento, during Viceroy Pedro de Cevallos time. These works were never finished.

=== Final years ===
Barreto eventually returned to Judge Parker, and continued working on that and occasional stories with other characters, such as Superman and Captain Action. In 2010, he was stricken with meningitis and was forced to abandon the Judge Parker daily strip in March 2010, which was taken over by Mike Manley. Sometime later, apparently recovered from meningitis, he set to work on other projects. In April 2011 it was announced that Eduardo Barreto and his son Diego would work on Irredeemable, and in July 2011 he took over the art for The Phantom's Sunday strips. His last published work was in DC Retroactive: Superman - The '70s (Sept. 2011), finished from his hospital bed, and with some pages drawn by fellow Uruguayan Christian Duce. Barreto died on December 15, 2011. Before his death, Barreto drew Vampire Wedding commissioned by Robert Huttinger and Francesca Lombardo, founders of Castalides Pictures, a London-based film production company producing Vampire Wedding, the comic book and the TV series.

== Tributes ==
With his impeccable draftsmanship and attention to nuance and detail, Eduardo Barreto was a true artist's artist. A mainstay of DC Comics, he was one of the key artists during the 1980s who not only helped define the look and feel of the DC Universe but got me hooked on the Teen Titans. His incredible work and vision will be missed.
— Jim Lee, upon Barreto's death

== Bibliography ==
=== Archie Comics ===
- Blue Ribbon Comics #3 (full art); #11 (inks over Carmine Infantino) (1983–1984)
- Shield – Steel Sterling #3 (1983)
- Steel Sterling #3–7 (full art); #6 (inks over Carmine Infantino) (1983–1984)

=== Dark Horse Comics ===
- Aliens/Predator: Deadliest of the Species #4–12 (full art); #2–3 (inks over Jackson Guice) (1993–1994)
- Indiana Jones and the Sargasso Pirates #4 (full art); #1 (inks over Paul Guinan), 2-3 (inks over Karl Kesel)
- Star Wars: A New Hope – The Special Edition #1–4 (1997)

=== Oni Press Comics ===
- The Long Haul graphic novel (2005)

=== DC Comics ===
- Action Comics #573 (inks over Alex Saviuk) (1985)
- Action Comics Weekly #635 (1989)
- All-American Comics #1 (1999)
- Atari Force #13–15, 17–20 (full art); #10 (inks over Jose Luis Garcia-Lopez) (1984–1985)
- Batman #520, Annual #17 (full art); #566 (inks over Jon Bogdanove) (1993–1999)
- The Batman Chronicles #17 (1999)
- Batman: Legends of the Dark Knight #60–61 (1994)
- Batman: Master of the Future #1 (1992)
- Batman: Scar of the Bat #1 (1996)
- Batman: Shadow of the Bat #72 (1998)
- Batman: Spoiler/Huntress – Blunt Trauma #1 (1998)
- Batman: The Vengeance of Bane #2 (inks over Graham Nolan) (1995)
- Batman: Vengeance of Bane Special #1 (inks over Graham Nolan) (1993)
- Batman Villains Secret Files #1 (1998)
- Checkmate #14 (1989)
- Conjurors #1–3 (1999)
- DC Comics Presents #76, Annual #4 (1984–1985)
- DC Retroactive: Superman – The '70s #1 (2011)
- Detective Comics #488 (Elongated Man); #596–597 (full art); #669, 688, 714–715 (inks over Graham Nolan) (Batman) (1980–1997)
- Doc Savage #17–18 (inks over Rod Whigham) (1990)
- Doom Link #1 (Superman and Batman) (1995)
- The Flash Plus #1 (1997)
- The Flash Secret Files #3 (2001)
- Forever Maelstrom #1–6 (inks over John Lucas) (2003)
- Ghosts #94 (1980)
- Green Arrow vol. 2 #7, 90 (full art); Annual #7 (inks over Rick Burchett) (1988–1995)
- Heroes Against Hunger #1 (1986)
- Justice League Quarterly #6–7 (full art); #14 (inks over Mike Collins) (1992–1994)
- Legends of the DC Universe 80-Page Giant #2 (2000)
- Legion of Super-Heroes vol. 3 #56 (1989)
- Lex Luthor: The Unauthorized Biography #1 (1989)
- Man-Bat #1–3 (inks over Henry Flint) (1996)
- Martian Manhunter #33–35 (2001)
- Martian Manhunter: American Secrets #1–3 (1992)
- The New Teen Titans vol. 2 #13–15, 17–26, 28–32, 34, 36–42, 45–46, 48–49, Annual #4 (1985–1988)
- Night Force vol. 2 #4 (1997)
- The Question Returns #1 (1997)
- Robin vol. 4 #47–48, Annual #6 (1997)
- Secret Origins vol. 2 #35 (full art); #33 (inks over Jim Valentino) (1988)
- Secrets of Haunted House #37 (1981)
- Sgt. Rock Special #2 (1994)
- The Shadow Strikes #1–4, 8–10, 12–15 (full art); #5–6 (inks over Rod Whigham) (1989–1991)
- Showcase '95 #9 (1995)
- Showcase '96 #9 (1996)
- Silver Age 80–Page Giant #1 (2000)
- Star Trek #7 (1984)
- Storming Paradise #2, 4 (inks over Jackson Guice) (2008)
- Supergirl vol. 2 #21 (1984)
- Superman #397, 399 (full art); #661 (inks over Richard Howell) (1984–2007)
- Superman vol. 2 #60 (inks over Dan Jurgens) (1991)
- Superman: A Nation Divided #1 (1999)
- Superman and Wonder Woman - the Hidden Killer (1993)
- Superman: Speeding Bullets #1 (1993)
- Superman: Under a Yellow Sun #1 (1994)
- Swamp Thing Annual #4 (inks over Pat Broderick) (1988)
- Time Warp #3 (1980)
- World's Finest Comics #261 (Hawkman) (1980)
- Xero #9–10 (1998)

==== DC Comics/Marvel Comics ====
- Batman/Daredevil: King of New York #1 (2000)

=== Marvel Comics ===
- Battlestar Galactica #10 (inks over Pat Broderick) (1979)
- Captain America #292–293 (inks over Paul Neary) (1984)
- Civil War: Front Line #7 (2006)
- Iron Man #129 (inks over Sal Buscema) (1979)
- Jack of Hearts #4 (inks over George Freeman) (1984)
- Marvel Knights #1–13, 15 (2000–2001)
- Marvel Team-Up #88 (inks over Sal Buscema) (1979)
- Marvel Westerns: Two-Gun Kid #1 (2006)

Preceded by Stan Woch	The New Teen Titans vol. 2 artist 1985–1988	Succeeded by George Pérez
Preceded by n/a	The Shadow Strikes artist 1989–1991	Succeeded by Rod Whigham
