= Indiana Jones (comics) =

Comic book series

- Cover to Dark Horse Comics's February 2008 collection.

Character information
- First appearance: Raiders of the Lost Ark #1 (September 1981)

Publication information
- Publisher: Marvel Comics; Dark Horse Comics
- Formats: Original material for the series has been published as a set of ongoing series, limited series, and one-shot comics.
- Genre: Action/adventure; Based on Raiders of the Lost Ark
- Publication date: 1981–2010

Reprints
- Collected editions
- Omnibus Vol. 1: ISBN 1-59307-887-0
- Further Adventures Omnibus Vol. 1: ISBN 1595822461

The Indiana Jones franchise has appeared in many comic books. Marvel Comics initially held the comic book licensing rights before they were acquired by Dark Horse Comics in 1990. Marvel published adaptations of the films Raiders of the Lost Ark, Indiana Jones and the Temple of Doom, and Indiana Jones and the Last Crusade, while Dark Horse adapted the Indiana Jones and the Fate of Atlantis video game, The Young Indiana Jones Chronicles television series, and Indiana Jones and the Kingdom of the Crystal Skull.

Marvel also published The Further Adventures of Indiana Jones from 1983 to 1986, which were the first original adventures featuring the character in comic book form. From 1992 to 1996, following the Fate of Atlantis adaptation, Dark Horse published seven limited series. With the franchise's revival in 2008 due to the release of Kingdom of the Crystal Skull, Dark Horse published further series, including one aimed at children.

== Marvel Comics ==
=== 1980s ===
In 1981, Marvel Comics published a three-issue adaptation of Raiders of the Lost Ark. In January 1983, the character was given his own monthly series, named The Further Adventures of Indiana Jones, which ran for 34 issues until March 1986. The series featured Marcus Brody and Marion Ravenwood in regular supporting roles, with appearances by Sallah, Katanga, and Short Round as well. A three-issue adaptation of Indiana Jones and the Temple of Doom and a four-issue adaptation of Indiana Jones and the Last Crusade were also published.

The series is notable for having developed its own continuity, adding original content and characters to pre-existing Indiana Jones mythology, with villains such as rival archeologist Ian McIver and Ali Ben Ayoob, a Levantine tycoon employing Ishmaelite assassins as agents.

Dark Horse reprinted the Raiders adaptation and the first 12 issues of The Further Adventures on February 18, 2009. A second omnibus volume followed on September 23, 2009, reprinting issues #13-24 and the Temple of Doom adaptation and a third volume on February 24, 2010 reprinted the final ten issues and the Last Crusade adaptation.

== Dark Horse Comics ==
=== 1990s ===
Dark Horse Comics published a bimonthly four-issue adaptation of the Indiana Jones and the Fate of Atlantis computer game by William Messner-Loebs and Dan Barry from March to September 1991. From 1992 the following original series were published:

- Indiana Jones and the Shrine of the Sea Devil (written and penciled by Gary Gianni, published in issues three to six of the Dark Horse Comics anthology series from October 1992 to January 1993, and reprinted as a one-shot in September 1994).
- Indiana Jones: Thunder in the Orient (six issues written and penciled by Dan Barry (though the sixth was drawn by Dan Spiegle), published from September to December 1993, and then March and April 1994).
- Indiana Jones and the Arms of Gold (four issues written by Lee Marrs and penciled by Leo Durañona, published from February to May 1994).
- Indiana Jones and the Golden Fleece (two issues written by Pat McGreal and Dave Rawson, and penciled by Ken Hooper, published in June and July 1994).
- Indiana Jones and the Iron Phoenix (four issues written by Lee Marrs and penciled by Leo Durañona, published from December 1994 to March 1995).
- Indiana Jones and the Spear of Destiny (four issues written by Elaine Lee and penciled by Dan Spiegle, published from April to July 1995).
- Indiana Jones and the Sargasso Pirates (four issues written and drawn by Karl Kesel (with Paul Guinan and Eduardo Barreto co-penciling the first and fourth issues respectively), published from December 1995 to March 1996).

A series based on The Young Indiana Jones Chronicles television series, written by Dan Barry, began in February 1992 and lasted a year. The twelve issues retold the 'Curse of the Jackal' pilot followed by six of the show's first season episodes. Barry drew the first three and the last four issues of that series, while Gray Morrow drew issues three to six, and Gordon Purcell drew the seventh and eighth issues.

Sales of the later series were poor, which resulted in the cancellation of Pete Ford and Hugh Fleming's Indiana Jones and the Lost Horizon. It would have explored Indiana's friendship with Abner Ravenwood in 1926. In February 2008, Fate of Atlantis, Thunder in the Orient and Arms of Gold were collected into an omnibus. The rest was collected together in June.

=== 2000s ===
An adaptation of Indiana Jones and the Kingdom of the Crystal Skull, written by John Jackson Miller and penciled in by Luke Ross, came out in May 2008. The following month, an ongoing children's series entitled Indiana Jones Adventures began, which is modeled after Clone Wars Adventures. The first volume, set in 1930, involves Norse mythology while Indiana travels to Sweden and Marrakesh. It was followed by a Free Comic Book Day six-page story titled Indiana Jones and the Temple of Yearning and a second volume of Indiana Jones Adventures, both published in 2009. The four-issue Indiana Jones and the Tomb of the Gods (written by Rob Williams and penciled by Steve Scott were published between June 2008 and March 2009.

Indiana Jones and Short Round cameo in the Star Wars story "Into the Great Unknown" in Star Wars Tales #19 (2004), where they find the wreck of the Millennium Falcon and the body of Han Solo while searching for the Sasquatch, who is in fact Chewbacca.

=== Reception ===
Kevin Powers of Comics Bulletin gave Fate of Atlantis, Thunder in the Orient and Arms of Gold positive reviews. He found Fate of Atlantis a "darker, more fast-paced" adaptation of the game, but that it still captured Indiana and Sophia Hapgood's relationship. He also argued, "the parallel between the downfall of Atlantis and the downfall of the Nazi searchers is really well done". There was "hell of a lot going on in" Thunder in the Orient, "but it's fairly easy to follow and the political connotations are very well documented". He compared it and Arms of Gold to Indiana Jones and the Temple of Doom because of its focus on action over characterization, although he deemed the latter "perfect for someone looking for a well-crafted adventure story". He praised its romantic elements, but found the villain an afterthought.

Powers found Dan Barry's art for the first two Dark Horse series "cartoonish, [but] it definitely suits the feeling of Indiana Jones. Barry did an excellent job capturing the action and adventure aspects of Indy as well as the supernatural. The representations of Atlantis were extremely well done and remain consistent throughout the book". He preferred Dan Spiegle's artwork in the last issue of Thunder in the Orient as "it's edgier, rugged and has a more 'realistic' and old-school type artwork that is very well suited to Indiana Jones". He felt Leo Durañona's art for Arms of Gold was "decent, but a bit inconsistent. He goes for the 'rugged' Indiana Jones look, but the inconsistencies in the art from page to page are a bit noticeable".

The website's reception of the Kingdom of the Crystal Skull adaptation was poor, arguing it "reads like a summary of a story, not like a story", and that John Jackson Miller's writing was "lacking". The only highpoint was the art from Luke Ross and Fabio Laguna which "runs the gamut from decent to fantastic". They acclaimed the rest of 2008's comics (the first issue of Tomb of the Gods and volume one of Indiana Jones Adventures), particularly their art. Powers, in his review of the limited series, felt "Harrison Ford from Raiders jumped off the screen and into a comic book [and his Marcus Brody is the spitting image of Denholm Elliott". In the latter series, he still found the simpler depiction of Belloq "amazingly just like Paul Freeman".

== International comics ==
Titan Magazines began publishing the Indiana Jones Comic in the United Kingdom on May 22, 2008.

A series of three hardcover albums by writer Claude Moliterni and artist Giancarlo Alessandrini was published in France by the Bagheera publishing house.

== Collected editions ==
A number of the stories have been collected into trade paperbacks:

- Indiana Jones Omnibus:
  - Volume 1 (352 pages, Dark Horse, February 2008, ISBN 1-59307-887-0, Titan Books, March 2008, ISBN 1-84576-806-X)
    - Reprints the Dark Horse miniseries Fate of Atlantis (1991), Thunder in the Orient (1993), and The Arms of Gold (1994).
  - Volume 2 (384 pages, Dark Horse, June 2008, ISBN 1-59307-953-2, Titan Books, July 2008, ISBN 1-84576-807-8)
    - Reprints the Dark Horse miniseries The Golden Fleece (1994), The Iron Phoenix (1994), The Spear of Destiny (1995) and The Sargasso Pirates (1995), plus the 1-shot The Shrine of the Sea Devil (1994).
- Indiana Jones Omnibus: Further Adventures:
  - Volume 1 (368 pages, Dark Horse, February 2009, ISBN 1-59582-246-1, Titan Books, April 2009, ISBN 1-84576-808-6)
    - Reprints the Marvel Comics Raiders of the Lost Ark miniseries (1981), and The Further Adventures of Indiana Jones issues 1-12 (1983).
  - Volume 2 (368 pages, Dark Horse, November 2009, ISBN 1-59582-336-0, Titan Books, November 2009, ISBN 1-84856-332-9)
    - Reprints the Marvel Comics Indiana Jones and the Temple of Doom miniseries (1984), and The Further Adventures of Indiana Jones issues 13-24 (1984).
  - Volume 3 (368 pages, Dark Horse, March 2010, ISBN 1-59582-437-5)
    - Reprints the Marvel Comics The Further Adventures of Indiana Jones issues 25-34 (1985-86), and Indiana Jones and the Last Crusade miniseries (1989).

The entire Marvel Comics run has been reprinted into hardcover deluxe editions:

- Indiana Jones: The Further Adventures Book I (528 Pages, Marvel Universe, September 2026, ISBN 978-1-302-97027-7)
  - Reprints the Marvel Comics Marvel Super Special (1977) #18, #30, Raiders of the Lost Ark miniseries (1981), Indiana Jones and the Temple of Doom miniseries (1984), and The Further Adventures of Indiana Jones issues 1-16 (1983-1984).
- Indiana Jones: The Further Adventures Book II (512 Pages, Marvel Universe, September 2026, ISBN 978-1-302-97028-4)
  - Reprints the Marvel Comics Indiana Jones and the Last Crusade miniseries (1989) and The Further Adventures of Indiana Jones issues 17-34 (1984-86).
