= Indiana Jones and the Infernal Machine =

1999 action-adventure video game

- Package illustration by Drew Struzan
- Developers: LucasArts; Factor 5 (N64)
- Publishers: LucasArts; THQ (GBC)
- Director: Hal Barwood
- Producer: Wayne Cline
- Designer: Hal Barwood
- Artist: William Tiller
- Writer: Hal Barwood
- Composer: Clint Bajakian
- Platforms: Microsoft Windows; Nintendo 64; Game Boy Color
- Release: Windows: NA: November 15, 1999; EU: November 25, 1999; Nintendo 64: NA: December 15, 2000; Game Boy Color: NA: March 27, 2001; EU: May 5, 2001
- Genre: Action-adventure
- Mode: Single-player

Indiana Jones and the Infernal Machine is a 1999 action-adventure video game developed and published by LucasArts. The first 3D installment in the series, its gameplay focuses on solving puzzles, fighting enemies, and completing various platforming sections. The story is set in 1947, after the events of Indiana Jones and the Iron Phoenix, and puts the eponymous protagonist, the adventurer Indiana Jones, against the Soviet Union. In a race for a mythological Babylonian power source, he joins forces with the Central Intelligence Agency and collects four pieces of the Infernal Machine, an ancient device that allegedly opens a portal to another dimension.

The title was designed, written, and directed by Hal Barwood, who considered the Indiana Jones franchise a perfect fit for the action-adventure genre. Initially developed for the Microsoft Windows operating systems, the game later received an enhanced Nintendo 64 port jointly developed with Factor 5 and released exclusively in North America, as well as a 2D version for the Game Boy Color developed by HotGen. Infernal Machine received generally favorable reviews, having been praised for its detailed storyline and sophisticated level designs, though widely criticized for its unwieldy control scheme.

== Gameplay ==
A third-person action-adventure, the camera of Infernal Machine is constantly placed behind the playable character. The heads-up display in the bottom left corner is limited to a health indicator.

Infernal Machine is an action-adventure and, as such, features a hybrid of various gameplay mechanics. The player sees Indiana Jones from a third-person perspective and controls him through 17 levels of a fully polygonal 3D world. A recurring element of Infernal Machine are platforming sections, for which a combination of running, jumping, climbing, and the use of the protagonist's trademark bullwhip is required. Furthermore, several human, animal and supernatural enemies are encountered during the course of the game, which the player can fight off with numerous firearms, the aforementioned whip, and a machete. In addition to these obstacles, the game largely focuses on solving puzzles and discovering treasures. Some levels include vehicle-themed portions such as rafting, jeep treks, and mine cart chases. The main objective of the game is to collect four machine parts in order to complete the titular Infernal Machine.

== Plot ==
The story of the game is set in 1947 and depicts archaeologist and adventurer Indiana Jones returning to his digging career after his involvement in World War II. Sophia Hapgood, an old friend of Jones and a member of the Central Intelligence Agency, visits him at his dig site in the Canyonlands, and informs him that the Soviets are excavating the ruins of Babylon. Led by Dr. Gennadi Volodnikov, a physicist interested in alternate dimensions, the Soviets' objective is to find a weapon more powerful than the nuclear bomb, giving them a decisive advantage in the Cold War.

Sophia hires Jones to investigate what exactly the Soviets are searching for, and he travels to their dig site in the Kingdom of Iraq. There, he joins up with Sophia's boss Simon Turner and finds out that Volodnikov is looking for the Babylonian god Marduk who lives on another plane called the Aetherium. Deep in the ruins of the Etemenanki, Jones translates ancient cuneiform tablets revealing the true story behind the Tower of Babel: 2600 years ago, Nebuchadnezzar II was inspired by Marduk to build a great engine, but the frightened Babylonians tore the tower housing it down, leading four of the god's disciples to escape with some parts of this "Infernal Machine".

Jones embarks on a journey to find the four machine parts before the Soviets do, and retrieves them from a monastery in the mountains of the Kazakh Soviet Socialist Republic, an active volcano on Palawan in the Philippines, an Olmec valley in Mexico (briefly being captured by the Soviets and taken to a ship in the waters of the Canary Islands at the end of it), and a tomb near Meroë in the deserts of Anglo-Egyptian Sudan. He is confronted by Volodnikov and Turner who both demand him to hand over the parts as they think they would not be safe with the other side. Untrusting of his fellow Americans, but opting for the lesser evil, he gives the parts to Sophia and Turner. Volodnikov says that it was probably better this way, as Marduk would have his revenge on those who desecrated the machine.

Alarmed, Jones returns to the Room of the Tablets in Babylon, and finds a now-opened gate leading further into the ruins, to the core of the Infernal Machine. He catches up with Sophia and Turner, the latter of which intends to convince the other dimension to cooperate with the United States, and uses the machine parts to activate the engine. Turner pushes the unwilling Sophia into a mystical cage as a means of sending her to the Aetherium as an ambassador. Jones sees no other way but to kill him to reclaim all parts and rescue her. However, the activated machine goes awry, and Jones and Sophia are sucked into a portal that leads to the other dimension. There, he defeats the malevolent Marduk and frees Sophia from her cage. Having escaped back to Babylon, the team is greeted by Volodnikov, who is curious to find out if they encountered God on the other side, which Jones denies. In the ensuing conversation, the Soviet doctor turns out less extremist than assumed, and the three wander off into the sunrise in search of a good bottle of vodka. A bonus level sees Jones return to the Peruvian temple from the opening of the film Raiders of the Lost Ark, discovering another golden idol in a secret room.

== Development ==
Each version of the game was developed around the same ideas. Indy begins his adventure in all three versions; PC, Nintendo 64, and Game Boy Color, by sliding down a slope and proceeding to the character's right across the edge of a cliff. His weapons in all three versions also function in the same way.

Infernal Machine project leader, designer and writer Hal Barwood always thought of Indiana Jones as an action hero. Based on this notion, he decided for the game to be an action-adventure, as he was particularly fond of the genre and its use of 3D worlds. Barwood also considered the Nazis to be overused as villains in the series and so instead set the title in the Cold War era with Russians as the antagonists. Originally, UFOs were planned to be used as a plot device, though George Lucas vetoed the idea, still reserving it for a then undeveloped fourth installment. In lieu thereof, Barwood became interested in ancient technology like the Antikythera mechanism, conceived the Infernal Machine as the MacGuffin, and placed it in the biblical Tower of Babel, which is believed to be identical with the Etemenanki, a temple dedicated to the god Marduk.

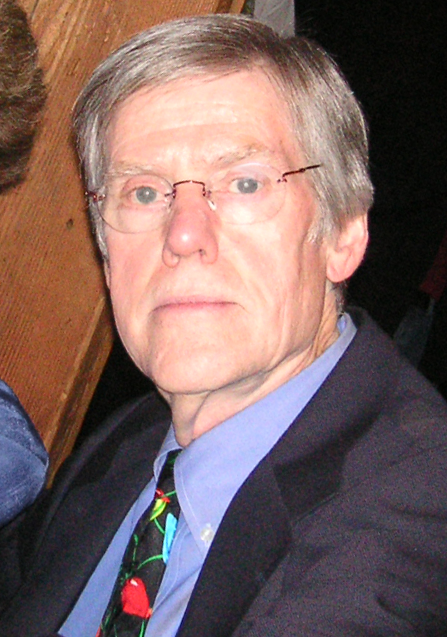
Hal Barwood, who had previously worked on the LucasArts adventure game Indiana Jones and the Fate of Atlantis, returned as project leader, designer and writer for Infernal Machine.

Developed for Windows 95 and 98, the game uses a modified version of the Sith engine adapted for a third-person view by lead programmer Paul LeFevre. Eventually, lighting, collision, rendering and tools underwent drastic rewrites to the point that the code was renamed the Jones engine. The levels were principally designed by Steven Chen, and later conceptualized with illustrations by lead artist William Tiller. Multiplayer support was planned at the beginning of the development, but ultimately dropped because it turned out to be too complex to adequately test. Instead, more emphasis was put on the design of the single-player campaign with its puzzles and exploring aspect. The team implemented a hint system to lead players in the right direction. Additionally, the score system from previous Indiana Jones games, the Indy Quotient, makes a return. Apart from John Williams' "Raiders March", the soundtrack was newly composed by Clint Bajakian and consists of about 130 original pieces. Dubbed European language versions of the fully voice-acted game were released by THQ in Germany, Ubisoft in France, Electronic Arts in Spain and CTO in Italy.

An intended PlayStation version was canceled early after the game's announcement. However, a team of eight Factor 5 employees teamed up with artists, level designers and a programmer from LucasArts to port Infernal Machine to the Nintendo 64. Development of this version commenced in early March 1999 and was finished in October 2000. Over the course of these 19 months, several improvements were made to the game, such as enhanced real-time lighting, controls, camera and particle systems, as well as added lock-on targeting and assigning items to three of the C buttons of the Nintendo 64 controller. Furthermore, the N64 version has some new musical pieces composed by Chris Hülsbeck, and employs sequenced music as opposed to the prerecorded audio from the PC original. The port was only released in North America and was exclusive to the LucasArts Company Store, a majority of the stock being distributed for rental at the Blockbuster chain of stores. Electronic Arts planned to release it in Europe, but the title then saw a change of publisher to THQ. Originally scheduled for March 2001, the PAL version became subject to continuous monthly delays and was eventually cancelled in September 2001. A Dreamcast port was announced for a fall 2000 release but this was also cancelled. A 2D version of Infernal Machine with top-down perspective gameplay was developed for the Game Boy Color by HotGen also in early 2001.

In October 2018, GOG.com re-released Indiana Jones and the Infernal Machine as a downloadable game for personal computers. In November, the game was released through Steam.

== Reception ==
Reception

Aggregate scores
Aggregator	Score		
Aggregator	GBC	N64	PC
GameRankings	74%	71%	74%
Metacritic	N/A	75/100	N/A

Review scores
Publication	Score		
Publication	GBC	N64	PC
CNET Gamecenter	N/A	6/10	5/10
Computer Gaming World	N/A	N/A	3/5
Electronic Gaming Monthly	N/A	6.83/10 (Note: Three critics of Electronic Gaming Monthly gave the Nintendo 64 version each a score of 8/10, 6.5/10, and 6/10.)	N/A
Eurogamer	N/A	N/A	9/10
Game Informer	N/A	6.75/10	8/10
GameFan	N/A	N/A	97%
GameRevolution	N/A	N/A	C−
GameSpot	6.9/10	6/10	6.3/10
GameSpy	N/A	N/A	82%
IGN	N/A	8/10	7.8/10
Next Generation	N/A	N/A	3/5
Nintendo Power	3/5	7.8/10	N/A
PC Accelerator	N/A	N/A	5/10
PC Gamer (US)	N/A	N/A	76%
Maxim	N/A	3/5	N/A

Award
Publication	Award
GameSpot	Most Disappointing Game of the Year (nomination)

Reviewing the PC version, although some critics found it to be too similar to Tomb Raider, the game was noted for setting itself apart from the aforementioned series due to being based on the Indiana Jones franchise, and relying more heavily on puzzle-solving. Tal Blevins of IGN commended the game for its intricate and intriguing storyline. Keith Ellis of Eurogamer shared the opinion and stated the plot to be "excellently woven", enhancing the feel of "being part of a big blockbuster movie". Ellis, Blevins, and Mark Hill of PC Zone also praised Infernal Machine for its levels, calling them "excellently designed" and including "some of the most brilliant layouts [...] seen in a game of this type". While Blevins thought the variety of puzzles provided was sufficient and applauded the inclusion of a hint system, Michael E. Ryan of GameSpot found many of the puzzles in the game to focus too heavily on platforming and went on to state that they become "quite repetitive - even predictable" after the first few levels. The most criticized aspect of the PC game across the majority of reviews, however, are the controls. Ellis described them as "infuriating at times", mostly due to their faulty collision detection when performing certain actions. Ryan thought the control system was too jerky, unresponsive, and unnecessarily slow because of delays between the moves.

The graphics, while low on polygons, were received well for its detailed textures and the diverse locations presented. Ellis called Infernal Machine "one of the best looking third person adventures", and applauded the in-engine cutscenes, claiming them to be "bordering on film quality at times". Ryan said the graphics were "not exactly cutting edge", but "generally quite good" due to the "fairly smooth and convincing" animations. Blevins praised the environments for having "a lot more personality than the Tomb Raider series". Ellis called some of the locations "simply stunning", and Ryan found the levels to be "aesthetically well designed because of convincing architecture and wall decorations". Furthermore, the soundtrack was stated by Blevins to be "one of the best features of the game", based on its adding to the dramatic impact along the way. He applauded the voice recording for being "crisp and clean", though he was disappointed with the sparsity of musical tracks and environmental sound effects. Jonathan Sutyak of AllGame was impressed with the weapon effects and the foreign-language voice overs for the Soviet soldiers, while Hill considered the lack of Harrison Ford as Indiana Jones' voice disappointing, though understandable given his high salary. Ellis found the comments of the playable character to become annoying after a while, but was impressed with the ambient sounds and music, claiming the latter to be "ace stuff", "further enhancing the motion picture feeling of the game". Tom Russo of NextGen, however, said, "Despite a fantastic storyline, the execution just doesn't merit a higher rating."

Peter Silk of Adventure Gamer said that it was "in my opinion the best attempt yet to make adventure games appeal to a mainstream audience because it does not achieve this by 'dumbing-down' the plot or puzzles for action fans. It merely uses action as an added element. It is this that makes the game a classic and a worthy addition to the Indy series. I loved every moment from start to finish, and rest assured there is a lot of game in between start and finish!" Boba Fatt of GamePro said that the game "may be a direct copy of Tomb Raider, but Indy fans will be pleased with this whip-wielding, idol-grabbing, raft-riding roller coaster adventure that fits perfectly in the vein of the famed archaeologist's cinematic spectacles." Thomas Crymes said of the PC version in another review, "If you find the Tomb Raider games an exercise in frustration, then you might want to skip this one. But fans of those games will have a great time with Indiana Jones and the Infernal Machine's addictive game play and interesting puzzles. The man in the hat is back to reclaim the role he never should have lost." Jason Lambert of GameZone said "If you loved playing Tomb Raider and you really loved the Indiana Jones movie series, then you will love this game. With Christmas coming soon, this should be in every gamer's stocking." Eliot Fish of Hyper wrote "The sound in Infernal Machine is great, the graphics are a bit of a mixture of wonderful and horrid, and I'm saddened to say that the gameplay is quite average. Indy fans will still enjoy the experience to some degree (I did have some fun) if you can put up with all the game engine flaws." Neil Harris of The Electric Playground called it "a must-have for any fan of the third person action-adventure game." However, Edge said that the rating "reflects its worth to players who have the patience to brave its inadequacies." Tom Chick of Computer Games Strategy Plus called it "A tedious, frustrating, flat-chested, wisecracking Tomb Raider who's nothing like the Indiana Jones that you know and love."

Despite its enhancements, the Nintendo 64 version fared about as well with critics as the PC original, receiving "generally favorable reviews" according to the review aggregation website Metacritic. The control scheme of the port was well received by Matt Casamassina of IGN for the addition of C button item management and Z-targeting, both inspired by Ocarina of Time. Though Casamassina still considered the controls "slow" and "a little clunky", he commended them for being "more intuitive, tighter, speedier, and all around more balanced" than those of the PC version. Joe Fielder of GameSpot did not share these sentiments and stated the adaptation of the keyboard controls to the console controller to be "rather clunky and unintuitive". Casamassina was impressed with the texture work and lighting, and found the title to be "one of the prettiest" on the Nintendo 64, even more so by employing the Expansion Pak to achieve high-resolution graphics. Despite its praise, the graphics received criticism for its "wooden" character animations, occasional frame rate drops, and bugs such as pop-ups and faulty texture placement. Casamassina remarked that the sound was superior to the PC version's, while Fielder thought it was about on par with the port's above-average graphics. Additionally, Fielder criticized the Nintendo 64 version for the many bugs and lockups, a problem uncommon for console releases. Hyper's Fish wrote "Whilst Infernal Machine isn't the greatest third-person action adventure, it's certainly a nice one to add to your N64 collection. If you can brave the flaws, there's a satisfying experience to be had with Dr. Jones." Jes Bickham of N64 Magazine called it "a polished Tomb Raider." Jules Grant of The Electric Playground wrote that it was "better tomb raiding fare than Lara Croft's adventures, and console-wise, it's only available for Nintendo 64--tell your Sony loving friends to sit that in their CD tray and rotate." Uncle Dust of GamePro said, "The controls have received a good overhaul since the PC version's, and they work very smoothly – you'll basically be Lara Croft with a whip. The N64's twitchy analog stick causes some accuracy problems, but, overall, Machine provides perfect Indy-style adventure fun."

Reviewing the Game Boy Color version, Suzi Sez of GameZone wrote "This game is not for the faint-hearted! Fast-paced action will greet you on the very first scene and will follow you throughout the perilous journey to find the Infernal Machine! Don't hesitate or you may find yourself...very dead!" Extreme Ahab of GamePro said of the game, "If you crack your whip for this one, prepare for enjoyable action and a bit of brainwork." On the other hand, Frank Provo of GameSpot panned it for its backtracking, missing puzzle hints, and lack of plot development, but lauded for its clean animations and sound effects. Nick Woods of AllGame was disappointed with the instruction manual being mandatory to understand the game's mostly non-existent plot, and criticized the decision to make the player restart a level upon dying, as well as the password system, calling it "annoying". Nintendo Power compared it to the N64 version saying it that it has much depth and far fewer control problems, and described it more as a puzzle game.
