= Dan Heilman =

American artist

Dan Heilman (1922 – December 17, 1966) was the first artist of the Judge Parker comic strip. He was born in 1922 (some sources say 1924) in Cincinnati, Ohio.

Having served in World War II, Heilman became an assistant to artist Ken Ernst on the Mary Worth comic strip, and to Roy Crane on Buz Sawyer. In 1949 he was the artist for a comic strip called The American Adventure.

In 1952 writer Dr. Nicholas Dallis hired Heilman for Judge Parker, which made its debut on 24 November of that year. Heilman stayed with Judge Parker until 1965, when he left and was succeeded by his assistant Harold LeDoux.

Heilman was working on a new outer-space-themed comic when he died in Lauderdale-by-the-Sea, Florida on December 17, 1966.
