= Indiana Jones and the Iron Phoenix =

Dark Horse Comics limited series

- Trade paperback cover

Publication information
- Publisher: Dark Horse Comics
- Schedule: Monthly
- Format: Limited series
- Publication date: December 1994 to March 1995
- No. of issues: Four

Creative team
- Created by: George Lucas
- Written by: Lee Marrs
- Penciller: Leo Durañona

Indiana Jones and the Iron Phoenix is a Dark Horse Comics limited series starring the fictional archaeologist Indiana Jones. It was the seventh Indiana Jones limited series by Dark Horse, and the sixth about the adult Indiana. The comic was based on a canceled LucasArts video game, a sequel to Fate of Atlantis (which was also the first Dark Horse Indiana Jones comic).

== Plot ==
The comic is set after World War II, with the Nazis seeking the Philosopher's Stone in an attempt to resurrect dead Nazis. Along with the beautiful Russian major Nadia, Indiana Jones gathers the pieces of the philosopher's stone.

== Development ==
The reasons for the game's cancellation included the clash between the drawing styles of the characters (art deco) and of the background (realistic), the retiring from the project of Aric Wilmunder, the main programmer, and finally, the problems with distribution in Germany, where censorship laws prohibit the sale of any products with explicit depictions of Nazi symbols. Earlier games could get away easily by simply removing the Nazi flags and references to them, but this could not be done with this game, as they were an important part of the plot and Hitler was featured as a central villain.

After this game, LucasArts briefly considered making a game named Spear of Destiny (involving the spear of Longinus). They eventually abandoned the idea of creating a classical adventure game in the Indiana Jones series, instead focusing on Tomb Raider-style 3D action games, beginning with the release of Indiana Jones and the Infernal Machine, followed by Indiana Jones and the Emperor's Tomb and Indiana Jones and the Staff of Kings.

== Comic book ==
Even though the game was canceled, Dark Horse Comics released a four-part comic book series based upon the game's script. A comic book was also created for the canceled game Indiana Jones and the Spear of Destiny.
