= Judge Parker =

American comic strip

- Harold LeDoux's Judge Parker (January 10, 1967)
- Author(s): Nicholas P. Dallis (1952–1990); Woody Wilson (1990–2016); Francesco Marciuliano (2016-present)
- Illustrator(s): Dan Heilman (1952–1965); Harold LeDoux (1965–2006); Eduardo Barreto (2006–2010); Mike Manley (2010–present)
- Website: comicskingdom.com/judge-parker
- Current status/schedule: Current daily & Sunday strip
- Launch date: November 24, 1952; 73 years ago
- Syndicate(s): (current) King Features Syndicate (formerly) Publishers Syndicate (1952–1967); Publishers-Hall Syndicate / Field Newspaper Syndicate / News America Syndicate / North America Syndicate (1967–1988)
- Genre: Soap opera

Judge Parker is an American soap opera-style comic strip created by Nicholas P. Dallis that first appeared on November 24, 1952. The strip's look and content were influenced by the work of Allen Saunders and Ken Ernst on Mary Worth.

== Characters and story ==
Alan Parker was a widower and a judge with two children, Randy and Ann. Later, Judge Parker married a younger woman, Katherine. Initially a dashing figure who solved crimes and chased criminals, Parker became an upstanding and serious judge who rarely strayed from his courtroom during the 1960s. Instead, the spotlight began to focus on handsome, successful young attorney Sam Driver, and Parker was almost entirely phased out of his own strip.

The strip is set in the community of Cavelton. Most stories revolve around Driver, his wealthy client and now-wife Abbey Spencer, and their two adopted children: volatile Neddy and her traumatized younger sister, Sophie. The family lives with their maid Marie at Spencer Farms, where Abbey raises Arabian horses. Some of the cast may not be seen for some time because Judge Parker stories tend to be long; an apparent week in the plot may last for months in publication time. Alan's son Randy, now grown, is Driver's law partner, and a 2006 storyline focused on Randy's campaign for the judicial seat from which his father is retiring, ensuring that the "Judge Parker" name will continue. The February 15, 2009, strip stated that Randy would be "the new Judge Parker." On April 4, 2023, Neddy's friend Veronica Peña married Katherine Bryson.

== Artists ==
Diego Barreto's Judge Parker (February 28, 2010)

Dallis, a psychiatrist who also created the comic strips Apartment 3-G and Rex Morgan, M.D., used the pen name "Paul Nichols" when writing the strip. Shortly before his death, he retired in 1990, turning over the scripting chores to his assistant Woody Wilson.

The strip's first artist was Dan Heilman, who left in 1965 and was replaced by Harold LeDoux. Under LeDoux, the characters gradually (and gracefully) aged. LeDoux's last strip ran on May 28, 2006.

Comic book artist Eduardo Barreto replaced him; his first strip appeared the following day. Barreto suffered a near-fatal injury in a car accident in Uruguay shortly afterwards and was unable to illustrate the strips for December 2006; as a result, Rex Morgan artist Graham Nolan did the strip for a week, and John Heebink took over the following week. Barreto resumed drawing the strip in January 2007. Barreto fell "gravely ill" from meningitis in early February 2010 and had to withdraw from drawing the strip for "the foreseeable future". Barreto's son Diego drew the strip for the week beginning February 8, 2010, with John Heebink stepping in again on February 15, 2010, for four weeks while Barreto recovered.

Artist Mike Manley assumed the art duties permanently, beginning with the strip for March 15, 2010. Initially announced as another fill-in artist, Manley revealed on February 23, 2010, that he'd been given the ongoing assignment. The syndicate held a "two-man tryout", with Manley being offered the full-time job over Heebink after Manley turned in his second week of art for the strip. Following Woody Wilson's retirement, Francesco Marciuliano became writer as of August 22, 2016. Marciuliano has given the strip a darker tone.
