= Lex Luthor: The Unauthorized Biography =

1989 comic book storyline

Lex Luthor: The Unauthorized Biography is a 48‑page one‑shot comic book published by DC Comics in 1989. Written by James D. Hudnall, with pencils by Eduardo Barreto and inks by Adam Kubert, it presents a noir‑tinged origin story of Superman's arch‑enemy Lex Luthor through the lens of a down‑and‑out reporter investigating his rise to power.

The comic book has been ranked #33 in Wizard Magazine's list of "100 Best Single Issue Comics Since You Were Born".

The cover design is similar to the cover of Donald Trump's autobiography The Art of the Deal.

== Publication history ==
DC Comics released Lex Luthor: The Unauthorized Biography as a standalone special in 1989, commemorating a trend toward more mature, character‑driven Superman stories. It was later reprinted in the Superman: President Luthor collected edition and made available digitally via DC Universe Infinite.

== Creators ==
- Writer: James D. Hudnall
- Artist: Eduardo Barreto
- Inker: Adam Kubert

== Synopsis ==
The story is framed by a police interrogation of Clark Kent, accused of murdering tabloid journalist Peter Sands. Through flashback, Sands recounts how he was hired to write a tell‑all biography of Lex Luthor, Metropolis's billionaire CEO. As Sands interviews Luthor's childhood teacher, former employees, and ex‑girlfriend, he uncovers a pattern of deception and violence.

He discovers that Luthor grew up poor and abused in Metropolis's worst slum. At age 13, he forged his father's signature on a life‑insurance policy and sabotaged the family car to kill his parents and finance his future. Using his ill‑gotten gains, Luthor established LexCorp, crushing competitors through intimidation and blackmail.

Sands faces increasingly violent warnings to drop his investigation. His obsession drives him into paranoia, leading him to seek Superman's protection—too late to save his own life.

The narrative closes with Kent's arrest and hints at Luthor's warning that Superman's friends will be used against him—underscoring Luthor's intellectual superiority over his nemesis.
