= Tinkerer (Marvel Comics) =

Fictional character, adversary of Spider-Man

- The Tinkerer (Phineas Mason) from the Official Handbook of the Marvel Universe Deluxe Edition. Art by Peter Poplaski.

Publication information
- Publisher: Marvel Comics
- First appearance: The Amazing Spider-Man #2 (May 1963)
- Created by: Stan Lee; Steve Ditko

In-story information
- Alter ego: Phineas Mason
- Species: Human
- Team affiliations: Masters of Evil
- Notable aliases: The Terrible Tinkerer; Hophni Mason
- Abilities: Genius-level intellect; Proficient scientist and engineer

The Tinkerer (Phineas Mason) is a character appearing in American comic books published by Marvel Comics. He is usually depicted as a supervillain and an adversary of the superhero Spider-Man, as well as the father of Rick Mason. The character was created by Stan Lee and Steve Ditko, and made his first appearance in The Amazing Spider-Man #2 (May 1963).

The Tinkerer is portrayed as a genius in engineering who can create gadgets and other devices from nothing more than spare parts left over from ordinary household appliances. While in his initial appearances he sought to personally eliminate Spider-Man, later storylines would have him under the employ of other supervillains, whom he supplies with his devices for their personal vendettas against Spider-Man or other heroes.

Since his introduction in comics, the character has been adapted into several other forms of media, such as animated television series and video games. The Tinkerer made his live-action debut in the Marvel Cinematic Universe (MCU) film Spider-Man: Homecoming (2017), portrayed by Michael Chernus. Additionally, an original incarnation named Phin Mason appeared in the video game Spider-Man: Miles Morales (2020), voiced by Jasmin Savoy Brown.

== Publication history ==
The Tinkerer was created by Stan Lee and Steve Ditko, and made his first appearance in The Amazing Spider-Man #2 (April 1963), opposing Spider-Man as a villain. It would, however, be several years before he would return, and made his second appearance in The Amazing Spider-Man #160 (September 1976), once again opposing Spider-Man in a losing effort. The Tinkerer would next be mentioned in The Amazing Spider-Man #182 (July 1978). This was his first mention in the publication as a supporting character aiding the other villains.

== Fictional character biography ==
Phineas Mason is a brilliant inventor and technician who designs advanced weaponry for criminals and sometimes undertakes crimes of his own. As "the Terrible Tinkerer", he runs an underground fix-it shop disguised as a radio repair shop. On at least one occasion, a potential customer gained the inventor's attention by presenting a transistor radio and telling Mason that "I've got a radio that just can't carry a tune". The Tinkerer's original scheme involved the employment of a team of petty has-been stuntmen and thugs. They specialized in placing bugs into radios and blackmailing state officials and politicians.

Since he is a small business operator who works alone (and arms criminals), the Tinkerer takes precautions to prevent being cheated. For instance, Killer Shrike commissioned Tinkerer to improve his weapon gauntlets. At delivery time, Killer Shrike decided to use the weapons to threaten the inventor and avoid paying. The gauntlets backfired on Killer Shrike due to a failsafe created by Tinkerer and implemented into his products for such situations.

Tinkerer's son Rick Mason is a world-class mercenary for the American government and freelance operative. Despite the two being on opposite sides of the law, father and son remained on good terms and met frequently. Tinkerer even aided Rick from time to time, and once provided his son with information about a coup in South America. After Rick was seemingly killed in action, the grief-stricken father decided to mend his ways while still maintaining links to supervillains to give information he could discreetly pass along.

In the Secret War miniseries, Nick Fury discovers a link between the weaponry of many technology-based villains and the kingdom of Latveria. Tinkerer is revealed to have received a vast portion of his funding and presumably the resources and technology from which he has developed most of his clients' arsenals over the years from Latveria. This was part of an ongoing "terrorist" initiative fostered by Latveria's leader Doctor Doom and prime minister Lucia von Bardas. S.H.I.E.L.D. agents discover Tinkerer's workshop by using Killer Shrike as a mole. When the agents converge on the workshop, Killer Shrike is struck down by Tinkerer's security systems, while Tinkerer flees to Latveria rather than face justice.

The Punisher finds and confronts Tinkerer after a confrontation with Stilt-Man to which Tinkerer begs for death. Not only was his son dead, but his grandson died in the Stamford, Connecticut explosion that heralded the Civil War's beginning. Without his family, Tinkerer has become suicidal and continues his work in the hope that both superheroes and supervillains would wipe each other out. The Punisher stabs Tinkerer in the back, likely leaving him paralyzed. Now reliant on a wheelchair, Mason is contracted by Cyber to infuse his body with adamantium.

During the "Secret Invasion" storyline, he is freed from Prison 42 to help Human Torch, the Thing, Franklin Richards, and Valeria Richards return to the Earth dimension. It is mentioned that Mason had retired the Tinkerer identity, but he is imprisoned for breaking the Superhuman Registration Act regardless. He is initially reluctant to help his old foes, but Franklin's and Valeria's resemblance to his own grandchildren causes him to relent. It was revealed Rick is in fact still alive, under deep cover, and in a conspiracy which resulted in Carol Danvers's apparent murder for Norman Osborn in exchange for his father's release and cleared record.

Later, Phineas fabricates the identity of his own brother Hophni Mason via a robotic suit. As Hophni, he acts as a confidant of various superheroes, such as Ant-Man and Captain America, and provides technology to Teresa Parker. His façade is revealed when he uses his disguise as a battlesuit, which gets defeated by Spider-Man. However, it is revealed that the Tinkerer is acting as an ally to the Vedomi alien race of sentient A.I.s. After escaping custody, the Tinkerer (equipped with the Vedomi's battlesuit) fights Spider-Man, who realizes that the Tinkerer is sorrowful and resentful towards humanity and helps change his point of view. The Tinkerer later departs Earth alongside the Vedomi, deciding to stay with them and help guide them on a less destructive path.

== Skills and abilities ==
Phineas Mason has a genius-level intellect, with extensive knowledge in various sciences. He is capable of designing and manufacturing numerous inventions derived from pre-existing technologies. He can access a wide array of advanced devices if needed, but his old age limits his physical abilities.

== Other versions ==
=== The Amazing Spider-Man: Renew Your Vows ===
An alternate universe version of the Tinkerer appears in the "Secret Wars" tie-in The Amazing Spider-Man: Renew Your Vows. This version comes from the Battleworld domain of the Regency and retired from supervillainy to open a repair shop.

=== Marvel 2099 ===
An alternate universe version of the Tinkerer appears in Doom 2099. This version operates in the outskirts of the Ravage.

=== Spider-Ham ===
In the Spider-Ham reality, there is a striped skunk version of the Tinkerer called Stinkerer. He was defeated by Spider-Ham while the latter was the host of Captain Zooniverse.

=== Ultimate Marvel ===
An original incarnation of the Tinkerer named Elijah Stern appears in Ultimate Spider-Man. Created by Brian Michael Bendis and Mark Bagley and designed to resemble Paul Giamatti, this version previously worked for Roxxon before he was fired after discovering a way to use vibranium as a power source. After Spider-Man thwarts his plan to assassinate his former employer Donald Roxxon, Stern goes on to join S.H.I.E.L.D. as an alternative to death. Sterns is later killed by the Prowler.

Additionally, a version of Phineas Mason appears as a scientific prodigy associated with a U.S. government think tank called Nursery Two.

== In other media ==
=== Television ===
- The Phineas Mason incarnation of the Tinkerer appears in The Spectacular Spider-Man, voiced by Thom Adcox-Hernandez.
- The Phineas Mason incarnation of the Tinkerer appears in Spider-Man (2017), voiced by Aaron Abrams. This version is an eccentric inventor who can create various forms of machinery from everyday appliances, primarily for his own amusement.
- The Phineas Mason incarnation of the Tinkerer appears in Marvel Super Hero Adventures, voiced by Michael Daingerfield. This version creates toys for children that serve evil purposes.

=== Film ===
Phineas Mason appears in Spider-Man: Homecoming (2017), portrayed by Michael Chernus. Depicted around Elijah Stern's age, this version is a weapons maker and former member of a salvage company alongside Adrian Toomes, Herman Schultz and Jackson Brice before it went out of business due to interference from the Department of Damage Control. As part of their revenge scheme against the agency, Mason helps Toomes steal and repurpose leftover technology from the Avengers' battles.

=== Video games ===
- The Phineas Mason incarnation of the Tinkerer appears as the first boss of the Master System version of Spider-Man vs. The Kingpin.
- The Phineas Mason incarnation of the Tinkerer appears as a boss in Spider-Man (1995).
- The Phineas Mason incarnation of the Tinkerer appears in Spider-Man: Web of Shadows, voiced by William Utay. He is broken out of prison by Spider-Man to build a device that could counter the symbiotes invading Manhattan. In the PS2 and PSP versions, the Tinkerer is instead attempting to spread the invasion to other major cities and fights Spider-Man, who defeats him.
- The Tinkerer appears in Marvel: Ultimate Alliance 2, voiced by Philip Proctor.
- The Tinkerer appears as a boss in the Nintendo DS version of Spider-Man: Shattered Dimensions, voiced by Jim Cummings.
- The Tinkerer appears as a playable character and mini-boss in Lego Marvel Super Heroes 2, voiced by Kevin Coello.
- An original, female incarnation of the Tinkerer loosely based on Phineas Mason, named Phin Mason, appears as the final boss of Marvel's Spider-Man: Miles Morales, voiced by Jasmin Savoy Brown. This version is African American and much younger than traditional depictions, as well as the childhood best friend of Miles Morales. After her older brother Rick Mason died trying to expose Roxxon's corruption, Phin develops a vendetta against the company. She secretly joins a criminal group called the Underground, whom she supplies with her advanced programmable matter technology, and eventually becomes the group's leader and public face, known as the Tinkerer. As the Tinkerer and the Underground wage war on Roxxon, Phin's vendetta nearly destroys Harlem, prompting Miles to intervene. When Miles is nearly killed, Phin sees the error of her ways and sacrifices herself to save him.
