= Espers (comics) =

American comic book series

- The cover to Espers #1, art by Mick Austin.

Publication information
- Publisher: Eclipse Comics 1986–1987; Epic Comics 1989–1990; Halloween Comics 1996-1997; Image Comics 1997–1998
- Schedule: Monthly
- Format: Ongoing series
- Publication date: July 1986 – April 1998
- No. of issues: 5 (Vol. 1, Eclipse Comics); 8 (Epic Comics, as Interface); 6 (Vol. 2, Halloween Comics); 7 (Vol. 3, Image Comics)
- Main character(s): Linda Williams; Ian McVicar; William Silent Bear; Maria Rivas; Jiro Yabuki; Simon Ashley

Creative team
- Created by: James D. Hudnall
- Written by: James D. Hudnall
- Artist(s): David Lloyd; John M. Burns; Paul Johnson; Bill Koeb; Dan Brereton; Greg Horn; Gene Gonzales
- Editor(s): Cat Yronwoode 1986–1987

Espers (sometimes styled as ESPers) is a creator-owned American science fiction/superhero comic book series created and written by James D. Hudnall. It centers on a disparate group of people with various psychic powers who are brought together under duress and later coalesce as a team. The series was first published by Eclipse Comics in 1985, and most recently published by Image Comics in 1998.

== Creation ==
Writing in 1995, Hudnall noted the spy genre, Japanese anime films and the British TV series The Champions as influences on the series. He hoped Espers would bridge the gap between superhero comics aimed at younger readers and the growing adult-orientated comic market, and strove to write strong female characters for the series; Hudnall hoped to create "a Hill Street Blues of comic books". At the time he was working for Eclipse as marketing director, and Espers was his first published comics work. Hudnall also admired Alan Moore - especially Watchmen - and Frank Miller. He and initial artist David Lloyd undertook considerable research ahead of the series to ensure the needed level of accuracy and realism; Hudnall also eschewed codenames or costumes for the characters.

== Publishing history ==
=== Eclipse Comics ===
The first five issues in the series were published from 1986 to 1987 by Eclipse Comics. The first four issues were illustrated by David Lloyd, and the fifth by John Burns. The initial 4-issue story arc, later titled "Espers," introduced the main characters. Covers for the first four issues were provided by Mick Austin, John Bolton, Brian Bolland and Garry Leach. John M. Burns took over as artist for the second four issue arc of the series, titled "The Liquidators". However, only one issue - #5 - was published before the title was put on hiatus, a decision that Hudnall himself attributed to disappointing sales and to an unspecified dispute between Eclipse and himself.

=== Epic Comics ===
The series languished in limbo until 1989, when Hudnall struck a deal with Marvel's Epic Comics imprint, where eight issues were published under the title Interface from 1989 to 1991. The first six issues of that series, featuring painted art by Paul Johnson, re-introduced the main characters and re-told the first story arc in flashback form, before picking up the "Liquidators" storyline. The final two issues of the Epic series functioned as an epilogue to the arc.

=== Halloween Comics ===
The series then suffered its second extended publishing hiatus, this time for over five years before Hudnall himself revived the series in 1996, self-publishing another six issues under his own Halloween Comics imprint from 1996 to 1997. These issues were numbered as volume 2; 1–6, and comprised the "Undertow" story arc, featuring art by then-newcomer Greg Horn. Reflecting the real-life publishing schedule of the series, the events in these issues take place several years after those detailed in Interface.

=== Image Comics ===
The series was then moved to Image Comics, a decision which Hudnall explained in print at the time as one intended to make the series more broadly available than he could under his own imprint. Image published another seven issues of the series from 1997 to 1998, the first six of which again featured art by Horn. As of 2024 the series has not seen publication again.

== Plot ==
=== "The Storm" ===
Originally published in Espers Vol. 1 #1-4

People imbued with advanced psychic powers (known as 'espers') have been around for hundreds of years, but that their existence had been successfully kept from the general public by a secret conspiracy among a handful of powerful groups, including the Inner Circle, the Triad, and the Society of Esper Anarchists (known as the SEA). These diverse groups are all engaged in a generations-long war against each other in the shadows for power, control, and world domination. Five Espers from around the world are gathered by Linda Williams in an ultimately unsuccessful attempt to rescue her father from Beirut, where he is being held hostage by terrorists working for the Inner Circle. In the process they stumble upon a much bigger conspiracy.

=== "The Liquidators" ===
Originally published in Espers Vol. 1 #5 and Interface #1-8

Williams and her allies come under simultaneous (but separate) attack from super assassins hired by the Inner Circle and by the forces of mafia crime lord Benito Giovanetti (revealed to be the man behind the grassy Knoll). The Espers are aided by Alan Black, an assassin for the S.E.A. Afterwards the Espers encounter a Mind Dancer before they are aided by a mysterious 'Master' named Lori who teaches them more about their powers before disappearing herself.

=== "Undertow" ===
Originally published in Espers Vol. 2 #1-6

Several years later, the Espers come to the rescue of a 17-year-old high school girl from California named Skye Lanning. The petulant teenager possesses powerful psychometric powers, and as a result is being pursued by both the Triad and the Inner Circle. The Espers try to convince a reluctant Skye to join their team instead for her own protection. The struggle culminates in a final battle at an Inner Circle headquarters hidden in plain sight at Walt Disney World in Florida. It is revealed that all the world's Espers originated from a secret human breeding program masterminded by a shadowy group called the Architects, whose origins date back to the American Revolutionary War. The Architects have sought to alter humanity over hundreds of years through breeding and mysticism, and became The Inner Circle in 1880. In 1922 a group of Espers fled this selective breeding program; these were the forebears of the six 'renegade' Espers who make up the team.

=== "Black Magic" ===
Originally published in Espers Vol. 3 #1-4

The Espers come under attack by the occult branch of the Architects called The Pentacle while trying to stop the Architects' master plan to turn the United States Navy's High Frequency Active Aural Research Project (HAARP) - an array of antennae pumping high doses of energy into the ionosphere turning it into a transmitter blanketing the Earth - into the most powerful mind control device on the planet.

=== "Crossed Purposes" ===
Originally published in Espers Vol. 3 #5-7

Later the Espers go in search of Alan Black in Chicago, believing that they cannot battle the Architects without the help of the S.E. A; Alan and Simon then travel to an S.E.A. cell in Siberia, and Simon finds the 'Master' Lori. Meanwhile, Bill, Maria, and Ian head to Rio to try to liaise with the Triad, who dominate the city.

== Characters ==
=== The Espers ===
- Linda Williams: a wealthy American based in Monaco who is able to psychically hack computers and other devices operating on the electro-magnetic spectrum, a skill she uses to draw the names of the other Espers from a CIA databank.
- Ian McVicar: an English art smuggler, with the ability to shift into time at a different rate - effectively giving him super-speed. Due to his experience in tight situations he functions as the team's field commander.
- William Silent Bear: a mechanic from North Dakota with powerful telekinetic abilities, being able to levitate himself or anything else and even deflect bullets with his mind.
- Maria Rivas: a left-wing Argentine journalist, marked for death by the right-wing regime even before joining the Espers. She can project a forcefield around her that gives her teleportation powers.
- Jiro Yabuki: a Japanese student who can generate a wide variety of energies from his hands.
- Simon Ashley: a Jamaican chef who is a powerful pyrokinetic.
- Sky Lanning: an American high school student with psychometric abilities, giving her the ability to read the history of any object by touch. She joins the group after they save her life.

=== Allies ===
- Alan Black: an assassin for the SEA and a powerful psychic; while occasionally helpful to the Espers he is devoted to the S.E.A's centuries-long battle in the shadows against both the Inner Circle and the Triad.
- Brian Marx: a modern-day chaos magic-wielding magician on the run from the Architects.

=== Adversaries ===
- Sergei Koznishev: a murderous, high-ranking Inner Circle telekinetic.
- Tracy King: a former reporter who has become possessed by an evil ancestor named Aldo Roth, a rogue necromancer who died in 1787.

== Collected editions ==
Title	Publisher	ISBN	Release date	Issues
Espers	Caliber Comics		December 1994	Espers Vol. 1 #1-4
Espers: Black Magic	Image Comics	9781582400280	16 November 1998	Espers Vol. 3 #1-4
Espers: Undertow	Image Comics	9781887279932	24 November 1998	Espers Vol. 2 #1-6
Espers: The Storm	Caliber Comics	9780941613804	December 1998	Espers Vol. 1 #1-5
Espers: Interface	Image Comics	9781582400501	8 February 1999	Interface #1-6

Image planned a second collection of Volume 3, named Espers: Crossed Purposes, but it was never published. As of 2024 Interface #7-8 also remain uncollected.

== Reception ==
Reviewing the title for Amazing Heroes, Gerard Jones had mixed feelings - praising Hudnall's ambitions and ideas but noting that the minimalist style left the series wanting in characterisation.
