= Martian Manhunter: American Secrets =

1992 DC Comics miniseries

Publication information
- Publisher: DC Comics
- Schedule: Monthly
- Format: Limited series
- Genre: Superhero
- Publication date: August–October 1992
- No. of issues: 3
- Main character: Martian Manhunter

Creative team
- Written by: Gerard Jones
- Artist: Eduardo Barreto
- Letterer: Pat Brosseau
- Colorist: Steve Oliff

Martian Manhunter: American Secrets is a three-issue prestige format American comic book miniseries published in 1992 by DC Comics. Written by Gerard Jones and drawn by Eduardo Barreto, it stars Martian Manhunter, set in paranoid Cold War-era America. It takes place outside the mainstream DC Universe.

== Plot summary ==
In 1959 Denver police detective and closeted Martian John Jones is visiting New York City for a convention but gets wrapped up in investigating the mysterious murder of a painter. When entering the bar the man was last seen at, he hears talk of "the big question on TV", which John discovers is a wildly popular television quiz show called The Big Question. He visits the set of the program to investigate, hiding himself with his invisibility, and when the contestant, Miss Joy, requests a category different from the one she was directed to, her head explodes. The audience, including junior contestant Patty Marie, panics, but the director insists the explosion was merely special effects, and a doppelgänger Joy emerges from behind a curtain, stepping over the real Joy's body. This replica can see John despite his invisibility, and he flees the set. Jones then encounters musician Perkins Preston at a diner, who tells of a cult warning of "lizard-heads", and a crazed cartoonist, similarly preaching that Satan was a lizard. At the convention, John discusses his confusing trail of leads with a local cop named Jim Swift, who insists on visiting Jones's hotel room to discuss the case further. That night, Swift reveals himself as a "lizard-head" as he and his comrades break down John's door. John puts up a fight, but is forced to flee the scene when a fire, which Martians are averse to, starts in the room. John tries to interrogate music producer Phil Jerry, but Phil bursts into flames before he can divulge any information. John escapes with Perkins Preston and Patty Marie, who had both had frightening encounters with the lizards. The trio escapes the lizards and enter the town of Leavitzville.

== Reception ==
Martian Manhunter: American Secrets won the 1993 Eisner Award for Best Coloring.
