= Woody Wilson (writer) =

American comic strip writer

Woody Wilson is an American comic strip writer who crafted stories for Rex Morgan, M.D. and Judge Parker over many years. He retired from writing both strips in 2016.
