= Superman: Speeding Bullets =

1993 one-shot comic book

- Cover for Superman: Speeding Bullets

Publication information
- Publisher: DC Comics
- Format: Prestige format one-shot
- Publication date: January 1993
- No. of issues: 1
- Main character(s): Kal-El; Thomas Wayne; Martha Wayne; Lois Lane; Perry White; Lex Luthor

Creative team
- Created by: J. M. DeMatteis; Eduardo Barreto

Superman: Speeding Bullets is a DC Comics Elseworlds prestige format one-shot comic book published in 1993. It is written by J. M. DeMatteis and features the artwork of Eduardo Barreto. The comic book is based on the concept of an amalgamation of Superman and Batman.

== Plot ==
Baby Kal-El crashes onto Earth, where he is discovered by Thomas and Martha Wayne. Having always wanted a son, the couple adopt Kal-El and name him Bruce. One night, Thomas and Martha are gunned down by a mugger named Joe Chill in an alleyway. Bruce burns Chill's face with his heat vision (leading to Chill being found dead the next day) and discovers his superpowers, but he is too late to save his parents. Ashamed of his failure, he represses the knowledge of his powers.

Years later, an adult Bruce has become isolated and paranoid, hiding out in Wayne Manor. His super-hearing forces him to be aware of all crimes in Gotham City, and he obsessively collects newspaper clippings of violent crimes around the world. Armed robbers break into the Manor and take his butler, Alfred, hostage. Bruce, in a violent fury, remembers his powers and uses them to save Alfred, who takes him to a cave under the manor and shows Bruce the ship which brought him to Earth, revealing his alien origins. Meanwhile, the robbers return to their employer, who kills them for their failure. Bruce creates a costume for himself as the "Batman", and begins to brutally strike back at the criminals in Gotham.

Lex Luthor, a Metropolis-based industrialist who survived a life-threatening industrial accident the year before, moves his corporate headquarters to Gotham and organizes a buyout of Wayne Enterprises. To everyone's shock, Bruce arrives just as the contract is about to be signed and shuts down the deal, announcing that he will take personal control of the day-to-day running of his businesses moving forward. Bruce also purchases the Gotham Gazette and poaches Perry White and Lois Lane from the Daily Planet, which has become a soulless mouthpiece for Luthor. Lois gains a great respect for Bruce's passion and idealism as a publisher, and he, in turn, is smitten with her. Weeks later, Batman rescues Lois from a gang of assailants. Horrified at the vicious superpowered beating he delivers, she angrily rebuffs him when he tries to help her up.

Lois subsequently writes an editorial criticizing Batman's brutal conduct. Lex arrives to kidnap Lois and reveals that the accident he suffered bleached his skin chalk-white, turned his lips ruby-red, and drove him insane. He also reveals he has been using his vast fortune to attempt a total military takeover of Gotham with a huge army of heavily armed mercenaries and armored vehicles. Batman stops the takeover and captures Lex, who seems to care little about his failed coup and the loss of life it has caused. Bruce is eventually persuaded by Lois that Gotham needs the idealistic Bruce Wayne more than the violent Batman, and he decides to give up his costumed identity, assuming a new mantle: Superman.

== Characters ==
- Dr. Thomas Wayne: He and his wife, Martha, discover baby Kal-El's spaceship in a smoldering crater and they adopt the baby. He spends his time journaling his thoughts about his son's origin.
- Martha Wayne: She nurtures and coddles her son, Kal-El, thoroughly enjoying raising a child she has never had the chance to have herself.
- Alfred Pennyworth: The Waynes' butler and Bruce's trusted adviser and friend.
- Batman: The adopted son of the Wayne family, young Bruce would witness his adopted parents being killed in front of him, and would swear never to use his powers at all after killing the mugger with his heat vision in a moment of anger. The young Wayne heir would create the identity of the Batman as a means to fight against the criminals of Gotham City, until he would be convinced to forsake his dark persona by Lois Lane.
- Lex Luthor: A wealthy genius and owner of LexCorp. An exposure to deadly chemicals leaves him disfigured and drives him insane, but he is able to hide his twisted appearance with the use of a prosthetic mask while secretly financing a military takeover of Gotham. His plans are foiled by Bruce as Batman, but Luthor, having fully embraced his madness, no longer cares about the consequences of his actions.

== Awards ==
Superman: Speeding Bullets won the Comics Buyer's Guide Fan Award for Favorite Original Graphic Novel or Album for 1993.

== Publication ==
The comic was released as a 52-page prestige format one-shot comic book (ISBN 1563891174).

== See also ==
- Alternative versions of Superman
- List of Elseworlds publications
