= Agent (Marvel Comics) =

Fictional character in Marvel Comics

The Agent
- The Agent.

Publication information
- Publisher: Marvel Comics
- First appearance: Marvel Graphic Novel: Rick Mason, The Agent (1989)
- Created by: James Hudnall; John Ridgway

In-story information
- Alter ego: Rick Mason
- Species: Human
- Team affiliations: S.H.I.E.L.D.
- Notable aliases: Daniel Shook
- Abilities: Skilled martial artist; Weapon proficiency

The Agent (Rick Mason) is a fictional character appearing in American comic books published by Marvel Comics. He is a freelance mercenary specializing in dealing with superhuman threats, and the son of Phineas Mason / Tinkerer. Created by James Hudnall and John Ridgway, the character first appeared in Marvel Graphic Novel: Rick Mason, The Agent #1 (December 1989).

O-T Fagbenle portrayed Rick Mason in the Marvel Cinematic Universe film Black Widow (2021) and the Disney+ miniseries Secret Invasion (2023).

== Publication history ==
Rick Mason was created by James Hudnall and John Ridgway and made his debut in Marvel Graphic Novel: Rick Mason, The Agent #1 (December 1989).

== Fictional character biography ==
Rick Mason served as a mercenary with a specialization in the non-lethal handling of superhumans, having grown up exposed to advanced technology necessary for such tasks as the son of the criminal inventor Phineas Mason, better known as the Tinkerer.

Mason became a highly trained covert operative due to the experience he gained working alongside individuals like Nick Fury, Dennis Nayland, and Alexi Vazhin. He decided to become freelance, adopting the codename "The Agent," and has completed missions for the governments of many nations, including the United States, Israel, Japan, and the United Kingdom.

Mason was once hired to kill an alleged mole code-named "Vitamin" from the Central Intelligence Agency in Berlin. In an attempt to kill him, Mason blew up a hotel, but he was under observation by Michael Rossi and Carol Danvers, who tracked him across the city. Mason escaped using one of his father's devices to become invisible.

His upbringing in New York City brought him into contact with many criminals due to his father's occupation. Ill at ease with wrong-doers, the Agent sought a path in life other than aiding others in perpetrating crimes. Becoming a mercenary, he worked for S.H.I.E.L.D. but was later hired by the British government to prevent the super team China Force from overthrowing their rule of Hong Kong. Returning to S.H.I.E.L.D., he was required by Nick Fury to undertake a similar mission in Costa Brava involving American-backed rebels. The Agent discovered that one of his former teachers, Teng Yun-Suan, was responsible for both of these incidents. Yun-Suan met death at the Agent's hands. As a freelance mercenary with a specialization in non-lethal superhuman handlings, he assisted Nick Fury involving superhuman mercenaries.

The Agent remained on good terms with his father despite the latter making a living in a field he did not approve of. The Corporation used this to their advantage and kidnapped the Agent to force the Tinkerer to work for them. Mason encountered Luke Cage and Dakota North, and the three defeated the Corporation. However, Mason was apparently killed later on, after which his activities as the anonymous Agent became public knowledge.

Mason's own son was killed in an explosion caused by Nitro in Stamford, Connecticut, which heralded the Civil War's beginning.

Mason later worked with Carol Danvers, and the two learned about Ghazi Rashid, who now possessed superhuman abilities. After it is revealed that Rossi was Vitamin, and after Ms. Marvel is overloaded with power, Mason almost dies from a bomb, barely making it out in time. He tracks down and kills Rossi in Brazil before speaking with Norman Osborn about his father's release from prison, threatening death in retaliation for Ms. Marvel's apparent demise.

== Powers and abilities ==
Rick Mason is an expert at armed combat and hand-to-hand combat.

== In other media ==
=== Marvel Cinematic Universe ===
Rick Mason appears in media set in the Marvel Cinematic Universe (MCU), portrayed by O-T Fagbenle.

- First appearing in Black Widow, this version is an ally from Natasha Romanoff's past with S.H.I.E.L.D. and a romantic interest. Fagbenle described Mason as "a finder for people who aren't so affiliated with armies".
- Mason appears in the Secret Invasion episode "Harvest", in which he assists Nick Fury.

=== Video games ===
Rick Mason appears in Marvel's Spider-Man: Miles Morales, voiced by Todd Williams. This version was a Roxxon scientist, the older brother of Phin Mason, and a friend of Miles Morales. While working for Roxxon, Rick helped create the Nuform power source until he and his staff were diagnosed with bone marrow failure. With Phin's help, Rick tried to expose the truth but was trapped and killed by Roxxon's R&D director Simon Krieger, who subsequently took credit for Rick's work. Rick's death pushed his sister to seek revenge as the Tinkerer, resulting in a violent conflict between the Underground criminal group and Roxxon that Miles works to contain.
