= Aliens/Predator: Deadliest of the Species =

1993–1995 comic book series

Cover of the collector's edition.

Aliens/Predator: Deadliest of the Species is a 12 issue comic book limited series published by Dark Horse Comics from 1993 to 1995.

It was written by Chris Claremont, with art in the first three issues by Jackson Guice (pencils) and John Beatty (inks), Eduardo Barreto took over art duties in issue #4. According to Claremont, "The in-house description is 'Thelma and Louise with serious attitude and really big guns.'" It is among the longer stories told for the Aliens vs Predator series, being twelve issues compared to the average four issue storyline of its predecessors and the covers half of the second AVP Omnibus.

== Plot ==
The Story takes place in the futuristic Alien vs. Predator universe, where Earth has been overrun by Aliens, and the social elite have taken refuge in gigantic skyliners. Caryn Delacroix is the protagonist, with an unclear past regarding both the Aliens and Predators throughout most of the comic. An artificial intelligence serves as the primary antagonist, while the Xenomorphs and the Predator are many times in cooperation with Delacroix and her companions for parts of the series, in particular a Predator called "Big Mama".

== Crossovers ==
Apart from the Aliens/Predator universe crossover, Claremont also made references to his previous short comic Renegade.

- Several notable comic book characters also make cameos as Predator trophies. These are Magneto, Wolverine, Batman, and Cyclops.

== Production ==
Claremont remarked that the editor of the series gave him far more creative freedom than he was accustomed to: "So long as I don't violate the basic parameters of the Alien/Predator universe - there's a limit to what we can establish about them, and I'm stretching that by establishing a female Predator - I can do pretty much what I want. I can write the kind of characters I want, and that's a freedom I haven't had in a long time, especially as regarding the X-Men."

== Publication ==
The comics were collected as two trade paperback and then later released as a single volume:

- Aliens/Predator: Deadliest of the Species (by Chris Claremont, with pencils Jackson Guice and inks by John Beatty (1-3) and full art by Eduardo Barreto (4-12), Dark Horse Comics, 320 pages, paperback, 1996, ISBN 1-56971-184-4, Titan Books, 1998, ISBN 1-85286-953-4, hardcover, 1997, ISBN 1-56971-182-8) collects:
  - Deadliest of the Species Book 1 (tpb, collects Deadliest of the Species #1-6, 152 pages, 1995, Boxtree, ISBN 0-7522-0878-0, Warner Books, ISBN 1-56971-184-4)
  - Deadliest of the Species Book 2 (tpb, collects Deadliest of the Species #7-12, 156 pages, 1995, Boxtree, ISBN 0-7522-0695-8)

It is also collected in:

- Aliens vs. Predator Omnibus Volume 2 (collects Deadliest of the Species plus some shorter stories, 448 pages, October 2007, ISBN 1-59307-829-3)

== Reception ==
Steve Watson reviewed Aliens: The Deadliest of Species: Predator for Arcane magazine, rating it a 9 out of 10 overall. Watson comments that "Barreto displays a thorough knowledge of the female anatomy in illustrating - very tastefully, I may add - a story which ultimately deals with maternal instinct and female intuition in a fascinating way. Written in a style which provides plenty of space for intrigue and surprise, this novel is a marvellous example of the form."

== See also ==
- Aliens versus Predator
