= Mike Manley (artist) =

American comic artist (born 1961)

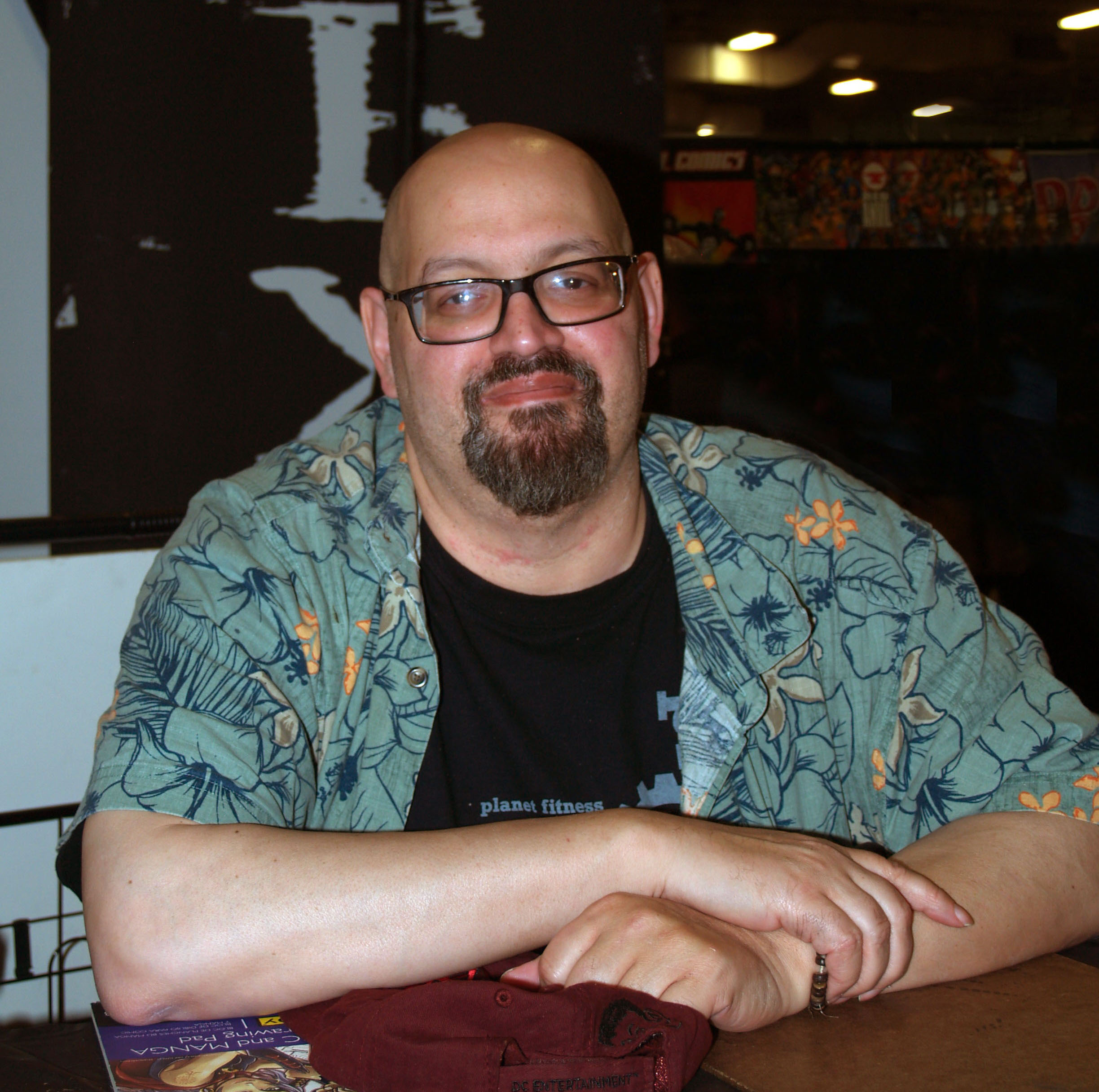
- Manley in April 2016
- Born: Michael Manley; October 19, 1961 (age 65) Detroit, Michigan, U.S.
- Areas: Penciller, Inker
- Notable works: Darkhawk, The Phantom and Judge Parker

Michael Manley (born October 19, 1961) is an American artist, most notable as a comic strip cartoonist and comic book inker and penciller. Manley currently draws two syndicated comic strips, Judge Parker and The Phantom. He is also known for co-creating the Marvel Comics character Darkhawk.

== Personal life ==
Manley was born in Detroit, Michigan.

Manley's grandfather was a commercial artist, and Manley was therefore aware as a child that one could make a living at drawing. He became a comic book collector and reader, and the time he was a teenager had decided to become a comic book artist, an animator or an illustrator.

A commercial art class in high school in Ann Arbor enabled Manley to assemble a portfolio, which led to his start in commercial printing at age fifteen. He attended Washtenaw Community College, but found the art education he was receiving there to be unsatisfying. At age twenty-one, Manley began working for the Detroit Metro Times as art director. Two years after, he had his first comic book art assignment at DC Comics.

He cites other artists in addition to Frazetta as inspiration: Alex Raymond, Stan Drake, Leonard Starr, John Prentice, and Al Williamson. In his late twenties, Manley would have the opportunity to work for a brief but intensely formative time alongside Williamson, in that artist's Honesdale, Pennsylvania studio.

Manley lives in Upper Darby Township, Pennsylvania just outside Philadelphia.

== Career ==
=== Comic book artist ===
Mike Manley has worked as an artist for major publishers such as Marvel Comics, DC Comics, and Dark Horse Comics. Manley, with writers Danny Fingeroth and Tom DeFalco, co-created in 1991 the Darkhawk series, which he drew for the first half of its run. He has also contributed to other comic book titles such as Batman, Quasar, Captain America, Marvel Universe, and The Power of Shazam!. His comics work includes a number of short runs and fill-in issues on a wide variety of titles.

In his run on the Batman series, Manley was one of the artists of Batman #500 in which the character Azrael replaced Bruce Wayne as Batman. He drew the series during the "KnightsEnd" storyline and the Zero Hour: Crisis in Time crossover.

In 1995, Manley formed Action Planet Inc. as a home to publish his own comics and ideas, starting with the anthology Action Planet Comics, featuring his character Monsterman. In early 1996 he founded ActionPlanet.com, which has grown to include his award-winning online web comic, G.I.R.L. Patrol.

In 2007, while primarily working as an art teacher, Manley illustrated a new Secret Agent Corrigan story for the Swedish publisher Egmont Publishing.

=== Book illustrator ===
Concurrently with some of his time at Marvel Comics, between 1985 and 1990, Manley illustrated children's books utilizing licensed characters. For Macmillan Publishing, he illustrated books in their Raggedy Ann and Andy series. For Golden Books and Western Publishing he worked on several children's fun and activity books, with Barbie, He-Man, Captain Power, Tiny Toons, Ghost Busters and the Muppets as some of the characters featured.

In 1989 Manley worked for West End Games on role-playing game books in the Star Wars line.

=== Animation artist ===
In 1996 Manley moved into the animation field, first working as a storyboard artist on Superman: The Animated Series for Kids' WB. The first of the seven episodes that included his work featured Lobo, and was titled "The Main Man, Part 2". Manley also worked on the storyboards team for three episodes of The New Batman Adventures between 1997 and 1998.

Throughout the 2000s, Manley created storyboards as a freelance artist on TV cartoons such as: Samurai Jack (on which series he also received two writing credits); Kim Possible; The Fairly OddParents; The Venture Brothers; Growing Up Creepie; and The Secret Saturdays. Other projects in this period included: Spy Groove for MTV; Todd McFarlane's Spawn for HBO; ABC's One Saturday Morning; Clerks: The Animated Series, based on the Kevin Smith movie; and Justice League: The New Frontier.

Between 1998 and 2001, Manley was a background key designer for Superman: The Animated Series (nine episodes, following his time as a storyboard artist on that series), and background key designer then background designer on Batman Beyond (thirty-three episodes overall).

He is also credited as character designer on eight episodes of Batman: The Brave and the Bold between 2008 and 2009.

=== Art teacher ===
While working in both comics and animation, Manley created and edited Draw! Magazine, a twice Eisner-nominated "how-to" magazine published by TwoMorrows Publishing. The magazine features step-by-step demos and articles on artists working in comics, cartooning, and animation. Manley also co-produced a how-to DVD along with Danny Fingeroth, How to Create Comics from Script to Print, also distributed by TwoMorrows.

In 2000, Manley started a new career as an art teacher. He taught in the animation department at the Delaware College of Art and Design (DCAD) until 2009 and became a senior lecturer at the University of the Arts in Philadelphia. Manley then enrolled at the Pennsylvania Academy of the Fine Arts, finishing his certificate in painting on his way toward completing his master's degree.

=== Comic strip artist ===
Manley was hired to draw the serial newspaper comic strip Judge Parker for four weeks beginning March 15, 2010, filling in for regular artist Eduardo Barreto during an illness. The syndicate essentially held a "two-man tryout" for Barreto's replacement, with Manley's audition following John Heebink's; Manley was offered the full-time job after he turned in his second week of art for the strip. Manley and Heebink had known each other since high school. Manley draws the strip for all seven days of the week.

In late March 2016, it was announced that Manley would succeed Paul Ryan, who had died unexpectedly, as artist on The Phantom daily strips (the Sundays would continue to be drawn by the incumbent, Terry Beatty). Manley's tenure began with the strip dated May 30, 2016. Manley noted that he and Paul Ryan are numbered among a small and notable group of artists who have professionally drawn the adventures of both Batman and The Phantom. The others have been Jim Aparo, Terry Beatty, Don Newton, Carmine Infantino (as a ghost for Sy Barry), Joe Giella (ghosting for Bob Kane) and Graham Nolan.

The choice of Manley to take on the Phantom received an endorsement from Comic Strip of the Day.com: "He's one of the few who has found a way to maintain some detail in an ever-shrinking print medium that has driven most artists to a simplified style that works better in shrinky-dink mode than when the comics are read on line, at least on a real computer with a real monitor."

== Bibliography ==
=== Dark Horse Comics ===
- Aliens Vs. Predator: War #1 (1995)

=== DC Comics ===
- Adventures in the DC Universe Annual #1 (1997)
- Adventures of Superman #519 (inks over Barry Kitson) (1995)
- Aquaman: Sword of Atlantis #49 (2007)
- Batman #501–506, 508–511, #0, (full art); #500 (inks over Jim Aparo); Annual #19 (inks over Bret Blevins) (1993–1995)
- Batman: Brotherhood of the Bat #1 (1995)
- Batman: Legends of the Dark Knight Annual #3 (1993)
- Batman: Shadow of the Bat #16 (inks over Bret Blevins) (1993)
- Birds of Prey #66 (inks over Michael Golden) (2004)
- Cartoon Network Action Pack #29 (full art); #30, 40 (inks over Scott Jeralds); #32, 34, 36, 39–40 (inks over Will Sweeney) (2008–2009)
- Catwoman vol. 3 #14 (inks over Cameron Stewart) (2003)
- Catwoman Secret Files and Origins #1 (inks over Michael Avon Oeming) (2002)
- Convergence Justice League International #1–2 (2015)
- Dexter's Laboratory #7, 12, 24, 33 (2000–2003)
- Green Arrow vol. 2 #46 (inks over Denys Cowan) (1991)
- Guardians of Metropolis #1–4 (inks over Kieron Dwyer) (1994–1995)
- Hardware #4, 6–7 (inks over Denys Cowan) (1993)
- Harley Quinn Road Trip Special #1 (inks) (2015)
- Jaguar #7 (inks over Chuck Wojtkiewicz) (1992)
- Power of Shazam #18, 37, Annual #1 (full art);1–13, 15–17, 20–27 (inks over Peter Krause); #8, 11, 17 (inks over Curt Swan); #14, 19 (inks over Gil Kane); #19 (inks over Joe Staton) (1995–1998)
- Powerpuff Girls #7 (2000)
- The Question Quarterly #4–5 (inks over Denys Cowan) (1991–1992)
- Robotech Defenders #2 (1985)
- Samurai Jack Special #1 (inks over Lynn Naylor) (2002)
- Star Trek: The Next Generation #18 (1991)
- Superboy vol. 3 #68 (inks over Tom Grummett) (1999)
- Supergirl Plus #1 (1997)
- Superman #660 (2007)
- Superman vol. 2 #95 (inks over Dan Jurgens) (1994)
- Superman Adventures #9, 25, 28, 34, 41 (full art); Special #1 (inks over John Delaney) (1997–2000)
- Young Heroes in Love #4 (1997)

=== Egmont ===
- Agent X9 #9/2007, 9/2009

=== First Comics ===
- Jon Sable, Freelance #44, 46–49 (1987)

=== Image Comics ===
- Action Planet Comics #3 (1997)
- Deathmate Yellow #1 (inks over Don Perlin) (1993)

=== Marvel Comics ===
- Alpha Flight #71, 73–76, 78–82, 84–85 (inks over John Calimee); #77 (inks over Huw Thomas); #86 (inks over Mark Bagley); #87–91, 93–95 (inks over Michael Bair); #96 (inks over Michael Adams) (1989–1991)
- Black Panther vol. 4 #9–10 (1999)
- Captain America #Annual 10 (full art); #447 (inks over Ron Garney) (1991–1996)
- Clive Barker's Night Breed #8 (full art); #7 (inks over Bret Blevins) (1991)
- Daredevil #264 (inks over Steve Ditko) (1989)
- Darkhawk #1–25, Annual #1 (1991–1993)
- Deathlok vol. 2 #14, Annual #1 (full art); #1–7, 9–13, 15 (inks over Denys Cowan) (1991–1992)
- The Destroyer #2 (1989)
- Doctor Strange Sorcerer Supreme Annual #4 (inks over Anna-Maria Cool) (1994)
- Friendly Neighborhood Spider-Man #9–10 (inks over Mike Wieringo) (2006)
- Ghost Rider vol. 3 #38 (1993)
- Ghost Rider/Blaze: Spirits of Vengeance #14–15 (1993)
- Marvel Double-Shot #3 (inks over Darwyn Cooke) (2003)
- Marvel Holiday Special #4 (1994)
- Marvel Universe #4 (full art); #5 (inks over Bret Blevins); #6–7 (inks over Jason Armstrong) (1998)
- Moon Knight: Divided We Fall #1 (inks over Denys Cowan) (1992)
- New Mutants #73 (inks over Bret Blevins) (1989)
- Powerline #8 (1989)
- Power Pack #52 (full art); #50 (inks over Tod Smith) (1989)
- The Punisher War Zone #7–8 (inks over John Romita Jr.); #9–11 (inks over Mike Harris) (1992–1993)
- Quasar #7–17 (1990)
- A Shadowline Saga: Critical Mass #2, 4–5, 7 (1990)
- Sleepwalker #8–10, 13–14, 17 (inks over Bret Blevins) (1992)
- The Spectacular Spider-Man Annual #10 (1990)
- Spider-Man #55 (1995)
- Spider-Man Holiday Special '95 #1 (1996)
- The Transformers #9 (1985)
- Ultimate Civil War: Spider-Ham #1 (inks over Mike Wieringo) (2007)
- Weaveworld #1–3 (1991–1992)
- Web of Spider-Man #66 (inks over Alex Saviuk) (1990)
- West Coast Avengers Annual #4 (1989)

=== Valiant Comics ===
- Destroyer #0 (1995)
- Ninjak #18–21 (1995)
- Solar, Man of the Atom #57–58 (1996)
- Timewalker #0 (inks over Don Perlin) (1996)
- X-O Manowar #4 (1992)

Preceded by Hilary Barta	Alpha Flight inker 1989–1991	Succeeded by Chris Ivy
Preceded by Paul Ryan	Quasar penciller 1990	Succeeded by Greg Capullo
Preceded by n/a	Darkhawk penciller 1991–1993	Succeeded by Tod Smith
Preceded by n/a	Deathlok inker 1991–1992	Succeeded by Jimmy Palmiotti
Preceded by Jim Aparo	Batman penciller 1993–1994	Succeeded by Mike Gustovich
Preceded by n/a	Power of Shazam inker 1995–1997	Succeeded by Dick Giordano
