= Helen Velando =

Uruguayan writer

Helen Velando (born 3 December 1961) in Montevideo is a Uruguayan writer of books for children and young people. Velando books of adventures have become a referent of Uruguayan literature an infantile contemporary.

== Early life and career ==
Velando studied three years of law school but she left when she determined that art was the motor that moved her soul. She began to sing and to study theatre and puppets, and got to have a blues band. She had many jobs: she sold books, shoes and clothes, made surveys, wove, was a theater educator and scriptwriter for comedy television. In 1989 she began to write adaptations for theater. In 1993, the year in which she gained a Florencio Sánchez Prize as the best new actress, she published her first book. Her great step was in 1999 when, after four years without publishing anything, her book Detectives en el Parque Rodó was a great success in Uruguay.

== Works ==
- Las increíbles historias de Superma-pupu, una pulga diferente (1993)
- Una pulga interplanataria (1995)
- Cuentos de otras lunas (1996)
- Detectives en el Parque Rodó (1999)
- Misterio en el Cabo Polonio (2001)
- Detectives en el Cementerio Central (2002)
- Fantasmas en la Sierra de las Ánimas (2002)
- Los cazaventuras 1, 2 y 3 (2003, 2004, 2005)
- Memorias de una gripe (2005)
- Piratas del Santa Lucia (2005)
- Cazaventura y el Tesoro de las Guayanas (2006)
