= James D. Hudnall =

American writer (1957–2019)

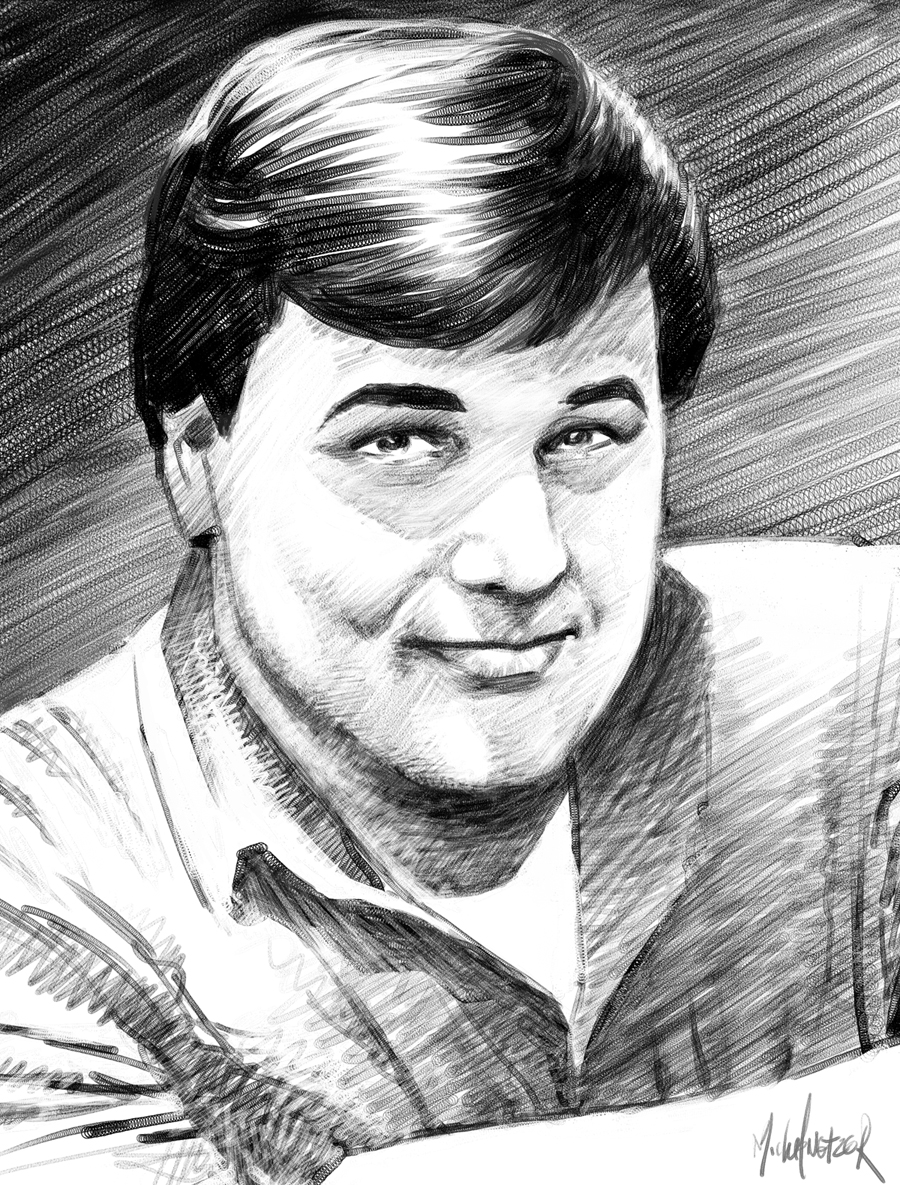
- James Hudnall by Michael Netzer
- Born: James David Hudnall; April 10, 1957 Santa Rosa, California, US
- Died: April 9, 2019 (aged 61)
- Areas: Writer, Letterer
- Pseudonym: Hud
- Notable works: Espers; Alpha Flight; Strikeforce: Morituri; Interface

James David Hudnall (April 10, 1957 – April 9, 2019) was an American writer who began his career in the comic book field in 1986 with the series Espers, published by Eclipse Comics. He later worked for Marvel and DC on such titles as Alpha Flight, Strikeforce: Morituri, and his own creation Interface, which was a sequel to Espers. He also wrote graphic novels such as Lex Luthor: The Unauthorized Biography, Sinking, Streets and The Psycho.

His series Harsh Realm was adapted to television by X-Files producer Chris Carter in 1998. Hudnall and co-creator Andrew Paquette sued Carter and Fox Television when they failed to give them credits on the show. The suit was later settled and as part of the settlement Hudnall and Paquette received credit in the opening titles of the show,

Hudnall's other works includes: The Age of Heroes, Aftermath, Shut Up And Die, Two to the Chest, Chiller, Devastator, Hardcase and The Solution. He wrote a libertarian leaning blog under the Pajamas Media group, a network of political blogs.

== Early life ==
Hudnall's parents divorced when he was two and his mother remarried to a man in the US Navy. The family settled in San Diego, California in the 1970s, and after graduating from Point Loma High School, Hudnall joined the U.S. Air Force in 1976. He was stationed in England.

After his discharge from the Air Force, Hudnall went to Coleman College in San Diego where he majored in computer science. He worked as a computer software consultant in Orange County, California, Sonoma County, and briefly in England. On returning to the states, he settled in Orange County, Ca where he began to read comics again. This renewed his interest in the medium and got him interested in writing, which was an earlier ambition. Hudnall attempted to self-publish a comic in 1982.

== Comics career ==
In 1985, he started working with Eclipse Comics as a marketing director. In 1986 his first comic was published - Espers. From there, he went on to work for Marvel Comics, DC Comics, Image, Dark Horse and Malibu.

Hudnall switched from writing comics to internet development in the late 1990s, while producing more limited work over the years, such as Trigs for Humanoids and 2 To the Chest from his own company Dark Planet Productions.

In 2009, he began writing for the Andrew Breitbart blog Big Hollywood.

Hudnall later went into digital comics in 2012 when David Lloyd created the online comics anthology Aces Weekly with Val Mayerik.

In the fall of 2013, Hudnall released his first novel, The Age of Heroes: Hell's Reward, which is part of a planned series. A second series of novels, the Secret Team, is slated to debut in 2015.

== Bibliography ==
Comics work includes:

=== DC Comics ===
- Action Comics #666 (1991)
- Adventures of Superman #479 (1991)
- Batman: Legends of the Dark Knight #31 (1992)
- Lex Luthor: The Unauthorized Biography (1989)
- The Psycho #1–3 (1991)
- Streets #1–3 (1993–1994)
- Superman #56 (1991)

=== Eclipse Comics ===
- Espers #1–5 (1986–1987)

=== Harris Comics ===
- Harsh Realm #1–5 (1994)

=== Image Comics ===
- The Age of Heroes #1–5, Special #1–2, Wex (1997–1999)
- Devestator #1–2 (1998)
- Espers #1–7 (1997–1998)

=== Malibu Comics ===
- Freex #7, 15 (1994–1995)
- Godwheel #1 (1995)
- Hardcase #1–26 (1993–1995)
- Hardcase Premiere Edition #0 (1993)
- Metallica (1993)
- Sludge #12 (1994)
- Solution #0, 1–17 (1993–1995)
- Strangers #4, 8 (1993–1994)
- Ultraverse Premiere #0 (1993)
- Ultraverse Zero:The Death of the Squad #1–4 (1995)

=== Marvel Comics ===
- Alpha Flight #63, 67–86 (1988–1990)
- Chiller #1–2 (1993)
- Interface #1–8 (1989–1990)
- Rick Mason, The Agent (1989)
- Sinking (1992)
- Strikeforce: Morituri #21–31 (1988–1989)
- Strikeforce: Morituri: Electric Undertow #1–5 (1989–1990)

=== Others ===
- Shut Up and Die
- Trigs
- 2 to the Chest
- Blue Cat
- Devil's End FCBD 2019 (Lucky Comics, 2019)
- Devil's End #1 (Lucky Comics, 2021)

=== Novels ===
- The Age of Heroes: Hell's Reward

== Health ==
Hudnall had diabetes, which in 2015 led to the amputation of his right leg. He died April 9, 2019, one day prior to his 62nd birthday.

== Awards and recognition ==
His graphic novel, Sinking, which is the fictional autobiography of a schizophrenic, earned him an Eisner Award nomination. The Brazilian translation of Lex Luthor: The Unauthorized Biography, published by Editora Abril in 1990, won the Brazilian award Troféu HQ Mix for best special edition.

In 2017 Hudnall received the Inkpot Award for his career in comics at San Diego Comic-Con.

== Notes ==
Preceded by Bill Mantlo	Alpha Flight writer 1988–1990	Succeeded by Fabian Nicieza
