= Harold LeDoux =

American cartoonist

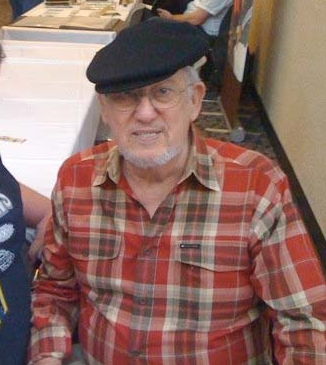
- Harold LeDoux at the Dallas Comic Con in Richardson, Texas (January 30, 2010)
- Born: November 7, 1926 Port Arthur, Texas
- Died: June 7, 2015 (aged 88) Dallas, Texas
- Area: Artist
- Notable works: Judge Parker

Harold Anthony LeDoux (November 7, 1926 – June 7, 2015) was an American artist best known for his work on the newspaper comic strip Judge Parker. He worked in the realistic style associated with Stan Drake, Leonard Starr, et al.

While in the Merchant Marine during World War II, LeDoux saved enough money to be able to attend the Chicago Academy of Fine Arts. Arriving in New York City, he began contributing to the Famous Funnies comic books.

== Judge Parker ==
He then worked as assistant to artist Dan Heilman on the successful Judge Parker strip just as or shortly after the strip debuted in 1952. Ledoux claimed that "by the last week of September 1953, I had the job of drawing Judge Parker for myself." It may be that he was ghosting for or was supervised by Heilman in a studio arrangement, both common circumstances in comic strip history. In any case, it was not until 1965 that LeDoux was credited as artist on the strip, as Heilman relinquished the title to pursue another project (he died shortly after).

LeDoux officially held the position for over four decades, with his last strip running on May 28, 2006. Comic book artist Eduardo Barreto replaced him.

Harold LeDoux's Judge Parker (1965)

LeDoux retired in 2006, living in Richardson, Texas. He died in Dallas on June 7, 2015.
