= Indiana Jones and the Spear of Destiny =

Comic book mini-series

- Issue #1 cover by Hugh Fleming.

Publication information
- Publisher: Dark Horse Comics
- Schedule: Monthly
- Format: Mini-series
- Genre: Action/adventure
- Publication date: April - July 1995
- No. of issues: 4

Creative team
- Created by: George Lucas
- Written by: Elaine Lee
- Penciller(s): Will Simpson (#1); Dan Spiegle (#2-4)
- Inker: Dan Spiegle (#1-4)
- Letterer(s): Clem Robins (#1); Carrie Spiegle (#2-4)
- Colorist: Elaine Lee
- Editor(s): Bob Cooper/Dan Thorsland (#1); Marilee Hord (#2-4)

Indiana Jones and the Spear of Destiny is a four-issue comic book mini-series published by Dark Horse Comics from April to July 1995. It was their seventh series about the adult Indiana Jones.

== Plot summary ==
=== Canyon of the Crescent Moon, 1938 ===
Indiana Jones reached for the Holy Grail, perched in a crack in the Temple of the Sun. Hanging onto him, his father, Professor Henry Jones urged him to let it go, and Indy turned back and let his father help him up. As the Joneses ride out into the Canyon of the Crescent Moon with Marcus Brody and Sallah, they mused on what they found in the Grail. Privately, Indy admitted to himself that he lost the Grail, while his father admitted to himself that he should have stayed to become the Grail's guardian, but was too weak.

=== Near Newgrange, Ireland, 1945 ===
Indiana Jones supervised the uncovering of several rock carvings inside a mound near Newgrange, in Ireland. One of his assistants, Brendan O'Neal, helped himself to small stone spiral carving. As the team quit for the day, a mysterious blond woman appeared, with food and a letter for Jones. O'Neal warned that she might be a fairy before he left, but Jones took the letter, sent from his father. The woman shone a mirror into the mound, which caused the interior to light up, sending Jones to tumble down inside the cave.

Jones had a vision of a verdant paradise, where a cloaked man claimed that the spear was his. Wrestling with the man, Jones saw that it was Adolf Hitler. Trying to escape, Jones found a tree, half blooming, and half burning. The mysterious woman explained the nature of the spear and ordered Jones to find it. Waking from his hallucination, Jones found himself in the common room of Connely's Inn, where the innkeeper and his wife tended to the injured archaeologist, and had not seen the woman that Jones had met. The barkeep explained that Jones had been found outside the mound, and carried back by the men. Jones discovered that he still had the letter in his jacket, and read it. Henry wrote that while lecturing at the annual Grail lore conference in Glastonbury, he had been approached by some "Nederlanders" who were very interested in the Spear of Longinus, rumored to be connected to Glastonbury by the legends of Joseph of Arimathea. Hoping to prevent the Nazis from finding it, Henry was enlisting the help of his son. Wiped out, Indy went upstairs to his room to sleep.

In the middle of the night, Jones woke up in pain and started downstairs for a drink. He overheard Connely discussing Jones and his letter to a Nazi via radio. Connely offered to have his Blueshirts kill Jones, and Jones slipped back upstairs to make his escape. Back in his room, he began packing his gear, when a shadowy figure grabbed him. Jones fought back against his assailant before Jones realized that it was O'Neal, who had arrived to warn Jones of the plot to kill him. When Pete and two other Blueshirts came up to attack Jones, Jones surprised them by smashing a framed picture of Jesus Christ into Pete's face, and then climbed out the window with O'Neal. O'Neal drove Jones away in his mom's car, which had been converted to using natural gas, and had a large gas-filled bladder on top. They drove off, chased in two cars by Pete, Bobby, and their leader. Miles later, the pursuers gained on Jones and O'Neal, who jumped from the car just before a bullet exploded the gas tank, destroying the vehicle. Jones and O'Neal commandeered a horse cart and managed to get to the coastal town with the ferry port. Throwing off some cargo to cause their pursuers to crash before the dock, Jones forced his attackers to leave their cars and chase on foot. As they raced for the ferry, Pete shot O'Neal. Jones grabbed O'Neal, and jumped onto the departing ferry, safe from pursuit. Aboard the ferry, O'Neal revealed that he had not been injured, as the bullet had hit and destroyed the spiral stone carving in his pocket instead.

=== Glastonbury, England ===
The next day, Jones and O'Neal met up with Professor Jones, who filled them in on the history of the Spear as they climbed up Wearyall Hill. At the site of the Holy Thorn, Henry was prevented from grasping a sprig by Edwina Cheltingham, who, though first serious at stopping botanical vandalism, introduced herself. As Henry explained that the spear tip was to be found in the Weltliche Schatzkammer of Vienna, Cheltingham got involved and pointed out that some speculated that the Staff of Joseph which grew into the thorn may have also been the shaft of the Spear. Indy realized that the Nazis needed the wood from the thorn tree to rebuild the Spear, and the four plotted to question the young would-be mystic from the Nazi group Seigfried. Henry sent a letter to Seigfried, inviting him to meet alone.

That sundown, Seigfried arrived at the Chalice Well alone, with the note. Since Henry had not arrived, the youth drank from the well, and received a vision about the nature of the Spear, with Seigfried as a knight. Overhearing Seig talking about having his blood purified by the Spear, Henry Jones arrived and remarked on some of the sins of Germany during this time - and alluded to more blood spilled if Hitler had the spear. Sensing a trap, Seigfried tried to escape, but O'Neal and Indiana Jones wrestled to hold him for questioning. Finally, Henry was convinced that Seig did not know where the spear tip was. Seig's father, Dieterhoffmann arrived with his brutes, and captured the Joneses and O'Neal. Kurt and Jorge tied up Indy and O'Neal, while Dieterhoffmann explained that with the Spear assembled, his son, who had been intentionally kept pure, could wield the Spear to restore German domination, which Hitler, an Austrian, had failed to do. Dieterhoffmann also surprised his son, by revealing that he had gotten the spear tip, with the help of Otto Nehrkorn. Plotting to kill the interlopers, Dieterhoffmann was forced to stop when a tour group of schoolgirls arrived, led on a night-time garden tour by Cheltingham. She whispered a rendezvous point to Indiana, and then tried to force the Nazis to leave the garden for trespassing. Jones used the distraction to escape, and Nehrkorn chased him, but eschewing Dieterhoffmann's violence, let him go instead. Jones returned to the scene to tackle Dieterhoffmann, whose pistol went off, breaking the spear tip into two halves - one of which fell to Seigfried, the other landed in O'Neal's hands. Unwilling to shoot their captives with so many schoolgirl witnesses about, the Nazis were unable to prevent the Joneses and O'Neal from escaping.

Later that night, the three arrived at Glastonbury Abbey to meet with Cheltingham. Before she arrived, they followed a light in the Lady Chapel, which led them to an altar underground, where a cloaked figure sought for them to guard the spear. Chasing the mysterious blond woman into the garden, they encountered Cheltingham, who pointed out the true Holy Thorn and had provided them with a getaway car and driver, her student Rebecca Stein. When O'Neal thanked the elder botanist with a kiss, Cheltingham gave him a sprig of the real thorn for luck, and they drove off, with the Nazis in chase again.

During the car chase, Indiana took the half of the spear tip from O'Neal, and began shooting at their pursuers. A bullet aimed for Indy's chest curved out of the way at the last moment, hitting the car instead—thanks to the mystical powers of the spear tip in Indy's shirt pocket. Firing back, Jones caused his pursuers to crash, and Stein drove them to Wales, explaining her calm demeanor under fire as a result of having had to escape the Nazis previously, as a Jewish refugee.

=== Wales ===
All three men tried to impress Stein, but she shrugged them off for not being Jewish. A flat tire forced them to stop, near Gorsedd Arbeth. While O'Neal changed the tire, Indiana climbed a hill to rest. Falling asleep, he received another vision from the mysterious blond woman, urging onward in his quest to find and protect the spear, and warned him of an impending attack and a path for escape. Jones awoke to being punched by Kurt. Dieterhoffmann and his men had caught up to them, and had already seized Stein and the elder Jones, with O'Neal escaping. Taking back the half of the spear tip from Jones, the Nazis tied Indiana Jones to a boulder, and dropped him off the cliff, and set off with Stein and Henry Jones as captives.

At the bottom of the lake, his vision's message became clear - an underwater trove of ancient arms allowed Indy to cut his bonds, and he took the tip of one of the weapons as a souvenir. O'Neal helped haul him out of the water, and the two tried to find a vehicle to take to the ferry terminal at Holyhead.

Jones and O'Neal arrived at Holyhead, and hid in the shadows and formed a plan to recover the spear tip and rescue the captives as the Nazis commandeered the ferry. O'Neal called out to the Nazis from an upper deck of the ferry, which diverted their attention, allowing Professor Jones to escape, and Indiana Jones the chance to sneak up on Seigfried and pull a knife to him. With the tables turned, Dieterhoffmann gave up a bundle containing the spear tip to O'Neal. When Seig realized that Jones wouldn't actually harm him, he let his father know, who then sent his men after Jones. O'Neal distracted them again by throwing the spear tip package into the water, and then leaping into the water himself. While some of the Nazis dove in after the spear tip, Jones tried to free Stein, but Kurt grabbed her first. Unable to rescue her, Indiana fled into the water, where he and O'Neal were picked up by Henry Jones in a small sailboat and followed the ferry toward Ireland.

=== At sea ===
Drying off in the boat, the three commiserated on losing Rebecca Stein again, but were glad to have recovered half of the spear tip—O'Neal had secretly swapped Dieterhoffmann's spear tip bundle with a bundle containing the Celtic weapon fragment. They spied a submarine snorkel, closing to provide an escort for the Nazis on the ferry. An underwater mine exploded, causing O'Neal and the spear tip to be knocked out of the ship. After grabbing the spear tip, Indiana dove in to pull O'Neal to safety. Back in the boat, Henry noticed that the spear tip half pointed itself in a heading to lead them to where they needed to go.

=== Ireland, March 21, 1945 ===
Landing on the east coast of Ireland, Indiana Jones went off in the rain to rescue Stein at Connely's Inn, while Henry Jones and O'Neal were sent to the dig site to assemble the spear from the components they had.

At Connely's Inn, Dieterhoffmann and his Nazis wore their uniforms as they met with Connely and his Blueshirt unit. With Jones in possession of a piece of the spear tip, Dieterhoffmann was furious, and Stein's comments made him even madder. While Jones climbed up the outside of the building, Dieterhoffmann struck Stein to the ground, an action that prompted an outburst from his son. As Dieterhoffmann explained his notions regarding Stein's heritage, Jones appeared at the top of the stairs, having taken Bobby at knife point as a hostage in trade for Stein.

When Dieterhoffmann refused to trade for the Blueshirt's life, Connely objected, and Dieterhoffmann rebuffed his Irish allies, and sent Kurt to get Jones. Kurt climbed the stairs, and Jones pushed his hostage at him. Kurt grabbed Bobby and threw him over the staircase, which killed the lad. Pete jumped up to avenge Bobby and attacked Kurt. In the commotion, Jones grabbed Stein, and pulled her up the stairs, just as she snatched a spear tip bundle from Seigfried's pocket. After Kurt bested Pete, Connely clubbed the Nazi brute in the back of the head. Losing control of his former allies, Dieterhoffmann shot Connely before Kurt could be hit again. Upstairs, Stein gave Jones a stolen piece of the spear, and then the two jumped from the upper story window and escaped by car.

Driving across the land, Jones and Stein crashed into a bog, and set out on foot, with Jones carrying the skirted Stein across the muck. The Nazis pursued, and one car containing Jorge and Seigfried also crashed in the mire. Knowing where Jones was headed, Dieterhoffmann stopped to pick up his vehicle-less men.

Inside the mound, O'Neal recounted the history of the Spear of Lugh, a legendary Celtic weapon, and Henry Jones noted similarities in its lore to the Spear of Longinus, as quoted from Le Morte d'Arthur, and they concluded that it was likely that they were one and the same – the spear had started in Ireland, and was taken to Wales, which was conquered by Romans, who took it to Jerusalem, and then it returned to Britain with Joseph of Arimathea. O'Neal assembled the half of the spear tip to a shaft of yew and attached the sprig of the Holy Thorn to it. Jones and Stein arrived, but the piece that they had taken from Seigfried was a decoy.

The Nazis arrived, and as Kurt reached for the partially assembled spear, the missing spear tip half shot out of Dieterhoffmann's pocket and reattached itself to the rest of spear, which then took flight around the room. Kurt was impaled, and the cavern started to collapse. Trying to find safe ground, O'Neal stepped on a large spiral carving, which began to shriek – O'Neal had stepped on the Stone of Fal and was a true king of Ireland. The spear commanded the spear to come to him, but it drove into his chest. Henry Jones took the spear, and the morning light of the Equinox shone in, illuminating the spear and the Stone. Professor Jones, Dieterhoffmann, and Seigfried witnessed the marvel of blood streaming from the tip of the spear, though Indiana, a skeptic, was unable to see the miracle. As Seigfried prayed in thanksgiving for witnessing the spectacle, his father began bleeding heavily and collapsed in death. The cavern started to crumble again, and everyone tried to escape. After Henry Jones let go of the spear, Otto Nehrkorn stole the spear tip and was chased by Indiana Jones. Jones stopped his pursuit to pull the rapt Seigfried to safety. Aboveground, Nehrkorn escaped in the one remaining car, and O'Neal, Stein and the Joneses watched Seigfried die in religious ecstasy. Using a quote from The Quest of the Holy Grail, the senior Jones uttered a brief eulogy over the lad. The mound collapsed in on itself, and grass mystically regrew over it, which O'Neal took as a superstitious sign to keep out.

=== New York City, August 1945 ===
Indiana Jones met up with O'Neal in a New York City bar where O'Neal worked as a bartender. He related how he had returned to Wales to try to find the treasure cache but was unsuccessful. O'Neal surprised Jones by revealing that he still had the Celtic weapon tip. Jones then related how he had heard that the American forces had found the Spear tip when they had taken Nuremberg, and that the Spear now was in the hands of the American government. Just as he finished his explanation, a radio news flash announced the atomic bombing of Japan, and Jones and O'Neal were reminded of the Spear's power. A young blond lady asked for a drink and a place to hang her union rally sign, and both Jones and O'Neal mistook her for the mysterious blond woman.
