= Superman & Lois season 3 =

Superman & Lois
- Season 3
- Original poster
- Showrunner: Todd Helbing
- Starring: Tyler Hoechlin; Elizabeth Tulloch; Alex Garfin; Michael Bishop; Erik Valdez; Inde Navarrette; Wolé Parks; Tayler Buck; Sofia Hasmik; Chad L. Coleman; Dylan Walsh; Emmanuelle Chriqui
- No. of episodes: 13

Release
- Original network: The CW
- Original release: March 14 – June 27, 2023

Season chronology
- ← Previous; Season 2 Next → Season 4

The third season of the American television series Superman & Lois premiered on The CW on March 14, 2023. The series is based on the DC Comics characters Superman and Lois Lane created by Jerry Siegel and Joe Shuster. The season was produced by Berlanti Productions, and Warner Bros. Television.

The series stars Tyler Hoechlin and Elizabeth Tulloch as the titular characters, Clark Kent / Superman, a costumed superhero, and his wife, Lois Lane, the world's best and most famous reporter. Also returning are main cast members Alex Garfin, Erik Valdez, Inde Navarrette, Wolé Parks, Dylan Walsh, Emmanuelle Chriqui, Tayler Buck, and Sofia Hasmik. They are joined by Michael Bishop – replacing Jordan Elsass in the role of Jonathan Kent – and Chad L. Coleman. Superman & Lois was renewed for a fourth season in June 2023, which was later revealed to be its final season in November.

== Episodes ==
No. overall	No. in season	Title	Directed by	Written by	Original release date	U.S. viewers (millions)
31	1	"Closer"	Tom Cavanagh	Brent Fletcher & Todd Helbing	March 14, 2023	0.75
27 days after Ally Allston's defeat, Jordan engages in superheroics against Clark's wishes. Sam rejoins the D.O.D. alongside John and goes to a movie with Natalie, but only to try to recruit her for the D.O.D. Academy, upsetting her. Lois visits the doppelgänger of John's sister Dr. Darlene Irons and learns that John's doppelgänger sold weapons to Bruno Mannheim and that she may be pregnant. At the twins' 16th birthday party, Sarah and Jordan break up, Jonathan passes his driver's exam given by a reluctant Coach Gaines, ex-mayor George Dean implores Lana to return funds she reallocated to stop a black mold problem at Smallville High, Natalie gives Sam another chance, and Kyle and Chrissy leave to sleep together. Clark leaves to stop a super-powered Henry Miller / Atom Man and is disoriented by a masked figure who apparently kills and abducts Miller. The next morning, Lana and Kyle finalize their divorce. Dr. Irons tells Lois that she is not pregnant and asks to run more tests. Bruno and the figure oversee Miller being revived by Dr. Aleister Hook.
32	2	"Uncontrollable Forces"	Elizabeth Henstridge	Katie Aldrin	March 21, 2023	0.66
Sarah and Natalie run into the twins at a party in Metropolis. While there, Natalie chats with a boy named Matteo, Jonathan's ex-girlfriend Eliza tries to kiss him, Sarah and Jordan agree to remain friends, and they leave after fighting with the host. Dean calls Lana saying that everything was for "the pride of Smallville" and is killed by the figure. Using his words as a clue, Lana and John find a flash drive in the town hall, but the figure attacks them and steals it. Meanwhile, Clark and Lois interview Judge Tara Reagen, who released Miller, and are forced out by Elias Orr when they question if she was pressured into releasing him. Bruno denies involvement with Miller and Intergang to Superman and says that he gives hope to the people Superman does not save. Lois talks Reagen out of a rooftop suicide attempt and reveals to her and Superman that she has been diagnosed with stage 3 inflammatory breast cancer. That night, the figure tells Bruno about John, who sets up a security system in Lana's house while Lois reveals her diagnosis to the twins.
33	3	"In Cold Blood"	Gregory Smith	Jai Jamison	March 28, 2023	0.64
Clark has nightmares of Lois dying. They tell their friends and family about her diagnosis. Lois misses her chemotherapy appointments in order to investigate Bruno and finds fresh blood. The next day, she and Chrissy are cornered by Intergang members led by Mike Gunn in a warehouse. Superman and John rescue them before the warehouse explodes, though the former struggles against Gunn's weapons. Meanwhile, Natalie decides to give her mom's watch to Lois and engraves the teens' names on it, but Candice's father Emmet steals Jonathan's truck with the watch inside. Natalie and the twins steal it back, and Jonathan tells Candice about Eliza kissing him. After Kyle asks Lana about John's security system, Lana asks Sarah to stop telling Kyle certain things and unthinkingly slaps her in their ensuing argument. That night, Sam finds that Lois's sample is of Superman's blood, which Dr. Hook is pumping into Miller. Kyle comforts Sarah. The next morning, Natalie gives Lois the watch and she and Clark leave for her appointment.
34	4	"Too Close to Home"	Stewart Hendler	Juliana James	April 4, 2023	0.70
After Jordan is spotted with Superman, Sam tries to get him a haircut. Kyle talks to Sarah and Lana separately, and the two meet and reconcile. When confronted about the truck, Emmet gives Jonathan a black eye and pulls a gun on Lois. Meanwhile, John learns about his doppelgänger's involvement with Intergang. He meets with Darlene and is quickly confronted by Bruno, who straps a bomb to Darlene's chest in order to coerce John into walking away. John rescues her, but refrains from killing Bruno who still has eyes on his doppelgänger's family. Sam finds that Intergang synthesized Superman's blood using D.O.D. samples, so Superman destroys them all. That night, after learning what Emmet has done, Clark scares him into skipping town and has Candice stay with his family. Sam presents Jordan with a suit so he will not have to cut his hair. Lois signs up as a chemo patient at a hospital in Hob's Bay, an area run by Bruno.
35	5	"Head On"	David Ramsey	Andrew N. Wong	April 11, 2023	0.65
Jordan brings Matteo to see Natalie. Kyle offers Jonathan a weekend job at the fire station. After being angrily confronted by George Dean Jr., Lana learns that some people in Smallville still do not trust her and Chrissy offers to expose Dean's actions. At Hob's Bay, Clark chats with chemo patients. Lois runs into Bruno who is willing to treat her cancer as long as she doesn't stop him from trying to help his community. At a Valentine's Day dance, Sarah comforts George Jr. and Natalie runs off when Matteo tries to kiss her, but Sam convinces her to go back. Candice tells Jonathan that she'll be moving to her aunt's house in Topeka and that they can only meet on weekends, but convinces him to take the job anyway. Meanwhile, Superman defeats Jason Distefano / Deadline, but not before he sends the locations of several D.O.D. facilities to Intergang. Kyle and Chrissy spend the night together. The next morning, Lana asks Chrissy not to expose Dean, believing that the town needs closure. Sam tells Clark and Lois about the raids and Bruno recovers the Inverse Superman's body.
36	6	"Of Sound Mind"	Diana Valentine	George Kitson	April 25, 2023	0.61
One month later, Clark joins a support group for chemo patients' spouses. Distefano suffers from tumors and is brought to Bruno by Superman, but is dismissed and Distefano dies in the hospital. Lois shares a meal with a patient who trusts in Bruno's philanthropy. Jordan tries to convince Clark that he is ready to help, but is agitated by the endless lessons. Clark tries to apologize, but the figure baits him using Lois's voice and ambushes him with Kryptonite blasters. Jordan is blasted while trying to rescue him, but they escape and realize that Jordan is not as vulnerable to Kryptonite. Meanwhile, Sarah and Jonathan lose track of Sophie. Jonathan finds her at the county fair and convinces her that her family hasn't forgotten about her. As thanks, Kyle gives Jonathan a new uniform. After Lana sees Kyle and Chrissy together, they go public with their relationship. The figure tells Bruno that her powers are fading. She is revealed to be Peia, Bruno's wife and the patient Lois was with, and Bruno promises to save her.
37	7	"Forever and Always"	Alvaro Ron	Adam Mallinger	May 2, 2023	0.66
The twins beg Lara to use Kryptonian technology to save Lois, but she tells them that it could kill her. Clark forces them home and they find Lois's will. At Hob's Bay, Bruno and Peia are upset by Clark's and Lois's questioning. Lois apologizes and asks Peia to be friends, but Bruno and Peia reveal their marriage. Meanwhile, Sarah lashes out at Chrissy, but ultimately joins her for a movie and discovers her edibles. After John intimidates Matteo at lunch with Natalie, Lana advises him to trust Natalie's judgment and he apologizes to Matteo. That night, the twins confront their parents and remind them that Lois is not invincible. Clark and Lois tell them that they feel it is unfair to use technology that they cannot let the world use. Sarah and Lana set off fireworks together. Matteo's parents are revealed to be Bruno and Peia. In flashbacks, Bruno resolves to fix up the Suicide Slums, and Peia defends him by killing Boss Moxie and those loyal to him with her powers.
38	8	"Guess Who's Coming to Dinner"	Gregory Smith	Aaron Helbing	May 9, 2023	0.55
Kyle promotes Jonathan. A fire breaks out and Kyle has Jonathan stay by the truck, but Jordan rescues someone and leaves them by him, leading Kyle to believe that Jonathan disobeyed him. While searching for evidence on Bruno, Sam misses a date and instead talks with Lana. Clark and Chrissy interview a chemo patient who knew Peia, but learn nothing. The group discovers that Bruno framed Lex Luthor for Moxie's death using Peia's voice mimicking powers. Natalie meets Matteo's parents, unaware of who they are. While with Darlene, John learns that the restaurant Natalie is at is where his doppelgänger would meet with Bruno. John goes there and fights Bruno and Peia and is joined by Superman. Peia faints while using her powers and Superman brings her to the DOD. Meanwhile, the twins argue about the fire. Sarah helps Jordan see Jonathan's perspective and he convinces her to go to The Cure concert with Lana. Jordan apologizes and Jonathan tells him that Kyle knows that someone with powers is intervening. Lois worries that Luthor was wrongfully imprisoned, John orders Natalie not to see Matteo and takes her phone, Matteo argues with his dad, and the Inverse Superman's eyes open.
39	9	"The Dress"	Stephen Maier	Kristi Korzec	May 23, 2023	0.60
In flashbacks, Clark buys Lois a dress to wear to a gala for her nomination for a journalism award. In the present, Jordan asks Jonathan not to tell their parents about what Kyle said. At the DOD, John demands that Bruno turn over all stolen DOD assets in exchange for visiting Peia. Bruno refuses and has Orr lead an attack on John and Natalie, but they pull back due to witnesses. John retaliates by leading on a DOD raid on Bruno's apartment. Meanwhile, Lois tries to give the dress to Lana and the two talk about her upcoming double mastectomy. Jonathan advises Natalie to give up on seeing Matteo. He later apologizes and has Matteo come to Smallville and Natalie learns that John has been keeping Peia from her family. Bruno orders a revived Miller to attack John, wrecking his house and Main Street in the ensuing fight, and John kills Miller in self-defense. Later, Bruno shows Matteo the Inverse Superman's body and plans to use it to make a cure for Peia. Lois puts on the dress and flies with Clark.
40	10	"Collision Course"	Elaine Mongeon	Max Cunningham & Max Kronick	May 30, 2023	0.66
Lois finishes chemotherapy. At the DOD, she tries to get Peia to confess to framing Luthor. Lana and Chrissy meet with Governor Kerry Wexler. Clark tries to spend time with the twins, but they decide to go to a party. While there, Jordan interrupts a conversation between Sarah and George Jr., upsetting her. The police bust the party and Sarah and George Jr. crash her car while trying to escape, but Jordan rescues them. Kyle arrives and George Jr. tells him that he saw someone with powers while Sarah is charged with a DUI. They go to the diner where Wexler leaves after seeing Sarah under arrest. Matteo visits Peia and secretly gives her Bruno's cure. With her powers restored, she forces Lois to help her escape and wrecks the DOD. Meanwhile, Jordan admits to being spotted. Clark realizes that he was drinking and also confronts Jonathan, who admits to going to the party but did not drink anything. Kyle, convinced that Jonathan has powers, confronts Clark, who flies off and promises to explain the next day. Peia reunites with Bruno and Matteo.
41	11	"Complications"	Jai Jamison	Teleplay by : Katie Aldrin & George Kitson; Story by : Brent Fletcher & Todd Helbing	June 6, 2023	0.66
Peia fakes attacks to mask her location. After learning that Clark is Superman, Kyle gets upset with Chrissy for lying about people with powers intervening. The next day, Natalie secretly leaves a device for Matteo in his apartment. Sarah worries that her life is ruined and that Jordan hates her and is consoled by Lana and Kyle. Before Lois goes into surgery, Jordan suffers a panic attack. Clark realizes his x-ray vision is coming in and Jonathan helps him calm down. While the Mannheims prepare to flee, Peia loses control of her powers, causing power outages and killing Elias Orr. Matteo finds Natalie's device, summoning her to the apartment with John and Bruno following. Superman flies Peia into the sky and tells her that it's okay to let go. She dies and Superman delivers her last words to her family. Bruno agrees to cooperate with the DOD in exchange for Matteo's charges being dropped. Lois wakes, Sarah becomes a waitress at the diner, Kyle apologizes to Chrissy, and the Inverse Superman wakes again.
42	12	"Injustice"	Sudz Sutherland	Michael Narducci	June 20, 2023	0.66
In flashbacks to his incarceration at Stryker's Prison, Luthor coerces Warden William Ellis and the inmates, including Otis Grisham, into serving him. In the present, Luthor is released from prison and has Ellis delay the news. George Jr. is interviewed about his rescuer. Jordan praises the rescuer, upsetting Sarah, who feels that it isn't fair to have to keep Jordan's secret if he's going to brag about it. Lana tells Clark and Lois and they take his suit at Sam's suggestion. Meanwhile, Jonathan worries that Kyle is treating him differently. Clark overhears and talks to Kyle. Kyle tells Jonathan to keep things between them. Jordan argues with Sarah at the diner. As a tornado sweeps in, Jordan goes to Sam and takes his suit back before helping Superman get rid of the tornado. The public embraces him and he goes viral. That night, Jordan argues with his parents about their restrictions. Sarah asks Lana to dye her hair. Luthor appears at the Kent house and demands that Lois retire. He leaves with Otis and they locate the Inverse Superman.
43	13	"What Kills You Only Makes You Stronger"	Gregory Smith	Brent Fletcher & Todd Helbing	June 27, 2023	0.73
32 days later, Smallville prepares for a meteor shower celebration. Chrissy learns that she is pregnant, and she and Kyle tell their friends and family. The Kent family plans a trip to Italy, Sam offers John a job creating tech for the DOD in Metropolis, Natalie hears that Matteo enrolled in the DOD academy, John and Lana go on a date, Jonathan struggles to gain Coach Gaines' forgiveness, and Clark pushes Jordan to reconcile with Sarah, though they decide not to remain friends. Meanwhile, Luthor has Judge Reagen killed. Sam meets with Gretchen, a woman he met online who abducts him and delivers him to Luthor. At the celebration, Gaines gives the hard work credit to Jimmy Chan while Kyle and Chrissy get engaged. After discovering that the Inverse Superman is revived and strengthened each time he dies, Luthor repeatedly kills him and transforms him into a monster. (Note: Identified off-screen as Doomsday.) Luthor unleashes his creation on Superman, who after a battle impales it on a spike. The monster revives, becoming more powerful and renders Clark unconscious, carrying him into space. Remembering his family, Clark continues the fight on the Moon, where they start hurtling at each other with deadly intent.

== Cast and characters ==
=== Main ===
- Tyler Hoechlin as Kal-El / Clark Kent / Superman (Note: Hoechlin also portrays Superman's Inverse World Bizarro counterpart in a less prominent capacity.)
- Elizabeth Tulloch as Lois Lane
- Alex Garfin as Jordan Kent
- Michael Bishop as Jonathan Kent
- Erik Valdez as Kyle Cortez
- Inde Navarrette as Sarah Cortez
- Wolé Parks as John Henry Irons
- Tayler Buck as Natalie Lane Irons
- Sofia Hasmik as Chrissy Beppo
- Chad L. Coleman as Bruno Mannheim
- Dylan Walsh as Samuel Lane
- Emmanuelle Chriqui as Lana Lang

=== Special guest ===
- Jenna Dewan as Lucy Lane (voice)

=== Recurring ===
- Mariana Klaveno as Lara Lor-Van
- Angel Parker as Darlene Irons
- Paul Lazenby as Henry Miller / Atom Man and Doomsday
- Spence Moore II as Matteo Mannheim
- Daya Vaidya as Peia Mannheim / Onomatopoeia
- Dylan Leonard as George Dean Jr.
- Samantha Di Francesco as Candice Pergande

=== Guest ===
- Christine Willes as Kerry Wexler
- Michael Cudlitz as Lex Luthor
- Ryan Jefferson Booth as Otis Grisham
- Rebecca Staab as "Gretchen Kelly" / Cheryl Kimble

== Production ==
=== Development ===
On March 22, 2022, The CW renewed the series for a third season.

=== Casting ===
Main cast members Tyler Hoechlin, Elizabeth Tulloch, Alex Garfin, Erik Valdez, Inde Navarrette, Wolé Parks, Dylan Walsh, Emmanuelle Chriqui, Tayler Buck, and Sofia Hasmik return as Kal-El / Clark Kent / Superman, Lois Lane, Jordan Kent, Kyle Cushing, Sarah Cortez, John Henry Irons, Samuel Lane, Lana Lang, Natalie Lane Irons, and Chrissy Beppo. Jordan Elsass, who portrayed Jonathan Kent, departed the series ahead of the third season for personal reasons. The following month, his role was recast to Michael Bishop and Chad L. Coleman was cast as Bruno Mannheim. In January 2023, Michael Cudlitz was announced to be portraying Lex Luthor.

In June 2023, it was announced that this would be the last season to feature Valdez, Navarrette, Parks, Walsh, Chriqui, Buck, and Hasmik as series regulars. Each of them ultimately returned for the final season in limited capacities and retained main cast billing for the episodes they appeared in.

=== Filming ===
Filming for the season began on September 6, 2022, in Vancouver and concluded on March 14, 2023.

== Release ==
The season premiered on The CW on March 14, 2023. It consisted of 13 episodes. The season finale aired on June 27, 2023. The third season was released on the Max streaming service on July 28, 2023. It was released on DVD and Blu-ray on June 11, 2024.

== Ratings ==
Viewership and ratings per episode of Superman & Lois season 3
No.	Title	Air date	Rating (18–49)	Viewers (millions)
1	"Closer"	March 14, 2023	0.1	0.75
2	"Uncontrollable Forces"	March 21, 2023	0.1	0.66
3	"In Cold Blood"	March 28, 2023	0.1	0.64
4	"Too Close to Home"	April 4, 2023	0.1	0.70
5	"Head On"	April 11, 2023	0.1	0.65
6	"Of Sound Mind"	April 25, 2023	0.1	0.61
7	"Forever and Always"	May 2, 2023	0.1	0.66
8	"Guess Who's Coming to Dinner"	May 9, 2023	0.1	0.55
9	"The Dress"	May 23, 2023	0.1	0.60
10	"Collision Course"	May 30, 2023	0.1	0.66
11	"Complications"	June 6, 2023	0.1	0.66
12	"Injustice"	June 20, 2023	0.1	0.66
13	"What Kills You Only Makes You Stronger"	June 27, 2023	0.1	0.73
