= Superman & Lois season 2 =

Superman & Lois
- Season 2
- Original poster
- Showrunner: Todd Helbing
- Starring: Tyler Hoechlin; Elizabeth Tulloch; Jordan Elsass; Alex Garfin; Erik Valdez; Inde Navarrette; Wolé Parks; Tayler Buck; Sofia Hasmik; Dylan Walsh; Emmanuelle Chriqui
- No. of episodes: 15

Release
- Original network: The CW
- Original release: January 11 – June 28, 2022

Season chronology
- ← Previous; Season 1 Next → Season 3

The second season of the American television series Superman & Lois premiered on The CW on January 11, 2022, and concluded on June 28, 2022, airing 15 episodes. The series is based on the DC Comics characters Superman and Lois Lane created by Jerry Siegel and Joe Shuster. The season was produced by Berlanti Productions, DC Entertainment, and Warner Bros. Television. Initially considered to be part of the shared fictional Arrowverse (where Hoechlin and Tulloch originated their roles) in the first season, the second season establishes the series set in an alternate universe from the Arrowverse.

The series stars Tyler Hoechlin and Elizabeth Tulloch as the titular characters, Clark Kent / Superman, a costumed superhero, and his wife, Lois Lane who deal with the Inverse Method cult led by Ally Allston who has swayed Lois' sister, Lucy to her side and has made an enemy of Bizarro for her supposed conquering of his world. Also returning are main cast members Jordan Elsass, Alex Garfin, Erik Valdez, Inde Navarrette, Wolé Parks, Dylan Walsh, and Emmanuelle Chriqui, with Tayler Buck and Sofia Hasmik being promoted from their guest and recurring status in the previous season. Superman & Lois was renewed for a second season by The CW in March 2021 and filming took place primarily in Surrey, British Columbia.

The season premiere was watched by 1.09 million viewers, becoming the CW's most-watched premiere for the 2021–22 season. Superman & Lois was renewed for a third season in March 2022.

== Episodes ==
No. overall	No. in season	Title	Directed by	Written by	Original release date	U.S. viewers (millions)
16	1	"What Lies Beneath"	Gregory Smith	Brent Fletcher & Todd Helbing	January 11, 2022	1.09
Three months have passed since Tal-Rho's defeat and Natalie's arrival. Lois is displeased with Chrissy's interviewees for the Gazette and busts Jonathan for nearly having sex with a girl. Lana helps mayoral candidate Daniel Hart in the election against Mayor George Dean. While rescuing a North Korean submarine, Superman suffers from a painful vision, and it happens again during an earthquake. He witnesses a team of young superpowered individuals rescuing people from the mines, and learns they're working for Lt. Gen. Mitch Anderson and the DOD since Superman refuses to prioritize America over the rest of the world. Meanwhile, Sarah returns home from camp, but acts distantly towards Jordan. In Metropolis, Natalie struggles to adjust to her new life. John contacts Lois, who talks with Natalie and allows her and John to stay with them. Deep in the mines, a gigantic hand smashes through one of the walls.
17	2	"The Ties That Bind"	David Ramsey	Kristi Korzec & Michael Narducci	January 18, 2022	1.10
Clark suffers another vision and visits Tal-Rho, who claims he is powerless though offers to help if taken to his fortress. Clark refuses, but later a vision prevents him from defeating Phillip Karnowski, so Anderson's team (now including Tag Harris) steps in. Meanwhile, comments from one of Lois's old sources threaten the Gazette, but she ignores it and interviews Dr. Faulkner about the tremors with Chrissy at the mines. Hart drops out of the race while Natalie befriends Sarah. Clark and Jordan agree to Tal-Rho's offer; he awakens a hologram of his and Clark's mother, Lara. As another tremor occurs, a monster attacks a group in the mines and Clark suffers another vision while Tal-Rho (who lied about his powers) briefly fights Jordan. Lara deduces that the visions are due to a cosmological event that coincides with the tremors. That night, Tal-Rho is returned to prison, Lana decides to run for mayor, Jonathan hypothesizes that his teammate Timmy is taking steroids, Sarah tells Jordan that she kissed a girl named Aubrey at camp, Dr. Faulkner calls her boss about what was in the mines, and Lois reveals to Chrissy that her old source is her sister Lucy Lane.
18	3	"The Thing in the Mines"	Gregory Smith	Katie Aldrin & Juliana James	January 25, 2022	0.90
Clark's visions worsen and he experiences outbursts with Jordan and Jonathan. Lana continues her campaign despite citizens having doubts due to the Tal-Rho incident. Sam advises Clark to settle his differences with Anderson and gets John access to the mines. Lois and Sam discuss his hesitation to contact Lucy, who nearly killed herself while in Ally Allston's cult. John discovers a detonated rock in the mines and is knocked out by Faulkner. After another detonation, a mysterious figure in a metal suit emerges and fights Superman. John regains consciousness and blasts away part of the helmet. Superman and the figure suffer more visions and the latter flees. Natalie confronts her father about him continuing to fight with the armor. Meanwhile, Jordan, while initially unsure about how to continue his relationship with Sarah, apologizes and gifts her Martha's necklace to display his commitment. Jonathan discovers his girlfriend, Candice, is selling a crystal substance and asks her for some. Sam arranges for Lois and Lucy to talk in person, but Ally appears in Lucy's place. In the arctic, the figure is revealed to be a scarred, pale version of Superman whose suit bears a mirrored image of Superman's crest.
19	4	"The Inverse Method"	Melissa Hickey	Jai Jamison & Andrew N. Wong	February 1, 2022	0.78
Five years prior, Lucy moved out of the Kent apartment after arguing with Lois over Ally. In the present, Ally threatens Lois. Under the alias Penelope Collins, Chrissy attends Ally's Inverse Method event while Lucy confronts Lois. Ally sees through Chrissy's disguise and plays live footage of Lois admitting she omitted details about how Lucy saw her "other half" in her article on Ally, straining Lois and Chrissy's friendship. Meanwhile, the Superman-like figure attacks Clark at the barn, but is repelled by John. Afterwards, John has Clark give their energy readings to Anderson. Against Clark's advice, Anderson's team attacks the figure at Salar de Uyuni. Clark and John arrive, and during the fight, two of the team are killed, Tag escapes with the figure's necklace, and John is injured and hospitalized. Meanwhile, Jonathan begins taking the crystal substance. That night, Dean promises to keep the Cushings' family business out of the election, Kyle visits a bartender, Sam agrees to secretly train Jordan, and Chrissy calls Ally for information on Lois.
20	5	"Girl... You'll Be A Woman, Soon"	Diana Valentine	Rina Mimoun & Adam Mallinger	February 22, 2022	0.79
Lois wonders if the cult is connected to the figure. She learns that Faulkner is a member and visits her only to find that the figure killed her and is tracking Ally. Chrissy visits Ally, who forces a mysterious pendant onto her, allowing her to meet a "bizarro" version of herself in an alternate world. Superman defends Ally from the figure, who he identifies as his other self. Superman defeats him and brings him to Lara. Meanwhile, Sam lets Jonathan come along for Jordan's training, but Jonathan takes the substance and acts aggressively. That night, at Sarah's quinceañera, Kyle learns from Tonya— the bartender, whom he was once having an affair with— that her girlfriend threatened to leak the affair to Dean. Sarah overhears and tells Lana in front of Kyle. Chrissy tells Lois that Ally's other self has taken over the other world. Jonathan develops powers thanks to the substance, and passes them off as his own to Jordan. At Tal-Rho's Fortress, Clark's other self tells him that Ally will destroy everything he loves unless he kills her.
21	6	"Tried and True"	Amy Jo Johnson	Max Kronick & Patrick Barton Leahy	March 1, 2022	0.76
Superman's other self warns that if Ally acquires both pendants, she will become godlike and says he is not powerful enough to destroy them. Meanwhile, Anderson is berated by his superior General Hardcastle for his poor partnership with Superman. Kyle tries to apologize to Lana, but she turns him away. Lana learns from Tonya that Kyle broke things off two years prior shortly after Sarah's accident. Jordan catches Jonathan with an inhaler, but he passes it off as Candice's. Sam brings Lucy to talk to Lois and forbids them from discussing Ally. They begin to bond again. At that night's football game, Jonathan is put into Timmy's position and Jordan overhears that it was because Timmy was caught with the same inhaler. He realizes Jonathan has been using X-Kryptonite and confronts him. Lucy argues with Lois over Ally and leaves. Lana tells Kyle to move out. Anderson arrests Superman for treason for withholding information, and imprisons him with Tal-Rho.
22	7	"Anti-Hero"	Elizabeth Henstridge	Max Cunningham & Michael Narducci	March 8, 2022	0.77
Jonathan is caught with Candice's X-K and Lois finds out. Lana advises her to listen to Jonathan regardless of his explanation. Sarah vents to Aubrey and she advises her to talk to Kyle. Meanwhile, Superman awakens in prison with Tal-Rho and begs Anderson to investigate Ally. After Anderson harms Tal-Rho to coerce Superman into giving information, the Kryptonian brothers fake a fight in order to break out. They flee to Tal-Rho's Fortress where Superman's other self states that he and his Tal-Rho were inseparable until his Tal-Rho's wife tried to kill him. Anderson steals X-K and Project 7734 weapons and locates Tal-Rho's Fortress, ultimately injuring Tal-Rho and killing Superman's bizarre duplicate. Superman brings Tal-Rho near the Sun, allowing him to heal before he returns him to prison. Clark returns home, Sarah finds Kyle, and Dean tries to use Kyle's affair to his advantage, but Lana convinces his supporters to ignore it. With a warrant out for his arrest, Anderson visits Ally with the inverse world's pendant.
23	8	"Into Oblivion"	Sudz Sutherland; Gregory Smith	Juliana James & Kristi Korzec	March 22, 2022	0.80
One year prior, Natalie chases John during a temporal anomaly and is lost for six months. In the present day, John awakens with brain trauma while Natalie struggles to forgive Clark. Sam discovers that Anderson stole the pendants while Lucy sends cryptic goodbyes. Chrissy joins Anderson and the cult at the mines where they open a portal to the Inverse World. Anderson steals the pendants and enters while Superman is able to pull Chrissy and Ally out, though Lucy is not found. Meanwhile, Kyle helps a reluctant Lana prepare for the "family values" questions for her debate with Dean. At school, Sarah asks Jordan if they can hang out with Aubrey. Football season is canceled, though Jonathan stays quiet about Candice and is forced to work at a convenience store. That night, Jordan defends Jonathan and Candice from an X-K dealer and skips out on Sarah. Natalie forgives Clark and he offers her and John a house owned by an old friend of his. Lucy arrives at Lois's door and states that she stayed behind. Sam brings her to her apartment, but she spikes his drink and steals his DOD keycard for Ally.
24	9	"30 Days and 30 Nights"	Ian Samoil	Katie Aldrin & Jai Jamison	March 29, 2022	0.68
Ally is freed from the DOD and Superman chases her into the Inverse World. A month passes without his return, so John begins filling in for him. On election day, Lana stands up for Jonathan when a parent rebukes him about football season. Jordan secretly rescues Kyle from a fire while John puts it out. He tells Lois, and she orders Jordan to not use his powers for vigilantism. Natalie gets upset at John for not remembering that it is the day her mother died. Sam realizes that the fire was at an X-K dealing hub and promises Jonathan immunity for his source, so Candice comes forward. Sam and Lois are captured at an X-K manufacturing hub, but are rescued by Jordan. Lana wins the election. John and Natalie reconcile and watch old videos of their Lois. Sarah is upset that Jordan missed the entire day and breaks up with him, believing that he is not putting her first. Later, the Inverse Jonathan arrives at the Kent house and tells Lois and Jordan that their Clark was "too late." Superman is shown on the ground.
25	10	"Bizarros in a Bizarro World"	Louis Shaw Milito	Brent Fletcher & Todd Helbing	April 26, 2022	0.83
In flashbacks, the histories of the Inverse World's inhabitants are shown. Kal-El is a celebrity and is close with Tal-Rho, who is married to Lana. Years later, he becomes obsessed with his fame and neglects his sons. Jonathan (known as Jon-El) develops powers and joins Ally alongside Lana (who also gains powers) and Tal-Rho. Lois and Jordan leave Kal-El and go into hiding with Sam as Ally takes control of the DOD and the media. After Anderson's arrival, he fails to merge with his other self, who is then killed by Jon-El. With Chrissy's help, he finds Lois. After Superman's arrival, he reconciles with Anderson and they fight Jon-El, Lana, and Tal-Rho. Jon-El kills Anderson and gives the pendants to Ally, who merges with her other self and instructs Jon-El to do the same. Jon-El exits the Inverse World and Tal-Rho allows Superman to chase after him.
26	11	"Truth and Consequences"	David Ramsey	Andrew N. Wong	May 3, 2022	0.73
Superman returns in time to stop Jon-El from merging with Jonathan. Clark tracks Jon-El using Jonathan's visions, but is stopped by Lana unaware that a month passed or that she won the election. The following day, Jon-El intimidates Sarah in her new car and kidnaps Lana. Lois realizes this and hides the truth from Sarah. Jon-El draws out and defeats Superman with kryptonite while summoning the Inverse Lana. She arrives in the mines and attacks John and Natalie, who were mining for X-K. Natalie stabs her and she flees back to the Inverse World. Jordan intercepts Jon-El and flies for the first time. In the sky, he knocks out Jon-El and nearly falls himself. Lana is able to remove the kryptonite in time for Superman to free her and rescue Jordan. Jon-El is remanded to DOD custody. Superman brings Lana home and tells her that Jon-El is not Jonathan. With his family's support, Clark tells Lana that he's Superman.
27	12	"Lies That Bind"	David Mahmoudieh	Rina Mimoun	May 31, 2022	0.71
Lana keeps Clark's secret, but is upset that her friendship with Lois was based on a lie. Her behavior causes Kyle to worry that she is dating someone else. John and Sam suggest destroying the portal to the Inverse World, but Clark refuses and releases Tal-Rho since their combined powers can destroy the pendant. Ally interrupts them and siphons Superman's power. John holds her off, and once the pendant is destroyed, she and Tal-Rho flee. Meanwhile, Jonathan skips his first day back at school with Jordan and Natalie. She offers him a suit that can stop Jon-El from merging with him. They go to the mines for X-K crystals that can power it, but lose them during a cave-in. Later, Lois apologizes to Lana. She reveals Jordan's secret and allows her to tell her family; she ultimately doesn't do so. After learning about Lana-Rho, she decides to temporarily cut contact with the Kent family. Kyle pushes Sarah to perform at open mic night at a local bar. In the Inverse World, Ally siphons the Inverse Tal-Rho's power, killing him.
28	13	"All Is Lost"	Elaine Mongeon	Kristi Korzec	June 7, 2022	0.71
Flashbacks show Ally and Lucy's first interactions five years prior. John learns about Natalie's suit and tries to destroy it, but it's impenetrable. Jordan asks Lana if he can reveal his secret to Sarah, but she tells him to stay away. She later worries that she's been making too many wrong decisions and is consoled by Kyle. Clark cheers Jordan up by training him at the Fortress. Meanwhile, Lois, Sam, and Chrissy locate Lucy at a cabin in Burnham Woods with other Inverse Society members. Ally arrives and begins siphoning Sam's energy, forcing Lucy to call for Superman, but she siphons his energy as well, weakening him to the point of a normal human. John and Natalie force her away and revive Superman at the DOD, where Lucy tearfully reconciles with Sam. Ally instructs Lana-Rho to finish off Superman and begins merging the two worlds.
29	14	"Worlds War Bizarre"	Sheelin Choksey	Michael Narducci	June 21, 2022	0.80
As the worlds begin merging, the sky turns red, the Inverse World's cube sun appears, and objects transport between the worlds. John flies Clark to the Fortress where Lara tells them that it could take time for Clark's powers to return. Against Sam's wishes, Lois and Chrissy inform Lana about Ally and the worlds' merging. She goes public with the information at a town hall meeting and says that Superman will not be able to save them. John locks Natalie's suit and urges her to protect her new family. He fights Ally in the space between worlds, but is defeated and loses contact with Natalie. Lana-Rho breaks Jon-El out and they attack the school, but are defeated by Jordan and Natalie. Sarah sees Jordan using his powers and realizes that Lana already knew, upsetting her. Kyle and the Kent family are suddenly transported to the Inverse World.
30	15	"Waiting for Superman"	Gregory Smith	Brent Fletcher & Todd Helbing	June 28, 2022	0.82
Chrissy urges everyone to be with their families. As people transport between the worlds, Lois is separated from her family. Natalie brings John his escape pod and they use it to destroy the portals, trapping themselves. Tal-Rho returns and flies Superman into the sun, restoring and supercharging his powers. He then rescues John and Natalie, splits Ally back in two, and separates the worlds. At a celebration, Lois reunites with her family, Clark and Lana reconcile, Sarah and Jordan rekindle their relationship, Lois tells Chrissy that Clark is Superman, and Lana tells Kyle that their relationship won't be the same again. Both Allys are imprisoned at the DOD, and they admit to Lois that they did not feel complete. John Diggle visits Irons, wanting to know why Bruno Mannheim killed this Earth's Irons. Tal-Rho buys trucks for Jonathan and Jordan and moves to the Inverse Smallville while Lucy moves to Metropolis. Clark creates a new Fortress in the ocean for his family.

== Cast and characters ==
=== Main ===
- Tyler Hoechlin as Kal-El / Clark Kent / Superman (Note: This actor also portrays their character's "Inverse World" Bizarro counterpart.)
  - Daniel Cudmore portrays Bizarro's armored appearance.
- Elizabeth Tulloch as Lois Lane
- Jordan Elsass as Jonathan Kent
- Alex Garfin as Jordan Kent
- Erik Valdez as Kyle Cushing
- Inde Navarrette as Sarah Cushing / Sarah Cortez (Note: In the episode "Girl...You'll Be A Woman, Soon", Sarah changes her last name to Cortez, which was her family's name before they changed it.)
- Wolé Parks as John Henry Irons
- Tayler Buck as Natalie Lane Irons
- Sofia Hasmik as Chrissy Beppo
- Dylan Walsh as Samuel Lane
- Emmanuelle Chriqui as Lana Lang-Cushing

=== Special guest ===
- Adam Rayner as Tal-Rho
- Jenna Dewan as Lucy Lane
- David Ramsey as John Diggle

=== Recurring ===
- Ian Bohen as Mitch Anderson
- Mariana Klaveno as Lara Lor-Van
- Rya Kihlstedt as Ally Allston
- Catherine Lough Haggquist as Kit Faulkner
- Djouliet Amara as Aubrey
- Wern Lee as Tag Harris
- Samantha Di Francesco as Candice Pergande

== Production ==
=== Development ===
On March 2, 2021, The CW renewed the series for a second season.

=== Casting ===
In June 2021, Sofia Hasmik was promoted to a series regular for the second season. In August, Tayler Buck, who guest starred in the first season, was promoted to a series regular for the second season. In October, Ian Bohen was cast in a recurring role as Lt.Gen. Mitch Anderson for the second season. Jenna Dewan reprises her role as Lucy Lane from Supergirl. David Ramsey reprises his role as the alternate version of John Diggle during the season finale in a special guest role.

=== Costume ===
This season features a new design of Superman's suit giving slight adjustment to his boots by adding more red, making it more accurate to the comics.

=== Filming ===
Principal photography began on September 15, 2021, and concluded on May 5, 2022.

== Release ==
The season began airing in the United States on The CW and in Canada on CTV Sci-Fi Channel on January 11, 2022. The finale aired on June 28, 2022.

In the United Kingdom, it premiered on BBC One and BBC iPlayer on July 16, 2022.

=== Home media ===
The entire season was released on HBO Max on July 29, 2022. It was later released on Blu-ray and DVD on September 27, 2022.

== Ratings ==
The premiere of Season 2 was the most-watched premiere for a CW show for the 2021-22 season, in addition to being the most-watched premiere for the channel since Kung Fu in April 2021. 420,000 US households streamed the episode within one day according to Samba TV.

Viewership and ratings per episode of Superman & Lois season 2
No.	Title	Air date	Rating (18–49)	Viewers (millions)	DVR (18–49)	DVR viewers (millions)	Total (18–49)	Total viewers (millions)
1	"What Lies Beneath"	January 11, 2022	0.2	1.09	—N/a	—N/a	—N/a	—N/a
2	"The Ties That Bind"	January 18, 2022	0.2	1.10	—N/a	—N/a	—N/a	—N/a
3	"The Thing in the Mines"	January 25, 2022	0.2	0.90	—N/a	—N/a	—N/a	—N/a
4	"The Inverse Method"	February 1, 2022	0.2	0.78	—N/a	—N/a	—N/a	—N/a
5	"Girl... You'll Be A Woman, Soon"	February 22, 2022	0.2	0.79	—N/a	—N/a	—N/a	—N/a
6	"Tried and True"	March 1, 2022	0.2	0.76	—N/a	—N/a	—N/a	—N/a
7	"Anti-Hero"	March 8, 2022	0.1	0.77	0.2	0.74	0.3	1.51
8	"Into Oblivion"	March 22, 2022	0.1	0.80	0.2	0.77	0.3	1.57
9	"30 Days and 30 Nights"	March 29, 2022	0.1	0.68	0.2	0.73	0.3	1.41
10	"Bizarros in a Bizarro World"	April 26, 2022	0.2	0.83	0.1	0.66	0.3	1.49
11	"Truth and Consequences"	May 3, 2022	0.2	0.73	—N/a	—N/a	—N/a	—N/a
12	"Lies That Bind"	May 31, 2022	0.1	0.71	—N/a	—N/a	—N/a	—N/a
13	"All Is Lost"	June 7, 2022	0.2	0.71	—N/a	—N/a	—N/a	—N/a
14	"Worlds War Bizarre"	June 21, 2022	0.1	0.80	—N/a	—N/a	—N/a	—N/a
15	"Waiting for Superman"	June 28, 2022	0.1	0.82	—N/a	—N/a	—N/a	—N/a
