= Superman & Lois season 1 =

Superman & Lois
- Season 1
- Original poster
- Showrunner: Todd Helbing
- Starring: Tyler Hoechlin; Elizabeth Tulloch; Jordan Elsass; Alex Garfin; Erik Valdez; Inde Navarrette; Wolé Parks; Adam Rayner; Dylan Walsh; Emmanuelle Chriqui
- No. of episodes: 15

Release
- Original network: The CW
- Original release: February 23 – August 17, 2021

Season chronology
- Next → Season 2

The first season of the American superhero television series Superman & Lois aired on The CW. It aired from February 23 to August 17, 2021. The series is based on the DC Comics characters Superman and Lois Lane, created by Jerry Siegel and Joe Shuster, and produced by Berlanti Productions, DC Entertainment, and Warner Bros. Television.

Tyler Hoechlin and Elizabeth Tulloch star as the titular characters, Clark Kent / Superman, a costumed superhero, and his wife, Lois Lane, as they struggle with the trials and tribulations of being parents, while facing the mysterious Captain Luthor and Morgan Edge. The main cast also includes Jordan Elsass, Alex Garfin, Erik Valdez, Inde Navarrette, Wolé Parks, Adam Rayner, Dylan Walsh, and Emmanuelle Chriqui. Superman & Lois was picked up for a full season by The CW in January 2020, and filming took place primarily in Surrey, British Columbia.

The series was initially considered to be part of the shared fictional Arrowverse, where Hoechlin and Tulloch originated their roles, with crossovers with Supergirl and Batwoman planned for this season before they were scrapped due to the COVID-19 pandemic. Towards the end of the filming of the season, showrunner Todd Helbing decided to have the series set in an alternate universe from the Arrowverse, which was confirmed by the end of the second season.

The pilot episode was watched by 1.75 million viewers, the second-best premiere of any CW series since the debut of Batwoman in October 2019. The season received generally positive reviews from critics and fans alike. Superman & Lois was renewed for a second season in March 2021.

== Episodes ==
No. overall	No. in season	Title	Directed by	Written by	Original release date	U.S. viewers (millions)
1	1	"Pilot"	Lee Toland Krieger	Teleplay by : Todd Helbing; Story by : Greg Berlanti & Todd Helbing	February 23, 2021	1.75
Edge EnerCorp buys out the Daily Planet. After losing his job and mother on the same day, Clark Kent attends her funeral in Smallville with his wife Lois Lane and their twin teenage sons Jonathan and Jordan. There, he reunites with Lana Lang and her husband Kyle Cushing, while his sons befriend her daughter Sarah. While the twins survive what should have been a fatal accident, the adults begin to suspect that Edge EnerCorp's CEO Morgan Edge, already responsible for Clark's dismissal, has nefarious plans for Smallville. Clark's sons discover his spaceship, so he reveals that he is Superman and that at least one of them must have inherited his powers to have survived. It turns out to be the loner Jordan when he runs afoul of Sarah's boyfriend, Sean Smith. Meanwhile, Superman and General Sam Lane are dealing with someone sabotaging nuclear power plants to study how Superman uses his abilities. Superman loses a fight with the man, who uses a powered exo-suit that conceals his identity ("Captain Luthor") via lead lining. Clark and Lois eventually decide to move into the Kent farm to allow Jordan privacy as he grows into his powers.
2	2	"Heritage"	Lee Toland Krieger	Todd Helbing	March 2, 2021	1.24
While Captain Luthor searches the globe for Kryptonite, Clark takes Jordan to the Fortress of Solitude to meet a virtual version of Jor-El, who helps him learn Krypton's history. Meanwhile, at Smallville High, Jonathan is relentlessly bullied by Sean and his friends on the school's football team. Lois questions Edge at a city council meeting about his plans for Smallville. Tests at the Fortress reveal that Jordan's powers are temperamental and extremely limited, disappointing Clark. The Kents attend a barbecue at the Cushings' home, where Lois argues with Kyle over Edge's proposal. Luthor attacks General Lane at the DOD and asks him to help destroy Superman before he can become a threat. General Lane reveals to Superman that he has been secretly stockpiling Kryptonite. After Edge turns her exposé on him into a puff piece, Lois quits the Daily Planet and joins the Smallville Gazette. At his base, Captain Luthor makes plans to build a new ship and armor while continuing to search for Kryptonite. A flashback to Luthor's world reveals that he is the last survivor of a military unit wiped out by an evil Superman.
3	3	"The Perks of Not Being a Wallflower"	Gregory Smith	Brent Fletcher	March 9, 2021	1.25
After being pushed around too many times by Sean and his friends, Jordan decides to push back by joining the team, gaining the respect of the coach and his new teammates. Clark allows Jordan to join the team, and takes a job as the school's assistant coach. Sarah breaks up with Sean and quits the cheerleading team after an argument with her mother. However, Lana and Sarah eventually make up after the former reveals the dysfunctional state of their family like her father sleeping on the couch, Sophie picking on the kids in her class, and Lana abusing sleeping medication. Lois finds a woman named Sharon Powell to talk to regarding Morgan Edge's previous dealings that involved her son Derek. "Subjekt-11", a man with super-strength that rivals Superman's, ambushes Lois when she goes to meet with Sharon, but Superman saves them both. Subjekt-11 is later trying to leave town while asking Morgan on the phone what Larr is going to do to clean up the incident. Morgan's personal assistant Leslie Larr appears in the road and uses her heat vision to kill him while destroying his car. She calls up Morgan and tells him "It's done. I'll call a team".
4	4	"Haywire"	James Bamford	Michael Narducci	March 16, 2021	1.21
General Lane asks Clark to escort Thaddeus Killgrave, who is being transferred out of Metropolis Penitentiary due to Superman's recent absence from the city. After Clark refuses to make an appearance in order to spend time with his family, Lane warns the twins not to distract their father from his role as Superman. Meanwhile, Lois asks Clark to show up to a town meeting to rally opposition to Edge's motion to re-open the local Shuster Mines. Superman gets tied up searching for Killgrave who was sprung out by Intergang, which results in Edge winning the mining vote. Meanwhile, Jonathan and Jordan's football teammate Tag Harris increasingly starts vibrating uncontrollably from his broken arm. The twins try unsuccessfully to help Tag, who is inadvertently becoming more and more dangerous. As Superman battles Killgrave, he hears Jonathan's ELT call for help, giving him added determination to quickly defeat Killgrave and come to the aid of his sons and Tag. Seeing that Clark is putting increased importance on his family, Lane initiates a contingency plan called Project 7734 inspired by the dog tag that Captain Luthor gave him. Meanwhile, Edge and Larr discover a supply of X-Kryptonite buried in the Shuster Mine.
5	5	"The Best of Smallville"	Rachel Talalay	Teleplay by : Brent Fletcher and Nadria Tucker; Story by : Todd Helbing	March 23, 2021	1.24
The Harvest Festival comes to Smallville. Eliza breaks up with Jonathan, who begins to act out (including drinking at the Festival). Sharon brings her son Derek to the Smallville Gazette, where he claims that he was in a coma and had suffered from memory loss. Suspicious, Chrissy tracks Derek after a fire breaks out at the Smallville Community Center (which Derek himself caused due to struggling with powers like Tag). Meanwhile, Captain Luthor introduces himself to Lois as Marcus Bridgewater and offers to help with her investigation on Edge. The Lois on his world who was his wife. Chrissy finds Derek with Larr, re-exposing him to X-Kryptonite radiation to stabilize his powers. Luthor tries to destroy both Derek and Superman, but both are unharmed. Derek uses his heat vision with his eyes closed and disintegrates. Lana presents a bench to the town that serves as a memorial to Martha. After a date at the Festival, Sarah and Jordan decide to remain as friends. While walking home, Jordan is ambushed by a super-powered Tag who wants to know what he did to him.
6	6	"Broken Trust"	Sudz Sutherland	Katie Aldrin	May 18, 2021	0.72
Jordan calls Superman for help, scaring Tag. As a result of his attack, Jordan develops a migraine when hearing high-pitched sounds, almost activating his heat vision. He chooses to not tell Clark, so he can still play in the game against Metropolis. While Smallville does win, Jordan is forced to reveal his condition to Clark after the Metropolis team tackles him. Meanwhile, Edge promotes Lana to a manager for his mining operation, much to her and Kyle's surprise. Lois approaches Lana about investigating Edge. Later, she and Marcus discover that the mine contains X-Kryptonite. Larr finds them and attacks, but Marcus knocks her out. Lois wants answers from Marcus, but is called by Clark. Superman finds Tag in Metropolis after Lana reports Tag kidnapped Sarah. Superman protects him from the DOD, who attempted to use real and Kryptonite bullets. Meanwhile, Jordan gets in a fight with the Metropolis team and is about to punch one of them when Jonathan steps in, accidentally breaking his wrist. The next day, Lana agrees to help Lois investigate Edge. Jordan's body starts going into shock, so Clark takes him to the Fortress.
7	7	"Man of Steel"	David Ramsey	Jai Jamison	May 25, 2021	0.80
Jordan's super-hearing has started to develop causing headaches, forcing him to stay home. Meanwhile, Lana must choose five candidates for Edge's "Leadership Program" involving her old friend Emily Phan. She assumes that these candidates will be in "Edge's X-Kryptonite Army". Lois arranges a meeting between Marcus and Superman in order to get the former to reveal his true identity, however, at the meeting Marcus attacks Superman using red solar flares and a special hammer. Jordan hears his father is in trouble and the twins save him by hitting Marcus with a truck. The DOD detains Marcus, whose real name is revealed as John Henry Irons. In flashbacks, Irons was married to Lois and had a daughter, Natalie. Superman and several others with Kryptonian abilities attacked Metropolis, killing Lois. Irons created his suit with Natalie and the AI was initially programmed for Lex Luthor of Irons' Earth.
8	8	"Holding the Wrench"	Norma Bailey	Kristi Korzec	June 1, 2021	0.90
Irons is interrogated at the DOD, but wants to only speak to Lois. Jonathan and Lois explore Irons' RV, where they find photos of him, as well as his Earth's Superman, Lois, and Natalie. When Jonathan explores the RV on his own, he has to be saved from the AI by Superman. Lois yells at Jonathan in anger, but Clark suggests that there is more on her mind. Lois returns to a therapist who helped her years earlier when she had a miscarriage with a baby girl, who would have been named Natalie. Meanwhile, Sarah tries out for a singing competition in school and is assisted by Jordan, after Kyle abandons her upon learning that he was not chosen for Edge's Leadership program. Lt. Rosetti displays Kryptonian powers when he tries to kidnap Irons. He fights Superman, weakened by Kryptonite gas, before being killed by Irons, who is talked down from killing Superman by Lois, who empathizes with his loss. Sam is forced to reveal Project 7734, an R&D Division for weapons designed to harm Superman if he should turn. Irons is released by the DOD and drives off, as Lois apologizes to Jonathan and reveals her miscarriage to him.
9	9	"Loyal Subjekts"	Eric Dean Seaton	Andrew N. Wong	June 8, 2021	0.92
Edge realizes that Lana has been feeding Lois intel after the latter confronts him about putting Kryptonian consciousnesses into people with help from Dabney Donovan. Jordan is infected by the Kryptonite gas inhaled by his father and is taken to the Fortress of Solitude so that Jor-El's A.I. can help heal him. This forces him to miss Sarah's talent show performance, causing a rift between the two. Meanwhile, Edge activates his Subjekts, including Emily, and has them attack the Kent farm. Jonathan and Sam fight them with Project 7734 weapons before Kyle arrives, revealing himself as one of Edge's Subjekts. Superman returns to the farm and drives the attackers away. Kyle returns home and tells Lana he blacked out and does not remember what happened. Clark and Lois realize that the reason Edge is staying in Smallville is that only the local people can become non-flawed Subjekts as they have been exposed to the X-Kryptonite in the ground for a long period of time. Edge later summons Superman. While sporting a Kryptonian outfit, Edge reveals that Superman is his Kryptonian "brother".
10	10	"O Mother, Where Art Thou?"	Harry Jierjian	Adam Mallinger	June 15, 2021	0.96
Edge reveals himself as Tal-Rho, son of Zeta-Rho and Lara Lor-Van, making him Kal-El's half-brother. When his mother, now married to Jor-El, first warned that Krypton was dying, his father sent him to Earth to resurrect Krypton with the Eradicator, the device used to implant Kryptonian minds and DNA into humans, created by their mother. His pod landed in England, where he was kept in prison and experimented on before escaping. Edge offers Superman the chance to join his "family" before leaving. Upon obtaining the Eradicator and the cooperation of Dabney Donovan, Superman and the DOD use it to implant his mother's mind into Lana, so she can reverse the process on Edge's Subjekts. Meanwhile, the twins tell Sarah the truth about Kyle and she sees the Kryptonian inside of him. Superman powers the Eradicator with a solar flare, returning everyone back to normal, including Kyle and Lana. Sam orders for Edge to be found. Superman lands close to the Fortress of Solitude with the Eradicator before passing out, now drained of his powers. Elsewhere, Edge and Larr are in a canyon, preparing their next move.
11	11	"A Brief Reminiscence In-Between Cataclysmic Events"	Gregory Smith	Brent Fletcher	June 22, 2021	0.85
Superman experiences flashbacks of his life before and after meeting Lois, including discovering his Kryptonian heritage, starting his career at The Daily Planet, fighting Atom Man, and first meeting Lois, their marriage, and the birth of the twin sons. Throughout these flashbacks, he sees images of a ghostly-figure in black, which he eventually deduces to be Tal-Rho. Superman awakes from his dream to discover Tal-Rho had followed him to the Fortress of Solitude and explored his memories using Kryptonian technology invented by Ter-Loc, revealing Superman's human family. Tal-Rho demands Superman's allegiance, but is refused. A weakened Superman is unable to prevent Tal-Rho from destroying the crystal housing the copy of Jor-El's consciousness and leaving for the Kent farm and threatening his family. At the Kent farm, Superman arrives just in time to save his family, swearing allegiance to Tal-Rho in exchange for their safety. Tal-Rho takes Superman to his desert fortress and places him in the Eradicator under the guidance of Zeta-Rho's holographic representation, while Lois calls John and expresses concern that Superman has been turned by Tal-Rho.
12	12	"Through the Valley of Death"	Alexandra La Roche	Katie Aldrin & Michael Narducci	July 13, 2021	0.87
Tal-Rho has implanted General Zod's consciousness into Superman, but he continues to try to fight his mind being taken over. Irons returns to Smallville ready to take down Superman with a red solar rocket he had designed on his Earth. Parts for the rocket are obtained from A.R.G.U.S. under false pretenses, delivered by John Diggle. Lois reveals to Irons that Clark is Superman and together with Diggle and Jonathan tries to convince him that he can still be saved. Elsewhere, the Cushings are being blamed by other Smallville residents for what happened with Edge. Jordan locates his father with his super-hearing and Irons goes out to confront him, discovering that Zod has taken over his mind. During the fight Superman temporarily breaks out from Zod's control and instructs Irons to kill him, but instead of doing so, Irons encourages him to fight back for his family, resulting in Superman successfully expelling Zod. Tal-Rho realizes that Zod is gone and escapes his Fortress with the Eradicator, chased by Superman and Irons. Tal-Rho heats up the Eradicator just as Irons shoots him with his rocket. Tal-Rho is captured as the DOD turn their attention to locating Leslie Larr.
13	13	"Fail Safe"	Ian Samoil	Jai Jamison & Kristi Korzec	July 20, 2021	0.84
Larr tries to attack the DOD facility housing Tal-Rho, but is intercepted and captured by Superman and Irons. With the final Kryptonian captured, Sam wants to disband Project 7734, but Superman opposes the idea and wants to preserve the weapons as a fail safe. Lois dislikes the idea, but finally agrees on the condition that the DOD hands the project over to Irons. Sam wants to bury the story of what really happened with Edge and initially Lois agrees, but after seeing the hardships faced by the Cushings and Lana snapping at Mayor Dean for lying about having their back, leaks the real story to Chrissy. In his Kryptonite chamber, Tal-Rho remembers his training and how he once disagreed with his father's ultimate plan for restoring Krypton, which would result in his own death. Now he agrees with the plan and allows the Eradicator to take over his mind. He breaks out of his chamber, escapes the DOD facility, and flies out to space to feed on solar energy.
14	14	"The Eradicator"	Alexandra La Roche	Max Cunningham & Brent Fletcher	August 10, 2021	0.73
Smallville businesses struggle while the residents grow angry with DOD's presence in the town. Chrissy gets an offer to sell the Gazette while the Cushings make plans to move out of town after Kyle gets a job offer in Bristol County. Sam tries to calm the residents at a town hall meeting, but fails when he is forced to dodge Sharon Powell's question about Derek's death after being informed that Tal-Rho has broken Larr out of the DOD facility. Superman and Irons confront Tal-Rho and Larr in Metropolis where Tal-Rho uses his new powers to create four new Subjekts out of the crowd and unleashes them on the city. While Superman and Irons are able to apprehend Larr and the four Subjects, Tal-Rho manages to escape. Meanwhile, Sam picks up the twins and Sarah from a party to take them to safety. They are attacked by Tal-Rho who kidnaps Jordan and implants Zeta-Rho's consciousness into him.
15	15	"Last Sons of Krypton"	Tom Cavanagh	Story by : Kristi Korzec & Michael Narducci; Teleplay by : Brent Fletcher & Todd Helbing	August 17, 2021	0.67
Zeta-Rho allows Jordan to contact Superman and keeps him busy, while Tal-Rho turns six DOD soldiers into Krypton's Defense Council. Tal-Rho enters the Shuster Mines to resurrect Krypton, while Superman and Irons fight Zeta-Rho and the Council. Irons knocks out Zeta-Rho and takes an unconscious Jordan to the farm, where Lois enters his mind with Tal-Rho's Kryptonian device and successfully convinces him of his strength, expelling Zeta-Rho. Meanwhile, Superman holds Tal-Rho in place while Irons throws his kinetic hammer, powered with solar energy, at him at maximum force, depowering him and ending the conflict. Superman goes public with the truth about Edge's origin. The Cushings decide to stay in Smallville after Kyle is offered his old job back. Lois purchases half of the Gazette to keep Chrissy from selling it away. Sam decides to step down from active duty at the DOD. Superman recovers the pieces of his father's crystal from the Fortress of Solitude and buries them at the Kent Farm. Irons plans to leave Smallville when a vessel locks onto his suit and lands at the farm. His daughter Natalie comes out of the vessel and reunites with Irons while mistaking Lois for her late mom.

== Cast and characters ==
=== Main ===
- Tyler Hoechlin as Kal-El / Clark Kent / Superman (Note: This actor also portrays a version of this character from John Henry Irons' Earth.)
- Elizabeth Tulloch as Lois Lane
- Jordan Elsass as Jonathan Kent
- Alex Garfin as Jordan Kent (Note: Garfin also portrays Zeta-Rho when in the body of Jordan Kent.)
- Erik Valdez as Kyle Cushing
- Inde Navarrette as Sarah Cushing
- Wolé Parks as John Henry Irons / "Captain Luthor" / "The Stranger" (Note: Parks' image was also used to portray Earth-Prime's John Henry Irons, who is mentioned to have been killed in action.)
- Adam Rayner as Tal-Rho / Morgan Edge / Eradicator
- Dylan Walsh as Samuel Lane
- Emmanuelle Chriqui as Lana Lang Cushing (Note: Chriqui also portrays Kal-El and Tal-Rho's mother, Lara Lor-Van, in the body of Lana Lang.)

=== Special guest ===
- David Ramsey as John Diggle

=== Recurring ===
- Stacey Farber as Irma Sayres / Leslie Larr
- Sofia Hasmik as Chrissy Beppo
- Angus Macfadyen as Jor-El
- Michele Scarabelli as Martha Kent
- Jill Teed as Sharon Powell
- A.C. Peterson as Zeta-Rho

=== Guest ===
- Daniel Cudmore as David Fuglestad
- Brendan Fletcher as Thaddeus Killgrave
- Tayler Buck as Natalie Lane Irons
- Wendy Crewson as Dr. Wiles

== Production ==
=== Development ===
Announced in October 2019, the executive producers for Superman & Lois were named as Todd Helbing, Greg Berlanti, Sarah Schecter and Geoff Johns around the same time. Helbing also penning the script for the series. The first season of the series was officially ordered by January 14, 2020, by The CW and was originally supposed to consist of 13 episodes. However, in January 2021, the television network ordered an additional two episodes, moving the episode count up to 15. On March 2, 2021, The CW renewed the series for a second season.

The pilot episode of Superman & Lois aired on February 23, 2021, with an encore presentation on February 27, on the cable network TNT, followed by the special, Superman & Lois: Legacy of Hope, which features behind the scenes footage, interviews with the cast, and special guests discussing the legacy of Superman. CTV Sci-Fi Channel aired the series in Canada. After a delay in production caused by COVID-19, the series went on hiatus after the fifth episode, during which the sixth and final season of Supergirl took over the seasons' timeslot.

=== Writing ===
In November 2020, series writer Nadria Trucker was fired after "pushing back on racist and sexist storylines" and working on all 15 episodes of the first season.

=== Casting ===
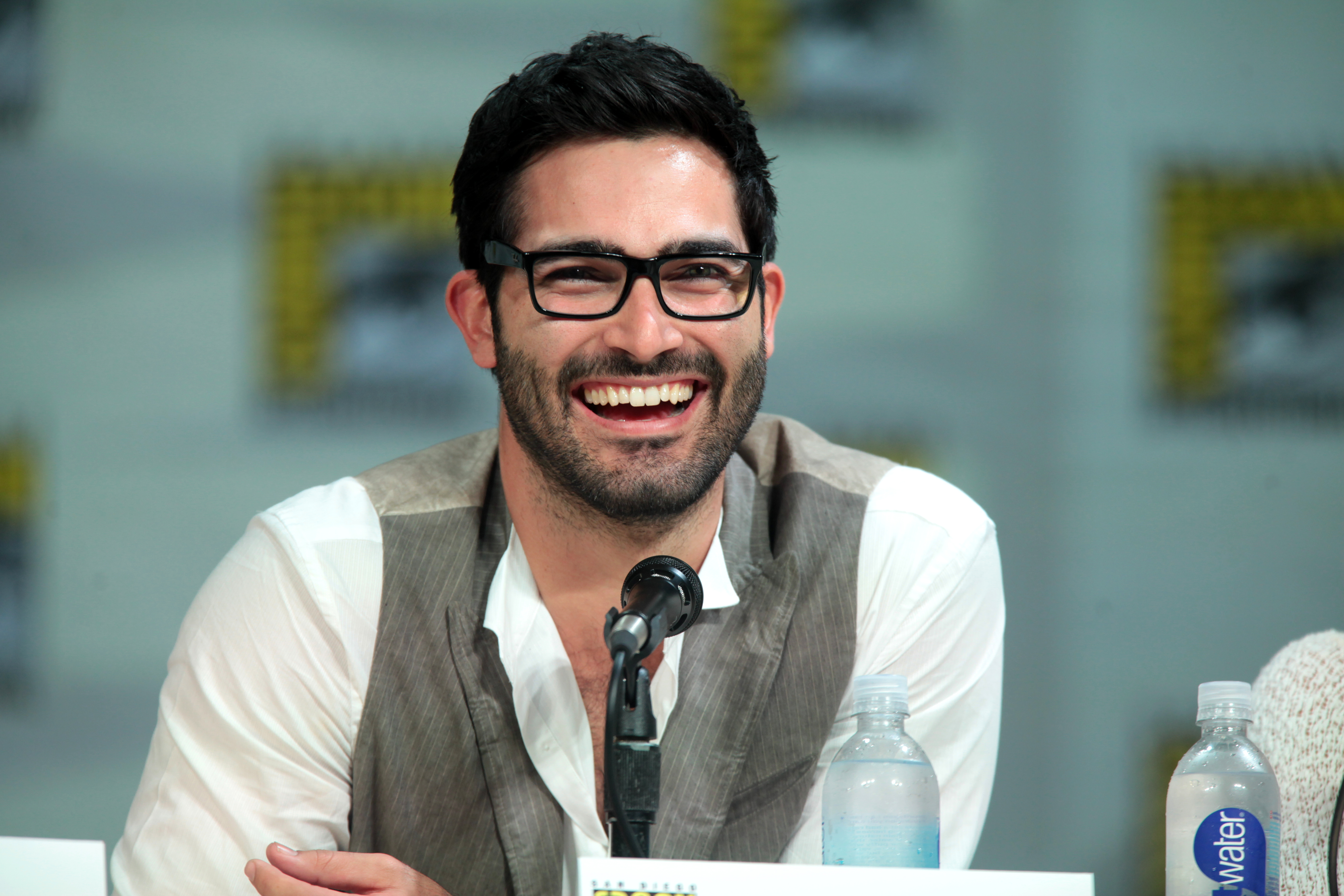
Tyler Hoechlin portrays the series' star, Clark Kent / Superman.

In October 2019, along with the series' announcement before it was officially ordered, Tyler Hoechlin and Elizabeth Tulloch were set to reprise their roles of Clark Kent and Lois Lane from Supergirl. By February of the next year, Jordan Elsass and Alex Garfin were cast as Clark and Lois' sons Jonathan Kent and Jordan Kent, respectively. In April, the role of Samuel Lane was recast to Dylan Walsh. Emmanuelle Chriqui and Erik Valdez were cast the same month as Lana Lang and Kyle Cushing, respectively. The next month, Wolé Parks was cast as "The Stranger" while Inde Navarrette was cast as Sarah Cushing. Additionally, Adam Rayner portrays Morgan Edge, who was previously portrayed by Adrian Pasdar in Supergirl.

In October 2020, Sofia Hasmik and Stacey Farber were cast in the recurring roles of Chrissy Beppo and Leslie Larr, respectively. In December 2020, David Ramsey was revealed to be reprising his Arrow role of John Diggle in addition to directing at least one episode in the series.

=== Filming ===
After COVID-19 pandemic-related delays force production to be put on hold from a late March 2020 start date, in late July 2020, Warner Bros. Television planned for the Vancouver-based production to restart in late August. Filming finally began on October 21, 2020, and is expected to conclude on June 14, 2021. The series is filmed on location in Surrey, British Columbia.

=== Design ===
Helbing stated Superman's costume in the series would feature a more "classically comicbook-y" look from the previous costume used in Supergirl. It would also somewhat reminiscent of Superman's look in DC Rebirth with the texture of the costume being inspired by the DCEU version of Superman. The new suit is designed by Laura Jean Shannon. Hoechlin further elaborated:

"Just as this suit is unique and set apart from the ones that preceded it, the story we're telling about Clark/Superman at this point in his life is unique and something we've never seen before. I appreciate the opportunity to wear the suit and the responsibility that comes with it. But it's always interesting when I'm asked how I feel about "my new suit," because I've always felt that the suit doesn't belong to me; it belongs to everyone that finds some kind of meaning in that suit, in the symbol on the chest. I just happen to be the one wearing it. I come from the world of baseball and a line of coaches that always preached that the name on the front of the jersey is more important than the one on the back. Because when you wear that jersey, it represents not only you, but your entire team, and everyone that has ever worn that jersey that came before you. So when I wear the suit, that's what it means to me. It represents everything that Superman stands for and has stood for, for almost a century now. And I look forward to carrying on that tradition."

=== Connection to the Arrowverse ===
Speaking to the lack of greater Arrowverse connections in the first season, Helbing felt there was "this weird set of circumstances where, because of production or timing or COVID, everything in the show that was related to the Arrowverse has gotten pulled out". He added that as development progressed further away from the "Crisis on Infinite Earths" crossover, "it felt like we were opening a can of worms every time we had to explain the connection", though he was hopeful more connections or proper crossovers could occur in the second season. However, ultimately, while crossovers with Supergirl and Batwoman were considered and cancelled due to the COVID-19 pandemic, it was determined towards the end of the filming of the first season to have the series be set in an alternate universe from the Arrowverse, which was confirmed by the end of the second season.

== Reception ==
=== Critical response ===
On Rotten Tomatoes, the first season has an approval rating of 86% based on 44 reviews, with an average rating of 7.6/10. The website's critical consensus reads, "Though it may be a bit too grounded for some viewers, Superman & Lois draws strength from unexpected places – without skimping on the action – to carve its own path in a crowded superhero universe." On Metacritic, it has a weighted average score of 65 out of 100 based on 16 reviews, indicating "generally favorable" reviews.

Screen Rant reviewed the premiere episode, saying "The pilot episode of Superman & Lois is filled with fan-pleasing moments, Easter eggs, callbacks to the comics, cool character moments, and exciting hints for the future. Nevertheless, while it was generally an excellent start to the series, it had some problems which will need to be addressed as the series progresses." IGN commented on the unique theme of the episode in Clark Kent and Lois Lane being parents, saying "Superman & Lois stands apart from all other versions of the Superman mythos in that it features this Dynamic Duo trying to raise twin teenage sons. The idea of Lois and Clark being parents isn't entirely new, as Jon Kent has become a mainstay of the Superman comics since 2015."

=== Ratings ===
The pilot episode's viewership of 1.75 million viewers was the highest for a premiere of any CW series since the debut of Batwoman in October 2019 with 1.86 million viewers. In addition, the premiere was streamed by 716,000 households in the United States according to Samba TV. The premiere on BBC One garnered a viewership of 2.75 million households.

Viewership and ratings per episode of Superman & Lois season 1
No.	Title	Air date	Rating (18–49)	Viewers (millions)	DVR (18–49)	DVR viewers (millions)	Total (18–49)	Total viewers (millions)
1	"Pilot"	February 23, 2021	0.4	1.75	0.4	1.40	0.8	3.15
2	"Heritage"	March 2, 2021	0.3	1.24	0.4	1.47	0.7	2.71
3	"The Perks of Not Being a Wallflower"	March 9, 2021	0.3	1.25	0.3	1.29	0.6	2.54
4	"Haywire"	March 16, 2021	0.2	1.21	—N/a	—N/a	—N/a	—N/a
5	"The Best of Smallville"	March 23, 2021	0.3	1.24	—N/a	—N/a	—N/a	—N/a
6	"Broken Trust"	May 18, 2021	0.1	0.72	0.3	1.03	0.4	1.75
7	"Man of Steel"	May 25, 2021	0.2	0.80	0.3	0.99	0.4	1.79
8	"Holding the Wrench"	June 1, 2021	0.1	0.90	0.2	0.93	0.4	1.84
9	"Loyal Subjekts"	June 8, 2021	0.2	0.92	0.2	0.88	0.4	1.80
10	"O Mother, Where Art Thou?"	June 15, 2021	0.2	0.96	0.3	0.94	0.5	1.90
11	"A Brief Reminiscence In-Between Cataclysmic Events"	June 22, 2021	0.2	0.85	0.3	0.93	0.4	1.77
12	"Through the Valley of Death"	July 13, 2021	0.2	0.87	0.2	0.84	0.4	1.71
13	"Fail Safe"	July 20, 2021	0.2	0.84	0.2	0.93	0.4	1.76
14	"The Eradicator"	August 10, 2021	0.1	0.73	0.2	0.83	0.3	1.56
15	"Last Sons of Krypton"	August 17, 2021	0.1	0.67	0.2	0.90	0.3	1.57

== Release ==
=== Broadcast ===
The pilot episode of Superman & Lois aired on The CW and CTV Sci-Fi Channel on February 23, 2021, with an encore presentation on February 27, on the cable network TNT, followed by the special, Superman & Lois: Legacy of Hope, which features behind the scenes footage, interviews with the cast, and special guests discussing the legacy of Superman. The finale aired on August 17, 2021.

In the United Kingdom, the season premiered on BBC One and BBC iPlayer on December 4, 2021.

=== Home media ===
The entire first season of Superman & Lois became available on HBO Max on September 17, 2021. It was released on Blu-ray and DVD in the US on October 19, 2021, with extended versions of all episodes.
