= Superman & Lois season 4 =

Superman & Lois
- Season 4
- Original poster
- Showrunner: Todd Helbing
- Starring: Tyler Hoechlin; Elizabeth Tulloch; Alex Garfin; Michael Bishop; Dylan Walsh; Michael Cudlitz; Inde Navarrette; Emmanuelle Chriqui; Wolé Parks; Tayler Buck; Erik Valdez; Sofia Hasmik; Chad L. Coleman
- No. of episodes: 10

Release
- Original network: The CW
- Original release: October 7 – December 2, 2024

Season chronology
- ← Previous; Season 3

The fourth and final season of the American television series Superman & Lois premiered on The CW. The series is based on the DC Comics characters Superman and Lois Lane created by Jerry Siegel and Joe Shuster. The season was produced by Berlanti Productions and Warner Bros. Television.

The series stars Tyler Hoechlin and Elizabeth Tulloch as the titular characters, Clark Kent / Superman, a costumed superhero, and his wife, Lois Lane, a reporter. Also returning are main cast members Alex Garfin, Michael Bishop, Dylan Walsh, Inde Navarrette, Emmanuelle Chriqui, Wolé Parks, Tayler Buck, Erik Valdez, Sofia Hasmik, Michael Cudlitz and Chad L. Coleman star in the season. Superman & Lois was renewed for its fourth and final season in June 2023.

The season premiered on October 7, 2024 and concluded on December 2, 2024.

== Episodes ==
No. overall	No. in season	Title	Directed by	Written by	Original release date	U.S. viewers (millions)
44	1	"The End & the Beginning"	Gregory Smith	Brent Fletcher & Todd Helbing	October 7, 2024	0.45
Lex Luthor purchases a hotel in Smallville as his new base of operations and continues to harass the Kents, angered by how he was wrongfully imprisoned due to Lois incorrectly implicating him in the murder of Boss Moxie. Jordan rescues Sam from Luthor and his subordinates Otis Grisham and Gretchen Kelley (who reveals that Gretchen is not her real name). Superman and Doomsday's battle reaches its climax when Doomsday kills Superman, delivering his heart to Luthor while presenting his corpse to the Kents. Luthor places the heart in a specialized box created by LuthorCorp worker Milton Fine. Meanwhile, Luthor and his associate Amanda McCoy track the former's estranged daughter Elizabeth. After hearing about Sam's rescue, Luthor advises Otis and "Gretchen" to lay low for awhile. Flashbacks show the early days of Lois's relationship with Clark and her original fight to have Luthor incarcerated, which he believes was an attempt to stop him from searching for kryptonite to use against Superman.
45	2	"A World Without"	Sudz Sutherland	Katie Aldrin & Kristi Korzec	October 7, 2024	0.47
As Lana Lang prevents the crowd from approaching Superman's body, Jordan takes his body to the Fortress where Lara places him in stasis. Smallville mourns Superman's death, though some residents such as Denise Olowe begin deducing his identity. Hoping to revive his father, Jordan attempts to locate Superman's heart and confronts Luthor during a meeting with LuthorCorp member Sebastien "Bash" Mallory. Luthor calls his bluff and realizes that Superman and Clark were the same man. That night, Jonathan sneaks into Luthor's hotel to try and locate the heart while Sarah tries to stall Luthor. Jordan tracks the heart to a shipping yard, but Luthor arrives, incapacitating him and destroying the heart. Luthor then calls Lois and tells her to choose which son will live, though he ultimately lets Jordan go while Lana locates and escorts Jonathan home. McCoy tells Luthor that Sam arranged for Elizabeth to go into hiding. The Kents go to the Fortress to mourn Superman's death, where Lara reveals a farewell gift from Clark: an AI hologram of himself he created in case of his demise.
46	3	"Always My Hero"	David Giuntoli	Brent Fletcher & Todd Helbing	October 14, 2024	0.43
Sam recruits John and Natalie to the DOD's Squad K and asks General Hardcastle for the serum that Bruno Mannheim used to resurrect Bizarro. Lois publishes a report about Superman's death, leading to an argument between the twins during which Jonathan's powers manifest. Lois informs Sam and Jonathan agrees to undergo training. Luthor visits Jordan and replays Lois's phone call, revealing that she chose to save Jonathan. Jordan accuses her of favoring Jonathan and wrongfully sending Luthor to prison. Luthor coerces Squad K member Jonell Jones into getting Elizabeth's location from Sam, but Sam refuses and is shot, prompting Luthor to send Doomsday. Sam injects himself with the serum while John and Natalie delay Doomsday, who ultimately snaps Sam's neck. Returning home, Natalie plays a farewell message from Sam for the Kents while John flies Sam's body to the Fortress and has Lara transfer his heart to Clark, which should revive him thanks to the serum. Later, the Kents and Irons hold a memorial service for Sam while Superman awakens. Flashbacks show Clark and Lois revealing to Sam that Clark is Superman and Sam's apprehension to give Clark his blessing to marry Lois.
47	4	"A Perfectly Good Wedding"	Gregory Smith	George Kitson & Max Kronick	October 21, 2024	0.48
Clark returns home, though he crashes while flying with Jonathan and realizes that he has less strength and stamina. Jordan overhears "Gretchen" expressing doubt over her allegiance to Luthor. Lois identifies her as Cheryl Kimble and is brought to her by Jonathan, where she implores her to turn on Luthor. Later, Jordan forgives Lois for the phone call. Meanwhile, Kyle and Chrissy plan their wedding and ask Clark and Lois to be their best man and maid of honor. Chrissy's mother arrives and worries that her daughter is only marrying Kyle because she is pregnant. After talking with Sarah and Lois, Chrissy realizes that she does not know much about Kyle, though she does still love him. At the ceremony, Jonathan leaves to stop a fire in Metropolis and finds Cheryl being attacked by Hacksaw Kronick, a henchman of Luthor's. Superman rescues them and arranges for John to place Kronick in DOD custody, though Cheryl flees. Back home, Kyle and Chrissy decide to postpone their marriage and Jordan, wanting to step back from superheroics, gives Jonathan his suit. Later that night, media outlets begin reporting on Superman's return.
48	5	"Break the Cycle"	Elizabeth Henstridge	Adam Mallinger	October 28, 2024	0.43
Upon returning to Smallville, Luthor is intercepted by Superman, who advises him to let go of his anger. With Superman unable to defeat Doomsday, Lois locates Elizabeth in France. Hoping she can dissuade Luthor, Jonathan flies Lois there, leaving Jordan to stall Candice. Elizabeth reluctantly meets Luthor in Smallville and reveals that she is six months pregnant. After speaking with Clark, Elizabeth agrees to accept Luthor back into her life provided he leaves the Kents alone. Luthor refuses and Elizabeth leaves, unwilling to expose her son to Luthor's hatred. Meanwhile, Candice sees through the twins' lies about Jonathan's whereabouts and threatens to leave when he refuses to tell her the truth. Jordan ultimately tells her, and she and Jonathan reconcile. Clark prepares to evacuate the Kents to the Fortress, but Lois reveals that she found the device used to summon Doomsday and convinced him to remember his family from the Inverse World. Back in Metropolis, McCoy reveals to Luthor that Doomsday has disappeared. Flashbacks show Luthor and his ex-wife Erica getting a divorce, his efforts to convince Elizabeth to stay with him, and Superman arresting him after he drops Elizabeth off at school.
49	6	"When the Lights Come On"	Ian Samoil	Teleplay by : Kristi Korzec; Story by : Brent Fletcher & Todd Helbing	November 4, 2024	0.51
Luthor plans to purchase land from Aidy Manning and threatens Lana into allowing him to build a new headquarters in Smallville. Lana and Clark convince Aidy to stop the sale, but worry that she only agreed because she knows Clark's secret identity. At a local bar, Luthor offers Aidy and the other patrons $10 million each, but they refuse. Meanwhile, Jonathan begins overworking himself. Lois attempts to flip McCoy, revealing that Luthor cut ties with Elizabeth. Coach Gaines, aware of the twins' powers, attempts to recruit them for the football season. Jordan asks to work at the diner, puzzling Sarah, who envies his freedom to go anywhere. That night, Otis breaks into Lana's house and tries to strangle her, but is repelled by Sarah and taken to the DOD. After the attack, both twins understand what they did wrong, with Jordan back as a hero. Enraged, Clark confronts Luthor outside the hotel, but is depowered by red streetlights installed by Milton. With his family watching, Clark defeats Luthor in a fistfight and warns him to never return to Smallville. Sarah decides to study abroad, which Lana allows. Back in Metropolis, McCoy reaffirms her loyalty to Luthor and says that he needs a "killer suit".
50	7	"A Regular Guy"	Gregory Smith	Katie Aldrin & George Kitson	November 11, 2024	0.44
Clark tries to prove to Smallville residents like Denise and Gaines that he is not Superman. Timmy Ryan confronts the twins over their powers, angered by how he couldn't compete with them on the football team. Clark and the twins then lie to Timmy's mother about their powers despite Timmy's insistence. Meanwhile, in order to afford a house, Chrissy considers selling her share of the Gazette. While having dinner with her, Kyle, and Clark, Lois decides to use her inheritance to buy Chrissy's share so they can continue working together. Candice's father Emmet enters and shoots Clark, wanting to expose his identity. After Kyle has Emmet arrested, the Kents learn that he learned Clark's identity from Luthor, not Candice. Realizing how much harm their secret is causing, the Kents decide to stop hiding it. The next morning, Janet Olsen of the Daily Planet interviews Clark and he publicly reveals his identity. No longer needing his glasses in public, he reconciles with Jimmy Olsen at the diner. Flashbacks show Clark joining the Daily Planet's softball team. Jimmy suspects Clark's true identity when his absences coincide with Superman's appearances, forcing Clark to distance himself in order to protect his secret.
51	8	"Sharp Dressed Man"	Michael Cudlitz	Brent Fletcher & Todd Helbing	November 18, 2024	0.35
Lois learns that she is cancer-free while John and Natalie unknowingly rescue Milton from a staged car crash. LuthorCorp has Gordon Godfrey interview Luthor, who challenges Lois to a debate. John learns that Otis was found dead in his cell before he could testify against Luthor. He also runs tests on Clark and concludes that his powers are slowly fading. Meanwhile, Natalie struggles with her work-life balance. Candice breaks up with Jonathan, upset that people are stalking her because of his popularity. Jordan and Natalie convince him to meet her in-person, and they reconcile. At the interview, Luthor displays footage of Clark fighting him and Jonathan infiltrating his hotel. As Lois tries to call Elizabeth, Milton hacks John's and Natalie's suits and has them attack the Kents with John trapped inside the former. Superman breaks through the window to rescue John and incapacitate his suit while the twins destroy Natalie's. Later that night, Godfrey exposes Lois as Superman's wife and vilifies her. Luthor and McCoy share a kiss. Clark and Lois tell the twins about Clark's condition. Milton recovers John's suit and alters it for Luthor's use.
52	9	"To Live and Die Again"	Jai Jamison	Jai Jamison	November 25, 2024	0.50
Luthor exposes Clark's condition on the GODFREY! website. McCoy sues Lois for defamation and hints toward Cheryl's death. Lois visits Bruno Mannheim in prison, and he is surprised by Cheryl's death because she and Luthor were once in love. Realizing that a similar situation is playing out with McCoy, Lois warns her that Luthor will still turn against her. At the Fortress, Clark dismisses the twins from training when they don't show substantial progress. Lara tells him that the twins can't match his strength as half-Kryptonians, but Lois tells him to focus on what the twins can do, not what they can't do. He brings them out to train again and tells them to work together. Milton locates Doomsday in the mines and Luthor returns to Smallville, planning to unleash Doomsday on the town. McCoy questions this, but Luthor reaffirms his decision and she leaves. Using John's suit, he kills and revives Doomsday and sends him to attack Smallville. Despite Lois’s attempts to reason with Doomsday, Superman is forced to hold him off while the twins rescue the citizens. Nearly defeated, Superman tells his family that he loves them before being pulled away by Doomsday.
53	10	"It Went by So Fast"	Gregory Smith	Brent Fletcher & Todd Helbing	December 2, 2024	0.51
Lois convinces Superman to let the twins help while Lana and an injured John assist the family in knocking Doomsday out with John's hammer. As Superman flies Doomsday to the sun to weaken him, he awakens and sacrifices himself. Luthor attacks McCoy, shutting down a broadcast intended to expose him and incapacitating the twins in the process. John and the DOD arrest Milton while Superman rescues Jordan, who revives Jonathan. In a fight, Superman destroys Lex's suit and defeats him on camera. One year later, Lois officiates John and Lana's wedding. Chrissy and Kyle are raising their son and are expecting another while Sarah has been studying abroad in Greece. Luthor is put away for life in Stryker's Prison where Mannheim gloats. Throughout the following 32 years, Superman continues protecting the world with the twins and Irons. Clark and Lois work with charities and bring attention to various world issues. The twins grow up, get married, and have children. Lois' cancer returns and she dies. Afterwards, Clark adopts a golden retriever and names him Krypto. Years later, Clark dies from heart failure. He says goodbye to his sons and close friends before reuniting with Lois in the afterlife.

== Cast and characters ==
=== Main ===
- Tyler Hoechlin as Kal-El / Clark Kent / Superman (Note: This actor also appears as their character's Bizarro counterpart in archive footage.)
- Elizabeth Tulloch as Lois Lane
- Alex Garfin as Jordan Kent
- Michael Bishop as Jonathan Kent (Note: Jordan Elsass appears as Jonathan Kent via archive footage from the first season.)
- Erik Valdez as Kyle Cushing (Note: This actor is only credited for their respective episode appearances.)
- Inde Navarrette as Sarah Cortez
- Wolé Parks as John Henry Irons
- Tayler Buck as Natalie Lane Irons / Starlight
- Sofia Hasmik as Chrissy Beppo
- Chad L. Coleman as Bruno Mannheim
- Dylan Walsh as Samuel Lane
- Emmanuelle Chriqui as Lana Lang
- Michael Cudlitz as Lex Luthor (Note: Cudlitz is listed among the main cast but receives "special appearance by" credit in the opening titles.)

=== Recurring ===
- Mariana Klaveno as Lara Lor-Van
- Yvonne Chapman as Amanda McCoy
- Paul Lazenby as Doomsday

=== Guest ===
- Ryan Jefferson Booth as Otis Grisham
- Rebecca Staab as "Gretchen Kelley" / Cheryl Kimble
- Elizabeth Henstridge as Elizabeth Luthor
- Michele Scarabelli as Martha Kent
- Laara Sadiq as Mrs. Beppo
- Natalie Moon as Erica Luthor
- Samantha Di Francesco as Candice Pergande
- Adrian Glynn McMorran as Emmitt Pergande
- Douglas Smith as Jimmy Olsen
- Tom Cavanagh as Gordon Godfrey
- Nikolai Witschl as Milton Fine
- Dean Redman as William Ellis

== Production ==
=== Development ===
In June 2023, The CW renewed the series for a fourth season with a shortened 10 episode order. That November, season four was confirmed to be the final season. The special effects for the season were planned to be completed by mid-2024.

=== Casting ===
Main cast members Tyler Hoechlin, Elizabeth Tulloch, Alex Garfin, and Michael Bishop return as Kal-El / Clark Kent / Superman, Lois Lane, Jordan Kent, and Jonathan Kent. Michael Cudlitz joins as a main cast member following his guest appearances as Lex Luthor in the previous season, receiving "special appearance by" credit.

Shortly after the announcement of the fourth season, the supporting cast members were let go due to budget cuts but were given the option to guest star in the future. Walsh originally indicated that he would not be returning in any capacity, but the Be More Super podcast later reported in December 2023 that he would return for two episodes, while Chriqui also indicated that she would return in some capacity. Navarrette confirmed in July that she would return for at least three episodes. Ultimately, each member of the supporting cast that appeared in the previous season reprised their role and retained main cast billing for the episodes that they appeared in. Tom Cavanagh, who initially portrayed Eobard Thawne and various versions of Harrison Wells throughout The Flash, guest starred in one episode as Gordon Godfrey.

=== Filming ===
Filming for the season began on January 11, 2024 in Metro Vancouver, British Columbia, Canada. Filming concluded on April 24, 2024. The cast and crew held a wrap party on April 25, 2024, to celebrate the conclusion of four seasons of filming.

== Release ==
The season premiered on The CW on October 7, 2024. It was released on the Max streaming service on January 1, 2025, and on DVD and Blu-ray on April 1, 2025.

== Ratings ==
Viewership and ratings per episode of Superman & Lois season 4
No.	Title	Air date	Rating (18–49)	Viewers (millions)	DVR (18–49)	DVR viewers (millions)	Total (18–49)	Total viewers (millions)
1	"The End & The Beginning"	October 7, 2024	0.1	0.45	—N/a	—N/a	—N/a	—N/a
2	"A World Without"	October 7, 2024	0.1	0.47	—N/a	—N/a	—N/a	—N/a
3	"Always My Hero"	October 14, 2024	0.1	0.43	0.1	0.27	0.1	0.70
4	"A Perfectly Good Wedding"	October 21, 2024	0.1	0.48	0.0	0.30	0.1	0.78
5	"Break the Cycle"	October 28, 2024	0.0	0.43	0.1	0.30	0.1	0.73
6	"When the Lights Come On"	November 4, 2024	0.1	0.51	0.1	0.35	0.2	0.86
7	"A Regular Guy"	November 11, 2024	0.1	0.44	0.1	0.32	0.2	0.76
8	"Sharp Dressed Man"	November 18, 2024	0.1	0.35	0.1	0.31	0.1	0.67
9	"To Live and Die Again"	November 25, 2024	0.1	0.50	0.1	0.27	0.1	0.77
10	"It Went By So Fast"	December 2, 2024	0.1	0.51	0.0	0.28	0.1	0.79
