= Superman & Lois =

2021 American superhero drama television series

- Genre: Action-adventure; Drama; Superhero
- Based on: Characters appearing in DC Comics
- Developed by: Greg Berlanti; Todd Helbing
- Showrunner: Todd Helbing
- Starring: Tyler Hoechlin; Elizabeth Tulloch; Jordan Elsass; Alex Garfin; Erik Valdez; Inde Navarrette; Wolé Parks; Adam Rayner; Dylan Walsh; Emmanuelle Chriqui; Tayler Buck; Sofia Hasmik; Michael Bishop; Chad L. Coleman; Michael Cudlitz
- Music by: Dan Romer
- Country of origin: United States
- Original language: English
- No. of seasons: 4
- No. of episodes: 53

Production
- Executive producers: David Madden; Geoff Johns; Kristi Korzec; Sarah Schechter; Lee Toland Krieger; Todd Helbing; Greg Berlanti; Brent Fletcher; Gregory Smith
- Producers: Karyn Smith-Forge; Carl Ogawa; Jennifer Lence; Nadria Tucker; Louis Shaw Milito; Stephen Judge; Ian Samoil
- Production locations: Vancouver, British Columbia
- Cinematography: Gavin Struthers; Stephen Maier; Gordon Verheul; Mark Cohen
- Editors: Harry Jierjian; David Holland; Becca Berry; Brian G. Addie; Ray McCoy; Isabel Yanes
- Camera setup: Single-camera
- Running time: 40–45 minutes; 63 minutes (pilot)
- Production companies: Berlanti Productions; DC Entertainment; Warner Bros. Television

Original release
- Network: The CW
- Release: February 23, 2021 – December 2, 2024

Superman & Lois is an American superhero drama television series developed for The CW by Todd Helbing and Greg Berlanti, based on the DC Comics characters Superman and Lois Lane, created by Jerry Siegel and Joe Shuster. Tyler Hoechlin and Elizabeth Tulloch star as the title characters Clark Kent / Superman and Lois Lane, respectively. Jordan Elsass and Alex Garfin portray the couple's twin sons Jonathan and Jordan Kent, with Michael Bishop replacing the former in the third season. The series also stars Erik Valdez, Inde Navarrette, Wolé Parks, Adam Rayner, Dylan Walsh, Emmanuelle Chriqui, Tayler Buck, Sofia Hasmik, Chad L. Coleman, and Michael Cudlitz.

The series was originally part of the Arrowverse's Earth-Prime in its first season, developed as a spin-off of Supergirl. Hoechlin and Tulloch respectively reprise their roles from Supergirl and The Flash, and the conclusion of the "Crisis on Infinite Earths" crossover event initially served as a backdoor pilot. As the series went on, following the cancellation of planned crossovers with Supergirl and Batwoman due to the COVID-19 pandemic, showrunner Todd Helbing and Warner Bros. decided to have the show set in its own continuity, taking place on a different Earth to Earth-Prime, which was confirmed in the second season finale.

Superman & Lois was announced as a pilot in October 2019 and was ordered to series in January 2020. The series aired on The CW for four seasons, from February 23, 2021 to December 2, 2024.

== Premise ==
In the first season, Clark Kent / Superman and Lois Lane return to Smallville with their sons Jonathan and Jordan, where they are reacquainted with Lana Lang, her husband Kyle Cushing, and their daughter Sarah. Their idyllic lives are upended by the Stranger's entrance, as well as by the secret experiments of Morgan Edge.

In the second season, Superman's painful visions lead him to an encounter with Bizarro while also butting heads with Lt. General Mitch Anderson. Meanwhile, Lois deals with the Inverse Method cult led by Ally Allston, who swayed Lucy Lane to her side and has made an enemy of Bizarro for her supposed conquering of his world.

In the third season, Superman contends with the plots of Intergang, as Lois suffers from stage three inflammatory breast cancer. Following the death of Peia Mannheim and the surrender of Bruno Mannheim, Lex Luthor is released from prison when the Mannheims' frame-up of him killing Boss Moxie is exposed. He proceeds to plan his revenge on Superman and Lois that involves a resurrected Bizarro.

In the fourth and final season, Superman continues his fight with the mutated Bizarro, now known as Doomsday, as Luthor begins his next plot that involves setting up a new base where the Manning Farm is. Things go worse for the Kent family when Doomsday gives Superman's heart to Luthor as he ordered.

== Cast and characters ==
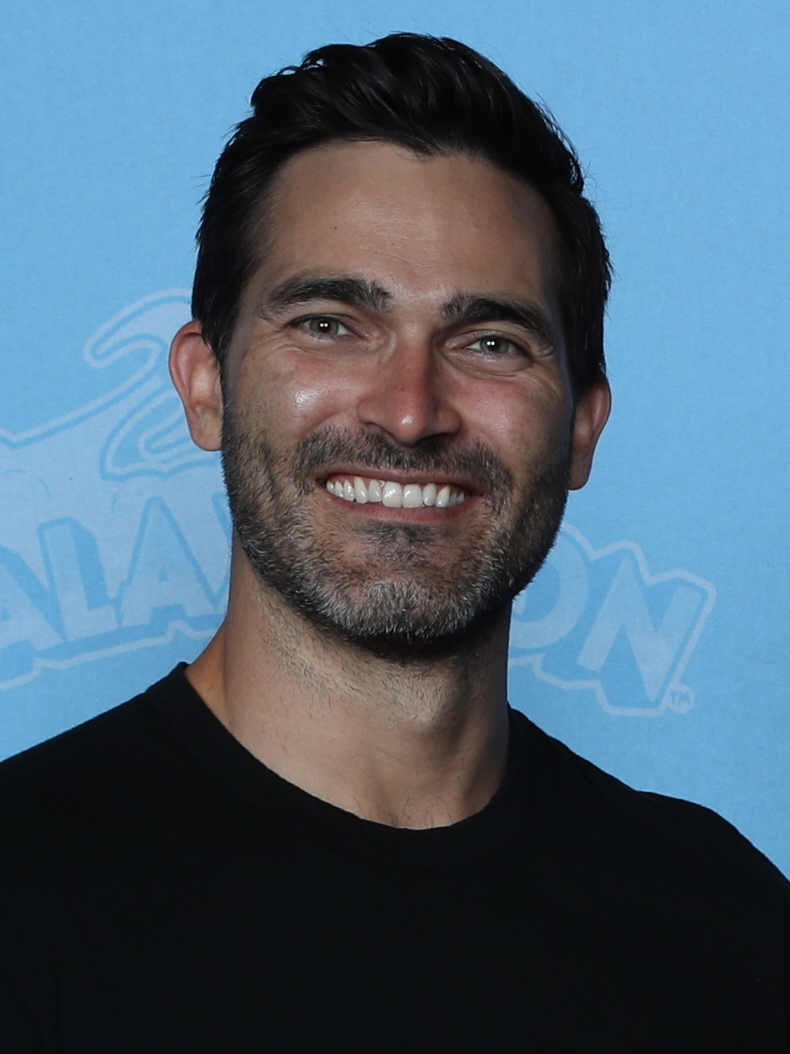
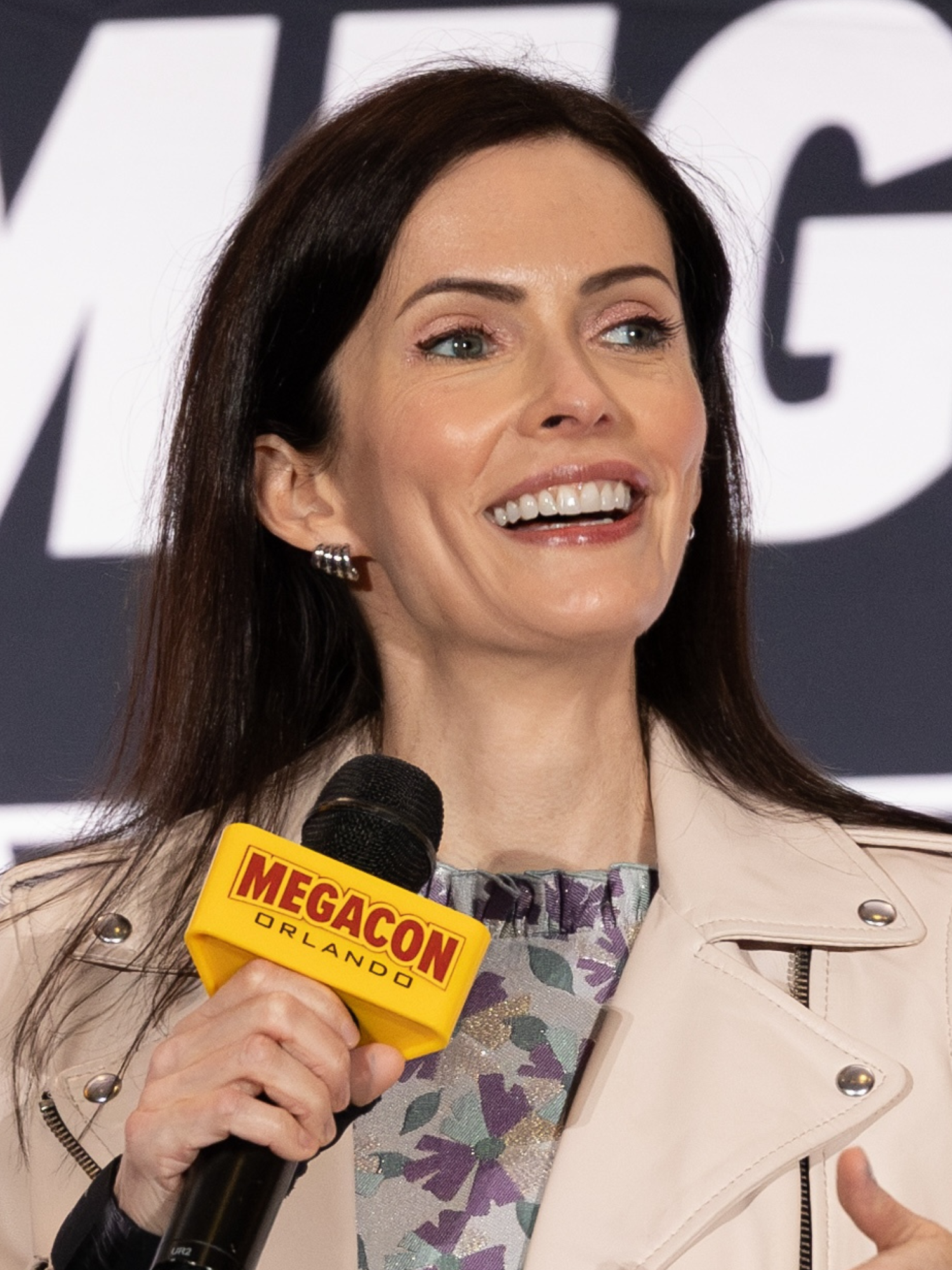
Tyler Hoechlin and Elizabeth Tulloch
- Tyler Hoechlin as Clark Kent / Superman:
  A superhero from Krypton, and husband of Lois, who defends Earth. Dylan Kingwell portrays a teenage Clark in season one, Josh Zaharia portrays a teenage Clark in season two, Lennix James portrays a four-year-old Clark, Thomas Hoeving portrays Clark in his childhood, and Parker Cousineau portrays Clark in grade school. In an interview with Michael Rosenbaum on Inside of You following the series' finale, Hoechlin admitted that he accepted the part of Superman without fully understanding the character and that he had grown up being more of a fan of Batman and Indiana Jones.
- Elizabeth Tulloch as Lois Lane: A journalist and wife of Clark.
- Jordan Elsass (seasons 1–2) and Michael Bishop (seasons 3–4) as Jonathan Kent:
  The modest, kind-hearted and athletic son of Clark and Lois who, unlike Jordan, initially did not inherit any Kryptonian superpowers, though they manifest after an emotional outburst in season 4. He is named after Clark's adoptive father, Jonathan Kent. Elsass departed the series prior to the third season due to personal issues, and the role was recast to Bishop. Brady Droulis portrays a seven-year-old Jonathan Kent.
- Alex Garfin as Jordan Kent:
  The introspective son of Clark and Lois, who is an outcast with social anxiety. Unlike Jonathan for the first 3 seasons, Jordan has inherited their father's powers, though early in season 1 his abilities only appear in "small bursts" but he manifests more powers and in season 2 he has grown powerful enough to fight Tal-Rho for a brief time. He is named after Clark's biological father, Jor-El. Dawson Littman portrays a seven-year-old Jordan Kent.
- Erik Valdez as Kyle Cushing (né Cortez):
  Ex-husband of Lana Lang and Smallville's fire chief. Callous, abrasive, and a former alcoholic. A man always looking to do the right thing for the people he cares for. However, Cushing carries a chip on his shoulder about living in a small town.
- Inde Navarrette as Sarah Cortez:
  Kyle and Lana's "wild child" daughter who befriends the Kent boys and serves as Jordan's love interest. In the season 2 episode "Girl... You'll Be A Woman, Soon" she celebrates her quinceañera and changes her name to Cortez, which was her family's name before they changed it.
- Wolé Parks as John Henry Irons:
  A soldier and talented engineer from an unidentified parallel Earth who is hellbent on proving to the world that it no longer needs Superman. He eventually accepts Superman as the savior of Earth and teams up with him to protect people from Morgan Edge.
- Adam Rayner as Tal-Rho / Morgan Edge / Eradicator (season 1; special guest season 2):
  An "intelligent, eloquent, and impassioned self-made mogul whose innate ability to motivate is the means to his success and others' demise." He is later revealed to be Kal-El's half-brother known as Tal-Rho through Kal's mother Lara Lor-Van and Zeta-Rho with plans to restore the Kryptonian race. Jack Rehbein and Ben Cockell portray a 10-year-old Tal-Rho and a 19-year-old Tal-Rho, respectively.
- Dylan Walsh as Sam Lane: Father of Lois and grandfather of Jonathan and Jordan, a no-nonsense, workaholic army general who is determined to keep America and the world safe from all threats.
- Emmanuelle Chriqui as Lana Lang:
  An old friend of Clark Kent and the former loan officer at Smallville Bank. In season two, she becomes the new mayor of Smallville. Milano Hryshchenko portrays a childhood Lana, Sara Rizk portrays a grade school Lana, and Emma Newton portrays a teenage Lana.
- Tayler Buck as Natalie Lane Irons / Starlight (seasons 2–4; guest season 1): John Henry Irons's daughter from his Earth with an alternate version of Lois Lane.
- Sofia Hasmik as Chrissy Beppo (seasons 2–4; recurring season 1): A "go-getter" journalist at the Smallville Gazette who has a "chance encounter" that changes her life.
- Chad L. Coleman as Bruno Mannheim (seasons 3–4): The leader of Intergang, the widower of the late Peia Mannheim and the father of Matteo Mannheim.
- Michael Cudlitz as Lex Luthor (season 4 (Note: Cudlitz is listed among the main cast but receives "special appearance by" credit in the opening titles.); guest season 3): A business mogul who seeks revenge on Lois Lane and her family.

== Episodes ==
Season	Episodes	Originally released		Rank	Average viewers (in millions)
Season	Episodes	First released	Last released	Rank	Average viewers (in millions)
1	15	February 23, 2021	August 17, 2021	116	2.44
2	15	January 11, 2022	June 28, 2022	115	1.60
3	13	March 14, 2023	June 27, 2023	110	1.15
4	10	October 7, 2024	December 2, 2024	TBA	TBA

=== Season 1 (2021) ===
No. overall	No. in season	Title	Directed by	Written by	Original release date	U.S. viewers (millions)
1	1	"Pilot"	Lee Toland Krieger	Teleplay by : Todd Helbing; Story by : Greg Berlanti & Todd Helbing	February 23, 2021	1.75
2	2	"Heritage"	Lee Toland Krieger	Todd Helbing	March 2, 2021	1.24
3	3	"The Perks of Not Being a Wallflower"	Gregory Smith	Brent Fletcher	March 9, 2021	1.25
4	4	"Haywire"	James Bamford	Michael Narducci	March 16, 2021	1.21
5	5	"The Best of Smallville"	Rachel Talalay	Teleplay by : Brent Fletcher and Nadria Tucker; Story by : Todd Helbing	March 23, 2021	1.24
6	6	"Broken Trust"	Sudz Sutherland	Katie Aldrin	May 18, 2021	0.72
7	7	"Man of Steel"	David Ramsey	Jai Jamison	May 25, 2021	0.80
8	8	"Holding the Wrench"	Norma Bailey	Kristi Korzec	June 1, 2021	0.90
9	9	"Loyal Subjekts"	Eric Dean Seaton	Andrew N. Wong	June 8, 2021	0.92
10	10	"O Mother, Where Art Thou?"	Harry Jierjian	Adam Mallinger	June 15, 2021	0.96
11	11	"A Brief Reminiscence In-Between Cataclysmic Events"	Gregory Smith	Brent Fletcher	June 22, 2021	0.85
12	12	"Through the Valley of Death"	Alexandra La Roche	Katie Aldrin & Michael Narducci	July 13, 2021	0.87
13	13	"Fail Safe"	Ian Samoil	Jai Jamison & Kristi Korzec	July 20, 2021	0.84
14	14	"The Eradicator"	Alexandra La Roche	Max Cunningham & Brent Fletcher	August 10, 2021	0.73
15	15	"Last Sons of Krypton"	Tom Cavanagh	Story by : Kristi Korzec & Michael Narducci; Teleplay by : Brent Fletcher & Todd Helbing	August 17, 2021	0.67

=== Season 2 (2022) ===
No. overall	No. in season	Title	Directed by	Written by	Original release date	U.S. viewers (millions)
16	1	"What Lies Beneath"	Gregory Smith	Brent Fletcher & Todd Helbing	January 11, 2022	1.09
17	2	"The Ties That Bind"	David Ramsey	Kristi Korzec & Michael Narducci	January 18, 2022	1.10
18	3	"The Thing in the Mines"	Gregory Smith	Katie Aldrin & Juliana James	January 25, 2022	0.90
19	4	"The Inverse Method"	Melissa Hickey	Jai Jamison & Andrew N. Wong	February 1, 2022	0.78
20	5	"Girl... You'll Be A Woman, Soon"	Diana Valentine	Rina Mimoun & Adam Mallinger	February 22, 2022	0.79
21	6	"Tried and True"	Amy Jo Johnson	Max Kronick & Patrick Barton Leahy	March 1, 2022	0.76
22	7	"Anti-Hero"	Elizabeth Henstridge	Max Cunningham & Michael Narducci	March 8, 2022	0.77
23	8	"Into Oblivion"	Sudz Sutherland; Gregory Smith	Juliana James & Kristi Korzec	March 22, 2022	0.80
24	9	"30 Days and 30 Nights"	Ian Samoil	Katie Aldrin & Jai Jamison	March 29, 2022	0.68
25	10	"Bizarros in a Bizarro World"	Louis Shaw Milito	Brent Fletcher & Todd Helbing	April 26, 2022	0.83
26	11	"Truth and Consequences"	David Ramsey	Andrew N. Wong	May 3, 2022	0.73
27	12	"Lies That Bind"	David Mahmoudieh	Rina Mimoun	May 31, 2022	0.71
28	13	"All Is Lost"	Elaine Mongeon	Kristi Korzec	June 7, 2022	0.71
29	14	"Worlds War Bizarre"	Sheelin Choksey	Michael Narducci	June 21, 2022	0.80
30	15	"Waiting for Superman"	Gregory Smith	Brent Fletcher & Todd Helbing	June 28, 2022	0.82

=== Season 3 (2023) ===
No. overall	No. in season	Title	Directed by	Written by	Original release date	U.S. viewers (millions)
31	1	"Closer"	Tom Cavanagh	Brent Fletcher & Todd Helbing	March 14, 2023	0.75
32	2	"Uncontrollable Forces"	Elizabeth Henstridge	Katie Aldrin	March 21, 2023	0.66
33	3	"In Cold Blood"	Gregory Smith	Jai Jamison	March 28, 2023	0.64
34	4	"Too Close to Home"	Stewart Hendler	Juliana James	April 4, 2023	0.70
35	5	"Head On"	David Ramsey	Andrew N. Wong	April 11, 2023	0.65
36	6	"Of Sound Mind"	Diana Valentine	George Kitson	April 25, 2023	0.61
37	7	"Forever and Always"	Alvaro Ron	Adam Mallinger	May 2, 2023	0.66
38	8	"Guess Who's Coming to Dinner"	Gregory Smith	Aaron Helbing	May 9, 2023	0.55
39	9	"The Dress"	Stephen Maier	Kristi Korzec	May 23, 2023	0.60
40	10	"Collision Course"	Elaine Mongeon	Max Cunningham & Max Kronick	May 30, 2023	0.66
41	11	"Complications"	Jai Jamison	Teleplay by : Katie Aldrin & George Kitson; Story by : Brent Fletcher & Todd Helbing	June 6, 2023	0.66
42	12	"Injustice"	Sudz Sutherland	Michael Narducci	June 20, 2023	0.66
43	13	"What Kills You Only Makes You Stronger"	Gregory Smith	Brent Fletcher & Todd Helbing	June 27, 2023	0.73

=== Season 4 (2024) ===
No. overall	No. in season	Title	Directed by	Written by	Original release date	U.S. viewers (millions)
44	1	"The End & the Beginning"	Gregory Smith	Brent Fletcher & Todd Helbing	October 7, 2024	0.45
45	2	"A World Without"	Sudz Sutherland	Katie Aldrin & Kristi Korzec	October 7, 2024	0.47
46	3	"Always My Hero"	David Giuntoli	Brent Fletcher & Todd Helbing	October 14, 2024	0.43
47	4	"A Perfectly Good Wedding"	Gregory Smith	George Kitson & Max Kronick	October 21, 2024	0.48
48	5	"Break the Cycle"	Elizabeth Henstridge	Adam Mallinger	October 28, 2024	0.43
49	6	"When the Lights Come On"	Ian Samoil	Teleplay by : Kristi Korzec; Story by : Brent Fletcher & Todd Helbing	November 4, 2024	0.51
50	7	"A Regular Guy"	Gregory Smith	Katie Aldrin & George Kitson	November 11, 2024	0.44
51	8	"Sharp Dressed Man"	Michael Cudlitz	Brent Fletcher & Todd Helbing	November 18, 2024	0.35
52	9	"To Live and Die Again"	Jai Jamison	Jai Jamison	November 25, 2024	0.50
53	10	"It Went by So Fast"	Gregory Smith	Brent Fletcher & Todd Helbing	December 2, 2024	0.51

== Production ==
=== Development ===
The series was announced in October 2019 with Todd Helbing, Greg Berlanti, Sarah Schechter and Geoff Johns executive producing, and Helbing penning the script. On January 14, 2020, The CW officially ordered Superman & Lois to series. The first season consisted of 15 episodes. The series Everwood and Friday Night Lights served as inspirations for the show, given they were also family dramas. Helbing explained many aspects of Superman & Lois were approached as if it were a feature film, such as the aspect ratio, cinematography, and production design, saying "We are competing with shows on cable and streamers...we wanted to be able to do that and offer audiences something of equal quality". In March 2021, The CW renewed the series for a second season. In March 2022, The CW renewed the series for a third season.

In January 2023, DC Studios CEOs James Gunn and Peter Safran said they expected the show to continue for "one to two more seasons". Brad Schwartz, President of Entertainment at The CW, stated in May 2023 that the business model of the show was no longer feasible for the network due to the show being expensive to produce, adding that it did not directly generate any profits and The CW did not have the rights to previous seasons. On June 12, 2023, The CW renewed the series for a fourth season consisting of ten episodes which was announced to be the last one on November 2, 2023. Under the renewal agreement, the series had the number of its regular cast members and writers as well as action scenes reduced while gearing more towards a family-focused drama in an effort to reduce production costs. Production was however delayed due to the 2023 Writers Guild of America and SAG-AFTRA strikes, with the season being scheduled for a 2024 fall-premiere. Schwartz stated in an interview that the decision to end the series was made by Warner Bros. Discovery to avoid competition with the upcoming DC Universe (DCU) film Superman (2025).

=== Casting ===
Tyler Hoechlin and Elizabeth Tulloch were signed on to reprise their roles as Clark Kent and Lois Lane from Supergirl. In February 2020, Jordan Elsass and Alex Garfin were cast as Clark and Lois' sons Jonathan Kent and Jordan Kent, respectively. In April, Dylan Walsh was cast as Samuel Lane. Walsh replaces Glenn Morshower, who previously recurred in the role on Supergirl. Emmanuelle Chriqui was also cast as Lana Lang, along with Erik Valdez as Kyle Cushing. The next month, Wolé Parks was cast as "The Stranger" while Inde Navarrette was cast as Sarah Cushing. Additionally, Adam Rayner portrays Morgan Edge, who was previously portrayed by Adrian Pasdar in Supergirl.

In October 2020, Sofia Hasmik and Stacey Farber were cast in the recurring roles of Chrissy Beppo and Leslie Larr, respectively. In December 2020, David Ramsey was revealed to be reprising his Arrow role of John Diggle in addition to directing at least one episode in the series. In June 2021, Hasmik was promoted to a series regular for the second season. In August 2021, Tayler Buck, who guest starred in the first season, was promoted to a series regular for the second season. In October 2021, Ian Bohen was cast in a recurring role as Lt. Mitch Anderson for the second season. Jenna Dewan, who previously played Lucy Lane on Supergirl reprised her role in the second season.

In August 2022, Elsass departed the series ahead of the third season for personal reasons. The following month, his role was recast to Michael Bishop and Chad L. Coleman was cast as Bruno Mannheim. Lex Luthor appears in the show where he is now portrayed by Michael Cudlitz instead of a reprisal from Jon Cryer, who played his doppelgänger on Earth-Prime.

Seven of the twelve cast members were cut as series regulars following the renewal of the show for the fourth and final season. These included Dylan Walsh, Emmanuelle Chriqui, Erik Valdez, Inde Navarrette, Wolé Parks, Tayler Buck and Sofia Hasmik. Michael Cudlitz joins as a main cast member following his guest appearances in the previous season, receiving "special appearance by" credit. Navarrette confirmed in July 2023 that she would return as a guest star for at least three episodes. Ultimately, each member of the supporting cast that appeared in the previous season reprised their role and retained main cast billing for the episodes that they appeared in.

=== Filming ===
Production on the pilot was expected to begin on March 23, 2020, in Vancouver, British Columbia, and conclude on May 14. However, on March 13, 2020, plans to shoot a pilot were delayed due to the COVID-19 pandemic, to either June or July of that year. In late July 2020, Warner Bros. Television planned for the Vancouver-based production to restart in late August. Filming of season 1 began on October 21, 2020, and concluded on July 2, 2021. The series is filmed on location in Surrey, British Columbia. The second season began filming on September 15, 2021, and concluded on May 5, 2022. Filming of the third season began on September 6, 2022 in Vancouver, and concluded on March 14, 2023. Filming for the fourth season began on January 11, 2024 and concluded on April 24, 2024 with Hoechlin receiving a supportive letter from upcoming Superman actor David Corenswet as production wrapped up. The cast and crew held a wrap party on April 25, 2024 to celebrate the conclusion of four seasons of filming.

=== Writing ===
In November 2020, series writer Nadria Tucker announced she was fired from the show, claiming it was for "pushing back on racist and sexist storylines." She also claimed she worked on all 15 episodes of the first season, but was only paid for 13 of them. In a statement, WBTV claimed that "Warner Bros. Television did not exercise its option to extend her [contract] for additional episodes" and that "WBTV was transparent and told her why it was not picking up her option."

== Connection to the Arrowverse ==
Speaking of the lack of greater Arrowverse connections in the first season, showrunner Todd Helbing felt that there was "this weird set of circumstances where, because of production or timing or COVID, everything in the show that was related to the Arrowverse has gotten pulled out". He added that, as development progressed further away from the "Crisis on Infinite Earths" crossover, "it felt like we were opening a can of worms every time we had to explain the connection", though he was hopeful more connections or proper crossovers could occur in the second season.

Though the multiverse, Oliver Queen and the Arrowverse's version of the League (Note: Informally established at the end of the "Crisis on Infinite Earths" crossover, although the term "Justice League" has never been mentioned in-universe.) were mentioned in the first season, the second season finale establishes that the series takes place adjacent to Earth-Prime, with different iterations of the characters compared to their Earth-Prime counterparts and a different continuity with Superman being that Earth's only hero, though the change of setting itself is never fully explained. Helbing later revealed that the show's setting was separate from Earth-Prime, a decision he and DC Entertainment made. He further added that the Superman, Lois Lane, Lucy Lane and John Diggle in the series are doppelgangers of the ones on Earth-Prime.

== Release ==
=== Broadcast ===
Superman & Lois premiered on The CW on February 23, 2021. After a delay in production caused by COVID-19, the series went on hiatus after the fifth episode, during which the sixth and final season of Supergirl took over the series' timeslot. The second season premiered on January 11, 2022. The third season premiered on March 14, 2023. The fourth and final season premiered on October 7, 2024.

CTV Sci-Fi Channel aired the series in Canada. The BBC acquired the UK broadcast rights to the show. The series premiered on BBC One on December 4, 2021, and was made available to stream on BBC iPlayer.

=== Home media ===
Beginning March 5, 2021, extended versions of episodes of Superman & Lois started streaming on The CW's app and website a day after the release of an episode. The entire first season became available on HBO Max on September 17, 2021. The second season was made available on July 29, 2022. The third season was released on the rebranded Max streaming service on July 28, 2023. The fourth season was released on January 1, 2025.

Season one of the series was released on Blu-ray and DVD in the U.S. on October 19, 2021. Season two was released on September 27, 2022. The third season was released on June 11, 2024. The fourth season as well as the complete series was released on April 1, 2025.

== Reception ==
=== Critical response ===
On Rotten Tomatoes, the series has an approval rating of 88%, with an average rating of 7.8/10. The website's critical consensus reads "Though it may be a bit too grounded for some viewers, Superman & Lois draws strength from unexpected places – without skimping on the action – to carve its own path in a crowded superhero universe." On Metacritic, it has a weighted average score of 65 out of 100 based on 18 reviews, indicating "generally favorable reviews".

=== Ratings ===
Viewership and ratings per season of Superman & Lois
Season	Timeslot (ET)	Episodes	First aired		Last aired		TV season	Viewership rank	Avg. viewers (millions)
Season	Timeslot (ET)	Episodes	Date	Viewers (millions)	Date	Viewers (millions)	TV season	Viewership rank	Avg. viewers (millions)
1	Tuesday 9:00 p.m.	15	February 23, 2021	1.75	August 17, 2021	0.67	2020–21	116	2.44
2	Tuesday 8:00 p.m.	15	January 11, 2022	1.09	June 28, 2022	0.82	2021–22	115	1.60
3	Tuesday 8:00 p.m.	13	March 14, 2023	0.75	June 27, 2023	0.73	2022–23	110	1.15
4	Monday 8:00 p.m.	10	October 7, 2024	0.45	December 2, 2024	0.51	2024–25	TBD	TBD

=== Accolades ===
Year	Award	Category	Recipient	Result	Ref
2021	Hollywood Critics Association TV Awards	Best Broadcast Network Series, Drama	—N/a	Nominated	
2021	Harvey Awards	Best Adaptation from Comic Book/Graphic Novel	—N/a	Nominated	
2021	People's Choice Awards	The Sci-Fi/Fantasy Show of 2021	—N/a	Nominated	
2022	Critics Choice Super Awards	Best Actor in a Superhero Series	Tyler Hoechlin	Nominated	
2022	Critics Choice Super Awards	Best Superhero Series	—N/a	Nominated	
2022	American Society of Cinematographers Awards	Outstanding Achievement in Episode of a One-Hour Television Series – Commercial	Gavin Struthers	Nominated	
2022	CAFTCAD Awards	Best Costume Design in TV - Sci-Fi/Fantasy	Katrina McCarthy	Nominated	
2022	Hollywood Critics Association TV Awards	Best Broadcast Network Series, Drama	—N/a	Nominated	
2022	Saturn Awards	Science Fiction Television Series: Network / Cable	—N/a	Won	
2022	Saturn Awards	Actor in a Network / Cable Series	Tyler Hoechlin	Nominated	
2022	Saturn Awards	Actress in a Network / Cable Series	Elizabeth Tulloch	Nominated	
2022	Saturn Awards	Supporting Actress in a Network / Cable Series	Emmanuelle Chriqui	Nominated	
2022	Saturn Awards	Performance by a Younger Actor: Network / Cable Series	Jordan Elsass	Nominated	
2022	Saturn Awards	Performance by a Younger Actor: Network / Cable Series	Alex Garfin	Nominated	
2024	Saturn Awards	Best Superhero Television Series	—N/a	Won	
2024	Saturn Awards	Best Actor in a Television Series	Tyler Hoechlin	Nominated	
2024	Saturn Awards	Best Actress in a Television Series	Elizabeth Tulloch	Nominated	
2024	Critics Choice Super Awards	Best Superhero Series, Limited Series or Made-for-TV Movie	—N/a	Nominated	
2025	Saturn Awards	Best Superhero Television Series	—N/a	Nominated	
2025	Saturn Awards	Dan Curtis Legacy Award	—N/a	Won	
2025	Critics Choice Super Awards	Best Superhero Series, Limited Series or Made-for-TV Movie	—N/a	Nominated	
2025	Critics Choice Super Awards	Best Actor in a Superhero Series, Limited Series or Made-for-TV Movie	Tyler Hoechlin	Nominated	

== Comic book tie-ins ==
DC Comics published Earth-Prime, a six-issue comic event set entirely in the universe of DC's superhero shows. Each of the first five issues spotlight a different CW/DC superhero series, with the sixth issue serving as a crossover finale. The comic series is considered part of the superhero television shows' canon. Earth-Prime #2 features Superman & Lois, written by Adam Mallinger, Jai Jamison and Andrew Wong with art by Tom Grummett and Norm Rapmund and was released on April 19, 2022. The comic includes Clark and Lois trying to celebrate their first wedding anniversary, Clark remembering his father Jonathan on Father's Day, and the origin story of the Superman from John Henry Irons's unnamed Earth. By the sixth issue, the Superman from Irons' unnamed Earth was used by Magog to help attack Earth-Prime's heroes while Earth-Prime's Superman was seen in the final story with the Justice League.
