= Inde Navarrette =

American actress (born 2001)

- Navarrette in 2025
- Born: Danielle Fabiola Navarrette; March 3, 2001 (age 25); Tucson, Arizona, U.S.
- Occupation: Actress
- Years active: 2018–present

Danielle Fabiola "Inde" Navarrette (/ˈɪndi ˌnævəˈrɛti/ IN-dee NAV-ə-RET-ee; born March 3, 2001) is an American actress. She began acting in short films as a teenager before landing roles in the drama series 13 Reasons Why (2020) and the superhero series Superman & Lois (2021–2024). Navarrette attained global stardom for headlining the supernatural horror film Obsession (2025), winning several accolades, including a Critics' Choice Award. She will also portray Rogue in the untitled X-Men film (2028) set in the Marvel Cinematic Universe.

== Early life ==
Danielle Fabiola Navarrette was born on March 3, 2001, in Tucson, Arizona. Her father is of Mexican descent and served in the United States Marine Corps, and her mother is an Australian hairstylist. Because her father served in the U.S. military, Navarrette's family relocated frequently, and by age 15, she had attended 11 schools. While moving, she saw each new school as a way to reinvent herself every time. After her parents separated, Navarrette was raised primarily in Visalia, California, briefly attending Mt. Whitney High School there before moving to the Los Angeles area and enrolling at Redondo Union High School.

Despite growing up around a Latino family, she did not learn Spanish because her father and grandfather did not speak it either. Navarrette credits both sides of her family for sparking her interest in acting. Her paternal family introduced her to horror films at a young age, and her maternal family regularly watched the Academy Awards. Her mother gave her the nickname "Inde" because of her independent nature as a child. Navarrette has four siblings.

== Career ==
Navarrette's first role was starring as Veronica in the 2019 Snapchat original sitcom Denton's Death Date. In 2020, she was cast in season four of the Netflix series 13 Reasons Why as Estela de la Cruz. In 2021, Navarrette signed with Creative Artists Agency (CAA). Later that year, she starred as Sarah Cortez in Superman & Lois. In June 2023, it was announced that Navarrette and six of her co-stars were departing the show for the fourth and final season due to budget cuts. Navarrette returned to make a few minor appearances in season four. In 2025, Navarrette played Teresa Flores in the action film Trap House.

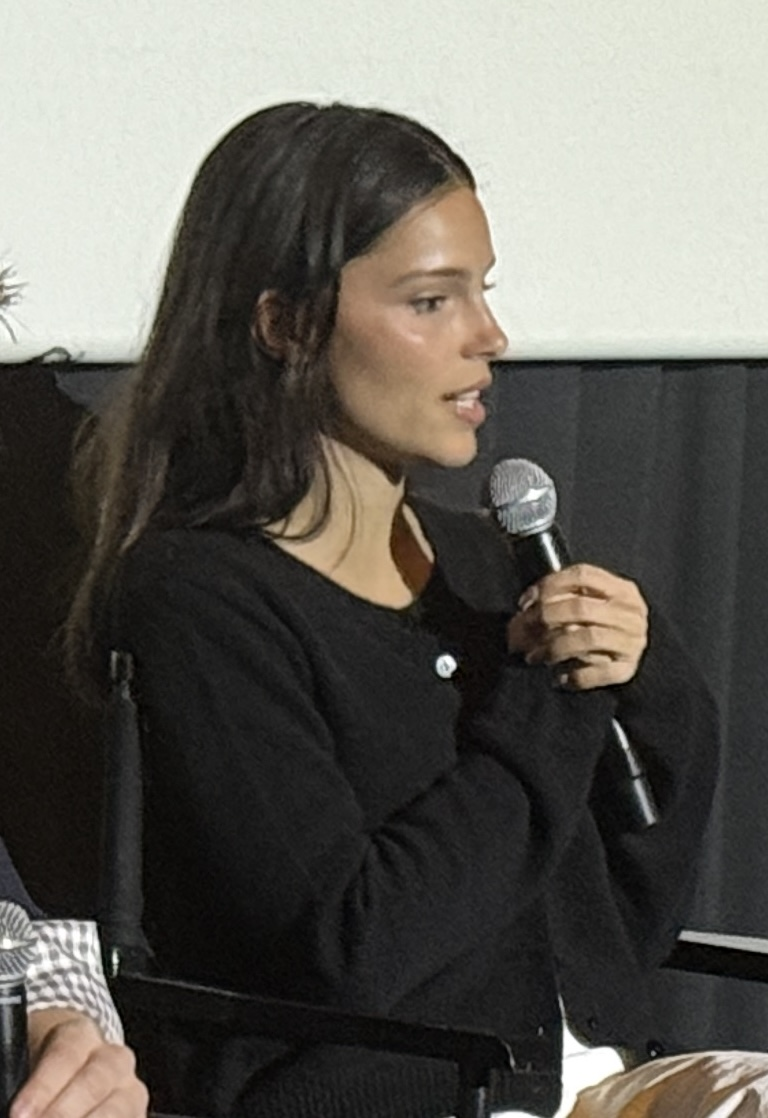
Actress Inde Navarrette in 2026 for a Q&A of her film Obsession, in Los Angeles.

Navarrette starred as Nikki Freeman in the horror film Obsession, which premiered at the Toronto International Film Festival on September 5, 2025, before a United States theatrical release by Focus Features on May 15, 2026. Her performance received critical acclaim, with critics highlighting her emotional vulnerability and physical intensity. Louis Peitzman of Vulture called it a standout performance for Navarrette, especially as her first major role in the horror genre. Katie Rife of RogerEbert.com said her emotional scenes revealed the humanity behind Nikki's violent behavior and made the character more tragic. Guy Lodge of Variety praised Navarrette for "acing one of the more physically and emotionally taxing horror leads to come down the pike in a while". Focus Features initiated an awards campaign for Navarrette in the fall of 2026. Bill Bria of /Film compared Nikki's impact to performances in classic horror films such as The Exorcist (1973) and Carrie (1976). Following the success of Obsession, Navarrette said she appreciated the story remaining a standalone film, while expressing interest in continuing to work in the horror genre. She later added: "Everything has changed for me, I’m now in rooms I could never even imagine. I’m pitching my own projects and am hopefully can produce and direct my own stuff." While developing her portrayal of Nikki, Navarrette considered additional backstory for the character that was not included in the final film, including Nikki's ambitions and views on love. She also sought to play Nikki with emotional complexity and a history of trauma than defining her through obsessive behavior.

After a year and a half without an acting role, during which she walked dogs and streamed online to make ends meet, Navarrette landed a lead role in the horror film Invertigo. In the summer of 2026, she appeared in a music video for singer Sombr as well as in a Gap commercial alongside American musician Malcolm Todd. The same year, after meeting director Jake Schreier and expressing interest in portraying Mystique, it was announced that Navarrette was cast as Rogue in an untitled X-Men reboot set in the Marvel Cinematic Universe (MCU) with a planned 2028 release. Additionally, she is signed on to star in The Waffle House Index, a science fiction thriller film produced and released by Apple Studios; she is also an executive producer for the film. She hosted an episode of Saturday Night Live on October 31, 2026.

== Personal life ==
Navarrette is bisexual. She is a gamer who has livestreamed gameplay such as Call of Duty on Twitch and YouTube under the username "Inde_navarrette".

== Filmography ==
Key
| † | Denotes film or TV productions that have not yet been released |

=== Film ===
| Year | Title | Role(s) | Notes | Ref. |
|---|---|---|---|---|
| 2018 | Cross Words Together | Alice | Short film | |
| 2020 | Wander Darkly | Young Ellie | | |
| 2020 | Cranberry Nights | Juana | Short film | |
| 2021 | #Whitina | Genesis | Short film | |
| 2021 | BFFS | Paloma | Short film | |
| 2025 | Obsession | Nikki Freeman | | |
| 2025 | Trap House | Teresa Flores | | |

=== Television ===
| Year | Title | Role(s) | Notes | Ref. |
|---|---|---|---|---|
| 2020 | 13 Reasons Why | Estela de la Cruz | 9 episodes | |
| 2021–2024 | Superman & Lois | Sarah Cortez | Main role; 47 episodes | |
| 2026 | Saturday Night Live | Herself | Episode: "Inde Navarrette / Gracie Abrams" | |

=== Music videos ===
List of music video appearances, with year, artist, title, notes, and reference(s) shown
| Year | Artist | Title | Notes | Ref. |
|---|---|---|---|---|
| 2026 | Sombr | "My Body Isn't Ready" | Guest appearance | |

=== Web series ===
List of web series appearances, with year, title, role, notes, and reference(s) shown
| Year | Title | Role(s) | Notes | Ref. |
|---|---|---|---|---|
| 2019 | Denton's Death Date | Veronica | Main role; 10 episodes (Snapchat original series) | |

=== Video games ===
| Year | Title | Role(s) | Notes | Ref. |
|---|---|---|---|---|
| 2026 | Fortnite | Nikki Freeman | Likeness only | |

== Awards and nominations ==
| Year | Award | Category | Work | Ref. | Result |
|---|---|---|---|---|---|
| 2026 | Astra Midseason Movie Awards | Best Actress | Obsession | Won | |
| 2026 | Celebración of Cinema & Television | Breakthrough Actress Award – Film | Obsession | Won | |
| 2026 | Critics Choice Super Awards | Best Actress in a Horror Movie | Obsession | Won | |
| 2026 | Fangoria Chainsaw Awards | Best Lead Performance | Obsession | Won | |
| 2026 | Gotham Independent Film Awards | Spotlight Tribute | Obsession | Honored | |
| 2026 | IMDB STARmeter Awards | Breakthrough Star of 2026 | Obsession | Won | |
| 2026 | Seattle International Film Festival | Best Performance | Obsession | Won | |
