= Bruno Mannheim =

Publication information
- Publisher: DC Comics
- First appearance: Superman's Pal Jimmy Olsen #139 (July 1971)
- Created by: Jack Kirby

In-story information
- Alter ego: Bruno "Ugly" Mannheim
- Species: Human
- Place of origin: Earth
- Team affiliations: Intergang

Bruno "Ugly" Mannheim is a supervillain appearing American comic books published by DC Comics. He is an Intergang crime boss who is the son of Moxie Mannheim and one of Superman's enemies.

Chad L. Coleman portrayed Mannheim in the third and fourth seasons of Superman & Lois. Additionally, Bruce Weitz, Kevin Michael Richardson, and Trevor Devall have voiced the character in animation.

== Publication history ==
The character first appeared in Superman's Pal Jimmy Olsen #139 (July 1971) and was created by Jack Kirby.

== Fictional character biography ==
=== Pre-Crisis ===
Bruno Mannheim is a member of Intergang working under the clone of Morgan Edge. He is also the son of Moxie "Boss" Mannheim. Mannheim and his minions kidnap Guardian, Goody Rickels, and the Newsboy Legion and have them eat a meal laced with pyro-granulate, an Apokoliptian mineral that will kill them within 24 hours. Guardian forces Mannheim to give up the antidote for the pyro-granulate, enabling him to save himself, Jimmy Olsen, Rickels, and the Newsboy Legion.

=== Post-Crisis ===
In post-Crisis continuity, Bruno Mannheim is a member of Intergang. While Superman is dealing with a storm, Mannheim calls a meeting with the Intergang council of war to find a way to discredit Clark Kent, Lois Lane, and Cat Grant before Morgan Edge's trial.

Mannheim and Intergang collaborate with Toyman in his revenge on Lex Luthor. When Mannheim complains that Toyman is going to attract attention to him, Toyman urges Mannheim to stay out of his affairs.

During the Infinite Crisis storyline, Mannheim becomes one of Metropolis' most powerful gangsters and the leader of Intergang.

Bruno Mannheim returns in 52, where he claims to have been "reborn" thanks to the New God Darkseid, and to have become a psychopath. In Issue #25, Mannheim has Intergang follow the Crime Bible, a religious text that venerates Cain as the first murderer. He is also shown to now be a cannibal, killing and then eating those whom do not submit to (or simply do not immediately join) Intergang.

Over the course of the series, he comes into conflict with Renee Montoya, Nightwing and the new Batwoman, whom he wishes to sacrifice. Mannheim captures Batwoman and has her bound and gagged to a sacrificial altar, stabbing her through the heart shortly thereafter. When Montoya arrives and rescues Batwoman, she rips Mannheim's knife out of her chest and impales him in the back, seemingly fatally. Batwoman survives her injuries.

Mannheim is later revealed to have survived and mutated into a giant. Superman encounters Mannheim, who states that Darkseid is not his master anymore before teleporting away.

=== The New 52 ===
In 2011, The New 52 rebooted the DC universe. Bruno Mannheim is seen as a member of Intergang when Gotham City falls to the Religion of Crime.

== In other media ==
=== Television ===
- Bruno Mannheim appears in Superman: The Animated Series, voiced by Bruce Weitz. This version indirectly contributed to Toyman becoming a supervillain. Throughout his appearances, Mannheim leads Intergang in using high-tech weapons provided by Kanto before eventually meeting the latter's boss Darkseid, who tasks Mannheim with causing a nuclear meltdown in preparation for an Apokoliptian invasion with the promise of political power. While Mannheim succeeds, Darkseid betrays him and leaves him to be killed in the ensuing explosion. Following Mannheim's death, Granny Goodness takes over Intergang.
- Bruno Mannheim appears in the Smallville episode "Stiletto", portrayed by Dominic Zamprogna. This version is initially an underling of the Ace o' Clubs' owner and mob boss Ron Milano before killing him.
- Bruno Mannheim appears in Young Justice, voiced by Kevin Michael Richardson.
- Bruno Mannheim appears in Superman & Lois, portrayed by Chad L. Coleman. This version is an African-American criminal operating in Hob's Bay, the husband of Peia Mannheim, and the father of Matteo Mannheim who became the head of Intergang after killing its founder Antony "Boss" Moxie.

=== Film ===
Bruno Mannheim appears in The Death of Superman, voiced by Trevor Devall.

=== Video games ===
- Bruno Mannheim appears in Superman: Countdown to Apokolips.
- Bruno Mannheim appears in DC Universe Online, voiced by Bruce Carey.
- Bruno Mannheim appears as a character summon in Scribblenauts Unmasked: A DC Comics Adventure.

=== Miscellaneous ===
- The Smallville incarnation of Bruno Mannheim appears in Smallville Season 11, in which he becomes the leader of Intergang, gains possession of the Crime Bible, and is incarcerated at Stryker's Island.
- Bruno Mannheim appears in The Batman Strikes! #44, in which he works with Rupert Thorne to create an army of super-villains. He also turns himself into a Metallo only to be defeated by Batman and Superman.
- Bruno Mannheim appears in DC x Sonic the Hedgehog: Metal Legion. In Issue #1, he and Intergang are shown recruiting Rough, Tumble, and Clutch the Opossum.
