= Tayler Buck =

American actress (born 2003)

- Born: November 14, 2003 (age 22); United States
- Occupation: Actress
- Years active: 2010–present

Tayler Buck is an American actress best known for playing Natalie Lane Irons / Starlight in Superman & Lois and Sandra Washington in Tyler Perry's Assisted Living.

== Career ==
Bucks first role was in an episode of Private Practice. Her first film role came in the horror Annabelle: Creation. Her first recurring role was in the cartoon Clarence as Caitlin. She received acclaim for her performance in Princess of the Row Her first main role was as Sandra Washington in the sitcom Tyler Perry's Assisted Living. She was then cast as Natalie Lane Irons in Superman & Lois Buck along with Sofia Hasmik were promoted to regulars for season 2. She was one of 7 cast members who was released before season 4 due to budget difficulties. Her most recent role was in a short called The Girl on a Motorcyle which also stars her Annabelle: Creation co-star Lou Lou Safran.

== Filmography ==
=== Film ===
Year	Title	Role	Notes
2014	Lemonade War	Addie	Short
2015	The Daughters of Eve	Lydia	Short
2016	Transcend	Bianca	Short
2017	Annabelle: Creation	Kate	
2019	Princess of the Row	Alicia Williams	

=== Television ===
Year	Title	Role	Notes
2010	Private Practice	Megan	Episode: "Pulling the Plug"
2012	BlackBoxTV	Kristina	Episode: "Silverwood: Kidnapped"
2012	CSI: NY	Dee	Episode; "The Lady in the Lake"
2013	Key & Peele	Little Girl	Episode: "East/West Bowl Rap"
2016	American Crime Story	Melodie Cochran	Episode: "The Race Card"
2014–2016	Clarence	Courtlin	8 episodes
2020–present	Tyler Perry's Assisted Living	Sandra Washington	Main role
2021–2024	Superman & Lois	Natalie Lane Irons / Starlight	Guest role (season 1), main role (seasons 2–4); 33 episodes
2025	Doctor Odyssey	Hailey	Episode: "Hot Tub Week"
2025	Criminal Minds	Ariel Ramsey	Episode: "I'm Fine, It's Fine. Everything is Fine"
