= Dylan Walsh =

American actor (born 1963)

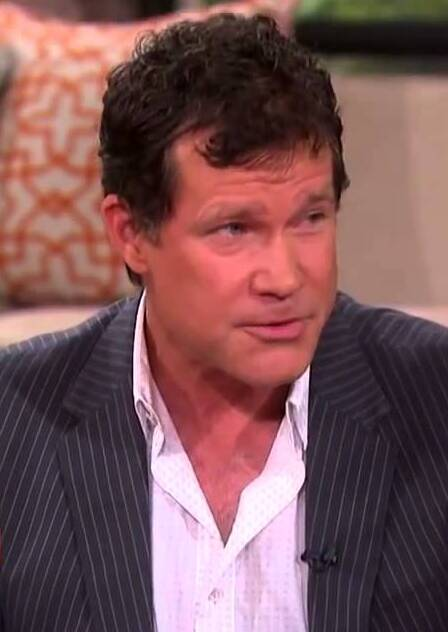
- Walsh in 2014
- Born: Charles Hunter Walsh; November 17, 1963 (age 63); Los Angeles, California, U.S.
- Education: University of Virginia
- Occupation: Actor
- Years active: 1987–present
- Spouses: Melora Walters (m. 1996; div. 2003); Joanna Going (m. 2004; div. 2012); Leslie Bourque (m. 2022)
- Children: 5

Dylan Walsh (born Charles Hunter Walsh; November 17, 1963) is an American actor. He is best known for his roles as Dr. Sean McNamara on the FX television series Nip/Tuck, Al Burns on Unforgettable, Sam Lane on Superman & Lois, and David Hollander on Heated Rivalry.

== Early life ==
Walsh was born Charles Hunter Walsh in Los Angeles, California. His maternal grandfather, Frank P. Haven, was a managing editor of the Los Angeles Times. His parents worked for the Foreign Service—they met in Ethiopia. As a result, Walsh lived in Kenya, India, Pakistan, and Indonesia as a child. His family returned to the United States when he was ten years old and settled in Virginia, where Walsh began acting in high school. He graduated from the University of Virginia in 1986 with a degree in English. After graduating from college, Walsh moved to New York City to act professionally. Per Julia Roberts, she met Dylan who was working as a waiter at Empire Diner in New York and she introduced him to her manager, Robert McGowan, who signed Dylan.

== Career ==
Walsh's first role was in a television movie called Soldier Boys with James Earl Jones. He then landed a role in the movie Loverboy and a regular role on the television series Kate & Allie. In 1989, he started using the name Dylan Walsh professionally. He continued to work in films including Betsy's Wedding, Nobody's Fool, Congo, The Stepfather, and Secretariat and guest starred the television series Brooklyn South, The Twilight Zone, and Everwood.

In 2003, Walsh landed the role of Sean McNamara on the FX television series Nip/Tuck, after being approached by series creator Ryan Murphy in a coffee shop. Murphy remembered him from his roles in Nobody's Fool and in a television movie.

Walsh starred as Lieutenant Al Burns in all four seasons of CBS's crime-drama series Unforgettable, which ran from 2011 to 2016.

In April 2020, Walsh was cast as Sam Lane, the father of Lois Lane, on The CW action-superhero series Superman & Lois.

== Personal life ==
Walsh was married from 1996 to 2003 to actress Melora Walters, with whom he had two children, Thomas Walsh (b. 1996) and Joanna Walsh (b. 1997). After the couple divorced, Walsh married actress Joanna Going on October 10, 2004, and the two had a daughter, Stella Walsh, who was born in 2003. In 2010, Walsh announced he had filed for divorce.

Walsh met Leslie Bourque and had a daughter, Amelie Belle, and a son, Hudson Scott. Walsh and Bourque were married June 3, 2022 in New Orleans, Louisiana.

On August 15, 2025, Walsh was involved in a single car accident with his wife and their two children in Rumson, New Jersey. $5000 of electrical damage was done to a nearby residence after Walsh struck a utility pole. Police issued Walsh citations for six motor vehicle violations including having open containers of alcohol in a motor vehicle, reckless driving and expired registration. While Walsh acknowledged to officers that he had been drinking earlier in the day, his team clarified that his blood alcohol content (BAC) tested below the legal limit. Walsh was not charged with driving while intoxicated and the accident was most likely caused by heat stroke or heat exhaustion.

== Filmography ==
=== Film ===
Year	Title	Role	Notes
1989	Loverboy	Jory Talbot	Credited as Charles Hunter Walsh
1989	When We Were Young	Lee Jameson	TV movie Credited as Charles Hunter Walsh
1989	Chameleons	Stan	TV movie
1990	Betsy's Wedding	Jake Lovell	
1990	Where the Heart Is	Tom	
1993	Arctic Blue	Eric Desmond	
1993	Telling Secrets	Jesse Graham	TV movie
1994	Nobody's Fool	Peter Sullivan	
1994	Radio Inside	Michael Anderson	
1995	Congo	Dr. Peter Elliot	
1996	Eden	Bill Kunen	
1997	Men	Teo Morrison	
1997	Divided by Hate	Louis Gibbs	TV movie
1997	Changing Habits	Felix Shepherd	
1998	The Almost Perfect Bank Robbery	Frank Syler	TV movie
1999	Chapter Zero	Adam Lazarus	
1999	Final Voyage	Aaron Carpenter	
2001	Jet Boy	Boon Palmer	
2001	Deadly Little Secrets	Cole Chamberlain	
2002	Jo	n/a	TV movie
2002	Blood Work	Detective John Waller	
2002	We Were Soldiers	Capt. Robert Edwards	
2002	Power Play	Matt Nash	
2002	Par 6	Mac Hegelman	
2003	The Lone Ranger	Kansas City Haas	TV movie
2003	More Than Meets the Eye: The Joan Brock Story	Jim Brock	TV movie
2005	Edmond	Interrogator	
2005	Antebody	Jacob Ambro	Short film
2006	The Lake House	Morgan Price	
2007	Lost Holiday: The Jim and Suzanne Shemwell Story	Jim Shemwell	TV movie
2008	Just Add Water	Ray Tuckby	
2009	The Stepfather	David Harris	
2010	Secretariat	Jack Tweedy II	
2014	Authors Anonymous	Alan Mooney	
2016	C Street	Senator Fallon	
2018	Fright Fest	Spencer Crowe	
2019	Deadly Switch	Peter	
2019	Alter Ego	Alan Schaeffer	

=== Television ===
Year	Title	Role	Notes
1989	Kate & Allie	Ben	Episode: "The Nearlyweds"
1990–1991	Gabriel's Fire	Louis Klein	22 episodes
1995	The Outer Limits	Sgt. Eldritch	Episode: "Hearts and Minds"
1997–1998	Brooklyn South	Officer Jimmy Doyle	22 episodes
2002	The Twilight Zone	Adam	Episode: "Night Route"
2002	Presidio Med	Danny Gibson	Episode: "Second Chance"
2003–2010	Nip/Tuck	Dr. Sean McNamara	100 episodes
2003–2004	Everwood	Carl Feeney	3 episodes
2007	Law & Order: Special Victims Unit	Malcolm Royce	Episode: "Annihilated"
2011–2016	Unforgettable	Al Burns	61 episodes
2012	Drop Dead Diva	Lawrence Brand	Episode: "Pick's and Pakes"
2012	CSI: Crime Scene Investigation	Tom Cooley	Episode: "CSI on Fire"
2013	Revenge	Jason Prosser	2 episodes
2013	Castle	Agent Harris	2 episodes
2015	NCIS: New Orleans	Captain Jim Messier	3 episodes
2016	Designated Survivor	SEAL Commander Max Clarkson	Episode: "The Mission"
2016	Longmire	Shane Muldoon	3 episodes
2017	When We Rise	Dr. Marcus Conant	2 episodes
2018	Life Sentence	Peter Abbott	Main role
2018	Law & Order: Special Victims Unit	John Conway	2 episodes
2019	Whiskey Cavalier	Alex Ollerman	4 episodes
2019–2024	Blue Bloods	Mayor Peter Chase	Recurring role
2021–2024	Superman & Lois	General Sam Lane, Bizarro Sam Lane	Main role
2024	SEAL Team	Captain Walch	Recurring role
2025–present	Heated Rivalry	David Hollander	4 episodes
