= Erik Valdez =

American actor

- Born: Russell Erik Valdez; Lubbock, Texas, U.S.
- Occupation: Actor
- Years active: 2004–present
- Known for: General Hospital; Superman & Lois
- Spouse: Candice Lopez (m. 2016)
- Children: 1

Erik Valdez (born Russell Erik Valdez) is an American actor. He is best known for his roles as Trey Mitchell in the soap opera television series General Hospital (2012–2013), Carlito Solano Jr. in the drama television series Graceland (2014–2015) and Kyle Cushing in the superhero television series Superman & Lois (2021–2024).

== Early life ==
His father is of Mexican and Native American descent, while his mother is of English and Irish descent. His parents were second-generation cotton farmers and he grew up in a close-knit family.

== Career ==
After completing theater throughout the years since high school, Valdez pursued an acting career in film and television and he moved to Los Angeles in 2004. The same year, he made his acting debut as Chad in three episodes of Gilmore Girls. He has made guest appearances television shows, including CSI: Miami, 90210, Numbers and Mistresses. In 2012, Valdez played the recurring role of Trey Mitchell in the ABC soap opera television series General Hospital, until 2013 for 99 episodes, which earned Valdez a nomination for an NAACP Image Award for Outstanding Actor in a Daytime Drama Series. From 2014 to 2015, Valdez played the role of crime boss Carlito Solano Jr. in the drama television series Graceland for 11 episodes. In 2016, he played the role of Lopez in the direct-to-video film Jarhead 3: The Siege. The same year, he played an uncredited role of Officer Valducci in the drama film Paint It Black. In 2021, he portrayed the character Kyle Cushing in the superhero drama television series Superman & Lois, which premiered on The CW, featuring Tyler Hoechlin and Elizabeth Tulloch.

== Personal life ==
In 2015, Valdez proposed to his longtime girlfriend, Candice Lopez, a hostess for Radio Disney, and they married in 2016. Together, they have a son: Enzo Ray Valdez (b. 2018).

== Filmography ==
=== Film ===
| Year | Title | Role | Notes |
|---|---|---|---|
| 2010 | Zombrex: Dead Rising Sun | Dan (voice) | |
| 2016 | Jarhead 3: The Siege | Lopez | Direct-to-video |
| 2016 | Paint It Black | Officer Valducci | Uncredited |
| 2023 | Confidential Informant | Carlos | |

=== Television ===
| Year | Title | Role | Notes |
|---|---|---|---|
| 2004 | Gilmore Girls | Chad | 3 episodes |
| 2005 | The O.C. | Jock | Uncredited; Episode: "The Chrismukkah Bar Mitz-vahkkah" |
| 2007 | CSI: Miami | Frat Boy #2 | Episode: "Sunblock" |
| 2008 | Numbers | FBI Agent | Uncredited; Episode: "Checkmate" |
| 2011–2012 | New Girl | D. Bag / Douchebag #2 | Episode: "Bad in Bed" and "The Story of the 50" |
| 2012 | 90210 | Eric | Episode: "A Tale of Two Parties" |
| 2012–2013 | General Hospital | Trey Mitchell | 99 episodes |
| 2012 | Breaking In | Hector | Episode: "The Hungover" |
| 2014–2015 | Graceland | Carlito Solano Jr. | 11 episodes |
| 2016 | Mistresses | Les Cheron | Episode; "Fight or Flight" |
| 2021–2024 | Superman & Lois | Kyle Cushing | Main cast |

=== Video games ===
| Year | Title | Role | Notes |
|---|---|---|---|
| 2012 | Syndicate | Subverter (voice) | |
| 2021 | Far Cry 6 | General José Castillo (voice) | |
