= Sofia Hasmik =

American actress (born 1991)

- Born: 27 January 1991 (age 35); Los Angeles, California
- Occupation: Actress
- Years active: 2014–present

Sofia Hasmik (born January 27, 1991) is an American actress. She is well known for playing Chrissy Beppo in Superman & Lois.

== Early life ==
Hasmik was born in Los Angeles to Armenian parents. Hasmik's passion for acting came when she was in the last year in high school when she participated in a school play. Hasmik received her Theater BFA from the University of California Santa Barbara.

== Career ==
Hasmik’s first recurring role of her acting career was when she played Ashta in Mad About You. Hasmik then starred alongside Elle Fanning and Justice Smith in All the Bright Places. Hasmiks biggest role yet came when she got the part of Chrissy Beppo in Superman & Lois. Hasmik was made a regular for season 2. It was announced in June 2023 that Hasmik and 6 of her co-stars were departing the show for season 4 due to budget cuts but the plan is for some of them to appear as a cameo if possible. Hasmik returned to make a few minor appearances in season 4. In 2026, Hasmik joined the cast of the HBO Max medical drama series The Pitt in a recurring capacity its second season as Dr. Nazely Toomarian, an intern in the ER.

== Filmography ==
=== Film ===
| Year | Title | Role | Notes |
|---|---|---|---|
| 2017 | Three | Herself | Short |
| 2018 | Hello, My Name Is Doris | Ines | |
| 2017 | Abrasion | Ashlee | Short |
| 2018 | Bad Samaritan | Jocelyn | |
| 2019 | Everyone Together | Brooke | |
| 2019 | All the Bright Places | Brenda | |
| 2020 | Audition Room 2 | Assistant | Short |

=== Television ===
| Year | Title | Role | Notes |
|---|---|---|---|
| 2019 | Mad About You | Ashta | 4 episodes |
| 2021–2024 | Superman & Lois | Chrissy Beppo | Recurring role (season 1), main role (seasons 2–4); 40 episodes |
| 2025 | The Neighborhood | Allison | 2 episodes |
| 2026 | The Pitt | Dr. Nazely Toomarian | Recurring role (season 2) |
| 2026 | Tires | Lucy | Recurring role (season 3) |
