= Smallville (comics) =

Fictional US hometown of Superman

- From The New Adventures of Superboy #16 (April 1981), art by Kurt Schaffenberger.
- First appearance: More Fun Comics #101 (January 1945) (Unnamed)
- Genre: Superhero comics

In-universe information
- Type: Town
- Locations: Kansas; Kent family farm; Kent General Store
- Characters: Clark Kent/Superman; Jonathan and Martha Kent; Lana Lang; Pete Ross; Conner Kent; Krypto; Kenny Braverman

Smallville is a fictional town in American comic books published by DC Comics. The childhood hometown of Superman, Smallville was first named in Superboy #2 (May 1949). The town, long in an unnamed US state that was first defined as Kansas in Superman: The Movie (1978), is the setting of many Superboy comics where Superboy defends Smallville from various threats. Since the 1978 appearance in Superman: The Movie, Smallville has been a setting in other non-comic book productions (film, television, video games and novels) featuring Superboy / Superman.

== History ==
The DC Comics universe has several different timelines, with a major reboot in the 1985 Crisis on Infinite Earths.

=== Pre-Crisis ===
In the earliest Golden Age comics, the name of Clark Kent's hometown is uncertain. Earliest stories would either show Clark's hometown as unnamed or even as Metropolis. In Superman #35 (1945) a traveling Clark Kent stops off in Smallville without identifying it as his hometown. However, as of Superboy #2, Smallville's name is permanently identified.

Smallville is retroactively shown as the Golden Age Superman's childhood hometown as well, as seen in the "Mr. and Mrs. Superman" series in Superman Family, as well as in The New Adventures of Superboy #15-16 (March–April 1981). Unlike Earth-One's Smallville, Earth-Two's Smallville stays a much less prominent small town since the Earth-Two Superman was never Superboy. Additionally, the Kents never owned a general store on Earth-Two, but instead stayed farmers until their deaths.

=== Post-Crisis ===
Smallville's history, as well as that of the Kents, is delved into in the late 1980s World of Smallville miniseries, plus the 1997-1998 miniseries The Kents.

Later, Smallville was retconned to have a violent history, with green kryptonite, a common substance in the area, having a mutating, dangerous effect on citizens. This history, plus the near-destruction and reconstruction of the town by overzealous government forces, is explored in the storyline "The Search For Kryptonite".

== Law and government ==
Smallville's chief of police is Chief Douglas Parker, who in pre-Crisis stories is considered a close ally of Superboy. Superboy is capable of being contacted by Chief Parker, as well as Lana Lang's father Professor Lewis Lang and the President of the United States, via a secret signal lamp hidden in the Kent household. Parker exists in the post-Crisis DC comics, but his role is much less prominent.

In the modern comics, Smallville also has a sheriff department. It is headed by Sheriff Hayes, who was murdered by Earth-Two's Superman after he was resurrected as a Black Lantern.

A storyline late in the run of The New Adventures of Superboy sees Smallville's town council propose building Smallville's first shopping mall, though the mall's construction is revealed out to have sinister ulterior motives. While the storyline is unfinished as the comic was cancelled before the story could be concluded, it does see Jonathan Kent decide to run for a city council seat to try to thwart the mall's construction.

== People ==
Noted residents of Smallville include the Kent family, Jonathan and Martha Kent, or Ma and Pa Kent as they were often called, and their adopted son Clark Kent; Clark's friend, classmate and sometimes romantic interest Lana Lang; Clark's best friend Pete Ross, and Smallville's chief of police Douglas Parker.

In the original Superboy comics, other noted residents include Professor Phineas Potter (Lana's uncle), archaeologist Lewis Lang (Lana's father), and the young Lex Luthor.

In post-Crisis continuity, Superman's clone Conner Kent lives in Smallville with the now-widowed Martha Kent. The super-powered dog Krypto lives with them as well.

== Features ==
Smallville is usually portrayed as an idyllic, small isolated American town, with a "Middle America" atmosphere – resembling the settings of some paintings of Norman Rockwell. Its residents are generally very friendly, though in Silver Age Superboy stories, it also tends to attract various threats (from criminals, alien invaders, etc.).

Smallville's economy mostly consists of various locally owned businesses, along with various farms surrounding the town, including the Kent family farm. In the original Superboy comics, the Kent family sells their farm when Clark starts school, and open a general store in town. Post-Crisis comics, however, show the Kents residing on their farm through Clark's adulthood.

Smallville has one high school, Smallville High School, which Clark, Lana, and Pete attend.

Smallville also was the home of the Smallville Orphanage, where the Kents originally brought the infant Kal-El after his rocket landed on Earth; the Kents returned several days later to formally adopt Kal-El, renaming him "Clark".

In terms of media, Smallville has had several newspapers mentioned over the years, including the Smallville Sentinel (shown in various stories in The New Adventures of Superboy) and the Smallville Times-Reader (in Elliot S. Maggin's "Last Son of Krypton" text novel). In Action Comics (vol. 2) #8, the Daily Star's editor George Taylor mentions to Clark Kent having met Ma and Pa Kent while working as a reporter for the Smallville Sentinel. Smallville receives most of its television and radio broadcasts from a larger nearby city, though Superboy #195 shows Smallville has its own radio station, WSMV.

In the original Superboy comics, a billboard outside of Smallville greets those driving into and out of town. The billboard features a picture of Superboy waving, with words next to it reading: "Welcome to Smallville, Home of Superboy".

== Location ==
A map of the layout of the Silver Age version of Smallville. From The New Adventures of Superboy #22, October 1981.

Similar to the whereabouts of other fictional DC Universe cities, the location of Smallville was, originally, never specifically stated in the comics.

Smallville's location varied widely throughout many stories, many of which placed Smallville close to Metropolis and Midvale, home of Supergirl. All-New Collectors' Edition #C-55 (1978) calls Smallville "a quiet town, nestled in the hills just inland from the eastern seaboard". Most sources since the 1986 John Byrne Superman origin reboot point the location of Smallville to be in Kansas. In Amazing World of DC Comics #14 (1977), an officially sanctioned fanzine with articles on DC Comics characters and series, Smallville was instead stated to be in Maryland.

A map of Legion-era Metropolis included in Legion of Super-Heroes (vol. 2) #313 (July 1984) indicates that Smallville was believed by the 1980s to be somewhere in northeastern Pennsylvania or northern New Jersey, while incorporated into Metropolis proper at that time as a historical district. In revisions of the map published after 1986, this was retroactively removed to accommodate changes of Smallville's location in other titles, as detailed below.

In the Superboy story in Superman Family #195 (May–June 1979), Interstate 70 is shown as running through or near Smallville, as Lana and Clark drive along the highway. States the real-world Interstate 70 passes through include Utah, Colorado, Kansas (Smallville's usual post-Crisis location), Missouri, Illinois, Indiana, Ohio, West Virginia, Pennsylvania, and Maryland (cited in some pre-Crisis references as Smallville's location).

In the novel The Death and Life of Superman (1993), Jonathan and Martha Kent drive to Smallville from the Great Bend, Kansas, airport which would put Smallville somewhere in central Kansas.

In the limited series The Kents (vol. 1) #11 (June 1998), places Smallville along the Arkansas River.

In Action Comics (vol. 1) #822 (February 2005) - "Repo Man Pt. 1", Smallville is placed approximately 55 miles from Salina, Kansas, and in line with Junction City, giving it approximately the same location as Dorrance, Kansas.

== In other media ==
=== Television ===
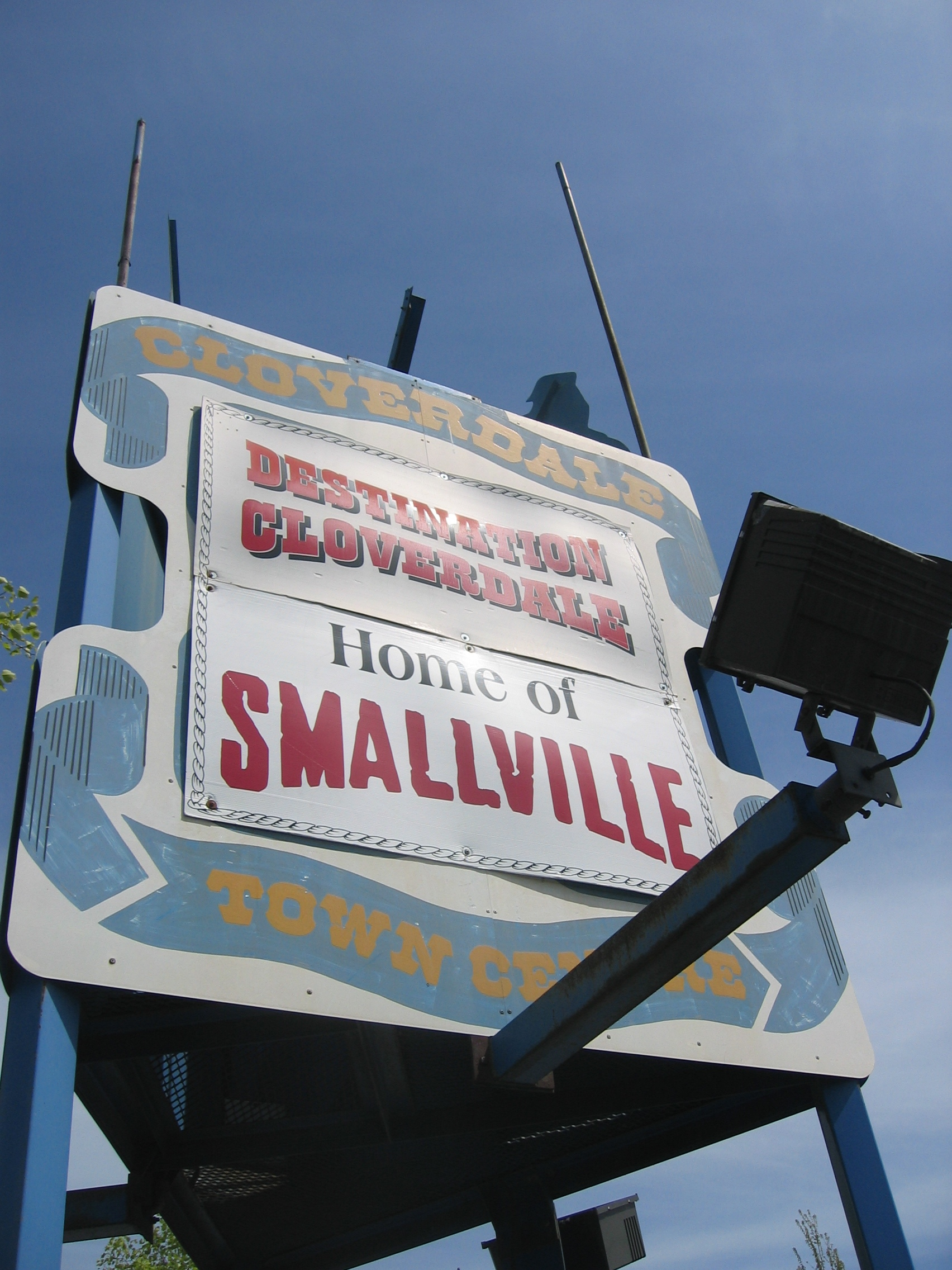
The Cloverdale welcome sign, the "Home of Smallville". This Canadian town was one of the filming locations that portrayed Smallville in the popular TV series.

- The Superboy TV series (1988–1992) places Smallville in Kansas, stating it is where Clark and Lana grew up. The main action of that series takes place at the fictional Shuster University in Florida, named for Superman/Superboy's co-creator, artist, Joe Shuster.
- Lois & Clark: The New Adventures of Superman (1993–1997) places Smallville as a city in Kansas as well, with Metropolis located on the east coast.
- Smallville appears in Superman: The Animated Series (1996–2000). It was also in Kansas.
  - Smallville appears in Justice League.
  - Smallville appears in the Justice League Unlimited episode "Fearful Symmetry".
- In the television series Smallville (2001–2011), the town's location is two hundred miles west of Wichita and southwest of Dodge City, implied by the series to be located in west Kansas. The skyline of Metropolis is visible from high points of Smallville on a clear day. Though some episodes reference an hours-long drive from Smallville to Metropolis, characters easily—and frequently—traverse between the two towns. The headquarters of LuthorCorp are in Metropolis, and a LutherCorp plant is located in Smallville. Smallville is famous for a meteor shower that hit the town in 1989, and for the lingering effects of the meteor rocks on the town and some of its citizens. The meteor shower was a cover for the spaceship that brought Clark Kent to Kansas. It was later revealed that the meteor shower also brought Davis Bloome, also known as Doomsday, to Earth as well. The second-season episode "Lineage" gives its ZIP Code as 67524, which is the real life code for Chase, Kansas.
- Smallville appears in the Young Justice episode "True Colors".
- Smallville appears in the Arrowverse crossover event "Elseworlds", in The Flash 2018 episode "Elseworlds, Part 1". The power-swapped Flash and Green Arrow arrive on Earth-38 to enlist the help of Supergirl, who is visiting Superman and Lois Lane at the Kent family farm in Kansas following the arrests of Manchester Black and Agent Liberty. Supergirl and Superman help Flash and Green Arrow work on their swapped powers on the Kent farm.
  - It later appears in Arrowverse crossover event "Crisis on Infinite Earths". Superman, Lois Lane, and Iris West briefly visit Earth-167 (the setting of Smallville), whose version of Clark Kent is suspected to be the Paragon of Hope. They are teleported away by their Lex Luthor who discovered that this world's Clark gave up his powers.
- Smallville appears in Superman & Lois. The married Clark and Lois, with their teenaged sons Jonathan and Jordan, live on a farm just outside the town in Rice County, Kansas.
- Smallville appears in My Adventures with Superman. In the season one finale, "The Hearts of the Fathers", after Jimmy Olsen accidentally activated Superman's ship with kryptonite, Superman teamed up with Jor-El's hologram and Sam Lane to stop the invasion. In the season two finale, "My Adventures with Supergirl", after defeating Brainiac, Superman took his cousin Kara on Smallville to recuperate, where she is welcomed warmly by Superman's parents.

=== Film ===
- Smallville was first placed in Kansas by the 1978 film Superman: The Movie, although filming of the Kent family's agricultural land was done in Blackie, Alberta, Canada. The tag on the truck driven by Jonathan Kent in the first film had a Cloud County, Kansas identifier. Areas of Calgary were presented as Smallville in Superman III while the surrounding fields of the town of Baldock, England portrayed the Kent farm in Superman IV: The Quest for Peace.
- Smallville appears in Superman: Doomsday.
- Smallville appears in Superman/Batman: Apocalypse.
- Smallville appears in Superman vs. The Elite.
- Smallville appears in the films set in the DC Extended Universe:
  - Plano, Illinois was used in Man of Steel, a spaceship was found by local farmer Jonathan Kent and his wife Martha. They discovered a baby in the ship and raised him as their own, naming him Clark Kent. Clark grew up in the town and his powers first manifested there. Eventually his parents revealed his alien origins after Clark used his powers to save his classmates on a flooding bus after it drove off a bridge. In 2013, General Zod and his Kryptonian forces attack Smallville in search of the growth codex.
  - Yorkville, Illinois was used in Batman v Superman: Dawn of Justice, Clark Kent's funeral was held on the Kent farm in Smallville. At the funeral, Martha gave Lois an envelope with an engagement ring which was to be given to her during Clark's proposal. Heartbroken, she wears the engagement ring as she drops a pile of dirt on Clark's casket.
  - In Justice League, Flash and Cyborg were sent to retrieve Clark's body from Smallville. After Clark is brought back to life, he and Lois return to the Kent farm, where Clark fully regains his memories and reunites with Martha Kent.
- Smallville appears in Batman and Superman: Battle of the Super Sons. Years later, Clark Kent and Lois Lane, now married, live in this town, on the farm of the deceased Jonathan and Martha Kent, and raising their son Jon Kent.
- Smallville appears in Superman (2025). After escaping Lex Luthor's pocket dimension, Lois took Superman and Krypto to Smallville so he could recover from kryptonite poisoning, using Mister Terrific's T-Craft.

=== Video games ===
- Smallville appears in DC Universe Online. In the game, Lex Luthor has experimented on its citizens using Exobytes and Doomsday's DNA with Doomsday being trapped in a containment entropy cage in the barn near the Kent Family Farm. Jonathan Kent, Lana Lang, and Pete Ross are among the Smallville citizens that have been transformed into Doomsday-like creatures. Due to the experiments, Smallville has been practically destroyed.
- Smallville appears as a level in Lego DC Super-Villains.

=== Radio ===
The first time in any media that Smallville or the Kent farm were linked to a specific location was in The Adventures of Superman radio show. In the storyline "The Secret Rocket" (9/29/47-10/30/47), mention was made several times that young Clark Kent grew up on Eben Kent's farm in Iowa. The farmtown was unnamed in the story (as the name "Smallville" appeared for the first time two years later in Superboy (volume 1) #2); the nearest town named in the broadcast was the real-life Centerville.

=== Novels ===
- Superman writer Elliot S. Maggin incorporated the Kansas location into the DC Universe in his 1981 Superman novel, Miracle Monday.
- In the novel, It's Superman! by Tom De Haven, which is set in 1938, Smallville is placed in Osage County along U.S. Highway 75.

== Other uses ==
Smallville is also a nickname given to Clark Kent by Lois Lane. Adaptations of the Superman mythos that feature Lois using this nickname include the television series Lois & Clark: The New Adventures of Superman, Superman: The Animated Series, and Smallville.

On June 21, 2013, Hutchinson, Kansas officially changed its name to Smallville for a day, thanks to a campaign started by local residents Ben Eisiminger, KC Mcneely, and Christopher Wietrick. The annual "Smallville Comic Con" has been hosted at the Kansas State Fairgrounds since 2017.
