= The Flash season 5 =

Season of television series

The Flash
- Season 5
- Home media cover
- Showrunner: Todd Helbing
- Starring: Grant Gustin; Candice Patton; Danielle Panabaker; Carlos Valdes; Hartley Sawyer; Danielle Nicolet; Jessica Parker Kennedy; Chris Klein; Tom Cavanagh; Jesse L. Martin
- No. of episodes: 22

Release
- Original network: The CW
- Original release: October 9, 2018 – May 14, 2019

Season chronology
- ← Previous; Season 4 Next → Season 6

The fifth season of the American television series The Flash, which is based on the DC Comics character Barry Allen / Flash, premiered on The CW on October 9, 2018, and concluded on May 14, 2019, with a total of 22 episodes. The season follows Barry dealing with the consequences of his future daughter's time traveling, while confronting a new foe, Orlin Dwyer. It is set in the Arrowverse, sharing continuity with the other television series of the universe, and is a spin-off of Arrow. The season was produced by Berlanti Productions, Warner Bros. Television, and DC Entertainment, with Todd Helbing as showrunner.

The season was ordered in April 2018, and production began that July. Grant Gustin stars as Barry, with principal cast members Candice Patton, Danielle Panabaker, Carlos Valdes, Tom Cavanagh, and Jesse L. Martin also returning from previous seasons, while Hartley Sawyer, Danielle Nicolet, and Jessica Parker Kennedy were promoted to series regulars from their recurring status in season four. They are joined by new cast member Chris Klein while former series regular Keiynan Lonsdale makes a guest appearance. The series was renewed for a sixth season on January 31, 2019.

== Episodes ==
The Flash season 5 episodes
No. overall	No. in season	Title	Directed by	Written by	Original release date	Prod. code	U.S. viewers (millions)
93	1	"Nora"	David McWhirter	Todd Helbing & Sam Chalsen	October 9, 2018	T27.13751	2.08
Team Flash meets Nora, Barry and Iris' daughter from the future. While Iris expresses excitement, Barry is concerned that she could alter the timeline based on his own mistakes with time travel. When Barry tries to send Nora home, Wally reveals that Nora's blood is saturated with negative tachyons, preventing her from using the Speed Force or the Legends' Waverider to time travel. Barry asks Nora what happens to him in the future, so she reveals that he never returned after disappearing in 2024 and that she traveled back in time to meet him. A new metahuman named Gridlock, who is able to harness kinetic energy, causes a plane to fall, so Barry, Nora, Wally, and Cisco team up to save it, with Nora providing Barry a Flash ring suit. They phase the plane through the buildings so it lands safely in the river. While Gridlock is being transported to prison, the convoy is attacked by a masked individual, who tells Gridlock that he plans to wipe out all metahumans before approaching him with a lightning-shaped dagger.
94	2	"Blocked"	C. Kim Miles	Eric Wallace & Judalina Neira	October 16, 2018	T27.13752	1.69
Barry struggles to train the overeager Nora, who gets herself hired as a CSI intern to spend more time with her father, much to Iris' discomfort. Caitlin and Ralph try to help Cisco following his breakup with Gypsy, with Cisco eventually accepting he needs to move on. Caitlin refuses to pursue the idea that her father might still be alive, despite Ralph's insistence. Cecile starts to lose her telepathy and struggles to connect with her child without being able to know her thoughts. Meanwhile, a new meta called "Block," who can create blocks of dense air, steals weapons from her old gang and, while trying to stop her, the team has their first encounter with Cicada, the masked man who killed Gridlock. He stabs Block, but Nora manages to speed her away from the scene. Cicada then uses his dagger, which he has telekinetic control of, to neutralize the team's powers, beat them severely, slash Cisco's hands, and nearly kill Barry before Nora drives him off. Cisco vibes Caitlin, learning that her mother is involved with her father's disappearance. Iris reveals that she has been investigating the masked individual and the team discovers that Nora already knows about him.
95	3	"The Death of Vibe"	Andi Armaganian	Jonathan Butler & Gabriel Garza	October 23, 2018	T27.13753	1.87
The team recruits Harrison Sherloque Wells to help them catch Cicada, who Nora reveals is unstoppable in the future. Caitlin and Ralph confront Caitlin's mother, Carla Tannhauser, who denies forging her husband's death certificate. They later break into her files and find a suicide note from Caitlin's father. Sherloque pinpoints Cicada as David Hersch, as he was previously correct 37 times. As a result of Nora's tampering with the timeline, however, his identity on Earth-1 is different. Cicada attacks Joe to lure out Vibe and, when Cisco arrives, Cicada stabs him and breaks his arm. Barry arrives, but is easily defeated. Nora enacts an explosion to drive Cicada off, which results in Cisco's apparent death. However, Cisco reappears, having used a breach machine to escape. With the public and Cicada believing that Vibe is dead, Sherloque agrees to help the team. Caitlin deciphers a hidden message from her father, Thomas, asking her to come find him. Cicada visits his comatose niece in the hospital. Nora agrees to stay with her parents, despite her seemingly strained relationship with Iris. Sherloque begins to suspect that Nora is not in 2018 for the reasons she gave.
96	4	"News Flash"	Brent Crowell	Kelly Wheeler & Lauren Certo	October 30, 2018	T27.13754	1.75
The team discovers articles about XS written by Iris' former colleagues Spencer Young which are all published just before the events take place. Iris contacts Spencer to ask her to refrain from putting XS in her articles in order to protect Nora, but fails. Spencer is revealed to be in possession of a cell phone that allows her to control the minds of people she texts about so she can create articles for her blog. Iris learns from Nora that she does not like her because in the future, the former implanted her with a meta-dampening chip that disabled her powers. Barry and Nora go to the stadium when a bomb threat is reported. There, Spencer uses her tech to hypnotize XS into trying to kill the Flash. Iris eventually stops XS by shooting her with a tranquilizer dart, allowing Nora to regain her mind and Barry to arrest Spencer while confiscating her cell phone. The team discovers that Spencer's cell phone and Cicada's dagger have meta abilities, created from DeVoe's satellite explosion, meaning meta-tech could be in the hands of anyone. It is later revealed that Cicada has acquired super-strength.
97	5	"All Doll'd Up"	Philip Chipera	Thomas Pound & Sterling Gates	November 13, 2018	T27.13755	1.73
Barry and Nora go to stop some art thieves, with Iris getting frustrated when Nora cuts her off. Nora reveals that, in the future, Iris is cold, distant, and critical of her actions. Nora goes to spend some time with Cecile, finding out more about Iris from her. Later, a new meta called Rag Doll attacks an architect and destroys his office, though the Flash saves him. Iris and Barry try to investigate the new meta, but the latter gets captured by Rag Doll and held hostage on a rooftop with power-dampening cuffs (though the villain is unaware of Barry's abilities). Ralph and Iris go to save Barry, Iris jumping off the building to remove Barry's cuffs while he is falling and allowing him to save them just as Ralph defeats Rag Doll. Iris later reconciles with Nora and the two start to grow closer. Meanwhile, Cisco, Caitlin, Ralph, and Sherloque investigate Caitlin's father and track him to a university office and chem lab before Cisco suddenly collapses. As his damaged hands negatively affect his health while using his powers, Cisco takes control of DeVoe's satellites so he can try and find both Thomas and Cicada.
98	6	"The Icicle Cometh"	Chris Peppe	Kristen Kim & Joshua V. Gilbert	November 20, 2018	T27.13756	1.60
Barry, Cisco, and Caitlin find her father, Thomas, in an arctic facility and bring him to S.T.A.R. Labs, where he reveals that both he and Caitlin developed ice powers as a result of his experiments in trying to treat their ALS gene. Thomas claims he is dying as a result of never having manifested an alternate personality like Killer Frost, but Cisco is suspicious. He returns to Thomas' lab, where he discovers "Thomas" is actually an alternate personality wearing skin grafts to pose as him. Caitlin realizes that a serum she created to cure her father would actually kill his human side. Cornered, Thomas' alter ego, "Icicle", emerges and attempts to kill Team Flash with absolute zero temperatures, but Caitlin proves to be immune. With the rest of the team incapacitated, Killer Frost returns and defeats Icicle, forcing him to flee. Team Flash determines that Dominic Lanse / Brainstorm's powers caused Killer Frost's disappearance and they also learn the name of Cicada's niece, Grace.
99	7	"O Come, All Ye Thankful"	Sarah Boyd	Jonathan Butler & Gabriel Garza	November 27, 2018	T27.13757	1.79
Barry attempts to see Grace, but Cicada's reluctant ally Dr. Ambres impedes him. Barry and Nora later stop a freak lightning storm from hitting Central City's power grid. Team Flash suspects Mark Mardon, even though he's in jail, but Nora and Barry instead encounter his estranged daughter, Joss Jackam / Weather Witch, who wields a weather control staff like her father. Barry and Nora bring Mardon to her in order to appease her, but to no avail. An angered Joss attacks an airport with a lightning tornado, so Barry uses Mardon's wand to absorb Joss' lightning and subdue her. Team Flash finally discovers Cicada's identity: Orlin Dwyer. In flashbacks, Orlin is shown adopting Grace after the death of her parents in a metahuman attack and, while bonding, debris from DeVoe's satellite put Grace in a coma and impaled Orlin with shrapnel that would later become his dagger. Blaming metahumans for what happened, Orlin vowed to exterminate them all on Grace's behalf.
100	8	"What's Past Is Prologue"	Tom Cavanagh	Todd Helbing & Lauren Certo	December 4, 2018	T27.13758	1.78
Barry and Nora time travel to gather items needed to stop Cicada; a highly magnetic alloy from Savitar's armor, Harry Wells' Speed Force transmitter, and dark matter. They first travel to Team Flash's final battle with Savitar. After a Time Wraith appears, Barry distracts it so Nora can retrieve a piece of the armor. They next travel to when Zoom stole Barry's speed for the transmitter, which Barry obtains from Harry. Zoom discovers Barry and Nora and gives chase before he is stopped by the Time Wraith, though this breaks the transmitter in the process. Even though he is reluctant, Nora convinces Barry to ask Eobard Thawne for help. Despite some initial difficulty, Barry convinces Thawne to fix the transmitter by claiming he will never get home if he does not. Finally, Barry and Nora travel to the night of the particle accelerator explosion. In the Time Vault, Gideon reroutes part of the dark matter through the shard and transmitter, and Barry reveals to Nora that Thawne killed his mother. Back in the present, Team Flash separates Cicada from his dagger temporarily before he escapes. Nora returns to 2049 to confront Thawne at Iron Heights.
101	9	"Elseworlds, Part 1"	Kevin Tancharoen	Eric Wallace & Sam Chalsen	December 9, 2018	T27.13759	1.83
On a decimated Earth-90, the Flash is seen crawling towards a book, but a mysterious stranger picks it up and uses it to destroy that reality, though the Flash escapes. On Earth-1, the stranger presents the book to Arkham Asylum psychiatrist Dr. John Deegan and instructs him to rewrite reality as he sees fit. The following morning, under threatening red skies, Oliver Queen and Barry discover that they have swapped lives, with everyone believing they are each other. When they seek the assistance of Team Flash, they are not believed and locked in the pipeline. Barry and Oliver use each other's abilities to escape and convince a reluctant Iris to allow them to flee to Earth-38 to enlist the help of Kara Danvers / Supergirl and her cousin, Clark Kent / Superman. Back on Earth-1, the heroes join forces to stop A.M.A.Z.O., an android that can copy their abilities. They stop the android and, after seeing a vision of the stranger from Cisco, realize they must travel to Gotham City. Note: This episode begins a crossover event that continues on Arrow season 7 episode 9 and concludes on Supergirl season 4 episode 9.
102	10	"The Flash & the Furious"	David McWhirter	Kelly Wheeler & Sterling Gates	January 15, 2019	T27.13760	1.64
Nora refuses to continue working with Thawne upon learning he killed her grandmother. Barry and Nora encounter a new villain, Silver Ghost, who possesses meta tech allowing her to access any car. An encounter with her and her tech leaves Barry phasing uncontrollably, so Nora and Team Flash help him into the pipeline, where he can stabilize for 24 hours. Silver Ghost frees Joss Jackam from CCPD's custody so she can help her steal a WayneTech car in A.R.G.U.S.'s possession. Silver Ghost uses the car's tech to evade capture until Cisco patches Nora's voice into the radio, urging Joss to turn herself in and offering a second chance. Joss secretly disables the car before escaping with Silver Ghost. Caitlin helps heal Cisco's hands and they agree to try to develop a meta cure with the caveat that it is never forced on anyone. Nora returns to the future and reluctantly agrees to help Thawne, who has less than an hour left to live. Sherloque gains access to the Time Vault, but discovers the files on Nora West-Allen have been deleted by her.
103	11	"Seeing Red"	Marcus Stokes	Judalina Neira & Thomas Pound	January 22, 2019	T27.13761	1.88
Cicada returns, killing metahumans from an arrest log provided by someone inside CCPD. When Team Flash tries to stop him, the villain paralyzes Nora and slows down her speed healing. Once the team determines Cicada's pattern, Cecile tracks down the informant while the rest round up the remaining metas on the log. Caitlin continues working on the metahuman cure, but needs blood from a recently created one. Cicada finds the meta group protected by Team Flash. While Ralph helps the metas escape, Flash and Killer Frost distract Cicada, the latter drawing blood from him for the cure. Incensed from what happened to Nora, Flash nearly kills Cicada before she rushes over to stop him, inadvertently allowing the killer to escape. Sherloque ignores Iris' order to stop investigating Nora and discovers two handwriting styles in her journal. While having dinner with Iris and Nora, Barry comes up with the idea to appeal to Cicada's heart by trying to wake up Grace.
104	12	"Memorabilia"	Rebecca Johnson	Sam Chalsen & Kristen Kim	January 29, 2019	T27.13762	2.04
The team plans to wake up Grace using Sherloque's Memory Machine from Earth-221. Against his instructions, Nora enters Grace's memories by herself to prevent the others from learning about her secret alliance with Thawne. To her horror, she discovers that Grace is consciously aware of Orlin's actions and wholeheartedly supports him in his anti-metahuman agenda before being attacked by a female version of Cicada. Meanwhile, Barry and Iris discover what Nora did and go in after her, only to end up in her memories of the Flash Museum and attacked by the Reverse-Flash exhibit. Despite heavy resistance, Barry and Iris manage to escape Nora's memories and save her from Cicada, but they are unable to bring Grace, as she refuses to wake up and believes Nora is a liar. Upon further review of their adventure, Caitlin learns that a satellite shard became lodged in Grace's brain and created a barrier around it, meaning they cannot try again. Iris establishes the Central City Citizen, which Nora reveals was originally founded in 2021, meaning Iris is changing the future. Cisco makes some headway on the meta cure, which Barry decides to use on Cicada.
105	13	"Goldfaced"	Alexandra LaRoche	Jonathan Butler & Gabriel Garza	February 5, 2019	T27.13763	1.89
Team Flash completes the metahuman cure, but requires Cicada to hold still long enough for it to take effect. Ralph finds a device capable of doing so in the hands of a metahuman crime boss called Goldface. Despite Barry's hesitation, he and Ralph go undercover as criminals to retrieve it from him. Though he is suspicious, Goldface decides to take the heroes on a job to steal a 3D printer from Ivo Labs in exchange for the device. Even though they are discovered, Barry and Ralph are able to stop Goldface and his men. Elsewhere, Iris starts investigating Cicada for the Central City Citizen and discovers where he lives. She is able to get inside, but he sees through her and tries to kill her. After a protracted fight, she discovers his weakness but, when Team Flash investigates, they find Cicada gone. Under orders from Thawne, Nora tries to steer Sherloque away from her by helping him fall in love with a woman named Renee Adler. Despite a bad first meeting, Sherloque and Renee eventually fall for each other. After discovering she is a meta, Sherloque devotes all of his attention to protecting her from Cicada.
106	14	"Cause and XS"	Rachel Talalay	Todd Helbing & Jeff Hersh	February 12, 2019	T27.13764	1.71
Barry takes the meta cure into the Speed Force for an hour to help speed up the synthesizing process, leaving an uneasy Nora behind. Elsewhere, Cicada kidnaps Iris, but she manages to alert Nora and Killer Frost to her location. They arrive, but Cicada slays Killer Frost, distressing Nora to the point where she runs so fast that she resets the timeline. When Nora tries to prevent Iris' death, Cicada ends up kidnapping Sherloque instead and, although the situation plays out like last time, Cisco dies this time. Nora repeatedly resets the timeline but, on each new attempt, at least one person on Team Flash always gets killed. Eventually, Cisco reveals the loops to the team, forcing Nora to confess what has happened. Cisco consoles her and, together with the rest of the team, works on a new plan to stop Cicada. This time, they make it so that Cicada accidentally stabs himself with his dagger, forcing him to flee. Once Barry returns and learns what Nora has done, he warns her against altering time any further. Elsewhere, Sherloque manages to decode Nora's entire journal using symbols she unwittingly revealed during the meeting with the team.
107	15	"King Shark vs. Gorilla Grodd"	Stefan Pleszczynski	Eric Wallace & Lauren Certo	March 5, 2019	T27.13765	1.67
With the metahuman cure finally finished, Team Flash decides that King Shark would be the ideal test subject. The team travels to A.R.G.U.S. and asks Lyla to get in contact with King Shark, who aggressively attacks the team while under Gorilla Grodd's mind control. Barry reacts by injecting the cure into King Shark, turning him back into his human form – Shay Lamden. Back at S.T.A.R. Labs, Caitlin discovers that, although the cure worked, there is still dark matter in Shay's pituitary gland, causing his body to rapidly change back and forth between his two forms. Shay's wife Tanya is convinced by Sherloque to talk with Shay. Later that night, Grodd controls Cisco and Caitlin so he can steal Dr. Lamden's telepathy crown and amplify his powers, enabling him to control all of Central City. Seeing no other option and wanting to make amends for his crimes as King Shark, Shay volunteers to change back to help Team Flash stop Grodd, in spite of the possibility that he may never be human again. Meanwhile, Joe returns home to Cecile and trains Iris to overcome Cicada, to whom Barry suggests they offer the cure instead of forcing it on him.
108	16	"Failure Is an Orphan"	Viet Nguyen	Zack Stentz	March 12, 2019	T27.13766	1.55
In 2049, Thawne warns Nora that they have to act fast to stop Cicada once and for all, because a new timeline is trying to push its way into being, bringing something really big with it. In the present, Nora and Barry confront a new metahuman named Acid Master whose burn mark was on a newspaper article shown to Nora in the future, leading her to deduce that the final confrontation with Cicada is upon them. Meanwhile, Joe and Cecile interrogate Dr. Ambres about working with Orlin. She then reveals to them that Grace is a metahuman now. When Barry tells Orlin, he reconsiders his vendetta and is convinced to take the metahuman cure because of the possibility of curing Grace. Orlin is taken to S.T.A.R. Labs and given the cure but, during the operation, the facility is attacked by a new Cicada who gains control of Orlin's dagger and uses it to kill Dr. Ambres before abducting Orlin. At a cabin in the woods, the new Cicada unmasks herself to reveal an adult Grace.
109	17	"Time Bomb"	Rob Greenlea	Kristen Kim & Sterling Gates	March 19, 2019	T27.13767	1.64
In 2049, Thawne is surprised by the appearance of the new Cicada and, with no other options, asks Nora to reveal the relationship between them to her father. The adult Grace reveals to Orlin that she came from a future where metahumans thrive so that she can complete what she believes is still his mission. Team Flash discovers that the new Cicada arrived in a Time Sphere, stolen from S.T.A.R. Labs' storage in the future. Following some leads, including a police file stolen by the new Cicada, they correctly deduce her identity. Cicada II targets Vickie Bolen, the metahuman who accidentally caused the explosion that killed her parents, but Team Flash intervenes. Orlin arrives and tries to talk his niece into abandoning her vendetta, which leads to her killing him. Meanwhile, Sherloque finds out that Thawne, when he was posing as Dr. Wells, cracked a source code for the multiverse. Identifying Thawne as the second person who wrote in Nora's journal, Sherloque exposes her partnership in front of the team, causing Barry to lock his daughter in the pipeline.
110	18	"Godspeed"	Danielle Panabaker	Judalina Neira & Kelly Wheeler	April 16, 2019	T27.13768	1.31
Team Flash reads Nora's journal and learns that she discovered her powers and relation to the Flash after subsequent encounters with two speedsters: August Heart / Godspeed and Thawne. Flash-forwards show Nora working as a forensic scientist like her father. After being hit by Godspeed, Nora discovers she had a chip implanted into her that dampened her powers, causing a rift between her and her mother. After Godspeed's citywide rampage kills Nora's best friend and co-worker Lia, Thawne helps Nora control her newfound powers and defeat the rampaging speedster, after which he becomes her mentor as he was for Barry. With Thawne's help, Nora finds the Time Vault, where she learns that her father was the Flash. In the present, Iris releases Nora out of guilt after learning of her future self's deception, but Barry sends her back to her time out of distrust, stating that he would be able to sense any future attempts made by her to time travel. Barry then visits Thawne at Iron Heights, glad that he is awaiting execution for his crimes.
111	19	"Snow Pack"	Jeff Cassidy	Jonathan Butler & Gabriel Garza	April 23, 2019	T27.13769	1.63
Barry and Iris fight over him sending Nora back without consulting her. Iris reprograms the Time Sphere and travels to 2049, where Nora wants Thawne to teach her to use the Negative Speed Force to time travel without detection. After an unsuccessful attempt, Nora and Thawne are confronted by Iris. Instead of going with her, an angered Nora enters the Negative Speed Force. Thawne admits he made a mistake and tells Iris to reunite her family. Meanwhile, Icicle steals a cryo-atomizer from Tannhauser Industries and kidnaps Caitlin and Carla, planning to eliminate their human sides. Killer Frost fights Icicle while Barry saves Carla from the cryo chamber. Unbeknownst to everyone, the chamber turns Carla into a meta. Before Icicle can kill Caitlin, Thomas finds the strength to return to his human form. Cicada II, who earlier kidnapped her younger self, arrives and fights Killer Frost. Thomas sacrifices himself for his daughter by stepping in front of Cicada's dagger, after which the future villain escapes with the cryo-atomizer. Barry admits he was wrong and agrees to work with Iris to help their daughter. Elsewhere, Nora emerges from the Negative Speed Force with glowing red eyes.
112	20	"Gone Rogue"	Kristin Windell	Sam Chalsen & Joshua V. Gilbert	April 30, 2019	T27.13770	1.37
Nora plans a heist at McCulloch Technologies, who have made weapons from the satellite shrapnel. Needing accomplices who will not be affected by the meta-power dampeners on-site, she recruits Brie Larvan, Rag Doll, and Joss. After getting through the dampeners, Nora's Rogues turn on her and threaten to kill all the employees unless the Flash reveals his identity. While Sherloque distracts the Rogues as a hologram of the Flash, Iris and Joe help the hostages escape and take down Rag Doll while Barry and Nora team up to disable the dampeners and apprehend the others. Nora reveals she was trying to steal a mirror gun capable of destroying Cicada's dagger. She makes amends with her parents and agrees to abandon Thawne's plan. Barry, however, wants to use the gun. Meanwhile, Caitlin and Ralph discover that Cisco's metahuman cure prototypes have been stolen and realize that Cicada II can weaponize a lethal version of the cure with the cryo-atomizer. Elsewhere, Cicada II works on the cryo-atomizer, envisioning her uncle beside her.
113	21	"The Girl with the Red Lightning"	Stefan Pleszczynski	Judalina Neira & Thomas Pound	May 7, 2019	T27.13771	1.45
Team Flash decide to gather Central City's metahumans at CCPD and distribute the cure to protect them against Cicada II. Sherloque goes to get Renee, but she refuses to take it and is sent to safety on his Earth. Nora reveals she is still connected to Grace's mind and feels her anger through the Negative Speed Force. She wants to look through Grace's eyes to locate her, but her parents decide it is too dangerous. Ralph tries to figure out Thawne's plan, but the others are more interested in stopping Cicada II. After Cicada II collects the final pieces for her weapon, Barry and Iris agree to let Nora connect with her and expose herself to the Negative Speed Force. She locates Cicada II just as she attacks CCPD and uses the metas' dark matter as a battery for the cryo-atomizer. While the others engage Cicada II, Cisco disables the cryo-atomizer. Ralph figures out Thawne's plan just as Barry shoots Cicada's dagger with the mirror gun. In 2049, Thawne's time runs out and he is about to be executed. As he is strapped down, it is revealed that his powers are being dampened by Cicada's dagger.
114	22	"Legacy"	Gregory Smith	Story by : Lauren Certo; Teleplay by : Todd Helbing & Eric Wallace	May 14, 2019	T27.13772	1.53
Ralph saves the dagger, which Cicada II reclaims before escaping. After Sherloque explains Thawne's plan, Nora realizes that she was played and comes up with a plan to stop Cicada II without destroying the dagger. Once the team tracks Cicada II to her younger self, Nora enters her mind and convinces her to take the cure. However, the shard in Grace's head counteracts it, so Barry's forced to destroy the dagger anyway; resulting in the adult Grace being erased while in 2049, Thawne regains his powers. The team fights Thawne, with Barry and Nora eventually subduing him. However, the new dagger-less timeline threatens to erase Nora. Thawne escapes after revealing that the only way that Nora will survive is if she reenters the Negative Speed Force. Ultimately, Nora refuses to become like Thawne and is erased while hugging her parents. Sherloque returns to his Earth to find Renee while Cisco takes the cure. Captain Singh gets promoted to chief of police and names Joe as his replacement; revealing that he knows Barry is the Flash. Barry and Iris discover a farewell message from Nora. The date of the Crisis in the future newspaper becomes December 10, 2019.

== Cast and characters ==
=== Main ===
- Grant Gustin as Barry Allen / Flash
- Candice Patton as Iris West-Allen
- Danielle Panabaker as Caitlin Snow / Killer Frost
- Carlos Valdes as Cisco Ramon / Vibe
- Hartley Sawyer as Ralph Dibny / Elongated Man
- Danielle Nicolet as Cecile Horton
- Jessica Parker Kennedy as Nora West-Allen / XS
- Chris Klein as Orlin Dwyer / Cicada
- Tom Cavanagh as Sherloque Wells and Eobard Thawne / Reverse-Flash (Note: Cavanagh also portrays—in a less prominent capacity—Herr Wells of Earth-12 and Harry Wells of Earth-2.)
- Jesse L. Martin as Joe West

=== Recurring ===
- Patrick Sabongui as David Singh
- Lossen Chambers as Vanessa Ambres
- Islie Hirvonen as Grace Gibbons
  - Sarah Carter as adult Grace Gibbons / Cicada II
- Klarc Wilson as Officer "Jonesy" Jones
- Victoria Park as Kamilla Hwang

=== Guest ===
- Keiynan Lonsdale as Wally West / Kid Flash
- Daniel Cudmore as William Lang / Gridlock
- Erin Cummings as Vanessa Jansen / Block
- Matty Finochio as Bruno Moretti
- Susan Walters as Carla Tannhauser
- Kiana Madeira as Spencer Young / Spin
- Kyle Secor as Thomas Snow / Icicle
- Troy James as Peter Merkel / Rag Doll
  - Phil LaMarr voices Rag Doll
- Reina Hardesty as Joslyn "Joss" Jackam / Weather Witch
- Liam McIntyre as Mark Mardon / Weather Wizard
- LaMonica Garrett as Mar Novu / Monitor
- Michelle Harrison as Nora Allen
- John Wesley Shipp as Henry Allen and Barry Allen / Flash of Earth-90
- Teddy Sears as Hunter Zolomon / Zoom
  - Tony Todd voices Zoom
- Stephen Amell as Oliver Queen / Flash
- David Ramsey as John Diggle
- Tyler Hoechlin as Kal-El / Clark Kent / Superman (Earth-38)
- Melissa Benoist as Kara Danvers / Kara Zor-El / Supergirl
- Jeremy Davies as John Deegan
- Elizabeth Tulloch as Lois Lane (Earth-38)
- Gabrielle Walsh as Raya Van Zandt / Silver Ghost
- Britne Oldford as Shawna Baez / Peek-a-Boo
- Kimberly Williams-Paisley as Renee Adler
- Paul McGillion as Earl Cox
- Damion Poitier as Goldface
- Audrey Marie Anderson as Lyla Michaels
- Zibby Allen as Tanya Lamden
- Dan Payne as Shay Lamden / King Shark
  - David Hayter voices King Shark
- David Sobolov voices Gorilla Grodd
- John Gillich as Philip Master / Acid Master
- Catherine Lough Haggquist as Vickie Bolen
- Kathryn Gallagher as Lia
- Kindall Charters as August Heart / Godspeed
  - BD Wong voices Godspeed
- Ese Atawo as Detective Curtis
- Morena Baccarin voices Gideon (uncredited)
- Emily Kinney as Brie Larvan / Bug-Eyed Bandit

== Production ==
=== Development ===
At the Television Critics Association winter press tour in January 2018, The CW president Mark Pedowitz said he was "optimistic" and "confident" about The Flash and the other Arrowverse shows returning next season, but added that it was too soon to announce anything just yet. On April 2, The CW renewed the series for its fifth season. Todd Helbing, who had previously served as a co-showrunner for the series' first four seasons, emerged as the series' first sole showrunner following Andrew Kreisberg's firing during the previous season.

=== Writing ===
In October 2017, Kevin Smith revealed that then-executive producer Andrew Kreisberg already had plans for the next season of the show and had told him the story for The Flash's fifth season, which got Smith very excited and jokingly commenting, "I now have to stay alive one more year".

At San Diego Comic-Con 2018, Todd Helbing revealed that "legacy" would be a theme during the season, adding, "I think everybody's thinking about what it means after they leave". On the arrival of Barry and Iris' future daughter, Nora, Grant Gustin teased the different headspaces the characters would be in. "[Nora]'s kind of attached to [Barry] when she arrives and a little more distant with Iris", Gustin said. "It's a weird thing for Iris to see them bond so easily... obviously something happened in the future, which worries Iris", added Candice Patton. The season also sees Barry, Ralph and Iris returning to their professional careers as a CSI, detective, and journalist, respectively. Patton noted that, "We live in such precarious times where we don't know what the truth is... I feel like [journalists] are superheroes... I hope that's a concept we bring to the show and give journalists the praise they deserve".

Helbing also revealed that there will be "a lot of deaths this season" and that the main antagonist would not be a speedster for a consecutive season. The new antagonist, Cicada, instead possesses powers that "present a challenge for Team Flash that they've never had to deal with before". He is not a cult leader as he is in the comics, but is portrayed as a "grizzled, blue-collar everyman whose family has been torn apart by metahumans" and who views the rise of metas as an epidemic, and seeks to exterminate them one by one.

=== Casting ===
Main cast members Grant Gustin, Candice Patton, Danielle Panabaker, Carlos Valdes and Jesse L. Martin return from previous seasons as Barry Allen / Flash, Iris West, Caitlin Snow / Killer Frost, Cisco Ramon / Vibe and Joe West, respectively. Tom Cavanagh also returned as a series regular, playing a new version of his character Harrison Wells, known as Sherloque Wells. Cavanagh also portrays Herr Wells of Earth-12 in the episode "The Death of Vibe", Harry Wells of Earth-2 in the episode "What's Past Is Prologue" and recurs as Eobard Thawne. Helbing credited the decision of having Cavanagh play Thawne-as-Wells over Matt Letscher as simply Thawne to making sense in a "weird, time travel way" and be applicable to the season's theme of "legacy". The fifth season is the first not to feature Keiynan Lonsdale, who plays Wally West / Kid Flash, as a series regular since his introduction in the second season, following the character's move to Legends of Tomorrow during the previous season and Lonsdale's subsequent departure from that show as well. He appears only in the season premiere. In June 2018, Danielle Nicolet, Hartley Sawyer, and Jessica Parker Kennedy, who recurred during the previous season as Cecile Horton, Ralph Dibny / Elongated Man, and Nora West-Allen, respectively, were promoted to series regulars for the fifth season. Nicolet had additionally guest-starred at the end of the first season and had been recurring in the series since the third season. The season establishes that Nora's alias is XS, making her an amalgamation of Jenni Ognats / XS from DC Comics, and Barry and Iris' daughter in the comics, Dawn Allen. In July, Chris Klein also joined the main cast as Orlin Dwyer / Cicada, the season's main antagonist. Sarah Carter was cast to play an adult Grace Gibbons, who also adopts the Cicada persona.

=== Design ===
The season introduces a new Flash suit, which Todd Helbing described as the series' most "accurate incarnation" of the Flash suit from the comics. The season also introduces Barry's "Flash ring" from the comics. The new suit adopts brighter colors than previous suits – which had maroon overtones – and, unlike prior incarnations, does not have a chin strap.

=== Filming ===
Production for the season began on July 6, 2018, in Vancouver, British Columbia, and concluded on April 10, 2019. Danielle Panabaker made her directorial debut this season. Tom Cavanagh directed the eighth episode of the season, which served as the 100th episode of the series and led into the annual crossover. In October 2018, it was announced that Martin would take a medical leave from the series due to a back injury he sustained over the hiatus. Due to Martin's injury, the majority of his scenes in the first half of the season were shot depicting Joe seated. In January 2019, it was announced that Martin had returned from medical leave and that Joe would return in the fifteenth episode of the season.

=== Arrowverse tie-ins ===
In May 2018, Arrow star Stephen Amell announced at The CW upfronts that the next Arrowverse crossover would feature Batwoman and Gotham City. The crossover "Elseworlds" has launched a 2019 solo series for the character.

== Marketing ==
The main cast of the season as well as executive producer Todd Helbing attended San Diego Comic-Con on July 21, 2018, to promote the season. Starting on September 14, 2018, several billboards advertising Ralph Dibny as a private investigator were seen around Vancouver, the city where the show is filmed.

== Release ==
=== Broadcast ===
The season premiered on The CW in the United States on October 9, 2018. The annual crossover episode swapped time-slots with Supergirl for that week and aired on Sunday, December 9.

=== Home media ===
The season began streaming on Netflix in the United States on May 22, 2019. The season was released on DVD and Blu-ray on August 27, 2019.

== Reception ==
=== Ratings ===
Viewership and ratings per episode of The Flash season 5
No.	Title	Air date	Rating/share (18–49)	Viewers (millions)	DVR (18–49)	DVR viewers (millions)	Total (18–49)	Total viewers (millions)
1	"Nora"	October 9, 2018	0.8/3	2.08	0.6	1.73	1.4	3.80
2	"Blocked"	October 16, 2018	0.7/3	1.69	0.6	1.57	1.3	3.26
3	"The Death of Vibe"	October 23, 2018	0.7/3	1.87	0.6	1.52	1.3	3.39
4	"News Flash"	October 30, 2018	0.7/3	1.75	0.5	1.39	1.2	3.14
5	"All Doll'd Up"	November 13, 2018	0.6/3	1.73	0.7	1.50	1.3	3.23
6	"The Icicle Cometh"	November 20, 2018	0.6/3	1.60	0.7	1.67	1.3	3.27
7	"O Come, All Ye Thankful"	November 27, 2018	0.6/3	1.79	0.6	1.43	1.2	3.22
8	"What's Past Is Prologue"	December 4, 2018	0.7/3	1.78	0.6	1.45	1.3	3.23
9	"Elseworlds, Part 1"	December 9, 2018	0.7/3	1.83	0.7	1.68	1.4	3.51
10	"The Flash & the Furious"	January 15, 2019	0.6/3	1.64	0.6	1.65	1.2	3.29
11	"Seeing Red"	January 22, 2019	0.7/3	1.88	0.6	1.53	1.3	3.41
12	"Memorabilia"	January 29, 2019	0.7/3	2.04	0.5	1.32	1.2	3.36
13	"Goldfaced"	February 5, 2019	0.7/3	1.89	0.6	1.53	1.3	3.42
14	"Cause and XS"	February 12, 2019	0.6/3	1.71	0.5	1.33	1.1	3.04
15	"King Shark vs. Gorilla Grodd"	March 5, 2019	0.6/3	1.67	0.5	1.42	1.1	3.08
16	"Failure Is an Orphan"	March 12, 2019	0.5/3	1.55	0.5	1.27	1.0	2.82
17	"Time Bomb"	March 19, 2019	0.5/3	1.64	0.5	1.30	1.0	2.94
18	"Godspeed"	April 16, 2019	0.5/2	1.31	0.5	1.37	1.0	2.68
19	"Snow Pack"	April 23, 2019	0.6/3	1.63	0.5	1.21	1.1	2.84
20	"Gone Rogue"	April 30, 2019	0.5/3	1.37	0.5	1.25	1.0	2.62
21	"The Girl with the Red Lightning"	May 7, 2019	0.5/3	1.45	0.5	1.17	1.0	2.62
22	"Legacy"	May 14, 2019	0.6/3	1.53	0.5	1.16	1.1	2.69

=== Critical response ===
The review aggregator website Rotten Tomatoes reported a 94% approval rating for the fifth season with an average rating of 7.73/10, based on 294 reviews. The website's consensus reads, "The Flash's fifth season maintains the show's high standard for compelling visuals, chilling villains, and well-scripted moments of humor, but also turns a more focused gaze on the role of family dynamics amongst the increasingly complex characters."

Reviewing for Den of Geek, Mike Cecchini gave the premiere a rating of 4.5/5. He called it "a genuinely special episode" and "an excellent return to form for the series", naming it the best season premiere in the show's history, while directing specific praise to Gustin, Kennedy, and the show's composer Blake Neely. IGN's Jesse Schedeen also praised the addition of Kennedy, but expressed concern over the introduction of yet another speedster character, "especially with certain existing characters continuing to be so poorly served". He gave the episode a rating of 7.4/10, adding, "in a lot of ways, things do seem to be looking up for The Flash. Unfortunately, there are plenty of other reminders that the series has chronic difficulties in juggling its ensemble cast." Chancellor Agard of Entertainment Weekly and Scott Von Doviak of The A.V. Club further praised Kennedy's performance, and gave the premiere a "B+" and "B" grade, respectively, with Agard concluding, "The Flash is now in its fifth season, which means the show's accumulated history is one of its greatest strengths it has. I'm glad it's finding both humorous fun and poignant ways to use it as we head towards the 100th episode."

=== Accolades ===
Awards and nominations for The Flash season 5
Year	Award	Category	Nominee(s)	Result	Ref.
2019	Kids' Choice Awards	Favorite Male TV Star	Grant Gustin	Nominated	
2019	Kids' Choice Awards	Favorite TV Drama	The Flash	Nominated	
2019	BMI Film, TV & Visual Media Awards	BMI Network Television Music Award	Nathaniel Blume and Blake Neely	Won	
2019	Teen Choice Awards	Choice TV Show: Action	The Flash	Nominated	
2019	Teen Choice Awards	Choice TV Actor: Action	Grant Gustin	Nominated	
2019	Teen Choice Awards	Choice TV Actress: Action	Candice Patton	Nominated	
2019	Teen Choice Awards	Choice TV Actress: Action	Danielle Panabaker	Nominated	
2019	Teen Choice Awards	Choice TV Villain	Sarah Carter	Nominated	
2019	Saturn Awards	Best Superhero Television Series	The Flash	Nominated	
2019	Saturn Awards	Best Actor on a Television Series	Grant Gustin	Nominated	
2019	Saturn Awards	Best Actress on a Television Series	Candice Patton	Nominated	
2019	People's Choice Awards	The Sci-Fi/Fantasy Show of 2019	The Flash	Nominated	
2020	Leo Awards	Best Visual Effects in a Dramatic Series	Armen V. Kevorkian, Josh Spivack, Andranik Taranyan, Shirak Agresta, and Marc Lougee (for "King Shark vs. Gorilla Grodd")	Won	
