= What's Past Is Prologue (The Flash) =

- The Flash episode
- Episode no.: Season 5 Episode 8
- Directed by: Tom Cavanagh
- Written by: Todd Helbing; Lauren Certo
- Production code: T27.13758
- Original air date: December 4, 2018

Guest appearances
- LaMonica Garrett as Mar Novu / Monitor; Michelle Harrison as Nora Allen; John Wesley Shipp as Henry Allen and Barry Allen / Flash (Earth-90); Teddy Sears as Hunter Zolomon / Zoom; Tony Todd voices Zoom

Episode chronology
← Previous "O Come, All Ye Thankful"	Next → "Elseworlds, Part 1"
- The Flash season 5

"What's Past Is Prologue" is the eighth episode of the fifth season of the American television series The Flash, based on the DC Comics character Barry Allen / Flash, a crime scene investigator who gains super-human speed, which he uses to fight criminals, including others who have also gained superhuman abilities. It is set in the Arrowverse, sharing continuity with the other television series of the universe, and is a spin-off of Arrow. The episode was written by Todd Helbing and Lauren Certo, directed by Tom Cavanagh, and is the series' 100th episode.

Grant Gustin stars as Barry, and is joined by principal cast members Candice Patton, Danielle Panabaker, Carlos Valdes, Hartley Sawyer, Danielle Nicolet, Jessica Parker Kennedy, Chris Klein, Cavanagh, and Jesse L. Martin. The episode sees Barry and his daughter Nora travel back in time and take a trip down memory lane where they cross paths with several of the show's past speedsters in order to gather some key necessities to stop Cicada. Several recurring guest stars make appearances, including Michelle Harrison, John Wesley Shipp, Teddy Sears, and Tony Todd. Shipp also reprises his role as Barry Allen / Flash from the 1990 television series in a pre-credits scene that ties-in with the Arrowverse crossover "Elseworlds".

"What's Past Is Prologue" originally aired on The CW on December 4, 2018, and was watched by 1.78 million viewers according to Nielsen Media Research. The episode received a positive critical response.

== Plot ==
Barry Allen and Nora West-Allen travel back in time to gather several items to create a power dampener to stop Cicada: a highly magnetic alloy from Savitar's armor, Harry Wells' Speed Force transmitter, and dark matter. They first travel to Barry's final battle against Savitar. (Note: As depicted in the season three episode "Finish Line".) Despite the intervention of a Time Wraith, they manage to retrieve a piece of the armor. They next travel to when Hunter Zolomon stole Barry's speed with the transmitter, (Note: As depicted in the season two episode "Versus Zoom".) which Barry obtains from Harry. As Barry and Nora attempt to travel back to the night of the particle accelerator explosion, (Note: As depicted in the pilot episode.) Zolomon discovers them and gives chase before being stopped by a Time Wraith, causing Barry and Nora to land on the day that Barry's 2016 self went back in order to get faster instead. (Note: As depicted in the season two episode "Flashback".)

Nora convinces a reluctant Barry to ask Eobard Thawne for help in repairing the transmitter, which was damaged during their landing. Thawne ultimately fixes the transmitter after Barry threatens to disrupt his plans. Barry and Nora travel to the night that the particle accelerator exploded to collect the dark matter released and complete the power dampener. Barry reveals to Nora that Thawne killed his mother, and they subsequently hide the dampener inside a hospital's pillar before returning to the present so they can confront Cicada there. Cisco Ramon separates Cicada from his dagger with the dampener only for the latter to re-summon it. As Cicada prepares to kill Barry, Caitlin Snow transforms into Killer Frost and subdues him, forcing him to flee.

Meanwhile, Sherloque Wells continues to investigate Nora's true intentions for being in 2018 by translating the strange symbols in her journal, which Nora claims that she created in order to keep track of changes to the timeline. Sherloque returns the journal but hides an already deciphered message that reads, "The timeline is malleable." Later, Nora travels to Iron Heights Penitentiary in 2049 to confront Thawne, to whom she has secretly been sending her journal entries.

In a pre-credits scene, the Flash of Earth-90 fails to stop a mysterious individual (Note: Identified off-screen as Mar Novu / Monitor.) from using a powerful book to destroy his universe and is forced to run.

== Production ==
=== Development and writing ===
At the 2018 San Diego Comic-Con, it was announced that the eighth episode of The Flash's fifth season and the series' 100th episode would not be taking place during the annual Arrowverse crossover event like had been the case with the previous seasons' eighth episodes. The Arrowverse showrunners "flipflopped" the placement of the crossover in order to make the milestone 100th episode separate, with the ninth episode being part of the crossover instead. Cast member Tom Cavanagh was also revealed to be directing the episode. Executive producer and showrunner Todd Helbing said the episode will act as a sort of midseason finale and be "a little bit different," with "a big twist to carry us over".

Ahead of the premiere of the fifth season, Helbing explained that "[they] wanted to do something special" for the episode by "taking the audience on a trip to remind everybody of all the cool stuff we've done for five years now. We wanted to relive the coolest moments on our show, so we came up this concept and it both honors what we've done so far and also propels the show for the rest of the season." Cast member Candice Patton also commented that the episode "kind of really revisits what makes our show special" and "there are a lot of special things happening in [the] episode". At the end of October 2018, Tony Todd, who voiced Zoom in the second season, revealed the episode would feature "all the [past] speedster villains" returning "wanting a piece of Barry".

In mid-November 2018, The CW announced that the episode was titled "What's Past is Prologue", written by Helbing and Lauren Certo, and released the synopsis revealing that Barry and Nora would be travelling back in time to "gather some key necessities" to stop Cicada. The episode's title was taken from a line in William Shakespeare's play The Tempest. Two weeks later, Jessica Parker Kennedy revealed that in the episode Nora gets to see a special moment between her mom and dad "that like really breaks her heart". Patton added, "She gets to see Barry and Iris as we've known to love them over the past four seasons," with Parker Kennedy concluding that "the episode really brings the three of them closer." Grant Gustin said the episode "felt like Back to the Future style time travel, seeing ourselves see ourselves in these other moments through a new lens. It was really cool."

=== Casting ===
Main cast members Grant Gustin, Candice Patton, Danielle Panabaker, Carlos Valdes, Hartley Sawyer, Danielle Nicolet, Jessica Parker Kennedy, Chris Klein, Tom Cavanagh, and Jesse L. Martin appear in the episode as Barry Allen / Flash, Iris West-Allen, Caitlin Snow / Killer Frost, Cisco Ramon / Vibe, Ralph Dibny / Elongated Man, Cecile Horton, Nora West-Allen / XS, Orlin Dwyer / Cicada, Sherloque Wells and Joe West, respectively. Gustin also plays Savitar. Cavanagh also plays Harry Wells of Earth-2 and Eobard Thawne / Reverse-Flash. Martin appears in the episode only in archived footage due to a back injury he sustained prior to the start of filming of the season.

When interviewed by Entertainment Weekly after the episode's release, Helbing revealed that early versions of the episode had intended to see Rick Cosnett reprising his first season role as Eddie Thawne, but scheduling conflicts with the episode's tight filming schedule prevented Cosnett from returning. Helbing also hinted that, had it not been for potential scheduling conflicts, the crew would have liked to bring Tom Felton and Shantel VanSanten back as Julian Albert / Doctor Alchemy and Patty Spivot respectively, in addition to possibly having a longer scene for Teddy Sears as Zoom.

LaMonica Garrett as Mar Novu / Monitor and John Wesley Shipp as Barry Allen / Flash from the 1990 television series appear in a pre-credits scene. Shipp also briefly appears as Henry Allen.

=== Filming ===
Filming of the episode began on September 26, 2018, and concluded by early October. Gustin thought it was great that they were able to have Cavanagh direct the episode, saying "[Cavanagh] took such good care; he understands the journey... we've found a lot of details that probably wouldn't have been found otherwise."

=== Arrowverse tie-ins ===
In November 2018, it was revealed that the eighth episodes of The Flash, Arrow, and Supergirl would feature "puzzling events" that lead to the events of the annual Arrowverse crossover event, titled "Elseworlds". A pre-credits scene teasing the events of crossover aired at the end of The Flash's "What's Past Is Prologue", Arrow's "Unmasked", and Supergirl's "Bunker Hill". The scene also confirmed Earth-90 as the earth for the Flash from the 1990 television series. Marc Guggenheim, who acted as the showrunner for the crossover, felt the tease was "cool because we've never... setup the crossover in the previous episodes before." The tease was meant to be one of two options for the "Elseworlds" cold opening. The writers could not choose which they wanted to use, with Guggenheim explaining someone decided to "take one cold open, move that and make that the post-credit tag, like the way The Flash typically does, at the end of all three shows, and then have the other cold open at the beginning of hour one." Supergirl co-showrunner Robert Rovner added that the tease was only supposed to air with The Flash's eighth episode, before being added to the other two episodes to make things easier for viewers since they "are coming to [the crossover] from our separate shows and we wanted something that [connects them together]."

== Release ==
"What's Past is Prologue" was first aired in the United States on The CW on December 4, 2018. It became available for streaming on Netflix in Canada on December 6, 2018, while it was first aired in the United Kingdom on Sky One on December 6, as well.

== Reception ==
=== Ratings ===
In the United States, the episode received a 0.7/3 percent share among adults between the ages of 18 and 49, meaning that it was seen by 0.7 percent of all households, and 3 percent of all of those watching television at the time of the broadcast. It was watched by 1.78 million viewers. The episode improved 17% in the 18–49 rating on the previous episode, "O Come, All Ye Thankful".

The episode attracted a total of 644,700 viewers within seven-days of its British premiere, making it the most watched programme on Sky One for the week.

=== Critical response ===
The review aggregator website Rotten Tomatoes reported a 93% approval rating for the episode, based on 14 reviews, with an average rating of 8.31/10. The website's critical consensus reads, "'What's Past is Prologue' takes viewers on a Flash-tastic journey back in time with a series of flashbacks that make for an eventful, charming, and commemorative 100th episode." Jesse Schedeen of IGN gave the episode a rating of 6.7/10, with the verdict being "As exciting as it is to see The Flash celebrate its 100th episode, [it] didn't fully realize its potential. The time travel premise worked whenever the focus remained on Harrison Wells, but too much of this material played out as if Barry and Nora were watching a clip show of past seasons."
