= Godspeed (The Flash episode) =

- The Flash episode
- Episode no.: Season 5 Episode 18
- Directed by: Danielle Panabaker
- Written by: Judalina Neira; Kelly Wheeler
- Production code: T27.13768
- Original air date: April 16, 2019

Guest appearances
- Kathryn Gallagher as Lia; BD Wong voices Godspeed

Episode chronology
← Previous "Time Bomb"	Next → "Snow Pack"
- The Flash (season 5)

"Godspeed" is the eighteenth episode of the fifth season of the American television series The Flash, based on the DC Comics character Barry Allen / Flash, a crime scene investigator who gains superhuman speed, which he uses to fight criminals, including others who have also gained superhuman abilities. It is set in the Arrowverse, sharing continuity with the other television series of the universe, and is a spin-off of Arrow. The episode was written by Judalina Neira and Kelly Wheeler, and is the directorial debut of Danielle Panabaker.

Grant Gustin stars as Barry, and is joined by principal cast members Candice Patton, Panabaker, Carlos Valdes, Hartley Sawyer, Danielle Nicolet, Jessica Parker Kennedy, Tom Cavanagh, and Jesse L. Martin. The episode focuses on the aftermath of Nora West-Allen's partnership with Eobard Thawne being exposed to Team Flash, and flashbacks showing how the two initially met. BD Wong voices the title character in a guest role.

"Godspeed" originally aired on The CW on April 16, 2019, and was watched by a total of 1.31 million viewers. The episode received positive reviews from critics, although some criticized the treatment of the title character as a "one-off" villain.

== Plot ==
In flashforwards to 2049, Nora West-Allen is a forensic scientist working with her best friend and colleague Lia. Together, they discover a mysterious speedster — whom Lia dubs Godspeed — is stealing chemicals from various laboratories. While Nora and Lia investigate a potential target, Godspeed hits Nora with lightning, exposing her own speedster abilities. Initially believing Godspeed was responsible for her powers, Lia finds traces of a power dampening chip, revealing Nora was a speedster since birth and that it was implanted by her mother Iris West-Allen, which soon causes an argument between them. Later, Nora and Lia discover Godspeed's next target is Stagg Industries. Nora tries to fight Godspeed on even footing, but her inexperience with her powers allows Godspeed to steal what he wanted and kill Lia in the process.

After some investigation, Nora learns Godspeed is August Heart, a former intern from Mercury Labs, and that he is stealing chemicals to create an everlasting version of Velocity 9, a drug that was previously used by speedsters Zoom and Trajectory to give them more speed. Nora realizes the only person who can help her is Eobard Thawne, who is incarcerated at Iron Heights. Thawne initially refuses to help Nora, but she eventually manages to convince him; allowing her to defeat Godspeed and avenge Lia. Nora celebrates her first victory with Thawne, who tells her to find S.T.A.R. Labs' Time Vault to learn her father's true secret. At the vault, she discovers that her father Barry Allen was the Flash and Barry's final message to her before his assumed death.

In the present, Team Flash has been reading Nora's journal. After realizing Lia was murdered, Iris releases Nora from the cell she was imprisoned in by Barry after her partnership with Thawne was exposed, allowing her to tell her side of the story and give her a second chance. Barry however, takes Nora back to 2049 without consulting his team and orders her to never return to the present. He then confronts Thawne, who is awaiting execution for his crimes.

== Production ==
=== Development ===
In July 2018, it was announced that Danielle Panabaker, who plays Caitlin Snow on The Flash, would be making her directorial debut with an episode of the fifth season. That was later revealed to be "Godspeed", the season's eighteenth episode. It was written by Judalina Neira and Kelly Wheeler. To learn the basics of directing, Panabaker attended a course at the Warner Bros Television Directors' Workshop.

=== Casting ===
Main cast members Grant Gustin, Candice Patton, Danielle Panabaker, Carlos Valdes, Hartley Sawyer, Danielle Nicolet, Jessica Parker Kennedy, Tom Cavanagh, and Jesse L. Martin appear in the episode as Barry Allen / Flash, Iris West, Caitlin Snow, Cisco Ramon, Ralph Dibny, Cecile Horton, Nora West-Allen, Sherloque Wells and Joe West, respectively. Cavanagh also portrays Eobard Thawne.

The guest cast includes Kathryn Gallagher as Nora's colleague Lia, and BD Wong as the voice of the titular villain Godspeed. Kindall Charters portrays August Heart, the character's civilian form.

=== Filming ===
Filming for the episode began on February 12, 2019, and ended by February 26.

== Release ==
"Godspeed" first aired in the United States on The CW on April 16, 2019.

== Reception ==
=== Ratings ===
In the United States, the episode received a 0.5/2 percent share among adults between the ages of 18 and 49, meaning that it was seen by 0.5 percent of all households, and 2 percent of all of those watching television at the time of the broadcast. It was watched by a total of 1.31 million viewers.

The episode attracted a total of 517,600 viewers within seven-days of its British premiere, making it the 5th most watched programme on Sky One for the week.

=== Critical response ===
The review aggregator website Rotten Tomatoes reported a 91% approval rating for the episode, based on 11 reviews, with an average rating of 8.1/10. The website's critical consensus reads, "The West-Allen family faces a shocking development in "Godspeed," an episode that reaches new emotional heights under the thoughtful direction of cast member Danielle Panabaker."

Jesse Schedeen of IGN gave the episode 7.6 out of 10. He reacted negatively to the onscreen treatment of Godspeed, saying that the episode underused its title character and turned him into a "throwaway, one-off villain", whereas he is much more three-dimensional in the comics. Despite this criticism, Schedeen enjoyed the main storyline involving Nora, as well as her interactions with Thawne, and felt the episode captured the essence of the show's first season, being "fun and simpl[e]". Mike Cecchini of Den of Geek too did not like the treatment of Godspeed as a "one-off" villain but said, "This was an excellent hour of The Flash, and one that I really hope is enough to shake the show completely out of the rather safe rut it has been in for much of the season." He was particularly appreciative of the performances of Gustin as Barry, and Cavanagh as both Thawne and Sherloque.
