= Elseworlds (Arrowverse) =

Arrowverse crossover event

- Arrowverse crossover event
- Promotional poster

Part 1: The Flash
- Episode title: "Elseworlds, Part 1"
- Episode no.: Season 5 Episode 9
- Directed by: Kevin Tancharoen
- Written by: Eric Wallace; Sam Chalsen
- Production code: T27.13759
- Original air date: December 9, 2018

Episode chronology
← Previous "What's Past Is Prologue"	Next → "The Flash & the Furious"
- The Flash season 5

Part 2: Arrow
- Episode title: "Elseworlds, Part 2"
- Episode no.: Season 7 Episode 9
- Directed by: James Bamford
- Story by: Caroline Dries
- Teleplay by: Marc Guggenheim
- Production code: T27.13659
- Original air date: December 10, 2018

Episode chronology
← Previous "Unmasked"	Next → "My Name Is Emiko Queen"
- Arrow season 7

Part 3: Supergirl
- Episode title: "Elseworlds, Part 3"
- Episode no.: Season 4 Episode 9
- Directed by: Jesse Warn
- Story by: Marc Guggenheim
- Teleplay by: Derek Simon; Robert Rovner
- Production code: T13.21209
- Original air date: December 11, 2018

Episode chronology
← Previous "Bunker Hill"	Next → "Suspicious Minds"
- Supergirl season 4

Crossover chronology
- Preceded by: Crisis on Earth-X
- Followed by: Crisis on Infinite Earths

"Elseworlds" is the fifth Arrowverse crossover event that features episodes of The Flash, Arrow, and Supergirl on The CW. The crossover event began on December 9, 2018, with The Flash, continued on Arrow on December 10, and concluded on Supergirl on December 11. "Elseworlds" introduces the characters Batwoman and Lois Lane, and the fictional Gotham City, to the universe. In the crossover, Green Arrow, Flash, and Supergirl, the former two having had their powers and lives switched, are drawn to Gotham City to confront Dr. John Deegan over his work at Arkham Asylum.

The crossover was confirmed in May 2018 at The CW's upfront presentation, where the inclusion of Batwoman and Gotham City were revealed. Throughout August and September that year, casting for the crossover—including Ruby Rose as Batwoman, Elizabeth Tulloch as Lois Lane, and the announcement that Tyler Hoechlin would return as Superman—was revealed. The title of the crossover was announced at the end of September and filming began in October 2018. In "Elseworlds", Arrowverse actors portray other roles and John Wesley Shipp reprises his role as Barry Allen / Flash from the 1990 series The Flash. The conclusion of "Elseworlds" set up "Crisis on Infinite Earths" as the next crossover, which aired between December 2019 and January 2020.

== Plot ==
=== Part 1 ===
On a ravaged Earth-90, The Flash escapes the planet’s destruction while a mysterious figure uses a powerful book. On Earth-1, the same figure gives the book to Arkham Asylum psychiatrist John Deegan, who uses it to rewrite reality according to his will. The following day, Oliver Queen and Barry Allen wake up in each other's lives. Team Flash does not believe them and locks them up in the S.T.A.R. Labs pipeline. Oliver and Barry use each other's abilities to escape and travel to Earth-38 to get help from Kara Danvers and acquaint themselves with her cousin Clark Kent and Lois Lane, in Smallville, Kansas. Meanwhile, an android called A.M.A.Z.O. awakens and threatens Central City. Cisco Ramon retrieves Oliver and Barry from Earth-38, with Kara and Clark helping. After defeating A.M.A.Z.O., Clark returns to protect Earth-38. Cisco vibes Deegan and the mysterious figure, who sees Cisco using his powers and warns the group that something is coming and they will not be able to stop it. Oliver realizes the figure and Deegan were located in Gotham City.

=== Part 2 ===
In Gotham, Barry, Oliver and Kara are arrested by the GCPD. They are bailed out by Wayne Enterprises' CEO Kate Kane, who tells them Deegan is at Arkham Asylum. The trio, with the assistance of Caitlin and Diggle, break into Arkham to confront Deegan. They retrieve the "Book of Destiny" but Deegan escapes by causing a mass breakout. During a confrontation with inmate Nora Fries, Barry and Oliver are exposed to fear gas and believe each other to be Malcolm Merlyn and Eobard Thawne, respectively. After stopping the breakout, Kate, as the vigilante Batwoman, rouses them from their hallucinatory state and tells them to leave Gotham. They head to A.R.G.U.S. to restore reality, where Earth-90's Flash warns them about Mar Novu, who is testing worlds for an impending crisis. They confront Novu, who breaches away Earth-90's Flash, reclaims the book and returns it to Deegan, who writes a new reality in which Barry and Oliver are powerless criminals known as the Trigger Twins and are confronted by a black-suited Superman.

=== Part 3 ===
Oliver realizes the Superman impostor is actually Deegan before forcing him to save innocents while they escape to find Cisco. Deegan and his forces, including the Earth-1 doppelgänger of Kara's adoptive sister Alex Danvers, are holding Kara at S.T.A.R. Labs. Barry and Oliver locate Cisco and persuade him to take them to Earth-38. They find Clark, who agrees to return with them to Earth-1 while Kara persuades Alex to release her. Arriving on Earth-1, Clark and Oliver fight Deegan and his forces while Alex, Barry, and Kara locate the Book of Destiny in the Time Vault and take it to Clark, who restores Barry, Oliver, and Kara to their real selves. Deegan retrieves the book and attempts to rewrite reality again. To impede his progress, Barry and Kara slow down time by speeding around the Earth in opposite directions. Oliver confronts Novu, asking him to spare Barry and Kara, but Novu demands something from Oliver in exchange. Clark, joined by Lois, Brainiac 5, and J'onn J'onzz, fights Deegan and a revived A.M.A.Z.O. Barry and Kara are nearly torn apart by their speed but Oliver shoots the book with an arrow enhanced by Novu. Deegan reverts to himself, though heavily disfigured, and reality is restored. After returning to Earth-38, Clark and Lois tell Kara they are expecting a child and will return to Argo City, leaving Earth's protection to her. On Earth-1, Oliver is contacted by Kate, who says Deegan, now incarcerated at Arkham, has made a new friend who tells Deegan: "Worlds will live, worlds will die, and the universe will never be the same".

== Cast and characters ==
=== Main and recurring ===
Main and recurring characters appearing in "Elseworlds"
Actor	Character	Episode		
Actor	Character	The Flash	Arrow	Supergirl
Grant Gustin	Barry Allen / Flash	Main	Guest	Guest
Grant Gustin	Oliver Queen / Green Arrow	Main	Guest	Guest
Candice Patton	Iris West-Allen	Main		
Danielle Panabaker	Caitlin Snow / Killer Frost	Main	Guest	Guest
Carlos Valdes	Cisco Ramon / Vibe	Main	Guest	Guest
Hartley Sawyer	Ralph Dibny / Elongated Man	Main		
Tom Cavanagh	"Sherloque" Wells	Main		
Tom Cavanagh	Eobard Thawne / Reverse-Flash		Guest	
Stephen Amell	Oliver Queen / Green Arrow	Guest	Main	Guest
Stephen Amell	Barry Allen / Flash	Guest	Main	Guest
David Ramsey	John Diggle	Guest	Main	Guest
Tyler Hoechlin	Clark Kent / Superman	Guest		Guest
Tyler Hoechlin	John Deegan / Superman		Guest	Guest
Melissa Benoist	Kara Danvers / Supergirl	Guest	Guest	Main
Jeremy Davies	John Deegan	Guest	Guest	Guest
LaMonica Garrett	Mar Novu / Monitor	Guest	Guest	Guest
Elizabeth Tulloch	Lois Lane	Guest		Guest
Emily Bett Rickards	Felicity Smoak		Main	
Echo Kellum	Curtis Holt		Main	
Kirk Acevedo	Ricardo Diaz		Main	
Ruby Rose	Kate Kane / Batwoman	Uncredited cameo	Guest	Guest
Bob Frazer	Roger Hayden / Psycho-Pirate		Guest	Guest
Cassandra Jean Amell	Nora Fries		Guest	Guest
John Wesley Shipp	Barry Allen / Flash (Earth-90)	Uncredited cameo	Guest	
Mehcad Brooks	James Olsen (Earth-1)			Main
Chyler Leigh	Alex Danvers (Earth-1)			Main
Jesse Rath	Querl "Brainy" Dox / Brainiac 5			Main
David Harewood	J'onn J'onzz / Martian Manhunter			Main

Despite being credited, Jesse L. Martin does not appear in The Flash episode; Rick Gonzalez, Juliana Harkavy, Colton Haynes, Sea Shimooka and Katie Cassidy do not appear in the Arrow episode; and Katie McGrath, Sam Witwer, Nicole Maines, and April Parker Jones do not appear in the Supergirl episode.

=== Guests ===
- Liam Hall as Kane Wolfman (Arrow)
- John Barrowman as Malcolm Merlyn (Arrow)
- Adam Tsekhman as Gary Green (Supergirl)

== Production ==
=== Development ===
Coming off "Crisis on Earth-X", the previous year's crossover, executive producer Marc Guggenheim noted that the process to pull off that crossover had made each series' crews "pretty burned out", with them "feeling the effects of it literally a year after". This led the producers to want to take a year off from the yearly crossovers, but were convinced by The CW to create another when they allowed the crossover to not be with all four series as "Crisis on Earth-X" had been. In May 2018, The CW president Mark Pedowitz and Arrow lead Stephen Amell announced at The CW's upfront presentation that Batwoman, fighting alongside the other Arrowverse heroes, would be introduced in the upcoming crossover. The fictional Gotham City would also appear. Despite the inclusion of the character and city, the crossover would not include the television series Gotham that airs on Fox. That July, The CW was planning a potential standalone Batwoman series after her appearance in the crossover; Caroline Dries, who was creating and writing the potential Batwoman series, was expected to consult on the crossover. It was confirmed that Legends of Tomorrow would not feature in the crossover. Legends of Tomorrow co-showrunner Phil Klemmer said because the crossover was being used to launch the Batwoman-led series, "it just became over capacity", and that because Legends of Tomorrow would have a 16-episode season, the crossover would have been "a tonal speed-bump, or a departure, and we just don't have time to step away from our story this year". Despite not being part of the official crossover, Legends of Tomorrow co-showrunner Keto Shimizu revealed "Legends of To-Meow-Meow", the show's episode airing the week of the crossover, would be "crossing over with ourselves" through the use of alternate time periods, and Adam Tsekhman guest stars as Gary Green in the Supergirl episode.

At the end of September 2018, the title of the crossover was announced as "Elseworlds", sharing the name of the Elseworlds imprint of comics from DC Comics that takes place outside the DC Universe canon. The producers initially considered titling it "Identity Crisis" but abandoned the idea because, according to Guggenheim, this title would be "false advertising, because we're obviously not doing the Brad Meltzer, Rags Morales Identity Crisis story".

=== Writing ===
The story for "Elseworlds" was created by Greg Berlanti, the executive producers and writers from each series, Geoff Johns, and Dries. Arrow showrunner Beth Schwartz referred to these people as "the Super Writers' Room", and noted that Marc Guggenheim, who was a consultant on Arrow's seventh season, had "taken the lead on the crossover", acting as the showrunner for it. The Flash episode was written by Eric Wallace and Sam Chalsen, the Arrow episode features a story by Caroline Dries and a teleplay by Marc Guggenheim, and the Supergirl episode features a story by Marc Guggenheim and a teleplay by Derek Simon and Robert Rovner. The episodes' scripts were completed by mid-September 2018. Guggenheim said "Elseworlds" would have a long-lasting impact for the Arrowverse and "lays the groundwork for next year's crossover". At the conclusion of "Elseworlds", it was revealed that the next crossover would be "Crisis on Infinite Earths" in late 2019, adapting the storyline from the comic of the same name.

The preceding episodes of each series feature "puzzling events" that lead to the events of the crossover. The same end-credits scene teasing the events of crossover was shown at the end of the episodes "Bunker Hill", "Unmasked", and "What's Past Is Prologue". The scene also confirmed Earth-90 as the earth for the Flash from the 1990 television series. Guggenheim said the tease was "cool because we've never ... setup the crossover in the previous episodes before". The tease was meant to be one of two options for the "Elseworlds" cold opening. The writers could not choose which opening they would use; Guggenheim said someone decided to "take one cold open, move that and make that the post-credit tag, like the way The Flash typically does, at the end of all three shows, and then have the other cold open at the beginning of hour one". Supergirl co-showrunner Robert Rovner said the tease was only supposed to air with Flash's "What's Past Is Prologue"; it was added to the other two episodes to make things easier for viewers because they "are coming to [the crossover] from our separate shows and we wanted something that [connects them together]".

Stephen Amell announced that, unlike previous Arrowverse crossovers, this one would not be as extravagant, but more about "the characters and the story", focusing on Green Arrow, Flash, Supergirl, Superman, and Batwoman. According to Guggenheim, by focusing only on Green Arrow, Flash, and Supergirl, the writers "really had a chance to tell a story about the troika that we've never really been able to do before". Legends of Tomorrow was not included in "Elseworlds" to highlight the amount of time Amell, Grant Gustin, and Melissa Benoist could interact. "Elseworlds" returned to the episodic format of the earlier crossovers, contrasting with the approach taken with "Crisis on Earth-X". Rovner said, "It's like a three chapters of one story, but they're all kind of unique to their own show"; The Flash showrunner Todd Helbing added, "Flash kind of feels like a Flash episode, Arrow feels like an Arrow episode, [and] Supergirl feels like a Supergirl episode".

"Elseworlds" features Amell and Gustin portraying each other's characters. Gustin noted, "You're not going to see me playing Oliver Queen's mannerisms, or Stephen playing Barry's mannerisms. It's more being aware that for some reason we've switched lives and destinies. It's more the fun of the situational comedy that we keep finding ourselves in, and less us having a complete role reversal." Amell added, "there are elements of his personality I have to embrace, and there are elements of my personality that he has to embrace" for Oliver and Barry to defeat the threat. Supergirl is the only other character who can see the true identities of Barry and Oliver; Benoist said, "She inevitably becomes kind of a middleman because ultimately there's conflict between the two and they start butting heads". Schwartz said "Elseworlds" would not "feel quite as dark" as "Crisis on Earth-X" and that there was "a lot more fun to be had" in "Elseworlds". Other reality changes in the episodes include Barry and Oliver becoming wanted criminals known as the Trigger Twins. One reality change that Guggenheim and Schwartz considered to do was bringing Sara Diggle, John Diggle's and Lyla Michaels' baby daughter who got erased in Flashpoint, back into existence, but they ultimately thought it wouldn't be as impactful as if they did it as part of the multiversal reboot in "Crisis".

Including Superman, who Berlanti had permission to use before March 2018, in the crossover helped justify introducing Lois Lane to the Arrowverse because she was a character the writer of Supergirl always wanted to introduce and "she organically fit" into the crossover story. With Kara "at a crossroads" after the events of "Bunker Hill", Rover said "the journey that she's on is kind of helped by Clark, who is returning from Argo [City] kind of on his own journey". Hoechlin also portrays John Deegan when he rewrites himself to be an antagonistic version of Superman. Gotham City in the crossover is considered "a failed city"; Batman "has been missing for several years", resulting in an increase in crime. Speaking of their adaptation of Gotham City, Dries called the city "not a happy place", "grimy", and "scary", adding, "Some people are thriving in [Batman's] absence because now they can start to do their own thing without the oversight. A lot of other people are suffering and they're losing hope, and the city itself and infrastructure is falling apart". Guggenheim called it "a dead city" and "practically a ghost town". While Batman is not seen in the crossover, the characters debate his existence; Oliver feels he is a myth and Barry believes he is real. Chronologically, Batwoman's appearance fits around "Who Are You", the fourth episode of Batwoman's first season that aired in October 2019, with Dries noting Batwoman would be "officially caught up" to "Elseworlds" at the conclusion of that episode.

"Elseworlds" includes many easter eggs and nods to past DC television series and media. The line spoken by Psycho Pirate at the end of the crossover—"worlds will live, worlds will die, and the universe will never be the same"—paraphrases the tagline DC Comics used to advertise Crisis on Infinite Earths in the run-up to its launch in 1985.

=== Casting ===
In early August, Ruby Rose was cast as Batwoman for the crossover and potential series. The producers noted Rose's passion in her audition and her "aura of cool, nonchalant, somewhat aloof, mixed with charming and thoughtful and funny that it just kind of all made sense for her to be Kate", according to Dries. Later that month, it was revealed that Tyler Hoechlin would reprise his role as Kal-El / Clark Kent / Superman in all three episodes and that the producers were planning to introduced Lois Lane in the crossover. By mid-September, Elizabeth Tulloch was cast as Lois Lane, Stephen Amell's wife Cassandra Jean Amell was cast to portray Nora Fries, Jeremy Davies had been cast as antagonist John Deegan, and LaMonica Garrett was cast in the "prominent role" of Mar Novu / Monitor. During filming in late October 2018, it was revealed that John Wesley Shipp, who has portrayed Henry Allen and Jay Garrick in the Arrowverse, would be reprising his role as Barry Allen / Flash from the 1990 television series. By the end of filming in early November, Bob Frazer was cast as Roger Hayden / Psycho Pirate.

=== Design ===
In "Elseworlds", Hoechlin wears an all-black Superman suit while portraying John Deegan's antagonistic version of the character. This costume is similar to the one he wears in the comics after returning from the dead as part of the "Death of Superman" crossover. Shipp's Flash costume from the 1990s series was recreated by The Flash costume designer Kate Main, using the original costume as a reference. Justin Hartley's Green Arrow costume from Smallville is seen in the opening on Earth-90. Guggenheim received permission from the Warner Bros. archives to include it, but had stipulations that it could not be worn by anyone and could not get dirty. He said, "we put it on a dummy, so thereby we satisfied that loophole, and as far as not getting it dirty, hopefully whoever at archives provided it to us never actually saw that episode."

=== Filming ===
Filming for Elseworlds began on October 9, 2018. On October 17, filming for the Kent family farm occurred at the farmhouse used in the series Smallville. The Supergirl writers pitched the Smallville farm as the meeting point for Kara and Clark because, considering the characters' experiences at the start of the crossover, it was an "organic place for them to meet". A "derelict mental health facility" in Vancouver was used for the Arkham Asylum scenes. Scenes of Gotham City and Wayne Enterprises were filmed in Chicago, Illinois. Filming concluded on November 3. Kevin Tancharoen directed The Flash episode, James Bamford served as director for the Arrow episode, and Jesse Warn directed Supergirl's episode.

=== Music ===
In scenes featuring the Earth-90 Flash, Danny Elfman's 1990s Flash series theme is used, while the theme song from Smallville, "Save Me" by Remy Zero, is used when Smallville on Earth-38 is first revealed.

== Marketing ==
The first teasers for the crossover aired on November 12 and 13, 2018, during episodes of Arrow and The Flash, respectively. On November 16, DC Comics released a poster for the event in the style of a comics cover, drawn by Amy Reeder. An additional teaser for the first episode aired during the November 18 episode of Supergirl and a week later, the official trailer was released.

== Release ==
=== Broadcast ===
The crossover began with The Flash on December 9, 2018, continued on Arrow on December 10, and concluded on Supergirl on December 11, all on The CW. The Flash, which normally airs on Tuesdays at 8 pm, and Supergirl, which normally airs on Sundays at 8 pm, swapped time-slots for the crossover.

=== Home media ===
The three episodes were released together on a separate DVD on August 26, 2019, in Region 2.

== Reception ==
=== Ratings ===
Viewership and ratings per episode of Elseworlds
No.	Series	Air date	Rating/share (18–49)	Viewers (millions)	DVR (18–49)	DVR viewers (millions)	Total (18–49)	Total viewers (millions)
1	The Flash	December 9, 2018	0.7/3	1.83	0.7	1.68	1.4	3.51
2	Arrow	December 10, 2018	0.8/3	2.06	0.5	1.40	1.3	3.46
3	Supergirl	December 11, 2018	0.8/3	2.17	0.5	1.36	1.3	3.53

=== Critical response ===
==== The Flash ====
The review aggregator website Rotten Tomatoes reported a 100% approval rating, based on 14 reviews for the episode. The website's critical consensus reads, "With disorienting body swaps, confusingly altered realities, and an awesome Superman-Supergirl team-up, there is a lot to love in this joy-filled Arrowverse crossover episode of The Flash". IGN rated The Flash episode 8.0/10. The verdict reads, "The body-swap premise at the center of the episode made the kickoff to the crossover a delight, though not without its flaws. Fortunately the charm of Barry and Oliver being forced to live each others' lives overshadowed the other shortcomings of the episode."

==== Arrow ====
Rotten Tomatoes reported a 100% approval rating, based on 14 reviews for the episode. The website's critical consensus reads, "'Elseworlds, Part 2' is a riotous continuation of this body-switching Arrowverse arc, successfully exploiting the chemistry between the television universe's ensemble and slickly introducing Ruby Rose as Batwoman". IGN rated Arrow's episode 8.5/10. The verdict reads, "[Part 2] not only manages to continue the momentum (and hilarity) of the previous episode, it also confidently introduces two elements that could have lasting effects on the Arrowverse as a whole -- Batwoman, and the promise of a potential Crisis (on Infinite Earths?). Fueled by the easy chemistry of Grant Gustin, Stephen Amell, and Melissa Benoist, [this] is one of the most enjoyable episodes from any of the shows in recent years."

==== Supergirl ====
Rotten Tomatoes reported a 93% approval rating, based on 14 reviews for the episodes. The website's critical consensus reads, "'Elseworlds, Part 3' wraps up the crossover fun in style, tying up enough loose ends to satisfy while providing a few unexpected twists to keep fans on their toes". IGN rated the Supergirl episode 8.7/10. The verdict reads, "If not the outright best of the Arrowverse crossovers, Elseworlds finds the most success in blending epic superhero spectacle with strong characterization and personal stakes. [this episode] wraps up the crossover with plenty of both, capping off a particularly strong character arc for Oliver Queen and making terrific use of Tyler Hoechlin's Superman. And despite all the emphasis on an even bigger conflict to come, [this episode] wraps up its own threads on a satisfying note."
