= Lois Lane (Superman & Lois) =

Fictional character in The CW television series

- Superman & Lois character
- Elizabeth Tulloch as Lois Lane
- First appearance: "Pilot"; Superman & Lois; February 23, 2021
- Last appearance: "It Went by So Fast"; Superman & Lois; December 2, 2024
- Based on: Lois Lane by: Jerry Siegel; Joe Shuster
- Adapted by: Greg Berlanti; Todd Helbing
- Portrayed by: Elizabeth Tulloch

In-universe information
- Species: Human
- Occupation: Journalist
- Affiliation: Daily Planet (former); Smallville Gazette
- Family: Sam Lane (father); Ella Lane (mother); Lucy Lane (sister)
- Spouse: Clark Kent (husband)
- Children: Jordan Kent (son); Jonathan Kent (son)
- Nationality: American

Lois Lane is a fictional character in The CW television series Superman & Lois, based on the DC Comics character of the same name, created by Jerry Siegel and Joe Shuster. Portrayed by Elizabeth Tulloch, Lois is a reporter for the Daily Planet and the wife of Clark Kent / Superman. Tulloch also played alternate versions of Lois Lane in the Arrowverse television series The Flash, Supergirl, Arrow, Batwoman, and DC's Legends of Tomorrow.

== Concept and creation ==
=== Background ===
The character of Lois Lane first appeared in Action Comics #1 alongside Superman in the first published story featuring either character. Lois was one of the first female characters to appear in an American superhero comic strip. With her long history with the Man of Steel, she has become one of the most iconic love interests in superhero stories and has been Clark Kent/Superman's primary love interest throughout his publication history.

Lois has appeared in all live action adaptions of Superman, starting with her portrayal by Noel Neill in the 1948 serial, by Phyllis Coates in Superman and the Mole Men, by Margot Kidder in the 1980s Superman film series alongside Christopher Reeve, and by Kate Bosworth alongside Brandon Routh in Superman Returns. Kidder's iconic portrayal of Lois won the actress numerous awards and international recognition. She has also appeared in television series: Adventures of Superman, Lois & Clark: The New Adventures of Superman played by Teri Hatcher and Smallville by Erica Durance.

=== Characterization ===
Actress Elizabeth Tulloch was cast as Lois Lane in September 2018 for the crossover event Elseworlds. According to Tulloch, she got the role because she read a Superman II scene "joyfully". Tulloch became the eighth actress to portray Lois in live action. When cast, Tulloch said "I'm so excited [...] to be playing the iconic Lois Lane on the Arrowverse," while also saying that she will be a "modern woman". When asked how is she going to portray the character on her own show, she responded by saying that she will try to combine the journalist and the mother in the most realistic way. She also described Lois as "badass", and that she may not have superpowers like her husband does, but she still is vital to the story. The executive producers described the character as "dogged, determined and brave". About her signing on appearing in her own show as Lois, she said that she was skeptical as it is a tough character, while also stating that "she's [Lois] wonderful".

On what attracted her to play Lois Lane, Tulloch stated: "As far as strong women go, it doesn't get much more impressive or cool than Lois Lane. She was introduced in 1938 and from the time she's been introduced, she's remained incredibly appealing and popular and iconic for really understandable reasons: She is determined, she is unafraid, she is uncompromising, she is incredibly intelligent. All of those things are balanced out by a sort of lovable goofiness about her. To me, it's a dream come true to play someone as wonderful as Lois Lane."

== Fictional character biography ==
=== Early life ===
Lois was raised by her father, Sam Lane, a United States General, along with her younger sister Lucy Lane. As an adult, Lois became a journalist in Metropolis, working for the Daily Planet newspaper. Shortly after meeting a fellow journalist, Clark Kent, Lois interview the superhero Superman and eventually forming a romance with Clark. After revealing his identity to Lois, Clark proposed to her and they married in Smallville. During their first wedding anniversary, Clark made a reservation at a restaurant to celebrate with her. That night, he doesn't show up at the restaurant, due to a robot invasion of Metropolis. The next day, they agree to try again, but fail, as she had extra work in the Daily Planet. Clark tried again to make the night happen, but is caught in a battle with Nuclear Man. They agree to try one more time, but she forgot about it, while investigating Toyman. The next day, Lois and Clark go to a park to discuss about it, and both agree to make the night happen no matter what. That day, Lobo arrived in Metropolis, and took Clark hostage. Clark managed to escape, and defeat him, returning on Earth, having missed his date, but also Lois had too, while she was catching a corrupt politician. Clark eventually takes Lois to Hawaii to celebrate their wedding anniversary, a tradition they continue every year. By 2007, Lois gave birth to twins: Jonathan and Jordan. She was also pregnant to a daughter, Natalie, but ultimately had a miscarriage, an event that haunted her and Clark. To deal with that shocking event, she went to psychological therapy. By 2009, Lois became a world-renowned journalist, being short-listed twice for the Pulitzer Prize.

=== Life in Smallville ===
==== Investigating Morgan Edge ====
Lois quit her job in the Daily Planet, after Morgan Edge bought the newspaper, started firing the personnel, and started becoming manipulative over his journalists, including Lois. When Clark learnt that his adoptive mother, Martha Kent, died from a stroke, Lois and her family go to Smallville, Kansas, to attend her funeral. There, she meets Clark's childhood friends Kyle Cushing and Lana Lang Cushing. During their stay, it is revealed that Jordan has superpowers, like his father. Lois and her husband decide to stay in Smallville, and start a new life there. In the small town, she starts working for the Smallville Gazette, a local newspaper. She starts investigating Edge and his activities in Smallville, together with the editor-in-chief of the Gazette, Chrissy Beppo. The two were attacked by someone with Kryptonian powers, only to be stopped by Clark. Lois' research was disrupted when a man, called The Stranger started causing problems in Smallville. This attracted the attention of the Department of Defense, which sent General Sam Lane, her father, to contain the event. After his arrival, Lois and Sam had frequent arguments about Clark's actions and the way she was raising her children. Sometime later, Lois finds out Stranger's real identity, a man named John Henry Irons, and informs Clark that he is from another universe, as Irons of their universe was dead. Irons reveals to Clark that he and Lois were married, and had a daughter, Natalie, and he was in their universe because his was destroyed by Superman. After Clark makes it clear to Irons that he is not a threat to humanity, he leaves the town.

After a while Lois finds out that Edge wants to buy out the entire Smallville to exploit its resources of X-Kryptonite. Sometime later, Edge reveals to Clark that he is Kryptonian and the half-brother of his, from his mother's side, with his true name being Tal-Rho. The two fight and Edge is able to brainwash him and put the consciousness of General Zod in his mind. When Lois learnt that Clark was possessed, she called Irons to help him become Superman again. The two succeed, and Clark asked Irons to help him take down Edge, as he became the powerful Eradicator. The heroes defeated Edge and handed him to the Department of Defense. With the threat of Edge gone, she and Chrissy agreed to work together to improve the Smallville Gazette. As Lois, Clark, their sons and Irons were having a small chat before the last one was about to leave, a pod containing Natalie crashed in front of them.

==== The Inverse Society ====
Natalie initially mistakes Lois for her mother and begins to run to her before John takes her away to explain the situation. Lois, still shocked at seeing Natalie and reminded of her miscarriage, stands in silence. A few months later, Clark notices Lois acting stricter than usual with Chrissy at the Gazette and with Jonathan when she catches him almost having sex, leading Lois to confess she still feels guilty about how she reacted towards Natalie's arrival. After John tells Lois of Natalie's struggles to adapt to the new world, she finally decides to speak with her and invites the two to stay at the Kents' farm to help them adjust.

Lois' sister Lucy goes on a podcast to debunk Lois' story about Ally Allston, the leader of the Inverse Society, a cult that Ally became involved with after she lost her job and fiancé. With the credibility of the Gazette now at risk, Lois and Chrissy begin to investigate Ally and the Inverse Society, where Chrissy loses trust in Lois after discovering Lois left out crucial details in her story out of concern for Lucy. Sam and Lois get in contact with Lucy and attempt to make amends while continuing their investigation, but are unable to shake Lucy's past grudges with them and her commitment to Ally. Chrissy eventually discovers Ally's plan to merge with her alternate self in the Inverse World and eventually merge the two worlds as a whole and informs Lois.

To protect Lana from Ally's plans and her alternate self, Clark and Lois decide to inform Lana that Clark is Superman. Lana is initially more angry at Lois, believing their friendship was built on a lie, but the two reconcile and Lana agrees to keep their secret under her terms. After locating Lucy in Burnham Woods, Sam and Lois try to convince her that Ally's become power-hungry after merging with her Inverse counterpart, but she refuses to listen, resulting in Ally siphoning and nearly killing Sam and Superman. After reconciling with her sister, Lois works together with Superman, the Irons, and her family to stop Ally from merging worlds. After the Allys are separated and arrested, Lois completes her story by interviewing them before seeing Lucy off as she moves to Metropolis and reveals Clark's secret to Chrissy.

==== Cancer Diagnosis ====
A month after Ally's defeat, Lois begins investigating the leader of Intergang, Bruno Mannheim, and his connections to the death of the John of her world. Lois begins by questioning John's sister, Dr. Darlene Irons, who runs some tests on her after reporting suspicious symptoms and diagnoses her with stage 3 inflammatory breast cancer. She attempts to put off chemotherapy to focus more on the Mannheim story with Chrissy, but her family and friends convince her to prioritize her health. When they discover that Mannheim has stolen Superman's blood from the D.O.D., Lois signs up as a chemo patient at a hospital in Hob's Bay, an area run by Bruno, so she can get the necessary treatment while looking further into his crimes. During her time there, she bonds with a fellow patient named Peia, who is revealed to be Bruno's wife. Lois discovers Mannheim's crimes stem from his desire to fix the Suicide Slums and cure his wife's condition.

After finding out about Peia's powers and abilities to mimic other voices, Lois realizes her story that implicated Lex Luthor in Boss Moxie's death and sent him to prison may have been wrong. During her and Superman's investigations, she completes her chemotherapy. During her double mastectomy, Superman helps Peia let go in her dying moments, giving her family closure and saving the city. With Mannheim now cooperating and confessing his role in Moxie's death, Luthor is released from prison, but delays the news from releasing to the press so he could confront Lois at the Kent farm. He angrily demands her to retire for wrongfully imprisoning him for 17 years and threatens her family if she refuses. At the meteor shower festival, Lois watches as Superman is forced to fight his Inverse counterpart, who has transformed into a giant monster after being repeatedly killed by Luthor.

==== Battling Luthor ====
After both Superman and his counterpart, the latter dubbed "Doomsday", disappear into space, Lois contends with Luthor, who moves his base to Smallville to continue harassing the Kents, while trying to protect her sons. Doomsday eventually returns to Earth with Superman's corpse, having torn his heart from his body to deliver to Luthor. Lois mourns for her husband but vows to put Luthor behind bars again. After Luthor sends Doomsday to attack the Department of Defense and find out his daughter Elizabeth's whereabouts from Sam Lane, Sam sacrifices his life so that his heart can be used to bring Superman back to life. Lois reunites with Clark but asks him to keep a low profile. They attempt to reason with Luthor by persuading Elizabeth to meet with him and reconcile, but Luthor refuses to give up his grudge against the Kents and Elizabeth severs his ties with Luthor for good. Lois and Clark start to rally Smallville against Luthor. After Luthor exposes Superman as Clark, attempts to assassinate Lana and tries to discredit Lois on television, Lois almost has Elizabeth expose Luthor for his other crimes, but Luthor has his hacker Milton steal Irons's warsuit and attack Superman, though it further damages Lois's reputation. Luthor eventually locates Doomsday in the mines again, kills him one last time to make him more powerful and sets him on Smallville until he is defeated for good by Superman. During the attack, Lois persuades Luthor's assistant Amanda McCoy that Luthor is beyond helping and to testify against him. After Superman defeats Luthor, he is sent back to prison for good. A year later, at John Henry and Lana's wedding, Lois and Clark see that Luthor's appeal was denied.

==== Aftermath ====
With Clark's identity as Superman now public knowledge, Lois and Clark decide to start a foundation to help people in need all over the world. Over the years, Lois sees Jordan and Jonathan marry their girlfriends and have children of their own. At some point, Lois's cancer returns and she dies with her husband and sons at her side. Sometime later, Clark also passes away of a heart attack, and he reunites with Lois in the afterlife.

== Alternate versions ==
=== Earth-38 ===
Lois Lane
- Arrowverse character
- First appearance: "Elseworlds, Part 1"; The Flash; December 9, 2018
- Last appearance: "Crisis on Infinite Earths: Part Five"; Legends of Tomorrow; January 14, 2020
- Based on: DC Comics Lois Lane by Jerry Siegel; Joe Shuster
- Adapted by: Greg Berlanti
- Portrayed by: Elizabeth Tulloch

In-universe information
- Occupation: Journalist
- Affiliation: Daily Planet
- Family: Sam Lane (father); Lucy Lane (sister)
- Spouse: Clark Kent
- Children: Jonathan Kent (son); Unnamed (son)
- Nationality: American

==== Early life ====
Lois was born in Metropolis to General Sam Lane. She has a younger sister, Lucy, but the two of them don't have good relations. Despite her father's wishes, Lois never attended a military academy nor joined the U.S. Army. Instead, she pursued a career in investigative journalism, rising to become one of the best reporters of the Daily Planet, and the best reporter of the world. Over the years, Lois grew estranged from her father due to his immorality, black and white view of aliens, and control issues over his daughter's life. At some point, she met fellow journalist, Clark Kent, with whom she fell in love with. She also developed a strong rivalry with Cat Grant. During her relationship with Clark, she learnt that he was Superman. In late 2015 she tried to book an interview with Clark's cousin, and superheroine, Kara Danvers / Supergirl, but didn't find the time. After Clark returned from National City, he took Lois to his planet, Argo, to show her his Kryptonian culture. There, she learnt she was pregnant with a son.

==== Visiting Earth-1 ====
After Lois and Clark returned from Argo, they went and stayed in Clark's home house in Smallville. Together with Kara Danvers, they began upgrading the house barn, when Barry Allen and Oliver Queen as the Green Arrow and The Flash, respectively, from Earth-1 appeared, seeking Kara's help. Then, Cisco Ramon / Vibe appeared and informed them about A.M.A.Z.O.'s attack to Central City and seeks their help. Clark asks Lois if he can join the heroes, and she allows him. After Clark returns to his world, Lois joins him in the Fortress of Solitude, and have a dinner, until Barry, Oliver and Cisco appear again wanting Clark's help to defeat John Deegan who uses the Book of Destiny to destroy reality. Clark and Lois goes, and with the help of Brainiac, Kara, Barry and Oliver defeat him. After the battle, her and Clark go to the Fortress, where Clark proposes to her, with Lois saying "yes". Afterwards they go to Argo.

==== Crisis and searching the Multiverse ====
Clark and Lois' peace was disrupted when a wave of anti-matter threatened and destroyed their planet, Argo. Both were teleported by Lyla Michaels / Harbinger, but their son, whom they had putted inside a pod and sent to Earth, went missing. Lyla informed the heroes that the anti-matter wave must be stopped at Lois' universe, dubbed Earth-38. Lois, Brainiac and Sara Lance / White Canary travel to Earth-16, where Brainiac had located her son's pod in that universe's Star City. There, in the Green Arrow's layer they found him, being protected by that universe's Oliver Queen. After thanking him, they return to the Waverider, where the other heroes were. As Lois reunites with her husband, she observes Oliver's death.

After the Monitor informs the heroes that there are seven individuals known as Paragons, who can defeat the Anti-Monitor, Lois volunteered to help find the Paragon of Truth. With Clark and Iris West-Allen, they begin searching the Multiverse for the Paragon, first traveling to Earth-75, where she watches the news of Superman's death, in the hands of Lex Luthor from her universe, using the Book of Destiny revealing that he is jumping to universes to kill all the Supermen, as one of them should be the Paragon. After that they visit Earth-167, where they meet with that universe's Clark Kent, but Lex, using the Book, kicks them from that Earth, but doesn't kill Clark, as he is powerless. The trio goes to Earth-96, where they meet the editor-in-chief of the Daily Planet, Clark Kent, who had suffered the loss of all of the people he cared for in a terroristic attack at the newspaper, thus making him the Paragon of Truth. In that moment Luthor appeared, using the Book, forcing Earth-96 Clark to attack Clark. They fight, but Lois knocked Lex out, thus Earth-96 Clark came back to his senses. Clark, Lois, Iris and Earth-96 Clark then returned to the Waverider, to join the other heroes. With the team's best efforts failing, the Multiverse is consumed by anti-matter. Then, a mind-controlled by the Anti-Monitor Harbinger appeared on the ship, killing the Monitor. Nash Wells / Pariah then sends the Paragons to the Vanishing Point, though her, Clark, Iris, John Diggle / Spartan, Jefferson Pierce / Black Lightning and Ralph Dibny / Elongated Man are consumed by anti-matter, killing them.

==== Merging into Earth-Prime ====
After the fight between the Paragons with the Anti-Monitor and his forces result into victory for the first mentioned, Oliver, now a cosmic being called the Spectre, restarts the Multiverse, combining Lois' Earth, Earth-1 and Jefferson's Earth forming Earth-Prime, restoring everyone to life, including Lois. In the new universe, she calls Clark to inform him that they have twins.

=== Earth-75 ===
A version of the character appeared on Earth-75 in the "Crisis on Infinite Earths" crossover event. This version is mourning the death of her Superman who was killed by Lex Luthor of their world and was broadcast globally.

=== Earth-167 ===
A version of Lois appeared in "Crisis on Infinite Earths" on Earth-167. This Lois is married to Clark Kent, and lives in Smallville with their two daughters. It was revealed that this version of Superman gave up his powers to be with his family.

=== Earth-96 ===
On this Earth, Lois, along with Perry White, Jimmy Olsen, and other co-workers were killed when a "reject from Gotham" gassed the Daily Planet. Since the incident, Clark has donned an outfit similar to the Kingdom Come version of Superman.

=== Unnamed Earth ===
On an unnamed Earth, Lois a world-renowned journalist and working for the Daily Planet is married to scientist John Henry Irons. They have a daughter together named, Natalie Irons. At some point, Superman had a breakdown and attacked Metropolis, killing Lois while she was reporting the attacks. When the anti-matter wave destroyed Earth, John and Natalie escaped to another Earth.

=== Inverse Earth/Bizarro World ===
On the inverse Earth, Lois was also married to Superman and gave birth to Jonathan and Jordan, however Superman was more of a celebrity on this Earth, resulting in them not being present in their children's lives. Unlike the main Earth, Jonathan develops powers instead of Jordan, and ends up joining Ally's cult to merge with his other self. This combined with Superman's reliance on green Kryptonite to power himself leads Lois to leaving Superman with Jordan and her father.

== Reception ==
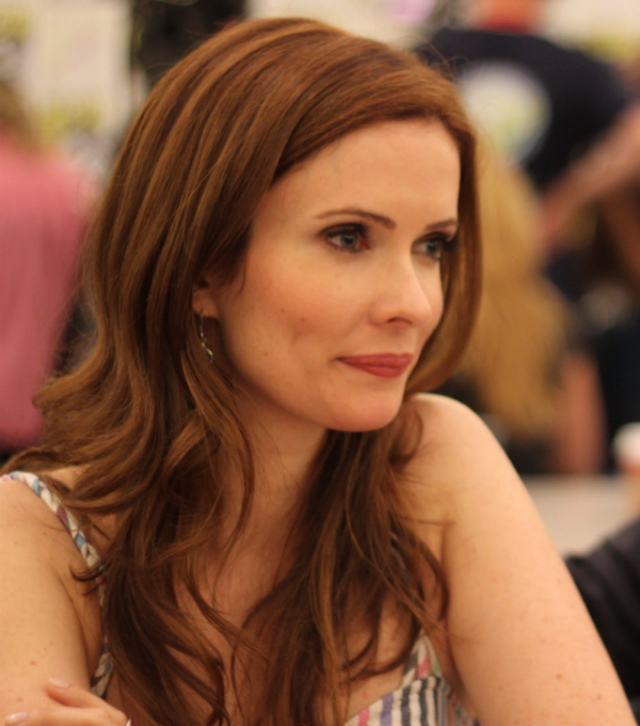
Tulloch at the 2011 San Diego Comic-Con

Tulloch was cast as Lois Lane in September 2018. The casting came as a surprise to many, as the crossover event was already pacted with characters, and was going to introduce Ruby Rose as Kate Kane / Batwoman. After she was given her own show, comparison between her and Amy Adams's version of the character begun, with people calling Tulloch's version more accurate to the comics. The portrayal of the character was praised by critics, but noted that sometimes she felt like a recurring role in her own show, but made clear that she is a driving force.

Cinemablend.com praised Tulloch for her performance, writing that thanks to her, the character became more prominent to the Arrowverse and Superman & Lois. Fans also expressed their support for Tulloch, while highlighting that she is as important as Hoechlin's Superman is. CBR.com added that Lois is comicbook accurate and Tulloch is doing an incredible job at displaying the "ambition, [Lois'] drive, and [Lois'] emotional vulnerability". Others also supported the notion that Tulloch's Lois is "the glue holding Superman and Lois together" and exceeded all expectations.

== Comic book tie-ins ==
- Lois was mentioned in Adventures of Supergirl, a tie-in comic of the TV series Supergirl, in the issue "Attack Edge!".
- Lois appears in Earth-Prime: Superman & Lois #2, a six-issue comic event set entirely in the universe of DC's superhero shows. The comic series is considered part of the superhero series canon and spotlight Superman/Clark and Lois trying to celebrate their first wedding anniversary.

== See also ==
- Lois Lane (1978 film series character)
- Lois Lane (DC Extended Universe)
- Lois Lane in other media
