= Clark Kent (Superman & Lois) =

Character in Superman & Lois

- Superman & Lois character
- Tyler Hoechlin as Kent in promotional image from season 1 of Superman & Lois
- First appearance: "Pilot"; Superman & Lois; February 23, 2021
- Last appearance: "It Went By So Fast"; Superman & Lois; December 2, 2024
- Based on: Superman by: Jerry Siegel; Joe Shuster
- Adapted by: Glen Winter; Greg Berlanti; Todd Helbing
- Portrayed by: Tyler Hoechlin; Lennix James (4-year-old); Thomas Hoeving (young); Parker Cousineau (grade school); Dylan Kingwell (teenager; season 1); Josh Zaharia (teenager; season 2)

In-universe information
- Full name: Kal-El (birth); Clark Kent (adoptive)
- Alias: Superman
- Species: Kryptonian
- Occupation: Journalist (former); High school football coach; Superhero
- Family: Jor-El (father); Lara Lor-Van (mother); Jonathan Kent (adoptive father); Martha Kent (adoptive mother)
- Spouse: Lois Lane (wife)
- Children: Jordan Kent (son); Jonathan Kent (son)
- Home: Smallville, Kansas, United States
- Origin: Krypton
- Abilities: Invulnerability; Superhuman strength, speed, sight, and hearing; Frost breath; Heat vision; X-ray vision; Flight

Clark Kent, also known by his birth name Kal-El or superhero alias Superman, is a superhero in the 2021 The CW television series Superman & Lois; originally developed as a part of the Arrowverse franchise of television series, first mentioned in the 2015 pilot of Supergirl, based on the character of the same name created by Jerry Siegel and Joe Shuster, and adapted for television by Glen Winter, Greg Berlanti and Todd Helbing from the previous Arrowverse adaptation of the character by Berlanti, Andrew Kreisberg, and Jessica Queller. Clark Kent had been portrayed by Tyler Hoechlin in the Arrowverse since 2016 prior to the development of Superman & Lois as a spin-off of Supergirl, in which Hoechlin reprised his role as co-headliner, initially said to be playing the same incarnation of Superman he had played in Supergirl, before the series was retroactively established to be set in its own continuity, on an Earth different from Earth-Prime, in its second season finale.

As commonly depicted in most media featuring the character, Clark is a humanoid alien refugee from the planet Krypton who lands on Earth, developing superhuman abilities and becoming Superman, Earth's only superhero, while also working as a journalist for the Daily Planet newspaper journal in Metropolis, eventually marrying his colleague Lois Lane and having two children — Jordan and Jonathan — with her. In Superman & Lois, after he and Lois are fired from their jobs at the Planet after it is sold to Clark's secret half-brother Tal-Rho (under the alias of Morgan Edge), and Clark's adoptive human mother then dies of a stroke, the Kent family elect to move back to Clark's childhood home in Smallville. After subsequently realizing that one of their sons have also begun to develop superpowers, Clark and Lois reveal his identity as Superman to them.

Prior to starring in Superman & Lois, Hoechlin played various Supermen living in alternate universes depicted throughout multiple Arrowverse series, such as Supergirl, The Flash, Arrow, Batwoman, and Legends of Tomorrow, in particular a version from Earth-38 who has a cousin, Kara Danvers / Supergirl (the main character of Supergirl, in which Hoechlin had first portrayed Superman), a character who does not exist on the as-yet-designated Earth seen in Superman & Lois.

== Concept and creation ==
As one of the most prominent superheroes for DC Comics, Superman had previously been portrayed in TV several times and most prominently in the 2001 to 2011 TV series Smallville, with Tom Welling taking on the role of Superman. The first show about the character came in the 1950s, titled Adventures of Superman, with George Reeves portraying Superman. Two more series came in the 1980s and 1990s, Superboy and Lois & Clark: The New Adventures of Superman. Welling's performance was widely regarded as one of the greatest in the character's history, but after that series' finale, the character was seen only in films for several years. Meanwhile, the film Man of Steel, which was released in 2013, saw Henry Cavill take up the mantle of Superman, with the film becoming the starting point of the DC Extended Universe.

With the announcement of a Supergirl TV show, speculation arose as to whether Superman would appear. The character appeared in silhouette only in season 1, portrayed by Kevin Caliber. Eventually, Hoechlin appeared in season 2 as Superman in a recurring capacity. He would later return for the Arrowverse crossover events Elseworlds and Crisis on Infinite Earths. In 2019, a series featuring Hoechlin portraying Clark was announced, which premiered in 2021, ten years after the finale of Welling's Smallville, titled Superman & Lois. While initially announced as a spin-off of Supergirl set in The CW's Arrowverse, Superman & Lois was later established to be set on its own Earth, separate from Earth-Prime's continuity.

=== Characterization ===
Hoechlin was cast as Superman on the CW series Supergirl in 2016 and was "the only choice" according to Greg Berlanti. Describing the casting as "surreal", Hoechlin said he hoped to successfully embody the optimism of the character and maintain the idea of Superman as a symbol of hope. Hoechlin, at first, didn't want to take the role, because of the weight it had. When asked about the character in his show, Superman & Lois, he said "It's really not a show about Superman, it's about a husband and a wife who are parents and the husband happens to be Superman." He added "I've intentionally stayed away [from Superman since getting the role]. I've found it more beneficial to have an impulse and trust it without the hesitation of, 'Oh, so-and-so already did that.' It makes it easier to just go do my thing without overthinking it." Hoechlin, when asked about having to play multiple characters in Superman & Lois, said that "it was tough, but he could handle it", after having previously portrayed alternate versions of Superman in the Arrowverse.

=== Suit design ===
Superman's bodysuit in Supergirl is a classic design, inspired mainly by the Man of Steel one. It has many elements in common with Melissa Benoist's Supergirl's costume. After Superman & Lois was greenlit, a new suit was created. Hoechlin, commented on the new suit, "It represents everything that Superman stands for and has stood for, for almost a century now." Hoechlin commented that the new suit represents everyone who see something in the symbol of it. The costume was designed by Laura Jean Shannon, who also worked for other DC shows, such as Titans and Black Lightning, and who made many changes to the traditional look. According to popular website Den of Geek, "[The] new suit fixes all of those problems, with dynamic lines that help showcase the actor's physique, cleaning up some flourishes, and generally bringing it all together with a more classic look for the character. But it's not TOO classic, as there's still a few elements that are uniquely modern, and should look really great in action."

In earlier Arrowverse appearances, Hoechlin wore other suits, like a black one paying homage to the Reign of the Supermen comic book storyline, and a suit similar to the first one Superman wore in Max Fleischer's Action Comics #1.

== Fictional character biography ==
=== Early life ===
Clark was born in 1979, on the planet Krypton, and his pod crashed in Smallville, Kansas, and was found by Jonathan and Martha Kent, after the destruction of the planet. He attended Smallville High School, where he befriended Kyle Cushing and Lana Lang. At some point his father died due to a heart attack. A year after his father's death, Clark struggled with finding his purpose on Earth and began using his powers to help people in secret, concealing his identity by wearing a ski-mask. After leaving Smallville, he discovered the Fortress of Solitude where the AI version of his biological father, Jor-El, was waiting for him. After their discussion and a period of training with Jor-El, he returned to Smallville, where he talked to his mother about his discoveries, and she encouraged him to become a hero, wearing a hand-made suit she created for him. Clark decided to move to Metropolis and work for the Daily Planet, where he met a fellow journalist, Lois Lane. Clark eventually proposed to her and they married in Smallville. In 2007, Lois gave birth to twins, Jonathan and Jordan. Lois was also pregnant with a daughter she intended to name Natalie, but she had a miscarriage and lost the baby, an event that haunted her and Clark.

==== First wedding anniversary ====
During their first wedding anniversary, Clark makes a reservation at a restaurant to celebrate with his wife Lois. That night, he does not show up at the restaurant, due to a robot invasion of Metropolis. The next day, they agree to try again, but fail, as Lois had extra work in the Daily Planet. Clark retries to make the night happen, but is caught in a battle with Nuclear Man. They agree to try one more time, but Lois forgot about it while investigating Toyman. The next day, Lois and Clark go to a park to discuss about it, and both agree to make the night happen no matter what. That day, Lobo arrived in Metropolis, and took Clark hostage. Clark manages to escape, and defeat him, returning on Earth, having missed his date, but to his surprise Lois had too. The two meet in front of the restaurant, with Clark suggesting to Lois to take her in Hawaii, something she agreed on, celebrating there.

=== Battling Tal-Rho ===
After the death of his mother, he and Lois decide to stay in Smallville and raise their teenage sons there. He also reunited with his childhood friends, Kyle Cushing and Lana Lang Cushing. Clark took the job of coach of the local High School football team, while continuing his superhero activities. After his son, Jordan, showed signs of Kryptonian abilities, he revealed his identity, and took him to the Fortress of Solitude to meet his biological grandfather, Jor-El. Their peace in Smallville was interrupted when a stranger with a power suit appeared and battled Clark. It turned out his name was John Henry Irons, and arrived on Earth-Prime after an anti-matter wave destroyed his. Irons's goal was to kill Clark, as in his universe he killed his wife Lois Lane Irons. Eventually, Clark convinced Irons he was not a threat and the two made peace. While Clark's and Irons's conflict was unveiling, Morgan Edge was exploiting X-Kryptonite from the underground of Smallville. He eventually met with Clark, revealing that he is his maternal half-brother, Tal-Rho. He and Tal-Rho fought, with Clark losing and having General Zod's consciousness implemented in his brain through the X-Kryptonite. Clark managed to overcome Zod and took back control of his body. After stopping an invasion of Kryptonians inhabiting human bodies, with the help of Irons, he stopped Tal-Rho and sent him to prison.

=== Stopping the merging of worlds ===
After some time, he started having painful visions that weaken him. A while after, an armored being was able to escape Smallville's mines, and he and John Henry Irons / Steel, tried to stop him from destroying the town, but failed as he escaped. Later, Clark and John located him in Bolivia and attacked him, but he managed to run away. The same day, the armored man tried to kill Ally Allston, but Clark stopped him; they had a brief fight that led them to the mines and knocked him unconscious with a shard of X-Kryptonite. He took him to Lara Lor-Van's hologram, and communicated with him, revealing he is an alternate version of Clark from another universe. He also told him that he was after Ally and wanted to destroy the pendant, a weapon able to merge universes. When Mitch Anderson found an excuse to capture him, he threw him in prison, with his brother, Tal. The two managed to escape, and were just in time to fight with the alternate Clark. Mitch, who was also present, killed the Bizarro Clark. Eventually, Clark ended up in the Bizarro World, where he learned about his counterpart's life. There he fought the Bizarro versions of Lana Lang / Superwoman. He escaped it, but lost his energy. Tal helped him and took him to the Sun, where he absorbed the energy he needed and stopped Ally from merging the two worlds. Tal left his nephews some vehicles and gave Lois and Clark access to his villas and other residences for different trips. After Tal went to live on Bizarro World, Clark established another version of the Fortress of Solitude somewhere in the ocean for his family to also make use of.

=== Battling Intergang ===
After discovering that the head of Intergang, Bruno Mannheim, was responsible for the death of their Earth's John Henry Irons, Clark and Lois began investigating Mannheim, hoping to put him away. Around the same time, Lois received a terminal breast cancer diagnosis, something which took its toll on the entire Kent family. Lois decided to have her cancer treatment at Mannheim's hospital in Hobb's Bay so she could get a closer look at his files, in the process meeting and befriending his wife, Peia. Superman would eventually cross paths with an assassin who could manipulate sound into a weapon, who was Peia in disguise, along with other terminally ill convicts with Kryptonian powers from Superman's blood which Mannheim had stolen from the Department of Defense, along with Bizarro's body, all as a plan to find a cure for Peia's cancer. While investigating Mannheim, Clark and Lois discovered the truth regarding the death of Mannheim's former employer, Moxie, who had actually been murdered by Peia, who herself then falsified a taped confession from Lex Luthor which had sent Luthor to prison, leading them to realize that Luthor was innocent of the crime. After Peia eventually lost control of her powers and died following a confrontation with Superman, Mannheim confessed to all his crimes in exchange for his son Matteo not being charged as an accessory. The confession led to Luthor's release, who began seeking revenge against the Kents. Clark furiously told Luthor to back off the first time, but he returned a month later with a resurrected and mutated Bizarro, who he ordered to remove Superman's heart. The subsequent battle took its toll on both Kryptonians and led them to the moon.

=== The Death of Superman ===
Superman was eventually killed by Bizarro and his corpse delivered to his family, though Jordan took his body to the Fortress to be placed in suspension. He was brought back to life a few days later via heart transplant by Lois's father, Sam, who had just been killed by Bizarro. Clark's powers were severely limited by his new human and elderly heart, however. Remembering that the source of Luthor's anger was his estranged relationship with his daughter, Elizabeth, Clark and Lois arranged a meeting between Lex and Elizabeth for them to reconcile, which failed due to Luthor's obsession with revenge on Lois. Lois managed to locate Bizarro and help him remember his past and his family and implore him to stop listening to Luthor. Clark later reached his breaking point with Luthor after he tried to have Lana killed for interfering with his plans; after a brutal fight in Smallville's streets, Clark ordered Luthor to leave and never return. Luthor instead retaliated by forcing Clark to reveal his identity to the world as Superman, and hijacking John Henry's suit for his own use, and used it to locate Bizarro in the mines as he was trying to return to the Inverse World. Superman was too late to stop Luthor killing Bizarro again, this time mutating him into the monstrous Doomsday. With Superman now outclassed, Doomsday beat him severely in the streets until Jordan and Jonathan (the latter's powers having since appeared) intervened and helped John Henry knock Doomsday out with a blow to the head. Superman carried Doomsday towards the sun, but the blow had fully awoken Doomsday's memories and he surrendered, allowing Superman to push him peacefully into the sun, atomizing him. Superman returned to Earth and defeated Luthor, subsequently sending him back to prison for life.

=== Reign of the Supermen ===
Over the next thirty-two years, Clark used his and his family's newfound status to start charities to help people around the world. He made his sons, John Henry and Natalie Irons into members of the Super Team, and witnessed Jon and Jordan grow up, get married and have children of their own.

At some point, Lois's cancer returned and she died with Clark by her side. Clark subsequently adopted a dog who he named Krypto and lived out the rest of his days until he suffered a heart attack and died later with his sons beside him. Experiencing death a second time, Clark walked through his house and was visited by images of his sons, grandchildren, Krypto, Chrissy, Kyle, John Henry, Lana and even a repentant Luthor, before being reunited with Lois in the afterlife.

== Alternate versions ==
=== Going insane ===
A version of the character appears in the first season of Superman & Lois and in the comic book Earth-Prime #2 & #6, wearing a black-white suit identical to the one John Deegan had. His name is Kal-El and he was born on Krypton. After its destruction, he is sent to Earth, and was adopted by Jonathan and Martha Kent. At a young age, during the 4th of July, their car crashed, killing his parents, and he was taken to a foster family, where he was abused and bullied. One day, he accidentally killed his foster dad, and left, only to be taken by the U.S. Government, unsuccessfully experimenting on him. Kal managed to escape, and found his father's A.I., who advised him to save humanity from what it had become, with Kal himself despite his foster family and the U.S. Government's abuse, still partially loving humanity due to his original adoptive parents. He spent 20 years saving people, until one day his half-brother Tal-Rho came to him and promised that with his help, they can bring back Krypton on Earth. With Kal growing frustrated over how despite his best attempts to help humanity that they seemingly were never able to evolve from destroying themselves, Kal agreed, and with the help of other people with powers like his, destroyed Metropolis and killed Lois Lane Irons and many soldiers commanded by Sam Lane. At some point later, his world was destroyed by a wave of anti-matter (Note: What caused this was Crisis on Infinite Earths.) as he attempts, but fails, to stop John Henry Irons from escaping it in a ship. Before he was killed, Magog appeared and told him he had plans for him.

Magog transported Kal to Earth-Prime, in the year 2049, along with other supervillains. He first attacked Gotham City. With the help of the villains Clayface, Evil Eye, the Necrians, and a clone of Earth-2 villain Needle, Kal attacked Central City. There, he fought Kara Danvers / Supergirl, Jay Garrick / The Flash, Wally West / Kid Flash, and J'onn J'onzz / Martian Manhunter. When Magog was defeated, he vanished back to his universe.

=== Bizarro / Doomsday ===
Kal-El was operating in another Earth, with "bizarre" versions of its opposite, Earth-Prime. He was a global celebrity, and was close with his brother, Tal-Rho, attending his wedding with Lana Lang. He had two children, Jon-El and Jordan-El. He became obsessed with the fame he attracted, and lost touch with his family. At some point, his family abandoned him, and he stole an ancient artifact which can give godhood powers, the Pendant, from the conquer of his world, Ally Allston, and escaped to Earth-Prime, to kill her version, so that she could never merge with her. He arrived in the mines of Smallville, where he was trapped due to the X-Kryptonite existing in the area, de-powering him. As a result of this, Clark Kent / Superman had seizures with painful headaches. A team of scientists went to investigate the reason for the earthquakes, but were killed by him. After a while, he was able to escape the mines, and was confronted by Superman and John Henry Irons / Steel, but defeated them, fleeing to the Fortress of Solitude, where his headaches intensified. He decided to kill his counterpart, but failed and was confronted by the Supermen of America, killing two out of the three in the process. Superman and Steel arrived, but he managed to escape. He later killed Dr. Kit Faulkner, an associate of this world's Ally Allston. When Lois Lane saw him, he flew away. Superman managed to overpower him, and knocked him out with a piece of X-Kryptonite, and took him to Tal-Rho's Fortress, where Lara Lor-Van's AI and Clark talked with him, revealing he was in their world to stop Ally from destroying his universe. He was killed by Mitch Anderson using X-Kryptonite, with his body being held within a private D.O.D facility. Mitch would later regret this action when he meets Bizarro's family. About a year after his death, Kal-El's body is stolen by Intergang and experimented on in the hopes of using his philology to create a serum to save terminally ill criminals while also giving them superpowers, leading to Bizarro's resurrection. Bizarro was then repeatedly killed and resurrected again by Lex Luthor, transforming him into Doomsday, a feral monster loyal only to Luthor. Under Luthor's orders, Doomsday killed Superman and delivered his heart to Luthor. He would later be summoned again by Luthor to attack the Department of Defense, easily fighting his way past John Henry and Natalie Irons, and murdering General Sam Lane after he refused to disclose the location of Luthor's estranged daughter Elizabeth. Lois noticed Doomsday's rather calmer demeanor when looking at her, however, and assumed that he recognized her to a degree. She summoned him with Luthor's ELT and implored him not to follow Luthor's orders to harm her family. Doomsday recognised Lois as a doppleganger of his estranged wife and simply flew off. A while later, Luthor located Doomsday in the Shuster mines where he was trying in vain to get back to the Inverse World. Luthor killed Doomsday once again and unleashed him on Smallville as revenge for the town rejecting him. In the ensuing battle, Doomsday was knocked out with John Henry's hammer with help from Superman, Jon and Jordan. Knowing that Doomsday would awaken any second, Superman took his body and flew him towards the Sun to atomize him. Doomsday woke up and broke away from Superman, but raised his hands in surrender, the blow having restored his memories fully, and allowed Superman to gently push him into the Sun, allowing him to finally die at peace.

=== Earth-38 ===
Clark Kent
- Arrowverse character
- First appearance: "Pilot"; Supergirl; October 10, 2016
- Last appearance: "Crisis on Infinite Earths: Part Five"; Legends of Tomorrow; January 14, 2020
- Based on: Superman (DC Comics) by Jerry Siegel; Joe Shuster
- Adapted by: Greg Berlanti; Andrew Kreisberg; Jessica Queller
- Portrayed by: Tyler Hoechlin; Kevin Caliber (season one; uncredited); Daniel DiMaggio (young; hallucination)

In-universe information
- Full name: Kal-El (birth); Clark Kent (adoptive)
- Alias: Superman
- Species: Kryptonian
- Occupation: Journalist; Superhero
- Family: Jor-El (father); Lara Lor-Van (mother); Zor-El (uncle); Alura Zor-El (aunt); Kara Danvers (cousin); Jonathan Kent (adoptive father); Martha Kent (adoptive mother); Sam Lane (father-in-law); Lucy Lane (sister-in-law)
- Spouse: Lois Lane
- Children: Jonathan Kent (son); Unnamed (son)
- Origin: Krypton
- Abilities: Invulnerability; Superhuman strength, speed, sight, and hearing; Frost breath; Heat vision; X-ray vision; Flight

A version of the character residing on Earth-38 and later on Earth-Prime appears across the fictional universe. He first appeared in Supergirl pilot episode in 2015.

==== Early life ====
Clark was born in 1979 on the planet Krypton into the House of El to his parents, scientists Jor-El and Lara Lor-Van. Shortly after his birth, Krypton was on the brink of destruction so his parents sent him to Earth, along with his 13-year-old cousin, Kara Zor-El. His pod crashed on Smallville, Kansas, where he was found by Jonathan and Martha Kent, and adopted him as their own, while his cousin's pod crashed 24 years later. As a kid, he developed superpowers due to the Sun's yellow radiation. He became a vigilante during his youth, solving crimes with his friend Chloe. Clark felt like a stranger and connecting to the world was tough. As an adult he moved to Metropolis and started working for the Daily Planet where he met Lois Lane. He came head-to-head with numerous supervillains, such as General Zod, Doomsday and Lex Luthor. In 2003, he discovers his cousin's pod and her in it and takes her to the Danvers, whom he trusts to raise her. In 2015 he finally defeats Lex and sends him to prison.

==== Helping Supergirl ====
James Olsen informed Clark that Supergirl was in danger, and he came and saved her from Ben Krull / Reactron and then left to stop a natural disaster. The following day, however, he apologized via chat to Kara for having interfered. Some time later he learnt that Indigo and Non have activated the brainwashing effect of Myriad, he headed to the National City to assist his cousin, Kara Danvers / Supergirl. At his arrival he too became brainwashed, because of the time he had spent taking the yellow Sun's radiation, and fell unconscious. After Kara freed National City from Myriad, Clark remained inactive and was taken into the Department of Extranormal Operations headquarters during his recovery. He later returned to Metropolis after briefly chatting with Kara to thank her.

When the suborbital spacecraft Venture began to crash, Clark went to rescue the people inside. At the accident site he met Supergirl, and together they prevented catastrophe. After saving the day, he went to the D.E.O. and met Mon-El. With him and Kara wondering what happened to the spacecraft, he decides to stay to National City and investigate the situation. Together they first visited Lena Luthor at Luthor Corp, but didn't find any clue. That night Lena's helicopter was attacked by drones, but saved by Superman and Supergirl. The following day, John Corben attacked Luthor Corp with explosives, only for Clark to save the day. After he saw the situation in National City, he opted to stay and help his cousin. Following several preventions of various accidents and crimes, Clark and Kara confront Corben again, but this time he was a kryptonite-powered cyborg called Metallo. After saving Kara from Metallo, they find out that there was another Metallo in Metropolis. Eventually, with the assistance of J'onn J'onzz / Martian Manhunter, Clark defeats the other Metallo. That night, he left for Metropolis.

During the Daxamite invasion, Clark goes to confront Queen Rhea himself, but he is poisoned by her with silver kryptonite. This created a hallucination were Kara was General Zod, resulting in a fight between them. Kara managed to overpower him and Alex Danvers took both of them to the Fortress of Solitude, where they made a planned to end the invasion, by having Kara combat Rhea. Kara won and with the help of a special device, sent the Daxamites back to space. Clark returned to Metropolis.

When the Kryptonian Children of Juru attacked Earth to xenoform it, Clark saved the epicenter of it, Madagascar. Afterwards, Clark decided to take a break from Earth to visit Argo City, taking his partner, Lois Lane, with him. Around this time, Lois became pregnant with a son.

==== Assisting heroes from Earth-1 ====
After Clark, and a now pregnant, Lois Lane return from Argo, they go to his house in Smallville. There, they are visited by his cousin, Kara. Then Barry Allen and Oliver Queen as the Green Arrow and The Flash respectively appear, seeking Kara's help. Barry and Oliver explain their situation and Kara agrees to help them. After some hours, Cisco Ramon / Vibe appears and informs them about A.M.A.Z.O.'s attack to Central City and seeks their help. Clark agrees to join them. After a hard battle between the heroes, A.M.A.Z.O. is defeated as he was exploded by a trick arrow. The heroes thank Clark for his assistance and he returns to his world.

John Deegan, with the Book of Destiny, given to him by the Monitor, rewrites reality. In the new one Barry and Oliver are criminals, while Deegan transformed himself to look like Clark's Superman, but wearing a black suit. Barry and Oliver locate Cisco and persuade him to take them to Earth-38, where they find Clark who agrees to return with them to Earth-1 and stop Deegan. Clark fights Deegan and restores reality. After he returns to his Earth, he takes Lois to the Fortress of Solitude and after dinner, proposes to her, with her accepting. Together they left for Argo.

==== Stopping the Crisis ====
Clark and Lois' peace was disrupted when a wave of anti-matter threatened and destroyed their planet, Argo. Both were teleported by Lyla Michaels / Harbinger, but their son, whom they had placed inside a pod and sent to Earth, went missing. Lyla also brought Oliver Queen / Green Arrow, Mia Queen / Green Arrow, Kate Kane / Batwoman, Sara Lance / White Canary, Barry Allen / The Flash, Ray Palmer / Atom from Earth-1 and together with Clark, J'onn and Kara to fight against the Anti-Monitor's forces. Lois goes with Brainiac and Sara to Earth-16 were Jonathan's pod crushed. There, Lois gets back her son and they all leave back to their universe. Clark and the heroes are unable to stop the anti-matter wave and they all flee with the Waverider and other ships with billions of refugees to Earth-1. In the Waverider he reunites with his family, while observing Oliver's death.

After the Monitor informs everyone of the heroes that there are seven individuals known as Paragons, who can defeat the Anti-Monitor, Clark volunteered to help find the Paragon of Truth. With Lois and Iris West-Allen, they search the Multiverse. In one Earth's Superman, Lex Luthor of their universe, using the Book of Destiny, had killed him, revealing that he is jumping to universes to kill all the Supermen, as one of them should be the Paragon. After that they visit Earth-167, where they meet with that universe's Clark Kent, but Lex, using the Book, kicks them from that Earth, but doesn't kill Clark, as he is powerless. The trio goes to Earth-96, where they meet the editor-in-chief of the Daily Planet, Clark Kent, who had suffered the loss of all of the people he cared for in a terroristic attack at the newspaper, thus making him the Paragon of Truth. In that moment Luthor appeared, using the Book, forcing Earth-96 Clark to attack Clark. They fight, but Lois knocked Lex out, thus Earth-96 Clark came back to his senses. Clark, Lois, Iris and Earth-96 Clark then returned to the Waverider, to join the other heroes. With the team's best efforts failing, the Multiverse is consumed by anti-matter. Then, a mind-controlled by the Anti-Monitor Harbinger appeared on the ship, killing the Monitor. Nash Wells / Pariah then sends the Paragons to the Vanishing Point, though him, Lois, Iris, John Diggle / Spartan, Jefferson Pierce / Black Lightning and Ralph Dibny / Elongated Man are consumed by anti-matter, killing them.

After the fight between the Paragons with the Anti-Monitor and his forces result into victory for the first mentioned, Oliver, now a cosmic being called the Spectre, restarts the Multiverse, combining Clark's Earth, Earth-1 and Jefferson's unnamed Earth forming Earth-Prime, restoring everyone to life, including Clark. The Anti-Monitor survived and attacks the team, only to lose again. After the fight, Barry, Kara, Jefferson, J'onn, Kate and Clark assemble in the Hall of Justice, were they decide to create a new team, the Crisis Team, that will protect Earth from any major threats. As Clark flies back home he is informed by Lois that they have two kids now. At some point, Clark gave Bruce Wayne / Batman a piece of kryptonite to use as a fail-safe in case Clark were ever to become dangerous.

==== Retirement ====
In 2049, when Magog and his team of villains invaded Earth, Bart Allen / Impulse and Nora West-Allen / XS went to Clark, who now lives a peaceful life in Smallville, for help to defeat him. He, instead, told them the story of his first encounter with Lex Luthor, and advised them to face the threat and have confidence in themselves. Later, after Magog's defeat, he joined other superheroes in the Hall of Justice, where Oliver Queen / The Spectre appeared and told them that something more dangerous was coming.

=== Earth-75 ===
A version of the character, residing on Earth-75, is seen when Clark and Lois Lane visit it. This version is killed by Lex Luthor of their world and his death was broadcast globally. He is seen on the second part of the crossover event Crisis on Infinite Earths portrayed by an uncredited Adrian Hein.

=== Earth-99 ===
A version of the character, residing on Earth-99 is mentioned when Kara Danvers / Supergirl and Kate Kane / Batwoman visit it. This version was the protector of Earth, but Bruce Wayne / Batman saw him as a danger. At some point, Batman, using kryptonite, killed him, keeping his glasses as a trophy. He is mentioned in the second part of the crossover event Crisis on Infinite Earths.

=== Earth-167 ===
A version of the character, residing on Earth-167, appears when Clark, Lois and Iris West-Allen visit it. This older version of Clark has been operating as Superman for a long time. He married Lois Lane and together they had two daughters, all living in Smallville, Kansas. During the Crisis, the trio asks for his help, but Lex Luthor of their universe sends them away. Clark and Lex talk and Clark reveals that he has given up his powers in favor of starting a family.

=== Earth-96 ===
A version of the character, residing on Earth-96, appears when Clark, Lois and Iris visit it. This version has been operating as Superman for a long time. He works at the Daily Planet as its editor-in-chief. He had a son named Jason. Clark lost his wife, and all friends and colleagues, when Joker gassed the building of the Planet. Since the incident, Clark has worn an outfit similar to the Kingdom Come version of Superman. The trio meets him and asks for his help, realizing that he is the Paragon of Truth, but then their universe's Lex Luthor appears with the Book of Destiny and brainwashes the Earth-96 Clark to attack Clark. The two fight, but Lois knocks Lex out, stopping the brainwashed Clark. Afterwards, they go to the Waverider, where Earth-96 Clark meets all the other heroes. When Lyla Michaels / Harbinger appears, possessed by the Anti-Monitor, she attacks the heroes and lets the anti-matter wave consume Earth-1, the last one in the Multiverse. Nash Wells / Pariah teleports the Paragons, including Clark, to the Vanishing Point, a place outside time. After the heroes' arrival, Clark falls and disappears as Lex was able to use the Book of Destiny and substitute himself as the Paragon of Truth. After the end of the Crisis, Earth-96 is recreated.

=== Earth-D ===
A version of the character, residing on Earth-D, died when Outkast released some shadow demons, Superman fought them with the Justice Alliance and with other heroes from other Earths. But despite his effort, his Earth was wiped out by a wave of antimatter.

=== Earth-F ===
A version of the character, residing on Earth-F, wore a costume reminiscent of the original Superman suit Martha made for Clark in the Superman & Lois. He died trying to stop a wave of antimatter from destroying his world, despite Pariah's warnings not to touch it.

=== Earth-N52 ===
A version of the character, residing on Earth-N52, was part of a team of superheroes called the Justice League, consisting of Wonder Woman, Green Lantern, and Batman among others. He died alongside his teammates when his world was destroyed in a wave of antimatter.

=== Black Lightning's Earth ===
On an unnamed Earth, Superman was a fictional character before it merged with Earth-Prime. He was loved by its residents including Jefferson Pierce, who kept a photo of him wearing a Superman shirt in his office.

== Reception ==
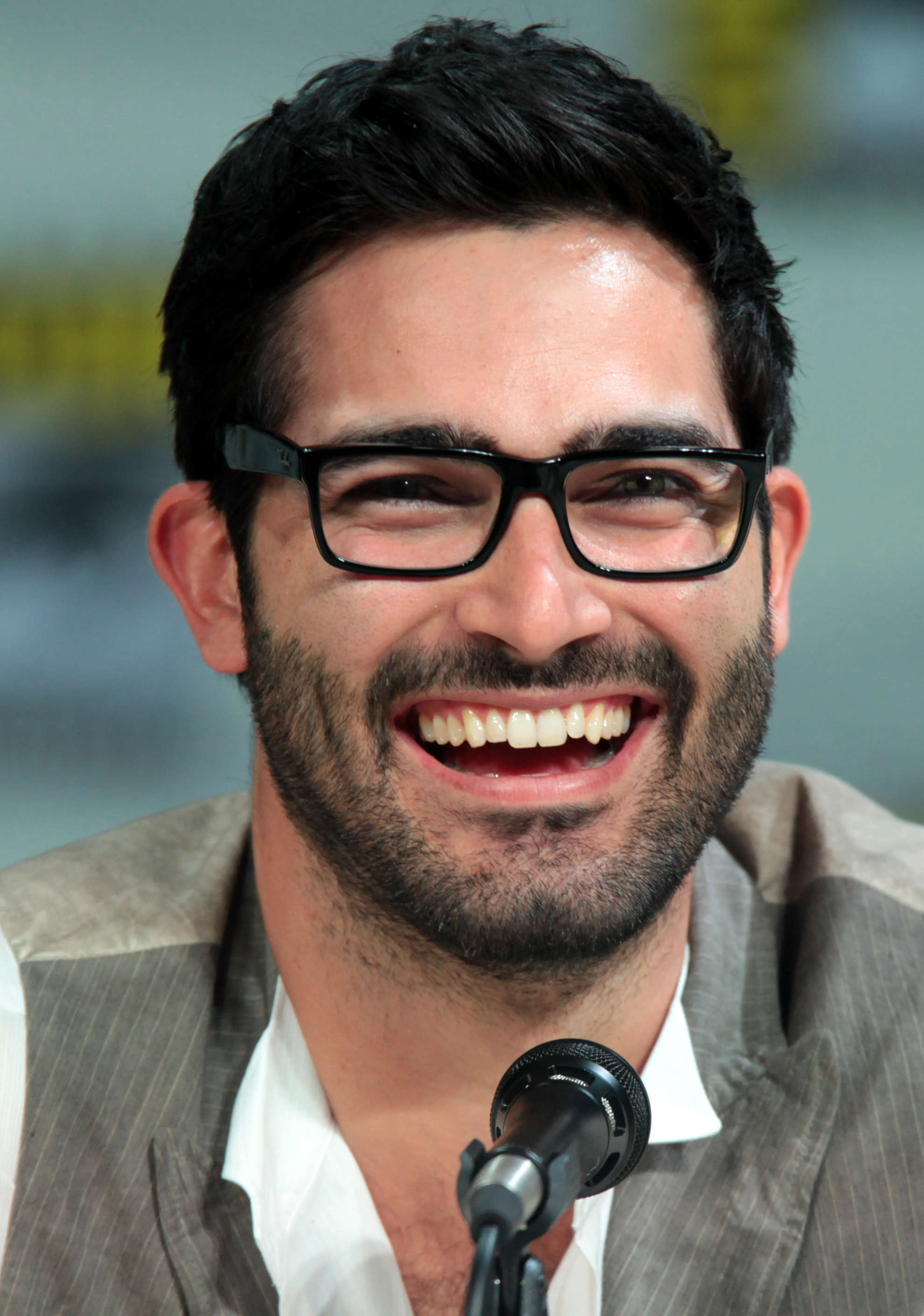
Hoechlin at the 2014 San Diego Comic-Con.

Hoechlin was cast as Superman on the CW show Supergirl in 2016. As producer Greg Berlanti's first choice for the role, he did not have to audition. His portrayal of Superman was well received by fans and critics and described as "fun" and a "breath of fresh air". According to Screen Rant, he is the most comic-book accurate version of Superman, something important among the fans of the character. After the premiere of his own show, Superman & Lois, a debate begun among fans, whether he is better than Henry Cavill's Superman. According to the website, CBR, "Tyler Hoechlin embodies the spirit of Superman better than the Snyderverse's did." Hoechlin's role as a family man in his show was also praised, as something new and fresh. Hoechlin's acting, according to tvsourcemagazine.com, is one of the reasons for the success of the show. According to Radio Times.com "Of course, its been five years since Tyler Hoechlin first debuted as the Man of Steel in sister series Supergirl, so this has been a long time coming. He may lack Christopher Reeve's boyish twinkle, but there's a warm, Golden Age Hollywood quality about him that's perfect for Clark." Polygon.com noted that the CW's version of Superman was able to "resurrect" the character.

=== Accolades ===
Year	Award	Category	Work	Result	Ref.
2017	Saturn Awards	Best Guest Performance on a Television Series	Supergirl	Nominated	

== In other media ==
=== Comicbook tie-ins ===
A six-issue event series titled Earth-Prime was released over the span of three months. The first five issues focus on stories from every show of the franchise, with the last being a crossover event. Earth-Prime #2 was scheduled to be released on April 19, 2022, focusing on Superman & Lois, with Clark appearing also in the final issue. The events of the comicbook are canon to the Arrowverse.

The character is mentioned in six issues of the Supergirl tie-in comic, titled Adventures of Supergirl, and appeared in the crossover's Crisis on Infinite Earths tie-in one, titled "Crisis on Infinite Earths Giant #1". During the later one, Clark joins the Council of Supermen, that aims to stop the Council of Luthors from killing them. The character is then mentioned in the "Crisis on Infinite Earths Giant #2". The events of the first mentioned tie-in comic book take place before season 1 of Supergirl, while for the second mentioned they take place during the second part of the crossover.

== See also ==
- Superman (franchise)
  - Superman (1978 film series character)
  - Superman (DC Extended Universe)
  - Clark Kent (Smallville)
