= Shopaholic =

A shopaholic is someone with a shopping addiction.

Shopaholic can also refer to:

- An informal term for someone with a compulsive buying disorder
- Shopaholic (novels), a series of books written by Sophie Kinsella
  - Confessions of a Shopaholic (film), a 2009 film adaptation of The Secret Dreamworld of a Shopaholic, the first book in the Shopaholic novels series
- Shopahholic (TV series), a Norwegian television series broadcast by TV3
- The Shopaholics, a 2006 Hong Kong film.
