= Confessions of a Shopaholic =

Confessions of a Shopaholic may refer to:

- The Secret Dreamworld of a Shopaholic (2000), the first in the Shopaholic series of novels, also known as Confessions of a Shopaholic
- Confessions of a Shopaholic (film), a 2009 American romantic comedy film based on the Shopaholic series of novels
