= Tyler Hoechlin =

American actor (born 1987)

- Hoechlin in 2026
- Born: Tyler Lee Hoechlin; September 11, 1987 (age 39); Corona, California, U.S.
- Occupation: Actor
- Years active: 1998–present

Tyler Lee Hoechlin (/ˈhɛklɪn/; born September 11, 1987) is an American actor. He initially earned recognition for starring as Michael Sullivan Jr. in the 2002 film Road to Perdition, for which he was nominated for the Critics' Choice Movie Award for Best Young Performer. In television, Hoechlin starred as Martin Brewer on 7th Heaven from 2003 to 2007, and also became known for portraying Derek Hale on Teen Wolf (2011–2014; 2017), Clark Kent / Superman in the CW's Supergirl (2016–2019) and Superman & Lois (2021–2024), and for voicing Sephiroth in the Final Fantasy VII Remake franchise.

== Early life ==
Hoechlin was born in Corona, California, on September 11, 1987, to Lori and Don Hoechlin. He has described his family's ethnic background as "Native American, German, Irish, and some others". Hoechlin has two brothers and an older sister. He graduated from Santiago High School in 2006.

== Career ==
=== Baseball ===
Hoechlin began playing baseball at the age of seven and continued throughout high school, playing in the Area Code Games in 2004 and 2005. He earned a baseball scholarship to Arizona State University, where he played infield; his team made it to the College World Series in Omaha, Nebraska. In 2008, after a year at Arizona State, he transferred to the University of California, Irvine, where he was second baseman for the UC Irvine Anteaters. He also played summer collegiate wood-bat baseball with the Battle Creek Bombers of the Northwoods League.

At first, Hoechlin aimed for a career in baseball, prioritizing it over his acting opportunities, which led him to turn down offers for auditions and meetings (including one with director Francis Ford Coppola), and to decline the role of Emmett Cullen in the Twilight films. However, during his junior year in college, he pulled his hamstring, limiting his ability to play and practice. As a result, he participated in more acting auditions, and eventually, on the advice of his coach, made the decision to pursue acting full-time.

=== Acting ===
As a baby, Hoechlin appeared in TV commercials. This led him to successfully audition at an acting school and obtain an agent. As an older child, his first role (at age 11) was in Happy Haunting, a Disney Sing-Along Songs video. At 13, Hoechlin was selected from among 2,000 auditioners to play Michael Sullivan Jr. in Road to Perdition. Hoechlin was nominated for multiple awards for the role, and won both the Saturn Award for Best Performance by a Younger Actor and the Young Artist Award for Best Performance in a Feature Film – Leading Young Actor. That performance led to him getting the role of Martin Brewer in the television series 7th Heaven in 2003. Initially booked for a two-episode arc, he was promoted to a regular character for the rest of the series.

Hoechlin was nominated for a 2004 Teen Choice Award for Breakout Male Star for this role, and remained a regular cast member for the next four years, garnering further nominations for a Teen Choice Award and a Young Artist Award. The series' producers accommodated Hoechlin's baseball schedule, filming on days he did not have practice or a game, throughout high school and his first year of college.

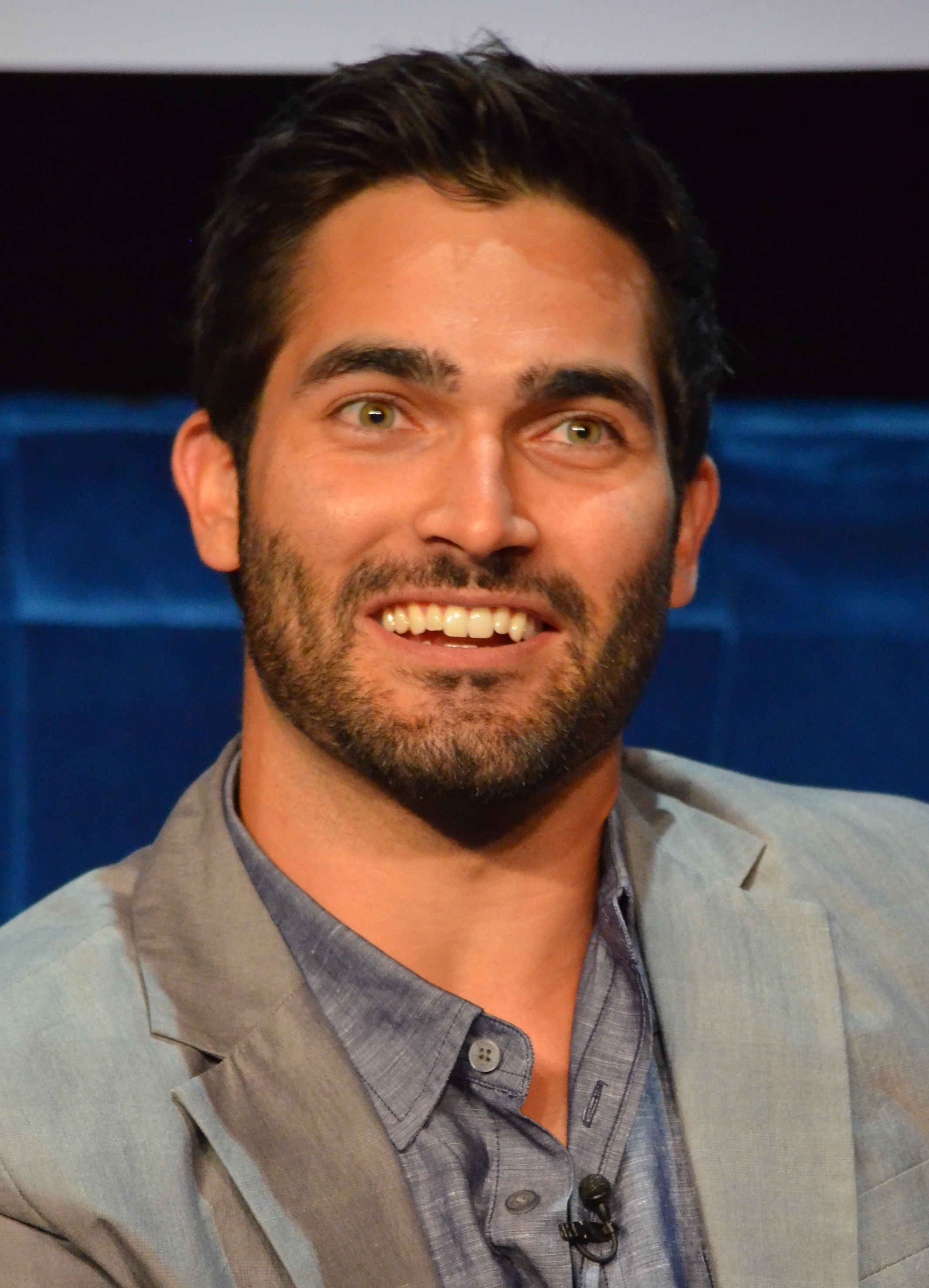
Hoechlin in 2012

After 7th Heaven ended in 2007, he had small roles in other television series, including CSI: Miami, My Boys, and Castle. He also returned to film work, starring in David DeCoteau's Grizzly Rage in 2007 and appearing in Solstice the following year. He also appeared in the 2011 movie Hall Pass.

Hoechlin played werewolf Derek Hale in the television series Teen Wolf. He was a regular on the show for the first four seasons, and returned as a guest star for the sixth and final season in 2017. During the early seasons of the show, filmed in Atlanta, Georgia, Hoechlin lived with co-stars Tyler Posey and Dylan O'Brien. BuddyTV ranked him third on its list of "TV's 100 Sexiest Men of 2011". Throughout Teen Wolf's run, the cast won the Best Ensemble award at the 2013 Young Hollywood Awards and Hoechlin won the 2014 Teen Choice Award for Choice TV Male Scene Stealer.

After leaving Teen Wolf to pursue other work and film roles, Hoechlin was cast in Richard Linklater's baseball comedy Everybody Wants Some!!. To achieve a sense of camaraderie among the cast, they spent three weeks living together at Linklater's ranch while fine-tuning the script. Hoechlin was able to draw upon his baseball experience for the film, in which he played team captain McReynolds. The film was released in 2016 to critical acclaim. That same year, Hoechlin appeared in a second baseball film, Undrafted, which, in contrast to Everybody Wants Some!!, was poorly received by critics. He also appeared in military thriller film Stratton, released in 2017.

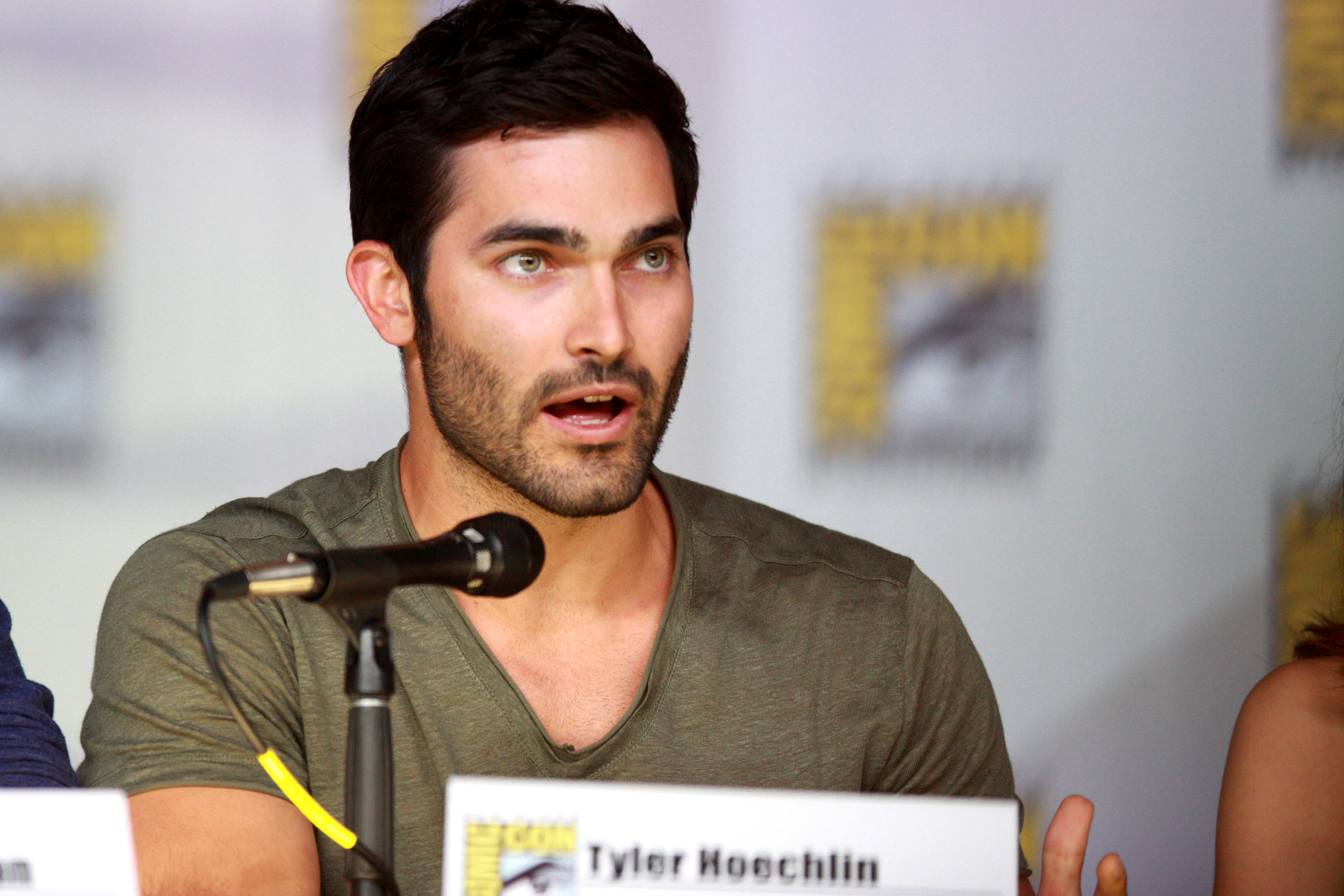
Hoechlin at the 2013 San Diego Comic Con

Hoechlin was cast as Superman on the CW show Supergirl in 2016. As producer Greg Berlanti's first choice for the role, he did not have to audition. Describing the casting as "surreal", Hoechlin said he hoped to successfully embody the optimism of the character and maintain the idea of Superman as a symbol of hope. He appeared in four episodes of the show's second season, and was nominated for a Saturn Award for Best Guest Performance on a Television Series for his work in the role. His portrayal of Superman was well received by fans and critics and described as "fun" and a "breath of fresh air".

In 2018, Hoechlin returned to Supergirl as part of the annual Arrowverse crossover episodes, titled "Elseworlds". He also appeared in the corresponding crossover episodes of both Arrow and The Flash, which all aired in December 2018. Hoechlin returned to the Arrowverse for the "Crisis on Infinite Earths" episodes.

In October 2019, it was confirmed that Superman & Lois, a spin-off series starring Hoechlin and Elizabeth Tulloch, was in development at the CW, which picked it up straight-to-series in January 2020. The series premiered on February 23, 2021, and was renewed for a third season in March 2022.

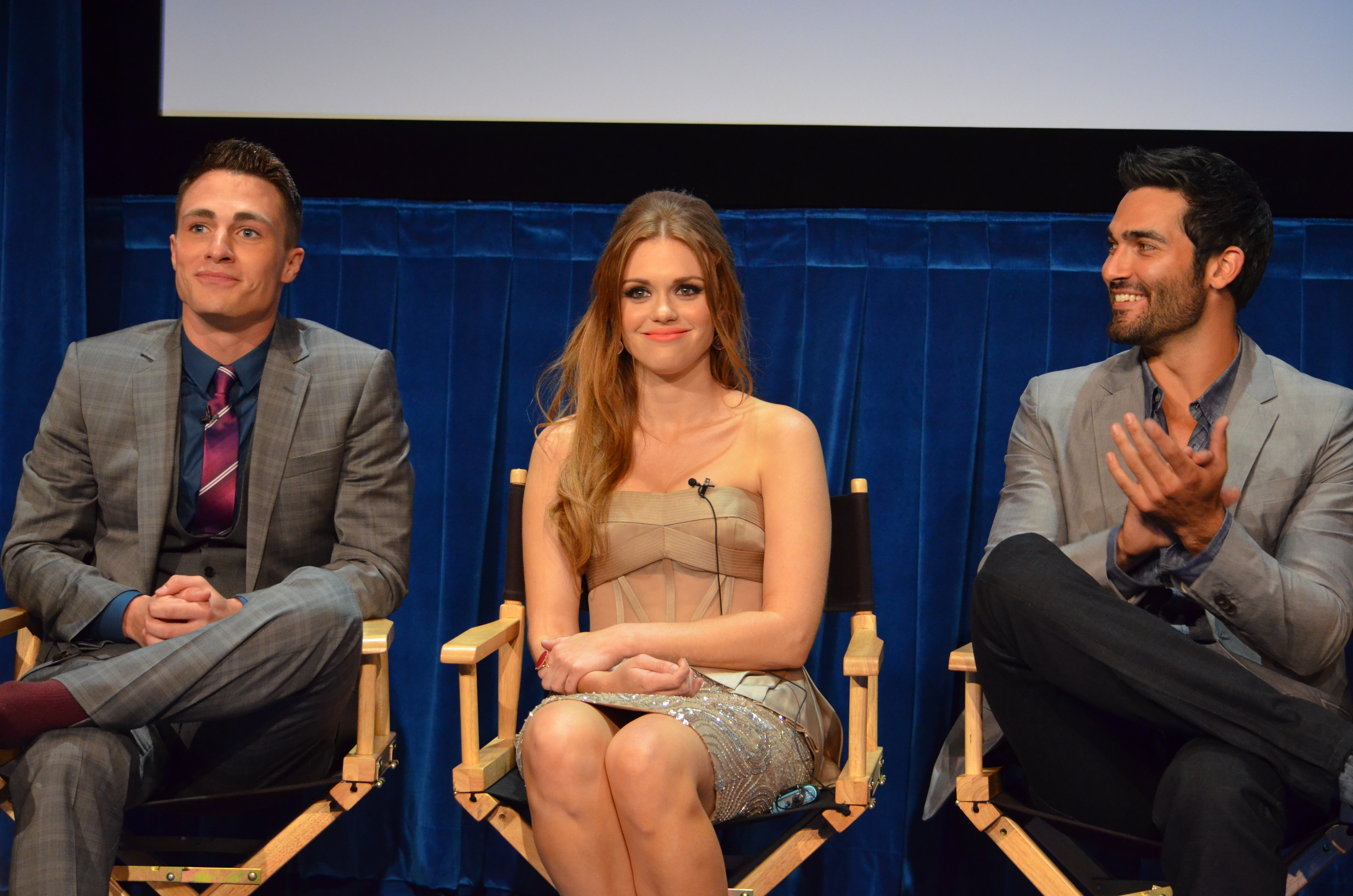
Hoechlin (right) with his Teen Wolf co-stars Colton Haynes and Holland Roden

He was cast in Fifty Shades Darker as Boyce Fox, an author, in early 2016. Hoechlin did not appear in the finished film but did feature in the sequel Fifty Shades Freed, which was released in 2018. The same year, he appeared in The Domestics, a post-apocalytic thriller, which was released on June 28.

Hoechlin starred in George Gallo's Bigger, in which he played Joe Weider. The biopic told the story of the Weider brothers' founding the International Federation of Bodybuilders. Bigger premiered on September 13, 2018, in Las Vegas, in conjunction with the Mr. Olympia competition, and was released to cinemas in October.

The following month, teen drama Then Came You premiered at the Woodstock Film Festival. Initially titled Departures when Hoechlin was cast in February 2017, the film was released theatrically in February 2019.

In July 2019, Hoechlin appeared as Ian Yerxa in the sci-fi drama series Another Life. Two months later, Hoechlin starred in Can You Keep a Secret? as Jack Harper. The film is an adaptation of the novel of the same name by Sophie Kinsella; it began filming in October 2018. In 2020, he was cast as the new voice of Sephiroth for Final Fantasy VII Remake, succeeding George Newbern. Hoechlin reprised the role in Remake's first sequel, Final Fantasy VII Rebirth, but was unavailable for the second sequel, Final Fantasy VII Revelation, and was replaced by Travis Willingham.

In May 2022, he was confirmed to reprise his role as Derek Hale in Teen Wolf: The Movie, for which he also served as a producer.

== Filmography ==
=== Film ===
Year	Title	Role	Notes	Ref.
1998	Disney Sing-Along Songs	Zach	Segment: Happy Haunting – Party at Disneyland!	
1999	Family Tree	Jeff Jo		
2001	Train Quest	Billy		
2002	Road to Perdition	Michael Sullivan Jr.		
2008	Solstice	Nick		
2011	Hall Pass	Gerry		
2011	Open Gate	Kaleb		
2012	Melvin Smarty	Ricky Hershey		
2016	Everybody Wants Some!!	Glen McReynolds		
2016	Undrafted	Jonathan "Dells" Dellamonica		
2017	Stratton	Marty		
2018	Bigger	Joe Weider		
2018	The Domestics	Mark West		
2018	Fifty Shades Freed	Boyce Fox		
2018	Then Came You	Frank Lewis		
2019	Can You Keep a Secret?	Jack Harper		
2020	Palm Springs	Abraham Eugene Trent "Abe" Schlieffen		
2023	Teen Wolf: The Movie	Derek Hale	Also producer	

=== Television ===
Year	Title	Role	Notes	Ref.
2003–2007	7th Heaven	Martin Brewer	Main role (seasons 8–11)	
2007	CSI: Miami	Shawn Hodges	Episode: "Sunblock"	
2007	Grizzly Rage	Wes Harding	Television film	
2009	Castle	Dylan Fulton	Episode: "Fool Me Once..."	
2009	Lincoln Heights	Tad	2 episodes	
2009	My Boys	Owen Scott	Episode: "Spring Training"	
2011–2014, 2017	Teen Wolf	Derek Hale	Main role (seasons 1–4); guest role (season 6)	
2013	The Sticks	Hot Cop Clark Russell	Television film	
2016–2019	Supergirl	Kal-El / Clark Kent / Superman (Earth-38) and John Deegan / Superman	6 episodes	
2017	Hollywood Game Night	Himself	Episode: "Super Smashed Game Night"	
2018–2019	The Flash	Kal-El / Clark Kent / Superman (Earth-38)	2 episodes	
2018–2020	Arrow	Kal-El / Clark Kent / Superman (Earth-38) and John Deegan / Superman	2 episodes	
2019	Another Life	Ian Yerxa	Recurring role	
2019	Batwoman	Kal-El / Clark Kent / Superman (Earth-38) and Kal-El / Superman (Earth-75)	Episode: "Crisis on Infinite Earths: Part Two"	
2019	Match Game	Himself	Episode: "Kenan Thompson / Ellie Kemper / Tyler Hoechlin / Sherri Shepherd / Horatio Sanz / Jillian Bell"	
2020	Legends of Tomorrow	Kal-El / Clark Kent / Superman (Earth-38)	Episode: "Crisis on Infinite Earths: Part Five"	
2021–2024	Superman & Lois	Kal-El / Clark Kent / Superman, Bizarro	Main role	
2025	Impractical Jokers	Himself	Episode: "Dopamine Denier"	

=== Video games ===
Year	Title	Voice role	Ref.
2020	Final Fantasy VII Remake	Sephiroth	
2022	Crisis Core: Final Fantasy VII Reunion	Sephiroth	
2024	Final Fantasy VII Rebirth	Sephiroth	

== Awards and nominations ==
Year	Award	Category	Work	Result	Ref.
2002	Online Film & Television Association Awards	Best Youth Performance	Road to Perdition	Nominated	
2002	Saturn Awards	Best Performance by a Younger Actor	Road to Perdition	Won	
2003	Broadcast Film Critics Association Awards	Best Young Actor/Actress	Road to Perdition	Nominated	
2003	Las Vegas Film Critics Society Awards	Youth in Film	Road to Perdition	Nominated	
2003	Phoenix Film Critics Society Awards	Best Performance by a Youth in a Leading or Supporting Role – Male	Road to Perdition	Nominated	
2003	Young Artist Award	Best Performance in a Feature Film – Leading Young Actor	Road to Perdition	Won	
2004	Teen Choice Awards	Choice Breakout TV Star – Male	7th Heaven	Nominated	
2005	Teen Choice Awards	Choice TV Actor: Drama	7th Heaven	Nominated	
2005	Young Artist Award	Best Performance in a TV Series (Comedy or Drama) – Leading Young Actor	7th Heaven	Nominated	
2008	Fright Meter Awards	Best Supporting Actor	Solstice	Nominated	
2013	Young Hollywood Awards	Best Ensemble (shared with Holland Roden, Crystal Reed, Dylan O'Brien and Tyler Posey)	Teen Wolf	Won	
2014	Teen Choice Awards	Choice TV: Male Scene Stealer	Teen Wolf	Won	
2017	Saturn Awards	Best Guest Performance in a Television Series	Supergirl	Nominated	
2022	Critics' Choice Super Awards	Best Actor in a Superhero Series	Superman and Lois	Nominated	
2022	Saturn Awards	Best Actor in a Network / Cable Series	Superman and Lois	Nominated	
2024	Saturn Awards	Best Actor in a Television Series	Superman and Lois	Nominated	
2025	Critics' Choice Super Awards	Best Actor in a Superhero Series	Superman and Lois	Nominated	
