= Twenties Girl =

2009 book by Sophie Kinsella

- Author: Sophie Kinsella (pseudonym of Madeline Wickham)
- Language: English
- Genre: Comedy, Chick lit
- Publisher: Bantam Press
- Publication date: 16 July 2009 (UK)
- Publication place: United Kingdom
- Pages: 480pp
- Preceded by: Remember Me?
- Followed by: I've Got Your Number

Twenties Girl is a 2009 book by Sophie Kinsella (pen name of Madeline Wickham). Her fourth "stand-alone" book, it was published by Bantam Press.

== Plot ==
Lara is a twenty-seven-year-old woman. At the funeral of her great-aunt Sadie, she gets visited by her ghost, in form of a bold, demanding, Charleston-dancing girl. Sadie has one particular request: she can't rest without her precious dragonfly necklace, and demands that Lara find it for her. But Lara is besieged with problems of her own, such as her uncertain future as co-founder of her own headhunting agency, and the fact that she was recently dumped by Josh, the love of her life.

Pressured by Sadie, Lara sets out to find the necklace. In the process, she learns new information about her uncle’s success, uncovers a long-hidden love story from the past, and becomes involved in a romantic relationship of her own.

In the end, Sadie is finally at peace after Lara finds the necklace and lays it on her 105 year old body.
