= Can You Keep a Secret? (film) =

2019 film by Elise Duran

- Theatrical release poster
- Directed by: Elise Duran
- Screenplay by: Peter Hutchings
- Based on: Can You Keep a Secret? by Sophie Kinsella
- Produced by: Claude Dal Farra; Brice Dal Farra; Brian Keady
- Starring: Alexandra Daddario; Tyler Hoechlin; Sunita Mani; David Ebert; Kimiko Glenn; Laverne Cox; Robert King; Judah Friedlander
- Cinematography: Autumn Eakin
- Edited by: Nathaniel Krause; Jason Nicholson
- Music by: Jeff Cardoni
- Production companies: BCDF Pictures; Embankment Films; 120dB Films; Big Indie Films
- Distributed by: Vertical Entertainment
- Release date: September 13, 2019
- Running time: 95 minutes
- Country: United States
- Language: English
- Box office: $1.4 million

Can You Keep a Secret? is a 2019 American indie romantic comedy film directed by Elise Duran and stars Alexandra Daddario and Tyler Hoechlin. It is based on the 2003 novel of same name by Sophie Kinsella, with the screenplay adapted by Peter Hutchings.

Can You Keep a Secret? was made available through video on demand in North America on September 13, 2019, with a limited theatrical release in foreign markets, where it earned total box office of $1.6 million.

== Plot ==
Emma Corrigan is a New York junior marketing representative at Panda, an organic food company, in Chicago for a sales meeting. The client declines her pitch. Emma gets drunk on the flight home. When the plane hits turbulence, she thinks she will die, and reveals her personal and professional woes to a handsome stranger, including her dissatisfaction with her boyfriend, Connor. Connor meets her at the airport and suggests they move in together. She agrees but regrets it the next morning.

Back at work, Emma prepares for a visit by Panda CEO Jack Harper. When he arrives, Emma realizes he was the handsome stranger from the plane. He agrees not to say anything or fire her, if she in return does not reveal that he was in Chicago.

In a marketing meeting Emma suggests that the target demographic for their "Panda Bites" product line should not be millennials, but the elderly. Connor and other coworkers say the product should simply be axed. Emma later asks Nick, the rep responsible for Panda Bites, for a cut of the marketing budget to test her theory.

Emma calls Connor to the archive room for spontaneous sex in an attempt to reinvigorate their relationship. When he refuses, she breaks up with him. Jack asks her out to dinner and the two begin a passionate relationship. He, however, remains secretive. Emma's roommate and best friend, Lissy, cautions her that their relationship may be too one-sided.

Jack discusses Panda's products on television with the office watching. He describes the company's new target demographic as the "girl on the street", and going into greater detail begins describing Emma, listing all of her secrets. Although he doesn't name her, her coworkers realize it is her and begin mocking her.

Jack realizes too late what he has done, and Emma refuses to take his calls. When he finds her at a coffee shop, she demands to know why he has been going to Chicago. He is reluctant to open up, so Emma leaves. Lissy and their other roommate, Gemma, suggest she get even by revealing his secrets. Gemma suggests a tabloid reporter friend help find details about Chicago but Emma declines.

At a marketing meeting, boss Cybill congratulates Nick for the ad in a magazine for the elderly which has paid off. When he takes all the credit, Emma calls him out, and requests a promotion she was promised, and Cybill agrees.

Jack reveals the reason for his trips to Chicago: he has been working to ensure that his goddaughter stays out of the spotlight after her father's death, so she can have a normal life. Gemma arrives just then with her reporter friend, so Jack leaves in anger. Emma tracks him down on a plane back to Chicago. She assures Jack she told the reporter nothing and expresses gratitude that he loved her when she was her true self. He then begins to reveal all of his secrets to her.

== Cast ==
- Alexandra Daddario as Emma Corrigan
- Tyler Hoechlin as Jack Harper
- Sunita Mani as Lissy
- Laverne Cox as Cybill
- Kimiko Glenn as Gemma
- Bobby Tisdale as Doug
- Kate Easton as Artemis
- David Ebert as Connor Martin
- Robert King as Casey
- Sam Asghari as Omar
- Judah Friedlander as Mick
- James Lipsius as Nick

== Reception ==
=== Critical response ===
Can You Keep a Secret? received predominantly negative reviews from critics. On Rotten Tomatoes the film has an approval rating of 30% based on reviews from 20 critics, with an average score of 4.10/10.

Nick Allen of Roger Ebert.com gave it a 1.5 stars. It said: "“Can You Keep a Secret?” doesn’t elicit warm laughs so much as heavy sighs, even though the film has some zippiness—there’s a slapstick spirit to the movie that doesn’t shine because the jokes are plain, the couple is tough to root for, and the general tension behind this weird situation is on the lazier side of rom-com premises. Romance is hard, and comedy even more so, but “Can You Keep a Secret?” too openly tries to skip through both."

Alan Pergament of The Buffalo News, upon stumbling upon a television rerun of the film, praised the cameo appearance of Kate Welshofer, a WGRZ news reporter who makes a cameo in the film, but panned the remainder of the film, stating that he "bailed" shortly after Welshofer's appearance.

=== Box office ===
Can You Keep a Secret? had a limited theatrical release, only in foreign markets, where it earned total box office of US$1.6 million.
