= Shopaholic and Sister =

Book by Sophie Kinsella

- First edition
- Author: Sophie Kinsella
- Publisher: Bantam Press
- Publication date: 2004
- Preceded by: Shopaholic Ties The Knot
- Followed by: Shopaholic and Baby

Shopaholic and Sister (2004) is a chick-lit novel by Sophie Kinsella, a pseudonym of Madeline Wickham. It is the fourth book in the Shopaholic series. It follows the story of Becky Brandon (née Bloomwood) and her husband Luke as they return from their ten-month long honeymoon.

== Plot synopsis ==
The novel commences with the protagonist, Becky Bloomwood, coming to the conclusion of her extravagant ten-month-long honeymoon around the World with her husband, Luke. Although the newlyweds have been enjoying themselves, Luke and Becky decide it is time to return home to England. Before returning home, the couple embarks upon a brief trip to Milan, where Luke is scheduled to meet with a potential client. After agreeing with Luke that she will not buy anything in Milan, Becky explores the city. She heads to a leather store and manages to buy Luke a new leather belt as a present to him, wanting to replace the one she ruined with the hot wax when she was waxing her legs.

Becky's resolve not to purchase anything for herself is weakened when she sees the opportunity to own an Angel handbag, a popular and expensive purchase. Unfortunately, the clerk tells her that there is a waiting list for the bag. A wealthy businessman, Nathan Temple, overhears the encounter between Becky and the sales assistant. He persuades the sales assistant to sell the handbag to Becky because he and the owner are friends. Becky shows her gratitude by promising to pay him back somehow. When Becky gives Luke the new belt, he is pleased and believes that she has made a sincere commitment to changing her irresponsible shopping habits.

Back in England, Becky and Luke stop to visit the Bloomwood family and surprise them with their early return. Becky is shocked and dismayed when her parents appear to be hiding something. Not only that, but they are not impressed with Becky's gifts and don't seem as excited as Becky had hoped. The next day, Luke and Becky attend the christening of Suze's twins. Unfortunately, Suze has befriended a local woman, Lulu, who is a mother of four children and hopes that she and Becky will like each other. From their first meeting and much to Suze's dismay, Becky and Lulu quickly dislike each other to the point they become enemies. Lulu expresses her belief that she thinks Becky is immature and shallow for her age. Offended, Becky tells Lulu off that she thinks that she is a horse-faced, hypocritical and judgmental person with no interest in getting to know others.

Later on, Suze expresses her concerns with Becky about how she and Lulu treated each other. In turn, Becky admits to Suze that she doesn't like Lulu and the feelings between them are mutual. She also mentions she feels isolated from Suze since she and Lulu have more in common as they have children of their own. In turn, Suze admits her jealousy towards Becky for going on a fabulous 10 month honeymoon around the world, while she was at home with three children. She mentions that Lulu was there to help her cope, but Becky keeps her stance about Lulu and this leads to a fight. She and Suze suffers a falling out between them. After leaving the Cleath-Stuart home, Luke comforts Becky and tells her that no one was expecting them back for another month.

Becky's troubles become worse when two trucks full of her souvenirs she has accumulated from her trip arrive. The bills for them are outrageous and with her new job not due to start for several months, Luke orders Becky to sort things out around the house with her spare time. Luke immediately switches back into business-mode, cutting his hair, becoming more efficient and donning expensive suits. Thinking quickly at her neighbors' suggestion, Becky sells most of her souvenirs off to eBay and makes good money off it to pay Luke back, including the 20 Tiffany clocks (which she accidentally sells off unaware that he bought them as a gift to Arcodas' Group). Luke finds out about the missing clocks from his co-worker who bought it off eBay and is angry with Becky for a while.

Becky's parents arrive with big news. They explain that they did not want to tell Becky initially until she settled down, but she has a half-sister from a previous relationship of her father's, a woman named Marguerite - and whose name is Jessica Bertram, nicknamed "Jess". Becky is ecstatic - she claims that she has felt a hole in her life and has always wanted a sister. She imagines going shopping together, enjoying girls' nights in, and having a new best friend to replace Suze. However, when Becky meets Jess for the first time, she is disappointed right away. It turns out that Jess is studious, thrifty, and a bit standoffish. Jess tries to encourage Becky to save money, but Becky can't comprehend why Jess does not want to do anything fun. When Becky overhears Luke saying that she is hard to live with, she is shocked and thinks that her marriage is falling apart. When Becky asks her parents about it, they reassure her it's her and Luke's first row that all newlywed couples go through and everything will be fine. It does little to reassure her because she also is worried about her lack of bond with Jess.

Jess and Becky suffer a falling-out when they realize they have nothing in common. She also suffers one with Luke when he discovers that she had arranged a meeting for him to see Nathan Temple, whom he's not happy about seeing, and the fact Becky had gotten an Angel handbag. Both spend a few days arguing as he reveals that he thinks Jess is more helpful than she is because he's been trying to win over Arcodas. In anger and tears, Becky tells Luke off that she had a lot of her own problems to deal with the last few months and he never has time for her. He shows a hint of compassion for her, but also tells Becky that he needs time away from her. Luke hopes that in being away from her, Becky will have time to reassess her attitude. After he leaves, she reads down the paper which is a list of complaints Luke has with her and comes to the conclusion that their marriage has fallen apart.

No sooner that Luke leaves for Cyprus, Becky has a hard time adjusting to life in the loft alone and tries to call Suze. It doesn't work as she has an outing planned for her and Lulu's children. Becky then attempts to call her parents for comfort, only to remember they are going on a wellness cruise that will take them out of the country for a month. Becky decides to go to a supermarket to distract her from her thoughts. It fails to do the trick and she goes home to try to get some sleep. Becky soon has a nightmare about transforming into her nemesis, Alicia, donning a fancy suit and a selfish sneer. In her nightmare after hurting Jess, Luke and Suze both reprimand her for her behavior. After that, Becky decides to go to Jess' home in Northern England to learn to be thrifty and make amends with her. Jess wants nothing to do with Becky and wants her to return to London. Her neighbor and shopkeeper, Jim shows compassion and lets Becky stay at his friend's Bed and Breakfast. The next day, she learns about Jess' past from Jim and Becky starts realizing that she had been a spoiled brat all her life. She becomes close friends to his 17-year-old daughter, Kelly, who likes how fashion forward Becky is. When Jess refuses to talk to Becky again, she nearly takes Kelly's advice until Jim convinces her to attend an environmental meeting with them.

During an environmental meeting, Jess finally talks to Becky alone and confesses that she recently did a test for a blood clot. She remembers being told to get tested for blood clots if they were related, but pushed it away in the back of her mind. Becky continues listening as Jess mentioned that she learned more about her mother's flirtatious past from her aunt, Florence, before marrying Bill. Becky realizes she was trying to get a DNA test done for her and Graham. Jess mentioned if he wasn't her father, she could move on and continue finding more potential fathers. Letting the truth sink in that there was no DNA test done and that everyone assumed, Becky concludes that she and Jess may not be related and is heartbroken by this. Realizing the extent in how much she's hurt Jess during her visit in London and how immature she truly is in her behavior, Becky decides to do the right thing and end things on a good note. She makes a heartfelt apology to Jess during her trip in London. She admits that though they may not be sisters, Becky mentions she was right in the end. She kept ignoring Jess's advice to save money and use her tips to be thrifty by continuing to spend on unnecessary items that she doesn't need. In the end, Becky's behavior cost her everything including losing her friends and her marriage to Luke finally fell apart. Jess forgives Becky and wishes her luck in saving her marriage.

Becky returns to her room and begins packing for the return trip home to face Luke. She realizes that in order for her to try to fix their marital problems, she must start accepting responsibility for herself and apologize for her behavior. Robin and a few others from the environmental meeting tries to get her to stay regardless, especially Jim who is concerned for Becky's well-being. Becky appreciates their generosity, but still insists that she return home to fix her marriage. She says her farewell to Jim and Kelly begs her to stay. Becky remains adamant that she must return home to save her marriage and promises Kelly a shopping trip in London. She asks Jim to do her one last favor in delivering a necklace she bought originally for Jess. He convinces her to come with him to Jess's house to do a delivery so she can drop it off herself before returning to London. Still harboring resentment against Jess for ignoring her during her visit to London, Becky believes her to boring and passionless much to Jim's amusement. He decides to show her something to prove Becky wrong about Jess. Jim takes Becky to Jess' house and shows her true passion in a cupboard similar to her shoe collection. However, it is filled with rocks ranging from normal rocks to rare crystals that shine beautifully. In that moment, Becky's resentment disappears and she realizes Jess has something in common with her. Jim explains the whole story about Jess's injury and how she was almost arrested in trying to smuggle a rare rock from another country, but was let off with a warning. As he continued telling the story, Becky quickly feels guilty for insulting Jess's passion in rock collecting by calling it boring and a waste of time. Becky also comes to the realization that going shopping for unnecessary items can be boring, but she had never been able admit it.

Jess has departed on a mountain climb on a gloomy day, and Becky follows to try to catch up and apologize again. Unfortunately, Becky is not only wearing the incorrect footwear, but is also inappropriately dressed to embark upon a hike of that magnitude. She ends up not following the trail and has a nasty fall in dreadful weather. Luckily, Jess has the mental and moral fortitude to watch over her. The two girls reconcile and discover that though their interests are drastically different, they share the same level of passion for their hobbies. Becky admits Jess was originally right about her from the start and that she has been spoiled by her parents all her life. She learns more on Jess' past in her stepfather Bill's harsh upbringing that made her grow up into the woman she is. While she learned to fend for herself and value money at a young age, Becky's parents always paid for everything and thus she never learned how to do either. It resulted in her having to rely on others to help get her out of debt and which continued until Jess finally told Becky it's time to grow up and start being responsible for her actions. She apologizes again for her earlier behavior and insulting her passion for rock collecting after seeing how beautiful it is. Seeing how truly sorry Becky is, Jess forgives her and accepts her as her sister. She finally admits that Becky is only half to blame for her marriage falling apart. She is shocked because she thought it was her own fault that her selfish behavior and irresponsible shopping habits caused the whole mess. Jess admits she had also seen Luke's earlier behavior while she was in London. Worried over their marriage falling apart, she tried to speak up on Becky's behalf because she is also concerned about his coldness over not wanting his wife to help him out with impressing the Arcodas Group as his company's potential client. When Luke didn't listen, Jess saw first hand how neglectful he was in his duties as a husband to Becky and not making time to help her with her own problems when she needed him. She has also witnessed how much he was willing to sacrifice their marriage just to keep working and winning over the new client. To Jess, it was also selfish on his part and warned him not to let the strain in their marriage get worse. Becky is finally able to give Jess the silver bean Tiffany necklace that she bought for her as a gift. Jess loves the necklace and Becky finally saw her real weakness - aside from collecting rocks. Tarquin and Suze arrive with the RAF to rescue Becky and Jess.

The book concludes with Becky finally relishing the pleasures of being thrifty and has finally reconciled with Luke. She and Suze are helping Jess organize a protest against a new shopping mall (which turns out to be one of Luke's new clients). Eventually someone finds Becky's Angel handbag and it is returned to her. She is hesitant to accept it and Suze asks her why, revealing it's a fabulous bag. Becky disagrees and she explains that the bag was the source of all the troubles it caused her when Suze, Jess and Luke turned away from her. Being in Northern England the last couple of days made her realize that she needs to be more responsible for her actions and grow up. Becky decides working on her marriage with Luke, reconciling with Suze and building a relationship with Jess are more important than having the seasons hottest trends. She gives the purse and her make up collection to Kelly. Becky later discovers that she is not only pregnant, but also the public had been misinformed by Robin when Luke explains that the Arcodas Group had no intentions of building a shopping mall in a wildlife area that is protected, and instead has been planning to restore an old building not to far from it for future generations to learn about wildlife conservation.

== Characters Introduced in the Book ==
Nathan Temple: An English businessman who owns Value Motels who helps Becky jump to the head of the waiting list to get an Angel handbag since he and the owner are friends. She pays him back by arranging a meeting with him and Luke in Cyprus. This made Luke very livid with Becky about it, as Temple has been convicted of a crime in the past, but had to attend because Temple will buy out Daily World and he can't afford to insult him. He ends up liking Temple when he learns about his past and how he got that conviction against him in the first place: because he was defending his staff from an abusive drunken guest and things got out of hand.

Jessica 'Jess' Bertram: Becky's older half-sister that her father had with Jess' mother, Marguerite, from a past relationship. She was excited because she always wanted a sister and always dreamed about both of them going shopping together, helping her cope with Suze not being her friend and enjoying girls' night in. She was disappointed when she learns that Jess is thrifty, studious and a bit standoffish. Her passion is collecting rocks, which was one of the issues between her and Becky that lead to a falling-out. Jess tells her that she's a spoiled brat who lived in a fantasy world. In turn, Becky tells her that she thinks she's boring, miserable, thrifty and has no passions in her life. It was those very words she later regretted telling Jess after Jim showed her, the rock collection in a glass cupboard similar to her own shoe collection cupboard. While stuck in a mountain during the storm, Jess reveals that she never intended to be rude to Becky, but was unnerved by her because of her parents' harsh upbringing. They reconcile and Becky learns to enjoy being thrifty. She gives Jess the silver Tiffany bean necklace, which she loves and showed Becky, her rock collection. In Mini Shopaholic, it is revealed that Jess and Tom got married in Chile. They are planning to adopt, though Janice is insistent they have a biological child first, which Becky calls her out for.

Lulu Hetherington: Suze's new best friend and a mother of four. She and Becky have an immediate dislike towards each other. After Lulu insults her for being immature for her age, Becky calls her out for it and insults her back that she thinks of Lulu as a judgmental and horse-faced hypocrite with no intentions of knowing others. Insulted, Lulu and Becky become enemies because of it. She feels isolated when she sees that Suze and Lulu have more in common. Their relationship still hasn't changed a bit with Lulu and Becky still have the occasional insult run-ins. Soon Suze starts to see Lulu for the hypocrite she really is, thanks to some embarrassing photos that Becky had procured from a private investigator and along with the fact that Lulu had been having an affair outside her marriage with Iain Walker, the CEO of the Arcodas Group. It's unknown what happened to her, but it's presumed that Suze ended her friendship with Lulu after realizing how right Becky was not to trust her.

Jim Smith: The owner of Scully Stores who is a friend of Jess' family. He shows Becky all of Jess' rock collection and she immediately regretts what she said about them. Jim also tells her about how harsh Bill was in her upbringing with her brothers and the way they valued money because of it. After learning from him that Jess paid her way through school, Becky comes to the realization that her parents didn't teach her how to value money at a young age and thus she wound up needing others to pay her debts.

Kelly Smith: Jim's teenaged daughter, who immediately takes a liking to Becky as she's fashion forward. She becomes a supporting friend to her, during her short and brief time in Scully. Becky gives her an entire collection of Stila cosmetics and promises her a shopping trip at Topshop.

Robin: The kind-hearted and firm leader of the environmental protest group who Becky befriends. Robin listens to her suggestions for more media attention and a public rally. He and the other protesters likes the idea of it, but Jess is against it for a reason. When she tried to get Robin to make Becky leave by pointing out what she's really like on the inside, he ignores Jess and insisted she stay there. He tells her that the environmental meeting is no place to take out personal family issues. Robin also tells Jess that Becky has good ideas that he finds helpful and refreshing over her own monotone, tactical opinions. He's later revealed to have misinformed the public about the Arcodas Group's intentions to build a shopping mall in a wildlife protected area when Luke showed up to confront them.

== Shopaholic Series ==
- The Secret Dreamworld of a Shopaholic (2000) also published as Confessions of a Shopaholic (2001)
- Shopaholic Abroad (2001) also published as Shopaholic Takes Manhattan (2002)
- Shopaholic Ties The Knot (2002)
- Shopaholic & Sister (2004)
- Shopaholic & Baby (2007)
- Mini Shopaholic (2010)
- Shopaholic to the Stars (2014)
