= Becky Bloomwood =

Rebecca "Becky" Bloomwood Brandon
- First appearance: The Secret Dreamworld of a Shopaholic
- Last appearance: A Christmas Shopaholic
- Created by: Sophie Kinsella
- Portrayed by: Isla Fisher

In-universe information
- Nicknames: Becky, Bex, Bexter
- Gender: Female
- Occupation: Former Financial Journalist; Television Personality on "Morning Coffee"; Personal Shopper at Barneys; Current personal shopper at "The Look"
- Spouse: Luke James Brandon (2002-present)
- Children: Minnie Brandon (b. December 2003); Unborn baby Brandon (b. tba)
- Relatives: Jane and Graham Bloomwood (parents); Jessica "Jess" Bertram Webster (paternal half-sister); Ermintrude Bloomwood (fictional aunt); James Brandon (father-in-law); Elinor Sherman (mother-in-law); Annabel Brandon (step-mother-in-law); Zoe (half-sister-in-law); Sylvia (aunt); Ernest "Ernie" Cleath-Stuart (god-son); Tom Webster (half-brother-in-law)

Rebecca Jane "Becky" Brandon (née Bloomwood) is a fictional character and the main protagonist from the Shopaholic series of novels by British author Sophie Kinsella. She has been described by Bustle as "fiction's most famous fashionista".

== Personal life ==
Becky grew up in Oxshott, Surrey with her parents. After attending Bristol University, she moved to London. She first lived with her best friend Susan "Suze" Cleath-Stuart in Fulham before she eventually moved to New York City. Prior to moving to New York, she worked as a personal finance expert on a finance magazine called 'Successful Saving' and on the TV show Morning Coffee.

Becky met her husband, Luke Brandon, CEO of Brandon Communications (a public relations firm), during a press conference while she was working as a financial journalist for 'Successful Saving' magazine. She attracted his attention after she published an article about one of his clients. They appeared on television together and then began dating. They faced many obstacles which takes place in Manhattan. Then, Luke and Becky were married in America on June 22, 2002, and also in England at Becky's parents' house on June 23, 2002. After just over a year of marriage, Becky and Luke have a daughter named Minnie Brandon, who was born on December 3, 2003.

== In literature ==
=== Confessions of a Shopaholic ===
In The Secret Dreamworld of a Shopaholic (also known as Confessions of a Shopaholic in the US), Becky works as a financial journalist. Although she has significant debts, such as an overdraft and credit card debt, nothing stops her from purchasing new clothes, shoes, and other things, which she purchases impulsively. As a result, her flatmate and best friend, Susan Cleath-Stuart (commonly referred to as Suze), has to keep an eye on her spending. On the other hand, Suze knows that Becky does not have enough money to pay her share of the council tax and even tears up a cheque written by Becky. Becky meets PR mogul Luke Brandon of Brandon Communications.

While hiding away in Surrey, Becky discovers her kindly neighbors, Martin and Janice, are facing financial trouble due to an absentminded advice she gave them involving Flagstaff Life's takeover. Her boss, Phillip, Alicia, and even everyone talked about it, but she had hardly been paying attention and was more focused on doing her nails. Feeling guilty for her culpability in making Martin and Janice miss out on thousands of pounds in a windfall resulting from a bank takeover, Becky sets out to make things right. She writes an article for The Daily World that exposes Flagstaff Life's duplicity in defrauding their customers. The article is a success, and leads to Becky appearing on a daytime television show, The Morning Coffee. Unfortunately, Becky did not know that the bank was a client of Luke Brandon's PR firm. Luke is angry with her, believing she wrote the article just to get back at him for treating her poorly at Harrods. Becky and Luke square off during her appearance on The Morning Coffee. After successfully convincing Luke about Flagstaff Life's defrauding their customers, he concedes that she was right. He announces that Brandon Communications will no longer be representing that bank.

At the end of the first book, Becky is offered a regular spot on a hit morning TV show as a financial advice guru, and she helps a caller with her financial problems. Becky finally faces Derek Smeath and asks him to help her with her financial problems. She also begins dating Luke, and they spend the night at the Ritz Hotel.

Becky Bloomwood frequently faces financial trouble because of her shopping habits. While she struggles with debt, the plot usually involves her finding ways to resolve those problems, often helping her friends and family at the same time. When she is focused on shopping, the stories emphasize her loyalty to her family and friends. This combination of traits has made her a popular character with readers of the Shopaholic series.

=== Shopaholic Takes Manhattan ===
In Shopaholic Takes Manhattan (also known as Shopaholic Abroad in the UK), Becky goes to New York City with her then-boyfriend Luke, leaving Alicia in charge of Brandon Communications in London, to Becky's dismay. She shows up in Manhattan to loads of wonderful TV offers, but before she left for the States, she'd visited Brandon Communications and had a sneaking suspicion she left something behind. Overwhelmed by Barney's, Fifth Avenue, and the discovery of sample sales, she goes overboard, even for her. Meanwhile, Luke is dismayed to find out that some of his investors are a little shaky, and he's spending all of his time reassuring them. But when they find out that Alicia has not only tried to take over the company, but stolen Becky's bills and sent them to the Daily World, outing her as a Shopaholic to the fans of Morning Coffee (to whom she gives financial advice), she loses her gig on the TV show and all American TV prospects, and Luke's investors back away entirely. After a huge row in Manhattan, during which Becky refers to his beloved birth mother Elinor as a "cow of a mother", it seems they've lost each other. However, Becky has one trick up her sleeve and manages not only to save her reputation, but also Luke's when she exposes Alicia and Ben's plans to Michael Ellis (which leads to Ben, Alicia, and Alicia's co-conspirators not only being fired, but also facing embezzlement charges). She also secures a job in New York as a personal shopper at Barneys, even as Luke begs her to take a job with Brandon Communications London.

=== Shopaholic Ties the Knot ===
In Shopaholic Ties the Knot Becky agrees to let her neighbor Danny Kovitz, a fashion designer who currently lives with (read: sponges off) his brother and who has blown every opportunity that's come his way so far, design her bridesmaid dress for Suze's wedding to Tarquin. Worrying that Luke will take this as pressure to marry, she blithely tells him that she will not be prepared to marry for ten years. Danny, after stalling and asking such questions as, "Do you need the dress TODAY today?" whips together a gorgeous dress and secures a promise from Becky that should she marry, he'll design the dress. Luke isn't fooled for a moment by her "ten-years" plan and puts an engagement ring inside the bouquet that she catches at Suze's wedding; she is only too happy to accept. Meanwhile, Luke is still determined to win the love of his birth mother, Elinor, and is over the moon about her offer to throw them a wedding at the plaza...despite the fact that Becky's mother had thrown herself and all her friends into wedding preparations immediately after their engagement. Becky spends a good portion of the book trying to tell one or the other that her wedding will be in NYC at the Plaza or in Oxshott at her parents’ home, much to Suze's dismay, Becky can't quite seem to make up her mind: do it at the Plaza and please Luke, and also have the wedding of her dreams, or do it in Oxshott with the family she adores. At the same time, Luke is spending too much time with Elinor's charity—he's assigned a member of his staff to work with Elinor full-time on her charity, insisting it will be good PR for Brandon Communications, despite his partner Michael's severe reservations. Becky insists he's being taken advantage of, and that Luke is so desperate to impress Elinor, he won't let himself see it. When Becky finds press of Elinor, claiming total credit for all the work her charity has done, she reluctantly shares the information with Luke. She later confronts his mother for her behavior in the way she mistreated Luke all of his life and will not stand by anymore to let him take it. Elinor is offended and calls Becky out for insulting her, believing her to be unworthy of her son's love. She warns Becky if she turns down the wedding at the Plaza, she will have to pay the fine. Becky refuses to back down and bargains with Elinor in exchange that she writes an apology letter to Luke and confess to her wrongdoing.

Suze, in the meantime, is insisting Becky pick a location for her wedding...and gets so upset with Becky's indecision—she tells Michael and Suze lamely that "it'll work itself out"—and Suze is so fed up and anxious she goes into premature labor. Throwing her entire life to the wind, Becky stays with Suze for the first two weeks of her godson Ernie's life plans her dream wedding to Luke Brandon- one in Oxshott, planned by her own parents, and the other in Manhattan, planned by Luke's cold mother, Elinor. After Luke and his mother have a final confrontation, it seems like Becky's miracle has happened.

Meanwhile, Becky must assist Laurel, a longtime client of hers who suspects her ex-husband, Bill, has been stealing her family's antique jewelry collection (including an Emerald pendant her grandmother gave her) and been giving it to his much younger girlfriend, Amy Forrester. She goes undercover and confirms this to Laurel. Becky is able to help her get her jewelry back and force both Bill and Amy to apologize for their wrongdoing. Grateful, she offers Becky anything she wants and she comes up with an idea. Coming up with an exquisite plan that only Becky Bloomwood could come up with, she saves the day for everyone. She and Luke pretend to marry at the Plaza hotel and then flies off in Laurel's private jet to Oxshott to marry at home. In the process, she sets up Michael with a woman he can truly love, and sets off Danny Kovitz's astronomical career as well. Becky also surprises Luke with a ten-month honeymoon trip around the world after cashing in her New York wedding gifts.

=== Shopaholic on Honeymoon ===
Becky and Luke are in Venice. Luke is furious when he discovers that Becky had bought 12 expensive Murano wine glasses and attempted to remind her that they already have 12 expensive glass dishes they bought the other day that they had sent home. She tries to convince him that she just wanted it to match the wine glasses just in case they host a party. Luke reminds Becky that they need to be careful in their spending while on their honeymoon and of which she promises to do from now on. They head over to an art museum, which Becky is more than pleased to visit due to it not being like the Guggenheim museum in New York.

=== Shopaholic & Sister ===
The novel commences with newlywed Becky enjoying her 10-month-long honeymoon around the World. When she visits Milan, Italy, Becky shops while Luke meets a new client. After promising her new husband that she will not buy anything, she explores the city with the intention of purchasing a gift for Luke. Becky purchases a new leather belt, wanting to replace the one she ruined when she was waxing her legs with the hot wax. Her resolve wanes when she encounters the chance to purchase an Angel handbag. Unfortunately, Becky cannot purchase it immediately because there is a wait list. Nathan Temple, a customer at the shop, helps jump Becky to the top of the waiting list because he and the owner are friends. She promises to pay him back someday and gives Luke the new belt. He is pleased with the belief Becky has changed and apologizes for his quick judgment. Upon coming home, she discovers to her disappointment that no one was happy to see her and Luke back, but also her parents appear to be hiding something. While she was away, Suze had found herself a new best friend in Lulu whom doesn't really like Becky, and the feelings appear quite mutual. After a confrontation with Lulu, Becky feels more isolated from her best friend since the two women have more in common. Luke comforts her and admits that no one was expecting them back for another month. Becky's problems become worse when two truckloads of her souvenirs show up at their loft, and the bills are outrageously expensive. At first, Luke appears to be mildly amused by what Becky has purchased from all over the World. Eventually, it becomes obvious that there is not sufficient space for all of Becky's purchases. She promises Luke that she will arrange things properly.

As Becky's new job is not scheduled to commence immediately, Luke orders her to sort everything out in her spare time. Taking the advice of her kindly neighbors, Becky uses eBay in order to sell most of the items to make most of the money back to pay Luke back. She also accidentally sells 20 Tiffany clocks (which were meant as a gift for the Arcodas Group). When Luke discovers Becky's mistake from his co-worker who bought the clocks for a cool 20k pounds, he is cross with her careless attitude, and they go days without talking to each other. The Bloomwoods come for a visit and are ready to tell Becky the news. They wanted to wait until she settled back home before revealing important news to their daughter. Becky learns that she has an older half-sister named Jessica because her father had a relationship with another woman named Marguerite. Graham explained that they had a relationship before she met another man named Bill Bertram, who was an owner of a grocery store in Cumbria, and married him. Excited at the prospect of having a sister, Becky thinks that Jessica will be exactly like her, will share a similar passion for shopping and watching films, and even help her cope with Suze no longer being her friend. Becky is disappointed when she initially meets Jess, who is thrifty, environmentally friendly, and a bit standoffish. Jess lacks enthusiasm when Becky gives her a gift.

After a heated confrontation with her sister, Becky faces marital problems with Luke whom is displeased with the way she's behaving and has found out that she set him up for a meeting with Nathan Temple. While both of them spend a few days fighting with each other, Becky feels insulted when Luke talks highly of Jess for being more helpful than her. She is angry and in tears, and Becky tells him off, saying that she has had many of her own problems the last few weeks and he never had time for her. Despite showing compassion for her, Luke maintains he needs time away from Becky and hopes that while he's away, she can reassess her behavior. After he leaves, Becky reads from a paper which compiles a list of complaints Luke has with her and concludes that her marriage has fallen apart. She tries to call Suze, but she is too busy with Lulu in planning an outing for their children. Next, Becky attempts to call her parents for comfort, only to remember that they're going on a wellness cruise.

After a trip to the supermarket fails to distract Becky from her thoughts, she tries to sleep it off on her first night in the loft alone. Soon she has a nightmare about transforming into her nemesis, Alicia, that makes her realize what she has done. Becky heads to Scully in Northern England to reconcile with Jess and learn how to be thrifty. Jess initially refuses to help out after her behavior in London, but Jim offers her a place to stay at his friend's bed and breakfast. While in Scully, Becky befriends Jim's teenage daughter, Kelly, and she becomes a supporting friend similar to Suze. Learning more from Jim about her sister's past under Bill's harsh upbringing, Becky finally realizes that Jess had been originally right about her being a spoiled brat all her life. After failing to talk to Jess, Kelly suggests that she forget about her and believes they're nothing alike. Becky almost takes her advice, but Jim convinces her to come with his family up to an environmental meeting. At an environmental meeting, she befriends Robin and other protesters, and they like her ideas for more media attention. However, Jess is against it and wants Becky to leave. Robin insists that she stays because he and the other protesters feel that she has better ideas and the meeting is no place for personal family issues. While talking to Jess alone, Becky discovers that she recently had a test done for a blood clot from an accident she had years earlier. Becky is shocked by this, but then recalls that she was told to get tested by Jess if they were related, something that she pushed to the back of her mind. Jess admitted that after learning more about her mother, Marguerite's flirtatious past from her aunt, Florence, she was really seeking a DNA test between her and Graham before finding more potential fathers. Becky concludes that since there was no DNA test done, along with everyone else assuming, she and Jess may not be related and is heartbroken by this. Becky realizes how much she's hurt Jess with her earlier behavior in London by acting like a brat, that she shouldn't leave without at least taking responsibility for her actions and trying to reconcile as friends. She makes a heartfelt apology to Jess for her earlier behavior and admits she was right. Becky's behavior compounded more problems than solutions, and her marriage to Luke finally fell apart. Jess forgives Becky and wishes her the best of luck in saving her marriage. Back at her room, Becky ponders what to do as she packs her bags for the return trip home. Without Suze to help her cope, Danny, promoting his fashion line by making appearances in Europe on the catwalk, and her parents being away, Becky must find a way to save her marriage on her own. Robin and the other protesters beg Becky to stay and help them, but she refuses and tells them she must return home. Jim tries to convince her to stay and sincerely admits he is concerned about her well-being and having a mental breakdown while she's alone in London. He believes that by helping the protesters out in getting more media coverage, it could distract her from her problems at home. Becky appreciates Jim's concerns, but remains resolute in returning home to save her marriage to Luke.

Before leaving, Becky sees Kelly for the last time and begs her to stay. She refuses, mentioning that there are more important things she needs to do at home in London. Becky promises Kelly a shopping trip in London when she and her family come for a visit. On a delivery trip, Jim shows Becky Jess's rock collection and tells her the story about everything. This made her resentment not only disappear, but also made Becky feel guilty for the way she hurt Jess by insulting her passion for rock collecting. She also comes to the realization that shopping for unnecessary items can be boring as well, but has never admitted it until now.

Becky follows Jess to the annual hiking trip to apologize again, finally realizing that Jess is exactly like her and shares the same level of passion in spite of their different hobbies. Unfortunately, she is not only wearing the incorrect footwear for such a long hike, but also inappropriately dressed as well. Becky doesn't follow the trail and gets injured. Luckily for her, Jess has the mental and moral fortitude to help her. Becky reconciles with Jess when she admits to how she had seen the beauty of her rock collection and the passion she holds for them. Jess tries to deny it, but Becky admits that she hides the passion better. She admits that when it comes to shopping, Becky has a harder time hiding it when it comes to clothes and other unnecessary items. It was also there that Jess finally tells Becky that she is only half to blame for the marriage falling apart and also reveals Luke's part of the damage because he was so busy trying to win over the new clients that he ignored her needs. Jess then asks about Suze; Becky admits she had found a new friend, and her other friend, Danny, is too busy that she has no friends. Jess discredits that claim and admits that Becky has her as a friend and sister. Jess finally agrees to help Becky learn how to be thrifty and loves the silver Tiffany bean necklace she gave her.

At the hospital, Becky manages to reconcile with Luke, who reveals that he was quite angry with her for having set up a meeting with Nathan Temple behind his back, and admits she was originally right about Temple. He promises to work out their marriage together. Becky also reconciles with Suze, who admits that, while she still likes having Lulu around, she also misses the fun in being best friends with Becky. At the end, Becky enjoys being thrifty and learns of her pregnancy.

=== Shopaholic & Baby ===
In Shopaholic & Baby Becky is going through the joys of expecting her first child, complete with shopping for a baby and a new home. However, there is only one problem: she is going to Dr. Braine, a family obstetrician who has seen previous Brandon women's pregnancies, and whom Becky doesn't like going to. During a shopping trip to Bambinos, she overhears a conversation between other women about Venetia Carter, a celebrity obstetrician to whom she wants to go. After convincing Luke to see her, Becky discovers why he is uncomfortable with changing obstetricians. Venetia is his ex-girlfriend from his university days, but Becky doesn't think much of it when she reassures them that she's seeing someone else. She suspects that Luke is having an affair with Venetia, particularly after Venetia herself tells Becky as much. After she persuades Becky that she and Luke are seeing each other and their relationship was like Penelope and Odysseus. She asks Luke if he's having an affair with Venetia. He denies this and admits the truth to Becky about his ex-girlfriend. Realizing the truth and feeling bad for wanting to change obstetricians, she apologizes to Luke for her behavior. They agree it's in the best interest of their baby to return to Dr. Braine. During that time, Becky still has issues with Suze's best friend, Lulu, and discovers a couple of photos that reveal her for the hypocrite she is from a PI she hired in secret to keep an eye on Luke and Venetia. During her baby shower, Becky shows Suze the photos of Lulu's own problems with her children, and she sees her for who she is. However, Suze refuses Becky's request to publish an article exposing Lulu in the British tabloid "The Daily World", and prefers to keep the photos safe so she can look at them in secret.

Becky learns about Arcodas Group's CEO, Iain Walker, who is making horrible rumors about Brandon C's reputation and threatening to leave. She later receives photos from the same PI of him being in the company with other women, including her current obstetrician. At first he thought he was photographing Luke, but when Becky points Luke out in the background, the PI gets angry at his son. The PI's son defends himself by admitting he had actually been following Iain and Venetia for a while because of possible rumors that they're planning something bad for Brandon Communications. Overhearing this, she suspects that Venetia is helping Iain ruin Brandon C's reputation in her latest attempt to get Luke to leave Becky. She shows the photos of Iain and Venetia together to Luke, but refuses to answer him about where she got them from (possibly feeling bad for suspecting Luke of having an affair with Venetia).

Near the end, Luke rebukes Venetia for what she did to Becky and tells everyone about her troublesome nature. Back in college, Venetia feigned a pregnancy in her attempt to keep them in a relationship together. Though he was relieved that she wasn't pregnant, Luke was still infuriated with Venetia's behavior and ended their relationship. In a last-ditch effort, she tries to convince Luke to leave Becky, calling her a "dim-witted little airhead" who doesn't deserve him. Furious with the insult, he refuses and tells Venetia off that he loves his wife, and there's nothing she can do to change that. Luke states that Becky may shop at times, but he sees her as a caring and intuitive person, whereas he sees Venetia as a lying and manipulative person. In that moment, Becky informs Luke they lost out on the house they were planning to buy and are effectively homeless. Suze offers them her family's unused summer home in Scotland, but the Bloomwoods insist that Luke and Becky stay in their home in Surrey. In the midst of the arguing and being homeless, Becky's water breaks and she goes into labor. Her furious mother, Jane, rebukes Venetia for her mistreatment towards her daughter and orders her out of their lives. Once she's gone, Suze reveals her plans to tell "The Daily World" about Venetia in the hopes of helping her friends and other pregnant women avoid getting her. During that time, a family member calls Dr. Braine in to assist Paula with Becky's labor. Through her professional and personal woes, Becky happily ends the book as a new mum to her daughter Minnie. Luke and Becky temporarily move in with her parents after losing out on the home they hoped to buy, while Luke works to save his company.

=== Mini Shopaholic ===
In Mini Shopaholic, Minnie is now 2 years old. There is a major financial crisis, and after Minnie's christening is a bust, Becky decides to throw a surprise party for Luke's birthday. However, many doubt she can keep the party a secret. Meanwhile, Jess and Tom secretly marry in Chile, and Janice is trying to get them to have children. Minnie is going off the rails, and their fifth proposed house purchase has fallen through, and, as it turns out, Jane is anxious for them to leave, so she can have her house back. Luke and Becky agree that Luke won't buy a new car and, seeing his willingness to sacrifice, Becky agrees to wear every single item in her wardrobe three times before shopping for anything new. Meanwhile, Becky is also trying to persuade Luke to have another baby, but he refuses because of Minnie's increasingly bad behavior. Any old reason is good enough for Becky to want another child; she sees some pom-pom hats and wants them to be known as the children in the pom-pom hats, much as she herself wanted to be known as The Girl in the Denny and George Scarf, or The Girl With the Angel Bag. Becky also faces estrangement from her own parents after an argument she has with them. One such argument involves a disagreement that she had with Graham and Jane while discussing Minnie's behavior. They both suspect that Becky is being selfish in not accepting responsibility for her own actions that lead to Minnie's bad behavior, which she denies. Graham and Jane also think she's interfering with their lives by inviting herself when they want privacy with each other. After being fed up with Becky's irresponsibility and inability to deal with her problems, she, Graham, and Jane have their first serious row and go weeks without speaking to each other, even when Jess has to battle Janice for trying to give Tom libido-induced teas and other methods to make them have a child.

Becky still has issues with Elinor whom wants to see Minnie, but soon she recognizes some similarities between them. She tries to warn Luke that they are behaving similarly to his mother in keeping her away from Minnie. He staunchly denies it, admitting that he is furious with Elinor about a comment she made about Annabel before her death and the terrible mistreatment that she gave Becky over the years. She eventually reconciles with Elinor after she insists on helping out with the party, which by now is in shambles. Elinor also finally accepts responsibility for her actions in selfishly abandoning Luke, and in a moment of extreme vulnerability, refers to Annabel as "his real mother". Becky asks Elinor for help in assessing Minnie's bad behavior, and she agrees.

Still worried about Minnie's wild behavior, Luke (without consulting Becky) hires Nanny Sue, a nanny with her own TV show, who goes into people's homes and they wind up "sobbing on her shoulder and asking, 'Nanny Sue, how can we be better people?'" When Becky comes home and finds out what he did, she is infuriated with Luke because he didn't consult with her first about it. She admits that she had been talking to Elinor about similar problems with Minnie. This angers Luke, for he didn't want his mother to have anything to do with them after what she did in insulting both Becky and Annabel. Before a fight could break out, Nanny Sue calls them to their senses and makes a surprise assessment. She identifies both Luke's fears about having a second child and his issues with his mother, Elinor. Nanny Sue admits that she secretly went undercover to observe the family's behavior at a mall they went to, even before she was called in to assess Minnie's behavior. Becky and Luke are both shocked by this confession since they didn't know that she had gone undercover beforehand. Luke is relieved when Nanny Sue tells him that she knew he had nothing to do with it because he tried hard not to spoil his daughter. She also admits she must confront Becky as a favor to Graham and Jane, revealing they're the ones who called her. She is nervous when Nanny Sue admitted that she had observed Becky's own behavior in a toy store and suspected she was responsible for Minnie's bad behavior. Her buying designer clothing, fighting with Minnie for an expensive toy pony that she wanted so bad and her refusal to let go of it, proved Nanny Sue's point. Becky defended herself by admitting she had originally refused to buy it for Minnie and angrily tried to remind her about the financial trouble she and Luke are both in. While Nanny Sue agreed, she mentioned it didn't excuse the fact that when she caved in, it further supported her suspicion. She makes Becky see that in her spoiling Minnie too much: she played a serious role in her bad behavior. Nanny Sue is the first person to ask Becky if she's considered the possibility she might have a shopping addiction. Becky tries to deny it, claiming she doesn't have an addiction, much to Nanny Sue's amusement. However, Minnie's piped-up comments about items do nothing to dissuade anyone of that notion and further humiliates her. Feeling betrayed by her own daughter, Becky finally admits that she does have an addiction and had a hard time learning when to stop. She also realizes that her own inability to take responsibility for her actions is what led to her relationship with her parents being strained, and that her spoiling contributed to Minnie's bad behavior are the real reasons why they've been banned from previous Christmas Grottos. Ironically, Becky realizes the woman she had been talking to at the mall was Nanny Sue with children of her own and how it was similar to what Elinor and even her own parents had told her: that all Minnie really needs is discipline. After she agrees to go to "Shopaholics Boot Camp" and seek help, Becky and Luke can move forward with the idea of expanding their family...if only they can survive the "surprise" party, which over two million people in London have found out about (and which Becky did try to keep a secret).

Now reformed, Becky visits Surrey to apologize to Graham and Jane for her earlier behavior. She realized they were originally right in their assessment, but was in denial because of wanting to give Luke a surprise birthday party. In finally accepting responsibility for herself, Becky reconciles with her parents. Having had enough of Janice's behavior, Becky defends Jess and Tom's decision to adopt their first child by telling her off to leave them alone. She is fed up with Janice's actions in trying to force them to have a natural child first and that she should support their decision. The latter is offended by Becky for calling her out by demanding that she support her decision to want a natural child first. However, she refuses to back down and stands firm with Janice. Becky then bargains with her to ease up if she allows Jess and Tom to adopt first before having a natural child. Janice agrees to her terms. At the end of the book, Becky has become aware that Luke is doing business for Sage Seymour (a Julia Roberts-type movie star) and that he wants to take the whole family to Hollywood for three months.

=== Shopaholic to the Stars ===
Becky is still in LA, hoping to get a job as a personal dresser for Sage Seymour. However, Luke is adamant about not introducing the two because they're only there for a few months before returning to England. He wants her to instead focus on getting Minnie into preschool (which she presumably succeeds) and continue going to her support group at a wellness center for her shopping addiction. Becky eventually gets a job as personal dresser to Sage's rival, Lois Kellerton, upon reading of her credentials as a personal shopper from Barneys New York. Although it seems like a dream come true, she soon discovers the job is not what she thought of originally, especially when Lois starts making crude comments about both Luke and Sage in her own attempt to ruin them. She encourages Becky to get plastic surgery to change her appearance. She starts to act selfishly like Lois and tries to keep the job to herself, neglecting her family in the process. Luke eventually finds out and tells Becky what he thinks. This leads to a fight between them, and she once again accuses him of trying to ruin her chances to be a personal dresser to Sage. Luke angrily reminds Becky that she never told him that she was hired as a personal dresser to Lois. She must decide where her loyalties stand with her client, Lois, or her family.

Still pondering this, Becky gets some unusual help from her nemesis, Alicia, who feels guilty for her actions against Luke and Becky. She admits that she is trying to reform after seeing her daughter, Ora, befriend Minnie at preschool. Alicia reveals that she secretly helped them get Minnie into one of Hollywood's prestigious preschools. She suggests that Becky reconsiders getting plastic surgery while she still can, especially when she shows the scars from her previous plastic surgeries that went wrong. Becky keeps her encounter with Alicia a secret from Suze, who is still on edge with Alicia, and Luke, who is still angry with Alicia for her earlier behavior in trying to ruin his company.

Becky also discovers Tarquin has joined a wellness center like her. However, Suze is convinced the group he's joined is a fraud in brainwashing him into joining a cult and not the caring group of people that she's attending. Investigating this and finally convinced that her family and friends come first, Becky confirms that Suze's suspicion was right the whole time. She warns Tarquin to leave the center and his new friends, knowing they have care of their own interests over his. Tarquin doesn't believe Becky, but later regrets it. Whether he takes her warning seriously or not is left unclear.

Becky decides not to go through with plastic surgery and gives Lois an ultimatum: accept her as herself, or she'll quit. The story ends with a cliffhanger, but Becky promises to return soon.

=== Shopaholic to the Rescue ===
Becky returns with one thing on her mind: get her father, Graham, back to her mother. With Luke, Tarquin, and Suze in tow, she must look for clues on how he disappeared in the first place. Alicia comes to assist them, but Luke and Suze are still convinced that she's up to no good, given their history. Becky must deal with countless phone calls from her hysterical mother and Janice in England as she goes cross-country to rescue her father.

=== Christmas Shopaholic ===
Becky has moved to Oxshott and plans to host a family Christmas. Meanwhile her parents have moved to trendy Shoreditch, upsetting neighbor Janice, her sister, Jess, wants a vegan turkey and Becky's old flame has moved into town...but does he think she's still cool? Becky is also searching for the perfect Christmas gift for Luke, and joins the Men's Billiards Club to try and win him a suitcase in a raffle.

== Film adaptation ==
Becky Bloomwood is portrayed by Isla Fisher in the 2009 film Confessions of a Shopaholic. In the film, Becky is an American who resides in New York City and works in the magazine industry. She wants to work for Allete Naylor, the CEO of one of the leading magazines in the fashion industry. Unfortunately, the last position was filled by Alicia Billington and Becky must apply at Successful Savings.
