= Remember Me? (novel) =

2008 novel by Sophie Kinsella

- Author: Sophie Kinsella
- Language: English
- Genre: Comedy, chick lit
- Publisher: Bantam Books
- Publication date: 2008
- Publication place: United Kingdom
- Pages: 443pp
- ISBN: 978-0552772761
- Preceded by: The Undomestic Goddess
- Followed by: Twenties Girl

Remember Me? is a 2008 novel by the author Madeleine Townley under the pseudonym Sophie Kinsella.

== Plot ==
It is about Lexi Smart, a woman who has insecurities about herself until she experiences amnesia after a car accident. When she wakes up in the hospital she finds that she is a completely different person: she thinks it's 2004 and she's a twenty-five-year-old with crooked teeth, a disastrous love life and a dead-end job. The most recent events of her life she can remember are three years in the past. She learns it's actually 2007 – she's twenty-eight, she's the director of her department. She's fit, groomed, has a fabulous apartment, a closet full of designer clothes, and a handsome husband she has never seen before in her life, who also happens to be a multimillionaire. She finds herself without the loyal group of girlfriends she counted on to stand by her during this difficult time due to her changed attitude. As the story unfolds, she realises that she doesn't particularly like the person she's supposed to be, all the same trying to find her footing. As she learns more about her new self, she realizes her life is not all that she thought it would be. This is complicated further when she finds out that her perfect marriage may be an illusion as well, when a man turns up in her life, claiming to be someone she's been having an affair with. How on earth did all this happen? Will she ever remember? And what will happen when she does?

During the book Lexi is confused as to who "Jon" is because he claims to be Lexi's secret lover and before the accident he says that Lexi was going to leave her husband and stay with Jon. Lexi realizes that she has changed from who she remembers to be because her old friends suddenly hate her as she has turned into the boss from hell.
