= Shopaholic (novels) =

Series of books by Sophie Kinsella

Shopaholic is a series of novels written by the UK author Sophie Kinsella, who also wrote under her real name Madeleine Wickham. The books follow protagonist Rebecca Bloomwood, an idealistic, but intelligent and hard-working financial journalist through her adventures in shopping and life. Each book typically centers around a large shift in Becky's personal or work life and details the trouble that ensues as a result of her quirky personality and unrealistic goals. The series has ten books. The novel series has been optioned by a Hollywood studio, with the Shopaholic film being released 13 February 2009 based of the first novel confessions of a shopaholic.

== The books ==
- The Secret Dreamworld of a Shopaholic (2000) also published as Confessions of a Shopaholic (2001)
- Shopaholic Abroad (2001) also published as Shopaholic Takes Manhattan (2002)
- Shopaholic Ties the Knot (2002)
- Shopaholic & Sister (2004)
- Shopaholic & Baby (2007)
- Mini Shopaholic (2010)
- Shopaholic on Honeymoon (2014)
- Shopaholic to the Stars (2015)
- Shopaholic to the Rescue (2016)
- Christmas Shopaholic (2019)

== Film ==
Confessions of a Shopaholic was released on 13 February 2009 and was based on the first and second books. Directed by P. J. Hogan, the film stars Isla Fisher as Rebecca and Hugh Dancy as Luke.

Confessions of a Shopaholic has received generally negative reviews from critics. The film holds an average score of 38, based on 30 reviews on the web site Metacritic, which assigns a normalized rating out of 100 to reviews from mainstream critics. On Rotten Tomatoes the film holds a rating of 25%, based on 165 reviews with an average score of 4.37/10. The site's consensus reads: "This middling romantic comedy underutilizes a talented cast and delivers muddled messages on materialism and conspicuous consumption."

== Bibliography ==
- Sophie Kinsella, The Secret Dreamworld of a Shopaholic (Black Swan, September 2000). First edition. ISBN 0-552-99887-7
- Sophie Kinsella, Confessions of a Shopaholic (February 6, 2001) First US edition of Secret Dreamworld
- Sophie Kinsella, Shopaholic Abroad (Black Swan, September 3, 2001) First edition. ISBN 0-552-99940-7
- Sophie Kinsella, Shopaholic Takes Manhattan (January 29, 2002) First US edition of Shopaholic Abroad
- Sophie Kinsella, Shopaholic Ties the Knot (Black Swan, July 1, 2002) First edition. ISBN 0-552-99957-1
- Sophie Kinsella, Shopaholic & Sister (Bantam Press, June 1, 2004) First edition. ISBN 0-593-05241-2
- Sophie Kinsella, Shopaholic & Baby (Bantam Press, February 1, 2007) First edition. ISBN 0-593-05387-7
- Sophie Kinsella, Mini Shopaholic (The Dial Press, September 21, 2010) First edition. ISBN 0-385-34204-7
