= Gilles Montezin =

French fashion designer

- Education: l’Ecole de la Haute Couture

Gilles Montezin is a French clothing designer well known for his elegant haute couture style. His clothes have been worn by various high-profile celebrities and featured in films such as Sex and the City and Confessions of a Shopaholic.

== Early life ==
As a young teen, Montezin was first inspired to go into fashion after seeing a dress by designer Anne Marie Beretta in a French magazine. He went on to get his primary education at Paris' l’Ecole de la Haute Couture, and after completing his studies, went to work on elaborate period costuming for the Opéra Bastille.

While in Paris he also worked for both Loris Azzaro and master couturier Christian Lacroix, studying under the latter for eight years. In that time period he completed designs for celebrities such as Catherine Zeta-Jones, Madonna, and Monica Bellucci.

== Recent career ==
Montezin moved to New York in 2004 to start his own collection, where his pieces have been prominent in the entertainment industry. His clothing has been filmed in the TV productions of All My Children, Guiding Light, on Barbara Walters, and in the box-office hit films Sex and the City (2008) and Confessions of a Shopaholic (2009). His clothes have also been featured in magazines Women's Wear Daily, Elle Sweden, and OK!, and his celebrity clients have included Sarah Jessica Parker, Kim Cattrall, Mary Tyler Moore, Andrea Mitchell, and Debra Messing.

In 2009, Montezin announced the launch of his new bridal line under the name, Gilles Montezin Bridal. He is scheduled to debut the bridal collection in October 2009. Similar to Montezin's ready-to-wear line, the dresses feature intricate hand detailing and signature tailoring techniques. The dresses have already been favorably received in part because of a specially designed corset he calls "Le Cinch", which reduces the waistline by several inches and gives brides a clean, sleek silhouette.

Two of his designs were selected by Kleinfeld Bridal, the outlet featured on the TLC reality television show Say Yes to the Dress.

== Personal life ==
Montezin currently lives in New York city with his partner, a concert pianist.
