= Can You Keep a Secret? (novel) =

2003 book by Sophie Kinsella

- First edition
- Author: Sophie Kinsella (pseud. Madeline Wickham)
- Language: English
- Genre: Comedy, chick lit
- Publisher: Black Swan
- Publication date: March 1, 2003 (UK)
- Publication place: United Kingdom
- Pages: 368pp
- Followed by: The Undomestic Goddess

Can You Keep a Secret? is author Sophie Kinsella's first "stand-alone" novel, published by Black Swan on March 1, 2003 in the United Kingdom.

== Plot ==
Emma Corrigan is a young woman in London, England. She is in a stable, but dull, relationship with the "perfect" man, and is currently attempting to climb the corporate ladder at Panther Cola, a multi-national cola company headquartered in London. Satisfied with life, she is thrown off-kilter when she mistakenly blurts out all of her inner secrets to a complete stranger on a plane when it hits turbulence and she believes she is going to die.

Emma believes that she is in the clear when she leaves the plane, as she is confident that she will never see that stranger again. However, when he shows up at work, and turns out to be the company's founder, she is forced to come face-to-face with the man, her secrets, and the desire for her life to change.

== Difference between editions ==
The U.S. edition contains different passages from the U.K. edition such as the beginning of the book, where Emma helps a young boy pick out a toy while on the plane. This was not in the U.K edition. Later in the book, Emma goes to the bathroom while talking to her friend Lissy at the club about Lissy's boyfriend. When she comes back, Lissy informs her that she missed Ewan McGregor. In the U.K. edition, Emma just writes a memo in her hand over a conversation she has with Lissy about her boyfriend. Later still in the U.S. edition, Emma and her boyfriend Connor attempt to have sex at work, only to be caught with his hand down her top by their boss. In the U.K. edition, they avoid being caught in a directly compromising position.

== Film adaptation ==
A 2019 film adaptation based on the book was directed by Elise Duran and starred Alexandra Daddario and Tyler Hoechlin.
