= Mini Shopaholic =

Book by Sophie Kinsella

- First edition
- Author: Sophie Kinsella
- Language: English
- Series: 6
- Genre: Comedy, Chick lit
- Publisher: Black Swan
- Publication place: United Kingdom
- Pages: 443

Mini Shopaholic (2010) is the sixth book of the Shopaholic series. It is a chick-lit novel by Sophie Kinsella, a pen-name of Madeline Wickham. It focuses on the main character Rebecca (Becky) Bloomwood, her husband Luke Brandon and their daughter Minnie.

== Plot summary ==
Rebecca Bloomwood and her husband, Luke Brandon, want to buy a home of their own so that they do not have to live with Becky's parents anymore. Their young daughter, Minnie, exhibits behavioral problems and seems to be incapable of being controlled by either parent, giving Luke doubts about having a second child.

Becky plans a surprise party for Luke, but encounters several financial constraints, including hardships from a potential lawsuit between Luke's company and the Arcodas group (which Luke claims will just be a settlement), Becky's excessive shopping, and their pursuit of a proper home. Luke's biological mother, Elinor, wants to get to know Minnie; as Luke and Elinor struggle to get along, Becky keeps her encounters with Elinor a secret, while missing Annabel, Luke's stepmother who was more of a real mother to him than Elinor. Becky also faces estrangement from her own parents after Graham and Jane assert that Becky is refusing to accept responsibility for her role in Minnie's behavior, and that she is interfering with their lives by inviting herself when they want privacy.

Meanwhile, Jess and Tom have secretly gotten married in Chile and are considering adopting a child, but Janice insists they have a biological child first. She laces their drinks with euphoria to get them to conceive a grandchild for her, but this attempt fails and culminates in Jess and Tom berating her for meddling in their relationship.

Becky is almost ready to abandon the surprise party until Elinor offers to help. Elinor apologizes for insulting Annabel and admits that Annabel was a better parent to Luke than she was. She also agrees to help Becky ascertain the source of Minnie's behavioral problems.

Without consulting Becky, Luke hires child-rearing expert and TV personality Nanny Sue for parenting advice. Becky is infuriated with him for not gaining her permission first, then admits she has been talking to Elinor. Before an argument can unfold, Nanny Sue reveals that she was actually called in by Graham and Jane and had gone undercover with to observe their behavior, ultimating determining that Becky is enabling Minnie's disobedience after witnessing Becky relenting and buying Minnie a toy she wanted in response to a tantrum at a toy store. Becky initially tries to defend herself, but finally admits that her shopping addiction and inability to take responsibility for herself are what has made Minnie so unruly. Nanny Sue suggests they discipline Minnie more frequently and that Becky join a support group for shopaholics. Later, Luke begins to reconsider having a second child.

Becky reconciles with her parents. When she learns about Janice pressuring Jess and Tom to have a natural child, Becky defends their decision to adopt and implores Janice to be more open-minded. The book ends with Luke inviting Becky to Los Angeles with him for 3 months upon learning he's representing Sage Seymour.

== Characters ==
- Becky Brandon
- Luke Brandon
- Suze Cleath-Stuart
- Tarquin Cleath-Stuart
- Graham and Jane Bloomwood: Becky's parents who suffers a falling out with her. It's later revealed that they called Nanny Sue in secret before Luke did to confront Becky as a favor due to their stress in her refusal to accept responsibility for herself in playing a role in Minnie's bad behavior. When Becky finally does, she apologizes to her parents for her behavior and reconciles with them.
- Minnie Brandon: Luke and Becky's toddler daughter who is naughty. It's revealed by Nanny Sue she is acting that way due to Becky's selfish behavior and inability to accept responsibility when it's due.
- Martin and Janice Webster
- Jessica Webster(née Bertram): Becky's older half-sister who marries Tom in Chile. She and Tom plan to adopt their first child, but Janice is insistent they have a biological child first before adopting.
- Tom Webster
- Elinor Sherman: Luke's estranged mother whom didn't like Becky. After one more insult involving her and Annabel(Luke's deceased stepmother), he finally cut ties with his mother. She meets Becky in secret and asks to see Minnie. At first, she refuses to allow it because of an earlier insult Elinor made about her. Soon Becky starts to see how their behavior is resembling hers' and how it will affect Minnie later on. She tries to convince Luke to reconcile with Elinor, but he refuses because he was angry over an insult she made about Becky and Annabel. When she finally gives up on the surprise birthday party, Elinor steps in and offers her help. She reconciles with Becky who asks her for help in dealing with Minnie's bad behavior and of which she accepts.
- Nanny Sue: The host of her hit TV series "Nanny Sue" whom Luke calls to deal with Minnie's bad behavior. However, she shocks both Luke and Becky with her surprise assessment and that Graham and Jane(Becky's parents) called her in before Luke did. She had gone undercover using her own children to observe theirs and Minnie's behavior. From her limited observations, Nanny Sue knew Becky was the guilty party and confronts her as a favor to her parents. After getting her to admit to her wrongdoing, Nanny Sue suggests they start Minnie on a strict regime of discipline(similar to what Elinor said) and that Becky must go to a support group along with Shopaholics' Boot Camp.

== Shopaholic Series ==
- The Secret Dreamworld of a Shopaholic (2000) also published as Confessions of a Shopaholic (2001)
- Shopaholic Abroad (2001) also published as Shopaholic Takes Manhattan (2002)
- Shopaholic Ties The Knot (2002)
- Shopaholic & Sister (2004)
- Shopaholic & Baby (2007)
- Mini Shopaholic (2010)
- Shopaholic to the Stars (2014)
