= Shopaholic Abroad =

Novel by Sophie Kinsella

- Author: Sophie Kinsella
- Publication date: 2001
- Pages: 387 pp.
- ISBN: 9780440241812
- Preceded by: The Secret Dreamworld of a Shopaholic
- Followed by: Shopaholic Ties The Knot

Shopaholic Abroad (also known as Shopaholic Takes Manhattan) (2001) is the second in the Shopaholic series. It is an adventure novel by Sophie Kinsella, a pseudonym of Madeleine Wickham. It follows the story of Becky Bloomwood and her adventures when she's offered the chance to work in New York City. Along with the first novel in the series, it provided the basis for the film Confessions of a Shopaholic.

== Plot synopsis ==
Life looks good for Becky Bloomwood. She has a great relationship with boyfriend Luke as well as a steady job giving financial advice on television. Furthermore, she is on good terms with her bank manager, Derek Smeath. Life becomes problematic for Becky when Mr. Smeath retires from Endwich Bank and Luke announces he wants to make it big in New York, big changes are in store for Becky. She takes to New York like an angel to heaven. Becky has never been happier and the reader is treated to Becky seeing the Guggenheim in a unique way, winning the attention of employees at Barney's and discovering sample sales. Becky spends a substantial amount of money, but is sure she's financially secure, with the job offers on T.V. piling up. She also justifies her expenses by convincing herself that the items are an investment in the future.

An article in the Daily World reveals her high debts, calls her a fraud for telling people how to manage their money when she is herself feckless. This causes a fight between her and Luke, as there are current rumours about that his PR company, Brandon Communications, will lose Bank of London as their client, and her being revealed as in debt (and Luke not even knowing about it) doesn't help situations. More and more opportunities are ruled out, when more and more people read the article. She even loses her current job on Morning Coffee, and is replaced by her former co-worker Clare Edwards, who Becky never liked, being boring and smug. She returns home to her roommate and best friend Suze, while Luke remains in New York, and their relationship comes to an apparent end.

Becky and Suze go to Becky's new bank manager to ask for a bigger overdraft, but are met with nothing but hostility and disgust. A woman who worked for her former employers Morning Coffee contacts her and asks her to lunch, Becky becomes hopeful, but it turns out she only wants her to come on and be told off by Clare for TV. She becomes depressed and Suze tries to comfort her. On a trip to Luke's office to collect a package for her delivered there, Becky decides that she will see Mel, Luke's secretary, for a bit because she missed her. She collects her package, but also notices how quiet it is with no moral. She hides in Mel's desk just in time so no one catches her in the office. During that time, she overhears Alicia's conversation with her fiancé, Ben Bridges, and another Brandon C. worker, which confuses her. Becky discovers she, along with her colleagues and Bridges, are planning to steal Luke's clients, along with Bank of London, and run the company out of business to embarrass Luke. She waits for them to leave, which they do after a few tense minutes and she safely leaves Brandon C.

Instead of going home to Suze and tell her about what she had witnessed, Becky decides to do a little detective work and find out more about Alicia's plans. She heads down to King Street and ask a tenant about any new businesses coming into the street. He tells Becky the empty 2nd floor of the building he owns, will be the future home of a financial public relations business called "Bridges and Billington" and the Bank of London will be one of their future clients. Furious at Alicia's actions for what she did to Luke as well as herself, Becky thanks the tenant for his help and leave for home. After returning home, she immediately contacts Luke's colleague in America, Michael Ellis, and tells him the truth about what she had seen. He thanks her for informing him, but Becky requests that Michael does not tell him that it was her. When asked about her reasons against it, Becky admits that she's concerned that Luke will think she's spreading rumors by gossiping behind his back to prove a point after a remark she made about Elinor. Michael agrees to cover for her by telling Luke that he found out from an anonymous tip and will look into it.

The next day, Suze suggests for a healing and empowering exercise that Becky throw out all her unnecessary possessions. She was against it at first, but later agrees when she saw how cluttered her room is and needed something to take her mind off of losing her job and Alicia's plans. While trying to tidy up, Becky comes up with a better idea after watching an art sale auction on TV. When Suze and Tarquin comes in to her room, Becky tells them the great idea that she had in mind. She has decided to sell off all her unnecessary possessions in a sales auction to make a lot of money. To her surprise and relief, Suze and Tarquin are on board to helping her advertise the sale. During that time, Becky gets a call from Michael, who invites her to lunch at the Savoy Hotel.

At the Savoy Hotel, he congratulates her for helping them out because her information saved Brandon C. from being run out of business by exposing Alicia and her colleagues for trying to ruin the company's reputation with their clients. Michael reveals that Luke has returned to London to try and salvage his company's reputation with his clients while trying to keep interest open in America. He also mentions that because of Alicia's fiancé's wealth, Ben was a key player in her plans and he was able to finance the project that they've been working on for some time. They were planning to steal all of Brandon C.'s clients and set up business elsewhere in King Street. As soon as Luke left with Becky for New York, she and her colleagues got to work immediately by telling their co-workers and clients a bunch of rumours that he will close the UK branch. As a result, clients are threatening to sue him and workers were leaving earlier, all the while she was telling him a different story. Once Michael told Luke the truth, he immediately returned to the UK branch of Brandon C. to search their desks and found plenty of evidence. Furious, he took Alicia and her colleagues by surprise in the meeting room and he fired them for it. Michael mentions that Luke plans to press charges of embezzlement against Alicia, Ben and four others involved in their scheme. Noticing that Becky has no job and is in debt, he offers her a job in Washington D.C. and can help her with immigration as he's got a good lawyer and friends in immigration to convince them. Michael also offers her good advice in finding work that she's real passionate about and not fall into a job she doesn't like.

That night, Becky holds an auction for her clothes and items. She sells all of it, even her Denny and George scarf, a big symbol for her and Luke's relationship, which makes more than three times her money back to pay off her debts. Becky accepts the slot on Morning Coffee, but shocks them all by telling them she has no more financial problems, has paid off all her debt, and is heading off to New York now to work at Barneys as a personal shopper (all of which is now true). Her former co-workers beg her to stay and answer questions from people on the phone wanting to know how she got out of debt. Becky refuses and heads to the airport with her travelling luggage ready to head to New York. Though unable to get an upgrade, the clerk was able to get her a window seat near the emergency exit with plenty of leg room. Becky comes across an article from the Financial Times, detailing Luke's risky business plans to save his company. Though feeling bad for him, she also accepts the fact it's over between them and she must move on with her own life.

Luke turns up at the airport and tells Becky that Michael told him all about what she did for his company. He thanks her, although Luke admits he was angry about it because she should have told him. Becky defends herself by stating she was worried that Luke wouldn't believe her if she came to him about Alicia and would think she was gossiping behind his back. Thus, she thought telling Michael about Alicia's plans was a safer bet since he would not betray her. While having a drink at the airport bar, Luke revealed that he confronted the reporter from Daily World that wrote the bad article about Becky to reveal her source and was enraged when he found out Alicia was involved. After returning to London, Luke did extensive search in her desk and had found bank statements that belonged to Becky. This revelation makes her feel bad for leaving her bank statements behind, unaware of the trouble it and the excessive shopping caused her. However, Luke reveals that he was Alicia's real target and she was a mere stepping stone. He admits he realized his mistake in accusing Becky for ruining his deal and apologizes after learning Alicia ruined her T.V. career intentionally so she had an easier shot at embarrassing him by ruining Brandon C's reputation with their clients and running it out of business. She tells Luke that it was also her own fault, because if she had been keeping tabs on her money and not gone shopping excessively in New York, she wouldn't have put herself in the mess she was in. In a lot of ways, Becky was glad she read the article because she realized she had to grow up and start paying back her debts. Luke begs her to stay, to come and work at Brandon Communications. He also reveals how much Alicia decimated his staff, including firing his trustworthy secretary, Mel, when she suspected Alicia and a few others for lying to him. Becky refuses and tells Luke that she doesn't want to settle down at a job she doesn't want, as she's too young for that. When he asks her reasons against it and starts to believe she has taken up Michael's offer to live in Washington DC, Becky reveals her intent to return to New York to work at Barneys as a personal shopper. She also admits that she didn't take Michael's offer and that he was being a good friend in giving her good advice in finding a job she is passionate in working at. Realizing this, Luke apologizes to Becky again for his assumption. Before she leaves, Luke gives Becky back her Denny and George scarf, revealing that the two bidders pitting against each other were him. Becky leaves for New York to accept a job at Barneys.

Some time later, Becky is working as a personal shopper at Barneys in New York. She has regular TV appearances representing fashion styles, which gains her more than three times her viewers back. Becky is helping out a female customer to accessorise an outfit, when Luke shows up as a customer. Becky soon realizes she really missed him and they get back together.

== Characters ==
- Becky Bloomwood
- Suze Cleath-Stuart
- Luke Brandon
- Tarquin Cleath-Stuart
- Tom Webster
- Graham and Jane Bloomwood
- Martin and Janice Webster
- Lucy
- Derek Smeath
- Clare Edwards
- Alicia Billington

=== Characters introduced in the novel ===
Ben Bridges: Alicia's fiancé and key player in her plans. He was the one who funded the project because of his wealth and it was carefully well thought of. He and Alicia had gotten a new business in King Street which got derailed when Luke found out the truth and returned to England.

Michael Ellis: Luke's colleague in America. He and Becky becomes good friends. It was she who told him about what Alicia had done that lead him to telling Luke the truth, but keeping Becky a secret to himself. Michael offers her a job in Washington D.C. when he learns that she is in debt and has no job. He also encourages her to find work she's passionate about and not fall into anything she's doesn't like.

Christina Rowan: The head of the personal shoppers at Barney's in New York. Becky comes as a customer there, but ends up working for her after losing her job on the Morning Coffee.

Elinor Sherman: Luke's biological mother, whom Becky immediately dislikes as she's cold, disinterested and uncaring of her son's attempt to try and reach out to her. This plays a crucial role in Shopaholic Ties The Knot when she calls out Elinor for being cold and selfish towards her son. In turn, she greatly despises Becky as she's immature and a flake for Luke's taste. She and Elinor would eventually reconcile in Mini Shopaholic, when she accepts responsibility for her actions and helps plan for Luke's surprise birthday party.

John Gavin: The new manager of Endwich Bank which Derek Smeath used to work. After reading the article from the Daily World, he greatly shows hostility towards Becky when she and Suze arrive and ask for a bigger overdraft. He sneeringly tells Becky that she needs to stop living in a fantasy world and grow up.

Mel: Luke's secretary introduced in the first novel. She and Becky presumably became friends in the 2nd novel. It's unknown what happened to Mel, but it's presumed Alicia had her fired when she found out that Mel suspected her of lying with intent to tell Luke the truth.

== Reception ==
Critical reception for Shopaholic Abroad has been mixed. Kirkus Reviews criticised the work as "lackluster", as they felt that it just a rehash of the much funnier Confessions of a Shopaholic. The Akron Beacon Journal was more positive in their review and called it "bathtub reading at its best", but stated that "although Kinsella wants to avoid anything really dark in the book, you have to wonder why the question of professional help for Becky is never raised."

== Film adaptation ==
A film adaptation of the novels starring Isla Fisher as Becky Bloomwood, Hugh Dancy as Luke Brandon, and Krysten Ritter as Suze was released on 13 February 2009. The film focused on some plots, while eliminating others to make room for the 2nd novel's plot Shopaholic Abroad.

=== Differences between Film and Novel ===
- In the novel, Luke and Becky travel to New York, while in the film they go to Miami.
- In the novel, Alicia exposes Becky via the British Tabloid magazine "The Daily World" for her credit card debts and as a result she loses her job at The Morning Coffee, along with prospects in America. In the film, Alicia helps Derek expose Becky and publicly humiliate her. She did it out of fear that her boss, Alette Naylor, will fire her and replace her with Becky.
- In the novel, Becky returns to England in shame after a fight with Luke concerning his mother, Elinor. In the film, Becky returns to her family home in an unknown small town in the Midwest in shame.
- In the film, Luke immediately suspected Alicia's involvement thanks to his private investigator keeping tabs on the latter and informs Alette right away, whereas in the novel, he had to find out the truth from Michael about Becky's suspicion on Alicia ruining Brandon Communications in London.
- In the novel, Becky is told by Suze to clean up her room and get rid of her unnecessary items. Becky soon comes up with a better idea after watching a show on TV involving an art sale, sell off her possessions instead. In the film, Clare and the others in the Shopaholics support group suggest Becky sell off her possessions in a sale auction.
- In the novel, Alicia and four others are secretly caught by Becky for their plans to ruin Brandon Communications and she informs Michael (Luke's colleague in America) about it, who then informs Luke about it. They are fired by Luke with impending embezzlement charges. In the film, she is caught by Alette whom was informed by Luke and found bank statements belonging to Becky. She demanded an explanation for what happened. Furious with Alicia for her selfishness and the embarrassment of the "Alette" fashion magazine, Naylor fires her right away and replaces her with Becky (who later turns down the offer).
- In the novel, Luke meets Becky at the airport and confronts her for not having told him Alicia's plans to ruin him. In the film, he confronts her on the street and reveals Alicia's role in humiliating Becky by helping Smeath ruin her.
- In the novel, Derek Smeath is replaced by John Gavin, who is much stricter. In the film, while omitted, Gavin's personality merges in Smeath.
- Unlike in the novel which Becky shows class in giving Gavin a check, she pays Smeath back by giving him the money in coins and forcing him to count them, much to his co-workers' pleasure (as they hated Smeath).
- In the film, Suze is upset with Becky for losing an expensive bridesmaid dress, while in the 3rd novel, Becky's bridesmaid's dress is made by her friend, Danny Kovich.
- In the novel, the "Financial Times" details Luke's risky business to save Brandon Communications. In the film, Luke quits Successful Savings to start his own PR firm.
- In the novel, Suze begs Becky to keep her Denny and George blue-gray scarf. In the film, it's Jane who does this. In both versions, Becky refuses.
- In the novel, Luke gives back Becky's scarf and informing her the two bidders were him, while in the film, Luke revealed the woman was his sister, Zoe, and paid by his agent to outbid him.
- Unlike in the 2nd novel, Becky reveals in a narration epilogue that she is a reformed shopaholic. She is still friends with Clare and Suze.
- In the novel's end, Becky works at Barneys New York as a personal shopper and had made more than three times her viewers back with her regular television appearance on tips about the fashion trends and how to accessorize them. In the film's end, Becky works as a fashion reporter for Brandon Report and of which makes her more successful.
- In the film's end, it's revealed Alicia had found another job, but because of her public humiliation of Becky and Alette, she was disgraced from the magazine world in general.
- Suze and Tarquin don't get married until the third novel. Luke is Tarquin's best man and Becky is Suze's maid of honor and bridesmaid. In the film, Suze has three other bridesmaids at her wedding.

== Shopaholic Series ==
- The Secret Dreamworld of a Shopaholic (2000) also published as Confessions of a Shopaholic (2001)
- Shopaholic Abroad (2001) also published as Shopaholic Takes Manhattan (2002)
- Shopaholic Ties The Knot (2002)
- Shopaholic & Sister (2004)
- Shopaholic & Baby (2007)
- Mini Shopaholic (2010)
- Shopaholic to the Stars (2014)
