= Confessions of a Shopaholic (film) =

- Theatrical release poster
- Directed by: P. J. Hogan
- Screenplay by: Tim Firth; Tracey Jackson; Kayla Alpert
- Based on: Confessions of a Shopaholic and Shopaholic Takes Manhattan by Sophie Kinsella
- Produced by: Jerry Bruckheimer
- Starring: Isla Fisher; Hugh Dancy; Joan Cusack; John Goodman; John Lithgow; Kristin Scott Thomas; Leslie Bibb
- Cinematography: Jo Willems
- Edited by: William Goldenberg
- Music by: James Newton Howard
- Production companies: Touchstone Pictures; Jerry Bruckheimer Films
- Distributed by: Walt Disney Studios Motion Pictures
- Release date: February 13, 2009
- Running time: 104 minutes
- Country: United States
- Language: English
- Budget: $44 million
- Box office: $108.3 million

Confessions of a Shopaholic is a 2009 American romantic comedy film based on the first two entries in the Shopaholic series of novels by Sophie Kinsella. Directed by P. J. Hogan, the film stars Isla Fisher as the shopaholic journalist and Hugh Dancy as her boss.

The film was released in theaters by Walt Disney Studios Motion Pictures on February 13, 2009. Despite being a box office success, it received negative reviews from critics, though Fisher's performance received praise.

== Plot ==
Shopping addict Rebecca Bloomwood lives in New York City with her best friend Suze and works as a journalist for a gardening magazine, but dreams of joining fashion magazine Alette. On the way to an interview with Alette, she tries to purchase a green scarf, but her credit card is declined. Rebecca offers to buy all the hot dogs from a hot dog stand with a check if the vendor gives her back change in cash, claiming that the scarf is a gift for her sick aunt. The vendor refuses, but another customer gives her the $20 she needs for the scarf.

Rebecca arrives and learns that the position has been filled internally, but that there is an open position with the financial magazine Successful Saving. Rebecca is interviewed by Successful Saving's editor, Luke Brandon, the man who had given her the $20. She hides the scarf outside, but Luke's assistant enters the office and returns it to her. Knowing she has been caught, Rebecca leaves.

That evening, she and Suze, while intoxicated, write letters to Alette and Successful Saving, but she drunkenly mails each respective letter to the wrong magazine. Luke, impressed by the letter intended for Alette, hires her. As Rebecca is hesitant to use her real name, Luke publishes her writing under the moniker "The Girl in the Green Scarf". Rebecca's column becomes a huge hit among business groups, and even Rebecca's own parents advise her to read her articles. Successful Saving eventually goes international, bringing much praise to Rebecca from both Suze and her workplace peers. After being asked to participate in a TV interview, Rebecca meets with the editor of Alette to purchase a dress for the occasion.

Rebecca later returns home to renewed confrontations with her debt collector, Derek Smeath. Suze makes her attend Shopaholics Anonymous. After purchasing dresses for her interview and Suze's wedding, the new Shopaholics Anonymous group leader forces her to donate all her new clothes. Unable to afford to keep both dresses, Rebecca buys back the interview dress, much to Suze's dismay. During the interview, Derek, in attendance, confronts Rebecca about her debt, leaving Luke extremely embarrassed and shocked. Successful Saving subsequently terminates Rebecca's column for bringing discredit on the magazine.

Rebecca's father is sympathetic to her plight and offers to sell his recreational vehicle to help her. She declines, as he earned the camper through years of hard work and saving, and resolves that she needs to take responsibility for her own actions. Rebecca is offered a position at Alette, but declines after learning she would be expected to lie to readers. Meanwhile, Luke starts a new company, Brandon Communications.

In order to generate enough revenue to repay her debts, fellow Shopaholic Anonymous members help Rebecca stage an auction for her used clothing. She finally earns enough to pay back all her debt when she sells her green scarf for $300, giving the money to Derek entirely in pennies and other coins to make it as inconvenient for him as possible in retaliation for humiliating her.

After reclaiming her bridesmaid dress, Rebecca arrives to Suze's wedding, where the two reconcile. After the wedding, Rebecca walks past a store window and is briefly tempted to make a purchase, but ultimately walks away. Rebecca then runs into Luke, who returns the green scarf to her, revealing that the woman who bought it was his agent. They reconcile and kiss, and Rebecca begins working with Luke at his new company as a columnist.

== Cast ==
- Isla Fisher as Rebecca Bloomwood
- Hugh Dancy as Luke Brandon
- Joan Cusack as Jane Bloomwood
- John Goodman as Graham Bloomwood
- John Lithgow as Edgar West
- Kristin Scott Thomas as Alette Naylor
- Leslie Bibb as Alicia Billington
- Fred Armisen as Ryan Koenig
- Julie Hagerty as Hayley
- Krysten Ritter as Suze Cleath-Stuart
- Robert Stanton as Derek Smeath
- Christine Ebersole as Morning Coffee Host
- Clea Lewis as Miss Ptaszinski
- Wendie Malick as Miss Korch
- Lynn Redgrave as a Drunken Lady at Party
- Nick Cornish as Tarquin Cleath-Stuart
- Stephen Guarino as Allon
- John Salley as D. Freak
- Lennon Parham as Joyce
- Katherine Sigismund as Clare Edwards
- Michael Panes as Russell
- Kaitlin Hopkins as Event Planner
- Kelli Barrett as Bidder in Black/Talking Mannequin
- Kristen Connolly as Bidder in Pink
- Ilana Levine as Manhattanite
- Susan Blommaert as Orla
- Matt Servitto as Head Waiter
- Brandi Burkhardt as Sample Size Worker
- Renée Victor as Bag Lady
- Scott Evans as Chad
- Asmeret Ghebremichael as Receptionist
- Ptolemy Slocum as Borders Assistant #1
- Jenny Powers as Borders Assistant #2
- Anjali Bhimani as Girl #1
- Jonathan Tisch as Fund Manager
- Marceline Hugot as Saleswoman
- Bea Miller as Shoe Store Girl #1
- Peyton List as Shoe Store Girl #2
- Ed Helms as Garret E. Barton

== Production ==
The film adapts the two books The Secret Dreamworld of a Shopaholic and Shopaholic Abroad which in the United States were known as Confessions of a Shopaholic and Shopaholic Takes Manhattan respectively. The film uses the novel's American title Confessions of a Shopaholic reinterpreting Rebecca as an American rather than English.

According to DVD commentary, John Lithgow turned down the role of Edgar West twice before accepting it. Fred Armisen was approached for the West role after Lithgow initially turned it down, but after Lithgow changed his mind, the Ryan Koenig role was written for Armisen. Ed Helms was cast as Derek Smeath but scheduling conflicts prevented him from taking the role. He shot the Garret role in one day.

Filming took place in New York, Connecticut, and Florida from January to May 2008. To change the ending to be more sympathetic to audiences during a time of recession, re-shoots took place in New York City on November 24 and 28, 2008.

Production on the film also included creating a group of faux upscale brand stores at the base of the Hearst Tower. Present were brands such as Valentino, Anna Sui, Catherine Malandrino and Alberta Ferretti. Several of the costumes were from the collection of French couture designer Gilles Montezin.

== Reception ==
=== Box office ===
On its opening weekend without Presidents' Day, the film opened #4 behind Taken, He's Just Not That Into You, and Friday the 13th, grossing $15,054,000 in 2,507 theaters with a $6,005 average. As of May 22, 2009, the film grossed $44,277,350 at the domestic box office, while its worldwide box office is $106,904,619.

=== Critical reception ===
Confessions of a Shopaholic received generally negative reviews from critics. On Rotten Tomatoes, the film holds an approval score of 26% based on 170 reviews, with an average score of 4.40/10. The site's consensus reads: "This middling romantic comedy underutilizes a talented cast and delivers muddled messages on materialism and conspicuous consumption." On Metacritic, which assigns a normalized rating out of 100 to reviews from mainstream critics, the film holds an average score of 38 based on 30 reviews, indicating "generally unfavorable reviews". Audiences polled by CinemaScore gave the film an average grade of "B" on an A+ to F scale.

According to critic Roger Ebert, "Confessions of a Shopaholic is no masterpiece. But it's funny, Isla Fisher is a joy, and — of supreme importance — it is more entertaining to a viewer with absolutely no eagerness to see it (like me) than Sex and the City was." Manohla Dargis of The New York Times wrote "If the producers are smart, they should make sure to tap both Ms. Fisher and Ms. Ritter for the inevitable sequel, which, while certainly improbable and probably inadvisable, might inspire one of those Depression-era follies in which all a girl needed was a catchy song and gold-digger dreams."

Todd McCarthy of Variety praised Fisher's performance, "as a young lady who can't say no to a beautiful dress or accessory, Isla Fisher is not to be denied, and her irrepressible comic personality overcomes a number of the film's impediments." Peter Travers of Rolling Stone wrote "Confessions is no more than a painless time-waster. But the beguiling Fisher is well worth the investment." Joe Morgenstern of The Wall Street Journal wrote "The production renders totally irrelevant all hopes for a well-made movie. It's one of those ragged, pandemonious studio comedies that hammers at plot points in every contrived scene. But Ms. Fisher has a few moments worthy of her abundant comedic gifts."

Peter Bradshaw of The Guardian rated two-stars saying, "this girly romcom could in no way be considered a prescient satire on our addiction to debt." In a negative review, Thomas Rogers of Salon.com summarized "Confessions of a Shopaholic may not look cheap, but, rest assured, it's definitely a fake."

=== Accolades ===
Awards	Date of ceremony	Category	Recipient(s)	Result	Ref.
Teen Choice Awards	2009 Teen Choice Awards	Choice Movie – Romance	Confessions of a Shopaholic	Nominated	
Teen Choice Awards	2009 Teen Choice Awards	Choice Movie Actress: Comedy	Isla Fisher	Nominated	

== Home media ==
Confessions of a Shopaholic was released by Touchstone Home Entertainment on DVD and Blu-ray on June 23, 2009, in North America and in Australia on August 5, 2009, and on Disney+ on September 17, 2021.

== Soundtrack ==
The soundtrack of Confessions of a Shopaholic was released on February 17, 2009, by Hollywood Records.
