= The Undomestic Goddess =

2005 novel by Sophie Kinsella

- First edition
- Author: Sophie Kinsella (pseud. Madeline Wickham)
- Language: English
- Genre: Comedy, Chick lit
- Publisher: Bantam Press
- Publication date: June 2005 (UK)
- Publication place: United Kingdom
- Pages: 400 pages
- ISBN: 0-385-33869-4
- Preceded by: Can You Keep a Secret?
- Followed by: Remember Me?

The Undomestic Goddess is Sophie Kinsella's second "stand-alone" novel, first published in the UK by Bantam Press in July 2005, and later in the US by Dial Press Trade Paperback in April 2006.

== Plot ==
Samantha Sweeting is a workaholic lawyer. After a mental breakdown, she walks out of her London office, gets on a train at Paddington station, and ends up in the middle of nowhere. Sweeting knocks on the doors of a well-kept manor where she is mistaken for an interviewee and finds herself being offered a job as a housekeeper. The employers are unaware of her true identity. Severely ill-equipped, Sweeting realises she has no relevant experience and is wholly unsuited to the role. She manages to cope, learns housekeeper skills and eventually finds love.
