= I've Got Your Number (novel) =

2012 novel by Sophie Kinsella

- First edition
- Author: Sophie Kinsella
- Language: English
- Genre: Romantic comedy
- Published: 2012
- Publisher: Bantam Press
- Publication place: United Kingdom

I've Got Your Number is a 2012 British romantic comedy novel written by Sophie Kinsella that was a New York Times Best Seller.

== Plot ==
Poppy Wyatt loses her engagement ring, which has been in her fiancé's family for three generations, on the day that his parents arrive from the US and in the following panic, she also ends up losing her phone. She finds an abandoned phone in a bin and decides to keep it so that the hotel where she lost her ring can phone her if they find it. However, the owner, businessman Sam Roxton wants it back and Poppy and Sam find that their lives become increasingly entangled.
