= Shopaholic Ties the Knot =

Novel by Sophie Kinsella

- First edition
- Publisher: Black Swan
- Publication date: 2002
- Pages: 406 pp.
- ISBN: 9780440241898
- Preceded by: Shopaholic Takes Manhattan
- Followed by: Shopaholic & Sister

Shopaholic Ties the Knot (2002) is the third in the popular Shopaholic series. It is a chick-lit novel by Sophie Kinsella, a pseudonym of Madeline Wickham. It follows the story of Becky Bloomwood and her boyfriend (later fiancé) Luke Brandon as they become engaged and plan their wedding.

== Plot synopsis ==
The book opens with Becky living with her boyfriend Luke in Manhattan's West Village. She has finally found her career calling as a personal shopper at Barney’s and is happily helping her best friend, Suze plan her wedding. Becky's best friend, Danny, helps her make a bridesmaid's dress. That night, Luke, Danny and Becky discuss when Becky will get married. She replies that she will get married in ten years, much to Luke's disbelief and amusement. A few days before the wedding, Becky learns that Suze is pregnant. Becky is shocked when she catches Suze’s bouquet and finds a marriage proposal from Luke in it.

Suddenly, she finds herself caught in the middle between her mother and Luke’s mother Elinor, both of whom want to throw her a lavish wedding, one at her childhood home in England and one at the Plaza Hotel in New York on the same day. On one hand, Becky wanted to get married at home. On the other, she wanted to have a gorgeous wedding at the Plaza, and being the 'special, glossy' person for the day. As she sees more and more preparations done on both sides, it's even more difficult for her to say no to either one. If Becky gives up the Plaza, she'll have to pay a penalty of a hundred thousand. Becky has no way of paying - and she can't possibly ask Luke or else he will get suspicious. During that time, she confronts Elinor for her own behavior in the way she treated him all his life. This in turn made her despise Becky for calling her out about that and reveals that she thinks Becky isn't good enough for Luke. Refusing to back down, Becky decides to bargain with Elinor about having her wedding at the Plaza in exchange that she writes down her confession in everything that she did including abandoning Luke and take responsibility for herself.

Meanwhile, Laurel, Becky's favorite customer at Barney's, is devastated about her ex-husband, Bill's, much younger girlfriend, Amy Forrester. Laurel tells Becky that she suspects Bill has been stealing some of her jewelry, including an antique emerald pendant her grandmother gave her and has been giving them to Amy in order to humiliate her. When Becky catches him in action stealing another one of Laurel's prized jewelry, she confronts both Bill and Amy for their actions. She tells them of her intentions to notify the authorities and press charges on Laurel's behalf unless they reimburse her by returning her jewelry at once. After Becky helps Laurel get all of her jewelry back, Laurel promises she will help Becky with anything she wants as a wedding gift.

In the end, Becky finds a great idea - first attend the Plaza wedding and feign marriage to satisfy Elinor. Then she and Luke takes a private jet provided by Laurel's company to England and really get married at Becky's home. At the end of the novel, Becky reveals to Luke that she had cashed in their New York wedding gifts and booked two first-class around-the-world tickets for their honeymoon. She also mentions that she has also helped Michael find a woman who loves him as he is and even helped Danny's fashion career.

== Characters ==
- Becky Bloomwood
- Luke Brandon
- Suze Cleath-Stuart
- Tarquin Cleath-Stuart
- Graham and Jane Bloomwood
- Elinor Sherman
- Michael Ellis
- Danny Kovitz
- Laurel: A customer at Barney's whom is concerned over Bill dating a much younger woman. She suspects that he has been stealing her prized family jewelry and been giving it to his girlfriend
- Bill: Laurel's ex-husband whom has been stealing her jewelry and had been giving it to his girlfriend, Amy, out of spite. When Becky catches him in the act, she calls Bill and Amy out for it. Becky tells both him and Amy that unless they want to face the authorities, they will reimburse Laurel by returning all her jewelry at once.
- Amy Forrester: Bill's younger girlfriend who has been wearing Laurel's prized jewelry that Bill has been stealing to give her.

== Shopaholic Series ==
- The Secret Dreamworld of a Shopaholic (2000) also published as Confessions of a Shopaholic (2001)
- Shopaholic Abroad (2001) also published as Shopaholic Takes Manhattan (2002)
- Shopaholic Ties The Knot (2002)
- Shopaholic & Sister (2004)
- Shopaholic & Baby (2007)
- Mini Shopaholic (2010)
- Shopaholic to the Stars (2014)
- Shopaholic to the Rescue (2015)
