= Shopaholic and Baby =

Book by Sophie Kinsella

- Author: Sophie Kinsella
- Language: English
- Genre: Comedy, chick lit
- Publisher: Bantam Books
- Publication date: 2007
- Publication place: United Kingdom
- Preceded by: Shopaholic and Sister
- Followed by: Mini Shopaholic

Shopaholic and Baby (2007) is the fifth novel in the Shopaholic series. It is a chick-lit novel by Sophie Kinsella, a pseudonym of Madeline Wickham. It follows the story of Becky Brandon (née Bloomwood) and her husband Luke as they navigate Becky's first pregnancy.

== Plot ==
Becky, heavily pregnant with her first child, prepares for the arrival of the newborn. During a sonogram appointment with Luke, Becky is briefly left unaccompanied in the room. Desperate to know the sex of the baby despite Luke's wishes to the contrary, Becky takes the ultrasound equipment to find out for herself. She initially thinks she can see male genitals on the baby but the sonographer returns, catching Becky and explaining that what Becky is actually examining is her own bladder.

Becky and Luke have recently sold up in order to buy a house, but are struggling to find a place that meets Becky's standards. Becky's relationship with Jess has drastically improved; Jess continues in her endeavor to make Becky more environmentally friendly, encouraging her to use secondhand baby items, the prospect of which horrifies Becky. Becky's friendship with Suze has also improved despite Suze's involvement with Lulu, a mother with whom Becky does not get along. Becky and Luke's marriage is also strained due to Luke's increasing anxiety over a new business partnership with the Arcodas group.

While shopping at a luxury baby boutique, Becky overhears a conversation about celebrity obstetrician Venetia Carter. Enamored with the idea of a luxurious birthing experience, she consults Luke, who insists she remain a patient of Dr. Braine, an older obstetrician who has seen many of the Brandon women through their pregnancies and whom Becky dislikes and finds dull. Luke eventually agrees and takes Becky to meet Venetia. Becky is dismayed when Venetia treats her with little interest and flirts with Luke, but consoles herself with the knowledge that Venetia is in a relationship.

At a later appointment, Becky discovers that Venetia's married boyfriend has returned to his wife. She grows increasingly suspicious of the relationship between Luke and Venetia, even going as far as to hire a private detective, Jim. During an appointment, Venetia spitefully confesses her intention to pursue Luke once the baby is born. Horrified, Becky arrives at the party Venetia and Luke are attending in hopes of exposing Venetia's plans to him, only to find them dancing together. Becky is so distraught that she collapses. When she awakens, Luke apologizes but denies any romantic involvement with Venetia, though admits that he and Venetia dated in college. The couple decides to return to Dr. Braine.

Becky later receives photos from Jim of Venetia and Lulu in the company of Iain Walker, the CEO of the Arcodas Group. Although he claims Luke hasn't changed, Becky isn't fooled and points him out from behind Iain. Jim angrily chastises his son, who defends himself by claiming he was secretly following Iain, Lulu, and Venetia because he suspected them of conspiring against Brandon Communications. Becky convinces Jim to apologize to his son and resolves to save Brandon Communications. When Becky shows Luke the photos of Iain and Venetia, he demands to know where she got them, but Becky refuses to elaborate, feeling guilty for suspecting Luke of having an affair.

During her baby shower, Becky shows Suze photo evidence of Lulu's affair with Iain, as well as her inability to control her unruly children. Now having seen Lulu for who she truly is, Suze resolves to end their friendship. Becky unwittingly comes across a love note from Venetia amongst gifts for the baby, and sneaks away from the party to go to the birthing center to confront Venetia, pretending to be in early labor. Family and friends arrive at the clinic anticipating the baby's birth, but when Venetia enters, Becky exposes the obstetrician's scheme to everyone present. In the ensuing argument, Luke reveals that Venetia has always been problematic, even feigning a pregnancy during their college years in order to convince Luke to stay with her when he was considering breaking up. Venetia insults Becky and asserts that she doesn't deserve Luke, but Luke defends Becky and professes that he loves her. Becky takes this opportunity to explain that she and Luke are effectively homeless, as the home they had planned to purchase has been bought from under them in the midst of all the trouble Venetia has caused. Suze offers the couple her family's unused summer home in Scotland, but Becky's parents insist that Luke and Becky stay with them in Surrey.

During the dispute, Becky goes into labor for real. Despite Becky's ability to remain calm in the midst of her water breaking, Jane furiously reprimands Venetia for her behavior and orders her out of the room. After Venetia leaves, Suze announces her intent to write an exposé about Venetia in the British tabloid magazine, "The Daily World", to ensure that other pregnant women avoid her. Dr. Braine arrives and helps Paula, an assistant working for Venetia, deliver Luke and Becky's child. Becky gives birth to a daughter, whom they name Minnie.

The book ends with Luke, Becky, and Minnie living modestly in the Bloomwood's family home.

== Shopaholic series ==
- The Secret Dreamworld of a Shopaholic (2000) also published as Confessions of a Shopaholic (2001)
- Shopaholic Abroad (2001) also published as Shopaholic Takes Manhattan (2002)
- Shopaholic Ties The Knot (2002)
- Shopaholic & Sister (2004)
- Shopaholic & Baby (2007)
- Mini Shopaholic (2010)
- Shopaholic to the Stars (2014)
- Christmas Shopaholic (2019)

== Character introduction ==
- Venetia Carter: Luke's ex-girlfriend from college who is a top celebrity obstetrician. Becky wanted to go to her, but Luke adamantly refused and eventually she saw why. It's later revealed that she's involved in an affair with Iain Walker as a means to help him ruin Brandon C's reputation in order to make Luke leave Becky. Venetia's reputation is ruined when Luke exposes her for feigning a pregnancy to keep him in a relationship he never wanted and didn't regret breaking up with her. Angered, she demanded that he leave Becky at once and take her back. Luke refused claiming Venetia caused them a lot of trouble with her manipulative and conniving ways. She also faces Jane's wrath and she is reprimanded for what she did to Becky. After ordering her out of the room, Suze announces her intentions to write an article to "The Daily World", warning pregnant women to avoid Venetia at all costs. It is implied that Venetia's career as a celebrity obstetrician is ruined because of the callous and disgusting way she treated Becky.
- Iain Walker: The owner of the Arcodas Group who is involved with Venetia to ruin Brandon C's reputation. He is also implied to be having an affair with both her and Suze's best friend, Lulu. When Becky's PI procured the pictures of him with Venetia and with the son's confession, she realizes she could use Iain's womanizing ways against him. In Mini Shopaholic and to avoid a potential lawsuit, Iain agrees to pay for the damages done to Brandon C's reputation with his lies as long as Becky doesn't reveal the pictures to the British tabloid "The Daily World".
- Jim the PI and his son: The private investigator father and son team whom Becky hires to spy on Luke. However, when Jim's son digs up evidence proving Iain and Venetia's plans to ruin Brandon C's reputation, Becky realizes what's truly going on.
- Dr. Braine: An elderly doctor who has seen Brandon women' pregnancies over the years. Becky originally doesn't like him as she finds him boring and dull. She later agreed to return to being his patient after learning about Venetia's past with Luke. Annabel is the one who presumably calls him in to assist Paula in helping Becky give birth to Minnie Brandon.
- Paula: Venetia's kind assistant who calls in Becky and Luke's family. She was the only one who was allowed to stay by both families to assist Dr. Braine in helping Becky give birth to Minnie.
- Minnie Brandon: Luke and Becky's daughter.
