= The Secret Dreamworld of a Shopaholic =

Book by Sophie Kinsella

- First edition
- Author: Sophie Kinsella
- Language: English
- Genre: Comedy, Chick lit
- Publisher: Black Swan
- Publication place: United Kingdom
- Followed by: Shopaholic Abroad

The Secret Dreamworld of a Shopaholic (2000) (released in the United States and India as Confessions of a Shopaholic) is a chick-lit novel by Sophie Kinsella, the first in the Shopaholic series. It focuses on Becky Bloomwood, a financial journalist who is in serious debt due to her shopping addiction.

== Plot summary ==
Becky Bloomwood lives in a flat in Fulham, London, owned by her best friend Suze's wealthy, aristocratic parents. She works as a financial journalist for Successful Savings magazine, although she admits to knowing little about personal finance. She is thousands of pounds in debt due to reckless spending on designer homeware, clothes and beauty products, which she rationalizes as 'investments' or 'absolute necessities'. The novel is punctuated by reminder letters from her various banks (and in particular the Endwich Bank, run by Derek Smeath). Despite this, she still receives letters offering her credit and department store cards.

On her way to a press conference at Brandon Communications, she notices that a scarf she has been wanting is on sale for 50% at Denny & George, but realizes she has left her credit card at the office. The shop assistant agrees to hold it until the end of the day. At the press conference, Becky is greeted by a staff member of Brandon Communications, who questions her about some breaking financial news, which Becky has to feign knowledge of. After the conversation, Luke Brandon, head of Brandon Communications, informs her that one financial group recently bought another, and it is rumored that Flagstaff Life is going the same way. But she has a much bigger concern: during the conference Becky realizes that she will not have time to return to the office for her credit card, but only needs 20 pounds more to buy the scarf. Luke overhears her asking a friend to lend her the money in vain, and interrupts the press conference to lend it to her, after she makes up a story about buying a gift for her hospitalized aunt.

Becky has never confessed her money problem to her parents. During a visit at their home in Surrey, they suggest that she should buy an apartment. Becky says she is not rich enough, and her parents tell her that is will need to choose between saving more money or increasing her income.

Becky's purchases a financial self-help book, and begins to track her expenditures.

Later that week, Becky's flatmate Suze invites her to dinner along with Suze's cousin, including Tarquin. In the same restaurant, Luke is having dinner with his parents. Luke's stepmother, Annabel, compliments Becky's scarf. Becky claims her aunt died in the hospital in order to avoid arousing Luke's suspicions that she purchased the scarf for herself. Luke asks Becky to come shopping with him at Harrods. She initially enjoys shopping with him for luggage, but is upset to learn that it is actually for his girlfriend, Sacha. She tells Luke off for humiliating her.

Suze and Becky find a magazine feature about eligible millionaires, including Tarquin and Luke. Tarquin asks Becky out on a date and compliments her on her scarf. Out of honesty, she declines a generous cheque for a charity (which she had come up with to keep the conversation going). But while Tarquin goes to the bathroom, Becky looks at his checkbook, and is disappointed to see that his spending habits are minimal. She is terribly embarrassed when Tarquin returns and catches Becky looking through his checkbook. Becky loses interest in Tarquin, despite his wealth and admitted he's just not her type.

Throughout the story, Derek Smeath, Becky's bank manager, is trying to contact her to discuss her overdraft. Becky offers various implausible excuses for not meeting him, until chance brings them together at a conference. Smeath makes an appointment with her and threatens her with trouble if she doesn't show up. Out of excuses, Becky goes to hide at her parents' house, telling them she has a stalker. Becky learns that her neighbors made a financial decision based on advice she gave them absentmindedly and they stand to lose thousands of pounds. Mortified, she attempts to make amends by writing an article exposing the bank's duplicity on the Daily World. The article is successful, and leads Becky to appear on a daytime television show, The Morning Coffee.

However, Becky did not realize the bank was a client of Luke's PR firm. He is angry with her, believing she wrote the article in retaliation for him disrespecting her. Becky mentions tried to call Luke several times to get his side of the story, but Alicia selfishly hung up on her believing her to be nothing more than a fanatic. They square off on television and Becky drives her point home about Flagstaff Life's duplicity. Luke concedes that she was right about them defrauding their customers and announces that Brandon Communications will no longer represent the bank. Becky becomes a regular on the Morning Coffee and a caller asks her how she can make her bad financial situation disappear because of poor decisions she's made. Hearing the story hit home to her, she advises the caller to take responsibility for finances because running away from the problems will make things worse. Afterwards, Becky takes her own advice, talks to Smeath, apologizes for her behavior, and agrees to meet him to discuss her debts.

Luke invites Becky for a "business dinner" at The Ritz. They end up sleeping with each other at the end of the night, and Becky misses another meeting with Smeath. However, Smeath writes to say that the meeting can be postponed, as her finances have improved thanks to her television work, though he will continue to monitor her account.

== Characters ==
- Becky Bloomwood: the main character and protagonist in the story. Although she works as a financial journalist, she also has significant debts concerning her credit cards and her constant overdrafts. Despite this, she continues buying new clothes, shoes and new items which others think are unnecessary. Becky is 5'7 with brown hair and green eyes.
- Susan "Suze" Cleath-Stuart: Becky's aristocratic best friend who keeps an eye on her spending spree. She is described as blonde, dark eyes and having freckles. Suze is an even worse shopaholic than Becky. In Shopaholic Abroad, it is revealed that Suze and Alicia have a bitter history during her time at Brandon Communications. It was also revealed, she was jealous of Suze because she had originally been in the running for promotion and one of Luke's hardworking senior employees. Alicia manipulated her way into the promotion by planting false evidence to get Suze fired. She had hated Alicia since then.
- Luke Brandon: The CEO and owner of Brandon Communications. Future Husband of Rebecca Bloomwood. He is described by Becky as being 6'4, dark hair and dark eyes. Luke dated Sacha de Bonneville before dumping her so he could date Becky.
- Alicia Billington: Luke's employee at Brandon Communications, described by Becky as being blonde, blue eyes and having long legs. This earns her the nickname Alicia Bitch Long-Legs, as she is selfish and uncaring. Alicia and Suze have a bitter history with each other when they first worked at Brandon Communications. She was responsible for an incident that got Suze wrongly fired just because she wanted the promotion for herself. Alicia and four others involved in her scam are later fired by Luke for ruining Brandon Communications' reputation.
- Graham and Jane Bloomwood: Becky's parents who are extremely cautious of their spending and tell her to cut back on her spending spree or make more money. In Shopaholic and Sister, Becky learns that Graham had a previous relationship with a woman named Marguerite and that she had a half-sister named Jessica "Jess" Bertram.
- Philip: Becky's boss at Successful Savings who did not promote Becky due to her lack of responsibility, but chose Clare Edwards instead.
- Clare Edwards: Becky's co-worker, who Philip was promoted based on how seriously she takes her job. She later replaces Becky as a financial expert in Shopaholic Abroad.
- Derek Smeath: Becky's bank manager at Endwich Bank. He is described as polite and professional, but also persistent whenever she refuses to meet him for a meeting. In the end, she and Smeath work out a meeting with each other.
- Tarquin Cleath-Stuart: Suze's cousin, who Becky tried to date, but realized he was not her type. He and Suze later get married in Shopaholic Ties the Knot and have three children.
- Martin and Janice Webster: Close friends and neighbors of the Bloomwoods.
- Tom Webster: Martin and Janice's son. He was originally dating Lucy until she dumped him in Shopaholic and Sister. Since Shopaholic and Baby, Tom has dated Becky's older half-sister, Jessica, and in Mini Shopaholic they got married in Chile. They have plans to adopt first, which even Becky fully supports, but Janice insists they have a natural child first.
- Lucy: Tom's girlfriend from the first novel and later fiancée in Shopaholic Ties The Knot. She dumps him at the beginning of Shopaholic and Sister and does not appear again.
- Elly Granger: Becky's other friend who only makes her appearance in this novel. She asks Elly for some money, but she has none. Becky describes her as having long red hair and blue eyes.
- Sacha de Bonneville: Luke's French girlfriend, for whom he buys an expensive luggage set from Harrods based on Becky's recommendations. She and Luke end their relationship at the end of the first novel, and she does not appear in the later novels. Sacha is described by Becky as having long black hair and hazel eyes

== Critical reception ==
The earlier novels in the series received a generally positive reception from critics.

One review considered it to be clever that Kinsella begins each chapter with an ominous letter to Becky from her bank.

Readers were said to like Becky, and care about what was happening to her as if for a friend. While she has faults, she is 'irresistibly daft.' Many reviewers agreed that Kinsella had managed to combine two essential ingredients that make a novel popular with readers: abundant flashes of reality and witty humour. Women identified with the character and her situation. Reviews encouraged readers to 'stick to' these earlier books in the series, considering them better than the later books which appeared to have been written excessively quickly, although they would still satisfy those already faithful to the series.

== Film adaptation ==
A film adaptation of the novels starring Isla Fisher as Becky Bloomwood, Hugh Dancy as Luke Brandon, and Krysten Ritter as Suze was released on 13 February 2009. The film focused on some of the book's plots, while eliminating others to make room for the plot of the second novel, Shopaholic Abroad.

=== Differences between film and novel ===
- The novel takes place in England, while the film is in the United States.
- In the novel, Becky is a brunette with green eyes, while in the film, she's a redhead and has brown eyes.
- In the novel, Becky describes Luke as 6'4 with dark hair and brown eyes, with a frown on his face. In the film, while retaining his dark hair, Luke's eyes are blue and is only 5'11.
- In the novel, the Denny and George scarf that Becky purchases is described as being blue-gray and intricately detailed with rare blue beads. In the film, it's green.
- The film omits the Webster family who are good friends of the Bloomwoods, as well as Martin and Janice's son, Tom, and his then fiancée, Lucy.
- Becky's boss at Successful Savings in the novel, Philip, is also omitted and replaced by Luke, who in the novel owns Brandon Communications.
- In the novel, Derek Smeath, is polite and professional, though at times persistent concerning Becky's debt issues, and the two manage to work out a meeting. In the film, Smeath becomes more antagonistic each time Becky avoids meeting him.
- The novel introduces Alicia Billington, a senior executive employee at Brandon Communications. She has a bitter history with Suze due to a previous incident (that Alicia caused) that got Suze fired. The film introduces her as a rival of Becky's who got the job at Alette.
- In the novel, Suze is described as being blonde and aristocratic, although she also has problems with being a shopaholic. In the film, Suze is brunette and artistic.
- In the novel, upon learning about the Websters' financial trouble due to her absentminded advice, Becky exposes Flagstaff Life's fraud via the British Tabloid magazine, "The Daily World". After squaring off with Becky on "The Morning Coffee", Luke conceded that she was right and refused to continue representing the bank who defrauds their customers. The film only has them talk about the mysterious girl with the green scarf.
- Unlike in the film, Becky's parents are more cautious in their spending, and tell Becky to shape up by cutting back on her spending or making more money.
- In the novel, Suze helps make artistic frames, that leads to her having a successful frame business. The film completely omits this.
- Unlike in the film, Becky never went to a support group for her shopping addiction until the end of the 6th novel, Mini Shopaholic.
- In the novel, Clare Edwards is described as being boring, pale and smug. In the film, Clare is more expressive and sympathetic toward Becky concerning her credit card debts, since she knows what it's like to be in debt herself. Clare also helps Becky attend a shopaholic support group, which Clare also attends just in case she relapses back to her old ways. Because of their similar problems with money management, the two become friends for it.
- In the novel, Suze and Tarquin are cousins who gradually date and eventually marry. In the film, they're unrelated and are actually lovers. It's likely that Tarquin took Suze's last name in marriage as a form of respect to her family, rather than have her take his own.

== Shopaholic Series ==
The Shopaholic series as of July 2020 consists of nine novels and one short story, in order:

- The Secret Dreamworld of a Shopaholic (2000) also published as Confessions of a Shopaholic (2001)
- Shopaholic Abroad (2001) also published as Shopaholic Takes Manhattan (2002)
- Shopaholic Ties the Knot (2002)
- Shopaholic and Sister (2004)
- Shopaholic and Baby (2007)
- Mini Shopaholic (2010)
- Shopaholic to the Stars (2014)
- Shopaholic on Honeymoon (A short story, released in December 2014)
- Shopaholic to the Rescue (2015)
- Christmas Shopaholic (2019)
