= Sophie Kinsella =

English author (1969–2025)

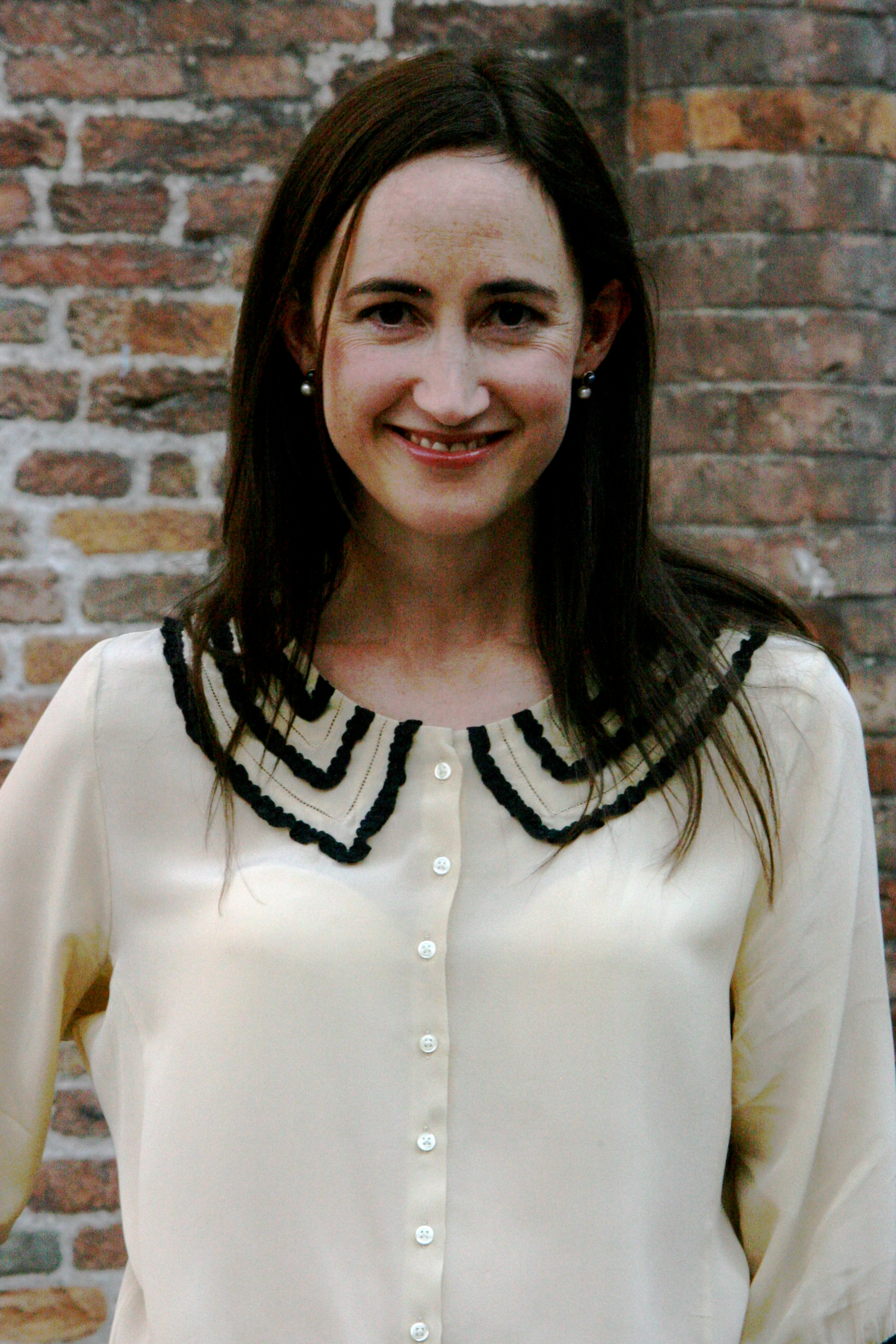
- Kinsella in 2009
- Born: Madeleine Sophie Townley; 12 December 1969; Roehampton, London, England
- Died: 10 December 2025 (aged 55); Dorset, England
- Occupation: Novelist
- Spouse: Henry Wickham (m. 1991)
- Children: 5
- Writing career
- Period: 1991–2025
- Genre: Romantic comedy
- Notable work: The Shopaholic series
- Website: sophiekinsella.co.uk

Madeleine Sophie Wickham (née Townley; 12 December 1969 – 10 December 2025), known by her pen name Sophie Kinsella, was an English author. She is especially known for her best-selling Shopaholic series of novels. The first two novels in the series, The Secret Dreamworld of a Shopaholic (2000) and Shopaholic Abroad (2001), were adapted into the film Confessions of a Shopaholic (2009).

== Early life and education ==
Madeleine Sophie Townley was born on 12 December 1969 in Roehampton, South West London to parents David Townley and Patricia (née Kinsella), a teacher and a lecturer respectively. She had maternal Irish heritage. She was the eldest of three daughters.

She was educated at Putney High School, St Mary's School, Shaftesbury, Sherborne School for Girls, and New College, Oxford, where she initially studied Music, but after a year switched to Philosophy, Politics and Economics (PPE), graduating with a BA.

She worked as a financial journalist (including for Pensions World) before turning to writing fiction.

== Career ==
At the age of 24, Kinsella wrote her first novel, The Tennis Party, which was published under her married name of Madeleine Wickham in 1995, when she was 26. The book became a top-ten bestseller and was republished in 2011 under the new title of 40 Love. She went on to write six more novels as Madeleine Wickham: A Desirable Residence (1996), Swimming Pool Sunday (1997), The Gatecrasher (1998), The Wedding Girl (1999), Cocktails for Three (2000), and Sleeping Arrangements (2001), all published before she adopted a pen-name.

Wickham's first novel under the name of Sophie Kinsella (taken from her own middle name and her mother's maiden name) was submitted to her publishers anonymously and was enthusiastically received. She revealed her real identity for the first time when her fourth pseudonymous novel Can You Keep a Secret? (her seventh novel overall) was published in December 2003.

Kinsella is best known for having written the Shopaholic series of chick lit novels, which concern the misadventures of Becky Bloomwood, a financial journalist who cannot manage her own finances. Becky is also known for her relationship with Luke. A theme of the series is her obsession with shopping and its resulting complications for her life. The first two Shopaholic books were adapted into the film Confessions of a Shopaholic, released in February 2009.

Shopaholic to the Rescue was released on 22 October 2015; "Christmas Shopaholic" was released in October 2019. Her most recent standalone novels are My Not So Perfect Life (2017), Surprise Me (2018), I Owe You One (Feb 2019), Love Your Life (2020), The Party Crasher (2021), The Burnout (2023), and What Does It Feel Like? (2024). In 2015, Kinsella branched out into Young Adult writing with her first such book, Finding Audrey, published in June 2015.

A musical adaptation by Chris Burgess of Kinsella's novel Sleeping Arrangements had its London premiere on 17 April 2013 at the Landor Theatre.

By the time of her death, Kinsella's books had sold over 50 million copies in more than 60 countries and had been translated into over 40 languages.

== Personal life and death ==
In 1991, Kinsella married Henry Wickham, whom she had met at Oxford. A schoolmaster, he became head of Lockers Park School and managed her business affairs. They lived in Dorset and London, with their four sons and one daughter.

In 2024, Kinsella revealed she had glioblastoma, an aggressive form of brain cancer, with which she was diagnosed in late 2022. She underwent neurosurgery. Her final novel "What Does It Feel Like?", published in 2024, is a semi-autobiographical account of her diagnosis and treatment.

Kinsella died at her home in Dorset on 10 December 2025.

== Accolades ==
In 2024, Kinsella's novel What Does It Feel Like? was selected as one of The New York Times' 100 Notable Books of the Year. The book was also listed among "five of the best romance books" of the year by The Guardian.

In 2025, Kinsella was shortlisted for "Author of the Year" in the British Book Awards.

== Published works ==
=== As Madeleine Wickham ===
- The Tennis Party (1995) (re-released as 40 Love in 2011)
- A Desirable Residence (1996)
- Swimming Pool Sunday (1997)
- The Gatecrasher (1998)
- The Wedding Girl (1999)
- Cocktails for Three (2000)
- Sleeping Arrangements (2001)

=== As Sophie Kinsella ===
The Shopaholic series

1. The Secret Dreamworld of a Shopaholic (also titled Confessions of a Shopaholic) (2000)
2. Shopaholic Abroad (also titled Shopaholic Takes Manhattan) (2001)
3. Shopaholic Ties The Knot (2001)
4. Shopaholic & Sister (2004)
5. Shopaholic & Baby (2007)
6. Mini Shopaholic (2010)
7. Shopaholic to the Stars (2014)
8. Shopaholic on Honeymoon (2014) — short story
9. Shopaholic to the Rescue (2015)
10. Christmas Shopaholic (2019)

==== Other novels ====
- Can You Keep a Secret? (2003)
- The Undomestic Goddess (2005)
- Remember Me? (2008)
- Twenties Girl (2009)
- I've Got Your Number (2011)
- Wedding Night (2013)
- My Not So Perfect Life (2017)
- Surprise Me (2018)
- I Owe You One (2019)
- Love Your Life (2020)
- The Party Crasher (2021)
- The Burnout (2023)
- What Does It Feel Like? (2024)

==== Other ====
- Girls Night In (2004) (an omnibus of novels, along with many authors including Meg Cabot and Jennifer Weiner)
- Finding Audrey (2015) (a young adult novel)
- Mummy Fairy and Me (2018) (an illustrated series for young readers)
