= List of Superman & Lois characters =

Superman & Lois is an American television series developed by Todd Helbing and Greg Berlanti, based on the DC Comics characters Superman and Lois Lane, created by Jerry Siegel and Joe Shuster. The series stars Tyler Hoechlin and Elizabeth Tulloch in the title roles, as well as Jordan Elsass, Michael Bishop, Alex Garfin, Erik Valdez, Inde Navarrette, Wolé Parks, Adam Rayner, Dylan Walsh, Emmanuelle Chriqui, Tayler Buck, Sofia Hasmik and Chad L. Coleman. The series was initially set in the Arrowverse, sharing continuity with the other television series of the franchise. However, after season 2, it was revealed that the series took place on an as-yet-unidentified alternate Earth in the Arrowverse Multiverse.

The following is a list of characters who have appeared in the television series. Many are named after (or based on) DC Comics characters.

== Overview ==
Legend
= Main cast (credited)
= Recurring cast (4+ in seasons 1–3, 3+ in season 4)
= Guest cast (1–3 in seasons 1–3, 1–2 in season 4)

Cast and characters in Superman & Lois
Character	Portrayed by	Seasons			
Character	Portrayed by	1	2	3	4
Main
Clark Kent / Superman	Tyler Hoechlin	Main	Main	Main	Main
Lois Lane	Elizabeth Tulloch	Main	Main	Main	Main
Jonathan Kent	Jordan Elsass	Main	Main		
Jonathan Kent	Michael Bishop			Main	Main
Jordan Kent	Alex Garfin	Main	Main	Main	Main
Kyle Cushing	Erik Valdez	Main	Main	Main	Main
Sarah Cortez (née Cushing)	Inde Navarrette	Main	Main	Main	Main
John Henry Irons / The Stranger / Steel	Wolé Parks	Main	Main	Main	Main
Morgan Edge / Tal-Rho / Eradicator	Adam Rayner	Main	Special guest		
Samuel "Sam" Lane	Dylan Walsh	Main	Main	Main	Main
Lana Lang	Emmanuelle Chriqui	Main	Main	Main	Main
Natalie Lane Irons / Starlight	Tayler Buck	Guest	Main	Main	Main
Chrissy Beppo	Sofia Hasmik	Recurring	Main	Main	Main
Bruno Mannheim	Chad L. Coleman			Main	Main
Lex Luthor	Michael Cudlitz			Guest	Main (Note: Cudlitz is listed among the main cast but receives "special appearance by" credit in the opening titles.)
Recurring
Sophie Cushing	Joselyn Picard	Recurring	Recurring	Recurring	Guest
Irma Sayres / Leslie Larr	Stacey Farber	Recurring			
Jor-El	Angus Macfadyen	Recurring			
Zeta-Rho	A.C. Peterson	Recurring			
Lieutenant General Mitch Anderson	Ian Bohen		Recurring		
Candice Pergande	Samantha Di Francesco		Recurring	Recurring	Recurring
Lara Lor-Van	Mariana Klaveno		Recurring	Guest	Recurring
Lucy Lane	Jenna Dewan		Recurring	Special guest	
Alexandra "Ally" Allston	Rya Kihlstedt		Recurring		
Matteo Mannheim	Spence Moore II			Recurring	
Peia Mannheim / Onomatopoeia	Daya Vaidya			Recurring	
Amanda McCoy	Yvonne Chapman				Recurring

== Main characters ==
=== Clark Kent / Superman ===
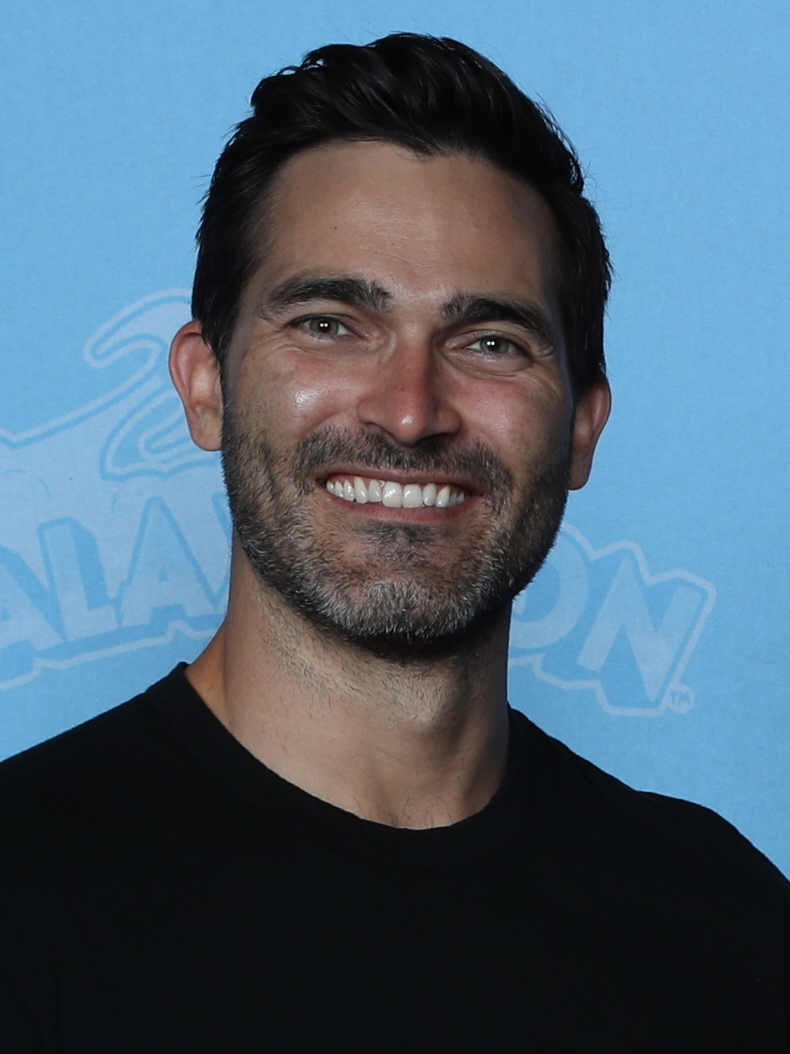
Tyler Hoechlin played Clark.

Kal-El / Clark Kent / Superman (portrayed by Tyler Hoechlin; Dylan Kingwell as a teenage Clark in season one, Josh Zaharia as a teenage Clark in season two, Thomas Hoeving as a child, Parker Cousineau during his grade school years, Lennix James as a 4-year-old Clark, Fred Henderson as an older Clark) is a superhero from Krypton who defends Earth and is Lois' husband.

In season one after losing his job at the Daily Planet and his mother dying of a stroke, Clark relocates the family to Smallville for a fresh start and becomes the assistant football coach in Smallville High School. Hoechlin previously portrayed Clark in a recurring role in Supergirl, where the character was introduced, before appearing in guest roles in Arrow, The Flash, Legends of Tomorrow, and Batwoman.

In season two, Clark starts to have strange visions and butts heads with Lt. General Mitch Anderson. A scan by Lara Lor-Van's A.I. at Tal-Rho's lair reveals that they are being caused by an "invasive cosmological event". This would lead to an encounter with Bizarro and a fight against Ally Allston. Following the defeat against Ally Allston and her Bizarro counterpart, Superman builds a new Fortress of Solitude in the ocean for his family.

In season three, Clark works to train Jordan in using his powers. In addition, he also goes to work for Chrissy. When Lex Luthor is released from prison and further mutates Bizarro into Doomsday by constantly killing him, Superman ends up fighting him in Smallville, Metropolis, and the Moon.

In season four, Superman continues his fight on the Moon. Doomsday removes Superman's heart, leaving his body for the Kents and giving Superman's heart to Lex Luthor. Superman survives after Sam Lane's heart is transplanted into his body. After numerous people figure out his secret identity, Clark publicly reveals that he is Superman in an interview with Janet Olsen. Following the defeat of Lex Luthor, Clark attended the wedding of Lana and John one year later. Years in the future, Clark dies with his sons present.

- Hoechlin also portrays an evil version of Superman from another Earth. His history in the canon Arrowverse comic mini-series Earth-Prime No. 2 revealed that his Jonathan and Martha died in a car accident and he was put in a terrible foster home. After unknowing using his powers on the foster father, Clark fled until he was caught by the government, who kept him in their custody until he escaped. Clark made his way to the Fortress of Solitude, where he met the A.I. of his world's Jor-El. After being delusioned that the entire world will still be in danger no matter how many times he averts danger, Superman met Tal-Rho who persuaded him to remake Earth into the new Krypton.

==== Bizarro / Doomsday ====
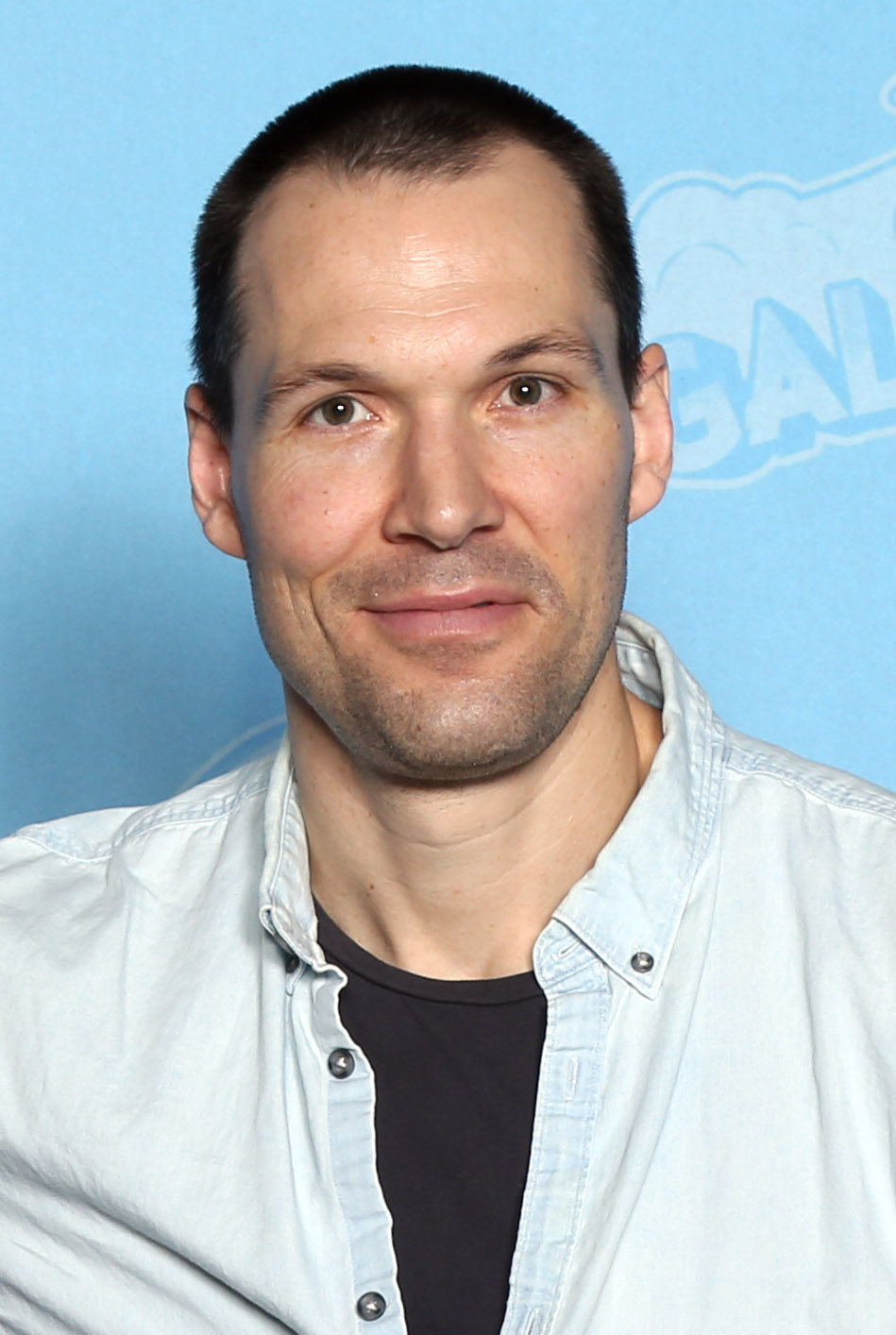
Daniel Cudmore played Bizarro.

Bizarro (portrayed by Tyler Hoechlin; recurring: season 2; guest: season 3; performed by Daniel Cudmore in full-armored form, motion-captured by Paul Lazenby in Doomsday form) is a deformed version of Superman from Bizarro World who sports a tattered cape, a backward version of the Superman logo, and opposite abilities to Superman. His fame and the development of his son Jon-El's powers go over his head putting a strain on his family. After Superman and Lois escape from Mitch Anderson's custody, Tal-Rho learns from Bizarro that his Bizarro counterpart was inseparable from him until Tal-Rho's wife nearly killed him. When Anderson attacks while wielding Project 7734 weapons and X-Kryptonite, Lara's A.I. releases Bizarro to help fight Anderson. Bizarro is overpowered by Anderson, who uses X-Kryptonite grenades on him and strangles Bizarro to death.

In season three, Bizarro's corpse is stolen and resurrected by Intergang. Luthor repeatedly kills Bizarro with X-Kryptonite to make him stronger, eventually turning him into a more monstrous form. In the fourth season, Doomsday rips out Superman's heart, leaving his body for the Kents and gives the heart to Lex Luthor. Lois draws Doomsday to her and successfully reasons with him by asking him to remember that he had a family and not to be Lex Luthor's pawn. After being taken down by John Henry Irons' hammer, Doomsday is carried to the Sun by Superman. With his humanity returning, Doomsday gestures Superman to kill him, which Superman does by pushing him into the Sun.

==== Superman A.I. ====
In the event that he was to fall in battle, Superman made an A.I. of himself (portrayed by Tyler Hoechlin) that is placed on the Fortress of Solitude. After Lex fools Jordan that he stepped on Superman's heart while secretly holding on to it, Lara's A.I. activates the Superman A.I. who reveals his creation. He states to his family that they will have to carry on without him.

=== Lois Lane ===
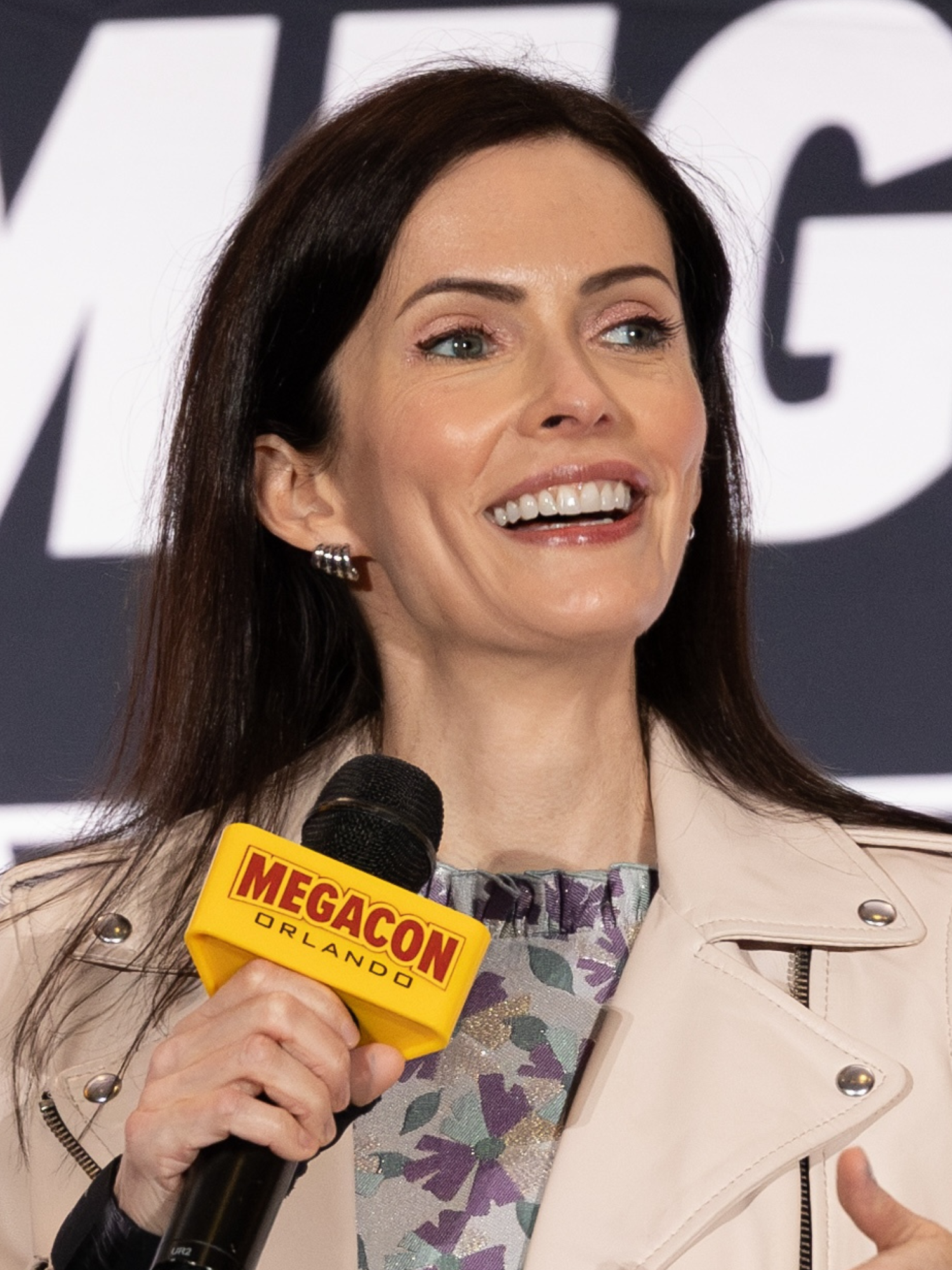
Elizabeth Tulloch played Lois.

Lois Lane (portrayed by Elizabeth Tulloch; is a renowned journalist and Clark's wife.

In season one, Lois quits her job after Morgan Edge buys the Daily Planet and start working at a local publication Smallville Gazette.

In season two, Lois and Chrissy start to work on expanding their staff. Due to some sources recanting the stories written by Lois, she and Chrissy work to prove them starting with one that Lois was told about by her sister Lucy and her encounter with cult leader Ally Alston. Thanks to Sam, Lois works to speak with Lucy only to end up confronted by Ally Alston who claimed that Lucy sent her in her place. Following Ally Allston's defeat, Lois reveals to Chrissy that Clark is Superman and has a brief chat with Ally and her Bizarro counterpart.

In season three, Lois visits Dr. Irons about what she knows about what this Earth's version of John Henry Irons did that involved Bruno Mannheim. Later on, Dr. Irons asks Lois to come in to do some more tests. Lois later reveals that she has been diagnosed with Stage 3 inflammatory breast cancer.

In season four, Lois gets surprised that Lex Luthor has moved into the abandoned hotel across from the Smallville Gazette. She is among the Kents that are saddened when Doomsday returns with Superman's body while delivering his heart to Lex. After Sam's heart is used to revive Superman, Lois becomes Chrissy's maid of honor and helps to persuade her to delay the wedding. Lois' cancer treatment was later completed. Following Lex's defeat, Lois became an officiated minister online as she oversees the wedding of Lana Lang and John Henry Irons one year later. Years in the future, Lois dies after her cancer returns; when Clark dies, he is reunited with Lois in the afterlife.

- Tulloch also portrays a variation of Lois Lane from another Earth where she is married to John Henry Irons. Before being killed by Superman, she gives away the Kryptonite weakness in her news report and tells her family that she loves them.
- Tulloch also portrays Lois' Bizarro counterpart whose relationship with Bizarro was strained. She works with Sam and Jordan in a resistance against her world's Ally Allston. Bizarro Lois later watches Allston's broadcast where she plans to merge both worlds.

=== Jonathan Kent ===
Jonathan Kent (portrayed by Jordan Elsass in seasons 1–2, Michael Bishop in season 3–4, Brady Droulis as a 7-year-old, an uncredited David Giuntoli as an adult) is the modest and kind-hearted son of Clark and Lois although unlike his twin brother Jordan, Jonathan does not seem to have inherited any of Clark's Kryptonian powers, though he is a top level athlete by human standards. He is named after Clark's adoptive father Jonathan Kent. Jonathan is on the Smallville high school football team called the Smallville Crows.

In season one, Jonathan initially claims that he is not bothered by the fact that he did not get superpowers like Jordan and even supports his brother on his journey to master his new abilities, he does admit later on that a part of him is actually jealous of his twin brother's new powers since thanks to them Jordan becomes very popular at their new high school and Smallville High's best new football player, but does not let his jealousy destroy his relationship with his brother and they both still love each other very much. Jonathan's insecurities comes to ahead later in season 1 after Jonathan and Jordan find out about how Morgan Edge and John Henry Irons are threatening both Smallville and their parent's lives. Jonathan feels powerless and defenseless compared to his father and brother's powers which leads him to take some of Irons' weapons until he returns them in the season 1 finale.

In season two, Jonathan starts dating Candice Pergande and finds out that she was the one who sold X-Kryptonite crystals to Timmy Ryan, and confronts her about it. Instead of telling on her, Jonathan asks for a crystal, which enhances his strength and vision. After getting caught by Principal Balcomb and the Smallville Sheriff Department trying to dispose of Candice's supply, he was unable to admit to Lois that they were Candice's. After a fight with a crazed Mitch Anderson, Clark returns and is informed of what happened. Clark persuades Principal Balcomb to allow Jonathan to undergo online education as Jonathan will also be working at Brit & Dunn's. After a fire at a warehouse containing X-Kryptonite, Sam persuades Jonathan to come clean as he advises them to keep the identity of the person private from the press. He calls Candice to the farm as she informs them on what she knows. Jonathan is eventually allowed to start attending school again and although he initially has struggles from being outcast by his peers following his circumstances after being expelled and meeting Jon-El, going on a small adventure with Jordan and Natalie helps Jonathan overcome this hurdle. Following Ally Allston's defeat, Jonathan and Jordan receive trucks that were delivered to them by "Uncle Tal".

In season three, Jonathan gets his driver's license and celebrates his 16th birthday. While at a party in Metropolis, Jonathan runs into Eliza who regretted breaking up with him. Jonathan lets her down easily when he mentions that he is now with Candice. Jonathan later learns of his mother's diagnosis. After learning about Lois's cancer, Jonathan and Jordan along with Natalie try to encourage her and offer their support by getting a gift watch for her which they leave within Jonathan's new truck while at school, but Jon's truck gets stolen while he is in class. Things between Jon and Candice temporarily become icy after Jon accuses her dad of stealing his truck. After locating his truck within a warehouse, Jordan and Natalie help Jonathan get his truck back and he later reconciles with Candice after she reveals that she found confirmation that it was indeed her father who stole Jonathan's truck when she returns the gift watch. Jonathan later confronts Candice's dad Emmitt over his illegal activities including his theft of Jonathan's truck which Emmitt falsely denies. When Jonathan further insists on Emmitt's bad qualities, he is given a black eye by Emmitt and is forced to tell his parents what happened after they inquire about what happened. After Clark and Lois confront Emmitt, he leaves town with the Kents allowing Candice to live with them. 3 weeks later, Candice moves in with her aunt in Topeka with Jonathan agreeing to a long-distance relationship despite working most of the week at Brit & Dunn's and being offered a place within the fire department by Kyle on the weekends.

In season four, Jonathan's Kryptonian powers finally activate. He masters his powers at a much faster rate than Jordan or Clark did and seems to gain all of his new Kryptonian abilities at once immediately, although he seems to be able to use them to a less accurate degree than Jordan is able to due to his inexperience. Following Lex's defeat, Jonathan attended the wedding of Lana and John one year later. Jonathan gained his own Superman-like suit and assists his father in his crimefighting. Jonathan grew up, got married, and was present with his brother at the funerals of their parents.

- Jordan Elsass also portrays Jon-El Jonathan's Bizarro counterpart, who has powers. With his relationship with his father is strained, Jon-El is swayed to the side of his world's Ally Allston. When both versions of Ally Allston start to merge, Jon-El is instructed to merge with his counterpart as Superman goes after him. He appears to inform Lois and Jordan that Superman lost. After attempt to merge with Jonathan failed, Jon-El kidnaps Lana, luring Superman into a Kryptonite-based trap and summons Lana-Rho. When he goes after Jonathan again, Jordan managed to defeat them in mid-air. Jon-El was remanded to DOD custody where Superman tries to get an imprisoned Jon-El to turn against Ally Allston to no avail. Lana-Rho later sprung him from his imprisonment where they attacked a weakened Superman at Smallville High School. They were defeated by Jordan and Natalie.

=== Jordan Kent ===
Jordan Kent (portrayed by Alex Garfin as a teenager, Dawson Littman as a 7-year-old, David Fuguree as an adult) is the introspective son of Clark and Lois. He has social anxiety and enjoys playing video games alone. He has inherited his father's powers, though initially his abilities are only in 'small bursts'; Jordan's powers were much weaker than of a full Kryptonian's and he originally had trouble using some of them on command like his heat vision, but did still develop other powers such as super hearing and freeze breath. He is named after Clark's biological father Jor-El. Jordan later joins Smallville high school football team although he later quits to focus on helping his family deal with Tal-Rho.

In season two, Jordan's powers have matured and started to grow at a tremendous rate with him able to now use his abilities much more easily. After Superman begins to have painful visions that debilitate him while in the field, Jordan plans to find a way to help his dad. Sam agrees to secretly train him for Jordan to become more adept at using his powers, during which at some point Jordan gains his super speed. Lois finds out that Jordan withheld information on Jonathan taking X-Kryptonite. After Jordan secretly helps save Kyle from a fire by super leaping through a wall that John Henry Irons witnesses, Lois confronted Jordan about it and learned that Sam trained him. She forbade Jordan to follow in his father's footsteps until Lois and Sam were caught outside an X-Kryptonite distribution house. Lois was forced to call for Jordan's help when she realized that without him they would have been killed and witnessed him effortlessly defeat their captors after he gained his ability of accelerated perception and save them thanks to his newfound handle on his powers. When it came to the fight against Ally Allston's followers, he struggled in his fight against Jon-El (who had been sent to merge with Jonathan), but manages to defeat him while in the air when Jordan flies for the first time. After Jon-El's defeat Jordan also gets taught by Clark on how to fly and even learns how to fly in space, but still does not know how to land yet. When Lana-Rho springs Jon-El from his imprisonment and they attacked Superman, Jordan and Natalie defeat them. During the fight against Ally Allston, Jordan went to rescue Tal-Rho from being slain by Ally. After Ally is defeated, Jonathan and Jordan receive trucks that were delivered to them by "Uncle Tal".

In season three, Jordan celebrates his 16th birthday while being trained by his father in using his abilities, although Jordan gets scolded by Clark when he attempts solo heroics. Even though Jordan has reconciled with Sarah, she decides to not get back together with him which leaves Jordan feeling awkward about how to be around her, although he decides to respect her choice. Unlike Jonathan, Jordan does not try to bother getting his drivers license due to returning his own truck since he could already fly and run at super speed. With Smallville High temporarily closed due to black mold remediation, Jonathan convinces Jordan to fly them to a party in Metropolis for Jordan to meet with another girl to try and get over Sarah. After meeting Sarah at the party, they both decide to continue with being just friends and have fun together at the party. The Smallville teens are forced to leave the party early when Sarah and Jordan get into an argument with the party's host Travis, although as payback for Travis' rudeness Jordan uses his super breath to freeze Travis' new SUV birthday gift. Jordan later learns of his mother's diagnosis. To show their support and encouragement to Lois, the Kent twins along with Natalie decide to gift her with a watch that belonged to Natalie's mother. The watch is stolen when inside Jonathan's truck while at school the next day, which Jordan and Natalie deduce was taken by Candice's father after Jonathan brings up his interest in his truck the previous night. Locating the truck after school, Jordan uses his powers while Natalie uses her armor to help Jon successfully steal his truck back after which Natalie gives the watch to Lois after its returned by Candice. After helping his dad deal with a forest fire, Jordan gets slightly chewed out over his carelessness after Sam shows him pictures of satellite images which showed Jordan's hair after his hood briefly fell down. Jordan argues with Sam over whether or not he should get his hair cut, but they later reconcile after Sam gives Jordan his own suit to better hide his identity when operating as a superhero. Jordan eventually becomes frustrated after Clark's insistence that he is not ready to be a superhero and being given more and more training tests one after another. After Superman is tricked into an ambush by Intergang, Jordan manages to save his father and is shot with kryptonite in the process. Even though the kryptonite briefly incapacitates him, Jordan discovers that due to being half-human, kryptonite does not seem to affect him the way it does normal Kryptonians, with Clark even speculating that Jordan could have the potential to even surpass him in power.

In season four, Jordan later helps Lois rescue Sam. Following Superman's return, Jordan has stopped using his powers and has refused to discuss Luthor's phone call with Lois and refuses to join Clark and Jon with training it becomes clear Jordan is struggling emotionally and mentally and after a discussion with Sarah, he decides to take a step back from superhero activities and passes his super suit to Jon for him to use. Jordan and Jonathan later attempted to help their father fight Doomsday and Lex, during which Jordan gains his solar flare ability that he uses to save Jonathan. Following Lex's defeat, Jordan attended the wedding of Lana and John one year later. Jordan gained his own Superman-like suit and assists his father in his crimefighting. Jordan grew up, got married, and was present with his brother at the deaths of their parents.

- Alex Garfin also portrays Jordan's Bizarro counterpart, who lacks powers. He helps his mother and grandfather in a small resistance against his world's Ally Allston.

=== Kyle Cushing ===
Kyle Cushing (portrayed by Erik Valdez) is Lana's ex-husband and the father of Sarah and Sophie. He is Smallville's fire chief.

In season two, Kyle supports Lana's campaign to become the next Mayor of Smallville after the original candidate Daniel Hart dropped out. His previous affair with Tonya Martinz was found out by Sarah which partially affects her quinceañera. While Lana forgave him, Kyle was advised to move out. At Aubrey's advice, Sarah visits Kyle outside the liquor store. Kyle later helps Lana rehearse for the debate on family values against Mayor Dean. While fighting a fire at a warehouse that contained X-Kryptonite, Kyle was injured by a fire tornado and was secretly rescued by Jordan. As Ally Allston started to merge Earth-Prime and Bizarro World, Kyle suddenly disappeared. This landed him on Bizarro World where Lois states that what happened recently was not his fault. After Ally was defeated, Kyle and Lana reconciled but Lana told him that although they will always be in each other's lives, things between them could never go back to how they were and that Kyle had to stop holding out hope that they would get back together.

In season three, Kyle and Lana have gotten a divorce and he later finds himself sleeping with Chrissy. He was visited by Lana at the scene of George Dean's murder. After hearing about the argument between Lana and Sarah, Kyle arranged a sit-down at the diner to settle this matter. He is among those who saw Clark deal with Emmitt Pergande. While taking Jonathan in as a trainee, he starts to get suspicious when one of the fires he had to put out had ice found inside. Clark is forced to reveal to Kyle that he is Superman when Kyle independently figures out that one of his sons (though not the correct one) has powers and will not let the issue go, at the same time that Peia makes her escape from the DOD. After hearing that Chrissy is pregnant and breaking the news to Lana, Kyle later proposes to her before the meteor shower.

In season four, Kyle meets Chrissy's mother when they plan their wedding. He is persuaded to have the party at the farm house when a pipe burst occurs at the courthouse. Kyle enlisted Coach Gaines to be the DJ and asked Clark to be the best man. After a later talk with Clark, Kyle agrees with Chrissy to postpone the wedding and just have a normal party. While planning to find a house for him and Chrissy, Kyle tries to sell his grill. Kyle and Chrissy later watch Janet Olsen's interview with Clark Kent where he revealed that he was Superman. Following Lex's defeat, Kyle was present at Lana and John's wedding one year later. Some years later following Lois' death, Kyle saves Clark after he has a heart attack.

=== Sarah Cortez ===
Sarah Cortez (née Cushing) (portrayed by Inde Navarrette) is Kyle and Lana's oldest daughter.

In season two, Sarah returned from camp and starts acting awkward around Jordan. She later revealed to him that she kissed a fellow camper named Aubrey for some unknown reason. At the advice of her mother, Sarah and Jordan work out this issue. There was even a mentioning that Sarah had an earlier suicide attempt at some point in her life. During her quinceañera, Sarah and Jordan overheard the discussion between Kyle and Sarah which Lana plans to settle at a later point. Sarah later invites Aubrey to the diner Victoria May's to talk about the issues with her family right now. Aubrey advises Sarah to talk with her father. When her mom wins the election, Sarah was saddened that Jordan was not present when the victory was announced and breaks up with him. Jordan tries to find ways to explain himself to Sarah. At the time when Ally Allston started to merge Earth-Prime and Bizarro World, Sarah witnessed Jordan using his powers on Lana-Rho and later confronted her mom about this. Their argument was interrupted when Sophie informed them that their father disappeared. After Ally was defeated, Sarah learns the truth about Jordan's abilities and that his father Clark Kent is Superman.

In season three, Sarah sports a shoulder-length hairstyle and agrees with Jordan that they should stay separated. After Lana scolds her for sneaking off the Metropolis, they end up in an argument where Lana regrettably slapped Sarah. After hearing about what happened, Kyle arranged a sit-down at Victoria May's to settle this matter. Sarah is among those who see Clark deal with Emmitt Pergande. Sarah reconnects with her childhood friend George Dean Jr. and later bonds with him at a drinking party where she brushes Jordan aside when he tries to join in on their conversation. This leads to the two having a falling out after an argument. The police later raid the party and while fleeing the scene with George Jr., Sarah almost hits a deer and ends up in a car crash where she almost dies, but she and Jr. are saved by Jordan in the nick of time. Sarah later gets charged with a D.U.I and gets grounded by her parents. Sarah later apologizes to Jordan about their argument, but Jordan refuses to accept her apology after he points out how she is only doing so out of guilt because he rescued her. This leads to Sarah spiraling down into a deep depression after she realizes all of her mistakes, which her parents try to help her out of. Sarah eventually ends up getting a job as a waitress at Victoria May's to gain a sense of responsibility as her first step of recovery from her depression and downward spiral.

In season four, Lana allows Sarah to study abroad so that she will not be targeted by Lex Luthor's men. Jonathan and Jordan start by flying her to the Greek islands. Following Lex's defeat one year later, Sarah attends the wedding of her mother and John.

=== John Henry Irons ===
John Henry Irons (portrayed by Wolé Parks) is a mysterious and solo survivor from an unidentified parallel Earth. Introduced under the alias of "Captain Luthor", this version is from an unidentified alternate Earth that was ravaged by an army of evil Kryptonians, engineered by his Earth's Tal-Rho and led by Superman. Additionally, he was married to his Earth's Lois Lane and had a daughter named Natalie. After Lois exposed the Kryptonians' weakness to Kryptonite on the news, she was killed by Superman. In response, John and Nat built a suit of armor and incorporated an A.I. named Hedy he took from his Earth's Lex Luthor. As he was unable to reprogram its recognition protocols, John was forced to go by "Captain Luthor". At some point prior to his Earth's destruction, John makes his way to Earth-Prime and witnesses its Superman.

Convinced he will inevitably turn evil, John hunts down Earth-Prime Superman. Along the way, he encounters Earth-Prime's Lois, introduces himself as "Marcus Bridgewater", and offers to help her investigate Morgan, leading to them finding X-Kryptonite. After finishing his hammer, John uses Lois to arrange a meeting with Superman and beats him after weakening him with red solar flares. Upon having Lt. Reno Rosetti run the prints on the box he gave them to see if he was related to Lex Luthor, she learned that "Marcus" is a variation of John Henry Irons. Meanwhile, having obtained John's fingerprints to see if he was related to Luthor, Lois deduces John's identity and joins forces with her sons, Jonathan and Jordan, to save Superman while the Department of Defense take John into their custody. While being interrogated by Superman, John briefly reminisces on his past and how he got to Earth-Prime before warning Superman that Earth-Prime will go through what his Earth did. However, Lois convinces John that her Superman is nothing like the ones from his Earth. John later helps Superman in his fight against Tal-Rho. Afterwards, John is surprised by the arrival of Natalie.

In season two, John works to help Natalie adjust to Earth-Prime when they are in Metropolis. When this fails and she has a talk with Natalie, Lois allows them to move in with them. John even helps her in measuring the tremors at the Shuster Mine. He was present when Clark tells Lois about his visions being tied to an "invasive cosmological event". Following a fight with Bizarro, John receives help from Natalie on repairing the armor. In a later fight with Bizarro, John was beaten up enough to end up in the hospital's ICU. After getting out, Clark was able to have John and Natalie move into a house that was owned by an old friend of his. When Superman entered the Inverse World, John had to cover for him and even joined Natalie in honoring the memory of their Lois. John later found out that Natalie had made her own super-suit and could not destroy it due to being coated in a lacquer made from X-Kryptonite. After Superman defeated Ally, she and her Bizarro counterpart were handed over to John and Natalie. Sometime later, John was approached by John Diggle who was looking for answers on why this Earth's John Henry Irons was killed by Bruno Mannheim.

In season three, John joins the DOD and sets up a perimeter around Lana's house in case of another attacker. After helping Superman defeat Mike Gunn, John analyzes the gauntlets he used. Comparing them to the rockets on his armor, John finds out that they are similar. After a talk with Clark, John goes to Metropolis and meets this world's version of his sister Dr. Darlene Irons while mentioning that he is not from this Earth. Upon learning about his counterpart from Darlene, John was later visited by Elias Orr who stated that Bruno Mannheim wanted to meet him. When meeting John, Bruno mentioned his awareness of John not being his John, that this Earth's John wanted to be a hero, and the allegations towards Bruno. Wanting to know who smart this John is, Bruno had arranged Darlene to be strapped to a bomb that was made by this Earth's John. Upon locating her and disarming the bomb, John went back to Bruno who stated that he has Intergang members on standby to target his counterpart's other relatives. During the latest visit with Darlene, John learns that the restaurant that Matteo Mannheim took Natalie to meet her parents at was where her John met with Bruno. When John arrived, Bruno had Natalie and Matteo evacuated so that he and his men can deal with John. Upon John summoning his armor, Peia went on the attack even when Superman arrived to help. Following the incident, John had to confiscate Natalie's phone as a precaution.

In season four, John Henry Irons and Natalie are recalled by Sam Lane to assist with the DOD and help fight Doomsday. In addition, they are given the services of Squad K. Neither John or Natalie were able to take down Doomsday with their weaponry. John leads a DOD team into raiding Milton's hideout and getting him to shut down the signal preventing Lois' broadcast. One year later following Lex's defeat, John and Lana got married. He later makes a new suit complete with a cape as he joins Superman in his crimefighting.

- Parks' image was also used to portray the John Henry Irons from Superman and Lois' Earth who is mentioned to have been killed in action. The season two finale revealed that this John was killed by Bruno Mannheim during the discussion above. He is also revealed to have a sister named Dr. Irons and was said to have sold some weapons to Bruno Mannheim until he started to have a change of heart. Peia was revealed to have been the one who killed this Earth's John Henry Irons on Mannheim's orders seven years ago.

=== Tal-Rho / Morgan Edge ===
Morgan Edge (portrayed by Adam Rayner; main: season 1; special guest: season 2; Jack Rehbein as a 10-year-old, Ben Cockell as a 19-year-old Tal-Rho) is an intelligent, eloquent and impassioned self-made mogul" and CEO of Edge EnerCorp who has taken an interest in Smallville, raising suspicion from Lois. In Smallville, Edge's company Edge EnerCorp gains ownership of a mine that contains X-Kryptonite which he plans to use to continue experiments in an attempt to create a superpowered army. His previous experiments resulted in only one non-flawed subject, his assistant Leslie Larr. His work in Smallville brings him into further conflict with Lois Lane and an alternate John Henry Irons, who comes from an Earth where a similar army led by Superman ravaged Metropolis and murdered John's wife, Lois. Edge is later revealed to be a Kryptonian named Tal-Rho, the son of Lara Lor-Van and Zeta-Rho, and Superman's maternal half-brother.

His escape pod landed in England, where he came into conflict with the local townspeople. He was captured and experimented on before managing to escape, causing him to hate mankind. His goal is to resurrect Krypton on Earth by implanting Kryptonian consciousnesses into human hosts using the X-Kryptonite and the Eradicator. Upon finding Superman's body at the Fortress of Solitude following the defeat of most of the Subjekts, Tal-Rho uses Kryptonian technology to review Superman's memories, discovering his human family. With his family threatened, Superman agrees to accompany Tal-Rho to his hideout where the A.I. of Zeta-Rho instructs Tal-Rho to use the Eradicator on him and implant the consciousness of General Zod inside him. After the attempt is thwarted during a fight with John, Tal-Rho is defeated with the Eradicator not being found and is placed in a Kryptonite cell. What nobody knows is that Tal-Rho had somehow become fused with the Eradicator which enables him to overcome the Kryptonite and begin his next plot that involves placing a copy of Zeta-Rho into Jordan due to Jordan's Kryptonian powers. Superman and John are able to defeat Tal-Rho and remove Zeta-Rho from Jordan. Tal-Rho and Leslie are both placed in DOD custody.

In season two, Tal-Rho is kept in a special cell that has red solar lights. Superman visits him to see if there were side-effects to the Eradicator conscious due to the painful visions he has been experiencing. Tal-Rho mentions that he has not experienced them while also claiming that he lost his powers in the solar flare that Irons caused. When the vision happens again following a hostage crisis caused by Phillip Karnowski, Superman gives in to Tal-Rho's deal to make use of his lair as Jordan comes with Superman to keep an eye on Tal-Rho. As Tal-Rho activates the A.I. copy of Lara as she scans Superman, he starts to have the visions again as Jordan learns that Tal-Rho faked losing his powers. After a brief scuffle between Superman and Tal-Rho, Lara tells Superman that his visions are the result of an "invasive cosmological event" and tells Tal-Rho that there might be some good in him. Tal-Rho is later returned to his cell. When Superman ends up locked in Tal-Rho's cell by General Mitchell Anderson, Tal-Rho is tortured so that Superman can get Anderson the location of Bizarro. Thanks to a later tactic from Bizarro, Superman and Tal-Rho escape from their cell as Superman follows Tal-Rho to his fortress. With Lara's A.I. translating, Tal-Rho learned that his Bizarro counterpart was inseparable from Bizarro until Bizarro Tal-Rho's wife (the Lana Lang of the Inverse World) tried to kill him. Before Tal-Rho can ask who his wife was, they are attacked by Anderson who was powered with Project 7734 weapons and X-Kryptonite. When Anderson fires a Kryptonite gun at Superman, Tal-Rho jumps in front of him. As Anderson fights Bizarro, Superman uses his heat vision on the Kryptonite shards and flies Tal-Rho to the sun. Back in his cell, Tal-Rho is informed by Superman that Bizarro is dead and Anderson is at large. Before Superman departs, Tal-Rho has him forward his apology to Jordan. Superman later has Tal-Rho released so that he can help destroy Ally Allston's pendant, and makes amends with Lois. During this plan in an active volcano, Superman and Tal-Rho are ambushed by Ally. With help from John, Superman and Tal-Rho fend Ally off and destroy the pendant. Though Tal-Rho flees, he later returns to help Superman regain his powers so that he can defeat Ally. Once Ally is defeated, Tal-Rho sends Jonathan and Jordan two trucks as a sign of apology, and relocates to the Inverse World.

- Adam Rayner also portrays Tal-Rho's Bizarro counterpart who was on good terms with Bizarro and was named by a magazine to be an eligible bachelor. In addition, he is married to his world's Lana Lang. Tal-Rho's relationship with his brother was strained due to a disagreement about their world's Ally Allston. He and Lana later accompanied both versions of Ally Allston in claiming the pendant from Superman and Mitch Anderson. After Anderson was killed by Jon-El and both versions of Ally Allston start to merge while sending Jon-El to merge with his counterpart, Tal-Rho blows down Lana and allows Superman to go after Jon-El. While imprisoned for this action, Ally Allston visited Tal-Rho's cell. When he asks to see his wife, Ally states that she will not see him anymore as she drains his lifeforce from his body.

=== Sam Lane ===
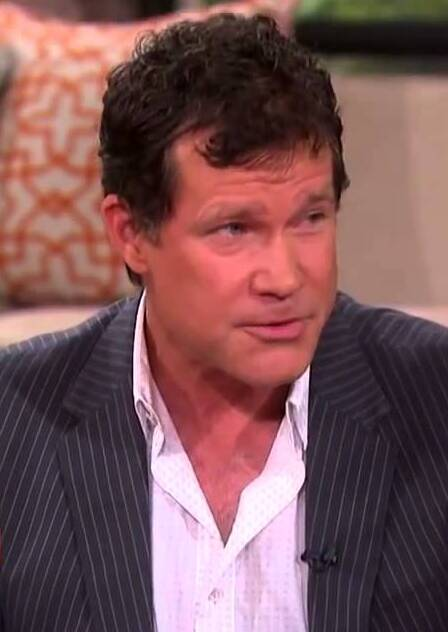
Dylan Walsh played Sam.

Sam Lane (portrayed by Dylan Walsh) is Lois Lane's father, Jonathan and Jordan's grandfather, and an Army general who is determined to keep America and the world safe from all threats. Following the fight against Tal-Rho, Sam tells John Henry Irons that he is planning on retiring from active duty.

In season two, Sam Lane is called to the Kent farm by Lois when Superman starts suffering from visions caused by an "invasive cosmological event". While advising Superman to settle his difference with Mitch Anderson, Sam uses his connections to help get John access to the Shuster Mine and was hesitant to help Lois get through to Lucy. He does come through for her. Sam later scrambles the security footage in the Oyelowo family store after Jordan secretly uses his freezing breath to stop some possible shoplifters. He does agree to train Jordan in secret. Sam later found out that Mitch Anderson has arrested Superman for treason. After Anderson stole Project 7734 weapons and X-Kryptonite as well as killing Bizarro, Sam informs Lois and Clark that he has talked General Hardcastle into letting him lead the manhunt for Anderson as it turned out that Sam had recommended him as his successor. After Ally was apprehended, Sam was visited by Lucy who secretly spiked his drink so that she can claim his DOD access card and have Ally travel to meet her counterpart. Lois later learns that Sam was training Jordan at the time an investigation at a burnt-down warehouse containing X-Kryptonite was conducted. After Jonathan comes clean about Candice being associated with the X-Kryptonite distribution and her father being broke, Sam agreed with Jonathan to keep her anonymous. At the location of an X-Kryptonite distribution area, Sam and Lois were captured by a criminal powered by X-Kryptonite causing Lois to allow Jordan to fight them. When Sam and Lois find Lucy with the remaining followers of Ally Allston, he had to briefly handcuff himself to Lucy to get Lucy to hear them out. Upon Allston's arrival, she badly weakened Sam to draw Superman to her. After Allston got away, Lucy stayed by Sam's side at the DOD's infirmary where he forgave her. After recovering and having a brief trip to Bizarro World, Sam was able to help Lucy relocate to Metropolis following Ally's defeat.

In season three, Sam rejoins the DOD. He tries to get Natalie to enroll in a DOD-sponsored academy which led to him getting reprimanded by John. Sam later apologizes to Natalie during Jonathan and Jordan's birthday party. He starts to get concerned that Jordan's hair would give him away to satellite images which led to an argument between them. Clark and Lois would hear about what happened and advised Jordan to apologize to Sam and take his advice. Sam and General Hardcastle later informed Superman about how Intergang got a hold of his blood samples that was harvested from him when he was recuperating from Ally Allston's attack. To avoid another theft, Superman used his heat vision on the blood samples. After giving Jordan his forgiveness, Sam stated that he found an alternative to avoid Jordan being identified by giving him a special suit and his father's aviation goggles before going fishing. When Sam gets a date with a woman named Gretchen, he learns too late that she is working for Lex Luthor as she and Otis Grisham abduct him.

In season four, Sam is killed by Doomsday. His body is taken to the fortress, where his heart is transplanted into Clark's body. As the Kent and Irons family mourn his death at his funeral, Superman's new heart revives him as he awakens within the fortress. However, it starts to cause Superman to slowly lose his powers when John's scan shows that it is starting to become non-compatible with Clark.

- Dylan Walsh also portrays a version of Sam Lane from John Henry Irons' Earth who was killed in conflict against his world's version of Superman.
- Dylan Walsh also portrays Sam Lane's Bizarro counterpart. He was the head of the DEO before his world's version of Ally Allston rose to power and later assisted his Lois and Jordan in a small resistance against Allston.

=== Lana Lang ===
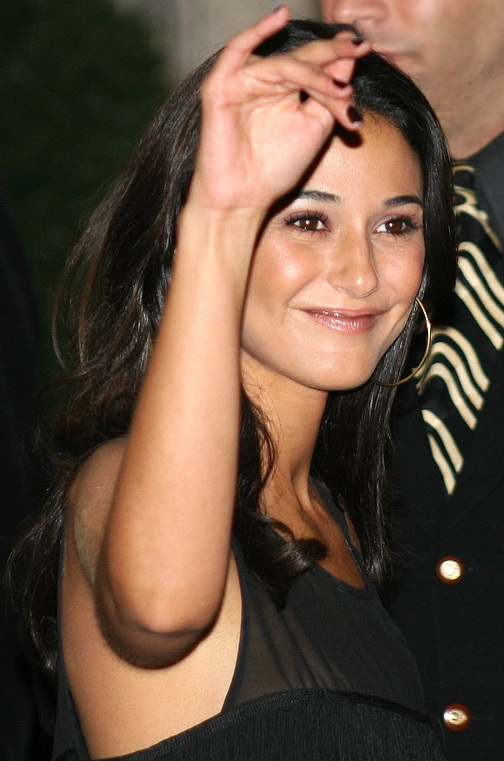
Emmanuelle Chriqui played Lana.

Lana Lang (portrayed by Emmanuelle Chriqui Milana Hryschenko as a child, Sara Rizk when in grade school, Emma Newton as a teenager) is an old friend of Clark and the loan officer at Smallville Bank. She is married to Kyle and the mother of Sophie and Sarah. In addition, she is also the cheerleader coach at Smallville High School. Due to what Tal-Rho did in Smallville causing the civilians to blame her and Kyle, Lana becomes appalled when she overhears Mayor George Dean talking negative things about them. Lana and Kyle are later forgiven by the citizens of Smallville following Tal-Rho's defeat.

In season two, Lana becomes the campaign manager of Daniel Hart during the mayoral election against Mayor George Dean. She hits a snag in the campaign when Daniel drops out due to having been offered a job in another town. While looking for another candidate, Kyle tells Lana that his fellow firefighters support the idea that she should run for Mayor of Smallville. Lana agrees with him on that. As she works on her campaign, Lana hears about Sarah's camp experience and gives her some advice to work it out with Jordan. During Sarah's quinceañera, Lana finds out about Sarah overhearing Kyle's discussion with Tonya Martinez which she states will be settled on another day. After getting some information from Tonya, Lana forgives Kyle. Though she advises him to move out for a while. After a talk with Lois, Lana crashes Mayor Dean's latest campaign and persuades those in attendance not to fall for the family affair thing. Lana gets assistance from Kyle on the rehearsal of her "family values" debate against Mayor Dean. On the day of the election, Lana defends Jonathan from Barb Dodge's negative comments and sends those involved in her campaign to obtain some voters. When the results were in, Lana was told by Emily Phan that she has won the election. While moving in her stuff to Smallville City Hall, Lana is abducted by Jon-El and used as bait to lure Superman into a Kryptonite trap. While summoning Bizarro Lana to come to Earth, Jon-El goes after Jonathan as Lana works to remove the Kryptonite shards from Superman. Following Jon-El's defeat and with the support of his family, Clark reveals that he is Superman to Lana. This briefly put a strain on her friendship with Clark and Lois. After being informed about Lana-Rho by Clark and Lois, Lana advises them not to interact with her or her family for a while. When Ally Allston was merging Earth-Prime and Bizarro World, Lana held a town meeting at Smallville High School to tell them the truth. George Dean led the townspeople into not believing her until Superman confirmed her case. While getting Sarah, she got a glimpse at Lana-Rho before Jordan fought her and revealed his powers to Sarah. Sarah later argued with her mother about withholding this information until Sophie informed them that their father disappeared. After Ally Allston was defeated, Lana held a celebration to thank Superman and reconciled with Kyle, but decided in the end not to get back together with him.

In season three, Lana and Kyle have gotten a divorce. Principal Balcomb informs Lana about the mold in the school which Clark confirms to her. When George Dean shows up at Jonathan and Jordan's birthday party to get her to return the funds she reallocated, John Henry Irons came to her defense as George leaves stating that she does not know what she is getting herself into. After Dean was found murdered, Lana uses the last lines he said to him prior to his death to head to city hall with John. They find a drive behind a plaque. Before it can be fully uploaded, they are attacked by the hooded figure who uses a sound attack on them as she makes off with the drive and destroys the laptop. John later places a perimeter around Lana's house just in case another attacker comes after her. After Lana gets into an argument with Sarah about her sneaking off to Metropolis, she regrettably slaps her. Kyle hears about what happened and arranges a sit-down at the diner Victoria May's to settle this matter. She was among those who saw Clark deal with Emmitt Pergande. Lana later finds out that Chrissy is seeing Kyle when Sofie left Kyle's apartment. While dating John, Lana hears from Kyle that Chrissy is pregnant.

In season four, Lana deflects some Smallville citizens in getting close to the Kent family and Superman's body. She later visits the Kent family where Lana tells Lois that Chuck Arden put two and two together as he also lost his wife. Sarah confronts Lana about LuthorCorp's purchases done through a shell company. Lana later visits Victoria May's that Lex Luthor is dining at and scolds her for interacting with her only for them to find that Lex has left. She manages to evacuate Jonathan from Lex's hotel room before Lex can return. After persuading Aidy Manning to go back on Lex Luthor's deal with her, Lana is attacked by Otis Grisham in her home only for Sarah to knock out Otis. While a police car remains outside, Lana takes up Sarah's suggestion for her to study abroad. During Superman's fight with Doomsday and Lex, Lana helped to broadcast her proof about Lex. One year later following the defeat of Lex, Lana and John got married.

- Emmanuelle Chriqui also portrays a Bizarro version of Lana Lang called Lana-Rho who defends Ally Allston from Bizarro. This version was a former waitress before she married her world's version of Tal-Rho and later gained superpowers. She and Tal-Rho accompanied both versions of Ally Allston in reclaiming the pendant from Superman and Anderson. After both versions of Ally start to merge and Jon-El is sent to merge with his counterpart, Lana was blown down by Tal-Rho so that Superman can go after Jon-El. When Jon-El abducted Lana, he called Bizarro Lana to Earth. She arrived and ended up fighting John Henry Irons and Natalie. Bizarro Lana beat up John before Natalie stabbed her with X-Kryptonite causing Bizarro Lana to fall back to her world. After weakening Superman, Allston begins to merge both worlds while sending Lana-Rho to finish off Superman. She and Jon-El were defeated by Jordan and Natalie Irons.

=== Chrissy Beppo ===
Chrissy Beppo (portrayed by Sofia Hasmik; main: seasons 2–4; recurring: season 1) is a journalist and proprietor of the Smallville Gazette who Lois works with. By the end of season one, Lois buys half of the Smallville Gazette to keep it from being sold to someone else.

In season two, Chrissy looks for recruits for the Smallville Gazette as Lois is displeased with some of her choices. Due to a podcast causing some of Lois' sources to recant the stories she published like the one on cult leader Ally Alston, Chrissy is persuaded by Lois that they have to prove one of them by looking for Lois' sister Lucy. At Ally Allston's event in New Carthage, Chrissy infiltrates it under the alias of Penelope Collins. Ally sees through Chrissy's disguise and plays the live footage of Lois and Lucy's argument which puts a strain on Lois and Chrissy's friendship. After being fed drugged tea by Ally during a talk with her, Chrissy was put through the Inverse Method where she saw her Bizarro counterpart. She later mentioned to Lois about her counterpart being afraid of her father and Ally having supposedly taken over the United States of America on that world. After Ally was defeated, Chrissy learns from Lois that Clark is Superman.

In season three, Chrissy gains Clark as a new employee and finds herself sleeping with Kyle. Chrissy later tells Kyle that she is pregnant as Lana, Sarah, Sophie, Lois, and Clark are informed. Before the meteor shower, Kyle proposes to Chrissy.

In season four, Chrissy is visited by her mother when she and Kyle dine with her at Victoria May's where it was mentioned that Chrissy's father could not make it. Lois becomes her made of honor. After slipping away from the party, Chrissy is confronted on a bench by Lois. After a talk with her, Chrissy and Kyle announce that they will postpone their wedding and just have a party. She finds that her mother is OK with it. Chrissy wanted to sell her share of the Smallvilel Gazette to afford a new house for her and Kyle. Lois and Clark offered to help them out while having dinner with them at Victoria May's. Chrissy and Kyle later watched Clark Kent's interview with Janet Olsen where he revealed that he was Superman. One year later following Lex's defeat, Chrissy, Kyle, and their baby attend the wedding of Lana and John. Chrissy is expecting another child.

- Sofia Hasmik also portrays Chrissy's Bizarro counterpart. While operating the Smallville Gazette with her staff, Mitch Anderson shows up and arranges for her to silently get a message to Lois for her. Chrissy was able to secretly get the message to her.

=== Natalie Lane Irons ===
Natalie Lane Irons (portrayed by Tayler Buck; seasons 2–4; guest season 1) is the daughter of the alternate John Henry Irons and Lois Lane from an unidentified parallel Earth. She helped her father to work on his armor when facing the alternate Superman and an army of Kryptonians. When the Crisis hit, Natalie was put under a hibernation by the A.I. Hedy until it can locate the Earth where her father is on. By the end of season one, a vessel carrying Natalie arrives on Earth-Prime. As Natalie reunites with her dad, she sees Lois and mistakes her for her mother.

In season two, Natalie works to adjust to Earth-Prime when operating in Metropolis where she cannot interact with Earth-Prime's version of her friends. This became rocky enough that John had to persuade Lois to speak to Natalie. This leads to the Irons family moving in with the Kent family. She later befriends Sarah Cushing and helps her with the car that Sarah and Kyle were working on. While having noticed that her father is still make use of the armor, Natalie agrees to help John in repairing it. On the day when Lana became the new Mayor of Smallville, Natalie started honoring the memory of her mother as John later joins her in it. Natalie later starts working on her version of her father's armor. John later found out about the armor and tried to destroy it to no avail as Hedy reveals that Natalie had coated it in a lacquer made from X-Kryptonite. After her father was defeated by Ally, Natalie rescued him despite the buggy message to bring X-Kryptonite. Both of them were rescued by Superman before Ally can harm them. After Superman defeated Ally, she and her Bizarro counterpart were handed over to John and Natalie.

In season three, Sam invites Natalie to a movie and tries to get her to enroll in a DOD-sponsored academy. This did not go well and Sam was reprimanded by John. During Jonathan and Jordan's birthday party, Sam apologized to Natalie. With Smallville High temporarily closed due to black mold remediation, Natalie is convinced by Sarah to attend a party in Metropolis hosted by the doppelganger of a boy named Travis who Natalie had a crush on in her original world. After getting to the party and learning that Travis already has a girlfriend, Natalie meets and bonds with a boy named Matteo, but is forced to leave the party early before she can get his contact information due to Sarah and Jordan getting into a fight with Travis and his friends. After Lois informs her friends and family of her diagnosis of breast cancer, Natalie convinces the Kent twins to show their support with her by gifting their mother with a watch that belonged to Natalie's version of Lois. While at school, Jonathan's truck gets stolen while the gift watch was placed within the truck, which Natalie and Jordan deduce was stolen by Candice's dad after Jonathan brings up his interest in his truck the former night. After locating the truck, Natalie uses her armor while Jordan uses his powers to help Jon get his truck back and later gives Lois the gift watch after it was returned by Candice. Matteo later invites Natalie on a date where she will meet his parents Bruno Mannheim and Peia Mannheim. The dinner was crashed by John who learned about the restaurant from Darlene causing Bruno to have Natalie and Matteo evacuated. Following Superman and John's fight with Peia which led to her being placed under medical care in the DOD, John had to confiscate Natalie's phone as a precaution.

In season four, Natalie and her father are recalled by Sam Lane to join the DOD. They are provided upgrades to their armor and the services of Squad K. During Doomsday's attack near the DOD, neither Natalie or John were able to defeat Doomsday. After Sam Lane was killed by Doomsday, Natalie played the holographic will to Lois, Jonathan, and Jordan while John flew Sam to the Fortress of Solitude to have his empowered heart used to revive Superman. Her armor is later hacked by Milton Fine who uses it to attack Jonathan and Jordan only for it to be destroyed by them. One year later following Lex's defeat, Natalie attended the wedding of her father and Lana. She later gains a new suit as she joins Superman in his crimefighting.

=== Bruno Mannheim ===
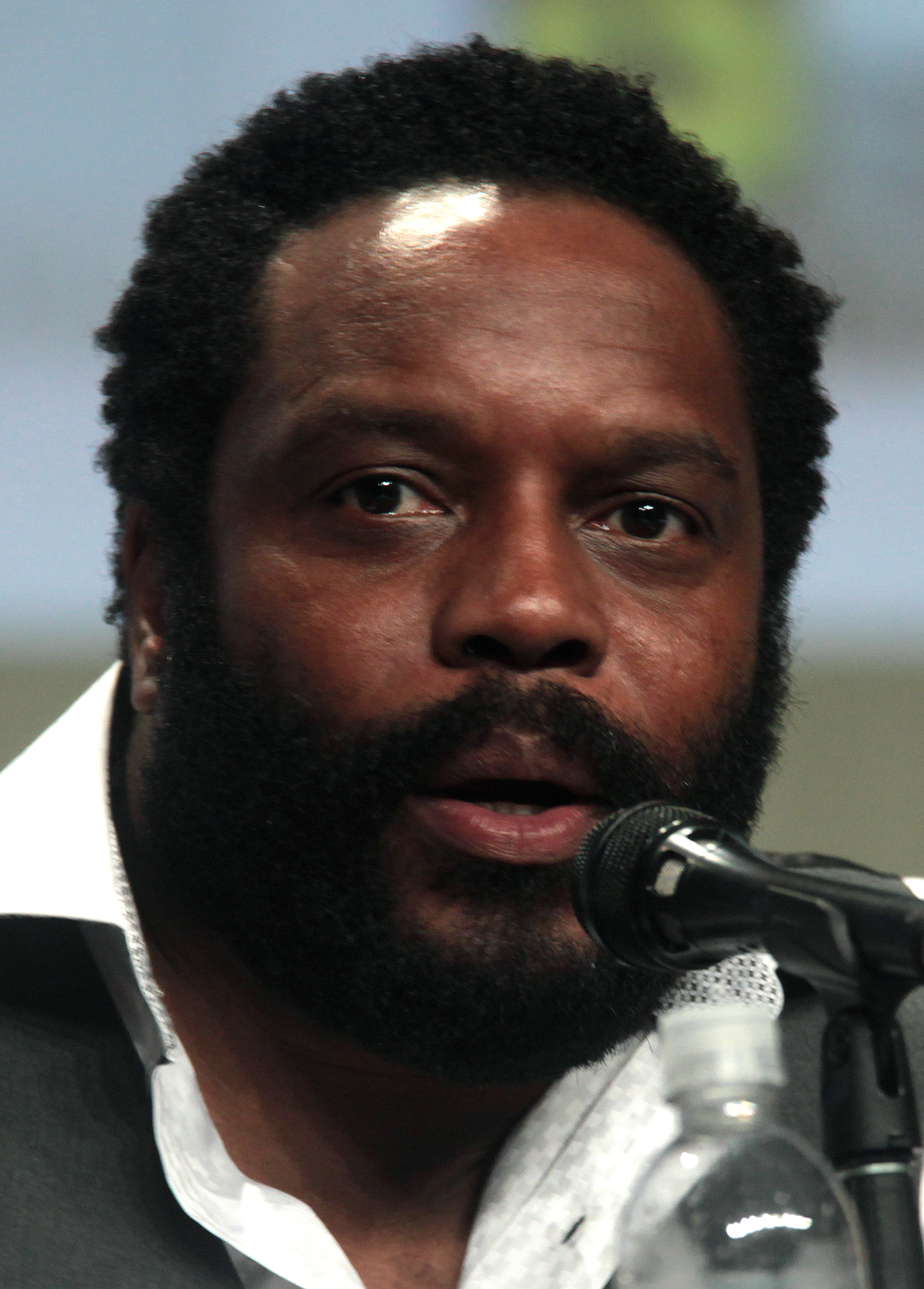
Chad L. Coleman played Bruno.

Bruno Mannheim (portrayed by Chad L. Coleman; seasons 3–4) is a businessman and the leader of Intergang who has used tactics to avoid arrest. At some point, Antony "Boss" Moxie would found and lead the first iteration of Intergang in Metropolis. However, he would later be killed by Peia after she turned on him when ordered to kill Bruno Mannheim for disobeying him. This would lead to Mannheim taking over from him as leader of Intergang and the blame of his death would later be placed on Lex Luthor.

He is first seen when he has his scientists experiment on the corpse of Atom Man after his hooded robed minion snatched it after diverting Superman. Bruno Mannheim played a role in freeing Henry Miller and possibly getting him super powers. Superman believes that he was able to manipulate Judge Tara Reagan into letting him go which is later confirmed as Mannheim states that he is the self-proclaimed hope for the people of Suicide Slum. Later that night after getting the status of Henry Miller, Bruno is confronted by the hooded figure who stated that what was used on Henry's corpse is not working and also informs him about her encounter with someone that looks like John Henry Irons even though Mannheim had the figure kill Irons seven years ago. This led to Bruno arranging a meeting with John and seeing if he was smart as his counterpart by having Darlene Irons strapped to a bomb of his counterpart's making. After the bomb was disarmed, Bruno was confronted by John. Though John departed after Bruno mentioned that he has Intergang operatives on standby to target more of his counterpart's relatives. After Deadline's death, Bruno gets a status report on Dr. Hook's autopsy. His sound-manipulating operative is revealed to be his dying wife Peia. Bruno and Peia are revealed to have a son named Matteo. Bruno later met Natalie when Matteo invited her to dine with his family. The dinner at Bruno's restaurant was crashed by John causing Bruno to have Matteo and Natalie. Bruno and his men beat up John until he summoned his armor causing Peia to go on the attack. Superman showed up to help John as Peia collapses during her sound attacks due to her cancer spreading. Bruno allows Superman to fly Peia to the hospital as Matteo later argues with his dad about what happened. After a DOD search of Mannheim's apartment despite Superman being there first, Mannheim orders Dr. Hook to awaken Atom Man and send him to make John Henry Irons suffer. Following Atom Man's second death, Mannheim takes Matteo to a secret room to develop a cure for Peia. Both Bruno and Matteo are held at the D.O.D. following Peia's death with Bruno promising to cooperate with the D.O.D. if they can drop all charges they have against Matteo.

In season four, Lois visits Bruno Mannheim at Stryker's Prison. While pleased that the doctors at his hospital have completely treated Lois, Bruno did state that he should have left Luthor in prison and even mentioned that some of his former associates are dead as Luthor does not leave loose ends behind. After hearing that his former associate Cheryl Kimble might have fallen victim, Bruno agrees to help Lois in whatever way possible when she mentions that Luthor might go after his surviving family. As Lois leaves, Bruno has Lois tell Superman his congratulations on returning from the dead.

=== Lex Luthor ===
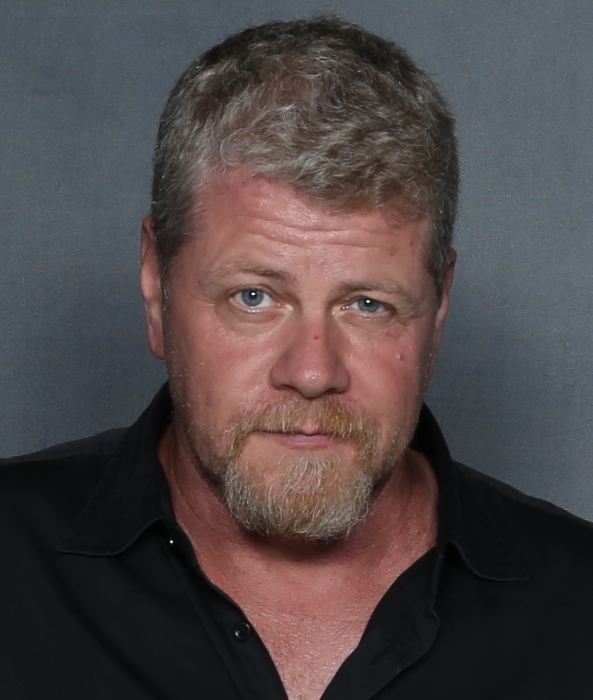
Michael Cudlitz played Lex.

Lex Luthor (portrayed by Michael Cudlitz as an adult, Kashton Brostl as a child, Oliver Mandelcorn as a teenager) is the CEO of LexCorp, Superman's archenemy, and the father of Elizabeth Luthor who secretly is behind different illegal activities. Peia Mannheim framed him for the death of Antony "Boss" Moxie which landed him with life at Stryker's Prison as his family life is strained. After having been beaten by Otis Grisham and his fellow inmates when Otis would not lend him the electric razor that he would use to shave his head, Lex Luthor uses his outside contacts to intimidate Warden William Ellis into working for him as Lex has the guards beat up Otis and those who beat Lex up. After Warden Ellis procured him a razor, Lex shaved his head. Following the death of Peia and her frame-up getting exposed, Lex was released from Stryker's Prison with Warden Ellis delaying the news. Luthor proceeded to walk all the way to the Kent family farm where he advised Lois to retired. Upon being picked up by Otis, Lex advises Lois to tell Superman that he will be coming for him next. Otis informs him that Dr. Aleister Hook has been dealt with as he is given Dr. Hook's bloody glasses. They find Bizarro feeding off rats as Bizarro bites off Otis's right ear in front of Lex. He assists Lex in his death experiments on Bizarro. Then Otis assists Gretchen Kelley in abducting Sam Lane. Confronting Superman at the Kent family farm, Lex uses a copy of Sam Lane's device to summon the monstrous Bizarro to him and instructs him to bring him Superman's heart when he has finished him off.

In season four, Lex Luthor moved into the hotel across from the Smallville Gazette and later meets with Amanda McCoy who has not located Elizabeth yet. Before having Otis and "Gretchen" bury Sam Lane alive, he shows Sam a newspaper article about Superman being in peril. When he hears that Sam has been rescued, Luthor instructs Otis and "Gretchen" to lay low for a while. After being defeated by Superman, Luthor is sentenced to life imprisonment at Stryker's Prison.

== Recurring characters ==
=== Introduced in season one ===
==== Sophie Cushing ====
Sophie Cushing (portrayed by Joselyn Picard) is the youngest daughter of Lana and Kyle and the sister of Sarah. In a discussion between Sarah and Lana, it is mentioned that Sophie picks on some of her classmates.

In season two, Sophie helps out in her mother's mayoral campaign. When Ally Allston started merging Earth-Prime and Bizarro World, Sophie witnesses her father disappear as she tells Lana and Sarah about it.

In season three, Sophie feels like she is being neglected by her family and runs out unnoticed from Kyle's apartment. Jonathan helps find her and tells him about his similar situation with his family. Sophie was present when Kyle informs Lana that Chrissy is pregnant as Sophie claims that she will not be the baby of the family anymore.

In season four, Sophie is present at Kyle and Chrissy's postponed wedding where she dances with Jonathan Kent. One year later following Lex Luthor's defeat, Sophie attends the wedding of her mother and John Henry Irons.

==== Leslie Larr ====
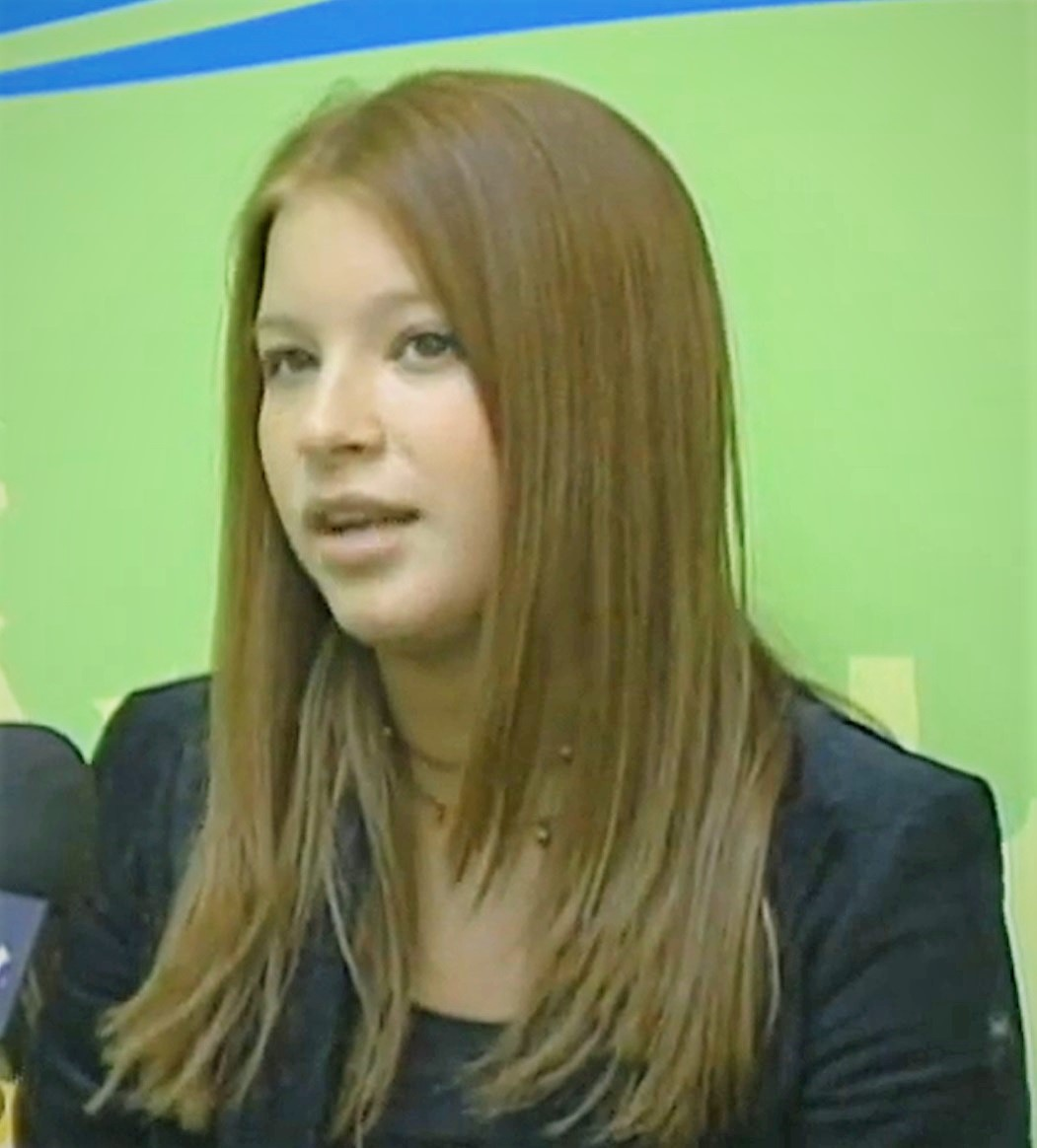
Stacey Farber played Leslie.

Born Irma Sayres, Leslie Larr (portrayed by Stacey Farber) is a woman with super-strength and heat vision who works as the personal assistant to Morgan Edge. Her abilities come from being experimented on by X-Kryptonite. She assisted her boss in his campaign to make the Earth people the hosts for the Kryptonian consciousness in the Eradicator. Both of them are defeated by Superman and John Henry Irons.

Larr is named after Lesla-Lar, a supporting character of Supergirl.

==== Jor-El ====
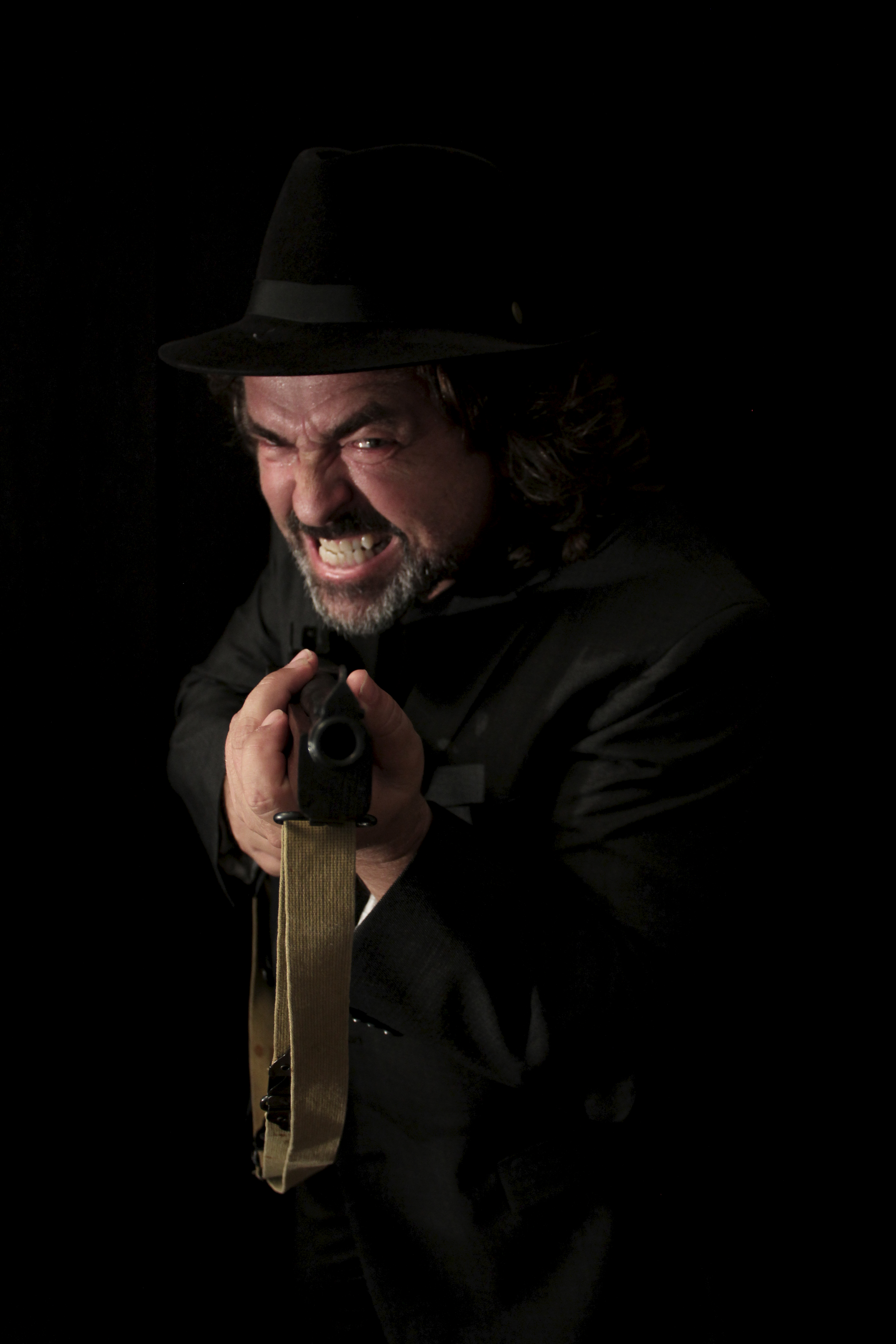
Angus Macfadyen plays Jor-El

Jor-El (portrayed by Angus Macfadyen) is Clark Kent's biological Kryptonian father. Though he died along with Krypton, a copy of his consciousness is encoded virtually as an AI within the arctic Fortress of Solitude in hologram form to provide guidance when his son seeks help. Before the crystal containing his A.I. was destroyed by Tal-Rho, Jor-El told Superman that he loves him. After Tal-Rho was defeated, Clark buried the broken crystal on the Kent family farm.

==== Hedy ====
Hedy (voiced by Daisy Tormé) is an A.I. that works for John Henry Irons and Natalie Irons after it was stolen from his Earth's Lex Luthor.

In season four, Hedy is hacked by Milton Fine.

==== Sean Smith ====
Sean Smith (portrayed by Fritzy-Klevans Destine) is a student at Smallville High School and football player on the Smallville Crows. He was Sarah's boyfriend and antagonizes the Kent brothers before she breaks up with him, but he later befriends them when Jordan apologizes to him for having kissed Sarah.

==== Tag Harris ====
Tag Harris (portrayed by Wern Lee) is a student at Smallville, a friend of Sean Smith, and a member of the Smallville Crows football team who developed vibration abilities upon being exposed to yellow phosphorescence (later revealed to be X-Kryptonite) the day Jordan's heat vision manifested.

In season two, Tag appears as a member of the Supermen of America. He is defeated by Bizarro, but survives the attack and is last seen recovering in hospital.

==== Timmy Ryan ====
Timmy Ryan (portrayed by Zane Clifford) is a student at Smallville High School who is a friend of Sean Smith and a member of the Smallville Crows football team.

In season two, Timmy Ryan gets stronger as Jonathan suspects that he is using steroids. When Jonathan confronts him on this, Timmy claims that he got a strange crystal that gave him his strength from Candice Pergande. He was later mentioned to have been caught with an inhaler with X-Kryptonite in it.

In season four, Timmy Ryan was among the Smallville citizens who witness Doomsday throwing the defeated Superman's body towards the Kent family. He later lashed out at Jonathan and Jordan, only for Kyle to defuse the situation.

==== Reno Rosetti ====
Lt. Reno Rosetti (portrayed by Hesham Hammoud) is a military lieutenant in the DOD who works for Sam Lane. He is later empowered by Morgan Edge through X-Kryptonite offscreen and fights Superman in Project 7734's room before being killed by a Kryptonite spear wielded by John Henry Irons.

- Hesham Hammoud also portrays Reno Rosetti's Bizarro counterpart. He was a member of the DOD before siding with his world's version of Ally Allston.

==== Gaines ====
Gaines (portrayed by Danny Wattley) is the football coach at Smallville High School who coaches the Smallvile Crows football team.

In season two, Gaines loses his football program when Jonathan Kent was suspected of being involved in the X-Kryptonite sales. When Barb Dodge blames Jonathan for what happened to the football program, Lana gets her to back off as Gaines makes a negative comment about it.

In season three, Gaines has taken a side job as a driving instructor where he gets Jonathan as a student while still resenting him for what happened to his football program. Despite some flaws during Jonathan's test, Gains allows Jonathan to pass. While overseeing the set-up for the meteor shower that he is overseen, Gaines gets some chairs unloaded by Jonathan who tries to get Gaines to forgive him to no avail. During the opening event, Gaines gave the hard work credit to Jimmy Chan. He even witnesses Kyle proposing to Chrissy.

In season four, Gaines has taken another side job as a DJ when hired to perform at Kyle and Chrissy's wedding and has taken Jimmy Chan in as an assistant. After Kyle and Chrissy announce their wedding postponement and just have a party, Gaines plays a Bon Jovi song and even dances with Jimmy. Somehow figuring out that Clark is Superman, Gaines finally forgives Jonathan when he approaches him and Jordan at Victoria May's to recruit them for the upcoming football season. When Jonathan states that he has been banned from football, Gaines says that he will find a way around it. Even though Jonathan was not interested, Gaines asks Jordan if he is interested.

- Danny Wattley also portrays Gaines' Bizarro counterpart.

==== Malcolm Teague ====
Malcolm Teague (portrayed by Austin Obiajunwa) is a student at Smallville High School who is a member of the Smallville Crows football team.

One year later following Lex's defeat, Malcolm attends the wedding of Lana Lang and John Henry Irons.

==== Cobb Branden ====
Cobb Branden (portrayed by Dee Jay Jackson) is a farmer who is a friend of the Kent family.

==== Denise Olowe ====
Denise Olowe (portrayed by Kelcey Mawema) is a cheerleader at Smallville High School. In season two, Denise begins working at her father's store, Brit & Dunn's Quick Mart.

==== George Dean ====
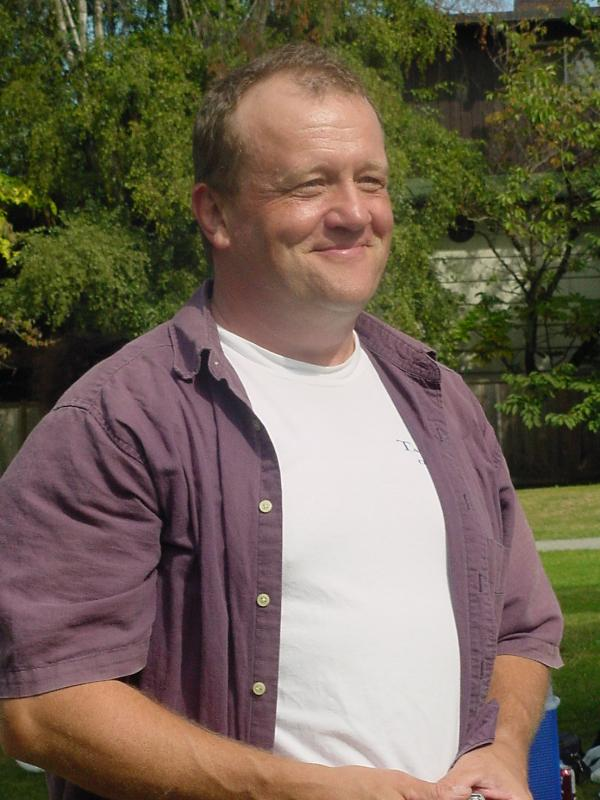
Eric Keenleyside played George.

George Dean (portrayed by Eric Keenleyside) was the Mayor of Smallville and the father of George Dean Jr. He and Lana later had a falling out when it came to Lana's family being pawns in Tal-Rho's plot.

In season two, Lana Lang successfully defeated George Dean in the mayoral election. At the time when Ally Allston was merging Earth with Bizarro World, he attended the town meeting at Smallville High School and was among those who doubted Lana's claim until Superman corroborated her information.

In season three, George Dean arrived at Jonathan and Jordan's birthday party where he tries to get Lana to return to allocated funds. After John Henry Irons orders him to leave, George does that as he states to Lana that she does not know what she is getting herself into. Before being killed by Peia Mannheim's sound attack, Dean calls up Lana and gives her a clue on what to find in her office.

==== Corey Wellnitz ====
Corey Wellnitz (portrayed by Pavel Romano) is a student at Smallville High School who is a member of the Smallville Crows football team. His parents own a lake house.

One year later following Lex Luthor's defeat, Corey attends the wedding of Lana Lang and John Henry Irons.

==== Aidy Manning ====
Aidy Manning (portrayed by Monique Phillips) is a resident of Smallville.

In season four, Aidy is among the Smallville citizens who witness Doomsday throw Superman's defeated body towards the Kent family. Lex Luthor later met with Aidy to donate her land so that the next LuthorCorp headquarters can be established. While it is implied to her and Clark that Aidy figured out that Clark is Superman, Lana Lang persuaded Aidy to go back on Lex's offer. One year later following Lex's defeat, Aidy attended the wedding of Mayor Lang and John Henry Irons.

==== Tamera Dalley ====
Tamera Dalley (portrayed by Tori Katonga) is a firefighter who works for the Smallville Fire Department.

==== Emily Phan ====
Emily Phan (portrayed by Leeah Wong) is the childhood friend of Lana Lang and later undergoes Morgan Edge's X-Kryptonite experiments. After being purified of the Kryptonian conscious, Emily is among the Smallville citizens who blame Lana and Kyle for trusting Morgan Edge. Though she later forgives them following Tal-Rho's defeat.

In season two, Emily gets involved in Lana's campaign to become the new Mayor of Smallville and informs Lana about the word on the street that Mayor George Dean would use some of Sarah's past in his re-election. She later informs Lana that she has won the election.

In season four, Emily is asked by Lana to look into which properties Lex Luthor may have bought in Smallville under shell companies to stop him taking over the town. One year later following Lex's defeat, Emily attended the wedding of Mayor Lang and John Henry Irons.

==== Duc Phan ====
Duc Phan (portrayed by Jay Zhang) is the husband of Emily Phan, who undergoes Morgan Edge's X-Kryptonite experiments. After Emily is purified of the Kryptonian conscious, Duc is among the Smallville citizens who blame Lana and Kyle for trusting Morgan Edge. Though he later forgives them following Tal-Rho's defeat.

One year later following Lex Luthor's defeat, Duc attended the wedding of Lana Lang and John Henry Irons.

=== Introduced in season two ===
==== Mitch Anderson ====
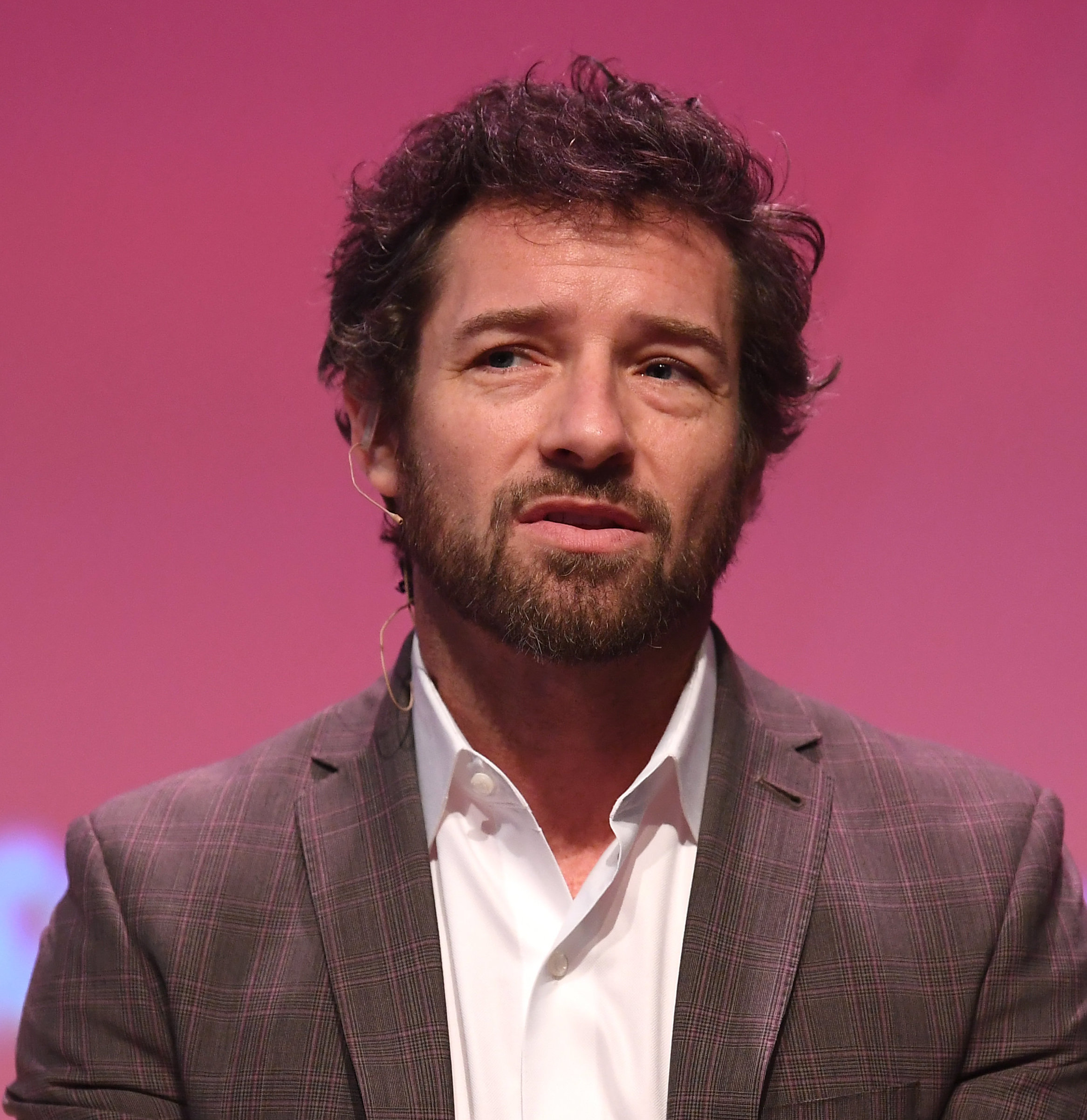
Ian Bohen played Mitch.

Lieutenant general Mitch Anderson (portrayed by Ian Bohen) is the metaphorical "new sheriff in town" at the DOD. His worldview divides into two types – those you serve and those who serve you. He does not like that Superman exists outside that paradigm and tries to bring the Man of Steel under his authority officially. He starts a superhero group that even includes Tag as one of his recruits. Due to Superman withholding information and not wanting to give up the pendant Bizarro was wearing as well as having been scolded by General Hardcastle, Anderson has Superman arrested for treason. Anderson tracks Superman and Tal-Rho to Tal-Rho's lair where he attacked them. After Anderson murders Bizarro, General Hardcastle orders a manhunt for Anderson, who went AWOL. Anderson later approached Ally Allston and gave her the pendant that was on Bizarro. After going through the same procedure as Chrissy, he relays the message to Ally from her Bizarro counterpart to come now. He was able to lead some of Ally's followers through the portal while Superman rescued Chrissy, Ally, and another one of Ally's followers. When he arrived, he was nearly absorbed by his Bizarro counterpart until Jon-El accidentally killed him with his heat breath. Anderson managed to escape and have the Bizarro version of Chrissy arrange a meeting with Lois. Upon learning about Bizarro's family, Anderson starts to regret his actions even when Superman arrives. While also apologizing for his actions toward Superman while seeing that he was right all along, Anderson helps Superman when both versions of Ally Allston and the Bizarro versions of Tal-Rho and Lana Lang arrived. Anderson was killed in battle with Jon-El.

- Bohen also portrays his Bizarro counterpart. He accompanied his world's Ally Allston in meeting the arrivals. When Anderson arrived, Bizarro Anderson tried to merge with him only to be accidentally killed by Jon-El's fire breath.

==== Candice Pergande ====
Candice Pergande (portrayed by Samantha Di Francesco) is Jonathan's latest girlfriend and the daughter of Emmitt Pergande. He later found out that he sold a special crystal that gave Timmy Ryan enhanced strength. Jonathan confronted her about and she stated that she needed to make money to keep herself and her father off the streets. Rather than break up with her, Jonathan asks for one of the crystals. When he tries to get rid of the X-Kryptonite, Jonathan had to take the blame to protect Candice when one of the dogs detected it. When Jonathan and Candice were threatened by rival X-Kryptonite distributor Mickey Jeroux, they are saved by Jordan. With some persuasion from Sam Lane following a warehouse fire that contained X-Kryptonite, Jonathan brings Candice over who comes clean with her involvement with the X-Kryptonite, her connection with Mickey Jeroux, and her father's financial problems. Sam agreed to Jonathan's suggestion to keep her anonymous to the press.

In season three, Candice gets into an argument with Jonathan about her father supposedly stealing his car. She would later apologize for what she said to Jon after finding the watch that was meant for Lois Lane in her father's stuff and confirming that Jonathan was right about her dad stealing his truck. While also having taken a job as a waitress at the diner Victoria May's, Candice witnesses her father being intimidated by Clark and learned what Emmitt did to Jonathan. Clark and Lois later allow Candice to temporarily stay with them after Emmitt leaves Smallville. She would later move in with an aunt in one of the neighboring towns.

In season four, her relationship with Jonathan briefly becomes strained when he tries to keep his secret of having developed Kryptonian powers by covering it as investigating a puppy adoption conspiracy with Lois, but Jordan tells Candice the truth and she and Jonathan reconcile. Though Candice breaks up with Jonathan after Clark reveals that he is Superman, Jonathan manages to talk her out of it. One year later following Lex Luthor's defeat, Candice attended the wedding of Lana Lang and John Henry Irons.

==== Lara ====
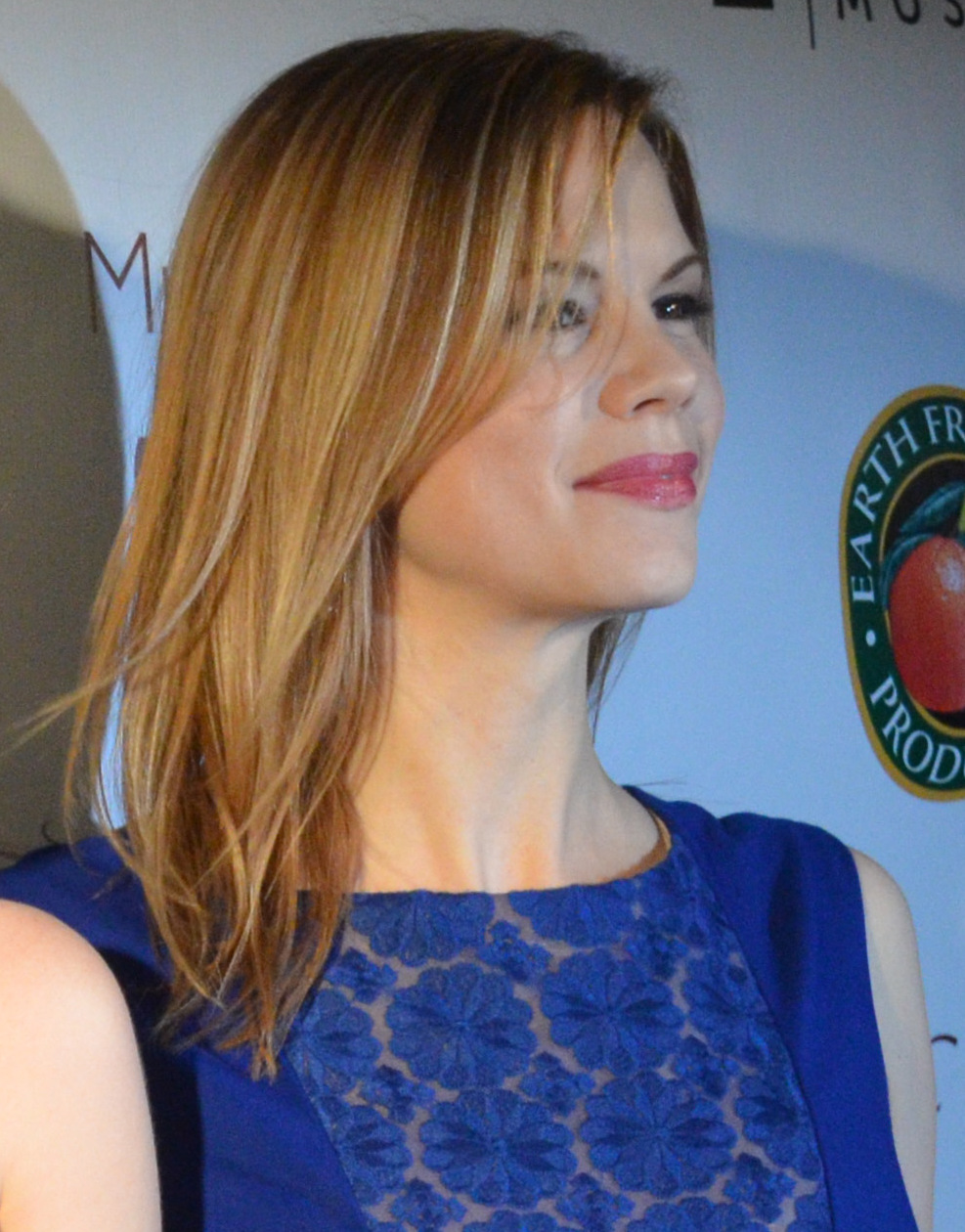
Mariana Klaveno played Lara.

Lara Lor-Van (portrayed by Mariana Klaveno) is the mother of Superman through Jor-El and Tal-Rho through Zeta-Rho. Like Jor-El and Zeta-Rho, a copy of her consciousness is encoded virtually as an A.I. within Tal-Rho's desert hideout in hologram form. While pleased to see her sons and displeased with Zeta-Rho's manipulation of Tal-Rho, Lara scans Superman to find the source of his visions. After Superman's latest vision and his brief fight with Tal-Rho, Lara reveals to Superman that his visions are tied to an "invasive cosmological event" and states to Tal-Rho that there might be some good in him. Her revelation lead to the arrival of Bizarro.

In season three, Lara's A.I. is placed in the Kent family's Fortress of Solitude. Clark would later mention to Sam that Lara was informed of Lois' diagnosis and that there's nothing in the Fortress of Solitude that could help her.

In season four, Lara's A.I. had to put Clark's body in stasis after Doomsday took his heart out. She would later help put Sam's empowered heart into Superman following Sam's death.

- Mariana Klaveno portrays the Bizarro version of Lara Lor-Van's A.I. who learns the fate of her son from Superman before being turned off by Jon-El.

==== Ally Allston ====
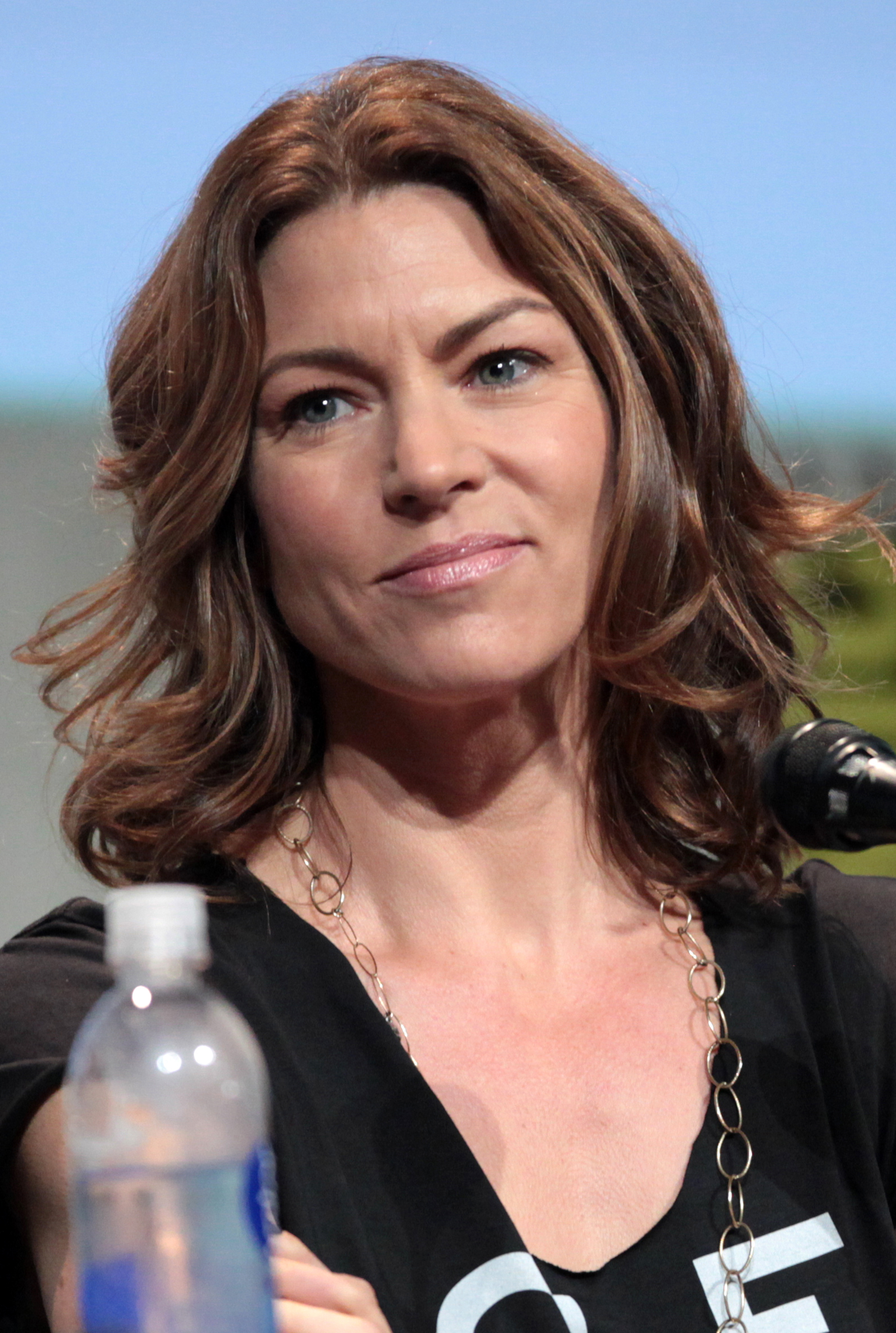
Rya Kihlstedt played Ally.

Ally Alston (portrayed by Rya Kihlstedt as an adult, Amber Young as a child) is a cult leader investigated by Lois Lane who once affected Lucy Lane. She preaches something known as "The Inverse Method" and has managed to ensnare Lucy during a particularly vulnerable point in her life. Through the Inverse Method, Chrissy saw her other world counterpart as Superman prevents Bizarro from attacking Ally. Superman later learned from Bizarro that Ally took over his world and will do the same thing to Superman's world if she is not stopped. Ally was later approached by Mitch Anderson who gave her the pendant that was on Bizarro. After putting Anderson through the same procedure she did to Lucy, Ally gets the message from Anderson that her Bizarro counterpart wants her to come now. Superman prevented the departure of Ally, Chrissy, and another member where Ally ends up in DOD custody. Sam tries to get her to divulge any knowledge on where Lucy is. With help from Lucy, Erin Wu freed Ally and gave her the rebuilt armor that Bizarro wore upon his arrival. Superman aided the Bizarro versions of Lois, Jordan, and Sam against Ally, her Bizarro counterpart, and their allies. Ally manages to get a hold of the pendant and combines with her Bizarro counterpart while sending Jon-El to merge with Jonathan. After the pendant was confiscated, Ally appears to fight Superman and Tal-Rho even when John Henry Irons shows up. When Superman and Tal-Rho destroy the pendant, Ally grabs the pieces and flies off. Back in Bizarro World, Ally informs Lana-Rho about what happened. She then visits the cell of her Tal-Rho and drains him off his lifeforce. Afterwards, Ally broadcasts to all of Bizarro World that she is going to merge Earth and Bizarro World. Ally later appears before her remaining followers in Burnham Woods where she drains some energy out of Sam to draw Superman to her. When Superman arrives, she badly weakens him before retreating. As she plans to merge Earth and Bizarro World, Ally sends Lana-Rho to finish off Superman. Ally begins to merge Earth-Prime and Bizarro World and manages to defeat John Henry Irons when he tries to interfere. After Superman is recharged by the Sun with help from Tal-Rho, he defeats Ally Allston enough to split her back into two, has them restrained by John and Natalie, and prevents Bizarro World from merging with Earth. Ally and her Bizarro counterpart are shown to have been remanded to DOD custody as Lois briefly visits them.

- Kihlstedt also portrays the Bizarro version of Ally Alston.

==== Chuck Arden ====
Chuck Arden (portrayed by Toby Hargrave) is a resident of Smallville who Lana once sold a small business loan to which did not turn out to be legit. He brought up Lana's dealings in Smallville during one of her mayoral campaign activities.

In season four, Chuck is among the Smallville citizens who witness Doomsday throw Superman's defeated body to the Kent family. He later visits Mayor Lana. Lois learned from Landa that Chuck figured out the Kent family's connection with Superman as he lost his wife at some point. Chuck was later present in the bar when Aidy decided not to take up Lex Luthor's offer to sell her land and is among those that turned down Luthor's offer $10,000,000.00 offer. One year later following Lex's defeat, Chuck attended the wedding of Lana Lang and John Henry Irons.

==== Lucy Lane ====
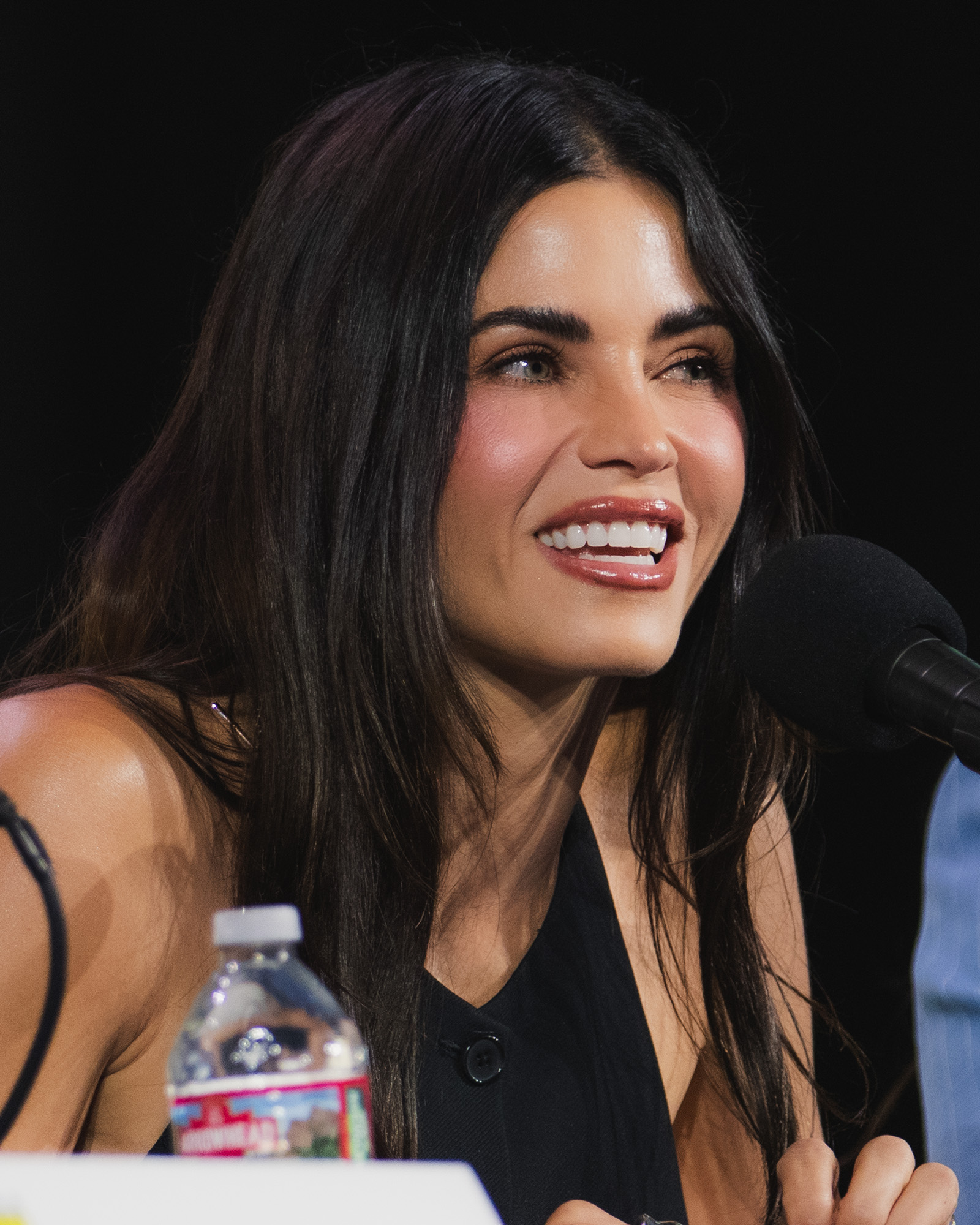
Jenna Dewan played Lucy.

Lucy Lane (portrayed by Jenna Dewan) is Lois Lane's younger sister who had fallen in with the "Inverse Method" cult five years ago. Lois and Sam had a hard time persuading her that Ally is dangerous. When Ally weakened Sam and Superman at Burnham Woods, Lucy saw that her family was right about Ally. Lucy stayed by her father's bed at the DOD's infirmary where he forgave her. After Ally was defeated, Lucy moved to Metropolis with her father taking her there.

In season three, Lucy Lane was called up by Lois who informs her of her diagnosis.

Dewan previously played a different version of Lucy in Supergirl.

=== Introduced in season three ===
==== Aleister Hook ====
Dr. Aleister Hook (portrayed by Shekhar Paleja) is an Intergang scientist who is among those working to revive and stabilize Atom Man. After Peia died and Bruno was defeated, Hook was murdered offscreen by Lex Luthor's right-hand man Otis who presents Dr. Hook's glasses to Lex.

==== Elias Orr ====
Elias Orr (portrayed by Christian Sloan) is an Intergang fixer who is loyal to Bruno Mannheim. When Peia starts losing control of her powers, Elias Orr is accidentally killed.

==== Matteo Mannheim ====
Matteo Mannheim (portrayed by Spence Moore II) is the son of Bruno and Peia Mannheim who Natalie meets at a party in Metropolis. During a dinner date with Natalie, where she met his parents, Matteo and Natalie were evacuated by Bruno's men when John Henry Irons showed up. After punching the guy escorting them away and witnessing John in his armor, Matteo later had an argument with his dad. After a secret visit to Natalie, Matteo questions his father's motives as Bruno shows Matteo the body of Bizarro. He states to Matteo that he plans to use what is in Bizarro to make a cure for Peia. Following Peia's death, Bruno and Matteo are detained by the D.O.D. Bruno agrees to cooperate with them if the charges against Matteo are dropped. This ended up occurring as Natalie later learns that Matteo is attending the D.O.D. Academy.

==== Peia Mannheim / Onomatopoeia ====
Peia Mannheim (portrayed by Daya Vaidya) is the cancer-afflicted wife of Bruno Mannheim and the mother of Matteo Mannheim. Peia uses a mask that allows her to manipulate all types of sounds. A flashback revealed that she used to work for Antony "Boss" Moxie until she turned on him and used her powers to kill Boss Moxie and those loyal to him. At the behest of her husband, Peia murdered John Henry Irons on July 7, 2015. She later told Bruno about an encounter with someone who looks like John sometime after killing George Dean. Lois later meets Peia at the Hob's Bay Medical Center and learns of her connection with Bruno. She and Bruno later met Natalie when she was on a dinner date with Matteo. When John shows up, Bruno has Matteo and Natalie evacuated as Peia goes on the attack. Peia collapses when her cancer spreads as Superman persuades Bruno to let him take Peia to the hospital. Peia was later placed in a special cell in the DOD to receive treatment for her cancer condition. The serum may have cured Peia's cancer and dramatically increased her powers, but it also seems to have made her powers that much harder to contain. She ends up releasing a scream that causes a city-wide blackout when she can no longer hold them in. A second dose of the serum makes it even worse, causing her to release a sonic blast that liquefies Elias Orr. Realizing Mannheim's cure will not work, she leaves him behind to avoid having him see her die or face the authorities who will be drawn to her; as he mourns her back in his hideout. When Superman arrives on the scene, he sees that her tumors have gotten even worse when he tries to help her. Peia's skin begins to glow with orange spots from the force of the vibrations she is holding in. It is to the point that his only choice is to talk her into allowing herself to die, rather than holding on and risking the lives of everyone in the city. The sheer force of her powers eventually kills her when she releases it in a massive burst after Superman takes her into the sky. Superman then leaves her corpse and forwards her final words to Bruno and Matteo.

=== Introduced in season four ===
==== Amanda McCoy ====
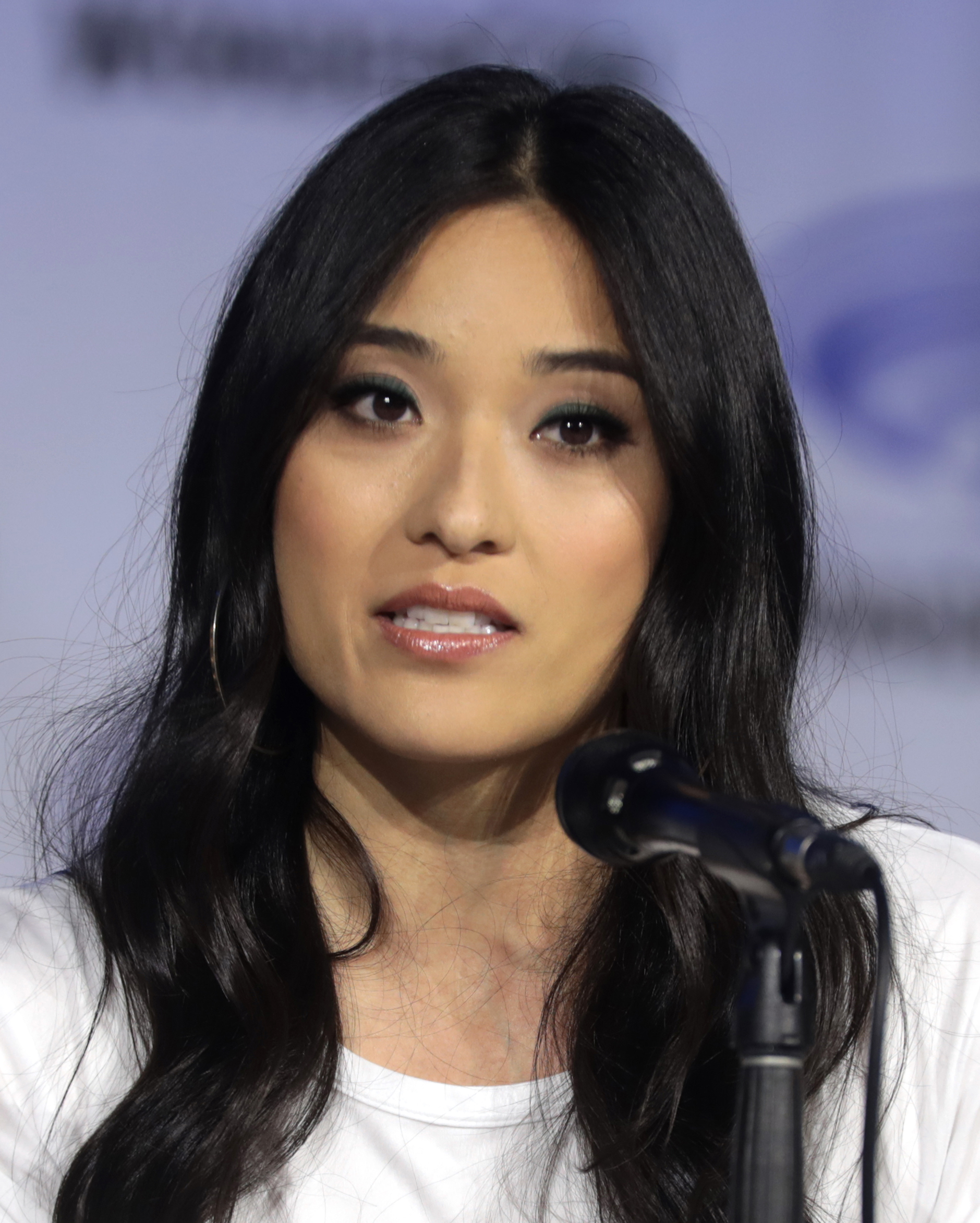
Yvonne Chapman played Amanda.

Amanda McCoy (portrayed by Yvonne Chapman) is the acting CEO of LuthorCorp and Lex Luthor's ally. After Lex was released from prison, Amanda met up with him and states that she has not found Elizabeth yet. She was present when Doomsday brought Lex the heart of Superman. Amanda and Lex later met with Sebastian Mallory about LuthorCorp's latest project which is briefly interrupted by a disguised Jordan. After fooling Jordan into thinking that he stepped on Superman's heart later that night, Amanda states that they can use the Manning farm as the site of their new base and that Sam Lane was responsible for Elizabeth's relocation. After an encounter with Elizabeth Luthor, Lex is informed by Amanda that Doomsday is not in his lair. Amanda was confronted by Lois Lane about Luthor's actions. Following Luthor's loss at the hands of Clark despite the Red Sun lights made by Milton, Amanda patches Luthor's face up and plans to get him a "killer suit". During Lois and Lex's interview with Gordon Godfrey, Amanda secretly calls Milton Fine to put the plan into operation when Lois starts to call up Elizabeth Luthor causing Milton to hack into John Henry Irons' armor and Natalie Irons' armor. Amanda later visits Lois to hand her a lawsuit from Lex Luthor for defamation and a bill for the window that Superman broke while implying that she will not find Cheryl Kimble. Lex later makes her a major shareholder of LuthorCorp. Outside of LuthorCorp, Amanda is told by Lois about what Lex does to his old associates. Visiting Lex in Smallville, she asks about his use of Cheryl Kimble and him possibly doing away with her. After Lex's armor shows up, he departs to confront Doomsday stating "We're done here". Amanda later visits Lois and states that she has been right about Lex. As Superman defeats Doomsday with help from John Henry Irons' hammer and flies him to the Sun, Amanda gets a call from Lex and she tells him that she is resigning from LuthorCorp. Before Lex can take her out, she is saved by Jonathan and Jordan. Lois persuades her to help with defeating Lex as Amanda tells them where they can find Milton.

== Guest characters ==
Introduced in season one

- Martha Kent (portrayed by Michele Scarabelli) – The adoptive mother of Clark Kent. She later dies of a stroke in the pilot. A bench was later dedicated in memory of her. In season four, Martha was seen in a flashback to Clark and Lois' wedding where Sam overheard a positive conversation between them that causes Sam to walk Lois down the aisle.
- Jonathan Kent (portrayed by Fred Henderson) – The adoptive father of Clark Kent. He died of a heart attack while Clark was a teenager.
- Perry White (portrayed by Paul Jarrett) – The editor-in-chief of the Daily Planet before Morgan Edge bought it out.
- Pastor Lindquist (portrayed by Charles Singh) – A pastor who precided over Clark and Lois' wedding.
- Samuel Foswell (portrayed by Dean Marshall) – A minion of Morgan Edge who runs the Daily Planet after it was bought by Edge.
- Dr. Frye (portrayed by Chy Liu) – Martha Kent's doctor who informs Clark about Martha having a stroke.
- Eliza (portrayed by Coral Humphrey in season 1 and Yasmeene Ball in season 3) – Jonathan's girlfriend who he speaks to through a video chat ever since the Kent family relocated to Smallville. She eventually broke up with him.
- David Fuglestad (portrayed by Daniel Cudmore) – A man with super-strength that rivals Superman's super-strength due to having been experimented on with X-Kryptonite by Morgan Edge and Dabney Donovan. After being defeated by Superman, David was later killed by Leslie Larr on Morgan Edge's orders after he called him up while driving. She later calls up Edge to inform him that her job is done and that she will "send a team".
- Sharon Powell (portrayed by Jill Teed) – A woman whose son was offered a job by Morgan Edge and later gets targeted by David Fuglestad.
- Derek Powell (portrayed by Clayton James) – A miner and Sharon's son who took a job by Morgan Edge. After being killed in an accident, Powell is revived by Morgan and Leslie using X-Kryptonite, which gives him Kryptonian abilities. During a fight with Superman, Powell commits suicide using his heat vision.
- Tom Mitchel (portrayed by Rohain Arora) – A firefighter who works for the Smallville Fire Department.
- Thaddeus Killgrave (portrayed by Brendan Fletcher) – A mad scientist and old enemy of Superman who works with Intergang.
- Dabney Donovan (portrayed by Robel Zere) – A scientist and associate of Morgan Edge who assisted in his experiment with X-Kryptonite and the Eradicator.
- Robbie Alvarez (portrayed by Stephen Adekolu) – A firefighter who works for the Smallville Fire Department.
- Tegan Wickhem (portrayed by Kayla Heller) – A student at Smallville High School who becomes Jonathan's love interest. She and her mother moved to Smallville from Central City after her father was arrested and incarcerated.
- Dr. Wiles (portrayed by Wendy Crewson) – A Department of Defense (DOD) therapist whom Lois sees.
- Jason Trask (portrayed by Spencer Lang) – A lieutenant in the DOD who was supposed to torture John Henry Irons before being killed by Lt. Rosetti.
- Avery Phan (portrayed by Kenendy Chew) – The daughter of Emily and Duc Phan.
- Ms. Sharp (portrayed by Marika Siewert) – A music teacher at Smallville High School.
- Jasper Townes (portrayed by Shawn Stewart) – A man who undergoes Morgan Edge's X-Kryptonite experiments.
- Ron Troupe (portrayed by Charles Jarman) – A reporter from the Daily Planet during Clark's early days.
- Janet Olsen (portrayed by Yoshi Bancroft) – A reporter at the Daily Planet during Clark's early days and the sister of Jimmy Olsen who is loosely based on Janie Olsen. She would later work as a camera operator at GBS.
  - Yoshi Bancroft also portrays Janet's Bizarro counterpart.
- Henry Miller / Atom Man (portrayed by Paul Lazenby) – A Neo-Nazi arsonist whom Clark fought in his early days. John Henry Irons kills Atom Man in self-defense, to the dismay of Superman and Sam Lane.
- Dr. Patel (portrayed by Yasmin Abidi) – The doctor who delivered Clark and Lois' sons.
- Zeta-Rho (portrayed by A. C. Peterson) – The father of Tal-Rho and ex-husband of Lara Lor-Van. Like Jor-El, a copy of his consciousness is encoded virtually as an A.I. within Tal-Rho's desert hideout in hologram form.
- John Diggle (portrayed by David Ramsay) – An A.R.G.U.S. operative from Star City. Ramsay previously portrayed a different version of Diggle in the Arrowverse.
- Kya Johnson (portrayed by Jennifer Kho) – A deputy at the Smallville Police Department.

Introduced in season two

- Daniel Hart (portrayed by Nathan Witte) – A man who runs against Mayor George Dean in the mayoral election, with Lana Lang as his campaign manager. He drops out of the election when he gets offered a job in another town.
- Jessie Vance (portrayed by Evelyn Gonda) – A teenage girl who is a member of the Supermen of America. She and her teammate were killed by Bizarro.
- Dr. Kit Faulkner (portrayed by Catherine Lough Haggquist) – A geologist working for AmerTek Industries who oversees the mining operation at the Shuster Mine in Smallville. Faulkner is later revealed to have connections with Ally Allston and is killed by Bizarro.
- Phillip Karnowski (portrayed by Shaw Madson) – An arms dealer and drug dealer who manages to obtain X-Kryptonite. Karnowski was defeated by the Supermen of America.
- Tonya Martinez (portrayed by Cynthia Mendez) – A bartender at a Smallville bar called Monito's who Kyle once had an affair with. When Kyle took Sarah to Monito's for open mic night, it was mentioned by Kyle that Tonya no longer works there. Though she was able to carry a favor from Kyle to the bar's manager.
- Erin Wu (portrayed by Stephanie Cho) – A U.S. Army member with the rank of First sergeant who works under Mitch Anderson. She later helps to free Ally Allston from DOD custody and give her the rebuilt armor that Bizarro wore upon his arrival on Earth.
- John Pugh (portrayed by Jim Thorburn) – An attorney that was associated with Ally Allston's family.
- David (portrayed by Matthew Graham) – The uncle of Ally Allston who tried to persuade her not to go down the same path as her father did.
- Maryann Cushing (portrayed by Carmen Aguirre) – The mother of Kyle and the grandmother of Sarah and Sophie who attends Sarah's quinceañera.
- General Hardcastle (portrayed by Patricia Drake) – The superior of Mitch Anderson who reprimands him for the DOD's poor relationship with Superman under his watch.
- Sandra Vance (portrayed by Laura Drummond) – The mother of Jessie Vance who attended her funeral. She scolded Mitch Anderson for sending her daughter to her death.
- Aubrey (portrayed by Djouliet Amara) – A girl from Clover that Sarah met at camp and had a brief kiss with her. She later came from upon being called by Sarah to talk about what is going on with her parents. As the daughter of divorced parents, Aubrey advised Sarah to talk to her father. Before heading back to Clover, Aubrey and Sarah agreed to remain friends.
- Balcomb (portrayed by Lossen Chambers) – The principal of Smallville High School.
- Mickey Jeroux (portrayed by Kenny Wood-Schatz) – A townie who is a rival X-Kryptonite dealer of Candice.
- Rahim Olowe (portrayed by Broadus Mattison) – The father of Denise and proprietor of Brit & Dunn's.
- Barb Dodge (portrayed by Nancy Kerr) – A citizen of Smallville. She blamed Jonathan for getting football at Smallville High School cancelled until Lana gets her to back off.
- Beau Besser (portrayed by Hilda Martin)
- Meghan (portrayed by Madeleine Kelders) – A follower of Ally Allston who leaves her group upon getting tired of waiting for Ally Allston to return from Bizarro World.

Introduced in season three

- Dr. Darlene Irons (portrayed by Angel Parker) – A physician in Metropolis who is the sister of this Earth's John Henry Irons. She tells Lois about her brother selling weapons to Bruno Mannheim and later has Lois come in for some additional tests. Darlene would later meet her brother's counterpart and mention what she knows about her John. To see if John was as smart as his counterpart, Bruno Mannheim had Darlene strapped to a bomb of John's making in a van. John was able to disarm the bomb.
- Tara Reagan (portrayed by Karen Holness) – A judge who was pressured by Intergang into having Atom-Man released. As the judge responsible for the sentencing of Lex Luthor, she was later killed offscreen on Luthor's orders.
- Travis Michaels (portrayed by Zachary Loewen) – A teenager at Metropolis High School.
- Emmitt Pergande (portrayed by Adrian Lynn McMorran) – The father of Candice Pergande who causes problems for Jonathan. After hearing of Lois's encounter with Emmitt and him punching Johnathan, Clark confronted him at the diner Victoria May's and intimidated him into leaving his family alone. Clark would later learn from his super-hearing that Emmitt has left town, abandoning Candice. In season four, Emmitt returned to Smallville where he mentioned living out of his car and revealed he discovered Clark was Superman from "a little birdy". When Emmitt fires his gun at Clark to prove his point, Clark became Superman where the bullet dented on his chest. Kyle then proceeded to take Emmitt to Deputy Kya Johnson. Lois later found out that Emmitt served time in Stryker's Penitentiary around the time when Lex Luthor was incarcerated there.
- Mike Gunn (portrayed by Arpad Balogh) – A member of Intergang who oversaw the clearing out of one of the abandoned buildings that Lois and Chrissy snuck into. Gunn is later shown to wield Kryptonite hand cannons.
- George Dean Jr. (portrayed by Dylan Leonard) – The son of George Dean.
- James DiStefano / Deadline (portrayed by Jason Beaudoin) – An ex-con with terminal lymphoma who Bruno Mannheim arranged to be freed and has gone through the same procedure as Atom-Man. Equipped with a special phasing suit, James became Deadline and raided a DOD headquarters to get to its console. Despite his suit being damaged by Superman enough to trap in a wall, the device he used uploaded information to Intergang on their DOD headquarters before he dies.
- Antony "Boss" Moxie (portrayed by Artine Tony Brown) – The founder and previous leader of Intergang who Bruno worked for. While it was said that he was killed by Lex Luthor, what really happened is that Bruno turned on him when Moxie declined his proposition leading to Peia killing Moxie and those loyal to him before Moxie can have Bruno killed.
- Kerry Wexler (portrayed by Christine Willes) – The governor of Kansas.
- Otis Grisham (portrayed by Ryan Booth) – An inmate at Stryker's Prison. When Lex Luthor was sentenced to Stryker's Prison, Lex tries to borrow the razor that Otis was using on an inmate only to get beaten up by Otis and his fellow inmates. Otis was later dispatched by Lex to take out Lana Lang. After bypassing her security system and getting her into a stranglehold, Otis was knocked out by Sarah. He was loaded onto an ambulance bound for the DOD. Clark later mentioned to Lois that John has not gotten him to crack yet. John would later mention to Lois and Clark that Otis was found dead in his cell before he can meet with a prosecutor. Though it was thought that Otis hung himself, John suspects fowl play was involved.
- William Ellis (portrayed by Dean Redman) – The prison warden of Stryker's Prison. To get control of the inmates, Lex Luthor used his outside contacts to blackmail Warden Ellis by threatening his family. Warden Ellis complied with Lex's demands and arranged for Otis Grisham and those that beat up Lex Luthor to be beaten up. He also procured Lex a razor so that he can shave his head. Following Peia Mannheim's death and her frame-up of Lex being exposed, Warden Ellis saw Lex off when he was released and delayed the news of it to the press. One year later following Lex's defeat, William Ellis welcome's Lex back to Stryker's after he was sent there with a life sentence. When Lex notes that he was not in his cell as his lawyers wanted to have arranged, Ellis states that things have changed and opens the cell Lex was originally incarcerated in as Bruno emerges as the now dominant prisoner.
- Hacksaw Kronick (portrayed by Petar Gatsby) – A henchman of Lex Luthor who assists in his experiments on Bizarro. In season four, Hacksaw Kronic uses X-Kryptonite Flamethrower Gauntlets when targeting Cheryl Kimble. Though Jonathan saved Cheryl, Superman defeated Hacksaw and had John Henry Irons remand him to DOD custody as Lois plans to get information on where Lex Luthor is hiding.
- "Gretchen Kelley" / Cheryl Kimble (portrayed by Rebecca Staab) – An older woman who dates Sam Lane. What he did not know until too late that she is actually working for Lex Luthor as she tases him as part of Otis Grisham's plan to abduct Sam.
- Jimmy Chan (portrayed by River Song) – A student at Smallville High School who Coach Gaines gives the credit for the hard work setting up for the meteor shower viewing event to. In season four, Jimmy becomes Coach Gaines' assistant at his DJ work.

Introduced in season four

- Sebastien Mallory (portrayed by Jason Cermack) – A LuthorCorp worker who meets with Lex Luthor and Amanda McCoy to talk about LuthorCorp's latest project. He was later present when Lois Lane confronted Amanda McCoy about her knowledge of Lex Luthor's options. Sebastien later visits Lex in light of a meeting with the board of directors and leaves when Superman arrives. When Lois confronts Amanda outside of LuthorCorp, Sebastien is sent up to the board meeting without her.
- Big Sugar (portrayed by Steve Ell) – A chef at the diner Victoria May's.
- Jonell Jones (portrayed by Warren Abbott) – A member of the DOD's Squad K who was blackmailed by Lex Luthor into getting the information on Elizabeth Luthor's location out of Sam Lane when Luthor threatened his family. The confrontation went south when Jones accidentally shot Sam in the abdomen, causing Luthor to send Doomsday to finish the job. Jones was later mentioned to have gone AWOL afterwards.
- Mrs. Beppo (portrayed by Laara Sadiq) – The mother of Chrissy Beppo.
- Erica Luthor (portrayed by Natalie Moon) – The estranged ex-wife of Lex Luthor and the mother of Elizabeth Luthor.
- Elizabeth Luthor (portrayed by Elizabeth Henstridge as an adult, Ella Wejr as a 14-year-old) is the estranged daughter of Lex Luthor and Erica Luthor. Following her father's arrest, Elizabeth moved with her mother to England, where she became a doctor. After Luthor's release, she was relocated by Sam Lane. She currently resides in France and started a family, being five months pregnant with a son. When persuaded by Lois to reason with her father, Elizabeth reveals her pregnancy and tries to persuade Luthor to give up his vendetta in exchange for the chance to start over with his family, to no avail. She orders him not to see her again as she will not have her unborn child be caught up in his hatred. Later when being interviewed by Gordon Godfrey, Lois tries to call Elizabeth to tell her story, but it gets ruined when Superman fights John Henry Irons' armor, which got hacked by Milton Fine.
- Lionel Luthor (portrayed by Colin Decker) – The father of Lex Luthor and the grandfather of Elizabeth Luthor who left his family.
- Lillian Luthor (portrayed by Nesta Chapman) – The mother of Lex Luthor and the grandmother of Elizabeth Luthor who abused her son after her husband left them.
- Jimmy Olsen (portrayed by Douglas Smith) – A photojournalist at the Daily Planet and the brother of Janet Olsen. In flashbacks, Jimmy recruited Clark into joining the Daily Planet's baseball team. He had his suspicions of Clark being Superman which explained the reason why Clark showed up late to each game. In the present sometime after Clark revealed to Janet in his interview with her that he is Superman, Janet has Jimmy pay a visit to Clark as they catch up at Victoria May's.
- Linda Ryan (portrayed by Patricia Cullen) – The mother of Timmy Ryan. When Lois and Clark visit her after Kyle had to defuse his ranting to Jonathan and Jordan about them being Superman's kids, Linda tried to pacify Ryan. She was later seen with Timmy when they watch Janet Olsen's interview with Clark Kent as he reveals that he is Superman.
- Gordon Godfrey (portrayed by Tom Cavanagh) – The host of the interview program "GODFREY".
- Milton Fine (portrayed by Nikolai Witschl) – A computer genius and inventor working at LuthorCorp.
- Dr. Ko (portrayed by Benita Ha) – A doctor who informs Lois Lane that she is cancer free and gives her the card of a doctor to do a follow-up surgery on.
- Vicky May (portrayed by Stacee Copeland) – The proprietor of the diner Victoria May's. In light of Clark Kent revealing that he is Superman, Vicky later redoes the diner to include Superman-based items. During Doomsday's rampage on Smallville, Jordan helps her through a panic attack.
- Krypto – A Golden Retriever that Clark adopts.

== See also ==
- List of DC Comics characters
- List of Arrowverse actors
