= Alex Garfin =

American actor

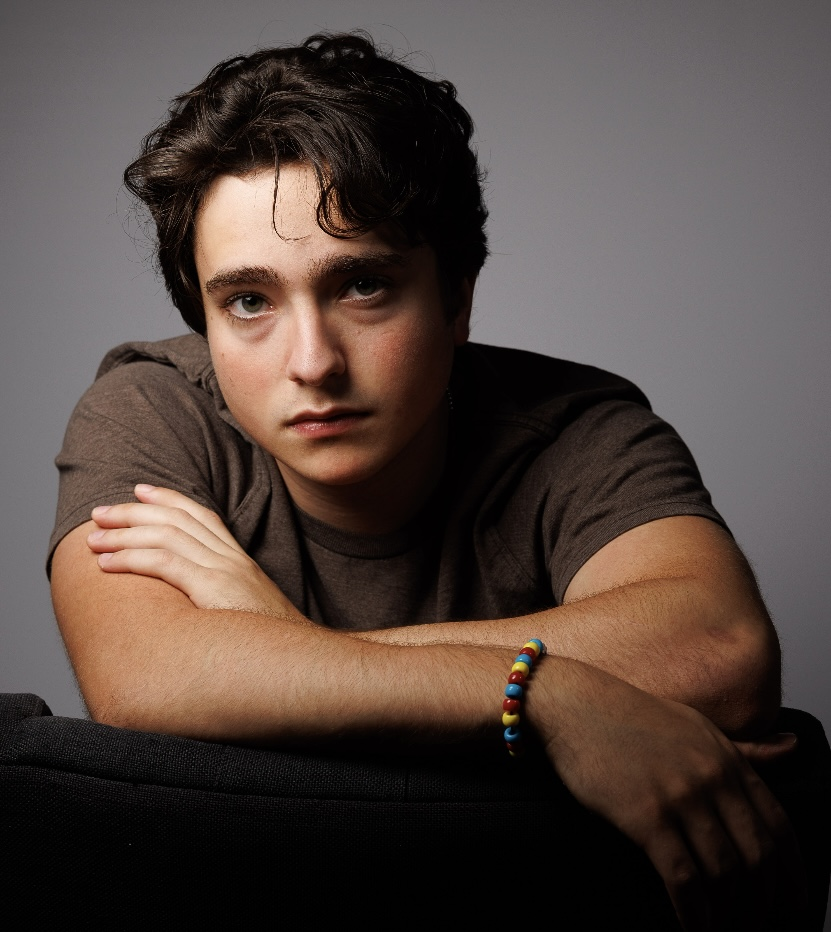
- Alex Garfin (2024)
- Born: September 23, 2003 (age 23); New York City, U.S.
- Occupations: Actor; musician; activist
- Years active: 2010–present
- Known for: The Peanuts Movie; Superman & Lois

Alexander Garfin (born September 23, 2003) is an American actor, musician, and activist. He voiced the character Linus in the 2015 animated comedy film The Peanuts Movie, and for his performance he received a 43rd Annie Awards nomination for Outstanding Achievement for Voice Acting in a Feature Production, and won the 2016 Young Entertainer Award - Best Young Ensemble Cast - Voice Over. In 2021, Garfin landed his breakthrough role as Jordan Kent, a son of Superman and Lois Lane, in the superhero drama television series Superman & Lois until 2024; for his performance, he was nominated for a Saturn Award for Best Performance by a Younger Actor in a Television Series in 2022.

Garfin serves as the Head of Youth and Board Secretary of the UN ECOSOC NGO World Information Transfer at UN Headquarters.

== Early life ==
Garfin was born on September 23, 2003, and raised in Manhattan, in New York City, to Jeffrey Garfin and Karin Carnaroli Garfin. He has a brother, Max Garfin, who is also an actor. His father is Jewish and his mother is Italian.

Garfin attended Fiorello H. LaGuardia High School of Music & Art and Performing Arts in Manhattan in New York City. He graduated in 2021.

== Career ==
=== Early years ===
Garfin began his acting career at 3 years old by appearing in a string of Nickelodeon videos. In 2010, at five years old he played an uncredited role as the "Youngest Chenkov" in the action film Salt, starring Angelina Jolie. For the part, he had his hair and eyebrows dyed blonde. In 2011 he acted in the police procedural crime drama television series Law & Order: Special Victims Unit; he has appeared in two episodes of the show.

He voiced the character Linus in the 2015 animated comedy film The Peanuts Movie, a big screen adaptation of the comic strip Peanuts. For his performance, in 2015 Garfin received a 43rd Annie Awards nomination for Outstanding Achievement for Voice Acting in a Feature Production. Garfin won the 2016 Young Entertainer Award - Best Young Ensemble Cast - Voice Over, with the cast of the Peanuts movie.

Garfin has worked in the animated television series Whisker Haven Tales with the Palace Pets.

Garfin acted in his Off-Broadway debut in the play Fear at the Lucille Lortel Theatre in 2019, alongside Enrico Colantoni and directed by Tea Alagic, playing the role of the captive boy Jamie. Writing for The New York Times, journalist Elisabeth Vincentelli described Garfin as "quite convincing as a hard-to-parse teenager trying to talk his way into escape."

=== 2020–present ===
Garfin appeared in New Amsterdam.

In November 2022, Garfin performed in his first solo singing gig in Vancouver, Canada. He has written over 110 original songs, and plays guitar and piano.

Garfin played Jordan Kent, a son of Superman and Lois Lane, for four seasons in the superhero drama television series Superman & Lois that premiered in February 2021. He worked with a fight trainer for a year and a half so that he could himself act in a fight scene, rather than have a double do the acting. For the first two seasons he played the role of being a twin son along with Jordan Elsass, who played the character Jonathan Kent and was later replaced by Michael Bishop. Garfin spent much of his time filming the show in Vancouver, Canada. In 2022, Garfin was nominated for a 50th Anniversary Saturn Award for Best Performance by a Younger Actor in a Television Series. A fourth season of the series was announced in June 2023. The fourth season finale, in which Garfin finally received his own superhero suit, aired in December 2024.

Garfin is set to star in Richard L. Anderson's directorial debut swampy creature feature horror film Wekiwa.

== Activism ==
Garfin has engaged in activism and works closely with the United Nations, particularly focusing on climate change, sustainability, human rights, mental health and youth issues. He serves as Head of Youth and Board Secretary of the UN ECOSOC NGO World Information Transfer at UN Headquarters, leading a team of young people focused on global engagement and impact. He also serves as a Youth Ambassador for Sing for Hope, an organization utilizing the arts and music to build community.

In November 2022, Garfin served as one of the youth representatives and speakers to attend the COP27 in Sharm El Sheikh, Egypt.

Garfin co-founded, WeTheFuture, alongside his friend, Kunal Sood, to improve communication and bridge the gap between Generation Z and older generations, focusing heavily on critical global issues like climate change.

Garfin also founded a nonprofit organization, The Alethos Initiative. It equips digital creators and influencers with journalism training and direct access to experts to help stop the spread of online misinformation.

== Personal life ==
Garfin plays piano, guitar and ukulele. He writes original songs and shares them on his TikTok and Instagram. He also plays and shares cover songs.

Garfin can speak Japanese.

Garfin is currently an undergraduate at Columbia University studying philosophy and economics.

== Filmography ==
=== Film ===
Year	Title	Role	Notes	Refs
2010	Salt	Youngest Chenkov	Uncredited	
2015	The Peanuts Movie	Linus (voice)	Received a 43rd Annie Awards nomination for Outstanding Achievement for Voice Acting in a Feature Production; won the 2016 Young Entertainer Award - Best Young Ensemble Cast - Voice Over.	
TBA	Wekiwa †	Patrick	Filming	

=== Television ===
Year	Title	Role	Notes	Refs
2009, 2011	Law & Order: Special Victims Unit	Luke Thomas, Anthony Maxwell	Episodes: "Stranger" and "Double Strands"	
2016–17	Whisker Haven Tales with the Palace Pets	Stripes (voice)	3 episodes	
2020	New Amsterdam	Elio	Episode: "Liftoff"	
2021–24	Superman & Lois	Jordan Kent	Main cast; 53 episodes; received a 2022 nomination for a 50th Anniversary Saturn Award for Best Performance by a Younger Actor in a Television Series	

== Theatre ==
Year	Title	Role	Venue	Refs
2013	On Borrowed Time		Two River Theater, Red Bank, New Jersey	
2019	Fear	Jamie	Lucille Lortel Theatre, Off-Broadway, New York City	

== Awards and nominations ==
Year	Award	Category	Work	Result	Ref.
2015	43rd Annie Awards	Outstanding Achievement for Voice Acting in a Feature Production	The Peanuts Movie	Nominated	
2016	Young Entertainer Award	Best Young Ensemble Cast - Voice Over	The Peanuts Movie	Won	
2022	50th Anniversary Saturn Award	Best Performance by a Younger Actor in a Television Series	Superman & Lois	Nominated	
