= Sam Lane (character) =

Fictional character

- Sam Lane as seen in Superman: Secret Origin #5. Art by Gary Frank.

Publication information
- Publisher: DC Comics
- First appearance: Superman's Girl Friend, Lois Lane #13 (November 1959)
- Created by: Robert Bernstein; Kurt Schaffenberger

In-story information
- Full name: Samuel Lane
- Species: Human
- Team affiliations: United States Army; United States Senate

Sam Lane is a fictional character appearing in American comic books published by DC Comics. He is the father of Lucy Lane and Lois Lane and the father-in-law of Clark Kent / Superman.

Denis Arndt and Harve Presnell portrayed the character in the series Lois & Clark: The New Adventures of Superman, Michael Ironside in Smallville, Glenn Morshower in Supergirl, and Dylan Walsh in Superman & Lois; and Joel de la Fuente voiced him in the animated series My Adventures with Superman.

== Publication history ==
Sam Lane, along with his wife Ella was introduced in Superman's Girl Friend, Lois Lane #13 (November 1959) as a horse farmer in the town of Pittsdale. He was created by Robert Bernstein and Kurt Schaffenberger.

== Fictional character biography ==
=== Post-Crisis ===
Following Crisis on Infinite Earths, Sam was reimagined as a hard-bitten and outspoken US Army General, with an awkward relationship with his daughters. It was explained that Lane had wanted his eldest child to be a boy, so had treated Lois as a surrogate son, when he was present at all. This version first appeared in The Adventures of Superman #424 (January 1987), the first retitled issue of the former Superman title. He became a more significant character following Lois' engagement to Clark Kent, being highly unimpressed with the mild-mannered reporter despite his obvious commitment to Lois.

When Lex Luthor becomes President of the United States, he appoints Sam Lane as Secretary of Defense. This leads to Lois, as an investigative journalist trying to prove Luthor is corrupt, opposing her father, especially during the buildup to the Imperiex War.

During the fight against Imperiex, Lane is apparently killed after detonating the nuclear engine of his tank to crack the shell of an Imperiex probe and allow Black Lightning to attack it. Lucy decides to try and honor her father's memory and give him the soldier he was denied by joining the U.S. Army. Lucy is wounded during the Amazons' attack on Washington, D.C., and is secretly rescued and brought to a secret facility. Sam Lane reveals himself to have survived and become the leader of the covert operation Project 7734. Lucy volunteers to become Superwoman and is given a mystically-powered costume that allowed her to pass as a Kryptonian. Lucy is to infiltrate Kandor and gathering intelligence on the Kryptonians and New Krypton. Lucy appears to die battling Supergirl when her suit is ruptured, but returns to life with Kryptonian powers.

Lane drafts the imprisoned Lex Luthor into a secret operation against Superman and the Kryptonians of Kandor. The U.S. government believes the aliens to be a risk for world's security and begins to create countermeasures against them. When General Zod declares war on Earth after it is revealed Lex Luthor aided Brainiac in attacking New Krypton, Lane puts his plans into action. The Luthor robot tampers with Reactron's body chemistry, causing him to explode. The resulting chain reaction destroys New Krypton and kills most of the remaining 100,000 Kryptonians, including Supergirl's mother Alura.

Under Lane's orders, Luthor transforms the Earth's sun from yellow to red to rob the Kryptonians of their powers. Flamebird neutralizes this countermeasure and the sun reverts to yellow and restores everyone's power. At the same time, Jimmy Olsen and his associates save Natasha Irons and transmit Lane's activities to the Internet. The remaining Kryptonians, led by Ursa and Zod himself, begin attacking Earth. When confronted by Supergirl and Lois, Lane commits suicide rather than be made accountable to an international court.

=== The New 52 ===
In September 2011, The New 52 rebooted DC's continuity. In this new timeline, Sam Lane is re-introduced in the relaunched Action Comics where he is seen attempting to catch Superman, believing him to be a menace. Lane later has Kryptonite Man released from custody, believing he is necessary to help keep Superman in check. Kryptonite Man agrees under the condition that Lane helps him locate his wife. Following the death of US Senator Hume, Sam is chosen as his replacement and becomes a member of the United States Senate.

=== DC Rebirth ===
In 2016, DC Comics implemented a relaunch of its books called "DC Rebirth", which restored its continuity to a form much as it was prior to The New 52. Sam Lane appears as the official U.S. military representative when a nationwide crisis arises. Along with Mister Bones, Steve Trevor, Amanda Waller, and Father Time, he attempts to stop the threat with technological means. This fails when a mystically powered alternate universe version of Bruce Wayne attacks and brainwashes the entire group.

In Event Leviathan (2019), Sam Lane is hospitalized after being injured in an attack by Leviathan. In the hospital, Lane is attacked by an agent who believes him to be a member of Leviathan. Zatanna rescues Lane and teleports him away, but he dies soon after without life support.

== Other versions ==
=== All-Star Superman ===
An alternate universe version of Sam Lane appears in All-Star Superman #1. This version temporarily pulled Lex Luthor from prison to work for the U.S. government.

=== Flashpoint ===
An alternate timeline version of Sam Lane appears in Flashpoint. This version was in charge of Project: Superman, which involved capturing and studying Kal-El. He attempted to bond with him before Sam pulls an escaped prisoner named Neil Sinclair into the Phantom Zone. The pair later emerge on a deserted island, where Sinclair murders Sam.

=== Earth 2 ===
An alternate universe version of Sam Lane from Earth 2 appears in the alternate Earth's self-titled series. This version is a member of the World Army who works with Robotman to create Red Tornado before he is killed in a cave-in.

== In other media ==
=== Television ===
- Sam Lane appears in Lois and Clark: The New Adventures of Superman, initially portrayed by Denis Arndt and later by Harve Presnell. This version is a cyberneticist who is divorced from his wife Ellen and has an estranged relationship with his daughter Lois Lane, though he attempts to improve both relationships in later episodes.
- Sam Lane appears in the Superman: The Animated Series episode "Monkey Fun", voiced by Dean Jones. This version is involved in the United States space program and originally owned Titano.
- Sam Lane appears in Smallville, portrayed by Michael Ironside. After his wife died, this version struggled to raise his estranged daughters, Lois and Lucy, having modeled his parenting style on his army career and implemented a chain of command that saw him taking charge of Lois, who in turn took charge of Lucy. In the tenth season, Sam is promoted to a four-star general and becomes involved in the Vigilante Registration Act.
- Sam Lane appears in the first season of Supergirl, portrayed by Glenn Morshower. This version possesses anti-alien views. In pursuit of his goal of exterminating all aliens, he attempts to take over the Department of Extranormal Operations (DEO) for their resources and approves the creation of the unstable Red Tornado until he is saved by Supergirl several times and assists her in stopping her uncle Non from taking over National City. Following this, Sam and the U.S. military take Non's device, the Omegahedron, into their custody and deliver it to Maxwell Lord.
- Sam Lane appears in Superman & Lois, portrayed by Dylan Walsh. This version is a member of the Department of Defense (DOD) who is aware of Clark Kent's identity as Superman and often works with him despite their stiff and impersonal relationship. Throughout the first season, Sam works with Superman to stop Tal-Rho before retiring from active duty. In the second season, Sam assists Superman when he starts having visions due to an "invasive cosmological event", attempts to help his daughters Lois and Lucy Lane reconnect, and secretly trains Superman's son Jordan Kent in better utilizing his powers. In the third season, Sam returns to the DOD and gives Jordan a suit and his father's goggles to protect his identity. In the fourth season, Sam sacrifices himself to save Superman after the latter was killed by Doomsday.
  - Additionally, Sam's Bizarro World counterpart appears in the second season episode "Bizarros in a Bizarro World", also portrayed by Walsh. This version is the head of his version of the DOD until Ally Allston's Bizarro counterpart takes over, leading Bizarro Sam to join a resistance movement against her.
- Sam Lane appears in My Adventures with Superman, voiced by Joel de la Fuente. This version is a Korean-American founding member and co-leader of Task Force X alongside Amanda Waller. Twenty-two years prior, he and Waller survived "Zero Day", during which a Kryptonian invasion force led by an armored warrior they dubbed "Nemesis Omega" killed their military comrades. Following this, they repurposed leftover Kryptonian technology and founded Task Force X to prevent threats of similar magnitude. However, his unwillingness to endanger civilians puts him at odds with Waller. Throughout the first season, he initially leads a manhunt against Superman, who he believes to be "Nemesis Omega". However, after capturing and interrogating him, and while standing next to his daughter Lois, Lane begins to doubt Superman's involvement with "Zero Day", for which Waller demotes him on Checkmate and the U.S. government's behalf. During the second season, Sam goes into hiding to protect his loved ones before eventually resurfacing to help Superman thwart Brainiac's invasion of Metropolis. In season 3, Sam has retired and is now working for The Pentagon.

=== Film ===
- Sam Lane appears in Superman, portrayed by Kirk Alyn.
- Sam Lane appears in All-Star Superman, voiced by an uncredited Steve Blum.
- The Flashpoint incarnation of Sam Lane appears in Justice League: The Flashpoint Paradox, voiced by Danny Huston.
- Sam Lane appears in Justice League: Throne of Atlantis, voiced by Jay K. Johnson.
- Sam Lane appears in Lego DC Comics Super Heroes: Justice League – Attack of the Legion of Doom, voiced by James Arnold Taylor. This version is xenophobic towards extraterrestrial life.
- Sam Lane appears in Batman Unlimited: Mechs vs. Mutants, voiced by John DiMaggio.

=== Miscellaneous ===
An alternate universe version of Sam Lane appears in the Justice League: Gods and Monsters prequel comic. This version was a war physician who died amidst a battle that Superman was involved in.

== Reception ==
Chad Derdowski of Mania.com felt that Sam Lane would have been a formidable villain to use for a Zack Snyder Superman film, stating that "Lane would provide a little more dramatic oomph for the film, driving a wedge between the relationship of Clark Kent and Lois Lane and turning the whole thing into a family affair."
