= Last Son =

Comic book story arc

- Cover of Action Comics #844 (Dec 2006), art by Adam Kubert.
- Publisher: DC Comics
- Publication date: December 2006 – July 2008
- Genre: Superhero
- Title(s): Action Comics #844–846, 851; Action Comics Annual #11
- Main character(s): Superman; Chris Kent; Lois Lane; General Zod; Non; Ursa; Lex Luthor; Bizarro; Mon-El

Creative team
- Writer(s): Geoff Johns; Richard Donner
- Artist: Adam Kubert

"Last Son" is a five-issue comic book story arc featuring Superman in the monthly Action Comics. It was written by Geoff Johns and Richard Donner, the director of the well-known 1978 film Superman: The Movie and a portion of Superman II, with pencils by Adam Kubert. This story introduces the original character, Christopher Kent and adapts the classic Superman film villains, General Zod (his appearance modeled after the actor, Terence Stamp), Ursa and Non into the regular DC Universe continuity.

The arc's first three parts were published in Action Comics #844 through #846. The next parts were delayed to give Kubert sufficient recovery time from health problems he did not wish to disclose. Because of this, the fourth part was delayed and released with issue #851. The eleventh annual of Action Comics, released in May 2008, completed the storyline. The hardcover edition of the complete series was released on July 2 the same year.

== Plot ==
Reminded by the Fortress of Solitude's AI (in the guise of his Kryptonian father Jor-El) that, despite his appearance, he is not human, Superman heads back to the Daily Planet when people panic as a strange meteor is about to crash. He stops it, and sees that it is a pod ship carrying a little boy. Sarge Steel of the Department of Metahuman Affairs meets with Superman about the boy, whom he learns is Kryptonian. Superman takes a personal interest in the child, and is concerned over what the government might do to him. His concerns are proved justified when the boy is transferred without Superman's knowledge. Enraged, Superman disguises himself to grab the boy from a moving van and goes to the Kent Farm in Smallville, Kansas.

With no answers on the boy from the Fortress, Clark talks to Lois about adopting him, but she feels uncomfortable given who and what they are. The boy then speaks English as news breaks out on the young Kryptonian's disappearance. Lex Luthor hears the news and wants Bizarro to grab him. At a press conference, where Superman announces that Clark Kent and Lois Lane will take care of the Kryptonian child, Bizarro arrives and attacks him. The fight threatens the city around the conference location, and Superman finally uses super-breath to throw him away. Lois and Clark walk with their adopted child, named Chris Kent, as three more pods land near the Fortress carrying Phantom Zone criminals General Zod, Ursa and Non.

As the three enter the Fortress, Zod activates the A.I. and is angered by the information it holds on him: he is called everything, including "madman". As Lois and Clark bring Chris to the Daily Planet, it is attacked, and Clark quickly changes as Non grabs him and throws him out the window where he meets Zod. Meanwhile, Lois tries to escape with Chris until Ursa stops her to grab the child, revealing him to be her and Zod's son, Lor-Zod. As Superman fights Zod, dozens of pods rain from the sky, opened to reveal Phantom Zone villains. Scientist Jax-Ur emerges with a Phantom Zone Projector and sends Superman to the Zone.

Trapped, Superman witnesses the Kryptonian invasion, and he cannot do anything to stop it. Mon-El, whom Clark sent to the Zone when he was younger to preserve his life from fatal lead poisoning, appears before him. Bringing Superman to Fort Rozz, a former prison, he is shown one of the last remaining pods he can use to return home, but prisoner Dev-Em attacks Superman, nearly killing him, until he is slammed into the wall by Mon-El. Using the pod, Superman returns from the Zone to Metropolis, where the city is now enslaved and the buildings transforming into Sunstone structures. He turns to Luthor for help against the criminals when he is attacked by Bizarro, Parasite and Metallo. There, Luthor tells Superman that the Man of Steel will join his team: the Superman Revenge Squad, consisting of Luthor, Parasite, Bizarro, and Metallo.

Showing off his sufficiently advanced weaponry that is easily capable of killing other Kryptonians, Superman asks Luthor why he is still alive. Luthor scoffs at him, saying he would much rather defeat Superman than have him become a martyr. As the squad moves out, Metallo uses various forms of Kryptonite to kill the Kryptonian outlaws. When using gold, a pair of the criminals fall out of the sky with a "splat". When using red, one criminal's DNA shifts irregularly, allowing Metallo to step on his head and crush it. Parasite takes pleasure in siphoning Kryptonian powers from many of the escapees. Bizarro goes toe-to-toe with Non, another mindless brute, as they exchange grunts and tests of strength. Luthor goes after Zod's main fortress, seeking to have the Phantom Zone forcefully "recall" all who had been inside of it. Speaking with Lois, she discovers that as a side-effect, Luthor intends to trap Superman within the Zone along with all of the escaped criminals.

Superman goes straight for Zod and Ursa, taking Chris out of harm's way. During their fight, Zod tries to tell Kal-El that his father had failed him, with Superman saying that his father gave him life. Hearing much of the argument, Chris flies toward the battle as a distraction as Luthor initiates the recall. Before the Zone can trap Superman, Lois knocks Luthor out with a giant crystal. In the midst of the storm, Chris realizes that he is keeping the Zone open and must return in order to close it. Superman appeals to him to find another way, but Chris persists, and thanks both him and Lois for all that they had shown him. Superman flies after him, but is unable to stop him from re-entering the Phantom Zone.

Back in the Fortress, Superman asks Mon-El if he has found Chris; he has not. He says: "I will not stop looking", and flies back into the Phantom Zone to continue his search. As Mon-El is floating away, Superman looks into the Phantom Zone at his friend and simply says: "Thank you".

== Tie-in books ==
During the run of the arc, other issues were released that were connected to the story in some way, with only one written by Richard Donner and Geoff Johns. These were done to explain the backstory to "Last Son", as well as show the changes in continuity to Superman after the effects of Infinite Crisis:

- Action Comics Annual #10: Featured both stories relating to the arc and other bits like the many versions of kryptonite and the map inside the Fortress of Solitude for example. Such stories were "Who is Clark Kent's Big Brother?", which reintroduced Mon-El to the post-Infinite Crisis continuity, and appears in a cameo in "Last Son". "The Criminals of Krypton", set in Krypton's last days, focuses on how Jor-El sent General Zod, Ursa, and Non to the Phantom Zone. It also showed that Non was one of the greatest scientific minds and Jor-El's mentor before the Kryptonian Council lobotomized him into a mute brute.
- Action Comics #847 replaced the fourth part of Last Son when it was delayed. The story focused on Jonathan and Martha Kent after Superman is taken to the Phantom Zone, where fearing the world is over, Jonathan tells Martha a story of how he knew their son could handle the situation.

== Continuity ==
"Last Son" is the first appearance of General Zod, Ursa, and Non in their post-Infinite Crisis incarnations. All three are influenced by the characters' appearance in the films Superman and Superman II. Since Crisis on Infinite Earths, there have been several characters bearing the name of Zod in the Superman comics. However, in current continuity, Superman meets the true Zod for the first time in "Last Son".

In Action Comics Annual #10, Clark Kent's life as a child in Smallville is shown in detail for current continuity. Also, in this issue, continuity returns to having multiple versions of kryptonite, after it had previously been decided to do away with all but the green variety during the Crisis on Infinite Earths storyline.

Chris' fate at the end of the story creates a continuity paradox. Due to the delays in the completion of the story, Chris Kent's appearances in the Superman title during the interim time between "Last Son"'s fourth and fifth parts appeared to take place after "Last Son". This would be impossible, however, since Chris returned to the Phantom Zone at the conclusion of the story. Due to the pronounced scheduling problems with the arc, a line of dialogue was incorporated into Action Comics Annual #11 that insinuates that the invasion of Zod's army took place after Chris received his power-dampening wristwatch, which would place the events of Superman #664, 668, and 673 chronologically before those of Action Comics #846 despite the fact that the latter was released earlier.

Chris Kent's fate was unknown until Action Comics #875, where it was revealed that he is the new Nightwing after the events of "New Krypton".
