= Faora =

- Faora as depicted in Action Comics #472 (June 1977). Art by Bob Oksner.

Publication information
- Publisher: DC Comics
- First appearance: (Hu-Ul): Action Comics #471 (May 1977) (Unknown): Action Comics #779 (July 2001)
- Created by: (Hu-Ul): Cary Bates (writer); Curt Swan (artist) (Unknown): Joe Kelly (writer); Duncan Rouleau (artist)

In-story information
- Full name: Faora Hu-Ul; Zaora Hu-Ul; Artificial Intelligence (AI); Unrevealed
- Species: (Both Hu-Ul): Kryptonian (Unknown): Metahuman
- Partnerships: General Zod; Jax-Ur
- Abilities: (Both Hu-Ul): See list: Superhuman strength, stamina, endurance, speed, agility, reflexes, intelligence, longevity, and hearing; Solar radiation absorption; Enhanced vision; EM spectrum vision; Infra-red vision; Microscopic vision; Telescopic vision; X-ray vision; Invulnerability; Ice and wind breath; Heat vision; Flight; Combat experience; (Pre-Crisis Hu-Ul): Non-corporeal form; Psychic bolts; Telepathy; (Unknown): Molecular disruption

Faora is a supervillain appearing in American comic books published by DC Comics, commonly in association with Superman. The character was created by Cary Bates and Curt Swan, and first appeared in Action Comics #471 (May 1977). Most commonly, Faora is an ally and sometimes the wife or lover of Superman's Kryptonian nemesis General Zod.

Faora appears in the television series Smallville, portrayed by Erica Durance and Sharon Taylor. She also appeared in the DC Extended Universe films Man of Steel (2013) and The Flash (2023), portrayed by Antje Traue.

== Publication history ==
Faora first appeared in Action Comics #471 (May 1977) and was created by Cary Bates and Curt Swan.

== Fictional character biography ==
=== Pre-Crisis ===
The first Faora, Faora Hu-Ul, was introduced in Action Comics #471. She is a Kryptonian woman whose misandry led her to torture and kill 23 men in the secret concentration camp. For this crime, she was sentenced to 300 years of imprisonment in the Phantom Zone. Surviving her homeworld's destruction, along with the other Phantom Zone prisoners, she existed in an invisible ghost-like form. While in the Zone, she is often depicted plotting against Superman with General Zod and Jax-Ur. Her hatred of men was not limited to the Kryptonian race, as she demonstrates with the murder of a young French man who was attracted by her beauty.

Faora is an expert at the Kryptonian martial art of Horo-Kanu, which allows her to take advantage of the body's pressure points. Her skills in martial arts made her an extremely dangerous foe for Superman to face in close combat. When she defeated him during their first encounter, he was forced to flee. During one of her appearances, Faora demonstrated the ability to generate mental lightning, but she did not exhibit this additional power during later battles.

=== Post-Crisis ===
==== Pocket Universe ====
Following the Crisis on Infinite Earths, another Faora (renamed Zaora) appeared in a pocket universe created by the Time Trapper, along with General Zod and Quex-Ul. The three tricked the Pocket Universe's Lex Luthor into releasing them from the Phantom Zone. After the Pocket Earth's population continued to resist their conquest of it, the three villains destroyed the atmosphere, killing almost all life. Superman defeated them by permanently removing their powers with gold Kryptonite. He then executed them with Kryptonite in punishment for their crimes, and to protect the real Earth after they threatened to somehow regain their powers and destroy it as well. Zaora pleaded with Superman for her life, offering him "all sorts of favors", before she succumbed to the Kryptonite.

==== Phantom Zone entity ====
In the Eradicator miniseries, Dr. David Conner was pressured into embracing his programming by another construct of Kem-L. This artifact, which was trapped in the Phantom Zone, claimed to be called Faora, after Kem-L's grandmother, and to be the ultimate repository of Kryptonian mythology. However, it is unclear how much of this is true.

The Eradicator rejects it, "downloading" all these aspects of ancient programming that contradicted his morality into Faora's artificial intelligence. Unknown to him, this gave it a new, monstrous form and dimensional-based powers. After leaving the Zone, it targeted Conner's family. The Eradicator destroyed Faora, but not before it kills his wife.

==== Pokolistanian ====
Another Faora was introduced as one of General Zod's aides in Pokolistan. This character, who debuted in Action Comics #779 (July 2001), is an orphan metahuman. Faora has molecular abilities to a limited degree. She created a mutagenic virus for Zod as part of the linchpin plan. Her whereabouts following the General's defeat are unknown.

==== "Return to Krypton" ====
In a 2001–2002 storyline, Superman and Lois Lane visit a version of Krypton which is later revealed to have been created by Brainiac 13 and based on Jor-El's favorite period in Kryptonian history. In this Krypton, Lois and Clark become fugitives and are pursued by Faora and Kru-El, romantically linked manhunters known as "the Hounds of Zod." This version of Faora, calling herself "the Tigress of Zod", later returns as an ally of Jor-El. She and Kru-El are both killed in a struggle against Kryptonian religious zealots.

=== New 52/DC Rebirth ===
Faora Hu-Ul returned during New 52 where she shared a loathing of Krypton's ideals of peace and science and desired a return to the old days, when Krypton was a brutal militaristic empire. In time, she met Dru-Zod, a colonel who shared the same dream. Zod gathered a group of like-minded supporters, but he became especially interested in Faora because of her blood lust. Faora became complicit in Zod's engineering of a false flag operation, which triggered a war with the alien Char. Jor-El, an old friend of Zod's, discovered the deception and turned Zod over to the authorities. This resulted in the sentencing of Zod and his followers, Faora among them, to the Phantom Zone but later sent Doomsday into the boundaries allowing an escape. But the escape leaves Faora in the zone while Zod tricks Superman into releasing her using the Fortress of Solitude's technology. The duo would later face Superman again and Wonder Woman in the South Pacific, defeating the two after being powered by the Greek god Apollo, throwing their enemies into a nuclear reactor. Zod and Faora attempted to use the Phantom Zone's portal to bring Warworld's armies to Earth, however Superman and Wonder Woman managed to imprison them back in the Phantom Zone by destroying the portal by initiating a nuclear explosion.

Following DC Rebirth, her character was redesigned to be a misandrist mass murderer imprisoned in the Phantom Zone like her Broze Age version. She escaped the Zone to New Thanagar and attempted to steal its Nth metal, but was defeated by Power Girl.

== Powers and abilities ==
As a Kryptonian, Faora has superpowers derived from under the light of Earth's yellow Sun in the Solar System. These basic abilities are sufficient for her to bend steel, overpower a locomotive, leap over a tall building in one bound, and outrun a speeding bullet; as well as virtual invulnerability, accelerated recovery, laser eyebeams, vortex breath, and flight. She possesses extraordinary senses of hearing and sight, including x-ray, telescopic, and microscopic vision. The Pre-Crisis version of Faora had gotten new powers. She can telepathically communicate or sometimes does it unconsciously and project bolts of psychic energy to weaken other Kryptonians from the Phantom Zone. While in the Zone, she is effectively immortal (and untouchable). Faora is skilled in Horu-Kanu – a deadly form of martial arts that utilizes precise pressure points to disable, cripple, or kill opponents. Both versions have expertise in unarmed combat. Even her power levels are more akin to Supergirl. Like all Kryptonians, she is also vulnerable to Kryptonite, red sunlight, and magic.

The metahuman version of Faora has the ability to disrupt molecular bonds.

== Other versions ==
An alternate universe variant of Faora appears in DC Comics Bombshells. This version is a former ally of Lara and Alura who was banished to the Phantom Zone for her murderous tendencies. Faora is later freed by Thanagarians, obtains a sample of Raven's blood, and transforms into a monster resembling Doomsday.

== In other media ==
=== Television ===
- Faora appears in the Superman (1988) episode "The Hunter", voiced by Ginny McSwain.
- Faora makes a non-speaking cameo appearance in the Legion of Super Heroes episode "Phantoms" as an inmate of the Phantom Zone.
- Faora appears in Smallville, portrayed by Sharon Taylor. This version is a native of Kandor, loyal follower and wife of Major Zod, and co-creator of Doomsday who has a younger sister named Vala and was imprisoned in the Phantom Zone as a disembodied wraith. In the eighth season episode "Bloodline", Faora escapes, possesses Lois Lane (portrayed by Erica Durance), and battles Clark Kent until Kara Kent exorcises Faora from Lane's body. In the ninth season, Tess Mercer uses a Kryptonian device called the "Orb" to create clones of several Kandorians, such as a young Faora and Zod. After she and Vala are taken by Amanda Waller, Faora offers to join Checkmate, but is killed by Zod, who learns too late that she was pregnant with their child.
  - Additionally, an alternate timeline version of Faora's clone who acquired Kryptonian superpowers appears in the episode "Pandora".
- Faora appears in The Looney Tunes Show episode "SuperRabbit", voiced by Sonya Walger.
- Faora appears in Justice League Action, voiced by Fryda Wolff.
- Faora appears in Young Justice, voiced by Denise Boutte.

=== Film ===
- Faora purportedly served as inspiration for Superman (1978) and Superman II's incarnation of Ursa despite being introduced in the comics while the films were in the midst of production.
- Faora-Ul appears in the DC Extended Universe (DCEU) film Man of Steel, portrayed by Antje Traue. Gal Gadot was originally offered the part, but declined due to being pregnant at the time. This version is General Zod's lieutenant who, along with the rest of their battalion, the Sword of Rao, was sentenced to life imprisonment in the Phantom Zone. Following Krypton's destruction, the Sword of Rao escape and head to Earth to search for Kal-El and the Codex, a device containing the genetic code of all future Kryptonians, only to be defeated and returned to the Phantom Zone.
  - An alternate timeline version of Faora appears in The Flash. After Barry Allen accidentally creates the "Flashpoint" timeline while averting his mother's death, the Sword of Rao seek out Kara Zor-El for the Codex instead. After they successfully kill her, Allen and his Flashpoint counterpart repeatedly travel back in time in failed attempts to save Kara, leading to the Flashpoint Allen killing Faora.

=== Video games ===
- Faora appears as a character summon in Scribblenauts Unmasked: A DC Comics Adventure.
- The Man of Steel incarnation of Faora appears as a playable character in Lego Batman 3: Beyond Gotham via DLC.
