= Thara Ak-Var =

- Thara Ak-Var as Flamebird, as depicted in Action Comics #886 (April 2010). Art by Pere Pérez.

Publication information
- Publisher: DC Comics
- First appearance: Superman #681 (October 2008)
- Created by: Geoff Johns; James Robinson

In-story information
- Full name: Thara Ak-Var
- Species: Kryptonian
- Place of origin: Krypton
- Partnerships: Nightwing (Lor-Zod); Supergirl (Kara Zor-El)
- Notable aliases: Flamebird
- Abilities: Powers and abilities identical to those of Superman: Superhuman strength, super speed, flight, stamina and freezing breath, super hearing, multiple extrasensory and vision powers Flamebird powers: Pyrokinesis; Rapid healing; Immunity to gold kryptonite; Psychic link to Chris Kent

Thara Ak-Var is a fictional character appearing in comic books published by DC Comics, created by Geoff Johns and James Robinson. The character first appeared during the Superman: New Krypton storyline in Superman #681 (October 2008). She is the latest character to take on the role of Flamebird. Along with Nightwing (Chris Kent), Thara is the feature character in Action Comics beginning with issue #875 (May 2009). Thara Ak-Var's name is a reference to Ak-Var, the second pre-Crisis Flamebird, and his wife Thara.

Esmé Bianco portrays Thara in the third season of Supergirl.

== Fictional character biography ==
=== Silver Age ===
In the Silver Age, Thara is the wife of Ak-Var, the assistant of her uncle, scientist Van-Zee. Van-Zee dons the Nightwing costume to rescue a captured Superman. After Superman and Jimmy Olsen's departure from Kandor, Van-Zee assumes the role of Nightwing full-time. Ak-Var later becomes Flamebird, Van-Zee's crime-fighting partner.

=== Modern Age ===
Thara Ak-Var lived in Argo City and was a childhood friend of Kara Zor-El. While Kara's parents were members of the Science Guild, Thara's parents were both of the Military Guild and had served under General Zod.

Thara was among the few survivors of Krypton’s destruction. Zor-El created a force field around Argo City to protect it using technology found after Brainiac’s capture of Kandor. Sensing his own technology being used, Brainiac tracked down Argo City and began to integrate it with Kandor, and killing those who tried to stop him, including Thara's parents. While Zor-El and Alura assisted their daughter in escaping, everyone else in Argo City was captured by Brainiac, including Thara.

Life in the shrunken city continued, though at a slower rate than the rest of the universe. Despite her young age and inexperience in actual combat, Thara was made chief of security for Kandor.

Shortly afterward, Thara is approached by Kandor's religious guild, who give her a vision of the Flamebird, a mythical Kryptonian creature. The religious guild, believing Thara to be the avatar of Flamebird, take her into their ranks. Thara later gains a physic connection with Chris Kent, who is connected to Nightwing, Flamebird's partner deity. Reclaiming her position as chief of security, Thara frees Chris from the Phantom Zone and brings him to Kandor in secret.

After Superman liberates Argo City and Kandor, Thara moves to Earth and begins operating on Earth as the superhero Flamebird, aided by Chris as Nightwing. In the 2010 miniseries Superman: War of the Supermen, Sam Lane and Lex Luthor turn Reactron into a living bomb that destroys New Krypton. At the same time, Lane and Luthor use elements from the Rao construct to turn the sun red, which depowers the surviving Kryptonians and causes many of them to die in space. Flamebird sacrifices herself by unleashing her power within the sun to restore its original color.

== Powers and abilities ==
Thara has all the standard abilities of a Kryptonian exposed to the light of a yellow sun: super strength, super speed, invulnerability, flight, heat vision, super-breath, x-ray vision, and super hearing. She also possesses an undefined connection to the mythic "Flamebird" entity, which gives her pyrokinesis, immunity to gold kryptonite, and a psychic link with Chris Kent.

Like all Kryptonians, Thara is weakened by kryptonite radiation and fatally vulnerable to prolonged exposure.

== In other media ==
- Thara Ak-Var appears in Supergirl, portrayed by Esmé Bianco. This version is the police chief of Argo City.
- A young Thara Ak-Var appears in Superman: Unbound, voiced by Melissa Disney.
