= Lor-Zod =

Fictional superhero in DC Comics

- Lor-Zod as Nightwing on the cover of Action Comics #883 (January 2010). Art by Pere Pérez.

Publication information
- Publisher: DC Comics
- First appearance: Action Comics #844 (December 2006)
- Created by: Richard Donner; Geoff Johns; Adam Kubert

In-story information
- Full name: Lor-Zod; Christopher "Chris" Kent (Pre-Flashpoint; Earth identity)
- Species: Kryptonian
- Place of origin: Fort Roz, Phantom Zone
- Team affiliations: Justice League; Superman Family; House of Zod; Sinister Sons
- Partnerships: Sinson; Flamebird (Thara Ak-Var)
- Notable aliases: Nightwing; Eradicator
- Abilities: Superhuman strength, speed, stamina, durability, agility, and reflexes; Solar energy absorption; Flight; Telekinesis; Electromagnetic spectrum vision; Telescopic vision; Microscopic vision; Heat vision; X-ray vision; Infrared vision; Freezing breath; Super-hearing; Invulnerability; Longevity; Phantom Zone immunity; Shadow manipulation

Lor-Zod is a fictional character appearing in American comic books published by DC Comics. The character first appeared in Action Comics #844 (December 2006) and was created by Richard Donner, Geoff Johns, and Adam Kubert. The biological son of Superman villains General Zod and Ursa born in the Phantom Zone, the character was originally the white sheep of the House of Zod adopted by Superman and Lois Lane, naming him Christopher "Chris" Kent. After being aged rapidly in part due to being born in the Phantom Zone, he used the Nightwing codename and was inspired by his adoptive parents in becoming a superhero, partnered with Thara Ak-Var as Flamebird. Following DC Rebirth, Lor-Zod was reinterpreted as a supervillain, with his Chris Kent identity being written out of continuity. This version is loyal to his father's ideologies and philosophy and is partnered with Sinson, the alleged child of Sinestro.

An adaptation of the villainous version of Lor-Zod appears in the animated series Young Justice, voiced by Phil Morris.

== Publication history ==
He first appeared in Action Comics #844 (December 2006), in the story arc Superman: Last Son, and was created by Richard Donner, Geoff Johns, and Adam Kubert. The character had later assumed the role of Nightwing. Over a decade later, a new version of Lor-Zod was introduced in 2017 during DC Rebirth in the Action Comics series during the "Revenge" storyline, this time as a villain.

== Fictional character biography ==
=== "Last Son" ===
When a spacecraft falls towards Metropolis, it is diverted to a relatively safe landing by Superman. After its landing, Superman discovers a Kryptonian boy inside, who is taken to the east coast lab of the Department of Metahuman Affairs for observation.

The boy is initially only able to speak Kryptonian and does not know his name or where he came from. After he is confirmed as a Kryptonian, the boy is immediately taken to the Department of Metahuman Affairs headquarters in Washington, D.C. without Superman's knowledge. He removes the boy from their custody, and decides to raise him with Lois Lane. Clark then contacts Batman, who names the boy Christopher Kent.

Chris attends the Ellsworth School, an elite private school, where he has difficulty concealing his powers. Superman and Batman develop an implant concealed in a wristwatch that uses red sun radiation to block Chris' powers until he learns to control them. However, the wristwatch fails due to being calibrated on the metabolism of an adult Kryptonian and explodes, wrecking Clark and Lois' apartment. Clark reassures Chris that he will not be sent away and that he would find a way to cope with his growing powers.

Superman holds a press conference to inform the world that Chris was under his care. At that time, Bizarro, sent by Lex Luthor, attempts to kidnap Chris. Later, it was revealed that Chris is the biological son of General Zod and Ursa. His arrival on Earth released Zod, Non, and Ursa from the Phantom Zone. He was apparently conceived and raised in the Phantom Zone within a prison where time passed normally. In a battle with Superman, Zod and Ursa reclaim Chris, send Superman to the Phantom Zone, and invade Earth. Superman escapes with Mon-El's aid, then allies with Lex Luthor to defeat Zod, who had captured a large portion of Earth's superhero population. After Zod and his army are defeated, Chris pursues them into the Phantom Zone to ensure that they cannot escape, since the entrance to the Phantom Zone will remain weak as long as he is on Earth.

=== Nightwing ===
After returning to the Phantom Zone, Chris enters the Kryptonian prison where his parents had made shelter. There, he finds a piece of Brainiac's technology that gives him a mental link to Thara Ak-Var, security chief of Kandor. When the citizens of Kandor create New Krypton, which was placed in orbit around the Sun opposite Earth, Chris and Thara task themselves with bringing in the Phantom Zone Kryptonian criminals hiding on Earth as sleeper agents. Since the belligerent government of Alura Zor-El and Zod had tarnished all Kryptonians' reputations on Earth, Chris and Thara decided to act as a new Nightwing and Flamebird duo (since Dick Grayson, the previous Nightwing, became the new Batman), at first with simple cloth masks, then with fake power suits, to obscure the origins of their powers.

Chris, due to his birth in the Phantom Zone, undergoes uncontrollable growth spurts: when Thara saved him he was still the young boy raised by Lois and Clark, as Nightwing he is shown as roughly 15 or 16, and after another growth spurt of about seven years, he is about 23 years old.

Chris's mother, Ursa, begins stalking him to exact revenge. Chris is shown denying his heritage and insisting Thara address him with his "human" name, despising her attempts to transliterate it as a Kryptonian name, and never going by his true Kryptonian name of Lor-Zod. After a brutal attack by Ursa, Thara is left gravely wounded by a kryptonite knife and Chris is forced to bring her to Lois for medical assistance.

Upon bringing Thara to Lois, Chris and Lois have a tearful reunion. Lois is happy to see him again but is concerned about his advanced aging. Lois calls Doctor Light for medical assistance while Chris goes back to the fortress and is again confronted by Ursa. Their conflict is cut short as UAVs sent by Sam Lane arrived at the scene, forcing both to flee.

=== Framed for murder ===
Chris and Thara are teleported away, along with Supergirl. The three are attacked by Guardian and the Science Police, for apparently killing Mon-El. Chris tries to tell Guardian that they did not murder Mon-El, but Guardian ignores him. The three manage to escape to Paris.

During a battle with Reactron, Thara is injured while attempting to protect Supergirl. As Reactron is about to kill Chris and Kara, Thara manifests her Flamebird powers and personality, and easily overpowers Reactron. Flamebird decides to kill Reactron but is swayed to show mercy after Reactron reveals that Mon-El is alive and is talked down by Supergirl. The Flamebird persona is once more submerged after sharing a kiss with Chris.

Donning new costumes, Chris and Thara continue to save lives, despite their actions being twisted by the anti-Kryptonian media. Not long after, Chris experiences another aging spurt, becoming an old man. Doctor Light brings Chris to her colleague, Doctor Pillings, who, unbeknownst to any of them, is the Kryptonian sleeper agent Jax-Ur. Jax-Ur cures Chris, reverting him to his young adult form and takes a sample of his DNA.

Jax-Ur unleashes a replica of the Kryptonian deity Rao and banishes Chris to the Phantom Zone. Chris is contacted by Nightwing, another Kryptonian entity, opposite and lover of Flamebird. Nightwing reveals that while Thara is truly the host of Flamebird, so is he Nightwing's. Seeing that Thara and the others will not hold out much longer against Jax-Ur, Chris becomes Nightwing's avatar and returns to Earth. Nightwing absorbs Rao's heart into the Phantom Zone, then destroys the Rao construct.

During the War of the Supermen storyline, the Sun is turned red by the combined efforts of Sam Lane and Lex Luthor. Thara sacrifices herself to restore it to its yellow coloration, which disintegrates her body. Chris attempts to join her, but the Nightwing entity spirits him away.

In the final confrontation between Superman and Zod, Chris pushes Zod back into the Phantom Zone. Once back in the Zone, Chris returns to being a young boy, and encounters Mon-El once again.

=== Rebirth ===
Following the New 52 reboot, Chris Kent was erased from continuity. Later during DC Rebirth, a new version of Lor-Zod was introduced, this one more loyal to his father General Zod. The House of Zod rules over Jekuul, a planet with two yellow suns.

== Powers and abilities ==
=== Original version ===
The Chis Kent version possess a mutated Kryptonian genetic structure as a result of being born in the Phantom Zone; while possess the average Kryptonian power set, which includes a superhuman physiology, heat vision, x-ray vision, and ice breath. He also possess "tactile telekinesis", either from his origin from the Phantom Zone or an interaction with Brainiac, and is resistant to kryptonite. Within the Phantom Zone, he has a solid body and ages normally. After becoming the host of the Kryptonian Nightwing deity, he inherited the deities' power over shadows, able to manipulate, teleport at will, and has heightened awareness associated with it, able to sense others and is capable of perceiving innermost desires and secrets.

Due to his unique circumstances regarding his birth, the character's Kryptonian powers are considered lesser than the rest of his race under a yellow sun. Outside the Phantom Zone, he ages rapidly and required advanced technology to stabilize his growth. Like other Kryptonians, he is susceptible to kryptonite (at a lesser extent but is still considered lethal), magic, and red sun energy (without the aid of his Nightwing powers).

=== Current version ===
Lor-Zod possess the common power set possessed by Kryptonians under a yellow sun, which includes superhuman strength, speed, invulnerability, and heat vision. Lor was also trained by both his parents, making him a skilled combatant and knowledgeable in technology derived from Krypton. However, he also possess the typical weaknesses among his race, including susceptibility to kryptonite, magic, and red sun energy.

== Other versions ==
An alternate universe version of Chris Kent from Earth-16 appears in Countdown: Arena. This version is a physically and spiritually evolved individual with access to vast powers beyond those of regular Kryptonians. While fighting the Supermen of Earth-30 and Earth-31, he sacrifices himself in an attempt to kill Nathaniel Adam / Monarch.

== In other media ==
- An original version of Lor-Zod appears in Krypton, portrayed by Emmanuel Ighodaro. This version is a member of the Sagitari squadron and great-grandfather of General Zod.
- A version of the second Lor-Zod appears in Young Justice, voiced by Phil Morris. This version was born in the 31st century after the United Planets released his parents, Dru-Zod and Ursa Zod, from the Phantom Zone. While Lor's parents were sent back to the Zone by the Legion of Super-Heroes for attempting a coup, the United Planets pardoned Lor due to his age. Developing a hatred for the Legion after they destroyed the Phantom Zone projector, Lor stole kryptonite and a time sphere to go back to the past and kill Superboy, who inspired the Legion. On Mars, he planted his kryptonite on Ma'alefa'ak's gene bomb, with Phantom Girl transporting Superboy to the Phantom Zone after he is nearly killed while trying to stop it. After allying with Darkseid to gain access to the Phantom Zone projector inside Metron's vault, Lor succeeds in freeing his parents and a brainwashed Superboy and brings them to Earth, only for the Team to restore Superboy's mind and stop the Zods. Lor escapes in his time sphere, unaware that Metron pre-programmed it to bring him to the moment of Superboy's apparent death and be killed by Ma'alefa'ak's bomb.
