= Jax-Ur =

- Jax-Ur depicted in Action Comics #883 (January 2010), art by Pere Pérez.

Publication information
- Publisher: DC Comics
- First appearance: Adventure Comics #289 (October 1961)
- Created by: Otto Binder; George Papp

In-story information
- Species: Kryptonian
- Place of origin: Krypton
- Partnerships: General Zod; Faora
- Notable aliases: Dr. Phillings
- Abilities: See list: Superhuman strength, stamina, endurance, speed, agility, reflexes, intelligence, longevity, and hearing; Solar radiation absorption; Enhanced vision; EM spectrum vision; Infra-red vision; Microscopic vision; Telescopic vision; X-ray vision; Invulnerability; Ice and wind breath; Heat vision; Flight; Proficiency in xenobiology and genetics

Jax-Ur is a supervillain appearing in American comic books published by DC Comics, usually as an adversary of Superman. Created by writer Otto Binder and artist George Papp, the character first appeared in Adventure Comics #289 (October 1961). He has been described as "the worst troublemaker in the Phantom Zone" and was the first criminal banished there.

Jax-Ur has appeared in various media outside comics, primarily in association with Superman. He is voiced by Ron Perlman in Superman: The Animated Series and Andrew Kishino in Young Justice, while Mackenzie Gray portrays him in Man of Steel. A gender-flipped version of the character appears in Krypton, portrayed by Hannah Waddingham.

== Fictional character biography ==
=== Pre-Crisis ===
Jax-Ur was an amoral and criminally deviant scientist on the planet Krypton. He was imprisoned in the Phantom Zone for destroying Wegthor, a sparsely inhabited moon of Krypton with a population of 500, while experimenting with a nuclear warhead. His sentence for his act of mass murder was imprisonment for eternity. He called himself "the worst criminal in the Phantom Zone".

Jax-Ur's intention was to launch a nuclear missile to destroy a passing space rock. If this test proved successful, Jax-Ur would then commence the creation of a nuclear arsenal with which he would overthrow the Kryptonian government, and place the entire planet under his dominion. In the World of Krypton miniseries, his missile collides with a spaceship piloted by Jor-El and goes off-course to destroy Wegthor. As a result, space travel was banned on Krypton.

In his first appearance, Jax-Ur escapes from the Phantom Zone and posed as Jonathan Kent. Superboy eventually sends Jax-Ur back to the Phantom Zone. He then uses Supergirl (Kara Zor-El)'s tears (acquired through psychic communication with Fred Danvers) to escape from the Phantom Zone, but was defeated by Mon-El. Jax-Ur was often depicted plotting against Superman with fellow Phantom Zone inmates General Zod and Faora Hu-Ul. Although he possessed typical Kryptonian super-powers when on Earth, Jax-Ur was no match for Superman in combat.

Jax-Ur later helps Superman defeat Black Zero, the alien saboteur who ensured Krypton's destruction under the orders of the Pirate Empire. It is shown he has a code of honor, as Kryptonian criminals swear by a master criminal who escaped a prison to help each other. After being struck by Black Zero's red kryptonite bullet, Jax-Ur is transformed into a Medusa-like creature and petrifies him before willingly returning to the Phantom Zone.

=== Post-Crisis ===
Following Crisis on Infinite Earths, DC Comics enforced Superman's status as the last surviving Kryptonian, thereby writing Jax-Ur and other Kryptonian characters out of continuity. Jax-Ur's first post-Crisis appearance is in Action Comics #846, written by Geoff Johns and Richard Donner. He is one of the criminals unleashed from the Phantom Zone by Zod. In the current continuity, Jax-Ur destroyed Krypton's moon during an attempt at interstellar space travel. When the moon was destroyed, a lunar colony of Kandor was lost as well, drawing the attention of Brainiac to Kandor.

In Action Comics #875, Jax-Ur is one of Zod's "sleeper Kryptonians", who have adopted human identities to help further Zod's goals on Earth. He works for S.T.A.R. Labs as a xenobiologist, during which Doctor Light tasks him with investigating Chris Kent's accelerated aging. Jax-Ur builds a device tailored to regulate Chris's growth and stimulate his healing factor to reverse the body damage done by his condition. It is later revealed that, like Chris Kent and Thara Ak-Var are avatars of Nightwing and Flamebird, respectively, so is Jax-Ur an avatar of their enemy, Vohc the Breaker. Continuing his age-old vendetta against the two gods, Jax-Ur/Vohc uses a DNA sample taken from Flamebird to create an artificial clone of the Kryptonian god Rao. The combined entity is defeated by Flamebird and Nightwing burning Jax-Ur out of Vohc, while the Rao clone is destroyed by Nightwing.

=== The New 52 ===
In The New 52 continuity reboot, Jax-Ur first appears among the Kryptonian criminals seen in the Phantom Zone and claims to have destroyed a moon. Jax-Ur was fully introduced in flashbacks depicted in the World of Krypton series, where he is depicted as a military officer and Lara's partner and fiancé. Lara calls off their engagement when Jax-Ur reveals he supports Colonel Ekar, a commanding officer who deems Krypton's Science Council weak and self-absorbed and plans to overthrow it in a coup d'état. When Lara tries to fight Ekar and is defeated and caught, Jax-Ur tries to convince her to join their cause to save her life, but fails. General Zod intervenes, killing Ekar and smothering the revolution. Jax-Ur is imprisoned with the other surviving insurgents, promising Lara he tried to save her and reaffirming his love for her.

=== World's Finest ===
Jax-Ur appears in Batman/Superman World's Finest #18 (October 2023) and #19 (November 2023) in a storyline detailing the first team-up of Batman and Superman. Jax-Ur uses a breach in the Phantom Zone to escape to Earth and sends Batman to take his place in the Phantom Zone.

== Powers and abilities ==
Like all Kryptonians, Jax-Ur possesses superhuman abilities derived from the yellow solar radiation of the sun of Earth's solar system. His basic abilities are superhuman strength, superhuman speed and superhuman stamina sufficient to bend steel in his bare hands, overpower a locomotive, leap over a tall building in a single bound and outrun a speeding bullet; he possesses heightened senses of hearing and sight including X-ray vision as well as telescopic and microscopic vision; virtual invulnerability; accelerated healing; longevity; powerful freezing breath; heat vision; and flight. His powers are generally depicted as being on par with General Zod.

Jax-Ur is generally depicted as both a scientist as well as a military warrior. He is exceptionally intelligent in the areas of cloning as well as xenobiology; able to study Kryptonian genetics to determine connections between the respective Nightwing and Flamebird entities as well as how to create synthesized clones of avatars suitable to host the spirit of the red sun god Rao whom the Kryptonians worshiped. As a soldier, Jax-Ur is a competent military leader and hand-to-hand combatant with experience on the field of battle similar to General Zod and other imprisoned Kryptonian military dissidents.

In addition to his inherent Kryptonian abilities while beneath a yellow sun, Jax-Ur also served as a vessel for the alien god Vohc the Breaker. While merged and possessed by Vohc, Jax-Ur possesses increased superhuman strength as well as being vastly more intelligent with wisdom approaching virtual omniscience. Vohc was also immortal with a vastly superior healing factor rendering him effectively indestructible and possessed of divine power sufficient to place him on similar levels of godly power as the Olympians and other pantheons of Earthly deities. However, his powers were beneath Rao as well as Nightwing and Flamebird.

Like all Kryptonians, Jax-Ur is vulnerable to kryptonite and red solar radiation, which drains his powers. His virtual invulnerability offers no protection from mind control or magic, nor can it fully withstand the force of an atomic explosion or the force of opponents with greater strength and durability such as Doomsday. His superhuman strength is inferior to beings such as Doomsday and his superhuman speed is inferior to speedsters such as the Flash.

== Other versions ==
An alternate dream world incarnation of Jax-Ur appears in "For the Man Who Has Everything". This version became a martyr after inspiring a group of protestors who consider his imprisonment in the Phantom Zone to be cruel and unusual punishment and seek to free him.

== In other media ==
=== Television ===
- Jax-Ur, with elements of General Zod, appears in Superman: The Animated Series, voiced by Ron Perlman. This version is a High General and military genius who sought to overthrow Krypton's Science Council years prior to the series, only to be foiled by Jor-El and sentenced to life imprisonment in the Phantom Zone while his co-conspirator, Mala, was sentenced to 30 years. In the two-part episode "Blasts from the Past", Superman frees Mala, believing she had reformed after completing her sentence, but she later frees Jax-Ur after learning of the powers they gain from a yellow sun. Together, they go on a rampage until Superman and his allies send them back to the Phantom Zone. As of the episode "Absolute Power", Jax-Ur and Mala escaped once more via a space rift, were rescued by alien voyagers, and took over their planet. Superman joins forces with a rebel movement to lure Jax-Ur and Mala into space, where they are pulled into a black hole.
- A female incarnation of Jax-Ur appears in Krypton, portrayed by Hannah Waddingham. Formerly known as Sela-Sonn, this version is the leader of the Black Zero terrorist organization and former member of Krypton's Science Guild who forms an alliance with a time-travelling Dru-Zod, among others, to defend Krypton against Brainiac while serving as a mother figure to the clone Nyssa-Vex. Following Dru's rise to power and Black Zero's disbandment, Jax-Ur becomes co-leader of a resistance movement against him alongside Val-El, but is banished from the group after executing Dru's mother, Lyta-Zod.
- Jax-Ur appears in Young Justice, voiced by Andrew Kishino.
- Dax-Ur appears in Smallville, episode: "Persona" (s7e10), portrayed by Marc McClure.

=== Film ===
Jax-Ur appears in Man of Steel, portrayed by Mackenzie Gray. This version is the lead scientist of General Zod's battalion, the Sword of Rao.

=== Video games ===
Jax-Ur appears as a character summon in Scribblenauts Unmasked: A DC Comics Adventure.

=== Miscellaneous ===
- Jax-Ur appears in the novel "The Last Days of Krypton", by Kevin J. Anderson. This version is a historical figure from Krypton's past who tried to take over the planet and destroyed its moon, Koron, with a "Nova javelin", a nuclear weapon developed from alien technology. After being defeated by the "Seven Armies" coalition, led by Jor-El's ancestor Sor-El, and assassinated by a former underling, Jax-Ur's actions influenced Krypton's policy towards alien or innovative science.
- The Superman: The Animated Series incarnation of Jax-Ur appears in Superman Adventures.
- The Superman: The Animated Series incarnation of Jax-Ur appears in Justice League Unlimited #34 as a member of General Zod's army who was sent to the Phantom Zone.
- The Superman: The Animated Series incarnation of Jax-Ur appears in the Justice League Beyond 2.0 tie-in comic book. While in the Phantom Zone, he manipulates a young boy he named Zod-Ur, who possesses telekinesis and the ability to control most Kryptonian technology, and Superman into facilitating their escape in the hopes of leading their fellow inmates in conquering Earth. However, the pair are defeated by Superman and the Justice League.

== See also ==
- List of Superman enemies
