= Scooby-Doo! and Krypto, Too! =

American animated direct-to-video film

- DVD cover
- Directed by: Cecilia Aranovich Hamilton
- Written by: T. K. O'Brian
- Based on: Scooby-Doo by William Hanna, Joseph Barbera, Iwao Takamoto, Joe Ruby, & Ken Spears Krypto by Otto Binder, Curt Swan, & DC Comics
- Produced by: Rick Morales; Jim Krieg; Sam Register (executive producer)
- Starring: Frank Welker; Grey DeLisle; Matthew Lillard; Kate Micucci
- Edited by: Kyle Stafford
- Music by: Robert J. Kral
- Production companies: Warner Bros. Animation; DC Entertainment
- Distributed by: Warner Bros. Home Entertainment
- Release date: September 26, 2023 (United States)
- Running time: 76 minutes
- Country: United States
- Language: English

Scooby-Doo! and Krypto, Too! is a 2023 American animated direct-to-video superhero comedy film produced by Warner Bros. Animation and is distributed by Warner Bros. Home Entertainment. It is the thirty-eighth entry in the direct-to-video series of Scooby-Doo films, and features crossover appearances by several DC Comics characters.

== Plot ==
Months since the Justice League mysteriously disappeared, Lois Lane and Jimmy Olsen investigate the Hall of Justice, but are quickly chased out by a phantom, prompting them to call Mystery Inc. for help. En route to Metropolis, the gang discover that the city is overrun by villains (Giganta, Solomon Grundy, Joker, Harley Quinn, General Zod, Non, Ursa, and Brainiac) as a result of the missing Justice League. Barely escaping to the Daily Planet, they meet up with Lois and Jimmy (who proclaims Daphne to be his girlfriend, despite her protests) and they explain the situation to them. Touring the Hall of Justice, they also meet Lex Luthor, Mercy Graves, and Luthor's dog, Rex Ruthor.

Suddenly, the phantom appears and menaces the gang, only to be fended off by a mysterious superpowered dog, who initiates a lockdown on the gang so the phantom cannot escape. Trapped inside with Luthor and his associates, he introduces the dog to the gang as Krypto, Superman's pet dog, who quickly becomes friends with Scooby-Doo. Continuing their investigation, Shaggy, Scooby, and Krypto raid the Kitchen (believing it to be an actual one), but accidentally summon holograms of the Legion of Doom, malfunctioning the control panel. Shaggy and Scooby distract the holograms long enough for Krypto to shut them down, and the gang finds holographic footage of the moment the Justice League disappeared, only to learn that Solomon Grundy has infiltrated the building, instigating a long chase against them.

After Grundy suddenly vanishes in a flash of light, the gang learn that there are more phantoms in the Hall of Justice. Velma figures out the culprit behind the mystery: Mercy Graves, who wanted to convert the Hall of Justice into her own supervillain headquarters behind Luthor's back after trapping the Justice League in the Phantom Zone using the Phantom Zone Projector, which explains the phantoms themselves. Before the gang can declare the mystery solved, Luthor suddenly hijacks Mercy's scheme, revealing that he knew about it and used it to cover up his plan to rule Metropolis with an army of robots. Rex is also revealed to be a robot and fights Krypto over the Phantom Zone Projector while the gang is preoccupied with Luthor and Mercy's army. Despite Rex having the advantage with Kryptonite in his circuitry, Krypto eventually manages to come out victorious and uses the projector to trap the robot army and free the Justice League (Superman, Wonder Woman, Aquaman, Flash and Hawkman) and even Solomon Grundy.

In the aftermath, Luthor and Mercy are arrested while Grundy is revealed to have been trying to befriend Scooby, albeit aggressively. With the case closed, Mystery Inc. meets Clark Kent (whom Velma immediately recognizes as Superman), Jimmy "breaks up" with Daphne, and Scooby and Krypto share one last snack with Flash.

== Cast ==
- Frank Welker as Scooby-Doo, Fred Jones
- Matthew Lillard as Shaggy Rogers
- Grey DeLisle as Daphne Blake, Wonder Woman, Giganta
- Kate Micucci as Velma Dinkley
- P. J. Byrne as J.B.
- Charles Halford as Lex Luthor
- Victoria Grace as Mercy Graves
- Nolan North as Superman, Joker, Computer
- Tara Strong as Lois Lane, Harley Quinn, Helen
- Fred Tatasciore as Solomon Grundy, Perry White
- James Arnold Taylor as Jimmy Olsen, Rex Ruthor
- Niccole Thurman as Mayor Fleming

== Production ==
It was in development by 2021. On February 2, 2023, James Gunn confirmed that all animated DC projects are being released as DC Elseworlds. In March 2023, it was alleged to be canceled as a tax write-off for parent company Warner Bros. Discovery's cost-saving efforts, and was subsequently leaked online. On July 26, 2023, it was confirmed to not be canceled, and a trailer was released on July 27, with a release date of September 26.

This marks the fourth time that original Scooby-Doo creators Joe Ruby and Ken Spears posthumously receive special credit following Scooby-Doo! The Sword and the Scoob, Straight Outta Nowhere: Scooby-Doo! Meets Courage the Cowardly Dog, and Trick or Treat Scooby-Doo!, due to their respective deaths in August and November 2020.
