= Superman (1987 video game) =

- North American cover art
- Developer: Kotobuki Systems
- Publisher: Kemco
- Designer: Jun Ishikawa
- Composers: Hiroyuki Masuno, Ryu Hasegawa
- Platform: NES
- Release: JP: December 26, 1987; NA: December 1988
- Genre: Action-adventure
- Mode: Single-player

Superman is a 1987 NES video game by Kemco based on the DC Comics character. The Japanese release featured a synthesized version of the 1978 film's score, but in the US version, it was replaced by music from another Kemco title, Indora no Hikari, a fantasy-RPG released the same year for the Famicom.

== Gameplay ==
In the game, the player controls Superman on a quest to save the city of Metropolis from the evil Lex Luthor and a gang of criminals that were exiled from the planet Krypton. The game had an overhead map of various locations in the city that the player can travel to, with animated scenes, but then the gameplay would switch to a more traditional side-scrolling adventure game.

Superman has multiple energy bars; one for stamina and the others for "Super Power". He can collect various icons in the game to use a limited supply of one of his item powers: x-ray vision, superflight, super spin, heat vision (laser attack), and super breath 1 and super breath 2 (freeze enemies). One of the main differences from the comics was that Superman's x-ray vision was used to make invisible enemies visible. The instruction booklet explained that inconsistency by claiming that "Superman is now unable to see inside buildings, as Lex has lined all the buildings in Metropolis with lead!" Aside from the item powers, Superman can also jump and punch. Players start out the game as Clark Kent but can change into Superman (provided that they have enough Super Power) by entering into one of the phone booths that are scattered throughout the city. However, taking sufficient damage from enemies would cause Superman to become Clark Kent. Whenever Superman entered the Daily Planet building he would always revert to Clark Kent, no matter what his power level was. The game also came with an area map that split up the districts of Metropolis and allowed Superman to use his superflight power to quickly change areas. Occasionally a "Help!" signal would appear on the map, such as a person being mugged, to which Superman could fly to that area immediately and aid the person in need. Another way to cross the city would be mass transit, where Clark Kent would be given a subway pass upon the start of the second stage.

When various enemies were defeated or at random points in the game, items would appear which were Super Power icons to replenish exhausted abilities or red or green Kryptonite would appear, which would decrease the stamina of Superman and Clark Kent. Conversely, blue Kryptonian power crystals would appear upon defeating enemies or at random, which would increase the stamina level.

At the end of each city level, or "chapter", the player battles a different boss and, upon defeating the boss, is given an animated front page of a Daily Planet newspaper praising their success. The second to the last chapter boss in the game is Lex Luthor. This is followed by three fights in a row against the exiled criminals from Krypton; Ursa, Non and General Zod at the "Statue of Freedom", à la the Statue of Liberty.
