= Superman: New Krypton =

DC Comic Storyline

"New Krypton"
- Incentive variant cover of Superman: New Krypton Special #1 (December 2008), art by Renato Guedes.
- Publisher: DC Comics
- Publication date: December 2008 – March 2009
- Genre: Superhero; Crossover
Title(s)
Action Comics #866-889, annual #12
Adventure Comics Special Featuring the Guardian #1
Supergirl #34-52, annual #1
Superman #677-700, annual #14
Superman: New Krypton Special #1
Adventure Comics #8-11
Superman's Pal, Jimmy Olsen Special #1-2
Superman: World of New Krypton #1-12
Superman: Last Stand of New Krypton #1-3
Superman: War of the Supermen #0-4
Superman: Secret Files 2009 #1
- Main character(s): Superman; Supergirl; Zor-El; Alura; Lois Lane; Jimmy Olsen; Cat Grant; Lana Lang; Sam Lane; Lex Luthor; Brainiac; Guardian; Martha Kent; Krypto

Creative team
- Writer(s): Geoff Johns; James Robinson; Sterling Gates
- Penciller(s): Gary Frank; Renato Guedes; Jamal Igle; Pete Woods; Pere Perez
- Inker(s): Jose Wilson Magalhaes; Jonathan Sibal; Pete Woods; Keith Champagne
- Letterer(s): Steve Wands; Rob Leigh; John J. Hill; Jared K. Fletcher
- Colorist(s): Hi-Fi Colour; Brad Anderson; David Baron; Nei Ruffino; David Curiel
- Editor: Matt Idelson
- Volume 1: ISBN 1-4012-2329-X
- Volume 2: ISBN 1401223192

"New Krypton" is a 2008–09 comic book story arc featuring character Superman, published by American company DC Comics; it was written by Geoff Johns, James Robinson and Sterling Gates, with art by Gary Frank, Alex Ross, Renato Guedes, Jamal Igle and Pete Woods. The arc is an inter-title crossover, published in Action Comics, Superman and Supergirl.

The story features Superman coming to terms with the death of his adoptive father while also dealing with 100,000 Kryptonians now living on Earth as a result of the Brainiac story arc. This story begins a planned "link" on Action Comics, Superman, and Supergirl as part of their collective plans for Superman and his cast of characters through 2008 and beyond. The events of this story lead directly into the 12-part series Superman: World of New Krypton.

== Publication history ==
In the months before Johns started his Brainiac arc, and James Robinson took over writing duties on Superman, both Johns and Robinson had made clear their plans for the Superman-related titles following those arcs for the rest of 2008 onto the end of 2010. The plan was to link the three Super-books (Action Comics, Superman, and Supergirl), allowing them to cross over more fluidly on a regular basis and also allowing the narratives to be tied together similar to a bi-weekly series.

According to Johns, the plan was to make readers want to get the Super-titles because they would not feel that "you HAVE to read, but that you WANT to read". Robinson also added that even though neither he nor Johns would be writing Supergirl, they made it clear that they were still the advisors to the book's next ongoing writer, Sterling Gates. Gates, coming onto the Supergirl title with issue #34, has stated his intention of working with Johns and Robinson:

What we hope to achieve is to make these three comics the most kick-ass books that DC puts out. The Superman legacy and the Superman books are so important, and the three of us are interested in pulling people into the Superman universe so hard that people look forward to picking up a Superman or Supergirl book every week.

== Summary ==
Following the events of the "Brainiac" story arc, the entire city of Kandor now resides near the Fortress of Solitude in the North Pole, populated by 100,000 Kryptonians.

Although distracted by the recent death of Jonathan Kent, Superman attempts to aid the Kryptonians in their assimilation with the rest of the Earth. Few Kryptonians seem interested in this, including the city's leaders, Zor-El and Alura, Supergirl's parents.

After the first televised meeting between the President of the United States and a delegation from Kandor is interrupted by a rampaging Doomsday, Zor-El and Alura form a task force determined to preemptively end any future threat to Kandor by capturing Superman's worst villains and trapping them in the Phantom Zone. However, when several human police officers refuse to hand over the Parasite, they are killed by the task force, enraging Superman.

At the same time, Lex Luthor, who has been recruited by General Sam Lane to halt the Kryptonian "invasion", gains control of Brainiac and unleashes his robot army from within the depths of the alien's spaceship, currently being held in Kandor. During the fight, Metallo and Reactron, who are working for Luthor and General Lane, are brought into Kandor as Trojan horses containing kryptonite. Reactron manages to kill Supergirl's father, Zor-El.

Alura's anger causes her to denounce humanity. Members of the Justice League and Justice Society arrive in Kandor, led by the Guardian demanding the city turn over those who murdered the police officers, and a large-scale battle erupts, with Superman in the middle. It only ends when Kryptonian scientists manage to use Brainiac's technology to lift Kandor off the Earth and grow an entirely new planet underneath it, called "New Krypton", on the other side of the Solar System, directly opposite the Earth, and therefore hidden by the Sun.

Alura tells Superman that he is not welcome on New Krypton, although Supergirl takes up residence there with her mother. In the end, Alura frees General Zod from the Phantom Zone to help her lead their people.

== New characters ==
New Krypton introduced several new super-powered characters to the Superman universe. These characters are modern versions of older and, up until recently, mostly unused heroes.

Nightwing and Flamebird

Nightwing and Flamebird first appeared in Superman's Fortress of Solitude guarding the Phantom Zone projector to prevent anyone loyal to General Zod from freeing the despot. Both Nightwing and Flamebird exhibit powers that are not inherent to normal Kryptonians: Flamebird shoots fireballs from her hand while Nightwing uses tactile telekinesis. Unlike previous portrayals, Flamebird is female and is older than the teenage, male Nightwing. Starting with issue #875, they are the starring characters of Action Comics.

The origin of Nightwing and Flamebird was revealed in Action Comics Annual #12.

Superwoman

The mysterious, masked Superwoman demonstrates apparent Kryptonian abilities. She makes an effort to comfort Supergirl following her father's death. Although her true identity is initially unknown, her costume is similar to the Kristin Wells version of Superwoman. At the end of the New Krypton arc, Superwoman murders Agent Liberty, after catching him spying on General Sam Lane and Lex Luthor, calling out "Intruder Alert" as she does so. She is later revealed to be working for General Lane.

Superwoman is the focus of the "Who is Superwoman?" arc in Supergirl. She is revealed to be Lucy Lane, Lois Lane's younger sister.

== Issue numbering ==
The story, New Krypton, was featured as a crossover between the monthly Superman, Action Comics, and Supergirl titles. Each issue was branded with a green pentagon badge indicating what part of the story it was. The numbering continued after the series conclusion, until reaching number 35 with Superman issue number 690. The numbering was restarted, and the badge was made red, for the Codename: Patriot and Superman: Last Stand of New Krypton storylines.

Rebadged with green badges:

0 – Superman's Pal, Jimmy Olsen Special #1 (set after Superman #680 but before Superman: New Krypton Special #1)
1 – New Krypton #1 (also included in Superman: Brainiac TPB)
2 – Superman #681
3 – Guardian Special #1
4 – Action Comics #871
5 – Supergirl #35
6 – Superman #682
7 – Action Comics #872
8 – Supergirl #36
9 – Superman #683
10 – Action Comics #873
11 – Supergirl #37 (no shield number on cover)
12 – Superman #684
13 – Action Comics #874
14 – Supergirl #38
15 – Superman #685 (no shield number on cover)
16 – World of New Krypton #1
17 – Action Comics #875
18 – Supergirl #39
19 – Superman #686
20 – World of New Krypton #2
21 – Action Comics #876
22 – Supergirl #40
23 – Superman #687
24 – World of New Krypton #3
25 – Action Comics #877
26 – Supergirl #41
27 – Superman #688
28 – World of New Krypton #4
29 – Action Comics #878
30 – Supergirl #42
31 – Superman #689
32 – World of New Krypton #5
33 - Action Comics Annual #12 (no shield number on cover)
34 – Action Comics #879
35 – Supergirl #43
36 - Supergirl Annual #1 (no shield number on cover)
37 – Superman #690

Rebadged with red badges:

1 — Superman Secret Files and Origins 2009
2 – World of New Krypton #6
3 – Action Comics #880
4 – Supergirl #44
5 – Superman #691
6 - Superman Annual #14
7 – Superman's Pal, Jimmy Olsen Special #2
8 – World of New Krypton #7
9 – Action Comics #881
10 – Supergirl #45
11 – Superman #692
12 – World of New Krypton #8
13 – Action Comics #882
14 – Supergirl #46
15 – Superman #693
16 – World of New Krypton #9
17 – Action Comics #883
18 – Supergirl #47
19 – Superman #694
20 – World of New Krypton #10
21 – Action Comics #884
22 – Supergirl #48
23 – Superman #695
24 – World of New Krypton #11
25 – Action Comics #885
26 – Supergirl #49
27 – Superman #696
28 – World of New Krypton #12
29 – Action Comics #886
30 – Supergirl #50
31 – Superman #697
32 – Adventure Comics #8
33 – Last Stand of New Krypton #1
34 – Action Comics #887
35 – Supergirl #51
36 – Superman #698
37 – Adventure Comics #9
38 – Last Stand of New Krypton #2
39 – Action Comics #888
40 – Adventure Comics #10
41 – Supergirl #52
42 – Superman #699
43 – Last Stand of New Krypton #3
44 – Action Comics #889
45 – Adventure Comics #11

War of the Supermen

0 - War of the Supermen #0 (FCBD)
1 - War of the Supermen #1
2 - War of the Supermen #2
3 - War of the Supermen #3
4 - War of the Supermen #4
5 - Superman #700 (aftermath)

== Collected editions ==
The storyline will be collected into a number of volumes:

- Volume 1: Birth (176 pages, hardcover, May 2009, ISBN 1-4012-2329-X)
- Volume 2 (160 pages, hardcover, September 2009, ISBN 1-4012-2319-2)

== Follow-up ==
A twelve-part maxi-series entitled Superman: World of New Krypton was produced from March 2009 to March 2010. The 12 issues run through the storylines of New Krypton and Codename: Patriot. That was in turn followed by Superman: Last Stand of New Krypton from March to April 2010 and finally concluded in the five-issue (#0 issue and #1-4) epic Superman: War of the Supermen in May 2010. All other title books were not distributed during the culmination event.
