= Superman: The Last Family of Krypton =

American comic book series

Publication information
- Publisher: DC Comics
- Format: Limited series
- Genre: Superhero
- Publication date: 2010
- No. of issues: 3
- Main character: Superman

Creative team
- Written by: Cary Bates
- Artist: Renato Arlem
- Letterer: Pat Brosseau
- Colorist: Allen Passalaqua

Superman: The Last Family of Krypton is a comic book limited series, published in 2010. It depicts what could have happened if Superman's parents also arrived on Earth.

== Plot ==
In this reality, Jor-El was able to save himself and his wife Lara and accompany their son Kal-El to Earth, where Jor-El sets up the corporation JorCorp while Lara establishes the self-help movement "Raology" based on the native religion of Krypton. Lara is willing to adapt to life on Earth, arranging for Kal-El to be discreetly adopted by the Kent family so that he can live a more normal life, and later has twin children, Bru-El and Valora, whose "stunted" genetics resulting from their birth in the unnatural environment of Earth mean that they only possess half of the superhuman potential of their brother. By contrast, Jor-El gradually becomes obsessed with scientific development above all else, even spending a large portion of his time in a chair that downloads information about Earth directly into his brain so that he can keep track of every possible development on Earth and thus prevent a similar disaster befalling his adopted home as happened on Krypton. Although his actions hinder human progress by keeping the people of Earth dependent on him, Jor-El argues that Earth only needs his family to protect them, even telling the Guardians of the Universe not to proceed with their plans to appoint a Green Lantern to Earth.

While attending a dinner in Gotham, Lara is able to save Thomas and Martha Wayne when she intercepts Joe Chill's attempted mugging, thus unknowingly preventing the creation of Batman. The Guardians also reveal to Jor-El that his drone watchers have prevented Oliver Queen training to become Green Arrow, and one of the twins' flights blocked the lightning that would have led to Barry Allen's transformation into the Flash, while Jor-El saving Abin Sur's life meant that Hal Jordan later died when a test flight went wrong. Lara eventually rejects Jor-El's desire to "micromanage" humanity, relocating to her own estate of "Lara-Land", where she uses red sun emitters to restrict her natural abilities and simply encourages spiritual growth while using Kryptonian technology to heal the injuries of any who are in need.

Jor-El hires a brilliant young scientist named Lex Luthor to work at JorCorp, but Luthor eventually plots to destroy Jor-El's reputation with the aid of his reprogrammed A.I. B, feeling that in contrast to Lara, who has fully assimilated into human society, Jor-El is nothing more than a megalomaniac with a god complex who would always undermine his accomplishments. After Luthor's plan turns Bru-El into a mindless kryptonite-powered superhuman, the young man nearly kills his father before Lara sacrifices herself to save her husband; Kal-El then defeats his brother after he expends too much of his kryptonite energy to defend himself. Recognising the flaws in his past actions, Jor-El steps back from the public eye, becoming a simple wanderer of Earth and other planets, while allowing Kal-El to become Earth's protector, Superman.

== Reception ==
The comic received a mostly positive reception from critics.
