= Non (character) =

- Non in Action Comics Annual #10 (April 2007), art by Art Adams.

Publication information
- Publisher: DC Comics
- First appearance: Film: Superman: The Movie (1978); Comics: Action Comics #845 (January 2007)
- Created by: Mario Puzo

In-story information
- Species: Kryptonian
- Place of origin: Krypton
- Partnerships: General Zod; Ursa; Lor-Zod
- Abilities: See list: Superhuman strength, stamina, endurance, speed, agility, reflexes, longevity, and hearing; Solar radiation absorption; Enhanced vision; EM spectrum vision; Infra-red vision; Microscopic vision; Telescopic vision; X-ray vision; Invulnerability; Ice and wind breath; Heat vision; Flight

Non is a supervillain appearing in American comic books published by DC Comics. He first appeared in the 1978 film Superman, portrayed by Jack O'Halloran, and first appeared in comics in Action Comics #845 (January 2007). An accomplice of General Zod and an adversary of the superhero Superman, he is typically depicted as having been imprisoned in the Phantom Zone along with Zod and Ursa, among whom he is portrayed as the strong and silent muscle.

In television, the character was portrayed by Chris Vance in the Arrowverse series Supergirl.

== Character biography ==
=== Films ===
First appearing in Superman, Non is incapable of speech and considered by Jor-El as "a mindless aberration, whose only means of expression are wanton violence and destruction". Non, General Zod, and Ursa are put on trial for mounting a failed coup against the Kryptonian government, found guilty, and sentenced to life imprisonment in the Phantom Zone.

In Superman II, after Superman throws a hydrogen bomb into Earth's orbit, he unknowingly shatters the Phantom Zone, allowing Non, Zod, and Ursa to escape. Upon gaining powers from Earth's yellow sun, they travel to the White House to force the President to submit to them. In the process, they encounter Lex Luthor, who forms an alliance with the trio to help them find Superman in exchange for control of Australia. Following several battles between Superman and Zod's forces, he eventually tricks them into coming to the Fortress of Solitude and bathing it in red sunlight to weaken the trio before sending the criminals to the Fortress' depths with Lois Lane's help. In a deleted scene, Zod's forces are arrested by human authorities. In Superman II: The Richard Donner Cut, it is revealed that Superman went back in time to make sure that Zod's group remained in the Phantom Zone.

=== Comics ===
In October 2006, film director Richard Donner, noted for his work on the first two Superman films, began to write Action Comics in collaboration with Geoff Johns. After an unidentified Kryptonian boy crash lands in Metropolis and is taken in by Lois Lane and Clark Kent, he is followed by three more Kryptonians in identical vessels: General Zod and Ursa (who claim the boy as theirs) as well as Non. In these comics, Non is portrayed as being more bulky than in the Superman II movie, but maintaining the same personality.

Non was previously a friend to Jor-El, as well as a member of the Kryptonian Council, while they discovered Krypton's instability. After leading a separatist movement, Non was abducted by the Science Council and lobotomized, leading to his current status as a minimally-verbal brute. Although now a highly aggressive and mentally lacking enforcer for Zod, Non retains a degree of his original mind, particularly when dealing with young children. After Zod and Ursa give birth to their son (who would later become known as Christopher Kent), Non behaved not only docile but caring towards Chris during his early childhood.

After being re-imprisoned in the Phantom Zone by Superman and Chris, Zod, Ursa, and Non once again return to the Prison. Chris takes secret refuge in the prison, with only Non aware of him. Non continued to behave as a protective caretaker towards Chris, bringing him food and hiding him from his parents. When Chris's parents discover him, Non and Thara Ak-Var arrive to rescue him.

Non is punished for this act and made an aspirant in the Kryptonian military under lieutenant Asha Del-Nar, in a unit designated Red Shard. Superman is placed into the Military Guild, named Commander of the Red Shard unit. Superman finds the other Aspirants are forcing Non to fight a wild animal as a hazing, which he stops. Since this, he has been loyal to Kal-El. When trying to round up some wild thought-beasts, Non sees himself holding a young girl.

== Powers and abilities ==
Non possesses the average abilities of a Kryptonian, including superhuman strength, speed, flight, super-vision, and super-hearing, and vulnerabilities to Kryptonite and red sun radiation. Furthermore, his low intelligence can be exploited.

== In other media ==
=== Television ===
- Non appears in Supergirl, portrayed by Chris Vance. This version is the husband and second-in-command of Astra In-Ze and uncle of Supergirl. Years prior to the series and Krypton's destruction, Non and Astra led a separatist movement on Krypton before being imprisoned in the Phantom Zone via the maximum security prison Fort Rozz. After Supergirl's pod was lost in the Phantom Zone and crash-landed on Earth, it took Fort Rozz with it, allowing Indigo to instigate a prison break and leading to Astra's forces undergoing a crusade to save Earth from humanity, only to be hunted by the Department of Extranormal Operations (DEO). When Supergirl grows up and joins the DEO to help re-apprehend the escapees, Non pressures Astra to accelerate her plans until she is killed by Alex Danvers. In response, Non takes command of her remaining forces, joins forces with Indigo, and sets out to do Astra's bidding by using Project Myriad, a Kryptonian program that enables mass mind control and negates hopeful thoughts, to destroy the craniums of every human on Earth, only to be foiled by Supergirl and Martian Manhunter.
- Non appears in the DC Super Hero Girls two-part episode "#DCSuperHeroBoys". This version was imprisoned in the Phantom Zone by Alura Zor-El.
- Non appears in Young Justice: Phantoms.

=== Film ===
Non makes a non-speaking appearance in Scooby-Doo! and Krypto, Too!.

=== Video games ===
- Non, alongside General Zod and Ursa, appears as the collective final boss of Superman (1987).
- Non appears in DC Universe Online.
- Non appears as a support card in the mobile version of Injustice: Gods Among Us.
- Non appears as a character summon in Scribblenauts Unmasked: A DC Comics Adventure.
- Non makes a cameo appearance in Sub-Zero's ending in Injustice 2.
