= Lara (DC Comics) =

Fictional character from DC Comics

- Lara Lor-Van as depicted on the cover of Superboy #74 (July 1959). Art by Curt Swan.

Publication information
- Publisher: DC Comics
- First appearance: Superman comic strip (January 16, 1939)
- Created by: Jerry Siegel; Joe Shuster

In-story information
- Species: Kryptonian
- Place of origin: Krypton
- Notable aliases: Lora (Golden Age/Earth-Two version); Lara Sul-Van (Superman: The Animated Series)
- Abilities: Genius-level intellect; Expertise in aerospace engineering and technology; Skilled martial artist and hand-to-hand combatant

Lara Lor-Van is a fictional character appearing in American comic books published by DC Comics. Created by writer Jerry Siegel and artist Joe Shuster, Lara first appeared in the Superman newspaper comic strip in 1939. Lara is the biological mother of Superman, and the wife of scientist Jor-El. Lara Lor-Van is Lara's full maiden name, as "Lor-Van" is the name of Lara's father. Most depictions of Kryptonian culture show that Kryptonian women use their father's full name as their last names before marriage. After marriage, they usually are known simply by their first names, though various versions show they use their husband's full name or last name as their married last name.

Lara's role in the Superman mythos has varied over the years, with her treatment and emphasis often depending on the decade in which she was written. Golden Age and early Silver Age stories treated Lara in a lesser role compared to her husband. However, stories from the 1970s onwards depict Lara in more prominent roles; one such example is the 2004 miniseries Superman: Birthright. A defining feature of the Fortress of Solitude is a commemorative statue of Superman's biological parents, Jor-El and Lara, supporting a globe of Krypton.

Susannah York portrays Lara in the 1978 film Superman: The Movie, the 1980 film Superman II, and the 1987 film Superman IV: The Quest for Peace. Ayelet Zurer portrayed Lara in the 2013 film Man of Steel, which is set in the DC Extended Universe. Angela Sarafyan portrayed Lara in the DC Universe (DCU) film Superman. Mariana Klaveno portrayed the character in the television series Superman & Lois.

== Fictional character biography ==
=== Golden and Silver Age versions ===
Lara, Jor-El, and Superman. From the cover of Superman #141 (November 1960). Art by Curt Swan.

Lara's first appearance was in the Superman newspaper comic strip on January 16, 1939, where she was named Lora. Her first comic book appearance (after being mentioned in the 1942 text novel The Adventures of Superman by George Lowther, where she was named "Lara" for the first time) was in More Fun Comics #101 in January–February 1945. A 1948 retelling of Superman's origin story subsequently delved into detail about Lara, though her more familiar Silver Age aspects were established starting in the late 1950s and over the next several decades.

After the establishment of DC's multiverse in the early 1960s, the Golden Age version of Superman's mother was stated as having been named "Lora", and lived on the Krypton of Earth-Two. The Silver Age Lara, meanwhile, lived on the Krypton of Earth-One.

A definitive synopsis of the Silver Age Lara's life (summarizing the various stories revealing her history) was published in the 1979 miniseries The World of Krypton (not to be confused with the post-Crisis on Infinite Earths late 1980s comic special of the same name).

As summarized in The World of Krypton and in various other stories, Lara was a promising astronaut in Krypton's space program before it was grounded after Jax-Ur destroyed Krypton's moon Wegthor. Eventually, Lara met scientist Jor-El, with the two having several adventures together before getting married, such as a time-traveling Lois Lane attempting to seduce Jor-El after failing to marry their son in the future. Some time later, Lara gave birth to the couple's only child, Kal-El.

When Krypton was about to explode, Lara and Jor-El placed their infant son into an escape rocket built by Jor-El. In most retellings, Jor-El wanted Lara to accompany their son to Earth, but Lara refused, saying their son would have a better chance of reaching Earth without her extra weight. Kal-El's spaceship then took off as Lara and Jor-El were killed in Krypton's explosion.

=== Modern Age versions ===
After the 1985-1986 miniseries Crisis on Infinite Earths and John Byrne's 1986 miniseries The Man of Steel rewrote Superman's origins, details about Lara's background and character were changed. Under Byrne's version, Lara inhabited a cold, emotionally sterile Krypton where even bodily contact was forbidden. Lara's grandmother, Lady Nara, and Seyg-El, Jor-El's father, were the ones who arranged the union between them – so that they might have a child who would fill an opening in the planet's Register of Citizens when another Kryptonian died a rare and untimely death. Jor-El, however, was considered a "throwback" for actually expressing emotions toward his wife Lara, and for his favoring the less sterilized days of past Kryptonian eras. In this version of the mythos, Lara was a librarian and historian of high rank and thought it horrifying that Kal-El would be sent to a "primitive" planet such as Earth. In one story, the adult Kal (now Superman) is transported to the past and encounters his parents moments before Krypton's destruction. Lara is disgusted by what she sees and tells Kal not to approach her, finding him "repellent", even as she is ashamed of her feelings.

In the 2004 Superman miniseries Superman: Birthright, Lara, along with Krypton and Jor-El, more or less again became their Silver Age versions, though with updated touches. In this version, Lara is treated as a fully equal partner to Jor-El in constructing Kal-El's spacecraft and in designing various key components.

In the 2009 series Superman: Secret Origin by Geoff Johns, Superman is first introduced to his birth mother in his teens by the spaceship that brought him to the Earth as a baby. She is introduced to Kal-El by a hologram of Jor-El as his mother. This moment shocks Superman and brings tears to Martha Kent's eyes.

Also in 2009, Lara's own family background is described. Lara Lor-Van is born into the Labor Guild, whose members are not physically abused but have no say in the choices of their lives and who, unlike the members of other guilds, cannot change guilds. Lara became a member of her husband's Science Guild when she married him and was thereby granted all the freedoms granted to other Science Guild members. A member of Krypton's Military Guild describes this as being "raised up."

==== The New 52 ====
In September 2011, The New 52 rebooted DC's continuity. In this new timeline, Lara is a member of Krypton's military forces. One of the most talented students on the Military Academy, Lara is both a skilled fighter and a bright scientist.

Lara appears in the "Krypton Returns" storyline, where her maiden name is stated to be Lara Van-El.

== Other versions ==
- An alternate universe version of Lara appears in Superman Family Adventures. This version survived Krypton's destruction by escaping into the Phantom Zone. She is eventually freed by her son and accepted into the Superman family.
- An alternate universe version of Lara appears in Superman: The Last Family of Krypton. This version survived Krypton's destruction and accompanied Jor-El and Kal-El to Earth, where Jor-El sets up the corporation JorCorp while Lara establishes the self-help movement 'Raology'. More open to adapting on Earth, she arranges for Kal-El to be adopted by the Kents so that he can live a more normal life, and later has twin children, Bru-El and Valora, who possess diminished powers due to their 'stunted' genetics. Lex Luthor later transforms Bru-El into a kryptonite-powered superhuman who kills Lara.
- An alternate universe version of Lara appears in Superman Adventures. This version is a resident of a Kryptonian city that survived Krypton's destruction. However, after spending years drifting in space, Lara has become bitter and egotistical, abducting her universe's Superman and Supergirl and brainwashing them into being dedicated soldiers. When the 'prime' Superman arrives in this world, he joins forces with Jor-El and some of his enemies to stop Lara, at which point Jor-El destroys the city to send Superman home.
- An alternate universe version of Lara appears in Absolute Superman. This version wanted to be an astronaut as a child, but was blacklisted from the Science League for mildly criticizing their lack of funding interstellar exploration when she was nine. She becomes an engineer. When her husband Jor-El discovers the planet is dying, she creates nanotech sunstone suits that function as starships to get themselves, their son Kal-El, and as many people as they can off-planet. When Jor-El is captured by the Science League, she dons the suit and breaks him out. When their ship takes off as the planet is exploding, it is destroyed by a flying piece of rubble, splitting everyone up into smaller ships. While Kal-El was able to escape the planet's destruction, it is unclear if Lara and Jor-El survived.

== In other media ==
=== Television ===
==== Animation ====
Lara (left) as depicted in Superman: The Animated Series.

- Lara appears in the Adventures of Superman pilot episode "Superman on Earth", portrayed by Aline Towne.
- Lara appears in a flashback in the Super Friends episode "The Planet Splitter".
- Lara appears in the Challenge of the Superfriends episode "Secret Origins of the Super Friends".
- Lara appears in the Superman: The Animated Series pilot episode "The Last Son of Krypton", voiced by Finola Hughes. This version is depicted with elements of her Silver Age and Modern Age depictions, being headstrong and an equal partner to Jor-El.
- Lara appears in the Pinky and the Brain episode "Two Mice and a Baby", voiced by Tress MacNeille.
- Lara makes a cameo appearance in the Dilbert episode "The Delivery".
- Lara makes a cameo appearance in the Justice League episode "Twilight".
- Lara appears in the Robot Chicken episode "Especially the Animal Keith Crofford!", voiced by Vanessa Hudgens.
- A statue of Lara appears in Young Justice.
- Lara appears in My Adventures with Superman, voiced by Rhea Seehorn.This version she died with Jor-El in the destruction of their home planet by Brainiac, and appeared in Clark's vision given by Jor-El.
- A statue of Lara appears in the Harley Quinn episode "The Big Apricot".

==== Live-action ====
- Lara appears in Superboy, portrayed by Britt Ekland.
- Lara makes a non-speaking appearance in a flashback in the Lois & Clark: The New Adventures of Superman episode "Foundling", portrayed by Eliza Roberts.
- Lara appears in Smallville, portrayed by Helen Slater.
- Lara appears in the pilot episode of Supergirl, portrayed by Ana Franchesca Rousseau.
- Lara appears in Superman & Lois, portrayed by Mariana Klaveno. This version previously fathered Tal-Rho with a Kryptonian named Zeta-Rho. Additionally, an A.I. based on her was developed and stored at Tal-Rho's lair before it was relocated to Superman's new Fortress of Solitude.
  - Additionally, a Bizarro World incarnation appears in the episode "Bizarros in a Bizarro World".

=== Film ===
==== Live-action ====
- Lara appears in Superman (1948), portrayed by Luana Walters.
- Lara appears in Atom Man vs. Superman, portrayed again by Luana Walters.
- Lara appears in Richard Donner's Superman films Superman (1978), Superman II (1980), and Superman IV: The Quest for Peace (1987), portrayed by Susannah York.
- Lara appears in Man of Steel, portrayed by Ayelet Zurer. Julia Ormond and Connie Nielsen were considered for the role before Zurer was cast.
- Lara appears in Superman (2025), portrayed by Angela Sarafyan. This version sent Kal-El to Earth to conquer it in addition to surviving Krypton's destruction.

==== Animation ====
- Lara appears in a flashback in All-Star Superman.
- An alternate universe version of Lara appears in Justice League: Gods and Monsters, voiced by Lauren Tom.
- Lara makes a non-speaking appearance in Teen Titans Go! To the Movies.
- Lara makes a non-speaking appearance in Superman: Man of Tomorrow.
- Lara appears in Batman and Superman: Battle of the Super Sons, voiced by Myrna Velasco.
- Lara appears in DC League of Super-Pets, voiced by Lena Headey.

=== Video games ===
- Lara appears as a character summon in Scribblenauts Unmasked: A DC Comics Adventure.
- The Man of Steel incarnation of Lara appears as a playable character in Lego Batman 3: Beyond Gotham.
- Lara makes a non-speaking appearance in Injustice 2.

=== Miscellaneous ===
Lara appears in The Adventures of Superman, voiced by Agnes Moorehead.
