= Ursa (DC Comics) =

Fictional character of the DC Universe

- Ursa in Action Comics Annual #10 (April 2007), art by Rags Morales.

Publication information
- Publisher: DC Comics
- First appearance: Film: Superman (1978); Comics: Alternate version: JSA Classified #3 (November 2005); Canonical version: Action Comics #845 (January 2007)
- Created by: Mario Puzo

In-story information
- Species: Kryptonian
- Place of origin: Krypton
- Team affiliations: Kryptonian Military Guild
- Partnerships: General Zod; Non
- Notable aliases: She-Devil
- Abilities: See list: Superhuman strength, stamina, endurance, speed, agility, reflexes, intelligence, longevity, and hearing; Solar radiation absorption; Enhanced vision; EM spectrum vision; Infra-red vision; Microscopic vision; Telescopic vision; X-ray vision; Invulnerability; Ice and wind breath; Heat vision; Flight; Military training

Ursa is a supervillain appearing in American comic books published by DC Comics. She first appeared in the 1978 film Superman: The Movie portrayed by actress Sarah Douglas. The character made her comic book debut in Action Comics #845 (January 2007). An adversary of the superhero Superman and accomplice of General Zod, she is typically depicted as having been imprisoned in the Phantom Zone along with Zod and Non.

== Fictional character biography ==
=== Film ===
First appearing in Superman (1978), she, General Zod, and Non are put on trial following a failed coup against the Kryptonian government, found guilty, and sentenced to life imprisonment in the Phantom Zone. In particular, according to the prosecutor, Jor-El, her "perversions and unreasoning hatred of all mankind have threatened even the children of the planet Krypton", with Zod and Non being the only exceptions.

In the theatrical cut of Superman II, Ursa's misandry remains intact, though her character is written to be softer. Additionally, Jor-El's speech is rewritten to imply that she has feelings for Zod. In the Richard Donner cut, she is portrayed as being vicious, cruel, and willing to kill as many men as she can. Ursa does not display affection for Zod, only remaining aligned with him because of their common goals. In both versions of the film, she displays a penchant for collecting and wearing symbols and badges from the law enforcement and military officers she kills. After Superman throws a powerful explosive (a hydrogen bomb in the theatrical cut and a nuclear missile in the Donner cut) into Earth's orbit, he inadvertently shatters the Phantom Zone, allowing Ursa, Zod, and Non to escape. Upon gaining powers from Earth's yellow sun, the trio head to Earth and force the President of the United States to surrender to them before forming an alliance with Lex Luthor to seek out Superman. Following several battles, Superman tricks Zod's forces into coming to the Fortress of Solitude, which he later bathes in red light to remove their powers. In the theatrical cut, Superman and Lois Lane subsequently send the trio down into the Fortress' depths, though a deleted scene depicts Zod's forces being arrested by human authorities. In the Donner cut, Superman travels back in time to ensure Zod's forces are re-imprisoned in the Phantom Zone.

=== Comics ===
Until 2006, the character of Ursa never appeared in the Superman comic books, but a similar character, named Faora, made several appearances in pre-Crisis Superman comics. Faora was a Phantom Zone villain who first appeared in Action Comics #471 (May 1977), Faora was introduced in the comics while the films were in production. Like Ursa, Faora hates men, with her being imprisoned in the Phantom Zone for killing 23 men in a concentration camp.

In JSA Classified #3, Power Girl (who was unsure about her true origins, at the time) was confronted by an escaped prisoner, from the Phantom Zone. He claimed that Power Girl's true identity is Ursa, who had escaped the Zone with their help and promised to help the others escape. However, the prisoner was later revealed to be an illusion created by Psycho-Pirate.

Action Comics #845 (January 2007), the second part of the "Last Son" arc by Geoff Johns and Richard Donner, introduced Ursa to the Superman comic book canon. This version of her contains elements similar to the originally released version of Superman II, where she is in love with Zod. Zod and Ursa are the parents of Lor-Zod, who was adopted by Superman and Lois Lane and named Chris Kent.

Action Comics Annual #10 explores the backstory of the comic version of Ursa similar to her film counterpart. Lover of General Zod, and part of the Kryptonian guard, she believed that Non and Jor-El were right about Krypton's final fate, and sought to rebel against the Council. When Non was kidnapped, lobotomized and turned into a brute with minimal intelligence and unable to speak, Zod and Ursa snapped, instigating open rebellion, while Jor-El surrendered to the Council, eventually using the Phantom Zone projector upon the trio during the trial seen in the movie. Ursa stayed loyal to Zod, even in their "exile", and believing that Jor-El should have been able to save Krypton, or at least his lineage, agreed with Zod in pursuing and taking vengeance over the House of El.

Ursa is reintroduced following The New 52 and DC Rebirth, which take place in a new continuity. In the series Kneel Before Zod, Ursa is killed in battle with Khund pirates. Zod manages to resurrect Ursa using a Kryptonian healing matrix, but she kills him, disagreeing with his plans.

== Powers and abilities ==
As a Kryptonian, Ursa derives her superhuman abilities from the yellow sun of Earth's solar system. Her basic abilities are high levels of superhuman strength, superhuman speed and superhuman stamina sufficient to bend steel in her bare hands, overpower a locomotive, outrun a speeding bullet and leap over a tall building in a single bound as well as heightened senses of hearing and sight including X-ray vision as well as telescopic and microscopic visions; virtual invulnerability; accelerated healing; longevity; heat vision; powerful freezing breath; and flight. Being female, her power levels are more akin to Supergirl and Wonder Woman.

Beyond just her superhuman strength and experienced hand-to-hand combat skills, Ursa is a ruthless killer who will do anything immoral to achieve her ends. She is fiercely loyal to General Zod and is willing to fight and die for his loyalty. Ursa is also a misandrist with an extreme sociopathic hatred of males, the only apparent exceptions being General Zod and her Phantom Zone cohorts. This sentiment seems to extend to a lesser degree to her own son, Lor-Zod, as she willingly and gleefully stood by while Zod violently and physically abused the young boy.

Like all Kryptonians, Ursa is vulnerable to Kryptonite and red solar radiation. Her virtual invulnerability does not provide protection from mind control or magic and can be overpowered and cause her to experience significant and even fatal injuries with significant force such as that of several atomic explosions or strikes from an opponent with superior strength and durability such as Doomsday. Her superhuman strength is inferior to the likes of Doomsday and her superhuman speed is inferior to speedsters like the Flash. Her superhuman strength is limited due to her natural limits even while within the empowering light of the sun.

== In other media ==
=== Television ===
- Ursa appears in the Superman (1988) episode "The Hunter", voiced by Ginny McSwain.
- Ursa makes a non-speaking cameo appearance in the Legion of Super Heroes episode "Phantoms" as an inmate of the Phantom Zone.
- Ursa appears in the DC Super Hero Girls episode "#DCSuperHeroBoys", voiced by Tara Strong. This version was sent to the Phantom Zone by Alura Zor-El.
- Ursa Zod appears in Young Justice, voiced by Vanessa Marshall. This version became the Emerald Empress after her son Lor-Zod stole the Emerald Eye of Ekron.

=== Film ===
Ursa makes a non-speaking appearance in Scooby-Doo! and Krypto, Too!.

=== Video games ===
- Ursa, alongside General Zod and Non, appears as the collective final boss of Superman (1987).
- Ursa appears in DC Universe Online, voiced by Adriene Mishler.
- Ursa appears as a support card in the mobile version of Injustice: Gods Among Us.
- Ursa appears as a character summon in Scribblenauts Unmasked: A DC Comics Adventure.
- Ursa makes a cameo appearance in Sub-Zero's ending in Injustice 2.
