= Zor-El =

Fictional character in the DC Comics Universe

Publication information
- Publisher: DC Comics
- First appearance: Action Comics #252 (May 1959)
- Created by: Otto Binder; Al Plastino

In-story information
- Alter ego: Cyborg Superman
- Species: Kryptonian cyborg
- Place of origin: Krypton
- Team affiliations: Black Lantern Corps
- Notable aliases: Zor-L
- Abilities: Cybernetic implants; (Under a yellow sun): Kryptonian power set

Zor-El is a fictional character appearing in American comic books published by DC Comics. A Kryptonian, he is the younger brother of Jor-El, husband of Alura, father of Supergirl, and paternal uncle of Superman.

Traditional depictions of Zor-El in Golden Age and Silver Age DC Comics stories portrayed him as a benevolent scientist concerned for his daughter Kara, acting similarly to his older brother Jor-El in sending his child to safety on Earth. In the mid-2000s, DC experimented with different characterizations of Zor-El, even briefly casting him as a mad scientist with a grudge against his brother. A similar depiction was used when the character was adapted for television in the series Smallville. In 2010s stories following DC's The New 52 reboot, Zor-El has been an antagonist for Supergirl and Superman, having been transformed into the villain Cyborg Superman by Brainiac.

Zor-El was portrayed by Simon Ward in the film Supergirl (1984), and is portrayed by David Krumholtz in the DC Universe film Supergirl (2026). Christopher Heyerdahl portrayed a villainous version in the TV series Smallville. Robert Gant portrayed the character in the Arrowverse television series Supergirl in the first two seasons, and Jason Behr portrayed him in the sixth season.

== Publication history ==
Zor-El first appeared in Action Comics #252 (May 1959) and was created by Otto Binder and Al Plastino.

== Fictional character biography ==
=== Pre-Crisis ===
In pre-Crisis continuity, Zor-El was a climatographer on Krypton, and one of the only scientists to believe his brother Jor-El's predictions about the impending destruction of Krypton. When the planet exploded, Argo City was blown safely into space with a life-giving bubble of air around it; a later version of the story has the city saved by weather dome that Zor-El had constructed. The explosion turns the ground beneath Argo into kryptonite, but Zor-El and the other survivors covered the surface with sheets of lead. The Kryptonians manage to keep alive for many years, and Kara was born a short time after the destruction of Krypton. Some time later, a meteor storm damages the lead sheeting, exposing the survivors to kryptonite radiation. Zor-El manages to build a rocket, with which he sends Kara to Earth.

It was later revealed to Supergirl that her parents had teleported away into the Survival Zone (similar to the Phantom Zone) during Argo's final moments. Supergirl was able to rescue them, and Zor-El and Alura went on to live in Kandor. When the bottle city was enlarged, Zor-El and Alura resettled on New Krypton/Rokyn.

==== Earth-Two ====
In the alternate universe of Earth-Two, Zor-L and Allura did not survive Krypton's destruction. This Zor-L was an expert in psychology and created a virtual reality chamber for Kara inside her spacecraft. As she aged inside the rocket on her way to Earth-Two, she experienced the type of life she would have had on Krypton. This version of Zor-L lived in Kandor and not Argo City.

=== Post-Crisis and Zero Hour (Birthright) and Infinite Crisis timelines ===
Zor-El (Birthright timeline version) as he appears in Supergirl (vol. 5) #5 (March 2006 DC Comics). Art by Ian Churchill.

In "The Supergirl from Krypton" story-arc in Superman/Batman #8-13 (May–October 2004), Zor-El rocketed his daughter away from Krypton before Kal-El left. It was expected that she would reach Earth first and could help raise Kal from his infancy. However, she stayed in stasis and her ship did not reach Earth until years later, so the infant she expected to help raise was a grown man when she arrived still in her teens.

In the Supergirl series, new information on Zor-El's history and relations are crucial with Zor-El was featured in issue #16 as he appeared as an apparition and explained what truly happened to Kara, and why she was sent to Earth to kill Kal-El, in a dream sequence. Zor-El was against the use of the Phantom Zone as a prison because he felt that it would become abused, since no blood was shed, it became a clean way to deal with criminals. In the Argo City area he lived in, he was a very trusted scientist like his brother Jor-El. He fought with Jor-El over the use of the Phantom Zone and tried to stop him from supporting it.

In Action Comics #869 it is revealed the Zor-El saved Argo City from Krypton's destruction by engineering a protective dome with his wife Alura. However, Brainiac, who was the culprit for Krypton's explosion, returned to finish the job. He merged Argo with the city of Kandor and killed those he considered to be duplicate information. Superman finds the city in Brainiac's ship. Zor-El and Alura are able to make contact with Kal-El to enquire about their daughter. He was later murdered by Reactron.

In Blackest Night crossover, Zor-El is reanimated as a member of the Black Lantern Corps. The scientists of New Krypton manage to place a forcefield composed of a counter-energy to the black ring's power source around the planet, cutting off Zor-El's right hand and preventing him from continuing his attack.

=== The New 52 ===
Zor-El as Cyborg Superman on the cover of Action Comics (vol. 2) #23.1 (November 2013 DC Comics). Art by Aaron Kuder.

In The New 52 continuity reboot, Zor-El is Jor-El’s older brother. In spite of his jealousy and resentment, Zor-El listened when Jor-El claimed Krypton was doomed. He built a dome around Argo City and a space rocket to send Kara to Earth in case Argo's force-field failed. However, Zor-El did not warn his wife and daughter about his plans, and minutes before the explosion, Zor-El blasted Kara into space. Without a way to sustain themselves, the city's seven million inhabitants ended up dying. Zor-El sent a distress signal, but less than a dozen people remained alive when Brainiac found the city. Brainiac turned Zor-El into a cyborg, erased his memory, and reprogrammed him to serve him.

Zor-El is obsessed with achieving perfection and getting his lost memories back. Zor-El met and fought Supergirl - who gave him the "Cyborg Superman" moniker - several times. Zor-El eventually rebels against Brainiac, but is defeated and left for dead. His systems reboot, restoring his memory in the process. Zor-El is appalled at what he had become and what he had done and becomes obsessed with bringing Argo City back and recreating Krypton, convincing himself it was for his daughter's sake. Zor-El is taken to Dr. Veritas's lab, where he is placed in a pod as his cybernetic implants are removed.

Indigo nearly kills Supergirl, leading Zor-El to attack Indigo. Zor-El is captured by the Department of Extranormal Operations, taken to a clandestine base and locked up. Zor-El is visited by Mister Oz, who kills him by activating the red plasma failsafe in his containment tank, leaving him to drown.

== Powers and abilities ==
Zor-El has all the powers and weaknesses of a Kryptonian from exposure to Earth's yellow sunlight. As a cyborg, he possesses enhanced physical abilities and can transform his right arm into various weapons.

== In other media ==
=== Television ===
- Zor-El appears in the Super Friends episode "The Krypton Syndrome".
- Zor-El appears in Smallville, portrayed by Christopher Heyerdahl. This version was a rival of Jor-El who assisted Major Zod in destroying Krypton and was killed in the process. A clone of Zor-El would later be created on Earth and become an enemy of Clark Kent.
- Zor-El appears in Supergirl (2015), portrayed by Robert Gant in the first and second seasons and Jason Behr in the sixth. This version died saving Argo City from the destruction of Krypton and created the Medusa virus bioweapon. Due to changes made to the multiverse following "Crisis on Infinite Earths", Zor-El escaped Krypton by entering the Phantom Zone, which Supergirl rescues him from.
- Zor-El makes a non-speaking appearance in the Young Justice episode "Encounter Upon the Razor's Edge!".
- Zor-El makes non-speaking cameo appearances in My Adventures with Superman.

=== Film ===
- Zor-El appears in Supergirl (1984), portrayed by Simon Ward. This version is a survivor from Krypton living in Argo City, in the Phantom Zone.
- Zor-El makes a non-speaking cameo appearance in a flashback in Superman/Batman: Apocalypse.
- Zor-El appears in Superman: Unbound, voiced by Stephen Root.This version is alive alongside Alura in the city of Kandor, imprisoned by Brainiac.
- Zor-El appears in DC Super Hero Girls: Hero of the Year, voiced by Tom Kenny.
- Zor-El appears in Supergirl (2026), portrayed by David Krumholtz.This version is about a scientist who, along with his wife Alura, evacuates to Argo City with many Kryptonians during the destruction of the planet Krypton. After seeing his brother Jor-El send his infant son Kal-El to Earth, he activates a force field system that separates a fragment containing the city from the planet, preventing its destruction when its core explodes. Following the birth of his daughter Kara, Zor-El discovers that the ground of Argo City has been poisoned by kryptonite, killing the population, including Alura. Zor-El succumbs after sending Kara and her dog Krypto to Earth to reunite with Kal-El.

=== Miscellaneous ===
Zor-El appears in Kevin J. Anderson's novel The Last Days of Krypton.
