= Kandor (comics) =

Bottled city of the fictional planet Krypton in the DC Universe

- Superman location
- First appearance: Action Comics #242 (July 1958)
- Created by: Otto Binder; Al Plastino
- Genre: Superhero comics

In-universe information
- Type: City
- Race: Kryptonians
- Locations: Krypton (destroyed); Fortress of Solitude
- Publisher: DC Comics

Kandor (commonly known as the Bottle City of Kandor) is a fictional city spared from the doomed world of Krypton in American comic books published by DC Comics, most commonly in Superman titles. Before Krypton exploded, the futuristic city was captured by the supervillain Brainiac, miniaturized by his shrinking ray and placed inside a glass bell jar. Defeating Brainiac and taking possession of the jar, Superman brings the city to his Arctic hideout, the Fortress of Solitude, and spends many years attempting to restore it to normal size.

== Publication history ==
The city first appeared in the story "The Super-Duel in Space", published in Action Comics #242 (July 1958), written by Otto Binder and drawn by Al Plastino during the period known as the Silver Age of Comic Books. This was part of editor Mort Weisinger's desire to build a wider canvas of supporting characters and locations for the various Superman titles, creating more opportunities for new stories to emerge. The miniature city allowed writers to explore Kryptonian culture, which had previously been an offscreen preface to the series. The concept was explored in depth over the next ten years, as the readers became fascinated with the bottled city and its glimpses of Kryptonian life.

The concept helped to humanize the god-like Superman and enrich his characterization. In Superman: The Complete History, Les Daniels observed that "showing Superman so much at home in the bottle emphasized the extent to which he was as much an alien as an American". In Superman: The High-Flying History of America's Most Enduring Hero, Larry Tye said that Kandor "made clear that even Superman couldn't get everything he wanted, since there was nothing he wanted more than to restore the Kandorians to their rightful size".

In their book Supergods, writer Grant Morrison explained the unique symbolism that the Bottle City represents:

This living diorama, this ant colony of real people, had great appeal for children, adding to the childlike nature of this era's Superman. In Kandor, lost memories were preserved under glass, and Superman could go there, in private, to experience a world he left behind. Kandor was every snow globe and music box that stood for every bittersweet memory in every movie there would ever be. Kandor was the tinkling voice of a lost world, a past that might have been, unreachable. Kandor was survivor's guilt endowed with new meaning.

The first Brainiac/Kandor comic book story in Action Comics #242 (July 1958) was based on a story arc in the Superman comic strip from April through August 1958. In the comic strip story, Superman's foe was named Romado, who traveled the cosmos with his pet white monkey Koko, shrinking major cities and keeping them in glass jars. The strip's Kryptonian bottled city was named Dur-El-Va. This cross-continuity conflict was not unprecedented; in 1958 and '59, editor Mort Weisinger used the comic strip to prototype a number of concepts that he planned to introduce in the book, including Bizarro and red Kryptonite.

Following Kandor's introduction in the comic books, the Bottle City inspired a number of plots involving both regular characters entering the jar to visit Kandor, as well as Kandorians leaving the jar to interact with the human world. Superman became a regular visitor, even creating a new Kandorian identity in 1963 as the superhero Nightwing, with Jimmy Olsen as his sidekick Flamebird.

While Binder and Plastino created the first Kandor story, the tale was elaborated on in a series of stories by writer Edmond Hamilton and artist Curt Swan. Swan particularly enjoyed drawing Kandor stories: "Where else could you have the fun of creating an entire city in a bottle? I think Al Plastino had first drawn Kandor, the Kryptonian city that had been miniaturized... But I had a lot of fun inventing all that tiny futuristic architecture, not to mention the view from inside the bottle — with the "giant" figures peering in". Swan also added: "Creating and re-creating the city was so much fun, in fact, that there was never a standard pattern or skyline of Kandor; it was never drawn the same way twice".

The people of Kandor were finally restored to normal size, to settle on a new planet that they called Rokyn ("God's Gift", from the name of the Kryptonian god Rao). This event was mentioned parenthetically in a 1965 story, "The Five Legion Orphans!" (Adventure Comics #356, May 1965), a prediction that was fulfilled in "Let My People Grow!" (Superman #338, August 1979). In the latter story, Superman uses an enlarging ray to bring the city back; while the buildings prove unstable and crumble to dust, the restored citizens are happily relocated to their new home.

Len Wein, writer of this final Kandor story, said in a 2006 interview that he regretted restoring the city to normal size: "Although I like the ending of the story, I'm sorry I did the story. I don't think that any of us realized at the time that what was old to us was new to somebody just coming in... I came at Kandor thinking: 'I'm so tired of this. It's been 20 years, 30 years, of that stupid city'. So I came up with a story I thought might have some emotional impact... I regret that, because the idea of a bottle city of tiny people is a much cooler idea than what I left it as".

== Fictional history ==
=== Silver Age ===
The first Kandor story, "The Super-Duel in Space", establishes that Kandor — Krypton's capital city — was stolen years before the planet exploded. Superman has no powers when he is inside the jar due to Kandor artificially replicating Krypton's environment. Superman liberates all of Brainiac's bottled cities, except for Kandor. He brings it to the Fortress of Solitude, resolving to eventually restore it to normal size.

In 1960, Otto Binder and Curt Swan introduced the Superman Emergency Squad, a group of volunteer Kandorians who occasionally assist Superman, using technology to enlarge themselves to the size of dolls.

=== Post-Crisis ===
When the DC Universe continuity was rebooted in the 1985–86 miniseries Crisis on Infinite Earths, Kandor's history was changed. In this version of the story, Kandor was destroyed a thousand years before Krypton's end, blown up with an atomic device by the terrorist organization Black Zero.

A new version of Kandor was introduced in 1996, this one populated with a collection of various alien species, held in a prison that looked like a bottle but was actually an extra-dimensional space, created by the alien wizard Tolos.

Superman's history was shaken up again with the 2003–04 miniseries Superman: Birthright, which replaced the post-Crisis status quo with a new version of Superman's early years. In this continuity, the city was stolen and shrunk by Brainiac. A telepathic version of Kandor is present within the Joe Kelly series Superman: Godfall, controlled by Lyla.

The storylines and relaunches Infinite Crisis (2005–2006), Superman: New Krypton (2009), The New 52 (2011) and DC Rebirth (2016) have resulted in a number of different versions of Kandor, with varying degrees of resemblance to the original Silver Age creation. In the New Krypton world, the city is enlarged, but its people come into conflict with Earth and suffer heavy casualties thanks to the machinations of Lex Luthor. In The New 52, the Kandorians are manipulated into seeing Superman as their captor rather than their savior for failing to enlarge them.

== Known inhabitants ==
The inhabitants of Kandor have varied in different continuities:

=== Earth-One's Kandor inhabitants ===
- Ak-Var - A former Phantom Zone inhabitant who now operates as Flamebird.
- Dev-Re - A science councillor who was part of the earlier establishment of Kandor. He has since become a friend of Superman.
- Dik-Zee - The twin brother of Van-Zee and first cousin once removed of Superman and Supergirl who once fell in love with Lois Lane.
- Don-El - The son of Nim-El (twin brother of Jor-El) and first cousin of Superman and Supergirl. He is the police chief of Kandor.
- El Gar Kur - A Kandorian criminal who posed as Jimmy Olsen.
- Lesla-Lar - A Kandorian scientist and enemy of Supergirl.
- Lili Van-Zee - The daughter of Van-Zee and second cousin of Superman and Supergirl.
- Lyle-Zee - The son of Van-Zee, brother of Lili Van-Zee, and second cousin of Superman and Supergirl.
- Nor-Kann - A scientist and prosecutor who is an old friend of Jor-El. He was responsible for creating Flamebird and Nightwing.
- Shyla Kor-Onn - A Kandorian scientist and former Phantom Zone inmate.
- Sylvia DeWitt - A human heiress who fell in love with Van-Zee after he was rejected by Lois Lane. The two of them had children named Lili Van-Zee and Lyle-Zee.
- Van-Zee - The twin brother of Dik-Zee and first cousin once removed of Superman and Supergirl who operated as Nightwing. After being unable to win over the affections of Lois Lane, Van-Zee won over the affections of Sylvia DeWitt. The two of them got married and have children named Lili Van-Zee and Lyle-Zee.
- Zora Vi-Lar - A Kandorian who operated as Black Flame and antagonized Supergirl.

=== New Earth's Kandor inhabitants ===
- Alura Zor-El - The mother of Kara Zor-El.
- Asha Del-Nar - A Kandorian lieutenant and former writer in the Artist Guild.
- Dal Kir-Ta - An aspirant and member of the Military Guard who was recruited by Fer-Gor.
- Fer-Gor - A Kandorian commander of the Military Guild.
- General Zod
- Jax-Ur
- Jeq-Vay - An aspirant first class and member of the Red Shard branch of the Military Guild.
- Preus - A xenophobic Kandorian officer introduced in Godfall.
- Kal-El - He worked as a commander during his time in Kandor.
- Kara Zor-El
- Non
- Tyr-Van - A councillor of the Labor Guild.

=== Prime-Earth's Kandor inhabitants ===
- Ak Var
- Dik-Zee
- El Gar Kur
- Lesla-Lar
- Lili Van-Zee
- Lily-Zee
- Sylvia DeWitt
- Van-Zee

== Other versions ==
- Kandor appears in Frank Miller's The Dark Knight Strikes Again and The Dark Knight III: The Master Race. In the former story, Lex Luthor acquired the city and threatens its population to keep Superman loyal to him until the city is freed by Superman's daughter Lara and the Atom and the inhabitants return to full size. Additionally, a church of Kandorians who had gained powers and gone insane, led by Quar and his acolyte Baal, appear in the latter story.
- Kandor serves as inspiration for Superman: Red Son. After Kal-El's rocket landed in Ukraine and he eventually went on to become a Soviet citizen, Brainiac shrinks and bottles Stalingrad.

== Reception ==
In the 2015 book The Man from Krypton: A Closer Look at Superman, Adam-Troy Castro criticizes "The Pathetic Inferiority Complex of the Kandorians": "As of now, the average size of the remaining members of the species is defined quite well by the people of Kandor, who now face a practical choice between being small and living in a bottle on a shelf, or being small and free to zip around with godlike powers. It seems an obvious choice to me, but the Kandorians remain so self-conscious about being small that they prefer indefinite storage on Superman's shelf. This does not speak well of Kryptonian ambition".

== Influence ==
Artist Mike Kelley created sculptural variations of Kandor, dozens of which were shown at various museums.

== In other media ==
=== Television ===
- Kandor appears in The World's Greatest SuperFriends episode "Terror at 20,000 Fathoms".
- Kandor appears in Smallville. This version was razed by the Black Zero terrorist organization before Jor-El stored and cloned many of its soldiers in a device called the Orb as part of a plan devised by the Science Council should Krypton be destroyed. The Orb later ends up on Earth, where Tess Mercer uses its stored DNA to create clones of the soldiers, such as Major Zod.
- Kandor appears in the Legion of Super Heroes episode "Message in a Bottle". This version contained a device called the Messenger, which stabilized Krypton by crystallizing unstable matter. When Brainiac shrunk and stole Kandor, he took the Messenger with it, thus ensuring Krypton's destruction. After Imperiex invades the city, Brainiac 5 temporarily turns Kandor's artificial sun from red to yellow to empower its inhabitants so they can help the Legion of Super-Heroes fend off Imperiex. After Imperiex is defeated, the Legion uses the Messenger to restore Krypton and Kandor.
- Kandor appears in the Batman: The Brave and the Bold episode "Battle of the Superheroes!".
- Kandor appears in Justice League Action. This version was originally in Brainiac's possession before the Justice League claim it.
- Kandor appears in Krypton. This version is the hometown of Seg-El. Additionally, a time-traveling Dru-Zod and Val-El thwart Brainiac's effort to shrink and steal the city.
- Kandor appears in My Adventures with Superman. This version is a space station that serves as the Kryptonian Empire's base before Superman and Supergirl destroy it.
- Kandor appears in Harley Quinn. This version was rebuilt by Brainiac to become the "perfect city" before he shrunk it.

=== Film ===
- Kandor appears in All-Star Superman.
- Kandor makes a cameo appearance in Superman vs. The Elite.
- Kandor appears in Superman: Unbound. This version is initially held by Brainiac, who closely monitors and tends to its inhabitants, before Superman rescues the city, brings it to an uninhabited Krypton-like planet, and enlarges it so its residents can begin anew.
- Kandor appears in Man of Steel.

=== Video games ===
Kandor appears in Injustice: Gods Among Us.

=== Miscellaneous ===
- Kandor appears in the novel The Last Days of Krypton, written by Kevin J. Anderson. This version represented the most majestic elements of Krypton's culture and was home to the most venal and short-sighted of the planet's aristocracy along with Superman's maternal grandparents and uncle. Additionally, Brainiac stole and shrunk the city as part of a deal with General Zod.
- Kandor is referenced in The Dukes of Stratosphear's song "Brainiac's Daughter", which appears on their Psonic Psunspot album.
