= Alura (DC Comics) =

Fictional character in the DC Comics Universe

- Variant cover art of Supergirl #47 (January 2010) by Joshua Middleton

Publication information
- Publisher: DC Comics
- First appearance: Action Comics #252 (May 1959)
- Created by: Otto Binder; Al Plastino

In-story information
- Full name: Alura In-Ze
- Species: Kryptonian
- Place of origin: Krypton
- Supporting character of: Supergirl; Superman
- Notable aliases: Alura In-Zee
- Abilities: (Under a yellow sun): Superhuman strength, stamina, endurance, speed, agility, reflexes, intelligence, longevity, and hearing; Solar radiation absorption and projection; Enhanced vision; EM spectrum vision; Microscopic vision; X-ray vision; Telescopic vision; Infra-red vision; Invulnerability; Ice and wind breath; Flight; Heat vision; Vocal mimicry

Alura In-Ze is a character appearing in American comic books published by DC Comics, usually those involving Superman. Alura is the Kryptonian daughter of In-Zee, wife of Zor-El, mother of Supergirl/Power Girl, and paternal aunt (by marriage) of Superman. Created by writer Otto Binder and artist Al Plastino, the character first appeared in Action Comics #252 (May 1959).

The character has appeared in media adaptations of the Superman and Supergirl comics, including live-action films, television programs and video games. Alura was portrayed by Mia Farrow in the 1984 film Supergirl. Laura Benanti portrayed the character in the first two seasons of the Arrowverse series Supergirl, with Erica Durance taking over the role in season three.

== Publication history ==
The character Alura appeared unnamed in Action Comics #252 (May 1959) as part of the origin of Supergirl (Kara Zor-El). She was created by Otto Binder and Al Plastino. Her role was similar to that of what Lara was to Superman. She and her husband, Zor-El, send her to a spaceship from Argo City to Earth to survive.

== Fictional character biography ==
=== Pre-Crisis ===
==== Earth-One ====
In pre-Crisis continuity, Alura supported her husband Zor-El, one of the only scientists to believe his older brother Jor-El's predictions about the impending destruction of Krypton. When Krypton exploded, Argo City was blown safely into space with a life-giving bubble of air around it. A later version of the story had the city saved by a dome that Zor-El created. The explosion turns the ground beneath Argo City into Kryptonite, which is covered with protective lead sheets. The Kryptonians manage to stay alive for many years, with Kara being born several years after the destruction of Krypton. When Kara is a teenager, a meteor storm damages the lead sheeting, exposing the survivors to kryptonite radiation and forcing Kara to be sent to Earth in a rocket. It is later revealed that Zor-El and Alura survived by teleporting into the Survival Zone, a dimension similar to the Phantom Zone. Kara rescues her parents, who relocate to New Krypton/Rokyn.

==== Earth-Two ====
In the alternate universe of Earth-Two, Allura In-Z is married to Zor-L and lives in Kandor rather than Argo City. The two do not survive Krypton's destruction.

=== Post-Crisis ===
In "The Supergirl from Krypton" story-arc in Superman/Batman #8-13 (May–October 2004), Alura and Zor-El rocketed their daughter away from Krypton before Kal-El left. It was expected that she would reach Earth first and could help raise Kal from his infancy. However, she stayed in stasis and her ship did not reach Earth until years later, so the infant she expected to help raise was a grown man when she arrived still in her teens.

It is later revealed that Alura saved Argo City from Krypton's destruction by engineering a protective dome with her husband Zor-El. However, Brainiac merges Argo with the Bottle City of Kandor and killed those he considered to be duplicate information. Superman finds the city in Brainiac's ship. Zor-El and Alura are able to make contact with Kal-El to enquire about their daughter. The Bottle City of Kandor reverts to its full size in the North Pole at the end of the "Brainiac" story arc, which leads directly into "New Krypton".

Alura has a major role in the "New Krypton" storyline. She is shown not to trust Earth people, and does not approve of her daughter or nephew's choices. After Zor-El is murdered by Reactron, Alura takes command of Kandor, putting many Superman's enemies in the Phantom Zone and waging war on humanity. Alura uses Kryptonian Sunstones to turn Kandor into a new planet, "New Krypton", and put it into orbit around the Sun at the opposite side of Earth. Reactron later kills himself, initiating a chain reaction which destroys New Krypton and kills all but seven thousand of its inhabitants, including Alura.

== Powers and abilities ==
Alura In-Ze has all the powers and weaknesses of a Kryptonian from exposure to Earth's yellow sunlight.

== In other media ==
=== Television ===
- Alura appears in the Super Friends episode "The Krypton Syndrome".
- A character based on Alura, named Kala In-Ze, appears in the Superman: The Animated Series episode "Little Girl Lost", voiced by Carolyn Seymour.
- Alura appears in Supergirl (2015), portrayed initially by Laura Benanti in the first and second seasons, and later by Erica Durance in the third and fifth seasons. This version is a member of the Kryptonian Science Council and has a twin sister named Astra In-Ze (also portrayed by Benanti). Towards the end of the third season, Supergirl discovers that Alura is still alive and is part of Argo City's High Council, with Zor-El having built a fail-safe around Argo City to protect it from Krypton's destruction.
- Alura appears in the DC Super Hero Girls episode "#DCSuperHeroBoys", voiced by Kari Wahlgren. This version is a member of the council of Krypton and imprisoned General Zod, Ursa, and Non in the Phantom Zone.

=== Film ===
- Alura appears in Supergirl (1984), portrayed by Mia Farrow. This version is a Krypton survivor living in Argo City, in the Phantom Zone.
- Alura makes a non-speaking cameo appearance in a flashback in Superman/Batman: Apocalypse.
- Alura appears in Superman: Unbound, voiced by Sirena Irwin. This version is alive alongside Zor-El in the city of Kandor, imprisoned by Brainiac.
- Alura appears in DC Super Hero Girls: Hero of the Year, voiced by April Stewart.
- Alura appears in Legion of Super-Heroes, voiced by Jennifer Hale.She appears in an opening flashback showing Kara escaping from Krypton, and later at the end of the film, where her spirit reunites with Kara and convinces her to send the Miracle Machine to another dimension and prevent it from destroying the universe.
- Alura appears in Justice League: Crisis on Infinite Earths, voiced again by Jennifer Hale.
- Alura appears in Supergirl (2026), portrayed by Emily Beecham. This version is when she and her husband Zor-El evacuate along with many Kryptonians to Argo City during the destruction of the planet Krypton. Zor-El activates a force field system that separates a fragment containing the city from the planet, preventing its destruction when its core explodes. After giving birth to her daughter Kara, Alura dies from the kryptonite radiation that affects all of Argo City.

=== Video games ===
Alura appears in Injustice 2, voiced by Grey DeLisle.
