= Superman logo =

Emblem of comic book superhero

Superman shield
- The main emblem used since 1977

Publication information
- Publisher: DC Comics
- First appearance: Action Comics #1 (June 1938)
- Created by: Jerry Siegel; Joe Shuster

In story information
- Type: Emblem
- Element of stories featuring: Superman

The Superman shield, also known as the Superman logo, Superman symbol, or Superman S, is the iconic emblem for the DC Comics superhero Superman. As a representation of one of the first superheroes, it served as a template for character design decades after Superman's first appearance. The tradition of wearing a representative symbol on the chest was followed by many subsequent superheroes, including Batman, Spider-Man, Green Lantern, the Flash, Wonder Woman, Hawkman, and many others.

In its current form, the logo is a red capital "S" inside a pentagonal yellow stylized shield with a red border. In earlier Superman stories, "S" was simply an initial for "Superman", but in the 1978 film, it was portrayed as the family crest of the House of El, the family of Superman.

== Evolution of the symbol ==
In its original inception in Action Comics #1, Superman's symbol was a letter S with red and blue on a yellow police badge symbol that resembled a shield. The symbol was first changed a few issues later in Action Comics #7. The shield varied over the first few years of the comics, and many times was nothing more than an inverted triangle with an S inside of it.

The shield first became a diamond in the Fleischer Studios animated serial Superman. It was black with a red S outlined with white (or occasionally with yellow). The S has varied in size and shape and the diamond shape containing it has also changed size and shape. Extreme examples of this would be the very large logo on the Dean Cain costume from the television series Lois & Clark: The New Adventures of Superman and the comparatively small version of the shield as depicted in the 2006 film Superman Returns. It has, in most incarnations, retained its original color, while changing shape here and there. The classic logo is the basis for virtually all other interpretations of the logo.

In the mid-1990s, when Superman's costume and powers changed briefly, during the "Superman Red/Superman Blue" comic book storylines, the shield changed colors and slightly changed shape, in accordance with the changes in the costume. In 1992's 75th edition of Vol 2, the logo is shown soaked in blood, depicting Superman's death. In Superman #123, Superman's new powers force him to find a suit capable of containing his new abilities. The effective material found to create Superman's suit, along with being blue and silver, was also courtesy of Lex Luthor. Not only did the colors and powers change, the logo also evolved into a re-imagined "electric" emblem. In the miniseries Kingdom Come, an aged Superman sported an S–like symbol against a black background in a red pentagon. The 2025 film uses a similar logo to that of Kingdom Come, but in the classic red-and-yellow color scheme.

In the 2000s television series Smallville, the S symbol originally appeared as a diamond with a vertical infinity symbol (to be similar to the S), in an attempt to make it seem more alien. However, beginning with the sixth-season episode "Zod", Clark Kent is given a crystal bearing the S logo in the style of the Superman Returns logo. The logo also appeared in the first episode of the series, when the students captured Clark by giving him a kryptonite necklace and tied him to a cross-like beam in a cornfield and painted a red 'S' (short for Scarecrow) on Clark's chest.

=== Symbol evolution ===
Some of the symbols used by Superman through the years are:

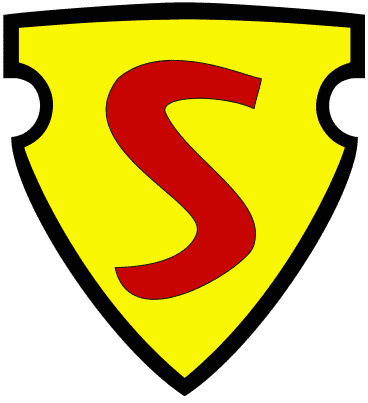
1938

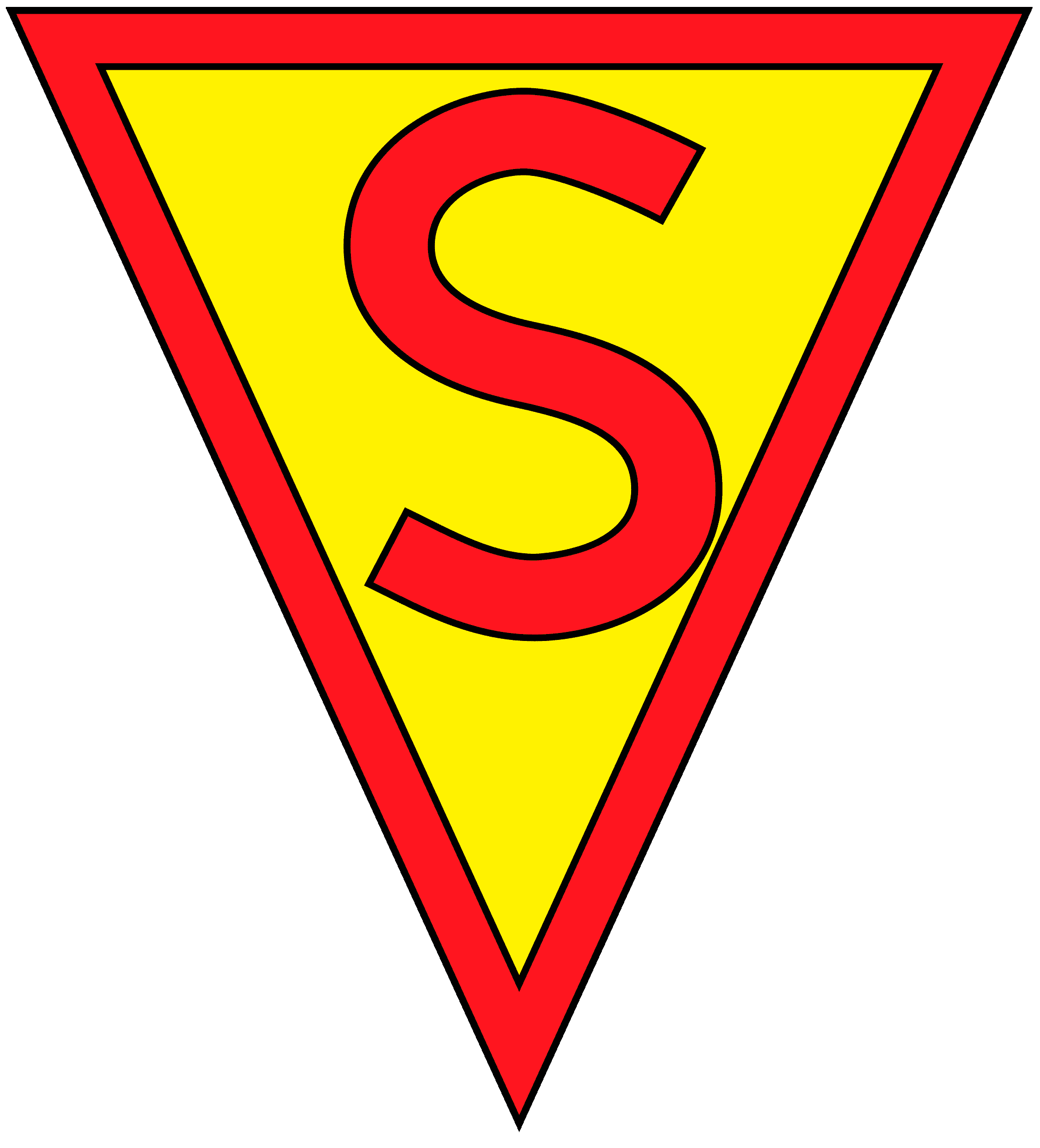
1938–39

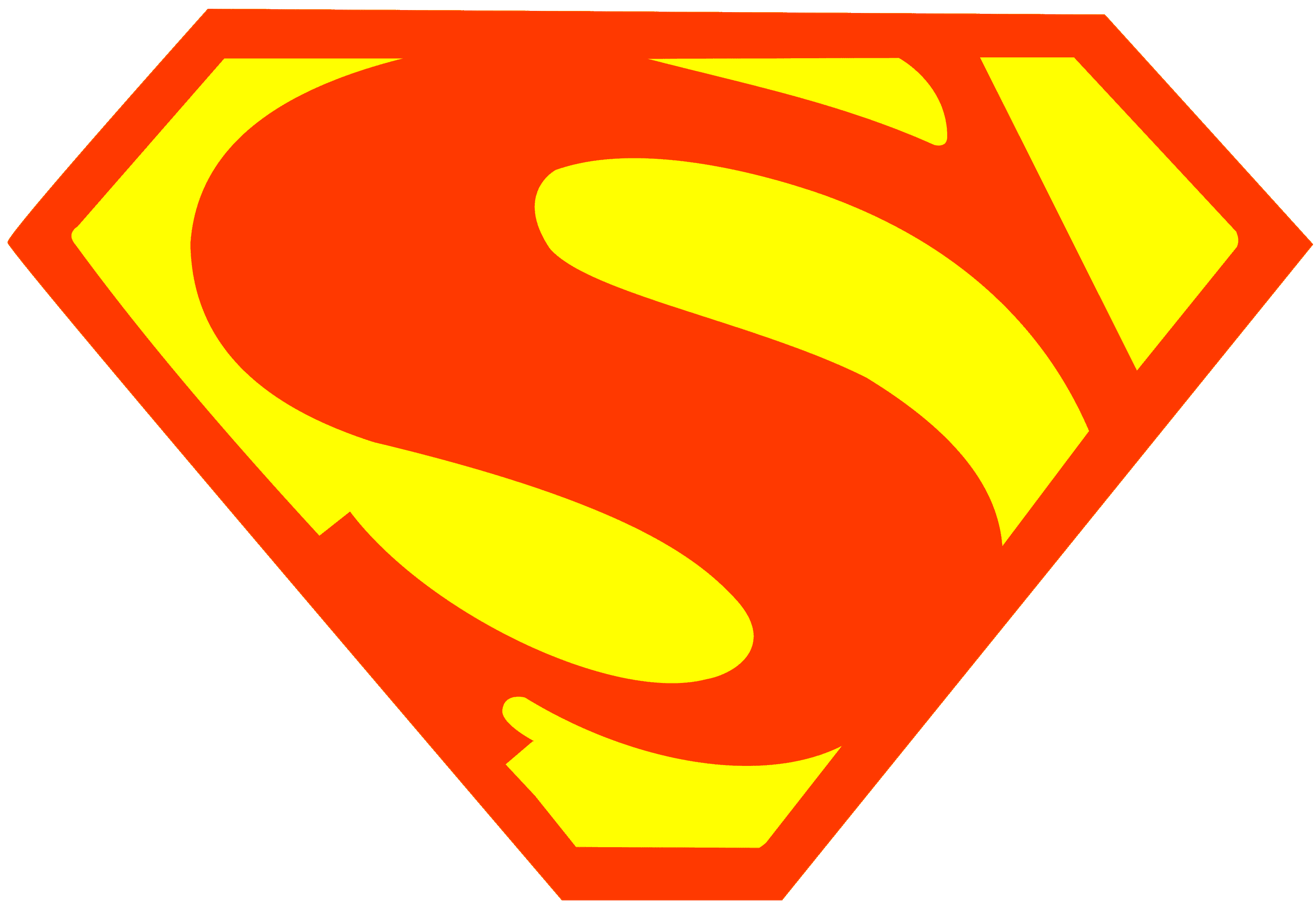
1940

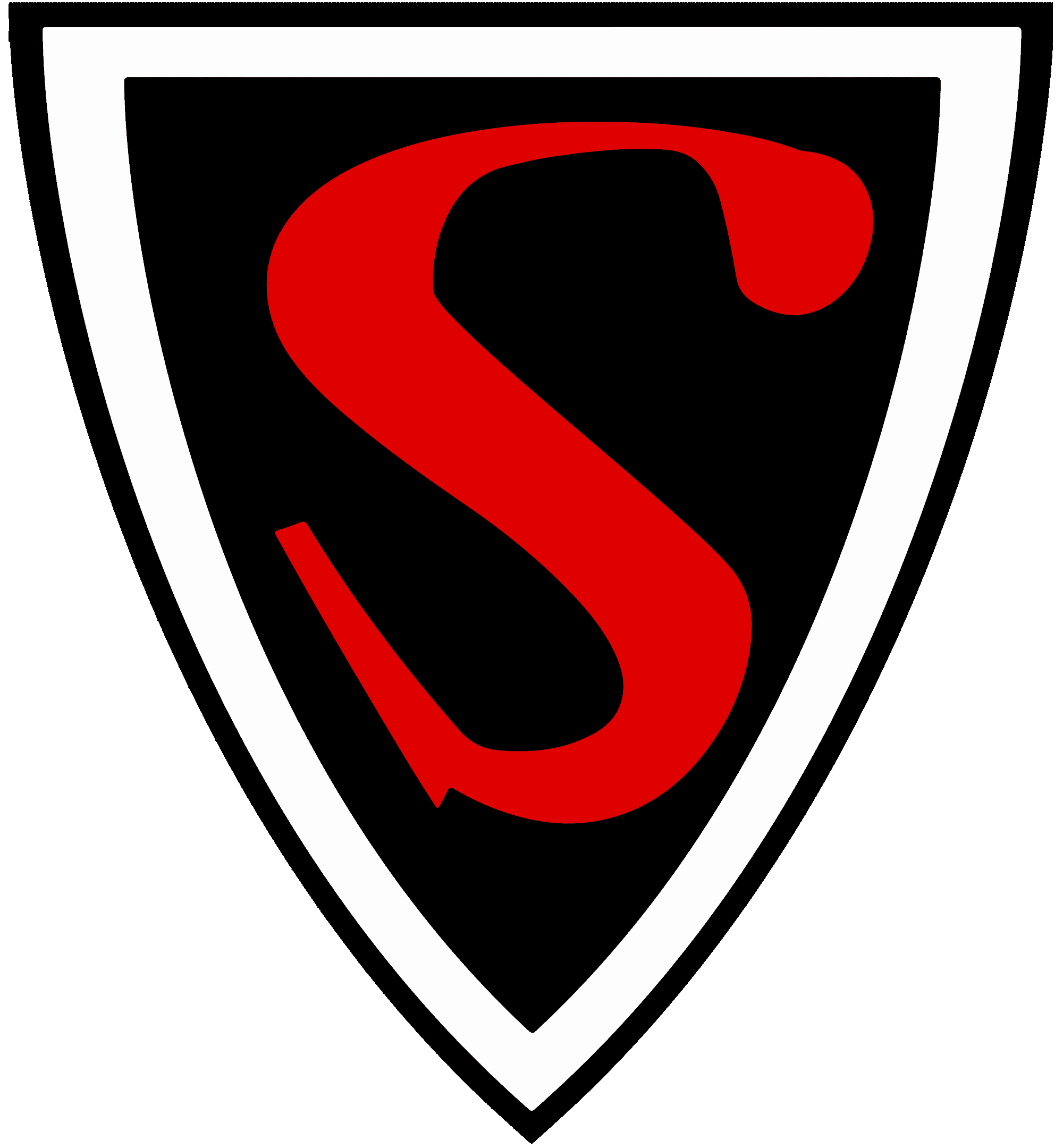
1940–46 (Note: Used mainly on Paramount/Fleischer cartoon serial Superman)

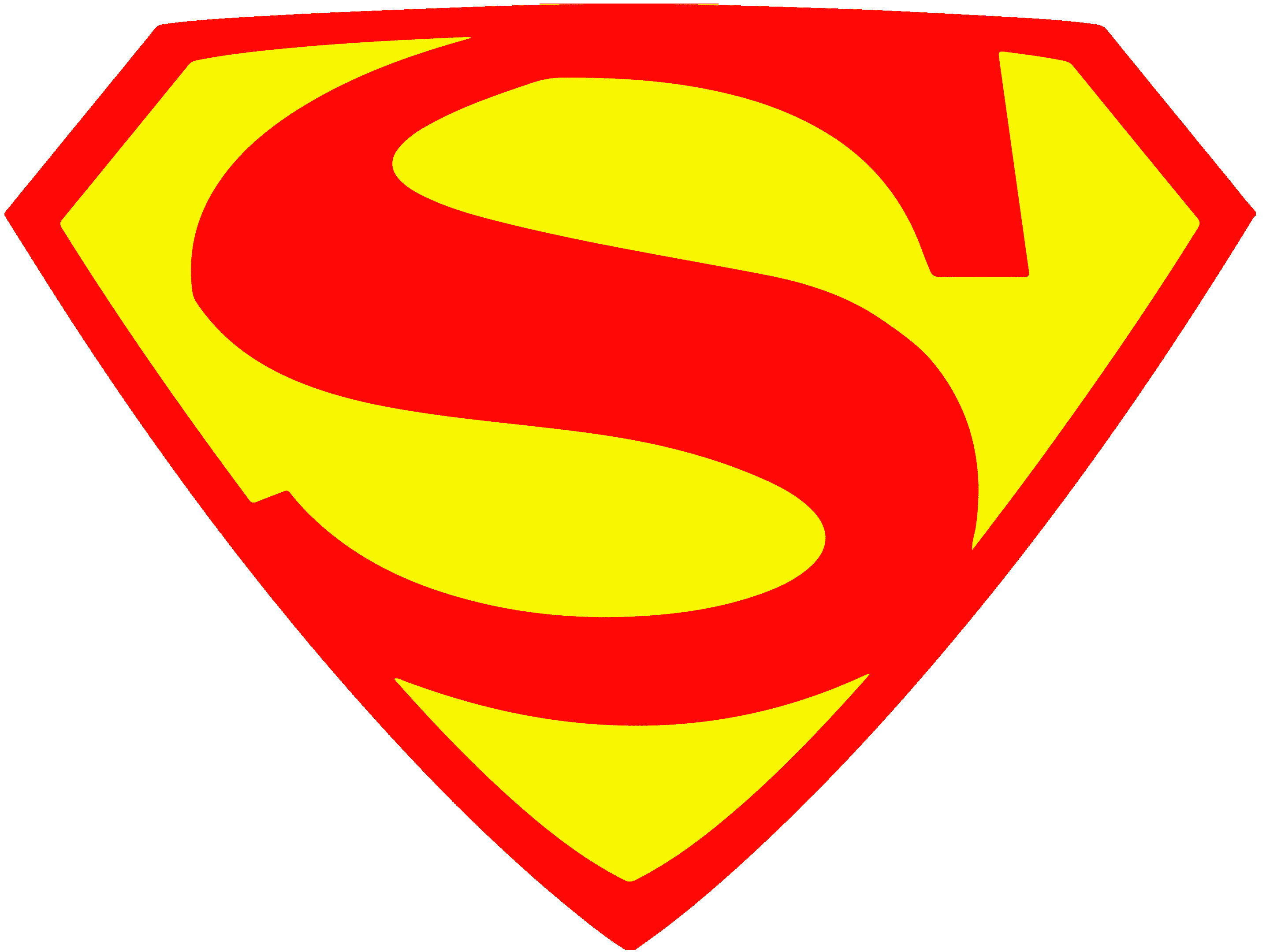
1944

1977–present

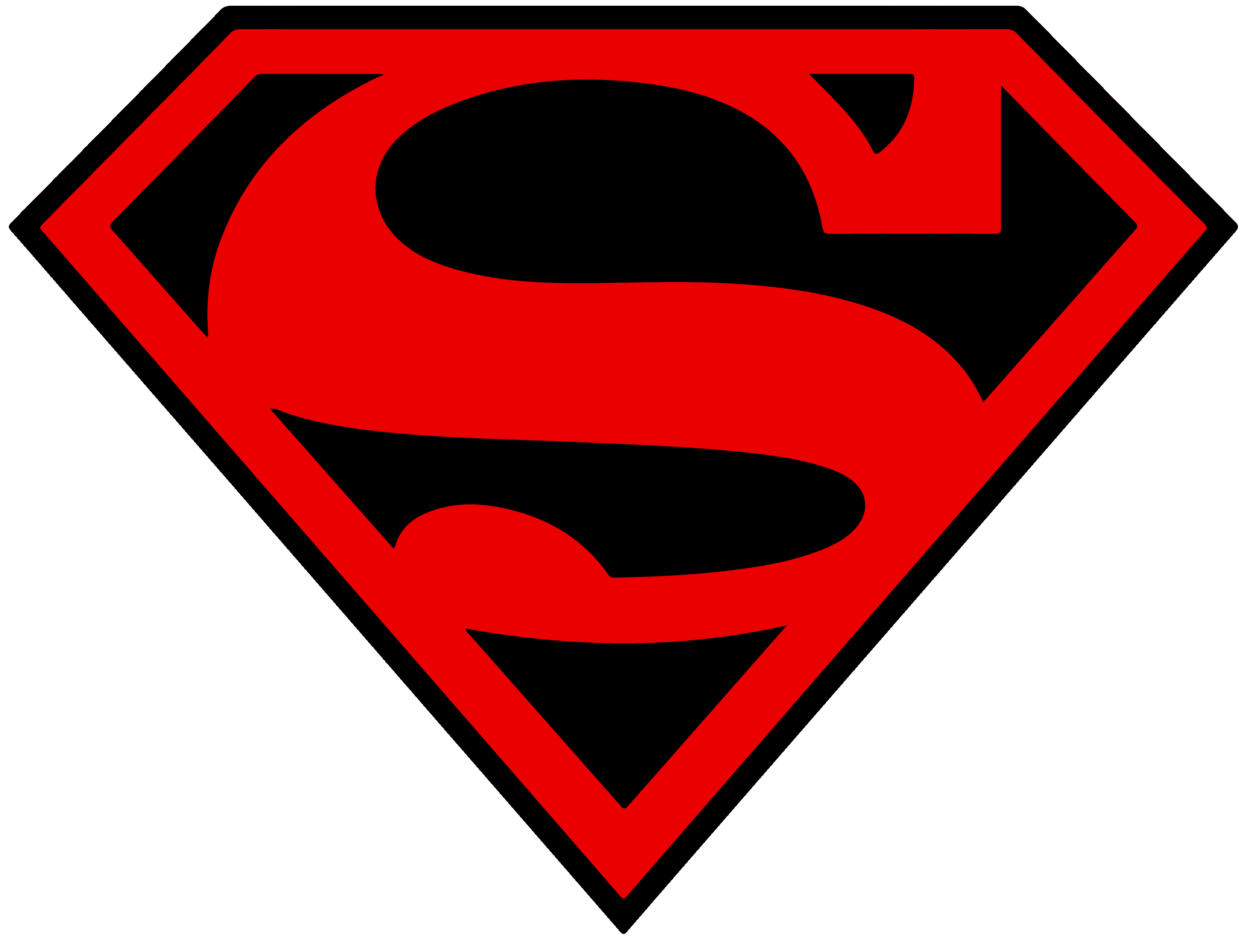
2001–03 (Note: Introduced in Superman (Vol. 2) # 175.)

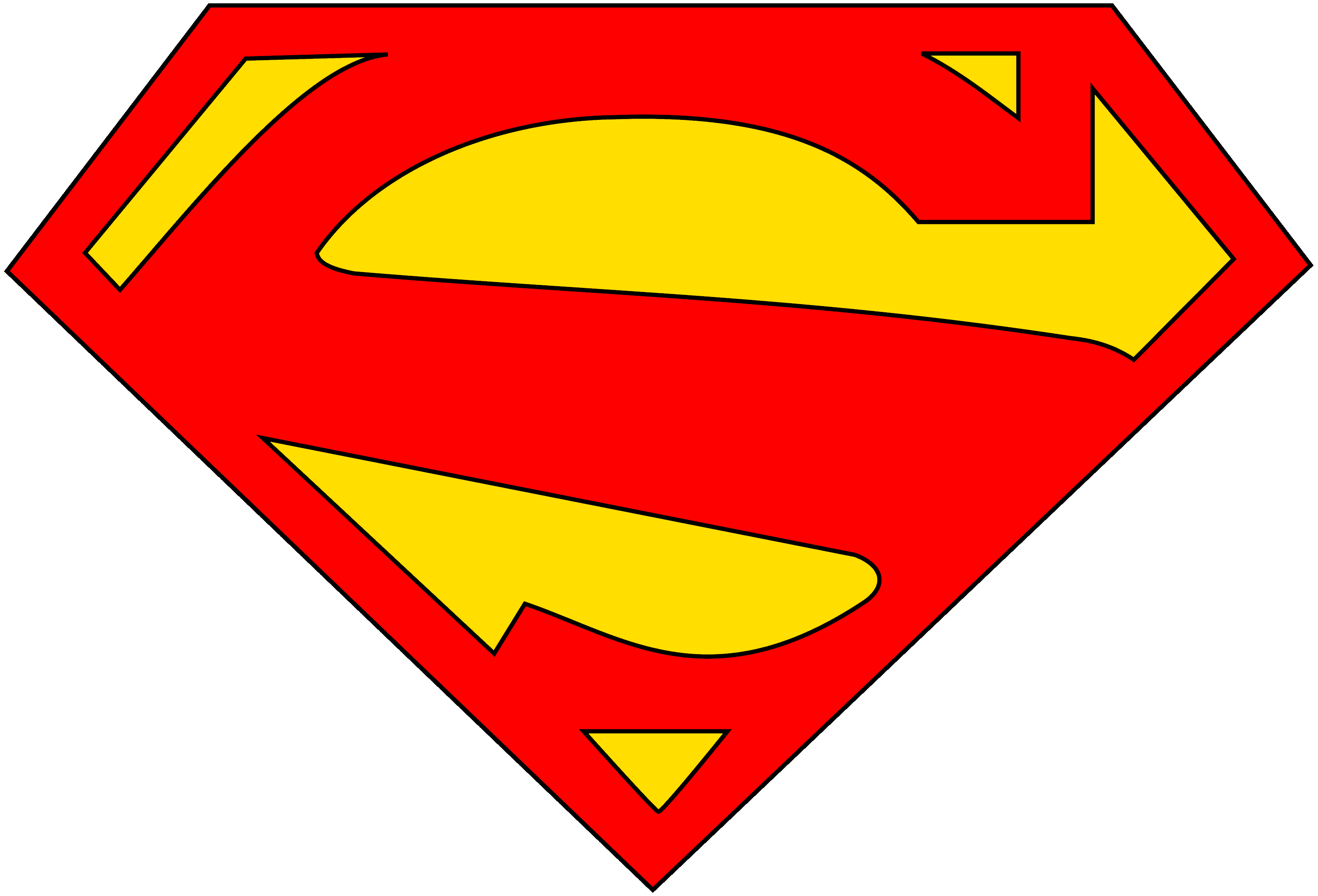
2011–16 (Note: Used during the New 52 era.)

== Representations ==
Initially, the S-shield had one meaning: S for Superman. One of the first alternative meanings was presented in Superman: The Movie, in which it was not an S, but rather the S-shaped Coat of arms of the House of El. Marlon Brando, who portrayed Jor-El, conceived the idea of the "S" being a family crest, from which folklore spun off. In the Superman reboot story The Man of Steel, the logo was designed by Jonathan Kent and derived from an ancient Native American symbol. It was featured on a medicine blanket given to an ancestor of the Kent family by a Native American tribe after he helped to cure them of a plague. The symbol was supposed to represent a snake, an animal held to possess healing powers by the tribe, and thus would imply that, by wearing this symbol, Superman was a metaphorical healer. This origin was also included in the 1997 Superman encyclopedia.

In 2004, Mark Waid's Superman: Birthright series stated that the S-Shield is the Kryptonian symbol for "hope" and Superman believes it may have begun as a coat of arms for the House of El. Later, writer Geoff Johns confirmed it was indeed a coat of arms, as well as a symbol for hope. In the 2013 film Man of Steel, Jor-El mentions that the symbol represents the House of El and means "hope", and Superman later also specifies that it is not an "S" when Lois Lane asks what the "S" was short for. Superman further explains that the design is based on a river in the 2017 film Justice League.

In Supergirl, Kara Danvers states that the Kryptonian symbol stands for her family's motto, "Stronger together."

=== House of El ===
Marv Wolfman's novelization of the film Superman Returns depicts the symbol as belonging to one of the three primary houses of Krypton that brought peace to the planet after a civil uprising, a serpent coiled inside a shield, a warning not to return to the ways of violence and deception. The shield has since been taken as a coat of arms, resulting in Jor-El's continued presence in the council despite his "mad" findings. The other two are merely described, including Pol-Us' eye of vigilance and Kol-Ar's open hand of truth and justice.

=== Cape ===
For decades, almost all versions of Superman's red cape had an all-yellow version of the logo, with a thin black line separating the areas. Since Superman: The Animated Series, where the logo was absent from Superman's cape due to the difficulty in animating the S, subsequent comics and adaptations have varied from using the yellow logo to using a plain red cape.

=== Variants ===
In the 1960s the tiny bottle city of Kandor, the miniaturized capital city of the planet Krypton, resided in Superman's Fortress of Solitude. Originally, certain inhabitants resembling Kal-El formed the Superman Emergency Squad and would, on occasion, leave the bottle, enter the Earth's atmosphere and gain super powers to aid Superman. As designed by artist Curt Swan, their uniforms were similar to that of Superman save for the 'S' on their chests which resembled the early version, the 'S' and border in red on a yellow field, but in an elongated triangle.

During the Reign of the Supermen story arc, Each of the four different Supermen was represented by a variant of the symbol, which each wore on their person.

- Eradicator wore a normal shield when he attempted to continue Superman's career. Later on, he wore a slightly altered, more curved version with an opening in the border and which was red and black instead of yellow and red.
- Cyborg Superman's shield was half-normal on the left side, but the red darkened to an almost black color on the right half.
- Superboy (Conner Kent) wore an all-yellow symbol stitched into the back of his leather jacket, in addition to a normal one on his chest.
- Steel wore an all-metallic symbol. The classic 'S' was redesigned into metallic burnt red color with a grey undertone in the background.

Other variations include:

- Black and red
  - Conner Kent sports a black and red variant of the symbol on his third costume. Lex Luthor hypothesized it is because that version of the symbol was everywhere following the death of Superman and his consequent first appearance.
  - In Kingdom Come, Superman wears a black and red, simplified version following his return.
  - After the Imperiex War, Superman wore the black and red variant to signify his mourning of the losses during the war.
  - The Eradicator, for a time, wore a red and blacked, curvier version of the S-Shield.
- Bizarro's symbol is a reversed purple and yellow version.
- The inverted symbol, first seen in 52, means "resurrection" in Kryptonian.
- Jor-El sports a white symbol on his black clothing, as well as a black symbol on his white clothing in the 1978 Superman movie.
- In his modern appearances, Superman of Earth-2 wears a slightly different version of the symbol. Its most notable difference is an exaggerated serif on the 'S'.
- A variation of the symbol, designed as a stubbed red lightning bolt against a black shield has been used in several media, including an Elseworlds where Darkseid raised Kal-El, and was the basis of one of the final season of Superman: The Animated Series, and an episode named "Brave New Metropolis" from an alternate reality where Superman and Luthor took over Metropolis.
- A further variation, this time a white symbol against a red background, was used in episodes of Justice League and Justice League Unlimited, used by the Superman of the Justice Lords.
- Black and white
  - Superman briefly wore an all-black costume with a white shield following his resurrection at the conclusion of The Death of Superman.
  - In Batman Beyond, an aged Superman wears a heavily stylised symbol, consisting of a white slash within an inverted black triangle, and a rhombus in the upper left corner. A similar symbol is worn by an adult Jon Kent in the alternate future depicted in Futures End.
  - After being transported to the New 52 universe, the pre-Flashpoint Superman wore a black costume with an emblem resembling a white version of the Kingdom Come shield.
- The symbol has been adapted to various flags in alternate realities, including the Nazi swastika (in JL-Axis) and Soviet Union hammer and sickle (Superman: Red Son).

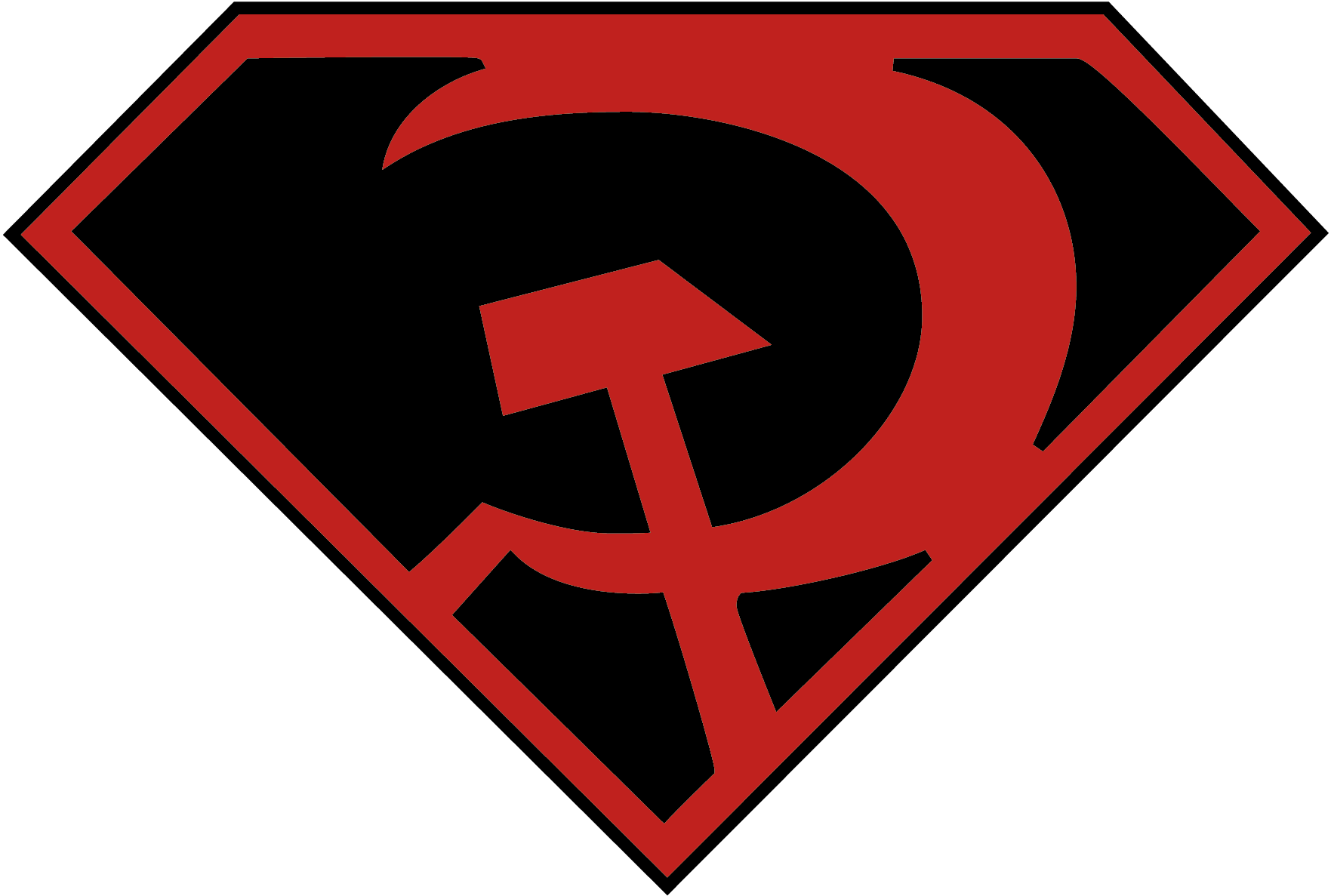
Logo in "Superman: Red Son"

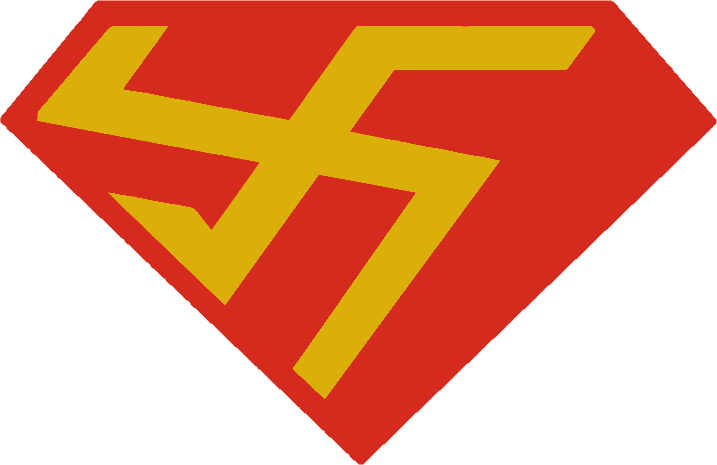
Logo in "JL-Axis"

- In Justice League: The New Frontier and JSA: The Liberty Files, the shield has black background pieces and a yellow outline, resembling the Fleischer Studios version.
- In Superman: Earth One, the shield has an additional yellow outline. Additionally, on the cape, the "S" and the pentagonal outline are yellow, while the inner pentagon is red.
- In Supergirl, the emblem worn by Supergirl has a blue background, with yellow outlines around the red S and border.

=== Wearers of the shield ===
Kryptonian family members of Superman wear the symbol, but sometimes it is worn to honor Superman. After The Death of Superman, many DC Comics superheroes wore a black armband with the Superman logo.

- Superman
  - Kal-El
  - Kal-L (variant)
  - Kal Kent (variant)
- Supergirl
  - Kara Zor-El
  - Linda Danvers
  - Matrix
- Superboy
  - Kal-El (Superman as a teenager; pre-1986)
  - Conner Kent (red and black variant)
  - Superboy-Prime (carves an S-symbol in blood on his chest).
  - Jonathan Samuel Kent (the new Superboy in DC Rebirth, son of Superman and Lois Lane)
- Superwoman
  - Lucy Lane (white and red variant)
- House of El
  - Jor-El (Superman: Birthright, Superman, Action Comics #850, Man of Steel)
  - Lar Gand (Mon-El)
  - Zor-El
- Others
  - Krypto (shown as tag on his collar)
  - Bizarro (reversed 'S', sometimes purple and yellow)
  - The Superman Emergency Squad from Kandor, a red 'S' in an elongated triangle
  - Hank Henshaw (red and black variant, like Kon-El. It is sometimes shown as a white and black variant)
  - Steel (John Henry Irons)
  - Natasha Irons
  - Eradicator (variant)
  - Strange Visitor (variant)
  - Preus
  - Alura (red and white variant)

== Diamond and eight shield ==
In the television series Smallville, an octagonal silver metallic key is used in the Kawatche caves, as well as in a transport device used to travel to the Fortress of Solitude. Along the edges are imprinted Kryptonian characters, one of which is the diamond border of the Superman shield with a figure 8 inside of the diamond instead of the S. The 8-shield is later described as being from an ancient form of the Kryptonian language (in the Kryptonian alphabet employed in the 2004 storyline The Supergirl from Krypton, it corresponds to the letter S), while the modern symbol is the familiar S-shield. The familiar S-shield is seen in season 9. It is used as Clark Kent's calling card in his vigilante actions in Metropolis. Clark, known as the Blur, burns the sign using his heat vision in various places throughout the city. In the season 9 episode "Rabid", Clark mentions while talking to Oliver Queen that the mark "gives people hope."
