= Scorn (comics) =

Scorn, in comics, may refer to:

- Scorn (DC Comics), a DC Comics character
- Scorn (Marvel Comics), a Marvel Comics superhero
- Scorn, a Chris Crosby-created superheroine

== See also ==
- Scorn (disambiguation)
