= Traci Thirteen =

Traci 13
- Traci Thirteen. Art by Pop Mhan.

Publication information
- Publisher: DC Comics
- First appearance: Superman (vol. 2) #189 (February 2003)
- Created by: Joe Kelly; Dwayne Turner

In-story information
- Alter ego: Traci Thirteen
- Species: Homo Magi
- Place of origin: Metropolis
- Team affiliations: Team Superman; Justice League Dark; Justice League Queer; Night Force; Oblivion Bar; Sisterhood of the Sleight Hand
- Partnerships: Natasha Irons; Cir-El; Jaime Reyes
- Supporting character of: Teen Titans; Superwoman; Steel
- Notable aliases: Traci 13, Girl 13
- Abilities: Mystical abilities which enable her to tap into the magic of a city, to perform a wide array of magical acts.; Magical blasts; Magical sight; Telekinesis; Teleportation; Transfiguration; Conjuration; Protection; Divination; Occultism; Keen detective skills

Traci Thirteen, also known as Girl 13 and Traci 13, is a superheroine featured in American comic books published by DC Comics. Created by writer Joe Kelly and artist Dwayne Turner, she first appeared in Superman vol. 2 #189 (February 2003). She is a reoccurring supernatural character in the DC Universe. The daughter of Chinese witch Meihui Lan and supernatural skeptic Doctor Thirteen, her relationship with her father becomes estranged after the death of Meihui, blaming her and forbidding her from using her powers. Instead, she combined her powers with her detective abilities to become a supernatural investigator. The character is often a member of several superhero teams, including the Night Force, Justice League Queer, and the Justice League Dark.

Traci 13 has made several notable appearances in animated media. She appeared in the animated film Teen Titans: The Judas Contract and made her debut in the third season of Young Justice, where she was voiced by Lauren Tom. In Young Justice, the character is named Traci Thurston.

== Publication history ==
Traci Thirteen first appeared in Superman vol. 2 #189 (February 2003), and was created by Joe Kelly and Dwayne Turner.

== Fictional character biography ==
Traci Thirteen is a member of the Homo magi, a lineage of humans with inherent sorcery abilities. Her father, Doctor Thirteen, prohibits her from practicing magic due to her mother's death caused by magical influences. Traci relocates to Metropolis' Suicide Slum, determined to live independently alongside her pet iguana Leeroy. There, she discovers and harnesses the "urban magic" of the city, adopting the moniker Girl 13 and becoming a sort of superhero. She crossed paths with Superboy (Conner Kent), who developed an attraction to her, though the feeling was not reciprocated. Utilizing her magical abilities, Traci defended an injured Superman from a spectral female ninja, alongside fellow "Supergirls" Natasha Irons and Cir-El, forming a friendship with them.

=== Day of Vengeance ===
In the one-shot Day of Vengeance: Infinite Crisis Special, Traci joined a large group of mystical heroes, including Doctor Occult, the Phantom Stranger, and Rex the Wonder Dog in cleaning up one of the Spectre's many rampages. The Rock of Eternity had exploded over Gotham City, unleashing multiple mystical horrors. The group soon recreated the rock, trapping the demons again.

=== One Year Later ===
She resides with her father in Doomsbury Mansion, the ancestral home of her family, annoyed by his skepticism and boring outlook. Blue Beetle #16 established that Traci was raised and trained by Ralph Dibny and his wife Sue some time after her mother's death. A member of the Croatoans, the paranormal detective organization shown in 52, she travels around the world, sometimes with her father, and sometimes solo, fighting paranormal menaces with her growing magical abilities. She has recently started a relationship with Jaime Reyes, the current Blue Beetle. As a result of Jaime becoming a full-time member of the Teen Titans, she has also begun interacting with his teammates, such as during a recent Christmas adventure. For a period of time, Red Devil appeared to feel annoyed by Traci's presence as she distracted his new friend Blue Beetle. However, after she bought him a series of much desired video games, she became quickly accepted by Eddie. She is also featured on the cover of Teen Titans vol. 3 #66 as a potential new member. She opted not to join however, feeling it would be too weird to be on a team with her boyfriend, despite how much fun it would be to mess with his head. She does remain an ally of the Titans, helping them when they need it, especially during the prison riot caused by Shimmer and Jinx, using her magic to disable Jinx's connection to the Earth, thus undoing her barrier spell.

Beginning in May 2010, Traci began co-starring in a back-up feature in Teen Titans alongside Black Alice and Zachary Zatara. The feature ended in September 2010, when Teen Titans reverted to a standard 22-page format.

=== DC Rebirth ===
During the 2016 DC Rebirth event, a newer version of Traci Thirteen was introduced. The character seemingly retains some of her earlier history in her previous version, being the daughter of the witch and homo magi Meihui Lan and Doctor Terry Thirteen, a well-known ghost hunter and skeptic. Unlike prior versions, the Thirteen family is depicted as being a family line of detectives and investigators who generally are irrationally skeptical of the supernatural. It is also expressed that in this continuity, while how her mother died is unknown, her father blames Traci and forbids her from using her magical abilities. When he suddenly disappeared, she became a freelance problem-solver specializing in the supernatural in Metropolis. She was later reunited with her father, who was revealed to have been possessed by demons shortly after her mother's death.

==== Superwoman (2016- 2017) ====
Traci first appears in the Who Killed Superwoman storyline, warning Steel, Natasha, and Lana of Lena Luthor's plans, who has since taken the identity of "Ultrawoman", converted her body into a mechanized chassis, and worked to discredit her brother, Lex Luthor (now known as the "Superman of Metropolis"), whom have used her paraplegia (which he inadvertently contributed to, due to his arrogance in the past concerning her treatments) to his advantage as her contributions to LexCorp was kept secret with Lex gaining all the credit. Creating Bizarro Superwoman as her servants, she began causing havoc in Metropolis, prompting Traci 13's attention due to the nature of her powers making her have an affinity for its well-being, including becoming with concerns with acts that damage the city itself.

Traci later appears in the Midnight Hour storyline, with Natasha and Traci having been dating and Traci's powers having weakened. She helps the Superman Family and Maxima battle M1dn1ght, a computer program created by Lena Luthor that Superwoman inadvertently gave sentience. She informs the team of the connection as M1dn1ght uses black holes to kidnap Metropolis civilians. M1dn1iht manages to capture Superwoman, revealing her origin as a program made to save Lena should she be captured as a failsafe, before Superwoman escapes. Traci sends Superwoman into the "Void", a digital dimension of computer code, to battle M1dn1ght once more.

=== DC Universe (2018- Current) ===
In between her appearances in Superwoman and Raven: Daughter of Darkness, it is mentioned in the 2018 Titans Special series by Natasha that Traci and Natasha had broken up. In the Raven: Daughter of Darkness series, Traci is approached by Baron Winters to combat the Shadowriders, a group of entities who are magicians. While skeptical due to his reputation (from her father's account), she eventually briefly joins Winter's Night Force (consisting of familiar young magic users: Raven, Klarion the Witch Boy, Zach Zatara, Black Alice and newcomers Skye and Robert Diaz) to combat the magic murdering villains and reveals herself as a fan of the Teen Titans hero, Raven.

She later appears in the Blue Beetle run, revealing she used to date Jamie like in the previous literations.

== Characterization ==
Inheriting her magical power from her maternal lineage connected to the homo magi race, Traci's character is typically depicted as a teenager; one source gave an estimation of around seventeen. The character was also originally presented as heterosexual but later depicted as bisexual, her love interests being Jaime Reyes and Natasha Irons. She is also a founder of the witch society, the Sisterhood of the Sleight Hand, aimed to aid other female magic users and offering mystical aid to mortal heroes, as well as a employee of Oblivion Bar.

== Powers and abilities ==
Due to her heritage, she is capable of naturally performing magic and is classified as a magician, making her proficient in casting spells. Her chief ability is utilizing "Urban magic", a form of magic that allows her to tap into the mystical energies residing within a city to perform magical feats. This variation of magic also requires proficiency in scientific concepts and technical skills, making her proficient in computer programming and technology. In addition to her magical prowess, Traci possesses acute detective skills.

As a witch, she possess magical artifacts to enhance her powers; she wields the Staff of Arion, a artifact created by the aforementioned sorcerer she pilfered that amplifies her power and manipulates its considerable arcane energies to allow her to confront powerful entities (i.e Eclipso).

== Other versions ==
- A character named Terri Thirteen briefly appeared in the series 52 as a member of the Croatoan Society. It is believed this character was actually Traci, but misnamed Terri due to editorial oversight.
- Traci appears in the 2011 Flashpoint crossover event, as revealed on DC's blog. In this reality, Traci rescues her father from Paris before it is destroyed by the Atlanteans, though she feels guilty she was unable to save her mother and siblings. She discovers that her father and superheroes from around the world are preparing to take drastic action to stop the Amazons and Atlanteans. She still remembers details of how reality should be, and meets Madame Xanadu for advice. When she tries to stop the heroes from launching nuclear weapons, her father drugs her and proceeds to start the countdown. Traci teleports to find help, but is unsuccessful, and returns to face her father. Doctor Thirteen magically attacks her, apparently having learnt the art of black magic. Failing to defeat her father, Traci decides to teleport to Western Europe to sacrifice herself. Doctor Thirteen arrives and finally accepts his daughter back. But when Traci is impaled by Amazons, Doctor Thirteen becomes enraged and begins a killing spree. Traci is restored to life from her spiritual connection to Earth and manages to stop her father by showing him the planetary consciousness. As the nuclear weapons are about to be activated, Doctor Thirteen uses his magic to destroy them. Traci rescues her father and teleported them back to Earth. It is revealed that they have both used up all of their magic.

== In other media ==
=== Television ===
- Traci Thirteen appears in Young Justice, voiced by Lauren Tom. Introduced in the third season, this version is Traci Thurston, a member of the Team who is in a relationship with Jaime Reyes. In the fourth season, Thurston becomes a student under Zatanna and joins her Sentinels of Magic, during which the group collectively assumes the mantle of Doctor Fate as part of a rotation agreement between Zatanna and Nabu.
- In October 2017, The CW announced a one-hour drama series based on Traci Thirteen and her father Dr. Terrance Thirteen, titled Project 13, was in development, with Elizabeth Banks attached as an executive producer. The project never came to fruition.

=== Film ===
Traci Thirteen appears in Teen Titans: The Judas Contract, voiced by Masasa Moyo. This version works at a soup kitchen.

=== Video games ===
Traci Thirteen appears as a character summon in Scribblenauts Unmasked: A DC Comics Adventure.
