= Scorn =

Scorn may refer to:

== Fictional characters ==
- Scorn (DC Comics), an alias of Ceritak, a supporting character in Superman
- Scorn (Marvel Comics), a spawn of the character Carnage in Marvel Comics
- Scorn (The Batman), a character appearing in the television series The Batman
- Scorn, a dinobot in the Transformers universe
- The Scorn, an alien faction in the video game series Destiny

== Films ==
- Scorn (2000 film), a TV film directed by Sturla Gunnarsson
- Scorn (upcoming film), an erotic thriller
- Scorned, 1994, starring Shannon Tweed
- Scorned (2014 film)
- The Scorned, 2005
- Scorn, a spec script that would later become the 2014 film John Wick

== Music ==
- Scorn (band)
- "Scorn", a B-side to the song "Glory Box" by Portishead
- "Scorn", the third track of Oomph!'s sixth album, Plastik

== Other uses ==
- Scorn (video game), a horror video game
- Contempt, an emotion
- Scorn, a comic created by Chris Crosby and Kevin Onofrio, published by SCC Entertainment

== See also ==
- A Woman Scorned (disambiguation)
- Sneer
