= A Woman Scorned =

A Woman Scorned may refer to:

- A line from the 1697 play The Mourning Bride by William Congreve: "Heaven has no rage like love to hatred turned, Nor hell a fury like a woman scorned" (or, perhaps originally, "Heav'n has no rage, like love to hatred turn'd, ¶ Nor hell a fury, like a woman scorn'd.")
- A Woman Scorned (1911 film)
- A Woman Scorned (1915 film)
- A Woman Scorned: The Betty Broderick Story
- A Woman Scorned (1999 film)

== See also ==
- Hell Hath No Fury (disambiguation)
