= Superman Emergency Squad =

Publication information
- Publisher: DC Comics
- First appearance: Superman's Pal, Jimmy Olsen #48 (October 1960)
- Created by: Otto Binder (script); Curt Swan (art)

In-story information
- Base(s): Kandor
- Member(s): Don-El; Van-Zee; Vitar; Other unnamed members

The Superman Emergency Squad (sometimes called the Supermen Emergency Squad) is a fictional superhero team appearing in American comic books published by DC Comics, commonly associated with Superman.

The squad is a group of volunteers from the bottled city of Kandor, a city from Superman's home planet of Krypton that was shrunk by Brainiac and is kept in a glass jar in Superman's Fortress of Solitude. Outside the bottle, the tiny Kandorians have similar powers to Superman, and when they determine that Superman is in trouble, they can leave the bottle and fly to his assistance. The swarm of Superman-lookalikes uses a special scientific process to enlarge themselves to the size of dolls before heading into the field.

== Publication history ==
They first appeared in "The Mystery of the Tiny Supermen!" in Superman's Pal, Jimmy Olsen #48 (October 1960). They were created by writer Otto Binder and artist Curt Swan.

== Fictional background ==
=== Pre-Crisis ===
Prior to the Crisis on Infinite Earths reboot, the Superman Emergency Squad is a group of miniaturized Kryptonians from the bottle city of Kandor, which is housed in Superman's Fortress of Solitude. The Squad provides assistance to Superman when he is incapacitated or otherwise occupied. Members of the squad include Superman's cousin Van-Zee (who also uses the secret identity Nightwing), and Don-El, the captain of the Squad. In early appearances of the Squad, the members were specially selected due to their close resemblance to Superman; later stories dropped the concept. Their costumes are originally modeled on Superman's, but with the Superman logo in an elongated triangle.

The Squad goes into action whenever they receive a signal from Superman, or see that he is in trouble while monitoring him. To leave Kandor, the Squad uses a small rocket ship to fly up to the cork that seals the mouth of the bottle. They then expose themselves to a enlarging gas that causes them to grow from their regular microscopic size to several inches in height. This gives them the ability to force the cork out of the mouth, allowing them access to the outside world. In later stories, the Squad installs a door in the cork to facilitate exits and entrances.

=== Post-Crisis ===
A new version of the Squad appeared in the Crisis reboot, now renamed the Kandorian Emergency Squad. Instead of providing emergency assistance to Superman, it now acts as a policing unit in Kandor. The Squad is led by Cerizah, sister of Superman's ally Ceritak. In Superman: The Man of Steel #100 (May 2000), the Emergency Squad leaves Kandor to help Superman defeat Hank Henshaw. As time passes at a faster rate in Kandor, the current status of the squad is uncertain.
