= Natasha Irons =

- Natasha Irons.

Publication information
- Publisher: DC Comics
- First appearance: as Natasha Irons: Steel (vol. 2) #1 (January 1994) as Steel: Action Comics #806 (October 2003) as Starlight: 52 #21 (September 27, 2006) as Vaporlock: Infinity Inc. (vol. 2) #8 (June 2008) as Steelgirl: Superman Unlimited #18 (October 2026)
- Created by: Louise Simonson; Chris Batista

In-story information
- Full name: Natasha Jasmine Irons
- Species: Human
- Place of origin: Metropolis; Washington D.C. Jersey City
- Team affiliations: Infinity Inc. Team Superman; Titans; Justice League; Justice League Queer; Steelworks
- Partnerships: Traci Thirteen; Steel (John Henry Irons); Superwoman (Lana Lang); Power Girl; Omen
- Supporting character of: Superman; Power Girl; Steel (John Henry Irons); Black Lightning
- Notable aliases: Steel, Starlight, Vaporlock, Jenny Blake
- Abilities: Genius-level intellect; skilled inventor, engineer, and computer programmer. Access to advance technology.; Skilled in politics, medicine, and dance. Proficiency in hand-to-hand combatant.; As Steel: Uses power amor suits granting: superhuman strength, durability, energy projection, etc. Often accompanied with a "Kinetic Hammer", locked towards genetic signature.; As Starlight: Superhuman strength, endurance, flight, control over light and solar energies.; As Vaporlock: Shift between human and a gaseous form at will.

Natasha Irons is a superheroine appearing in American comic books published by DC Comics. First created by Louise Simonson and Chris Batista, she debuted in Steel (vol. 2) #1 (February 1994). Since her inception, the character appears as a supporting character for Superman and various characters affiliated with him, including the original version of Steel and Power Girl within their respective comic book series.

The daughter of the criminal Crash (Clay Michael Irons) and niece of John Henry Irons, Natasha found an affinity with her genius uncle at a young age, being highly intelligent herself. Becoming aware of her uncle's secret identity as Steel, she supports him and later dons her own technological armor as works as an assistant for his company, Steelworks. As the second Steel, Natasha Irons is a member of Team Superman and one of the world's smartest women in the DC Universe. Additionally, she often serves in various teams as a technological specialist and expert. Natasha has also adopted different codenames after gaining superpowers through Lex Luthor's Everyman Project, first known as Starlight before adopting the name Vaporlock following a change in her powers-set, with each name reflecting the nature of her powers, and finally adopting the name of Steelgirl.

The character has made several appearance in media, including Superman: The Animated Series where she is voiced by Cree Summer and is portrayed by Tayler Buck in the television series Superman & Lois, where she is renamed Natalie Lane Irons and is made the daughter of John and Lois Lane from an alternate universe.

== Publication history ==
Natasha Irons debuted in Steel (Vol. 2) #1 (January 1994).

== Fictional character biography ==
The daughter of Clay and Blondell Irons as well as the sister to Jemahl Irons, she is a member of the Irons family and initially has a vested interest in both dancing and medicine.

In her earlier appearances in the second Steel series written by Louise Simonson and Jon Bogdanove, she is aware of her uncle's identity as Steel and supports him and becomes involved in numerous conflicts in relation to gang and drug-related conflict surrounding the Irons family as well as the re-emergence of John's former employers, AmerTek Industries, who is revealed to manipulate both Jemahl and having sold John's past inventions to the gangs.

During Christopher Priest's tenure as writer of the second Steel series, Natasha is portrayed more stereotypical modern teenager with a flippant attitude. During this time, she meets and befriends a teen named Paul Tomlinson, her father becomes the villain Crash, and a series of tragedies follow the Irons family when John's identity as Steel becomes public, wherein rivals and past adversaries targets the family and leads to the death of Natasha's grandmother and the family faces harassment despite several attempts to relocate. While her relationship with John is tested in wake of their grandmother's death, they reconcile.

Nat later travels with Steel to Metropolis when he establishes Steelworks. She becomes his assistant and succeeds him as the superhero Steel after he is injured in battle. Although reluctant, he allows her to operate under the codename and gifts her with an even more advanced set of armor. One of her earlier adventures as Steel includes a team-up with Cir-El and Traci Thirteen to battle Japanese vigilante Byakko and protect Superman from her mystical-based abilities when he is injured.

=== Becoming Starlight and Vaperlock ===
During the events of 52, Natasha's relationship with John is tested once more due to his disapproval of her activities both personal and as a superhero, culminating to his interference costing her an opportunity to join the Teen Titans and having been made to attend summer school instead of a science colloquium due to having a poor grades in one subject despite passing all others.

After a fierce argument with her uncle, Natasha applies for Lex Luthor's "Everyman Project" and becomes one of the first official subjects. When John, looking for Natasha, threatens to kill Luthor at a Lexcorp party, Natasha appears, along with a team of super-powered people in Luthor's employ, and beats him severely. From that point, she is estranged from her uncle, who makes numerous attempts to contact her, which she rebuffs. Gifted with new skills, Natasha is given the codename Starlight. While in battle, she witnesses her friend Eliza Harmon (Trajectory) killed by Blockbuster. Natasha is finally contacted by John on New Year's Eve, who forces her to rethink everything that Luthor has told her. After the "Rain of the Supermen," in which Lex Luthor deactivates the powers of each Everyman hero outside of Infinity, Inc., Natasha realizes that her uncle was right all along. She then begins working as a double agent within Luthor's organization. However, she is found out and beaten by Luthor, who has acquired superpowers.

The Infinity, Inc. series reveals that the Everyman Project has had a lingering effect on its subjects. Natasha gained the ability to transform into living gas, although she has difficulty controlling it. Her uncle suggests she adopt the codename "Vaporlock." In the final issue of the series, the members of Infinity Inc. are held prisoner in the Dark Side Club. By the end of the Terror Titans miniseries, they are released thanks to Miss Martian.

=== Project 7734 ===
After being released from the Dark Side Club, the members of Infinity Inc. take new names and infiltrate a government project named Project 7734.

Natasha is not sure whom to trust as part of Project: Breach (the brainwashing of Captain Atom). She visits Earth to tell Jimmy Olsen, who has been looking into Project 7734, about Captain Atom and leaves just before Jimmy is found and shot by Codename: Assassin. In the Captain Atom back-up story in Action Comics, Captain Atom remembers who he is, revealing his real name and rank along with the "Codename: Captain Atom".

=== DC Rebirth ===
In the years following the New 52 which retroactively rebooted the mainstream universe and during the DC Rebirth initiative, Natasha's background and history undergoes significant changes with some similarities to the past continuity.

In this continuity, Natasha is the eldest daughter of Clay Irons and a scientific genius who has a close relationship with her uncle John and his girlfriend, Lana Lang, whom she views as an aunt. The pair often looked after Natasha and young Ezekiel in their father's stead, all disapproving of his criminal career as "Crash". When her father scams Skyhook to fund Natasha's scientific endeavors, Ezekiel is kidnapped and her father is arrested and sent to prison. Skyhook remained at large and her brother's missing person case remains unsolved, with no details known of what happen to him afterwards. At some point, she also attended college at a young age, dated sorceress Traci 13, and began assisting John and Lana in their superhero personas as Steel and Superwoman.

During the Superwoman series, Natasha develops a new suit to assist Lana's newfound powers following absorbing strange energies from a deceased version of Superman (seemingly the New 52 Superman) upon his death and assists both Superwoman and Steel while being reacquainted with former girlfriend Traci 13 and adopts the Steel codename. Natasha and John later hunts Skyhook when her father escapes from prison and begins hunting him himself. As the Irons family are drawn to the conflict for revenge, Lana's relation with them is tested when she works to uphold their moral stance against killing.

She later joins the Titans and meets her great-great-uncle, John Henry Jr.

== Characterization ==
=== Description ===
In her initial portrayal in the 1994 Steel series, Natasha is the eldest daughter of Crash, a crime boss who first began as a gang member and mob enforcer. Her younger brother is Jemahl. She is described as a high-school student with an interest in arts and medicine, being a caregiver, ambitious and clever. Over time, the character's intelligence was heighten to be similar to her John Henry's and eventually made a hero. The character was changed to be a super-genius since a young age. Later cited as being one of the smartest people on Earth, Natasha is the eldest daughter of the criminal Crash, a weapons dealer whose actions caused the disappearance of her younger brother (renamed Ezekiel) causes complications and allows for John Henry and Lana Lang to be her surrogate parents. She often acts as assistant for her uncle's company, Steelworks, and concurrently as the second Steel. She is depicted as older, having graduated from college at a young age. One source placed her age at around nineteen.

=== Sexuality ===
Initially, the character was heterosexual and had several male love interests, including Conner Kent and the second Skyman. Following DC Rebirth, the character was made homosexual and had several female love interests, most prominently with Traci 13.

== Powers, abilities, and resources ==
Natasha was originally a student who held an interest in medicine, dance, and politics. Later, she is instead cast as a genius knowledgeable in several scientific fields although she specializes in engineering and computer science, using her expertise to fashion high-powered powered armor that grants her super powers.

Natasha's character also has had super-powers several times; she was granted superhuman strength due to the drug known as "tar" for a short time although it would make her have fits of rage. For a time, Natasha also developed super-powers due to her participation in Lex Luthor's Everyman Project to become an artificial metahuman. Her initial powers granted her superhuman strength and endurance, flight, and the power to control light and solar energies. Later developments following Luthor's deactivation of the treatment instead granted her new powers as a side-effect, allowing her to shift into a gaseous form at will.

=== Equipment and technology ===
An assistant of her uncle at Steelworks, Natasha also has access to advanced technology:

Name	Description
Armors
MK IV Armor	Armor gifted by John Henry which includes protective measures and ability to change size and shape at will.
Chrome Armor	A semi-sentient flexible metal and can change configurations. The suit can also grant superhuman strength, durability, and flight as well as rocket boots.
Chrome Armor	Other configurations also include attachments more apt in dealing with metahumans whom possess superhuman strength.
Other technologies
Chrome	A semi-sentient metal developed by Natasha for various uses and applications.
Chrome	The metal can compress things into a "quantum package" for mobile transport.
Kinetic Hammer	A hammer powered by kinetic energy and configured with the Earth's magnetic field, disallowing use beyond members of the Irons family. Numerous versions and designs vary in size and shape.
Boom Room	A mobile lab and base of operations capable of teleportation using technology derived from New God's boom tubes technology. It once served as the Titan's mobile headquarters.

== Other versions ==
- Natasha Irons / Steel appears as a background character in Kingdom Come.
- An alternate timeline version of Natasha Irons appears in Flashpoint as a member of the Brazilian Army who fights Nazis.
- An anime-inspired Natasha Irons / Steel with superhuman intelligence appears in the Ame-Comi series.
- A teenage version of Natasha Irons appears in Superman Family Adventures as a friend and classmate of Jimmy Olsen.
- An adult version of Natasha Irons / Steel appears in Multiversity as a member of the Justice League of Earth-16.

== In other media ==
=== Television ===
- Natasha Irons appears in TV series set in the DC Animated Universe (DCAU). Introduced in the Superman: The Animated Series episode "Heavy Metal", voiced by Cree Summer, Irons later makes a non-speaking cameo appearance in the Justice League episode "Hereafter".
- A character based on Natasha Irons named Natalie Lane Irons appears in Superman & Lois, portrayed by Tayler Buck. This version is the daughter of John Henry Irons and Lois Lane from a parallel Earth ruled by Kryptonians. After Superman kills Lois, Natalie helps her father build an exo-suit to avenge the latter. At the end of the first season, Natalie unknowingly travels to the main universe. Afterward, she begins dating Bruno Mannheim's son Matteo, joins the Department of Defense Academy, and takes on the codename Starlight.

=== Miscellaneous ===
- Natasha Irons appears in Justice League Unlimited #35.
- Natasha Irons / Steel appears in Injustice 2. This version succeeded John Henry Irons as Steel after he was killed in the Joker's destruction of Metropolis. Following the downfall of Superman's Regime, Natasha helps Batman's Insurgency restore world peace.
