= Hell Hath No Fury =

Hell Hath No Fury may refer to:

== Literature ==
- "Hell hath no fury", an interpreted line based on a quotation from the 1697 play The Mourning Bride by William Congreve
- Hell Hath No Fury, a 1951 novel by Sydney James Bounds, writing as Rex Marlowe
- Hell Hath No Fury, a 1953 crime novel by Charles Williams
- Hell Hath No Fury, a 1956 novel by Kathleen Lindsay, writing as Mary Richmond
- Hell Hath No Fury (German: Der Hahn ist tot), a 1996 novel by Ingrid Noll
- Hell Hath No Fury, a 2007 novel by David Weber and Linda Evans
- Hell Hath No Fury, a 2013 novel by Rosie Harris
- Hell Hath No Fury, a 2018 novel by Jo Ho
- "Hell Hath No Fury", a chapter in volume 10 of the manga Beastars by Paru Itagaki

== Television ==
- Hell Hath No Fury (film), a 1991 TV film
- "Hell Hath No Fury" (Castle), a 2009 episode
- "Hell Hath No Fury" (Charmed), a 2001 episode
- "Hell Hath No Fury" (La Femme Nikita), a 2000 episode
- "Hell Hath No Fury" (GCB), a 2012 episode
- "Hell Hath No Fury" (Scandal), a 2012 episode

== Music ==
=== Albums ===
- Hell Hath No Fury (Clipse album), 2006
- Hell Hath No Fury (Rock Goddess album), 1983
- Hell Hath No Fury (Civet album), 2008

=== Songs ===
- "Hell Hath No Fury", song by Frankie Laine and Cahn Brodszky
- "Hell Hath No Fury", song by Rock Goddess (1984)
- "Hell Hath No Fury", song by Klute (2007)
- "Hel Hath No Fury", song by Týr (2013)
- "Hell Hath No Fury", song by Youngblood Supercult (2016)
- "Hell Hath No Fury", song by Blues Saraceno (2018)

== See also ==
- Hell Hath No Fury Like a Woman Scorned, a 2014 musical play by Tyler Perry
- "Like a Woman Scorned", a 2019 song by Theo Katzman
- Hell Hath Fury (disambiguation)
