= Psi (comics) =

- Psi as depicted in Forever Evil: A.R.G.U.S. #4 (March 2014). Art by Neil Edwards.

Publication information
- Publisher: DC Comics
- First appearance: The Daring New Adventures of Supergirl #1 (November 1982)
- Created by: Paul Kupperberg (writer); Carmine Infantino (artist)

In-story information
- Full name: Gayle Marsh
- Team affiliations: Suicide Squad; Black Lantern Corps
- Abilities: Psychic; Psychic ability to trigger fear in others; Psychokinesis; Telekinesis; Teleportation; Telepathy; Empathy; Energy manipulation; Energy projection; Energy absorption; Matter transmutation; Matter disintegration; Flight

Psi (Gayle Marsh) is a supervillain appearing in American comic books published by DC Comics, primarily as an enemy of Supergirl. She was created by Paul Kupperberg and Carmine Infantino, and first appeared in The Daring New Adventures of Supergirl #1 (November 1982).

== Fictional character biography ==
Gayle Marsh is an orphan who developed psychic powers, primarily telekinesis, at the age of twelve. After her parents died, she was raised by the scientist David Pendergast. As Psi, Marsh battles Supergirl several times, believing her to be the villain Decay. When Psi fails to defeat Supergirl, Pendergast attempts to kill her and she lashes out, turning him into the monster Decay. After Pendergast battles Supergirl, Psi appears and reverts him to his human form.

Psi’s first appearance in the post-Crisis DC Universe was as a member of the Suicide Squad. She has no memory of her real name or history after an unknown event nearly destroyed her mind and joined the Suicide Squad while seeking to reclaim her lost memories. Psi accompanies Rick Flag and the Suicide Squad in a mission in Central America, but is killed by the Rocket Red Brigade. As she dies, Psi remembers her real name, Gayle Marsh, as well as her parents.

During the events of Blackest Night, Psi is reanimated as a member of the Black Lantern Corps alongside several other dead Suicide Squad members. Psi is apparently destroyed by the Manhunter's self-destruct mechanism, which releases an explosion of Green Lantern energy that eradicates the Black Lanterns.

Psi is reintroduced following The New 52 reboot, where she appears as a prisoner of A.R.G.U.S. Steve Trevor and Killer Frost visit her cell to see if she can disrupt the Firestorm matrix in order to free the trapped Justice League members. When Psi touches him, Trevor is flooded with images, which connects his pre-existing knowledge together and tells him how to save the Justice League.

== In other media ==
- Psi appears in Supergirl, portrayed by Yael Grobglas. This version was "a law-abiding citizen of Skokie, Illinois" until she "snapped" and began robbing banks.
  - A separate incarnation of Psi appears in the tie-in digital comic Adventures of Supergirl. This version is a Kryptonian psychic who works in the maximum security prison Fort Rozz, controlling the prisoners' dreams to secure their mental health.
