= Hell Hath Fury =

Hell Hath Fury may refer to:

- Hell Hath Fury (anthology), an anthology of fantasy fiction short stories
- "Hell Hath Fury", an episode of Garth Marenghi's Darkplace
- "Hell Hath Fury", a short story by Cleve Cartmill

== See also ==
- Hell Hath No Fury (disambiguation)
