= A Woman Scorned (1999 film) =

- Directed by: Treva Etienne
- Produced by: Treva Etienne
- Starring: Marcia Johnson
- Music by: Mark Snow
- Release date: 1999
- Running time: 8 minutes
- Country: United States
- Language: English

A Woman Scorned is a 1999 short thriller directed by Treva Etienne and starring Marcia Johnson.

== Premise ==
A woman intends to terrorize the family of a rival businessman of her late husband. She is employed by the family after they advertise for a private tutor for their son. After making sexual advances on him, she then turns her attention to the rest of the household.
