= Superman character and cast =

Superman, given the serial nature of comic publishing and the length of the character's existence, has evolved as a character as his adventures have increased. Initially a crime fighter, the character was seen in early adventures stepping in to stop wife beaters and gangsters, with rather rough edges and a rather looser moral code than audiences may be used to today. Modern writers have softened the character, and instilled a sense of idealism and moral code of conduct.

Superman's secret identity Clark Kent, initially based somewhat on Harold Lloyd, has also been updated over the years. During the 1970s, the character left the Daily Planet for a time to work for television, whilst the 1980s revamp by John Byrne saw the character become somewhat more aggressive. This aggressiveness has since faded with subsequent creators restoring the mild mannerisms traditional to the character.

Superman's powers have developed, and his adventures have accumulated, far beyond the Fleischer cartoon's intonation of a character "faster than a speeding bullet, more powerful than a locomotive, and able to leap tall buildings in a single bound." Initially the character could not fly, but this ability and many more have added to the character's appeal. Superman's weakness to kryptonite, now well established, was introduced quite late in the character's history, first appearing in the radio series in 1943. Superman's large cast of supporting characters includes Lois Lane, Jimmy Olsen, and Perry White, while many adventures have seen the character pitted against villains such as Lex Luthor, Brainiac, and Doomsday.

== Fictional biography ==
Art from Superman vol. 2, #75 (January 1993), where Superman dies in Lois Lane's arms. Pencils by Dan Jurgens.

The details of Superman's origin, relationships, and abilities changed significantly during the course of the character's publication, from what is considered the Golden Age through the Modern Age of comics. The powers and villains were developed through the 1940s, including Superman's ability to fly, and costumed villains introduced in 1941. The character was shown as learning of the existence of Krypton in 1949. The concept itself had originally been established to the reader in 1939, in the Superman comic strip.

The 1960s saw the introduction of a second Superman, Kal-L. DC Comics had established a multiverse within the fictional universe its characters shared. This allowed characters published in the 1940s to exist alongside their updated counterparts published in the 1960s. This was explained to the reader through the notion that the two groups of characters inhabited parallel Earths. The second Superman was introduced to explain to the reader Superman's membership of both the 1940s superhero team the Justice Society of America and the 1960s superhero team the Justice League of America.

The 1980s saw radical revisions of the character. DC Comics decided to remove the multiverse in a bid to simplify its comics line. This led to the rewriting of the back story of all DC characters, Superman included. John Byrne rewrote Superman, removing many established conventions and characters from continuity, including Superboy and Supergirl. Byrne also re-established Superman's adoptive parents, Jonathan and Martha Kent, as characters. In the previous continuity, the characters had been written as having died early in Superman's life (about the time of Clark Kent's graduation from high school).

The 1990s saw Superman apparently killed by the villain Doomsday, although the character was soon resurrected. Superman married Lois Lane in 1996. In the 2000s, Superman becomes a vegetarian, and his origin is again revisited in 2004. In 2006, Superman is stripped of his powers, although these are restored within a fictional year.

== Personality and character ==
In the Golden Age stories, Superman's personality is rough and destructive. Although nowhere near as cold-blooded as the early Batman, the Superman featured in the comics of the 1930s and 1940s is unconcerned about tossing evildoers around in such a manner that fatalities would logically be almost inevitable (although seldom or never shown on the page). His actions were more socially conscious, such as declaring war on reckless drivers, fighting against the mistreatment of prisoners, or tearing down insufficient housing so that the government would be forced to build new homes.

His adoptive human parents, the Kents, imbued young Clark Kent with a strong sense of purpose, morality, and compassion. Superman was raised to believe that his abilities are gifts not to be abused. In many ways, he is the perfect hero, as he embodies all the best traits that people would believe to see in themselves. Unlike the Golden Age Superman, this Superman dislikes killing and vows to "never take a life", and to retire if he ever does. All the same, when General Zod taunts Superman in the 1982 miniseries The Phantom Zone for his resolve, Superman responds, "My code doesn't say a damned thing about not battering you to within an inch of yours!."

Recent writers have attempted to deepen Superman's persona and provide a rationale for his goodness. Superman is often depicted with a mix of idealism, restraint, fairness, and compassion. The Birthright limited series attributes Superman's compassion for living things to his ability to see their "auras". He also struggles with the differences between what is right and what is practical.

Survivor's guilt has also been cited as a basis for Superman's morality; as the (nearly) sole survivor of an extinct race eradicated by a natural disaster that his people, and more specifically his father, were powerless to prevent. Now possessing nearly unlimited power himself, he feels additional responsibility to behave in a compassionate and protective manner to others similarly threatened.

In Superman/Batman #3, Batman thinks, "It is a remarkable dichotomy. In many ways, Clark is the most human of us all. Then ... he shoots fire from the skies, and it is difficult not to think of him as a god. And how fortunate we all are that it does not occur to him." In the Modern Age of comics, the relationship between Bruce Wayne and Clark Kent has at times been strained by their differing ideologies, which results from their drastically different backgrounds and upbringing. However, they have come to recognize each other as not only the most trusted of allies, but great friends, with Batman being the one person Superman trusted with Lex Luthor's kryptonite ring in order for someone to be able to stop Superman should he ever go rogue.

=== Clark Kent ===
Clark Kent is the secret identity of Superman. Clark, as opposed to Superman, is traditionally presented as behaving in a more introverted or mild manner compared to his super-heroic self. John Byrne's Man of Steel revamp drops many traditional aspects of Clark Kent in favor of giving him a more aggressive and extroverted personality, including making Kent a top football player in high school and a successful author. Subsequent revamps have restored the more mild-mannered Clark Kent that is traditionally associated with the character.

Clark is a reporter at the Metropolis newspaper the Daily Planet, which allows him to keep track of events in which he might be able to help. Fellow reporter Lois Lane is often the object of Clark's affection. Lois's affection for Superman and rejection of Clark is a recurring theme in Superman comics and media adaptations.

In the Modern Age comics Superman considers himself Clark Kent first and Superman second. Before the Crisis on Infinite Earths (i.e., DC comics published up to the early 1980s), the attitude was that Clark Kent was actually a "secret identity" for Superman. In an adventure published in the 1960s, when staff at the Daily Planet go on strike. He seriously considers it a chance to try out a new identity in case he has to "abandon [his] Clark Kent role permanently." His options included becoming a full-time policeman or a mere tramp "whom no one would ever suspect of being the Man of Steel."

Clark keeps his Superman identity a secret to protect his loved ones. Various methods for keeping his secret over the years include wearing eyeglasses and "super-hypnosis", subliminally preventing people from making the connection; or if they did, sometimes resorting to outright erasing their memories. He also compresses his spine as Clark Kent to become shorter, and studies the Meisner acting technique to switch seamlessly between personas.

Modern comic book stories show that to the average observer, Superman is the greatest hero in the world and a larger-than-life figure. The fact that he is without a mask in his Superman persona gives the impression to ordinary civilians that he is without a "secret identity", which prevents suspicion. When first confronted by evidence that Clark Kent is Superman, Lex Luthor dismisses it, saying, "No one with the power of Superman would be living as a normal man."

=== Progeny ===
Superman's Kryptonian physiology has been a matter of serious and humorous discussion, such as in Larry Niven's essay Man of Steel, Woman of Kleenex. The novelization of the comics storyline The Death of Superman, The Death and Life of Superman by Roger Stern, suggests that Superman's alien DNA has far too many and far too complex chromosomes. The 1998 crossover story DC One Million, reveals Superman as the progenitor of a dynasty of part-Kryptonian protectors of the Earth, reference is made in the series of him marrying a fifth-dimensional queen in the 67th century and adding extra powers to his bloodline. Superman is portrayed as a father for the first time in canonical continuity, when he and his wife Lois become the foster parents of a Kryptonian boy, whom they named Chris Kent. These versions of Superman and Lois Lane eventually have a biological son, Jonathan Samuel Kent, in the Convergence series.

Examples of Superman biologically fathering children in imaginary, alternate realities, or elseworlds stories includes, a daughter named Ariella Kent with Linda Danvers from an alternate timeline. A son named Jonathan Elliot with Lois Lane in Superman: Whatever Happened to the Man of Tomorrow?. A son named Jonathan Kent II with Wonder Woman in Kingdom Come and The Kingdom. A son named Jon Kent with Lois in the graphic novel Son of Superman and a daughter named Lola with Lois in Superman's Pal Jimmy Olsen #117. A son named Larry with Lois in Superman's Girl Friend Lois Lane #39. Five children over the span of time covered in the Superman & Batman: Generations series. A daughter named Laura Kent with Lois in Superman Family #200; A daughter named Laney with Lois in Superman #215. A super-genius baby with Lois in Superman Family #224. A woman from an alternate future named Cir-El who claims to be Superman's daughter with Lois Lane (though Cir-El is later revealed to have been artificially engineered by Brainiac 13 using the DNA of her supposed natural parents); a future glimpse (via Mister Mxyzptlk) of a potential daughter named Lara in Adventures of Superman #638 and others.

Another possible future/alternate reality son is Clark Kent, Jr. who takes on the identity of Superman Jr. He was featured in the series, World's Finest Comics. Teamed with Batman Jr., the duo were known as the Super-Sons. The mothers of the Super-Sons were never revealed by name and their faces were always hidden.

In the 2006 film Superman Returns, Lois Lane has a son, Jason White, who was later revealed as Superman's son. In the film, Jason is shown to have superpowers, which he displays after he is put under stress to save his mother Lois.

== Powers and abilities ==
As an influential archetype of the superhero genre, Superman possesses extraordinary powers, with the character traditionally described as "faster than a speeding bullet, more powerful than a locomotive, and able to leap tall buildings in a single bound," a phrase coined by Jay Morton and first used in the Superman radio serials and Max Fleischer animated shorts of the 1940s, as well as the television series of the 1950s. For most of his existence, Superman's famous arsenal of powers has included flight, super-strength, invulnerability, super-speed, vision powers (including x-ray vision, laser eye, heat, telescopic, infra-red, and microscopic vision), super-photographic memory, super-hearing, and super-breath, which enables him to freeze objects by blowing on them, as well as exert the propulsive force of high-speed winds.

As originally conceived and presented in his early stories, Superman's powers were relatively limited, consisting of superhuman strength that allowed him to lift a car over his head, run at amazing speeds, and leap one-eighth of a mile, as well as incredibly tough skin that could be pierced by nothing less than an exploding artillery shell. The character's creators, Jerry Siegel and Joe Shuster, compared his strength and leaping abilities to an ant and a grasshopper. When making the cartoons, the Fleischer brothers found it difficult to keep animating him leaping and requested to DC to change his ability to flying. Writers gradually increased his powers to larger extents during the Silver Age, in which Superman could fly to other worlds and galaxies, and even across universes with relative ease. He would often fly across the Solar System to stop meteors from hitting the Earth, or sometimes just to clear his head. Writers found it increasingly difficult to write Superman stories in which the character was believably challenged, so DC Comics made a series of attempts to rein the character in. The most significant attempt, John Byrne's 1986 rewrite, established several hard limits on his abilities, such as that he barely survives a nuclear blast, and his space flights are limited by how long he can hold his breath.

The source of Superman's powers changes subtly over the course of his history. It is originally said that Superman's abilities derive from his Kryptonian heritage, making him eons more evolved than humans. Soon after, it is established that Krypton's gravity had been stronger than Earth's, a situation similar to that of Edgar Rice Burroughs' John Carter. As Superman becomes increasingly god-like, the implication that all Kryptonians had possessed the same abilities became problematic for writers, making it doubtful that a race of such beings could have been wiped out by something as trifling as an exploding planet. In part to counter this, the Superman writers established that Kryptonians, whose native star had been red, only possessed superpowers under the light of a yellow sun. More recent stories have attempted to find a balance between the two explanations.

Superman is most vulnerable to kryptonite, mineral debris from Krypton transformed into radioactive material by the forces that destroyed the planet. Exposure to kryptonite radiation nullifies Superman's powers and immobilizes him with pain; prolonged exposure will eventually destroy him. The only mineral on Earth that can protect him from Kryptonite is lead, which blocks the radiation. Green kryptonite is the most commonly seen form, but writers introduced other forms over the years, such as red, gold, blue, and black, each with its own effect.

== Characters ==
=== Supporting characters ===
Lois Lane is perhaps the character most commonly associated with Superman, being portrayed at different times as his colleague, competitor, friend, love interest and wife.

Other supporting characters include Daily Planet photographer Jimmy Olsen, editor-in-chief Perry White, gossip columnist Cat Grant, political editorialist Ron Troupe, and sports reporter Steve Lombard. Clark Kent's adopted parents, Jonathan and Martha Kent, childhood best friend Lana Lang and Pete Ross.

Incarnations of Supergirl, Krypto the Superdog, and Superboy have also been major allies in the mythos, as well as the Justice League of America and the Super Friends (of which Superman is usually a member and most of the time, the leader).

Team-ups with fellow comics icon Batman are a fan-favorite, inspiring many stories over the years. When paired, they are often referred to as the "World's Finest" in a nod to the World's Finest Comics series that mostly featured team-up stories between Superman and Batman during its 45-year history. In 2003, DC Comics began to publish a new series featuring the two characters titled Superman/Batman.

Minor supporting characters over the years have included Superman's technological aids and eccentric inventors Professor Emil Hamilton and Professor Phineas Potter; Metropolis police officers Inspector William Henderson, Maggie Sawyer, and Dan Turpin; and former boxer-turned-bartender Bibbo Bibbowski.

A feature shared by several supporting characters is alliterative names, especially with the initials "LL", such as Lex Luthor, Lois Lane, Linda Lee, Lana Lang, Lori Lemaris, and Lucy Lane. Alliterative names were common in early comics.

=== Superboy ===
There have been a number of characters called Superboy. The original Superboy, introduced in 1944's More Fun Comics #101, represented "the adventures of Superman when he was a boy." This Superboy is no longer in publication, as post-Crisis continuity deemed that Clark Kent did not become a costumed superhero until he reached adulthood. A new Superboy, Superman's clone Conner Kent, was created in the early 1990s. The Superboy name has also been the name of denizens of other dimensions, such as one from a "pocket universe" parallel dimension in the late 1980s post-Crisis Superman comics, and several individuals the modern Superboy encounters during his trip through Hypertime (one of those essentially being the original Superboy).

=== Teams ===
Team Superman joins forces with the Batman Family.

Superman was an honorary member of the Justice Society of America during the Golden Age of comics. In the annual Justice League/Justice Society crossover stories of the Silver Age, the Superman of Earth-2 began participating in JSA adventures on a more regular basis. Since Infinite Crisis, members of the JSA have regained their memories of the Golden Age version of Superman. In September 2011, The New 52 rebooted DC's continuity. In this new timeline, Superman was not a member of this team.

The Legion of Super-Heroes was originally said to have been inspired by the 20th century adventures of Superboy. During the Silver Age, Superboy would travel through time to the 30th century and take part in their adventures. Post-Crisis, Superman's history as Superboy and involvement with the Legion were written out of continuity. In the New 52 timeline, Superman was a member of the Legion when he was young.

Superman has been a member, often a founding member, of almost every incarnation of the Justice League of America. His membership history with the League has fluctuated with various changes in continuity. In the New 52 timeline, he is a founding member of the team.

"Team Superman" is the name of DC Comics' informal team of heroes who all wear the "S" shield of Superman. This team was officially called "Team Superman" in Team Superman: Secret Files and Origins #1 (May 1998). This team assembles whenever Superman himself is in trouble, if a situation calls for more power than Superman has (such as when fighting Darkseid), or if Superman is gone and needs someone to fill in for him. The team has had different members over the years, but the members are always super-powered and very close to Superman. There was a single comic, Team Superman #1, published in July 1999 in which Superman himself was abducted by an alien "hero killer".

=== Kent family history ===
Pre-Crisis, Superman's foster parents, Jonathan and Martha Kent, died in the summer after his high school graduation; post-Crisis, the Kents are alive and well and are regularly visited by Clark, who relies on them for advice in difficult times.

In the 1997 mini-series The Kents, the Kent family's 19th century ancestors were portrayed as noted abolitionists who assisted the personnel of the Underground Railroad, such as Harriet Tubman. The family moved to the territory of Kansas during the infamous Bleeding Kansas period to promote the cause of creating a free state by running a newspaper for the region.

Unfortunately, the family patriarch was murdered by Border Ruffians who wanted to silence him. Furthermore, the sons, Nathaniel and Jeb, argued and had a parting of the ways so deeply involving their beliefs about slavery that they found themselves on opposing sides of the American Civil War, with Jeb fighting with the notorious Confederate guerrilla unit led by William Quantrill. Nathaniel fought for the North and married a half-Native American woman who gave him a special traditional spiritual symbol that was apparently a forerunner and inspiration for Superman's chest emblem. After the war, Nathaniel became a sheriff in Smallville, while Jeb became the leader of a group of bandits. Eventually, Jeb discovered he had a son out of wedlock years ago, and allowed him to join his gang. Unfortunately, his son turned out to be a murderous sociopath and Jeb approached his estranged brother to arrange a trap to stop him.

Regrettably, in springing the trap, the son mortally wounded his father before being killed himself, and Jeb fully reconciled with Nate before dying. Nate remained in Smallville and there the Kents have stayed for generations, including Jonathan and Martha Kent, Superman's adoptive parents.

=== Villains ===
Superman also has a rogues gallery of enemies, including his most well-known nemesis, Lex Luthor, who has been envisioned over the years in various forms as either a rogue scientific genius with a personal vendetta against Superman, or a powerful and corrupt CEO of a conglomerate called LexCorp. In the 2000s, he even becomes President of the United States, and has been depicted at various stages, as well as currently, as a childhood friend of Clark Kent.

The robotic alien Brainiac is considered by some as the second most effective enemy of Superman. The enemy that accomplished the most, by actually killing Superman, is the monster Doomsday. Darkseid, one of the most powerful beings in the DC Universe, is also a formidable nemesis in most post-Crisis comics.

Other enemies of note include the demon Satanus, the fifth-dimensional imp Mr. Mxyzptlk, the Ultra-Humanite, the imperfect Superman clone or duplicate Bizarro, criminal cyborg Metallo, the Female Furies, Kryptonian criminal General Zod (and other Kryptonians imprisoned in the Phantom Zone for their crimes), Parasite, Prankster, Cyborg Superman, Terra-Man, Toyman, Composite Superman, Gog, and the gang Intergang.
