= Youngblood Supercult =

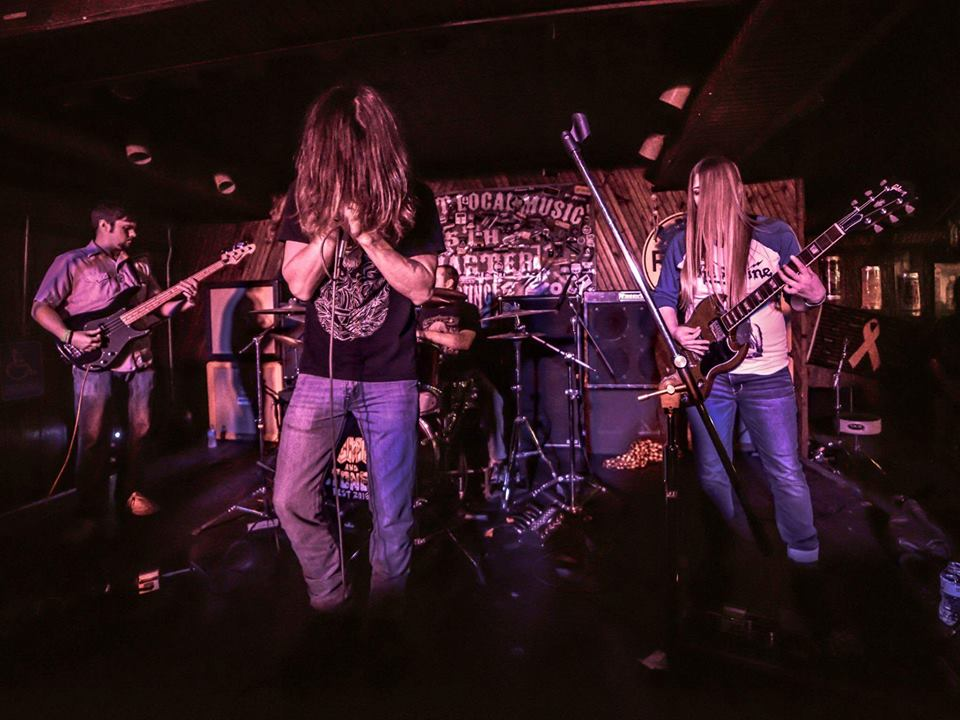
- Performing at Doomed & Stoned Fest 2016

Background information
- Origin: Topeka, Kansas, United States
- Genres: stoner rock, blues rock
- Years active: 2013–2019
- Labels: DHU Records, The Company
- Past members: Bailey Smith; David Merrill; Weston Alford; Brad Morris; Coder Potts; Wyatt Desch

Youngblood Supercult was an American stoner rock band from Topeka, Kansas, United States. The band's line-up consists of Bailey Smith (guitar), David Merrill (vocals), Weston Alford (drums), and Brad Morris (bass). The group has been categorized as hard rock, stoner rock, and heavy blues. Their second album, High Plains (2016) garnered substantial reviews and ranked at number two on the label and critic-backed Doom Charts for March 2016. They have been consistently touring various U.S. cities since their latest release, and have signed to DHU Records for a limited vinyl release of High Plains. Their third studio album, The Great American Death Rattle, was released on August 17, 2017, and has garnered critical acclaim in the stoner/doom community.

== History ==
Youngblood Supercult formed in the wake of the splintering of several different bands located on the desolate plains of northeast Kansas. The four original members – Bailey Smith, Weston Alford, Coder Potts, and Wyatt Desch – entered the Topeka music scene with their debut in the NOTO Arts District on September 6, 2013.

After several shows, the four musicians went to Alexander Lancaster's Two Wolves Studio in downtown Topeka to record their debut album, Season of the Witch, under the direction of producer and friend, David Steinlage. Jerry Tubb of Austin's Terra Nova Studios mastered the album, and the band recruited designer Pol Abran of Branca Studio in Barcelona to oversee the album art. Heavy Planet praised the album in their review: "Straight out of Topeka, Kansas comes four riff-worshipping bandmates that unite their love of seventies heavy blues, occult-ish doom rock, and a free and easy vibe in what they like to call Stoner-lite. I would have to say that their sound would not qualify as "lite" in my book, in someone else's, maybe. The band's first single "Season of the Witch" is a slithering, hard-driving, and catchy tune that wraps around a tight groove. The vocals reign supreme with their bravado and mighty soaring ability. Youngblood Supercult has played alongside fellow Topekans and Heavy Planet favorite The Midnight Ghost Train. The band has a very straightforward approach and a strong desire to make a name for themselves. Give Youngblood Supercult a listen, you'll be glad you did."

Following the release of Season of the Witch, vocalist Wyatt Desch left the group to focus on other endeavors, and they were joined by their current vocalist, David Merrill. This transition marked a new era for the group. They wrote feverishly, departing from their previous driving heavy rock sound in favor of experimenting with elements of folk, blues, psych, and the droning, flat-tuned, off-time riffs that are the trademark of the traditional classic heavy stoner sound.

Critical response to their music was positive. As a result of creative differences between Coder and the rest of the group, David recorded basslines on High Plains. After peacefully severing professional ties with their bassist, Youngblood Supercult consolidated into a three-piece group as David began to work on simultaneous vocals and bass.

The group released their second album High Plains on February 19, 2016, an album which has already received online and FM airplay on 105.9 KISS FM and 97.5 The Quake as well as critical acclaim from music blog administrators such as The Obelisk's JJ Koczan, who wrote: "Midwestern fuzz ideologues Youngblood Supercult release their sophomore full-length, High Plains, on Feb. 19. An 11-track/48-minute CD with double-vinyl impending for this summer, it follows early 2014’s debut, Season of the Witch, and marks a significant change in vibe on the part of the graphic-design-inclined Topeka, Kansas, three-piece. Where the debut took a classic metal bent toward heavy rock, more straightforward and rhythmically driving, High Plains offers plenty of sonic weight—the guitar and bass working together on “Black Hawk,” or the clawing “Nomad” earlier on—but takes a more lurching, atmospheric approach overall. This seems to have been a purposeful shift in aesthetic as much as one of lineup, but either way, it suits them." More recently, the group picked up bassist Brad Morris in an effort to expand the band's musical capabilities. In the spring of 2017, they finished recording their third studio album, The Great American Death Rattle and the album was released on August 17, 2017.

It was announced in May 2019 via Facebook that the band was no more.

== Members ==
- Bailey Smith – guitar (2011-2019)
- David Merrill – vocals (2014-2019), bass (2015-2016)
- Weston Alford – drums (2011-2019)
- Brad Morris – bass (2016-2018)
- Coder Potts – bass (2012–2015)
- Wyatt Desch – vocals (2013–2014)

== Member History ==
In March 2026, Weston Alford was arrested on charges of distribution of methamphetamine. https://www.wibw.com/2026/03/08/topeka-man-arrested-connection-with-meth-distribution-part-drug-investigation/

In February 2020, Bailey Smith was arrested on charges of aggravated assault. https://www.cjonline.com/story/news/legal-notices/2020/02/07/police-calls-update-for-feb-7-2020/1747716007/

== Discography ==
- Season of the Witch (2014)
- High Plains (2016)
- The Great American Death Rattle (2017)
