= Supergirl =

DC Comics superheroine

- Iterations of Supergirl: Kara Zor-El (top left), Matrix (top right), Linda Danvers (bottom left), and Cir-El (bottom right)
- Publisher: DC Comics
- First appearance: As Super-Girl: Superman #123 (August 1958); As Supergirl: Action Comics #252 (May 1959)
- Created by: Kara Zor-El: Created by Otto Binder and Al Plastino; Kara Zor-L: Created by Gerry Conway, Ric Estrada and Wally Wood; Matrix: Created by John Byrne; Linda Danvers: Created by Peter David and Gary Frank; Cir-El: Created by Steven Seagle and Scott McDaniel; Ariella Kent: Created by Peter David and Dusty Abell
- Characters: Kara Zor-El; Matrix; Linda Danvers; Cir-El; Power Girl; Ariella Kent

Supergirl is the name of several superheroines appearing in American comic books published by DC Comics. The original Supergirl is Kara Zor-El, the cousin of superhero Superman. The character made her first appearance in Action Comics #252 (May 1959) and was created by Otto Binder and Al Plastino.

After the appearance of Kara Zor-El, the original Supergirl, other characters have taken up the mantle of Supergirl, sometimes at the same time, including Matrix, Linda Danvers and Cir-El.

== Concept ==
Created as a female counterpart to Superman, Kara Zor-El shares his superpowers and vulnerability to Kryptonite. Supergirl plays a supporting role in various DC Comics publications, including Action Comics, Superman, and several comic book series unrelated to Superman. In 1969, Supergirl's adventures became the lead feature in Adventure Comics, and she later starred in an eponymous comic book series which debuted in 1972 and ran until 1974, followed by a second monthly comic book series, The Daring New Adventures of Supergirl, which ran from 1982 to 1984. Supergirl was originally introduced in Action Comics #252 as the cousin of the publisher's flagship superhero, Superman in the story The Supergirl from Krypton. In most depictions, she is an alien from the planet Krypton, possessing a multitude of superhuman abilities derived from the rays of the yellow Sun. Other mainstream characters have taken the name Supergirl over the years, with decidedly non-extraterrestrial origins, such as that of a superhuman artificial life-form. The 2016 miniseries Supergirl: Being Super written by Mariko Tamaki and penciled by Joelle Jones is a coming-of-age take on Supergirl's origins. It depicts Kara as a seemingly ordinary teenager living in the rural Midvale with the Danvers, since the couple found her inside a pod in the middle of a field. Kara grows up aware of the pod and her unknown origins (which are glimpsed in dreams) and struggles to live a normal life as she discovers her abilities, which she keeps a secret even from her closest friends.

Because of changing editorial policy at DC, Supergirl was killed off in the 1985 event Crisis on Infinite Earths. DC Comics subsequently rebooted the continuity of the DC Comics Universe, re-establishing Superman as the sole survivor of Krypton's destruction. Post-Crisis, several characters unrelated to Superman assume the role of Supergirl, including Matrix, Linda Danvers, and Cir-El. Following the cancellation of the third Supergirl comic book series (1996–2003), which starred the Matrix/Linda Danvers version of the character, a modern version of Kara Zor-El was reintroduced into the DC Comics continuity in Superman/Batman. This modern Kara Zor-El stars as Supergirl in an eponymous comic book series and additionally in a supporting role in various other DC Comics publications.

Since her initial comic book appearances, the character later branched out into animation, film, television, and merchandising. In May 2011, Supergirl placed 94th on IGN's list of the Top 100 Comic Book Heroes of All Time. In November 2013, the character placed 17th on IGN's list of the Top 25 Heroes of DC Comics.

== Precursors ==
Super-Girl on the cover of Superman #123: Super-Girl (August 1958) Art by Curt Swan

- Superwoman – The first comic to feature a female counterpart to Superman is "Lois Lane – Superwoman", a story published in Action Comics #60 (May 1943), in which a hospitalized Lois dreams she has gained Kryptonesque superpowers thanks to a blood transfusion from the Man of Steel. She begins her own career as Superwoman, complete with copycat costume. Similar stories with Lois Lane acquiring such powers and adopting the name "Superwoman" periodically appeared later. One such story is in Action Comics #156 (May 1951), in which Lois accidentally gains those powers through an invention of Superman's arch-foe, Lex Luthor. In the story, Lois wears a short blond wig in her crime-fighting identity, giving her an appearance almost identical to the later version of Supergirl after the latter's real name was specified as Kara Zor-El.
- Supergirl – In Superboy #5 (November–December 1949) in a story titled "Superboy Meets Supergirl", Superboy meets Queen Lucy of the fictional Latin American nation of Borgonia. She is a stellar athlete and scholar. Tired of her duties and wanting to enjoy a normal life, Queen Lucy travels to Smallville, where she meets Superboy and soon wins his heart. Superboy puts on a show with her where he uses his powers to make her seem superhuman; during this contest, she is called Supergirl. As Supergirl, Queen Lucy wears a tan dress with a brown cape and Superboy's "S" symbol. Superboy later saves her from a scheming minister. She returns to her throne, leaving Superboy to wonder if she ever thinks of him.
- Super-Sister – In the Superboy #78 story titled "Claire Kent, Alias Super-Sister", Superboy saves an alien woman named Shar-La from a life-threatening crash. After he ridicules her driving, Shar-La turns Superboy into a girl. In Smallville, Clark Kent (Superboy's alter ego) claims to be Claire Kent, an out-of-town relative who is staying with the Kents. When in costume, he plays Superboy's sister, Super-Sister, and claims the two have exchanged places. As a girl ridiculed and scorned by men, he wants to prove he is as good as he always was. In the end, it is revealed that the transformation is just an illusion created by Shar-La. Superboy learns not to ridicule women.
- Super-Girl – In Superman #123 (August 1958), Jimmy Olsen uses a magic totem to wish a "Super-Girl" into existence as a companion and helper for Superman; however, the two frequently get in each other's way until she is fatally injured protecting Superman from a Kryptonite meteor that a criminal has dropped towards him. At her insistence, Jimmy wishes the dying girl out of existence. DC used this story to gauge public response to the concept of a completely new female counterpart to Superman. In the original issue, she has blond hair and her costume is blue and red like Superman's; indeed, it closely resembles the uniform that actress Helen Slater would later wear in the 1984 film Supergirl. Early reprints of this story show her with red hair and an orange and green costume to prevent readers from confusing her with the then current Supergirl character. Much later, the story was again reprinted in its original form.

== Original character: Kara ==
=== Debut ===
After positive fan reaction to Super-Girl, the first recurring and most familiar version of Supergirl debuted in the year 1959. Kara Zor-El first appeared in Action Comics #252 (May 1959). The story that introduced the character was drawn by Al Plastino and written by Otto Binder. Years earlier, Binder had co-created Mary Marvel, the sister of Captain Marvel. Like Supergirl, Mary Marvel was a teenage female version of an adult male superhero, wearing a costume that was identical to the older character's other than substituting a short skirt for tight trousers. (Binder also created Marvel Comics' Miss America, a superhero who shared little other than the name with her sometime co-star Captain America.)

Reaction to Supergirl's first appearance was tremendous, with thousands of positive letters pouring into the DC Comics offices.

Issue #8 of the Superman/Batman series originally published in 2004 re-introduced Kara Zor-El into the DC continuity. Like the pre-Crisis version, this Kara claims to be the daughter of Superman's uncle Zor-El and aunt Alura In-Ze. Unlike the traditional Supergirl, Kara is born before Superman; she is a teenager when he is a baby. She is sent in a rocket in suspended animation to look after the infant Kal-El; however, her rocket is caught in the explosion of Krypton and becomes encased in a Kryptonite asteroid. She arrives on Earth years after Kal-El, who has grown and become known as Superman. Owing to this extended period of suspended animation, she is "younger" than her cousin. At the end of "The Supergirl from Krypton" arc, Superman officially introduces her to all the heroes of the DC Comics Universe. She adopts the Supergirl costume and accepts the name.

A new Supergirl series, written by Jeph Loeb, began publication in August 2005. The storyline in the first arc of Supergirl depicts a darker, evil version of Kara emerging when Lex Luthor exposes her to Black Kryptonite. The evil Supergirl implies that Kara's family sent her to Earth to kill Kal-El as revenge for a family grudge. At the time, Kara herself refuses to believe this, but later flashbacks indicate that not only is this partly true, but Kara had been physically altered by her father as a child before being involved in several murders on Krypton. However, these matters were later revealed to be delusions as a result of Kryptonite poisoning. Upon being cured, she presents a personality more like that of her Silver Age persona.

=== Biography ===
Supergirl is introduced to the world on the cover of Action Comics #285 (February 1962) Art by Curt Swan

Kara Zor-El (so named because on Krypton, women take the full name of their fathers) is the last survivor of Argo City, which had survived the explosion of the planet Krypton and drifted through space. The city had been covered by a plastic dome for weather moderation, devised by Zor-El, the younger brother of Jor-El, a climatologist and engineer, the father of Superman (Kal-El). The dome held together a large chunk of land mass under the city as it drifted through space in the general direction of the Solar System. The land is converted into green kryptonite, which is covered with lead. However, the lead covering is destroyed in a meteor strike, forcing Kara to be sent to Earth.

It is later revealed that Zor-El and Alura survived by entering the Survival Zone, a parallel continuum akin to the Phantom Zone. They are rescued by Supergirl and move to the bottle city of Kandor. In the New Krypton storyline, the two are killed by Reactron.

On Earth, Kara acquires powers identical to Superman's and adopts the secret identity of Linda Lee, a resident of Midvale Orphanage. She conceals her blonde hair beneath a brunette wig and functions as Supergirl only in secret, at Superman's request, until she can gain, in his opinion, sufficient control of her powers — and the wisdom to properly use them. Her debut was delayed by her powers being stolen by a Kandorian villainess; during this period, she is adopted by Fred and Edna Danvers.

She attends Midvale High School as Linda Danvers. In later years, after graduating from Stanhope College, she changes careers several times, holding jobs in student counseling, news reporting, and acting in a TV soap opera, Secret Hearts (a play on the DC romance comic of the same name). She also attends college in Chicago. Kara has many boyfriends, including Richard (Dick) Malverne, Jerro the Merboy from Atlantis, and Brainiac 5, a member of the Legion of Super-Heroes. However, she has shunned serious commitments, placing her super-career first.

Supergirl's secret identity is a closely held secret known only to Superman, her foster parents, and the Legion of Super-Heroes, of which she is a member for a time. Like all Kryptonians, Supergirl is vulnerable to kryptonite. Streaky the Supercat, her orange cat, acquires temporary superpowers as a result of its exposure to "X-kryptonite," a form of kryptonite Supergirl accidentally created in an unsuccessful attempt to neutralize the effects of green kryptonite. Comet, a former centaur who was turned into a superpowered horse, is Supergirl's equine companion.

One way DC demonstrated the epic nature of its 12-issue limited series Crisis on Infinite Earths (April 1985 – March 1986) was through the deaths of important characters. In issue #7 (October 1985), Supergirl sacrifices herself to save her cousin and the multiverse. When the Superman continuity was rebooted after Crisis on Infinite Earths, DC editors felt that Superman should be the sole survivor of Krypton, resulting in Kara being removed. Unlike a number of other characters who are shown dying in the Crisis, no one remembers Kara dying or having existed.

After the events of Infinite Crisis, the sequel to Crisis on Infinite Earths, many historical events from the Multiverse are now being remembered. Donna Troy, after her rebirth and inheritance of the Harbinger's Orb, recalls the original Kara Zor-El and her sacrifice.

Supergirl, Art by Curt Swan.

A Post-Crisis Supergirl appears in Supergirl and the Legion of Super-Heroes, in which she is transported to the 31st century and, as a result of her disorientation, for a time believes she is dreaming her surroundings into existence until finally convinced otherwise. Although her memories of her time with the Legion are erased before she returns to the present, the mental blocks break down upon encountering the pre-Crisis versions of Karate Kid and Triplicate Girl.

Supergirl exhibits new powers, manifesting sunstone crystals from her body; so far, she only does so while under great stress (for example, when Cassandra Cain tries to kill her). Supergirl's father implants the crystals within his daughter's body to protect her from malevolent beings from the Phantom Zone. The Zone dwellers are released when Jor-El creates the Phantom Zone Projector and exploits the Zone as a prison. Kara's father, believing that Kal-El is a lure to the Zone denizens, instructs Kara to destroy him. More recent comics have cast this plotline as the result of kryptonite poisoning from the kryptonite asteroid in which she was trapped.

A recently completed storyline focused on her promise to a little boy that she would save him. She tries to make good on her promise, following different avenues searching for a cure for his cancer. After he dies, she tracks down a villain with the ability to jump through time, but decides not to use that solution, as she would just be doing the same thing as the villain. She accepts that sometimes she cannot save everyone.

As part of The New 52, Kara's origin was rebooted once again. An amnesiac Kara awakens after her lifepod crashes to Earth in the midst of a meteor shower. Upon emerging, she encounters humans and the extent of her powers for the first time. When encountered by Superman, she attacks him, believing him to be an impostor as her cousin was only a baby when she last saw him and she believed it to only have been a few days since then. After several battles with supervillains, including the Worldkillers, superweapons of Kryptonian design, she accepts Krypton's destruction, but continues to grapple with her grief. Her desire to restore Krypton results in her being manipulated into nearly destroying Earth by another Kryptonian whom she falls in love with. Upon realizing his manipulation, she kills him by driving kryptonite through his heart and succumbs to kryptonite poisoning.

Following her poisoning, Supergirl departs Earth to die alone. While adrift in interstellar space, she encounters a planet under attack by monsters and she intervenes to save them, unaware that the entire planet is a trap by Brainiac. She is captured and restrained by the Cyborg Superman, but after a struggle, she manages to escape. Returning to Earth, she is sent into the past by the Oracle alongside Superman and Superboy, where she ensures that a resurrected H'el cannot save Krypton. She sacrifices the planet and her family in order to save the universe.

Back on Earth, she is attacked by the assassin Lobo and, in the ensuing battle, kills him while unleashing her rage. A Red Lantern power ring finds her and attaches itself to her, transforming her into a Red Lantern. Driven insane by rage, Kara wanders through outer space, attacking everyone in her way, until captured by several Green Lanterns and brought to Hal Jordan. Immediately recognizing a Kryptonian and unable to remove the power ring without killing her, he brings her to Guy Gardner, the leader of one of the two Red Lantern factions, who manages to restore her sanity. After some time under Gardner's tutelage and protecting the galaxy as a Red Lantern, she is discharged from the Red Lantern Corps, as Guy did not want her to die needlessly fighting against Atrocitus' splinter group. On her way back to Earth, Kara encounters the leader of the Worldkillers, who are revealed to be parasitic suits of armor. He attempts to assimilate Kara as his host, but she voluntarily subjects herself to kryptonite poisoning in order to stop him and eventually flies into the Sun and removes her power ring, killing her and removing him from her body. However, Kara is revealed to be immortal while in the Sun's core and she is restored to life without the power ring or any kryptonite poisoning, immediately destroying the Worldkiller. She later helps Gardner against Atrocitus and his Red Lantern splinter group.

== Post-Crisis versions ==
DC Editorial wanted Superman to be the only surviving Kryptonian following DC's Post-Crisis reboot of the Superman continuity. As a result, when DC reintroduced Supergirl, she needed a non-Kryptonian origin. Afterward, DC Comics tried to revamp the Supergirl concept, introducing several more non-Kryptonian Supergirls. Eventually, the rule that Superman should be the only Kryptonian survivor was relaxed, allowing for a return of Kara Zor-El as his cousin.

=== Matrix ===
After the Post-Crisis reboot in the late 1980s, Supergirl's origin was completely rewritten and no longer was she Superman's cousin or even Kryptonian. In Superman (vol. 2) #16 (April 1988), a new Supergirl debuted as a man-made lifeform made of synthetic protoplasm created by a heroic Lex Luthor of a "pocket continuum". She wears a miniskirted version of Superman's costume, similar to the Pre-Crisis Supergirl costume, but does not have Superman's exact powers. While she can fly and possesses super-strength (like Superman), she also has psychokinesis, shapeshifting, and invisibility.

New to the main DC universe, Matrix begins living with the Kents in Smallville. They give her the name "Mae" and treat her like their own daughter. Later, she starts a romance with the DC Universe's Lex Luthor (known as Lex Luthor II at the time), until she realizes Luthor's villainous nature when she finds out he has been cloning her. She leaves him to find her own way in the world with the support of his ex-wife, Elizabeth Perske. Supergirl then began serving for a time as a member of the Teen Titans. During her time as Supergirl, Matrix participated in many major events, including Panic in the Sky, Death and Return of Superman, and Zero Hour: Crisis in Time!.

=== Matrix/Linda Danvers ===
Beginning in September 1996, DC published Supergirl (vol. 4) written by Peter David. The 1996 Supergirl comic book revamped the previous Matrix Supergirl by merging her with a human being, resulting in a new Supergirl. Many elements of the Pre-Crisis Supergirl were incorporated in new ways. The woman that the Matrix merges with has the same name as the Pre-Crisis Supergirl's secret identity, Linda Danvers. The series is set in the town of Leesburg, named after Danvers' pre-adoption surname. Linda's father is named Fred Danvers, the same as the Pre-Crisis Supergirl's adopted father. Furthermore, new versions of Dick Malverne and Comet appear as part of the supporting cast.

As the series begins, the Matrix sacrifices herself to save a dying Linda Danvers and their bodies, minds and souls merge to become an "Earth-Born Angel", a being created when one being selflessly sacrifices him or herself to save another who is beyond saving. As the angel, Supergirl loses some of her powers, but gains others, including fiery angel wings and a "shunt" ability that allows her to teleport to any place she has been before.

The angelic aspect of Supergirl eventually falls from grace, and Linda and the Matrix are separated into two beings. Linda retains some of Supergirl's super-strength and durability and, although she can no longer fly, she can leap one-eighth of a mile. Linda acts as Supergirl for a while, attempting to locate her angelic aspect. After she is found in the Garden of Eden and freed from the Demon Mother, the Matrix merges with a woman named Twilight and becomes the new Earth-Born Angel of Fire. Twilight uses her healing powers to increase Linda's strength to Supergirl's level and restores her powers of flight and telekinesis. In Supergirl (vol. 4) #75 (December 2002), detoured on her way to Earth, Kara Zor-El, the Pre-Crisis Supergirl, arrives in Post-Crisis Leesburg. After learning that Kara is destined to die, Linda travels to the Pre-Crisis universe in her place, where she marries Superman and gives birth to a daughter named Ariella. With the stipulation that her daughter be the exception in the eradication of her alternate "life", Linda ultimately allows history to unfold as it should have, with Kara assuming her rightful but tragic place in the timestream. However, finding no assurance that Ariella survived the restoration of Post-Crisis history, a dejected Linda relinquishes the role of Supergirl, sends a farewell note to Superman, and leaves for points unknown.

Peter David's creator-owned series Fallen Angel, published by DC Comics, is set in a fictional city named Bete Noire, and features a character, Lee, who is similar to Linda and explores the same themes as his Supergirl series. Prior to Fallen Angel moving to another company, Lee was written in a manner such that she could have been Linda, though David remained coy as to whether the two characters were one and the same during the DC run of the title. After it moved to IDW, David revealed Lee's origin, which clearly showed that Lee was not Danvers. However, Fallen Angel #14 introduced "Lin", who was said to be Lee's "predecessor" as the guardian of Bete Noire. Lin had recently escaped Limbo, an apparent metaphor for what happened to Danvers after the cancellation of Supergirl. David wrote in his December 13, 2006, blog entry, "Any fans of my run on Supergirl—particularly those who are torqued because Linda Danvers was consigned to oblivion in the DCU--must, must, MUST pick up "Fallen Angel" #14 and #15 when they come out next year." However, since David could not explicitly claim that a character owned by DC was the same as the character he owned, he stated, "Can I say this is Linda Danvers? Of course I can't. However, it's pretty freaking obvious that it is."

According to an interview with Newsarama, the Matrix Supergirl is wiped from existence by the events depicted in the 2005 limited series Infinite Crisis, although Infinite Crisis writer Geoff Johns later stated that Danvers is not. The debate was finally settled in the 2008 miniseries Reign in Hell, where the Shadowpact is shown trying to apprehend Linda Danvers before Linda is "recalled" to Hell.

=== Cir-El ===
A Supergirl named Cir-El appeared in 2003's Superman: The 10 Cent Adventure #1, claiming to be the future daughter of Superman and Lois Lane. Although she has super-strength, speed and hearing like Superman, she can only leap great distances. She also possesses the ability to fire blasts of red solar energy. Her alter ego is a street person named Mia. She is later found to be a human girl who was altered by Brainiac on a genetic level to appear Kryptonian; she dies thwarting a plot involving Brainiac 13. Superman (vol. 2) #200 implies that when the timeline realigned itself, Cir-El was erased from existence.

== Supporting characters ==
Even though Supergirl is a Superman supporting character, she is also a Superman Family member, with her own set of supporting characters.

- Zor-El and Alura – Kara Zor-El's biological parents. Zor-El, the younger brother of Jor-El, is a scientist who invents the dome over Argo City and oversees the placement of lead shielding over the ground of Argo, thus enabling the city's residents to survive the explosion of Krypton. The city drifts in space for about 15 years, the residents clinging to a precarious existence. During that time, the couple have a daughter, Kara, who grows to about the age of 10 or 12, when the city is put in peril when its lead shielding is punctured by meteors, releasing deadly Kryptonite radiation. At this point, Zor-El and Alura In-Ze place Kara in a rocket ship and send her to Earth, which Zor-El had observed using a powerful electronic telescope. Observing a super-powered man resembling his brother Jor-El, and wearing a uniform of Kryptonian styling, Zor-El and his wife conclude the man is probably their nephew, Kal-El, sent through space by Jor-El when Krypton exploded and now grown to adulthood. In later Silver Age accounts, Zor-El and Alura survive the death of Argo when, shortly before the radiation reached lethal levels, Zor-El projects them both into the Survival Zone, a separate dimension resembling the Phantom Zone; later they are released from the Zone and go to live in the bottle city of Kandor.
- Streaky – Supergirl's pet cat. In the pre-Crisis continuity, he is named after a jagged horizontal stripe of lighter fur on his side, and acquires super-powers after exposure to X-Kryptonite. In post-Crisis continuity, she is a normal housecat Supergirl takes in, whose name is taken from her inability to understand the concept of a litterbox.
- Comet – Pre-Crisis Supergirl's horse is a centaur accidentally cursed by Circe and transformed into a normal horse with superpowers. In post-Crisis continuity, Comet is a superhero who is a romantic interest of Linda Danvers.
- Fred and Edna Danvers – The foster parents of pre-Crisis Supergirl. Shortly after they adopt Linda Lee from the Midvale orphanage, Superman reveals his cousin's identity to them, so they are aware of her powers. Later, they also learn that Superman is secretly Clark Kent.
- Dick Malverne – An orphan at the Midvale Orphanage who is one of pre-Crisis Supergirl's romantic interests. While living at the orphanage as Linda Lee, Supergirl meets and befriends a fellow orphan, Dick Wilson. Dick suspects that Linda is secretly Supergirl and constantly tries to prove it. Later, Dick is adopted by a couple named Malverne, and changes his name to Dick Malverne. In the post-Crisis continuity, Dick Malverne is a newly arrived resident of Leesburg who befriends Linda Danvers.
- Jerro the Merboy – A merperson from Atlantis who is another of pre-Crisis Supergirl's romantic interests. Superman has a similar relationship with mermaid Lori Lemaris.
- Lena Thorul – Another orphan at the Midvale Orphanage who is one of Pre-Crisis Supergirl's/Linda Lee Danvers's best friends. Lena is unaware that she is the long lost younger sister of Lex Luthor. When Lena was still a small child and Lex was a teen, Lex turned evil after the laboratory accident he blamed on Superboy turned him bald. Lex's parents disowned him and told him to leave home. In order to prevent disgrace to Lena, they moved away from Smallville and told Lena that her brother had been killed in a mountain climbing accident. They changed their family name to Thorul, an anagram of Luthor. Eventually Lena's parents were killed in a car accident and Lena was sent to Midvale Orphanage. A childhood accident while playing in her brother Lex's laboratory empowered Lena with extrasensory perception.
- Siobhan Smythe - Kara's best friend who mistook her for an enemy. They both bonded and later battled Siobhan's father, the Black Banshee.

== Enemies ==
- Black Flame – A Kandorian who takes to a life of crime and fights Supergirl. Introduced in Action Comics #304 (September 1963).
- Blackstarr – Rachel Berkowitz discovers the secrets of the Unified Field Theory and employs it to manipulate reality as the leader of a group of neo-Nazis called the Party For Social Reform. Introduced in Supergirl vol. 2, #13 (November 1983).
- Blithe – Earth-born angel servant of Carnivore who merges with the evil form of Matrix. She later becomes an ally. Introduced in Supergirl (vol. 4) #36 (September 1999).
- Buzz – Gaius Marcus sells his soul to Baalzebub who goes on to become an agent for the Lords of Chaos. He would later become a shaky ally. Introduced in Supergirl (vol. 4) #1 (September 1996).
- Carnivore – The son of Lilith and Baalzebub, Carnivean is the first vampire to walk the Earth and usurp the rule of Heaven. He was introduced in Supergirl (vol. 4) #32 (May 1999).
- The Council – A clandestine criminal organization in Chicago that employs the Director, Matrix-Prime, and the Gang. Introduced in Daring New Adventures of Supergirl #3 (January 1983).
- Decay – Daniel Pendergast manipulates Psi into trying to destroy Chicago only to be turned into a monstrous slime creature. Introduced in Daring New Adventures of Supergirl #1 (November 1982).
- The Gang – A group of mercenaries whose members are Brains, Bulldozer, Ms. Mesmer, and Kong. Introduced in Daring New Adventures of Supergirl #4 (February 1983).
- Lesla-Lar – A Kandorian who tries to switch places with Supergirl on several occasions. Introduced in Action Comics #279 (August 1961).
- Lilith – The Mother of Demons, Lilith seeks revenge on Supergirl for destroying her son Carnivore. Introduced in Supergirl (vol. 4) #67 (April 2002).
- Matrix-Prime – A powerful robot built by the Council that acts as their agent, collecting funds and eliminating threats. Introduced in Daring New Adventures of Supergirl #6 (March 1983).
- Murmur – Demonic servant of Carnivore. Introduced in Supergirl (vol. 4) #33 (June 1999).
- Nasthalthia Luthor – Lex Luthor's niece and Supergirl's rival. Introduced in Adventure Comics #397 (September 1970).
- Princess Tlaca – An Aztec princess who seeks to triumph over Supergirl and restore the prestige of her civilization. Introduced in Superman Family #165 (June 1974).
- Psi – Gayle Marsh is a powerful psionic manipulated by Daniel Pendergast into trying to destroy Chicago. Introduced in Daring New Adventures of Supergirl #1 (November 1982).
- Reactron – A former army sergeant who can generate radioactive energy. Introduced in Daring New Adventures of Supergirl #8 (June 1983).
- Reign – A Worldkiller, a biological weapon created on Krypton that was soon outlawed by the Kryptonian Science Council. Introduced in Supergirl (vol. 6) #5 (March 2012)
- Silver Banshee – An enemy of Superman and the arch enemy of Supergirls Kara Zor-El and Linda Danvers.
- Superwoman – Lucy Lane becomes her father's agent against the residents of New Krypton, bringing her into conflict with Supergirl. Lucy appears as Superwoman for the first time in Supergirl (vol. 5) #35 (January 2009).
- Twilight – A New God who would curse the Presence and sees Supergirl as a means of exacting revenge. She merges with Matrix and becomes an ally. Introduced in Supergirl (vol. 4) #15 (November 1997).

== Other notable versions ==
"Supergirls", from Superman/Batman #24. Kara Zor-El, Linda Danvers, Cir-El, and Power Girl.

Several different versions of Supergirl have appeared in continuity.

- Power Girl (Kara Zor-L) – A version of Kara Zor-El from the parallel world Earth-Two, the cousin of Superman (Kal-L).
- Laurel Gand (Andromeda) – Laurel Gand was the post-Crisis/Glorithverse replacement for the pre-Crisis Supergirl in the Legion of Super-Heroes after the latter was removed from the continuity following The Man of Steel reboot of Superman. Originally, Laurel is simply known by her given name. A younger version of Laurel takes the superhero codename "Andromeda" shortly before the Zero Hour reboot of the Legion; post-reboot, Laurel remains Andromeda.
- Ariella Kent – Supergirl of the 853rd century, later revealed to be the daughter of post-Crisis Linda Danvers and Silver Age style Superman from the Many Happy Returns story arc.

=== Alternate universe versions ===
In the final issue of DC Comics' 2006-07 year-long weekly series, 52 #52, it was revealed that a Multiverse system of 52 parallel universes, with each Earth being a different take on established DC Comics characters as featured in the mainstream continuity (designated as "New Earth") had come into existence. The Multiverse acts as a storytelling device that allows writers to introduce alternative versions of fictional characters, hypothesize "what if?" scenarios, revisit popular Elseworlds stories and allow these characters to interact with the mainstream continuity.

- In 52 Week 52 (2007), the new Earth-2 is revealed and a newspaper headline declares that the Power Girl (and Superman) of this Earth are officially missing. On this world, Power Girl fights alongside Huntress (Helena Wayne), Obsidian, Robin, and others in the Justice Society Infinity. In Justice Society of America Annual #1, this world's native Power Girl re-emerges. In a subsequent reiteration of Earth-2 after the events of Flashpoint, Power Girl had a prior career on Earth-2 as that world's Supergirl before she and Earth-2's former Robin, Helena Wayne, were displaced onto Earth-0 after inadvertently entering a dimensional warp. They resided there for seven years until both returned.
- Following 52 (2007), on the evil parallel universe of Earth-3, a mirror of the Earth-2 Kara Zor-L exists in the form of Ultragirl, first introduced in Countdown to Final Crisis #16 (2007). Unlike Ultraman, the Superman counterpart of Earth-3, this version of Supergirl is in fact vulnerable to kryptonite and not powered by it, implying she may be of Kryptonian origin. Following Flashpoint (2011), Earth-3 is an evil world once again most closely mirroring Earth-0. Ultraman is once again a Kryptonian, but a new Ultragirl was not introduced in this iteration. In the most recent incarnation of this universe, a new Ultragirl is introduced. Much like the main universe version, she is Ultraman's cousin, though she is a hero while Ultraman is a villain.
- On Earth-10, Nazi Germany won World War II and that world's Superman, named Overman, is a part of the JL-Axis. That world's Supergirl was called Overgirl. She is first seen as a sketch made by exiled Monitor Nix Uotan in Final Crisis #2. She makes a full appearance in #3, where she crash lands in a burning heap on New Earth. There, she tells Renee Montoya, in German, that the sky is bleeding. She is not Overman's actual cousin, rather she is the only child who survived the horrible experiments the Nazis conducted when they tried to seed a human child with Overman's DNA. She has less than half of Overman's strength, speed, stamina and endurance, which is still considerable (however, this is subsequently modified after the events of Flashpoint impact the Multiverse-she is now a female clone of Overman, produced from his stem cells). She died in Final Crisis #7. In The Multiversity - Mastermen #1 (February 2015), Overman is still mourning her loss, six years after her death, as he opens a memorial to his fallen cousin in Metropolis. His lover Lena (Earth-10's Lana Lang) criticizes his prolonged mourning, as does the Valkyrie Brunnhilde (Earth-10's Wonder Woman).
- Earth-11 is first featured in The Search for Ray Palmer - Superwoman/Batwoman (2007), and is a gender-reversed mirror of New Earth. While not featured in the pages of the comic itself, male Supergirl, or Power Girl counterparts may inhabit this Earth. The previous gender-reversed world featured in Superman/Batman #24 (2006) featured a male Kara Zor-El counterpart known as Superlad In the subsequent and current Multiversity Guidebook (January 2015), Power Man is described as existing on this Earth, although not depicted.
- In Mark Waid and Alex Ross' Kingdom Come miniseries, Power Woman is Superman's cousin and a member of Superman's Justice League. This world is currently assigned the designation of Earth-22. However, a Supergirl appears with the Legion of Super-Heroes alongside Superboy in one panel, with dialogue implying they settled in the future permanently as the 21st-Century became difficult to live in. A brief line of dialogue from Superman implies that Argo City was never destroyed in this continuity, as he left some of the defeated Brainac's circuitry there. According to Ross, a minor character in the story is the time-traveling daughter of Supergirl and Brainiac 5.
- In the Tangent Comics imprint (established as Earth-97 prior to Infinite Crisis, now known as Earth-9 post-52), Powergirl is a genetically engineered superheroine created by the Chinese government. Supergirl was an unsuccessful prototype.
- On The New 52 DC Multiverse Earth-29, a Bizarro-Supergirl imperfect abiotic alternate version of the Kryptonian original exists. As with that world's Bizarro-Superman, it is uncertain whether they are native to Earth-29/Htrae, or arrived there from Krypton-29/Notpyrk.
- On The New 52 DC Multiverse Earth-38, the setting of Superman & Batman: Generations, Supergirl is Kara Kent, the daughter of Superman and Lois Lane on an alternate Earth where Superman and Batman began their careers in the 1930s, married in the 1940s and had children in the 1950s. Unlike other iterations, she masks her actual identity by wearing a black wig as Supergirl, with her normal blonde hair as Kara. Unlike other iterations too, she is not a refugee evacuated from Krypton or Argo City. Given prenatal exposure to gold kryptonite in utero, her brother Joel Kent lacks powers and is jealous of his sister, leading him to eventually murder his mother Lois Lane and Kara/Supergirl during her wedding to Bruce Wayne Junior/Batman.
- In Supergirl vol. 5 #32, Supergirl is shown 50 years in the future. She has a modified costume that is similar to her Pre-Crisis, original uniform. Here, she is seen fighting Dorlok, a man with a device that allows him to jump through time. In the end Supergirl, after contemplating using the device, destroys it and moves on.
- In the Trinity series, reality is rewritten and Superman is removed from existence. In this alternative timeline, Kara Zor-El is known as "Interceptor" and has no knowledge of her Kryptonian heritage. Her ship was found by the Navy, but apparently no investigation took place.
- In Legends of the DC Universe: Crisis on Infinite Earths, Earth D is introduced as a previously unknown Pre-Crisis alternate Earth. In this reality, the heroes of the DC Universe are more ethnically diverse. Supergirl of Earth D is still named Kara, but she is married to Earth D's Superman. From Krypton's Vathlo Island, she and her husband resemble Black humans. Along with her husband and the other members of Earth D's Justice Alliance of America, she was killed during the Crisis as antimatter consumed their Earth.
- In the Ame-Comi imprint, both a Supergirl and a Power Girl exist together. In this universe, Supergirl is still Kara Zor-El, while Power Girl is actually the equivalent of Superman — her name is Kara Jor-El, and she is the daughter of Jor-El and cousin of Kara Zor-El. According to Supergirl, Jor-El and Zor-El destroyed Krypton intentionally as part of a failed attempt to destroy Brainiac, after sending both their Karas to Earth. Brainiac later reaches Earth and uses black kryptonite to turn Supergirl evil. Unusually for most depictions of Kryptonians, this Power Girl claims her powers do not come from the Sun.
- In the 2015 DC Bombshells iteration, Supergirl, Wonder Woman and Batwoman all exist in an alternate history version of World War II, independently of their male counterparts in the case of Batwoman and Supergirl. In this continuity, Kara Zor-El was born to Lara Lor-Van and Alura In-Ze was found in her spaceship by Russian farmers Varvara Dugina and Ipati Dugan, who raised her with their daughter, Kortni Dugiovna. The two sisters became best of friends and in their teens traveled to Moscow to join the legendary Night Witches, an all-female fighter squadron, but became Russian mascots after their powers were discovered. They abandon Russia when they find out the general intended to use them for his own destructive means and join the Bombshells team to aid in defeating the Nazis. When Brother Night turns into the Titan, Supergirl volunteers to sacrifice herself to defeat the monster, but Stargirl knocks her out and does it instead, saving Britain and devastating Supergirl in the process. Kara becomes romantically involved with Lois Lane in this universe.
- The 2016 miniseries Supergirl: Being Super written by Mariko Tamaki and penciled by Joëlle Jones is a coming-of-age take on Supergirl's origins, depicting Kara as a seemingly ordinary teenager living in the rural Midvale with the Danvers, since the couple found her inside a pod in the middle of a field. Kara grows up aware of the pod and her unknown origins (which are glimpsed in dreams) and struggles to live a normal life as she discovers her astonishing super-human abilities, which she keeps a secret even from her closest friends.
- In the world of Gotham City Garage, Kara Zor-El was adopted by James Gordon and becomes Kara Gordon, Barbara's adoptive sister and a ridealong technician.
- In Frank Miller's Batman: The Dark Knight Strikes Again, Superman and Wonder Woman hide their daughter Lara from the world her entire life, but she later becomes important to the defeat of Lex Luthor and Brainiac, the story's antagonists. Lara possesses some of Wonder Woman's powers, benefiting from both a Kryptonian and an Amazonian heritage as that universe's Supergirl.
- In Kurt Busiek's Superman: Secret Identity miniseries, which depicts a Clark Kent who lives in the real world, Lois gives birth to two girls who grow up to manifest their father's powers and adopt variations on his costume.
- Elseworld's Finest: Supergirl & Batgirl depicts a Barbara Gordon/Kara Zor-El team in a world without their male counterparts. In another story that took place in this reality as seen in Superboy (vol. 3) #61, there is a female equivalent to the Conner Kent Superboy named Supergrrl. This Supergrrl is a clone of Supergirl, only aged at sixteen or so, who was created by that world's Lex Luthor.
- Supergirl: Wings reworks the Earth-born angel storyline with Zauriel as her companion; in it, Linda's guardian angel is Matrix, whose cynical view of her charge may lead to her fall.
- In the Superman/Aliens crossover limited series, published in 1995 by DC Comics and Dark Horse Comics, Superman discovers a domed city on an asteroid, not unlike the Argo City of the pre-Crisis Supergirl's origins, that is infested with Xenomorphs. Superman befriends the sole survivor, a plucky, blonde 16-year-old girl named Kara. The story reveals that Kara is not Superman's cousin, and that the colony is not Kryptonian, but is instead part of a world whose culture and religion were influenced by Krypton.

In Superman & Batman: Generations 3, Knightwing (Joel's son Clark, whose Kryptonian genes were activated by a perfected version of Luthor's serum) and his wife have twin daughters, Lois and Lara, who take the heroic identities of Supergirl Red / Supergirl Blue. Supergirl Blue gives up her powers in the 25th century so she can age normally, but uses Luthor's serum in the 26th century to restore them. Supergirl Red is killed the same century, leaving her sister as the last Supergirl. Supergirl Blue dies in the 30th century. When Darkseid is destroyed, she is erased from the timeline.

- In JLA: Created Equal, Linda Danvers, fifteen years after the Fall (a population destroying plague that killed all males), changes her name to Superwoman.
- In JLA: Act of God, Linda Danvers is one of many metahumans who loses her powers due to the Black Light event that strips the entire metahuman community powerless. However, she, along with Martian Manhunter, Aquaman and the Flash, trains with Batman and his associates so they may still be heroes. Changing her name to Justice, Linda and the others form the "Phoenix Group".
- In Superman/Gen^{13}, Caitlin Fairchild of Gen^{13} had received a bump on the head and suffered amnesia. When she awoke, she found Superman's cape draped over her and assumed that, with her super powers, she was Supergirl. She believed that she could not fly due to exposure to red kryptonite which, at the time, was only considered an urban legend. After going through multiple Supergirl outfits and generally causing more havoc than good, she was found by the other Gen^{13}s and Superman when the real Supergirl knocked her out. When Caitlin awoke, she regained her memory.
- An unidentified Supergirl, resembling Kara Zor-El, appears in Justice.
- An unidentified Supergirl appears in JLA: Another Nail.
- Kara Zor-El appears in the six-issue mini series Supergirl: Cosmic Adventures in the 8th Grade. The series features elements from all aspects of Supergirl continuity, but is written with a more tongue-in-cheek tone for young readers. In this series, Kara is designed as a typical teenager from Krypton's moon, Argo, who unintentionally ends up on Earth and meets up with her cousin, Superman. With his help, Kara is given a cover identity as Linda Lee and is enrolled in school. Over the course of the series, Kara befriends a local student named Lena Thorul (Lex Luthor's sister), deals with her own "Bizarro" self, Belinda Zee and ultimately gets drawn into the reality-conquering schemes of Mr. Mxyzptlk.
  - An alternative version of Kara is accidentally created when she gains time travel powers to prevent a meteor from hitting the school. This version of Kara is called Supragirl (after wanting to be called "Andromeda").
- Supergirl appears in the Tiny Titans comic book. Due to her pets Krypto, Streaky, Comet and Beppo appearing, this Supergirl is probably Kara Zor-El. She is portrayed as giggly and kind. She is shown to fly everywhere giving her character a sense of innocence. She is very smart, gaining A's and 'super' comments from her supervillain teachers. Batgirl and Robin are shown as two of her closest friends in the book; they all attend pet club together. Batgirl and Supergirl spend time together without the other Titans by having picnics.
- Supergirl appears in the comic crossover Justice League vs. Godzilla vs. Kong in which and the Justice League deals with Godzilla, King Kong and other monsters from the Monsterverse unleashed into the DC Universe. Supergirl is brainwashed by Grodd but later breaks free and helps defeat an rebuilt Mechagodzilla.
- Supergirl appears in the comic crossover DC x Sonic the Hedgehog. She makes a small appearance in the first miniseries Chaos Crisis, where she and Hawkgirl are aided by a Wonder Woman-suited Amy Rose in defeating Gorilla Grodd's gorilla army in Washington DC. Supergirl later returns for a larger role in Metal Legion, where she bonds with her partner Cream the Rabbit, who also wears her own Supergirl outfit.

== In other media ==
=== Film ===
- Producer Ilya Salkind originally wrote a treatment for the third installment from the Superman film series starring Christopher Reeve that expanded the film's scope to a cosmic scale, introducing the villains Brainiac and Mister Mxyzptlk, as well as Supergirl. The original outline featured a father–daughter relationship between Brainiac and Supergirl and a romance between Superman and Supergirl, even though the two are cousins in the comics. Warner Bros. rejected the outline.
- The first live-action depiction of Supergirl was in the eponymous 1984 film, starring Helen Slater as Kara Zor-El / Linda Lee / Supergirl. The film is a spinoff from the Salkind Superman film series, to which it is connected by Marc McClure's character, Jimmy Olsen. Its plot, which connects more traditionally to the comics than Salkind's outline, concerns Supergirl, Superman's cousin, leaving her isolated Kryptonian community of Argo City for Earth in an effort to retrieve the unique "Omegahedron", which has fallen into the hands of the evil witch Selena (Faye Dunaway). The film was poorly received and did poorly at the box office and no reference to the character was made in the subsequent Superman IV: The Quest for Peace.
- In August 2018, a film centered around Kara Zor-El / Supergirl, was announced to be in development with Oren Uziel penning the script. The studio intends to hire a female director, with Reed Morano—who has expressed interest in the project—being its top choice. Filming was expected to start production in early 2020.
- In February 2021, Sasha Calle was cast as Supergirl in The Flash (2023), directed by Andy Muschietti. In February 2023, it was confirmed that Calle would be portraying the Kara Zor-El version of the character.
- In January 2024, Milly Alcock was cast in the role of Kara Zor-El / Supergirl, who debuted in Superman (2025) before her solo standalone 2026 film set in the DC Universe, which was loosely based on the Supergirl: Woman of Tomorrow (2021–22) miniseries by writer Tom King and artist Bilquis Evely.
- Supergirl appears in media set in the Tomorrowverse, voiced by Meg Donnelly.

=== Television ===
==== Live-action ====
- In the seventh season (2007–2008) of the CW series Smallville, Kara is introduced into the cast and was portrayed by Laura Vandervoort. Smallville depicts her as Clark's (Tom Welling) cousin, whose spacecraft became trapped in stasis until the events of the sixth season finale, when the destruction of the dam the ship had landed near disrupted the stasis systems and allowed Kara to wake up. Much of season seven is concerned with Kara's attempts to adjust to life on Earth, especially after learning of Krypton's destruction and the fact that her "younger" cousin is now at least the same age as she. She makes guest appearances in season eight and in the show's tenth and final season, in which she becomes a Justice League member. In the season finale, she is sent into the future by the artificial intelligence of the Fortress of Solitude so that Clark can realize destiny and defeat Darkseid alone.
- A television series centered around the Kara Zor-El version of Supergirl, set in the shared universe Arrowverse, titled Supergirl starring Melissa Benoist as Kara Danvers, premiered on CBS on October 26, 2015, before later moving onto The CW on May 12, 2016. In the series, Kara was sent to Earth-38 to protect her cousin Kal-El although her pod got knocked off course and became stranded in the Phantom Zone for 24 years. Eventually, Kara crashes on Earth-38 where she is rescued by an adult Kal, who is now the iconic superhero "Superman". Superman leaves Kara in the care of the Danvers family who decides it best to hide her abilities from the world. Twelve years later, Kara is a reporter for Cat Co Worldwide Media. She eventually decides to reveal her powers to the world by saving her adoptive sister Alex Danvers from a near plane crash and is dubbed "Supergirl" by Cat Grant. With the help of Department of Extra-Normal Operations (D.E.O.) director Hank Henshaw who was later revealed as J'onn J'onzz / Martian Manhunter, her best friends Winn Schott and James Olsen / Guardian and her adopted sister Alex Danvers, Kara fights aliens and prisoners of fort rozz, led by her evil aunt Astra, and her husband non, who attempted to invade Earth. She is later joined by Lex Luthor's sister Lena, the Daxamite Mon-El, Querl Dox,(Brainiac-5) and Nia Nal / Dreamer in fighting enemies such as Mon-El's parents, the World Killers Reign, Red Daughter, alien activist Ben Lockwood / Agent Liberty the evil secret organisation Leviathan, and Nyxly in collaboration with Lex Luthor.
- The DC Universe version of Supergirl makes a cameo appearance in the Season One recap at the beginning of the Peacemaker second season premiere "The Ties That Grind", which retroactively establishes her as being present in the ending of the first season finale "It's Cow or Never", arriving with the Justice Gang too-late to assist Peacemaker in fighting the Butterflies.

==== Animation ====
- Supergirl was voiced by Nicholle Tom in Superman: The Animated Series. She is depicted as Kara In-Ze, not Superman's cousin as in the comic book, but rather a near-Kryptonian from Krypton's sister planet Argos. Argos was jolted from its orbit by Krypton's explosion into a much further orbit and only Kara survived freezing to death. When Superman finds her, he brings her back to Earth and treats her as a cousin. As continued in Justice League Unlimited, she and Superman grow very close, almost like siblings, but she departs when she falls in love with Brainiac 5 of the Legion of Super-Heroes in the distant future, feeling that she had not fit in on Earth in the present.
- DC Super Hero Girls or DC Superhero Girls (in various countries) is an American super hero action figure franchise created by DC Comics (a subsidiary of Time Warner) and Mattel that launched in the third quarter of 2015. The franchise was announced in April 2015. The range is to include books from Random House, Lego tie-ins and action figures from Mattel. The website was launched in early July 2015. Characters featured at launch were Wonder Woman, Batgirl, Supergirl, Harley Quinn, Poison Ivy, Katana and Bumblebee. Other characters including Hal Jordan, Barry Allen, Star Sapphire, Beast Boy, Cheetah, Hawkgirl and Catwoman also appear. Amanda Waller is featured as the principal of the series' setting Super Hero High. Many other DC Comics Heroes and Villains appear in the background as cameos. The story is about at Super Hero High School, well-known DC heroes attend classes and deal with all the awkwardness of growing up (with the added stress of having superpowers). Supergirl was voiced by Anais Fairweather. A movie DC Super Hero Girls: Hero of the Year based on the series, was released in 2016. She also appeared in the 2019 TV series of the same name, voiced by Nicole Sullivan.
- Melissa Benoist reprises her role of Overgirl in the animated web series Freedom Fighters: The Ray, set in the same continuity as the CW's Supergirl.
- Supergirl appears in the Harley Quinn episode "Getting Ice Dick, Don't Wait Up", voiced by Lacey Chabert.
- Supergirl / Kara Zor-El appears in My Adventures with Superman, voiced by Kiana Madeira. This version is initially a conqueror for the Kryptonian Empire, having been captured by Brainiac as an infant. However she is later revealed to have been brainwashed and conditioned by Braniac into believing she was helping the galaxy by bringing many worlds into the fold of the utopian Kryptonian Empire, when in actuality Brainiac was setting her loose to destroy every world they visited and wiping her memories of the events. It is with this heavy dose of reality, combined with resurfaced memories from her subconscious, that she breaks free from Braniac's control, sees the error of her ways, and paves the path for her redemption.
  - A potential future version of Supergirl named Lara Lane appears in the third season, voiced by Jolie Hoang-Rappaport, so-named in reference to 'Lara, Daughter of Superman' from The Dark Knight Strikes Again and The Dark Knight III: The Master Race, though unlike in the Dark Knight series, this version is the daughter of Clark Kent/Superman and Lois Lane instead of Superman and Wonder Woman. In the series, Lara comes from a dystopian future ruled by "Lex Luthor" (actually the Eradicator possessing his corpse) and his army of Eradicators. Lara is sent back in time with her brother Jonathan Lane to eliminate the past Luthor and end his tyranny. They join forces with Kara and Amanda Waller to confront Luthor's uncontrolled biological weapon, the Eradicator. After defeating the Eradicator, Lara and Jonathan say goodbye to their parents and return to the future.

=== Video games ===
- Supergirl appears as a playable character in Justice League Heroes exclusive for PlayStation Portable.
- A Lego minifigure version of Supergirl appears as a playable character in Lego Batman 2: DC Super Heroes, Lego Batman 3: Beyond Gotham, and in the DC TV Super-Heroes DLC pack in Lego DC Super-Villains.
- Supergirl makes a cameo appearance in the IOS version of Injustice: Gods Among Us as a support card.
- Supergirl appears as a playable character in Injustice 2, voiced by Laura Bailey. In the story, her escape pod is retrieved by Black Adam after the events of the first game. She is trained by Adam and Wonder Woman into perfecting her powers as they tell her stories of her cousin, inspiring her to become Supergirl. After the Regime and Insurgency ally with each other to take out Brainiac (who was responsible for Krypton's destruction), Kara discovers what the Regime has truly done on the planet and is appalled by her cousin's actions. She and Batman infiltrate Brainiac's ship to stop the tyrant, and when Batman and Superman argue with each other over Brainiac's fate, Supergirl allies with Batman. She appears in both of the game's endings, where she will either become a part of Batman's Justice League to recapture what her cousin stood for before Lois' death, or will be imprisoned by Superman until she becomes a part of his Regime. In her single player ending, she works with the Justice League to revive the Kryptonian civilizations of Argo City and Kandor.
- Supergirl appeared in Lego Dimensions as a playable character, voiced by Kari Wahlgren.

== Homages and pastiches ==
- Suprema is Alan Moore's Supreme's sister with identical powers to him.
- Ultragirl is a Big Bang Comics daughter of the Earth-A Ultiman.
- Eiko (or A-ko) from Project A-ko is shown as Superman's daughter in one scene.

== See also ==
- Miss Martian, created as a stand-in for Supergirl in Teen Titans
- Women warriors in literature and culture
