= Scorn (DC Comics) =

- Scorn, as seen in the cover of The Adventures of Superman #553 (December 1997).

Publication information
- Publisher: DC Comics
- First appearance: Superman (vol. 2) #122 (April 1997)
- Created by: Dan Jurgens

In-story information
- Alter ego: Ceritak
- Place of origin: Bottled City of Kandor
- Team affiliations: Superman Family
- Supporting character of: Superman, Jimmy Olsen
- Abilities: Superhuman strength; Flight; Tracking

Scorn (Ceritak) is a fictional character in the DC Comics universe. He first appeared in Superman (vol. 2) #122 (April 1997), and for a time was a regular supporting character in the Superman line of comics.

== Fictional biography ==
Ceritak was born in Kandor, an extradimensional place populated by a variety of creatures from all over the universe. Most of the inhabitants descended from beings imprisoned in Kandor at some time either by the living computer Brainiac or the magician Tolos, who stole the city from Brainiac. Obsessed with escaping from the imprisonment in Kandor, Ceritak escapes via a disruption in the energy wall surrounding it.

Stranded on Earth, Ceritak, is regarded as a threat and dubbed "Scorn" by the media. After a run-in with Superman, he manages to prove his good nature and benevolent intentions. Scorn is later captured by a group of mercenaries working on behalf of Lex Luthor, who intend to learn the whereabouts of Kandor. Jimmy Olsen and his girlfriend Misa, aided by a small blue creature (later identified as a 'Fuzzlet', a creation of Project Cadmus), rescue Scorn just before Luthor blows up the barn where he had been held.

Shortly after returning to Metropolis, Ceritak vanishes, only leaving a note in his undecipherable alien language. He has not appeared since.

== Powers and abilities ==
Scorn is an alien who possesses superhuman strength, flight, and tracking abilities.

== In other media ==
Scorn appears as a character summon in Scribblenauts Unmasked: A DC Comics Adventure.
