= Supergirl (Cir-El) =

- Cir-El as appeared as the character's debut in Superman: The 10¢ Adventure #1 (2003); Art by Scott McDaniel

Publication information
- Publisher: DC Comics
- First appearance: Superman: The 10¢ Adventure #1 (2003)
- Created by: Steven Seagle; Scott McDaniel (based upon the Kara Zor-El created by Otto Binder and Al Plastino)

In-story information
- Alter ego: Mia (Human persona); Cir-El (Kryptonian persona)
- Species: Human/Kryptonian hybrid
- Notable aliases: Supergirl
- Abilities: Superhuman strength, durability, speed, and hearing; Flight; Solar manipulation

Supergirl (also known as Cir-El or Mia) is a superheroine appearing in American comic books published by DC Comics. Created by writer Steven Seagle and artist Scott McDaniel, she first appeared in Superman: The 10¢ Adventure #1 (2003) as the alleged daughter of Superman. She is later found to be a human girl who was genetically altered by the villain Brainiac to appear Kryptonian.

The character apparently disappears from the present when she enters a time stream, traveling to another timeline, to thwart a plot involving Brainiac 13. Although after her disappearance Cir-El has subsequently appeared in other stories set in the main timeline, even meeting the other Supergirls in Superman/Batman (vol. 1) #24, proving that she is still alive. Later DC events that restore the concept of an infinite multiverse and different universes and timelines coexisting at the same time, such as "Dark Nights: Death Metal" and "Dark Crisis", seemingly prove this.

Natasha Irons, Girl 13, and Cir-El form "The Supergirls". Art by Mike Deodato.

== Fictional character biography ==
=== Superman: The 10¢ Adventure ===
When a crazed villain named Radion attacks Metropolis, a young girl in a costume leaps into battle and throws the villain into a nuclear reactor. The girl identifies herself as Supergirl, Superman's daughter. When Superman confronts the girl, she claims to be Cir-El, the daughter of Superman and Lois Lane, who originates from the future and was brought to the past by the Futuresmiths. When Superman encounters the Futuresmiths, they show him a future dominated by robotic monsters and a cybernetic version of Superman, which they claim will only be prevented by Cir-El's death. As the Futuresmiths turn to attack Cir-El, Superman flies her to safety.

When Superman and Batman are said to be "captured" by President Lex Luthor in the Superman/Batman arc "Public Enemies", Cir-El teams up with Superboy, Krypto, and Natasha Irons to rescue them. Batman, not actually having been captured, saves Cir-El and Superboy from a White House death trap.

Superman has a shock when, while talking to Cir-El, she changes into an angry young woman named Mia, who hates her Cir-El persona. Kelex subsequently confirms that Cir-El is not related to Superman. While Mia has some Kryptonian attributes, she is primarily human.

=== Rewritten history ===
Disaster strikes when a future Superman appears and shows Superman a future where Lois Lane is killed, Wonder Woman and Batman are turned into cyborgs by a nano-tech virus, and Cir-El is trapped in a Brainiac robot. Brainiac reveals that he created Cir-El by grafting Kryptonian DNA onto a human body, gave her false memories, and made her a carrier of the nano-virus. Horrified, Cir-El throws herself into a time portal to prevent herself from being born and alter the future.

=== The return of Cir-El ===
Thanks to the time-traveling efforts of Bizarro in Superman/Batman #24, Cir-El returns and joins Linda Danvers, Kara Zor-El, and Power Girl to rescue Superman from the Source. However, Superman does not recognize Cir-El due to her originating from an erased timeline.

Cir-El and the other Supergirls then assist Superman and Batman in a reality-altering fight against various menaces from many alternate dimensions. At the conclusion of the fight, Mister Mxyzptlk sends Cir-El and everyone else involved back to their appropriate locations.

== Powers and abilities ==
A hybrid of human/Kryptonian origin, Cir-El possesses the standard abilities of Kryptonians, including immense strength, durability, speed, hearing, and flight. She can release stored energy from her hands as blasts of red solar radiation that generate intense heat and force.
