= General Zod (1978 film series character) =

Antagonist of the film Superman II

- Superman character
- Terence Stamp as General Zod
- First appearance: Superman (1978)
- Last appearance: Superman II (1980) (canonical); Space Jam: A New Legacy (2021) (non-canonical)
- Based on: General Zod by: Robert Bernstein; George Papp
- Adapted by: Mario Puzo; David Newman; Leslie Newman
- Portrayed by: Terence Stamp

In-universe information
- Species: Kryptonian
- Abilities: Invulnerability, superhuman strength, speed, sight, and hearing, frost breath, heat vision, X-ray vision, flight, amnesia-inducing touch

General Zod is a fictional character in the Superman film series based on the DC Comics character of the same name. He is portrayed by Terence Stamp. Zod is notably the only other villain to appear in the film series originating from the comics besides Lex Luthor.

== Development and execution ==
Stamp portrayed the Kryptonian supervillain General Zod in Richard Donner's Superman (1978), in which he appeared in a scene with Marlon Brando. The film and its first sequel were originally conceived as one film, with Zod and his evil conspirators returning later in the film to challenge Superman, but the screenplay was so long that the producers elected to split it into two parts. Both parts began shooting simultaneously, but production on the sequel was halted partway through due to budget and time constraints. Stamp reappeared as General Zod in the second part, Superman II (1980), as the movie's primary villain. Donner was replaced as director on the sequel with Richard Lester, who completed the film using portions of Donner's original footage combined with newly filmed scenes.

Originally depicted as bald and clean-shaven, Zod's look in popular culture was defined by the character's depiction by Terence Stamp. Eventually, the character was reintroduced to the DC Multiverse with black hair and a goatee beard.

During the early development of Superman Returns, film director Brett Ratner wanted Zod to appear. He wanted English actor Jude Law for the role, but Law turned down the role when Bryan Singer entered to direct the project after Ratner's departure to direct X-Men: The Last Stand. As a result, Zod was omitted from the final script.

== Portrayal and characteristics ==
Zod is the ruthless, arrogant and megalomaniacal leader of three Kryptonian criminals banished to the Phantom Zone and unwittingly set free by Superman (Christopher Reeve). Zod, upon landing on Earth and gaining the same superpowers as Superman, immediately views humans as a weak and insignificant sub-species and imposes his evil will for world dominance. New York magazine described the character as an "interplanetary snob and aesthete". However, his arrogance causes him to quickly become bored with his powers and he is almost disappointed at how little of a challenge humans are. His insatiable lust for power is replaced however by revenge when he learns that the son of Jor-El (Marlon Brando) stands in the way of his absolute rule of the planet.

== Film appearances ==
=== Superman ===
Zod first appears in the portion of the film set on Krypton where he, Ursa (Sarah Douglas) and Non (Jack O'Halloran) are sentenced by Jor-El of the Science Council to isolation in the Phantom Zone for an unspecified crime. They appear to be transferred into the two-dimensional space on the mirror's surface, which is then flung into deep space. The Phantom Zone is only referred to by name in the extended versions of Superman when it is mentioned by the Kryptonian First Elder. Superman's mother Lara refers to the Phantom Zone by name in Superman II when she first makes the revelation about the three villains contained inside it. In his DVD commentary, director Richard Donner refers to it as "the Zone of Silence".

Teenage Clark Kent discovers who he is in the Fortress of Solitude, where a hologram of Jor-El tells him, "You are the only survivor of the planet Krypton." This remark appears to prove untrue in Superman II, as prisoners of the Phantom Zone, such as Zod, also survive the destruction of Krypton. However, Zod and his lieutenants only survived because they were at that time incarcerated within the Phantom Zone and were not in fact on Krypton at the time of its destruction.

=== Superman II ===
As Superman saves the city of Paris from destruction by hurling a nuclear bomb into space; the resulting nuclear explosion inadvertently shatters the Phantom Zone and releases the three prisoners. Now free, General Zod and his cohorts travel to Earth, wreaking havoc with the superpowers granted to them by Earth's yellow sun. Along the way they meet a newly escaped Lex Luthor (Gene Hackman), who guides them to the Daily Planet.

=== Superman II: The Richard Donner Cut ===
The Phantom Zone appears in Richard Donner's cut of Superman II, released in November 2006. In this version (per the original shooting script prior to being altered by director Richard Lester for the theatrical version), the Phantom Zone is shattered by the rocket Superman threw into space in the first Superman film. The Zone is shown splitting into three separate shards, one containing each villain, before it finally shatters, freeing them. Jor-El presents a visual representation of the Phantom Zone and its occupants in a recorded message embedded in the education crystals housed at the Fortress of Solitude, unaware that he is actually talking to Lex Luthor and Eve Teschmacher. After defeating Zod and his followers, Superman uses a time-warp to keep the three criminals imprisoned in the Phantom Zone while undoing the damage they had done during their time on Earth.

== Role in the franchise ==
On the occasion of Superman's fiftieth anniversary in 1988, Stamp introduced the BBC Radio special Superman On Trial, which was produced by Dirk Maggs and starred Stuart Milligan as Superman. In 2003, Stamp returned to the Superman franchise in a new role, by portraying the voice of Clark Kent's biological father Jor-El in the WB/CW television series Smallville. He also provided the scream of Zod (being exorcised from the body of Lex Luthor) in the sixth-season premiere episode "Zod". In 2006, he appeared as Zod once again in Superman II: The Richard Donner Cut (a retooled version of the 1980 film which features footage shot by Donner, the film's original director).

In 2006, the Superman comics themselves adapted elements from the Superman movies, specifically the ice-like look of Krypton, and Jor-El banishing the criminals to the Phantom Zone. Ursa and Non made their first appearances in the comic book continuity. This was facilitated in the "Last Son" story arc, co-written by Richard Donner.

== In other media ==
- In 1981, Zi-Kree, a Kryptonian villain banished to the Phantom Zone, with an appearance based on General Zod's appearance in Superman: The Movie and Superman II, appeared on a sixth season episode of Super Friends titled "The Evil from Krypton".
- A LEGO version of Zod briefly appears in The Lego Batman Movie, being blasted into the Phantom Zone by Superman during a news report. His appearance is modeled on Terence Stamp's portrayal of Zod.
- General Zod appears in the DC Super Hero Girls two-part episode "#DCSuperHeroBoys", voiced by Liam O'Brien. This version is also based on Stamp's portrayal of Zod
- This version of General Zod made a background cameo in Space Jam: A New Legacy in the villain audience behind Al-G Rhythm and alongside his two henchmen Non and Ursa.

== Reception ==
It was Stamp who transformed Superman's arch nemesis into a sadistic supervillain. The terrifying demand: 'Kneel before Zod!' is remembered as one of the most iconic moments in comic book film history.

— Terence Stamp: five best moments – 1. Superman II. Article published in The Guardian, February 2013.

British cinema magazine Total Film named Terence Stamp's version of General Zod No. 32 on their 'Top 50 Greatest Villains of All Time' list (beating out the No. 38 place of Lex Luthor) in 2007. Pop culture website IGN placed General Zod at No. 30 on their list of the 'Top 50 Comic Book Villains' while commenting "Stamp is Zod" (emphasis in original). Meanwhile, this portrayal is rated #58 on Wizard magazine's "100 Greatest Villains of All Time" list.

== See also ==
- General Zod (DC Extended Universe)
