= Zod (DC Extended Universe) =

DC Extended Universe character

General Dru-Zod
- DC Extended Universe character
- Michael Shannon as General Zod in Man of Steel (2013)
- First appearance: Man of Steel (2013)
- Last appearance: The Flash (2023)
- Based on: General Zod by: Robert Bernstein; George Papp
- Adapted by: Christopher Nolan; David S. Goyer; Zack Snyder
- Portrayed by: Michael Shannon

In-universe information
- Full name: Dru-Zod
- Species: Kryptonian
- Title: General
- Occupation: Military commander
- Affiliation: Sword of Rao
- Nationality: Kandoran
- Abilities: Genius intellect, skilled martial artist and hand-to-hand combatant, invulnerability, superhuman strength, speed, sight, and hearing, frost breath, heat vision, X-ray vision, and flight

General Dru-Zod is a fictional character in the DC Extended Universe based on the DC Comics character of the same name. He is portrayed by Michael Shannon. Zod first appeared in the 2013 film Man of Steel, as a rogue general trying to lead a coup against the ruling elite of the planet Krypton, forcing the planet's chief scientist, Jor-El, to send his son Kal-El to Earth. Zod is punished for his war crimes, with him and his subordinates intended to be sent to the Phantom Zone, but following Krypton's destruction, he and his followers escape and follow Kal-El to Earth, forcing him to become Superman and protect the planet and its inhabitants. Shannon's portrayal of Zod has received positive reviews, and the character is considered one of the best villains in the DCEU. Shannon reprised his role in The Flash (2023).

== Character creation ==
=== First appearance and previous portrayal ===
General Zod appeared for the first time in Adventure Comics #263. Since then, Zod has been considered as one of Superman's greatest archenemies. Like Superman, he has the ability to fly, possesses superhuman strength, heat vision, frost breath and other powers. Zod made his live-action debut in the 1978 film adaptation, with Terence Stamp taking on the role of Zod and reprising it in the 1980 sequel with a more prominent arc.

=== Casting and behind the scenes ===
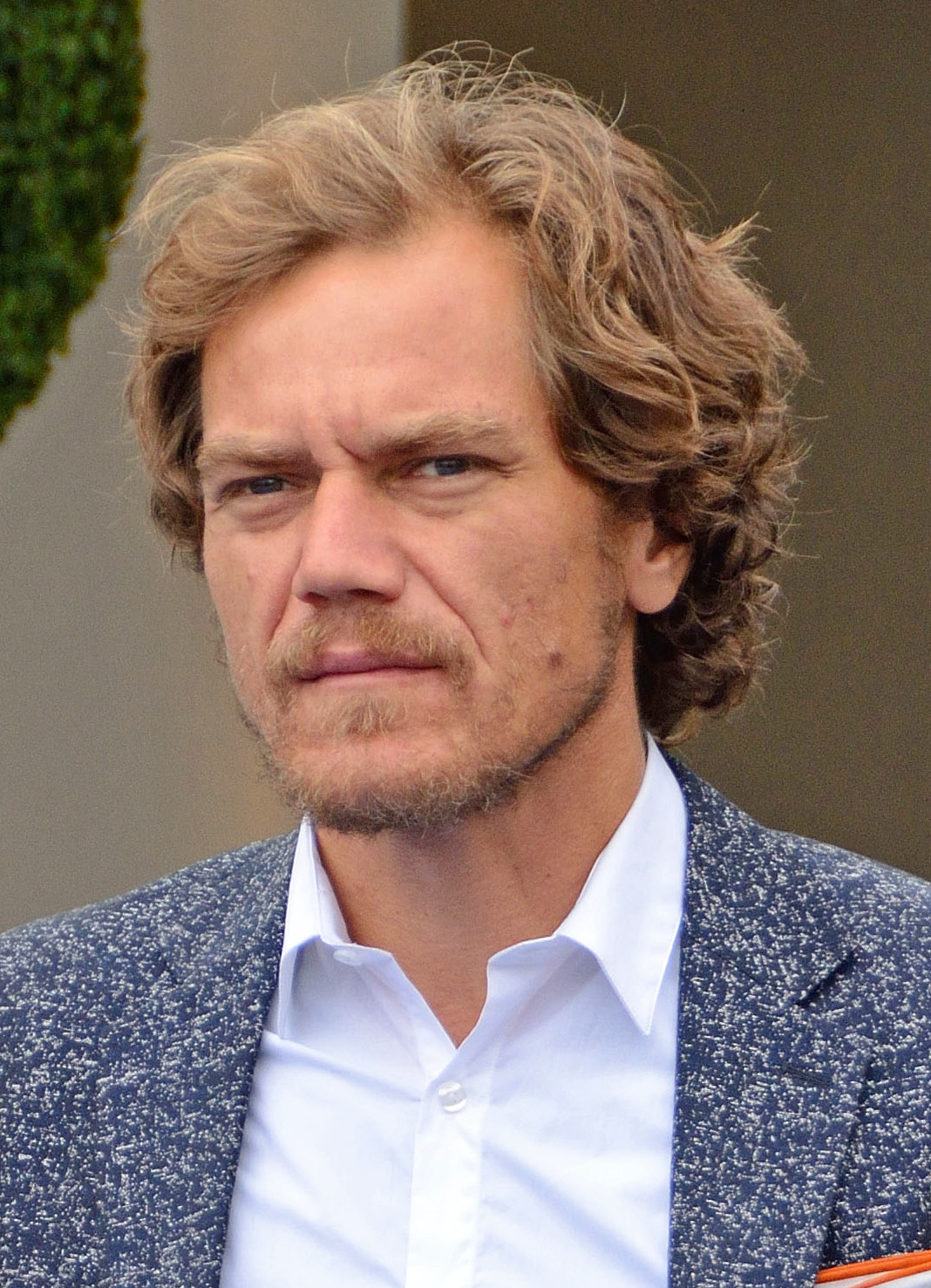
Michael Shannon in 2015

American actor Michael Shannon was cast as Zod for Man of Steel (2013), a reboot of the Superman film franchise that would eventually become the first entry into the DC Extended Universe (DCEU). Viggo Mortensen and Daniel Day-Lewis were also considered for the role. Director Zack Snyder stated, "Zod is not only one of Superman's most formidable enemies, but one of the most significant because he has insights into Superman that others don't. Michael is a powerful actor who can project both the intelligence and the malice of the character, making him perfect for the role". When screenwriter David S. Goyer was asked about why Zod was chosen as the villain, he stated, "The way [Christopher] Nolan and I have always approached movies as well is you never say, 'Hey, which villain would be cool for this movie?' You start with the story first. What kind of story? What kind of theme do you want to tell? So we worked that out. Then, usually the villain becomes obvious in terms of who's going to be the appropriate antagonist for that. When you guys see the movie, the only villain we could've used was Zod and the Kryptonians. I mean, when you see what the whole story is, nothing else would have even made sense".

Much like Superman actor Henry Cavill and Faora actress Antje Traue, Shannon trained extensively for his role, utilizing workouts that heavily featured goblet squats and barbell complexes under trainer Mark Twight. General Zod's bodysuit was designed by Michael Wilkinson with an alien chain mail motif and his family crest in the front, similar to Superman, Faora, Jor-El, and other Kryptonian characters in the film. The Kryptonian armor for Zod was constructed through CGI to allow Shannon "freedom of movement", due to the substantial weight that a practical suit of armor would yield.

The death of Zod at the end of Man of Steel proved to be heavily debated during the film's production. Originally, much like with Faora and his other henchmen in the finished film, Zod was going to be sucked into the Phantom Zone. As that ending for Zod dissatisfied the filmmakers, Goyer suggested to some DC Comics employees to have Superman kill Zod, even though Nolan had shown aversion at the idea and dissuaded Goyer from even trying to write such a scenario. Much of DC's staff, like Nolan, were opposed to the idea, but Goyer and Snyder ultimately convinced everyone involved by pointing out that Superman would only dispose of Zod because the former would give him no other options, forcing Superman to kill him quickly to save a cornered family from Zod's heat vision.

For Batman v Superman: Dawn of Justice (2016), the corpse of Zod appears in the film in a crucial role, being used by Jesse Eisenberg's Lex Luthor to create Doomsday; however, Michael Shannon did not film any scenes for the film and the corpse was created using the physique of fitness model Greg Plitt and a head-shot of Shannon.

Shannon was later approached by Andy Muschietti to reprise his role as Zod in The Flash (2023), the last installment in the DCEU before its soft-reboot in anticipation of the DC Universe (DCU) managed by James Gunn and Peter Safran. Initially surprised at the offer for his character's death in his first appearance, Shannon was informed about how the concept of the DC continuity's Multiverse would enable him to return, a phenomenon Shannon wasn't aware of due to not particularly being a "superhero genre consumer". Shannon felt that revising Zod was enjoyable and that the few weeks of shooting at England he had were a "nice way" to spend some of his summer. Working with Muschietti was something Shannon had been interested in doing due to how recommended Muschietti had been by some of Shannon's friends who had worked with him, praising Muschietti for being as creative as Snyder and a brilliant, visual artist who would often draw while Shannon and his co-stars rehearsed. Having so much fun filming The Flash, Shannon kept one of Muschietti's drawings at home with his permission and has expressed interest in working with him again if the opportunity arises. Before accepting to return, however, Shannon requested to first be given the blessing of Snyder, with whom Shannon had sided with over his tumultuous exit from Warner Bros., as Warner's mistreatment of Snyder was a factor for which Shannon was hesitant to reprise his role, and Snyder gave it.

=== Themes and characterization ===
Zod is portrayed in Man of Steel as a highly skilled, determined, and charismatic warrior, fiercely loyal to his race and its ideals and unafraid to act on instinct. Despite caring for other Kryptonians at times, he views those of other races, such as humans, to be inferior, disregarding their extinction when he attempts to xenoform Earth into Krypton-like conditions. He also does not grasp the concept of free will, and when his plans are thwarted, is driven mad by the loss of his people and failing at what he perceives to be his sole purpose in life, vowing to personally wipe out humanity in revenge until Superman is forced to kill him. Writing for The Huffington Post, Colin Liotta compared Zod in the film to Adolf Hitler, citing: "He feels his vision for a pure Krypton (i.e. a society like the one Hitler envisioned with his eugenics program) is the only answer for survival".

For his return in The Flash, Shannon stated prior to the film's release that his reprisal in the film was a "little different" than his Man of Steel one by virtue of Zod not counting with a long screentime than in his first appearance in order to not veer the attention away from Ezra Miller's Barry Allen / The Flash. Because of this, Zod's characterization isn't depicted as "deeper" like in his debut and the audience doesn't get to know what he's thinking. As he later elaborated, Zod's appearance in the film serves more like a plot device, or an obstacle like Shannon referred to, than a pivotal in-depth role.

== Appearances ==
=== Man of Steel (2013) ===
General Zod is introduced as a warrior loyal to Krypton, having been genetically engineered in a Genesis chamber and assigned his role in Kryptonian society like all other Kryptonians. Zod was raised in the Kryptonian Warrior Guild and rose to the rank of general. During his youth, he also befriends Krypton's leading scientist Jor-El, for having the same interest to keep Krypton safe and in order. When Krypton is near destruction due to excessive mining of the planetary core, Zod considers the council too weak to keep their race alive, so he forms the Sword of Rao, a rogue faction with the Kryptonian military, and recruits his followers to launch an uprising and purge the "degenerative bloodlines" ruling Krypton. Jor-El refuses to join and escapes an arrest attempt by Zod's followers. When Zod arrives at Jor-El's home, he realizes that the latter had stolen the genetic codex and is about to ship it off with his son, Kal-El, the first naturally born Kryptonian child in centuries. Lara Lor-Van, Jor-El's wife, launches Kal to Earth as the male Kryptonians scuffle, after which Zod kills Jor-El in cold blood. In the aftermath, Zod and his followers are arrested and sentenced to exile in the Phantom Zone after being convicted of treason. Zod vows to find Kal-El before he and his troops are cryogenically frozen and shipped off into the Phantom Zone.

After Krypton inevitably explodes, the Phantom Zone portal opens, freeing Zod and his followers, who mourn the destruction of their home world. With the portal's Phantom Drive, they repurpose their prison ship, the Black Zero, and travel across the galaxy to planets colonized by the Kryptonians. Despite failing to find survivors, they retrieve Kryptonian technology including a World Engine used to xenoform planets to the needs of Kryptonians. Around 2013, Zod's forces intercept a signal from Earth after an adult Kal-El, now known as Clark Kent, activates a Kryptonian scout ship found in the Arctic. Suspecting that Kal-El is on Earth, Zod broadcasts a global address that he surrender or risk war. Clark reluctantly agrees to his demands, with Daily Planet reporter Lois Lane joining him as a hostage. When Zod finally meets Clark, the latter collapses while adjusting to the Kryptonian atmospherics. In a dreamlike vision, Zod tells Clark about how they managed to escape the Phantom Zone and find him. Zod also tells him that he possess several xenoforming devices and his intentions to xenoform Earth in order to create a New Krypton but the human race would go extinct as a result. Clark refuses to join, and Zod reveals he killed Jor-El as he ties up Clark, who has his blood drawn by Zod's science officer Jax-Ur. He leaves the ship to recover the codex which he suspects that is hidden on Clark's pod, in the Kent's farm. He confronts Martha Kent but before he can harm her, Clark, having escaped, attacks him, breaking open his helmet and exposing him to Earth's atmospherics. As Zod experiences what Clark did as a child, he collapses and is rescued by his troops.

Back on the ship, Jax-Ur tells Zod that Jor-El infused the genetic codex to Clark's DNA after examining his blood, and also tells him that with the genetic information, Clark is not needed alive to create new Kryptonians. Zod deploys the World Engine from the ship and it lands in the Indian Ocean. When the ship enters Earth and arrives above Metropolis, it begins firing a beam through the planet towards the World Engine, beginning the xenoforming which severely damages the city. Zod heads to the Arctic to take the scout ship which contains a Genesis chamber. Jor-El's hologram speaks with Zod and attempts to convince him to abort the mission, but the latter refuses, deleting the AI and taking the ship to Metropolis. Zod attempts to destroy a U.S. Air Force aircraft aiming to attack the Black Zero, but Clark, now calling himself "Superman" and having destroyed the World Engine, infiltrates the scout ship and crashes it. This allows the American plane to crash into the Black Zero with the activated Phantom Drive of Clark's pod, which creates a singularity that sucks Zod's troops back to the Phantom Zone. With the ship destroyed and Krypton's only hope of revival gone, the now insane Zod vows to destroy the Earth and its inhabitants out of revenge, gaining the ability to fly after honing his senses. The two Kryptonians engage in a lengthy battle across Metropolis, causing more destruction, with Clark eventually gaining the upper hand, but when Zod attacks a cornered family in a train station with his heat vision and refuses to back down, Clark reluctantly kills Zod—the only other remaining Kryptonian—by snapping his neck.

=== Batman v Superman: Dawn of Justice (2016) ===
Eighteen months later, Metropolis has rebuilt itself after suffering catastrophic damage from the battle, with a park and monument built at the spot where the Black Zero landed. Zod's corpse is now in the hands of the United States government, having been studied by several scientists on the Kryptonian scout ship now located in Metropolis and surrounded by a government facility. Lex Luthor attempts to persuade Senator June Finch to allow him to import Kryptonite discovered after Zod's xenoforming attempt, so that it can be used as a deterrent against future Kryptonian and metahuman threats, but she declines, knowing it is a guise to assassinate Superman. However, Senator Barrows allows Lex to have access to study and analyze the body of Zod and the Kryptonian scout ship. Luthor eventually discovers that the exposure to kryptonite decays Kryptonian cells and significantly weakened Zod to mortal standards. Later, Luthor creates a Kryptonian deformity using the scout ship's Genesis chamber, Zod's corpse, and Luthor's blood as a "backup plan" to kill Superman, after failing to manipulate Batman into doing so. This formed an egg sack that the Kryptonian monster emerged from. Though the monster, which Luthor calls his "doomsday", is impervious to nuclear weapons and regenerates itself upon being harmed, Superman manages to kill it with a Kryptonite spear along with Batman and Wonder Woman's help, though it costs him his own life.

=== The Flash (2023) ===
An alternate timeline version of General Zod appears in the 2023 film The Flash, with Michael Shannon reprising his role. Zod travels with his crew to Earth, which they were never locked in the Phantom Zone. Arriving on the planet, they begin the attack and in an encounter with Kara Zor-El, who learns that Zod killed Kal-El when his pod strayed as a baby, and that the Growth Codex needed to convert the Earth on Krypton is inside her, after a confrontation, he kills her by taking her blood sample, before this timeline was restored by The Flash, erasing him from existence.

== Reception ==
Despite the polarized reception to Man of Steel overall, Michael Shannon's interpretation of General Zod in the film received critical acclaim. Mark Birrell from Screen Rant ranked Zod as the second greatest DCEU villain in 2019, second only to Amanda Waller in Suicide Squad. Describing Shannon's performance as "operatic", he notes that "Shannon takes Terence Stamp’s infamously snooty – almost Disney villain-esque – interpretation of the fearsome military leader and gives him over completely to Zack Snyder’s supercharged machismo". Fellow Screen Rant writer Jason Chamberlain shares this sentiment, writing that Zod's predetermined nature and role in Kryptonian society provided more depth to his motivations compared to Stamp's portrayal in Superman II (1980) and notes it as one of the failures of Kryptonian society.

Superman's decision to kill Zod at the end of Man of Steel was met with a divided response. While comics artists such as Grant Morrison and Neal Adams criticized the killing as unnecessary and out of character for Superman, Trey Soto of Geeks Under Grace argues that Zod forced Superman's hand, leaving him no other choice, and notes the latter's anguish in doing so. He also comments that Christopher Reeve's Superman nonchalantly kills Stamp's Zod in Superman II after stripping him of his powers. DC editor Joey Esposito opined that Superman killing Zod was the most selfless decision he could ever make. Among their reasons for the scene, Snyder and David S. Goyer cited the intention to modernize Superman for a new generation and the idea of Superman being forced to kill in his origin story making him think twice about doing it again as part of a character arc that could have been spawned in further films until he became the non-lethal hero he is in the source material. Looking back at Man of Steel in 2023, Shannon reflected that he never understood why people argued that Superman shouldn't have killed Zod because he isn't supposed to do that, which gave him some concerns over reprising his role for The Flash at first.

== See also ==
- General Zod (1978 film series character)
- Characters of the DC Extended Universe
