= The Phantom Zone =

The Phantom Zone may refer to:

- Phantom Zone, a parallel dimension used as prison for criminal Kryptonians
- The Phantom Zone, a four-issue 1982 Superman miniseries by Steve Gerber and Gene Colan
- The Phantom Zone, the tenth episode of the first season of the TV-show Krypton, which takes place 200 years before the birth of Superman
