= The Phantom Zone (comics) =

1982 Superman comic miniseries

- Publisher: DC Comics
- Publication date: January – April 1982
- Genre: Superhero
- Title(s): The Phantom Zone #1-4
- Main character(s): Superman

Creative team
- Writer(s): Steve Gerber
- Penciller(s): Gene Colan
- Inker(s): Tony DeZuniga
- Letterer(s): Milt Snapinn
- Colorist(s): Carl Gafford
- Editor(s): Dick Giordano

"The Phantom Zone" is a four-issue 1982 Superman comic book miniseries published by DC Comics.

== Plot ==
=== Issue #1: The Haunting of Charlie Kweskill! ===
Kryptonian criminals trapped in the Phantom Zone manipulate Charlie Kweskill, who is actually a powerless Kryptonian named Quex-Ul, to build a device that will set them free. The same device simultaneously traps Quex-Ul and Superman in the Phantom Zone themselves.

=== Issue #2 - Earth Under Siege! ===
The Kryptonians General Zod, Va-Kox, Jax-Ur, Kru-El, Faora, Jer-Em, Az-Rel, Nadira, and Nam-Ek are released from the Phantom Zone. While they wreak havoc on Earth, Superman and Kweskill encounter Mon-El and are sent to another level of the Phantom Zone.

=== Issue #3 - The Terror Beyond Twilight! ===
As Superman and Kweskill continue their journey through the realm of the Phantom Zone, and encounters a Kryptonian wizard named Thul-Kar, Zod and his allies have built a giant Phantom Zone projector which is powered by Green Lantern's power battery, and intends to send the whole Earth into the Phantom Zone.

=== Issue #4 - The Phantom Planet! ===
In Aethyr's realm, Kweskill regains his Kryptonian powers and sacrifices himself by being consumed by Aethyr so that Superman can escape. Breaking through the barrier of the Phantom Zone, Superman find himself back on Earth, where he allies with Supergirl to destroy the giant projector and fight the Kryptonian villains. Except for Jer-Em, Nadira and Az-Rel, who are killed during they stay on Earth, the other Kryptonians are sent back to their prison with a projector created by Green Lantern.

== Sequel ==
"The Phantom Zone"
- Publisher: DC Comics
- Publication date: September 1986
- Genre: Superhero
- Title(s): DC Comics Presents #97
- Main character(s): Superman

Creative team
- Writer(s): Steve Gerber
- Penciller(s): Rick Veitch
- Inker(s): Bob Smith
- Letterer(s): John Costanza
- Colorist(s): Gene D'Angelo
- Editor(s): Julius Schwartz

=== Superman & The Final Chapter Of The Phantom Zone Criminals ===
A sequel was published in DC Comics Presents #97, written by Steve Gerber, penciled by Rick Veitch and inked by Bob Smith. Being published in September 1986, after both Crisis on Infinite Earths, which rebooted the DC universe, and the new Superman in The Man of Steel, it was presented as "an untold tale of the Pre-Crisis universe". The sequel reveals that the Phantom Zone is not a separate dimension, but a field of consciousness surrounding the being Aethyr. To break free, it fuses with Mister Mxyzptlk. Although described as the final story set in the pre-Crisis continuity and a send-off to pre-Crisis Superman, the series contradicts the continuity due to its destruction of the Phantom Zone. This contradicts the established future of the Legion of Super-Heroes, where the Phantom Zone remains intact.
