= Injustice: Gods Among Us =

2013 video game

- North American cover art, featuring Cyborg, Wonder Woman, The Joker, The Flash, and Green Lantern in the background, and Superman, Green Arrow, and Batman in the foreground
- Developer: NetherRealm Studios (Note: High Voltage Software developed the PlayStation 4 and Windows versions of the game, while Armature Studio developed the PlayStation Vita version of the game.)
- Publishers: Warner Bros. Interactive Entertainment; Raw Thrills (arcade)
- Director: Ed Boon
- Producers: Adam Urbano; Hans P. Lo
- Designers: Paulo Garcia; John Edwards
- Artist: Steve Beran
- Writers: Brian Chard; Dominic Cianciolo; John Vogel; Jon Greenberg
- Composers: Christopher Drake; Dean Grinsfelder; Cris Velasco; Sascha Dikiciyan
- Series: Injustice
- Engine: Unreal Engine 3
- Platforms: PlayStation 3; Wii U; Xbox 360; PlayStation 4; PlayStation Vita; Windows; iOS; Android; Arcade
- Release: April 16, 2013: Original PS3, Wii U, Xbox 360; NA: April 16, 2013; AU: April 17, 2013; EU: April 19, 2013 ULTIMATE EDITION PS3, PS4, PS Vita, Windows, Xbox 360; NA: November 12, 2013; AU: November 27, 2013; EU: November 29, 2013 Mobile iOS; WW: April 3, 2013 Android; WW: November 21, 2013 Arcade; WW: October 16, 2017
- Genre: Fighting
- Modes: Single-player, multiplayer

Injustice: Gods Among Us is a 2013 fighting game developed by NetherRealm Studios and published by Warner Bros. Interactive Entertainment for the PlayStation 3, Wii U, and Xbox 360. It is the first installment in the Injustice series based upon the fictional universe of DC Comics. The storyline is set in a parallel universe within the DC Comics' Multiverse, where Superman has become a tyrant and established a new world order after the Joker tricked him into killing Lois Lane and destroying Metropolis. In an effort to stop this, Batman summons counterparts of the Justice League's members from the main universe to join his insurgency and end Superman's totalitarian regime.

The game was released in April 2013 in North America, Europe, and Australia, and in June 2013 in Japan. An expanded version, titled Injustice: Gods Among Us – Ultimate Edition, was released in November 2013 for the PlayStation 3, PlayStation 4, PlayStation Vita, Windows, and Xbox 360. A free-to-play mobile app based on Injustice was also released for iOS and Android devices, which was then ported to arcade machines by Raw Thrills in the fall of 2017, months after the sequel's release. A prequel comic book series of the same name, written by Tom Taylor, was released beginning in January 2013.

Players select one of several characters from the DC Universe (consisting of both villains and heroes) to engage in combat, aiming to knock out their opponent. The game is set in a 2.5D environment: while character models and backgrounds are rendered in three-dimensional graphics, the characters are restricted to fight within a two-dimensional space. Injustice builds upon several aspects from NetherRealm Studios' previous title, Mortal Kombat (2011), including its controls, game mechanics, narrative-driven campaign, and online functionality.

The game received positive reviews from critics, who praised its story, gameplay mechanics, and use of the DC Comics license. Injustice became the highest-selling game in the United States and United Kingdom during the month of its release. The game also won several awards for "Best Fighting Game" in 2013. A sequel, Injustice 2, was released in 2017, while an animated film adaptation, Injustice, was released in 2021.

== Gameplay ==
Wonder Woman battles Ares in the Themyscira stage. Injustice features 3D characters and backgrounds, but is played in a 2D arena.

Injustice: Gods Among Us is a fighting game in which players control characters with different fighting styles and special attacks, engaging in one-on-one combat to deplete their opponent's life gauge. The game is in 2.5D: movement is restricted to a two-dimensional plane, while the characters and backgrounds are rendered in three dimensions. Unlike the traditional fighting game design involving multiple rounds with regenerative life bars, Injustice uses a scheme similar to the Killer Instinct series. Each match consists of a single round, with each player bearing two life bars. The game utilizes a four-button control layout of light, medium, and heavy attacks, alongside a "character trait" button, which activates a unique ability or attack designed to showcase each character. For instance, Superman's character trait provides a temporary boost in strength, while Batman's character trait summons a swarm of robotic bats.

The stages, based on various locations from the DC Universe, such as the Batcave, Metropolis, and the Fortress of Solitude, feature interactive environments and multiple areas. If an opponent is hit with a heavy attack near a corner of the arena, it launches them, triggering a transition animation and taking the fight to a new section of the stage. Each section also contains objects that characters can interact with differently depending on their class. Characters fall into two classes: "power characters", who rely on brute strength and innate abilities, and "gadget characters", who use weapons, items, and other external mechanisms to win. For example, a gadget character like Batman can attach a bomb to a car to cause an explosion, while a power character like Superman will pick up the same car and smash his opponents with it. Players have the option to turn off interactive elements and stage transitions.

As characters perform special moves, block oncoming attacks, or get hit by the opponent, their "super meters" will gradually fill. Portions of the super meter can be used to execute enhanced special moves or counter enemy moves. With a full meter, players can unleash their strongest special attack. Players may also expend their meter to interrupt a combo and enter a wager battle, dubbed the "clash system", which combines individualized cutscene cinematics with the process of betting meter. A clash may be triggered by a player only after they have lost their first life bar. During the sequence, both players commit portions of their meter in secret, with the highest bidder winning the clash.

The story mode is split into several chapters. As the narrative plays out, the player swaps between different characters. Minigames are also incorporated into the story. The outcome of minigames can impact an upcoming battle, such as giving the player a health advantage over the CPU opponent. Additional game features include Battle Mode, Versus Mode, Training Mode, and S.T.A.R. Labs, which includes 240 character-specific challenges of varying difficulty. Online multiplayer modes include King of the Hill, a setup that allows up to eight players to spectate a match while waiting for their turn to fight, and Survivor, which carries over the current winner's health bar and character selection over each match. Playing through any of the game modes, including online matches with optional goal objectives, will net the player experience points that may be used to unlock alternate costumes, music, concept art, and other rewards.

== Synopsis ==
The campaign of Injustice: Gods Among Us was written by NetherRealm Studios in collaboration with DC Comics' writers. Described by NetherRealm as "Story Mode 3.0", the Injustice campaign was approached similarly to Mortal Kombat vs. DC Universe and the 2011 Mortal Kombat reboot through the use of a cinematic narrative versus the traditional ladder-based single-player experience. According to lead designer John Edwards, the plot is meant to rationalize the game's fighting mechanics between characters that would not normally fight one another and explain how Batman can "stand toe-to-toe" with Superman. Writers Justin Gray and Jimmy Palmiotti served as story consultants to ensure that the comic characters kept their proper voices in Injustice.

=== Plot ===
In an alternate reality (known as Earth-49), the Joker (Richard Epcar) tricks Superman (George Newbern) into killing a pregnant Lois Lane, which detonates a nuclear weapon that destroys Metropolis. After a grief-stricken Superman murders the Joker, he goes on to establish the One Earth Regime to enforce global peace, while Batman (Kevin Conroy) forms the Insurgency to oppose him. Five years later, in the Prime Universe, the Justice League and Teen Titans subdue various villains across Metropolis and the Watchtower. Batman learns from Lex Luthor (Mark Rolston) that the Joker plans to detonate a nuclear weapon in Metropolis, but when the heroes attempt to stop him, they, as well as the Joker, are teleported to the alternate reality.

Batman and the Joker find themselves in a rebuilt Metropolis, where they escape capture by the Regime's forces. Meanwhile, Wonder Woman (Susan Eisenberg), Aquaman (Phil LaMarr), Green Arrow (Alan Tudyk), and Green Lantern (Adam Baldwin), who were teleported to Gotham City, split up to determine the cause of their arrival. Green Lantern encounters this universe's Cyborg (Khary Payton) and Raven (Tara Strong), who have joined the Regime, and stops them from torturing a captive Deathstroke (J. G. Hertzler). He also faces and defeats Sinestro (Troy Baker) and his own Yellow Lantern counterpart. Meanwhile, Aquaman discovers his counterpart preparing to sign a peace treaty between Atlantis and the Regime and stops him. He then encounters Ares (J. G. Hertzler), who helps him escape Atlantis, revealing he has allied with the Insurgency due to the global order enforced by the Regime diminishing his powers.

After regrouping, Wonder Woman, Green Arrow, Green Lantern, and Aquaman meet the alternate Batman and Lex Luthor, the latter of whom maintains friendly relations with Superman and acts as a spy for the Insurgency. Batman and Luthor provide the heroes with nanotech pills derived from Kryptonian DNA, which increase one's strength and durability, and reveal that they summoned them to this universe to access a kryptonite weapon that could weaken Superman; however, Prime Batman and the Joker were teleported by accident. Elsewhere, Batman is captured by the Regime while the Joker meets this universe's Harley Quinn (Tara Strong), who allied with the Insurgency and founded the Joker Clan in his memory. After helping the Joker Clan fight off a Regime attack on Arkham Asylum, the Insurgents have the Joker imprisoned and infiltrate the Batcave to retrieve the kryptonite weapon, which requires the DNA of the Justice League's core members. Although they succeed in their attempt, the weapon is damaged by Black Adam (Joey Naber) during the Insurgents' escape.

In the Prime Universe, Superman, the Flash (Neal McDonough), and Cyborg attempt to recover their missing comrades, resulting in the latter being inadvertently teleported to the Regime's universe. Following some initial confusion, Cyborg joins the Insurgency and works with Deathstroke to take over the Regime Watchtower. Meanwhile, Superman discovers that the captured Batman hails from another universe and makes a public announcement about his plans to execute him, hoping to lure the Insurgency into a trap. After Wonder Woman, Green Lantern, and Aquaman stage an attack on Stryker's Island to distract the Regime, Green Arrow and the alternate Batman break into the prison to rescue Prime Batman. Despite altercations with this universe's Catwoman (Grey DeLisle) and Nightwing (Neal McDonough), who joined the Regime, they succeed in freeing Prime Batman, only to be confronted by Superman during their escape.

After the heroes use the Watchtower's teleporter to flee, Superman realizes the Watchtower has been compromised and flies towards it, but Deathstroke detonates the explosives he planted, destroying the Watchtower. The force of the explosion sends Superman plummeting towards Earth, where he is left momentarily weakened. Seeing this as an opportunity to finally kill Superman, Luthor dons a battle suit equipped with the kryptonite weapon and heads off to confront Superman. On the way, he is attacked by the Joker, who was released by Harley, but Luthor defeats him and helps Harley realize that the Joker never cared about her. Arriving at Superman's location, Luthor reveals his allegiance to the Insurgency and criticizes the Regime's hypocritical methods of achieving peace, but is stopped by Shazam (Joey Naber) before he can kill Superman, allowing the latter to recover his strength and murder Luthor.

Now aware of humanity's hatred for the Regime, Superman decides to destroy Gotham City and Metropolis and invade the Prime Universe as revenge for its heroes' interference. Shazam protests the plan, but is killed by Superman after mentioning Lois. Shocked by Shazam's death and disillusioned with the Regime's brutality, the Flash defects and informs the Insurgency of Superman's plan. As the Insurgency's hideout is attacked by Regime forces, Wonder Woman is teleported to Themyscira by Ares, who reveals the alternate Wonder Woman's plan to use the Amazons to attack Metropolis. Wonder Woman defeats her Regime counterpart and convinces the Amazons to side with the Insurgency. Meanwhile, Prime Batman persuades his counterpart to summon Prime Superman for help.

As the Insurgency's and Regime's forces clash, Prime Superman arrives to turn the tide of the battle in the Insurgency's favor. He subdues Black Adam and Sinestro, persuades Yellow Lantern to surrender, and battles Doomsday (Khary Payton), who was unleashed by the alternate Superman as a last resort. After sending Doomsday to the Phantom Zone, Superman confronts his Regime counterpart in the Fortress of Solitude, where he is appalled by the latter's plans to conquer the Prime Universe and bring its Lois to his own reality. Claiming that Lois would be horrified by the tyrant he became, Prime Superman defeats his counterpart, who is taken into custody by Batman.

In the aftermath, the Regime is disbanded and its members are arrested; the Flash willingly turns himself in, while Hal Jordan and Sinestro are taken to Oa to stand trial. Before the Prime Universe heroes and Joker return home, Prime Superman and the alternate Batman oversee the imprisonment of the former's counterpart within a cell emitting red sun radiation that renders him powerless. As Superman laments that he could fall down a similar path if he were to suffer a personal tragedy, Batman assures him that, if it happens, he will be there to stop him. After the two leave, the imprisoned Superman's eyes glow red.

== Characters ==
The roster was selected internally by NetherRealm Studios with input from DC Comics. The main goal during the selection process, which took around three to four months, was to create a cast featuring a wide variety of characters. Characters were chosen based on criteria such as size, ability, gender, popularity, and how well they fit within the Injustice storyline. The addition of each playable hero and villain required about six weeks of development. The characters were designed with the intent to make each fighter unique, and fighting styles and movesets were tailored to the lore and personality of each character. Ed Boon stated that DC Comics had given NetherRealm a large amount of freedom with their properties, allowing them to put their own spin on characters. Several other characters from the DC Universe, such as Darkseid, Scarecrow, Metallo and Gorilla Grodd, also appear as non-player characters, making cameo appearances in story cutscenes, stages and other game modes. Outside of the DC Universe, Scorpion from NetherRealm's Mortal Kombat series appears as a downloadable guest character.

The playable characters are:

- Aquaman
- Ares
- Bane
- Batgirl^{a}
- Batman^{b}
- Black Adam
- Catwoman^{b}
- Cyborg
- Deathstroke^{b}
- Doomsday
- Flash (Barry Allen)^{b}
- Green Arrow
- Green Lantern (Hal Jordan)^{b}
- Harley Quinn
- Hawkgirl (Shiera Hall)
- Joker^{b}
- Killer Frost (Louise Lincoln)
- Lex Luthor^{b}
- Lobo^{a}
- Martian Manhunter^{a}
- Nightwing (Dick Grayson)
- Raven
- Scorpion^{a} ^{b}
- Shazam^{b}
- Sinestro
- Solomon Grundy
- Superman^{b}
- Wonder Woman^{b}
- Zatanna^{a}
- Zod^{a}

Additionally, several characters are playable as alternate skins for existing characters. They include:

- Batman (Terry McGinnis)^{c}
- Batman (Thomas Wayne)^{a}
- Cyborg Superman^{a}
- Flash (Eobard Thawne)^{a}
- Flash (Jay Garrick)^{a}
- Green Lantern (John Stewart)^{a}
- Hawkgirl (Kendra Saunders)^{a}
- Nightwing (Damian Wayne)

The iOS and Android version of the game features several exclusive characters:

- Arkham Knight
- Batgirl (Cassandra Cain)
- Darkseid ^{b}
- Deadshot
- Flash (Wally West)
- Green Lantern (Jessica Cruz)
- Killer Croc
- Reverse-Flash
- Static

^a: Available as downloadable content; included in the Ultimate Edition.
^b: Previously appeared in Mortal Kombat vs. DC Universe.
^c: Unlockable in the console version through the mobile version.

== Development ==
Injustice: Gods Among Us was first announced on May 31, 2012. According to Ed Boon, the main goal heading into Injustice was to create a game outside of the Mortal Kombat series that was dramatically different within the fighting game genre. Producer Hector Sanchez stated that NetherRealm Studios did not feel constrained by the parameters of Mortal Kombat, allowing the developers to take more design risks with Injustice, such as removing Mortal Kombat's traditional dedicated block button. Similar to Boon's previous DC-related title, Mortal Kombat vs. DC Universe (2008), the use of the DC Comics license implied restrictions to the amount of violence in the game; however, Boon intended to push the "Teen" rating by replacing violence with "crazy, over-the-top action." When questioned if the studio's past experience with Mortal Kombat and its characteristic violence would influence Injustice, Boon replied that he wanted to keep the two titles as separate entities.

The online mode in Injustice was built upon the foundation laid from Mortal Kombat (2011). Due to complaints about severe lag in the online multiplayer portion of Mortal Kombat, Boon reported that the development team had looked back upon their past mistakes and created a "new, more elaborate system" for an improved online experience. Senior Producer Adam Urbano stated NetherRealm Studios spent two years of development focusing on netplay. During development, NetherRealm shared their idea for an automated system to push Injustice downloadable content to all users' consoles. The game would connect to the Internet during use and automatically download the information required for players who have bought DLC characters to play against others who have not. The system also allows NetherRealm to quickly send hotfixes to patch noticeable glitches.

Like Mortal Kombat vs. DC Universe and Mortal Kombat, Injustice runs on the Unreal Engine 3, which was modified to suit fighting games. In the first Injustice development diary, NetherRealm Studios proclaimed that several technical advancements had been made since the release of Mortal Kombat in 2011. Sanchez stated that their "KoreTech team" had pushed the boundaries on their graphics engine. Urbano added that the game features a revamped lighting solution, enabling more dynamic lighting in terms of characters and environments. A new "character material" system was created to portray characters with increased graphical detail. Injustice also utilizes a multi-threaded rendering engine, allowing the game to display approximately three times the amount of objects on screen at a single time than Mortal Kombat.

== Marketing ==
Prior to the game's release, Warner Bros. Interactive and DC Entertainment launched a 10-week-long online marketing campaign called the Injustice Battle Arena. The web series, hosted by Taryn Southern, featured weekly match-ups between the playable cast in a tournament-style format. Each week, the arena was updated with different versus scenarios. Fans could vote for their favorite characters, and a video, depicting the winner of each round, would be released following each voting period. Videos detailing the skills and strengths of the combatants, including vox pop and celebrity interviews, were released alongside each new pair of challengers. Voters could redeem free rewards, ranging from Xbox Live avatar accessories to a downloadable character skin based on Green Arrow's appearance in the television series Arrow. Participating fans based in the United States were also eligible to win weekly prizes.

A demo version of the game was released as a download for the PlayStation 3 and Xbox 360 on April 2, 2013, in North America, and April 3, 2013, in Europe. The demo showcased Batman, Wonder Woman, and Lex Luthor, in the Gotham City stage, with Doomsday as an unplayable boss.

== Release ==
Injustice: Gods Among Us was released on April 16, 2013, in North America, on April 17 in Australia, and on April 19 in Europe for the PlayStation 3, Wii U, and Xbox 360. Certain Australian retailers, including JB Hi-Fi and EB Games, broke the street date, selling copies on April 15, 2013. The release of the Wii U version of Injustice was delayed in the United Kingdom until April 26, 2013. The game was released later in Japan on June 9, 2013, for the PlayStation 3 and Wii U. It was also added to the Xbox One's library of backward compatible Xbox 360 games in December 2016.

An album featuring music from several artists including Rise Against, Depeche Mode, MSTRKRFT, Awolnation, Minus the Bear, and Zeus, was released by WaterTower Music. Titled Injustice: Gods Among Us - The Album, the album was made available at digital retailers on April 16, 2013, to coincide with the release of the game. The collection was later released on CD on April 23, 2013.

=== Pre-order bonuses ===
Warner Bros. Interactive partnered with several retail outlets on a pre-order incentive. Pre-orders from EB Games, GameStop, and Game gave players access to the Red Son Pack, a DLC pack inspired by the Superman: Red Son comic book limited series, containing alternate Red Son skins for Superman, Wonder Woman, and Solomon Grundy, and 20 additional missions set within the Red Son storyline. Pre-orders from Walmart carried the Arkham City Skin Pack, containing downloadable costumes for Batman, Catwoman, and the Joker, and a bonus copy of Mortal Kombat vs. DC Universe. Pre-orders from Best Buy and Amazon Germany included the Blackest Night DLC Pack, which featured an alternate Batman skin, based on his Black Lantern design from the Blackest Night storyline, and an exclusive "zombie mode", which transforms all characters into the undead.

=== Retail editions ===
In addition to the standard edition, the Collector's Edition was made available for purchase for the PlayStation 3 and Xbox 360, which included a steelbook case, a collectible figurine, a digital download code for the animated film Justice League: Doom, the first issue of the Injustice comic book series, and three exclusive costumes for Superman, Batman, and Wonder Woman based on their appearances in The New 52. The North American and European versions of the bundle offered different figurines. The North American release offers a 13-inch (33 cm) statue featuring Wonder Woman fighting Batman, while the European release offers a smaller 9-inch (23 cm) statue of the two. The Battle Edition, exclusive to GameStop and EB Games, included a lightweight fight stick controller and the three DLC skins. In the United Kingdom and Australia, the Special Edition was available, exclusively through Game and EB Games respectively, containing the steelbook case and the Red Son Pack.

=== Downloadable content ===
A Season Pass available to Xbox 360 and PlayStation 3 users granted access to the Flashpoint Skin Pack, featuring alternate skins for Aquaman, Deathstroke, and Wonder Woman, along with the first four downloadable characters at an overall discounted price. To prevent conflicts between online players who purchased DLC and those who did not, free compatibility packs containing additional character skins were released alongside them. On April 17, 2013, Lobo was officially revealed as the first DLC character during the Injustice Battle Arena finale. Lobo was released on May 7, 2013. On May 3, 2013, Batgirl was revealed as the second DLC character, becoming available for download on May 21, 2013. Scorpion, a recurring character from the Mortal Kombat series, was revealed as the third DLC character on June 3, 2013, and became available for download on June 11, 2013. Scorpion's appearance in Injustice featured a new costume design by comic book artist Jim Lee. The final character in the Season Pass, General Zod, was revealed on June 12, 2013, on an episode of the late-night talk show Conan. Zod was released on July 2, 2013. S.T.A.R. Labs missions for the first four DLC characters were also released as part of the Season Pass. The four DLC characters became available for Wii U owners on July 3, 2013.

On June 6, 2013, Ed Boon announced that at least one additional DLC character would be created for the game due to fan demand. Boon had previously held a poll on his Twitter to determine which DC Comics characters Injustice fans would like to see added to the game. Martian Manhunter, who had been left off the polls due to having the strongest fan demand, was revealed as the fifth DLC character during a special Injustice presentation at the 2013 Evolution Championship Series despite what happened to him in the prequel comics. Martian Manhunter was released for the Xbox 360 and PlayStation 3 on July 30, 2013, bundled together with John Stewart as an alternate skin for Green Lantern. Shortly before the release, Boon revealed on Twitter that there were further plans to develop downloadable content, with the sixth DLC character being a "big fan favorite request". On August 5, 2013, the character was revealed to be Zatanna, who placed first in the Twitter poll according to Boon. She was bundled with a new skin for Superman based on Cyborg Superman, released on August 13, 2013.

=== Mobile version ===
Prior to the game's release, NetherRealm Studios developed a free-to-play mobile app of Injustice: Gods Among Us, which was released for iOS devices on April 3, 2013. It was ported to Android systems on November 21, 2013. The app utilizes a collectible card-based battle system, and can be used to unlock bonuses in the Xbox 360 and PlayStation 3 versions of the game. The app also puts players into a group of 3 combatants to challenge famous D.C. characters.

The Wii U version does not support this feature. Multiplayer functionality was added to the iOS version in an update on April 24, 2014.

=== Related media ===
The Injustice: Gods Among Us comic book series was announced by Ed Boon on October 5, 2012, during the EB Games Expo. The series serves as a prequel detailing the events leading up to the game, as well as those that happen in the interval between Superman's murder of the Joker and the discovery of the primary universe. The series was first written by Tom Taylor and illustrated by a number of artists, including Jheremy Raapack, Mike S. Miller, Bruno Redondo, Tom Derenick, and others. The comic was released digitally beginning on January 15, 2013. It was later issued in regular comic book form, and eventually a collected edition. In December 2014, Tom Taylor announced that he would be leaving the series after writing Injustice: Year Three #14, with Brian Buccellato replacing him by continuing the story into Year Four and Five. The final chapter was released in September 2016, leaving the story incomplete. Another comic book series, titled Injustice: Ground Zero, followed afterwards, which picked up the story and concluded the retelling of the game's events from Harley Quinn's perspective.

==== Arcade adaptation ====
An arcade port of the mobile version of the game was released for arcades on October 16, 2017.

=== Injustice: Gods Among Us – Ultimate Edition ===
On October 7, 2013, Warner Bros. Interactive announced the Ultimate Edition, which includes all previously released downloadable content for Injustice: Gods Among Us. The Ultimate Edition was released on November 12 in the United States, on November 27 in Australia, and on November 29 in Europe for the PlayStation 3, PlayStation 4, PlayStation Vita, Windows, and Xbox 360. The American release was also bundled with the game's official soundtrack.

== Reception ==
=== Critical response ===
Reception

Aggregate scores
Aggregator	Score
GameRankings	VITA: 73%
Metacritic	iOS: 69/100; PS3: 78/100; WIIU: 82/100; X360: 81/100; PC: 79/100; PS4: 80/100

Review scores
Publication	Score
Electronic Gaming Monthly	9.5/10
Eurogamer	8/10
Game Informer	9/10
GameSpot	7/10
IGN	8.2/10
Official Xbox Magazine (US)	9/10

Awards
Publication	Award
Game Critics Awards: Best of E3 2012	Best Fighting Game
IGN: Best of 2013	Best Overall Fighting Game
GameTrailers: Game of the Year Awards 2013	Best Fighting Game
Game Informer: Best of 2013 Awards	Best Fighting
Spike VGX	Best Fighting Game
17th Annual D.I.C.E. Awards	Fighting Game of the Year
National Academy of Video Game Trade Reviewers	Game, Franchise Fighting

Injustice: Gods Among Us received positive reviews from critics. Aggregating review website Metacritic gave the Wii U version 82/100, the Xbox 360 version 81/100, and the PlayStation 3 version 78/100. The Ultimate Edition was given 80/100 for the PlayStation 4, and 79/100 for Windows. The iOS mobile app received mixed reviews, with 69/100.

IGN's Vince Ingenito labeled the game as "both a very good brawler and a big old sloppy love letter to fans". Ingenito praised the story mode, unique fighting game mechanics, and the overall use of the DC license, but criticized rough cutscene graphics, stating that bland textures and poorly modeled buildings eroded their visual impact. Game Informer's Andrew Reiner considered the game as "a finely tuned fighter" that "nails the spectacle of a superhero brawl". Reiner praised NetherRealm Studios for delivering a "great fighting game experience", claiming that the NetherRealm Studios' appreciation for the DC universe blended nicely with their Mortal Kombat formula.

Eurogamer's Matt Edwards praised the rich amount of single-player content, highlighting the S.T.A.R. Labs mode, but was concerned about the game's online stability, writing that improvements made over Mortal Kombat to reduce latency issues "[appeared] to be marginal rather than game changing". GameSpot's Maxwell McGee felt that while Injustice provided "a complex fighter with some unique twists", the game fell short when compared to its contemporaries. McGee was critical of the story, describing the premise as "so ridiculous it borders on parody", and lamented the lack of instructional features for new players and replay support.

Mikel Reparaz of Official Xbox Magazine praised Injustice for its "fast, destructive, and extremely accessible" gameplay, calling the game "one of the most enjoyable 2D fighters in years". Electronic Gaming Monthly's Ray Carsillo awarded the game a near-perfect score, praising the story, gameplay mechanics, and collectibles, while faulting its long and frequent load times. Brett Molina of USA Today gave the game 3.5 stars out of 4, stating that "NetherRealm [had] created an impressive video game package with Injustice, combining superheroes and villains comic book fans can appreciate with a fighting style that should appeal to players at any level."

=== Awards ===
Injustice: Gods Among Us won the award for "Best Fighting Game" of E3 2012 by the Game Critics Awards. The game also received "Fighting Game of the Year" awards in 2013 from IGN, GameTrailers, Game Informer, the VGX, and the Academy of Interactive Arts & Sciences' D.I.C.E. Awards. At the 2013 National Academy of Video Game Trade Reviewers (NAVGTR) awards Injustice: Gods Among Us won Game, Franchise Fighting. At the 2014 SXSW Gaming Awards, Injustice: Gods Among Us won the Excellence in Convergence Award.

=== Sales ===
Injustice: Gods Among Us was the highest selling game in the United States during its release month of April, 2013. It sold 424,000 copies as reported by industry analysts Cowen and Company, the only game released during that month to sell more than 250,000 copies. According to the NPD group, the game would later continue to stay as the top selling game in the US charts into May and stayed within the top 10 in June. Injustice would also top the all-format game charts in the UK following its week of release.

=== Regional ban ===
The game was temporarily banned in the United Arab Emirates and Kuwait. Originally, the title of the game was rebranded as Injustice: The Mighty Among Us for promotional uses in those areas. It is speculated that Injustice was banned because of the inclusion of the word "Gods" in the title (as referring to God in the plural is against the shahada), the cleavage exposed in the outfits of some female characters, and overall bloodiness. There is also a chance that the global tagline of the game itself may have been thought as a violation or inconsideration for Islamic morals in the United Arab Emirates. Eventually, the ban in the United Arab Emirates and Kuwait was lifted.

== Sequel ==
On June 8, 2016, Injustice 2 was announced by Warner Bros. Interactive Entertainment and NetherRealm Studios; it was released on May 16, 2017, for the PlayStation 4 and Xbox One. The sequel continues the story established in Injustice: Gods Among Us, with the alternate universe Batman and his Insurgents working to prevent a new threat while stopping the remnants of Superman's Regime who seek to restore his rule. Various gameplay mechanics from the first installment return, including super moves, character traits, stage transitions, and clashes. Injustice 2 introduces a loot-dropping system, known as the "Gear System", which provides character-specific costume pieces and equipment; players are able to customize the look of their characters and upgrade their abilities, such as increasing their speed, strength, or health.

== In other media ==
On May 19, 2021, it was announced that an animated Injustice film was in the works as part of the DC Universe Animated Original Movies line. The film stars a different voice cast from the games, with the story being a loose adaptation of the Year One arc from the Injustice comic series. The film was released digitally on October 12, and on DVD and Blu-ray on October 19, 2021.
