= Quex-Ul =

- Quex-Ul on the first page of Superman #157.

Publication information
- Publisher: DC Comics
- First appearance: Superman #157 (November 1962)
- Created by: Curt Swan; Edmond Hamilton

In-story information
- Species: Kryptonian
- Place of origin: Krypton
- Notable aliases: Charlie Kweskill
- Abilities: Superhuman strength, stamina, endurance, speed, agility, reflexes, longevity, and senses; Flight; Heat vision; Invulnerability; Ice and wind breath; Solar radiation absorption

Quex-Ul is a supervillain appearing in American comic books published by DC Comics. He is depicted as an enemy of Superman, although they are also sometimes allies.

Quex-Ul has made limited appearances in media outside comics, primarily in association with Superman. He is portrayed by Gordon Alexander in Krypton and voiced by Jason J. Lewis in Justice League Action.

== Publication history ==
Quex-Ul first appeared in Superman #157 (1962) and was created by Curt Swan and Edmond Hamilton.

== Fictional character biography ==
=== Pre-Crisis ===
First appearing in Superman #157 (Nov. 1962), Quex-Ul was a Kryptonian exiled to the Phantom Zone when he was convicted of killing Rondors, an endangered species, to use their healing horns for the purpose of profit. He confessed and spent his time in the Zone, but was released by Superman when his time was up. Not a grateful sort, he attempted to lure Superman into a gold kryptonite trap, until Superman discovered that Quex-Ul had actually been controlled by another Kryptonian, Rog-Ar, the true rondor killer. Learning this, Quex-Ul threw himself into the trap to save Superman, losing his powers and memory.

In the 1982 series The Phantom Zone, Quex-Ul works at the Daily Planet, believing himself to be a human named "Charlie Kweskill". Susceptible to unconscious influence by Phantom Zoners, he unwittingly frees them and is himself trapped in the Zone along with Superman. Together they seek a way out of the Zone, ultimately facing a malevolent entity called Aethyr, whose mind creates the Phantom Zone. Quex-Ul flies towards Aethyr and sacrifices himself to save Superman.

=== Post-Crisis ===
Panel from Superman #22 (October 1988). Superman (left) executing General Zod, Quex-Ul and Zaora (center left to right). Art by John Byrne.

In the Pocket Universe (an alternate version of the pre-Crisis Earth-One), Quex-Ul was freed with General Zod and Zaora from the Phantom Zone by a naive Lex Luthor, whereupon they turned Pocket Earth into a dead world. Quex-Ul and the others were executed by Superman using Kryptonite, a controversial move that haunted him for some time.

=== Adventure Comics ===
In Adventure Comics #512 (May 2010), Quex-Ul makes an appearance under the cover name of Edward Robertson. He is later killed by Squad K of Project 7734.

== Powers and abilities ==
As a Kryptonian, Quex-Ul has superpowers derived from under the light of Earth's yellow Sun in the Solar System. His basic abilities are sufficient for him to bend steel, overpower a locomotive, leap over a tall building in one bound, and outrun a speeding bullet, as well as virtual invulnerability, accelerated recovery, laser eyebeams, vortex breath, and flight. He possesses extraordinary senses of hearing and sight, including x-ray, telescopic, and microscopic vision. Like all Kryptonians, he is vulnerable to Kryptonite, red sunlight, and magic.

== In other media ==
=== Television ===
- Quex-Ul appears in Justice League Action, voiced by Jason J. Lewis. This version was imprisoned in the Phantom Zone alongside General Zod and Faora.
- Quex-Ul appears in the Krypton episode "House of El", portrayed by Gordon Alexander. This version is a member of Krypton's military guild and commander of the Sagitari squadron before he is killed by one of his soldiers, Lyta-Zod, for his position.

=== Miscellaneous ===
Quex-Ul appears in several Choose Your Own Adventure-type novels, as a prominent prisoner of the Phantom Zone who was reputed to be powerful without a yellow sun's rays, but not exceptionally intelligent, relying on General Zod for orders.
