= Jor-El =

Fictional character appearing in DC Comics

- Jor-El as depicted in The Adventures of Superman #589 (February 2001). Art by Paul Rivoche.

Publication information
- Publisher: DC Comics
- First appearance: Superman comic strip (January 16, 1939)
- Created by: Jerry Siegel (writer); Joe Shuster (artist)

In-story information
- Full name: Jor-El
- Species: Kryptonian
- Place of origin: Krypton
- Team affiliations: Science Council
- Notable aliases: Jor-L (in the Golden Age); Mister Oz (in "DC Rebirth")
- Abilities: Genius-level intellect; Proficient scientist, inventor, and engineer; Utilizes technologically advanced equipment; Skilled martial artist and hand-to-hand combatant

Jor-El is a character appearing in American comic books published by DC Comics. Created by writer Jerry Siegel and artist Joe Shuster, Jor-El first appeared in the Superman newspaper comic strip in 1939.

Jor-El is Superman's biological father, the husband of Lara, and a leading scientist on the planet Krypton before its destruction. He foresees his planet's fate but is unable to convince his colleagues in time to rescue most of Krypton's inhabitants. Jor-El is able to save his infant son Kal-El (Superman) by launching him towards Earth in a homemade spaceship just moments before Krypton explodes. When Superman later constructs his headquarters, the Fortress of Solitude, he honors his biological parents with the inclusion of a statue of Jor-El and Lara holding up a globe of Krypton. The fortress also holds a holographic copy of Jor-El's consciousnesses, letting Superman interact with his father for advice and knowledge.

Jor-El was portrayed by Marlon Brando in the films Superman and Superman II. Archival footage cut from the prior films was used with the permission of Brando's estate to insert the deceased Brando into 2006's Superman Returns in a reprise of the role. Terence Stamp played the voice of Jor-El in the television series Smallville and was portrayed by Julian Sands. The character was then portrayed by Russell Crowe in the DC Extended Universe film Man of Steel (2013) and by Bradley Cooper in the DC Universe film Superman (2025). Angus Macfadyen portrayed the character in the first season of the television series Superman & Lois.

== Fictional character biography ==
=== Precursor (New Adventure Comics) ===
Joe Shuster and Jerry Siegel, the creators of both Superman and Jor-L, first introduced a character named Jor-L in 1936, more than a year before the first Superman story was published. The original Jor-L appeared in New Adventure Comics (released in 1936, cover-dated January 1937), a re-titled issue #12 of the previous New Comics, which would be re-titled again, starting with issue #32, as the 45-year-long Adventure Comics series.

Featured in the four-page Shuster and Siegel strip Federal Men, this Jor-L is not an extraterrestrial but, instead, a far-future "ace sleuth" in the service of "Interplanetary Federation Headquarters". The character battles "Nira-Q", the outer-space-faring "bandit queen", in the year 3000 A.D. The 1936 Jor-L exists as part of a story within a story, as Shuster and Siegel's strip presents the tale as a scientist's forecast of future crime-fighting told to the contemporary 1930s-era G-man heroes of Federal Men.

=== Golden Age and Silver Age versions ===
Jor-El was first referred to indirectly in Action Comics #1 in 1938, which only mentioned a scientist who sends his son to Earth. He made his first full-fledged appearance in the Superman newspaper comic strip on January 16, 1939, where his name was spelled as Jor-L. His name first appeared as being spelled Jor-el in the Superman novel The Adventures of Superman (1942), written by George Lowther. Later comic books capitalized the "E" in "El." Jor-El's first appearance in a comic book was in More Fun Comics #101.

In the 1960s, now known as part of the Silver Age of Comic Books, DC Comics introduced to its superhero stories the fictional concept of different versions of characters from real-world publication history existing in separate "universes" that could communicate with each other. As DC developed this concept through further stories, the version of Superman's father during the previous Golden Age of Comic Books was identified as Jor-L, matching the original spelling of the character's name, who lived on the Krypton of the Earth-Two "universe" (derived from the versions of characters and stories that appeared during the earlier Golden Age period of publication history). In contrast, the concept presented Jor-El as no longer another spelling of the same name but a different character entirely: the father of the then-contemporary Silver Age version of Superman, who lived on the Krypton of Earth-One (used to describe the setting for then-current Silver Age stories and characters, some of which had been substantially changed from their Golden Age versions).

A retelling of Superman's origin story in 1948 first delved into detail about Jor-El. However, his formal and more familiar Silver Age aspects were firmly established starting in the late 1950s. Over the course of the next several decades, there was a definitive summarization in the miniseries World of Krypton in 1979 (not to be confused with the similarly-named post-Crisis on Infinite Earths late-1980s comic miniseries).

==== Accomplishments ====
As presented in the World of Krypton miniseries and other stories from the Silver Age of Comic Books, Jor-El is Krypton's leading scientist, inventing, among other devices, a self-titled hovercar. He also discovers a parallel plane of existence which he calls the Phantom Zone and invents a device that can open portals to it. This device gets him a seat on the Science Council, Krypton's ruling body. He lives in Krypton's major city of Kryptonopolis.

Even before Jor-El's birth, the House of El is renowned for its contributions to Kryptonian society. Ancestors of Jor-El include Val-El, a famed explorer; Sul-El, the inventor of Krypton's first telescope; Tala-El, the author of Krypton's first planetary constitution; Hatu-El, the inventor of Krypton's first electromagnet and electric motor; and Gam-El, who is credited with pioneering modern Kryptonian architecture.

==== Family life ====
Family emblem of the House of El, the popular logo of his son, Kal-El

Jor-El has two brothers: Zor-El, who lives in Argo City and eventually becomes the father of Kara, alias Supergirl, and an identical twin brother named Nim-El, who lives in Kandor. In several stories, Jor-El's father is established as Jor-El I, and his mother as Nimda (née An-Dor). Jor-El eventually meets and marries Lara, the daughter of Lor-Van and a young astronaut in Krypton's fledgling space program, which is shut down after Jax-Ur destroys Krypton's moon Wegthor.

==== Jor-El's warnings of Krypton's doom ====
When Krypton begins experiencing a series of earthquakes, Jor-El investigates. He soon discovers, to his horror, that Krypton's core is extremely unstable and radioactive, and will eventually reach critical mass and explode, taking the entire planet and its populace with it. Jor-El tries to convince the members of the Science Council of this impending disaster and urges re-establishing Krypton's space program so giant spacecraft can be built to carry the populace to another habitable world. However, the Council is dismissive of Jor-El's findings and refuses to consider evidence of his claims. Some go so far as to accuse Jor-El of plotting to overthrow the Council, as Dru-Zod had tried and failed to do so years earlier.

Around the time he discovers Krypton's impending doom, Jor-El meets his own son Kal-El without realizing it, after Kal-El accidentally travels back in time. There are a small number of Kryptonians who believe Jor-El and put together a large ark ship to evacuate Kandor's population, but when the city is unexpectedly shrunken and stolen by Brainiac, Jor-El loses his only chance to save any of Krypton's people from their impeding deaths.

Jor-El resorts to researching a means of getting his own family to safety. This work includes launching several smaller test rockets; one of these rockets includes the family dog Krypto. However, as time runs short, Jor-El only has a craft large enough to carry his infant son Kal-El. He decides to send Kal-El to Earth, having determined through scientific analysis that he will gain superhuman powers under Earth's yellow sun and lower gravity. As Krypton goes through its final destructive stages, Jor-El and Lara place their son in the rocket and launch him towards Earth, mere seconds before they are killed when Krypton's core implodes and the planet is instantly destroyed. It is later revealed that Jor-El had asked Lara to leave with their son, as there was just enough room for her in his spacecraft, but his wife had refused, wanting to give their son the best chance possible to survive.

=== Post-Crisis ===
After the 1985–1986 miniseries Crisis on Infinite Earths and John Byrne's 1986 miniseries The Man of Steel rewrote Superman's origins, details about Jor-El's background and character were changed. In Byrne's version, Jor-El inhabits a cold and emotionally sterile Krypton where even bodily contact is forbidden. Indeed, Jor-El himself is considered a "throwback" for expressing emotions toward Lara and favoring the less sterilized days of past Kryptonian eras. Another change in this version is Jor-El genetically altering his son's fetus (gestating in a "birthing matrix") to allow him to leave Krypton (in this version of the mythos, Kryptonians are genetically "bonded" to the planet itself, not allowing them to leave) and attaching a warp engine to the matrix instead of constructing a ship wholesale. The result is that Kal-El is "born" when the birthing matrix opens on Earth.

In the 1990s series Starman Jor-El meets a time-traveling Jack Knight and Mikaal Tomas, two individuals who both bear at various points the name "Starman", and are accidentally sent 70 years back in time and hurled across space. Jor-El thereby first learns of Earth's existence; in return, Jor-El helps Knight and Tomas escape from his overbearing father Seyg-El.

In the 2004 miniseries Superman: Birthright, Jor-El, along with Krypton and Lara, was, more or less, reinstated to his Silver Age versions, though with such updated touches as Lara contributing equally to the effort of sending Kal-El, once again an infant while on Krypton, to Earth. In this version, Jor-El discovers Earth moments before launching his son's spacecraft. Also, the conclusion of the miniseries has the adult Superman, on Earth, seeing his parents through Lex Luthor's time-space communicator, and on Krypton, seconds before its destruction, Jor-El and Lara see their son alive and well on Earth and know that their efforts are successful. As with Byrne's conflicting view of Krypton, the Birthright origins of Jor-El, Krypton, and Luthor have been retconned, and, following Infinite Crisis, they are no longer valid in comics canon.

However, a more recent storyline co-written by Geoff Johns and Superman director Richard Donner presented yet another version of Jor-El and Krypton which reintroduced General Zod and the Phantom Zone criminals. With art by Adam Kubert, Jor-El is depicted for the first time with a beard and the design of Kryptonian society is distinct yet again from Birthright and Man of Steel, incorporating elements of Donner's work on the first two Christopher Reeve films, in particular the notion of Krypton's Council threatening Jor-El with harsh penalty of exile to the Phantom Zone if he is to make public his predictions of their planet's imminent doom or otherwise attempt to "create a climate of panic."

Jor-El is shown here to have been mentored by friend and noted scientist Non, who corroborates Jor-El's findings regarding Krypton's impending destruction, when the two are arrested and brought to trial before the Council by Zod and Ursa. When Non defies the Council's dire prohibitions and elects to spread the word of the coming apocalypse, he is abducted by Council agents and apparently lobotomized, thus explaining the character's mute simple-mindedness, brutality and destructiveness in line with Jack O'Halloran's performance as Non in the first two Reeve films. Appalled, Zod and Ursa propose to Jor-El that they band together and overthrow the Council, but Jor-El will have none of it. When their murderous insurrection fails, the Council forces Jor-El to exile them to the Phantom Zone and never speak of his findings again, lest he face the same fate. For this perceived betrayal, Zod declares that he will escape and conquer Krypton (confident that Jor-El will discover some way to save the planet) and force the scientist and his son to kneel before him one day.

Having been re-built via a Kryptonian crystal during the One Year Later story arc, the current version of the Fortress of Solitude, which is also designed to essentially be visually identical to the Donner and Bryan Singer films, now contains an advanced interactive "recording" of Jor-El which, although visually dissimilar to Marlon Brando, is otherwise identical in function to that featured in Superman Returns.

Superman/Batman #50 presents Jor-El sending a probe to Earth that makes contact with Thomas Wayne while he is on a drive with a pregnant Martha, the probe holographically transmitting Thomas' consciousness to Krypton so that Jor-El can better learn what kind of world Earth is to help him decide which of many possible candidates he should send his son to. Thomas tells Jor-El that the people of Earth are not perfect, but are essentially a good and kind race who will raise the child right, convincing Jor-El to send Kal-El there. Thomas records his encounter in a diary, which is discovered by his son Bruce Wayne in the present day.

=== "The New 52" and "DC Rebirth" ===
The New 52 version of the character on the cover of Superman (vol. 3) #0 by Kenneth Rocafort

Jor-El on the cover of Action Comics #989 (2017) by Jay Leisten and Neil Edwards

Following two line-wide revisions of DC superhero comic books, branded by DC Comics as "The New 52" and "DC Rebirth", Jor-El was revised to be still alive due to being rescued by Doctor Manhattan. After being nursed back to health by locals, Jor-El sees firsthand the atrocities of man and becomes Mister Oz. Jor-El becomes dissatisfied with humanity and attempts to force his son and his family to leave in the belief that Earth cannot be saved, but when Superman forces him to acknowledge that he is attacking his own son, he withdraws. It is later established that Jor-El is a member of the Circle, a clandestine organization composed of powerful cosmic beings and intergalactic rulers including Appa Ali Apsa, Sardath, and Rogol Zaar, the being who destroyed Krypton. Jor-El is later discovered to have created Rogol Zaar and is transported back in time to die.

== Other versions ==
- An alternate universe variant of Jor-El appears in Superman: The Last Family of Krypton. This version survived Krypton's destruction and accompanied Lara and Kal-El to Earth, where he sets up the corporation JorCorp while Lara establishes the self-help movement 'Raology'.
- An alternate universe variant of Jor-El appears in Superman Adventures. This version is a resident of a Kryptonian city that survived Krypton's destruction. After the 'prime' Superman arrives in this world, Jor-El destroys the city to send him home.
- An alternate universe variant of Jor-El appears in Absolute Superman. This version is a miner of the labor class of Krypton, cast down from the Science League for questioning their authority. Discovering Krypton is about to be destroyed, he and Lara create nanotech spacesuits that will get their family and others off planet. It's unclear if he and Lara survived.
- An alternate universe variant of Jor-El appears in Superman: Father of Tomorrow. This version is the sole survivor of Krypton's destruction who, upon arriving on Earth, becomes this world's Superman and also uses Kryptonian science to help humanity.

== In other media ==
=== Television ===
==== Live-action ====
Tom Welling as young Jor-El in Smallville episode "Memoria"

Julian Sands as Jor-El in the Smallville episode "Kandor"

- Jor-El appears in the Adventures of Superman episode "Superman on Earth", portrayed by an uncredited Robert Rockwell.
- Jor-El appears in Lois & Clark: The New Adventures of Superman episode "The Foundling", portrayed by David Warner.
- Jor-El appears in Smallville, portrayed by Julian Sands and voiced by Terence Stamp while Tom Welling portrays a young version in the episode "Memoria". This version was a close friend of Major Zod and initially employed manipulation and physical harm while guiding Clark Kent.
- Jor-El appears in the pilot episode of Supergirl, portrayed by an uncredited actor.
- A holographic Jor-El appears in Superman & Lois, portrayed by Angus Macfadyen. This version is an advisor to Superman who is ultimately destroyed by Tal-Rho.

==== Animation ====
Jor-El (right) as he appears in Superman: The Animated Series

- Jor-El appears in the Super Friends franchise:
  - Jor-El first appears in the Super Friends (1973) episode "The Planet Splitter", voiced by Casey Kasem.
  - Jor-El appears in the Challenge of the Superfriends episode "Secret Origins of The Super Friends", voiced by G. Stanley Jones.
  - Jor-El appears in the Super Friends (1980) episode "The Krypton Syndrome", voiced by Philip L. Clarke.
- Jor-El appears in series set in the DC Animated Universe (DCAU), voiced by Christopher McDonald.
  - Jor-El first appears in Superman: The Animated Series. This version attempted to convince Krypton's leaders of its impending destruction but was denounced by Brainiac, who secretly planned to save himself and Krypton's knowledge.
  - Jor-El appears in a photograph in the Justice League two-part episode "Twilight".
  - A dream world incarnation of Jor-El appears in the Justice League Unlimited episode "For the Man Who Has Everything".
- Jor-El appears in the Pinky and the Brain episode "Two Mice and a Baby", voiced by Jeff Bennett.
- Jor-El makes a cameo appearance in the Dilbert episode "The Delivery".
- Jor-El makes a non-speaking appearance in a flashback in the Legion of Super Heroes episode "Message in a Bottle". This version was initially able to prevent Krypton's destruction with a device called the Messenger, which can convert matter to crystal and replace unstable matter. The Messenger was housed in a temple in Kandor before Brainiac took it when he stole and shrunk the city; dooming Krypton.
- Jor-El appears in The Looney Tunes Show episode "Best Friends", voiced by Jeff Bergman.
- Jor-El appears in Smallville Legends: Kara and the Chronicles of Krypton.
- Jor-El appears in My Adventures with Superman, voiced by Jason Marnocha.This version is a descendant of the Kryptonian Empire, would die alongside Lara in the annihilation of Krypton by Brainiac, and would appear to Kal-El in the present as a hologram based on artificial intelligence in the Fortress of Solitude.

=== Films ===
==== Live-action ====
- Jor-El appears in Superman (1948), portrayed by Nelson Leigh.
- Jor-El appears in Man of Steel (2013), portrayed by Russell Crowe.Rejecting the Kryptonian tradition of eugenics and artificial birth, this version stole the Kryptonian genetic codex to preserve the Kryptonian race and provide his son Kal-El with the distinction of choosing his own destiny, before killed by General Zod during a coup d'état.
- Jor-El appears in Superman (2025), portrayed by Bradley Cooper. This version sent Kal-El to subjugate Earth and revive the Kryptonian race in addition to surviving Krypton's destruction.

===== 1978 series =====
- Jor-El appears in Superman (1978), portrayed by Marlon Brando. This film originated the idea of Superman's "S"-shield symbol originally being the family crest of the House of El, which coincidentally resembles an Earth "S". Originally conceived by Brando himself and suggested on-set, this origin of the Superman symbol has been used in many stories since. In the current comics, the shield is the Kryptonian symbol for "hope" and adorns all manner of Kryptonian flags, clothing, spaceships, and equipment in addition to Jor-El's attire.
- Jor-El was intended to appear in Superman II, portrayed again by Marlon Brando, before differences behind the scenes caused his footage to be cut. Nonetheless, it was later restored for the 2006 revised version, Superman II: The Richard Donner Cut, in which he posthumously attempts to guide and inform Kal-El via historical crystals.
- Jor-El appears in Superman Returns, portrayed again by Marlon Brando via archival footage.

==== Animation ====
- Jor-El makes a non-speaking appearance in All-Star Superman.
- An alternate universe variant of Jor-El appears in Justice League: Gods and Monsters.
- Jor-El appears in The Lego Batman Movie.
- Jor-El, based on Marlon Brando's portrayal, appears in Teen Titans Go! To the Movies, voiced by Fred Tatasciore.
- Jor-El appears in Superman: Man of Tomorrow.
- Jor-El appears in Teen Titans Go! & DC Super Hero Girls: Mayhem in the Multiverse, voiced again by Fred Tatasciore.
- Jor-El appears in Batman and Superman: Battle of the Super Sons, voiced by Nolan North.
- Jor-El appears in DC League of Super-Pets, voiced by Alfred Molina.

=== Video games ===
- Jor-El appears in the Superman Returns video game.
- Jor-El appears in DC Universe Online, voiced by William Price.
- A statue of Jor-El appears in Mortal Kombat vs. DC Universe.
- Jor-El appears as a character summon in Scribblenauts Unmasked: A DC Comics Adventure.
- The Man of Steel incarnation of Jor-El appears in Lego Batman 3: Beyond Gotham, voiced by Nolan North.

=== Literature ===
- Jor-El appears in Superman: Last Son of Krypton (1978), by Elliot S. Maggin. This version sent a navigation probe ahead of Kal-El's spaceship to find a suitable foster parent among his new planet's leading scientific minds.
- Jor-El appears in The Last Days of Krypton (2007), by Kevin J. Anderson. This version was considered a scientific hero.

== See also ==
- Superman dynasty
