= General Zod =

DC Comics character

- Zod taken from the variant cover of Kneel Before Zod #1 (January 2024).; Art by C Bjorn Barends.

Publication information
- Publisher: DC Comics
- First appearance: Adventure Comics #283 (April 1961)
- Created by: Robert Bernstein; George Papp

In-story information
- Full name: Dru-Zod
- Species: Kryptonian
- Place of origin: Krypton
- Team affiliations: Kryptonian Military Guild; Superman Revenge Squad; Suicide Squad
- Partnerships: Ursa (wife); Lor-Zod (son); Non; Faora Hu-Ui; Jax-Ur
- Abilities: See list: Superhuman strength, stamina, endurance, speed, agility, reflexes, intelligence, longevity, and hearing; Solar radiation absorption; Enhanced vision; EM spectrum vision; Infra-red vision; Microscopic vision; Telescopic vision; X-ray vision; Invulnerability; Ice and wind breath; Heat vision; Flight; Military mastery

Dru-Zod, better known as General Zod, is a supervillain appearing in American comic books published by DC Comics, commonly as an adversary of the superhero Superman. The character, who first appeared in Adventure Comics #283 (April 1961), was created by Robert Bernstein and initially designed by George Papp. As a Kryptonian, he exhibits the same powers and abilities as Superman and is consequently viewed as one of his greatest enemies alongside Lex Luthor, Darkseid, and Brainiac. He is also well known for his catchphrase "Kneel before Zod!"

Originally bald and clean-shaven, Zod's look in popular culture was defined by the character's depiction by Terence Stamp in the films Superman (1978) and Superman II (1980). Eventually, the character was reintroduced to the comics with black hair and a goatee similar to Stamp's portrayal. Zod was also portrayed by Michael Shannon in the DC Extended Universe films Man of Steel (2013), Batman v Superman: Dawn of Justice (2016), and The Flash (2023).

== Fictional character biography ==
=== Silver Age ===
Dru-Zod is a megalomaniacal Kryptonian military commander. When Krypton's space program was abolished after Jax-Ur's destruction of the inhabited moon Wegthor, Zod staged an uprising against the planet's ruling council, using an army of robotic duplicates of himself resembling Bizarro. He is sentenced to exile in the Phantom Zone for 40 years for his crimes. In the present, Superman releases Zod from imprisonment, hoping to learn more about his homeworld. Zod, quickly realizing that he has powers under Earth's sun, attacks Clark and vows to conquer the planet. After a lengthy fight, Superman manages to trap him once again in the Phantom Zone.

During the remaining years before Crisis on Infinite Earths, Zod and other Zone inmates such as Jax-Ur, Faora, and others, escape from the Phantom Zone and battle Superman and Supergirl numerous times, always being defeated in the end and returned to the Zone.

=== Modern Age ===
==== Interim Zods: 1985–2005 ====
General Zod in The Adventures of Superman #589 (April 2001). Art by Duncan Rouleau and Marlo Alquiza.

The first Zod to be introduced following Crisis on Infinite Earths is the Zod of a so-called "pocket universe" resembling pre-Crisis continuity; this allowed for a "Kryptonian" Zod to be introduced while maintaining Superman's status as the last of his race in the universe proper. This Zod's universe is created by the Time Trapper. Zod (along with companions Quex-Ul and Zaora) devastates the Earth of that universe following the death of its Superboy, despite the efforts of a Supergirl created by that world's heroic Lex Luthor. The survivors of this world manage to contact the Superman of the main universe to help them, and he is able to take away the powers of the three super-criminals with gold kryptonite; since he is not from that universe, the kryptonite of that reality has no effect on him.

However, the three vow to some day regain their powers and return to Superman's world to kill him. Acknowledging that he can neither afford to leave them on the now-dead pocket Earth to let them die alone nor imprison them on his world, Superman is forced to kill them with green kryptonite.

A second incarnation of General Zod is introduced in the 2001 storyline "Return to Krypton"; this Zod is portrayed as that of an alternate reality created by Brainiac 13. He is the head of the Kryptonian military in the alternate reality. Like the pre-Crisis version, Zod holds the Kryptonian equivalent of fascist beliefs. He sends aliens to the bottle city of Kandor and plans a military coup. Zod is defeated by Superman and the Jor-El of Zod's alternate reality Krypton.

The third attempt to bring Zod to Modern Age comics is the "Russian" Zod, a Zod of human origin whose origin story is connected to Superman's. This General Zod (born Avruiskin) is a Russian who was affected before his birth by his parents' exposure to kryptonite radiation. As such, he is empowered by red sunlight and weakened by yellow, the opposite of Superman. After his parents die from radiation, he grows up in a KGB laboratory under the name Zed. Apparently spoken to by the spirit of the Pocket Universe Zod, Russian Zod creates armor which filters the sunlight, and declares himself ruler of Pokolistan. After several inconclusive encounters with Superman, he reveals his long-range plan to turn the sun red and take Superman's place. This is temporarily successful until Lex Luthor rescues Superman, gives him a blast of yellow solar radiation to regain his powers, and works to restore the sun. Superman returns to battle Zod, but refuses to kill him. When the sun turns yellow again, the now-vulnerable Zod strikes Superman with all his power at super-speed and is killed due to Superman's invulnerability.

The final Zod before the character was finally reintroduced, the Zod of an alternate Phantom Zone appears in the twelve-issue For Tomorrow storyline, written by Brian Azzarello and penciled by Jim Lee. This Zod lives alone in an alternate Phantom Zone and resents Superman for tampering with it. By his own account he comes from the same Krypton as Superman and was exiled to the Phantom Zone by Superman's father, Jor-El. This Zod wears large, spiked black armor and when unmasked, is a bald, white-bearded old man. This incarnation also uses a variation of "Kneel before Zod". He appears in Metropia, a version of the Phantom Zone created by Superman to resemble a living world (including apparently-living beings). This version was superseded by the present storyline (which features a new Zod, freed from the Phantom Zone).

==== General Zod returns: 2006–2011 ====
General Zod returns to post-Infinite Crisis comics in Last Son, penned by Geoff Johns, Richard Donner, and Adam Kubert. Dru-Zod II, Ursa, and Non escape from the Phantom Zone and come to Earth to try to turn it into a "New Krypton". This incarnation is the first Post-Crisis Zod who comes from Superman's Krypton, and not from an alternate reality.

General Zod as depicted in Countdown #30 (October 2007). Art by Gary Frank and Jon Sibal.

The backstory for the three Kryptonians was recounted in Action Comics Annual #10 (April 2007), and Zod's origin was revealed in Countdown #30 (October 2007). Prior to the destruction of Krypton, Zod, his wife Ursa, and accomplice Non rebel against their planet's oppressive government, but soon become lawless would-be tyrants who lust for power. After an ill-fated insurrection led by Zod, the government sentences the trio to death. However, Superman's father Jor-El pleads for the government to mitigate their sentence to imprisonment in the Phantom Zone, accepted on the condition that he would assume responsibility as their jailer. While in the Phantom Zone, Zod and Ursa are able to have a child who is born immune to the Phantom Zone's effects, ultimately facilitating their escape, and name him Lor-Zod. On Earth, the boy is discovered by Superman and his wife Lois Lane, who adopt him as their own son and name him Chris Kent.

Alongside Zod, Ursa and Non, 25 other Kryptonian criminals also escape the Zone and defeat a number of Earth's heroes, beginning their quest to conquer the planet. Zod ambushes Superman in revenge for Jor-El's actions and traps him in the Phantom Zone, which he later escapes with the help of the heroic Phantom Zone prisoner Mon-El. With assistance from his traditional enemies Lex Luthor, Metallo, Parasite and Bizarro, Superman takes on Zod's army. Out of nearly thirty Kryptonians, Superman's temporary allies successfully kill several, driving the rest back into the Phantom Zone alongside Zod and Ursa, who take Chris Kent with them.

General Zod in Action Comics #845 (January 2007). Art by Adam Kubert.

In the later New Krypton arc storyline however, Zod is freed from the Phantom Zone once again by Supergirl's mother Alura. The "bottled city of Kandor" is transformed into a populated Kryptonian planet ("New Krypton"), and Zod is appointed the leader of its army. In the "World of New Krypton" Action Comics storyline, when Superman decides to see what life is like on New Krypton, he is drafted into the Military Guild under General Zod. Zod and Superman maintain a mistrustful professional relationship. Despite their past, neither seems prepared to behave with marked aggression toward the other. Later, during a Kryptonian ceremony, Zod is shot by the Kryptonian Ral-Dar (who is working with Lois's father Sam Lane), leading Zod to appoint Superman as temporary General until his recovery. The two are involved in a Kryptonian political plot, but ultimately apprehend the planet's traitor and see a reform of New Krypton's Council.

Peace is short-lived, however, due to an attack by the alien Brainiac, who had been responsible for the bottling of Kandor in the first place. In Last Stand of New Krypton, New Krypton comes under attack by Brainiac, and Zod engineers a plan to defeat him; Zod is driven by an urge to avenge his prior defeat at the hands of the Coluan Brainiac, when Kandor was bottled from Old Krypton. The storyline ends with the planet's destruction, leading Zod to declare war on Earth, sparking the War of the Supermen storyline. After a fierce conflict between Superman and Zod in defense of Earth, Zod is pushed back into the Phantom Zone by his son, Chris Kent, who had freed himself from the Phantom Zone and became active as an adult superhero on Earth.

==== The New 52: 2011–2016 ====
In 2011, DC chose to revamp its continuity, rebooting many characters while retaining the histories for some others, as part of its The New 52 publishing event. Zod is reintroduced in Action Comics #23.2: General Zod (September 2013), written by Greg Pak, with art by Ken Lashley.

A new origin for Zod is introduced. In it, Zod is born to scientist parents. When he is a young boy, Zod and his parents travel to Krypton's wilderness to discover new creatures. Their ship is attacked by the creatures, leaving the family stranded in the jungle. While his parents are killed, Zod manages to survive for one year until Jor-El and his older brother Zor-El save him. After reaching adulthood, Zod becomes one of Krypton's best soldiers, attaining the rank of general. Zod develops a hatred towards an alien species called the Char and secretly orders the creation of a Char-looking creature, unleashing it on Krypton's population, so he can justify a war against the Char. Jor-El discovers the deception and turns Zod over to the authorities. The council finds Zod guilty of treason and banishes him and his closest followers, Faora and Non, to the Phantom Zone.

Many years later, a mysterious event causes the Phantom Zone to weaken, allowing some of its prisoners to escape. Zod travels to Earth, landing in the Sahara desert. There, his Kryptonian powers manifest and he brutally kills a group of travelers. Zod is soon attacked by the Justice League of America until Superman and Wonder Woman arrive, the latter restraining him with her magic lasso. Zod recognizes Superman as Kal-El, the son of Jor-El. Superman decides to keep Zod in the Fortress of Solitude's alien zoo. While there, he reveals that Faora also traveled to Earth with him, and vows to track her down.

General Zod as depicted in Suicide Squad vol. 5 #17 (July 2017). Art by Tony S. Daniel and Sandu Florea.

==== DC Universe ====
In June 2016, the DC Rebirth event relaunched DC Comics' entire line of comic book titles, in which General Zod continues to appear within DC titles. In December 2017, DC Comics ended the Rebirth branding, opting to include everything under a larger DC Universe banner and naming. As part of the DC Rebirth relaunch, Zod is once again imprisoned within the Phantom Zone. He is trapped within the boundaries of the Black Vault, a secret facility hidden in the Laptev Sea. Amanda Waller sends the Suicide Squad to steal the contents of the Black Vault and bring them back to her, but they unwittingly allow Zod to escape. She attempts to recruit Zod by implanting a kryptonite explosive in his head, but he uses his heat vision to cut the bomb out of his skull, forcing Rick Flag to sacrifice himself to seal the Zone before Zod can release his army. Zod manages to retrieve his family from the Zone while fighting alongside the Superman Revenge Squad and escapes Earth to establish himself as a dictator on another planet with his family. He nearly kills Hal Jordan when the Green Lantern Corps discover his presence on the planet before both sides are forced to withdraw and recuperate.

== Powers and abilities ==
Like all Kryptonians under a yellow sun, General Zod possesses high-level superhuman strength, speed and endurance sufficient to stand against Superman and other Kryptonians; super hearing; x-ray vision; telescopic, microscopic and heat vision; super-breath and freeze-breath; virtual invulnerability; accelerated healing and flight. Due to his background as a Kryptonian general, Zod possesses a detailed knowledge of military tactics, battle strategy, and is a competent military leader. Having been trained in fighting arts, he typically has an edge over Superman's brawling skills, over-reliance on superhuman strength, and basic knowledge of advanced human and Kryptonian hand-to-hand combat. However, Zod's powers are often inferior to those of Superman, due to the latter being exposed to the yellow sun over the course of his entire life, while Zod typically only gets exposed for a short period of time before being defeated and returned to the Phantom Zone. This greater power combined with his superior control and experience with it gives Superman an edge over Zod's superior fighting skills. Like all Kryptonians, he is vulnerable to kryptonite and red solar radiation.

== Other versions ==
- The General Zod of Earth-15 is his world's Superman, who is later killed by Superman Prime.
- An alternate universe version of Zod appears in JSA: The Liberty Files. This version is a sociopathic child who was banished to the Phantom Zone for creating a deadly synthetic virus before being freed by American scientists, taken in by the government, and named Clark Kent.
- An alternate universe version of Zod appears in Superman: Earth One. This version is Zod-El, Jor-El's brother and Superman's uncle who worked with the Dheronians to destroy Krypton.

== In other media ==
=== Television ===
==== Animation ====
- A character based on Terence Stamp's portrayal of General Zod named Zi-Kree appears in the Super Friends episode "The Evil from Krypton". Similar to Zod, Zi-Kree is a Kryptonian criminal who was banished to the Phantom Zone.
- General Zod appears in the Superman (1988) episode "The Hunter", voiced by René Auberjonois.
- Zod was initially slated to appear in the Superman: The Animated Series. However, according to series director Dan Riba, these plans were scrapped due to rights issues and the character was replaced by Jax-Ur.
- General Zod makes a cameo appearance in the Legion of Super Heroes episode "Phantoms" as an inmate of the Phantom Zone.
- General Zod appears in Justice League Action, voiced by Jason J. Lewis.
- General Zod, based on Terence Stamp's portrayal, appears in the DC Super Hero Girls two-part episode "#DCSuperHeroBoys", voiced by Liam O'Brien. This version was imprisoned in the Phantom Zone by Alura Zor-El. Additionally, an alternate timeline version of Zod appears in the episode "#BackInAFlash".
- Dru-Zod appears in Young Justice, voiced by Phil Morris. This version is the husband of Ursa Zod and father of Lor-Zod who was paroled in the 31st century, but was re-imprisoned in the Phantom Zone by the Legion of Super-Heroes following a failed attempt to conquer the galaxy. In the 21st century, Dru manipulates the amnesiac Superboy into joining him before Lor travels back in time to free his family from the Phantom Zone. Dru leads his forces in an attempt to conquer Earth, only to be re-imprisoned by the Team.
- General Zod makes a cameo appearance in the Harley Quinn episode "The 83rd Annual Villy Awards".
- General Zod makes a cameo appearance in the Kite Man: Hell Yeah! episode "Grand Reopening, Hell Yeah!".

==== Live-action ====
Callum Blue as Major Zod in Smallville.

- A character based on General Zod named Lord Nor appears in the Lois & Clark: The New Adventures of Superman episode "Lord of the Flys", portrayed by Simon Templeman. He attempts to conquer Earth until he is betrayed by his cohorts and killed by Colonel Cash via a kryptonite warhead while fighting Superman.
- Zod appears in Smallville, portrayed primarily by Callum Blue while an uncredited Sam Witwer provides his initial appearance. This version is a Kandorian who was imprisoned in the Phantom Zone as well as husband of Faora and father of Doomsday. Brainiac releases Zod's disembodied wraith into possessing Lex Luthor in the fifth season before he's exorcised in the sixth season. After the eighth season where Tess Mercer uses a Kryptonian device called the "Orb", the ninth season reveals clones of several Kryptonians, including Zod, were created. After restoring his fellow clones' powers to gain their loyalty and killing Faora's traitorous clone, he begins plotting to fulfill the original Zod's destiny by conquering Earth. However, Clark Kent exposes the truth of Faora's death, turning the clones against him before sending them to an uninhabited planet where they can establish a colony. As of the tenth season episode "Dominion", the clones banished Zod's clone and his loyalists to the Phantom Zone, where he fused with the original Zod while maintaining both versions' memories. He lures Kent and Oliver Queen to the Phantom Zone, but the two escape and destroy the exit.
- A silver kryptonite-induced hallucination of General Zod appears in the Supergirl episode "Nevertheless, She Persisted", portrayed by Mark Gibbon.
- A time-traveling General Dru-Zod appears in Krypton, portrayed by Colin Salmon. Similarly to the Superman: Earth One incarnation, this version is the son of Lyta-Zod and Seg-El, half-brother of Jor-El, and uncle of Kal-El.
- Zod's consciousness appears in the Superman & Lois episode "Through the Valley of Death". Having been saved onto the Eradicator, Tal-Rho uses the device to infect Superman with Zod's consciousness before John Henry Irons motivates him to expel it.

=== Film ===
==== Original series (1978–2006) ====
- General Zod makes a cameo appearance in Superman (1978), portrayed by Terence Stamp. Alongside Ursa and Non, he is convicted of crimes against Kryptonian society and sentenced by Jor-El of the Science Council to life imprisonment in the Phantom Zone, shortly before Krypton's destruction.
- General Zod appears in Superman II, portrayed again by Stamp. Zod and his cohorts escape and reach Earth, where they gain powers, and form an alliance with Lex Luthor to defeat Superman and rule Earth, but they are eventually depowered and defeated by the hero.
- During early development for Superman Returns, Bryan Singer intended to include Zod, with Jude Law in the role. When Law declined, the character was omitted from the script. Zod was considered again, with Law wanted for the role once more, during early development for the sequel to Superman Returns, but the planned sequel never materialized past the development stage.

==== DC Extended Universe ====
General Zod appears in films set in the DC Extended Universe (DCEU), portrayed by Michael Shannon.

- Introduced in Man of Steel, this version is the Kandorian head of Krypton's Military Guild who initiated a rebellion and formed a battalion called the "Sword of Rao" after becoming dissatisfied with the Law Council's decisions, only to be apprehended and imprisoned in the Phantom Zone. In the present, following Krypton's destruction, the Sword of Rao escape and travel to Earth to find Superman and the Codex, a device containing the genetic code for all future Kryptonians, so Zod can xenoform Earth and repopulate the planet with genetically engineered Kryptonians. Ultimately, Superman and the United States military thwart Zod by sending his forces back to the Phantom Zone while Superman reluctantly kills Zod to save a family that he threatened to kill.
- Zod's corpse appears in Batman v Superman: Dawn of Justice. LexCorp takes possession of it, ostensibly to study Kryptonian anatomy and its origins, while Lex Luthor secretly combines the body with his blood and knowledge he stole from an ancient Kryptonian scout ship to create Doomsday.
- An alternate timeline version of Zod appears in The Flash. Due to the Flash creating the "Flashpoint" timeline, Zod and the Sword of Rao killed the infant Kal-El and seek out his cousin Kara Zor-El for the Codex.

==== Animation ====
- An alternate reality version of General Zod appears in flashbacks depicted in Justice League: Gods and Monsters, voiced by Bruce Thomas. This version caused Krypton's destruction while siphoning energy from its core to power his war machine and implanted his DNA into Lara Lor-Van's egg to ensure his legacy's survival, leading to the birth of his universe's Superman, Hernan Guerra.
- General Zod makes a cameo appearance in The Lego Batman Movie.
- General Zod appears in Scooby-Doo! and Krypto, Too!.

=== Video games ===
- General Zod, alongside Ursa and Non, appears as the collective final boss of Superman (1987).
- Zod appears in DC Universe Online, voiced by Alexander Brandon.
- General Zod, based on his post-Infinite Crisis design, appears in Lego Batman 2: DC Super Heroes, voiced by Townsend Coleman.
- General Zod appears as a downloadable playable character in Injustice: Gods Among Us, voiced by Nolan North. This version can create small portals to the Phantom Zone. Additionally, the DCEU incarnation of Zod appears as an alternate skin.
- General Zod appears as a character summon in Scribblenauts Unmasked: A DC Comics Adventure.
- The DCEU incarnation of General Zod appears as a playable character in Lego Batman 3: Beyond Gotham via DLC.
- General Zod appears as a boss in Lego Dimensions, voiced again by Nolan North.
- General Zod makes a cameo appearance in Sub-Zero's ending in Injustice 2.
- General Zod appears as a playable character in Lego DC Super-Villains.

=== Miscellaneous ===
- General Zod, also known as Commissioner Dru-Zod, appears in the novel The Last Days of Krypton, by Kevin J. Anderson. This version is the son of Cor-Zod, former head of the Kryptonian Council, and initially a mid-level bureaucrat before he takes advantage of a major planetary cataclysm and the apparent decapitation of the government to seize absolute power as a militaristic despot and use the Phantom Zone to imprison his political enemies until he is overthrown by a resistance movement led by Jor-El and Zor-El, and banished to the Phantom Zone along with his followers. Afterward, Dru's former prisoners, the planetary council, drop the Phantom Zone singularity into an active volcano to ensure he cannot escape, only to cause Krypton's core to implode and bring about the planet's destruction.
- While General Zod did not appear in series set in the DC Animated Universe due to copyright issues at the time, he appears in the tie-in comics Superman Adventures #21 and Justice League Unlimited #34. In the tie-in comic Justice League Beyond 2.0, Zod is revealed to be the son of Justice Lord Superman and Wonder Woman.
- The Injustice incarnation of General Zod appears in issue #39 of the Injustice 2 prequel comic. Amidst Batman's Insurgency's efforts to rescue the Teen Titans from the Phantom Zone, Zod takes advantage and escapes, killing Tim Drake in the process. An enraged Batman combats Zod before Ra's al Ghul sends Amazo to kill him.
- Zod appears as part of Lego's minifigure series based on the LEGO Batman Movie.

== Reception ==
Total Film ranked Zod #32 on their "Top 50 Greatest Villains of All Time" list in 2007. Pop-culture website IGN.com ranked General Zod as #30 on their list of the "Top 100 Comic Book Villains".

== See also ==
- List of Superman enemies
