= Phantom Zone =

Fictional dimension in the DC Universe

- Superman trapped in the Phantom Zone as seen on the cover of Superman (vol. 5) #2 (August 2018). Art by Ivan Reis.
- First appearance: Adventure Comics #283 (April 1961)
- Created by: Robert Bernstein (writer); George Papp (artist)

In-universe information
- Type: Prison; Dimension; Interdimensional realm
- Characters: General Zod; Ursa; Non; Jax-Ur; Faora; Quex-Ul
- Publisher: DC Comics

The Phantom Zone is a prison-like parallel dimension appearing in American comic books published by DC Comics. Created by the Kryptonians, it was designed as a place of exile for dangerous criminals; where time dilation behaves differently and the laws of physics don't apply. When someone is transported there, they do not age nor die, but they're trapped in a state of suspension. It is mainly associated with stories featuring Superman. It first appeared in Adventure Comics #283 (April 1961), and was created by Robert Bernstein and George Papp. It was frequently used in the Superman comics before the continuity was rebooted in the 1980s after Crisis on Infinite Earths and has appeared occasionally since.

== Fictional history ==
=== Pre-Crisis ===
The Phantom Zone was a "pocket universe" discovered by Jor-El that existed outside the space-time continuum; it was used on the planet Krypton as a humane method of imprisoning criminals. Kryptonians had abolished the death penalty in the distant past. In more recent history, criminals were punished by being sealed into capsules and rocketed into orbit in suspended animation with crystals attached to their foreheads to slowly erase their criminal tendencies; Klax-Ar was one criminal who received this punishment but escaped. Gra-Mo was the last to suffer the punishment, for it was then abolished in favor of the Zone. The inmates of the Phantom Zone reside in a ghost-like state of existence from which they can observe, but cannot interact with, the regular universe. Inmates do not age or require sustenance in the Phantom Zone; furthermore, they are telepathic and mutually insubstantial. As such, they were able to survive the destruction of Krypton and focus their attention on Earth, as most of the surviving Kryptonians now reside there. Most have a particular grudge against Superman because his father created the method of their damnation, and was often the prosecutor at their trials. When they manage to escape, they usually engage in random destruction, particularly easy for them since, on Earth, each acquires the same powers as Superman. Nevertheless, Superman periodically released Phantom Zone prisoners whose original sentences had been completed, and most of these went to live in the bottled city of Kandor.

In the Steve Gerber miniseries The Phantom Zone #1-4 (1982), it is revealed that the Zone has a breach through which other inmates had escaped, but they were never heard from again. The imprisoned Superman and Quex-Ul use this method and travel through several dimensional "layers" seeking the exit into the physical universe. They finally encounter a Kryptonian wizard named Thul-Kar, who tells them that he believed Jor-El's prophecy of Krypton's doom and entered the Phantom Zone through magic. Using the same breach, he discovered that the Phantom Zone was born from an entity called Aethyr.

=== Post-Crisis ===
Phantom Zone criminals pictured from left to right: Ursa, General Zod, and Non. Art by Gary Frank and Jonathan Sibal.

In the post-Crisis DC Universe, the Phantom Zone first appears after Superman returns from space with a Kryptonian artifact called the Eradicator. This device, created by his Kryptonian ancestor Kem-L, attempts to recreate Krypton on Earth, building the Fortress of Solitude; the extradimensional space in which the Eradicator finds the Kryptonian materials necessary is called the Phantom Zone. A Phantom Zone Projector is part of Superman's current Fortress. It has been used to access the bottled city of Kandor and to trap villains such as the White Martians.

The Phantom Zone has been independently discovered by various characters. It is called the "Buffer Zone" by the Bgztlians, the "Still Zone" by the White Martians, the "Stasis Zone" by Loophole, the "Ghost Zone" by Prometheus, and the "Honeycomb" by Queen Bee. In Post-Crisis/Post-Zero Hour continuity, it was Loophole's "Stasis Zone" technology that exiled Mon-El, known in the new continuity as Valor/M'Onel, into the Phantom Zone for 1,000 years.

Supergirl #16 shows a form of life native to the Phantom Zone. These Phantoms are enraged over the use of their universe to house criminals and seek revenge on the one responsible.

=== The New 52 ===
In The New 52, Jor-El suggested going into the Phantom Zone when Krypton was about to explode. Zod, however, appears with other Phantom Zone prisoners and attempts to escape the Phantom Zone. Krypto sacrifices himself by attacking Xa-Du, thus going into the Phantom Zone as well.

It is revealed that Xa-Du was the first Kryptonian prisoner to be sent to the Phantom Zone due to his forbidden experiments in suspended animation, with Jor-El executing the sentence. The Phantom Zone is reverted to the pre-Crisis iteration.

== Known inmates ==
=== Inmates in Pre-Crisis ===
Throughout the Silver Age of Comic Books, the following inhabitants of the Phantom Zone have been depicted. Based on this list, at least 34 Kryptonians were projected into the Phantom Zone on Krypton over a period of less than 256 Kryptonian days. The entry on the Kryptonian calendar shows the details on the relationship between Kryptonian sun-cycles and Earth years.

- Ak-Var – Ak-Var was sentenced to 30 Earth years (22 Kryptonian sun-cycles) (Note: 30 Kryptonian sun-cycles is impossible given Superman's time on Earth, thus 30 Earth years must be assumed to be correct; extrapolating from Quex-Ul's release date in Superman #157 (November 1962), a sentence of 19 Kryptonian sun-cycles (26 Earth years) would make more sense.) in the Phantom Zone for plotting to steal a revered relic called a Sun-Stone. After he serves his sentence, Ak-Var is released, moves to Kandor, and becomes the superhero Flamebird.
- Ar-Ual – Ar-Ual was sentenced to 50 Kryptonian sun-cycles (68.5 Earth years) in the Phantom Zone for destroying priceless knowledge and depriving Krypton of a millennium of scientific progress.
- Az-Rel – Az-Rel is a petty criminal from the island of Bokos who possesses pyrokinetic abilities. He and his partner Nadira work together to terrorize the Kryptonian city of Erkol before being captured and sentenced to 15 Kryptonian sun-cycles (20.55 Earth years) in the Phantom Zone. (Note: If 15 sun-cycles is correct, Az-Rel should have been released into Kandor long ago.) The two are among those freed from the Zone when Quex-Ul is manipulated into building a crude Phantom Zone Projector. Later, Nadira is killed when Jer-Em exposes her to green Kryptonite. She telekinetically inflicts pain on Az-Rel, which triggers his pyrokinesis, immolating him.
- Bal-Gra – The history and sentencing of this prisoner was not revealed. Bal-Gra once escaped from the Phantom Zone through a temporary space-warp. He battles Superman until he is depowered by gold Kryptonite and returned to the Phantom Zone.
- Blak-Du – The history and sentencing of this prisoner was not revealed. Blak-Du was Jor-El's roommate at Krypton College, and was rated as scientifically brilliant.
- Cha-Mel – A Kryptonian boy who was imprisoned in the Phantom Zone after impersonating Jor-El and attempting to rob his house.
- General Zod (Note: Full name given as "Dru-Zod" in World of Krypton #3 (September 1979)) – He was sentenced to 40 Kryptonian sun-cycles (54.8 Earth years) for using a duplicator ray to create a private army of imperfect clones to overthrow the government.
- Erndine Ze-Da (Zeda) (Note: Last name given as "Ze-Da" in Phantom Zone #1 (January 1982)) - The history and sentencing of this prisoner was not revealed. One day, a South Seas volcano exploded and the concussion opened a temporary gap in the Phantom Zone, enabling both Erndine Ze-Da and Dr. Xadu to escape. They concocted a plan to trap Superboy in the Zone, but he became aware of their scheme and stranded them on the planet Exon. Years later, Erndine and Xadu, who had since married and acquired the secret of the cosmic power-grip, escaped from Exon and returned to Earth. Superman defeated them again, and placed them in separate cells on two different worlds.
- Faora – A martial arts expert and hater of males, who was sentenced to 300 Kryptonian sun-cycles (411 Earth years) in the Phantom Zone for killing 23 men in a concentration camp. She once escaped captivity by using telepathy to manipulate an Earthman named Jackson Porter into freeing her from the Zone.
- Gann Artar – In one imaginary story, a criminal named Gann Artar was sentenced to 50 Kryptonian sun-cycles (68.5 Earth years) for using his de-evolutionary ray to create large, dangerous monsters.
- Gaz-Or (Note: Name given as "Gaz-Or" in Phantom Zone #1 (January 1982)) – After a lifetime of scientific villainy and because he was dying of old age, the Mighty Gazor attempted to use his earthquake machine to destroy Krypton. He was stopped by Jor-El, and was sentenced to the Phantom Zone.
- Gor-Nu – Once the greatest biochemist on Krypton, Gor-Nu's reckless experiments caused several deaths. He was sentenced to 50 Kryptonian sun-cycles (68.5 Earth years) in the Phantom Zone. When a lethal crystal-menace threatened to destroy the bottle-city of Kandor, Superman released Gor-Nu in the hope that he could figure out a way to stop it. Gor-Nu was successful, but then tried to betray Superman. Gor-Nu's plans were foiled and he was returned to the Phantom Zone.
- Gra-Mo and two assistants – The criminal Gra-Mo and his two assistants (one possibly named Ni-Van) (Note: The name "Ni-Van" was mentioned in World of Krypton #2 (August 1979)) were captured, sentenced to life for attempting to take over Krypton with Gra-Mo's robot hordes, placed in suspended animation, and imprisoned in a space capsule which was placed into orbit around Krypton. They were the last criminals to receive this type of punishment. After Krypton's destruction, the capsule drifted through space, and they eventually awakened and traveled to Earth. When Superboy learned of their criminal nature, he figured out a way to defeat them and projected them into the Phantom Zone.
- The Inventor – The history and sentencing of this human prisoner was not revealed.
- Jackson Porter – Phantom Zone prisoner Faora used telepathy to delude Jackson Porter into believing she was the ghost of his dead wife Katie. Faora soon manipulated him into freeing her from the Phantom Zone. After she is returned to the Phantom Zone, Porter follows her there.
- Jax-Ur – The first prisoner of the Phantom Zone, Jax-Ur is a rogue Kryptonian scientist who was sentenced to an eternity in the Phantom Zone after destroying Wegthor, an inhabited moon of Krypton, with an untested explosive.
- Jer-Em – A religious fanatic who was sentenced to 30 Kryptonian sun-cycles (41.1 Earth years) in the Phantom Zone for wiping out the superpowers of the people of Argo City (the birthplace of the future Supergirl) by guiding it back toward a red sun, leaving the residents stranded in their city in space. Jer-Em was among those freed from the Phantom Zone when Quex-Ul was manipulated into building and activating a crude Phantom Zone Projector. Later, Jer-Em purposely exposes himself to green Kryptonite to enter the Kryptonian afterlife.
- Kru-El – A weapons designer and cousin of Jor-El (Note: Revealed as Jor-El's cousin in Superboy Annual #1 (Summer 1964)) (the father of the future Superman). He was sentenced to 35 Kryptonian sun-cycles (47.95 Earth years) for developing an arsenal of super-powerful, forbidden weapons. (Note: Kru-El is erroneously depicted wearing Dr. Xadu's outfit in at least five appearances.)
- Kur-Dul – The history and sentencing of this prisoner was not revealed. Kur-Dul served his full sentence and was released by Superman and the Kandorian parole board.
- Lar Gand – A superpowered youth arrived on Earth with amnesia. He was found by Superboy, who suspected the youth may be his older brother. Superboy named him Mon-El, because they met on a Monday. When Mon-El was later exposed to lead, he collapsed in pain. His memory returned, and he explained that he is from the planet Daxam, whose natives have a lethal vulnerability to lead. To save Mon-El's life, Superboy projected him into the Phantom Zone. Mon-El spent 1,000 years in the Zone before he was released and cured by the Legion of Super-Heroes.
- Lar-On – A Kryptonian who was transformed into a werewolf-like creature and transported to the Phantom Zone until he could be cured.
- Lester Wallace – After being mentally manipulated by the Phantom Zone prisoner Zan-Em into developing a deep hatred of aliens and causing him to betray Superboy, Lester Wallace realized he had become the very thing he despised. He projected himself into the Phantom Zone as punishment.
- L. Finn – The history and sentencing of this leprechaun prisoner was not revealed.
- Lois Lane – Lois Lane time-traveled back to Krypton before it exploded and was accidentally trapped in the Phantom Zone by Jor-El when he was testing his new Projector device. She spent more than two and a half decades there before she was discovered and released by Superman.
- Marok – The history and sentencing of this prisoner was not revealed.
- Murkk – The history and sentencing of this prisoner was not revealed. Murkk was among a group of Phantom Zone prisoners who escaped by focusing their mental energies on a piece of Jewel Kryptonite. He was later disintegrated by the Vrangs.
- Nadira Va-Dim (Note: Last name given as "Va-Dim" in DC Comics Presents #97 (September 1986)) – Nadira was a petty criminal from Bokos, the Island of Thieves. She possessed psychokinetic powers. Her partner, Az-Rel, possessed pyrotic powers. Together they robbed helpless victims in Erkol, the oldest city of Krypton. Both were captured and sentenced to 15 Kryptonian sun-cycles (20.55 Earth years) in the Phantom Zone. The two criminals were among those freed from the Zone when Quex-Ul was manipulated into building and activating a crude Phantom Zone Projector. Later, Nadira was killed when the dying Jer-Em exposed her to green kryptonite.
- Nam-Ek – A scientist who was for killing Rondors to harness their healing horns and gain immortality. The serum he creates also transforms him into a humanoid Rondor. Superman would later send him into the Phantom Zone. (Note: DC Comics Presents #97 (September 1986) incorrectly states that Nam-Ek was projected into the Zone on Krypton for 15 sun-cycles.)
- Orn-Zu – Believing that Krypton's sun Rao would soon go nova, Orn-Zu created Jorlan, an android designed to hypnotically lure children away. He intended to use it to save his world's youth by kidnapping them and taking them away from Krypton. Orn-Zu was sentenced to an eternity in the Phantom Zone. When Jorlan arrived on Earth, it attempted to complete its mission. Orn-Zu convinced Superman to release him from the Zone, and they both confronted the android. Already dying from Pythagra Fever, Orn-Zu sacrificed himself to help stop his creation.
- Py-Ron (Evil-Man) – Py-Ron was sentenced to 50 Kryptonian sun-cycles (68.5 Earth years) in the Phantom Zone for using forbidden experiments to turn humans into bird-like monsters.
- Quex-Ul – Quex-Ul was sentenced to nearly 25 Earth years (18 Kryptonian sun-cycles) in the Phantom Zone for killing Rondors to procure their horns. He was the last prisoner projected into the Phantom Zone on Krypton. When he served his full sentence, Quex-Ul notified Superman and was released.
- Ral-En – A college friend and associate of Jor-El and son of psychologist Mag-En. With the help of his father, Ral-En used hyper-hypnotism to make everyone believe that he had gained superpowers, then attempted to become ruler of Krypton. Jor-El exposed his scheme, and Ral-En was sentenced to the Phantom Zone.
- Ran-Zo – The history and sentencing of this prisoner was not revealed.
- Ras-Krom – The history and sentencing of this prisoner was not revealed.
- Roz-Em – The criminal Roz-Em underwent plastic surgery to look exactly like Nim-El (Jor-El's twin brother). He attempted to steal a valuable weapon from the Armory of Forbidden Weapons, but was captured by Jor-El and the real Nim-El. He was placed in suspended animation, and imprisoned in a space capsule which was placed into orbit around Krypton. (Note: Phantom Zone #1 (Jan. 1982) incorrectly states that Roz-Em was projected into the Zone on Krypton.)
- Shyla Kor-Onn (Note: Last name given as "Kor-Onn" in Superman Family #188 (March 1978)) – Scientist Shyla Kor-Onn was sentenced to one Kryptonian sun-cycle (1.37 Earth years) for the crime of manslaughter. She was trapped in the Phantom Zone well past her punishment period due to Krypton's destruction. Shyla was freed in the bottle-city of Kandor, where she attempted to get her revenge on Supergirl.
- Tal-Var – Jimmy Olsen accidentally released Tal-Var from the Dark Dimension. He intended to loot and lay waste to the Earth, then to trap and kill Superman. Using his wits, Jimmy projected Tal-Var into the Phantom Zone before he could carry out his threats.
- Thul-Kar – The last of the Wizards of Juru, Thul-Kar used magic to teleport himself into the Phantom Zone on the day of Krypton's destruction. He was the first to discover the Phantom Zone's connections to Aethyr.
- Tor-An – Condemned to the Phantom Zone for carrying out forbidden experiments transferring the minds of a Kryptonian family into the bodies of monsters.
- Toymaster – The history and sentencing of this human prisoner was not revealed.
- Tra-Gob – The leader of a band of Kryptonian thieves which raided the priceless Science Archives. He was betrayed by his own men, but was rescued by Jor-El before they could exterminate him. Tra-Gob was sentenced to nearly 40 Earth years (29 Kryptonian sun-cycles) for his crime, but still remained deeply grateful to Jor-El. Tra-Gob was in the Phantom Zone for nearly 30 Earth years before he escaped due to a freak disruption by the aurora borealis. He rescued Superman and Lois Lane from a Kryptonian monster, repaying his debt to Jor-El. As Tra-Gob was being returned to the Zone to finish out his sentence, Superman commented that he may be pardoned for his good behavior.
- Tyb-Ol – The history and sentencing of this prisoner was not revealed. Tyb-Ol was among a group of Phantom Zone prisoners who escaped by focusing their mental energies on a pierce of jewel kryptonite. He was later disintegrated by the Vrangs.
- Professor Va-Kox (Professor Vakox) (Note: Name given as "Va-Kox" in Phantom Zone #1 (January 1982); incorrectly called Varox in Superman's Pal Jimmy Olsen #101 (April 1967).) – Va-Kox is a mad geneticist who was sentenced to 50 Kryptonian sun-cycles (68.5 Earth years) for tossing a test tube full of his life force experiment into the Great Krypton Lake, creating a huge mutated monster.
- Vax-Nor – The history and sentencing of this prisoner was not revealed. Vax-Nor served his full sentence and was released by Superman and the Kandorian parole board.
- Vorb-Un – Vorb-Un was sentenced to 10 Kryptonian sun-cycles (13.7 Earth years) in the Phantom Zone for experimenting with forbidden elements without the Science Council's permission. During a parole hearing in Kandor, Vorb-Un explained to Superman and the parole board that his sentence was almost up, and he insisted that he had repented. Due to his advanced age and his sincere remorse, he was released from his prison.
- Vor-Kil – The crime and sentencing of this prisoner was not revealed. Vor-Kil escaped from the Phantom Zone when sunspot activity opened a temporary gap to Earth. He battled Superman using the Kryptonian martial art of Klurkor. Superman lured him back into captivity with the help of Jimmy Olsen.
- Dr. Xadu – Xadu was sentenced to 30 Kryptonian sun-cycles (41.1 Earth years) for breaking the law which forbids the use of suspended animation in any scientific research. He escaped the Phantom Zone with a prisoner named Erndine Ze-Da when a South Seas volcano exploded and opened a temporary gap in the Phantom Zone. They concocted a plan to trap Superboy in the Zone, but he became aware of their scheme and stranded them on the planet Exon. Xadu and Erndine, who had since married and acquired the secret of the cosmic power-grip, escaped from Exon and returned to Earth. Superman defeated them again, and placed them in separate cells on two different worlds. Inexplicably, Xadu appeared in the Phantom Zone in many stories set between these two tales. (Note: Dr. Xadu is explicitly named in Superman #150 (January 1962) and Superman's Pal Jimmy Olsen #62 (July 1962), and is depicted in four additional stories. This contradiction is never addressed.)
- Zan-Ar – The crime and sentencing of this prisoner was not revealed.
- Zan-Em – A psychic scientist who was banished to the Phantom Zone for unauthorized mind control experiments.
- Zo-Mar – The criminal Zo-Mar was captured, sentenced to life for attempting to enslave all of Krypton, placed in suspended animation, and imprisoned in a space capsule which was placed into orbit around Krypton. After Krypton's destruction, the capsule drifted through space, and Zo-Mar eventually awakened and traveled to Earth. With the help of the Challengers of the Unknown, Superman captured Zo-Mar and projected him into the Phantom Zone.
- Unnamed Kandorian scientist – A scientist in Kandor was sentenced to 20 Kryptonian sun-cycles (27.4 Earth years) for performing experiments with the Z-Bomb, even though he was warned that it could accidentally blow up the bottle-city.
- Unnamed energy creature – An alien whose race evolved into pure energy followed an Earth probe back to Earth. The entity was able to possess and control other physical objects and beings, and used this ability to wreak havoc. Superman and Lois Lane tricked the creature into a Superman puppet, then projected it into the Phantom Zone.
- Two unnamed members of the Superman Revenge Squad – Two members of the Superman Revenge Squad attempted to enslave the people of New Krypton, but Superman foiled their plans by projecting them into the Phantom Zone.

=== Inmates in Post-Crisis ===
The following were imprisoned in the Phantom Zone:

- Az-Rel and Nadira Va-Dim – Az-Rel and his lover Nadira Va-Dim are Kryptonians who Ursa enlisted as sleeper agents.
- Car-Vex – A Kryptonian criminal who was banished to the Phantom Zone. General Zod recruited her to be a sleeper agent on Earth.
- Dev-Em – A Kryptonian who was arrested and imprisoned in the Phantom Zone for murder and perversion.
- Doomsday – Due to his adaptive powers, Doomsday evolved in a way where his fists tore through the Phantom Zone, allowing him to escape it.
- Faora
- General Zod – A Kryptonian military general who was exiled to the Phantom Zone after trying to overthrow the Kryptonian Council so he could take over Krypton.
- Jax-Ur
- Non – A former friend and scientific colleague of Jor-El. After leading a separatist movement that planned to tell all of Krypton on what will happen to their planet, he is abducted and lobotomized by Krypton's Science Council. This leaves him a minimally-verbal and highly-aggressive brute. Some aspects of his personality survive and surface as an extreme kindness when dealing with children. Serving as General Zod's enforcer, he also becomes guardian and caregiver for Zod's son Lor-Zod.
- Prometheus
- Quex-Ul – A Kryptonian criminal who was banished to the Phantom Zone and was later recruited by General Zod to be a sleeper agent on Earth.
- Tor-An – A Kryptonian who allied with General Zod and was imprisoned in the Phantom Zone. When Ursa was charged with assigning five Kryptonians as sleeper agents on Earth, Tor-An assumed the identity of a human entrepreneur named David Carter and became the CEO of the Empire Communications Network. Tor-An was later killed by Ursa.
- Ursa – Ursa is the lover of General Zod and mother of Chris Kent. After Non is lobotomized by the Science Council, she instigated open rebellion along with Zod. As a result, the three were exiled to the Phantom Zone.
- Val-Ty – A Kryptonian sociopath who once fought Tomar-Re whom he eluded by destroying Xan City. He was later captured and placed in the Phantom Zone. When Zod's blanket amnesty was issued, he and the other Phantom Zone criminals were released. Unlike the group who went with Ursa, Val stayed on New Krypton, going rogue. He was the target of a manhunt by the Military Guild, and was eventually captured by Kal-El's Red Shard for which he has vowed revenge.
- White Martians –
- Superman foes such as Bizarro, Parasite, Prankster, Silver Banshee, and Toyman were thrown into the Phantom Zone by the Kandorians and were later freed by Superman.

=== Inmates in All-Star Superman ===
- Bar-El and Lilo – Kryptonian astronauts who survived the destruction of Krypton. They were placed in the Phantom Zone until Superman can find a cure for their kryptonite poisoning.

=== Inmates in The New 52/DC Rebirth ===
- Cyborg Superman
- General Zod
- Hades
- Jax-Ur
- Lar-On – A Kryptonian who was banished to the Phantom Zone after red kryptonite turned him into a werewolf-like creature.
- Lor-Zod
- Mongul
- Non
- Nuclear Man - An inmate of the Phantom Zone.
- Ras-Krom
- Ursa
- Vak-Ox
- Xa-Du – Also known as the "Phantom King", Xa-Du was a Kryptonian researcher, interested in improving research into suspended animation. However, the unethical nature of his studies led to the Kryptonian Science Council suspending his research and choosing him as the first inmate of the Phantom Zone. A sociopath, Xa-Du swore revenge on the family of the Phantom Zone's discoverer, Jor-El and his son, forming the "Anti-Superman Army".

== Other versions ==
In the Elseworlds tale Superman & Batman: Generations, Superman is sentenced to the Phantom Zone in 1989 when he is stripped of his powers in a confrontation with the Ultra-Humanite that ends with his foe's death, after the Ultra-Humanite's actions led to the death of Superman's wife Lois Lane and his son Joel being tricked into killing Superman's daughter Kara before Joel dies himself, as well as arranging various 'accidents' for Clark Kent's other remaining loved ones. The judges reason that even if Superman feels that he may have killed his foe deliberately after the deaths of his family and friends, putting him in a conventional prison without his powers would be dangerous and solitary confinement was too extreme given his past deeds, selecting the Zone based on the suggestion of the new Batman, Bruce Wayne Jr. Superman is released in 1999 by the now-rejuvenated Bruce Wayne as Bruce returns to the role of Batman. Bruce noting that he is ending the sentence a few months early, but is certain that nobody would object to early release "for good behavior".

== In other media ==
=== Television ===
- The Phantom Zone appears in the Super Friends franchise. This version is described as a fifth dimension that is parallel to the main universe. The Phantom Zone makes anyone within it appear monochrome and nullifies technology and superhuman abilities.
- The Phantom Zone appears in the Superman episode "The Hunter".
- Several analogues of the Phantom Zone appear in Lois & Clark: The New Adventures of Superman. In the fourth season, an Utopian from the future Andrus creates a "time tablet" to trap the fugitive Tempus in a space-time cube. The episode "Battleground Earth" features a Kryptonian capital punishment that scatters a criminal's body across the universe.
- The Phantom Zone appears in Superman: The Animated Series. In the pilot episode "The Last Son of Krypton", Jor-El proposes transporting the Kryptonians into the Phantom Zone to survive Krypton's destruction. However, the Kryptonian Science Council does not accept this plan, forcing Jor-El to send his son Kal-El to Earth along with the Phantom Zone Projector. In the episode "Blasts from the Past", Superman frees Mala from the Phantom Zone after learning that she has completed her sentence. However, she had plans to free Jax-Ur from the Phantom Zone. Superman is forced to send her and Jax-Ur back after they attempt to conquer Earth.
- The Phantom Zone appears in the Justice League Unlimited episode "The Doomsday Sanction". Unable to get any information about Project Cadmus from Doomsday, Superman is forced to send him to the Phantom Zone.
- The Phantom Zone appears in the Legion of Super Heroes episode "Phantoms".
- The Phantom Zone appears in Smallville. This version is a desert-like wasteland with a blue sun that never sets and negates Kryptonian powers. Some inmates were stripped of their bodies and become wraiths that dwell the Phantom Zone. Known inmates are General Zod, Faora, Aethyr, Nam-Ek, the plant-manipulating Gloria, Raya, the wraith Baern, Aldar, an unnamed wraith who posed as Dr. Hudson, Titan, a wraith that became Bizarro, Slade Wilson, and Kamira.
- The Phantom Zone appears in Supergirl. This version is a region of space where time does not pass and is home to the maximum security prison Fort Rozz. Known inmates include Astra In-Ze, Caren Falqnerr, the Commander, Dr. Alphonse Luzano, Gabriel Phillips, Gor, a Hellgrammite, Indigo, Jemm, K'hund, Kerfuffle, Moyer, Mur, Non, Tor, and Vartox. Following "Crisis on Infinite Earths", the Phantom Zone is broken up like an archipelago and infested with Zulian Maletarians (also known as Phantoms).
- The Phantom Zone appears in Justice League Action, with known inmates including General Zod, Faora, and Quex-Ul.
- The Phantom Zone appears in Krypton, with known inmates including Seg-El and Brainiac.
- The Phantom Zone appears in Harley Quinn.
- The Phantom Zone appears in the fourth season of Young Justice. Known inmates include General Zod, Ursa, Faora, Non, Jax-Ur, Vor-Kil, and Kru-El.
- Guy Gardner name-drops the Phantom Zone in the Lanterns episode, "Bad Optics".

=== Film ===
- The Empty Doom, a dimension resembling the Phantom Zone and predating its appearance in the comics, appears in Atom Man vs. Superman.
- Richard Donner's Superman film and its sequel depict the Zone as a folded region of space that appears from outside as a tumbling two-dimensional plane. General Zod, Ursa and Non are imprisoned in it until a nuclear explosion releases them.
- The Phantom Zone appears in Supergirl, where Supergirl is sent there by Selena.
- The Phantom Zone appears in Superman: Brainiac Attacks.
- The Phantom Zone appears in All-Star Superman.
- The Phantom Zone appears in Man of Steel, with known inmates including General Zod, Faora, Car-Vex, Dev-Em, Jax-Ur, Nadira, Nam-Ek, and Tor-An.
- The Phantom Zone appears in The Lego Batman Movie. This version is guarded by Phyllis, who resembles a generic Lego brick.
- The Phantom Zone appears in Teen Titans Go! & DC Super Hero Girls: Mayhem in the Multiverse.

=== Video games ===
- The Phantom Zone appears in Mortal Kombat vs. DC Universe.
- The Phantom Zone appears in DC Universe Online.
- The Phantom Zone appears in Injustice: Gods Among Us, resembling its portrayal in Superman: The Movie and Superman II.
- The Phantom Zone appears in Scribblenauts Unmasked: A DC Comics Adventure.
- The Phantom Zone appears in Lego Dimensions.
- The Phantom Zone appears in Injustice 2.

=== Miscellaneous ===
- The Phantom Zone appears in Kevin J. Anderson's novel The Last Days of Krypton.
- A Lego set released in 2017, titled "Batman in the Phantom Zone" features a Batman minifigure and a machine.

=== Parodies and homages ===
- The Phantom Zone appears in The Simpsons: Bartman Meets Radioactive Man.
- The Phantom Zone appears in the Family Guy episode, "Lethal Weapons."
- The Phantom Zone appears in the Robot Chicken episode "Suck It".
- The Phantom Zone appears in the South Park episode "Krazy Kripples".
- The Phantom Zone appears in Plants vs. Zombies 2
- The Phantom Zone appears in the American Dad! episode "The Most Adequate Christmas Ever".
- The Null Void, a dimension akin to the Phantom Zone, appears in the Ben 10 franchise. It is primarily used as an inter-dimensional prison for containing alien criminals. The Void is accessible via a Null Void Generator, a device similar in design and application to the Phantom Zone Projector.
- Lord Buckethead's manifesto in the 2017 United Kingdom general election included a promise to exile Katie Hopkins to the Phantom Zone.
