= George Papp =

American comics artist (1916–1989)

- Born: George Edward Papp; January 20, 1916
- Died: August 8, 1989 (aged 73) Oradell, New Jersey, U.S.
- Areas: Penciller, Artist, Inker
- Notable works: Superboy; Green Arrow; Congo Bill

George Edward Papp (January 20, 1916 – August 8, 1989) was an American comics artist best known as one of the principal artists on the long-running DC Comics series Superboy. Papp also co-created Green Arrow with Mort Weisinger and Congo Bill with writer Whitney Ellsworth.

== Career ==
George Papp began his comic book career with the occasional feature and cartoon in early issues of the Superman line of comics. "Pep Morgan" and "Clip Carson" were the first features he worked on for Action Comics. Papp primarily worked for DC Comics, but briefly worked for Columbia Comics and Harvey Comics as well. At DC, Papp co-created Green Arrow and Congo Bill. Papp joined the U.S. Army during World War II before returning to comics. From 1946 to 1968, Papp worked on the Green Arrow and Superboy comics features, during which he co-created Bizarro, General Zod, and the Phantom Zone, among others. His other work includes several early appearances of the Legion of Super-Heroes. Papp was fired by DC in 1968 along with many other prominent writers and artists who had made demands for health and retirement benefits. His final published comic was Superboy #148 (June 1968). Afterwards, Papp worked in commercial art and advertising.

== Bibliography ==
=== Columbia Comics ===
- Big Shot Comics #5–6 (1940)

=== DC Comics ===
- Action Comics #5, 7–11, 14, 16–18, 20, 22, 28–41 (1938–1941)
- Adventure Comics #34 ("Fantastic Facts" feature); #104–205, 207–249 ("Green Arrow" feature); #251, 254–255, 258–259, 261–262, 264–267, 269–270, 272–275, 277, 282–283, 287–290, 295, 297, 299–300, 303–310, 312–315 ("Superboy" feature); #320, 348, 358 ("Legion of Super-Heroes" feature) (1939–1967)
- All-American Men of War #11, 13–14, 22, 26, 28 (1954–1955)
- Batman #1–3, 16 ("Fantastic Facts" feature) (1940–1943)
- The Brave and the Bold #71 (Batman and Green Arrow) (1967)
- Congo Bill #4 (1955)
- Detective Comics #35, 37 ("Fantastic Facts" feature); #71 (1940–1943)
- Gang Busters #2–4, 7–8, 40, 61 (1948–1958)
- House of Mystery #26, 56, 61, 68, 70, 73 (1954–1958)
- House of Secrets #6, 8, 10 (1957–1958)
- Leading Comics #1–3, 5 (1941–1943)
- More Fun Comics #38; #52, 54–55 ("Fantastic Facts" feature); #56–67 ("Congo Bill" feature); #68–76 ("Clip Carson" feature); #73–84 ("Green Arrow" feature) (1938–1942)
- Mr. District Attorney #4, 57–58 (1948–1957)
- My Greatest Adventure #21 (1958)
- New York World's Fair Comics #2 ("Fantastic Facts" feature) (1940)
- Our Army at War #25–26, 31, 36, 44, 48 (1954–1956)
- Our Fighting Forces #1, 3, 6–7, 10–11 (1954–1956)
- Real Fact Comics #6, 8 (1947)
- Star Spangled Comics #91–105, 118 ("Captain Compass" feature) (1949–1951)
- Star Spangled War Stories #23, 30, 32 (1954–1955)
- Superboy #65–73, 75–79, 81, 83–97, 99–102, 104–128, 130–137, 139–142, 144–145, 148 (1958–1968)
- Superman #130, 152, 177 (1959–1965)
- Superman's Pal Jimmy Olsen #79–80, 82, 84, 86, 88, 90, 94 (1964–1966)
- Tales of the Unexpected #6, 9, 13–14, 27 (1956–1958)
- Tomahawk #48 (1957)
- World's Finest Comics #23, 25–95 ("Green Arrow" feature) (1946–1958)

=== Harvey Comics ===
- Champion Comics #2, 5 (1939–1940)
- Cyclone Comics #1, 3 (1940)

Preceded by n/a	"Green Arrow" feature in Adventure Comics artist 1946–1958	Succeeded by Jack Kirby
Preceded by n/a	"Green Arrow" feature in World's Finest Comics artist 1946–1958	Succeeded by Jack Kirby
Preceded by John Sikela	Superboy artist 1958–1968	Succeeded by Al Plastino
Preceded by John Sikela	"Superboy" feature in Adventure Comics artist 1958–1963	Succeeded by n/a
