= Kryptonian =

Fictional race native to the planet Krypton

- Flag of Krypton

Publication information
- Publisher: DC Comics
- First appearance: Action Comics #1 (June 1938)
- Created by: Jerry Siegel and Joe Shuster

Characteristics
- Place of origin: Krypton
- Notable members: Superman (Kal-El); Supergirl (Kara Zor-El); Krypto; Jor-El; Lara; Zor-El; Alura; General Zod; Ursa; Non; Jax-Ur; Faora; Quex-Ul
- Inherent abilities: None; Under yellow sun: Superhuman strength, stamina, endurance, speed, agility, reflexes, intelligence, longevity, and hearing; Solar radiation absorption and projection; Enhanced vision; EM spectrum vision; Microscopic vision; X-ray vision; Telescopic vision; Infra-red vision; Invulnerability; Ice and wind breath; Flight; Heat vision

Kryptonians are a fictional extraterrestrial race within the DC Comics universe that originated on the planet Krypton. The term originated from the stories of DC Comics superhero, Superman. The stories also use "Kryptonian" as an adjective to refer to anything created by or associated with the planet itself or the cultures that existed on it.

Kryptonians are indistinguishable from humans in terms of their appearance, but in terms of their physiology and genetics they are vastly different. In some continuities, Kryptonians are difficult to clone because their DNA is so complex that human science is not advanced enough to decipher it. The cellular structure of Kryptonians allows for solar energy to be absorbed at extremely high levels. On the planet Krypton, which orbited a red star, their natural abilities were the same as humans. When exposed to a young yellow star like Earth's Sun, which is smaller than their own sun and has a vastly higher energy output, their bodies are able to absorb and process so much energy that it manifests as vast superhuman powers (such as superhuman strength, superhuman speed, invulnerability, flight, x-ray vision, heat vision and superhuman senses).

Almost all Kryptonians were killed when the planet exploded shortly after the infant Kal-El was sent to Earth. In some continuities, he is the planet's only survivor. In other canons, there is a last daughter of Krypton Kara Zor-El, cousin of Superman and known as Supergirl. Krypto was the family dog in Jor-El's home and was used for a test flight of the rocket that ultimately brought baby Kal-El to Earth. These three were the surviving Kryptonians, who became Earth's greatest heroes.

== Physiology and powers ==
Kal-El can lead an alter ego as Clark Kent because Kryptonians appear identical to humans. Also, in both Silver Age and Modern Age continuity, Kryptonians have more than one ethnic group, such as dark-skinned Kryptonians from Krypton's Vathlo Island that resemble Earth humans of West African, Negrito, Melanesian, and Indigenous Australian descent and a group from the continent of Twenx that resemble Earth humans of North African, Middle Eastern, Asian, Micronesian, Polynesian, Native American, and Latino descent. This is all due to convergent evolution. In the first stories about Superman's origins, all Kryptonians possess on their homeworld the same powers Superman has on Earth. In later depictions, their abilities are attributed to the differences between Earth's gravity and that of Krypton and the different radiation of the stars they orbit. Kryptonians use solar energy from yellow, blue, orange or white stars on the cellular and molecular levels to gain superhuman abilities. The light of dwarf stars, pulsars, and quasars also grants Kryptonians different abilities. Some stories also maintain that Kryptonians have bioelectric fields that surround their bodies and protect them from harm and which are the means by which Kryptonians fly. Certain individuals (including Conner Kent, Chris Kent, and some Phantom Zone criminals) possess "tactile telekinesis", which allows Kryptonians to lift and manipulate large objects whose own structural strength might not otherwise survive the process. The abilities of Kryptonians evolve and grow more powerful as Kryptonians age and develop.

In some continuities, mating between Kryptonians and other species is difficult because Kryptonian DNA is so complex as to be nearly incompatible with that of other species. The only notable exception is represented by the original native Daxamite population (the race that bore that name before intermingling with the Kryptonian explorers, who later adapted the name for themselves). Breeding between Kryptonian explorers and this race created a new Kryptonian hybrid race that could interbreed with a larger number of humanoid races—including Earth humans. No other races are yet known to exhibit the same degree of compatibility of the native Daxamites. However, in some continuations humans are not only able to reproduce with Kryptonians, but are able to create fertile offspring with them.

Superpowered Kryptonians are vulnerable to kryptonite, radioactive remnants of Krypton, magic and solar radiation from red and orange suns. They are also vulnerable to physical attacks from beings native to Krypton essentially in proportion to their vulnerability in non-powered situations. In addition Kryptonian beings are vulnerable to infection from viruses or bacteria native to Krypton.

== Culture and technology ==
Kryptonians are a highly culturally and technologically advanced people. Self-grown crystals, both natural and synthetic, which covered the vast majority of their planet's surface gave their homeworld a bluish hue when viewed from space and underlay Kryptonian technology. Relatively small crystals can hold vast amounts of information. The Fortress of Solitude is often portrayed as a recreation of Krypton's surface and a storehouse of Kryptonian knowledge.

A pictographic crest or symbol represents each Kryptonian family, or House; the head of the House usually wears it. According to the Superman movie and sequels, a shape similar to the Latin letter "S" represents the House of El, for example. Superman wears this same symbol on his costume, which therefore serves a dual purpose: it displays his Kryptonian heritage, as well as functioning as the "S" for Superman. Male Kryptonians are identified by hyphenated names which identify both them and their houses, such as Jor-El and Kal-El of the House of El. Female Kryptonians have one given name but take their father's name as their last name. For example, Kal-El's mother is named Lara Lor-Van, taken from her father's name (Lor-Van).

The different Houses were also broken up into a loosely-based caste system as well. The Religious, Artist, Military and Science castes had representation on the ruling council, while the Worker caste did not. The different castes lived in buildings with different architectural styles that represented various styles throughout Krypton's history.

The severe xenophobia of Kryptonian society conveniently explains Kal-El's being the first Kryptonian to leave the planet. Non-superpowered Kryptonians are genetically dependent to their home planet; as such, Kal-El was sent to Earth as a newly conceived embryo within a birthing matrix in order to survive in Earth's atmosphere. He was also devoid of any Kryptonian minerals, because they would turn to kryptonite upon leaving Krypton's atmosphere. Kryptonians are evolutionarily related to the also-severely xenophobic Daxamites. The Daxamites remain that way up through the 31st century.

Kryptonian law did not believe in capital punishment. Instead, the worst criminals were sent to the Phantom Zone, despite a lack of understanding of the nature of the zone, its danger to the imprisoned and the presence of exits.

Krypton's red sun was named Rao. It was worshiped by the Kryptonians as a deity (albeit in a more scientific and rational way as the giver and sustainer of all life on the planet). Other deities include Nightwing and Flamebird, dragon-like deities who have inspired a number of superhero teams as well as notable dynasties of Krypton e.g., the House of El.

Just like humans domesticating their animals on Earth, Kryptonians also domesticate their own animals as well; which some of them look very similar to Earth's animals, due to parallel evolution, e.g., birds, felids, canids, simians, etc., as seen in Krypto and Beppo; while others look very different, due to divergent evolution, e.g., fish/snake/eel-like hybrid creatures called "fish-snakes", goat-like creatures called "Zuurt", bovine-like creatures called "Rondor", rhinoceros/ceratopsian-like hybrid creatures called "Thought-Beasts", dragon-like creatures called "H'Raka", and pterodactyl-like creatures called "War-Kites".

== Language and alphabet ==
For most of Superman's published history, Kryptonian writing was represented by random, alien-looking squiggles. In the 1970s, E. Nelson Bridwell attempted to rationalize the squiggles into a 118-letter alphabet called Kryptonese. This standardized alphabet was then used by DC Comics until John Byrne's 1986 "reboot" of the Superman universe.

In 2000, DC introduced a transliteration alphabet for the written language, which was renamed Kryptonian.

== Calendar ==
In the 1970s and 1980s, details about the Kryptonian calendar as it existed in the Earth-One universe were revealed. The Kryptonian time units were defined as follows:

- 100 thribo (Kryptonian seconds) per dendar (Kryptonian minute).
- 100 dendaro (Kryptonian minutes) per wolu (Kryptonian hour).
- 10 woluo (Kryptonian hours) per zetyar (Kryptonian day).
- six zetyaro (Kryptonian days) per fanff (Kryptonian week).
- 73 zetyaro (Kryptonian days) per lorax (Kryptonian month).
- 438 zetyaro (Kryptonian days) per amzet (Kryptonian year).
- 73 fanffo (Kryptonian weeks) per amzet (Kryptonian year).
- six loraxo (Kryptonian months) per amzet (Kryptonian year).
- The six loraxo (months) were: Belyuth, Ogtal, Ullhah, Eorx, Hefralt and Norzec.

In the Kryptonian language, the suffix "o" indicates the plural form of a noun.

According to one story, in which Quex-Ul had served his full sentence, 18 Kryptonian sun-cycles (amzeto) is about 25 Earth years. It can be demonstrated that one Kryptonian sun-cycle is 1.37 Earth years, as follows:

- Superman was born on 35 Eorx 9998, which occurred on February 29 in the Earth calendar.
- Krypton exploded early on 39 Ogtal 10000, which occurred on June 16 in the Earth calendar (Superman arrived on Earth two days later, on June 18).
- Therefore, there were 734 Kryptonian days (1.676 Kryptonian years) between the two events.
- Since 18 Kryptonian years is about 25 Earth years, then there were approximately 2.3 Earth years between the two events.
- The exact number of days between February 29, and June 16 two years later, is 838 (or 2.294 years).
- Thus, 1.676 Kryptonian years equals 2.294 Earth years, or 1 Kryptonian year equals roughly 1.37 Earth years.

Using this ratio of 1.37 Earth years per Kryptonian year (amzet), and ignoring any potential Kryptonian leap day and any differences in time of day, one can approximate other units of time:

- 1.37 years per amzet
- 0.99 seconds per thrib (31,556,952 seconds/year * 1.37 years/amzet * one amzet/43,800,000 thrib)
- 1.65 minutes per dendar (525949.2 minutes/year * 1.37 years/amzet * one amzet/438,000 dendar)
- 2.74 hours per wolu (8765.82 hours/year * 1.37 years/amzet * one amzet/4,380 wolu)
- 1.14 days per zetyar (365.2425 days/year * 1.37 years/amzet * one amzet/438 zetyar)

Major events in the Kryptonian calendar include:

- Jor-El and Lara were married on 47 Ullhah 9997.
- The city of Kandor was stolen by Brainiac on 33 Ogtal 9998.
- Kal-El (Superman) was born to Jor-El and Lara on 35 Eorx 9998.
- The Phantom Zone became an official method of punishment, and Jax-Ur became its first prisoner, on 67 Eorx 9999.
- Kal-El's pet dog, Krypto, was lost in space on 54 Belyuth 10000.
- Jor-El launched the Phantom Zone projector into space on 30 Ogtal 10000.
- Lar Gand landed on Krypton and met Jor-El on 34 Ogtal 10000.
- Kal-El was sent in an interstellar rocketship towards Earth and Krypton exploded on 39 Ogtal 10000.

== Survivors ==
Superman, Supergirl, Krypto, Beppo, Dev-Em, and the Eradicator survived Krypton's destruction by being sent off-world shortly beforehand. General Zod and Ursa, among others, survived by being in the Phantom Zone. The city of Kandor was also spared from destruction, as it was shrunken and collected by Brainiac. The people of Argo City also survive Krypton's destruction due to an energy field surrounding it, although in most universes they either die soon afterward or are captured by Brainiac.
