= List of Superman: The Animated Series episodes =

Superman: The Animated Series is an American television series based on the DC Comics superhero Superman, which was produced by Warner Bros. Animation and originally aired on The WB from 1996 to 2000; lasting 54 episodes.

The series is part of what has become known as the DC Animated Universe and was the first after the acclaimed Batman: The Animated Series.

== Series overview ==
Season	Episodes	Originally released	
Season	Episodes	First released	Last released
1	13	September 6, 1996	February 15, 1997
2	28	September 8, 1997	May 2, 1998
3	10	September 19, 1998	May 15, 1999
4	3	September 18, 1999	February 12, 2000

== Episodes ==
=== Season 1 (1996–1997) ===
All episodes of season one except the first five and last two were shown out of production order when originally aired.

No. overall	No. in season	Title	Directed by	Written by	Original release date
1	1	"The Last Son of Krypton"	Dan Riba	Alan Burnett & Paul Dini	September 6, 1996
2	2	"The Last Son of Krypton"	Scott Jeralds & Curt Geda	Alan Burnett & Paul Dini	September 6, 1996
3	3	"The Last Son of Krypton"	Bruce Timm & Dan Riba	Alan Burnett & Paul Dini	September 6, 1996
Part 1: Kryptonian scientist Jor-El discovers that the planet Krypton is on the verge of destruction. However, the planet's supercomputer Brainiac denies this is the case to the planet's council and brands him a criminal, as it makes plans to escape after collecting all of Krypton's data. With no choice, Jor-El and his wife Lara prepare to send their only son, Kal-El, to a distant world, before Krypton's destruction. Part 2: Kal-El's spaceship crash-lands on Earth following its interstellar journey, where he is found and adopted by Jonathan and Martha Kent, who name him Clark. A teenage Clark, living in Smallville, Kansas, soon discovers he has superpowers, which he uses to save the lives of a family in a car accident, and soon the Kents tell him the truth of his origins. Part 3: A few years later, Clark Kent lives in Metropolis as a reporter for the Daily Planet, while using his superpowers for good as the hero Superman. While Clark finds himself drawn close to his fellow colleague Lois Lane as Superman, he also deals with escaped terrorist John Corben, who wreaks havoc with a robot suit stolen from billionaire Lex Luthor. Meanwhile, an alien ship comes across the satellite that Brainiac escaped on, and he kills its crew to build a new body. Note: Tony Jay voiced Sul-Van, Superman's grandfather, in the first part, having previously appeared in ABC Television Network's Lois & Clark: The New Adventures of Superman.
4	4	"Fun and Games"	Kazuhide Tomonaga	Robert N. Skir & Marty Isenberg	September 7, 1996
Gangster Bruno Mannheim is running into problems with the mysterious Toyman, who uses children's toys and games to cause violence. After being abducted by Toyman, Lois learns his motivation: his father had taken a loan from Mannheim and was set up to take the fall when the police busted one of Mannheim's criminal enterprises.
5	5	"A Little Piece of Home"	Toshihiko Masuda	Hilary J. Bader	September 14, 1996
During the opening of a museum, Superman tries to stop two robbers, but fails after falling victim to the poisoning effects of Kryptonite, one of the exhibited rocks. Lex Luthor sees the surveillance tape of the event and determines that this must be Superman's weakness. Luthor orchestrates a scheme to trap Superman and kill him using Kryptonite.
6	6	"Feeding Time"	Curt Geda	Robert Goodman	September 21, 1996
Janitor Rudy Jones runs into an accident with stolen chemical barrels and becomes Parasite. He feeds on the energy of others, with his number one choice being Superman. In doing so, he discovers Superman's identity.
7	7	"The Way of All Flesh"	Kenji Hachizaki	Stan Berkowitz	October 19, 1996
Thanks to the orchestrations of Luthor, terrorist John Corben becomes Metallo, a cyborg with a Kryptonite heart. Luthor then sets the supervillain on a quest to kill Superman, but Corben begins to question his role as Metallo as he lacks any human senses.
8	8	"Stolen Memories"	Curt Geda	Rich Fogel	November 2, 1996
Brainiac comes to Earth as part of his information-gathering trek across the galaxy, and partners with Lex Luthor on the basis of giving technological progress to humanity. But, as Superman discovers, Brainiac intends to destroy Earth after gathering all of its knowledge.
9	9	"The Main Man"	Dan Riba	Paul Dini	November 9, 1996
10	10	"The Main Man"	Dan Riba	Paul Dini	November 16, 1996
Intergalactic bounty hunter Lobo is employed to capture the Man of Steel for the alien Preserver, who is obsessed with keeping endangered species in captivity to protect them and prevent their extinction. Superman, the last Kryptonian, is the latest catch for his collection. Upon realizing that Lobo is the last Czarnian (having killed all the others himself), he betrays him and adds him to the collection as well. Superman and Lobo team up to escape the Preserver's holdings. Additionally, they must fight off a vile band of competing bounty hunters who share a vendetta against Lobo. Note: Starro makes a cameo appearance as one of the creatures captured by the Preserver. It will later play a key role in the Batman Beyond episode "The Call".
11	11	"My Girl"	Yuichiro Yano	Hilary J. Bader	November 23, 1996
Clark's high school sweetheart Lana Lang, who is now a famous fashion designer, comes to Metropolis where she and Lex Luthor become a celebrity couple. Lana still has strong feelings for Clark, and additionally deduced his secret identity long ago. Hoping to become his sidekick (and lover), she puts her own life in danger by spying on Luthor's arms sales to gain incriminating information.
12	12	"Tools of the Trade"	Curt Geda	Mark Evanier	February 1, 1997
Bruno Mannheim's Intergang terrorizes Metropolis with hi-tech weapons from a mysterious backer (Darkseid's minion Kanto), while SCU inspector Dan Turpin goes on a personal hunt for answers. Turpin has been the subject of media jokes that Superman must do everything, until Superman appears on camera saying it was actually Turpin who saved Superman's life by stopping one of the deadly weapons. In the end, Mannheim meets his new boss, the evil lord Darkseid.
13	13	"Two's a Crowd"	Hiroyuki Aoyama	Stan Berkowitz	February 15, 1997
When embittered scientist Earl Garver goes into a coma before revealing the location of a ticking bomb, Superman risks enlisting the Parasite to drain the information from Garver's mind. However, the operation goes awry when Garver's consciousness ends up in Parasite's body, leaving the two fighting for control.

=== Season 2 (1997–1998) ===
Episodes of season two originally aired Saturday mornings prior to The New Batman/Superman Adventures on Kids' WB!.

No. overall	No. in season	Title	Directed by	Written by	Original release date
14	1	"Blasts From the Past"	Dan Riba	Robert Goodman	September 8, 1997
15	2	"Blasts From the Past"	Dan Riba	Robert Goodman	September 9, 1997
After discovering the Phantom Zone projector in his spaceship, Superman makes contact with and releases a prisoner whose sentence is complete. She is a Kryptonian named Mala, and she quickly gains the same abilities as Superman. She soon becomes power-hungry and Superman feels she may have to return to the Phantom Zone. Upon this threat, Mala uses the projector to release her General, Jax-Ur. After Jax-Ur gains powers, he and Mala imprison Superman in the Phantom Zone, destroy the projector, and begin their conquest of Earth. With the help of Professor Hamilton, Superman must find a way to escape from the Phantom Zone and deal with the two soldiers.
16	3	"The Prometheon"	Nobuo Tomizawa	Story by : Alan Burnett and Stan Berkowitz; Teleplay by : Stan Berkowitz	September 12, 1997
During a mission in space, Superman discovers a massive humanoid stone giant named the Prometheon latched to an asteroid. The Prometheon breaks loose and plummets to Metropolis. It causes devastation and accumulates energy by sucking up heat from firepower and power plants.
17	4	"Speed Demons"	Toshihiko Masuda	Rich Fogel	September 13, 1997
Superman and Flash compete in a charity running race around the world to determine who truly is the fastest man alive. Meanwhile, a menace called the Weather Wizard harnesses enough power to create devastating storms across the globe, deriving energy from special armbands attached to Superman and Flash. The two heroes, after discovering this, put their race on hold to stop him. Note: Based on the comic story "Superman's Race With the Flash!" (Superman #199, March 1976) by Jim Shooter and Curt Swan. For this episode, composer Michael McCuistion reuses Shirley Walker's theme for the Flash from the 1990 live-action television series.
18	5	"Livewire"	Curt Geda	Evan Dorkin & Sarah Dyer	September 13, 1997
Leslie Willis, an obnoxious shock jock and critic of Superman, holds a rock concert during a thunderstorm, but is struck by lightning and transformed into the electric villainess Livewire. Superman must defeat her before she sucks the city dry of electricity.
19	6	"Identity Crisis"	Curt Geda	Story by : Joe R. Lansdale & Robert Goodman; Teleplay by : Robert Goodman	September 15, 1997
Superman encounters a clone of himself who decays into a flawed version dubbed Bizarro. The clone continuously claims to be the true Superman until discovering the truth of his origins — a secret cloning operation led by Lex Luthor, who hopes to create an army of Supermen at his disposal.
20	7	"Target"	Curt Geda	Hilary J. Bader	September 19, 1997
Lois finds herself marked for death by stalker and former LexCorp employee Edward Lytener. Superman saves her a few times from the murderous attempts, but he cannot protect her 24/7.
21	8	"Mxyzpixilated"	Dan Riba	Paul Dini	September 20, 1997
A powerful fifth-dimensional imp named Mister Mxyzptlk starts annoying Superman by appearing every 90 days to cause trouble and mischief. However, he becomes equally aggravated because Superman repeatedly tricks him into saying, spelling or revealing his own name backward, sending him back to the 5th dimension. Mxyzptlk returns with a proposition for Superman—get him to say or spell his own name backward twice in a row, and he will leave Superman alone forever. Note: The opening scenes were adapted from "The Mysterious Mr. Mxyzptlk!" (Superman #30, October 1944) by Jerry Siegel and Ira Yarbrough.
22	9	"Action Figures"	Kenji Hachizaki	Hilary J. Bader	September 20, 1997
An amnesiac Metallo reemerges from the ocean and washes ashore on a volcanic island, where two children find and befriend him. As Metallo gradually regains his memories, he becomes evil again and seeks revenge on Superman.
23	10	"Double Dose"	Yuichiro Yano	Hilary J. Bader	September 22, 1997
Livewire escapes from prison, eager to punish Superman for placing her there. She teams up with Parasite to cause mayhem once again.
24	11	"Solar Power"	Kazuhide Tomonaga	Robert Goodman	September 26, 1997
Edward Lytener returns as Luminus to seek revenge against Superman, depowering him by hacking Luthor's satellites to make Earth's sunlight red. He ties up and gags Jimmy and Lois and uses them as bait for Superman, who finally saves them.
25	12	"Brave New Metropolis"	Curt Geda	Story by : Stan Berkowitz & Alan Burnett; Teleplay by : Stan Berkowitz	September 27, 1997
After an accident with a portal at S.T.A.R. Labs, Lois is transported to a parallel universe where she was killed while investigating Intergang, causing Superman to join forces with Lex Luthor to create a police state of control. When Lois learns how much Superman cared for her, she desperately seeks a way back home so she can share her true feelings for him as well.
26	13	"Monkey Fun"	Curt Geda	Evan Dorkin & Sarah Dyer	September 27, 1997
A chimpanzee is found floating in space, returning from years of suspended animation in his ship. It turns out the chimpanzee, named Titano, was a beloved companion of Lois during her childhood. In space, Titano encountered a radioactive asteroid, causing him to mutate and grow drastically in size, becoming big trouble for Superman and Metropolis.
27	14	"Ghost in the Machine"	Hiroyuki Aoyama	Rich Fogel	September 29, 1997
Brainiac takes control of LexCorp's computer systems and traps Luthor in his own laboratory, forcing him to rebuild Brainiac's primary body in secret. After Clark questions why Lex is missing from his office, Superman and Mercy Graves team up to investigate his disappearance.
28	15	"Father's Day"	Dan Riba	Mark Evanier & Steve Gerber	October 3, 1997
To curry his father's favor, the New God brute Kalibak goes to Earth to destroy Superman. Meanwhile, Jonathan and Martha Kent are visiting Superman in Metropolis for Father's Day. The city takes a beating as the two sons battle it out.
29	16	"World's Finest"	Toshihiko Masuda	Story by : Alan Burnett & Paul Dini; Teleplay by : Alan Burnett, Paul Dini & Rich Fogel	October 4, 1997
30	17	"World's Finest"	Toshihiko Masuda	Story by : Alan Burnett & Paul Dini; Teleplay by : Steve Gerber	October 4, 1997
31	18	"World's Finest"	Toshihiko Masuda	Story by : Alan Burnett & Paul Dini; Teleplay by : Stan Berkowitz	October 4, 1997
The Joker steals a large piece of Kryptonite and then comes to Metropolis, offering to kill Superman for Lex Luthor in exchange for one billion dollars. Meanwhile, Bruce Wayne visits Metropolis to negotiate a business deal with Lex. Bruce also uses this opportunity to suit up as Batman and hunt him. Superman, wary of Batman's vigilantism, uses his X-ray vision to discover his identity, while Batman uses a tracking device on Superman's cape to discover his. The Joker kidnaps Lois Lane and uses her as bait in an attempt to kill Superman. He has her bound and gagged in a LexCorp lab and calls Superman telling his location. Superman wears his radiation-proof suit, but Joker uses acid from his boutonnière to melt through the suit. Batman manages to stop him and save the two, causing Luthor to become irritated and give him one last chance to defeat the two. After the Joker fails to defeat Superman and Batman again, Luthor, out of fear that he will be exposed, tries to withdraw from the deal by killing him. This fails and leads instead to the Joker trying to destroy Metropolis in the Lexwing, while he uses the other half of the Kryptonite to try to stop him. It is ultimately up to Superman and Batman to stop this. Note: The episode was later released on VHS, Laserdisc and DVD as The Batman/Superman Movie: World's Finest.
32	19	"Bizarro's World"	Hiroyuki Aoyama	Robert Goodman	October 10, 1997
Bizarro, after discovering Superman's Fortress of Solitude, sees the demise of Krypton. Believing this is his own past, Bizarro constructs a "Krypton" in downtown Metropolis with the intent to destroy it in the same manner that Krypton was.
33	20	"The Hand of Fate"	Dan Riba	Hilary J. Bader & Stan Berkowitz	October 11, 1997
When an evil demon named Karkull is unleashed, Superman attempts to enlist the aid of the now uninterested wizard superhero, Doctor Fate.
34	21	"Prototype"	Curt Geda	Hilary J. Bader	October 11, 1997
LexCorp and John Henry Irons design a powerful prototype armor for the Metropolis SCU, which Lex hopes will make Superman's services unneeded. The SCU officer who pilots the suit, Sergeant Mills, proves a useful partner to Superman at first, but the suit soon corrupts the officer's mind, making him violently unstable. Irons is discouraged over the failure of his project, but Superman convinces him that it would be a valuable tool if he can find a way to stabilize it.
35	22	"The Late Mr. Kent"	Kenji Hachizaki	Stan Berkowitz	November 1, 1997
Clark Kent has evidence to clear a condemned man from a death sentence, but the situation complicates when Superman survives a murder attempt on Clark planned by dirty cop Detective Bowman. Superman does not want to sacrifice his dual identity, but he does not want an innocent man to be killed for a crime he did not commit. The investigative episode ends with a twist, plus a certain character's shocking realization.
36	23	"Heavy Metal"	Curt Geda	Hilary J. Bader	November 8, 1997
John Henry Irons, an ex-employee of LexCorp, has been developing a new, advanced suit for himself. When Superman is caught off guard from the reappearance of Metallo, Irons must suit up as Steel to help Superman.
37	24	"Warrior Queen"	Curt Geda	Hilary J. Bader	November 22, 1997
Maxima, the stuck-up queen of an alien empire, discovers her perfect mate: Superman. She takes Superman back to her native planet only to learn she has been deposed due to public outrage against her.
38	25	"Apokolips...Now!"	Dan Riba	Story by : Bruce Timm; Teleplay by : Rich Fogel	February 7, 1998
39	26	"Apokolips...Now!"	Dan Riba	Story by : Bruce Timm; Teleplay by : Rich Fogel	February 14, 1998
Bruno Mannheim and Intergang have returned to Earth, but their actions are only a prelude to Darkseid's all-out assault on Earth and Superman. The officer Dan Turpin helps Superman fight off swarms of Apokolips' demons. They limp on until a warrior from New Genesis, named Orion, arrives to assist them in the war. Orion, who is badly hurt is taken to STAR Labs for medical attention. Orion recovers quickly and explains the essential facts of the history between the two worlds and that Darkseid seeks to dominate Earth. Soon enough, Darkseid's forces arrive and stage an attack on an air force base which is repelled by Superman, Orion and the SCU. After a successful attempt to stop Darkseid's plans, the invasion of Earth begins and Superman gets captured and tortured. The people of Metropolis resist and try to fight the lord. Even after seeing Superman defeated and paraded through the streets the citizens of Metropolis continue to fight back which bolsters Superman's confidence. Superman, with the help of Turpin, manages to free himself from his bonds and subsequently a fleet of New Genesis ships arrives to stop Darkseid. Orion informs Darkseid that New Genesis's leader, Highfather, has placed Earth under his care and as such any attack after this day will violate the peace treaty between New Genesis and Apokolips. Darkseid calls off the attack and as a last act of spite vaporizes Dan Turpin. Superman, enraged with grief, begins to destroy an enemy tank. Later, Turpin's funeral is held, on a sunny hillside with a large crowd in attendance as Superman watches from afar. Note: This episode was dedicated to Jack Kirby, one of the founders of Marvel Comics who also contributed to several DC Comics (including the creation of the character Dan Turpin, who was modeled after Kirby's appearance in the series), and died in 1994.
40	27	"Little Girl Lost"	Curt Geda	Evan Dorkin, Sarah Dyer, Paul Dini and Alan Burnett	May 2, 1998
41	28	"Little Girl Lost"	Curt Geda	Story by : Rich Fogel; Teleplay by : Evan Dorkin & Sarah Dyer	May 2, 1998
Superman discovers Kara, the last survivor of a neighboring planet of Krypton named Argo, who takes the identity of her first cousin and becomes Supergirl. Anxious to fight crime like Superman, Kara soon gets more than she asked for. She and Jimmy Olsen stumble upon a teenage Intergang operation, led by the sadistic Granny Goodness. Supergirl and Jimmy are able to eradicate Granny's manipulative hold over the teenagers, but the mistress of Apokolips wants revenge. She summons her Female Furies to teach Supergirl some manners. Suddenly, Superman comes to the rescue and fights the furies. After a while they manage to defeat him and takes him to Apokolips to face Darkseid. It's now up to Supergirl to rescue Superman.

=== Season 3 (1998–1999) ===
Episodes originally aired in the Kids WB! block of The New Batman/Superman Adventures.

No. overall	No. in season	Title	Directed by	Written by	Original release date
42	1	"Where There's Smoke"	Dan Riba	Hilary J. Bader	September 19, 1998
Superman crosses paths with a fiery-tempered, metahuman thief named Volcana. She possesses pyrokinetic abilities and is on the run from a secret government agency. With the help of a telekinetic psychologist, Superman hopes to locate and help the misguided Volcana.
43	2	"Knight Time"	Curt Geda	Robert Goodman	October 10, 1998
Superman learns from Roxy Rocket that Batman has been missing from Gotham for some time now. Superman finds Robin, who has been battling all the crimes in Batman's absence, and rogues such as The Penguin, The Riddler, Bane, The Mad Hatter and Roxy Rocket. Disguised as Batman, Superman helps Robin investigate why his partner has disappeared, leading up to a confrontation with Brainiac.
44	3	"New Kids in Town"	Butch Lukic	Stan Berkowitz & Rich Fogel	October 31, 1998
It is the 30th century and Brainiac travels back in time to destroy Clark Kent before he can become Superman. Three Legionnaires from the future - Saturn Girl, Cosmic Boy, and Chameleon Boy - travel back in time to help Clark fight Brainiac.
45	4	"Obsession"	Dan Riba	Story by : Paul Dini, Andrew Donkin & Ron Fogelman; Teleplay by : Andrew Donkin & Ron Fogelman	November 14, 1998
Lana Lang is in Metropolis managing a series of fashion shows featuring the latest top model, Darci. When an attempt is made to kidnap her, Superman discovers the kidnapping was organized by Toyman, who is obsessed with Darci. Both Superman and Lang suspect the model knows more than she is letting on, and discover she hides a secret behind her origins. This would later be followed by the Static Shock episode "Toys in the Hood".
46	5	"Little Big Head Man"	Shin-Ichi Tsuji	Story by : Paul Dini; Teleplay by : Paul Dini & Robert Goodman	November 21, 1998
Mister Mxyzptlk returns and tricks Bizarro into attacking Superman. He must use both brawn and intellect to fight the formidable duo.
47	6	"Absolute Power"	Butch Lukic	Hilary J. Bader & Alan Burnett	January 16, 1999
Jax-Ur and Mala have escaped the Phantom Zone and subjugated an entire planet, dubbed New Krypton. After rescuing a distraught spaceship from a black hole, Superman stumbles upon New Krypton. At first, he feels he should leave Jax-Ur and Mala alone to rule as they please, but he reconsiders when he sees they are secretly creating a navy with the intent of attacking Earth.
48	7	"In Brightest Day..."	Butch Lukic	Hilary J. Bader	February 6, 1999
Abin Sur, a member of the Green Lantern Corps dies after crash-landing on Earth and passes his ring on to Daily Planet artist Kyle Rayner, who becomes the next Green Lantern. With Superman's help, Kyle learns the power of the ring and quickly becomes a valuable partner. They work together to battle the power-hungry, ruthless opponent Sinestro.
49	8	"Superman's Pal"	Kazumi Fukushima	Robert Goodman	February 20, 1999
Jimmy Olsen garners unwanted attention after news reporter Angela Chen dubs him "Superman's Pal". Jimmy soon runs into more trouble than usual, so Superman must come to his rescue more often. Meanwhile, Jimmy has begun dating a young Daily Planet intern, who has a "thing" for metal. She uses Jimmy to lure Superman into a trap—a confrontation with Metallo.
50	9	"A Fish Story"	Shin-Ichi Tsuji	Story by : Alan Burnett; Teleplay by : Hilary J. Bader & Rich Fogel	May 8, 1999
Creatures of the sea are acting in strange and aggressive ways lately. It turns out Lex Luthor is undergoing an unethical, underwater experiment and has also imprisoned the legendary Aquaman. Lois and Clark must help Aquaman before a war breaks out between Earth and Atlantis.
51	10	"Unity"	Shin-Ichi Tsuji	Paul Dini & Rich Fogel	May 15, 1999
Superman and Supergirl must save Smallville, and the world, from the Reverend, a gargantuan scouting probe disguised as a human reverend named Powell, as well as its master, an even larger alien parasite that wishes to unite Earth's inhabitants in perpetual unity.

=== Season 4 (1999–2000) ===
Episodes originally aired in the Kids WB! block of The New Batman/Superman Adventures.

No. overall	No. in season	Title	Directed by	Written by	Original release date
52	1	"The Demon Reborn"	Dan Riba	Rich Fogel	September 18, 1999
Ra's al Ghul and his Society of Shadows arrive in Metropolis to steal a mythical staff currently on exhibit. Ra's is dying as the Lazarus Pits can no longer heal him, and wants to use the staff to steal Superman's powers and sustain himself. It is up to Batman to locate and rescue Superman from the immortal foe.
53	2	"Legacy"	Curt Geda	Story by : Paul Dini; Teleplay by : Rich Fogel	February 5, 2000
54	3	"Legacy"	Dan Riba	Story by : Paul Dini; Teleplay by : Rich Fogel	February 12, 2000
Darkseid has Superman brainwashed into believing he is his adopted son. With Superman under his control, Darkseid sends him to Earth to decimate its military force and weaken the planet so Darkseid can take over. Lex Luthor halts the invasion by temporarily weakening Superman, who is imprisoned by the military and sentenced to death. Lois helps Superman escape so that he may pursue Darkseid. On Apokolips, the two titans have an epic battle to conclude the series.

== Crossovers ==
#	S	Title	Director	Writer	Series	Airdate
1	20	"Girls' Night Out"	Curt Geda	Hilary J. Bader	The New Batman Adventures	October 17, 1998
Livewire, Poison Ivy, and Harley Quinn join forces to wreak havoc in Gotham. With Batman and Superman away, Batgirl and Supergirl must team up to stop them and bring them to justice.
46	7	"The Call"	Butch Lukic	Part 1: Story by : Paul Dini & Alan Burnett; Teleplay by : Rich Fogel & Hilary J. Bader	Batman Beyond	Part 1: November 11, 2000
47	8	"The Call"	Butch Lukic	Part 2: Story by : Paul Dini & Alan Burnett; Teleplay by : Stan Berkowitz	Batman Beyond	Part 2: November 18, 2000
Part 1: Bruce's old ally Superman drafts Batman into the Justice League when he suspects there is a traitor among them. Despite Bruce's warning not to join, Terry goes against it and soon discovers a conspiracy against the League, in addition to facing hostility from some of the members. Part 2: To get to the bottom of the problem facing the Justice League, Batman must face off against his own teammates—including Superman himself. He must seek the help from Bruce who knew of an old enemy of theirs, Starro the Conqueror. Though he defeats it and a grateful Superman and the other league members offers him to join the Justice League, Batman refuses, understanding why the original Batman did not join the League full-time in the first place.
4	36	"Toys in the Hood"	Jerilyn Dever (animation timing), Brian Hogan (animation timing), Brian Sheesley (animation timing), Rich Collado (animation timing), Karen Peterson (animation timing), Fred Miller (animation timing)	John Ridley (Teleplay) / Ernie Altbacker & John Semper (Story)	Static Shock	May 3, 2003
Static teams up with Superman when his old nemesis Toyman appears in Dakota to find and locate his doll Darci after she escaped from him. It soon becomes clear that Darci intends to take over the life of another person — one Static must protect.
