= Yellow Lantern =

Yellow Lantern or variants may refer to:

== Botany ==
- Banksia lemanniana, a shrub known as Yellow Lantern Banksia
- Capsicum chinense, a chili pepper known as Yellow Lantern Chili
- Hainan yellow lantern chili, an unrelated chili

== Comics ==
- Yellow Lantern, the Bizarro World version of Green Lantern in DC Comics
- Sinestro Corps, a DC Comics organization also known as Yellow Lantern Corps
