= Bizarra =

- Bizarra as depicted in Action Comics #857 (December 2007). Art by Eric Powell.

Publication information
- Publisher: DC Comics
- First appearance: DC Comics Presents #71 (July 1984)
- Created by: E. Nelson Bridwell (writer); Curt Swan (artist)

In-story information
- Species: Amazon clone
- Place of origin: Htrae
- Team affiliations: Bizarro Justice League
- Notable aliases: Wondezarro; Wonder Woman; Bizarro Wonder Woman
- Abilities: Reverse abilities of Wonder Woman including super-strength and a magic lasso that forces one to tell lies

Bizarra is a fictional character appearing in American comic books published by DC Comics. Bizarra first appeared in DC Comics Presents #71 (July 1984), in a story written by E. Nelson Bridwell with art by Curt Swan. The character is a distorted version of the superhero Wonder Woman, based on the Superman villain Bizarro. She is a very simple-minded being, has reversed character traits, believes women are inferior to men, and speaks in reverse of what her true meaning is.

== Fictional character biography ==
=== Pre-Crisis ===
Bizarro-Wonder Woman is first shown as a member of the Bizarro Justice League team of social misfit heroes from Bizarro World. Their home base is an abandoned submarine at the bottom of the sea. The team consists of Bizarro, Bizarro Wonder Woman, Bizarro Yellow Lantern, Bizarro Aquaman, and Bizarro Hawkman. Batzarro had left the team to form the Insiders, a counterpart of the Outsiders.

Bizarro is bored being able to defeat his fellow Justice League members so he creates a Bizarro version of Amazo. Amazo steals the powers of the Justice League, including Wonder Woman, and gives them to the civilians of Bizarro World. After realizing the folly of his actions, Bizarro convinces Amazo to return the powers to the proper persons.

=== Post-Crisis ===
In 1985, DC Comics introduced a storyline titled Crisis on Infinite Earths. That company-wide story arc erased the established history of almost all DC Comic's characters. Bizarra was reintroduced in Action Comics (2007) is re-introduced as part of the Bizarro Justice League. The League live on the cube-shaped planet Htrae, which is populated entirely with Bizarro-type humans. Bizarra's lasso has the ability to force anyone tied by it to tell only lies. Bizarra is romantically interested in Bizarro, but her feelings go unrequited, as Bizarro is only in love with Lois Lane.

== Abilities ==
=== Powers and skills ===
Bizarra is depicted as having all the abilities of Wonder Woman, although in some incarnations several of these traits have been reversed, such as:

- "Lasso of Lies", a lasso that forces anyone tied by it to lie, instead of Lasso of Truth.

== Other versions ==
An alternate universe version of Bizarra appears in All-Star Superman. This version is an inanimate statue carried around by Bizarro, who claims that she was once a normal baby before being transformed into a statue.

== In other media ==
Bizarra Wonder Woman as depicted in The Super Powers Team: Galactic Guardians.

=== Television ===
Bizarra appears in The Super Powers Team: Galactic Guardians episode "The Bizarro Super Powers Team", voiced by B.J. Ward. This version was created by Bizarro using a duplicator ray.

=== Film ===
Bizarra appears in Lego DC Comics Super Heroes: Justice League vs. Bizarro League, voiced by Kari Wahlgren. This version was created by Bizarro using a duplicator ray.

=== Video games ===
Bizarra appears in Lego Batman 3: Beyond Gotham.
