= Bizarro League =

Group in DC Comics

Publication information
- Publisher: DC Comics
- First appearance: Superman #379 (January 1983)
- Created by: Cary Bates

In-story information
- Base(s): Bizarro World
- Member(s): Bizarro; Batzarro; Bizarro-Green Lantern; Bizarro Hawkgirl; Bizarro-Aquaman; Bizarro-Green Arrow; Bizarra; Bizarro-Flash; Bizarro-Hawkman

The Bizarro League, also known as the Bizarro Justice League, are the Bizarro version of the Justice League.

== Fictional team history ==
=== Bronze Age ===
Bizarro stole Lex Luthor's imperfect Duplicator Ray to create a world of Bizarros. Some of these insane clones formed a Bizarro-version of the Justice League. This team enforced their twisted version of justice.

The Bizarro World was destroyed in Crisis on Infinite Earths along with the Bizarro League.

=== Emperor Joker ===
When the Joker got 99% of Mister Mxyzptlk's power as part of the Emperor Joker storyline, he recreated the Bizarro League and the Bizarro World. When the imp got his powers back, he kept the new "Bizarro World".

=== Escape from Bizarro World ===
Under a blue sun, Bizarro gained "Bizarro Vision", allowing him to make imperfect clones of himself. Bizarro planned to destroy the Bizarro World to be the reverse of Superman (because Superman would never destroy a planet). In response, the Bizarro-Lex Luthor leads a revolt and unleashes Bizarro-Doomsday, but is unable to stop Bizarro from destroying Bizarro World.

== Members ==
- Bizarro-Superman - He is Superman's clone and the team leader and creator.
- Bizarro-Batman - He is the world's worst detective and Batman's counterpart.
- Bizarro-Green Lantern (also known as Yellow Lantern) - He is the Bizarro-Hal Jordan and a cowardly Sinestro Corps member.
- Bizarro-Hawkgirl - She can fly like her counterpart, but possesses biological wings.
- Bizarro-Aquaman - He cannot swim.
- Bizarro-Green Arrow - He sets up his arrows backwards.
- Bizarra - She has reverse powers of her counterpart Wonder Woman and was formerly called the Bizarro-Wonder Woman.
- Bizarro-Flash - He is made out of the Speed Force, making him super fast and intangible.
- Bizarro-Hawkman
- Bizarro-Cyborg

== Other versions ==
A version of the Bizarro League called the Bizarro Super Friends appears in Super Friends #18, consisting of Bizarra, Bizarro, Bizarro-Flash, Batzarro, Bizarro Green Lantern, and Bizarro Aquaman.

== In other media ==
=== Television ===
The Bizarro League appears in The Super Powers Team: Galactic Guardians episode "The Bizarro Super Powers Team", consisting of Bizarro versions of Wonder Woman, Firestorm, and Cyborg.

=== Film ===
The Bizarro League appears in Lego DC Comics Super Heroes: Justice League vs. Bizarro League, consisting of Bizarro versions of Batman, Wonder Woman, Green Lantern (Guy Gardner), and Cyborg.

=== Video games ===
- The Bizarro League appears in Scribblenauts Unmasked: A DC Comics Adventure, consisting of Bizarro Aquaman, Bizarro Flash, Bizarro Green Arrow, Bizarro Green Lantern, Bizarro Hawkgirl, Bizarro Krypto, and Bizarro Robin.
- The Bizarro League appears in Lego Batman 3: Beyond Gotham as part of a self-titled DLC pack.
