= Bizarro =

Comic book supervillain

- Bizarro as depicted on the cover of Superman Vol. 6 #13 (April 2024). Art by Jim Lee.

Publication information
- Publisher: DC Comics
- First appearance: Superboy #68 (October 1958)
- Created by: Otto Binder; George Papp; (based upon Superman by Jerry Siegel and Joe Shuster)

In-story information
- Alter ego: El-Kal (Krypton identity); Kent Clark (civilian identity)
- Species: Kryptonian Clone
- Place of origin: Bizarro World
- Team affiliations: Bizarro League; Legion of Doom; Injustice League; Secret Society of Super Heroes; Superman Revenge Squad; Outlaws
- Abilities: Superhuman strength, stamina, endurance, speed, recovery, and hearing; Invulnerability; Flight; Omnireplication; Reverse versions of Superman's powers: Kryptonite empowerment; Ice, x-ray, telescopic, and microscopic vision; Fire and vacuum breath

Bizarro (/bɪˈzɑːroʊ/) is a supervillain appearing in American comic books published by DC Comics. The character was created by writer Otto Binder and artist George Papp as a "mirror image" of Superman, and first appeared in Superboy #68 (1958). Debuting in the Silver Age of Comic Books (1956 – c. 1970), the character has often been portrayed as an antagonist to Superman, though on occasion he also takes on an antihero role while doing things in a backwards way.

In addition to appearing in the company's publications, he has also appeared in adapted media and tie-in products, such as animated and live-action television series, trading cards, toys, and video games.

== Publication history ==
Bizarro debuted in Superboy No. 68 (published in August; cover-dated October 1958), writer Otto Binder casting the character as a Frankenstein's monster pastiche that possessed all the powers of Superboy. Shunned for his unenviable appearance, the teen version of Bizarro only appeared in a single comic book story. An adult version appeared around the same time in the Superman daily newspaper comic strip written by Alvin Schwartz, debuting in Episode 105: "The Battle With Bizarro" (strips 6147–6242: August 25, 1958 to December 13, 1958). According to comics historian Mark Evanier, Schwartz long claimed that he originated the Bizarro concept prior to the character's appearance in Superboy. The newspaper version wore a "B" on his chest, as opposed to Superman's distinctive "S".

Schwartz stated:

I was striving, you might say, for that mirror-image, that opposite. And out of a machine which would reveal the negative Superman, came the mirror image – always remembering that in a mirror everything is reversed... The times were such that one-dimensional characters, your standard superheroes, even in comics, seemed rather simplistic, like paper cut-outs. What was demanded was the full dimensional personality – a figure that carried a shadow, if you like. I was certainly inspired to some degree also by C. G. Jung's archetype of "the shadow" – and Bizarro certainly reflected that, as well.

Binder introduced the adult version of the character into the Superman comic book, this time wearing an "S", in Action Comics #254 (July 1959). Bizarro proved popular, and eventually starred in a Bizarro World feature in Adventure Comics for 15 issues, running from issue #285–299 (June 1961 – August 1962), as well as in a special all-Bizarro 80-Page Giant (Superman #202, December 1967/January 1968). The character made forty appearances in the Superman family of titles – Action Comics, Superman, Superman's Pal Jimmy Olsen, Superman's Girl Friend, Lois Lane, Adventure Comics, Secret Society of Super Villains, and DC Comics Presents – from 1959 to 1984, prior to a reboot of the DC Universe, as a result of the limited series Crisis on Infinite Earths #1–12 (April 1985 – March 1986).

Bizarro was reintroduced into the DC Universe in a one-off appearance with characterization similar to his original Superboy appearance in Superman: The Man of Steel #5 (December 1986). He was later revived in the "Bizarro's World" serial that ran through the Superman titles in March and April 1994, and in Action Comics Annual #8 in 1996. In 1997, Bizarro appeared in Superman: The Animated Series, wearing a purple version of Superman's costume which has become Bizarro's usual outfit in the comics. An unrelated four-issue limited series titled A. Bizarro (July–October) was published in 1999.

== Fictional character biography ==
=== Pre-Crisis Bizarro ===
==== General Zod's Bizarro Army ====
General Dru-Zod had originally created bizarro duplicates of himself to dominate the planet Krypton. The Bizarros had no power because they were not under a yellow sun, but they were soldiers ready to kill and die without hesitation. This was the reason why Zod was banished to the Phantom Zone for 25 Krypton sun-cycles.

==== Bizarro-Superboy ====
Some 12 years later, totally oblivious to these facts, a scientist on Earth is demonstrating his newly invented "duplicating ray" to Superboy, and an accident causes the ray to duplicate the superhero. The copy, quickly labeled "Bizarro", is a flawed imitation as it possesses chalky white skin and childlike erratic behavior. Shunned by the people of Smallville, Bizarro befriends a blind girl named Melissa, and loses all hope when he realizes that the girl did not shun or flee from him because she was blind. Superboy is eventually forced to "kill" Bizarro using the remains of the duplicating machine, which acts like blue kryptonite (as opposed to green kryptonite, Superboy's weakness). Bizarro deliberately destroys himself by colliding with the duplicating machine's fragment, with the ensuing explosion restoring Melissa's eyesight.

==== Bizarro #1 ====
Years afterward, Superman's arch-foe Lex Luthor recreates the "duplicating ray" and uses it on the hero, hoping to control the duplicate that became known as Bizarro #1. The Bizarro that is created, however, is confused, stating: "Me not human... me not creature... me not even animal! Me unhappy! Me don't belong in world of living people! Me don't know difference between right and wrong – good and evil!" Luthor is arrested by Bizarro for re-creating him, but forgotten as Bizarro attempts to emulate Superman, creating havoc in the city of Metropolis and almost exposing Superman's secret identity as Clark Kent. When Bizarro falls in love with reporter Lois Lane, she uses the duplicating ray on herself to create a "Bizarro Lois", who is instantly attracted to Bizarro. In addition, he also used the duplicating ray on himself to create "New Bizarro" who later dies from exposure to green kryptonite. The Bizarros leave Earth together, determined to find a home where they can be themselves.

Superman encounters the couple once again, discovering that Bizarro – now called Bizarro #1 – has used a version of the duplication ray to create an entire world of Bizarros, who now reside on a cube-shaped planet called Htrae (Earth spelled backwards). Bizarro #1 and Bizarro-Lois #1 also give birth to a child who, while super-powered, appears to be totally human. Considered a freak by Bizarro standards (out of resentment for the way that he was treated by Earth humans, Bizarro #1 made a law named the Bizarro Code that decrees that they must act the opposite of humans, causing no end of lunacy), the child is the catalyst for a brief war between Htrae and Earth. Blue kryptonite is also invented during this war, as well as the temporary existence of Bizarro-Supergirl. Bizarro also has a series of adventures on Htrae, aiding a normal Jimmy Olsen when he is accidentally trapped there, preventing an invasion of blue kryptonite statues, and stopping the Bizarro version of Titano.

Bizarro's influence is also felt on Earth: Jimmy Olsen is inadvertently turned into a Bizarro for a while, and a new teen version of Bizarro travels to the 30th century and attempts to join the Legion of Super-Heroes. When he is rejected by the Legion, the Bizarro teen creates his own Bizarro version of the Legion, which Superboy eventually persuades him to disband.

When Bizarro encounters Superman once again, his powers are now the opposite of Superman's (such as freeze vision as opposed to heat vision and heat breath rather than freeze breath), and he attempts to kidnap Lois Lane. Bizarro also temporarily joins the Secret Society of Super Villains to battle the Justice League of America and Captain Comet.

Bizarro appears in the non-canonical story "Whatever Happened to the Man of Tomorrow?", in Superman #423 (September 1986). Bizarro goes berserk and destroys the Bizarro World and all of its inhabitants, then travels to Metropolis and wreaks havoc before abruptly committing suicide. This and many other deaths turn out to be the machinations of Mister Mxyzptlk, who had become evil and begun a rampage of crime. Superman is unable to undo the deaths, but kills Mxyzptlk and uses gold kryptonite on himself to remove his super-powers permanently.

Bizarro's final pre-Crisis appearance was in DC Comics Presents #97 (September 1986), which was also the final issue of that series. After being empowered by a Phantom Zone sorcerer, Mxyzptlk destroys Zrfff and Bizarro World, killing all of its inhabitants. Bizarro's severed head crashes onto Clark Kent's desk and addresses Clark before dying. Bizarro does not appear in Crisis on Infinite Earths, apparently because of this story's events.

This story directly contradicts a World's Finest story where it is revealed that sometime in the future, Htrae is transformed into a more normal world (egg-shaped rather than cubical) by the radiation from an exploding celestial body. The Bizarros are changed into normal people without super-powers, but still retain vestiges of their Bizarro Code, such as hanging curtains outside windows.

=== Post-Crisis Bizarro ===
==== Project Changeling ====
After the events of Crisis on Infinite Earths, Lex Luthor orders his scientific team to create a clone of Superman that was part of "Project Changeling". Incorrectly starting from the assumption that Superman is a human with metahuman abilities (his alien origin had not yet been revealed), the process results in a flawed copy, which Luthor dismissively refers to as "...this bizarre – Oh, forget it", before ordering for the subject to be disposed of. The clone survives and, although mute and possessed of only limited intelligence and vague memories of Clark Kent's life, attempts to mimic Superman. He kidnaps Lois Lane and is finally destroyed when colliding with Superman in mid-air. Each time he exerted himself, the clone crumbled slightly. When Lois Lane's sister Lucy Lane, who had been blinded in a terrorist attack, is exposed to Bizarro's dust, she regains her sight. While Superman had not expected this effect, he speculated that Bizarro heard the sister explain her partial recovery and may have deliberately allowed himself to be killed to cure her.

==== Bizarro II ====
A second Bizarro, able to speak and think better due to genetic engineering by Luthor, appears in a 5-issue substory in the clone plague story-arc titled "Bizarro's World" (beginning in Superman (vol. 2) #87). Before he died, this Bizarro seriously injured Luthor's scientist Sydney Happersen, kidnapped Lois, created a ramshackle dummy version of Metropolis in a warehouse (to parody Superman's frequently rescuing Lois, he deliberately exposed her to and "rescued" her from one lethal danger after another), abducted Lana Lang, proposed to Lois and apparently died in Luthor's labs. During this period, Superman also had to cope with an unending increase in his powers due to exposure to "Purple Kryptonite" in the climax of "The Death of Superman" and "Reign of the Supermen" storylines.

Bizarro would later turn up alive in his final appearance seen Adventure Comics 80-Page Giant by Tom Peyer and Kevin O'Neill.

==== Match ====
Match is a clone of Conner Kent who was created by the Agenda, a government organization, to serve them. Initially appearing identical to Conner with pale hair and eyes, Match later degenerates into a form resembling Bizarro.

==== Project Cadmus/S-01 ====
S-01 coined "Bizarre-O" is the first of Paul Westfield's attempts to clone a new Superman during the Fall of Metropolis storyline. Unlike Conner Kent, who was the thirteenth attempt and the only true success of Westfield's project, S-01 was considered a failure.

Superboy was recalled to Project Cadmus to discuss newly uncovered information regarding his own origin. Meanwhile, as the Cadmus directors and Dr. Packard debated what went wrong with S-01 and questioned Westfield's secrecy, Scrapper of the Newsboy Legion inadvertently leaned on the control panel of S-01's stasis pod, accidentally releasing him.

Upon breaking free, S-01 rapidly began to deteriorate, with his skin almost immediately taking on the chalky hue and ridged texture characteristic of other Bizarros.

==== Dabney Donovan's Bizarro ====
One other Bizarro is created using Lex Luthor's clone process by Dabney Donovan on behalf of Lex Luthor's estranged wife Contessa Portenza shortly after Superman regained his normal powers when he expended his electromagnetic ones. This Bizarro abducted Lex Luthor's baby daughter and intended to send her by rocket to another planet, emulating Kal-El's escape from Krypton. His pile of explosives and bombs, meant to launch the rocket, would have killed her instead, and Superman had to shield her when Bizarro threw the launch switch. Bizarro, already self-destructing from a genetic booby trap encoded by his creator, dies in the explosion.

==== Joker's Bizarro/Bizarro #1 ====
Another version of Bizarro possesses all the abilities of Superman, but with a childlike mentality and method of speech. He is created by Batman's arch-enemy the Joker when the villain steals the powers of Mister Mxyzptlk. Creating a twisted version of Earth called "Jokerworld" – a perfect cube with the Joker's image on each facet – the villain designates Bizarro to be the planet's greatest hero and leader of a reimagined "JLA" (the "Joker's League of Anarchy"). When Mxyzptlk regains his powers, the 5th Dimensional Imp allows Bizarro and several other beings to remain on the restored Earth.

Bizarro suffers a setback when captured by the Pokolistanian dictator General Zod. Zod beats and tortures Bizarro, simply because the creature resembles Superman. Superman rescues Bizarro. To help him adjust to the normal Earth, Superman rebuilds Bizarro's "Graveyard of Solitude" (the opposite of Superman's Fortress of Solitude).

In Infinite Crisis, Bizarro is tricked into joining the reformed Secret Society of Super Villains by Flash's foe Zoom. In a battle with the Freedom Fighters, Bizarro accidentally kills the Human Bomb, repeatedly hitting the hero to see the flashes of light that are produced from the kinetic energy of the blows.

Bizarro becomes involved when Kryptonian criminals, led by General Zod, escape to Earth. Wishing to create a home for himself, Bizarro travels into deep space to a solar system occupied by a blue sun. After creating a cube-shaped planet, filled with distorted versions of various buildings and locations on Earth, Bizarro is still lonely. The blue sun gives Bizarro a new ability called "Bizarro Vision", which allows him to create new Bizarros. When this fails, Bizarro kidnaps Jonathan Kent, Superman's adopted father on Earth. Superman rescues his father and helps Bizarro become his world's greatest hero.

Bizarro eventually appears on the planet Throneworld, befriending and aiding Earth hero Adam Strange and allies Prince Gavyn, Captain Comet, and Weird. Together they participate in the war between Rann and Thanagar, and against villains Lady Styx and Synnar. Bizarro eventually visits the grave of a deceased Jonathan Kent and is then sent with other Superman foes to the inter-dimensional prison, the Phantom Zone by rogue Kryptonians.

Bizarro has a series of encounters with former Secret Society ally Solomon Grundy.

During the events of the Blackest Night storyline, Bizarro confronts the Black Lantern version of Grundy. Bizarro destroys Grundy by driving him into the Sun.

Later, while investigating an object that crashes into a Metropolis park and leaves a massive crystallized crater in its center, Doctor Light and Gangbuster discover a Bizarro-like creature resembling Supergirl. The Bizarro Supergirl takes the heroes hostage, but is defeated in battle by the real Supergirl. It is revealed that the Bizarro Supergirl is a refugee from the cube-shaped Bizarro World, and was sent to Earth by her cousin after their planet was attacked by a being known as the Godship. Doctor Light attempts to take the Bizarro Supergirl to S.T.A.R. Labs, only to be violently knocked unconscious by Supergirl, who then absconds with her doppelgänger and her ship, hoping to stop the Godship and save the Bizarro World. After taking Bizarro Supergirl back to the Bizarro World, Bizarro Superman is reunited with Bizarro Supergirl.

=== The New 52 ===
In 2011, The New 52 rebooted the DC Universe. Two versions of Bizarro first appear in the Forever Evil event.

==== Subject A-0 ====
Five years ago, Lex Luthor, intending to create his personal army of Supermen, attempted to splice Superman's DNA with human DNA and injected it into a teenage test subject named Bobby who had been bullied over his glasses and braces. Instead, he transforms into a hulking white-skinned monster with cryonic vision, incendiary breath, and immunity to Kryptonite which is labeled "Subject A-0". Deducing his weakness, Luthor hits him with concentrated solar radiation that oversaturates his cells and kills him. Luthor then takes samples of the creature to continue his experiment, deciding to clone a purely Kryptonian body. Five years later, a capsule labeled B-0 is shown.

==== Subject B-0 ====
After the Crime Syndicate takes over the world, Luthor releases Subject B-0, though his transformation is only halfway through. Luthor commands B-0 to murder a security guard as a test. B-0 initially ignores the order but kills the guard after the guard threatens Luthor with a gun. Luthor realizes that B-0 will not commit murder but will protect Luthor as he seems to view him as a father figure. Luthor is pleased and decides to use the imperfect clone in his plan to take the Syndicate down. Later, when Luthor and his team of villains pass through a tunnel, B-0 is revealed to be afraid of darkness. Luthor tries to comfort him with a story about his own fears, but ultimately wonders whether the clone was a waste of time; B-0 then speaks his first words, "Bizarro... try", much to Luthor's surprise. Though initially doubtful, Luthor grows truly fond of "Bizarro", who proves to be a powerful asset throughout the event.

During the final confrontation against the Earth-3 invaders, Bizarro battles Mazahs, the alternate version of Luthor himself; although he initially has the upper hand, Bizarro is fatally wounded and left to die. Luthor desperately tries to fix him, to no avail, and they share a sorrowful goodbye. Enraged over the death of Bizarro, Lex Luthor murders his Earth-3 counterpart, avenging Bizarro. After the battle is over, Luthor restarts the cloning process; when one of his scientists states it should take about ten years to fully develop a perfect Kryptonian clone, Luthor corrects him by saying it will take only five years, revealing he intends to create a perfect copy of Bizarro.

=== DC Rebirth ===
Bizarro with Red Hood and Artemis on the variant cover of Red Hood and the Outlaws (vol. 2) #22 (July 2018). Art by Guillem March.

In 2016, DC Comics implemented another relaunch of its books called DC Rebirth, which restored its continuity to a form much as it was prior to The New 52. A clone of Bizarro is found inside of a tube in a train car stolen by Black Mask sometime after the Crime Syndicate of America incident. Red Hood and Artemis jump aboard the train car attempting to steal a weapon, not expecting it to be a clone of Superman. Bizarro eventually joins the Red Hood's Outlaws. During this time, Bizarro is stricken with a sickness which causes his cells to rapidly deteriorate. After saving his teammates in the Outlaws, he dies. Lex Luthor takes his body to try to resurrect him, on the condition that he be the property of Lexcorp. This results in Bizarro becoming extremely smart, surprising his teammates.

Bizarro and Artemis are briefly trapped in a different dimension, but return to Earth. Bizarro becomes the ruler of Hell after killing Trigon, and plans to be the ruler of Hell to make sure Earth is not in danger before saying goodbye to Jason Todd and Artemis.

== Powers and abilities ==
Generally, Bizarro's powers are identical to Superman's, with the most substantial difference being that they are reverse versions of certain abilities.

- "Arctic vision" unleashes twin beams of subzero light from his eyes which instantaneously freezes anything or anyone on contact; inducing frostbite and even hypothermia.
- "Flame breath" allows him to exhale a superheated napalm-like substance which causes severe burns with minimal contact and even melt steel at maximum intensity.
- "Vacuum breath" instead of wind breath, he can inhale large amounts of air to draw people and objects towards him.
- "Bizarro telescopic vision" which allows Bizarro to see a "short distance behind his head" rather than a "long distance in front of his head".
- "Bizarro microscopic vision" which makes objects "actually smaller to everyone" rather than merely "appear to be bigger to only the user".
- "Bizarro X-ray vision" which allows Bizarro to "only see through lead" rather than the ability to "see through anything except lead".
- "Spotlight vision" which allows Bizarro to project beams of light in the fashion of a spotlight from his eyes to highlight what he is looking at.
- "X-ray hearing" which allows Bizarro to hear through everything except lead.

When operating within an environment under a blue sun, Bizarro gains the ability to replicate new lifeforms from his own body mass. Using this power, he cloned a cube-shaped planet that has become colloquially known as Htrae (Earth spelled backwards). This world is populated by Bizarro versions of Superman, his family, friends, and enemies. Similarly, Bizarro's weaknesses are reversed: green kryptonite has an empowering effect on him – healing and strengthening his body similar to the effects of yellow sunlight on Superman; while only blue kryptonite (an imperfect duplicate of green kryptonite) affects Bizarro adversely in the same manner that the former does with normal Kryptonians; i.e., causing him debilitating pain and diminishing his superpowers.

== Other versions ==
=== All-Star Superman ===
Alternate universe versions of Bizarro appear in All-Star Superman. These versions are from an alternative universe called the "Underverse" and can transform others into Bizarros by touch. Superman befriends one of them, dubbed Zibarro, while stranded in the Underverse, and enlists the Bizarros' help in returning home.

=== Amalgam Comics ===
Bizarnage, a fusion of Bizarro and Marvel Comics character Carnage, appears in the Amalgam Comics universe.

=== Batman/Superman/Wonder Woman: Trinity ===
An alternate universe version of Bizarro appears in Trinity. This version was created by Lex Luthor before being abandoned in Antarctica and found by Ra's al Ghul, who used him as a pawn in his plan to decimate Earth. However, Superman tears off his hand before throwing him into a volcano.

=== Earth 2 ===
Brutaal, an alternate universe version of Bizarro from Earth 2, appears in The New 52. This version was created by Darkseid and Steppenwolf from the DNA of Earth 2's Superman before eventually decaying and being killed by Lois Lane's Red Tornado body.

=== Earth 29 ===
An alternate universe version of Bizarro from Earth-29, a universe inhabited entirely by Bizarros, appears in numerous series as a member of the Unjustice League of Unamerica, the Terribles, and the Legion of Doom.

=== Elseworlds ===
Bizarro has appeared in different Elseworlds stories:

- An alternate universe version of Bizarro appears in Legends of the Dead Earth. This version is a former media-star who owns an amusement park.
- An alternate universe version of Bizarro appears in The Superman Monster. This version was created by Viktor Luthor using the remains of the infant Kal-El, who died shortly after arriving on Earth. After Luthor abandons him, he is adopted by Johan and Martha Kant, whose son had recently died.

=== JLA: The Nail ===
Alternate universe versions of Bizarro appear in JLA: The Nail. These versions were created by Lex Luthor to hunt metahumans and disguised as robots known as the "Liberators".

=== Justice ===
An alternate universe version of Bizarro appears in Justice. This version was created by Lex Luthor and is a member of his Legion of Doom.

=== Superman: Red Son ===
An alternate universe version of Bizarro appears in Superman: Red Son. This version was created by Lex Luthor to overcome the original Superman before sacrificing himself to stop a nuclear missile that was accidentally activated during their fight.

== In other media ==
=== Television ===
==== Live-action ====
Tom Welling as Bizarro as he appears in his self-titled Smallville episode (2007).

- Bizarro appears in Superboy, portrayed by Barry Meyers. This version was created after Superboy was exposed to an experimental, lightning-charged duplicating ray. After going on a rampage, the double adopts the alias of "Kent Clark" and falls in love with and becomes violently possessive of Lana Lang before being healed by duplicated Kryptonite. In subsequent appearances, Bizarro is manipulated by Lex Luthor into attacking Superboy via a duplicated Lang, who convinces Bizarro to thwart Luthor, and is temporarily rendered human through extensive plastic surgery and an experimental process meant to copy Superboy's brainwaves to his own brain before being forced to reverse the process to save the weakened Superboy.
- A childlike clone akin to Bizarro appears in the Lois and Clark: The New Adventures of Superman episode "Vatman", portrayed by Dean Cain. Similarly to the "post-Crisis" incarnation, this version was created and raised by Lex Luthor to challenge Superman. However, Lois Lane and Clark Kent help the clone realize his true nature. After a battle with Superman, the dying clone goes on to destroy Luthor's lab and the DNA sample used to create him before dying in Superman's arms.
- Bizarro appears in Smallville, portrayed by Tom Welling. This version is a "phantom wraith" who was created by a Kryptonian experiment and imprisoned in the Phantom Zone years prior until Clark Kent accidentally releases it in the present. Due to being unable to survive outside of the Phantom Zone, the wraith survives by possessing various human hosts until it steals a sample of Kent's DNA to gain a physical form identical to his with all of his strengths and an inverted version of his energy absorption ability, with Green Kryptonite strengthening it and direct sunlight weakening it. After Kent defeats the wraith and the Martian Manhunter traps it on Mars, it escapes following a solar eclipse and returns to Earth where it briefly allies with Brainiac and assumes Kent's identity. However, it is eventually killed by Lana Lang, who overloads it on Blue Kryptonite.
- A Bizarro counterpart of Supergirl, also known as Bizarro-Girl, appears in Supergirl, portrayed by Hope Lauren and Melissa Benoist. This version is the result of Maxwell Lord plotting to frame Supergirl as a public menace by locating a permanently comatose, unidentified brain trauma patient who closely resembles Supergirl and altering her with Supergirl's DNA to gain her powers and appearance. Subsequently, Bizarro-Girl attacks Supergirl, who joins forces with Alex Danvers to stop the former with Blue Kryptonite bullets. Afterwards, she is taken into custody by Supergirl, transferred to the Department of Extranormal Operations (DEO), and placed into an induced coma until she can be cured or helped.
- Bizarro appears in Superman & Lois, portrayed by Tyler Hoechlin while Daniel Cudmore portrays his armored form and Paul Lazenby motion-captures his monstrous form. This version was a celebrity from the Inverse World who suffers from a Kryptonite addiction, which left him in a zombie-like state and resulted in him alienating his family. After cult leader Ally Allston takes over the Inverse World in an attempt to merge it with Earth, Bizarro dons a containment suit and travels to Superman's world, but is weakened by X-Kryptonite. Nonetheless, he successfully warns Superman of Allston's plans before he is killed by a X-Kryptonite-powered Mitch Anderson, with his body eventually ending up in the Department of Defense (DOD)'s custody before Intergang steals it. While experimenting on Bizarro, Intergang revives him before Lex Luthor captures and experiments on him further, which causes him to mutate into Doomsday. Luthor subsequently uses Doomsday as his enforcer until Superman eventually flies the latter into the sun, which Bizarro allows.

==== Animation ====
- Bizarro appears in Challenge of the Superfriends, voiced by William Callaway. This version is a member of the Legion of Doom.
- Bizarro appears in Super Friends, voiced again by William Callaway.
- Bizarro appears in The Super Powers Team: Galactic Guardians episode "The Bizarro Super Powers Team", voiced by Danny Dark. This version possesses a ray gun capable of creating Bizarro versions of its targets.
- Bizarro, based on the Silver Age comics incarnation, appears in series set in the DC Animated Universe (DCAU).
  - He first appears in Superman: The Animated Series, voiced by Tim Daly. This version is a defective Superman clone created by Lex Luthor, who intended to clone an army of Supermen. Through corrupted versions of Superman's memories, Bizarro makes misguided attempts to become a hero before Superman gives him a habitable, unpopulated planet of his own to do with as he pleases that he dubs "Bizarro World".
  - Bizarro makes minor appearances in Justice League Unlimited, voiced by George Newbern. As of this series, he has joined Gorilla Grodd's Secret Society. Prior to and during the episodes "Alive!" and "Destroyer", Luthor takes over the Society, but Grodd mounts a mutiny. Bizarro sides with the former before Darkseid attacks and kill most of the Society. Following this, Luthor, Bizarro, and the survivors join forces with the Justice League to thwart Darkseid's invasion of Earth.
- Bizarro appears in the "Tales of Metropolis" segment of DC Nation Shorts, voiced by David Kaye.
- Bizarro appears in DC Super Friends, voiced by Marc Thompson.
- Bizarro appears in the Justice League Action episode "Boo-ray for Bizarro", voiced by Travis Willingham.
- A Bizarro counterpart of Supergirl appears in the DC Super Hero Girls episode "#TheGoodTheBadAndTheBizarre", voiced by Nicole Sullivan. She comes to Earth to prove herself a better villain than her version of Superman.
- Bizarro appears in My Adventures with Superman, voiced by Jack Quaid. This version is a Kryptonian clone designed by George Otto Binder of a secret military project called Project Caliban and designated B-1Z. Additionally, he possesses a more humanoid appearance and became part of Superman's team during the battle against the Eradicator.

=== Film ===
- A variation of Nuclear Man (portrayed by Clive Mantle) inspired by Bizarro was considered to appear in Superman IV: The Quest for Peace before being cut.
- In 2007, film director Bryan Singer reported that he wanted to use Bizarro in Superman Returns's intended sequel, Superman: The Man of Steel.
- Bizarro appears in JLA Adventures: Trapped in Time, voiced by Michael Donovan. This version is a member of the Legion of Doom.
- Bizarro appears in Lego DC Comics Super Heroes: Justice League vs. Bizarro League, voiced by Nolan North. This version is a well-meaning klutz created by Lex Luthor using a duplicator ray in an attempt to create a Superman he could control. While inadvertently causing destruction in his attempts to help Superman look after Metropolis, Superman takes Bizarro to a planet he calls Bizarro World, where the latter protects yellow crystals. When Darkseid starts collecting the yellow crystals, Bizarro returns to Earth and steals the Duplicator Ray, which he uses on the Justice League to create the Bizarro League to help him, Superman, and the Justice League defeat Darkseid and save Bizarro World.
- The Red Son incarnation of Bizarro, renamed "Superior Man", appears in Superman: Red Son, voiced by Travis Willingham. This version retains the same origin, but is initially indistinguishable from the Soviet Superman and able to articulate. While fighting Superman, Superior Man receives constant power boosts from Lex Luthor, which mutates and eventually kills him as he dissolves in front of Superman.

=== Video games ===
- Bizarro appears in Superman 64.
- Bizarro appears in Superman: The Man of Steel, voiced by Sean O'Kane.
- Bizarro appears as a playable character in Superman Returns, voiced by John DiMaggio.
- Bizarro appears in DC Universe Online, voiced by Joe Mandia.
- Bizarro appears as a bonus character in Lego Batman 2: DC Super Heroes, voiced again by Travis Willingham.
- Bizarro appears as a support card in Injustice: Gods Among Us.
- Bizarro appears as a character summon in Scribblenauts Unmasked: A DC Comics Adventure.
- Bizarro appears as a downloadable playable character in Lego Batman 3: Beyond Gotham, voiced again by Nolan North.
- Bizarro appears as a "Premier Skin" for Superman in Injustice 2, voiced by Patrick Seitz.
- Bizarro appears as an unlockable playable character in Lego DC Super-Villains, voiced again by Nolan North.
- Bizarro appears in Justice League: Cosmic Chaos, voiced by Fred Tatasciore.

=== Miscellaneous ===
- Bizarro comics are referenced in The Sandman: A Game of You as "Weirdzos" comic books. While The Sandman series was published by DC Comics's adult-themed Vertigo imprint, the editors were reluctant to allow Superman-related characters to be featured in the latter.
- Bizarro appears in Superboy #8.
- Bizarro appears in Superman Adventures.
- From 2009 to 2021, Six Flags Great Adventure changed the name and theming of the Medusa to Bizarro before eventually changing it back.
- In 2009, Superman: Ride of Steel at Six Flags New England was rethemed to reflect Bizarro. The Bizarro theme lasted until 2015, when the roller coaster was reverted to Superman The Ride.
- Bizarro appears in the Injustice: Gods Among Us prequel comic. This version was created by Lex Luthor to stop Superman after he becomes more violent and tyrannical, but escaped before he could be completed, resulting in him developing gray skin and diminished mental capacity. After traveling to Germany and being mistaken for Superman by a civilian, the clone believes this to be true, dons a backwards Superman suit, and tries to establish peace. However, his lack of common sense and a basic understanding of human ways leads to him wreaking havoc and killing Weather Wizard and Heat Wave before the Trickster convinces Bizarro that they are friends and that the real Superman is an imposter and his enemy. Once the Regime learns of him, Superman meets with the clone, with Yellow Lantern naming the latter "Bizarro", but the clone escapes before the Regime can discover his origins. Following this, Bizarro accidentally kills the Trickster. Not understanding what happened, Bizarro takes the Trickster's corpse to the civilian he first met, but he calls for the Regime's help, leading to Bizarro returning to Luthor's lab. Fearing the clone will expose him as a double agent in the Regime working for Batman's Insurgency, Luthor sends Bizarro to the Fortress of Solitude, claiming the latter will find answers while secretly hoping his thrall Doomsday will be able to stop him. Bizarro and Doomsday's subsequent fight leads to Superman intervening and Luthor eventually using Doomsday to kill Bizarro before taking his corpse to study.
- Warner Bros. Consumer Products collaborated with Livobooks to produce the interactive motion comic Superman and Bizarro Save the Planet.
- An eighth-season episode of the sitcom Seinfeld, titled "The Bizarro Jerry," makes extensive references to Bizarro and his world.

== See also ==
- Bizarro World
- "H'El on Earth"
