= Lego DC Comics Super Heroes: Justice League vs. Bizarro League =

- Blu-ray Cover
- Directed by: Brandon Vietti
- Written by: Michael Jelenic
- Produced by: Brandon Vietti
- Starring: Diedrich Bader; Troy Baker; Nolan North; Khary Payton; Kari Wahlgren
- Edited by: Craig Paulsen
- Music by: Tim Kelly
- Production companies: Warner Bros. Animation; Lego Group; DC Comics
- Distributed by: Warner Home Video
- Release date: February 10, 2015
- Running time: 49 minutes
- Country: United States
- Language: English

Lego DC Comics Super Heroes: Justice League vs. Bizarro League is a 2015 American animated superhero comedy film based on the Lego and DC Comics brands, released on February 10, 2015, on Blu-ray and DVD. This is the third Lego DC Comics film following Lego Batman: The Movie – DC Super Heroes Unite and Lego DC Comics: Batman Be-Leaguered. Some actors from various DC properties reprise their respective roles, including Nolan North as Superman, Khary Payton as Cyborg, Diedrich Bader as Green Lantern (Guy Gardner) and Tom Kenny as The Penguin and Plastic Man. The film received mixed to unfavorable reviews from critics, with criticisms focusing on the silly and promotional tone and the characters, although the animation was praised.

== Plot ==
In Metropolis, the civilians are living their everyday lives until Superman arrives to save the day, much to their confusion, as there is nothing to be saved. As it turns out, Bizarro arrives, and he mistakes an octopus ride in a playground for a real octopus torturing children. Luckily, Superman fixes Bizarro's mess. Superman quickly decides that Bizarro needs a home away from Earth so he cannot cause trouble and takes Bizarro to a cubic planet with backward physics. Bizarro soon comes to accept his new home and decides to stay.

One year later, Giganta attacks Metropolis. While the Justice League deals with her, Batman soon discovers more to the rampage than meets the eye. As it turns out, Gorilla Grodd used his telepathic helmet to take control of The Penguin, Deathstroke, Captain Cold, and Giganta and steal vital technology and bananas while Giganta distracted the League. After knocking off Grodd's helmet, Penguin, Deathstroke, and Captain Cold turn on Gorilla Grodd and use the stolen tech for themselves. The Justice League then splits up to take down the villains: Flash captures Captain Cold, Plastic Man catches Deathstroke, Green Arrow apprehends the Penguin, Batman defeats Gorilla Grodd, and Wonder Woman, Superman, and Green Lantern Corps member Guy Gardner continue battling Giganta. Although he joined the Justice League, Batman still considers Superman untrustworthy, simply stating in his mind that he only joined the Justice League to keep an eye on Superman and ensure that he is prepared for the possibility that Superman would become a threat to mankind. Victorious, the League returns to the Hall of Justice, where Batman and Wonder Woman notice news footage of Superman breaking into LexCorp Tower. Superman, however, was in the kitchen making sandwiches at the time. But when he sees the footage, he realizes who it is and tells the League he will handle it himself. However, Batman takes Wonder Woman, Guy Gardner and Cyborg, to investigate.

They soon discover Bizarro broke in for a reason: to steal the LexCorp duplicator ray that created him. Bizarro then blasts Batman, Wonder Woman, Cyborg, and Guy with the ray creating Bizarro versions of themselves, dubbed Batzarro, Bizarra, Cyzarro, and Greenzarro. Bizarro takes his Bizarro League back to Bizarro World, but not before taking a bomb and freezing the League with his ice vision. After Superman thaws the League with his heat vision, the heroes follow them. As they leave, Lex Luthor discovers that the bomb Bizarro took was a kryptonite bomb he planned to use on Superman.

As the Justice League enters the atmosphere of Bizarro World, their vehicles dismantle. As it turns out, the planet had odd gold rocks which disrupt the powers and technology of anyone who is not Kryptonian or a Bizarro. The radiation renders Wonder Woman powerless, limits Guy's constructs to chickens, and causes Cyborg to fall apart, leaving Superman and Batman as the only unaffected Leaguers. They soon notice the Bizarro League battling Darkseid's forces, who have invaded the planet. After rescuing the Bizarro League from being crushed by DeSaad's weaponry, the Justice League learns that Darkseid invaded to steal the gold rocks and harness them to disrupt Earth's defenses. The Justice League team up with the Bizarro League to take on Darkseid's forces.

As Superman battles Darkseid, Bizarro uses the kryptonite bomb, believing it will help Superman. Unfortunately, Superman is immediately harmed and put in a coma. Darkseid thanks Bizarro for his 'help' and uses the Weirdiation rocks to attack Earth, succeeding in turning the Moon into a cube. However, Hawkman manages to shield the Earth from the Weirdiation ray. On Bizarro World, a dying Superman tells the two Leagues to use the Gold Rocks to overload Darkseid's weapon, which works. Darkseid and his remaining minions escape via a Boom Tube. However, both teams mourn the loss of Superman, and Batman finally sees the good in Superman. However, Bizarro states that Superman will live and uses his vortex breath to absorb the kryptonite radiation and save Superman. The Bizarro League then help the Justice League get home, but not before they rebuild some of Bizarro World.

Back on Earth, Luthor looks at a cell with Martian Manhunter. He states that even though the Justice League survived Bizarro World, they cannot hope to survive "Operation Doom".

== Cast ==
- Troy Baker as Batman, Batzarro
- Nolan North as Superman, Bizarro
- Diedrich Bader as Guy Gardner / Green Lantern, Greenzarro
- John DiMaggio as Lex Luthor, Deathstroke
- Tom Kenny as Penguin, Plastic Man
- Phil Morris as Green Arrow, Hawkman
- Khary Payton as Cyborg, Cyzarro
- Kevin Michael Richardson as Captain Cold, Gorilla Grodd
- James Arnold Taylor as Barry Allen / Flash, DeSaad
- Tony Todd as Darkseid
- Kari Wahlgren as Wonder Woman, Bizarra
- April Winchell as Giganta

== Reception ==
Lego DC Comics Super Heroes: Justice League vs. Bizarro League earned $2,502,947 from domestic DVD sales and $1,385,861 from domestic Blu-ray sales, bringing its total domestic home video earnings to $3,888,808.
