= Bizarro World =

Planet in the DC Comics universe

- First appearance: Action Comics #263 (April 1960)
- Created by: Otto Binder (writer); Wayne Boring (artist)

In-universe information
- Type: opposite planet
- Characters: Bizarro; Bizarro-Green Lantern; Batzarro; Bizarra; Bizarro-Flash
- Publisher: DC Comics

Bizarro World (also known as Htrae, which is "Earth" spelled backwards) is a fictional planet appearing in American comic books published by DC Comics. Introduced in the early 1960s, Htrae is a cube-shaped planet, home to Bizarro and companions, all of whom were initially Bizarro versions of Superman, Lois Lane and their children. Later, other Bizarros were added. Among them was Batzarro, the World's Worst Detective.

== History ==
=== Pre-Crisis ===
In the Bizarro World of "Htrae", society is ruled by the Bizarro Code which states "Us do opposite of all Earthly things! Us hate beauty! Us love ugliness! Is big crime to make anything perfect on Bizarro World!" In one episode, for example, a salesman is doing a brisk trade selling Bizarro bonds: "Guaranteed to lose money for you". Later, the mayor appoints Bizarro #1 to investigate a crime, "Because you are stupider than the entire Bizarro police force put together". This is intended and taken as a great compliment.

Originally a normal planet, Htrae is now cube-shaped. This is due to the intervention of Superman, who – after being convicted of doing something perfect on Htrae, which would normally be a capital offense – pointed out that the planet was shaped like a normal spheroid and agreed to cube it if his sentence were commuted.

Later stories introduced Bizarro versions of Superman's supporting cast, including Bizarro-Perry White, Bizarro-Jimmy Olsen, Bizarro-Morgan Edge, Bizarro-Lucy Lane, Bizarro-Lana Lang and Bizarro-Krypto, created by using the duplicator ray on characters other than Superman and Lois Lane, as well as the children of Bizarro and Bizarro Lois. There was even a Bizarro-Justice League and Legion of Super-Heroes: the Bizarro League and the Legion of Stupor-Heroes. Bizarro-Batman sported a Futility Belt full of cigarette butts, chewed gum, and other such priceless Bizarro treasures. Yellow Lantern had no power from his powerless Ring, was vulnerable to anything colored green and was the most easily frightened being in the universe. Bizarro-Aquaman could not swim. There is even a Bizarro-Marilyn Monroe, the ugliest of them all.

"Tales of the Bizarro World" became a recurring segment in Adventure Comics for fifteen issues from writer Jerry Siegel and artist John Forte, running from issue #285–299 (June 1961–August 1962). (Note: This material has been collected as Superman: Tales of the Bizarro World, DC Comics, 2000 ISBN 1-56389-624-9.) Animated Blue Kryptonite golems once erupted from Htrae's surface, bent on defeating the Bizarros and were cheered on by the Bizarro Lois duplicates.

Despite their differences, Bizarro and Superman have teamed up on occasion. One notable example happened in Superman #379, when a strange creature appeared to be devouring Bizarros. Fearing he would end up alone Bizarro tried to steal Superman's duplicator ray. Superman convinced Bizarro he would be better off trying to stop the monster before making any more Bizarros. The creature eventually devoured Bizarro, but Superman soon figured out that the creature was not trying to kill the Bizarros, but using their combined strength to defeat another creature which was trying to destroy Htrae. The first creature was created as part of a plan developed by none other than the Bizarro Lex Luthor, who Bizarro referred to as a "punk hero".

In the imaginary story Superman: Whatever Happened to the Man of Tomorrow?, which served as an ending to Silver Age Superman continuity, Bizarro #1 (the original Bizarro and the world's leader/greatest hero), was influenced to bad ends by the now evil Mister Mxyzptlk. Realizing that to truly fulfill the Bizarro Code he should stop being an "imperfect perfect duplicate" of Superman and be a "perfect imperfect duplicate" of Superman, Bizarro resolves to alter his methods accordingly. To that end, Bizarro #1 deliberately destroys Bizarro World, reasoning that if Superman's homeworld (Krypton) was destroyed in an accident, Bizarro must destroy his own world on purpose. After Bizarro goes on a murder spree to continue his goal of being Superman's opposite, he kills himself using blue kryptonite, reasoning that where Superman is alive Bizarro "must" be dead. His final words were "Hello, Superman. Hello."

Bizarro World's final pre-Crisis appearance was in DC Comics Presents #97 (September 1986), which was also the final issue of that series. After being empowered by a hideously disfigured Phantom Zone sorcerer, Mxyzptlk destroys Zrfff and then causes Bizarro World to implode, killing all its inhabitants. The Bizarros act unusually insane in this account, with Bizarro #1 rocketing his son to the core of the collapsing planet so he would be die.

It had been established that there was no "set" future for Earth-One, so the World's Finest story where it is revealed that sometime in the future, Htrae is transformed into a more normal world (egg-shaped rather than cubical) by the radiation from an exploding celestial body was only a possible future. The Bizarroes are changed into normal non-powered people as well, but still retaining vestiges of their Bizarro laws, such as hanging curtains outside their houses.

=== Post-Crisis ===
After the Crisis on Infinite Earths, John Byrne's Man of Steel miniseries rebooted Superman continuity. The editors and writers did not reintroduce Bizarro World in the reboot. Later, in Superman (vol. 2) #87, the second post-Crisis Bizarro clone creates a "Bizarro World" which is a warehouse made to look like a surreal Metropolis.

A Bizarro World did appear in a story of this era in the 1998 Adventure Comics 80-Page Giant by writer Tom Peyer and artist Kevin O'Neill. There, Bizarro demands that a technician at a SETI-like installation broadcast his diary. Having no choice, the technician looks over the diary, which retells the story of the classic cube-shaped backwards Bizarro World. Superman accidentally finds himself there and, to allay people's fears of him, (Note: This is not the first time Superman is the terror of Bizarro World. In a 1961 story, when Bizarro #1 goes to Earth and brings back a Superman doll as a souvenir, the children are terrified.) goes on a "constructive rampage". The original Bizarro, aka Bizarro #1, goes to Earth and attempts to stop Superman with the help of his friends. However, when the other Bizarros try to kill Superman, #1 stops them, saying that killing is the earthly thing that they must, above all, do the opposite of. Realizing that, however strange Bizarro World might be, its inhabitants are safer and happier than those of Earth thanks to Bizarro #1's leadership, Superman apologizes. To show his sincerity he hides a copy of the Bizarro Code where nobody will ever see it. The people hold a parade in #1's honor and with his loving wife Bizarro Lois #1 and their son, Bizarro Junior #1 at his side, Bizarro cries saying "Me am ... happiest creature in universe". When the technician finishes reading the story, he sees Bizarro is gone and, horrified, asks, "What if the journal itself is no exception to the Bizarro Code?". Elsewhere, the truth is revealed; Bizarro, who has no home and has no family and is held in contempt by Superman, weeps because he is the most miserable thing in the universe.

The distinctive cube-shaped Earth of Bizarro World briefly appeared in Infinite Crisis alongside the other Earths in space. A close-up, labeled Earth-0, is seen wherein a smiling Bizarro is strangling a smiling Bizarro-Lois, with Bizarros Hawkman, Jimmy Olsen, and Perry White standing alongside and laughing.

In "Escape from Bizarro World" (Action Comics #855-857, also published as Superman: Escape from Bizarro World), Bizarro captures Jonathan Kent and takes him to the cube-shaped world, prompting Superman to follow him. This version of Bizarro World was created in a star system with a blue star closest to Earth, by Bizarro by smashing asteroids together, with inhabitants created by firing eyebeams at organic life forms (first at himself to create Lois Lane) after gaining new powers from the nearby blue sun.

The DC Universe Halloween Special 2009 features several stories showcasing Bizarro World. The opening shows Bizarro reading a comic book to a large audience of Bizarro men and women clad in Halloween costumes. All of the audience members are bound and gagged, implying that they are being read to against their will as opposed to the traditional practice of gathering around to hear a story. Another tale reveals that Halloween in Bizarro World involves trick-or-treaters giving fruit to the houses they visit. The final story also reveals that Bizarro works at a Bizarro version of the Daily Planet, and also shows Bizarro versions of staff members like Jimmy Olsen and Cat Grant.

Superman #695 has Bizarro fleeing from Mon-El after a battle. In Bizarro-speak, Bizarro informs the hero that he is retreating to Bizarro World, and claims that he will soon return with a Bizarro Mon-El to help him defeat the original. This story was never followed up on, as Mon-El was sent into the Phantom Zone shortly after this encounter.

Bizarro World was seen again several months later in Supergirl #55. In it, Bizarro Supergirl (not the one accidentally created in Superman #140) recounts her origin, revealing that she was bound, gagged and locked inside of a spaceship sent from the cube-shaped world to Earth after it was attacked by a being known as the Godship. The issue ends with the modern Supergirl, Kara Zor-El, heading toward Bizarro World to liberate it from the Godship.

== Known inhabitants ==
- Bizarro – The Bizarro version of Superman.
- Bizarro Amazo – The Bizarro version of Amazo. Unlike the original Amazo, Bizarro Amazo can distribute the powers he copied onto those who lack them.
- Bizarro Ambush Bug – The Bizarro version of Ambush Bug. Acts like a normal earth human and is irritated by the presence of Bizarro Superman.
- Bizarro Big Barda – The Bizarro version of Big Barda.
- Bizarro Black Manta – The Bizarro version of Black Manta.
- Bizarro Brainiac – The Bizarro version of Brainiac, who founded Big City.
- Bizarro Catwoman – The Bizarro version of Catwoman.
- Bizarro Computo – The Bizarro version of Computo.
- Bizarro Doomsday – The Bizarro version of Doomsday.
- Bizarro Jimmy Olsen – The Bizarro version of Jimmy Olsen.
- Bizarro Joker – The only sane person in Bizarro World. He cries incessantly in comparison to the Joker's laughing maniacally.
- Bizarro Justice League – The Bizarro version of the Justice League.
  - Batzarro – The Bizarro version of Batman who is the "World's Worst Detective".
  - Bizarra – The Bizarro version of Wonder Woman who has reverse powers.
  - Bizarro Adam Strange – The Bizarro version of Adam Strange, here named Adam Familiar.
  - Bizarro All-Star – The Bizarro version of the superheroine All-Star.
  - Bizarro Aquaman – The Bizarro version of Aquaman who cannot swim.
  - Bizarro Atom – The Bizarro version of the Atom.
  - Bizarro Blue Beetle – The Bizarro version of Blue Beetle.
  - Bizarro Booster Gold – The Bizarro version of Booster Gold.
  - Bizarro Cyborg – The Bizarro version of Cyborg.
  - Bizarro Doctor Fate – The Bizarro version of Doctor Fate.
  - Bizarro Doctor Mid-Nite -The Bizarro version of Doctor Mid-Nite.
  - Bizarro Fire – The Bizarro version of Fire whose fires are blue instead of green.
  - Bizarro Firestorm – The Bizarro version of Firestorm.
  - Bizarro Flash – The Bizarro version of Flash who is made out of the Speed Force, making him super-fast and intangible.
  - Bizarro Green Arrow – The Bizarro version of Green Arrow who sets his arrows up backwards.
  - Bizarro Hawkgirl – The Bizarro version of Hawkgirl, who possesses biological wings.
  - Bizarro Hawkman – The Bizarro version of Hawkman.
  - Bizarro Hourman – The Bizarro version of Hourman.
  - Bizarro Ice – The Bizarro version of Ice.
  - Bizarro Martian Manhunter – The Bizarro version of Martian Manhunter.
  - Bizarro Metamorpho – The Bizarro version of Metamorpho.
  - Bizarro Mister Terrific – The Bizarro version of Mister Terrific.
  - Bizarro Plastic Man – The Bizarro version of Plastic Man.
  - Bizarro Robin – The Bizarro version of Robin.
  - Bizarro Shazam – The Bizarro version of Shazam (Captain Marvel).
  - Bizarro Green Lantern – The Bizarro version of Green Lantern who is called Yellow Lantern here.
  - Bizarro Zatanna – The Bizarro version of Zatanna able to speak backwards.
- Bizarro Krypto – The Bizarro version of Krypto.
- Bizarro Lana Lang – The Bizarro version of Lana Lang.
- Bizarro Legion of Super-Heroes – The Bizarro version of the Legion of Super-Heroes who were created by Bizarro Superboy.
  - Bizarro Blok – The Bizarro version of Blok.
  - Bizarro Brainiac 5 – The Bizarro version of Brainiac 5.
  - Bizarro Bouncing Boy – The Bizarro version of Bouncing Boy who is thin.
  - Bizarro Chameleon Boy – The Bizarro version of Chameleon Boy.
  - Bizarro Chemical King – The Bizarro version of Chemical King.
  - Bizarro Colossal Boy – The Bizarro version of Colossal Boy, who is able to shrink.
  - Bizarro Cosmic Boy – The Bizarro version of Cosmic Boy.
  - Bizarro Dawnstar – The Bizarro version of Dawnstar.
  - Bizarro Dream Girl – The Bizarro version of Dream Girl.
  - Bizarro Element Lad – The Bizarro version of Element Lad.
  - Bizarro Ferro Lad – The Bizarro version of Ferro Lad.
  - Bizarro Invisible Kid – The Bizarro version of Invisible Kid.
  - Bizarro Karate Kid – The Bizarro version of Karate Kid.
  - Bizarro Kinetix – The Bizarro version of Kinetix.
  - Bizzaro Lightning Lad – The Bizarro version of Lightning Lad.
  - Bizarro Matter-Eater Lad – The Bizarro version of Matter-Eater Lad.
  - Bizarro Mon El – The Bizarro version of Mon El.
  - Bizarro Phantom Girl – The Bizarro version of Phantom Girl.
  - Bizarro Princess Projectra – The Bizarro version of Princess Projectra.
  - Bizarro Shrinking Violet – The Bizarro version of Shrinking Violet, who is able to grow.
  - Bizarro Saturn Girl – The Bizarro version of Saturn Girl.
  - Bizarro Shadow Lass – The Bizarro version of Shadow Lass.
  - Bizarro Star Boy – The Bizarro version of Star Boy.
  - Bizarro Sun Boy – The Bizarro version of Sun Boy.
  - Bizarro Timber Wolf – The Bizarro version of Timber Wolf.
  - Bizarro Triplicate Girl – The Bizarro version of Triplicate Girl.
  - Bizarro Tyroc – The Bizarro version of Tyroc.
  - Bizarro Ultra Boy – The Bizarro version of Ultra Boy.
  - Bizarro Wildfire – The Bizarro version of Wildfire.
- Bizarro Lex Luthor – The Bizarro version of Lex Luthor.
- Bizarro Lois Lane – The Bizarro version of Lois Lane.
- Bizarro Lois Lane Jr. – The daughter of Bizarro and Bizarro Lois Lane.
- Bizarro Lucy Lane – The Bizarro version of Lucy Lane.
- Bizarro Jr. – The son of Bizarro and Bizarro Lois Lane.
- Bizarro Metallo – The Bizarro version of Metallo and enemy to many Bizarros.
- Bizarro Mister Kltpzyxm – The Bizarro version of Mister Mxyzptlk. He lives by the opposite of the Bizarro Code by fixing things up.
- Bizarro Morgan Edge – The Bizarro version of Morgan Edge.
- Bizarro Perry White – The Bizarro version of Perry White.
- Bizarro Shaggy Man – The Bizarro version of Shaggy Man. He only sits and thinks.
- Bizarro Sinestro – The Bizarro version of Sinestro.
- Bizarro Superboy – The Bizarro version of Superboy. Professor Dalton's imperfect Duplicator Ray had zapped Superboy and created the Bizarro version of him. He was accidentally destroyed by Superboy. A second version of Bizarro Superboy was responsible for creating the Bizarro version of the Legion of Super-Heroes.
- Bizarro Supergirl – The Bizarro version of Supergirl that was created by Bizarro Jr.
- Bizarro Titano – The Bizarro version of Titano who shoots Blue Kryptonite beams from his eyes.
- Bizarro Toyman – The Bizarro version of Toyman.
- Zibarro – The intelligent, powerless Bizarro version of Bizarro.

== Points of interest ==
- Daily Htrae –
- Fourtriss uv Bizarro –
- Mutropolis –
- Dali Planit (also spelled Dayli Planet) –

== Other versions ==
=== All-Star Superman ===
An alternate universe variant of Bizarro World appears in All-Star Superman. This version is a sentient planet that Superman believes to be a manifestation of an entity called a 'planet eater'. Htrae vanishes into the Underverse, a newly discovered dimension, at story's end.

=== Adventures of Superman ===
A story about Bizarro in the out-of-continuity digital-first anthology comic book Adventures of Superman from 2013 by Christos Gage and Eduardo Francisco ends with Bizarro given the tools to terraform an uninhabited planet to his own tastes. There, he encounters an Amazon with chalky skin who introduces herself as Bizarra. (Note: In the digital numbering, this is in The Adventures of Superman (vol. 2) #27; in print it is the single-issue The Adventures of Superman (vol. 2) #9.)

=== Earth-29 ===
In Grant Morrison's Multiversity series, Htrae has been allocated its own alternate universe and is now also known as Earth-29. As well as its imperfect inorganic equivalents of Earth-0's core superheroes, it retains its cubic shape, although now possesses a ring as well. Other planets in its universe are also cuboid in shape – Narr (Rann-29), Raganaht (Thanagar-29) which is home to a flightless Bizarro Manhawk (Hawkman) and an overpopulated Sram (Mars-29) which is home to Smarian Snitch (Martian Manhunter).

== In other media ==
=== Television ===
- Bizarro World appears in Super Friends.
- Bizarro World appears in Superman: The Animated Series and other related media. This version is an uninhabited planet that Superman allowed Bizarro to live on to do as he pleases and not harm anyone.
- A version of Bizarro World appears in the Teen Titans Go! episode "Robin Backwards". It is home to the Bizarro Titans, led by the lazy Nibor, and feature Grobyc, a robot that is mostly human, Nevar, who is always smiling in contrast to Raven, Boy Beast, an animal who can transform into any human boy, and Erifrats, who is just as ugly as Starfire is beautiful.
- A variation of Bizarro World appears in the second season of Superman & Lois. This version is located in a cube-shaped pocket dimension that can be accessed through the Smallville's Shuster Mines and was nicknamed the "Inverse World" by cult leader Ally Allston. In this Bizarro World as seen in the episode "Bizarros in a Bizarro World", Bizarro is a celebrity before a falling out with his family, Jonathan Kent developed powers and took the name of "Jon-El", Tal-Rho is an eligible bachelor who was on good terms with Kal-El, Lana Lang was a waitress who married Tal-Rho and gained superpowers, and Allston rose to power and took over the Department of Defense.
- Bizarro World appears in the Harley Quinn episode "Breaking Brainiac".

=== Film ===
Bizarro World appears in Lego DC Comics Super Heroes: Justice League vs. Bizarro League. Here, Bizarro is sent to Bizarro World by Superman to keep him out of trouble. When Darkseid invades the planet, Bizarro steals a duplicating ray from Lex Luthor and fires it at Batman, Wonder Woman, Green Lantern (Guy Gardner), and Cyborg, creating Batzarro, Bizarra, Greezarro, and Cyzarro. Its properties were also shown to adversely affect Wonder Woman (who becomes unable to fly and is constantly tripping up), Guy's power ring (limiting him to only be able to fly and make chicken energy constructs), and Cyborg (who is constantly falling apart and needs to be rebuilt).

=== Video games ===
Bizarro World appears in Lego Batman 3: Beyond Gotham. It is featured as a DLC map where the Bizarro Justice League have to defend Bizarro World from Darkseid.

== Bizarro World publications ==
In 2001 and 2005, DC released two anthologies featuring "bizarro" interpretations of the DC Universe by alternative cartoonists.

- Bizarro Comics (2001) — Under the premise of Bizarro deciding to publish his own comic book stories; edited by Joey Cavalieri, with contributions by Matt Groening, Kyle Baker, Liz Glass, Chris Duffy, Stephen DeStefano, Jessica Abel, Greg Benton, Ariel Bordeaux, Ivan Brunetti, Eddie Campbell, Dave Cooper, Mark Crilley, Jef Czekaj, Evan Dorkin, Hunt Emerson, Bob Fingerman, Ellen Forney, Dean Haspiel, Sam Henderson, Dylan Horrocks, John Kerschbaum, Chip Kidd, James Kochalka, Jason Little, Pat McKeown, Andy Merrill, Tony Millionaire, Paul Pope, Brian Ralph, Jay Stephens, Craig Thompson, Andi Watson, Steven Weissman, and Bill Wray, among others.
- Bizarro World (2005) — a second volume, also edited by Joey Cavalieri, with contributions by Jaime Hernandez, Eddie Campbell, Jordan Crane, Ariel Bordeaux, Charles Berberian, Peter Bagge, David Borden, Leela Corman, Mike Doughty, Todd Alcott, Aaron Bergeron, Farel Dalrymple, Kyle Baker, Dave Cooper, Ivan Brunetti, and Rick Altergott, among others
- Bizarro Comics: The Deluxe Edition (2021) — collects Bizarro Comics and Bizarro World

== In popular culture ==
The concept of "Bizarro" has been ingrained in popular culture where it has come to mean a weirdly mutated version of anything, not confined to characters in DC Comics publications.
