= Titano =

- Titano attacking the Daily Planet building in the style of King Kong, from Showcase Presents Superman Volume 2 (2006). Art by Curt Swan and George Klein.

Publication information
- Publisher: DC Comics
- First appearance: Superman #127 (February 1959)
- Created by: Otto Binder; Curt Swan

In-story information
- Alter ego: Toto
- Species: Meta-chimpanzee
- Place of origin: Earth
- Notable aliases: The Super-Ape
- Abilities: Superhuman strength and durability; Kryptonite vision

Titano the Super-Ape (/taɪˈtænoʊ/) is a supervillain who appears in American comic books published by DC Comics, primarily as a foe of Superman. The character is a small chimpanzee named Toto who was sent into space for a test flight, at which point an exposure of combined rays made him grow to gigantic size and gave him kryptonite-like powers. As a "super-ape", Titano rampaged through Metropolis several times in Superman and Superman's Pal Jimmy Olsen during the Silver Age, and also appeared in some "Tales of the Bizarro World" stories in Adventure Comics. After a poorly-received 1978 appearance, Titano was not used again in the comic.

Different versions of the character, with different origins, appeared in the post–Crisis on Infinite Earths and New 52 continuities.

== Publication history ==
Titano first appeared in Superman #127 (February 1959) in a story called "Titano the Super-Ape!" He was created by writer Otto Binder, penciler Wayne Boring and inker Stan Kaye. The character was inspired by the 1933 film King Kong, one of the many famous science-fiction and horror films swiped by Superman editor Mort Weisinger during this period.

The character was well received, so Weisinger decided to bring him back for a second story in July 1960. In the first story, Boring drew the character with a chimpanzee head on a giant gorilla body; for the rematch, Boring drew a gorilla head instead, making the character look more like King Kong.

Titano made another brief appearance in a January 1961 Superman story ("Superman Meets Al Capone!", issue #142), where he served as an introductory plot device to get Superman lost in time. By August 1961, Titano became a novelty character, appearing in a Superman backup feature starring Krypto the Superdog ("Krypto Battles Titano", issue #147), and this trend continued over the next few years, as Titano appeared in occasional "Tales of the Bizarro World" backup stories in Adventure Comics, and made lightweight appearances in a few Superman's Pal Jimmy Olsen stories between 1962 and 1965.

In 1978, Martin Pasko brought Titano back for a two-part story with the Atomic Skull in Superman #323 and 324 — a story that Pasko looked back on with regret, as revealed in interview from 2007: "I thought — foolishly, in retrospect — that I might be able to treat a giant ape that shot kryptonite energy from its eyes with the same straight face I brought to Bizarro. I couldn't, and matters were not helped by the art. We kept forgetting that what you got when you called upon the hyper-realistic and earthbound Curt Swan to draw menacing giant monsters invariably looked cute and cuddly at best, and at worst, like something that reminded you of an old Toho movie and made you look for the zipper. I seem to recall that the mail suggested that Titano was one Weisingerism that was best relegated to obscurity".

Titano appears in the June 2025 issue of Batman/Superman World's Finest (#38) in a story written by Mark Waid and drawn by Clayton Henry.

== Fictional character biography ==
=== Pre-Crisis ===
Originally named Toto, a chimpanzee who was dubbed "one of the world's most intelligent chimps," Titano was rocketed into space and bombarded by the combined radiation from two elements, which mutates him into a giant ape with kryptonite-based abilities. Renamed Titano by Lois Lane, he captures her. Superman stops his first rampage through Metropolis by throwing him across a time barrier and into the prehistoric past. A year later, Superman accidentally transports Titano back to modern Metropolis, and has to trick him into returning to the past.

Over the next few years, Titano is visited in the past by several characters, including Superman, Krypto the Superdog, Bizarro, and Jimmy Olsen.

After another trip through time into the present day, Titano is picked up by Allura, the ruler of a world of giants, who arranges to transport him to her home planet. Titano settles down with a female ape similar in size to him.

Writer Martin Pasko revived Titano in Superman #324 (1978). In this revival, Titano is manipulated by the Atomic Skull into becoming a ferocious killer, rather than being an original, but misunderstood super-ape.

=== Post-Crisis ===
The post-Crisis version first appeared in the "Tears for Titano" story in Superman (vol. 2) Annual #1. Titano was originally a normal baby chimpanzee used in cruel experiments. This lab is headed by Dr. Thomas Moyers and Amanda Waller operating under the orders of Sarge Steel. The chimpanzee gains his name from a mean-spirited joke by the other staffers.

A brief visit by Lois Lane to the government laboratories ends after Titano tries to escape his tormentors by leaping into Lane's arms. An accident causes the ape to gain super-strength and grow to enormous proportions. Attempting to kill Moyers, whom he sees as his tormentor, Titano is stopped by and engages in a battle with Superman. The presence of Lane causes Titano to calm down, as he considered her a friend. Moyers uses his equipment to reverse the transformation, but the stress of doing so kills Titano, who dies in Lane's arms. She later writes the Daily Planet article "Tears for Titano" in honor of him.

=== The New 52 ===
In September 2011, The New 52 rebooted DC's continuity. In this new timeline, Titano is redesigned and given a new origin as a mutant albino gorilla created by a deranged biophysicist. Additionally, he is only slightly larger than a normal gorilla. Titano is later depicted as a cyborg with a glowing inner body.

In the series Titans, Titano attacks a nuclear power station that is minutes away from meltdown. When the Teen Titans arrive, Beast Boy battles Titano while the plant is evacuated and Cyborg deals with the nuclear core. Starfire and Donna Troy knock out Titano, who is taken away by the military.

Titano appears in Supergirl (2025), where he is shrunken to the size of a dog, nicknamed "Tinytano", and joins the Super-Pets alongside Krypto and Streaky.

== Powers and abilities ==
A fusion between two meteors (green kryptonite and uranium) caused Toto to grow in colossal proportions. As Titano, his size and strength are many times greater than that of a human and he can project kryptonite beams from his eyes.

The post-Crisis version of Titano has similar powers, but he does not possess kryptonite eyebeams.

== Other versions ==
A Bizarro version of Titano from Bizarro World. Cover of Adventure Comics #295 (April 1962), art by John Forte.

- Bizarro-Titano, a Bizarro clone of Titano who possesses blue kryptonite-based powers, appears in Adventure Comics #295.
- Titano One Million, Solovar's descendant, appears in DC One Million.
- An alternate universe version of Titano from Earth-53 appears in Dark Nights: Metal.
- An alternate universe version of Titano appears in JLA: Earth 2. This version was created by Brainiac and Ultraman.

== In other media ==
=== Television ===
- Titano appears in The New Adventures of Superman episode "The Chimp Who Made it Big".
- Titano appears in one of Sesame Street's test episodes via footage from The New Adventures of Superman.
- Titano appears in the opening credits of Superman.
- Titano appears in the Superman: The Animated Series episode "Monkey Fun", with vocal effects provided by Frank Welker. This version was kept by Lt. Colonel Sam Lane and formed a bond with his daughter Lois Lane before being lost in space twenty years prior. After Superman finds him and returns him to Earth in the present, Titano gradually increases in size due to gases from the meteors and wreaks havoc on Metropolis before Lois pacifies him with a toy monkey. Titano is taken into the custody of S.T.A.R. Labs, who stop his growth and relocate him to a remote island where he can protect the local monkey population.
- Titano appears in the Justice League Action episode "Harley Goes Ape!". This version was tended to by Harley Quinn before she worked at Arkham Asylum.
- A hologram of Titano appears in the Superman & Lois episode "Closer".

=== Miscellaneous ===
Titano makes a cameo appearance in Superman Adventures.

== Homages ==
Characters based on Titano have occasionally appeared in comics homaging the Silver Age Superman:

- In Alan Moore's Supreme, the Titano equivalent is Stupendo, the Simian Supreme. Stupendo has a similar origin to the Silver Age Titano (except with Supremium radiation), but was subsequently befriended by Supreme and given a home on Conqueror Island.

== See also ==
- List of Superman enemies
- List of fictional primates in comics
