= Hainan yellow lantern chili =

Chinese variety of chili pepper

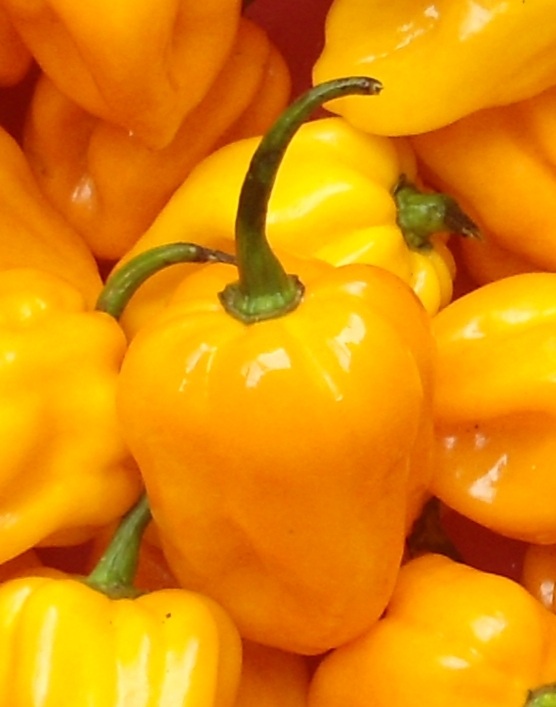
- Species: Capsicum chinense
- Cultivar: Hainan yellow lantern chili

The Hainan yellow lantern chili (Chinese: 海南黃燈籠椒; pinyin: hǎi nán huáng dēng lóng jiāo), also known as the yellow emperor chili (Chinese: 黃帝椒; pinyin: huáng dì jiāo), is a member of the Capsicum chinense species of chili peppers that grows mainly in the southwest and southeast of Hainan Island off the coast of Southern China.

== Description and use ==
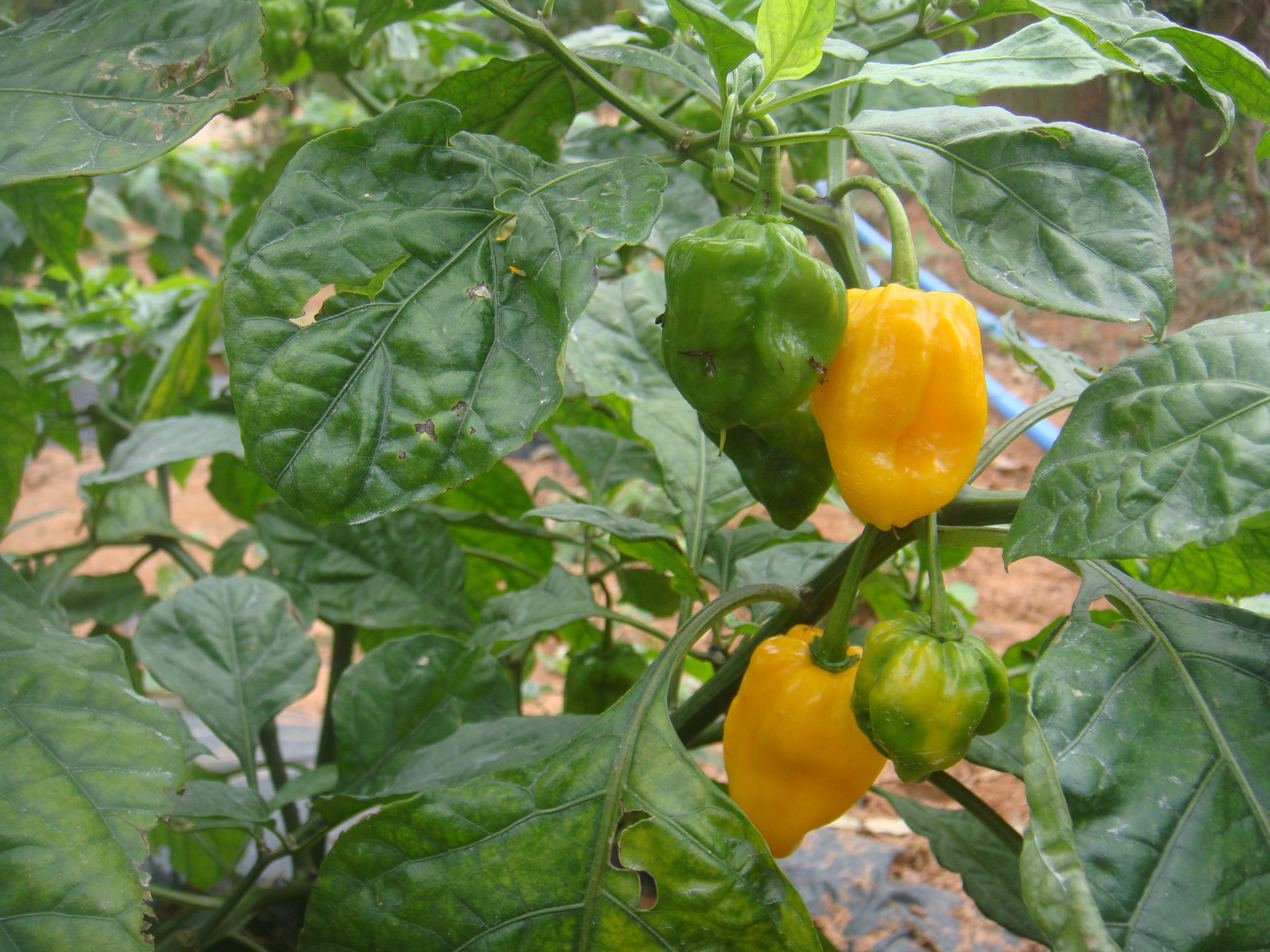
Plant

This hot chili matures to a bright yellow colour and is about 5 cm (2.0 in) long and 3.12 cm (1.23 in) wide.

== Cultivars ==
In 2009, the Tropical Vegetable Research Centre of the Chinese Tropical Agriculture Institute announced the breeding of a new cultivar that produces 10 times more fruit than the original variety. This has increased output from 500 kg (1,100 lb) to 5,000 kg (11,000 lb) per Chinese acre (mu).
