= Superman: The Animated Series =

American animated television series

- Genre: Superhero, Action-adventure, & Science fiction
- Based on: Superman by: Jerry Siegel Joe Shuster DC Comics
- Developed by: Alan Burnett; Bruce Timm
- Showrunner: Bruce Timm
- Written by: Alan Burnett; Paul Dini; Stan Berkowitz; Rich Fogel
- Directed by: Andrea Romano (voice director)
- Voices of: Tim Daly; Dana Delany; David Kaufman; George Dzundza; Clancy Brown; Corey Burton; Michael Ironside
- Theme music composer: Shirley Walker
- Composers: Kristopher Carter; Michael McCuistion; Lolita Ritmanis; Shirley Walker; Harvey Cohen
- Country of origin: United States
- Original language: English
- No. of seasons: 4
- No. of episodes: 54 (list of episodes)

Production
- Executive producer: Jean MacCurdy
- Producers: Alan Burnett; Paul Dini; Bruce Timm
- Running time: 22 minutes
- Production company: Warner Bros. Television Animation

Original release
- Network: Kids' WB
- Release: September 6, 1996 – February 12, 2000

Related
- DC animated universe television series

Superman: The Animated Series is an American animated superhero television series, based on the DC Comics character Superman. It was produced by Warner Bros. Television Animation and originally aired on Kids' WB from September 6, 1996, to February 12, 2000. It was the second series in the DC Animated Universe after Batman: The Animated Series, and like its predecessor, it has been acclaimed for its writing, voice acting, maturity, and modernization of the title character's comic-book mythos.

== Overview ==
Premiering ten years after the 1986 reboot of the Superman comic-book character, the animated series paid tribute to both the classic Superman of old and the newer "modern" Superman. For instance, the depiction of Krypton reflects the older idealized version in the Silver Age of Comic Books. The scope of Superman's powers reflects the more restrained contemporary concept as developed by John Byrne, in that the superhero has to struggle to perform spectacular feats. However, Clark Kent is shown to be open, if quietly, self-confident, without jeopardizing his secrets. This is similar to the depiction of Batman's alter-ego, Bruce Wayne, in Batman: The Animated Series.

Midway through the series' run, it was combined with The New Batman Adventures to become the package series The New Batman/Superman Adventures. The characters of Superman and Batman were then spun off into a new animated series, Justice League. That series also featured other popular DC Comics characters, including Wonder Woman, The Flash, Green Lantern, Martian Manhunter, and Hawkgirl. It spawned a sequel series entitled Justice League Unlimited.

Several episodes involve Superman encountering other superheroes in the DC universe. Batman appears the most often, along with several of his allies and antagonists from The New Batman Adventures, including the Joker, Robin, Alfred Pennyworth, Harley Quinn, Bane, Commissioner Gordon, and Ra's al Ghul, among others. In addition, other episodes feature The Flash (alongside Weather Wizard), Green Lantern (Kyle Rayner) (with Sinestro and the Green Lantern Corps), Aquaman, and Doctor Fate (along with his wife Inza and Karkull).

== Voice cast ==
Voice actor	Role
Tim Daly	Clark Kent / Superman, Bizarro
Dana Delany	Lois Lane
David Kaufman	Jimmy Olsen
George Dzundza	Perry White
Clancy Brown	Lex Luthor
Corey Burton	Brainiac
Michael Ironside	Darkseid
Joseph Bologna	Dan Turpin
Lisa Edelstein	Mercy Graves
Lauren Tom	Angela Chen
Mike Farrell	Jonathan Kent
Shelley Fabares	Martha Kent
Joely Fisher	Lana Lang
Victor Brandt	Emil Hamilton
Joanna Cassidy	Maggie Sawyer

== Episodes ==
Season	Episodes	Originally released	
Season	Episodes	First released	Last released
1	13	September 6, 1996	February 15, 1997
2	28	September 8, 1997	May 2, 1998
3	10	September 19, 1998	May 15, 1999
4	3	September 18, 1999	February 12, 2000

== Development and production ==
In the time between the initial end of Batman, Steven Spielberg approached Bruce Timm about his admiration for his previous show while being curious about an adventure cartoon. Spielberg asked Timm and his crew to come up with concepts for him to look at (one of these ideas eventually sprung into Freakazoid!, which involved a crazed superhero, although Timm had aimed for a straightforward hero show rather than overt comedy). At any rate, Warner Bros was anticipating a feature film of Superman and thus wanted to make a television series to go alongside it, which led Jean MacCurdy to approach Timm about the idea of doing a series on Superman, which he agreed to. Initially, Timm struggled with finding the visual style, to the point where he thought of trying to aim for a retro feel similar to the Fleischer Studios Superman cartoons. An original character design sheet showed the characters in a stylized 1940s/1950s style (not unlike that of the live-action Adventures of Superman TV series); however, Timm decided that he could not compete against the "perfection" of the past, although he would utilize influence from classic deco, which he described as "bright, futuristic, optimistic, ocean liner art deco...much more in line with Superman's character." As with the first season of Batman, the opening theme sequence of Superman lacked an on-screen title. Also like Batman, the opening theme for Superman lacked any lyrics, instead of being an instrumental piece played over various scenes from the series. The character design for the title character was inspired not by one of the comics but instead The Mighty Hercules (1963) with the design of the title character. DC asked Timm to give Superman a mullet, but he refused.

Koko Enterprise Co., LTD., Kyokuchi Tokyo Movie, Dong Yang Animation Co., LTD and Group TAC contributed some of the animation for this series. Like the previous shows, the animation on the series was done in traditional cels.

Season two was originally scheduled to run 26 episodes, but it was extended to 28 episodes to accommodate a two-part story introducing Supergirl.

While the series adapts many villains from Superman's rogues gallery in the comics, the primary antagonists that he faces throughout the show and the DCAU continuity as a whole are Lex Luthor, Brainiac and Darkseid. Luthor's design was based on actor Telly Savalas.

In the series, the writers decided to alter Brainiac's origin by making him a Kryptonian artificial intelligence instead of an alien to give him a more personal rivalry with Superman. While the producers of the show found Brainiac's character and abilities interesting in the comics, they disliked his original design so they drastically altered his appearance; his green skin was replaced with an icy-blue coloration, and the rest of his outfit became a mix of purple and grey rather than pink and black. Corey Burton's vocal performance as Brainiac was done in a cold, low-affect style similar to HAL 9000 in the Space Odyssey films and the 'Control Voice' heard during the opening narration of The Outer Limits. Before being cast as Brainiac, Burton also read for the parts of Superman and Lex Luthor. Clancy Brown also read for Superman before being cast as Luthor.

To pay tribute to Jack Kirby's Fourth World creations, the show introduced the New God Darkseid as Superman's archenemy. In contrast to the character's less faithful adaptations in Super Friends, Superman: The Animated Series portrays Darkseid as the evil dictator originally envisioned by Kirby in the comics. Michael Ironside's vocal performance was initially lowered for Darkseid's first two appearances in the series, though this modulation was later dropped in favor of Ironside's natural voice.

== Comic adaptation ==
As with the majority of shows in the DC Animated Universe, Superman: The Animated Series received a comic adaptation taking place in the same universe, that ran from 1996 to 2002, with 68 issues, an annual and a special issue featuring Lobo. Paul Dini wrote the first issue of the series, followed by Scott McCloud, Mark Millar and Evan Dorkin. Among the artists that contributed to the series are Ty Templeton, Rick Burchett, Mike Manley, Aluir Amancio, Min S.Ku and Neil Vokes.

== Home media ==
A DVD titled Superman: The Last Son Of Krypton, compiling the first 3 episodes of the series was released on February 3, 2004. Much like Batman: The Animated Series and other Warner Bros. cartoons adapted from popular DC Comic books, Superman: The Animated Series was released on DVD January 25, 2005, though it did not receive the same disc transfer as Batman did (the second disc of each volume was given the Side A/B treatment). The DVDs present the series' episodes in their airing order along with special features. Volume Two was released on December 6, 2005, and Volume Three was released on June 20, 2006. On November 24, 2009, Warner Home Video released Superman: The Complete Animated Series, a 7-disc boxed set that includes all 54 episodes of the series as well as extensive bonus features. On October 26, 2021, Warner Bros. Home Entertainment released Superman: The Complete Animated Series on Blu-ray, also including all 54 episodes and bonus materials.

A direct-to-DVD feature, Superman: Brainiac Attacks was released in 2006, although it is not considered to be part of DCAU continuity, despite featuring the same character designs as Superman: The Animated Series, as well as both Tim Daly and Dana Delany reprising their voice roles as Superman and Lois Lane, respectively.

DVD name	Ep #	Release date	Additional information
Superman: The Animated Series – Volume 1	18	January 25, 2005	Commentary on "The Last Son of Krypton Part 1", "Stolen Memories", "The Main Man" and "Tools of the Trade"; Superman: Learning to Fly Featurette; Building the Mythology: Superman's Supporting Cast; A Little Piece of Trivia – Pop up trivia over the "A Little Piece of Home" episode
Superman: The Animated Series – Volume 2 from The New Superman Adventures	18	December 6, 2005	The Dark Side: Behind the Villains of Superman: The Origins and Evolution of Superman's Adversaries.; Audio Commentary on "Brave New Metropolis" and "World's Finest Part 1" with Bruce Timm, Paul Dini, Glen Murakami, James Tucker, Dan Riba.; Video Commentary on Mxyzpixilated with Bruce Timm, Dan Riba, Paul Dini and Moderator Jason Hillhouse.
Superman: The Animated Series – Volume 3	18	June 20, 2006	Superman: Behind the Cape: David Kaufman (the voice of Jimmy Olsen) takes you behind the scenes with the show's creative team; Look, Up in the Sky!- the amazing story of Superman excerpts from the new documentary produced by Bryan Singer and Kevin Burns
Superman: The Complete Animated Series	54	November 24, 2009	Commentary by Bruce Timm, Paul Dini, Alan Burnett, Dan Riba, Glen Murakami, Curt Geda, Jason Hillhouse, James Tucker and Butch Lukic on many episodes; Superman: Learning to Fly – Explores the creation of the series; Building the Mythology: Superman's Supporting Cast – showcases the supporting players in the Superman Saga; Menaces of Metropolis: Behind the Villains of Superman – the origins and evolutions of Superman's adventures; Superman: Behind the Cape – David Kaufman (the voice of Jimmy Olsen) takes you behind the scenes with the show's creative team; Look, Up in the Sky! The amazing story of Superman – excerpt from the new documentary produced by Bryan Singer and Kevin Burns; Selectable Pop-Up Trivia Tracks; Bonus Disc Featuring the all-new Documentary The Despot Darkseid: A Villain Worthy of Superman

=== Altered sequence in "Apokolips...Now! Part II" ===
The original mourners attending Dan Turpin's funeral.

The mourners attending Dan Turpin's funeral in the edited version.

"Apokolips...Now!" was later altered from its original airing on February 7, 1998. Originally, Dan Turpin's funeral was a homage to Jack Kirby and featured several of his comic creations as attendees to the funeral including Nick Fury, the Fantastic Four, Big Barda, Scott Free, Orion and others, alongside Kirby's friends and fans Mark Evanier, Bruce Timm, Paul Dini, Alex Ross, his father Norman Ross, and Stan Lee. These characters were later removed and the scene pacing was re-edited for subsequent airings and its DVD release on Superman: The Animated Series Volume 3 Disc 3. Neither DC nor Warner ever commented on the decision to alter this particular scene, but it has been speculated that copyright issues regarding the use of the likenesses of Marvel Comics characters and the long-time rivalry between the two companies might have motivated the deletion. When Superman: The Animated Series was released on HBO Max and Blu-ray in 2021, the original version was used.

== Music ==
As with Batman: The Animated Series, Shirley Walker was in charge of the series' music. Walker wrote the series theme and composed themes for various characters, as well as scoring six episodes herself – "Father's Day", "The Hand of Fate", "Obsession", "Absolute Power" and the two-parter "Legacy". Unlike the previous series, only four other composers worked on the series – Kristopher Carter, Harvey R. Cohen, Michael McCuistion, and Lolita Ritmanis. Almost every episode had a completely original score; very few reused music from previous shows, and only one episode ("Superman's Pal", credited to Carter, McCuistion, Ritmanis, and Walker) was entirely "scored" with tracked material.

On January 28, 2014, La-La Land Records released a four-disc compilation of music from the series, collecting 20 complete episode scores, including those of the "World's Finest" three-parter, the "Apokolips... Now!" two-parter, the "Little Girl Lost" two-parter and "In Brightest Day...". It is a limited edition release of 3000 units made available through the label's website.

== Video games ==
Superman 64, released for the Nintendo 64 console in 1999, was the first video game to be produced based upon the series, however it is considered to be one of the worst Superman video games and worst games of all time. A second video game, Superman: Shadow of Apokolips was released in 2002 for the PlayStation 2 and GameCube consoles. It was produced by a different company, and was described as "a respectable but average superhero game".

== Accolades ==
Award	Year	Category	Nominee(s)	Result	Ref.
Annie Awards	1997	Best Individual Achievement: Music in a TV Production	Shirley Walker (for Main Title Theme)	Nominated	
Daytime Emmy Awards	1997	Outstanding Special Class Animated Program	Jean MacCurdy, Alan Burnett, Paul Dini, Bruce Timm, Dan Riba, Andrea Romano, Stan Berkowitz, Hilary J. Bader, and Bob Goodman	Nominated	
Daytime Emmy Awards	1998	Outstanding Special Class Animated Program	Jean MacCurdy, Alan Burnett, Paul Dini, Bruce Timm, Hilary Bader, Stan Berkowitz, Rich Fogel, Steve Gerber, Bob Goodman, Hiroyuki Aoyama, Curt Geda, Kenji Hachizaki, Butch Lukic, Toshihiko Masuda, Dan Riba, Andrea Romano, and Yûichirô Yano	Won (Note: Shared with The New Batman Adventures.)	
Daytime Emmy Awards	1998	Outstanding Music Direction and Composition	Shirley Walker	Nominated	
Daytime Emmy Awards	1998	Outstanding Sound Editing – Special Class	Robert Hargreaves, John Hegedes, George Brooks, Gregory Beaumont, Kelly Ann Foley, and Diane Griffen	Nominated	
Daytime Emmy Awards	1999	Outstanding Special Class Animated Program	Jean MacCurdy, Alan Burnett, Paul Dini, Glen Murakami, Bruce Timm, Hilary Bader, Stan Berkowitz, Rich Fogel, Bob Goodman, Hiroyuki Aoyama, Curt Geda, Kenji Hachizaki, Butch Lukic, Toshihiko Masuda, Dan Riba, Andrea Romano, and Yûichirô Yano	Nominated	
Daytime Emmy Awards	1999	Outstanding Music Direction and Composition	Lolita Ritmanis (for "Little Girl Lost: Part 1")	Nominated	
Daytime Emmy Awards	1999	Outstanding Sound Mixing – Special Class	Tom Maydeck, Robert Hargreaves, Patrick Rodman, and John Hegedes	Won (Note: Shared with The New Batman Adventures.)	
Daytime Emmy Awards	2000	Outstanding Children's Animated Program	Jean MacCurdy, Alan Burnett, Paul Dini, Glen Murakami, Bruce Timm, Hilary Bader, Stan Berkowitz, Rich Fogel, Bob Goodman, Curt Geda, Butch Lukic, Dan Riba, Andrea Romano, and Shin'ichi Tsuji	Nominated	
Daytime Emmy Awards	2000	Outstanding Music Direction and Composition	Michael McCuistion (for "In Brightest Day...")	Nominated	
Daytime Emmy Awards	2000	Outstanding Music Direction and Composition	Lolita Ritmanis (for "Fish Story")	Nominated	
Daytime Emmy Awards	2000	Outstanding Sound Editing – Special Class	Robert Hargreaves, George Brooks, Gregory Beaumont, Mark Keatts, John Hegedes, Linda Di Franco, Kelly Ann Foley and Diane Griffen	Nominated	
