= Kryptonite =

Fictional element from Superman stories

- Green kryptonite as seen in Superman: Secret Origin #1. Art by Gary Frank

Publication information
- Publisher: DC Comics
- First appearance: Radio: The Adventures of Superman (June 1943); Comics: Superman #61 (November 1949)

In story information
- Type: Element/compound
- Element of stories featuring: Superman; Superboy; Supergirl

Kryptonite is a fictional material that appears primarily in Superman stories published by DC Comics. In its best-known form, it is a green, crystalline material originating from Superman's home world of Krypton that emits a unique, poisonous radiation that can weaken and even kill Superman and other Kryptonians. Kryptonite radiation can be transmitted through any element except lead. There are other varieties, such as red kryptonite and gold kryptonite, which have different but still generally negative effects.

Adversaries of Kal-El (Superman) and other characters are frequently depicted using kryptonite against Superman, with Lex Luthor incorporating it into weapons, Metallo using it as power, and Titano able to project Kryptonite radiation from his eyes.

Kryptonite has entered common usage as a metaphor for a particular weakness or vulnerability, similar to an "Achilles' heel".

== History ==
Superman suffering from green kryptonite poisoning, courtesy of foes Metallo and Titano, in Action Comics Annual #10 (March 2007), art by Art Adams and Alex Sinclair (left). Superman and Jimmy Olsen discuss the mineral kryptonite, with the jewel variant making its debut, in Action Comics #310 (March 1964), art by Curt Swan (right).

An unpublished 1940 story titled "The K-Metal from Krypton", written by Superman creator Jerry Siegel, featured a prototype of kryptonite. It is a mineral from the planet Krypton that drains Superman of his strength and gives superhuman powers to humans. This story was rejected because Superman reveals his identity to Lois Lane.

The mineral kryptonite, not to be confused with the real element krypton, was officially introduced in the radio serial The Adventures of Superman, in the story "The Meteor from Krypton", broadcast in June 1943. An apocryphal story claims that kryptonite was introduced to incapacitate Superman, allowing Superman's voice actor Bud Collyer to take time off. This tale was recounted by Julius Schwartz in his memoir. However, historian Michael J. Hayde disputes this. In "The Meteor from Krypton", Superman is never exposed to kryptonite. If kryptonite allowed Collyer to take vacations, that was a fringe benefit discovered later. More likely, kryptonite was introduced as a plot device for Superman to discover his origin. Hayde may have mistaken 1943's "The Meteor from Krypton" for 1945's "The Meteor of Kryptonite", as Superman was exposed in the latter but not in the former.

In the radio serial, Krypton is located in the same solar system as Earth, in the same orbit, but on the opposite side of the Sun. This provided an easy explanation for how kryptonite found its way to Earth. In the comics' Silver Age, Krypton is located in a distant solar system and much of the kryptonite that came to Earth was transported by the same "space warp" that baby Kal-El's rocket traversed.

Kryptonite was incorporated into the comic mythos with Superman #61 (November 1949). In a 1993 interview with Florida Today, editor Dorothy Woolfolk stated that she felt Superman's invulnerability was "boring".

Originally depicted as an element in the Golden, Silver, and Bronze Age comics, Kryptonite is depicted as a compound in post-Crisis continuity.

== Varieties ==
Various forms of the fictional material have been created over the years in Superman publications and programs. This table includes forms that have not persisted in canon.

Type		First appearance	Origin	Effects by genetic origin			In other media				
Type		First appearance	Origin	Krypton Daxam	Earth	Bizarro World Krypton-3					
Type		First appearance	Origin	Krypton Daxam	Earth	Bizarro World Krypton-3	Film		Television		Video games
Type		First appearance	Origin	Krypton Daxam	Earth	Bizarro World Krypton-3	Live-action	Animated	Live-action	Animated	Video games
Green		The Adventures of Superman radio serial, "The Meteor from Krypton" (June 1943) Comics: Action Comics #161 (August 1951)	Fragments from Krypton’s destruction travelling through a space warp alongside baby Kal-El	Loss of superpowers Severe, intensifying pain Intensifying breathing issues Severe muscular weakness Fever Green blood or skin Eventual fatality Non-accumulative Mitigated by copious yellow sunlight exposure Blocked by lead Neutralized by Kal-El's ship (Smallville)	With prolonged exposure: carcinogenesis Possible cancer treatment Varying genetic mutations (Smallville) Temporary absorption of Kryptonian powers via electricity (Smallville) Synthetic medical applications (Smallville)	Bizarro: perfect health Bizarro World humans: temporary superpowers (Superman & Lois)	Superman serial; Atom Man vs. Superman; Superman (1978); Superman III; Superman Returns; Batman v Superman: Dawn of Justice; Superman (2025); Supergirl (2026)	Superman: Doomsday; Superman/Batman: Public Enemies; Justice League: Doom; DC Animated Movie Universe; DC League of Super-Pets; Scooby-Doo! and Krypto, Too!; Batman Ninja vs. Yakuza League	Adventures of Superman; Superboy; Lois & Clark: The New Adventures of Superman; Smallville; Arrowverse; Titans; Superman & Lois	The Brady Kids; Super Friends; Superman (1988); DC Animated Universe; Krypto the Superdog; Legion of Super Heroes; The Batman; Batman: The Brave and the Bold; Young Justice; Justice League Action; DC Super Hero Girls; My Adventures with Superman	Superman (1979); Superman (1987); Superman: The New Superman Adventures; Mortal Kombat vs. DC Universe; Lego Batman 2: DC Super Heroes; Scribblenauts Unmasked: A DC Comics Adventure; Lego Dimensions; Injustice: Gods Among Us; Injustice 2
Red		Superman #61 (November 1949)	Traversal through radiated space Mars (Adventure Comics #255, 1958)	Loss of heroism and inhibitions Unpredictable effects Counteracted by green (Smallville) Stronger form of green (prior to Adventure Comics #252, September 1958 only)	Unpredictable effects (prior to Superman's Pal Jimmy Olsen #80, October 1964 only) In bloodstream: same as on Kryptonians (Smallville) Hair loss (Super-Pets)			DC League of Super-Pets	Superboy; Lois & Clark; Smallville; Supergirl (2015); Titans	Super Friends; Batman: The Brave and the Bold; Krypto the Superdog; Justice League Action; DC Super Hero Girls	Superman (1987); Scribblenauts Unmasked
Red	-green -white	Superman #404 (February 1958)		Superpower restoration							
Red	-green	Action Comics #275 (April 1961)	Created by Brainiac	Unpredictable effects Loss of superpowers							
Red	-blue	Superman #162 (July 1963)	Invented by Superman Green charged with "quantum battery" (Justice League Action)	Splitting into uninhibited red being and logical blue being	Same as on Kryptonians (Justice League Action)					Justice League Action	
Red	Bizarro-	Superman's Pal, Jimmy Olsen #80 (October 1964)			Bizarro humans: Ridding of Bizarro state Humans: Same as red on Kryptonians						Scribblenauts Unmasked
Red	-gold	Superman #178 (July 1965)		Temporary memory loss							
Red	-green -gold	Superman #192 (January 1967)		Permanent superpower loss Permanent memory loss							
Positive Platinum		"All that Glitters," Adventures of Superman TV series (1958) Comics: Batman Secret Files #1 (December 2018)	Impossible world (dream of Jimmy Olsen, Adventures of Superman TV series/impossible world inside Phantom Zone, comics)	Source of superpowers (Adventures of Superman TV series)	Permanent Kryptonian powers				Adventures of Superman		
Negative Gold		"All that Glitters," Adventures of Superman TV series (1958) Comics: Adventure Comics #299 (August 1962)	Dream of Jimmy Olsen (Adventures of Superman TV series) Green affected by "atomic radiation"	Permanent loss of superpowers Temporary memory loss (Justice League Action)		Ultraman: Permanent scar (Smallville)			Adventures of Superman; Smallville	Super Friends; Justice League Action	Scribblenauts Unmasked; Injustice 2
Anti- Fool's Slow Hybrid		Action Comics #252 (May 1959)	Created by Metallo (The Brave and the Bold #175, June 1981) Created by Professor Jefferson Cole at S.T.A.R. Labs (Lois & Clark)	None	Same as green on Kryptonians	Ultraman: Perfect health			Lois & Clark		Scribblenauts Unmasked
X- Orange		Action Comics #261 (January 1960)	Experiment by Supergirl to counteract green Fragments from Krypton (Superman & Lois/Super-Pets)	None	Temporary superpowers Paranoia (DC Super Hero Girls) Counteracted by green (Superman & Lois, Super-Pets)	Bizarro: same as green on Kryptonians (Superman & Lois)		DC League of Super-Pets	Superman & Lois		Scribblenauts Unmasked
Blue		Superman #140 (October 1960)	Green subjected to Professor Dalton's duplicator ray Rare fragments among Krypton's remains (Super Friends)	Harm to soul Suspended superpowers (Smallville) Counteracts red (Super Friends)	Medical stability (Smallville)	Bizarro: same as green on Kryptonians Bizarro: death through overcharging (Smallville) Bizarro: logical thought Ultraman: perfect health/same as green on Kryptonians (Justice League: Crisis on Two Earths) Blocked by "imperfect" lead		Justice League: Crisis on Two Earths	Smallville; Supergirl	Super Friends	Scribblenauts Unmasked
White		Adventure Comics #279 (December 1960)	Green affected by "space cloud"	Kills microbes and vegetation	Kills microbes and vegetation						Scribblenauts Unmasked
White	Bizarro-	"The Battle with Bizarro," Superboy TV series (November 18, 1989)		Cellular health		Cellular normality (Superboy TV series)			Superboy		
Yellow		Action Comics #277 (June 1961)	Created by Luthor	Intimidation (Action Comics #277, June 1961) Unknown (Superman Family Adventures Vol. 12, August 2012) Fear (Lego DC Super Hero Girls)					Lego DC Super Hero Girls		Scribblenauts Unmasked
Silver		Superman's Pal, Jimmy Olsen #70 (July 1963)	Hoax by Jimmy Olsen Brainiac technology (Smallville, comics following Superman/Batman #46, April 2008)	Paranoid delusions					Smallville; Supergirl		Scribblenauts Unmasked
Jewel		Action Comics #310 (March 1964)	Kryptonian mountain fragments in Phantom Zone	Mind control powers					Smallville		
Magno-		Superman's Pal, Jimmy Olsen #92 (April 1966)	Created by Mr. Nero	Magnetic attraction							Scribblenauts Unmasked
Tar-based Black Harun-El		Superman III (1983) Comics: Supergirl (vol. 5) #2 (October 2005)	Synthesized with tar (Superman III) Superheated green (Smallville) Fragments of Krypton Kryptonian religion (Supergirl TV series)	Mental/physical manifestation of empowered evil self and weakened good self Reversion by additional exposure (Smallville/Supergirl TV series)	Same as on Kryptonians (Smallville/Supergirl TV series)		Superman III		Smallville; Supergirl	Justice League Action	Scribblenauts Unmasked
Krimson		Superman Volume 2 #49 (November 1990)	Created by Mister Mxyzptlk	One wish granted Reversion by disclosure of origin							
Kryptisium -X		The Adventures of Superman #511 (April 1994)	Green filtered by Eradicator	Excessive superpowers							Scribblenauts Unmasked
Pink		Supergirl (vol. 4) #79 (April 2003)		Inversion of gender-stereotyped traits Reversed sex (Justice League Action)						Justice League Action	
Purple		“Streaky's Supercat Tale,” Krypto (April 2005) Comics: Superman: The Kryptonite Spectrum #1 (2025)		Disordered thoughts and suggestibility	Same as on Kryptonians (Super-Pets)			DC League of Super-Pets		Krypto the Superdog DC Super Hero Girls	
Opal		Earth 2 #0 (November 2012)	Created by Mr. Terrific	Severe mental instability One use only							
Periwinkle		Superman Family Adventures #9 (March 2013)		Joy Transmutation to periwinkle color		Bizarro: anger (DC Super Hero Girls)				DC Super Hero Girls	
Turquoise		Dark Nights: Death Metal #3 (August 2020)	Dark Multiverse	Transformation into mythical creature							
Amber		Dark Knight: Death Metal - The Last 52: War of the Multiverses #1 (February 2021)	Dark multiverse	Loss of superpowers to human	Gain of superpowers from Kryptonian						
Cobalt		Superman: The Kryptonite Spectrum #2 (2025)		Size increase							
Speckled		Superman: The Kryptonite Spectrum (2025)		Size decrease							
Rainbow		Superman: The Kryptonite Spectrum #4 (November 2025)	Distress signal from Fifth Dimension	Transferral to Fifth Dimension							

== In vernacular ==
The term was being used independent of Superman by the 1960s, as a metaphor for a decisive weakness or vulnerability. Cambridge Dictionary defines the figurative use as "something that hurts or damages a person or thing that usually seems strong", Dictionary.com defines it as "something that a person or thing cannot defend against or defeat", and Collins defines it informally as "something that renders a person or thing helpless". Michael Pedler writes that "Superman's Kryptonite remains a kind of pop-cultural shorthand" for an "Achilles' heel".

Brian Holmes, Jeremy Bolen and Brian Kirkbride use the word in a different scholarly context in "Born Secret (Cash for Kryptonite): A field guide to the Anthropocene mode of production", an article on art, technology and political ecology that examines the Tennessee Valley, hydroelectric modernization and the Manhattan Project. The title uses the term "kryptonite" to represent hidden vulnerability, exposure and destructive technological power.

The term has seen usage in popular media. In music, kryptonite is often used metaphorically for dependence, loyalty or personal susceptibility. A prominent example is 3 Doors Down's 2000 single "Kryptonite"; songwriter Brad Arnold described the song as being "about friendship" and asking, "Will you just be there for me?" In wider film, television, sports and cultural commentary, the word is used as shorthand for a character flaw, a team's weakness or a system's point of failure; The Atlantic describes figurative use as "a moral weakness" or "a character flaw". The title of Craig Colasanti's 2018 indie crime thriller Kryptonights about an NYPD detective uses the fictional substance as a play on words.
