= Scribblenauts Unmasked: A DC Comics Adventure =

2013 puzzle sandbox video game

- Developers: 5th Cell; Shiver Entertainment (PS4, Xbox One, Switch)
- Publisher: Warner Bros. Interactive Entertainment
- Series: Scribblenauts
- Platforms: Wii U, Nintendo 3DS, Microsoft Windows, Nintendo Switch, PlayStation 4, Xbox One
- Release: Windows: NA: September 24, 2013; EU: September 24, 2013; Wii U, Nintendo 3DS: NA: September 24, 2013; AU: September 25, 2013; Switch, PS4, Xbox One: WW: September 18, 2018
- Genres: Puzzle, action
- Modes: Single-player, multiplayer

Scribblenauts Unmasked: A DC Comics Adventure is a 2013 puzzle sandbox video game developed by 5th Cell and published by Warner Bros. Interactive Entertainment for the Wii U, Nintendo 3DS and Microsoft Windows. It is the fifth game in the Scribblenauts series of games and the final to be developed by 5th Cell. The game combines the series' traditional gameplay of bringing up words and objects to solve puzzles with characters and settings from the DC Comics universe (DC Universe). In September 2018, Scribblenauts Unmasked and Scribblenauts Unlimited were re-released as part of Scribblenauts Mega Pack, with Unmasked receiving additional characters and levels.

== Gameplay ==
Following previous games in the series, players control a boy named Maxwell who has the ability to manifest any object or person using his magical notepad and modify them using adjectives. The game also has a "Hero Creator" that allows the player to create custom objects.

Players can visit a number of locations from the DC Universe, including the Batcave, Gotham City, Atlantis, Metropolis, the Fortress of Solitude, Central City, and Oa. Additionally, there are several optional levels that retell the origins of the Justice League's members.

Scribblenauts Unmasked features a system where the player can earn Reputation Points by completing missions and summoning new objects. Points can be used to unlock additional levels and costumes.

The Wii U version of Scribblenauts Unmasked features co-op multiplayer known as "Sidekick mode". In Sidekick mode, a second player can use their Wii Remote to control characters and objects.

== Plot ==
Maxwell and his twin sister Lily both have a passion for comics and often argue over which of their favorite characters would win in a fight. In order to find out for themselves they use Lily's magic globe (which allows the user to teleport anywhere they desire) combined with a page of Maxwell's notebook (which can bring to life whatever is written in it) to travel to the DC Comics universe. During the teleportation process, the globe is shattered; Maxwell and Lily land in Gotham City and the starites which power the globe are scattered throughout the universe. Batman finds the children in an alley and believes them to be criminals until Maxwell uses his notebook to aid Batman in a battle with Deadshot. Upon Maxwell and Lily gaining his trust, Batman learns about the starites and why the children need them and offers to help them find them. Batman then reveals that the Joker has been aided by someone who matches Maxwell's description.

Batman, Maxwell and Lily arrive to discover Joker's new ally is Maxwell's villainous counterpart Doppelganger, who is attempting to aid the villains in getting the starites for nefarious purposes. After Joker and Doppelganger are defeated, they teleport away before the police arrive. Commissioner James Gordon then reveals that he found the first starite and gives it to Maxwell. Batman grants Maxwell and Lily full access to the Batcave and alerts the rest of the Justice League about the situation at hand. With the first starite restored to the globe, Lily can now teleport Maxwell anywhere in the universe, but lacks the power to take them home. Maxwell is then sent to Metropolis after Superman provides news of a starite's presence.

Maxwell travels to Metropolis, Oa, Wayne Manor, Arkham Asylum, Joker's funhouse, the Fortress of Solitude, the Justice League Watchtower, Central City, Atlantis, and Themyscira to recover the starites. After Maxwell returns to the Watchtower, Cyborg reveals that the last starite is on an abandoned satellite belonging to the Injustice League. Upon teleporting to the satellite, Maxwell learns that Cyborg had been deceived and the satellite is a trap.

Maxwell, Lily, and the Justice League discover that Doppelgänger has formed an alliance with Brainiac, who steals Lily's globe and uses it to teleport the Justice League members away. Brainiac then reveals his plan to open a dimensional rift and combine with the other 51 versions of himself to destroy the multiverse. Feeling confused as he can no longer tell if Brainiac is his friend, Doppelgänger becomes reluctant to follow his orders. Realizing the source of Doppelgänger's evil was his lack of the feeling of friendship, Maxwell creates a twin sister for Doppelgänger (who resembles Lily) named "Doppelily", causing both to reform and side with Maxwell and Lily. Maxwell summons various parallel universe Justice Leaguers, who are immune to Brainiac's teleportation due to originating from another universe and manage to defeat the Brainiac collective. After obtaining the completed globe, Maxwell, Lily and Doppelily return to the Watchtower, taking an injured Doppelgänger with them.

After recovering from his injuries, Doppelgänger is scolded by the Justice League for his actions. With Doppelily's help, Doppelgänger vows to renounce evil and proves his intentions by undoing the damage he had done. Alfred Pennyworth, having grown fond of Maxwell, bids him and Lily farewell before they return to their universe.

=== Mega Pack ===
The Mega Pack re-release contains two additional missions where Maxwell obtains two more starites. In one of them, Maxwell pretends to be Doppelgänger at Belle Reve Penitentiary, so Amanda Waller forces him to aid the Suicide Squad in defeating Brimstone. In the other mission, Maxwell helps the Teen Titans defeat the Bizarro League and Trigon.

== Special Edition ==
A special edition of the game was sold exclusively at Walmart that included a DVD of the film Green Lantern: Emerald Knights as a bonus disc.

== Reception ==
Reception

Aggregate score
Aggregator	Score
Metacritic	3DS: 68/100; PC: 68/100; WiiU: 71/100

Review score
Publication	Score
GameZone	PC: 8/10

On Metacritic, the game holds a 68% approval rating across its PC and 3DS versions, whilst holding a 71% on its Wii U version, all indicating "mixed or average" reviews.

GameZone's Mike Splechta gave the PC version 8/10, stating that Unmasked had "a lot to offer, given its plethora of challenges and the equally impressive number of ways to solve them". IGN gave it a 9.1, saying it "is a super way to exercise your mind as well as your love of DC characters". Will Greenwald of PCMag gave the game 3.5 out of 5 stars, praising the addition of several DC characters and objects to create, though he criticized the absence of DC Vertigo characters, the weak goal-oriented gameplay, and stating that "it's a nerd sandbox for fans of the DC universe". In a review for Destructoid, the game was given a 7 out of 10 by Ian Bonds, noting the abundance and lack of content, calling it "not so heroic" with its "hard-to-ignore faults", though he cited the experience as "fun" and "solid", and also recommended players to get an audience while they play.

In a more mixed review on CBR.com by Steve Sunu, he states that the game is "ambitious" and "fun", but with its huge amount of content and a lacklustre execution, he called it "ultimately flawed". He also gave a mixed view about its puzzles, noting them as faithful to the DC Universe, but noted the backwards method of delivery for the puzzles, saying that "every other puzzle in the zone continuously switches out every time" and as a result, "there's no real way to measure progress". He also criticized the random encounters (though not from an NPC) that would revert the player's progress should it appear during a puzzle.
