= Superman and Lois Lane =

Fictional couple in DC Comics

- Art by Gary Frank

Publication information
- Publisher: DC Comics
- First appearance: Action Comics #1 (June 1938)
- Created by: Jerry Siegel; Joe Shuster

In-story information
- Full name: Superman/Clark Kent; Lois Lane
- Team affiliations: Daily Planet

Superman and Lois Lane are a fictional couple. Created by writer Jerry Siegel and artist Joe Shuster, both characters, including Superman's alter ego Clark Kent, first appeared in DC Comics' Action Comics #1 in 1938. They have remained in a complicated relationship ever since. A supercouple and the first superhero comic book romance, they are among the best-known fictional couples and have appeared in multiple media adaptations.

The characters' relationship was based for a long time in a love triangle in which Clark was interested in Lois who was smitten with the superhero Superman. Clark, unable to reveal to Lois that his mild-mannered demeanor was a ruse, was unable to compete for Lois's affection. The irony being he was his own rival in that Clark and Superman are, in fact, the same person. This love triangle and the dual identity were originally conceived in 1934. Following John Byrne's 1986 reboot, The Man of Steel, Clark's character became the more dominant personality of the Clark Kent/Superman character and more outgoing, aggressive, and assertive. This allowed a more natural romance to develop between Lois and Clark.

In the 1990s, Clark proposed marriage to Lois and revealed his identity as Superman to her. They began a long engagement, which was complicated by the death of Superman, a breakup, and several other problems. The couple married in Superman: The Wedding Album (December 1996). Clark and Lois's biological child in DC Comics canon was born in Convergence: Superman #2 (July 2015), a son named Jon Kent, who becomes Superboy.

Lois is the character most prominently featured with Superman; she appears in virtually all Superman comics and media adaptations and continues to be an essential part of the Superman mythos. Across decades of comics and other media adaptations, in some stories, Lois knows or suspects that Clark is Superman; sometimes this is explored for humour or plot development.

== Creation ==
The characters, Superman/Clark Kent and Lois Lane, were created by Jerry Siegel and Joe Shuster. Superman was conceived as the ideal Hollywood romantic hero of the time, portrayed in films by actors such as Douglas Fairbanks, Clark Gable, and Rudolph Valentino. Siegel and Shuster were both fans of silent film actor Douglas Fairbanks, his films The Mark of Zorro (1920), Robin Hood (1922), and The Black Pirate (1926) became a huge influence on their writing and art for Superman. The idea of making Superman an alien from another planet was inspired by Edgar Rice Burroughs' John Carter of Mars stories. Clark Kent's character grew out of Siegel and Shuster's own personal lives. Clark Kent's name is the combined names of actors Clark Gable and Kent Taylor. Clark Kent's demeanor was based on Harold Lloyd. Lois Lane was inspired by actress Glenda Farrell's portrayal of the fictional reporter Torchy Blane in a series of 1930s films. Siegel took her name from actress Lola Lane. Shuster based Lois Lane's physical appearance on a model named Joanne Carter. Carter later married Jerry Siegel in 1948.

If you're interested in what made Superman what it is, here's one of the keys to what made it universally acceptable. Joe and I had certain inhibitions... which led to wish-fulfillment which we expressed through our interest in science fiction and our comic strip. That's where the dual-identity concept came from, and Clark Kent's problems with Lois. I imagine there are a lot of people in this world who are similarly frustrated. Joe and I both felt that way in high school, and he was able to put the feeling into sketches. That's why I say it's a universal theme, and that's why so many people could relate to it.

— Siegel and Shuster on what made Superman continue to be popular over decades.

On the conception of Superman's dual identity, Siegel said in the 1983 Nemo magazine interview: "That occurred to me in late 1934, when I decided that I'd like to do Superman as a newspaper strip. I approached Joe about it, and he was enthusiastic about the possibility. I was up late one night, and more and more ideas kept coming to me, and I kept writing out several weeks of syndicate scripts for the proposed newspaper strip. When morning came, I had written several weeks of material, and I dashed over to Joe's place and showed it to him. [This was the story that appeared in Action Comics #1, June, 1938, the first published appearance of Superman.] You see, Clark Kent grew not only out of my private life but also out of Joe's. As a high school student, I thought that some day I might become a reporter, and I had crushes on several attractive girls who either didn't know I existed or didn't care I existed. As a matter of fact, some of them looked like they hoped I didn't exist. It occurred to me: What if I was real terrific? What if I had something special going for me, like jumping over buildings or throwing cars around or something like that? Then maybe they would notice me. That night when all the thoughts were coming to me, the concept came to me that Superman could have a dual identity and that in one of his identities he could be meek and mild, as I was, and wear glasses, the way I do. The heroine, who I figured would be a girl reporter, would think he was some sort of a worm, yet she would be crazy about this Superman character who could do all sorts of fabulous things. In fact, she was real wild about him, and a big inside joke was that the fellow she was crazy about was also the fellow whom she loathed. By coincidence, Joe was a carbon copy [of me]."

Siegel objected to any proposal that Lois discovers Clark Kent is Superman, as he felt that, as implausible as Clark's disguise is, the love triangle was too important to the stories appeal. Siegel stated: "If Lois should ACTUALLY learn Clark's secret, the strip would lose about 75% of its appeal—the human interest angle. I know that a formula can possibly prove monotonous through repetition but I fear that if this element is removed from the story formula that makes up SUPERMAN, that this strip will lose a great part of its effectiveness."

== Comics ==
=== 1938–1986 ===
Lois Lane meets Superman in Action Comics #1 (June 1938) art by Joe Shuster

Superman/Clark Kent and Lois Lane first appeared in Action Comics #1 (June 1938). Their first story together features a sequence in which Clark behaves cowardly, leaving Lois to defend herself against an aggressive man, from whom Superman later saves her. From then on, Clark was established as a shy man attracted to Lois, while she was interested in his heroic alter ego, Superman. This remained the status quo in the comics for decades.

Although Clark pursues Lois romantically, he does so while assuming a guise of abject cowardice that inevitably repulses Lois, and while rebuffing her own romantic overtures to his Superman identity. Noting this, and the way in which Clark laughs at Lois behind her back after he first learns she is in love with Superman, comics writer Michael Fleisher has described the underlying relationship between Lois and Clark during the Golden Age period as one of "mutual contempt", arguing that "Although Clark Kent rationalizes his need to play the coward on the ground that it helps him protect his secret identity, there is no way of easily rationalizing his openly stated desire to fool Lois into believing that she has him wrapped around her little finger."

As early as the 1940s, Lois began to suspect that Clark Kent was Superman; the first instance of this appears in Superman #17 (July–August 1942) in a story titled "Man or Superman" by Siegel and Shuster. Across decades of comics, Lois would suspect Clark is Superman and fruitlessly tries to prove it, with Superman always thwarting her. This theme became particularly pronounced in the 1950s and 1960s comics. In the Bronze Age of Comic Books, Lois became more of a heroic figure, more independent from Superman, and was less interested in his secret identity.

The first DC Comics story where Superman marries Lois Lane (not dreams, hoaxes or imaginary tales, but in DC canon) was in Action Comics #484 (June 1978). In this issue, celebrating Superman's 40th anniversary, The Wizard wanted to rid the world of Superman, however, he had no idea that Superman had a secret identity. Clark, with no memory of being Superman and therefore no need to pretend to be a coward, became fearless and bold, thus becoming attractive to Lois Lane—proving that it was more about attitude and personality than superpowers that attracted her to Superman. Lois and the new Clark began dating and fell in love. Eventually, he proposed, and the couple got married. On their honeymoon, when Lois saw Clark caught in a crossfire that should have killed him but left no mark on him, she began to suspect he was really Superman. To further prove this, Lois tried to cut a lock of his hair, and the scissors she used broke. As much as she loved the new Clark with no memory of being Superman, Lois knew that the world needed Superman, and found The Wizard, who had cast the spell, and made him reverse it. Clark remembered he was Superman, but also his marriage to Lois. He then took Lois to the Fortress of Solitude and married her again in a Kryptonian ceremony as Superman. From that point on, Lois and Clark/Superman of the alternate universe known as Earth-Two remained married in DC Comics. This version of the character stars in The Superman Family comic book in the series Mr and Mrs Superman, which features the adventures of the Earth-Two Superman and his wife, Lois Lane Kent. The couple later appeared in the 2005 Infinite Crisis limited series.

In the main DC universe, however, things stayed the same, with Lois still not being allowed to discover Superman's dual identity. She loved Superman, but he said he belonged to the world and could not commit to anyone. In 1985, the DC universe went through a revamp with the Crisis on Infinite Earths limited series. The purpose of the year-long event was to get rid of some character histories, conflicting continuity, and overlapping worlds.

In the 1986 two-part story Whatever Happened to the Man of Tomorrow? by Alan Moore and Curt Swan, that told the final tale of Superman (which was being rebooted following the events of Crisis on Infinite Earths, before his modern introduction in the John Byrne series). The story is a frame story, set ten years after Superman was last seen, where Lois Lane recounts the end of Superman's career to a reporter. The story includes numerous attacks against Superman by his enemies, the public revelation of his secret identity as Clark Kent, and a number of deaths of his friends. At the end of the story, it is revealed that Lois' husband, the car mechanic Jordan Elliot, is Superman. He is without powers and lives as an ordinary man with Lois and their son Jonathan. The final image is of Jordan delivering a classic Superman wink to the reader, as he and Lois continue to "live happily ever after". The story was designed to honor the long history of the Superman character and serves as a complete conclusion to his mythology.

=== 1986–2011 ===
The wedding of Superman/Clark Kent and Lois Lane in 1996

Following Crisis on Infinite Earths, DC Comics released the six-issue limited series The Man of Steel by John Byrne, which told the story of Superman's modern origin. Superman was now never Superboy in his youth, with Clark Kent becoming the real person and Superman the disguise. With this retelling, there was now a setting in which Lois could logically fall in love with Clark Kent, as he was the real person this time. Even with this, however, it would take years for Lois to have romantic feelings for Clark after he scooped her on the exclusive Superman story.

In Superman #44 (June 1990), the couple made peace, began dating, and fell in love. In Superman #50 (December 1990), Clark proposes to Lois, and she accepts. Clark did not tell Lois his identity as Superman until weeks later in Action Comics #662 (February 1991). After contemplating the revelation and its implications, Lois decides it all comes down to love. She loves Clark and wants to spend the rest of her life with him.

Due to the then-upcoming television series Lois & Clark: The New Adventures of Superman, a chain of events were put into motion to prevent Clark and Lois in the comics from getting married until their television counterparts did. Superman was killed by Doomsday in Superman #75 (January 1993). After a year of mourning, searching and resurrecting in The Death and Return of Superman storyline, Superman returned to the land of the living and the arms of Lois Lane. When Clark and Lois on the television series married in October 1996, their comic book counterpart did as well, in the special Superman: The Wedding Album (December 1996).

In the 2006 story arc Last Son, the couple adopted a boy, the biological son of Kryptonian villains General Zod and Ursa, and named him Chris Kent. Although Clark is quick to embrace parenthood, Lois is more reluctant until she sees how vulnerable and sweet Chris is, and the three of them become a happy family. When Zod invades Earth, during the battle, Chris, along with his birth parents are sucked into the Phantom Zone, leaving Clark and Lois without their son and heartbroken. Chris later returned as a teenager under the guise of Nightwing.

In the 2009 Superman: Secret Origin, a six-part miniseries by Geoff Johns and Gary Frank that detailed Superman's new origin story (replacing Mark Waid's 2003 limited series Superman: Birthright) in the post-Infinite Crisis DC Universe, Lois becomes Clark's mentor when he begins his employment at the Daily Planet. The paper had been in financial trouble since Lex Luthor controls nearly every media outlet in Metropolis, with the Daily Planet being the only major newspaper that directly attacks him. In Superman's first public appearance, he saves Lois when she falls off the LexCorp building. Understanding the flying hero's benevolence, Lois writes a positive article on him, which boosts the Daily Planet's sales 700%. Eventually, Luthor becomes involved with General Sam Lane, Lois' father, so that they can defeat Superman, believing him to be an alien threat. Superman defeats Metallo, a U.S. soldier converted into a cyborg, and public opinion turns in Superman's favor. In the aftermath, Clark and Lois become friendly rivals, while Superman and Lois begin to develop mutual romantic feelings.

=== 2011–present ===
Superman, Lois, and their son Jonathan in Superman vol. 4 #2 art by Patrick Gleason

In 2011, DC Comics rebooted its continuity with the New 52 relaunch. In the relaunch, Lois views Clark as a friend and respects him as a journalist, but regards him as a loner who has difficulty letting people get close to him and displays no existing knowledge of his dual identity. Superman Unchained, a nine-issue series by Scott Snyder and Jim Lee, explores Clark's connection with Lois in the New 52.

Released in April 2015, the miniseries Convergence features a post-Crisis version of a married Superman and Lois Lane. The couple is expecting the impending birth of their child, and Superman has to protect the city after it was taken out of time by a powerful alternate version of Brainiac. Convergence shows the birth of their son, Jon Kent, Clark and Lois' biological child in DC Comics canon.

Following Convergence, DC announced a spin-off comic book series Superman: Lois and Clark. The eight-issue series debuting in October 2015 by Dan Jurgens and Lee Weeks is set several years after Convergence. The series focuses on Clark and Lois' relationship and their son Jon, living in the New 52 universe, with Clark and Lois operating undercover, Superman discreetly helping out in a black variant of his suit, and Lois writing exposés under the name 'Author X'.

In June 2016, DC relaunched its entire line of comic book titles with DC Rebirth. DC re-established Lois and Clark's relationship and marriage in DC continuity, along with their son, Jonathan, who eventually became the newest Superboy in DC Comics.

The story arc Superman Reborn smooths over the discrepancies between the two versions of Superman and Lois Lane. According to Mister Mxyzptlk, the creation of the New 52 caused Superman and Lois to be separated into two people: the New 52 characters that served as the protagonists of the Superman books in 2011-2015 and the post-Crisis characters that took part in the Convergence event and had their son, Jonathan. Mxyzptlk provides a meta-reference to their relationship and says he could not keep Superman and Lois apart when DC Comics could not; referencing the negative reactions from fans when DC dissolved their relationship at the beginning of the New 52. Thanks to Jonathan, the New 52 and post-Crisis counterparts of Superman and Lois merge into complete versions of themselves, rearranging their shared histories and accommodating them into the restored DC Universe.

== Radio ==
Aired from 1940 to 1951, the long-running radio serial The Adventures of Superman starring the DC Comics character Superman; for the bulk of the series run, Bud Collyer voiced Superman/Clark Kent, and Joan Alexander voiced Lois Lane.

== Animations ==
=== Fleischer Superman cartoons ===
The first animated appearance of Superman was released in Technicolor by Paramount Pictures in a series of animated short films. They are collectively known as "The Fleischer Superman cartoons". A total of seventeen films were produced from 1941 to 1943. Fleischer Studios produced the first nine animated shorts and Famous Studios produced the final eight. Superman, the first animated short was nominated for an Academy Award in 1942, and was voted #33 of the 50 Greatest Cartoons of all time. Bud Collyer voiced Superman/Clark Kent and Joan Alexander voiced Lois Lane.

=== Superman: The Animated Series ===
Superman and Lois in Superman: The Animated Series voiced by Tim Daly and Dana Delany

Superman: The Animated Series aired on Kids' WB from September 1996 to February 2000. Tim Daly voiced Superman/Clark Kent, and Dana Delany voiced Lois Lane.

When developing the series, the producers made the decision to establish Lois as a character much more grounded in her Golden Age roots; a sharp, aggressive, and career-minded reporter who was not afraid to dig deep into the Metropolis dirt to gain a story, with Clark Kent as the voice of caution and reason in his alter-ego, and as the well-meaning "boy scout" in his role as Superman.

In the series, already accustomed to a world filled with madmen, Superman's heroics in Metropolis do not impress Lois initially. She also carries a professional rivalry with his alter-ego, Clark Kent. Lois is severely territorial over her stories, and constantly teases Clark by calling him "Smallville" (a line adapted in the comics and the Smallville television series.)

Following a trip to an alternate universe in "Brave New Metropolis", Lois is surprised and dismayed to find Superman has sold out to Lex Luthor after her alternate self-was killed; this leads her to realize she meant much more to Superman than she initially thought. After this version of Superman saved the world from Lex Luthor's dominion, Lois kissed him before returning to her own reality, becoming much closer to Superman afterward, aware of how delicate his feelings are. Lois also became more affectionate to Clark as the series progressed, confiding in him as a friend, though their rivalry at times became more heated on a personal basis due to this. In the three-part episode "World's Finest", Bruce Wayne arrives in Metropolis and begins a relationship with Lois. Lois considered moving to Gotham City, much to Clark's dismay. Lois eventually learned that Bruce Wayne was the Gotham City vigilante Batman, however, and ended the relationship.

In "The Late Mr. Kent", Clark is forced to fake his death in order to sniff out an assassin who has targeted his alter-ego. Unaware of his survival, Lois takes the loss of her partner hard and becomes consumed with uncovering the truth behind his murder, enlisting Superman's help. Whilst investigating Clark's apartment, Lois breaks down, admitting to Superman that she respected and really liked Clark, but never told him. Lois and Superman continued to have a friendly, yet distanced relationship, neither really taking the first step until the events of the series finale "Legacy". In "Legacy", Superman is briefly turned against the world by Darkseid. After overcoming the threat of Apokolips yet again, Superman admits to Lois that it will take him a long time to restore humanity's faith in him; but Lois assures him he's already got one less human to worry about, kissing him. In the animated series Justice League Unlimited (Superman voiced by George Newbern), the two continued to date while Lois maintained a more amiable relationship with Clark.

=== My Adventures with Superman ===
Lois and Superman in the animated series My Adventures with Superman voiced by Alice Lee and Jack Quaid

Jack Quaid and Alice Lee voice Superman/Clark Kent and Lois Lane in the animated series My Adventures with Superman, which premiered on Adult Swim in July 2023.

The series follows the adventures of Clark, Lois and Jimmy Olsen as an investigative reporting team at the Daily Planet. It features a young Clark Kent, new to his powers, as he builds his secret Superman identity and embraces his role as the hero of Metropolis and the world, and Lois as a star investigative journalist.

== Films ==
=== 1940s and 1950s Superman films ===
The first live-action appearance of Superman on film is the 1948 Columbia Pictures film serial Superman. The fifteen part black-and-white film stars Kirk Alyn as Superman/Clark Kent and Noel Neill as Lois Lane. Both actors returned in Columbia's second live-action Superman film, Atom Man vs. Superman (1950).

In the 1951 independent film, Superman and the Mole Men, Superman/Clark Kent was played by George Reeves and Phyllis Coates as Lois Lane.

=== Christopher Reeve Superman films ===
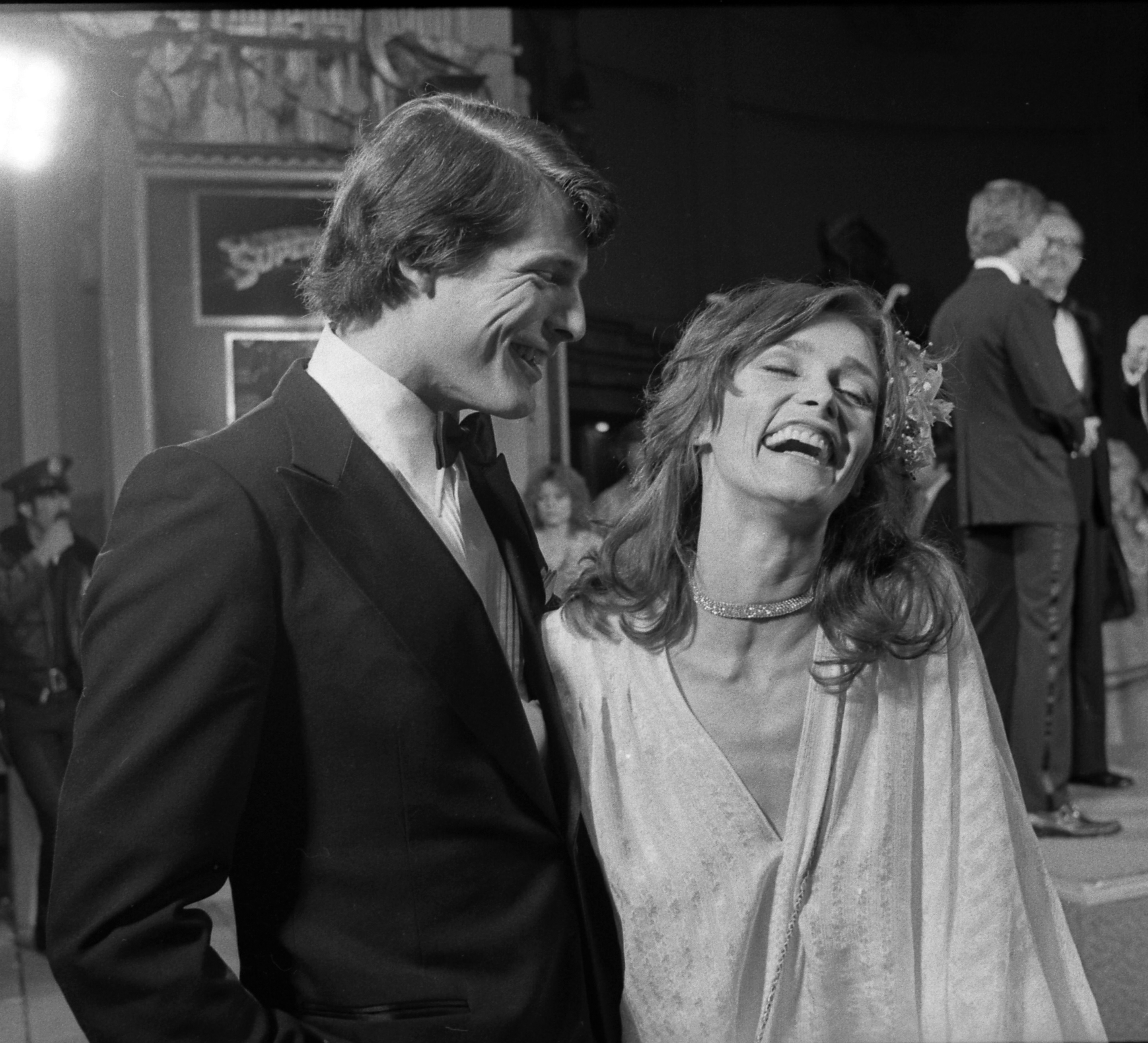
Christopher Reeve and Margot Kidder at the Superman film premiere in 1978

The film Superman was released by Warner Bros. in 1978, based on the DC Comics character. Christopher Reeve portrayed Superman/Clark Kent, with Margot Kidder as Lois Lane. Directed by Richard Donner with music by John Williams, the film led to three theatrical sequels, Superman II (1980), Superman III (1983) and Superman IV: The Quest For Peace (1987). In 2006, Superman II: The Richard Donner Cut was released on DVD, featuring director Richard Donner's original vision for Superman II.

One of the most important aspects of the first and second films was the romantic relationship between the two main characters; Clark was hopelessly in love with Lois and, in Superman II, even gave up his powers to be with her.

The relationship between Superman/Clark Kent and Lois Lane develops and grows over the first two films. In Superman, Lois meets Clark when he begins working at the Daily Planet newspaper. She is then introduced to his Superman persona later, when he rescues her from a helicopter accident. Lois quickly becomes enamoured with Superman, accepting his offer to be interviewed for the newspaper. During the interview, she learns about Superman's homeworld, and his abilities, with Superman flying her in the sky over Metropolis. Lois later dies in an earthquake caused by Lex Luthor sending a missile to California in the climax of the first film. Superman, distraught by her death, flies around the globe at supernatural speed, breaking the warning of his father, Jor-El, to not interfere with human history. This allows him to travel back in time and stop the destruction caused by the missile, saving Lois.

In Superman II, Lois becomes suspicious of Clark, discovering his identity after he is unscathed from falling directly into a fire pit in their hotel. Clark then tells Lois more about himself, flying her to the Fortress of Solitude and revealing that he loves her. Wanting to spend his life with Lois, Clark uses a Kryptonian device to alter his DNA, making him human. Soon after, Clark and Lois learn that three Kryptonians have arrived on Earth and is threatening humanity. Clark decides to restore his powers and defeats the Kryptonians. Later, Clark finds Lois upset about knowing his secret and not being able to be open about her true feelings. Clark kisses Lois, using his abilities to wipe her mind of her knowledge of the past few days.

In Superman III, Clark's childhood friend in Smallville, Lana Lang, became his new love interest. In the fourth and final film, Superman IV: The Quest for Peace, Lois returns as Clark/Superman's love.

=== Superman Returns ===
The 2006 film Superman Returns serves as a homage sequel to the motion pictures Superman (1978) and Superman II (1980). Brandon Routh played the role of Superman/Clark Kent and Kate Bosworth played Lois Lane.

In the film, Superman returns to Earth after five years travelling in space to investigate what he believed to be his home planet Krypton. Upon returning to Metropolis as his alter-ego reporter Clark Kent, he is shocked to discover the consequences of his disappearance. In his absence, his love, Lois Lane, a fellow journalist at the Daily Planet, is engaged to Richard White, the nephew of editor-in-chief Perry White, and has a young son, Jason, with Richard. The criminal mastermind Lex Luthor was released from prison because Superman did not testify against Luthor during his appeal trial. After seducing an old heiress, Luthor inherits her fortune and begins his plot against Superman.

Superman reemerges to the world when he saves a space shuttle test launch during a mysterious nationwide power outage, triggered by Luthor using Kryptonian technology. Lois investigates the power outage, tracks the source to a mansion owned by Luthor, and, along with her son, is held captive on a superyacht heading into the Atlantic Ocean. Luthor plans to use the Kryptonian crystal, stolen from the Fortress of Solitude, to create a new land mass, which, in turn, will destroy the United States.

Aboard the yacht, Lois manages to send a message for help through the fax machine to the Daily Planet, the message being received by Richard and Clark. However, one of Luthor's henchmen catches her and attempts to attack her, causing Jason's superpowers to emerge as he crushed the henchman with a piano. This reveals that Jason is, in fact, Superman's son. Luthor and his men escape by helicopter. While Superman works to contain the damage in the city, Richard reaches the yacht with a small plane. When the boat starts to sink, the three of them become trapped, and Lois is knocked unconscious. Superman rescues them in time and takes them to Richard's plane for safety. Superman pursues Luthor, who has made his way to the new landmass infused with kryptonite. Luthor easily defeats Superman, stabbing him with a kryptonite shard and leaving him to drown in the sea. Regaining consciousness, Lois, knowing of the kryptonite danger, convinces Richard to turn the plane around. They spot Superman in the water and takes him into the plane, where Lois removes the kryptonite shard. Recovered, Superman flies the landmass into out space.

Complications from kryptonite exposure cause Superman to fall into a coma. Lois visits him in the hospital and whispers in his ear concerning Jason's paternity. Soon after, Superman visits Jason and repeats the words of his own father as Jason sleeps. Lois starts to write an article titled "Why the World Needs Superman".

=== DC Extended Universe ===
==== Man of Steel ====
In 2013, Warner Bros. released Man of Steel, directed by Zack Snyder and produced by Christopher Nolan, to serve as first film in the DC Extended Universe. Henry Cavill stars in the title role as Superman/Clark Kent, with Amy Adams as Lois Lane.

In Man of Steel, unlike in previous adaptations, Lois was made aware of Clark's identity as Superman early on in the film. The traditional love triangle between Clark Kent, Lois Lane, and Superman was removed; this was part of an effort to reinvent Superman in the modern world. Warner Bros. initially questioned the decision, but screenwriter David S. Goyer insisted that Lois should know Clark's secret as Superman, as they were trying to depict Superman in a more realistic, more relatable way. Goyer said sidestepping the alter ego problem was not an issue with Lois.

Director Zack Snyder said Lois needed to be a match for Superman, a girl who intrigues him. Snyder described Superman as "falling in love" with the reporter, saying that affirming the bond between Clark and Lois was a vital part of the film. Producer Deborah Snyder said while Lois and Superman immediately click, their upbringings were on opposite ends of a cultural gulf that make their romance like the pairing of a country mouse with a city mouse. "The fact that he picks Lois makes him better. Because Lois is not the obvious choice. She's difficult, she's sophisticated, she's from the city, she's all the things that he's not. They make a really interesting couple, but a complicated couple," Deborah explained. Deborah also stated that although Superman saves Lois physically, she saves him emotionally.

Amy Adams saw a lot to like about Lois's straightforward approachability, a quality that would appeal to a Kansas farm boy. "I think there was a great juxtaposition between this sort of Man of Steel and woman of Earth," Adams said. Henry Cavill said it was essential for Lois to know Clark's secret, and that she saves him just as much as he saves her. "I think the interaction between Lois and Superman is that she is obviously Superwoman, in a societal sense. And then she's finally found this one guy who can literally sweep her off her feet," Cavill said. Cavill also noted: "What is between Clark and Lois is a very personal thing. He opens her eyes to a world she didn't know existed and she opens his eyes to the idea of what he sees as a more normal existence."

In the film, Lois first meets Superman in the Arctic while writing a story about a scientific discovery of an unidentified object found in the Arctic ice. There, Lois follows Superman to the buried Kryptonian scout ship and becomes aware of his abilities, with Superman saving and healing her after she is attacked by a Kryptonian drone. Over the next several weeks, Lois begins to search for Superman's identity, by tracking down his activities in the past few years. Lois eventually arrives in his hometown Smallville, and speaks with his mother, Martha Kent. Clark and Lois meet again in the Smallville cemetery. After revealing to Lois his identity and speaking about father's death, Lois decides to keep Clark's identity a secret.

When General Zod arrives on Earth and demands the humans to surrender Kal-El (Clark), Lois is arrested by the FBI, on the belief she knows the identity of Kal-El. Clark agrees to hand himself into the government in exchange for Lois's freedom. Later, both Clark and Lois are taken to General Zod's ship, and are interrogated by Zod's forces. Clark manages to defeat Zod's forces with the help of both Lois and Jor-El. At the battle of Metropolis, Clark kisses Lois before Zod arrives and attacks him. Clark ultimately ended the fight by killing Zod; when Lois arrives afterward, she consoles him. Some time afterward, Clark decides to join the Daily Planet and is introduced to Lois as a new stringer, and Lois plays along with his new secret identity.

==== Batman v Superman: Dawn of Justice ====
Amy Adams and Henry Cavill reprise their roles in Batman v Superman: Dawn of Justice (2016). Clark and Lois are now dating and living together. Lois' connection to Superman has prompted some to use her against the Kryptonian hero, with Lex Luthor initiating his plan against Superman by arranging for Lois to be abducted by insurgents and threatened so that Superman's intervention would create a potential international incident. However, Clark's love for her also prompts him to regain faith in himself after failing to stop a bomb plot by Luthor, and ultimately convinces him to sacrifice himself to kill Doomsday and likely save the world, as his last words are "you are my world". At the end of the film, after Superman's death, Martha gives Lois an engagement ring which Clark originally planned to give her.

==== Justice League ====
Henry Cavill and Amy Adams reprise their roles in Justice League (2017). When asked about what role Lois Lane fulfills for Superman, Cavill stated that: "I think Lois was, and is, a true anchor for Superman, and she always has been."

Lois is still grieving over Clark's death and is writing fluff pieces for the Daily Planet. Batman and his allies use a Mother Box to resurrect Superman to help them fight off Steppenwolf. Superman is successfully resurrected, however, his memories have not returned and he attacks the League. Lois becomes Batman's secret contingency plan and helps calm Superman down. Clark leaves with Lois to his family home in Smallville where he tries to recover his memories. Clark and Lois reaffirm their love for each other before Superman join the battle against Steppenwolf.

In Zack Snyder's 2021 director's cut of Justice League, Lois has stopped coming into her job at the Daily Planet due to her grief, and visits Superman's monument in Heroes Park regularly until Martian Manhunter (posing as Martha Kent) convinces her to return to work. After visiting the monument one last time, she witnesses Clark's revival and runs to him as he battles the other heroes. Lois is revealed to be pregnant with Clark's child, and Superman, who could sense her pregnancy, was calmed by it during the fight with the other heroes. The "Snyder Cut" and Batman v Superman both allude to a dark future timeline in which Darkseid takes over the world and enslaves Superman with the Anti-Life Equation after killing Lois.

=== DC Universe ===
==== Superman ====
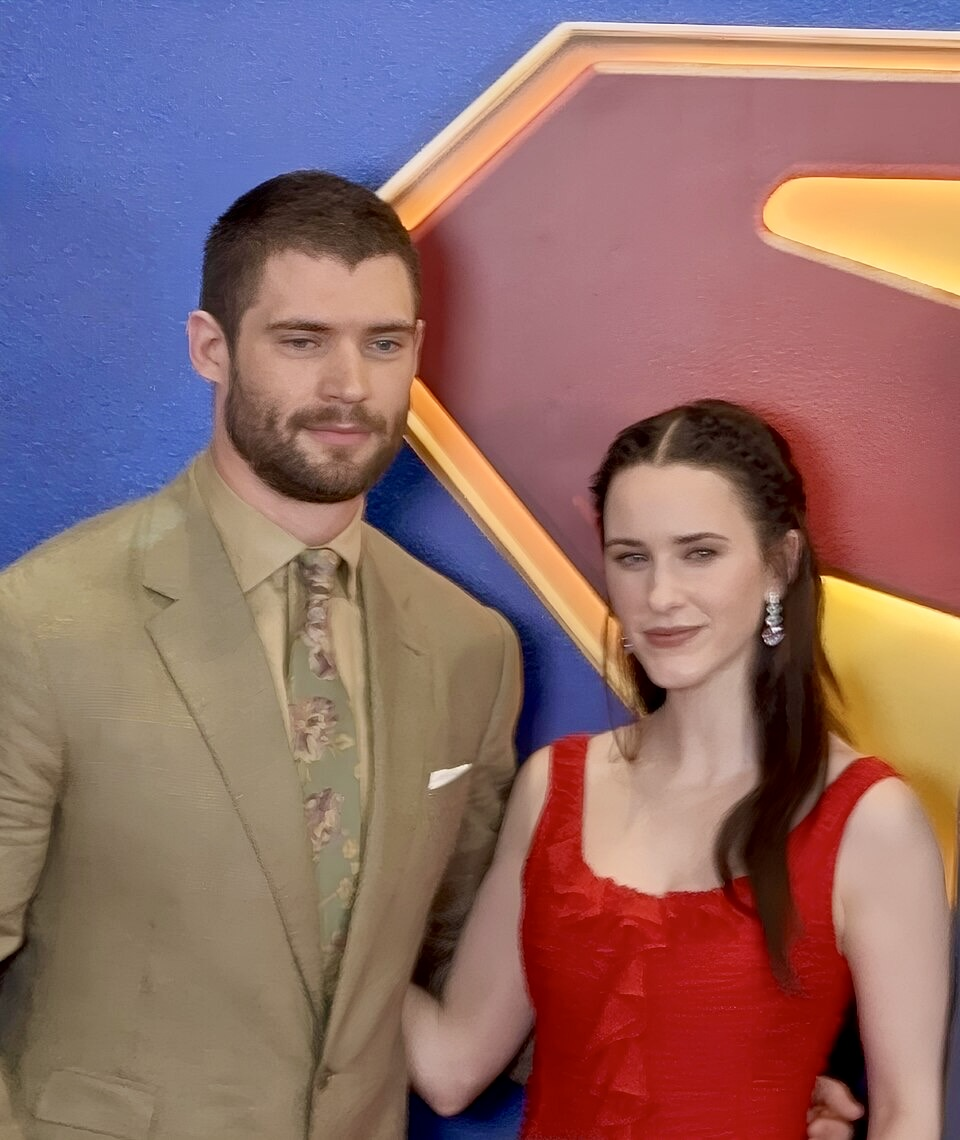
David Corenswet and Rachel Brosnahan at the premiere of Superman (2025)

David Corenswet and Rachel Brosnahan played Clark Kent/Superman and Lois Lane in the DC Universe film Superman (2025). In this version, Clark and Lois are already dating, with Lois already knowing Superman's identinty. After Superman's battle with the Hammer of Boravia, Lois decided to interview Superman about his actions on stopping the conflict between Boravia and Jarhanpur without the authority of the United States Government. Clark defends his actions as life-saving. He cuts the interview short, and as Lois laments that their relationship was doomed, and Clark walked out from their apartment. After Lex Luthor infiltrated the Fortress of Solitude and recovered half of the damaged message of Superman's parents, revealing that Superman was sent to conquer humanity. Lois saw the reveal on the Daily Planet office.

After an angry Superman stormed into Luthor's office asking about Krypto further escalating his tarnished reputation. Later that night, Lois awaited him and asked about Krypto. Clarifying that he was only dog-sitting him, Superman apologized for the argument during their earlier interview, and Lois did the same — believing they were bound to fight considering their differences. She described herself as a mere punk rock kid, while Superman, a fan of pop radio bands like The Mighty Crabjoys, insisted that he is one too. She continued, stating that Superman is prone to trust people and sees their beauty unlike her, a trait he called "the real punk rock." When Lois struggled to explain why she claimed their relationship was doomed, Superman stood up and revealed his plan to surrender himself in order to discover where Krypto was being held. The two shared a quiet embrace.

Willing to save Clark and clear his name, Lois asks the help of the Justice Gang, a team of corporate heroes, consisting by Guy Gardner, Hawkgirl and Mister Terrific, to help him free Superman, but they refuse since they didn't want to escalate a conflict between them and the U.S. Government. However, Mister Terrific decided to help Lois and they flew to Fort Kramer where Superman was last seen. After arriving at the camp, they discovered that Luthor had built a Pocket Universe. After Superman and Krypto were rescued by Metamorpho, Lois, Clark and Krypto escaped using Mister Terrific's T-Craft and flew to Smallville for Clark to recover.

After discovering the conspiracy between Luthor and the Boravian president Vasil Ghurkos from Luthor's ex-girlfriend, Eve Teschmacher, and Jimmy Olsen, Lois and the Daily Planet crew exposed Luthor's scheme. Meanwhile, Superman, Krypto and Mister Terrific stopped Luthor from using his Pocket Dimension portal to create a rift to destroy Metropolis. After Luthor's arrest, Superman reunited with Lois and jokingly offered her an "interview," promising to share all the behind-the-scenes details. He followed her into a mall, where the two embraced and kissed passionately. As they floated into the air, Lane finally told him she loved him too, bringing a warm smile to Superman's face.

==== Man of Tomorrow ====
Superman and Lois Lane is set to appear in the DCU film Man of Tomorrow (2027), with Corenswet and Brosnahan reprising the role.

== Television series ==
=== Adventures of Superman ===
Adventures of Superman is an American television series in the 1950s. The show is the first live-action television series to feature the comic book character Superman and began filming in 1951. Sponsored by the cereal company Kellogg's, the series ran from September 1952 to April 1958 and starring George Reeves as Clark Kent/Superman and Phyllis Coates as Lois Lane in the first season. Noel Neill played Lois from seasons two to season six opposite Reeves.

The series follows Superman as he battles crooks, gangsters, and other villains in the city of Metropolis while masquerading as the Daily Planet reporter Clark Kent. Lois Lane and Jimmy Olsen, Clark's colleagues at the office, often find themselves in dangerous situations which can only be resolved with Superman's timely intervention.

=== Lois & Clark: The New Adventures of Superman ===
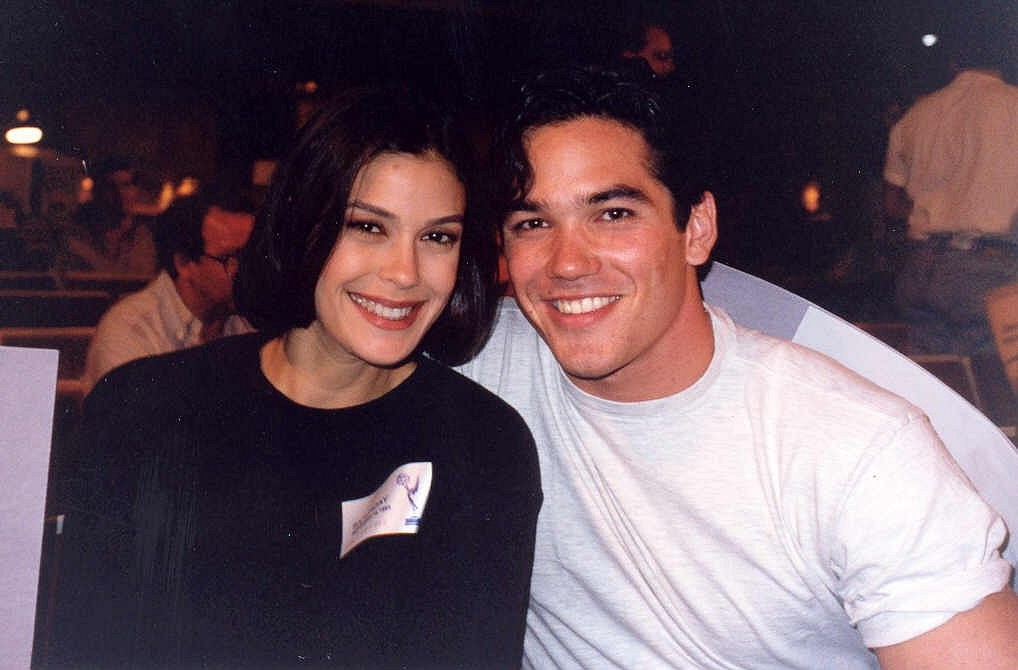
Teri Hatcher and Dean Cain

Lois & Clark: The New Adventures of Superman is a live-action television series in the 1990s, based on the comic book character Superman. The series takes us from the moment Clark Kent/Superman arrives in Metropolis and applies for a job at the Daily Planet, to his first meeting with Lois Lane, through to their romantic relationship and eventual marriage.

The series ran from 1993 to 1997 and stars Dean Cain as Superman/Clark Kent and Teri Hatcher as Lois Lane. The show loosely followed John Byrne's six-issue comic book series, The Man of Steel, which significantly rewrote Superman's origin, with Clark Kent as the true personality and Superman a disguise. The main characteristic of this series is that it gave special focus on the relationship between Clark and Lois.

In the series, Jonathan and Martha Kent witness the crash-landing of a small spaceship in Shuster's Field near Smallville, Kansas in 1966. When they investigate the craft, they discover the baby Kal-El and decide to raise him as their own, naming him Clark Jerome Kent. 27 years later, Clark moves to Metropolis and gets a job at the Daily Planet. There, he is partnered with Lois Lane, who at first considers him little more than a pest. Eventually, the two fall in love and marry, after a turbulent courtship: including Lois being kidnapped by Lex Luthor and replaced with a frog eating clone, Lois suffering from amnesia, and Clark being called away to serve as a leader on New Krypton. Clark and Lois finally get married in the episode "Swear to God, This Time We're Not Kidding." Their marriage on the television series was timed to coincide with the release of the comic book special Superman: The Wedding Album, which depicts the couple's wedding in DC Comics.

=== Smallville ===
The television series Smallville aired from 2001 to 2011, began with a teenage Clark Kent (Tom Welling) learning to balance the demands of his powers with his desire to lead a normal life. Lois Lane (Erica Durance) was introduced as Chloe Sullivan's cousin in the fourth season. Clark and Lois first develop a friendship, and in the later seasons, a romantic relationship with Clark gradually falls in love with Lois and eventually reveals his alien origin to her. From the moment Lois was introduced to the series, Clark and Lois's future romance was foreshadowed throughout the series, including Lois revealing that a fortune teller once told her that she was destined to fall for a guy who flies a lot and likes to wear tights, or saying she prefers geeks in glasses. And numerous other hints and comments made by Clark or Lois and other characters on the show.

Lois appears in the season 4 premiere episode "Crusade". Her character was initially only allowed to appear on the show for four episodes, with her appearances eventually expanded to twelve episodes. Comic book writer and Smallville producer Jeph Loeb revealed that the showrunners wanted Clark and Lois to have a 1930s banter similar to Katharine Hepburn and Cary Grant.

In season 5, series producer Darren Swimmer describes the relationship between Clark and Lois in the fifth season as "a bit of a melting of the ice". The two characters continue to "butt heads", but the audience can see where there is a growing attraction and that either would be there for the other in a time of need. Durance feels that in season five it is not yet clear if either character realizes the attraction, but the joking between the two characters represents a foreshadowing of a greater relationship. Durance sees season five as being too soon for the characters to be "in-love" because they are still getting to know each other.

In season 6, the relationship between Clark and Lois is still undefined for the audience. Durance described the relationship between Clark and Lois in season six as something neither character wanted to put an official label on. The pair has learned to deal with each other's "quirks", but there are still moments that both feel uncomfortable with. Durance believes that Clark and Lois are satisfied with identifying with a "brother-sister friendship" label, rather than trying to discover how they both truly feel about each other. Writer Brian Peterson describes Lois's relationship with Oliver Queen in season six as a precursor to her future relationship with Clark. Peterson sees the dynamic between Lois and Oliver—with Lois willingness to accept Oliver's secret identity as Green Arrow—mirroring the relationship Lois will have with Clark. In the episode "Hydro", Clark and Lois share their first kiss. However, Lois was unaware that she was kissing Clark, as he was disguising himself as Green Arrow (Oliver, Lois's boyfriend at the time). In the episode "Crimson", Clark is infected by Red Kryptonite (which in the series removes his inhibitions) Clark's action, behavior and his conversation with his mother, shows that he was attracted to Lois at some level.

In season 7, Clark and Lois made a huge progression in their relationship. In the episode "Siren", Lois (after breaking up with Oliver Queen) in an emotionally vulnerable state told Clark that she knows what it's like to love someone who has a destiny greater than her own. In the episode "Apocalypse", Jor-El sent Clark to an alternate reality where Clark never came to Earth, and Lois meeting Clark Kent for the first time at the Daily Planet and the two character have an instant attraction to each other. And Clark exposing his powers to save Lois's life and working with her to stop president Lex Luthor's plans for world domination.

In season 8, Clark and Lois took another crucial step towards their relationship, with Clark start to work at the Daily Planet working alongside Lois. The writers for the series stated that in season eight, Lois finds out about her true feelings towards Clark. Durance describes season eight as a lesson in duality, with Clark realizing that he has to be two different people if he wants to have a life and save the day. Durance believes that the same applies to Lois. Durance explains, "[Lois has] got her confidence as a journalist and on the inside, she's going oh my god I'm truly in love with [Clark], more in love than I've ever been with anyone." In the episode "Instinct", Maxima, an alien princess who came to Earth to seek a suitable mate, chose Clark. When Lois broke Maxima's spell over Clark, Maxima confronts Lois; saying that Clark's attraction to Lois and the bond between them was the only way that Clark was able to resist her spell. In the episode "Committed", Lois was put under a lie detector test by a serial killer and admitted that she was in love with Clark. In the episode "Bride", the two shared many moments of attraction towards each other and almost sharing a kiss, but was interrupted by the return of Lana. At the end of the season, Lois was sent to the future. Clark believing Lois was killed in Doomsday's attack on the city (this and the death of Jimmy Olsen) leads him to leave behind his human identity and fully embrace only his Kryptonian side.

In season 9, Lois returns to the present in the episode "Savior" but has lost her memory of when and where she has been. Lois's reappearance breaks Clark's self-imposed exile, prompting him to return to the Daily Planet. Soon, the two were seen flirting much more. In the first nine episodes, Lois is seen having dreams and visions of the future, which includes her and Clark making love. In the episode "Crossfire", Clark finally shows his true feeling for Lois and kissed her, which Lois reciprocated in the episode "Idol". In the episode "Pandora", the truth of what Lois saw in her visions is revealed. At the end of the episode, Clark and Lois decide to become an official couple. Throughout the rest of season nine, the two took slow steps in their relationship because both want this relationship to be the one they "got right". In the season finale episode "Salvation", as the Blur, Clark kissed Lois and she discovers his secret as the superhero vigilante, the Blur. It is made clear in the season ten premiere episode "Lazarus" Clark doesn't realize that Lois knows his secret.

In season 10, several new milestones occurred in their relationship; from "I love you" exchanged, Clark revealing his secret as the Blur to Lois, to them consummating their love. In the episode "Ambush", it is implied that Clark asked Sam Lane for her hand in marriage. Clark reveals the engagement ring in the episode "Abandoned" and proposed to Lois in the episode "Icarus", which Lois happily accepts. Over the course of the season, the two grow closer than ever, learning to rely on each other and help each other through challenges both normal and super. Their wedding ceremony occurred in the series finale, only to be interrupted by the coming of Darkseid. Clark defeated the evil entity and saved the world, and finally becomes Superman. A flash forward to the future depicts Clark and Lois working as reporters seven years later at the Daily Planet and still trying to find the right time to get married.

In 2019, Durance and Welling reprised their roles as Lois and Clark in the Arrowverse crossover event "Crisis on Infinite Earths". Set ten years after the Smallville series, Lois and Clark are now married with young daughters, and Clark gave up his superpowers to be with his family.

=== Arrowverse and Superman & Lois ===
Tyler Hoechlin portrayed Superman/Clark Kent with Elizabeth Tulloch as Lois Lane in the television series that make up the Arrowverse. Superman was introduced in the second season of Supergirl, while Lois first appeared in the 2018 crossover event "Elseworlds".

The executive producers stated that Clark and Lois have a strong partnership. Hoechlin says Clark and Lois "obviously have a very strong relationship that's been going like that for a while. It's deeper into the relationship, so there's that comfortability factor and they know each other so well. They really kind of have a life together."

When Superman arrives in National City in the episode "The Adventures of Supergirl", Clark and Lois were first mentioned as being a couple. In the episode "Nevertheless, She Persisted", Clark reveals to Kara that his love for Lois motivates him in every fight. Whenever he fights, no matter who it's against or where it is, his always fighting for Lois.

In the Supergirl episode "Elseworlds" part 3, Clark and Lois reveal to Kara that Lois is pregnant, and that they will be returning to Argo City for an extended period, leaving Kara to defend the Earth. Later, at the Fortress of Solitude, Clark proposes to Lois with a diamond ring made from coal. She happily accepts and kisses him.

In the 2019 crossover "Crisis on Infinite Earths", Lois and Clark are married and live on Argo City with their infant son Jonathan. The couple and their son evacuated to Earth and helped the earth's heroes defeat the Anti-Monitor. Following the crisis, the multiverse is restored, but changed, with Lois and Clark now have two sons.

In 2021, Hoechlin and Tulloch reprised their roles as Superman/Clark Kent and Lois Lane in the television series Superman & Lois. The show portrays a different version of Clark and Lois that appeared in the Arrowverse, with the series set on an alternate Earth and history and characters.

== Merchandising ==
- In 2006, DC Direct released a Superman Returns: The Daily Planet statue featuring Superman and Lois. It is one of four statues from Weta Collectibles inspired by the Superman Returns film.
- Lois and Superman are part of the Man of Steel (2013) Superman: Black Zero Escape Lego set.
- In 2015, Cryptozoic Entertainment released a Superman Lois Lane Rescue Fleischer statue, inspired by Fleischer Studio's 1940s Superman animated films.
- Superman: The Animated Series Superman and Lois action figures were released in 2016.
- Superman and Lois Lane by Gary Frank statue was released in 2016. It is part of the DC Designer series from DC Direct.
- Inspired by the 1940s Fleischer Superman animated short "The Mechanical Monsters", Mezco Toyz released a Superman - The Mechanical Monsters (1941) action figure set featuring Superman, Clark Kent, and Lois Lane.
- In 2021, Funko released a Pop figures set based on the flying scene with Superman and Lois in the 1978 film Superman.
- Iron Studios revealed a new Superman and Lois Lane statue in 2022.
- In 2023, Sideshow Collectibles debuted a Superman and Lois Lane diorama statue.
