= Origin of Superman =

Fiction depicting the early life of Superman

The abbreviated origin of Superman as featured in All-Star Superman #1 (January 2006) by Grant Morrison and Frank Quitely.

The origin of Superman and his superhuman powers have been a central narrative for Superman since his inception, with the story of the destruction of his home planet of Krypton, his arrival on Earth and emergence as a superhero evolving from Jerry Siegel's original story into a broad narrative archetype over the course of Superman's literary history and as the character's scope continues to expand across comics, radio, television and film.

The original story was written by Siegel and illustrated by Joe Shuster, and published as a part of the character's first appearance in Action Comics #1 (June 1938). As more stories were published, more details about the original story were established. These stories explored individual details, such as the planet Krypton, the source of Superman's powers and his relationships with supporting characters. Because continuity was looser during the Golden Age and the Silver Age, many of these stories contradicted each other.

As Superman was adapted into other media, his origin story has been frequently retold. These origin stories adhere to the basic framework created by Siegel and Shuster, with minor variations made to serve the plot or to appeal to contemporary audiences. Some of the details created for these adaptations influenced the origin story in the mainstream comic series.

In more recent years, the origin story has been revamped in the comic books several times. In 1985, DC Comics published Crisis on Infinite Earths, which created the opportunity to definitively revise the history of the DC Universe. Superman's origin was subsequently retold in the 1986 limited series The Man of Steel, written and drawn by John Byrne. The story was later removed from continuity ("retconned") and replaced with the Superman: Birthright limited series in 2003 and 2004, written by Mark Waid and drawn by Leinil Francis Yu, as Superman's official origin. After the Infinite Crisis limited series in 2005 and 2006, Superman's origin was revised yet again, unfolding throughout Superman's regular publications and the Superman: Secret Origin mini-series in 2009 and 2010.

== Basic story ==
While the individual details vary, certain key elements have remained consistent in almost all retellings.

Superman is born Kal-El on the planet Krypton. His parents, Jor-El and Lara become aware of Krypton's impending destruction and Jor-El begins constructing a spacecraft to carry Kal-El to Earth. During Krypton's last moments, Jor-El places young Kal-El in the spacecraft and launches it. Jor-El and Lara die as the spacecraft barely escapes Krypton's fate. The explosion transforms planetary debris into kryptonite, a radioactive substance that is lethal to superpowered (via Earth's yellow sun) Kryptonians.

The spacecraft lands in the rural United States, where it is found by a passing motorist. Jonathan and Martha Kent adopt Kal-El and name him Clark Kent. As Clark grows up on Earth, he and his adoptive parents discover that he has superhuman powers. The Kents teach Clark to use these powers responsibly to help others and fight crime.

Clark keeps his powers secret in order to protect his family and friends, who might be endangered by his criminal enemies. In order to use his powers to help humanity, Clark creates the alter ego of Superman. A number of elements are added to each identity to keep them distinct enough to prevent the casual observer from matching them. Superman wears a characteristic red and blue costume with a letter "S" emblem and a cape. Clark Kent takes to wearing glasses, styling his hair differently, changing his body language, significantly altering his voice, and wearing looser clothing and suits that hide his physique.

Clark Kent moves to Metropolis and takes a job as a reporter at the Daily Planet, where he meets his friends and co-workers, Lois Lane, Jimmy Olsen and editor Perry White. Superman becomes the subject of frequent headline stories written by Lois, and the two become romantically attracted to each other.

=== Common variations ===
Superman's public debut has differed throughout decades of publication. Originally, he first donned the costume and began fighting crime as an adult. Later, he was shown to have begun his heroic career as Superboy, changing his name to Superman after he grew up. The character's history as Superboy was retroactively erased from continuity in The Man of Steel retelling of the origin. The Superboy concept was later restored; in current continuity, Clark used his powers to aid others while still a youth, operating as "a rarely-glimpsed American myth – the mysterious 'Super-Boy'".

=== Influences ===
Superman's origin was influenced by the science fiction stories appearing in pulp magazines that Siegel and Shuster were fond of and by a variety of social and religious themes.

Siegel and Shuster created multiple characters named Superman. The first was a villain with telepathic powers, published in the short story "The Reign of the Superman". A later collaboration in 1934 with Russell Keaton has a Superman that is a meta-human sent back in time as an infant, where he is found and raised by Sam and Molly Kent. Another version, which was unpublished, was a crime fighter without any superhuman abilities, which Siegel and Shuster compare to another of their creations, Slam Bradley. They felt that a virtuous character originating from Earth to possess superhuman powers would make the character and stories seem less serious, inviting comparisons to humorous strongmen like Popeye. They decided to make the third version, as a visitor from another planet.

Siegel has cited the John Carter of Mars stories by Edgar Rice Burroughs as an influence on the source of Superman's strength and leaping ability being the lesser gravity of a smaller planet. Jack Williamson once remarked that Superman's origin had strong similarities to a story he had written and published early in his career, where a Martian scientist sent his infant daughter into space to save her from their planet's destruction.

Superman carries some similarities to Hugo Danner, the main character in the novel Gladiator by Philip Wylie. Danner's great strength comes from a serum injected into him by his father while still a fetus which gave him the proportional strength of an insect. The scientific explanation for the source of Superman's powers published in Action Comics #1 also compared Superman's great strength to an ant's ability to carry hundreds of times its own weight and a grasshopper's ability to leap great distances. Wylie later threatened to sue National Comics for plagiarism. Siegel signed an affidavit that claimed Superman was not influenced by Gladiator, though he had reviewed the novel for his fanzine Science Fiction in 1932.

Because Siegel and Shuster were both Jewish, some religious commentators and pop-culture scholars such as Rabbi Simcha Weinstein and British novelist Howard Jacobson suggest that Superman's creation was partly influenced by Moses and other Jewish elements. In contrast, Siegel and Shuster claimed that having Superman drop out of the sky seemed like a good idea.

== Publication history ==
=== Pre-Crisis ===
Superman's origin took more than twenty years to unfold into the narrative that is familiar today. During the Golden Age of Comics (1935–1953), Krypton and the Kents were almost incidental, seldom being referred to in the comic book stories. The Superman mythology expanded during the Silver Age of Comics (1953–1970) and was refined during the Bronze Age (1970–1986).

==== Golden Age ====
Siegel created, and Shuster designed, the character Superman in 1934 and intended to sell the character as a daily newspaper comic strip. They told Superman's origin over the course of twelve strips, ten of which detailed the planet Krypton.

In 1938, DC Comics published Superman's debut in Action Comics #1, Siegel and Shuster were required to cut the story down to thirteen pages, and so the origin story was reduced to a single page. The story described a scientist on an unnamed doomed planet placing his infant son into a hastily designed spaceship and launching it toward Earth. When the spaceship lands, a passing motorist finds it and turns the child over to a local orphanage, where the staff is astounded by the child's feats of strength. As the child matures, he discovers more of his abilities and decides to use them for the benefit of mankind as Superman. The last panel of this origin is captioned "A Scientific Explanation of Clark Kent's Amazing Strength", explaining he "had come from a planet whose inhabitants' physical structure was millions of years advanced of our own". Kent's strength is then compared with ants' and grasshoppers' abilities to lift many times their body weight and leap great distances.

Starting on January 16, 1939, Siegel's original stories and Shuster's original art work appeared in a daily newspaper comic strip through the McClure Newspaper Syndicate. The first days of the Superman daily newspaper strip retold the origin in greater detail, focusing on his departure from Krypton. In this retelling, the planet Krypton and Superman's biological parents, Jor-l and Lara, are called by name for the first time.

The first issue of Superman, published in 1939, also featured the origin story. Max Gaines had written to Siegel and Shuster and asked them to expand the origin sequence to two pages, and to include four pages that detailed how Clark Kent became a journalist as well as a full-page feature that expanded on the scientific explanation for Superman's powers. In this issue, the passing motorists are revealed to be the Kents, who leave him at the local orphan asylum but later return to adopt him. The Kents teach Clark that he must keep his powers a secret but that he will someday use them to assist humanity. Clark becomes Superman after the Kents pass away and wins his job as a reporter for the Daily Star by delivering information he had gathered as Superman about a lynch mob at the county jail. The feature on Superman's powers asserts again that Kryptonians had evolved to physical perfection, but also reveals that because Earth is smaller than Krypton, the lighter gravitational pull further enhanced Superman's strength.

In 1945, More Fun Comics #101 introduced the concept of Superboy, establishing that Superman began his superhero career as a child. This issue showed Krypton in much greater detail than before, as a scientifically advanced world. Kryptonians did not appear to possess superhuman powers on Krypton but were aware that a Kryptonian on Earth would have them. In this story, Superman's biological parents were named Jor-El and Lara. Jor-El attempted to convince the Supreme Council that their world was doomed and that they must take action. The Council scoffed at Jor-El's warnings, so he returned home to save his family, but was only able to save his son.

For the tenth anniversary in 1948 of Superman's debut, Superman #53 retold the origin story, compiling and expanding upon previous versions, though the story does not acknowledge the adventures of Superboy. This story establishes the Kents as farmers and that "Clark" is a family name. Before Clark's adopted father dies, he tells Clark that he must use his powers to become a force for good. Clark's father calls Clark a "Super-Man", inspiring Clark to use the name. Superman discovered his alien origins for the first time in Superman #61. Action Comics #158 retold the origin again, this time acknowledging the adventures of Superboy.

==== Silver Age ====
After Mort Weisinger took over as editor of the Superboy comics in 1953, the mythology of Superman began growing, starting with the introduction of Superboy's pet Krypto the Superdog, the first survivor of Krypton in comics other than Kal-El himself. When Weisinger became editor of the entire Superman line in 1958, the Superman mythology began expanding even more rapidly. Producing over a hundred Superman stories a year, Weisinger aimed to introduce a new element to the character's mythology every six months. By this time, the basic elements of Superman's origin were in place, and Weisinger capitalized on it. Weisinger and his writers gave Superman history and family and constructed a world for readers to explore.

Through flashbacks, imaginary stories and time travel, Superman comics in the Silver Age examined the implicit themes of Superman's origin as an orphan from another planet, while also providing explanations for many key story elements. In 1961, Superman #146 told the most complete version of the origin story to date, this time inserting references to other elements of the expanding Superman mythos, including Jor-El's warning to his brother Zor-El, father of Supergirl, about Krypton's fate and Krypto's launch into space.

==== Bronze Age ====
The stories published under Weisinger remained the basis for Superman's origin throughout the Bronze Age, but by the time Julius Schwartz took over as the editor of the Superman in 1970, continuity had strayed from the broader outline established in the 1960s. Schwartz relied on writer E. Nelson Bridwell, an expert in the fine details of the Superman mythology, to help refine the character's history. Bridwell explained to readers that many stories were no longer in continuity because they contradicted others, stating that "it was decided that the only thing to do was to throw out part of the tales and work the rest into a consistent whole". Superman's origin was retold during this time in The Amazing World of Superman (Metropolis Edition), which adhered to the origin previously established in the Silver Age. Martin Pasko wrote Action Comics #500 (October 1979), which featured a history of the Superman canon as it existed at the time and was published in the Dollar Comics format.

Jor-El's life, the destruction of Krypton, and the launch of the rocket that carried Kal-El to Earth, are documented in The World of Krypton (vol. 1) limited series. Superman: The Secret Years tells the story of Clark Kent's college career in which Superboy leaves Smallville to attend college, and copes with problems that force his outlook to mature, ending with Superboy changing his heroic identity to Superman after defeating Lex Luthor's plot to destroy the world.

=== Post-Crisis ===
In the 1980s, editors at DC Comics felt that its characters and their history had become convoluted and confusing to casual readers. In 1985, DC published Crisis on Infinite Earths, which rewrote the history of the DC Universe. DC had been planning to revamp Superman for some time, and Crisis gave the company freedom to reset the character from the very beginning.

==== The Man of Steel ====
In 1986, DC Comics hired writer and artist John Byrne, who had gained a reputation for re-energizing several Marvel Comics series, to write the relaunched Superman series and Action Comics. In addition to Byrne, managing editor and inker Dick Giordano, writer Marv Wolfman, artist Jerry Ordway and editor Andy Helfer recreated the Superman mythology from the ground up to appeal to modern audiences. This revamped origin was published in the six issue The Man of Steel limited series, written and pencilled by Byrne and inked by Giordano.

The Man of Steel opened on Krypton, vastly different from the planet developed in the Weisinger era, just before its destruction. Byrne felt that Krypton had been "'stuck' in a 1930s Buck Rogers-like art style for decades" and Giordano and publisher Jenette Kahn agreed that he should redesign it. The people of Krypton were portrayed as living in a cold and heartless society. Though they were masters of science, they had repressed their emotions and passion for life. Superman learned of his alien heritage several years into his heroic career, but marginalized it in favor of his upbringing on Earth.

Byrne's goal was to "pare away some of the barnacles that have attached themselves to the company's flagship title", and take Superman back to the basics. In this new continuity, the character was re-established as the last survivor of Krypton's destruction.

Man of Steel also illustrated significant events in Superman's relationships, such as his first interview with Lois Lane and his first encounter with Gotham City's Batman. Lex Luthor was reinvented by Wolfman and portrayed as a corrupt business tycoon who hated Superman for exposing his unethical business practices. Superman's adoptive parents lived into his adulthood, providing hooks that Byrne felt made the character more human.

==== Superman: Birthright ====
In 2002, DC Comics executive editor Dan DiDio asked writer Mark Waid to reimagine Superman's origin, making the character relevant for the 21st century. After taking the assignment, Waid's goal was to present a definitive volume on Superman's origin that was familiar to longtime fans as well as casual readers who were more familiar with Superman through television and film adaptations than through comics. Starting in 2003, the new origin story was published in the twelve issue Superman: Birthright limited series, written by Waid and drawn by Leinil Francis Yu.

During the early issues of the series, it was unclear if the story was intended to be the new origin of the mainstream Superman or the beginnings of a new universe, similar to Marvel's Ultimate line. DC later confirmed that Birthright was the new official origin of Superman, and it was embedded into the Superman fiction in Superman (vol. 2) #200.

Krypton was redesigned again in Birthright, portrayed as a society that used its advanced science and technology to make its planet into a paradise. Clark Kent respected his alien heritage and designed his Superman costume based on images of Kryptonian culture that were sent along with him in his spacecraft to Earth.

Birthright establishes that Lex Luthor grew up in Smallville and was good friends with Clark Kent. Inspired by the television series Smallville, Clark Kent's parents were portrayed as being similar to their television counterparts played by John Schneider and Annette O'Toole.

==== Superman: Secret Origin ====
Following the events of the Infinite Crisis limited series, DC Universe continuity was revamped in a way that both kept and altered previous elements in canon, and Superman's origin was no exception. The first revelations of this revised origin came only in bits and pieces. In Action Comics Annual #10 (2007), Krypton is shown to have characteristics that resemble the version that appears in the Richard Donner Superman films. In Action Comics #850, a more complete recap was presented: Krypto appears on Krypton, Jor-El's frustrations with the council, Clark's awareness about being adopted during grade school, a friendship with Lex Luthor when they are both teenagers, Clark wearing glasses in his teens, using his powers to help people while not in costume, and showing Lois Lane trying to secure interviews with Superman and being friends with Clark. Finally, the Geoff Johns/Gary Frank Superman and the Legion of Super-Heroes arc revealed that Clark's membership in the Legion of Super-Heroes when he is a teenager is now back in canon.

A complete tale of Superman's new origin was told in the Superman: Secret Origin limited series written by Geoff Johns and drawn by Gary Frank. Described as the "definitive" telling of the origin story of Superman, it features his life in Smallville, his first adventures with the Legion of Super-Heroes as Superboy, and his arrival in Metropolis all told from Clark Kent's point of view.

=== The New 52 ===
In August 2011, DC Comics rebooted its continuity and launched a new line of comics after that year's Flashpoint event. While the new Superman series portrays Superman's current adventures, Action Comics began its run telling the story of Superman's early days in Metropolis. The story reintroduced many Golden Age concepts (Superman fighting political and social corruption, starting out with reduced powers, working at the Daily Star rather than the Daily Planet) and removed several aspects reintroduced in Secret Origin (Clark Kent and Lex Luthor as childhood friends and his career as Superboy, though the Legion of Superheroes still played a part in Clark Kent's childhood). The story focuses on a young, social crusading Superman in a makeshift costume (shortly before acquiring the redesigned costume by Jim Lee), fending off the attacks of the Army and their consultant Dr. Lex Luthor, as well as contending with public fear resulting from his sudden appearance and defiance of the authorities.

Kal-El's escape from Krypton was depicted in Action Comics, vol. 2 #5. Krypton had built its society into a paradise. As Krypton begins to explode, Jor-El and Lara first consider escaping into the Phantom Zone with their son, but the portal to the zone is shattered by the convicts already there. Their last hope is to send Kal-El away in a prototype rocket, guided by Brainiac artificial intelligence to find planets with younger suns and weaker gravity.

As the ship lands on Earth, the Kents are stuck on the side of the road with a flat tire, lamenting Martha's miscarriage earlier that month. They rescue Kal-El from the ship before the government arrives. The Kents slip past them by presenting the baby as their own and offering instead the body of a deformed calf as the alien occupant. His adoptive parents die in a car accident when he is young. Ultimately, Superman meets and battles the Collector of Worlds, saving the Earth and receiving the public's trust as the world's first Super-Hero.

=== DC Universe: Rebirth ===
Following the comic book crossover event Convergence, it was revealed in the mini-series Superman: Lois and Clark that the pre-Flashpoint version of the character had survived the universal transition into the New 52 and was living on the new DC Universe's Earth with his wife, the pre-Flashpoint Lois Lane and their young son. After the indigenous New 52 Superman was killed, the pre-Flashpoint Superman became the DC Universe's primary version of the character once again. This brought the events of 2009's Secret Origin series back as the primary Superman's origin story once more.

In 2017, the Superman and Action Comics titles crossed over for a story arc entitled Superman Reborn, which re-characterized what occurred in the New 52. After Flashpoint, the single consciousnesses of both Superman and Lois Lane were fractured in two by an unknown entity, explaining why the two incarnations were able to exist at the same time. Co-writer Dan Jurgens explained that "the events of Action #976 reset and reshape the entire Superman timeline. Where there had been two Superman, their realities have now been fused into one timeline with just one of them. And, yes, Clark and Lois are back at the Daily Planet. Not only does everyone know they had a child; they were there shortly after Jon was born. The Daily Planet crew has known Jon his entire life".

Flashbacks seen in that story indicate that the origin as depicted in the New 52 and in Superman: Secret Origin have been hybridized, with most of the characters' pre-Flashpoint histories overwriting early New 52 stories.

In 2019, the mini-series Doomsday Clock made further alterations to the origin of Superman in the modern DC Universe. While an early issue explained that the deaths of Jonathan and Martha Kent occurred in an automobile accident when Clark was an adolescent (explaining their absence from the New 52), the conclusion of the story saw that alterations to the timeline made by Doctor Manhattan led to Clark becoming Superboy at an early age, allowing him to save his parents from their fatal collision and remain alive well into Clark's adulthood.

== Other versions ==
In the DC Comics multiverse, there are several versions of Superman originating from different parallel Earths. Most of these counterparts have subtle differences in their origins. Alterations to Superman's origin are also frequently used as the premises for Elseworlds and imaginary stories published by DC Comics.

=== Parallel Earths ===
Kal-L is the Superman of the pre-Crisis Earth-Two. His origin adheres to the basic origin, but he arrives on Earth early in the twentieth century and becomes active as a superhero in 1938. On his version of Krypton, all Kryptonians had superhuman abilities on their home planet due to the planet's greater gravitational pull. Kal-L never had a career as Superboy. The origin stories that appeared in Action Comics #1 and Superman #1 are attributed to Kal-L.

Superboy-Prime comes from the pre-Crisis Earth-Prime. On this Earth, Kal-El is teleported to Earth moments before the planet Krypton is destroyed when its sun went supernova. Because Earth-Prime's Krypton was consumed by its sun, kryptonite does not exist on Earth-Prime.

Absolute Superman takes place in Alpha-World, where Darkseid has influenced the universe to be darker and heroes are underdogs. Superman's background and upbringing has been dramatically changed: Kal-El grows up on Krypton with his family, who are all a part of the Labor Guild. When Krypton is close to dying, his parents create sunstone nano-suits that can save them and a small group, but only Kal-El seems to survive the planet's destruction. He arrives on Earth as an adolescent and is brought in by the struggling Kents. He is only with them a few weeks before he is reported to the militaristic Lazarus Corp and forced to flee. His trauma of losing his home and family causes Kal to lose his sense of identity and become alienated from humanity.

=== Elseworlds ===
In Superman: Red Son Superman's ship was launched by descendants of Lex Luthor and Lois Luthor in Earth's far future. The ship, travelling backward through time, lands on a Ukrainian collective farm rather than in Kansas. Instead of fighting for "... truth, justice, and the American Way", Superman is described in Soviet propaganda broadcasts "... as the Champion of the common worker who fights a never-ending battle for Stalin, socialism, and the international expansion of the Warsaw Pact".

In Superman: Speeding Bullets, Kal-El is found by Thomas and Martha Wayne, who decide to adopt the baby and name him Bruce. After Thomas and Martha are gunned down by a mugger, Bruce reacts by burning the mugger with his heat vision and discovers his superpowers. Years later, he decides to create a secret identity for himself as the Batman and starts to brutally strike back at the criminals in Gotham City.

In JLA: The Nail, the Kents do not discover the spacecraft because their truck's tire was punctured by a nail. Kal-El is found and adopted by an Amish family and does not become Superman until much later.

In the Tangent Comics reality, Superman's origin is completely different as an ordinary man finds himself evolving into something millions of years beyond human.

Superman: True Brit is a humorous re-imagining of Superman in which the ship crashes in England.

In Superman: Secret Identity, a teenage boy named Clark Kent in the "real world", where Superman is nothing more than a comic book character, somehow develops super-human powers like those of his namesake. After a brief career as a mysterious, non-costumed "Superboy", Clark dons the fictional character's colors and continues to work in secret as "Superman".

== In other media ==
Given Superman's cultural status as one of the most recognizable fictional characters ever created, he has been adapted into other forms numerous times. On first time outings, such as the premiere episode of a television series or a first feature film, the origin story is generally depicted.

=== Radio ===
His origin's first depiction outside of the source material was in the 1940 radio serial The Adventures of Superman. In this version, after being sent off in the rocket ship from Krypton, a kind of Counter-Earth on the other side of the Sun, by his father while still an infant, Superman matures during the flight and emerges full-grown as an adult when he lands on Earth. He is greeted by a man and a boy who give him the idea of disguising himself as Clark Kent, after which he looks for a job at the Daily Planet.

Among other concepts and characters, the radio program introduced kryptonite into the Superman mythology. These fragments of radioactive debris from Superman's home planet were created to allow actor Bud Collyer the occasional time off from recording, as Superman periodically succumbed to the baleful rays and be absent for some episodes. Kryptonite was incorporated into Superman's origin in the comics in Superman #61, published in 1949.

=== Superman 1940s cartoons ===
Fleischer Studios presented the origin in the first of the Superman animated cartoons. Titled simply "Superman" (also referred to as "The Mad Scientist"), the animated short begins with a brief prologue that introduces Krypton as an advanced civilization that had brought forth a race of supermen, whose mental and physical powers were developed to the absolute peak of human perfection. When giant quakes threaten to destroy Krypton forever, one of the planet's leading scientists places his infant son in a rocket bound for Earth. A passing motorist finds the uninjured child and takes it to the local orphanage. As the child grows to maturity, he discovers his powers and eventually takes the identity of Clark Kent. Jor-El is not mentioned by name in this first cartoon and Clark's adoptive parents are not mentioned at all.

The Fleischer cartoons were responsible for Superman being able to fly. When they started work on the series, Superman could only leap from place to place, but they deemed it as "silly looking" after seeing it animated and decided to have him fly instead.

=== Superman film serial ===
The first chapter of the 1948 Superman film serial, titled "Superman Comes to Earth", depicts Superman's origin in detail. In this version, Krypton is a rugged planet that begins undergoing a series of natural disasters, such as volcanic eruptions and tidal waves. Jor-El calls an emergency session of the governing council to warn them of the planet's impending fate. Jor-El explains that Krypton is being pulled into the sun, which will lead to the planet's destruction, and urges the council to sponsor the construction of a fleet of spacecraft to carry the population of Krypton to Earth. The council votes against Jor-El's proposal, even as the tremors shake their session and grow in frequency. Jor-El returns home, where he and his wife Lara send their infant son Kal-El to Earth in a model spacecraft that was intended to test the proposed larger spacecraft.

On Earth, Eben and Martha Kent find Kal-El in the spacecraft and pull him from it before it explodes. The Kents decide to raise him as their own and name him Clark. Clark is shown learning about his abilities as he grows up, displaying great strength and speed, X-ray vision, super hearing and super durability. Once Clark is an adult, Eben explains how he and Martha found him and that Clark has a responsibility to use his powers wisely and justly in the interest of truth, tolerance and justice. They agree that the world needs him and that he must leave their farm and go where he is needed. Clark states that he will pursue a job that will keep him close to world events, so he can be aware of emergencies immediately. Martha gives Clark a uniform made from the blankets they found him in and he decides to take on the secret identity Superman. The Kents die shortly after this conversation and Clark moves to Metropolis.

In later chapters, Clark applies for a job at the Daily Planet, and is hired after delivering a story on a mining accident from which Superman rescues Lois Lane.

=== Adventures of Superman ===
Jor-El and Lara send baby Kal-El to Earth in the first episode of Adventures of Superman.

The 1950s TV series Adventures of Superman explored Superman's origin in the first episode, titled "Superman on Earth". The destruction of Krypton and Clark's upbringing by the Kents are largely identical to the version presented in the 1948 film serial. In this version, Clark decides to move to Metropolis after Eben dies. He is hired by the Daily Planet after getting an exclusive interview with a man rescued by Superman in his first public appearance.

=== Superman: The Movie ===
The origin presented in Richard Donner's 1978 Superman film is considered to be the definitive origin story not only for Superman, but a template for origin stories in the super hero film genre. The film keeps the classic components intact, but explores more of Clark's boyhood in Smallville. Much of the film's groundwork is laid during the film's first sequences on the planet Krypton, with actor Marlon Brando portraying Superman's Kryptonian father, Jor-El. In this film, Jonathan Kent dies when Clark is still in high school, but Martha survives to see her adopted son become Superman.

Superman is divided into three basic sections, each with three distinct themes and visual styles. The first segment, set on Krypton, is meant to be typical of science fiction films, but also lays the groundwork for the Jesus Christ analogy that emerges in the relationship between Jor-El and Kal-El. The second segment, set in Smallville, is reminiscent of 1950s films, and its small-town atmosphere is meant to evoke a Norman Rockwell painting. The third (and largest) segment was an attempt to present the superhero story with as much realism as possible (what Donner called "verisimilitude"), relying on traditional cinematic drama and using only subtle humor instead of a campy approach.

=== Lois & Clark ===
In the 1990s television series Lois & Clark: The New Adventures of Superman, more inspiration was taken from Byrne's work on Man of Steel. Feeling it was a more relatable version of the story, the show's producers and main developer also kept around Superman's adoptive parents as regular cast members, giving the main protagonist people to confide in. The series pilot begins with Clark's arrival in Metropolis. Clark and his mother develop his uniform in a musical montage set against Bonnie Tyler's single "Holding Out for a Hero". Superman makes his public debut saving a space station mission from sabotage by Lex Luthor, who is initially portrayed in his corporate tycoon incarnation.

Clark's adoptive parents explain how they found him in a spacecraft in the second episode "Strange Visitor (From Another Planet)" and how they initially believed that he was part of an experiment when investigators ask them about debris from a Russian space station. Clark later learns that he is from Krypton after finding the spacecraft in the custody of the secret government agency Bureau 39. Clark questions why he was abandoned, but later learns of Krypton's destruction through a series of messages left for him by Jor-El in the episode "Foundling". The series explored more of the history and culture of Krypton in a story arc that spanned the final episodes of the third season and the first episodes of the fourth.

=== Superman: The Animated Series ===
Superman: The Animated Series premiered with a three-part episode titled "The Last Son of Krypton". The series creators felt that focusing on the alien civilization of Krypton in the premiere episode would help differentiate the series from their earlier work Batman: The Animated Series. They intended to mirror the structure of the origin presented in the 1978 film, but they felt that it would seem stale unless they added some new dimension to it.

This version's major difference is Brainiac's role in Krypton's destruction. Brainiac is portrayed as a supercomputer that monitors Krypton and advises the planetary council on scientific matters. He senses the imminent destruction of the planet, but denies it so he can avoid the council's order to organize the planet's evacuation and instead focus on saving himself. Brainiac reasons that the loss of the planet itself and all its living inhabitants is part of the natural order, but his own survival would ensure the preservation of Krypton's history and achievements. Because he goes against Brainiac and the Kryptonian Council, Jor-El becomes an outlaw in their eyes as he works to save his son. After the destruction of Krypton and Kal-El's arrival on Earth, Brainiac eventually becomes an enemy of Superman.

=== Smallville ===
A slightly older Kal-El just out of his Kryptonian ship in the pilot episode of Smallville.

The television series Smallville is a reimagining of the Superman mythology, starting from Clark Kent's teenage years. The series is named after Clark Kent's home town and focuses on the challenges he faces growing up in the rural midwest, while also discovering his super powers and the details of his alien origins. The series creators and cast specified that the series is about Clark Kent and not Superman, and that the character would not appear in costume or fly in the series. By series end, however, at least one of these rules was broken.

The series begins with the arrival of Kal-El's spacecraft in Smallville during a massive meteor shower that affects the rural town for years to come. Jonathan and Martha Kent find the child and adopt him with the help of Lionel Luthor. The Kents raise Clark and instruct him that he must not reveal his powers to anyone. Clark initially becomes friends with Lex Luthor, but Lex's obsession with learning Clark's secret drives them to become enemies.

Clark is aware of his super-speed, super-strength and invulnerability in the series pilot. In subsequent episodes and seasons, he discovers other abilities, including X-ray vision, heat vision, super hearing and super breath. Clark has demonstrated his ability to fly while under Jor-El's control, but does not know how to use this ability at will.

Details about the planet Krypton are revealed slowly over the course of the series. Clark learns of the planet and his alien origins from Dr. Virgil Swann. He later discovers that Jor-El had programmed his memory and will into the spacecraft that carried Clark to Earth. Through Jor-El, Clark learns that Zod's ambition to conquer Krypton led to the planet's destruction. Clark's journey is completed in the last episode of the series, when he dons the costume and becomes Superman to stop Apokolips from colliding with Earth.

=== Superman Returns ===
Director Bryan Singer felt that most people were familiar with Superman's origin and wanted to make Superman Returns as a semi-sequel to Richard Donner's Superman, with the two films sharing the same origin story. The film opens with a brief summary of the origin story that reads: "On the doomed planet Krypton, a wise scientist placed his infant son into a spacecraft and launched him to Earth. Raised by a kind farmer and his wife, the boy grew up to become our greatest protector...Superman". Otherwise, the film portrays only a few scenes related to Superman's origin. The destruction of Krypton is seen before the opening credits, Lex Luthor invades the Fortress of Solitude and views the recordings that Jor-El had sent to Earth with Kal-El, and Clark Kent discovers his ability to fly in a flashback.

Superman Returns utilized footage of Marlon Brando as Jor-El, and nearly identical set design for Kryptonian structures as the 1978 film. Subtle similarities were also purposefully created, such as modeling the "new" Kent farmhouse after the "old" one, and having Eva Marie Saint's Martha Kent drive the same make and color of pickup truck as driven by the Kents in the original film. Certain scenes in the Kent farm also showed pictures of Brandon Routh's Clark Kent inserted into photos with Glenn Ford's Jonathan Kent.

=== Man of Steel / DC Extended Universe ===
In 2013, Warner Bros. released Man of Steel, a reboot of the Superman film franchise that went on to be the first entry in the DC Extended Universe series of interconnected films. Director Zack Snyder said that the film has a focus on Superman's early days and is not based on any particular comic book. For the most part, the film keeps classic elements intact but explores Clark's life before becoming Superman. Much like previous versions, Jonathan dies but Martha survives to see her son become Superman. Jor-El also appears as a Kryptonian hologram, having secreted an artificial intelligence based on his personality and appearance aboard Kal-El's ship in order to guide him into adulthood.

Man of Steel reimagines Krypton as a technologically advanced but culturally stagnant society where natural conception is considered heretical and the citizenry are instead cloned and genetically engineered to fulfill predetermined roles in Kryptonian society based on material taken from an ancient genetic codex. Jor-El is the foremost member of the scientific caste who becomes disillusioned with Kryptonian dogma after he discovers the planet's core has been irreparably destabilized and conceives Kal-El with his wife Lara as Krypton's first natural birth in centuries before stealing the codex to infuse in Kal-El's genes and send him to Earth in the hope that a new Kryptonian civilization might one day be created to live in harmony with humanity. When Kal-El arrives at Earth, he is adopted by Jonathan and Martha Kent, who name him Clark. When he reaches adulthood, Clark develops his abilities and becomes a drifter, saving people in secret. Later, Clark joins an investigation led by Lois Lane of a Kryptonian spaceship, where learns about his alien heritage. Lois, who had followed Clark into the ship, investigates Clark's life and decides not to reveal his secret just as General Zod, an old friend of Jor-El and the former leader of Krypton's soldier caste, arrives at Earth having detected the reactivation of the ship. He is initially pleased at having found a fellow survivor but the two come to blows when Clark realizes Zod's genetic programming will drive him to create a new Krypton on Earth regardless of what will happen to humanity. During their final battle, Superman is forced to kill Zod to prevent him from killing civilians. Clark later decides to become a reporter alongside Lois at the Daily Planet in order to continue his superhero activities.

=== DC Universe ===
While the destruction of Krypton is not shown, the 2025 DC Universe (DCU) film Superman does feature it as a major plot point, and it is directly shown in the 2026 DCU film Supergirl. Thirty years before the events of Superman, Jor-El and Lara send their infant son, Kal-El, to Earth to save him from their planet's imminent destruction. They leave behind a recorded message expressing their love for him, but due to damage sustained by the ship during transit, the second half of the message becomes corrupted and inaccessible. Upon his arrival on Earth, Kal-El is adopted by the Kents. Later, after taking on the identity of Superman, Clark Kent occasionally revisits the message from his biological parents in the Fortress of Solitude.

Shortly after Kal-El's ship is launched, Jor-El's brother Zor-El and his wife Alura evacuate along with many other Kryptonians to Argo City, where Zor-El activates a force field system that separates the city from the rest of the planet, preventing it from being destroyed when its core explodes. The city continues to exist in isolation with no issues for at least eight years, when Alura gives birth to her and Zor-El's daughter, Kara. Eventually, it is discovered that the separation of Argo City exposed a mineral known as "Kryptonite", which is slowly killing the citizens via radiation with no possibility of developing a cure in time to save them. After Alura succumbs to Kryptonite poisoning, Zor-El decides to send Kara and her dog Krypto on a ship headed to Earth, where they are found by Superman. Zor-El and rest of the citizens die of Kryptonite poisoning off-screen, leaving Kara, Krypto, and Superman as the sole survivors of Krypton.

In 2025, Lex Luthor, alongside his allies Ultraman and the Engineer, infiltrates the Fortress of Solitude in search of secrets about Superman. Using her nanotech-enhanced body, the Engineer successfully restores the corrupted Kryptonian message, which Luthor then broadcasts to the world. Superman is devastated to discover that his biological parents intended for him to conquer Earth and take multiple wives to rebuild the Kryptonian race, a stark contrast to his long-held belief that they sent him to protect humanity.

This revelation is part of a broader scheme orchestrated by Luthor, who is secretly collaborating with the nation of Boravia to justify an invasion of its neighbor, Jarhanpur, a conflict in which Superman had previously intervened. Luthor hopes that by discrediting Superman, public opinion will shift in favor of Boravia's aggression, and he will have an excuse to kill him.

Luthor's plan unravels when his girlfriend, Eve Teschmacher, covertly sends Jimmy Olsen a series of selfies that reveal key details of the scheme in the background. These images are later published in the Daily Planet by Lois Lane, exposing the truth. With his name cleared and Luthor arrested, Superman reaffirms his commitment to humanity, choosing to live by the values he was raised with, despite the knowledge of his parents' original intentions.

== See also ==
- Kryptonian
- Origin of Batman
