= Kin (comics) =

Comic book series by Gary Frank

- Cover of the first issue
- Author: Gary Frank
- Genre: comics
- Publisher: Top Cow

Kin is a 6 issues comic-book limited series created in 2000 by Gary Frank and published by Top Cow, an imprint of American company Image Comics.

== Plot ==
A secret government agency S.I.A. finds out that the neanderthals still exist hidden in Alaskan mountains and proceed to eliminate them in order to obtain their technology that developed differently from the rest of the world. A S.I.A. agent Trey McAloon confronts the organization about the issue while Alaskan Park Ranger Elizabeth Leaky establishes contact with one member of the neanderthals.

The mini-series had an open-ended final, with questions of another S.I.A. boss whose orders formed the operation unanswered as well as the fate of a tribe of neanderthals that were shifted to another S.I.A. base.

The series was collected in a trade paperback collection form subtitled "Descent of Man" with 6 new pages of story and art. It was also translated and published in France, Mexico and Brazil.
