= Superman: Birthright =

American comic book series

- Cover from Superman: Birthright #1, art by Leinil Francis Yu.

Publication information
- Publisher: DC Comics
- Schedule: Monthly
- Format: Limited series
- Genre: Superhero
- Publication date: September 2003 – September 2004
- No. of issues: 12
- Main character(s): Superman; Lex Luthor

Creative team
- Written by: Mark Waid
- Penciller: Leinil Francis Yu
- Inker: Gerry Alanguilan

Collected editions
- (hardcover): ISBN 1-4012-0251-9

Superman: Birthright is a twelve-issue comic book limited series published by DC Comics in 2003 and 2004, written by Mark Waid and drawn by Leinil Francis Yu and Gerry Alanguilan.

== Creation ==
The series was originally intended to be a non-canon version of Superman, showcasing his origin and updating it for the 21st century. Soon after, it was decided to adopt the series as canon, and thus it replaced John Byrne's The Man of Steel series as Superman's canonical origin story. The project was given to Mark Waid with the request to make an origin story for Superman set in the 21st century, a series that new readers can understand without any previous knowledge of the character's mythos. This was something Waid had wanted to do since seeing Superman: The Movie for the first time.

By comparison to other origin retellings, Waid wanted some differences. In an attempt to make his character more relatable, his Superman is not infallible, he has problems with his boss, his dry cleaning gets lost and he longs to connect and be accepted. Another difference was having Africa in the origin that, as Waid has it, helps establish Kal-El/Clark as a citizen of the world and demonstrates what kind of journalist he is. The Infinite Crisis storyline altered Superman's history so that Birthright and John Byrne's The Man of Steel mini-series were removed as his canonical origin. This was reinforced by then-monthly Superman writer Kurt Busiek's statement that the post-Infinite Crisis Superman's origin had yet to be established. The new origin was later revealed in the Superman: Secret Origin mini-series.

== Plot ==
The story begins with a retelling of Superman's origin, where his parents Jor-El and Lara send baby Kal-El away from the planet Krypton before its destruction. The planet's explosion is already under way when they send off the craft into the sky. On a nearby monitor programmed by Jor-El, the screen shows flickering and broken images from the habitable planet for which he has targeted the craft through a time disrupting wormhole. The images break up as they wonder if their son will survive or if anybody anywhere will ever know anything about the heritage of Krypton.

The scene hard cuts to the present day, where mid-20s freelance journalist Clark Kent visits Africa to interview political leader and activist Kobe Asuru, and forms a friendship. Kent is particularly impressed with Asuru's emphasis on family and cultural traditions. During a political rally, Asuru is killed by an unidentified assassin. During the attack, Kent saves scores of potential victims. He also avoids being detected by everyone present as a superpowered being, with the exception of Asuru's younger sister Abena, who survives the incident and becomes a key figure in the political revolution started by her brother.

Afterwards, Clark returns to Smallville, finds the ship that brought him to Earth, and uses it to learn Krypton's history and his own cultural heritage. His mother Martha Kent helps to adapt the Kryptonian clothing and a dramatic flag banner contained in the ship into an indestructible costume for Clark.

Jonathan and Martha both agree that if Clark is going to begin performing super powered rescues, he should develop a separate "human identity" to avoid public harassment and possible attempts at criminal retaliation. They suggest Clark develops an undistinguished everyday persona, wearing unremarkable clothes and assuming informal posture, that in itself would be a dramatic contrast to his essentially unavoidable appearance as a powerful and physically imposing figure during his superpowered rescues. Thus Clark leaves Smallville ready to embark on a public career.

Clark, wearing informal clothes, travels to Metropolis and joins the Daily Planet newspaper, impressing resident star journalist Lois Lane with his reputation and reports from the African battle zones. She is conversely surprised by Kent's midwestern shyness and general social awkwardness.

Shortly after Kent's arrival at the Planet, operating openly as Superman, he battles apparent terrorist helicopters, which cause considerable damage in the city. After discovering that the helicopters originate from LexCorp, Superman travels there and confronts Lex Luthor, who pretends to endorse Superman while attempting to destroy his reputation. Flashbacks reveal that Luthor is a former Smallville friend of Clark who lost his father Lionel and his hair after a wormhole he built malfunctioned and exploded. After leaving Smallville, Luthor has become a billionaire businessman and technological genius, with a high emphasis on extraterrestrial life. Arrogantly wishing to erase his farmland origins, Luthor denies ever having been in Smallville.

Planning to panic the citizenry, Luthor engineers a fake Kryptonian invasion, but Superman stops him and Luthor's schemes are revealed to the world after much of his LexCorp headquarters are destroyed. In the final seconds of the battle, Superman discovers the video monitor invented by Luthor which had managed to make contact with pre-destruction Krypton. He stands before the screen, silhouetted against smoke and flashing lights in the background, and sees the shadowy figures of his parents. They are also obscured with smoke as the planet goes through its final destruction. Jor-El and Lara see the imposing figure of Superman on their monitor, looking at them while clothed in the El Family "S-symbol". Superman views the monitor and says: "Mother, Father, I made it". His parents realize Kal-El has survived as they hoped, so they smile and embrace as Krypton finally explodes.

== Collected editions ==
The series has been collected into the following formats:

=== English version by DC Comics ===
- Superman: Birthright (collects #1–12, 304 pages)

- hardcover edition (1401202519, 2005-09-28)
- softcover edition (1401202527, 2005-09-28)

- Superman: Birthright: The Deluxe Edition (collects #1–12, extras, 328 pages)

- hardcover edition (ISBN 1779517432, 2022-12-20)

- Superman: Birthright: DC Compact Comics Edition (collects #1-12, 296 pages)

- softcover edition (ISBN 1799501914, 2025-06-24)

== Reception ==
According to Comicbook Roundup, Superman: Birthright received positive reviews from critics. The series received an average rating of 7.6 out of 10 based on 5 reviews.

== In other media ==
- Elements of Superman: Birthright are incorporated into Man of Steel (2013) and Superman (2025).
- Superman: Birthright was one of the inspirations for the animated film Superman: Man of Tomorrow, among several others.
