= Gary Frank (artist) =

British comics artist

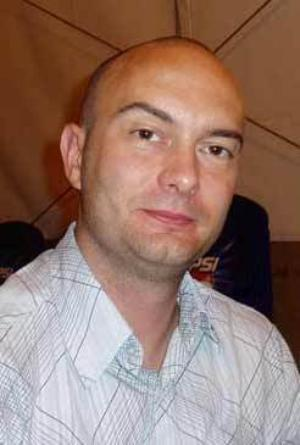
- Frank in 2008
- Born: 1969 (age 56–57) Bristol, England
- Area: Penciller
- Notable works: Action Comics; Doomsday Clock; Gen^{13} The Incredible Hulk; Supreme Power; Superman: Secret Origin
- Awards: Inkpot Award (2013)

Gary Frank (born 1969) is a British comics artist, notable for pencilling on Midnight Nation and Supreme Power, both written by J. Michael Straczynski. He has also worked with author Peter David on The Incredible Hulk and Supergirl. He had a creator-owned series, Kin, which he wrote himself, published by Top Cow Productions in 2000.

Writer Geoff Johns, who collaborated with Frank on Doomsday Clock, has opined that Frank's rendition of Superman is the best of his generation and that the only other artist in the same league with Frank in this regard is Curt Swan.

== Comics career ==
=== 1990s ===
Gary Frank began his professional career in 1991, illustrating covers and interior short stories for publications such as Doctor Who Magazine and Toxic!. After illustrating the comic elements of Marvel's HeroQuest tie-in HeroQuest: A Marvel Winter Special in 1991 he became a regular series artist in 1992 on Motormouth & Killpower. It was on that series that he began a long-running collaboration with inker Cam Smith, who would continue to ink Frank's work for many years. In 1992, Frank was recruited by Marvel Comics to illustrate covers for The Incredible Hulk, beginning with issue No. 400. Shortly thereafter, he was hired as the series' ongoing artist beginning with issue No. 403 (March 1993) and ending with No. 425 (Jan. 1995). Frank later said that the series "was a green beacon at the point when I was breaking into comics. It seemed to be the one book at Marvel without an 'X' on it that really got fans excited. When I came aboard, I couldn't believe how welcoming and generous [The Incredible Hulk writer] Peter [David] was to a young artist with no real track record ..." Issue No. 419 (July 1994) was drawn by a guest artist, and the splash page makes a joke about Frank's absence; in the aftermath of Rick Jones and Marlo Chandler's wedding, a waiter informs the Hulk that "that British artist friend of yours" was found passed out from too much alcohol, and the Hulk remarks, "Hope he didn't have any tight deadlines."

During his initial time at Marvel, Frank contributed covers, interiors and pin-up illustrations for various series, such as X-Men Unlimited, the Sabretooth Special, X-Men Classic, X-Men Prime, and Doctor Strange, Sorcerer Supreme, among others. He drew covers for Acclaim Comics' Ninjak and Harris Comics' Vampirella.

In 1996, Frank and Smith were hired as the art team on DC Comics' new Supergirl ongoing series, which re-teamed Frank with writer Peter David. Frank's run as penciller ended with issue No. 9 (May 1997), although he continued to provide covers for the series until issue No. 21. Other assignments for DC included a Birds of Prey one-shot and the DC/Marvel Amalgam Comics one-shot, Bullets and Bracelets.

In 1997, Frank and Smith moved to Image Comics, where they, along with writer John Arcudi, were hired as the new creative team on the Wildstorm title Gen^{13}, beginning with the epilogue story in issue No. 25. The Arcudi/Frank/Smith tenure on the series lasted two years, until issue No. 41 (July 1999). It was during this run, in 1998, that Wildstorm head Jim Lee moved his studio and all its properties to DC Comics. Therefore, issues No. 25–36 were published by Image and issues No. 37–41 were published by DC/Wildstorm.

=== 2000s ===
In 2000, Frank worked on various assignments for both DC and Marvel, including issue No. 7 of Tom Strong under DC's America's Best Comics imprint and writing and penciling a two-page X-Men story in X-Men: Millennial Visions, his final collaboration to date with inker Cam Smith. Kin, a six-issue miniseries created, written and penciled by Frank, was published under Image's Top Cow imprint. The story tells of a secret government agency named S.I.A. who discovers that a race of neanderthal men exists in the mountains of Alaska and proceed to eliminate them to obtain their technology, which developed differently from that of the rest of the world. The book's protagonist, S.I.A. agent Trey McAloon, is opposed to the agency's plans and confronts them about it, while the book's other main character, Alaskan Park Ranger Elizabeth Leaky, establishes contact with one of the neanderthals.

The miniseries' conclusion was open-ended, with questions left unanswered, but so far no sequel or continuation of the story has been announced. The trade paperback collection of Kin entitled Kin: Descent of Man includes six pages of additional story that were not featured in the original issues.

In 2000, Frank began his first collaboration with J. Michael Straczynski, the television writer and creator of Babylon 5. Frank served as penciller on Straczynski's Midnight Nation, a 12-issue limited series published by Top Cow from 2000 to 2002 under their now-defunct Joe's Comics imprint. The first issue of the series included a five-page interview with Frank and Straczynski. One of the inkers on the series was Jon Sibal, with whom Frank would begin a long-running artistic collaboration that continues to this day.

On 16 July 2002, it was announced that Frank had signed an exclusive contract with Marvel. His first work under this contract was a two-issue story arc on The Avengers issues No. 61–62, written by Geoff Johns and inked by Jon Sibal. In 2003, Frank re-teamed with Straczynski on Supreme Power, a revamp of Marvel's superhero team Squadron Supreme, published under their mature-audience Marvel MAX imprint. With its realism and mature storytelling, the series became Marvel's first MAX title to sell over 100,000 copies, making it their best-selling mature-readers series of all time. The series ran for 18 issues from October 2003 to October 2005.

During his run on Supreme Power, Frank provided covers for a diverse number of Marvel series such as Silver Surfer No. 7; Wolverine/Punisher No. 2; The Incredible Hulk No. 75; issues No. 4 and 6 of the Supreme Power spin-off miniseries, Doctor Spectrum; The Amazing Spider-Man No. 515 and 517; Black Panther No. 10; and numerous others, as well as two pages of interior art for the Avengers: Finale one-shot.

On 10 May 2007, having worked several years on a Marvel exclusive contract, Frank signed a new one with DC Comics. He served as the artist on Action Comics with writer Geoff Johns. The creative team produced the "Brainiac" storyline in which Superman's adopted father Jonathan Kent was killed. Frank and Johns continued to work on Superman in the Superman: Secret Origin six-issue mini-series. The story features what Johns and DC Executive Editor Dan DiDio called a "definitive" telling of the origin story of Superman, dealing with his life in Smallville, his first adventure with the Legion of Super-Heroes as Superboy, and his arrival in Metropolis and at the Daily Planet.

=== 2010s ===
In 2012, Frank and Johns collaborated on Batman: Earth One, an original graphic novel set on Earth-one of the DC Multiverse. The novel is the first in a series of graphic novels that redefines Batman. Since 2017, Johns and Frank have worked together on Doomsday Clock, a limited series featuring Superman and Doctor Manhattan.

=== 2020s ===
On 12 October 2023, Frank and a group of colleagues announced at the New York Comic Con that they were forming a cooperative media company called Ghost Machine, which would publish creator-owned comics, and allow the participating creators to benefit from the development of their intellectual properties. The company publishes its books through Image Comics, and its other founding creators include Geoff Johns, Brad Meltzer, Jason Fabok, Bryan Hitch, Francis Manapul, and Peter J. Tomasi, all of whom would produce comics work exclusively through that company. Frank's inaugural work for the company was drawing Geiger: Ground Zero, a two-issue series written by Johns that serves as a prequel to their 2021 miniseries of the same name. Set in a post-apocalyptic future, the book centers upon a man named Tariq Geiger who lost his family and his humanity in a nuclear war, when he was transformed into the Glowing Man, a being who can absorb radiation but struggles to contain it. Ground Zero would be followed by an ongoing Geiger series.

== Work in other media ==
In 1990, prior working in the comics industry, Gary Frank produced a book titled Rovers: Portrait of a Football Team, which featured caricatures of a number of Bristol Rovers F.C. players from the 1989–90 season. He wrote it in conjunction with then-Rovers player Geoff Twentyman.

Frank's artwork was featured during the finale of the TV series Smallville when the character Chloe Sullivan is shown reading a Superman comic book to her son.

== Awards ==
Frank received an Inkpot Award in 2013.

== Bibliography ==
Comics work (interior pencil art) includes:

=== DC Comics ===
- Action Comics #858–863, 866–870, 900, Annual #10 (2007–11)
- The Batman Chronicles #10 (1997)
- Batman: Dark Knight Dynasty (among other artists) (1998)
- Batman: Earth One (2012)
- Batman: Earth One – Volume Two (2015)
- Batman: Earth One – Volume Three (2021)
- Black Canary/Oracle: Birds of Prey, one-shot (1996)
- Bullets and Bracelets #1 (Amalgam Comics, 1996)
- Countdown #30 (General Zod) (2007)
- DC Universe: Legacies, limited series, (Blue Beetle) #10 (2011)
- DC Rebirth, one shot (among other artists) (2016)
- Doomsday Clock #1–12 (2017–2019)
- Gen^{13} vol. 2 #37–41 (Wildstorm (1999)
- JLA #15 (1998)
- Just Imagine Stan Lee With Gary Frank Creating Shazam (2002)
- Justice League, vol. 2, (Shazam!) #7–11, No. 0, #14–16, #18–21 (2012–13)
- Supergirl, vol. 4, #1–9 (1996–97)
- Superman: New Krypton Special, one-shot (among other artists) (2008)
- Superman: Secret Origin, miniseries, #1–6 (2009–10)
- Tangent Comics: The Flash #1 (1997)
- Tom Strong #7 (America's Best Comics, 2000)
- War of the Supermen #0 (among other artists) (2010)
- Wonder Woman Annual #1 (2007)

=== Image Comics ===
- Geiger #1–6 (2021)
- Geiger vol. 2 #1–6, 9–15 (2024–25)
- Geiger: Ground Zero #1–2 (2023)
- Gen^{13} vol. 2 #25–36 (1997–99)
- Ghost Machine #1 (2024)
- Junkyard Joe #1–6 (2022–23)
- Kin #1–6 (2000)
- Midnight Nation #1–12, 0.5 (Wizard Special Issue) (Image Comics, 2000–01)

=== Marvel Comics ===
- The Avengers vol. 3 #61–62 (2003)
- Avengers Finale (among other artists) (2005)
- Dark Angel #6 (1992)
- Doctor Strange Sorcerer Supreme #82–83 (1995)
- The Incredible Hulk, vol. 2, #403–411, 413–418, 420–423, 425 (1993–95)
- The Incredible Hulk, vol. 3, #100–101, 106–107 (2007)
- Motormouth #1-4 (1992)
- Motormouth & Killpower #6 (1992)
- Sabretooth Special # 1 (1995)
- Squadron Supreme vol. 2 #1–5, 7 (2006)
- Supreme Power #1–18 (2003–05)
- X-Men: Prime (among other artists) (1995)

=== Other publishers ===
- Godwheel #1 (Malibu Comics, 1995)
- Vampirella/Dracula: The Centennial (Harris Publications, 1997)

Preceded by Jan Duursema	The Incredible Hulk vol. 2 artist 1993–1995	Succeeded by Liam Sharp
Preceded by n/a	Supergirl vol. 4 artist 1996–1997	Succeeded by Leonard Kirk
Preceded by Al Rio	Gen^{13} vol. 2 artist 1998–1999	Succeeded by Kevin Maguire
Preceded by Eric Powell	Action Comics artist 2007–2008	Succeeded by Pete Woods
