= Superman Reborn (comics) =

2017 comics story

- Publisher: DC Comics
- Publication date: March 2017
- Genre: Superhero
Title(s)
Superman (vol. 4) #18–19
Action Comics (vol. 1) #975–976
Superwoman #8-9
Supergirl (vol. 5) #8
New Superman #10
Trinity (vol. 2) #8
- Main character(s): Superman; Jon Kent; Lois Lane; Mister Mxyzptlk

Creative team
- Writer(s): Dan Jurgens; Peter Tomasi; Patrick Gleason
- Artist(s): Patrick Gleason; Doug Mahnke
- Inker(s): Jaime Mendoza; Trevor Scott

Superman Reborn is a four-part crossover Superman storyline published by DC Comics in 2017, written by Dan Jurgens, Peter J. Tomasi and Patrick Gleason. The crossover appeared in Action Comics #975-976 and Superman #18-19. The event formally merges the New 52 Superman and the post-Crisis Superman to form a new singular continuity and history.

The storyline received generally critical acclaim with critics praising the pacing, story, art, and the ending.

== Synopsis ==
Mr. Oz observes a blue ray of energy streaking across the universe and realizes that Mister Mxyzptlk has gotten out. Mr. Oz goes to the cell where he sees drawings of Superman and words expressing hope about Superman coming to save the prisoner. Meanwhile Clark Kent, his wife Lois Lane and Jon Kent are having a party for their anniversary. The family hear ringing on their doorbell and Jon sees a human Clark walking off while leaving a blank book.

Krypto rushes toward the human Clark, and Superman suits up to confront his doppelgänger but finds no one there except Jon holding up the book. The family look into the book, and they see pictures of themselves from another time (before The New 52) with Jon asking why is not he in these pics. Superman realizes their house is engulfed with blue fire but the house is being erased by something magical. Jon is caught by the flames and his parents attempt to put the flames out, but Jon suddenly vanishes without a trace. A few moments later, he reappears in a different room within the house. Superman covers Jon with his cape and the family makes their way outside. The flames consume the entire neighborhood, leaving no trace. Superman and Lois realize that their son was taken by the doppelgänger and vow to get him back.

Superman flies Lois toward the apartment of the human doppelgänger. While looking around, they are confronted by the doppelgänger. The doppelgänger reveals himself as Mister Mxyzptlk and explains the reason why he took Jon away was because Superman never looked for him ever since he was captured and Superman cared more for Jon than him. Mxyzpltk also explained that he was the reason why the majority of the world forgot Superman's identity and has hidden Jon somewhere where Superman cant find him. Mxyzpltlk disappears leaving Superman and Lois alone in the apartment. To make matters worse, Mxyzptlk erases Lois' memory of Jon as another way to demoralize Superman.

Mxyzptlk goes to Jon and explains his history to him, and reveals that when he arrived in The New 52 universe he was suddenly taken away by a transdimensional booby trap by Mr. Oz. Mxyzptlk waited for Superman but after years had passed he realized Superman didn't care that he was gone and was angry and sad. Mxyzptlk says his name backwards multiple times until he was free, then disguised himself as Clark Kent to escape Mr. Oz, but in the process Mxyzptlk loses his memory. Jon wants to leave the dimension, and Mxyzptlk agrees to do it, but only if Jon picks the correct door. Jon picks the correct door, but he is back to where he was started.

Jon is transported to a blue dimension where he sees blue glowing pictures of his family. Back on Earth, Superman tries to get Lois to remember, but when Lois doesn't Superman gets angry and calls out Mxyzptlk who then appears and agrees to play a game with him. Both of them are transported in a different dimension, and Mxyzptlk admits that he can't seem to separate the two of them since their love is so powerful, while also revealing that Superman was split into two beings (pre-"Flashpoint" and New 52 Superman) which is the reason why Superman doesn't feel "whole". When New 52 Superman and Lois Lane died, they were made up of red energy while the current Superman and Lois Lane are made up of blue energy.

Jon Kent admits he misses his parents when red orbs come flying toward him, and it's revealed to be the New 52 Superman and Lois Lane. Mxyzptlk creates an enormous building that he calls "The Infinite Planet" and says that Jon is waiting for his parents at the very top. If Superman and Lois reach the top and reunite with Jon, Mxyzptlk will leave and never return; but if they fail, Jon will remain by Mxyzptlk's side forever and his parents will remain lost and forgotten. The terms are written in a contract that Superman and Lois reluctantly sign. The game begins and Mxyzptlk warns husband and wife that the higher they climb, the faster the blue energy they are composed will fade away. Superman and Lois beat the challenge, but Mxyzptlk accuses them of cheating and nearly kills them but Jon Kent breaks free of his prison touching his parents, but he transform them back to New 52 Superman and Lois Lane.

New 52 Superman and Lois Lane don't recognize Jon Kent (since they never had kids or were in a relationship) and Mxyzptlk tries to take Jon but New 52 Superman stops him. Jon sees blue orbs and realizes that they are his true parents souls and he blasts Mxyzptlk away. Mxyzptlk senses Jor-El found him and disappears. The Blue orbs merge with New 52 Superman and Lois Lane, and they both remember Jon Kent. The timelines from New 52 Superman and pre-Flashpoint Superman merge to form one new timeline with everyone regaining their memories of what happened before Flashpoint. The family escapes the dimension, and Mr. Oz congratulates the family before wondering if that someone has noticed what had happened.

=== Tie-in issues ===
==== New Super-Man ====
Kong Kenan is tricked by Lex Luthor into opening a doorway toward Hell, but Superman arrives and helps Kenan close the doorway and defeat the other demons. Kenan takes Superman out to eat, and Superman promises to teach Kenan his powers and be by his side when he needs help.

==== Supergirl ====
Superman meets up with Supergirl where she meets Jon Kent for the first time. While hanging out, Superman reveals to Supergirl that he was split into two beings by someone and the timeline has changed so that there were no two Supermen, just one. Superman warns her of Mister Oz, and Supergirl promises to take him down.

==== Superwoman ====
Lana Lang (who has received Kryptonian powers during "The Final Days of Superman" storyline) sees the ghosts of New 52 Superman and Lois Lane. Lana Lang's memory turns hazy and she realizes that there are two versions of Superman and Lois Lane, which is why the world seems so different to Lana. Lana Lang gives up her Kryptonian powers to New 52 Superman and Lois Lane (which allows them to physically appear with Jon Kent) but she is then trapped in a chamber.

Superman frees Lana Lang from her chamber, and the two of them talk over the difference in history before flying her over to Metropolis and convincing her to become Superwoman.

==== Trinity ====
Superman takes Wonder Woman and Batman to his Fortress and tells them about the last events in his life: his battle against Mister Mxyzptlk, where it was revealed he was split, and how he is whole again and the universe has been changed. Batman and Wonder Woman are visibly disturbed by those revelations. Diana sympathizes with Clark, but Bruce find Clark's story hard to believe and asks who else knows. Clark tells only his family knows: Lois and Jon were there, and he told Kara. Bruce advises to keep it that way for the present time, until they know something else about their mysterious enemy capable of altering reality at will.

== Critical reception ==
The main crossover received critical acclaim, with critics praising the artwork, original story, and the ending. Boyd Reynolds from CGM wrote that "Superman Reborn is a fun, quirky mini-series, pitting the Man of Steel against one of his most peculiar villains – Mr. Mxyzptlk".

According to Comic Book Roundup, Superman Vol. 4 #18 received a score of 8.4 out of 10 based on 24 reviews. Ryan L from ComicsTheGathering wrote: "This issue proves why Superman is one of the best series being released from DC. This story will be a crossover with Action Comics so get ready, this is going to be a crazy ride!"

According to Comic Book roundup, Action Comics #975 received a score of 8.6 out of 10 based on 21 reviews. David Brooke from AIPT wrote: "This is about as good as an anniversary issue can get while still progressing the storyline. There are fun homages, meta-nods, and cool reveals that should satiate even the more rabid of Superman fans. The art throughout this volume is top notch well worth the price of admission".

According to Comic BookRoundup, Superman #19 received a score of 8.2 out of 10 based on 19 reviews. Scott Cedarland from Newsarama wrote: "Peter Tomasi and Patrick Gleason are trying to pull a fast one over us and they're doing a pretty good job at it. As "Superman Reborn" continues, each new revelation is quickly followed by a new mystery".

According to Comic Book Roundup, Action Comics #976 received a score of 8.1 out of 10 based on 27 reviews. Brett from Graphic Policy wrote: "I'm blown away by the story which I can only describe as super. A fantastic ending that shows DC Comics has got a great grasp of mixing the old with the new".
