= Superman: Secret Origin =

Limited series comic book

- Cover of Superman: Secret Origin Deluxe Edition Hardcover (December 2010), art by Gary Frank.

Publication information
- Publisher: DC Comics
- Schedule: Irregular
- Format: Limited series
- Genre: Superhero
- Publication date: September 2009 – August 2010
- No. of issues: 6
- Main character(s): Clark Kent / Superman; Jonathan and Martha Kent; Legion of Super-Heroes; Lois Lane; Lex Luthor; Lana Lang; Jimmy Olsen; Parasite; Metallo

Creative team
- Written by: Geoff Johns
- Artist: Gary Frank
- Penciller: Jon Sibal

Collected editions
- Paperback: ISBN 978-0857-688-73-6
- Hardcover: ISBN 978-1401-226-97-8

Superman: Secret Origin is a six-issue monthly American comic book limited series published by DC Comics. The series was written by Geoff Johns and illustrated by Gary Frank, featuring the superhero Superman. The story featured the "definitive" origin of Superman for the modern, post-Infinite Crisis DC Universe continuity, starting with Clark Kent in his pre-teens as Superboy. Within the series he goes on to meet a young Lex Luthor and the Legion of Super-Heroes in Smallville, Kansas, and soon heads to Metropolis where a young adult Clark debuts as Superman.

The series featured new elements for the origin tale, such as telling the story from the singular perspective of Clark, and not having at least one scene set on the planet Krypton. The story instead begins with one of Clark's "earliest memories", in a story of Clark's "self-discovery and the world's story of meeting Superman".

== Plot ==
While playing football, a young Clark Kent accidentally breaks Pete Ross's arm. The next day, Clark panics when he discovers x-ray vision and nearly burns his school down with his heat vision. Clark's parents Jonathan and Martha Kent reveal to him he's an alien and show him the rocket that brought him to Earth. The ship reveals a holograph of Jor-El and Lara, who tell him about themselves and the planet he comes from: Krypton. Elsewhere in Smallville, a young Lex Luthor discovers a chunk of Kryptonite and takes it to a street fair the next morning where he is selling his stuff. There he meets Clark, who now wears glasses. After Clark becomes weak and almost damages the Kryptonite, a tornado appears without warning and he rescues Lana while learning he can fly.

Clark decides he wants to help people, and Martha makes an indestructible outfit based on the clothes from the rocket's holographic images. Clark tries it on and does not like it. A drunken Lionel Luthor, Lex's father, drives off a cliff but is rescued by Clark. Because he is embarrassed by the costume, he quickly disappears. Clark starts feeling sad and isolated from his human peers, when Cosmic Boy, Saturn Girl and Lightning Lad of the Legion of Super-Heroes appear. The Legionnaires bend their rules to take Clark to the future. Once they arrive, they fight a group of human supremacists, and Brainiac 5 angrily reminds them of the consequences of their actions. The Legion returns Clark to the present and leaves him with a Legion flight ring to which to communicate, though agreeing telepathically not to tell him about his future. Later, Clark stops a rocket heading toward their house to reveal Krypto inside. Meanwhile, upon hearing his father died from heart failure, a gleeful Lex Luthor plans to use Lionel's insurance policy to go to Metropolis.

Years later, a now adult Clark Kent walks around Metropolis, awestruck. Arriving at the dilapidated Daily Planet, he meets Rudy Jones, the overweight janitor, as well as photography intern Jimmy Olsen, Lois Lane, Perry White and the rest of the staff. Perry forbids Lois to get involved with billionaire and businessman Lex Luthor, who nearly killed the Planet financially because of a story they had about him. She ignores the warning and sneaks into Lexcorp, where Planet reporters are not welcomed. Once in there, she watches as Lex unveils Metallo, his powered exoskeleton battlesuit, but the security guards find her. She flees, but a mistake sends her falling from the roof. Clark changes into his costume and rescues her, revealing his alter ego to the public. While some are in awe of him, others are scared and the police question him. Clark flees, fearing that he has made a "big mistake".

Lex's daily tradition is to select someone from a crowd around his tower and provide them with a new life. One day, he chooses Rudy, brings him in and offers him all he can eat. He eats a donut that was dropped in bio-waste, which causes him to turn into a monster: the Parasite. Clark confronts Rudy and manages to freeze him. The people are grateful but don't know what to make of Clark. It becomes worse when Lex arrives and claims the "flying man" isn't even human. Clark leaves, and on the roof of the Daily Planet, sees Jimmy on the ledge. Jimmy is thinking of returning to New York, but Clark persuades him to stay, since he's his "only friend" in Metropolis, and lets Jimmy take his picture. The next issue of the Daily Planet runs with Lois's story and Jimmy's picture, naming "Superman" as the city's new savior. Lex, furious, declares a personal war on Perry White.

Later, a fire starts in the Daily Planet and Superman puts it out. Some clues indicate that it was arson. Public opinion is slowly improving on Superman thanks to the Planet, and their sales are rising. Lex calls upon General Sam Lane, Lois' father, who agrees to help him in exchange for high-tech weapons. Lex reveals that Superman is an alien, and can likely be stopped by kryptonite, the rock that also powers the Metallo battlesuit. Lois is greeted by Sgt. John Corben, with whom her father prefers she has a relationship. Lois refuses to date him, but John persists, and Clark steps in when Corben gets abusive.

John leaves to meet Lex and Sam and agrees to pilot Metallo. Clark takes Lois to lunch. Things are going well, when Clark hears an explosion and leaves to become Superman but the explosion was a fake; Sam Lane had caused it in order to meet Superman. Sam wants to know what his goals are, particularly with Lois, and threatens to declare him an enemy of the State. Superman ignores him and Lane orders the Army to attack. The soldiers do little to Superman, but John, in the Metallo suit, manages to weaken him by exposing him to the kryptonite. Ricocheting bullets hit the kryptonite, which explodes, injures John and allows Superman to escape. Sam and his troops arrive at the Daily Planet, and orders it shut down until they can get definitive answers about Superman.

Lex takes John into surgery and replaces his heart with a kryptonite generator, turning him into Metallo. Sam reveals to the Daily Planet staff that Superman is an alien. Soldiers find Superman in the sewers and the battle erupts onto one of the main streets of the city. Superman managed to subdue the military soldiers until Metallo appears, injuring his own soldiers in order to get into the fight. Superman and Metallo battled for the second time, with Metallo attacking Superman with a kryptonite ray, threatening the bystanders. Superman melts a manhole to cover the kryptonite and flies Metallo into space until the lack of oxygen knocks him out. Sam arrives and orders Superman and Lois arrested.

The crowd turns on the Army, and Superman orders the crowd to stop. He meets with Lex and tells him Metropolis does not belong to him anymore. Later, Lex goes to pick another person from the crowd to give a new life, only to find no one there. The Daily Planet celebrates becoming the top-selling newspaper in the city. Superman visits Lois atop the Daily Planet building, thanks her for making him feel like he belongs there and starts the Planet's rusty globe spinning again. Lois asks, "Are you a man or an alien?" His response is, "I'm Superman, Lois" and then flies across Metropolis.

== Background ==
In 2003–2004, DC Comics published a 12-issue limited series entitled Superman: Birthright, which touted itself as a new origin series that replaced the 1986 series The Man of Steel by writer/artist John Byrne. Birthright presented a number of changes to the continuity of Superman's origin. After the 2005–2006 event series Infinite Crisis, many new changes were made to the history of the DC Universe, including more alterations to Superman's origin, and at the time it was stated that both Man of Steel and Birthright were the "official" origin stories.

The truth was that after Infinite Crisis, Superman was without an "official" origin story as stated by then-monthly Superman writer Kurt Busiek. In order to definitively answer the glaring continuity questions, in 2009 DC enlisted the Action Comics creative team of writer Geoff Johns and artist Gary Frank (hot off their stories such as Superman and the Legion of Super-Heroes and Brainiac) to pen what was planned to be the "definitive" origin story of the modern Superman, post-Infinite Crisis.

As opposed to Green Lantern: Secret Origin (also penned by Johns), which ran in the monthly Green Lantern title, it was decided by Dan DiDio (then-executive editor of DC Comics) to have Secret Origin run as its own mini-series and not part of the regular Superman or Action Comics ongoing titles. It was during their run on Action that the pair of Geoff Johns and Gary Frank planned "Secret Origin", realizing that with stories such as Superboy and the Legion of Super-Heroes, or Superman's first encounters with the likes of Parasite for example, that there were not any modern retellings of those adventures, and planned them to be part of their origin storyline.

Johns planned their version of the origin story to be aligned with the modern stories, and as Man of Steel was "brilliant" and Birthright was a "beautiful book", Johns stated that this was not Smallville or Superman: The Movie, but Superman: Secret Origin by Johns and Frank. Johns also pointed out his love for "secret origins" because of how vital they are to the introduction of characters and mythology to the larger audience, in order to entice them into becoming a long time audience.

For Gary Frank, his reason for doing the series was because of "clarity": wanting enjoyment from readers, and not arguing what is and what isn't canon. An example being his version for Superman; being his own while giving the same feel to readers similar to the Curt Swan and Christopher Reeve Supermans. It was also because he and Johns shared the same vision that allowed them to work so well.

== Reception ==
The series was released to critical acclaim, with many critics citing Superman: Secret Origin as the definitive origin story for Superman. According to Comicbook Roundup, Superman: Secret Origin received an average rating of 8.6 out of 10 based on 47 reviews.

Reviewing each issue, IGN gave high praise to the overall series, with most of the individual issues receiving ratings between 7.8 and 9.0. They stated that Johns "wisely sticks closely to the play book of recognizable Superman tropes", making the story feel familiar and iconic without feeling stale. In the end, IGN said that despite being similar to previous Superman origin stories, they did not consider the comic to be problematic, due to Johns' ability to bring new personality and style to make it feel fresh while standing on its own.

Comic Book Resources gave each issue in the series between 3.5 and 5 stars, stating that Johns and Frank gave "the absolute version of Superman's origin" in the title. iFanboy gave the finale to the series full ratings, stating that the series as a whole is a "conservative" retelling when compared to Mark Waid and Leinil Yu's Superman: Birthright, in addition that "Secret Origin" provides a reexamination of Superman and his core relationships.

== Collected edition ==
The six-issue miniseries was collected as a deluxe hardcover titled Superman: Secret Origin - The Deluxe Edition (ISBN 1401226973) and was released on December 15, 2010, with a cover price of $29.99 US/$35.99 Canada.
