= The Man of Steel (comics) =

Comic book limited series featuring Superman

- Cover to The Man of Steel #1, art by John Byrne.

Publication information
- Publisher: DC Comics
- Schedule: Twice monthly
- Format: Limited series
- Publication date: July–September 1986
- No. of issues: 6
- Main character: Superman

Creative team
- Created by: John Byrne; Dick Giordano
- Written by: John Byrne
- Penciller: John Byrne
- Inker: Dick Giordano
- Letterer: John Costanza
- Colorist: Tom Ziuko
- Editor: Andy Helfer

Collected editions
- Superman: The Man of Steel Vol. 1 (softcover): ISBN 978-0930289287

The Man of Steel is a 1986 comic book limited series featuring the DC Comics character Superman. Written and drawn by John Byrne, the series was presented in six issues which were inked by Dick Giordano. The series told the story of Superman's modern origin, which had been rebooted following the 1985–1986 series Crisis on Infinite Earths.

DC editors wanted to make changes to the character of Superman, including making him the sole survivor of his home planet Krypton, and Byrne's story was written to show these changes and to present Superman's origin. The series includes the embryonic Kal-El rocketing away from the destruction of Krypton and his birth upon landing in Kansas when he emerged from the artificial womb, Clark Kent as a teenager in Smallville learning that he was found in a crashed space ship, him being hired at the Daily Planet in Metropolis, the creation of his secret identity of Superman, his first meeting with fellow hero Batman, and how he finally learned of his birth parents and from where he came. The series also included the reintroduction of a number of supporting characters, including fellow reporter and love interest Lois Lane and archenemy Lex Luthor, who was re-branded from a mad scientist to a powerful businessman and a white-collar criminal.

The series' legacy persisted, as it set the new status quo for all of the ongoing Superman comic series for many years after it was published. The story stayed in DC Comics continuity as the origin of Superman until it was expanded upon in the 2003 limited series Superman: Birthright, which stayed canon until 2009. The title is a reference to one of Superman's nicknames which touted his invulnerability as making him the "Man of Steel". It was later used as the title of an ongoing comic series and in a film reboot in 2013.

== Background ==
The character of Superman was created by Jerry Siegel and Joe Shuster. They originally intended for the character to star in a daily newspaper comic strip. He first appeared in the comic book, Action Comics #1, published in April 1938 by National Allied Publications (later renamed DC Comics). This book gave his origin, but was cut down to one page. Soon after his introduction, the character became very popular, and by summer of 1939 he was starring in not only Action Comics, but also his own self-titled comic Superman, becoming the first character successful enough to support two comic titles.

In the next few decades, Superman's story was expanded to include new characters and storylines. After Siegel and Shuster left, new writers and artists added their own ideas to the Superman mythos. In 1945, Superman's adventures as a boy in Smallville were introduced in More Fun Comics #101 with the concept of Superboy, while his status as the only survivor of Krypton's destruction changed in 1959 with the introduction of his cousin, Supergirl in Action Comics #252. Eventually, these new details began to conflict with earlier stories, especially with the transition of comics from the Golden Age of Comic Books to the Silver Age of Comic Books. New heroes were introduced and Superman joined with them as a full member of the Justice League of America, but his work with the previous generation of heroes in the Justice Society of America gave conflicting details of his story. These conflicts were resolved in an issue of The Flash #123, Flash of Two Worlds. The story introduced the idea of the DC Multiverse, which presented the idea that these original heroes from the Golden Age were from Earth-2, while the current generation of heroes were from Earth-1. This created an infinite number of worlds on which any number of conflicting stories could occur, which resolved many of these conflicts in the Superman mythos.

The multiverse, however, turned out to be too complicated for casual readers of comic books. DC Comics wanted more readers for their comics and decided that they would ease the confusion of new readers by getting rid of the multiverse. They would accomplish this in the 1985 limited series, Crisis on Infinite Earths. DC decided that with the series they could reboot the history of many of its characters, including Superman, leading to The Man of Steel.

== Production ==
In the years before Crisis on Infinite Earths led to the reboot of the DC Universe, DC editors and Marv Wolfman had been wanting to do a revision for Superman. Nothing was ever developed until then-publisher and president Jenette Kahn asked for revision proposals from various writers. While regular Superman writer Cary Bates wanted the revision to still keep the then-ongoing continuity as it was, Wolfman, and other writers such as Frank Miller and Steve Gerber wanted to restart the continuity from scratch. Wolfman, Miller, and Gerber all wanted to do the same thing: get rid of Clark Kent's career as Superboy, cut down Superman's powers, make changes in Lex Luthor's character, and make Superman the only survivor of Krypton, avoiding the other Kryptonian characters if necessary. Regardless of wanting the same things, however, the way each writer wanted to approach the revision was different.

After time had passed with no revision being granted the green light, executive editor Dick Giordano found out John Byrne was no longer under contract with Marvel Comics in May 1985. He and Byrne began talking about what Byrne would do with Superman if offered the job. With DC agreeing with 99% of the revision, Byrne was given the go-ahead for what became The Man of Steel. Byrne's original pitch was to mold Superman through a story arc over six or eight issues which would bring Superman to the point where he wanted him to be, but because DC insisted on a reboot, Byrne used that approach instead.

The mini-series was designed to reboot the Superman mythos using the history-altering effects of Crisis on Infinite Earths as an explanation. Thus, for modern comics, The Man of Steel is the dividing point between the previous canon of the Silver Age, and the Modern Age. The two different versions are referred to in stories soon after and by fans as "pre-Crisis" and "post-Crisis", per Crisis on Infinite Earths being the major dividing line across the DC Universe as a whole. The pre-Crisis stories were drawn to a close in Alan Moore's Superman: Whatever Happened to the Man of Tomorrow?.

In the first issue, during Superman's public debut, he was originally going to save a landing space shuttle. After the Space Shuttle Challenger disaster, the Constitution was changed to "an experimental space-plane".

== Story ==
The story was published in six issues from July to September 1986. Each issue focuses on a different time in the early years of Superman's career. In telling the story, Byrne drew from available media depictions of Superman for inspiration, including the Fleischer Studios cartoons and George Reeves' portrayal in the 1950s television series, Adventures of Superman.

=== Issue #1 ===
The first issue chronicles the origin of Superman, beginning with his flight from Krypton to his arrival on Earth where he is discovered by his adoptive parents, Jonathan and Martha Kent.

As a teenager, Clark Kent wins a high school football game almost by himself. He has developed many of his powers: stamina, great strength, X-ray vision, and flight. Jonathan reveals to him that he is not Jonathan and Martha's biological son; they found him in a crashed spaceship. Jonathan explains that Clark needs to use his powers more responsibly, not for his own benefit. Clark decides to anonymously help others, and for the next few years, while studying in university, he secretly saves lives and averts disasters. While in Metropolis, however, he openly prevents the crash of an experimental space plane, revealing his existence to the public. He meets Lois Lane and the two start to connect when a grateful mob of people surrounds them. Clark, unable to deal with the sudden attention, flies away to consult his parents. In order to preserve Clark's privacy, Jonathan suggests that Clark adopt a secret identity. Martha makes a costume for him, and he decides to use the name he was given by Lois, "Superman".

Clark's abilities are shown to have developed gradually in the yellow sun environment of Earth, starting with resistance to injury, with his flying ability emerging last. His powers do not reach their peak until his late teen years; thus, Clark only adopts the Superman identity in adulthood and never was Superboy.

In some pre-Crisis depictions, the Kents surrendered baby Kal-El to an orphanage before having a change of heart and legally adopting him as their own. Here, the Kents secretly adopt Clark and pass him off as their biological son. Prior to finding Clark, Martha Kent had a history of failed pregnancies. Friends and relatives assumed that they kept Martha's "pregnancy" a secret over fear of losing another child. A blizzard that closed off Smallville for 5 months (later revealed to have been caused by the Manhunters) also helped in the Kents' alibi.

While the pre-Crisis Superman's costume was indestructible, being made from the blankets in the rocket that brought him to Earth, the post-Crisis Superman costume is made of form-fitting ordinary spandex. It was later explained that the post-Crisis Superman's body generated an invisible "aura" that surrounded him and contributed to his bodily invulnerability. Objects held close to him, such as his costume (which attached to his skin), were protected from harm; his cape, meanwhile, could easily sustain damage in battle. The cape is also larger and longer. While keeping every classic element to the costume, Byrne made adjustments to the Superman S-shield. The emblem is an original design by Clark and Jonathan, and Byrne significantly increased its size so that it almost entirely covers Superman's chest.

=== Issue #2 ===
The next issue is set shortly after the first, where the costumed Superman debuts in Metropolis. Daily Planet managing editor Perry White assigns Lois Lane to get the full story on the new hero. In the meantime, Superman is all over Metropolis helping others, from stopping muggings to foiling bank robberies. After a series of failed attempts to even encounter him again, Lois decides to take a gamble and plunges her car into the harbor to lure Superman into the open. Her plan works, as Superman arrives and takes her back to her apartment. The pair have a quiet talk in which Superman vaguely reveals some details about himself, including confirming the name "Superman" that Lois gave him in her first article about him. Superman then departs, but not before asking Lois if she always carries an aqua-lung in her car. Lois finally has her scoop – the first sit-down interview with Superman – only to find out she's been beaten to the headline by the Daily Planet's newest reporter: Clark Kent.

In this series, Lois Lane was written as an aggressive reporter and personality from the start, and she never expressed a desire to find out Superman's identity or that he might have an alter-ego. Lois was given reddish-brown hair. Although she is clearly attracted to Superman, Lois is depicted as a driven career woman, with no thoughts of matrimony. She was also responsible for coming up with the name "Superman", as in other media iterations of the character (such as the film Superman and animated television series Superman: The Animated Series).

=== Issue #3 ===
Superman and Batman encounter each other for the first time after Superman has heard of a vigilante operating in Gotham City. Batman is on the trail of a criminal called Magpie when he is interrupted by Superman, who regards him as an outlaw. Rather than risk capture, Batman informs Superman that should the latter make any attempt to touch him, a signal will be activated triggering a hidden bomb that will kill an innocent person somewhere in the city. After Batman explains his motivations and outlook to Superman, the two then work together and eventually capture Magpie. Afterwards, they come to a mutual understanding of one another, then Batman reveals that the endangered person was Batman all along, which was the only way (at the time) that Batman had of keeping Superman at bay. Superman departs, cautioning Batman against crossing any further lines. Batman regards Superman privately as "a remarkable man, all things considered" and wonders if, in a different reality, they could have been friends.

Superman's relationship with Batman, which was friendly throughout most of the pre-Crisis period, became much more strained in later years, as each began disagreeing with the other's attitudes. This shift is reflected in Man of Steel, as it starts off with Batman and Superman initially at odds over their respective ideologies and approaches before just begin showing signs of developing a partnership, if not friendship. Batman's musing at the story's end is an allusion to their pre-Crisis friendship. Batman mentions that he had read Superman's debut in the Daily Planet news reports eight months ago.

=== Issue #4 ===
Lois and Clark are guests at a party being held on Lex Luthor's luxury oceanliner. Upon arriving, they are entertained by Luthor in his private chamber on the ship. When Luthor privately insinuates his desire for Lois to her, the latter is offended (having some knowledge of Luthor's past) and angrily decides to leave the ship, taking Clark with her. She and Clark are then confronted by South American terrorists, who promptly throw Clark overboard when he intervenes to protect Lois. As the terrorists cordon off the hostages, Clark changes to Superman and lifts the ship, which surprises everyone on board. Lois seizes the opportunity, fighting back and capturing the terrorists with a last-minute assist from Superman. Luthor then tries to put Superman on his personal retainer, which Superman declines. Luthor then reveals that he allowed the terrorists to attack just to see Superman in action for himself, to the outrage of everyone present. Superman is then deputized by the mayor of Metropolis to arrest Luthor for reckless endangerment, who is released hours later thanks to his legal team. A few days later, Luthor confronts Superman and warns him of a reckoning.

Superman's nemesis Lex Luthor was now no longer a mad scientist or a costumed supervillain with questionable motives. Instead, he is the new evil of the 1980s: a power-hungry businessman, "the most powerful man in Metropolis", who resents Superman's overshadowing presence. Instead of battling Superman directly, Luthor would now use hired minions, employ staff on his payroll, or manipulate others to destroy Superman, while ensuring that no incidents could be conclusively linked to him. Clark mentions that it has been almost eighteen months since he beat Lois to the scoop on Superman.

=== Issue #5 ===
The story begins with Superman confronting Luthor after foiling another of the latter's revenge schemes, but Luthor is able to elude arrest when Superman is unable to tie the villain to his criminal act. Superman leaves but not before his body is scanned by Dr. Teng's cloning machine. Due to Superman's alien heritage, the machine is unable to duplicate his DNA as it can only recognize known life-forms. At first the clone appears to be a perfect duplicate of Superman until it keels over unconscious and its body starts to crystallize. Frustrated, Luthor orders the body to be disposed of. Days later, the duplicate resurfaces thinking it is Superman and helping Metropolitans. The people, upon seeing it, flee in fear. It later meets a blind Lucy Lane, Lois's sister, who attempted to commit suicide by jumping off a building. Superman encounters the creature and engages it in battle. The fight ends in a final blow, shattering the imperfect duplicate into a dust cloud which absurdly restores Lucy's sight.

On the opening page of this issue, Superman is seemingly capturing Luthor, who is wearing his pre-Crisis power suit, but the next page reveals that it is one of Luthor's pawns in the suit. Luthor claims that the suit had been stolen and that he had no knowledge of the plot to attack Superman, but the suit's systems have left the man inside a vegetable, unable to tell the truth of Luthor's involvement. The reader later learns that Luthor was responsible for all of the above, which Superman suspects. Additionally, through Dr. Teng's examination, Luthor is among the first to discover that Superman is not human, but an alien. Superman is still, at this point, unaware of his extraterrestrial origins, much as his Golden Age version did not learn the truth about his past until well into his adulthood.

The villain Bizarro was established as an imperfect clone of Superman, created from the superhero's DNA, rather than as a duplicate resulting from an imperfect duplicating ray. Furthermore, Bizarro is no longer an "imperfect opposite" of Superman and as such, has identical rather than opposite powers. Though the duplicate is referred to as "bizarre" in-story, it is never explicitly named "Bizarro"; that name will not be established post-Crisis until years later, when another imperfect duplicate created by the same process runs rampant in Metropolis. Lois mentions that she has been dreaming of kissing Superman for five years now, indicating that he has been active in Metropolis at least that long at this point. The restoration of Lucy's sight is an element borrowed from Bizarro's first appearance in Superboy #68, right down to the dust cloud. It is implied that the duplicate deliberately sacrifices itself after hearing that Lucy's sight began to improve after contact with the creature.

=== Issue #6 ===
Clark returns to Smallville after a long time away. His adoptive parents pick him up. Jonathan Kent is about to tell him something but Martha shushes him. Later that night, Clark is unable to sleep as he wonders what his Pa Kent was about to tell him. When he goes for a midnight snack, a "ghost" of Jor-El appears and touches him. Superman discovers himself to be on an alien planet where he encounters his biological mother, Lara. As the hallucination wears off, he is face to face with his old flame, Lana Lang. In a flashback, it turns out that on the night that Clark learned his heritage he went to Lana and revealed the truth of his powers to her. She confesses her feelings to him. She realizes that Clark can no longer belong to her, that he belongs to the world and this fact had hurt her. She had gone through a period of depression and finally accepts the fact. The next day, Superman thinks about what she said and starts wondering about where he truly came from. He goes to the location where Jonathan hid the rocket ship he was found in only to find that the ship is gone. The hologram of Jor-El reappears and tells him to be silent and to learn. It appears that Superman is under some kind of psionic attack but the Kents arrive in time and break it off. Superman flies away, realizing that it was not a mental attack but a download of knowledge of everything about Krypton into his brain. He finally knows his biological parents and where he came from and though he appreciates the knowledge he has been given, in the end, he embraces his humanity ever more.

As opposed to the earlier version, where others such as Supergirl and Krypto also survived, Superman is portrayed as the sole survivor of Krypton's destruction. He has no memory of his existence on Krypton, and instead identifies as a citizen of Earth. Pre-Crisis, Pete Ross knows of Clark's abilities since they are teenagers, while Lana Lang suspects Clark of being Superboy. Post-Crisis, Pete learns this information much later. Instead, Clark reveals his abilities to Lana just before leaving Smallville, and, while she retains feelings for him, has come to terms with the fact that they will merely be friends, and no longer pursues him as she did pre-Crisis. Clark's adoptive parents are alive and well into his adulthood, and Clark visits them periodically. Pre-Crisis, they had died shortly after Clark's high school graduation. Clark is twenty-eight years old by the time the story ends, indicating that the six issues had taken place over ten years.

== Collected editions ==
The story has been reprinted in trade paperback form in several editions. With the release of Action Comics #584, Adventures of Superman #424, and Superman #1 in October 1986 there was a card in each copy that readers could fill out and mail to DC for a chance to win a rare copy of a collected trade paperback. This version was unique in that it was actually all six issues of the Man of Steel mini-series with the spines trimmed and rebound with a new cover with a photocopied note that read:

Congratulations!
Your entry has been selected to receive a copy of the "MAN of STEEL" special edition-the entire six issue mini-series bound between two covers.
Thank you for responding to our contest and your continued support of SUPERMAN and DC Comics.
Sincerely,
Dale A. Kanzler

In 1987 it was first released as a trade paperback in deluxe paper for the mass market with new cover art by John Byrne, with a foreword Ray Bradbury and an introduction by Byrne, with a cover price $12.95 US/$17.50 Canada (ISBN 0-930289-28-5). In February 1988, Ballantine Books published a trade paperback with different cover art by artist Arne Starr (based on the concept to Byrne's variant cover to The Man of Steel #1) with this edition re-titled as Superman: The Man of Steel (ISBN 0-345-35093-6). In 1993, it was widely released using newsprint-type paper with a lower cover price of $7.50 US/$9.95 Canada, with this edition being the fourth printing using an all black front cover art with the Superman 'S' shield logo displayed (ISBN 0-930289-28-5). It was re-released again in 2003 with a fifth printing, with a cover price of $9.95 US/$15.25 Canada (with subsequent printings going up in cover price to $14.99 US/$17.99 Canada by 2013 with the eighth printing) with new cover art by Jerry Ordway and under the new title of Superman: The Man of Steel Vol. 1 (ISBN 978-0930289287), which would be the first in a series of trade paperbacks to collect some of the early post-Crisis era adventures of Superman.

- The Man of Steel (trade paperback, 152 pages, 1993 (fourth printing), DC Comics, ISBN 0-930289-28-5)
- Superman: The Man of Steel Vol. 1 (trade paperback 132 pages, October 2003 (fifth printing onwards), DC Comics, ISBN 978-0930289287)
- Secret Origins of The World's Greatest Super-Heroes (ISBN 0930289501) (1990). Among the selected stories reprinted was The Man of Steel #6.

The story has also been released in other countries. In 1995, Battleaxe Press comics in South Africa published the series under the name Superman as an introduction to the character before publishing newly released comics from DC.

In Mexico, Grupo Editorial Vid released the "Man of Steel" mini series as part of a new "Superman" comic book bi weekly series, starting with a new #1 issue, launched in november, 1986. It was the second volume of the series after the original series ended on april, 1985, when former publisher, Editorial Novaro went out of business.

== Impact ==
From 1986 until 2003, The Man of Steel was the official Superman origin story. The 1998 limited series, Superman for All Seasons added to the story, but did not remove it from continuity. Byrne followed the story with three four-issue mini-series that retold and explored the new world of Superman: The World of Krypton (December 1987 – March 1988), The World of Smallville (April – July 1988), and The World of Metropolis (August – November 1988). In addition to these stories, three on-going monthly comics featuring the new Superman's adventures were published by DC Comics. Byrne continued his stories in the brand new Superman #1, and continued with Action Comics #584, while Marv Wolfman wrote Adventures of Superman which had been retitled from the original Superman book and began with #424.

Byrne and Wolfman continued the changes presented in The Man of Steel in these on-going stories. Although most of Superman's powers remained unchanged, they did become limited to make him more believable. Additionally, he could no longer survive in space indefinitely without an air supply. These changes eliminated intergalactic and time travel stories. They also wanted to establish Clark Kent as the real person, with Superman being the disguise. Clark was no longer "mild-mannered", but became more assertive. He worked out to explain his muscular build and had written a "best-selling" novel before becoming a Daily Planet reporter. Additionally, most stories of other characters trying to find out Superman's secret identity were eliminated, as it was not believed that he had an alter-ego. Byrne also decided to keep Jonathan and Martha alive and well into Clark's adulthood to be important support characters for years. He also limited the use of Superman's weakness, kryptonite. He removed all other forms besides the green variety, and made it an extremely rare element that came to Earth in one large rock with Superman's rocket. Lex Luthor believed early on that the radiation emanating from kryptonite was within safe limits for humans, but was proved wrong in later stories.

Two of the biggest changes to Superman was reestablishing him as the sole survivor of the planet Krypton and the removal of his career as Superboy. These alterations in continuity would have a serious effect on the Legion of Super-Heroes. The Legion was formed based on the legends of Superman's adventures as a boy, and since they were still in continuity this was a problem. Additionally, Supergirl visited and worked with the Legion in many of their stories. Since Supergirl did not exist either, Byrne had to correct this incongruity. He created a storyline in his two books where the Legion travels back in time to confront the post-Crisis Superman to find an explanation on Superboy's apparent disappearance. It was revealed that the Legion's enemy, the Time Trapper had created a "pocket universe" where Superboy existed. Whenever that Superboy would travel to the future or the Legion would travel to the past, the Time Trapper shifted them in and out of the pocket universe. This would also be used to explain the existence of Supergirl in the Legion stories.

One change of the Superman mythos introduced by Byrne was that Kal-El was not an infant sent from Krypton to Earth, rather, his fetus was placed in a "birthing matrix" equipped with a rocket engine and Jor-El's experimental warp drive, with Kal-El gestating during the trip to Earth. Once the rocket landed, Kal-El was fully "born" on Earth. This made him "born" an American, a plot point that would be used in Armageddon 2001, a DC Comics storyline which explored possible futures, one of which featured Superman becoming President of the United States.

The planet Krypton in this series is cold and emotionally sterile, an idea Byrne borrowed from the 1978 film Superman and later carried on by other writers.

The Man of Steel was highly regarded as an origin story for Superman. The first issue sold 200,000 copies. The cover to that issue was named one of the "75 Most Iconic DC Covers of All-Time" by Comic Book Resources, while users on that site voted it (along with the rest of Byrne's Superman run) as one of the "Top 100 Comic Book Runs" in 2012. Issue #3, where Superman met Batman, was named by IGN as one of "The Greatest Superman/Batman Stories". The website io9 called the mini-series "Must Read", while others gave many examples of why it is loved.

Although many people praised the story, it did have some detractors. Some claimed the series discarded the true Superman, while others claimed that DC and Byrne did not understand the character of Superman. Others have given examples of why the new Superman was overthought and did not work as a character.

== Legacy ==
In 2003, the story was finally replaced by the 12-issue limited series, Superman: Birthright, which added on elements to the origin story of Superman. DC stated that Birthright and The Man of Steel formed the full "official" origin for Superman. Birthright made use of many elements of The Man of Steel that tied into the other series, but also introduced new aspects ignored by Byrne and thus brought back various pre-Crisis elements (such as Lex and Clark as childhood friends in Smallville). The Kara Zor-El version of Supergirl was also reintroduced. In 2005, the DC Universe spanning story, Infinite Crisis made further changes to Superman, which left questions once again about Superman's origin. It was not until then-monthly Superman writer Kurt Busiek stated that the post-Infinite Crisis Superman origin had yet to be established. After the conclusion of Infinite Crisis, this origin was finally explained in the 2009 mini-series Superman: Secret Origin ending 20 years of The Man of Steel being the official origin. Eventually, only the first post-Crisis encounter between Superman and Batman remained canonical.

Many of the elements of the story were used in various other stories about the character. Other comic book series referred to it, such as the adaptation Superman: Earth One, which includes Clark Kent getting a job with the Daily Planet by providing an exclusive interview with Superman and the Elseworlds story Superman: Last Son of Earth which heavily refers to it and includes some frames and quotes copied directly from it.

Other elements were not seen in the story, but were adapted when Superman's origin was tackled by other media besides comics. In some pre-Crisis re-tellings of Superman's origin, Jor-El wanted to save both Lara and Kal-El by sending them away in the same rocket. Lara refused saying that the rocket was too small and might not make it to Earth because of her added weight, and she wanted to stay with her husband, an idea that was briefly touched on in Superman: The Animated Series. Byrne's original idea was to show a pregnant Lara leaving Krypton. After landing near Smallville, Lara would immediately succumb to a small chunk of kryptonite that was embedded in the ship's hull, introducing the dangers of the rocks. Lara would then have been found by the Kents while she was in labor. Before dying, Lara would have told them to look after her son. They would then take young Kal-El, an alien born on Earth, and raise him as their own just as they promised his mother. This was also Byrne's way to emphasize the Kents being chosen caretakers rather than them being a random couple who finds a baby in a rocket. The idea was not used because DC wanted Kal-El to be sent to Earth alone, but the idea of them being chosen was explored later in the television series, Smallville and in the novel Superman: Last Son of Krypton. The only detail from the idea that remained in the finished comic is the kryptonite fragment embedded in the ship's hull, which weakens Clark just as Jonathan finishes his story.

According to Byrne, it was initially agreed upon that he could depict Superman "learning the ropes" as a young hero early in his career. This was part of the reason why Byrne eliminated Superboy from the mythos, as he felt Superboy would be an unnecessary character under those circumstances. Once Byrne officially signed on to write the story, however, he was informed that his Superman would need to be "up to speed" and an established hero by the time the relaunch of the monthly titles took place. Later, Byrne stated that he wished he had kept Superboy to fill the role of Superman still "figuring it out", but this idea was used extensively in the Smallville television series.

An unused Marv Wolfman idea was to show Lois Lane and Lex Luthor being romantically involved and living together in Luthor's estate in the mountains until Superman came to Metropolis. Lois would then leave Luthor to go after Superman, another reason for Luthor to hate Superman. This idea was scrapped because Byrne did not want Lois as someone who was drawn to power (and he did not want any mountains shown alongside the city either). Therefore, The Man of Steel depicts Lois and Luthor as having only casually dated. This idea was explored during the first season of the television series, Lois & Clark: The New Adventures of Superman, and was a backstory in Superman: The Animated Series.

The title of the series was used once again in 1991 when DC gave Superman a fourth on-going monthly comic book, Superman: The Man of Steel. It was also used for the rebooted film franchise of Superman in the 2013 origin story film, Man of Steel. The dystopian view of Krypton in the film is also heavily influenced by John Byrne's mini series, in which Kryptonians ruined their ecology and no longer have natural child birth.

The Man of Steel was later the name of a 2018 miniseries written by Brian Michael Bendis, Bendis' first major work for DC Comics.

== In other media ==
In 1990, the series was adapted into a radio play in England simply entitled The Adventures of Superman by Dirk Maggs for BBC Radio 4. It featured Stuart Milligan as Clark Kent / Superman, William Hootkins as Lex Luthor, Lorelei King as Lois Lane, Vincent Marzello as Jimmy Olsen, Garrick Hagon as Perry White, Shelley Thompson as Lana Lang, Dick Vosburgh as Jor-El, Barbara Barnes as Lucy Lane, David Graham as Fisher, Simon Treves as Metallo, Elizabeth Mansfield as Amanda McCoy, Burt Kwouk as Doctor Teng, and Jon Pertwee as Schwarz.
