= Green Lantern: Earth One =

2018–2020 DC Comics graphic novel series

- Cover for Volume One, art by Gabriel Hardman

Publication information
- Publisher: Earth One (DC Comics)
- Genre: Science fiction; Superhero
- Publication date: March 20, 2018 (Volume One); August 11, 2020 (Volume Two)
- Main character(s): Hal Jordan; Kilowog; Arisia Rrab; John Stewart; Sinestro; Guardian

Creative team
- Writer(s): Gabriel Hardman; Corinna Bechko
- Artist(s): Gabriel Hardman

Green Lantern: Earth One is a series of original graphic novels published by DC Comics as part of the Earth One line. The series is written by Gabriel Hardman and Corinna Bechko, with art by Hardman. Volume One of the series was released on March 20, 2018, while Volume Two was released on August 11, 2020.

== Publication history ==
Green Lantern: Earth One is the fifth original graphic novel by DC Comics as part of the Earth One line of graphic novels established in 2009. It follows the releases of Superman: Earth One, Batman: Earth One, Teen Titans: Earth One, and Wonder Woman: Earth One.

== Plot summary ==
=== Volume One ===
In the near future, companies like Ferris Galactic engage in deep-space mining operations. As the crew of the Ferris 6 prepares to come home, ex-pilot turned mining worker Hal Jordan, and crewman Volkov discover an alien spaceship buried within an asteroid. Inside, there is a deactivated robot, a dead alien, a power battery in the shape of a Lantern, and a ring. The structure collapses, but they manage to escape with the battery and ring. Back on their ship, Jordan reports their findings to the rest of the crew. Meanwhile, Volkov tries on the ring, triggering an energy blast that breaks the hull and kills him. Jordan is shocked, but takes the ring, which allows him to survive in space. The crew, fearful of possible radiation exposure, forbid Jordan from entering their ship. Just then, the robot is reactivated and attacks Jordan. Almost dying, Jordan uses all of his energy from the ring to destroy the robot and is blasted into outer space.

Jordan wakes up on the planet Bolovax Vik and meets with resistant Kilowog, who explains that the ring and the power battery belong to the Green Lantern Corps. The Corps used to be a peacekeeping space force until they were all hunted down by the same robots Jordan fought: the Manhunters. Kilowog also carries a ring, passed down through generations. He teaches Jordan how to use his, from flying to defensive attacks. Their actions are caught by the Bolovax Homeguard, whose General orders Jordan to be taken into custody, due to their dangerous actions. The Manhunters later attack the Homeguard to get Jordan and Kilowog. Kilowog is about to get killed in the fight when Jordan takes him and flees. Kilowog is upset, as leaving a fight is seen as cowardice. Jordan and him decide to seek the help of whichever Lantern is still alive.

The two eventually find Green Lantern Arisia Rrab. She refuses to join, as she has lost all hope of fighting the Manhunters. They then find Veca Trana, whose late partner was a Lantern. Veca reveals that the Guardians of the Universe, who founded the Corps, created the Manhunters to destroy the Green Lanterns. Jordan and Kilowog give up and get drunk at a space station. There, Jordan reveals how hard it is for him to trust people. He used to work for NASA to develop Arrowhead, an orbiting platform that was used to attack its own people. Because Jordan trusted the wrong people and did not speak up, he ran away instead. Just then, Jordan is alerted about the approaching Manhunters, only to get knocked out.

Jordan awakes on the planet Oa, home of the Central Battery, and is now a slave of the Manhunters. Another slave steals his ring, but fails to breach the barrier housing the Central Battery and is killed by the Manhunters. Jordan recovers the ring and pass the barrier. Using his ring, he meets with the last Guardian, who tells him to free the Central Battery and use it to contact the other Lanterns and destroy Oa, the Manhunters, and everyone else. Jordan refuses and, with his ring fully charged, easily destroys the approaching Manhunters, but is overwhelmed and escapes. Being reminded of his cowardice, he decides to harness his bravery and sends a distress call to all surviving Lanterns to return to Oa.

Jordan starts a fight with the other Manhunters, and just when he is about to die, Kilowog and the other Green Lanterns, including Arisia and Veca Trana, arrive. They destroy the barrier together, freeing the Central Battery. They then debate what comes next, some agreeing with the plan to use the Central Battery to destroy Oa, including the innocent slaves, but Jordan wants a better course of action. With the entire army of Manhunters coming, they decide to use the Battery, but control the blast's direction so that it only destroys the Manhunters. Veca dies in the ensuing battle and Jordan elects a random slave to become a new Green Lantern. They then fight together as a team, electing Arisia as the Corps' leader due to her experience, and destroy the Manhunter's grasp on the universe.

The Guardian reveals his disgust at Jordan for disobeying him. In a secret location, he reveals his new Yellow Lantern Corps. Jordan returns to Earth, meeting with his Captain, Amy Seaton, who is surprised to see him alive. Jordan reveals there is more out there, and now they have the tools to take care of the job, as he reveals himself as a Green Lantern.

=== Volume Two ===
Nearly three years after Hal Jordan's return to Earth, humanity joins the intergalactic community. While an interplanetary trade deal is being negotiated, a Llaran envoy ship blows up. Believing Earth to be responsible, the Llarans fire at the humans. Jordan tries to stop the fight, but the damage is then exacerbated by Global Central Command (CENTCOM) fighting back. The Llarans withdraw their ships from Earth, taking human representatives Ngendo Muturi, Sophie Rivas, and John Stewart as hostages. The incident puts Earth in an intergalactic crisis, as word of humanity starting the fight spreads. Soon after, CENTCOM orders Jordan to surrender to their custody. He refuses and goes to the Jordan Aeronautics R&D Facility on the moon. Now a wanted fugitive, he requests Amy Seaton to evacuate the base and get rid of their prototype interstellar ship, not wanting its advanced schematics to fall into CENTCOM's hands.

Wanting to save the hostages, Jordan travels to Llaran Prime and is confronted by warships and someone with a yellow power ring. The Yellow Lantern declares to be the defender of Llaran Prime's sector, and demands that Jordan leave. Knowing that fighting back will only provoke a war, Jordan complies. Meanwhile, several Yellow Lanterns start appearing throughout the galaxy. They later go to Oa and destroy every Manhunter in existence. Their leader, The Last Guardian, wants to bring order to the galaxy with the power of his yellow rings, which are more powerful than the green ones. He asks the Green Lanterns to join him. Jordan, Arisia, and most of the Corps decline his offer. Some members, including Sinestro, willingly join the Yellow Lanterns.

Meanwhile, Llaran Prime's Yellow Lantern frees the hostages. He turns out to be the one who destroyed the Llaran ship and feels guilty. He reveals the Yellow Lanterns came from Qward, a planet in another dimension where they were a systematically oppressed people. The Guardian gave them rings to defeat their oppressors. Owing a debt to him, the Qwardians joined him. The Lantern gives the humans his ring and battery and leaves to find some way to repent and help the Llarans. Back on Earth's moon, Seaton and a crew fly off the prototype starship into deep space, escaping from CENTCOM.

Against Arisia's words, Jordan heads back to Earth. While he is travelling, the Yellow Lanterns start attacking Green Lanterns on their respective worlds. At the same time, the Guardian cuts off the Green Lanterns' access to the Central Battery by teleporting it to Qward's dimension. Without it, they are depowered and easily killed by the Yellow Lanterns. After energizing his ring one last time, Jordan meets the former Llaran hostages. They all want to stop the Guardian. Using the yellow ring, they find Seaton and the others. After repairing their ship, Jordan and the company decide to fly to Oa and kill the Guardian.

Muturi manages to contact the Llarans and get their help, while Stewart uses the yellow ring to look for the Guardian's location in Oa. The Yellow Lanterns start attacking heroes and teleport Jordan to a ship. There, the Guardian shows Jordan an interdimensional rift. Krona, a previous Oan, once tried to alter time and the universe itself, but shattered it. The Guardian believes that he can recreate that experiment and shape the universe through his expertise and Jordan's moral compass, creating a reality free of war and pain. Jordan refuses, believing his plan to be insane.

The Llaran reinforcements soon arrive with the Bolovax Homeguard, Kilowog, and Arisia. Realizing that they had been lied to by the Guardian, Sinestro and the other former Green Lanterns abandon the Yellow Lanterns. The Guardian teleports the ship to the Qwardian dimension and escapes. Inside the ship, Jordan's ring is fully recharged by the Central Battery in the Qwardian dimension. This allows him to destroy the dimensional rift, which implodes with the Guardian stuck inside it. The rift then collapses, seemingly killing Jordan.

With the Guardian dead, the Qwardian Yellow Lanterns break off their attack. Being unable to return to their world, they lay claim of Oa as a refuge. The rest of the Yellow Lanterns feel complicit in the slaughter that took place and decide to go protect their homes and live a quiet life. The Green Lanterns and Jordan's friends return home, while Muturi plans on staying with the Llarans as an ambassador for Earth. Meanwhile, the Global Central Command, which turns out to be an ally of the Guardian, loses control of Earth after the Yellow Lanterns disband. CENTCOM's leader, General Jask, goes into hiding while different factions take advantage of the chaos. John Stewart sets up an appointment with Carol Ferris, offering to continue Ferris Galactic's work as Jordan had asked him to.

Three years later, on the planet Qward, a city is under attack. A Qwardian runs to a building with the Central Battery nearby, crying out for the "Guardian's" help. Coming from out of the building in a green streak of light, Hal Jordan, very much alive, flies off to save the day while insisting that people stop calling him Guardian.

== Reception ==
Jesse Schedden of IGN gave the title a positive review, stating that "in a lot of ways, Green Lantern: Earth One is DC's most successful addition to the line yet. It shows a willingness to subvert expectations and reinvent a character who's remained very locked in one particular course for the past 14 years. The familiar problems remain in terms of pacing and structure, but this is clearly a story that deserves to be continued". He also stated that "like all of DC's Earth One graphic novels, Green Lantern: Earth One offers a streamlined, continuity-free take on the title character. Generally, these books haven't strayed too far from the norm. The biggest change in Batman: Earth One is the fact that the Dark Knight is more incompetent than his traditional counterpart, while Wonder Woman: Earth One made waves largely by resurrecting the character's Golden Age trappings and bondage subtext. Green Lantern: Earth One feels like the first case where the creators really tried to fundamentally rethink the character and the universe in which they operate". GamesRadar+'s Pierce Lydon gave a positive review to the Volume Two, but thought that it does not add anything new compared to the first volume.

== In other media ==
In the DC Universe (DCU) television series Lanterns, the design of the Green Lantern uniforms and tone of the series is mainly inspired by those in Green Lantern: Earth One.

== See also ==
- Green Lantern (comic book)
