= Earth-One =

Fictional setting in comic books published by DC Comics

- First appearance: The Flash #123 (September 1961); Pre-Crisis version: Detective Comics #225 (November 1955, retroactive); Post-Crisis version: 52 #52 (July 2007)
- Created by: Gardner Fox
- Races: Humans, Amazons, Kryptonians, Atlanteans
- Character: Silver Age Justice League of America
- Publisher: DC Comics

Earth-One (also Earth-1) is a name given to two fictional universes (the Pre-Crisis and Post-Crisis versions of the same universe) that have appeared in American comic book stories published by DC Comics. The first Earth-One was given its name in Justice League of America #21 (August 1963), after The Flash #123 (September 1961) explained how Golden Age (Earth-Two) versions of characters such as the Flash (Jay Garrick) could appear in stories with their Silver Age counterparts (Barry Allen). This Earth-One continuity included the DC Silver Age heroes, including the Justice League of America.

Earth-One, along with the four other surviving Earths (Earth-Two, Earth-Four, Earth-S, and Earth-X) of the DC Multiverse, are merged into one in the 1985 miniseries Crisis on Infinite Earths. This Earth's versions of characters were primarily the Earth-One versions (i.e. Superman, Batman), but some characters from the four other worlds were also "folded" in. In Infinite Crisis, Earth-One was resurrected and merged with the primary Earth of the publication era to create a New Earth that brought back more aspects of Earth-One's original history. In 2007, a new version of Earth-One was created in the aftermath of events that occurred within the 52 series.

== Pre-Crisis version ==
=== Flash of Two Worlds ===
The Flash (September 1961), cover art by Carmine Infantino and Murphy Anderson

Characters from DC Comics were originally suggestive of each existing in their own world, as superheroes never encountered each other. This was soon changed with alliances being formed between certain protagonists. Several publications, including All-Star Comics (publishing tales of the Justice Society of America), Leading Comics (publishing tales of the Seven Soldiers of Victory) and other comic books introduced a "shared-universe" among several characters during the 1940s until the present day.

Alternative reality Earths had been used in DC stories before, but were usually not referred to after that particular story. Also most of these alternative Earths were usually so vastly different that no one would confuse that Earth and its history with the so-called real Earth. That would change when the existence of another reliable Earth was established in a story titled "Flash of Two Worlds" in which Barry Allen, the modern Flash later referred to as Earth-One (the setting of the Silver Age stories) first travels to another Earth, accidentally vibrating at just the right speed to appear on Earth-Two, where he meets Jay Garrick, his Earth-Two counterpart.

=== Major events ===
- More Fun Comics #101 (1945): The first appearance of Superboy. According to canon, the Superman of Earth-Two did not fight crime until reaching Metropolis as an adult, therefore this is the first appearance of Earth-One in comics.
- Superman #76 (1952): The first appearance of the Earth-One Batman, teaming up with what must be Earth-One Superman. The two crime fighters meet for the first time in this story. Their Earth-Two counterparts knew each other from their time in the Justice Society of America in the 1940s (New York World's Fair Comics #2 (July 1940) contained the first published picture of Batman (Earth-Two) and Superman (Earth-Two) together).
- Superman's Pal Jimmy Olsen #1 (1954): Debut issue of spinoff title for supporting character from the Superman series. Superman and Batman books unofficially switch from the Earth-Two characters to the Earth-One characters, though it was not apparent at the time.
- Detective Comics #225 (1955): The first appearance of J'onn J'onzz, the Martian Manhunter.
- Showcase #4 (1956): Popularly the first Earth-One comic (though not mentioned in text as such), featuring the introduction of Barry Allen as The Flash.
- Adventure Comics #246 (1958): Unofficially the first appearance of Earth-One Green Arrow.
- Wonder Woman #98 (1958): Unofficially the first appearance of Earth-One Wonder Woman. (See also Wonder Woman (Earth-Two).)
- Adventure Comics #260 (1959): The first appearance of Earth-One Aquaman.
- Showcase #22 (1959): The first appearance of Hal Jordan, the Green Lantern of Earth-One.
- The Brave and the Bold #34 (1961): The first appearance of Katar Hol, the Hawkman of Earth-One.
- The Flash #123 (1961): "The Flash of Two Worlds", a story in which Barry Allen meets Jay Garrick. This is the first story to explain the concept of the Multiverse, namely that the two Flashes inhabited separate but similar Earths.
- Showcase #34 (1961): The first appearance of Ray Palmer, the Atom of Earth-One.
- Justice League of America #21 (1963): "Crisis on Earth-One", the first team-up between the JLA and the JSA, which became a yearly feature in the Justice League of America comic. This is the story in which both Earth-One and Earth-Two were first given names.
- Green Lantern (vol. 2) #85 (1971): "Snowbirds Don't Fly", a story focusing on drug addiction, showing Green Arrow's ward Roy Harper addicted to heroin. The story won the 1971 Shazam Award for Best Original Story.
- Justice League of America #100 (1972), the story that establishes that the Green Arrow and Speedy appearing in the 1940s were the Earth-2 Green Arrow and Speedy. This annual JLA/JSA team-up featured the return of the Golden Age superhero team the Seven Soldiers of Victory, of which the Golden Age Green Arrow and Speedy were members.
- Swamp Thing #1 (1972): The first appearance of Alec Holland, the Swamp Thing. The story won the 1972 Shazam Award for Best Original Story.
- Justice League of America #244 and Infinity, Inc. #19 (1985): The final team-up of the Justice League and the Justice Society before Earth-One and Earth-Two are merged.
- Crisis on Infinite Earths #10 (1986): The issue in which Earth-One, Earth-Two, Earth-Four (the home of the Charlton Comics heroes), Earth-S (the home of the Fawcett Comics heroes), and Earth-X (the home of the Quality Comics heroes) were combined into one reality, known as New Earth.
- DC Comics Presents #97 (1986): "Phantom Zone: The Final Chapter", the last official Earth-One story.
- Superman #423 and Action Comics #583 (1986): "Whatever Happened to the Man of Tomorrow?", a non-canonical story meant to serve as a closure for the Earth-One Superman. The story features cameos by several other Earth-One heroes.

=== Destruction ===
Crisis on Infinite Earths (1985–1986) was an effort by DC Comics to clean up their continuity, resulting in the multiple universes, including that of Earth-One, combining into one. This involved the destruction of the multiverse, including Earth-One and the first appearance of the post-Crisis Earth.

== Post-52 version ==
At the end of Infinite Crisis, the realigned world is called "New Earth". There are now 52 universes: "New Earth" (a.k.a. Earth-0), and Earths-1 to 51. In the final issue of the 52 weekly series, it is revealed that fifty-two duplicate worlds have been created and all but New Earth have been altered from the original incarnation.

Earth-1 is featured in the Superman: Earth One and Batman: Earth One graphic novels.

== Characters ==
| Earth-One (1961–1985) | Notes | New Earth / Prime Earth counterpart |
|---|---|---|
| Kal-El/Clark Kent | Since Superman was one of several DC characters continuously published throughout the 1950s, there is not a clear dividing line between the Earth-One and Earth-Two versions of Superman. Several stories published before the mid-1950s took place on Earth-One. Also, any Superman stories published before the mid-1950s that featured or mentioned Superboy took place exclusively on Earth-One, as the Earth-Two Superman, per the earliest Superman comics, never had a Superboy career. His first appearance in comics was in More Fun Comics #101 (January 1945). This version of Superman remained in publication until 1986; after the miniseries Crisis on Infinite Earths (1985–86), he was written out of continuity with John Byrne's miniseries, The Man of Steel. | Superman |
| Bruce Wayne | Batman was not significantly changed by the late 1950s for the new continuity, and did not receive any major updates to his character until Detective Comics #327 (May 1964), in which Batman reverts to his detective roots, with most science-fiction elements jettisoned from the series. Details of Batman's history were altered or expanded upon through the decades. Additions include his upbringing by his uncle Philip Wayne after his parents' death. In 1969, Bruce moves from his mansion, Wayne Manor, into a penthouse apartment atop the Wayne Foundation building in downtown Gotham City, to be closer to Gotham's crime. Batman spends the 1970s and early 1980s mainly working solo, with occasional team-ups with Robin or Batgirl. Batman's adventures also become somewhat darker and more grim during this period, depicting increasingly violent crime. This version of Batman remained in publication until 1986, being written out of continuity after the miniseries Crisis on Infinite Earths (1985–86). | Batman |
| Alexis "Lex" Luthor | Luthor grew up in the suburbs of Smallville with his parents and sister. As a teenager, he learned about the existence of Smallville's own hero, Superboy. After a fire in his lab, which resulted in the loss of both his hair and all of his experiments, he was saved by Superboy but accused the hero of destroying his experiments on purpose. From that moment onward, Luthor became the sworn enemy of Superboy. Fearing that their son would never reform his ways, Luthor's parents decided to move away from Smallville and changed their name to "Thorul" in hopes of raising their daughter in a relatively peaceful life away from Luthor. During one of his outer space explorations, Luthor discovered and moved to a planet dubbed Lexor before it was destroyed in a battle with Superman. | Lex Luthor |
| Dru-Zod | Zod is a megalomaniacal Kryptonian in charge of the military forces on Krypton. He knew Jor-El at the time when he was still an aspiring scientist. After the space program was abolished following the destruction of the inhabited moon Wegthor, Zod attempted to take over Krypton. He failed and was sentenced to exile in the Phantom Zone for 40 years for his crimes. Zod was eventually released by Superboy when his term of imprisonment was up. However, he attempted to conquer Earth with his superpowers acquired under the yellow sun. With his threat now obvious, Superboy was forced to oppose Zod and ultimately banished him back to the Phantom Zone. | General Zod |

== In other media ==
- Batman's Earth-One costume is available for download in Batman: Arkham City (2011).
- In the CW series The Flash (2014–23), the Flash team encounters counterparts of friends and colleagues from another inter-dimensional Earth, which they dub "Earth-2" while referring to their own as "Earth-1". Harrison Wells of Earth-2 takes some umbrage at this; although he generally accepts the terminology, he occasionally reminds Cisco Ramon and Barry Allen that his Earth can, from his perspective, be called Earth-1.
- A variation of Earth-1 appears in Justice Society: World War II (2021). This universe is also the setting of Superman: Man of Tomorrow (2020) and Batman: The Long Halloween (2021).

== See also ==
- List of DC Multiverse worlds
