= Earth One (DC graphic novel series) =

DC Comics graphic novel imprint

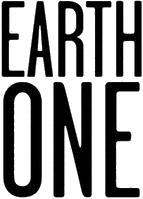
- Official logo
- Parent company: DC Comics
- Status: Active
- Predecessor: All Star DC Comics
- Founded: 2009
- Defunct: 2021
- Country of origin: United States
- Headquarters location: New York City
- Publication types: Graphic novels
- Fiction genres: Action; Adventure; Crime; Fantasy; Supernatural; Science fiction; Superhero

Earth One (EO) was an imprint of graphic novels published by DC Comics, featuring re-imagined and modernized versions of the company's superhero characters from the DC Universe. Those characters include Superman, Batman, Wonder Woman, Green Lantern, and the Teen Titans, as well as others whose characteristics and origin stories are revised and altered to suit the 21st century audience. The shared universe, unlike the original DC Universe in comic books, has yet to cross over its common plot elements, settings, and characters. The reality of Earth One is designated as Earth-1 as part of the DC Multiverse.

The imprint was launched in 2010 with the publication of Superman: Earth One, followed by Batman: Earth One in 2012. The Earth One universe would expand as more graphic novels are released, including Teen Titans: Earth One in 2014, Wonder Woman: Earth One in 2016 and Green Lantern: Earth One in 2018, with other novels currently under development. The imprint was cancelled quietly in 2021.

== Publication history ==
=== Releases ===
In 2009, DC Comics announced the Earth One line of graphic novels, which were planned to be printed in 2010 with the first issues of Superman: Earth One and Batman: Earth One. Superman: Earth One was issued in October 2010, while Batman: Earth One was held to be released at the same time as The Dark Knight Rises film in July 2012. Volume Two of Superman: Earth One was confirmed at that time to be released later that year, in October, with additional volumes of Batman: Earth One confirmed as well. Wonder Woman: Earth One Volume One was in development in 2013. Teen Titans: Earth One debuted in November 2014. In 2015, Volume Three of Superman: Earth One was released in February, three months prior the May publication for Volume Two of Batman: Earth One (which was announced for release in 2013 before being postponed). In the same year, two Earth One graphic novels were announced to have yet to come out; those were Aquaman: Earth One by writer/artist Francis Manapul and The Flash: Earth One by writer J. Michael Straczynski, who also wrote the Superman: Earth One series. In 2016, Volume One of Wonder Woman: Earth One and Volume Two of Teen Titans: Earth One were released in April and August, respectively.

The line was revived in July 2017 in which the Green Lantern (Hal Jordan) would receive his first Earth One graphic novel, which was released in March 2018, seven months before the launch for Volume Two of Wonder Woman: Earth One in October. After 2012's Volume One and 2015's Volume Two of Batman: Earth One, Volume Three was originally announced to debut in 2018, but was pushed back for 2021 due to writer Geoff Johns and artist Gary Frank's work on DC Rebirth and Doomsday Clock. Volume Two of Green Lantern: Earth One was scheduled to be published in late July 2020, but was delayed for a release in August. A month later, during DC FanDome, Jim Lee, DC's current publisher and CCO, revealed in a pre-recorded video for the event that more graphic novels from the Earth One line are in development. In the following months, Volume Three of both Wonder Woman: Earth One and Batman: Earth One were published in March and June 2021, respectively.

In January 2021, DC officially cancelled Aquaman: Earth One, as its writer/artist Manapul was reportedly leaving the company, therefore abandoning the project.

=== Crossover ===
In January 2015, The Multiversity Guidebook No. 1 was launched, a guidebook to the DC Multiverse with detailed entries of all 52 existing worlds that make it up; one of the universes present is Earth One (Earth-1), as the guide features this world's versions of the DC heroes along with a brief description of their universe. The issue is considered by many fans as the first crossover of the Earth One imprint and its characters, and until then, due to the lack of interaction, it was debated whether the novels even existed in the same continuity or not. Despite the aforementioned lack of interaction between the graphic novels, the characters from the Earth One universe still appear in some of the company's comic books. For example, Earth One's Batman makes a cameo appearance in the 10th issue of Batman: Arkham Unhinged.

In an interview with IGN from June 2015, Dan DiDio, DC's co-publisher at the time, was questioned about a crossover between the graphic novels, but he discarded the idea. In April 2021, Grant Morrison, the writer of both Wonder Woman: Earth One and The Multiversity, expressed their opinion on how an Earth One crossover will happen "eventually".

== List of graphic novels ==
Earth One volumes
Title	Volume	Publication date	Writer	Artist
Superman: Earth One	One	October 27, 2010	J. Michael Straczynski	Shane Davis
Superman: Earth One	Two	October 31, 2012	J. Michael Straczynski	Shane Davis
Superman: Earth One	Three	February 4, 2015	J. Michael Straczynski	Ardian Syaf
Batman: Earth One	One	July 4, 2012	Geoff Johns	Gary Frank
Batman: Earth One	Two	May 6, 2015	Geoff Johns	Gary Frank
Batman: Earth One	Three	June 8, 2021	Geoff Johns	Gary Frank
Teen Titans: Earth One	One	November 19, 2014	Jeff Lemire	Terry Dodson
Teen Titans: Earth One	Two	August 10, 2016	Jeff Lemire	Andrew T. MacDonald
Wonder Woman: Earth One	One	April 6, 2016	Grant Morrison	Yanick Paquette
Wonder Woman: Earth One	Two	October 3, 2018	Grant Morrison	Yanick Paquette
Wonder Woman: Earth One	Three	March 9, 2021	Grant Morrison	Yanick Paquette
Green Lantern: Earth One	One	March 20, 2018	Gabriel Hardman; Corinna Bechko	Gabriel Hardman
Green Lantern: Earth One	Two	August 11, 2020	Gabriel Hardman; Corinna Bechko	Gabriel Hardman
Aquaman: Earth One	One	Cancelled	Francis Manapul	
The Flash: Earth One	One	Cancelled	J. Michael Straczynski	

== Overview ==
=== Premise ===
This freshly created Universe is still cooling and as yet unformed. Earth-1's known superbeings – Superman, Batman, Wonder Woman and the Teen Titans – are at the beginning of their careers. Time and space are still pliable, and nothing here is certain.

— The Multiversity Guidebook No. 1

The premise of the Earth One imprint is to reimagine the characters of DC Comics by featuring "their first years and earliest moments retold in a standalone, original graphic novel format, on a new Earth with an all-new continuity". The intent is to reboot DC's most iconic superheroes and supervillains by presenting new, updated versions with revised origin stories in a modern setting to an audience that hasn't read these characters' comics previously, or hasn't seen them lately. Unlike most of the company's publications, which are comic books released monthly, the output of Earth One consists entirely of graphic novels that are launched at once. The project has been compared to the Ultimate line of Marvel Comics, which was a successful attempt to reintroduce Marvel's most popular characters to a new generation of readers. Another comparison to Earth One was with the All Star line, an earlier attempt by DC to revamp its characters in a separate continuity, although it failed in its goal mainly due to scheduling problems.

=== Characters ===
As the series takes place in a new continuity unrelated to any other in DC, the characters presented in the novels remain relatively faithful to their original counterparts from the main DC Universe, although they still differ from each other in a number of notable aspects and characteristics. For example: Batman, who is usually depicted as a near-perfect crime-fighter, is portrayed in the novels as inexperienced and constantly prone to mistakes; the Teen Titans, instead of sidekick superheroes, are presented as a group of teenagers who developed powers after being subjected to experiments by S.T.A.R. Labs; Lex Luthor is reimagined as a married couple rather than just one man; Harvey Dent, who in the mainstream comics is the supervillain Two-Face, dies and his twin sister Jessica Dent (an exclusive Batman: Earth One character) becomes the Earth One version of the villain; Steve Trevor, originally a Caucasian character in the comics, is written as an African American in the novels; and General Zod is the uncle of Superman, unlike his comic book counterpart who is unrelated to the hero. In addition to reinterpreting already established comic book characters, the Earth One series also introduces new characters unique to the graphic novels, such as the serial killer Birthday Boy and the aforementioned Jessica Dent, with both characters debuting in Volume One of Batman: Earth One.

=== Creative teams ===
"What I'm trying to do is to dig in to the character and look at him through modern eyes. If you were to create the Superman story today, for the first time, but keep intact all that works, what would it look like?"

— Artist Shane Davis in December 2009

Following the announcement of the Earth One imprint, Geoff Johns was attached to write the first Batman graphic novel, with Gary Frank as its artist. Gabriel Hardman, co-writer (alongside Corinna Bechko) and artist of the Green Lantern: Earth One series, explained in an interview to Inverse how he intended to differentiate the novel from other interpretations of the title character: "It was incredibly obvious it was going to be difficult to tell the story they were trying to tell and make that work. At that point, I ended up thinking about what would make a good Green Lantern story. What would be a good way to approach Green Lantern from the ground up? It's not difficult. You just have to strip away the things that work for a character [that's been] around for fifty years but aren't necessary to telling [a story]. You can take away some of the trappings that aren't absolutely necessary to tell a core Green Lantern story".

=== Schedule ===
A constant criticism from fans regarding the graphic novels has been about their irregular releases. Jim Lee explained the reason behind this: "We are still publishing the Earth One series, they're just not on a super regular schedule, because we reached out to top creators and gave them the time to tell their stories. Whenever they finish their projects, we take them, package them, and publish them". On the subject, DiDio stated: "We're trying to be much more selective when we do original graphic novels. If you look back to when I first got here, and we were producing a lot of prestige format books – we were churning out a lot of them, and they were a higher price point, and they were supposed to have a higher level of quality than what was going on in the regular line. But when you produce too much of that, it all starts to water itself down. Here we want to be very selective, and try to find the right teams for the right characters. That's why we're not rushing these books out – we're actually taking our time, and putting them out when they're ready, because we feel that there's going to be a hunger and interest to the audience for these creators and these characters, so when it does arrive, we're presenting it in the best form possible to reach the widest audience".

== Reception ==
Reviewing Superman: Earth One, Ain't It Cool News complimented the Earth One series for its realism, calling it the future of the comics and the Superman, and also expressed an interest to see more graphic novels published in Earth One line. In July 2012, Andrew Asberry called the Earth One line "edgy" and "exciting", noting how the "drastic" alterations made from the classic continuity of comics to the new continuity of graphic novels could be more attractive to readers. Also, Asberry compared Earth One to Marvel's Ultimate Universe, as, according to him, whereas the Ultimate Universe was more focused on making stories less convoluted so they could be accessible to new readers, Earth One is making them accessible to new readers while reimagining them entirely.

Writing for IGN, Jesse Schedeen compared Teen Titans: Earth One to the graphic novels of Superman and Batman that came before, as they all offer a streamlined, contemporary take on the characters in a new world free from any previous continuity, while also commenting on how Teen Titans doesn't even seem to be connected to the other Earth One graphic novels. Schedeen later criticized the pace of the Earth One series, saying it's "slowly growing", in addition to pointing out that one of the problems that the Earth One books face is the space limitations imposed by the graphic novel format, where the stories, according to him, "devolve into rudimentary two-act tales where the main players are introduced and then the climax immediately unfolds". Despite some criticism, he later gave positive review to some of the titles, like Green Lantern and Wonder Woman, feeling that the creators offered a new approach and reinvention to the characters in Earth One series.

Matt Santori of Comicosity praised the Earth One line for "establishing the youth and inexperience" of DC characters.

Reviewing Volume Two of Green Lantern: Earth One, GamesRadar+'s Pierce Lydon wrote that the Earth One line became a success for DC as it offered writers to take an established characters to a new direction. Ray Goldfield of GeekDad said the Volume Three of Wonder Woman: Earth One is "by far the most unique and bizarre of the Earth One books".

== In other media ==
=== Television ===
- In the television series Gotham, the character Alfred Pennyworth (Sean Pertwee) takes inspiration from both his mainstream and his Earth One counterparts, drawing elements from the two versions, such as him being a former member of the Royal Marines who is the loyal butler of the Wayne family, and later becomes the legal guardian of Bruce Wayne (David Mazouz) following the murder of his parents. Alfred is also a skilled martial artist, just like his Earth One incarnation, as he trains Bruce in the combat skills he would eventually use in his adulthood as Batman.
- In Krypton, General Zod (Colin Salmon) is depicted in the series as the uncle of Superman, similar to his version of Earth One.
- In Lanterns, the design of the Green Lantern uniforms and series tone are mainly inspired on those of Green Lantern: Earth One.

=== Films ===
- The 2013 film Man of Steel features similarities, in addition to adapting various aspects of the Superman: Earth One graphic novel. Such aspects include: a Clark Kent who is much more hesitant about revealing himself until the threat of an alien invasion forces him to do so and the story ending with him joining the Daily Planet.
- In the 2016 film Batman v Superman: Dawn of Justice, Alfred Pennyworth (Jeremy Irons) is based on the Earth One iteration of the character.
- The 2022 film The Batman features some similarities with the Batman: Earth One graphic novel, though director Matt Reeves has not officially cited it as an inspiration. Some of those similarities are: the portrayal of a still young and inexperienced Batman (Robert Pattinson) at the beginning of his career as a crime-fighter, the Riddler (Paul Dano) being a serial killer targeting Gotham City's corrupt elite, and the depiction of Alfred (Andy Serkis) as a former Royal Marine responsible for training Bruce in combat.
- The 2025 film Superman appears to take some inspiration from the graphic novels, particularly the aspect where Superman puts an end to a conflict in a third-world country.

=== Video games ===
The 2011 video game Batman: Arkham City, its 2013 prequel Batman: Arkham Origins and its 2015 sequel Batman: Arkham Knight feature a number of alternative outfits for Batman to wear, including one based on the costume used by the Earth One version of the character.

=== Web series ===
Grayson: Earth One is a fan-made web series, directed and written by Hisonni Johnson, and is available on the YouTube channel P3Series. It follows a hypothetical, alternate universe scenario similar to the premise of the Earth One imprint, in which Richard Grayson / Nightwing was never adopted by Bruce Wayne / Batman after the murder of his parents and, as a result, he did not become his sidekick Robin. The series stars Stephen McCain as Grayson, Kevin Porter as Batman, Jono Cota as Jason Todd, Angela Gulner as Barbara Gordon, Rileah Vanderbilt as Helena Bertinelli, Katie Young as Carrie Kelly, Daz Crawford as Victor Friese, and Christian Lawrence Wade as Crispus Allen. Originally planned for a six-episode season, production on the series had to be halted due to budget problems, which resulted in the release of only the first two episodes: the first, "Anything for Babs", on June 1, 2013, and the second, "The Boy and the Bullet", on March 4, 2015.

== See also ==
- All Star DC Comics, another DC Comics imprint similar to Earth One.
- The New 52, a reboot and revamp of DC's superhero books for easier access for new comic readers.
- Absolute Universe, another imprint featuring reimagined and modernized versions of DC's characters.
- Heroes Reborn, an attempt by Marvel Comics to reimagine their characters in a separate continuity from 1996 to 1997, albeit less successful.
- Ultimate Marvel, a Marvel imprint that also did a modern reimagining of its characters.
