= Teen Titans: Earth One =

Series of graphic novels

- Cover for Teen Titans: Earth One, art by Terry Dodson.

Publication information
- Publisher: Earth One (DC Comics)
- Genre: Science fiction Superhero
- Publication date: (Volume One); November 19, 2014 (Volume Two); August 10, 2016
- Main character(s): Teen Titans; Deathstroke; Niles Caulder

Creative team
- Writer(s): Jeff Lemire
- Penciller(s): Terry Dodson
- Inker(s): Rachel Dodson; Cam Smith

Teen Titans: Earth One is a series of graphic novels written by Jeff Lemire, penciled by Terry Dodson and inked by Rachel Dodson and Cam Smith. The novel is a modernized re-imagining of DC Comics' long-running Teen Titans comic book series as part of the company's Earth One imprint. Earth One's Teen Titans exists alongside other revamped DC characters in Earth One titles, including Superman: Earth One and Batman: Earth One, as well as other graphic novels.

Volume One was released on November 19, 2014, while Volume Two was released on August 10, 2016.

== Plot summary ==
=== Volume One ===
Sixteen years before the start of the series, a spaceship crashes on Earth. A group of humans investigates the accident and finds an alien couple with an infant. With the father already dead and the mother on the verge of dying, the group takes the baby away.

In New Mexico, a young girl named Raven wakes up from visions of the spaceship crashing. She does not believe her dreams mean anything, but her grandfather disagrees, telling her that it is time for her to go out to the world. In Monument, Oregon, four children start their first day of high school. Tara Markov, a troubled child with an alcoholic mother, Garfield "Gar" Logan, a boy worried about skipping two grades, Victor "Vic" Stone, a boy whose mother, Elinore Stone, has high expectations for him, and Joseph "Joey" Wilson, a gifted boy who finds high school boring.

Throughout the rest of the day, the children find out that they have superpowers. Vic discovers a liquid metal trying to cover his body, Tara has geokinesis, and Gar's skin turns green and becomes catlike in appearance after coming in contact with his pet cat. The moment their new capabilities fully flourish, they all say "Am Starfire. Need help" at the same time. Back in New Mexico, Raven's grandfather takes her to a secret location. Along the way, she tells him that she has been dreaming with the four children. A female being also appears in her dreams. They arrive at a cave where Raven's grandfather has been recording his own visions, which tell him that Raven will be the one who saves the teens.

The children's parents come together in secret, seeming to know something that the kids do not. Elinore tells them to contain the situation, but everybody is having doubts. Steven, Gar's father, even threatens to call the police, prompting Elinore to kill him. Slade, Joey's father, tries to back out, but she threatens to tell Joey of his shady past if he does not cooperate. She knows someone has been triggering the children's abilities and plans on stopping it.

At the beach, the children reveal that they've been seeing visions and have been searching for familiar spots. They come to accept that their parents are involved somehow. Joey tells the rest that he has not received any powers. Slade appears in uniform as Deathstroke engaging the children in a fight. During the struggle, he tells them the people they call their parents are not really related to them. Somewhere else, the other parents are revealed to be part of S.T.A.R. Labs. They keep the alien baby, now all grown up, captive. They try to keep her heavily sedated, but she manages to contact Raven, prompting her to transport her astral self to the fight. The alien strikes Deathstroke in the right eye and ends the battle before returning home. Elinore's higher-ups threaten to kill the alien if she cannot control her in an hour. Even though she tells them that "Starfire" is too important to terminate, she is told that the "Blackfire" project is still ongoing.

The children locate the S.T.A.R. Labs facility underneath a nearby lighthouse and begin to hear Starfire's voice. Within a room with the name "Titans Project" on its door, they find incubators specifically made for them and a sea creature-like boy surrounded by turtles in a tank. They also encounter Elinore surrounded by men dressed like Deathstroke. Elinore tries to reason with the children with the men subduing anyone who tries to use their abilities. She tells them that their abilities came from elements from Starfire and the ship that brought her to Earth. After Gar finds out his father is dead, he lashes out at Elinore and a fight ensues. Joey, calling himself Jericho, sides with Elinore and uses his body-jumping capabilities. Deathstroke tries to intervene and accidentally slits Jericho's throat. As a means of saving his life, Jericho possesses his father's body.

The children find Starfire and release her from her cell. Enraged, Starfire kills Elinore and leaves, telling them that they are not who she is looking for. Distraught, Vic, Gar, and Tara worry about their futures. Rita suggests they head to Utah, where another facility and the head of the entire project, a man named Caulder is located. She also suggests that they should bring the sea-creature boy, named Tempest. The children leave S.T.A.R. Labs and disappear. Four days after the incident, Raven appears worried about not having dreams of the group. She enters a cave and finds Starfire asking for help.

=== Volume Two ===
Tara, Vic, Gar and Tempest hide out in an abandoned house in Seattle, eluding the police and stealing food and medicine to survive while Vic's metallic condition worsens. Slade Wilson, still possessed by Jericho, breaks into a high tech complex, disables a number of guards, and confronts Niles Caulder, the head of the project that empowered the children. He offers to lead Caulder to Starfire.

Starfire takes refuge with Raven at her New Mexico home. She links minds with Raven and tells her how she came to Earth. After an attack on their world, Starfire's parents got into a space ship and flew to Earth with their infant daughter. She came to New Mexico knowing Raven can hide her from the aliens searching her. Caulder instructs his chief scientist Joshua Clay to send a Doom Patrol unit with Jericho to New Mexico and retrieve Starfire. He also orders to send The Titans to Seattle to retrieve Tara, Vic, Gar and Tempest. The Titans are Wonder Girl (a young black female with superhuman strength), Kole (who creates crystal) and Impulse (a speedster). The well-trained Titans fly to the teenagers' hideout and easily defeat them.

Raven senses the trouble in Seattle, but before she and Starfire can consider going there to help, the Doom Patrol unit appears. They hurt Raven's grandfather while entering the house, prompting Starfire to attack them with her energy blasts. Jericho tries to possess Raven, but she traps him in her own mind. She then stops Starfire from killing Slade, revealing the alien's real name, Koriand'r, in the process. He reveals Caulder's plan for taking over the US government. They involved using Starfire's DNA to create both the four children, who were given normal lives, and the Titans, who were trained and brainwashed from birth to obey Caulder and believe he is their father. Caulder blackmailed all the people involved in the project to serve him and never leave the organization.

The captured four are brought in as planned. Slade, pretending to be Joseph, reports in and says he and the Doom Patrol captured Starfire, killed Raven and are sterilizing the area before bringing Starfire in. Caulder greets them all wearing "the Robotman", an exoskeleton that allows him to walk. He sends the Titans off for debriefing and tells the four captured teens that they will become his Titans as well. He locks them up and prepares for the arrival of Slade and Starfire. Once in Caulder's presence, they drop the ruse and start attacking the security. Raven prevents Starfire from killing Caulder and takes her to the captive children. A fight with the Titans starts, but Raven is able to show Impulse the truth. Kole chooses to unlock the power damping collars on Gar, Tara, and Tempest on her own free will. Raven mentally stops Wonder Girl from fighting and they all turn against Caulder. Impulse races through the complex and brings the others to see the horror he found: their dead cloned forebears.

They confront Caulder and demand answers. Caulder responds by releasing Subject 8: Starfire's clone Blackfire. As they fight, Tara finds and frees Vic, who had fallen into a coma. As the battle with Blackfire rages, Jericho emerges from Raven and takes over Blackfire's body. He continues the attack until Vic and Tara enter the fray. Now free of the metal, Vic uses a powered robot body that does his bidding while letting him retain his humanity. They fight Jericho off as a group, only for him to take Caulder and flee for parts unknown. Raven teleports the others away before the police arrive. Slade finds a despondent Joshua Clay sitting beside an empty chair.

The group flees to New Mexico, where they make a home for themselves. Raven shows them her dream cave, where she drew images of each of them based on her visions. Gar and Kole seem to have formed a relationship. Vic reveals that he and the robot body he calls Rover cannot be separated without rendering him comatose again. Tara tells him that she will not leave him alone. Wonder Girl and Tempest develop a friendship as well. Impulse loves having the freedom to run that New Mexico affords.

Raven and Starfire look online and discover that Caulder is still missing, but his S.T.A.R. Labs operation has been shut down. Clay is taken away by the authorities. Raven confesses to Starfire that during the fight, she may have dropped the mental shield around Starfire and that those searching for her might find her in the future. Starfire says that if they come, they will fight them together. Raven's grandfather has a bonfire for all of them. The group is happy to be together but nervous about what will happen next. Raven tells them that for the past two years, she has had continuous nightmares, but since they arrived in New Mexico, all her dreams have been good. Her final words are: "And all of you were in them".

== Reception ==
IGN's Jesse Schedeen gave Teen Titans: Earth One a positive review, stating that "the book offers a clever, cohesive overhaul of the franchise and is the first Titans comic in a while to try new and interesting things". He also compared Teen Titans: Earth One to the graphic novels of Superman and Batman that came before, as they all offer a streamlined, contemporary take on the characters in a new world free from any previous continuity, while also commenting on how Teen Titans does not seem to be connected to the other Earth One graphic novels. Teen Titans: Earth One has made it to No. 5 on The New York Times' Hardcover Graphic Books Best Seller List.

== See also ==
- List of Teen Titans comics
