= All Star DC Comics =

Imprint of DC Comics

DC Comics All-Star imprint

All Star was an imprint of ongoing American comic book titles published by DC Comics that ran from 2005 to 2008. DC Comics has published two titles under the All Star banner, featuring Superman and Batman, and announced a number of titles featuring other heroes under the imprint that were never released.

== Overview ==
The premise of the imprint was to partner DC Comics' top tier characters with the most popular and acclaimed writers and artists. The creators had access to all elements in the characters' histories to present their interpretation for a modern audience that have not read these DC characters' comics previously, or had not seen them lately. The creative teams were not beholden to any previous and present continuities, and told stories that featured "the most iconic versions of these characters".

The project had been compared to the Ultimate line of Marvel Comics, which was a successful attempt to re-introduce Marvel's most popular characters to a new generation of readers by presenting new, updated versions unburdened by decades of plotlines. There were several differences between the two imprints, though. While the Ultimate titles have closely interrelated storylines, of the two All-Star series released, there has been no effort to make them conform to each other or indicate they exist in the same continuity. Another is that All-Star did not seek to introduce brand new versions of the characters so much as to present them in unhindered continuity. Robin's origin was the only one "rebooted" in this imprint.

Some observers, and DC themselves, had pointed to the return of DC's major film franchises as an impetus for All-Star. The website Comicon.com wrote that "no one can doubt that some kind of continuity shedding is necessary with Superman and Batman coming to the big screens. Moviegoers entertained by these films would find the current comics storylines impenetrable".

With the end of Grant Morrison and Frank Quitely's All-Star Superman and the rebranding of Frank Miller and Jim Lee's All Star Batman and Robin as Dark Knight: Boy Wonder as well as the introduction of the DC: Earth One line of OGNs, the imprint is effectively defunct.

== All Star titles ==
Only three All-Star titles have been released, although the last title is technically not a part of All Star imprint since it went defunct in 2008. The original intent was for the creators to present versions of the DC characters the public could identify with but has since evolved with the creators' sensibilities and story direction. In that regard, DC Comics has decided that each of the series would end when the creators decide they are done rather than continue with a new creative team. The All-Star titles are self-contained, despite sharing a label. Each story within each book has the option of also having its own continuity, without ties to previous stories:

- All Star Batman & Robin, the Boy Wonder is the first title to come out of the All-Star imprint. It premiered in September 2005. The first story arc featured artist Jim Lee and writer Frank Miller. This series features stories set in the early stages of the career of Batman, beginning with his recruitment of Dick Grayson as his sidekick Robin. Vicki Vale, Black Canary, Superman, Wonder Woman, Green Lantern, Plastic Man, and Batgirl also appear. After the series being on hiatus for nearly two years, DC Comics in 2010 that Miller and Lee would return to the series in February 2011. Instead of falling under the "All-Star" print, the series was to be re-branded as "Dark Knight: Boy Wonder" and to run for six issues, completing the story Miller originally intended to tell. All-Star Batman & Robin the Boy Wonder is in a spin-off continuity set in Frank Miller's "Dark Knight Universe" which consists of Batman: Year One, Spawn/Batman, The Dark Knight Returns, The Dark Knight Strikes Again, and The Dark Knight III: The Master Race. Dark Knight: Boy Wonder has not been solicited and the project is presumably cancelled.
- All-Star Superman premiered in November 2005. The creative team of writer Grant Morrison and artist Frank Quitely finished their twelve-issue run in 2008. There were discussions with Morrison on a spin-off limited series or special possibly featuring the Super-Sons and Men of Tomorrow, but these plans were likely canceled.
- All-Star Batman was an ongoing series that premiered in August 2016 as part of the DC Rebirth relaunch, and ran for 14 issues until October 2017. The creative team consisted of writer Scott Snyder and multiple artists, mainly John Romita Jr. Despite the title, the series is set in the mainstream DC Universe continuity.

=== Unreleased titles ===
There were several other titles announced that would have added to the All-Star lineup but never saw publication:

- All Star Wonder Woman was confirmed at San Diego Comic-Con 2006, with Adam Hughes announced as writer and artist. Hughes intended to retell the character's origin story, and described his approach to the series as an "iconic interpretation" of the character, but explained at the 2010 San Diego Comic-Con that the project was "in the freezer" for the time being, due to the difficulty involved in doing both writing and illustrating by himself.
- All Star Batgirl was announced at the Toronto Comic Book Expo in 2006. Geoff Johns and J. G. Jones were planning to work on the first six issues, which would present a connection between Barbara Gordon and Arkham Asylum. According to Johns, the series was to feature "a mystery centering around Barbara Gordon's transformation into Batgirl" as in Batman: The Long Halloween. The title was described as not taking place in the continuity of All Star Batman and Robin the Boy Wonder.
- All Star Green Lantern was planned, with the creative team of Brian Azzarello and Cliff Chiang, and would have starred the John Stewart version of the character.

== In other media ==
=== Television ===
- The first season of The Flash has an episode called "All-Star Team Up".
- The 2017 Arrowverse crossover "Crisis on Earth-X" loosely incorporates several elements from All-Star Superman: the Nazi Supergirl is shown to be suffering from the same condition Superman is in the comic, and her cells are mentioned to be overloaded with solar radiation. When asked about this, she says "like Icarus, I flew too close to the sun", further referencing the events of the comic.
- The third season of My Adventures with Superman incorporates several elements from All-Star Superman; the Fortress of Solitude now has several caped-robot servants, and the Subterranosauri led by Tyrannko, initially an enemy-later-ally of the Super-family.

=== Film ===
- All-Star Superman, a film in the DC Universe Animated Original Movies series, is an adaptation of Grant Morrison and Frank Quitely's comic book All-Star Superman. It was written by writer Dwayne McDuffie and directed by Sam Liu. It was released on February 22, 2011. It stars James Denton as Superman, Christina Hendricks as Lois Lane, Anthony LaPaglia as Lex Luthor, Edward Asner as Perry White, Obba Babatundé as Judge, Steven Blum as Atlas, Linda Cardellini as Nasthalthia Luthor, Frances Conroy as Martha Kent, Alexis Denisof as Dr. Leo Quintum, Michael Gough as Parasite, Matthew Gray Gubler as Jimmy Olsen, Finola Hughes as Lilo, Kevin Michael Richardson as Steve Lombard, and Arnold Vosloo as Bar-El.
- The 2013 film Man of Steel features a monologue spoken by Jor-El (Russell Crowe) taken almost word-for-word from the comic.
- The 2025 film Superman takes inspiration from All-Star Superman.

=== Miscellaneous ===
A full-cast audio dramatisation from DC and Penguin House Audio of All-Star Superman was released in June 2025. The cast includes Marc Thompson as Superman, Kristen Sieh as Lois Lane, and Christopher Smith as Lex Luthor.

== See also ==
- Ultimate Marvel - a Marvel Comics imprint preceding All-Star with a similar purpose.
- Earth One - another DC-Imprint that reimagines its most popular heroes.
- The New 52 - DC's reboot and revamp of the company's superhero books for easier access for new comic readers.
