= Superman (Earth-One) =

- The Silver Age iteration of Superman, based on as he appeared during the 1960s, on a variant cover of Action Comics 1000; art by Michael Allred.

Publication information
- Publisher: DC Comics
- First appearance: More Fun Comics #101 (January 1945)
- Created by: Jerry Siegel; Joe Shuster

In-story information
- Alter ego: Kal-El/Clark Kent
- Place of origin: Krypton
- Team affiliations: The Daily Planet; WGBS-TV; Justice League; Legion of Super-Heroes; Team Superman
- Notable aliases: Nightwing; Superboy
- Abilities: See list: Superhuman strength, stamina, endurance, speed, agility, reflexes, intelligence, longevity, and hearing; Solar radiation absorption; Enhanced vision; Microscopic vision; X-ray vision; Telescopic vision; Invulnerability; Ice and wind breath; Flight; Heat vision; Hyperspace travel; Mesmerism; Voice projection; Combat expertise

The Superman of Earth-One is a superhero and the incarnation of Superman that existed during the Silver Age and Bronze Age publications of DC Comics. He is also known by the following names: Silver Age Superman, Bronze Age Superman, and Pre-Crisis Superman.

== History ==
In the mid-1950s, following the decline of superhero comics after World War II and the end of the Golden Age of comics, the editors at DC decided to revive some of their Golden Age superheroes with completely new origins and backstories. Starting with the Flash in Showcase #4 in 1956, new versions of DC's former heroes were gradually introduced as completely separate characters with no connection to previous incarnations. This concept eventually became canonized with the introduction of DC's multiverse in 1960s DC Comics.

With the introduction of DC's multiverse, it was retroactively declared that the version of Superman published between 1938 and the early 1950s lived in an alternate dimension called Earth-Two, while comics featuring Superman published since approximately the mid-1950s took place in a universe dubbed Earth-One. This was confirmed by the introduction of the Earth-Two Superman as a distinct character in Justice League of America #73 (August 1969). However, since Superman was one of several DC characters continuously published throughout the 1950s, there is no clear dividing line between the Earth-One and Earth-Two versions of Superman, thus leading to a gray area between the Golden and Silver Ages. This was in part due to how Superman by that time had several comic books with different editors, thus allowing for inconsistencies between titles.

This began to change in the late 1950s, when Mort Weisinger was made group editor of all Superman titles and made an attempt to create a cohesive universe around Superman, the "first serious attempt at a constantly developing continuity in comics history". This was in part due to the advent of annuals which often reprinted earlier Superman stories, allowing readers access to older stories and thus obliging Weisinger and his writers to create a consistent history for the character. This history/continuity (and with it the version of Superman that would go on to become the Earth-One Superman) effectively began in 1958 as Weisinger allowed for few stories prior to 1958 to be reprinted or referenced.

There were a few exceptions, though, as several stories published before the mid-1950s retroactively took place on Earth-One, such as Superman #78 from September–October 1952, the first appearance of the adult Lana Lang in Superman comics. Also, any Superman stories published before the mid-1950s that featured or mentioned Superboy also took place exclusively on Earth-One, as the Earth-Two Superman, per the earliest Superman comics, never had a Superboy career. The Silver Age/Earth-One Superman's first appearance in comics was, retroactively, in Superman (volume 1) #46 (May 1947), the first time Superboy was referenced in a Superman story. The Earth-One Superman's first appearance (in a flash-forward) in a Superboy story was in Superboy #1 (March–April 1949).

This version of Superman remained in publication through 1986. After the 1985–86 miniseries Crisis on Infinite Earths, the Earth-One Superman was written out of continuity with the 1986 John Byrne miniseries The Man of Steel. However, the Earth-One Superman was given a send-off in the final, noncanonical-to-Earth-One "imaginary" story Whatever Happened to the Man of Tomorrow? in Superman #423 (September 1986) and Action Comics #583 (September 1986).

== Fictional biography ==
The Earth-One Superman's origin story was retold in various times; the most prominent retellings were in Superman #146 (July 1961), Limited Collectors' Edition #C-31 (November–December 1974), and Action Comics #500 (October 1979). Comic book magazine Amazing Heroes also provided a overview of Superman in the Silver and Bronze Ages.

As recounted in these retellings, Superman was born Kal-El on the planet Krypton to the illustrious El family whose genealogy had been manipulated for centuries by the Guardians of the Universe in the hope of one day creating the perfect hero. Krypton, however, was unstable and despite the best attempts of the Green Lantern of that sector they were unable to save the planet nor were warnings of Kal-El's father, Jor-El heeded. Determined to at least save their son, he and wife, Lara Lor-Van, sent Kal in an experimental rocket to Earth moments before the planet exploded. Unlike other versions of the character, his parents did not place him in the escape rocket as an infant but as a toddler and he was thus old enough to remember his parents and seeing them die with the planet.

Landing outside of the town of Smallville, the three-year-old Kal-El was found by elderly farming couple Jonathan and Martha Kent who sought to adopt him. To avoid questions as to where they had found the baby, the couple here left him on the doorstep of an orphanage and returned the next day. They formally adopted him and named him Clark after Martha's maiden name.

This version of Superman developed his full range of superpowers within minutes of arriving on Earth thus becoming "Superbaby". The Silver Age version of the character is widely regarded as one of the most powerful. While Silver Age writers initially used "Superbaby" as a joke, later writers commented on his early development of superpowers by saying that the Kents made a point of raising their son to be a hero from the very day he arrived on Earth. However, on seeing the sheer power that his son possessed (even to the point of being able to destroy planets as a toddler) and that the boy, despite that power, had a child's level of restraint and maturity, Jonathan Kent began to fear his son and had nightmares of him taking over the world. He and his wife soon lost that fear on seeing their son cry at the death of a dog on account of his being able to see the life force of every living thing. That night, an eight year old Clark Kent donned his red and blue uniform for the very first time and swore an oath never to kill and to preserve life in all its forms, and that if he should break that oath, renounce his power forever.

Soon after Clark Kent made his first public appearance as Superboy. Whilst there had been adventurers such as the magician John Zatara, Kent was still world's first superhero and it led to an uproar and fear. After telling his origin to reporter Perry White and meeting with the President of the United States, however, Superboy was granted American citizenship.

By this time, Clark had started school and his parents had sold their farm, moving into Smallville, where they opened a general store where he had a part-time job stacking shelves for his father. During his childhood, Superboy first met Lana Lang and Pete Ross. He was also reunited with his Kryptonian dog Krypto whom Jor-El had placed in a test rocket whilst preparing the vehicle that would take his son to Earth.

Superboy also first met in Smallville the boy who would become his main archenemy, the criminal genius Lex Luthor. They were initially friends but after Superboy unintentionally destroyed one of Luthor's science experiments, the young scientist grew bitter, thus leading to a rivalry and eventually a grudge that turned into a life of crime. Other foes Superboy encountered included the Kryptonite Kid, and various foes from his membership in the 30th century's superhero team, the Legion of Super-Heroes.

Superboy made Smallville famous but always saw it as a training ground for his eventual career as Superman, something he was aware of due to having used recovered Kryptonian technology to see the future. To that end he sought out and met the boy who would one day become his best friend and fellow heroes, Bruce Wayne (Batman). He also met Arthur Curry/"Aquaboy" who at the time was Earth-One's only other superhero. He also met other teens who would later be heroes such as young Hal Jordan and Barbara Gordon.

Shortly after Clark's high school graduation, both Jonathan and Martha Kent died of natural causes, though not before Jonathan made his son swear to use his powers for good as Superman. With no surviving family and nobody aware of his secret, he was alone. He, as Superboy, then bid goodbye to Smallville and as Clark Kent left to attend Metropolis University to earn a degree in journalism. His failure to save the people he loved the most despite all his power, had a profound effect on Kent and while in college, he even considered abandoning his heroic career. After realizing the good he had done, however and the good he could continue to do, ultimately forgave himself and changed his name from "Superboy" to "Superman".

After graduating from college, Clark obtained employment as a reporter with the Daily Planet though editor-in-chief Perry White was initially reluctant to hire him and even after giving him a job was still leery of Kent. Stories detailing that also state that already established reporter Lois Lane, stood up for him, taking his side against White.

It was shortly after getting his job at the Daily Planet that Clark Kent began a relationship with Lois Lane, though unlike other versions of the characters, Lois initially hated Superman seeing him a conceited showoff. Instead, she was attracted to Clark Kent appreciating the rookie reporter's journalism skills and modesty, and they began dating. When Superman saved her, despite having lost his superpowers, her feelings reversed. Clark Kent did like Lois and hoped to start a relationship but found it awkward to compete against himself.

He also met and befriended photographer Jimmy Olsen in both his identities.

It was in this early phase of his career as Superman when he, who up til then only had American citizenship, was awarded honorary citizenship by the UN in each and everyone of its member countries in honor of all his heroic deeds on behalf of the whole world. Though the exact time was not specified, it was written as the climax of an origin story and thus presumably happens early on.

Superman's high school sweetheart, Lana Lang, who had followed him to Metropolis University reentered his life, as a TV reporter. She was a friendly rival to Lois for Superman's affections but while he loved both women, a recurring theme in Silver Age stories was his refusal to marry either one for fear that his enemies would take revenge on him by killing a non-super spouse. Another theme was the two women seeking to prove that Superman was Clark Kent and Superman "proving" that he was not.

It was at the very start of Superman's adult career, Lex Luthor, who plagued the hero as a youth in Smallville, returned and repeatedly faced him to prove his superiority over the hero by any means necessary. He was not the only foe Kal-El faced; new villains included the supervillain android Brainiac who stole and shrank various Earth cities. Superman freed those cities—and cities from other worlds such as the Kryptonian city of Kandor. He kept the bottled city in his Fortress of Solitude and sought repeatedly to restore it to its proper size.

After Superman reached adulthood, other superheroes soon debuted, including the hero who would become his best friend in the superhero community, Batman. The two heroes would engage in regular team-ups over their careers (as shown in the title World's Finest Comics). Another ally of Superman is his cousin Kara Zor-El, another survivor of Krypton's doom, who came to Earth and became Supergirl. Soon after Supergirl's arrival on Earth, Superman became a founding member of the Justice League of America, Earth-One's most prominent superhero team.

In 1971 with the advent of the Bronze Age of Comics, Clark began working as the evening news anchor for WGBS-TV after his new boss Morgan Edge purchased the Daily Planet. Along with Edge, Clark soon gained as coworkers WGBS-TV sports anchor Steve Lombard and childhood friend Lana Lang, who became Clark's co-anchor.

It was during the Bronze Age that the Earth-One Superman began to reevaluate his life and decided that he had neglected his identity as Clark Kent and that he should allow himself to be more assertive in that identity. This was because, unlike later versions of the character he regarded Superman as his real identity and that he was only "disguised as a mild mannered reporter". While he always identified primarily as Superman, he nevertheless reclaimed his identity as Clark Kent, becoming a celebrity for his role as a news anchorman. He also found fame as print reporter, with people taking his being the single most honest and reliable reporter at the Daily Planet for granted.

It was also at this time that Superman's purpose began to change. Whereas the more whimsical Silver Age uncritically showed him solving every problem he came across—no matter how small—and regularly raising billions for charity, writer Elliot S. Maggin addressed this in his "Must There be a Superman". There, the Guardians of the Universe (whose own Green Lanterns cannot directly interfere in mundane affairs) took note of all this and began to worry that he was robbing humanity of its initiative by solving every problem. They explained this to Superman who, on returning to Earth, saw that people actually were becoming dependent on him and so decided that, unless lives were at stake, he would no longer do for ordinary humans what they could do for themselves. This remained in place for the rest of the Bronze Age.

He also managed to restore the city of Kandor and placed it on people on an uninhabited world that was promptly named New Krypton.

He also began exploring the Multiverse with the Justice League. He learned of and met his Earth Two counterpart and the chief heroes of other dimensions as well such as Captain Marvel/Shazam. The most startling, however, was his finding Earth Prime, the "real" world in which he (and other DC heroes) were fictional characters. He learned of it from the Flash and found the idea that a world wherein everyone knows his secret identity strange and that could function without any superheroes even stranger. However, he overcame his initial unease and befriended the staff of DC Comics, including his most famous artist Curt Swan and editor Julius Schwartz. He was touched by the idea that the people of the real world, despite only knowing of him as a fictional character, still looked up to him as a hero.

By this time, Superman managed to convince both Lois and Lana that he was not Clark Kent, but he ultimately broke off his relationship with Lois saying that while he did love her, his responsibilities to the world and to the greater universe had to come first. For her part, Lois decided that she had wasted a good part of her career by staying in Metropolis for Superman's sake and left. As both a journalist and as a woman, she had to get on with her life.

It was also hinted in conversations with his Golden Age/Earth Two counterpart, that the real reason he had never married his own Lois Lane was fear of commitment, rather that fears for her safety or that he would be too busy to be a good husband. Regardless, glimpses of the future, showed that this version of Superman would have eventually married Lois Lane

Other glimpses of the future showed that in the centuries to come, his legend would lead to a quasi-religion revolving around his deeds and those of other heroes; worshipers would dress as famous heroes and periodically attend conventions. Its chief holiday was "Miracle Monday" wherein celebrants would set aside a plate for Superman, hoping that he would visit and attend the sacred meal. In fact, whilst Superman would ultimately die, his descendants would continue the never-ending battle for truth and justice as they shepherded humanity in its exploration of the universe, intermarrying with mortals thus raising it to the next level of evolution.

The career of the Earth-One Superman came to an abrupt end, however, with the release of Crisis on Infinite Earths, an event meant to redefine DC's characters with the main villain Anti-Monitor attempting to destroy the universe but instead altering its history completely.

In 2011, however, years after it was published, Marv Wolfman revealed that just prior to the events in Crisis, which he wrote, that Superman was approached by a woman named Harbinger who explained to him that even if the Anti-Monitor was defeated, that the surviving reality would be left deformed. He was shown events of DC Comics ranging from the late 1980s to 2011 to show just how terrible the upcoming age would be. He saw his own death, his fellow heroes in an identity crisis, Wonder Woman summarily executing people on live TV, the Amazons attack, Batman betraying the Justice League, etc. She asked him if that was the fate that awaited it, was the DC Universe even worth saving; Superman said that, no matter what happened, life was still worth living and the future still worth saving. He would carry on.

In the Crisis, Superman led the other heroes of the multiverse in the struggle against the Anti-Monitor—though he found himself targeted by the villain above other heroes. In the end, Anti-Monitor was defeated and the remaining universes saved but many heroes died in the struggle including his friend Barry Allen and his cousin Supergirl. After the struggle, he took her body to New Krypton where he, along with her parents, buried her.

This version of Superman was given a send off with Alan Moore’s "Whatever Happened to the Man of Tomorrow?" where Superman de-powers himself with Gold Kryptonite and apparently freezes to death as atonement for killing Mister Mxyzptlk. The ending strongly implies that Lois' husband, Jordan Elliott is a de-powered Superman in disguise as their infant son squeezes a lump of coal until it becomes a diamond. Outgoing editor Julius Schwartz instructed this to be written as if it were the last Superman story ever—which it in fact was for the Earth-One Superman as that version of the character was replaced by John Byrne's reboot in the next issue.

The Earth-One Superman was long thought erased but in the years since Crisis glimpses of parallel dimensions, alternate timelines, and the restored multiverse shows, that however remote, he and the Earth-One universe still exist.

=== Allies ===
As the first prominent superpowered superhero of Earth-One, Superboy met few other peers his own age outside of his trips to the 30th Century to serve as part of the Legion of Super-Heroes. Earth-One's main other superpowered superhero during Superboy's era was the teenaged Aquaman (who called himself "Aquaboy"). After Superman reached adulthood, other superheroes made their debuts, including Batman, Wonder Woman, Green Lantern, the Flash, and Martian Manhunter. The above group of heroes plus Superman decided to form the superhero team the Justice League of America.

=== Fellow Kryptonians ===
Besides Supergirl, other Kryptonians were revealed as having survived the explosion of Krypton. These included the denizens of the bottle city of Kandor, Superman's pet dog Krypto, and the prisoners in the Phantom Zone.

== Equipment ==
As an adult, Superman made prominent use of his Fortress of Solitude. An elaborate facility located in the Arctic, the Fortress traditionally could only be accessed with the use of a giant-sized key only Superman could lift.

Superman also made extensive use of Superman robots, robots that could pose as Superman (or Clark Kent) as needed, with a fraction of his abilities, but the robots became largely disused by the early 1970s.

== Post-Crisis use of Earth-One elements ==
=== Crisis on Infinite Earths ===
Along with the existence of his Earth-Two counterpart, Superman's Earth-One existence and history were erased from continuity, after the conclusion of 1985-86 miniseries Crisis on Infinite Earths, following the destruction of the Pre-Crisis universe in that storyline. The Post-Crisis Earth would be an entirely new continuity, and the Post-Crisis Superman an entirely new person, but some aspects of the Earth-One version remained intact. However, Clark's career as Superboy, Supergirl, and Superman's tenure with the Legion of Super-Heroes were removed entirely from the new timeline. Writer John Byrne acknowledged that he intended to reintroduce several modified Silver Age aspects such as Superboy to the comics, but he was fired after two years due to "creative differences" with DC.

=== Infinite Crisis ===
A year after the Infinite Crisis, a number of the Earth-One elements have been restored to the Post-Crisis Earth (dubbed "New Earth"). Although several Byrne aspects, such as his portrayal of Clark's football days and love interest in Lana, remain in continuity, the Kryptonian criminal Jax-Ur has been re-introduced into "Post-Infinite Crisis" canon in the "Superman: Last Son" story arc, and Clark is revealed to have been made an honorary member of the Legion of Super-Heroes during his late teens. According to Clark, he met Mon-El and wrongly assumed him to have been his long-lost brother from Krypton, based on their similar names, and Superman still has a Legion flight ring in his possession. He is shown to have been wearing glasses as far back as his adolescent Smallville years, and he has actively been saving lives in a low-profile.

== Other versions ==
=== Superman: Earth-One ===
Superman: Earth One is an original graphic novel written by J. Michael Straczynski and illustrated by Shane Davis. The story focuses on a young Superman's decisions to use his powers to help the world rather than for his own benefit. Due to the weekly series Trinity creating a new Earth-One, the story may be part of the DC Multiverse, as Straczynski said that it is not part of the main DCU.

=== All-Star Superman ===
Grant Morrison's critically acclaimed All-Star Superman draws inspiration from this version of Superman in order to "strip down the Man of Steel to his timeless, essential elements". Among older classic elements of the character are things such as:

- A career as "Superboy" and the death of Jonathan Kent being what motivated Clark to leave Smallville.
- Luthor being primarily a mad scientist able to escape at will from prison.
- Clark Kent being clumsy and timid.
- Robot duplicates that exist to aid Superman.

=== Superman: Birthright ===
In the miniseries Superman: Birthright, Mark Waid retold Superman's origin and restored various elements of the pre-Crisis/Silver Age version of the character, namely he and Luthor having been friends in Smallville until a ruined science experiment left Luthor embittered and angry at Superman. Waid said that he regards the Superman novels of Elliot S. Maggin—Superman's chief writer in the Bronze Age—as being his textbooks on the character. He also admitted that Birthright was inspired by Superman: The Movie, which was itself based on the pre-Crisis/Silver Age version of the character.

== In other media ==
- The 1980s TV series Superboy featured John Haymes Newton (Season 1) and Gerard Christopher (Season 2 onwards) in the role of a college-aged Clark Kent/Superboy. Like the Earth-One Superboy, he was depicted as being a peer (but not a friend) of fellow student Lex Luthor, who blamed him for the loss of his hair after he rescued him from a laboratory accident.
- Superman (1978) was based upon the Superman of this era, showing things such as Lex Luthor being a terrorist/criminal rather than an evil businessman, Superman (not Clark Kent) being the dominant personality, and Clark's failure to save his adoptive father being what led him to leave Smallville and eventually become a hero.
- Both The Superman/Aquaman Hour of Adventure (1967–1968) and Super Friends (1973–1985) featured a Superman based on this era's version of the character, retaining elements such as Superman and Lex Luthor being friends before the latter's turn to evil, and Superman's close friendship with Batman.
- Injustice (2021) features an adaptation of the Earth-One Superman, who wears the classic costume in contrast to the film's main version of the character, who wears a more modern costume. This heroic version of Superman is recruited by a multiverse-hopping Mister Terrific to combat the corrupted Superman, who ultimately defeats him due to Earth-One Superman holding back. When introduced by Mister Terrific, he claims that the alternate Superman hails from "Earth-9" and that he was brought to "Earth-1", but the latter corrects him, stating that his home reality is Earth-1 and that the Injustice universe is "Earth-22".

== See also ==
- Superman (Earth-Two)
- Ultraman (comics)
- Alternative versions of Superman
- History of Superman (Silver Age)
- History of Superman (Bronze Age)
