= Wonder Woman: Earth One =

DC Comics series of graphic novels

Publication information
- Publisher: Earth One (DC Comics)
- Genre: Superhero
- Publication date: (Volume One); April 6, 2016 (Volume Two); October 3, 2018 (Volume Three); March 9, 2021
- Main character: Wonder Woman

Creative team
- Written by: Grant Morrison
- Artist: Yanick Paquette
- Letterer: Todd Klein
- Colorist: Nathan Fairbairn

Collected editions
- Volume 1: ISBN 1401229786
- Volume 2: ISBN 1401281176
- Volume 3: ISBN 1779502079

Wonder Woman: Earth One is a series of three graphic novels published by DC Comics as part of the Earth One line written by Grant Morrison and illustrated by Yanick Paquette. Volume One of the series was released on April 6, 2016, Volume Two was released on October 3, 2018, and Volume Three was released on March 9, 2021. The stories retell the origin of Wonder Woman as a princess who leaves the paradise of Themyscira to fight injustice in man's world and spread the message of loving submission from Amazonian society. The comics were commercially successful and received positive reviews from critics.

Wonder Woman: Earth One is the fourth original graphic novel by DC Comics as part of the Earth One line of graphic novels established in 2009. It follows the releases of Superman: Earth One, Batman: Earth One and Teen Titans: Earth One.

== Plot ==
=== Volume One ===
The demigod Hercules has captured Queen Hippolyta and several other Amazons, degrading the queen in front of her subjects. Hippolyta begs for aid from Aphrodite, who reveals that Hippolyta must reclaim her girdle to protect from harm against Hercules. She does so, and seduces Hercules long enough to break his neck with her own chains. She then frees her fellow Amazons and defeat Hercules's band of soldiers. The queen once again prays to Aphrodite to retire the Amazons from the world of man.

3,000 years later, Wonder Woman returns to Paradise Island where she is placed under arrest for consorting in "man's world". The trial is witnessed by the Fates, as well as a crowd of Amazons including Nubia. Diana begins her story by recalling a moment with Althea, keeper of the Purple Ray. Diana uses the ray to heal Dindra, an injured deer. Althea asks if Diana will participate in the games to honor the goddess Diana, but she replies that her mother Hippolyta does not wish her to as she would have an unfair advantage with her powers. During the festival, Diana appears wearing the lion headdress of Hercules, then runs off while the others chase after her. Diana travels to the shore, where she finds a man who falls to the ground.

In the present time, Hippolyta calls Althea forward to testify. Althea explains that she went to identify a noise in her laboratory, but when she returned, the Purple Ray had disappeared, suggesting Diana took it. Diana reveals she took the ray to heal the man, Steve Trevor. She later challenged the champion Mala to a battle. Diana wins, and claims Mala's swan plane. Later, Hippolyta scolds Diana for her actions. She smells a familiar fragrance on Diana, then realizes it must be a man. After Diana leaves, she orders the Amazons to search out Paradise Island and find him.

Elsewhere, Diana leads Steve to the swan plane, but is ambushed by Mala and several others. Mala is then called to testify in the present time. She angrily states that Diana broke tradition. Mala chases after Diana's plane but Diana manages to escape. Mala returns to Hippolyta, who plans to recruit Medusa from the Underworld.

Diana flies Steve back to the United States and brings him to a hospital. While in the hospital, Diana finds many elderly women who are dying and begins to panic. She attempts to flee, but she's confronted by several soldiers. She fights them off, then decides to leave. In the present, Etta Candy, called Beth, is summoned to testify. She recalls her first meeting with Diana: the bus carrying her and the Holliday Girls crashes and falls off a cliff, but Diana saves them. Beth scolds Hippolyta for her treatment of her daughter.

Later, Steve is questioned by authorities until Diana and the Holliday Girls appear. Steve then coins the name "Wonder Woman" for the Amazon. Beth then remembers how she created Wonder Woman's costume for her. Soon after, Medusa attacks the hotel they were staying in and turns Steve into stone. The Amazons confront Diana and order her to come with them. She does so, under the promise of a trial.

In present time, Steve's stone body is brought forth. Diana reveals she worked on the Purple Ray for it to affect men, and heals Steve from his petrification. Diana calls Hippolyta forward to testify, and discovers that she was born from Hercules's seed. Diana forgives Hippolyta's lies and embraces her, then travels back to the United States to complete her journey as Wonder Woman.

=== Volume Two ===
During World War II, Paula von Gunther leads the Nazis to their recently discovered Paradise Island to conquer it. The battle is one sided as the Amazons led by Queen Hippolyta defeat the Nazis, send the men to Aphrodite's World to purge their love for war and replace it with loving authority, and decide to keep Paula to train her to submit to the Amazon Code at Improvement Island. Before she leaves, she spots a young Diana and asks who she is.

In the present day, Diana aka Wonder Woman has become an icon. But a secret Council inside the Pentagon, with information taken from the Nazis on Paradise Island, plot to conquer the island and harness their technology. They bring in Dr. Leon Zeiko to do the job. Diana holds an assembly, praising her Amazonian home and their ways compared to "man's world", but her audience only offer criticism, with one asking "why can't you put a lasso 'round the whole world?", leaving Diana questioning her mission. Diana talks to her mother, whose only advise are to learn the sorrow and regret that are on her mind. Just then, Hippolyta is alerted by Nubia and Mala that the Swastika was left in Diana's old room.

Diana plays chase with Steve Trevor in the Government's new plane that they hope to surpass Amazonian technology, only for the plane to explode, but Steve is saved. Diana and Steve have a conversation over the world's view of Diana, explaining that she intimidates powerful people, while Diana defends herself while explaining that the Government could attack the island and prove how futile that would be. Just then, General Darnell asks for Diana's help. In the Middle East, terrorists attack a negotiator and plot to traffic captured women when Diana shows up and defeats them. She meets the negotiator, who is Zeiko in disguise. Having a drink, Diana comments on his work on Weaponized Communication, when Zeiko turns the conversation into Diana's work, criticizing her gospel of submitting to loving authority in relationships, how her lasso is more mind control, and finally Diana herself as someone perfect who cannot fathom to inspire those who aren't like her by any means. Diana can do nothing but defend her work as ending endless war and bridging their worlds together. When she leaves, Zeiko concludes Diana is like any manipulative woman. General Darnell meets with his superior about lying to Diana about the "mission", as the Pentagon plans to destroy Wonder Woman and attack her island they hate and fear. Darnell meets with Maxwell Lord who presents his brand new battle suits called A.R.E.S. General Darnell meets with Steve to tell him what's going on, and later Steve meets with Diana about Zeiko, but his words fall on deaf ears.

Back on Paradise Island, a captured Paula reveals her intent was because Diana is her idol. At the same time, Hippolyta is told something horrible by The Fates. Diana meets with Zeiko, and upon kissing her, Zeiko asks her to use the lasso on him. Using it, Zeiko reveals the Government believe Diana to be a scout from a technologically advance force planning an invasion, and that he was hired to help them, and claims Darnell and Steve are part of it. Diana doesn't believe him at first, but then asks what she could do, and Zeiko asks for himself to use the lasso on her, to see if her mission is true. She grants him, just as Zeiko uses his post-hypnotic submission on Diana to lose her powers and will. Steve comes over and Zeiko controls Diana to attack him, and she obeys. Along with revealing that the terrorist attack was a fake, Zeiko tells Diana that the Pentagon needs her to be provocative, and gets her ready for her big day. Back at Paradise Island, Paula murders Hippolyta, grabs her girdle, and escapes the island.

At the Women's March, Diana speaks about the horrors of men onto women, and declares that the Amazons will come to "man's world" now to bring men to their knees, declaring war. The council hears the news, just as Maxwell Lord comes in and takes over to prepare her invasion, and reveals the trigger to control the one person to kill Wonder Woman: Paula von Gunther. Diana sulks in her trailer when Beth Candy reveals Zeiko is known as a pickup artist and master manipulator named "Dr. Psycho". Zeiko reveals himself and tells Diana that her mother is dead just as Paula arrives and the two women fight. Diana and Paula's fight reaches the White House, where Diana demands Paula reveal why she killed her mother, and Paula reveals she was controlled to do so, but she also did it because she loved Diana and wanted to rule with her over "man's world". The Amazons arrive and take Diana, Paula, and Zeiko back to Paradise Island.

With the A.R.E.S. battle suits prepared for battle, Diana believes Ares the God of War is behind the conflicts of "man's world", and assumes her place as the new Queen of the Amazons.

=== Volume Three ===
Diana, now queen of the Amazons, assembles the disparate Amazonian tribes for the first time in a millennium. Max Lord's assault on Paradise Island with his destructive A.R.E.S. armors is on the horizon, and in order to weather the war that is coming, Wonder Woman needs the full might of her sisters by her side. Diana wants to bring her message of peace to Man's World, but Max Lord's war can destroy the world and the Amazons to ashes.

== Reception ==
IGN gave the title a positive review, stating that "Wonder Woman: Earth One Volume One is not going to be a comic for everyone. This original graphic novel offers a more provocative take on the iconic heroine, one that returns her to her Golden Age, bondage-obsessed roots and dabbles in material some readers might find uncomfortable". The same site gave a positive review to the Volume Two, saying that it offers a "clever" take on the villains, but criticized the "choppy" pacing and lack of story resolution. Ray Goldfield of GeekDad called the Volume Three of the title as "the most unique and bizarre of the Earth One books".

Artist Yanick Paquette won the Best Artist Shuster Award 2017 for Volume One and got nomination for best artist at both Shuster Award and Eisner Awards for his work on Volume Two.

Wonder Woman: Earth One was #1 on The New York Times' Hardcover Graphic Books Best Seller List for May 1, 2016.

== Foreign versions ==
Since its original release, Wonder Woman: Earth One has been translated Portuguese, French, Italian, Japanese, Turkish, Spanish, German, Russian and Dutch:

- Mulher Maravilha: Terra Um (ISBN 978-8583682066), Panini Comics Brasil, Brazil
- Wonder Woman: Erde Eins Band 1 (ISBN 978-3741600289), Panini Comics Deutschland, Germany
- Wonder Woman: Earth One (ISBN 978-1401268633), Shogakukan-Shueisha Production, Japan
- Wonder Woman: Yeni Dünya Cilt Bir (ISBN 978-9750839948), Yapı Kredi Yayınları, Turkey
- Wonder Woman: Tierra Uno Volumen 1 (ISBN 978-84-16796-72-4), ECC Comics, Spain
- Wonder Woman: Terre-Un (ISBN 979-1-02-681124-4), Urban Comics, France
- Wonder Woman: Terra Uno Volume 1 (ISBN 978-8-89351217-6), RW Edizione, Italy
- Mulher-Maravilha: Terra Um (ISBN 978-8583682066), Levoir/Público, Portugal
- Wonder Woman: Earth One Boek 1, RW Lion, Netherlands
- Wonder Woman: Terra Unu Volumul 1 (ISBN 978-6067105131), Editura Grafic, Romania
