= Batman: Earth One =

Graphic novel series published by DC Comics

- Cover page for Volume One of Batman: Earth One (July 2012)

Publication information
- Publisher: Earth One (DC Comics)
- Genre: Crime fiction Superhero
- Publication date: (Volume One); July 4, 2012 (Volume Two); May 6, 2015 (Volume Three); June 8, 2021
- Main character(s): Batman; Harvey Bullock; Catwoman; Jessica Dent; Jim Gordon; Killer Croc; Alfred Pennyworth

Creative team
- Written by: Geoff Johns
- Artist: Gary Frank
- Inker: Jonathan Sibal
- Letterer: Rob Leigh
- Colorist: Brad Anderson
- Editor: Eddie Berganza

Collected editions
- Volume 1: ISBN 1401232086
- Volume 2: ISBN 1401241859
- Volume 3: ISBN 1401259049

Batman: Earth One is a series of American graphic novels written by Geoff Johns and illustrated by Gary Frank. The series is a modernized re-imagining of DC Comics' long-running Batman comic book franchise as part of the company's Earth One imprint. Earth One's Batman exists alongside other revamped DC characters in Earth One titles, including Superman: Earth One and Wonder Woman: Earth One, as well as other graphic novels.

Batman: Earth One takes place in the alternate continuity of the Earth One universe, which features a reinterpretation of Batman's story. The characters presented are vastly different from the depiction they are usually associated with. For instance: Batman himself, who is usually depicted as a near-perfect crimefighter in the comic books, is portrayed in the novels as inexperienced and prone to mistakes, although he gains practice and becomes more competent as the volumes go by.

Announced in 2009, the Batman: Earth One series was launched with the publication of its Volume One on July 4, 2012. Volume Two was originally scheduled for release in 2013, but was postponed and debuted on May 6, 2015. Originally scheduled for a release in 2018, Volume Three had been pushed back for three years until published on June 8, 2021. The series received a positive response from both critics and readers, with Frank's artwork being singled out for praise.

== Plot summary ==
=== Volume One ===
Bruce Wayne is the eight-year-old son of Dr. Thomas Wayne, a mayoral candidate for Gotham City, and Martha Wayne (née Arkham). After receiving death threats, Thomas contacts his friend from his military service, Alfred Pennyworth, to become the head of security at Wayne Manor. During an outing with his parents, Bruce is taken hostage by a mugger. He demands that the Waynes pay a ransom for the return of their son and attempts to remove Martha's pearl necklace. Thomas tries to intervene and the criminal shoots them both in front of Bruce. Following Bruce's return to Wayne Manor, Alfred learns that he has been named as Bruce's legal guardian by the Wayne parents in the event of their absence. Alfred reluctantly agrees and presents himself to Bruce as his butler.

As a teenager, Bruce befriends his classmate, Jessica Dent, and develops a rivalry with her twin brother, Harvey. He also learns about Arkham Manor, where Martha lived as a child; her mother suffered a mental breakdown when Martha was 12 years old, murdering her husband and then committing suicide. Arkham Manor is believed to be cursed due to the actions of Martha's mother, causing all members of the Arkham bloodline to become insane. Bruce convinces Alfred to train him in various forms of martial arts and acrobatics, and also learns investigative techniques. Following this training, he discovers evidence that Mayor Oswald Cobblepot was involved in his parents' assassination.

Years later, Bruce's investigation leads him to Jacob Weaver, a police detective who was the first to arrive at the Wayne murder scene and later left the police to work in the mayor's office. Bruce dons a bat-themed costume as a disguise to frighten his parents' alleged killers. He attacks Weaver, but the grapple gun he developed malfunctions and Weaver escapes. Bruce then seeks the help of Lucius Fox, a 22-year-old intern at Wayne Medical, who agrees to repair his equipment in exchange for funding for a project to develop artificial limbs for amputees, which Fox wants to use to give his five-year-old niece a new arm.

Meanwhile, Detective James Gordon of the Gotham City Police Department meets his new partner, Harvey Bullock, an experienced LAPD detective who has come to Gotham to solve the Wayne murders and revive his fading career. Following an altercation between Bruce and Cobblepot's bodyguards at a function organized by the mayor, Bruce's alter ego is named "Batman" by the press and becomes a public sensation. Cobblepot, infuriated by Batman's actions, orders one of his henchmen, a serial killer named "Birthday Boy", to kill Weaver. Batman's investigation takes him to Arkham Manor, where Birthday Boy had been placing his victims.

A chain of events leads to the kidnapping of Gordon's 17-year-old daughter, Barbara, by Axe, a petty thug working for Cobblepot. Gordon learns that Bullock is indirectly responsible for the kidnapping, since he checked out the Wayne murder files under Gordon's name, and Gordon was threatened by Cobblepot to stay out of the archives to keep him from discovering his complicity in the murders. Gordon, angry, but also terrified about what Bullock did, explains to him that he was once as fearless and resistant to Gotham's corruption as Bullock, but became afraid and compliant and lets criminals do their business so that he can protect Barbara from their wrath following his wife's death in an automobile accident, which he believes was arranged by Gotham's corrupt elite. An apologetic Bullock helps Gordon find Axe, who is violently forced to reveal Barbara's location. While she struggles against Birthday Boy, Batman, Gordon and Bullock unite in the search for her. Batman eventually intercepts Birthday Boy while Gordon rescues Barbara; Batman overpowers the serial killer, who is then arrested by Gordon and Bullock.

In a subsequent confrontation between Batman and Cobblepot, the mayor reveals his intention was for Weaver to murder Thomas, but he and his wife ran into the mugger instead. Cobblepot then prepares to kill an unmasked Bruce but is fatally shot by Alfred. Axe is arrested and Birthday Boy, whose identity is revealed as Ray Salinger, is transferred to the Crane Institute for the Criminally Insane, run by Dr. Jonathan Crane, from which Salinger originally escaped.

Barbara begins to idolize Batman, studying martial arts and criminology, and sketching potential "Batgirl" costumes. Bullock, on the other hand, is traumatized by his experiences and succumbs to alcoholism. After Cobblepot's crimes are posthumously outed, he is replaced by Jessica as the mayor of Gotham. Fox, after seeing Batman uses the grapple gun he repaired for Bruce on the news, deduces that the young billionaire is the vigilante and begins building a bat-themed arsenal for him, hoping to become a part of the action. Bruce is left disappointed by the truth behind his parents' death, but with Alfred's encouragement, decides that he will continue on to refine his new persona as Batman. The story concludes with the depiction of an enigmatic man reviewing information on Batman.

=== Volume Two ===
Cover page for Volume Two of Batman: Earth One (May 2015)

The events depicted in Volume Two occur six months after those of Volume One. A mysterious serial killer, who calls himself "The Riddler", is murdering people in Gotham, hoping to get Batman's attention. Elsewhere, after losing track of one of the drug dealers he fought during a car chase, Bruce has Fox (who is promoted as the Head of Wayne Enterprises' Research and Development department) build him a custom-made race car. Bullock remains traumatized over the travesties that occurred in Arkham Manor, and Gordon tries to help him to combat his alcoholism, as he needs Bullock as an ally in order to combat corruption in Gotham.

Jessica comes to Wayne Manor to visit Bruce in the hopes that, as the CEO of Wayne Enterprises, he could help her find five of the remaining members of Cobblepot's criminal organization within the city's legislature. Despite Cobblepot's death, his criminal empire remains active because of these five members, corrupt officials who have taken over the city's police department, housing commission, public works, city council and the state court. Along with her brother Harvey, Jessica is desperate to find the officials in order to destroy Cobblepot's legacy once and for all. Batman seeks Gordon's help in aiding her efforts.

After bombing the city museum, the Riddler is chased by Batman. The Riddler knocks Batman out from behind, causing him to fall off a building and onto a balcony. He wakes up the next day to find himself inside the apartment of an attractive woman who has tended to his injuries. Later, Batman asks Gordon to train him in forensics and deduction, with Gordon noting that Batman has a gifted investigative mind. As they track the Riddler to the sewers, Batman encounters Waylon Jones, a benign but mutated man whom the media dubbed "Killer Croc", who is seeking refuge underground out of fear of society's discrimination over his reptilian appearance. With Jones' help, Batman discovers the Riddler's hideout, but fails to stop him from bombing a rapid transit train. Using clues, Batman deduces that the Riddler's killings were not random. He leaves Gordon an encrypted cellphone to contact him, calling it his "Bat-Signal".

Meeting with Bruce, Jessica reveals that she has known his identity as Batman since her visit to Wayne Manor; both also declare their love for each other. With new information from Gordon, Bruce discovers the Riddler is targeting the people who Jessica and Harvey are trying to find. He is later accused of being the Riddler after the real Riddler frames him in an attempt to divert Gordon's investigation, but Jessica is able to provide Bruce an alibi so that he is not arrested. During a riot at the police precinct caused by the Riddler, Cobblepot's former henchman Sal Maroni fatally stabs Harvey and disfigures the right side of his face with a Molotov cocktail before he dies. Jessica, in her grief, scars the left side of her face by pressing it against Harvey's burns in order to match her face with his. After chasing the Riddler through the city, Batman subdues the killer with Jones' assistance.

After he is cleared of all charges, Bruce generously writes a check to help the police department rebuild their precinct. Bullock begins to recover from his alcoholism. Batman offers Jones a place in Wayne Manor, seeking his help in finding a location to hide his "Batmobile". After Gordon arrests Christopher Black, a police captain who was one of Cobblepot's lieutenants, he is promoted to captain. Upon visiting her at the hospital, Bruce discovers that the trauma of Harvey's death has caused Jessica to develop a split personality based on Harvey's. In the epilogue, Bruce discovers through a phone call with Alfred that the attractive woman he met earlier as Batman is not the apartment's resident, but actually a cat burglar who was robbing the building at the time.

=== Volume Three ===
Cover page for Volume Three of Batman: Earth One (June 2021)

The events depicted in Volume Three occur one month after those of Volume Two. In Maine, a police officer sees that an abandoned psychiatric hospital has been broken into. Inside, he finds a delusional elderly man who attacks him, yelling for his daughter Martha.

Bruce, Alfred and Jones find an old subterranean subway station that connects Wayne and Arkham Manors to the rest of Gotham. Bruce plans to use the location both as a bunker to hide the Batmobile and as a safehouse to expand his operation as Batman. Suddenly, Gordon calls to alert him of criminals with military-grade weapons. Batman stops them, with the last gunman incapacitated by the cat-burglar he met a month earlier, who escapes with the criminals' stolen money. Jessica – wearing a mask – is escorted by Bruce to a press conference where she opens a homeless shelter named after Harvey. During the conference, Bruce and Alfred are called to the Gotham Mental Hospital, where they learn that the elderly man from the prologue is actually Adrian Arkham, Bruce's maternal grandfather. Skeptical that his grandfather might be alive, Bruce takes Adrian to Wayne Manor.

Batman eavesdrops on an arms deal and learns that a criminal uprising is brewing in Gotham, fueled by advanced weaponry brought in from Metropolis. He is caught and a firefight ensues, but the woman from earlier (Catwoman) saves him. He interrogates the criminals and learns that Harvey might be alive and behind the uprising. Bruce remembers Jessica waking up after her accident and briefly claiming to be Harvey. Worried, he meets with Jessica to confront her, only for "Harvey" to call her and tell them that he's going to destroy Gotham.

Adrian escapes to Arkham Manor and tries to jump from the roof, but Bruce stops him. Adrian reveals the history of their ancestors: as the Arkhams helped build Gotham, they were viciously attacked by bats, which they believed to be representatives of native spirits. He claims that these events bound a terrible curse to the Arkham bloodline, describing how his wife went mad over the loss of her son and tried to kill Martha, Bruce's mother; he claims to have sacrificed his life to save their daughter. Bruce brings his grandfather home, promising to help him work through his worsening mental health.

Catwoman alerts Batman of a final shipment of explosives arriving in Gotham that night. Gordon and Bullock head off to stop it. As the weapons arrive, Adrian lights Arkham Manor on fire, while Batman and Gordon learn that Jessica Dent is "Harvey Dent", suffering from a dissociative identity disorder. Adrian reveals his allegiance to Jessica and forces Batman inside the burning Arkham Manor. Jessica wants to destroy Gotham for taking so many lives, including that of her brother's, while Adrian claims he wants to save Bruce's soul. Batman frees himself with Catwoman's help and subdues Adrian. Learning that Gordon has halted the explosives shipment, a distraught Jessica leaps to her death, but is saved by Jones at the last moment. Adrian emerges from Arkham Manor, his face melting, and tries to kill Batman before Gordon stops him. With the crisis averted, Gotham is safe.

Bruce learns that Adrian was actually an imposter capable of changing his appearance at a cellular level, with layers of fingerprints from three different men found beneath his layers of shifting skin. Bruce promises to get Jessica the help she needs and decides to continue his mission to protect Gotham, unburdened by the troubled history of his family.

As Bruce becomes a more experienced crimefighter over time, he recruits more "outsiders" to his crusade. During a performance at Haly's Circus, a "clown" kills the circus' prized Flying Graysons act. This leaves the late Grayson couple's young son Dick an orphan, who is taken in by Bruce to eventually become a member of Batman's circle. Gordon's daughter Barbara wants to learn more about Batman, and eventually dons a costume as well. After facing rampant injustice and persecution in the city, Rory Regan also decides to fight back against Gotham's criminal underbelly. Soon Robin, Batgirl and Ragman join Batman, Alfred, Waylon, Fox and Catwoman as members of this new team, based out of the now-named Batcave. Bruce also helps turn Arkham Manor into a state-of-the-art mental hospital called Arkham Asylum, with Jessica becoming a patient. Later, Winslow Schott's prisoner transport is stopped by a mysterious clown. The clown claims he needs Schott's help to "kill a lot of children, and their pets". When Schott asks who his new employer is, the clown replies, "I'm Nobody".

== Publication ==
Batman: Earth One is the second original graphic novel by DC Comics as part of the Earth One line established in 2009. It follows the 2010 release of Superman: Earth One, marking the first collaboration between writer Geoff Johns and artist Gary Frank on a Batman story. Batman: Earth One was planned to be printed in 2010, but was held to be released at the same time as The Dark Knight Rises film on July 4, 2012. Volume Two was originally scheduled for a 2013 release, but was postponed and, as a result, launched on May 6, 2015.

After 2012's Volume One and 2015's Volume Two of Batman: Earth One, Volume Three was originally scheduled to debut in 2018, but was pushed back for 2021 due to Johns and Frank's work on DC Rebirth and Doomsday Clock. Volume Three was "finished" and ultimately published on June 8, 2021, resulting in a six-year gap between Volumes Two and Three, exactly twice the gap between Volumes One and Two.

== Reception ==
Volume One

Batman: Earth One received a mostly positive response from critics and readers, with Johns' writing and unique, realistic and humanizing re-imagining of the titular character, along with Frank's artwork, being singled out for praise. Barnes & Noble lists the graphic novel as one of the "Best Quirky, Beautiful, Different Books of 2012". It peaked at #9 on The New York Times' Hardcover Graphic Book Best Seller List. IGN listed it as #25 on their list of best Batman stories of all time.

Entertainment Weekly wrote: "Fresh, accessible, emotionally resonant…. This Batman graphic novel offers readers the chance to watch Batman actually grow and develop — through trial and error, success and failure — into an indomitable crime fighter". David S. Goyer, co-writer of Batman Begins, The Dark Knight Rises, Man of Steel and Batman v Superman: Dawn of Justice, was positive to the title, saying that Geoff Johns and Gary Frank managed to make the Batman legend "endlessly" malleable. HuffPost gave a positive review to the book and called it "thoroughly captivating". Damon Lindelof, co-creator and executive producer of Lost, said: "Original, surprising and emotional, Batman: Earth One is a must-read".

In his review for Batman: Earth One, Joey Esposito of IGN wrote positively about the novel, complimenting both Johns' writing and Frank's artwork, as well as the characters featured in it, especially Bullock, "whose journey is perhaps the most profoundly jarring throughout the course of the book". By the end of the review, he wrote that "Batman: Earth One is a resounding success. There's no supplemental material to speak of, but the beautiful characterization, interesting new direction, and stunning artwork makes it an easy recommendation. When Superman: Earth One disappointed it left me cold on these books completely, but Johns and Frank have rejuvenated this line tenfold and made sure that Batman fans have a great new graphic novel to rave about". Writing for GamesRadar+, David Pepose was more critical to Batman: Earth One: he gave the graphic novel a rating of 4 out of 10, considering it "too ambitious", while also commenting that Johns "throws together enough decent ideas to fill six graphic novels, but having them all together leads to a scattered, unfocused read". Regarding the characters, Pepose felt that, due to the fast pace of the novel, fan readers were unable to "really stick around with anyone long enough to get to know them", but he praised the depictions of Alfred and Cobblepot as a "badass" and a "true power player", respectively; another character that Pepose complimented was Gordon's daughter, Barbara, deeming her "[by] far and away the most endearing character in the entire book".

Volume Two

The second volume received a widely positive response from readers and critics, with noting the improvement in storytelling and character work from the first volume, along with Frank's artwork and Johns' unique take on classic Batman characters being singled out for praise. Brian Truitt of USA Today stated that this version of Batman "is neither a 'definitive' version nor one that blows the rest away", but still liked the more interesting, unique and realistic re-imagining of the classic Batman mythos and praised the gradual evolution of Batman's role as a skilled crime-fighter. The graphic novel has made into #1 on The New York Times' Hardcover Graphic Books Best Seller List.

In a review for Volume Two of Batman: Earth One, J. Caleb Mozzocco of Comic Book Resources praised the novel as "stronger" and more "enjoyable" than the first volume, in addition to comparing the two volumes: "If the first volume read like a pitch for a big-budget TV show, this one read more like a movie, albeit the middle movie in an intended trilogy. Despite the occasional, minor weaknesses, however, Johns and Frank were both apparently much more comfortable and confident in their work on this volume, and it's a vast improvement over the first volume". As for the characters, Mozzocco highlighted both the "refreshing" take on Killer Croc and the twist about the origin of Earth One's Two-Face, saying it "should prove interesting in future volumes", apart from also regarding the betterment of Batman's skills as a detective as the greatest improvement in the second volume, albeit he criticized the Riddler's design as "weak", describing him as "basically just a scruffy, shirtless guy in a long green coat, with a question-mark face tattoo".

Reviewing Volume Two of Batman: Earth One, Matt Santori of Comicosity gave the graphic novel a rating of 8.5 out of 10, and said: "Another great addition to the Earth One universe, establishing the youth and inexperience of these heroes in a way we haven't seen on the comic page in decades, Batman: Earth One Volume [Two] is a definite buy for any fan of the Dark Knight, but particularly a good one for the uninitiated when paired with Volume [One]. He may not represent the monolith that we know him to be today, but this Batman is aggressively human, and is a great place to start if you want to see a Dark Knight built from the ground up". Terry Miles Jr. of Batman News commented on how the twists and changes in the characters proved to be the most appealing part of Volume Two for him. According to Miles, a "notable change" in the Batman: Earth One series is the relationship between Batman and Alfred, which is not only a contrast to the usual dynamic of the duo in the comics, but also reflects the relationship between retired Bruce Wayne and his successor Terry McGinnis seen in the animated series Batman Beyond, set in the DC Animated Universe.

== In other media ==
=== Television ===
In the TV show Gotham, Alfred (Sean Pertwee) takes inspiration from both his mainstream and his Earth One counterparts, drawing elements from the two versions, such as him being a former member of the Royal Marines who is the loyal butler of the Wayne family, and later becomes the legal guardian of Bruce (David Mazouz) following the murder of his parents. Alfred is also a skilled martial artist, just like his Earth One incarnation, training Bruce in the combat skills he eventually uses in his adulthood as Batman.

=== Films ===
- In the 2016 film Batman v Superman: Dawn of Justice, Alfred (Jeremy Irons) is based on the Earth One iteration of the character.
- The 2022 film The Batman features various similarities with the Batman: Earth One graphic novel. Such similarities include: the portrayal of a still young and inexperienced Batman (Robert Pattinson) at the beginning of his career as a crime-fighter, the Riddler (Paul Dano) being a serial killer targeting Gotham City's corrupt elite, the depictions of Alfred (Andy Serkis) as a former Royal Marine responsible for training Bruce in combat, as well as the revelation that Martha Wayne is a member of the Arkham family. Additionally, Penguin resembles his design from Earth One.

=== Video games ===
The 2011 video game Batman: Arkham City, its 2013 prequel Batman: Arkham Origins and its 2015 sequel Batman: Arkham Knight feature a number of alternative outfits for Batman to wear, including one based on the costume used by the Earth One version of the character.

=== Comic books ===
The Earth One version of Batman makes a cameo appearance in the 10th issue of Batman: Arkham Unhinged.

== See also ==
- List of Batman comics
