= Superman: Earth One =

2010 graphic novel

- Cover for Superman: Earth One by Shane Davis

Publication information
- Publisher: Earth One (DC Comics)
- Publication date: (Volume One); October 27, 2010 (Volume Two); October 31, 2012 (Volume Three); February 4, 2015
- Main character: Superman

Creative team
- Written by: J. Michael Straczynski
- Penciller(s): Shane Davis (1-2); Ardian Syaf (3)
- Inker: Sandra Hope
- Letterer: Rob Leigh
- Colorist: Barbara Ciardo
- Editor(s): Eddie Berganza; Adam Schlagman

Collected editions
- Volume 1: ISBN 1401224687
- Volume 2: ISBN 1401231969
- Volume 3: ISBN 1401241840

Superman: Earth One is a series of graphic novels written by J. Michael Straczynski and illustrated by Shane Davis. The series is a modernized re-imagining of DC Comics' long-running Superman comic book franchise as the inaugural title of the company's Earth One imprint. Earth One's Superman exists with other revamped DC characters in Earth One titles, including Batman: Earth One and Wonder Woman: Earth One, as well as other graphic novels.

The first volume was published in the US on October 27, 2010, by DC Comics, and in the UK in 2011 by Titan Books. Superman: Earth One Volume Two was released on October 31, 2012. Superman: Earth One Volume Three was released on February 4, 2015, with Ardian Syaf illustrating the book instead of Davis.

== Background and creation ==
Writer J. Michael Straczynski said the project was a dream come true, as writing Superman was among his plans which also included Babylon 5. Two years before its publication, Straczynski signed a contract with DC Comics. Before Straczynski's announcement, he had kept the project secret while he worked on the Red Circle characters and The Brave and the Bold.

Straczynski used his experiences as a journalist to add detail to the Daily Planet environment, for example, the character Jimmy Olsen, called Jim in the books, is depicted as stronger and smarter than his mainstream counterpart. Straczynski wanted to retell the beginning of Clark Kent's transition to Superman, and explore possible alternatives to Clark becoming a superhero. Straczynski said that "he [Kent] could have been rich as an athlete, researcher, any number of things. There's a flashback scene to when Martha Kent finishes his uniform and gives it to him as a gift, hoping he will go that way. He looks at it and says, in essence, 'Shouldn't there be a mask?' She says no, that 'when people see how powerful you are, all the things you can do, they're going to be terrified ... unless they can see your face, and see there that you mean them no harm. The mask ... is that what you're going to have to wear the rest of your life'". Straczynski introduced a new villain character with a connection to Krypton, who was used to explain its destruction.

Shane Davis removed the stereotypes associated with depictions of the civilian and superhero identities of Clark Kent. Davis drew the 20-year-old Clark wearing layers of clothing, showing that he is trying to blend in with his associates and differing from previous depictions of Kent wearing a suit, tie, and glasses, which Davis said, "didn't make sense". Davis also re-imagined Metropolis, which was historically depicted as an expanse of art deco buildings. Davis designed the city to look more realistic.

== Plot summary ==
=== Volume One ===
Clark Kent, a new arrival in the city of Metropolis, applies for various open jobs. His last stop on his job search is at the Daily Planet newspaper, where he meets Perry White, James "Jim" Olsen and Lois Lane. When Clark discovers that the Daily Planet and the wider newspaper industry are in decline, he decides not to apply and flies into space.

Clark thinks upon his history, and how his adoptive parents, Jonathan and Martha Kent, told him how they found him while hiking through woodland: they witnessed a spaceship crashing and found a baby boy in the wreckage, deciding to keep him. Shortly afterward, the U.S. government arrived at the crash site. The Kents kept a small fragment of debris from the ship and learned of its, and the child's, extraterrestrial origins. Back in the present, Clark visits his late father's grave and says he feels incapable of being a superhero. Instead, he decides to begin a career and hopes that his father would accept that.

The next day, Major Sandra Lee, a U.S. soldier studying advanced technology, revisits the crashed spaceship, which has regenerated its damaged and lost parts. Scientists under Lee there have found symbols inside the atomic structure of the ship. Clark discovers his apartment is on fire and quickly enters to recover the fragment of spacecraft and a red and blue outfit his mother made for him from the cloth he was wrapped in as an infant. Alone, he checks the fragment with his enhanced vision when he is hit with energy, becomes unconscious and falls from the sky. The fragment talks and connects itself back to the ship in order to download more information. Just then, an invading alien armada attacks Earth's major cities. The military fights back, but the aliens defeat them. Jim and Lois are almost killed in the attack. Clark, still unconscious, is shown the last moments of his homeworld, the planet Krypton.

Clark, born as Kal-El, is the son of Jor-El and Lara Lor-Van, who waited until the last minute to dispatch him from Krypton so that the shockwaves of the planet's destruction would hide his escape. Tyrell, the leader of the alien armada, reveals himself to Earth but does not reveal his identity and purpose. He issues an ultimatum: Earth will be destroyed if someone Tyrell has been looking for does not surrender to him. Lee and the scientists agree that the person Tyrell is looking was in the crashed ship. Clark tries to attack the aliens without revealing himself, but Jim's photographs show a human-shaped red and blue blur. Clark goes for help at a research company that was about to employ him, but he finds that it is corrupt. Tyrell notices Jim taking pictures and almost kills him until Clark, who can no longer be a bystander, destroys a robot. Now aware of Clark's presence, Tyrell prepares to escalate his attack. Clark decides to wear the costume his mother made and reveals himself to the world as Superman.

Superman starts destroying the armada, and Tyrell reveals himself. He turns out to be from the planet Dheron, an enemy planet of Krypton; a mysterious man provided Dheron with a war machine designed to destroy Krypton's core. Although Krypton was destroyed, Clark survived, and Tyrell's mission is to find and kill him. Tyrell proceeds to activate several war machines to destroy Earth, and hits Superman with a red solar energy beam that pins him down. He proves to be Superman's physical match but leaves to make final preparations. Because Superman is the cause of the invasion, no one in Metropolis is willing to help. Lois and Jim get Superman out of the energy beam, making him regain his strength. He and Tyrell fight again; this time Superman gains the upper hand by burning Tyrell with his heat vision. Superman's ship becomes fully regenerated, takes off to find him and knocks Tyrell from behind. He then enters Tyrell's spacecraft and destroys it from the inside. Tyrell tries to stop him but is defeated. The invasion is over, and Superman flies away. At a government base, Lee contemplates Superman's motives. She is put in charge of researching Superman and his origin.

After his ordeal, Clark walks home. The boss of the research company finds him and offers him a job, but he declines. Instead, he purchases some new clothing and formulates a "Clark Kent disguise". He returns to the Daily Planet, which is more enthusiastic and successful because of its coverage of the invasion and Superman. Clark is hired because of an interview he claims he conducted with Superman, and he bonds with his new colleagues. Public opinion of Superman is mixed: some like him and see him as a hero, while others do not trust him, as he was the cause of the invasion. In the Arctic, Superman hides his ship in a secret cave, and its sentience activates and tells him his mission: to survive, use his powers wisely and to avenge the murder of his homeworld.

=== Volume Two ===
Cover for Superman: Earth One, Volume 2 by Shane Davis

The events depicted in Volume Two occur shortly after those of Volume One. Perry promotes Clark to write articles to help rebuild the Daily Planet's reputation. Lois is suspicious of Clark and the authenticity of his Superman article, so she decides to investigate his past. Clark later meets his neighbors Lisa Lasalle and Eddie Monroe; Lisa and Clark start dating.

Criminal Raymond Jensen infiltrates S.T.A.R. Labs to destroy evidence of his crimes kept by an accomplice. Jensen is discovered by guards and while escaping is accidentally exposed to a high-energy neutrino that transforms him into an energy-absorbing supervillain called Parasite. Elsewhere, Clark learns that a tsunami is about to hit the island of Borada. He travels there to help as Superman, but the island nation's ruthless dictator, General Samsa, sees him as a threat and threatens to kill his own people if Superman does not leave; Superman complies. Meanwhile, Parasite feeds on the life force of innocent people, killing them, but is unable to satiate his newfound hunger. He decides that Superman might be powerful enough to feed him.

Distrustful of Superman, Lee proposes that the United States should develop countermeasures should he go rogue. Superman is lured to an incident at a power plant where Parasite attacks him and drains his energy, turning Parasite into a hulking beast with Superman's power. Weakened, Superman escapes while Parasite begins a rampage. Parasite's sister Theresa is informed of his actions but refuses to believe that it is her brother and takes a flight to Metropolis to see for herself.

In the Arctic, the artificial intelligence (AI) aboard Superman's Kryptonian ship has turned a cave system into the vast Fortress of Solitude. There, Superman researches a means to counter Parasite's power, and the AI offers to build a crystalline shielding warsuit. In the U.S., Lee responds to Parasite's rampage with military force; during the following attack, she realizes that Parasite is progressively weakening as the energy he absorbed fades. Parasite attacks the Daily Planet to draw out Superman; their fight leaves Superman drained and powerless, leaving him comparable to humans and capable of being injured. The next day, Superman's powers are restored and he returns to the Fortress. The AI completes the warsuit, but warns Superman that it will prevent him from using his heat vision, will block the sun's energy and that if Parasite breaches the suit and absorbs his power again, he will die.

Parasite again attacks the Daily Planet. With the warsuit, Superman fights Parasite on equal terms, but the suit gradually disintegrates as the battle continues. Theresa arrives and Parasite breaks away from the fight to hug her, accidentally absorbing her energy and killing her. Parasite blames Superman for her death and resumes his attack. Superman strikes Parasite with his full strength, incapacitating him; Parasite is taken into military custody. During a later telephone conversation with his mother, Clark hears Lisa scream from her apartment and finds she is being attacked. As Superman, he flies her attacker to Alaska and warns him not to go near her again. Lisa tells Clark that she is working part-time as a prostitute to earn extra money. Clark is heartbroken but the pair agree to remain friends.

In Borada, Superman instigates a rebellion against General Samsa, leading the country to democratic reform. He returns to his apartment and learns that Eddie has died of a heroin overdose. Clark writes an article about Eddie to raise awareness of the dangers of substance abuse. He receives a telephone call from a former teacher in Smallville and learns that Lois is investigating his past. In the epilogue, Lee recruits the wealthy scientists Alexandra "Lex" Luthor and her husband Alexander, to help find a way to kill Superman.

=== Volume Three ===
Cover for Superman: Earth One, Volume 3 by Ardian Syaf

The events depicted in Volume Three occur a week after those of Volume Two. After General Samsa's removal on Borada, the United Nations grows increasingly concerned over Superman. Dr. Alexander Luthor and his wife, Alexandra, play the footage of Superman's battle with Tyrell, revealing that Superman is vulnerable to red solar radiation. In an unspecified desert, an extraterrestrial ship lands. A mysterious humanoid figure appears and begins to develop powers under Earth's yellow sun. He then tests his powers on a group of soldiers that appear before him, killing them all with ease.

Meanwhile, Clark and Lisa celebrate, the latter obtaining a job as a model. Unbeknownst to them, Lisa accidentally drops one of her earrings on Clark's couch. At the Daily Planet, Clark and Jim discuss why Lois is investigating his past. Jim reveals to Clark that Lois is jealous of Clark's Superman coverage. Lois subsequently warns Superman that she learned from her uncle, a United Nations delegate, that the U.N. is developing fail-safes against Superman. Clark decides to confront Lois over what he found out from his family and friends. She reveals that she has ceased her investigation because she now sees Clark is a decent person of good character, and not the type of individual to fabricate a story.

Lisa has her landlord, Mr. Abrahm, open Clark's apartment door to find her earring. After she retrieves it, she finds Clark's costume in his closet, thus learning that he is Superman. She later tries to imply to Clark what she has learned, but he initially does not understand until later. When he later goes to the scene of a collapsing bridge, another super-powered being named Zod-El appears, claiming to be Superman's biological uncle. Zod claims that he has been searching for Kal-El since Krypton exploded. Though Superman is glad that he is not the only survivor of Krypton, he is skeptical of whether Zod is an ally. Elsewhere, Lois discovers melted rods from the bridge and then video footage of an unidentified flying man prior of its collapse.

Zod addresses the U.N., stating that the House of El caused Krypton to explode, and that Superman is a threat. He persuades the delegates that he is an ally and wants to help them kill Superman. Lois receives a phone call from her uncle and learns that Zod is responsible for the bridge's collapse, after which she tries to warn Superman. Zod reveals that he possesses a supply of kryptonite in his ship, from whose radiation his lead-lined skin-suit protects him. He intends to kill Superman, but Superman uses his knowledge of chemistry to cause Zod's suit to disintegrate, forcing Zod to retreat. Superman also discovers that Zod has convinced the world's governments that he is an enemy.

In the Fortress of Solitude, the AI reveals that prior to Krypton's destruction, it was in the middle of a civil war between Zod and his brother, Jor-El. Ultimately, forces loyal to the planet's Science Council defeated Zod, and in retaliation, he gave the Dheronians the weapon to destroy Krypton. Realizing that Zod intends to complete his revenge by hurting those he cares for, Superman arrives to his apartment building and fights Zod, but is no match for his uncle. Luthor and Lisa intervene to rescue him, but Luthor is killed and Lisa is critically injured. Luthor's red solar weapon greatly weakens Zod, allowing Alexandra to kill him. Blaming Superman for her husband's death, Alexandra vows to kill him as she did with Zod. She subsequently places her husband's corpse in suspended animation and takes Zod's kryptonite from his ship.

In the hospital, Lisa recovers from her wounds and professes her love for Clark. Clark reciprocates her affection and they become a couple. Clark subsequently takes her to Smallville, where he introduces her to his adoptive mother. At the U.N., Superman announces that although he is disappointed that they aligned themselves with Zod, it will not deter him from his mission to protect Earth. Seeing their fear and noting Lois' astute insights, Superman asks Lois to be his political conscience.

== Reception ==
Volume One

Superman: Earth One received mostly favorable reviews. Before its release, various websites were given copies to review. Ain't It Cool News gave the book a positive review, and said: "Essentially JMS does what he does best; he delivers the "why" behind the what..". It also praised the attack on Earth for providing a reason for Clark to become Superman, and for being a magnified representation of the fear felt during the 9-11 event. iFanboy posted two reviews of the book, giving it a 3.5 and a 4 out of 5. Both reviewers concluded that the book was a competent retelling of the Superman origin story. David Pepose of Newsarama also gave the book a positive review, and called Earth One's version of Superman an "unconscious reaction to Grant Morrison's invulnerable, easy-going All-Star Superman". Pepose also said the artwork was an iconic and cinematic, and that Clark's scene at his adoptive father's graveside and his conflict with his Kryptonian birthright were some of the best moments. He also praised the creative use of an entirely new villain. It was ranked No. 1 on The New York Times' Hardcover Graphic Books Best Seller List.

Other reviewers responded negatively to the book. Dan Phillips of IGN gave the book a 'poor' rating, and wrote that it was "riddled with creative decisions that'll leave you scratching your head in disbelief", that Superman "becomes an angst-ridden cliché with a flimsy moral center and an eye towards vengeance", and that the new villain "ranks as one of the most forgettable and shallow Superman rogues in memory". Phillips also said of Davis' artwork, commenting that "this story is told in a dull and often times ugly manner, and even the splash pages fail to truly catch your eye". Doug Zawisza of Comic Book Resources followed suit. While praising Clark's search for a purpose, he objected to the idea that Clark would only become a hero due to the environment around him, and not as a personal choice. Zawisza also disliked Tyrell, the new villain, who he thought was possibly "one of the most underwhelming characters I have ever seen in comics. His appearance is a cross between Lobo and David Bowie, but without any of the positive qualities from either of them". He also saw the book as nothing more than a "pitch book" for the new movie.

The redesign of Superman in Earth One was also reviewed in a number of major news publications, such as the New York Post, Entertainment Weekly, and Yahoo, but the articles primarily focused on images of Clark wearing a hoodie as opposed to the Superman outfit, and compared the look to that of Robert Pattinson of the Twilight series.

Volume Two

Superman: Earth One Volume Two received a relatively positive response from critics and readers. IGN's Joey Esposito stated that while the sequel "still suffers from most of the same problems as it did the first time around, the positives are far more beneficial to the greater whole". Like its predecessor, it has also made into #1 on The New York Times' Hardcover Graphic Books Best Seller List.

Volume Three

Superman: Earth One Volume Three, like its predecessors, received mostly favorable reviews. Based on eight critic reviews, volume three received a 6.9 critics' rating out of 10 on the review aggregator Comic Book Round Up. Matt Santori-Griffith of Comicosity gave the book a very positive review, rewarding it with an overall score of 9.0 out of 10. In his review, Santori-Griffith said that the book was, by far, the best entry in the Superman: Earth One series yet. Following suit, Steve Lam of Bam Smack Pow also gave the book a positive review, writing that "this is definitely a Superman for the 21st century", and of Ardian Syaf's artwork said that it was "dynamic and complement[ed] the writing of Straczynski well ... [giving the reader] something that is clear and compelling".

IGN gave the book a mixed review, bestowing upon it an overall score of 6.0 out of 10. The review gave good sentiments towards Ardian Syaf's artwork and wrote that he "shows a greater ability to use body language and facial expressions to enhance his storytelling", while also stating that Superman was given a "more well-rounded portrayal" in contrast to the previous two books. The review called the book's antagonist Zod "the weakest villain of any Earth One book to date", and that "like the previous two volumes, Superman: Earth One [Volume Three] is a very flawed experience".

Doug Zawisza from Comic Book Resources gave the book a negative review, rewarding it with a two out of five stars overall rating. Of the story, Zawisza wrote that it was "clunky and appears to be driven by a series of boxes to be checked", and that "the leaps in storytelling cross from the script to the art and back again". In closing, Zawisza described the book as "painfully uneven", and that "[r]ather than forcing mediocre stories into a reliable schedule, this installment makes a strong case to look at the product and reconsider what it is that should make the 'Earth One' line exemplary". Superman: Earth One Volume Three also made into #1 on The New York Times' Hardcover Graphic Books Best Seller List.

== In other media ==
=== Television ===
In the television series Krypton, General Zod (Colin Salmon) is depicted as the uncle of Superman, similar to his version of Earth One.

=== Film ===
- The 2013 film Man of Steel features similarities, in addition to adapting various aspects of the Superman: Earth One graphic novels. Such aspects include: a Clark Kent who is much more hesitant about revealing himself until the threat of an alien invasion forces him to do so and the story ending with him joining the Daily Planet.
- The 2025 film Superman appears to take some inspiration from the graphic novels, particularly the aspect where Superman puts an end to a conflict in a third-world country.

== See also ==
- List of Superman comics
