= Shane Davis =

American comic book artist

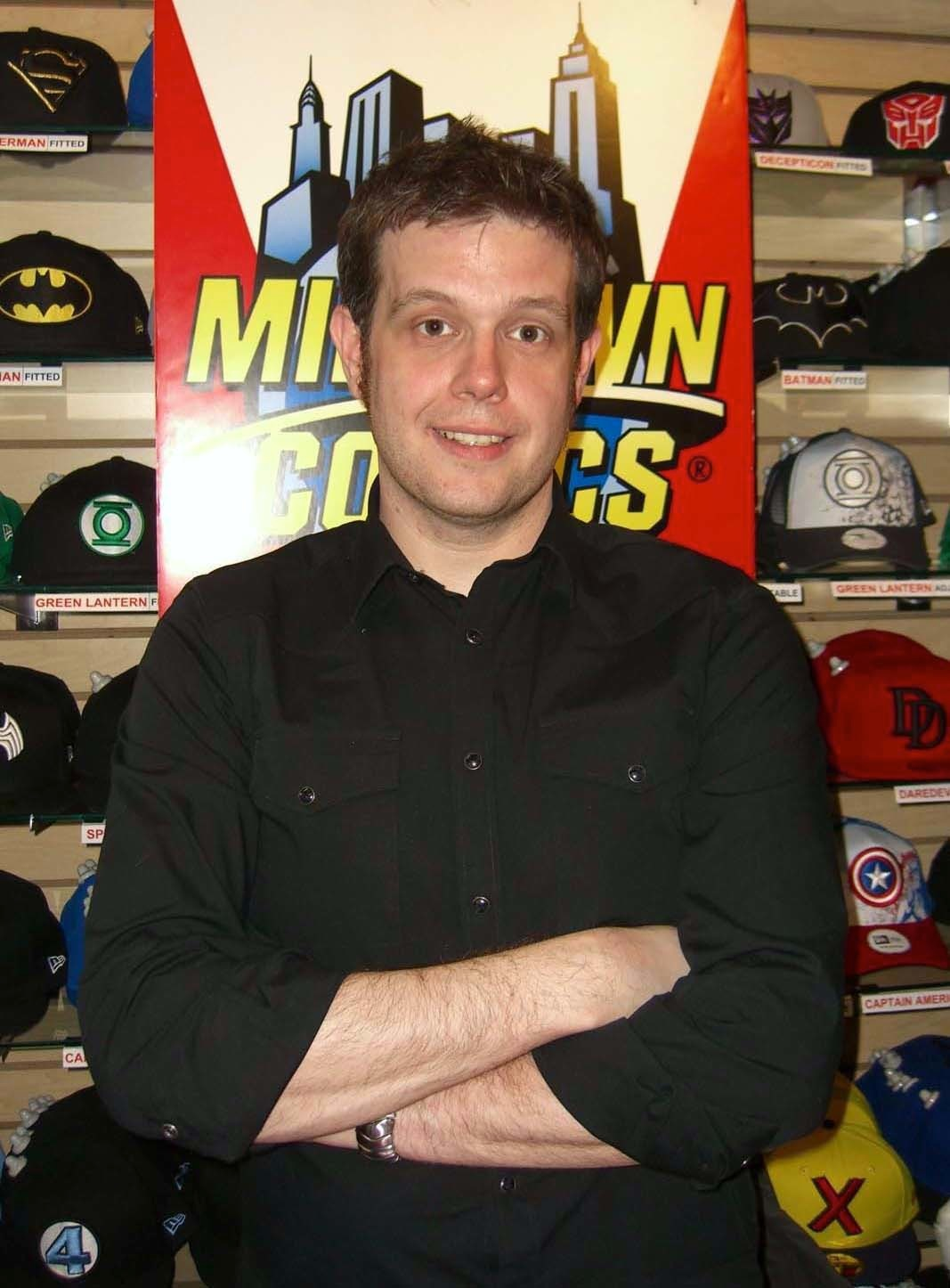
- Davis at Midtown Comics Downtown in Manhattan, April 20, 2010
- Areas: Penciller, Inker
- Notable works: Final Crisis: Rage of the Red Lanterns; Mystery in Space vol. 2 Superman/Batman; Superman: Earth One

Shane Davis is an American comic book artist best known for his work on Superman and Batman for DC Comics.

== Career ==
Shane Davis attended The Kubert School in his hometown of Dover, New Jersey. He entered the comics industry in 2003 at DC Comics by illustrating Robin #110 (March 2003) and a spot illustration in JLA-Z #3 (Jan. 2004). In the following year, he illustrated other DC titles including Nightwing #88 and Wonder Woman #201, as well as the Marvel Comics' book Marvel Halloween Ashcan 2004. In the ensuing years he illustrated a variety of titles for both publishers, such as Marvel Age Spider-Man, Action Comics, and Batman. One of his more notable Batman stories was 2006's Batman Annual #25, which featured the return of Jason Todd. That same year he illustrated Jay Faerber's series, Noble Causes #17, for Image Comics. Davis also drew the miniseries Mystery in Space vol. 2, written by Jim Starlin and featuring Captain Comet.

In 2007, Davis illustrated the first issue of the JLA/JSA crossover storyline "The Lightning Saga", and then became the penciller for Superman/Batman for issues #44–49. In 2008, Davis was tapped by writer Geoff Johns to be the artist for a Final Crisis tie-in one-shot entitled Rage of the Red Lanterns, which featured a lead-up to a story in the main Green Lantern title and its 2009 crossover Blackest Night. Davis' worked with writer J. Michael Straczynski on the Superman: Earth One graphic novel published in 2010. A second volume of Superman: Earth One was released in 2012.

Davis' projects since 2013 include the Shadow Walk graphic novel for Legendary Comics and a Batman story for the Legends of the Dark Knight series. He wrote and drew the lead story in The New Gods Special #1 (2017).

== Bibliography ==
=== 9 Lives Comics ===
- Starlight Cats (2021)
- Inglorious Rex (2022)
- Inglorious Rex - Heavy is the Crown (2024)
- Annatomic: Welcome to the Arena (2025)
- Inglorious Rex 3

=== DC Comics ===
- Action Comics #821 (among other artists) (2005)
- Batman #646, Annual #25 (2005–2006)
- Final Crisis: Rage of the Red Lanterns #1 (2008)
- Justice League of America vol. 2 #8 (full art); #25 (among other artists) (2007–2008)
- Kamandi Challenge #10 (2017)
- Legends of the Dark Knight 100-Page Super Spectacular #3 (2014)
- Mystery in Space vol. 2 #1–5, 7 (2006–2007)
- New Gods Special #1 (2017)
- Nightwing #88 (2004)
- Robin #110 (2003)
- Sideways #12 (2019)
- Superman/Batman #44–49, 75 (2008–2010)
- Superman: Earth One (2010)
- Superman: Earth One – Volume Two (2012)
- Superman/Top Cat Special #1 (2018)
- Wonder Woman vol. 2 #201 (2004)

=== Image Comics ===
- The CBLDF Presents Liberty Annual (one page) (2011)
- Noble Causes: Distant Relatives #2 (2003)

=== Legendary Comics ===
- Shadow Walk (2013)

=== Marvel Comics ===
- Marvel Age Spider-Man #13, 15 (2004–2005)
- Spider-Man Team-Up Special (Spider-Man and the Fantastic Four) #1 (2005)

| Preceded by Mike McKone | Superman/Batman penciller 2008 | Succeeded by Ed Benes; Matthew Clark; Allan Goldman; Ian Churchill |
| Preceded by n/a | Superman: Earth One artist 2010–2012 | Succeeded by Ardian Syaf |
