= List of Earth One characters =

The Earth One versions of Superman, Wonder Woman and Batman; art by Gary Frank.

The DC Comics' Earth One imprint features an extensive cast of characters which are re-imagined and modernized versions of the company's superheroes and supervillains from the DC Universe. Those characters include Superman, Batman, Wonder Woman, Green Lantern, and the Teen Titans, as well as others whose characteristics and origin stories are revised and altered to suit the 21st-century audience.

== Superman: Earth One ==
=== Introduced in Volume One ===
- Kal-El / Clark Kent / Superman is the 20-year-old adoptive son of a childless couple from Smallville. His ship crash-landed in Kansas and was discovered by Jonathan and Martha Kent, who barely managed to escape the site before the military arrived and took custody of his ship. When Jonathan and Martha revealed to Clark that he came to Earth in a spaceship, and that he was an alien, Jonathan gave Clark a piece of metal from his ship. Clark later becomes the hero Superman, but General Zod convinces the United Nations to turn against him and develop failsafes.
- Tyrell is the leader of an armada from Dheron, a neighboring world of Krypton. He invades Earth and aims to kill Krypton's last survivor or to destroy most of humanity if he does not reveal himself. After killing millions of natives, his target finally revealed himself against him. Tyrell dies when he is impaled by a sharp piece of falling equipment after his battle with Clark. Before he dies, Tyrell warns Clark that other Dheronians will also try to find and eliminate him.
- Lois Lane is a reporter at the Daily Planet. Clark Kent develops a crush on Lois at first sight and is impressed by her dedication and idealism towards her career during the Dheronians' invasion. She later writes an editorial praising Superman's heroism during the crisis and eventually becomes his ally.
- Jimmy Olsen: A photographer at the Daily Planet, Jimmy is known for his dedication to his job, deliberately putting himself in harm's way to get photos.
- Perry White is the editor-in-chief of the Daily Planet. White struggles to keep the newspaper running and refuse to give up. After the Dheronians' invasion and Superman's debut, the Daily Planet's coverage of the event saves it from bankruptcy.
- Jonathan and Martha Kent are Clark's adoptive parents who, despite their awareness of Clark's extraterrestrial origins, rescued him as an infant from the wreckage of his spaceship. Clark is especially close to his adoptive father, and was deeply affected when Jonathan died. Martha is supportive towards her son, and has faith that Clark will choose the right path. She made Clark's Superman costume using the indestructible Kryptonian clothing Clark was wrapped in when they found him.
- Jor-El was the father of Clark and husband of Lara Lor-Van, as well as a high-ranking scientist on Krypton. He attempted to convince Krypton's ruling council to use the methods of their enemies, the Dheronians, to prevent Krypton's destruction, but was ignored. He and Lara placed their infant son, Kal-El, into a prototype rocket Jor-El had built and sent him to Earth, dying alongside Krypton.
- Sandra Lee is a major in the US Army, scientist and a member of the Second Army Advanced Technology Division, a secret research facility where Clark's Kryptonian ship was held and studied.

=== Introduced in Volume Two ===
- Raymond Jensen / Parasite was a troubled youth who bullied his classmates and mutilated animals. During his adult years he would become a criminal who would do anything to get what he wanted. After an accident at S.T.A.R. Labs, he becomes a metahuman with the ability to absorb energy and life force.
- Theresa Jensen is Raymond Jensen's sister, who believes that her brother is a consultant with a real estate firm and is unaware of his status as a murderous criminal until his transformation. Raymond accidentally kills her after absorbing her energy.
- Lisa Lasalle is Clark's neighbor and later becomes his love interest. Lisa is a former escort girl and currently she has begun a career as a model. In Volume Three, she spends much of her time with Clark, whom she later reveals she is in love with. She eventually discovers Clark's secret and supports his heroic endeavors. Lisa accompanied Clark to visit his mother in Smallville.
- Alexander and Alexandra Luthor: Alexander "Lex" Luthor has a genius intellect surpassing most people but has trouble relating to people. An inventor with degrees in many fields, specializing in particle physics, he married Alexandra, whom he calls "Alexa", a xenobiologist who had an intellect rivaling his own. The two started their own consulting firm, jokingly calling it "Lex-squared" after their common nickname. Alexander later sacrifices himself to help Superman defeat Zod, with Alexandra dedicating herself to killing him.

=== Introduced in Volume Three ===
- Zod-El: Zod-El was a Kryptonian soldier, the brother of Jor-El and the one responsible for Krypton's destruction. Starting a coup d'état against the Science Council, Zod went behind his brother's help to no avail, starting a long and painful civil war that lasted six months until Zod's forces were on the run and Zod himself forced to flee Krypton to avoid arrest. On his defeat, Zod went towards Krypton's old enemy, the Dheronians, and gave them the means of finally destroy Krypton, and in return they will hunt any surviving Kryptonian and, should they fail, Zod will do it himself. He is later killed in battle with Superman.
- Bill Lane is Lois Lane's uncle, a United Nations delegate who is initially against Superman.

== Batman: Earth One ==
=== Introduced in Volume One ===
- Bruce Wayne / Batman is the son of Thomas Wayne, a mayoral candidate for Gotham City, and Martha Wayne (née Arkham). During an outing with his parents, Bruce is taken hostage by a mugger. He demands that the Waynes pay a ransom for the return of their son and as Thomas tries to intervene and the criminal shoots them both in front of Bruce. As a teenager, Bruce befriends his classmate, Jessica Dent, and develops a rivalry with her twin brother, Harvey Dent. He also learns about Arkham Manor, where his mother lived as a child. Bruce later convinces his guardian Alfred to train him in various forms of martial arts and acrobatics. Bruce also learns investigative techniques. Following this training, he discovers evidence that Mayor Oswald Cobblepot was involved in his parents' assassination. In his mid-twenties, Bruce becomes the superhero Batman, inspired by his pre-training experience at Wayne Manor.
- Alfred Pennyworth is a former soldier of the Royal Marines and a skilled martial artist and sharpshooter. He has a daughter living in Seoul, South Korea with her mother, where Alfred had previously worked at a security firm. In the military, Alfred lost a leg in an explosion. After Thomas Wayne saved his life following the explosion, he helps create a prosthetic leg to replace the one that Alfred lost, leaving Alfred indebted to him. After his friend's murder, Alfred becomes Bruce Wayne's legal guardian and mentor.
- James Gordon was an idealistic cop but the death of his wife has left him disillusioned. He tries to protect his daughter from the crime-ridden Gotham City. Faced with his new partner, Harvey Bullock, and the subsequent emergence of Batman, Gordon's own principles are ultimately revived, and sets to fight the corruption of Gotham. In Volume Two, Gordon becomes police captain after arresting his predecessor Christopher Black, who is exposed as one of Oswald Cobblepot's lieutenants.
- Barbara Gordon / Batgirl is a 17-year-old library assistant and daughter of James Gordon, who lost her mother at an early age. Taking on a supportive role for her father, Barbara is soon captured by Cobblepot's henchman, the Birthday Boy. Her rescue by Batman then inspires her to consider a role in vigilantism and starts designing a costume of her own based on his. As of Volume Two, she is enrolled in University of California, Berkeley, majoring in computer science.
- Lucius Fox is a young but brilliant intern at Wayne Medical, who wishes to develop a cybernetic prosthetic for his niece, who has lost her arm in an accident. He later becomes the head of Wayne Enterprises' research and development division, creating Batman's gadgets and suit.
- Harvey Bullock is a detective from the Los Angeles Police Department and the host of the cancelled reality show Hollywood Detectives. Bullock requests to transfer to Gotham to look for the chance to revive his fame.
- Oswald Cobblepot is the mayor of Gotham City. He holds a grudge against the Wayne family, believing they have disgraced the Cobblepot legacy. Cobblepot is later killed by Alfred, after which his crimes are made public.
- Harvey Dent, along with his twin sister Jessica, were friends with young Bruce Wayne from preparatory school, though Harvey had a rather antagonistic relationship with him. In his adult years, Harvey becomes Gotham City's district attorney. After taking office, he and Jessica investigate Oswald Cobblepot. Harvey is later murdered by Cobblepot's former henchman Sal Maroni.
- Jessica Dent is the twin sister of Harvey Dent and the president of the city's board of supervisors. Jessica has been Bruce Wayne's friend since they were teenagers; each harbors romantic feelings for each other since childhood despite Jessica's brother's disapproval. She is well known in the city for her ongoing feud with Oswald Cobblepot, and assumes the role of Mayor following Cobblepot's death. In Volume Two, she disfigures the left side of her face after her brother's death and is implied to have developed dissociative identity disorder.
- Thomas Wayne was a physician who had run for mayor against Oswald Cobblepot, who had attempted to arrange his opponent's murder during the latter's outing to a movie with his wife Martha and his Bruce, but a mugger got to them first and killed Thomas and Martha.
- Martha Arkham-Wayne was the wife of Thomas Wayne and mother of Bruce Wayne. Her maiden name was Arkham instead of Kane in this alternate continuity. Martha's father was murdered by her mother when she was twelve, leaving her family with a series of scandals, including a rumor that the Arkham bloodline is insane. Martha was a campaign manager of her husband's mayoral campaign against Oswald Cobblepot, who had planned to have a corrupt cop, Jacob Weaver, murder Thomas, but a mugger got to her family first and killed both her and her husband, leaving Bruce orphaned.
- Jacob Weaver: A corrupt detective in the Gotham City Police Department who quit the force to work for Cobblepot, he is killed by one of Cobblepot's henchmen.
- Ray Salinger: Salinger is a serial killer known as "The Birthday Boy", who had escaped from Crane Institute under Cobblepot's arrangements. He has a murderous fixation with his first victim, 15-year-old debutante Amanda Grant, and refers to all his victims as "Amanda". He is dubbed Birthday Boy for his tendency to give victims a cake before killing them.
- Christopher Black is Gotham City Police Department's police captain and a minor character who appears in Volume One. In Volume Two, he is discovered to be corrupt and is exposed as one of Cobblepot's lieutenants, with Jim Gordon succeeding him.
- Axe is a drug dealer who works for Oswald Cobblepot and finds pleasure in intimidating honest police officers like James Gordon. He is eventually beaten and arrested after the introduction of Gordon's new partner, Harvey Bullock.
- Crispus Allen is a detective from the Gotham City Police Department and partner to Renee Montoya.
- Renee Montoya is a detective from the Gotham City Police Department and partner to Crispus Allen.

=== Introduced in Volume Two ===
- Riddler is a serial killer who is obsessed with riddles and targets Batman, attempting to learn his secret identity to satiate his curiosity. In Volume Two, it is revealed that he once worked as Oswald Cobblepot's lieutenants, and is targeting his fellow members, staging a coup to take over Cobblepot's criminal empire.
- Waylon Jones / Killer Croc is a social outcast with severe ichthyosis who was sold to Haly's Circus and billed as the "Reptile Boy". He later escapes, befriends Batman, and joins the Outsiders.
- Sal Maroni is a former henchman of Oswald Cobblepot. Following Cobblepot's death and the wake of a police investigation into his criminal enterprise, Maroni is arrested and placed into a hearing by Harvey Dent to reveal any information regarding to Cobblepot's remaining criminal associates. Riddler later frees Maroni from prison, after which he murders Harvey.
- Selina Kyle / Catwoman appears and helps Batman, tending his wounds after he falls in her apartment, while chasing the Riddler. She introduces herself as a single mother to Batman, and they spend together during that time. Batman later discovers that she is neither the apartment's tenant or a mother, but a cat burglar who was robbing the building at the time.
- Jack Drake was a lieutenant who is later targeted and killed by the Riddler.

=== Introduced in Volume Three ===
- Adrian Arkham is Bruce Wayne's late maternal grandfather.
- Clayface is a dangerous criminal with the ability to alter his appearance. He masquerades as Adrian Arkham for most of the book, and is implied he has lost his sanity due to shapeshifting.
- Winslow Schott / Toyman is an arms dealer and ally of the Joker.
- Dick Grayson / Robin is a former acrobat and the son of the Flying Graysons, who were murdered by Joker. Afterwards, he is hired by Batman to fight crime as Robin.
- Rory Regan / Ragman: A Jewish shopkeeper whose rag store was stolen from, Regan takes up the identity of Ragman to fight crime in Gotham. He also begins working with Batman.
- Joker is a psychopathic criminal and mass murderer who kills Robin's parents. A former clown for Haly's Circus, he became a criminal later on.

== Teen Titans: Earth One ==
=== Introduced in Volume One ===
- Victor Stone / Cyborg is a boy who was given powers as part of S.T.A.R. Lab's experiments with the metagene, led by his mother Elinore, during which he was bonded with alien metal taken from Starfire's ship. The metal creates a mecha suit around his body, which he names Rover.
- Garfield Logan / Changeling is a freshman who jumped two grades. He has a loving relationship with his two gay dads. After his powers manifest, he is able to become green versions of animals he encounters. S.T.A.R. Labs gives him the codename Changeling.
- Tara Markov / Terra is a troubled, short-tempered girl with the ability to control the earth around her. She is in a relationship with Vic. S.T.A.R. Labs gives her the codename Terra.
- Joseph Wilson / Jericho: Joey Wilson is another member of Project Titans with the ability to possess the bodies of others via eye contact. He is incredibly gifted and finds high school boring, with his father Slade remarking he is acting similarly to elitists. During a struggle with his father, Joey's throat is accidentally slit and he is forced to possess Slade's body. Having jumped between bodies, he later possesses Blackfire.
- Tempest: Tempest is among those who were experimented on by S.T.A.R. Labs. Unlike the others, he was raised in captivity, due to his fish-like appearance. He was given the ability of hydrokinesis, and can breathe underwater, but he can only survive on land for short periods without special equipment.
- Koriand'r / Starfire: Koriand'r is an alien refugee whose family escaped from an invading force. As an infant, she was found by S.T.A.R. Labs, who used her DNA to grant their test subjects superpowers.
- Raven lives on an Indian reservation with her grandfather in New Mexico, who helps her discover her powers. She experiences dreams involving the Titans, which push her to help them. After meeting the group, she lets them live with her in New Mexico.
- Slade Wilson / Deathstroke is a S.T.A.R. Labs enforcer and Joey's father.
- Elinore Stone is a S.T.A.R. Labs scientist and Victor's foster mother.
- Rita Markov is Tara's foster mother.
- Steve Dayton is Gar's foster father. Originally only dedicated to the project, he grows fond of Gar, considering him to be his son.

=== Introduced in Volume Two ===
- Niles Caulder is a leading member of S.T.A.R. Labs who intends to use the Titans to bring down the US government.
- Wally West / Impulse is a member of Caulder's Titans who possesses superhuman speed. He was raised in a S.T.A.R. Labs facility, he only knows of the outside world from Caulder, whom he considers his father.
- Kole Weathers is a member of Caulder's Titans who can create crystals. She was raised in a S.T.A.R. Labs facility and only knows of the outside world from Caulder, whom she considers her father.
- Cassie Sandsmark / Wonder Girl is a member of Caulder's Titans who has superhuman strength and durability. She was raised in a S.T.A.R. Labs facility and only knows of the outside world from Caulder, whom she considers her father.
- Joshua Clay is the chief scientist at S.T.A.R. Labs.
- Blackfire is a failed clone of Starfire created by Caulder.

== Wonder Woman: Earth One ==
=== Introduced in Volume One ===
- Princess Diana / Wonder Woman is the princess of the Amazons and the daughter of Hippolyta and Hercules, conceived out of wedlock when Hercules raped Hippolyta. Diana is loved by her sisters, but feels different from the others when she's unable to participate in many Amazon traditions due to her powers inherited from her demigod father. Nevertheless, Diana has an individual drive, one that leads her to save Steve Trevor despite becoming a criminal on Paradise Island.
- Hippolyta is the Queen of the Amazons and mother to Diana. This version is similar to her mainstream counterpart, but is depicted as less honest and more rough to her daughter. She wants protect Amazons from man's world, even willing to use brute force if necessary.
- Steve Trevor is an Air Force pilot who crash lands on Paradise Island and is saved by Diana. Unlike his DC Universe counterpart, Trevor is portrayed as African-American, a change made by writer Grant Morrison because he wanted more diversity in the comic, as well as finding it a "more potent idea to have Steve Trevor as a Black man. It's much more powerful in the context of everything that Marston was doing and everything that Wonder Woman is about".
- Beth Candy is a sorority girl and Diana's first friend in "man's world". Morrison altered Etta Candy's name to honor singer Beth Ditto, while also incorporating elements of Rebel Wilson into the character.
- Nubia is Hippolyta's advisor and second-in-command of the Amazons.
- Mala is Diana's lover and champion of the Amazons. Mala commanded the Swan Plane until Diana challenged her to a duel, eventually beating her lover and taking her plane from her.
- Althea: The chief doctor among the Amazons, Althea is keeper of the Purple Healing Ray, though Diana steals it to use on Steve Trevor.
- Troia is one of the Amazons who attempted to bring Diana back to Paradise Island.
- Artemis is another of the Amazons who attempted to bring Diana back to Paradise Island.
- The Fates are the three sisters of fate: Clotho, Lachesis, and Atropos. They were witnesses at Diana's trial.
- Aphrodite is the patron Goddess of the Amazons. She aided Hippolyta by revealing that retrieving her girdle would restore her power and allow her to slay Hercules.
- Hercules is a demigod and Diana's father.
- Medusa is the menacing gorgon who serves as a weapon for the Amazons. Hippolyta traveled to the Underworld to recruit Medusa's aid in returning her daughter back to Paradise Island for her trial. This led to Medusa turning Steve Trevor and several others into stone.
- General Darnell is Steve Trevor's superior in the air force. He and two others questioned Steve when he was returned to the United States by Diana.

=== Introduced in Volume Two ===
- Paula von Gunther, also known as Uberfraulein, is a high-ranking Nazi agent who attempted to conquer Paradise Island for Germany. After battling Hippolyta, Paula was forced into submission and joined the Amazons.
- Leon Zeiko / Doctor Psycho is a pickup artist whose skills in the field of hypnosis and neurolinguistics were required by the US Army.
- Maxwell Lord is an expert entrepreneur who provides his services to the US Army in areas such as robotics and psychology. He is later revealed to be this world's version of Ares.

=== Introduced in Volume Three ===
- General Conquest, Dr. Duke and Mr. Earl are Ares' servants.
- Professor Garrett Manly

== Green Lantern: Earth One ==
=== Introduced in Volume One ===
- Hal Jordan / Green Lantern is an asteroid miner and former astronaut who discovered a Green Lantern ring during an excavation.
- Kilowog is a scientist living on Bolovax Vik, one of the few independent planets left in explored space, at the fringes of the Manhunters' sphere of influence. He is the latest in a long line of self-proclaimed Green Lanterns and protectors of Bolovax Vik.
- Arisia Rrab is a descendant of a long-dead Green Lantern also named Arisia, and the inheritor of her ancestor's Power Ring. She is the leader of a rebel group against the Manhunters.
- Manhunters are a group of robots who were created by the Guardians of the Universe to replace the Green Lantern Corps, but betrayed and killed them. The Manhunters carved out an empire in the space previously patrolled by the Green Lanterns, centered on Oa.
- Sinestro
- Tomar-Re
- Amy Seaton
- Salaak

=== Introduced in Volume Two ===
- John Stewart
- Carol Ferris
- Ngendo Muturi
- Sophie Rivas
- Thomas Kalmaku

== See also ==
- Lists of DC Comics characters
