= Line (comics) =

Concept in western comic books

A line is a concept in Western comic books which denotes a specific group of publications by a publisher, sometimes taking place in a separate continuity or more loose continuity (such as Vertigo by DC Comics) or exploring a kind of subject matter or genre which the publisher does not want to involve in their main franchise or so called "universe".

Often lines which explore more "realistic" or "dark" subject matters are published under a companies sub imprints (such as Ultimate Marvel or MAX by Marvel Comics) to distinguish it from their main superhero lines. Sometimes a line can be published under an imprint but not always be part of a larger continuity within their imprint (such as The Punisher MAX line which is not in continuity with most other Marvel Max titles). A line can consist of several different titles, ongoing series, limited series, one-shots, annuals, specials or trades and be by many different artists but are advertised and marketed as part of the line. So called crossover events are often followed by a line of tie-in comics to the event miniseries from other unrelated titles to connect them.

Dark Horse Comics has several lines which focuses on their licensed film properties such as Alien, Predator and Star Wars. The Aliens line consists only of limited series, one-shots and graphic novels due to the publisher's wish to allow artistic freedom. Dark Horse's Star Wars line was ended in 2014 due to Disney moving their Star Wars comics to Marvel. Dark Horse also publishes a line of comics which are creator owned but are connected through common oversight by editor Karen Berger. Most companies have several simultaneously running lines.
