= List of Superman supporting characters =

This list is the cast of characters secondary to the main character of Superman in the Superman comics, television programs, cartoons, and movies. Almost all versions reference the source material of the comic book version and therefore the various iterations in all forms of media share an overlapping set of characters.

== Metropolis ==
=== Daily Planet staff ===
The staff of the Daily Planet, art by Adam Kubert and Stéphane Roux

- Kal-El/Clark Kent/Superman: As a Kryptonian hero, he's also a reporter for the Daily Planet.
- Lois Lane: An award-winning reporter and Clark Kent/Superman's primary love interest, and the character most commonly associated with Superman. Lois had traditionally been portrayed through the years as Clark's co-worker, fierce competitor, friend, love interest, fiancé, and wife.
- Jimmy Olsen: A Daily Planet photographer who often works with Lois and Clark, and has become a good friend to both. Jimmy is also known to have associated with Superman, earning him the nickname "Superman's Pal." In several stories (mostly Pre-Crisis), Jimmy has briefly acquired superhuman powers and taken on several different identities to assist Superman, the most notable and recurring of them being Elastic Lad. The character was originally created for the radio series so that Superman would have someone with whom he could talk, with Jack Grimes providing his voice in later installments.
- Perry White: The chief editor of the Daily Planet, he is noted for his trademark cigars and gruff, but caring, demeanor with his staff.
- George Taylor: The first and former editor-in-chief of the Daily Star, before the Daily Star was renamed the Daily Planet.
- Cat Grant: A gossip columnist for the Daily Planet, introduced in post-Crisis comics as a potential love interest for Clark. A divorcée and single mother, she became the focus of a tragic storyline that saw her son Adam murdered by the Toyman. Later, she worked for WGBS-TV, before becoming press secretary for President Lex Luthor. Eventually, Cat returned to the Daily Planet as the editor of the Entertainment and Arts section.
- Ron Troupe: A political editorialist for the Daily Planet, introduced in post-Crisis comics. Ron is an accomplished journalist, known for his liberal political views. He eventually marries, and has a child with, Lois's sister Lucy Lane, making him Lois's and Clark's brother-in-law, as well as their co-worker and friend.
- Steve Lombard: A blowhard sports reporter for WGBS-TV who was a recurring character and occasional romantic nemesis for Clark Kent during the mid-1970s era. Post-Crisis, Steve is the sports editor of the Daily Planet.
- Dirk Armstrong: A right-wing editorialist who wrote an opinion column for the Daily Planet. His political leanings and opinion often conflicted with those of Clark Kent, including depicting Superman as a menace and Lex Luthor a victim of the media and the political system. Armstrong would go on to work for LexCom.

=== Metropolis Police Department ===
- David Corporon: The Commissioner of the Metropolis Police Department and staunch ally of Superman has been advocating peace in Metropolis for the past several years. When promoted, at the time, he was the youngest police commissioner in the country. He considers Commissioner James Gordon of Gotham City to be an inspiration and role model to help shape his career in law enforcement.
- Captain Maggie Sawyer: Introduced in the post-Crisis comics, Sawyer was a member of Metropolis' Special Crimes Unit (SCU). An out lesbian, she was perhaps one of the first gay characters introduced in mainstream comics. She has been in a long-term relationship with a reporter named Toby Raines for several years.
- Inspector Henderson: One of Metropolis's top police officers. Introduced in the Adventures of Superman, portrayed by Robert Shayne, he was adapted into the comics in the 1980s.
- Dan Turpin: He works in the Metropolis Special Crimes Unit, and he has occasionally faced off toe-to-toe against metahuman villains. He has often been depicted as working under Maggie Sawyer.

=== Mayors of Metropolis ===
At least four mayors are known to be considered part of Metropolis' history and have interacted with Superman and his supporting characters:

- Mayor Harkness - Mayor Harkness was a mostly mentioned Mayor of Metropolis during the Bronze Age, Earth-One pre-Crisis universe.
- Mayor Frank Berkowitz - Berkowitz began his term prior to Superman's first known public meeting with Lex Luthor as depicted in the Man of Steel #4 mini-series by John Byrne. Superman was given a choice: join Luthor and received a generous check from him as first payment for his services, or arrest Luthor for the events in #4 as Berkowitz asked him to. Superman's decision made Luthor his deadliest enemy to this day. Some years later, Berkowitz was killed by a sniper hired by Luthor.
- Mayor "Buck" Sackett - "Buck" Sackett was elected as Berkowitz's successor. He was covertly Lex Luthor's "puppet".
- Mayor Fleming - Mayor Fleming is an African American female who was introduced in Nick Spencer's Jimmy Olsen back-ups. She chose Jimmy Olsen and Sebastien Mallory to show the Dalwythian-Aliens the city.

=== Organizations in Metropolis ===
- Science Police: An upgraded version of the Metropolis Special Crimes Unit led by the Guardian for a time.
- The staff of Project Cadmus would occasionally become involved in Superman's activities, especially when Darkseid established the Evil Factory and later when the Project generated an imperfect clone of Superman in Superboy. Some notable members include Paul Westfield, Dubbilex, Guardian, Heat Wave, and the Newsboy Legion.
- CAELOSS (Citizens Army for the Economic Liberation Of Suicide Slum): A group of activists who employ electronic communication and super science cybernetics and oppose Lex Luthor's control of Metropolis. During the conflict with Brainiac-13, they helped defend Metropolis.

=== Other Metropolis citizens ===
- Lex Luthor: Superman's nemesis.
- Professor Emil Hamilton: Post-Crisis, Professor Hamilton fills the role that Professor Potter did Pre-Crisis, as a S.T.A.R. Labs scientist who lends his assistance as needed to Superman.
- Bibbo Bibbowski was a fan of Superman, a dock worker in the Hob's Bay Area who was inspired by the hero to become an active force for good in Metropolis after their meeting. Bibbo would often try to come to the aid of his city and Superman, but generally acted more as comic relief. After drawing a winning lottery ticket, Bibbo buys the Ace of Clubs bar, which becomes a gathering place for various Metropolis characters.
- Colin Thornton is the publisher of Newstime magazine and was the one-time boss of Clark Kent when the reporter worked as his editor. Thornton was in actuality the civilian identity of the demon lord Satanus.
- Sam Lane: The father of Lucy and Lois Lane, Sam Lane was an army general who served as Lex Luthor's Secretary of Defense during his presidency. Believed to have died during the Imperiex conflict, Lane turned up later heading up Project 7734 leading to the destruction of New Krypton.
- Lucy Lane: Lois Lane's sister and Sam Lane's other daughter. She was Jimmy Olsen's on-and-off love interest in pre-Crisis continuity.
- Chloe Sullivan: A reporter for the Metropolis-based website Metropolitan, a post-Crisis love interest of Jimmy Olsen, and a cousin of Lois Lane. Chloe first appeared in the 2000s television series Smallville and was integrated into DC Comics canon in September 2010.
- Tana Moon: A reporter for WGBS-TV who commonly works with Kon-El (Superboy). She was introduced during the Reign of the Supermen story arc in 1993.

== Smallville residents ==
- Jonathan and Martha Kent: Superman's foster parents who adopted and raised him after he landed on Earth. They are often referred to as Ma and Pa Kent.
- Lana Lang: Clark Kent's childhood friend and sometimes love interest from Smallville. Pre-Crisis, Lana often suspected Clark of being Superboy. On several occasions, Pre-Crisis, Lana gained super-human powers from a ring she received from an alien whose life she had saved, and had several adventures as the Insect Queen. During the 1970s, Lang was also a co-worker with Clark Kent during his time as a television reporter for WGBS; post-Crisis, Clark told Lana about his powers in high school before leaving Smallville. Later, Lana married Pete Ross, and had a son named Clark. Lana was briefly First Lady of the United States, and later worked as the CEO of LexCorp. Currently, Lana and Pete are separated, and Lana lives and works in Metropolis as the business editor of the Daily Planet.
- Pete Ross: Clark Kent's childhood friend from Smallville. Pre-Crisis, Pete had accidentally discovered Clark was really Superboy, but kept the knowledge a secret from Clark. Post-Crisis, he did not learn Clark's secret until much later, and had married Lana Lang, with whom he had a son named Clark. Pete served as Vice President under Lex Luthor; following Luthor's impeachment and conviction, Ross became President of the United States for a brief time. Currently, Pete and Lana are separated, and Pete lives in Smallville with their son.
- Professor Phineas Potter: Pre-Crisis, Professor Potter was an eccentric scientist who used his talents to sometimes assist Superboy or Superman. Potter was depicted in Superboy stories as Lana Lang's maternal uncle.
- Police Chief Douglas Parker: The chief of Smallville's police department. Chief Parker mainly appeared in Silver Age Superboy stories, rarely appearing in later comics.
- Kenny Braverman: A childhood rival of Clark Kent, Braverman was poisoned from the radiation of kryptonite embedded in the infant Kal-El's space craft and afflicted with bouts of illness his entire life. He would later become the villain Conduit.
- Carl Draper a.k.a. the Master Jailer was a classmate of both Lana Lang and Clark Kent. He was in love with Lana and to get her attention, he trapped Superman who she was in love with.
- Lex Luthor: Superman's adult nemesis, in Golden Age stories (1938–59), was a rotund middle-aged (sometimes bordering on elderly) criminal scientist, with no given first name, who first met and confronted Superman as an adult in Metropolis. In Silver Age canon introduced in 1958–59, Luthor was reinvented as Lex Luthor, a brilliant teenage student roughly the same age as Clark Kent, who moved to Smallville when both were students in high school. An outstanding science student but socially awkward, Lex Luthor became friends with Clark Kent, one of the few students able to understand him on a scientific basis. In the storylines, Lex Luthor became a friend of Superboy (not suspecting, of course, that the hero was also Clark Kent). Taking note of Lex's scientific brilliance and potential to make socially beneficial discoveries, Superboy builds an advanced laboratory for Luthor to use to pursue these breakthroughs. In one storyline, Luthor is experimenting with the development of artificial biological matter when a fire breaks out in the laboratory. The fire quickly spreads and intensifies, and Superboy on his regular patrol quickly arrives to put out the fire with his super-breath. However, in the process the biological growth in Luthor's experiment is consumed in the fire, producing a caustic gas which causes all of Luthor's hair to fall out. Enraged to an irrational fury by the disaster, Luthor focuses the blame on Superboy, vowing to battle the hero the rest of his life, to the extent of killing him if possible. The Silver Age plotline of Clark Kent and Lex Luthor having been teenage friends or acquaintances has been retconned in and out several times since Crisis on Infinite Earths in 1986.

== The Superman Family ==
Clockwise from top left: the Eradicator, Steel, Superman, Supergirl, Strange Visitor, and Superboy; art by Mike McKone

- Supergirl: Pre-Crisis, Supergirl is Kara Zor-El, Superman's cousin from Argo City, a city that for a time had survived the destruction of Krypton until its residents died of kryptonite radiation. Her parents sent her to Earth, where Superman guides her in her development as a superhero. Post-Crisis, several versions of Supergirl are introduced following Kara's death. The most significant of these are Matrix and Linda Danvers, who had a complicated relationship to one another. Another such individual was Cir-El. In 2004, a new version of Kara Zor-El was introduced in issues of Superman/Batman, arriving on Earth as a teen as the original Kara did.
- Superboy: Pre-Crisis, Superboy is Superman's first costumed identity, which he assumes at age 8 and retains until he becomes Superman at age 21. In post-Crisis continuity, Superman did not become a superhero until he was an adult, erasing Superboy from continuity. The second Superboy (also known as Conner Kent and Kon-El) is a clone created by Project Cadmus and originally depicted as a metahuman with telekinesis that mimics Superman's flight and superhuman durability. A later retcon established that Superboy is a hybrid clone created from the DNA of Superman and Lex Luthor. The third Superboy is Jon Kent, the son of Superman and Lois Lane. Jon eventually took the Superman name himself, then became Tomorrow Man after an encounter with the fourth-dimensional demon Txyz, who convinced him to forge an identity separate from Superman.
- Super-Twins (Otho-Ra and Osul-Ra): Phaelosian twin refugees who came to Earth with Superman after he rescued them from Warworld. They later assume the aliases of Starchild and Red Son respectively, with Osul gaining the powers of the Fire of Olgrun, an aspect of the Old Gods.
- Krypto the Superdog: Pre-Crisis, Krypto is the El family's pet dog on Krypton, who eventually wound up on Earth and gained superpowers like Superman's. Post-Crisis, Krypto was not reintroduced until the early 2000s, but he has since been a regular supporting character in Superman comics as the companion of Superman and Superboy.
- Steel: An engineer genius named John Henry Irons who creates a high-tech, mechanized suit of armor to fight crime in, after Superman's death in The Death of Superman storyline. His niece, Natasha Irons, has also fought crime as Steel.
- Eradicator: Originally a Kryptonian device recovered by Superman, the Eradicator creates the Fortress of Solitude as part of an attempt to establish Kryptonian civilization on Earth. Later, it gains sentience and becomes a hero in its own right.
- Power Girl: A version of Kara Zor-El (Supergirl) from Earth-Two and the cousin of Superman (Kal-L).
- Lar Gand a.k.a. Mon-El: From Daxam, a planet similar to Krypton, Lar stops on Krypton just prior to its destruction. He eventually makes it to Earth and befriends Clark Kent (originally Superboy), who gives him the name Mon-El and puts him in the Phantom Zone when he is exposed to lead and begins dying from lead poisoning. Since then, Mon-El helps Superman as much as he can concerning matters with the Zone. After 1,000 years, Lar is cured and freed by the Legion of Super-Heroes, who also recruit him as a member.
- Superwoman: Several versions of a Superwoman have appeared; often she is Lois Lane, temporarily granted superpowers. Luma Lynai of Staryl bore the title. Shortly before the Crisis, Kristin Wells, a descendant of Jimmy Olsen from the future, assumed the identity of Superwoman.
- Chris Kent: Introduced in 2006, Chris Kent is the adoptive son of Clark Kent and Lois Lane and the biological son of Kryptonian supervillains General Zod and Ursa.
- Super-Man: A Chinese teenager named Kong Kenan who is a normal human imbued with the qi of Superman, giving him Kryptonian powers and making him the New Super-Man of China.
- Kal Kent: Also known as Superman 1,000,000, he is a descendant of Superman from the 853rd century.
- Natasha Irons: Natasha Irons is the niece of Steel, an extremely intelligent engineer who has begun her own superhero career. Using an advanced exo-skeleton like her uncle, she becomes the second Steel for a time, but she gained powers during 52 and has also used the names Starlight and Vaporlock. She has been a member of Team Superman and Infinity, Inc..
- Thara Ak-Var: Friend of Kara Zor-El, Thara Ak-Var was the Chief of Security on Kandor and is now Flamebird. She shared a romantic relationship with Chris Kent and later sacrificed herself to save her people by using the power of the Flamebird to return the Sun to its yellow state.
- Beppo: A Kryptonian monkey who stowed away on Kal-El's rocket.
- Comet: Supergirl's horse, who was originally a centaur before being transformed into a normal horse by the witch Circe. At various times he has had romantic feelings for Supergirl. Post-Crisis, he was given a different, stranger history.
- Streaky the Supercat: Supergirl's normal household cat, accidentally given superpowers by a new variant of Kryptonite.
- Whizzy: A 30th century descendant of Streaky the Supercat.
- Yango the Super-Ape: Pre-Crisis, a Kryptonian ape who was rocketed to Earth by anthropologist Professor An-Kal to Kenya, Africa, where he built an underground city for apes and acts as their protector.
- Ariella Kent: Ariella Kent is the Supergirl of the 853rd century. She is the daughter of the pre-Crisis Superman and Linda Danvers.
- Laurel Kent: Laurel Kent was the 30th-century direct descendant of Superman and had the power of invulnerability. She became a Legion Academy member in the hopes of joining the Legion of Super-Heroes. She first appeared in Superboy #217 (June 1976) and was created by Jim Shooter and Mike Grell.

== Allied superheroes ==
- Acrata: Acrata is a budding superhero from Mexico whose powers come from the mysterious Mayan Symbol of the Shadows.
- Agent Liberty: Former CIA operative who donned a power suit and fought crime, often beside Superman. Later acting as an operative for the United States, he would die investigating Project 7734.
- Alpha Centurion: Ancient Roman soldier and current antagonist of Superman for the affections of Lois Lane.
- Ambush Bug: Initially attempting to be a supervillain, battling Superman inspired Ambush Bug to become a superhero instead, fancying himself as Superman's sidekick/partner and close friend (much to the Man of Steel's chagrin).
- Auron: A clone of the Guardian made by Project Cadmus who abandoned the project to traverse the stars. He would be killed fighting beside Superman against Massacre.
- Batman: Bruce Wayne, who witnessed the murder of his billionaire parents as a child, swore to avenge their deaths. He trained extensively to achieve mental and physical perfection, mastering martial arts, detective skills, and criminal psychology. Costumed as a bat to prey on criminals' fears, and utilizing a high-tech arsenal, he became the legendary Batman.
- Big Barda: Bred for battle on the hellish world of Apokolips, Big Barda became one of her world's greatest warriors and served as the leader of Darkseid's personal guard, the Female Furies. Eventually Barda found love, and fled Apokolips with her future husband, Mister Miracle. Barda has since made Earth her primary home and has served as member of the Justice League.
- Black Lightning: A longtime resident of Metropolis, Black Lightning fought crime in Suicide Slum and took on the 100, making a nemesis of crime boss Tobias Whale. He would go on to be the Secretary of Education under President Lex Luthor.
- Booster Gold: Using Legion tech and operating out of Metropolis, Booster Gold started as a glory-seeking adventurer before becoming a hero and ally to Superman. Much of this cultivated into his role as Supernova, filling the void left by Superman during the year that the hero was depowered using Phantom Zone Projector technology.
- Captain Comet: A metahuman born with powers 100,000 years before his time, Adam Blake protects space as Captain Comet.
- Captain Marvel: Billy Batson, formerly known as Captain Marvel and currently known as Shazam. Deemed worthy of becoming the champion of the ancient wizard Shazam, whenever he utters the word "Shazam" young Billy Batson is struck by a magical thunderbolt and gains vast divine powers and abilities to transform into Magic's Champion, the World's Mightiest Mortal, with powers similar to Superman, but whose gods and magic-based nature makes him a valued ally to Superman, who has no comparable resistance to supernatural attacks.
- Captain Strong: The seafaring captain of the Fantasia, Strong was addicted to the alien seaweed sauncha, which Superman helped him overcome. The two became close friends, with Clark Kent occasionally joining Strong in his voyages.
- Doctor Light: After losing her powers to her villainous counterpart Arthur Light, Kimiyo Hoshi moved her family to Metropolis and came to work at S.T.A.R. Labs. When her powers are restored by Hardware, she becomes active in the Justice League and fighting crime in Metropolis.
- Draaga: The champion of Warworld who lost to Superman. Though he sought a fight to the death with Superman, he would instead become an ally and gave his life to save Earth from Brainiac.
- Gangbuster: Originally a crime fighter in Suicide Slum, he would occasionally team with Superman and one time the Kryptonian donned Gangbuster's costume when he suffered a nervous breakdown.
- Garok: Superboy's childhood friend Gary the Witch-Boy grown into a sorcerer.
- Halk Kar: Hero of the planet Thoron who once befriended Jor-El.
- Hyper-Man: Survivor of the dying planet Zoron, this infant was rocketed to Oceania where he was raised as Chester King, growing up to be Hyper-Boy and later Hyper-Man developing superhuman abilities from Oceania's lesser gravity.
- Icon: Formerly a native of the Milestone Media universe, Icon was one of many characters retconned into the mainstream DCU history following Final Crisis. Though not much is known about how they met, the two have been shown to be good friends and have a deep-seated trust in each other. Like Clark, Icon is an alien who crash-landed on Earth and was raised by a human family.
- Iman: Diego Irigoyen is a Mexican scientist who wears a hi-tech battle suit and idolizes Superman.
- Infinity, Inc.: A group of metahumans given birth from Lex Luthor's "Everyman Project", the team were his puppets until being set free by the hero Steel. Some time after earning their freedom, they would again band together as heroes in Metropolis under the direction of Steel.
- Iron Munro: Super-strong member of the Young All-Stars. Iron Munro inspired Clark Kent to become the hero known as Superman. Clark read about his adventures when he was a child, Iron Munro taught Clark the true meaning of truth, justice, and the American way.
- Kelex: In Post-Crisis stories, a Kryptonian robot who originally served Jor-El on Krypton. Kelex currently maintains Superman's Fortress of Solitude.
- Kismet: She is an immortal god in the DC Universe. She guided the Man of Steel in his path of righteousness.
- Lori Lemaris: A mermaid who Clark Kent dated while attending Metropolis University, he proposed marriage to Lori (though she turned him down). She has also been a supporting character and ally of Aquaman.
- Luma Lynai: She is a superhero of the faraway planet Staryl, and one of Supergirl's attempts to fix Superman up with a date.
- Lyla Lerrol: A pre-Crisis Kryptonian who Superman nearly married.
- Martian Manhunter: While the Martian Manhunter and Superman shared a connection as members of the Justice League and aliens on Earth with similar powers, unbeknownst to Superman J'onn had observed the hero since he was an infant. He would enter Superman's life several times, including posing as a Kent farm labourer named Josh Johnstone and his high school Civics teacher Mrs. Klingman.
- Maxima: The ruler of Almerac, she sought Superman to produce a powerful heir but would later become an ally of Superman.
- Mighty Boy: Alongside Rovo the Mighty Dog, Mighty Boy is the hero of the planet Zumoor. He and his hound have similar powers to Kryptonians.
- Mister Majestic: Displaced in Metropolis after being pulled through the Bleed, Majestic filled the void left by an absent Superman. Upon the hero's return, Majestic came to follow some of Superman's behavior before the Man of Steel was able to help Majestic return to his home universe.
- El Muerto: A Mexican superhero also known as "El Muerto", and a fan of Superman.
- Nightwing and Flamebird: Originally Superman and Jimmy Olsen, Pre-Crisis the duo would pass these identities on to Van-Zee and Ak-Var to protect Kandor. Post-Crisis, the identity would go on to several others, including Power Girl and Supergirl and recently Chris Kent and Thara Ak-Var to protect Kandor.
- Orion: The second son of Darkseid and scion of Highfather, Orion is New Genesis' greatest defender and the fiercest warrior of the Fourth World. Known as "the Dog of War", Orion constantly struggles to maintain the balance between his peaceful upbringing and his brutal nature.
- Power Boy: Zarl Vorne was rocketed from Earth to survive the destruction of Atlantis to the planet Juno where, due to having less gravity than Earth, gives the child superhuman abilities.
- Quex-Ul: Pre-Crisis, Quex-Ul was falsely imprisoned in the Phantom Zone and was freed by Superman. He would end up working for the Daily Planet as Charlie Kweeskill before being put in the Phantom Zone again alongside Superman, where he gave his life to protect the Man of Steel.
- Red Shard: Superman's unit in the Military Guild of New Krypton originally led by Asha Del-Nar, who became Superman's second-in-command.
- Scorn: The prince of Kandor who became stranded in Metropolis, becoming a hero and friend of Superman.
- Salkor: Pre-Crisis hero of the planet Makkor who married an amnesiac Supergirl.
- Sharif: Davood Nassur is a Quraci teen who developed telekinetic powers in the wake of "Invasion!". A troubled youth due to the hatred held towards his nationality that would cross swords with Superman and Lex Luthor, the teen would later act as a hero named Sinbad in Metropolis. He would later move to Los Angeles and go by the name Sharif.
- Shay Veritas: A scientific genius and consultant/confidante to Superman. Dr. Veritas created "the Block", a facility near the center of the Earth and the only place where Superman can physically train and actually see results.
- Sirocco: The embodiment of Khyber's emotions and conscience, the immortal speedster of Tehran, Iran, Sirocco will become one of the remaining survivors on Earth and ally to Superman when his evil counterpart and his Ghostwolves wipe out humanity.
- Starman: A hero of the Infinite Realm, Starman was secretly Prince Gavyn, the brother of the realm's ruler Clryssa. Gavyn was believed dead, left to die in space by order of the Imperial Council such that none challenged Clryssa's reign. Mongul would come to the realm's capitol Throneworld and slay Clryssa usurping rule, using the planet's weapon the Doomsday Device to force other worlds to join him. Starman teamed with Superman to bring Mongul to justice, leaving Gavyn to rule Throneworld. The hero would die but his essence was absorbed by Will Payton, who took up Gavyn's role.
- Strange Visitor: A childhood friend of Clark Kent's from Smallville, who gained Superman's electrical powers and wore his old containment suit from the period when he was an electrical being. She was later revealed to be the cosmic being Kismet.
- Super-Chief: Flying Stag is an Iroquois warrior who derives his powers from a talisman known as the Manitou Stone. His descendant, Jon Standing Bear, took up the mantle of Super-Chief after him, but the stone was returned to Flying Stag after his successor's death.
- Thorn: A superheroine with dissociative identity disorder who worked with Superman to battle the 100.
- Tyr-Van: A Kandorian spy for General Zod that would go on to represent the Labor Guild on New Krypton's Ruling Counsel and would be Superman's closest friend on the planet.
- Waverider: A time traveller from the Armageddon 2001 future who frequently observes Superman, occasionally involving himself with the hero.
- Wonder Man: A Superman robot named Ajax given flesh and blood by the Superman Revenge Squad to retire Superman and stand aside as they attack Earth. Ajax turned on his masters to help Superman, but died soon after via a death mechanism that had been implanted in him.
- Wonder Woman: A founding member of the Justice League, demigoddess, and Ambassador-at-Large of the Amazonian people. In her homeland, her official title is Diana, Princess of Themyscira, Daughter of Hippolyta. When blending into the society of "Man's World", she adopts her civilian identity of Diana Prince. The character is also referred to by such as the Amazing Amazon, the Spirit of Truth, Themyscira's Champion, and the Goddess of Love and War.
- Wraith: An alien who crash-landed on U.S. soil during World War II. He has been working with the U.S. Army in secrecy ever since as their own super-being, even more powerful than Superman.
- Vartox: A Pre-Crisis ally and friend to Superman from Valeron, Vartox would occasionally team with Superman to face threats on each other's planets.
- Vixen: The Vixen was introduced in an adventure of Superman, where her real name was revealed to be Mari Macabe, and where she was revealed to be one of Clark Kent's and Lois Lane's fellow Daily Planet reporters. She possesses an amulet, the "Tantu Totem," that will allow her to hold any powers of any animal she chooses. As the Tantu Totem is magical in nature, she was able (when she and Superman briefly fought) to harm Superman, since, being a scientific creature, he is vulnerable to magic.
- Yellow Peri: A sorceress who assisted Superman during his Superboy and adult heroic career.

== Allied superhero teams ==
- Forgotten Heroes: A group of heroes who formed to save Superman's life and later teamed with Superman to battle the Forgotten Villains. During these adventures, the group was composed of Immortal Man, Cave Carson, Dane Dorrance, Rip Hunter, Congo Bill/Congorilla, Animal Man, Dolphin, and Rick Flag Jr.
- Justice League of America: A team of superheroes of which Superman is a member and often the leader. Other notable JLA members include Batman, Wonder Woman, the Flash, Green Lantern, Aquaman, the Martian Manhunter, the Green Arrow and the Black Canary.
- Legion of Super-Heroes: A team of young superheroes from the 30th and 31st centuries who were formed with Superman as their inspiration. In his youth, Superman frequently traveled to the future to serve as a member of the Legion as Superboy. Other notable Legionnaires include Cosmic Boy, Saturn Girl, Lightning Lad, Brainiac 5, Mon-El, and Supergirl.
- Teen Titans: A team of teenaged superheroes. Superman's teenaged clone Superboy frequently appeared as a member of the team.
- New Gods: As Earth seemed inexplicably tied to the Anti-Life Equation, sought by Darkseid and his minions, Superman would become a frequent opponent to the ruler of Apokolips and thus an ally to his enemies in the New Gods of Supertown. Some notable members of these New Gods are Highfather, Orion, Mister Miracle, Big Barda, and the Forever People.
- Squad K: A government sponsored unit created to take down Superman should he ever go rogue. With the appearance of New Krypton, they became a unit charged with taking on Kryptonian threats. When they were introduced, they were led by Colonel Perseus Hazard, the grandson of Gravedigger. The team was forced to add Reactron to the group and he killed them during their mission together. The team was reformed under General Lane led by Sergeant Cloud.
- Supermen of America: A team of youths inspired by Superman initially funded by LexCorp to protect Metropolis.
- Metahuman Metropolis Special Crimes Unit: To face the growing threat of metahuman crime in Metropolis, the S.C.U. added metahuman agents: Freight-Train, Fireworks, Badmouth, and the Roo.
- Space Canine Patrol Agents: An intergalactic group of canine crime fighters.
- Space Cat Patrol Agents: A feline version of the Space Canine Patrol Agents.
- Superman Emergency Squad: A group of Kandorians led by Superman's cousin Don-El who come to Superman's aid whenever necessary.
- Hyper-Family: A family of heroes on the planet Trombus who gain powers similar to Kryptonians under a red sun. The group includes Hyperman, Hyperwoman and Klypso the Hyperdog and is led by Hyperboy.

== See also ==
- The Superman Family
- List of Smallville characters
- List of Batman supporting characters
- List of Wonder Woman supporting characters
- List of Aquaman supporting characters
- List of Green Lantern supporting characters
- List of Green Arrow supporting characters
