= For the Man Who Has Everything =

Comic book story by Alan Moore and Dave Gibbons

- Cover of Superman Annual #11 (1985); art by Dave Gibbons
- Publisher: DC Comics
- Publication date: 1985
- Genre: Superhero
- Title(s): Superman Annual #11
- Main character(s): Superman; Mongul; Wonder Woman; Batman; Robin; Jor-El

Creative team
- Writer: Alan Moore
- Artist: Dave Gibbons
- Letterer: Dave Gibbons
- Colorist: Tom Ziuko
- Editor: Julius Schwartz
- DC Universe: The Stories of Alan Moore: ISBN 1-4012-0927-0

"For the Man Who Has Everything" is a comic book story by writer Alan Moore and artist Dave Gibbons, first published in Superman Annual #11 (1985). It contains the first appearance of the Black Mercy, a magical, extraterrestrial, plant-like organism which, upon symbiotically attaching itself to its victims, incapacitates them while causing them to hallucinate living out their greatest fantasy.

Nominated for the 1986 Kirby Award for Best Single Issue, "For the Man Who Has Everything" is widely regarded as one of the best Superman stories of all time. As such, it has been adapted for television, most notably the episode of the same name of the animated TV series Justice League Unlimited. It was more loosely adapted into an episode of The CW's live-action Supergirl TV series titled "For the Girl Who Has Everything", and served as inspirations for the episode of Syfy live-action Krypton TV series titled "Mercy" and for two episodes of the second season of Adult Swim's animated My Adventures with Superman.

== Background and context ==
Between 1980 and 1984, Alan Moore became a recurring presence in comic books published in the United Kingdom. The British division of Marvel Comics, IPC Magazines (publisher of the comic 2000 AD), and Quality Communications (publisher of the comic Warrior) all hired Moore to write for them. On more than one occasion Moore worked on comics with artist Dave Gibbons and the two enjoyed working together.

Gibbons' talent caught the attention of DC Comics in 1982. That year, Len Wein hired him as the artist of the Green Lantern series.

The following year Moore was also hired by Wein who had been seeking a writer for Swamp Thing due to the low sales the title had seen. Alan Moore reinvented the character and introduced new themes, dealing with social and environmental issues. Moore took over the series in 1984 and his scripts soon attracted the attention of audiences and critics.

Both before and while working on Swamp Thing, Moore submitted numerous proposals to the publisher, seeking to work with characters like the Martian Manhunter and the Challengers of the Unknown, but all ended up being rejected because DC had already developed projects with other writers for the characters with which he intended to work. When editor Dick Giordano approved the project that would become Watchmen, Moore and Gibbons began working on planning the stories. Shortly after, editor Julius Schwartz asked Gibbons if he could draw a Superman story. Gibbons said he was available. When Schwartz told Gibbons he could also choose who wrote the story, he immediately requested Moore. "For the Man Who Has Everything" began to take shape.

== Plot ==
Batman, Robin, and Wonder Woman visit the Fortress of Solitude with gifts on Superman's birthday, February 29, but they find him catatonic, with an alien plant wrapped around his body. The alien conqueror Mongul reveals himself, explaining that the plant – called the "Black Mercy" – has incapacitated Superman while it consumes his bio-aura, feeding him a realistic dream based on his heart's deepest desire. In his catatonic state, Superman dreams of a normal life on his long-destroyed home planet of Krypton, happily married to Lyla Lerrol and with two children, Orna and Van-El.

While Wonder Woman battles the more powerful Mongul at her own risk, Batman and Robin try to free Superman by prying the Black Mercy off of him. Superman's fantasy takes a dark turn as his father Jor-El, whose prediction of Krypton's doom was unfulfilled, has become discredited and embittered. Superman's mother Lara has died from the "Eating Sickness", further isolating Jor-El from his family. Even the death of his brother Zor-El has not reconciled Jor-El to his sister-in-law Alura and niece Kara Zor-El.

Kryptonian society has undergone political upheaval, and the disgraced Jor-El has become chairman of an extremist movement "the Sword of Rao", calling for a return to Krypton's "noble and unspoiled" past through the establishment of a totalitarian theocracy under the leadership of Brother Lor-Em.

The Phantom Zone, Krypton's other-dimensional prison system developed by Jor-El, has become unpopular with the public. Kara Zor-El is assaulted by anti-Zone protesters, for whom the criminal Jax-Ur, sentenced to eternity in the Zone, is a martyr. Kal-El decides to take his family away from the city for protection, only to witness Jor-El presiding over a political demonstration reminiscent of a Fascist rally, which dissolves into a riot between anti-Zone protesters and the Sword of Rao.

Superman gradually wakes from his dream, but not before tearfully saying goodbye to his "son" Van-El away at the Kandor crater. Batman pries the Mercy from Superman's chest, and the plant latches on to him instead, submerging Batman in his own dream, in which his parents’ murder is prevented when Thomas Wayne disarms Joe Chill. Superman awakens, enraged by the Mercy's action, and attacks Mongul before he can kill Wonder Woman. They battle across the Fortress, causing massive damage.

Robin uses Mongul's discarded gauntlets to pry the Mercy off Batman, stuffing the plant inside a gauntlet to carry it safely toward the battle. Subduing Mongul, Superman is distracted by the sight of the statues of his parents, and Mongul gains the upper hand, but Robin drops the Mercy on him. Seized by the plant, Mongul is submerged in his own fantasy, in which he swats the Mercy aside, kills the heroes and goes on to conquer Earth and the universe.

Tending to their wounds, Batman mentions to Wonder Woman that his fantasy included him marrying Kathy Kane and having a teenage daughter, while Wonder Woman confesses envy that she did not find out her heart's desire. Planning to imprison Mongul in a black hole across the galaxy, Superman unwraps his gifts. Wonder Woman brought a replica of Kandor made by the "gem-smiths" of Paradise Island, prompting Superman to hide his own replica of the Bottle City at super-speed. Batman's gift turns out to be another plant – a new breed of rose named "The Krypton" – which was stepped on during the fight. Musing that it is perhaps for the best, Superman asks that someone make coffee while he cleans up the Fortress. Deep in his fantasy of total final victory, Mongul is content.

== Collected editions ==
As well as appearing in Superman Annual #11 it has been reprinted in:

- The Greatest Superman Stories Ever Told – hardcover compilation, 1987, DC Comics, ISBN 0-930289-29-3; and trade paperback edition, 1989, DC Comics, ISBN 0-930289-39-0
- Superman: The Man of Tomorrow – trade paperback, 1988, Titan Books, ISBN 1-85286-049-9 (in black and white only)
- Across the Universe: The DC Universe Stories of Alan Moore – trade paperback, 2003, DC Comics, ISBN 1-4012-0087-7
- DC Universe: The Stories of Alan Moore – trade paperback, 2006 (Titan ISBN 1-84576-257-6, DC Comics ISBN 1-4012-0927-0)
- Superman: A Celebration of 75 Years – hardcover compilation, 2014, DC Comics, ISBN 978-1-4012-4704-1
- Superman by Alan Moore Absolute Edition – oversized hardcover compilation, 2027, DC Comics, ISBN 978-1-7995-1404-6

== Adaptations ==
=== Justice League Unlimited (2004) ===
The story was adapted for the second episode of the animated series Justice League Unlimited. In this version, Robin does not appear and most of his lines and actions are given to Wonder Woman, while some details such as the protective gauntlets are removed, and many other details are altered. Batman simply brings money as his present while Wonder Woman brings the new Krypton rose. While Mongul surmises in the comic that Superman's fantasy may involve "the aboriginal backwater he grew up in" (i.e., Smallville), in the episode he speculates that the Mercy's world involves Superman controlling the universe. Lyla Lerrol, Kal-El's wife in Superman's fantasy, is renamed Loana and is an amalgam of Lois Lane and Lana Lang, the two main loves of Clark Kent's life.

J. M. DeMatteis adapted the script from the Alan Moore/Dave Gibbons story. According to Dwayne McDuffie, Alan Moore liked the episode (a rarity, as he is known for disavowing most adaptations of his works) and both Moore as well as Gibbons are given credit at the beginning of the episode (another rarity, as Moore often refuses to be credited in adaptations of his work).

In 2006, Mattel released a Justice League Superman action figure which included a Black Mercy accessory.

=== Supergirl (2016) ===
The thirteenth episode of the first season of Supergirl TV series adapts "For the Man Who Has Everything", with the title changed to "For the Girl Who Has Everything", reflecting its being centered on Superman's cousin Kara Danvers. In the episode, Kara falls under the influence of the Black Mercy and imagines herself back on Krypton. She is eventually rescued via outside intervention by her adopted sister Alex Danvers.

=== My Adventures with Superman (2024) ===
"For the Man Who Has Everything" serves as an inspiration for the second season of the animated My Adventures with Superman. In the episode "The Death of Clark Kent", Brainiac captures Superman and uses the Black Mercy on him. Unlike in the source material, the Black Mercy is depicted as virtual reality technology and facilitates Brainiac's attempt to supplant Superman's consciousness and take over his body by trapping his mind in a fantasy version of Krypton. He is eventually released by Lois Lane after she uses the Black Mercy on herself.
