= Porm =

Porm may refer to:

- Porm, a character appearing in Aquaman comic books
- Lake Porm, a lake in New Zealand
- Porm, an intentional misspelling of porn
- PORM, a variant of Plus–minus sign
