= World's Finest Team =

DC Comics superhero team

The World's Finest Team

Publication information
- Publisher: DC Comics
- First appearance: (Dollar Comics); World's Finest Comics #244 (May 1977) (As a team); World's Finest Comics #250 (May 1978)
- Created by: Gerry Conway (writer); Jim Aparo (artist)

In-story information
- Member(s): Superman; Batman; Wonder Woman; Green Arrow; Black Canary

The World's Finest Team is a DC Comics superhero team who first appeared in the DC Comics Dollar Comics format series in World's Finest Comics #244 (May 1977), created by Gerry Conway, with art by Jim Aparo and George Tuska. The team consists of the Silver Age versions of Superman, Batman, Green Arrow, and Black Canary, along with the new, original Wonder Woman of Earth-Two.

Prior to the events of Infinite Crisis, Matt Wagner re-invented the origin of the first meeting between Batman, Superman, and Wonder Woman in the DC Comics limited series Trinity in 2003. Combined, these three heroes are the "trinity" of the World's Finest Team (also referred to as the World's Finest Trinity). The story takes place before the formation of the Justice League.

== Dollar Comic format ==
In 1978, World's Finest Comics was among the few to be distributed as a "Dollar Comic". Jenette Kahn, the president and publisher of DC Comics at the time, wrote in a 1977 letter column that in the Golden Age of Comic Books there were 64-page comics that sold for 10 cents. Over time, the comics reduced the number of pages to 32 for the same price. Eventually, the 32-page comics raised in price from 12 cents to 15, to 20, to 25, and then to 30. As predicted, Kahn said in the future the prices would raise again due to inflation and the cost of living. The decision to introduce 80 pages of story at one dollar was to relive those glory days, and feature more all-new stories and art, by combining four comics for the price of three. This was exemplified by having the World’s Finest Comics series feature the finest DC Comics characters.

== Publication history ==
Beginning with issue #244, World's Finest Comics introduced a one-page blurb: "To a select few, the word super-hero is aptly applied, a few fantastic individuals have attained worldwide fame as heroes beyond all imaginings, persons such as Superman, Batman, Wonder Woman, Green Arrow and Black Canary, separately, they are among the finest, but here, together, they are the World's Finest."

In World's Finest Comics #250, the World's Finest Team were officially united: "For the first time in history Superman, the Batman, Green Arrow and the Black Canary join forces with the new, original Wonder Woman in the cataclysmic epic that could only appear here, in the star-studded pages of the 250th issue of World's Finest Comics. Join these mighty champions of justice as they pit their fantastic powers against the cunning of Agent Axis and The Ravager of Time in a desperate mission to save reality."

A rotating guest hero was added to the World's Finest roster, but not officially as a team member. These heroes included the Vigilante (issues #244–248), the Creeper (issues #249–252) and the Wonder Woman of Earth-One (issues #251–252). The last official 80-page Dollar Comic of World's Finest Comics was issue #252, after which the page count dropped to 64 pages, as Kahn predicted. The new format had no ads and the Wonder Woman feature moved to Adventure Comics (starting with issue #459) to help launch that series' new Dollar Comic format similar to World's Finest Comics. The entire run with the World's Finest Team was from World's Finest Comics #244-252.

Specific entries of the current versions of these heroes can be found in their individual entries. Notably, the current Wonder Woman of Earth-Two is not the same character as the Earth-Two Wonder Woman in the World's Finest Team. This version of Wonder Woman is a hybrid of the Golden Age Wonder Woman and the 1975–1979 television series Wonder Woman. Characters who appeared in these Wonder Woman stories, such as General Blankenship, Suzy and a dark-haired Steve Trevor, are based on their TV versions.

== Synopsis ==
After completing an outer space emergency mission, Superman and Batman return to Earth and encounter the Ravager of Time, who manipulates time by bringing World War II into the present. Discovering that the Justice League no longer exist, Superman and Batman search the civilian identities of each hero in hope of finding answers. Batman discovers that in this revised time period, the heroes never gained their powers and abilities.

Desperately, Superman and Batman search everywhere, eventually arriving at Paradise Island and encountering Princess Diana, who never became Wonder Woman. The heroes explain the situation and Diana believes them. She explains that as immortals, the Amazons understand the flow of time in a way inexplicable to man, and escorts them to her mother, Queen Hippolyte.

Hippolyte uses the magic sphere of Athena to visually explain that time has broken due to the appearance of the Ravager, a being that can transport back and forth through time like a pendulum, merging past and present, and eventually causing all reality to cease to exist. Hippolyte explains that the heroes will need to go back in time to August 13, 1942, to prevent the threat caused by four people: the Ravager, the man who can disrupt time; Wonder Woman, an Amazon who is (and is not) her daughter, Diana; and the true crux of the disaster, Green Arrow and the Black Canary. Even though Superman and Batman managed to remember most of the Justice League members including Wonder Woman, they did not remember the existence of Green Arrow or Black Canary. Superman used his time travel abilities to transport the two heroes.

Before all this occurred, Black Canary confided in Green Arrow her feelings to mourn after the death of her husband, Larry. She explained that she desired to return to Earth-Two, her birthplace, to adjust, among her friends and places she misses. Green Arrow supported her decision and they both journeyed to the Justice League Headquarters to use the Transmatter Machine, the device used to travel from Earth-One to Earth-Two. Hawkman, who was on monitor duty, explained that the device was unstable due to a battle with Professor Phineas Potter and needed to be repaired. Green Arrow ignored the warnings and used the machine to transport himself and Black Canary to Earth-Two. The machine then malfunctioned, causing all heroes nearest to it to lose their powers as if they never existed, returning them to their civilian life. Only four heroes escaped the fate: Green Arrow and Black Canary, and Superman and Batman, who were in outer space at the time.

Green Arrow and Black Canary noticed that the journey to Earth-Two was taking longer than normal. On Earth-Two in 1942, Wonder Woman, flying in her invisible plane, suddenly flew into a rift in the sky, causing a collision with Green Arrow and Black Canary in which the three were propelled into the void and emerged on Earth-One during World War II on August 13, 1942. Analyzing the situation, the heroes questioned how to return to their proper times and places, but were interrupted by army officials.

=== Birth of the Ravager ===
Nazis have been after Professor Mark Ronsom, who had invented a chronal transponder, to use the device to attack the Germans and Japanese in the past to prevent World War II. A Nazi agent, Agent Axis, manages to shoot down Professor Ronsom. Dying, he asks Wonder Woman to use the device on his body to place him into a time stasis to save his life. She does so, but instead Professor Ronsom becomes the Ravager and attacks the army officers and burns the Lincoln Memorial nearby. Wonder Woman lassos the Ravager, but he disappears.

Reports of the Ravager appearing and causing destruction all over the country are noted in news reports. Superman and Batman arrive from the future and offer their help. Batman explains that the Ravager is damaging all time by bringing a chunk of the previous era with him like a pendulum swing from 1942 to 1978. The task seems hopeless as the Library of Congress is attacked, but the World's Finest Team intercepts. Superman uses his strength to subdue the Ravager, but upon contact ages to an old man, weakened for a few minutes. Wonder Woman, who is immune to the ravages of age, finds that her strength causes the creature no pain. Green Arrow unleashes a blast arrow, which does nothing. Agent Axis emerges from behind the scenes and, using an electro-magnetic neutralizer harness, subdues the Ravager, but both disappear.

The World's Finest Team travels to a Nazi Headquarters in Bavaria to encounter Agent Axis. During the battle, Agent Axis tries to destroy the chronal transponder in fear that the device would be used against the Nazi forces. During the course of the action, time stops and the small group of people, including the World's Finest Team, are in the center of the chronal explosion. Superman identifies that the belt needs to be activated two inches from the Ravager's body to start the flow of time. Green Arrow times the device in 10 seconds and succeeds. Reality is restored and the heroes are returned to their proper times and places, with no memory of the entire ordeal. Only Queen Hippolyte, Green Arrow, and Black Canary retained knowledge about the Reality War.

== List of character appearances ==
=== Heroes ===
- Superman (Kal-El, Clark Kent)
- Batman (Bruce Wayne)
- Wonder Woman (Princess Diana, Diana Prince)
- Green Arrow (Oliver Queen)
- Black Canary (Dinah Lance)

=== Guest stars ===
- Vigilante (Greg Saunders)
- Creeper (Jack Ryder)
- Wonder Woman (Earth-One)
- Hawkman (Katar Hol)
- Hawkgirl (Shayera Hol)
- Martian Manhunter (J'onn J'onzz)
- General Blankenship
- Steve Trevor
- Suzy
- Yeoman Smith
- Justice League
- Flash (Barry Allen)
- Aquaman (Arthur Curry)
- Ram Drood
- Stuff
- Stuff, Jr.
- Atom (Ray Palmer)
- Mademoiselle Marie
- Sgt. Rock
- Phantom Stranger
- Krell
- Alfred Pennyworth
- Superman (Earth-Two)
- Speedy
- Steve Howard
- Supergirl (Kara Danvers)

=== Villains ===
- The Rainbow Archer
- The Mad Bombardier
- Ludwig von Schmeer
- Baltaz
- The Man-Bear
- The Falcon
- The Iron Claw
- Kor-El
- Wulf
- The Dummy
- Baron Blitzkrieg
- The Parasite
- The Lurkers
- The Hellgrammite
- Doctor Psycho
- Monster Abe Keeler
- The Ravager (Professor Ronsom)
- Professor Potter
- Agent Axis
- Mr. Devlin
- Count Vertigo
- Boss Dyke
- The Disrupter
- Poison Ivy
- The Whisperer
- The Stinger
