= Auron =

Auron may refer to:

- Auron (character), two fictional DC Comics superheroes
- Auron (ski resort)
- Auron (river) in central France, a tributary of the Yèvre
- Auron, a playable character in the Square role-playing game Final Fantasy X
- One of the 12 archetypal Orthogons, also known as a Golden Rectangle
- Auron (later AuRon), the main character in Dragon Champion, the first book in E. E. Knight's Age of Fire series
- AuronPlay, a Spanish YouTuber

== See also ==
- Aurone, a class of chemical compounds
- Aaron (disambiguation)
