= Lori Lemaris =

- Lori Lemaris's first appearance in Superman #129 (May 1959), art by Wayne Boring.

Publication information
- Publisher: DC Comics
- First appearance: Superman #129 (May 1959)
- Created by: Bill Finger; Wayne Boring

In-story information
- Species: Mermaid
- Place of origin: Atlantis
- Team affiliations: Justice League of Atlantis
- Supporting character of: Superman; Aquaman
- Abilities: Semi-amphibious physiology allows her to breathe on land for a period of time as well as morph her tail into a pair of human legs. Can swim at high velocities and exhibits strength and durability sufficient to survive the deep sea. Can communicate telepathically with marine life.

Lori Lemaris is a mermaid in DC Comics, and a romantic interest for Superman. She is from Tritonis, a city in the undersea lost continent of Atlantis, and first appeared in Superman #129. She was created by Bill Finger and Wayne Boring. Lori is one of several Superman characters with the alliterative initials "LL", including Lois Lane, Lex Luthor, Lana Lang, Lyla Lerrol, Luma Lynai, and Lucy Lane.

== Fictional character biography ==
=== Silver Age ===
Lori was first introduced in the story "The Girl in Superman's Past" in Superman #129 (May 1959). While attending Metropolis University, Clark Kent meets Lori, who is attending as a student and hides her mermaid identity by posing as a wheelchair-using student with a blanket covering her lower body. Clark and Lori soon fall in love with each other, but Clark starts to wonder why Lori cuts their dates short every night to return home at 8 PM. Clark eventually decides to propose marriage to Lori, but Lori tells Clark that she cannot marry him and is returning home. Heartbroken and growing suspicious of why Lori had to return home every night at a preset time, Clark investigates and discovers that Lori is a mermaid after seeing the tank of water in her room. Lori, in turn, reveals that she learned Clark's identity as Superman using her telepathy, but promises to keep her knowledge secret. Lori also states that since the two come from different worlds, they can never marry. After a parting kiss underwater, the two bid farewell to each other.

Lori made various appearances throughout the Silver Age Superman comics before being killed during Crisis on Infinite Earths.

=== Modern Age ===
Lori returns following John Byrne's 1986 Man of Steel limited series, which revised Superman's origins. Her post-Crisis incarnation first appeared in Superman (vol. 2) #12 in December 1987. Her origin and relationship with Clark remained similar to the original, except that in post-Crisis continuity, Clark never operated as Superboy.

In Lori's appearances in the 1990s, she was magically altered so that she would be human when dry and a mermaid when wet. Lois Lane agrees to let her stay at her apartment during a trip to Metropolis; however, Lori being an old flame of Clark's puts a brief strain on Lois and Clark's relationship, though things are soon straightened out. Lori remains a recurring character through the rest of the 1990s. At one point she is accused of being a black market smuggler of underground artifacts and is confronted by Daily Planet reporter Steve Lombard and a camera crew. To escape, she dives off a bridge and swims away. Not understanding her nature, Lombard and his crew believe Lori to have committed suicide.

In the series Aquaman (2025), Lori Lemaris reappears as a mercenary and servant of Dagon.

== Other versions ==
- An alternate universe version of Lori Lemaris appears in the Tangent Comics series Joker's Wild. This version is a human who operates as a heroic version of Joker.
- An alternate universe version of Lori Lemaris appears in Superman: Year One.

== In other media ==
- Lori Lemaris appears in Young Justice, voiced by Kath Soucie. This version is a sorcerer, general, and representative of the Atlantean city-state of Tritonis.
- Lori Lemaris appears as a character summon in Scribblenauts Unmasked: A DC Comics Adventure.
