= Superman: The Third Kryptonian =

"The Third Kryptonian"
- Cover of Superman vol. 3, 668 (December 2007), art by Renato Guedes
- Publisher: DC Comics
- Publication date: December 2007 – January 2008
- Genre: Superhero
- Title(s): Superman #668–670
- Main character(s): Superman; Batman; Robin; Chris Kent

Creative team
- Writer: Kurt Busiek
- Artist: Rick Leonardi

"The Third Kryptonian" is a three-issue Superman comic book story arc written by Kurt Busiek with art by Rick Leonardi.

The story arc appears in Superman #668–670, and is rooted in a three-part story arc that was released between "Superman: Up, Up and Away!" and "Last Son" called "Back in Action", in which a villain named the Auctioneer captures people as trophies until Superman and an alliance of heroes and villains unites to stop him. The Auctioneer discloses that he came looking for the "third Kryptonian", a comment that confuses Superman. Although the third Kryptonian may have been Chris Kent, this was revealed not to be the case.

The story in Superman #670 was slated to appear in the Superman Annual #13.

== Plot ==
=== Part 1 ===
Battling the Dominators, Superman spots Chris Kent, who should be in school. Chris tells him of his troubles in school, and Superman takes Chris to the Batcave to meet Batman and Robin. Upon learning that red sun radiation shuts off his powers, Superman asks Batman to make a projector small enough to be put in a watch for Chris.

Chris is excited to see Robin, an ordinary human being, performing stunts. Receiving news of a bridge collapse, Batman mobilizes Superman and Chris, who save the people and repair the bridge. Batman alerts Superman to a group of rampaging kids with superhuman strength. Superman and Batman discover that the kids had inhaled an alien compound through smoking, thinking they might lead him to the third Kryptonian. Meanwhile, an alien race, led by the mysterious Amalak, watches Superman, and learns of the Kryptonians living on Earth. Amalak also learns of the existence of Kandor.

Superman goes to the place that supposedly produced the compound, discovering that it is house whose only inhabitant is a woman called Kristin Wells.

=== Part 2 ===
Superman comes upon Kristin Wells, noting her exotic garden. He starts to politely introduce himself, and she punches him to Tokyo. Superman returns to find Wells armed with a gun, threatening him. He says he's there to talk, and she stands down.

She says that her real name is Karsta Wor-Ul and that she was a soldier under Admiral Dru-Zod until, generations ago, the Kryptonian government decided to shut down the Kryptonian empire. Refusing to yield, she and others fled.

They were pursued by Almerac agents and the group split and fractured, some returning to Krypton, others going rogue. She eventually met Ro-Kul, fell in love, and perpetrated acts of piracy and events that included her killing other beings to survive.

She recalls that in sojourn with Ro, she had dreams of Kandor, a proposed lunar colony. Later, on another planet, they are attacked by Amalak, a mysterious being that swore vengeance on all Kryptonians. Amalak killed Ro, and Karsta fled to Earth to use Superman as an early warning system, should Amalak return.

After finishing her story, Karsta prepares to leave, but Superman tries to talk her out of it. However, Amalak discovers their location and attacks them.

=== Part 3 ===
Superman fights Amalak, while Power Girl, Supergirl and Krypto fight Amalak's minions across the world. While Superman fights Amalak, Karsta decides to escape. Batman hears everything through audio gear and decides to help. Superman meanwhile ricochets a beam of heat vision off a satellite to signal Lois to hide out somewhere with Chris before Amalak is able to track them too. Chris asks if he can remove his watch and join in the action but his foster mother reminds him not to disobey Superman. Karsta, meanwhile, retrieves an escape craft from the ocean and flies off the planet. Karsta then finds an abandoned Kryptonian space cruiser.

Amalak attacks Superman with red-solar explosives and Kryptonite flechettes. Superman goes to the Fortress to protect Kandor. Superman reaches the Fortress in the Amazon, but he is ambushed by Amalak's forces. Amalak activates the Brain Ripper, a device capable of ripping memories from one brain to implant them into another. Amalak plans to use the Brain Ripper to obtain Kandor's location from Superman's mind, but Superman manages to resist the process and use the Brain Ripper to read Amalak's mind instead. Seeing Amalak's memories, Superman discovers that Amalak's planet was conquered by Admiral Zod in the name of the Kryptonian empire. When Amalak returned home, the souls of the dead told him who was responsible. Enraged, Amalak swore vengeance on all Kryptonians.

After the link between Superman and Amalak is severed, Power Girl, Supergirl and Krypto rescue Superman. While Superman and his allies fight Amalak's forces, Amalak goes to the Arctic Fortress. There, Amalak fights Batman, who is using a powered suit of armor, but Amalak easily defeats him. Superman and his allies arrive to the Fortress after defeating Amalak's allies, and realize that Amalak has found Kandor. Amalak then realizes that the Kandor he found is not the Kandor he remembers. Superman and his friends try to reason with Amalak, but Amalak furiously shatters the city. The Kryptonians fight Amalak, while Batman remotely deactivates Chris's red-sun watch, granting him access to his powers. Chris dutifully goes to help his father.

Amalak defeats Supergirl and Power Girl, and attacks Superman, reminding him that he is powered by the dead souls of Rinoti. Chris appears and defends his father. Amalak senses that Chris is a descendant of Admiral Zod and tries to kill him. Superman uses the last of his strength to throw Amalak to the edge of the Atomic Cauldron, power source of the Fortress. While Superman and Amalak teeter on the edge, Power Girl and Supergirl try to activate a Phantom Zone projector.

Suddenly, Karsta appears and activates yellow sun grenades that restore the Kryptonians's powers. Together, the Kryptonians defeat Amalak and trap him in steel.

Karsta chooses to deliver Amalak and his henchmen to the space authorities, and also turn herself in for her own crimes. Superman bids her farewell and hopes they might meet again now that she is reformed. He is also happy he has been able to see Krypton from another perspective and wonders if he'll ever be able to save Tolos' now lost city of Kandor.

He also wonders, if Amalak is right about the existence of a real Kryptonian city full of other survivors, and whether a new generation of Kryptonians might be out there.
