= List of Aquaman supporting characters =

This is a list of supporting characters of Aquaman.

== Supporting characters ==
Aquaman's companions over the years have included:

- Andrina Curry: The daughter of Aquaman and Mera. She is the Princess of Atlantis and inherits the powers of both of her parents
- Aquababy: Son of Aquaman and Mera, Arthur Curry, Jr.; he inherited Mera's water-controlling powers while having the unique ability to create and mutate sea life. He was a young child when killed by Black Manta.
- Aqualad (Kaldur'ahm): The son of Black Manta, who was raised on the surface world before learning of his heritage and becoming a superhero.
- Arthur Joseph Curry: Orin's successor as Aquaman.
- Atlanna: A member of the Atlantean Royal Family and the mother of Aquaman, formerly the Queen of Atlantis. She conceived her child with the human lighthouse keeper Thomas Curry.
- Cal Durham: An African American hero who befriended Aquaman. He once served as Black Manta's lieutenant and was given the ability to breathe underwater.
- Cerdian: The infant son of Dolphin and Tempest (Garth).
- Cetea: The Reverend Mother of the Widowhood of Atlantis.
- Dane Dorrance: Leader of the Sea Devils, a team of underwater adventurers.
- Deep Blue: Aquaman's half-sister, also known as Indigo. Debbie Perkins was thought to be the daughter of Neptune Perkins and Tsunami, but Atlan (Orin's father) was revealed to be her true father, meaning that she is Orin's half-sister. She cannot live out of the water. She can control sea life if she touches it and can even change the size of sea creatures once she touches them.
- Dolphin: An amnesiac with alien-enhanced Atlantean-like physiology who was briefly Aquaman's love interest.
- Elsa Magnusson: The widow of Mark Merlin and an accomplished sorceress.
- Erika Watson: An officer of the Amnesty Bay Police Department, who used to go to school with Arthur Curry before he became Aquaman.
- Garth: An outcast orphan from the Atlantean colony of the Idyllists whom Aquaman took in and who became for a time Aquaman's crimefighting partner and a member of the Teen Titans as Aqualad. He currently goes by the name Tempest.
- Hila: Mera's twin sister; even Aquaman cannot tell them apart. Hila is married to Kandor, a former criminal. She is less responsible than Mera and a little more wild. Current whereabouts unknown.
- Iqula: The King of Tritonis, sister city to Poseidonis, which is populated by merpeople.
- Jim Lockhart: Golden Age hero formerly known as the Red Torpedo.
- Jurok Byss: The Keeper of the Monsters, a position in Atlantis' military structure.
- King Shark: Former enemy of Aquaman. Only living son of the King of All Sharks, also known as the Shark God.
- Koryak: Aquaman's illegitimate son by Kako, an Inupiaq woman. Koryak, who possessed powers similar to Aquaman's, plotted with Vulko to take over Atlantis and was exiled, but was pardoned after the events of the Obsidian Age storyline. He died during an attack by the Spectre. Later it was revealed his tomb was empty, prompting the belief that he may have survived the Spectre's attack on Atlantis and may still be alive somewhere roaming the depths of the ocean in an injured or perhaps even an amnesiac state. Before his character was assumed to be killed he made a point on the lack of other ethnicities in Atlantis as a result of the influx of different newcomers from Sub-Diego.
- Lagoon Boy: A green-skinned aquatic teen and member of Young Justice.
- Leot: An Atlantean Elder who was skeptical of Aquaman and helped put Rath on the throne. Died unceremoniously when the poor choice for monarchy became corrupted by his abuse of magic and slaughtered the council.
- Letifos: Member of a race of shark-finned merfolk called the Sher'Hedeen. Assisted Tempest through some tough times. For a while Garth thought she was the reincarnation of Tula. She is the only Sher'Hedeen who will willingly assist outsiders.
- Lorena Marquez: Also known as the second Aquagirl, Lorena was a regular human from San Diego, California, who was changed into a water-breather during the earthquake that befell that city.
- Lori Lemaris: A mermaid from Tritonis, a city in the lost continent of Atlantis.
- Mera: Aquaman's wife, who has the power to form structures made of hard water. She is also a member of the Justice League. Former princess of Xebel.
- Mupo: A self-styled Poseidonis revolutionary who began an uprising against Narkran, who took over the city while Aquaman was searching for Mera. He was a close friend of Tula and Garth, who were around the same age as he.
- Murk: The leader of the Men-of-War, the frontline army of Atlantis. He has trained in the fire pits and was the sole survivor so that he could protect their nation from the "evils of man".
- Neptune Perkins: A Golden Age water-breathing hero and later U.S. Senator. Died during Infinite Crisis.
- Nuidis Vulko: A politician and royal scholar of Atlantis, acting as mentor to Aquaman. Providing sage wisdom and advice in times of crisis, he is the city's oldest dignitary.
- Nuada Silverarm: A powerful sorceress and friend of Aquaman who is queen of the Atlantean city Thierna Na Oge.
- Ondine: Former member of the Widowhood of Atlantis, she works for them helping in shady circumstances.
- Porm: A dolphin that acted as a surrogate mother for Aquaman. Killed during the events of The Final Night event.
- Quisp: A "water-sprite" with magical powers who was Aquaman's friend, but more often simply a nuisance. Later revealed to be a fifth-dimensional imp named Qwsp.
- Richard Mission: Aquaman's advisor during the time he was Poseidonis' ambassador to the UN.
- S'ona: The Queen of Tritonis, wife of Iqula.
- Stephen Shin: A marine biologist and good friend of Tom Curry, who mentored young Aquaman after his father discovered his unique abilities. He soon became obsessed with finding the lost city of Atlantis and attempted to kill Aquaman for not revealing its location.
- Spought: Went to Thierna na Oge when Aquaman freed him from his guardianship duties. He is long-lived and has some magical abilities.
- Swatt: The only Atlantean that cannot breathe underwater, but possesses some other unique abilities. He spends a lot of time on the surface and knows his way around.
- Thomas Curry: A lighthouse keeper in Maine, and the father of Aquaman. His wife is Atlanna, the Queen of Atlantis. In addition to instructing the child through the ways of the surface world, he is also his grounding in humanity.
- Topo: An octopus who was Aquaman's trained pet in various 1950s and 1960s stories. Originally depicted as a normal octopus with human-level intelligence, Topo is later depicted as a humanoid octopus.
- Tsunami: Japanese superheroine, ex-wife of Neptune Perkins.
- Tula: Also known as the first Aquagirl; for a time, she was Aqualad's girlfriend. Post-New 52, she is the half-sister of Orm Marius.

== Animal companions ==
- Imp: Aqualad's seahorse steed.
- Storm: Aquaman's seahorse steed.
- Thunder: Aquaman's second seahorse steed.
- Tusky: Aqualad's pet walrus.

== See also ==
- List of Green Arrow supporting characters
- List of Superman supporting characters
- List of Wonder Woman supporting characters
- List of Green Lantern supporting characters
- List of Batman supporting characters
- List of Flash supporting characters
