= Lucy Lane =

- Lucy Lane in Superman vol. 3 #12 (October 2012). Art by Dan Jurgens.

Publication information
- Publisher: DC Comics
- First appearance: Superman's Pal Jimmy Olsen #36 (April 1959)
- Created by: Otto Binder (writer); Curt Swan (artist)

In-story information
- Supporting character of: Superman; Supergirl
- Notable aliases: Superwoman
- Abilities: As Superwoman; Superhuman strength, Invulnerability, Flight, Freeze breath, Heat vision, healing factor

Lucy Lane is a fictional supporting character in American comic books published by DC Comics. She is the younger sister of Lois Lane, and one of several characters who have assumed the Superwoman identity.

She was played by Maureen Teefy in the 1984 film Supergirl and Peyton List in the series Smallville. Jenna Dewan played two different versions of the character in the series Supergirl and Superman & Lois.

== Publication history ==
Lucy Lane was created by writer Otto Binder and artist Curt Swan. She was introduced in Superman's Pal Jimmy Olsen #36 (April 1959). She is the daughter of Ella and Sam Lane, and the younger sister of Lois Lane.

== Fictional character biography ==
Jimmy Olsen and Lucy Lane, from her debut. Art by Curt Swan and John Giunta.

In the Silver Age stories, Lucy was presented as an airline stewardess who was an on-again, off-again romantic interest of Jimmy Olsen. Lucy's Silver Age appearances often revolved around Jimmy's various attempts at romancing her. A wedding took place in Superman's Pal, Jimmy Olsen issue #100 (March 1967) which was intended to be a permanent change to the comic's status quo, but editor Mort Weisinger changed his mind at the last minute, and had writer Leo Dorfman change the ending to include a sudden annulment of the marriage.

The character was believed to have died in Superman's Girl Friend, Lois Lane #120 (March 1972) but was later revived in a story in Superman's Pal Jimmy Olsen #160 (October 1973).

Lucy was reintroduced into DC Comics' continuity in The Man of Steel #5 (December 1986). Lucy was an air traffic controller, but became affected by a mysterious blindness (implied to have poisoned by Lex Luthor) that was cured as a side-effect of the destruction of a Bizarro clone. Lucy returned to her job and had a brief relationship with Jimmy Olsen. After many encounters with super-villains such as Sleez, Deathstroke, and even becoming a vampire bride, she eventually started dating Ron Troupe. When Lucy became pregnant, her conservative father was enraged although Lucy explained "There's not a racist bone in Daddy's body. He hates all his daughters' beaus." Sam Lane eventually overcame his anger when Lucy and Ron were married and their child was born.

=== New Krypton ===
After a long disappearance from the principal storylines, Lucy Lane returns in the one shot Superman: New Krypton. Her past with Ron Troupe is unclear, they are possibly estranged (Troupe having resurfaced in the current storylines, working again with the Daily Planet). Her long disappearance is explained by her joining the military, in a desperate, post-mortem attempt to appease her (presumed) dead father's desire to have a son able to carry on his career in the military. Bitter and angrier than in her former appearances, she still blames Lois for General Sam Lane's apparent death during the war against Imperiex. Essentially, she thinks Lois broke his heart by putting her love for Superman before her duties as a daughter.

Lucy references her former appearances, even mentioning her "dating boys in Lois' circle" as failed attempts to live her life through her more successful sister, but she eventually chooses to sacrifice her life and live the military career her father intended for Lois, driving an even deeper wedge between the two sisters. Unbeknownst to her, their father is still alive, and working with the government.

=== Superwoman ===
Lucy Lane as Superwoman. Art by Jamal Igle.

Lucy first appeared as Superwoman in Supergirl #35, her costume a nod to that of the Bronze Age Superwoman Kristin Wells and containing a containment field that simulated Kryptonian powers. Lucy's identity was not revealed until near the story arc's end. During her tenure as Superwoman, she was ordered by her father, General Sam Lane, to kill Agent Liberty, who had been spying on General Lane and Lex Luthor. She later attacked Reactron, which tipped off readers that Superwoman was not Kryptonian (in that the villain's Gold Kryptonite power source had no effect on her). Supergirl unmasks Superwoman, and accidentally kills her by rupturing the containment field of her suit, causing Lucy's body to contort and explode.

In Supergirl Annual #1 readers are given the current modern backstory of Lucy Lane. In the story, Lucy, since the moment she was born, has felt overshadowed by her big sister Lois. Lucy always felt that Lois outperformed her, overshadowed her and was more loved by their father. Lucy never blamed Lois, but instead blamed their parents. Feeling that by maybe being closer to Lois her father would pay more attention to her, Lucy moved to the same city but this came at the same time Lois and her father grew apart over Superman. Lucy then enlisted in the army, quickly rising through the ranks to become a decorated senior officer. During the Amazon attack on the United States, Lucy was nearly killed by two Amazons but was saved by Codename: Assassin. Awakening in Project 7734, her father is able to convince Lucy to put on the Superwoman suit, which possessed mystical qualities.

Although seemingly dead, Lucy's remains steal the lifeforce of a man who came too close. When Lucy is recovered by General Lane's forces, they learn that the suit's mystic energies have somehow transformed her into an actual Kryptonian.

Following the War of the Supermen storyline, Lucy is in custody in S.T.A.R. Labs by Kimiyo Hoshi and Gangbuster, who are attempting to remove Lucy's metahuman abilities. After interference by an object that crashes into a Metropolis park, before they leave Lucy's holding cell, it is shown seemingly to have lightly cracked. Later, Lucy is visited by her sister Lois, who wants to talk. Lucy is unhelpful as she has completely given in to insanity. Lois tells Lucy that she is disgusted by her and walks away leaving Lucy in S.T.A.R. Labs custody behind. Although the crack in the cell seemed to hint at Lucy escaping at some point, nothing came of it, and once The New 52 was launched, all storylines in progress in DC were dropped in favor of the new continuity.

=== The New 52 ===
In September 2011, The New 52 rebooted DC's continuity. In this new timeline, Lucy Lane is first seen where she was picked up from the train station by Lois after Clark Kent was unable to fulfill his promise to Lois to do it himself. Later to make up for it, Clark accompanies her, Lois, Johnathan Carrol, and Morgan Edge to the most expensive restaurant in town but is later forced to leave her with the check due to his duties as Superman. Clark later makes it up to her by taking her bungee jumping, an activity which Lucy enjoys.

Lucy befriended and later became roommates with Amanda Suresh after they met while white water rafting, starting a low-key relationship with her. They also adopted a cat named Simon. Amanda became ill and Doctor Ostermann gave her drugs to take, the drugs having secretly been taken from an alien fungus which would mutate the user into a shapeshifting creature. Lucy and Amanda both took the pills resulting in the latter turning into a wolf-like creature and the former into a giant insect-like creature. An organization named the Cartel began kidnapping users of the drug, which had begun circulating on the streets, for detox and they managed to capture Amanda. Lucy convinced Lois to save Amanda. In her insect form, Lucy rescued Lois and Amanda from the Cartel's base. The issue ended with Lois comforting a hysterical Lucy.

== Powers and abilities ==
Although Superwoman originally had no inherent powers, her powersuit altered her DNA via a containment field to resemble that of a Kryptonian and as such would potentially make her capable of all the same feats they possess under the yellow sun. The abilities she has used thus far are; vast (possibly limitless) superhuman strength, speed and durability, invulnerability, flight (normal and interstellar), freeze breath and heat vision. The powersuit protects her from the harmful effects of Kryptonite and grants her the ability to steal the life of someone nearby to resurrect herself. Any other non-Kryptonian abilities the suit may possess have yet to be revealed. Due to the launch of the New 52, it is unlikely that any of the suit's other powers will be revealed unless it makes an appearance in the new continuity.

As a result of her resurrection in Supergirl #50, she is said to have all the inherent abilities and weaknesses of "Those alien races" which were duplicated by the suit as the result of her return from the dead. While the exact number of alien races whose powers are duplicated by the suit are unknown, Kryptonian powers are among the powerset, as she displayed the ability to use Heat Vision shortly after her recovery by Sam Lane's forces when she was reborn. She confirms that she possesses super hearing when she murders a scientist working for Lane, though she does so with some form of energy blast from her hand, a power that is not among the abilities of a Kryptonian. If this statement is accurate, Lucy Lane now shares the inherent weakness to Kryptonite which all Kryptonians possess.

== In other media ==
=== Television ===
Lucy and Lois Lane as depicted in Smallville (top). Jenna Dewan as Lucy Lane in Supergirl.
- A young Lucy Lane appears in the Superman: The Animated Series episode "Monkey Fun", voiced by Aria Curzon.
- Lucy Lane appears in Lois & Clark: The New Adventures of Superman, initially portrayed by Elizabeth Barondes and subsequently by Roxana Zal.
- Lucy Lane appears in Smallville, portrayed by Peyton List. This version is an intelligent femme fatale who speaks different languages, is an expert at skiing and violin playing, and had an easier childhood than Lois.
- Lucy Lane appears in Supergirl (2015), portrayed by Jenna Dewan. This version is a major in the United States Army Judge Advocate General's Corps.
- Lucy Lane appears in Superman & Lois, portrayed again by Jenna Dewan. This version is a doppelgänger of the Supergirl incarnation and a member of Ally Alston's Inverse Society cult who is estranged from her family following a near-fatal suicide attempt, having come to see Ally as a surrogate mother figure. After Ally reveals her intentions to merge her Earth with the Inverse Earth, Lucy defects to Superman and makes amends with Lois once Ally is defeated and imprisoned.

=== Film ===
A teenage Lucy Lane appears in Supergirl (1984), portrayed by Maureen Teefy.
