= Luma Lynai =

- Luma Lynai as Superwoman, from Action Comics #289. Art by Jim Mooney.

Publication information
- Publisher: DC Comics
- First appearance: Action Comics #289 (June 1962)
- Created by: Jerry Siegel (script); Jim Mooney (artist)

In-story information
- Place of origin: Staryl
- Notable aliases: Superwoman
- Abilities: Super-powers similar to Superman, but only under an orange sun

Luma Lynai is a fictional character in the DC Comics, one of many to use the alias Superwoman. She first appeared in the story "Superman's Super Courtship!" in Action Comics #289 (June 1962).

== Fictional character biography ==
In "Superman's Super Courtship", Supergirl tries to find a mate for the lonely Superman. After match-making attempts with Helen of Troy and Saturn Girl fail, Supergirl uses the computer in the Fortress of Solitude and discovers a super-powered woman on the distant planet of Staryl named Luma Lynai.

Superman flies to Staryl and the two heroes fall in love. However, Superman discovers that Luma's powers only work under the rays of an orange sun. The rays of a yellow sun, such as that of Earth, are deadly to her, meaning that she cannot travel to Earth to be with him.

Imposters of Luma, Lori Lemaris, and Lyla Lerrol appear in Superman's Girl Friend, Lois Lane #97 (November 1968).

== Other appearances ==
JSA Classified #3 (2005), a "Luma-dressed" Kara Zor-El holds her "daughter" Power Girl. Art by Amanda Conner.

Luma Lynai makes a minor appearance in The Kingdom: Planet Krypton #1.

An alternate future version of Supergirl who resembles Luma Lynai appears in JSA: Classified #3 (November 2005).

Luma Lynai appears in 2019's The Green Lantern as a member of the United Planets.
