= List of Green Lantern supporting characters =

This is a list of Green Lantern supporting characters.

In chronological order with name, first appearance and description.

== Golden Age ==
Character	First appearance	Description
Justice Society of America	All Star Comics #3 (Winter 1940)	A group of masked heroes that joined together to face a growing threat within America. Green Lantern was a founding member.
Doiby Dickles	All-American Comics #27 (June 1941)	The Green Lantern's sidekick, a taxi driver who later marries Queen Raima of Myrg.
Molly Mayne	All-American Comics #89 (September 1941)	A secretary at Gotham Radio WXYZ working in the same office as Alan Scott, Molly Mayne became the costumed criminal Harlequin to interact with Green Lantern. After years of playing their game, Molly would become Scott's second wife.
Rose Canton	Flash Comics #89 (November 1947)	Developing dissociative identity disorder at a young age, Rose Canton was exposed to the sap of a jungle root on the island Tashmi which made her transform into another persona able to control plant life. After years of battling the Flash, the Amazons of Paradise Island believed they cured her of her disease. Under the guise of Alyx Florin, she courted Alan Scott and they married. The couple gave birth to twins, Jennifer-Lynn Hayden and Todd Rice.
Streak the Wonder Dog	Green Lantern #30 (February–March 1948)	Green Lantern's canine sidekick.

== Silver and Bronze Age ==
Character	First appearance	Description
Green Arrow	More Fun Comics #73 (November 1941)	A socially conscious hero that took Hal Jordan on a trip across America to show him injustices in society from greed and hate. The two became close friends.
Flash	Showcase #4 (October 1956)	Serving with Hal Jordan on the Justice League, the unlikely pair became close friends.
Carl Ferris	Showcase #22 (September–October 1959)	Owner and operator of Ferris Aircraft that served with Martin Jordan, as part of the Four Musketeers, and employed the pilot and later his son-in-law Hal.
Carol Ferris	Showcase #22 (September–October 1959)	Daughter of Carl Ferris and the current owner of Ferris Aircraft. Carol and Hal Jordan have had a long time on-and-off romantic relationship. She would be a Star Sapphire (and is so presently as their queen) and host the Predator entity.
Justice League	The Brave and the Bold #28 (February/March 1960)	Group of costumed heroes that protected the world against some of its worst threats. Hal Jordan was a founding member and several other Green Lanterns have served as members.
Guardians of the Universe	Green Lantern (vol. 2) #1 (July 1960)	The founders of the Green Lantern Corps and the organization's regulators operating out of Oa. Notable Guardians include Krona, Appa Ali Apsa, Ganthet, Sayd, and Scar.
Thomas Kalmaku	Green Lantern (vol. 2) #2 (October 1960)	A former mechanic for Ferris Aircraft who was Hal Jordan's best friend and came to be a partner for the company.
Gnaxos	Green Lantern (vol. 2) #4 (January–February 1961)	A robot made by the Weaponers of Qward to battle the Green Lantern Corps but instead allied itself with its enemy. Gnaxos would be destroyed by its former masters.
Green Lantern Corps	Green Lantern (vol. 2) #9 (November–December 1961)	A peace keeping force organized by the Guardians of the Universe that added Hal Jordan to their ranks upon the death of Abin Sur and later several other men of Earth. Composed of thousands of members, there are dozens of notable members with several members from Earth.
Jack Jordan	Green Lantern (vol. 2) #9 (November–December 1961)	Hal Jordan's elder brother that was involved in a car crash with his inebriated brother that saw his friend Andy paralyzed. Jack also blamed Hal for the short life of their mother because Hal broke a promise to follow in their test pilot father's footsteps. Jack would be the district attorney of Coast City. Later, he and his wife died.
Jim Jordan	Green Lantern (vol. 2) #9 (November–December 1961)	Hal's younger brother who was suspected of being Green Lantern by reporter Sue Williams. Jim and Sue would later marry and move back to largely vacant rebuilt Coast City after its destruction by Cyborg Superman. Hal tells Jim that he's the Green Lantern.
Zamarons	Green Lantern (vol. 2) #16 (October 1962)	Once part of the Maltusian race, the Zamarons split from the Guardians of the Universe in the belief that life needs emotion and had no interest in forming a peace keeping force for the universe.
Honor Team of Thronn	Green Lantern (vol. 2) #32 (October 1964)	The main force of protectors for the planet Thronn, the Honor Team was composed of heroes Energiman, Magicko, Strong Girl, and Golden Blade. Energiman was tapped into the same energy as the Green Lanterns and sacrificed himself to summon Hal Jordan to save the group and battle a threat to their planet.
Dorine Clay	Green Lantern (vol. 2) #36 (April 1965)	An alien from the planet Garon that came to Earth to escape her oppressive world. She would return home to organize a rebellion but instead fled with some of her people as their world was targeted by the Psions, moving to Aoran (left barren by Evil Star) with the help of Hal Jordan. Dorine would travel with Jordan as his companion.
Controllers	Adventure Comics #357 (June 1967)	Formerly part of the Maltusian race, the Controllers separated from them over their differing beliefs on dealing with evil. They would form the Darkstars that tried to fill the void left after Parallax destroyed the Green Lantern Corps.
Eve Doremus	Green Lantern (vol. 2) #58 (January 1968)	Hal Jordan's girlfriend when he lived in Evergreen City.
Itty	The Flash 238 (December 1975)	A creature that accompanied Hal Jordan during a period in his career and metamorphosed into several forms before becoming a tall, blue humanoid. Itty believed itself the last of its species (the Lasma), but later discovered that a single female survived. The pair gave birth to a new generation of Lasma and left their children in Hal Jordan's care.
Halla's	Green Lantern (vol. 2) #90 (August–September 1976)	A race of protectors that were employed after the failure of the Manhunters and prior to the Green Lantern Corps. A trio of Halla's were discovered in suspended animation on Earth along with their prisoner Jinn. Hal Jordan would send all four to Oa, stating the three would be trained as Green Lanterns.
Air Wave	Green Lantern (vol. 2) #100 (January 1978)	Nephew of Martin Jordan and cousin to Hal Jordan, Air Wave took up his father's mantle as the WWII costumed hero Air Wave after discovering he had the ability to turn into energy. Hal Jordan took his cousin on as his apprentice.
Kari Limbo	Green Lantern (vol. 2) #117 (June 1979)	A gypsy and soothsayer, Kari Limbo was Guy Gardner's girlfriend until Gardner was seemingly killed while attempting to recharge his power ring with an exploding power battery. Hal Jordan would comfort Limbo in her grief but would go on to date her before asking for her hand in marriage. On the day of their nuptials, Limbo had a vision that revealed Gardner was alive and trapped in the Phantom Zone. Jordan saved his friend and Limbo stayed at his side as he recovered. Little is known of how the couple parted terms, but when she approached him when he again became a Green Lantern, Gardner angrily rebuffed her. Limbo died in the Coast City disaster.
Omega Men	Green Lantern (vol. 2) #141 (June 1981)	Freedom fighters operating out of the Vegan system which the Guardians made a pact to not interfere in the system's development. They would escape to Earth where they planned an assault on the villainous Citadel, gaining help at different times by Hal Jordan, Superman, and the Teen Titans. When Green Man teamed with the Omega Men against the Spider Guild, he was reprimanded by the Guardians. Green Man chose to give up his ring and join the freedom fighters.
Richard Davis	Green Lantern (vol. 2) #144 (September 1981)	Hal Jordan's mentor in the US Air Force, taking over Carol Ferris' position at Ferris Aircraft under her father Carl when he was no longer capable of flying. While the company was under attack by Bloch Industries, he teamed with Carol and Bruce Gordon to uncover espionage and sabotage against Ferris. He died test piloting a jet designed by Gordon called the Solar Jet that fell under attack by Eclipso and his so-called "Murder Moon."
Doctor Ub'x	Green Lantern Corps #201 (June 1986)	Ub'x is a rodent-like alien of the same species as Ch'p. Initially enemies, the two later become friends after learning that they are among the few who remember the pre-Crisis universe.
Gremlins	Action Comics Weekly #621 (October 11, 1988)	Nickname for Elite Design Consultants, Hal Jordan came to work for the company as a test pilot after his reputation at Ferris Aircraft was damaged by the Manhunters. An aircraft designer inspired by Green Lantern named Francis (but called "Chip") helped Jordan obtain the job, was entrusted with his secret, but whose friendship fell apart when Jordan chose to allow Chip to die during a test of dedication by fellow Lantern Priest. Without Chip covering for him, Jordan would shortly part ways with the Gremlins.
L.E.G.I.O.N.	Invasion! #1 (December 1988)	An intergalactic protection agency on a planetary scale under Vril Dox, the presence of the Green Lantern Corps threatened the paid services of L.E.G.I.O.N. However, when the Corps ceased to exist, the organization's business would drastically increase. When the Corps returned, the two groups would occasionally be tentative allies. Some notable members of L.E.G.I.O.N. included Lobo, Mon-El, Captain Comet, the Durlan, and Lady Quark.
Darkstars	Darkstars #1 (October 1992)	An intergalactic agency designed by the Controllers to actively destroy what they deemed the roots of chaos in the Universe. When Parallax destroyed the Green Lantern Corps, many of the group's survivors went on to become Darkstars, including John Stewart who acted as field commander. Notable members include Donna Troy, Ferrin Colos, Merayn Dethalis, and former Green Lanterns Galius Zed, G'nort, Medphyll, Hollika Rahn, Xax, K'ryssma, Aa, Larvox, and Charlie Vicker.
Green Lantern	Showcase '93 #12 (December 1993)	A friend of Abin Sur, Kristogar Velo took on the name Green Lantern to honor him and act as the guardian of Fae'en. At one point, an invading force came to the planet and the sector's Green Lantern Lan Dibbux tried to help but was repelled. Requesting help from Hal Jordan, the Lanterns were surprised to hear of another taking on their title. Velo would appear and neither he nor the Lanterns were able to quell the invading force individually. However, when Dibbux channeled his power ring energies through Velo's gauntlets creating a force able to drive away the enemy forces. The heroes parted on good terms.

== Modern Age ==
Character	First appearance	Description
Donna Troy	The Brave and the Bold #60 (July 1965)	A longtime super-hero going by the name Wonder Girl, Donna Troy became an intergalactic peacekeeper as a Darkstar after the Titans of Myth stripped her of her powers. She had an on-and-off again relationship with Kyle Rayner.
Jade	All-Star Squadron #25 (September 1983)	Daughter of the Golden Age Green Lantern and the on-and-off again girlfriend of Kyle Rayner.
Flash	Crisis on Infinite Earths #12 (March 1986)	The original Kid Flash and inheritor of the Flash mantle, Wally West served with Kyle Rayner in the JLA. Originally, the pair clashed. Though they were around the same age, Wally was a seasoned hero and admirer of Hal Jordan. However, the pair would eventually become best friends.
Checkmate	Action Comics #598 (March 1988)	Alan Scott served as White King of Checkmate for a brief period.
Ice	Justice League International #12 (April 1988)	Guy Gardner's on-and-off again love interest.
Gardners of the Universe	Guy Gardner #2 (November 1992)	A protection group like LE.G.I.O.N. and the Darkstars, the group that would become the Gardners of the Universe were one of several like organizations to rise after the demise of the Green Lantern Corps. Their name change was prompted after courting Guy Gardner to act as the group's leader. Gardner would eventually leave the group after he paid them back for his yellow power ring taken from him by Lobo and bought back by the Gardners.
Green Arrow	Green Arrow (vol. 2) #0 (1994)	The son of Oliver Queen, Connor Hawke inherited his father's mantle as Green Arrow. In the tradition of their predecessors, Kyle Rayner became a confidant for his fellow new hero and the pair became good friends. Rayner nominated Hawke for the JLA and was accepted.
Alexandra DeWitt	Green Lantern (vol. 3) #48 (January 1994)	Kyle Rayner's girlfriend, who was murdered by Major Force.
Radu Stancu	Green Lantern (vol. 3) #57 (December 1994)	The owner and proprietor of Radu's Coffee in Greenwich village. He rented an apartment above his business to Kyle Rayner and became a confidant to the hero.
Arashi	Green Lantern Plus #1 (December 1996)	A famous heroine in Japan, Arashi battled Doctor Polaris when he planned to destroy the country as part of a bid for world domination. She was saved by Kyle Rayner who, along with the Ray, defeated the villain.
Teen Titans	Titans Secret Files #1 (March 1999)	Formed largely out of teen sidekicks grown into heroic adults, Kyle Rayner joined his friend the Flash in this older incarnation of the Teen Titans.
The Corps	Green Lantern Secret Files #2 (September 1999)	Originally part of a new Green Lantern Corps formed by Kyle Rayner, when the hero decided he wasn't yet ready to begin again the heroic group, they disbanded. Members Anya Savenlovich, Garl Rathbone, and Sool decided to stay together however and formed the Corps, a group of intergalactic crime fighters that were joined in this effort by several others. Rathbone would end up joining the new Green Lantern Corps.
Terry Berg	Green Lantern (vol. 3) #129 (October 2000)	Kyle Rayner's assistant at Feast magazine, Terry Berg became a close friend to Rayner and Rayner was one of the few people Berg confided in as his open homosexuality created a rift with his parents. Berg was the victim of a hate crime when he was severely beaten and hospitalized in a coma when he was seen kissing his boyfriend David. Rayner viciously hunted down the attackers and brutalized them, but stopped short of dealing out the degree of punishment done to his friend as to not sink to their level. Berg would come out of his coma and go through extensive physical therapy with help from David, Jade, and John Stewart but Rayner left Earth shortly afterward with guilt over Berg's injuries. When Rayner returned to Earth, he moved into an apartment together with Berg who sold his story to be made into a book.
Ishtar	Green Lantern Annual (vol. 3) #9 (September 2000)	An archaeologist and the descendant of the goddess Ishtar, in actuality a Controller, Sala Nisaba took up the fight against Nergal (also a Controller) with help from Kyle Rayner. When Sala became trapped in the magic land of Kurnugi, Rayner returned with the JLA to rescue her.
Lianna	Green Lantern (vol. 3) #160 (May 2003)	One of the Guardians of the Universe resurrected by Kyle Rayner, she prematurely developed her powers, changing into the appearance of a tall, muscular blue humanoid, and menaced a nearby planet. She would return to Oa with Ganthet but later joined the Zamarons. After coming into contact with a Heartstone, she would join the Omega Men. It was later revealed Lianna is a hybrid of Guardian and Zamaron DNA.
C.E.M.A.	Green Lantern (vol. 3) #166 (August 2003)	The Cosmic Emergency Management Agency, C.E.M.A. is an intergalactic agency that helps worlds hit by disaster. One commander, Ashari, was revealed to be in alliance with Amon Sur and the Black Circle.
Tsunami	Green Lantern (vol. 3) #166 (August 2003)	A space-faring vessel for researchers, they came into contact with Kyle Rayner while investigating a phenomenon called the Blind that destroys star systems. When they assisted Rayner with stopping the threat, they drew the ire of the Black Circle.
Jillian Pearlman	Green Lantern (vol. 4) #1 (July 2005)	A fighter pilot for the US Air Force under the call sign "Cowgirl", her and Hal Jordan began a relationship with each other and would move in together. For a brief time, Pearlman was a Star Sapphire.
Jonathan Stone	Green Lantern (vol. 4) #2 (August 2005)	Serving with Martin Jordan as one of the Four Musketeers, Stone would help Hal Jordan into the test pilot program. Presently, Stone operates Edwards Air Force Base (which hosts Hangar 44, a prison for Green Lantern's rogues).
Ken Arden	Green Lantern (vol. 4) #2 (August 2005)	One of the Four Musketeers, Arden would establish the testing facility Arden Aviation. He would hire Hal Jordan as a mechanic where he first met Tom Kalmaku. Arden sold his business to Carl Ferris under the stipulation Jordan would be hired on.
Blue Beetle	Infinite Crisis #3 (February 2006)	Taking up the Blue Beetle tradition from his predecessors, Jaime Reyes fused with the Reach Scarab Khaji Da not knowing it was a weapon employed by the Reach, ancient enemies of the Guardians. Reyes would befriend Gardner and serve with him in the reformed Justice League International.
Sinestro Corps	Green Lantern (vol. 4) #10 (May 2006)	Formed by Sinestro alongside Parallax, the Anti-Monitor, Superboy-Prime, and Cyborg Superman, the Sinestro Corps were formed to bring order to the universe through domination and fear, making them the diametric opponent to the Green Lantern Corps. However, after the threat Nekron posed the universe, the Sinestro Corps made an uneasy alliance with the other Corps of the emotional spectrum in the universe.
Star Sapphires	Green Lantern (vol. 4) #20 (July 2007)	Originally an enemy on Earth of the Golden Age Flash and later Hal Jordan, the Star Sapphire were the creation of the Zamarons after discovering love in the original Star Sapphire crystal. However, its power proved too much for its bearers that would develop psychotic tendencies. After the formation of the Sinestro Corps, the Zamarons crafted the stones into rings which made possible for their bearers to wield them with little effect save bringing out the power of love. They in turn formed their own corps.
Blue Lantern Corps	Green Lantern (vol. 4) #25 (December 2007)	Formed by the Guardians Ganthet and Sayd after being banished by their people, the Blue Lantern Corps were established in preparation for the Blackest Night.
Indigo Tribe	Green Lantern (vol. 4) #25 (December 2007)	A corps that promotes goodwill throughout the universe.
Red Lantern Corps	Green Lantern (vol. 4) #25 (December 2007)	Formed of victims of the Sinestro Corps, they sought the demise of the group and its members until the threat of Nekron forced them into an uneasy alliance.
Bellatrix Bombers	Green Lantern Corps (vol. 2) #21 (April 2008)	A group of peace-keeping mercenaries based out of Bellatrix that used to count Boodikka among their number. While they helped fill the void left by the demise of the Green Lantern Corps, upon the organization's return the Bombers became pirates.
Larfleeze	DC Universe #0 (April 2008)	Discovering the orange power battery on Okaara, Larfleeze became its sole wielder and was left alone by the Guardians. When the Controllers learned of the orange power and sought it, Larfleeze was unleashed on the universe. Initially largely a threat, Larfleeze would join the alliance against Nekron.

== From alternate realities ==
Character	First appearance	Description
Kyle "Ace" Morgan	DC: The New Frontier #1 (March 2004)	Hal Jordan's mentor and friend in the US Air Force. The pair flew together to face the Centre.
Rick Flag	DC: The New Frontier #1 (March 2004)	Hal Jordan's superior in the space program Operation Flying Cloud and friend of Martin Jordan and "Ace" Morgan. Flagg made a promise to Hal's father to watch over him and left Hal behind in Operation Flying Cloud which became a suicide mission.

== In other media ==
Character	First appearance	Description
Kairo	The Superman/Aquaman Hour of Adventure: "Evil is as Evil Does" (1967)	A Venusian and Hal Jordan's sidekick.
Flash	Justice League of America (1997)	Guy Gardner and Barry Allen live together and work beside each other in the JLA.
Warhawk	Batman Beyond: "The Call" (November 11, 2000)	The son of John Stewart and Hawkgirl.
Hawkgirl	Justice League: "Secret Origins" (November 17, 2001)	John Stewart's romantic love interest until the Thanagarian invasion, when she was revealed to have been a spy.
Green Guardsman	Justice League: "Legends" (April 21, 2002)	A superhero from another universe and a member of the Justice Guild of America, whose members were killed in a nuclear war. He is based on Alan Scott.
Vixen	Justice League Unlimited: "Initiation" (July 31, 2004)	John Stewart's girlfriend after she joined Justice League Unlimited.
Razer	Green Lantern: The Animated Series: "Beware My Power" (November 11, 2011)	A reformed Red Lantern who is exclusive to the series. Hal Jordan and Razer traveled together and shared a great bond in the series.
Aya	Green Lantern: The Animated Series: "Beware My Power" (November 11, 2011)	The artificial intelligence of the Interceptor ship.

== See also ==
- Green Lantern (comic book)
- List of Green Lanterns
- List of Green Lantern enemies
- List of Green Arrow supporting characters
- List of Superman supporting characters
- List of Wonder Woman supporting characters
- List of Batman supporting characters
- List of Aquaman supporting characters
