= Paul Westfield =

Dabney Donovan

Publication information
- Publisher: DC Comics
- First appearance: Superman (vol. 2) #58 (August 1991)
- Created by: Dan Jurgens

In-story information
- Full name: Paul Westfield
- Species: Human
- Place of origin: Earth
- Team affiliations: Project Cadmus
- Abilities: Leadership skills

Paul Westfield is a fictional character appearing in American comic books published by DC Comics. He first appeared in Superman (vol. 2) #58 (August 1991) and was created by Dan Jurgens.

== Publication history ==
The executive director of Project Cadmus, the post-Crisis version of Jack Kirby's DNA Project, Westfield was revealed to be in charge of the project in Superman (vol. 2) #58. An unscrupulous director ironically hired for his ethics, he appeared in issues of Superman, Superman: The Man of Steel, The Adventures of Superman and Superboy (vol. 4). A noteworthy story was his plan on creating a clone to take Superman's place during multiple issues of the Funeral for a Friend storyline after The Death of Superman event. This led to the debut of Superboy (Conner Kent) in the following Reign of the Supermen! crossover event.

Superboy was originally depicted as a human clone, with Westfield providing genetic material. The comic series Teen Titans (2003) retroactively established Superboy to be a human-Kryptonian hybrid created from the DNA of Superman and Lex Luthor.

== Fictional character biography ==
=== Project: Bloodhound ===
After a career in the United States military as a soldier in the Vietnam War, Paul Westfield becomes the executive director of Project Cadmus, a secret government agency based outside of Metropolis. When the Guardian, head of security at Cadmus, battles the vigilante Gangbuster (who was revealed to be an entranced Superman), he reports his encounter to Westfield. Westfield feels that Superman is a potential threat to Earth and begins the early phase of a countermeasure called Project: Bloodhound, monitoring Superman for months. After incidents involving the Krypton Man, Westfield becomes convinced that Superman's mental state is deteriorating and sends the "dogs" of the project - Mac, Blood, and Tracker - to capture him. While captured, Superman's mind is probed by Dubbilex and his thoughts are transferred to a computer. After Superman was rescued by the Hairies - advanced humanoid creations of Cadmus - Westfield, Guardian, and Dubbilex learn from the probe that Superman reluctantly killed three Kryptonians (General Zod, Zaora, and Quex-Ul) who killed every being on a pocket universe Earth. The computer and files are destroyed by Guardian, but Westfield still has information on Superman and believes that he had enough evidence for a congressional report against him. When Westfield threatens to court-martial Guardian, the Guardian and Dubbilex threaten to publicly reveal that Westfield killed his mentally unstable commander to save his unit during the Vietnam War, which causes him to relent.

=== Death and return of Superman ===
Westfield wants Cadmus to create a cloned replacement for the fallen Superman following his fight with Doomsday. However, Lex Luthor intervenes with the planned retrieval of Superman's body by federal authority. A team of Cadmus troops, accompanied by Westfield, steals Superman's body from the tomb. However, the original plan to clone Superman via a DNA sample is unsuccessful. Superman's body is given an electron capillary scan, creating an approximation of his genetic code that is stored in a disk. Westfield sends Auron, a cybernetic super-soldier cloned from Guardian, to retrieve the disk by force. Before Westfield can obtain the disk, the clones of the original Newsboy Legion convince Auron to rebel against Westfield, and he departs with the disk to protect Superman's legacy.

Westfield and his team of scientists genetically alter a human clone to resemble Superman and replicate his flight and superhumans strength via a telekinetic field, with Westfield providing genetic material. After twelve failed attempts, the thirteenth clone known as Experiment 13 is artificially aged to a teenager and given implanted memories. However, the clone resists mental programming from Cadmus and escapes their custody with help from the Newsboy Legion. He assumes the mantle of Superman, refusing to be called Superboy.

Following Reign of the Supermen!, Westfield secretly sends DNAliens to capture Superboy. After learning the circumstances of his creation, Superboy agrees to let Superman have the rights to the Superman name, trademark, and symbol while Superman agrees to let him use the "Superboy" name. Superboy decides to go on a world tour to establish his new name and Project Cadmus assigns Dubbilex to chaperone Superboy.

=== Fall of Metropolis ===
In the "Fall of Metropolis" story arc, a clone plague erupts into open warfare in the streets of Metropolis between Westfield's Project Cadmus and Lex Luthor's LexCorp when Lex Luthor contracts the clone virus and accuses Cadmus of infecting him. The Underworlders, exiled creations of Cadmus led by Clawster, take advantage of the conflict to attack Cadmus troops and civilians. Westfield tries to exterminate the Underworlders with a missile aimed at the heart of Metropolis, but the missile is destroyed by Superman. Dabney Donovan, the creator of the Underworlders and the clone virus, murders Westfield and cuts off his ear as a trophy.

=== Legacy ===
During the "Hypertension" story arc of the Superboy series, an alternate universe version of Superboy is introduced. He was grown to full age to become Superman, but later became Black Zero in the midst of anti-clone sentiment. Black Zero conquers his version of Earth and places the Paul Westfield of his universe in charge, considering him a father figure. Black Zero "rescues" other universes in which he feels that clones were being oppressed and leaves each world's version of Westfield in charge of the clones. One of the versions of Westfield is personally responsible for the death of his universe's Superboy, with the latter surviving long enough to warn the mainstream reality's Superboy of Black Zero. This version of Westfield later jumps into a Hyperium reactor, which erases himself and all alternate reality versions of Westfield from existence.

== In other media ==
Paul Westfield appears in the BBC radio drama adaptation of "The Death of Superman", "Funeral For a Friend", and "Reign of the Supermen!" storylines.
