= Lyla Lerrol =

Fictional character

- Lyla Lerrol in Superman #141, art by Wayne Boring.

Publication information
- Publisher: DC Comics
- First appearance: Superman #141 (November 1960)
- Created by: Jerry Siegel; Wayne Boring

In-story information
- Species: Kryptonian
- Place of origin: Krypton

Lyla Lerrol is a character appearing in American comic books published by DC Comics. She first appeared in the Superman newspaper strip on August 27, 1960 before her comics debut in Superman #141, published September 15 of the same year. She is one of the many Superman characters with the initials "LL" (others include Lois Lane, Lex Luthor, Lori Lemaris, and Lana Lang).

== Fictional character biography ==
=== Pre-Crisis ===
In pre-Crisis continuity, Lyla Lerrol is a Kryptonian actress who Superman meets and falls in love with after accidentally traveling back in time and becoming stranded on Krypton shortly before its destruction. While attempting to aid his father Jor-El in his effort to develop a rocket ship, he accidentally meets Lyla. The two immediately feel an attraction to each other, one which quickly grows into love after Superman saves Lyla when their rocket goes out of control.

Resigned to being stranded on Krypton, Superman is prepared to marry Lyla when fate intervenes again. While working on the set of one of Lyla's films, Superman becomes trapped inside a full-sized model rocket with a Kryptonian Flame Beast. The force of the Flame Beast's breath propels the ship away from Krypton. Once he approaches a yellow sun, Superman's powers return. However, he realizes that it is impossible for him to return to Krypton and save Lyla.

In the story "For the Man Who Has Everything", Superman is attacked by a plant-like alien called the Black Mercy and trapped in a dream world. In his fantasy life, Krypton was never destroyed, and a grown Kal-El is married to Lyla Lerrol (spelled Ler-Rol).

=== Post-Crisis ===
In post-Crisis continuity, a version of Lyla appears in the 2004 story arc Superman: Godfall. This version is an alien empath from a society that persecuted all other aliens, but empaths in particular. Lyla's father told her all of the old myths about Superman, who she believed to be a god.

After encountering an exhausted Superman, Lyla helps him recover and brainwashes him to believe that Krypton was never destroyed and that he is a low-level government official there. Lyla eventually steals Superman's powers and travels to Metropolis, wanting to have people worship her. However, she stands down after realizing that her beliefs about Superman were wrong. When Superman and a group of Kandorian rebels confront Lyla, she sacrifices herself to stop Preus from killing Superman.
