= Superwoman =

Alias of multiple DC Comics superheroines

Publication information
- Publisher: DC Comics
- First appearance: Action Comics #60 (May 1943)
- Created by: Jerry Siegel; George Roussos

In-story information
- Alter ego: Lois Lane; Luma Lynai; Diana / Lois Lane (Earth 3); Donna Troy (Earth 3); Kristin Wells; Dana Dearden; Lucy Lane; Lana Lang
- Abilities: Lois Lane: Superstrength; superspeed; flight; invulnerability; heat vision; X-ray vision; Kristin Wells: Teleportation; Precognition; Telekinesis; Dana Dearden: Enhanced vision; Limited electrokinesis; Lana Lang: Electric and magnetism manipulation

Superwoman is the name of several fictional characters in DC Comics. Most of them are, like Supergirl, women with powers similar to those of Superman, such as flight, invulnerability, and enhanced strength.

In 1942, DC Comics trademarked the name and an ashcan copy (publication produced solely for legal purposes) was created with the title of Superwoman to prevent competitors from using it. The cover was a reproduction of More Fun Comics #73 with the interior being a reprint of the third issue of Action Comics. The first true appearance of Superwoman was in Action Comics #60 (May 1943).

== Fictional character biography ==
=== Lois Lane ===
Lois Lane's first appearance as Superwoman in Action Comics #60 (May 1943). Art by Joe Shuster.

The first appearance of "Superwoman" in a DC comic was in a May 1943 story in Action Comics #60 by Jerry Siegel and George Roussos, where Lois Lane dreams that she has gained superpowers from a blood transfusion from Superman and launches a career as Superwoman.

Superman #45 (March–April 1947) revisits the theme in a story titled "Lois Lane, Superwoman!" in which a pair of fraudulent magicians cast a "spell" on Lane, making her believe she has superpowers. Circumstances force Superman to play along with the ruse temporarily by using super-speed to invisibly intervene in Lane's adventures to support the illusion. She briefly sports a costume modeled on Superman's before the spell is broken. A story from Action Comics has Lois actually gaining superpowers from one of Lex Luthor's inventions and launching a short-lived career as "Superwoman". Later stories sporadically feature tales in which Lois gains superpowers and functioned as a "Superwoman" of sorts, but all of these are, like the 1951 tale, temporary.

In other pre-Crisis imaginary stories—set outside the main DC continuity within an alternate history or hypothetical future—Lois Lane gains superpowers. In one of these, Sam Lane is a scientist and astrophysicist. He discovers that the Sun will go nova and obliterate the Solar System. Sam and his wife Ella place their infant daughter Lois in a starship and send her to Krypton within a "power beam" that enables faster-than-light travel and modifies Lois's molecular biology. This gives Lois superpowers after she reaches her adopted world, where she is named Kandi Khan. Like Superman in mainstream DC continuity, Kandi/Lois establishes a superhero career, and like Lois and Superman in the mainstream continuity, Supermaid and Kal-El fall for one another. Like Superman in the mainstream DC continuity, Supermaid is vulnerable to fragments of her perished homeworld (Earthite).

Another imaginary story has Clark Kent and Lois exchange places so that she is from Krypton and Kent is an ordinary human, inquisitive about whether or not Lois Lane was Krypton Girl's secret identity.

In 2016, Lois again became Superwoman in the DC Rebirth initiative and appeared as Superwoman in the comic book series Superwoman. The series marks the first ongoing comic book series featuring the Superwoman character. In September 2011, The New 52 rebooted DC's continuity. In this new timeline, Lois and Lana gained superpowers due to the solar energy explosion caused by the death of the New 52 Superman. This results in both Lois and Lana becoming Superwoman with Lois possessing all of Superman's powers, while Lana has the ability to absorb and release solar energy.

Lois returned as Superwoman in DC Comics in the DC All In initiative in 2024. During the "Absolute Power" storyline, Amanda Waller's Amazo robots steal the powers of many metahumans, and some have their powers swapped after regaining their powers. General Zod is among those affected, and Lois gains his powers in Superwoman Special #1.

=== Luma Lynai ===
A woman from the distant planet of Staryl, Luma Lynai wins the heart of Superman. Just as Superman derives his powers from a yellow star, Luma derived her gifts of super-strength and flight from an orange star. Their romance does not last, as Luma becomes deathly ill under the rays of a yellow star, and Superman cannot leave Earth undefended. She physically resembles an adult Kara Zor-El, with a similar costume, except instead of being blue-and-red with a pentagonal S shield, Luma's costume is white-and-green with a circular S emblem.

=== Superwoman (Crime Syndicate) ===
Superwoman is the alias of an alternate-universe counterpart of Wonder Woman from Earth-3. She is a supervillain and member of the Crime Syndicate of America. Unlike her heroic counterpart, this Superwoman is known for her ruthless and manipulative nature, often using her powers for personal gain, domination, and oppression.

=== Gender-swapped Superman ===
Superwoman along with Batwoman and Superlad from Superman/Batman #24 (2006). Art by Ed McGuinness

In Superman #349 ("The Turnabout Trap!"), Superman returns from an interstellar mission to find that everyone on Earth is of the opposite sex. Among them are Wonder Warrior (counterpart of Wonder Woman), Superlad (counterpart of Supergirl), and Superwoman (counterpart of Superman). Believing he has crossed into a parallel universe, Superman flies back to space to find a dimensional portal but is blocked by an invisible barrier. He notices the parallelism fails when he sees Superwoman and Clara Kent (Superwoman's presumed secret identity) are two separate people.

When he confronts Superwoman, Superman discovers that he is regarded as a super-villain in this gender-reversed world, which leads to a battle with Superwoman, Superlad, and Wonder Warrior. They manage to trap Superman with Wonder Warrior on guard, but he manages to escape and takes Wonder Warrior's magic lasso with him. Superman figures out that his foe Mr. Mxyzptlk is behind this gender-reversed world. Superman discovers as well that he was never in a parallel universe, but rather on Earth, which Mxyzptlk had altered with his magic. Superman uses Wonder Warrior's magic lasso to make Mxyzptlk say his name backwards and thus returning him to his native dimension, the effects of Mxyzptlk's magic vanish, returning Earth to normal.

=== Laurel Kent ===
A new Superwoman named Laurel exists in Earth-11, a universe populated by gender-swapped versions of existing characters. In December 2007, Superwoman and Batwoman were featured in Countdown Presents: The Search for Ray Palmer: Superwoman/Batwoman #1.

The Multiversity Guidebook, released as part of The Multiversity, showed new versions of the characters from Earth-11, more closely resembling New Earth after the Flashpoint event, with equivalent costumes to their New Earth counterparts, indicating their world had also been affected by the Flashpoint storyline, though the exact nature of those changes is unrevealed.

=== Kristin Wells ===
Superwoman (Kristin Wells). Art by Gil Kane, 1983.

Another version of Superwoman, this one a heroic character, came about in the form of Kristin Wells, who was created by Elliot S. Maggin. Wells first appeared in Maggin's Superman novel Miracle Monday, but he later introduced her in DC Comics Presents Annual #2 (1983) as Superwoman. Wells is a 29th-century descendant of Jimmy Olsen and a superhero history teacher, who time travels back to the 20th century and brings superpower-granting future technology to allow her to keep up with, study and follow reports of a “Superwoman” during this era.

=== Dana Dearden ===
The Dana Dearden Superwoman

Obsessed Superman fan Dana Dearden dated Jimmy Olsen to get close to Superman, and when that did not work she stole mystic artifacts which granted her the strength of Hercules, the speed of Hermes, the thunderbolts of Zeus, and the sight of Heimdall. Dana donned a green-and-purple uniform, with "Superwoman" written down the leggings, and called herself Superwoman, and tried to get Superman to fall in love with her. He rejected her advances, and Jimmy called her "Obsession". She vanished attempting to help Superman rescue people from a burning ship.

When Superman was split into his Red and Blue energy forms, Superwoman returned hoping that one of the Supermen would return her feelings, but Maxima intervened, and used her telepathy to convince Superwoman that she would destroy Superman with her love.

The telepathic illusion wore off and she would try to win Superman over again, this time in a red-and-blue costume similar to his, and claimed to be his wife in response to a recent photograph of Superman wearing a wedding ring. During a subsequent attack of humans using the DMN drug—which turned the users into violent demons until the "high" was over—Superman convinced her to help him stop the DMN users, arguing that, if she truly loved him, she would help him do his duty rather than attack him for potentially picking someone else over her. Superwoman dies trying to protect him from one of the DMN users.

=== Lucy Lane ===
Lucy Lane, New Krypton Superwoman

Lucy Lane first appeared as Superwoman in Supergirl (vol. 5) #35 (January 2009), her costume a nod to that of the Bronze Age Superwoman Kristin Wells and containing a containment field that simulated Kryptonian powers. However, Lucy's identity was not revealed until near the story arc's end. During her tenure as Superwoman, she was blackmailed by her father, General Sam Lane, into performing acts of villainy such as murdering Agent Liberty, who had been spying on General Lane and Lex Luthor. This resulted in her being the focus of the Supergirl Faces of Evil issue.

Lucy Lane later attacks Reactron, which tipped off readers that Superwoman was not Kryptonian, since the villain's gold kryptonite power source had no effect on her. Supergirl unmasks Superwoman, and accidentally kills her by rupturing the containment field of her suit, causing Lucy's body to contort and explode.

In the Supergirl annual Lucy is brought back to life by the suit as it steals the life of another person. The suit is then revealed to be a magical creation of Mirabai of the Forlorn, ally of Sam Lane, who mystically infused in it the genetic abilities of several alien races of Kryptonian might: when Supergirl ruptured it, the backlash gave Lucy innate Kryptonian abilities.

=== Lana Lang ===
Superwoman #10 (July 2017) art by Ken Lashley.

When Superman died, Lana Lang and Lois Lane both absorbed energy released from his body and the two women developed superhuman powers. Lana gained the power to convert solar radiation into various forms of electromagnetic energy, while Lois developed powers similar to Superman's. Both Lana and Lois became Superwoman. After Lois' death, Lana became the sole Superwoman.

During Superman Reborn, it was revealed that the powers Lois and Lana received were the leftover energy from the New-52 Superman. The Post-Crisis Superman took that energy into himself to become an amalgam leaving Lana seemingly powerless and confused. Some energy remained within her suit which was later found to be red kryptonite radiation. In the series Steelworks, Lana inadvertently regains her powers when John Henry Irons provides Metropolis with free energy using Genesis.

== Other uses ==
Various comic stories, pre- and post-Crisis, offer glimpses of possible futures assuming that one of the various incarnations of Supergirl would eventually change her codename to Superwoman upon reaching adulthood. One example is The Superman Family #200 (April 1980) in which all the stories are set in the then-near future 1999 or 2000 (the timeframe is cited only as "the turn of the century") with the characters aged appropriately, including an older Linda Danvers (Kara Zor-El) who divides her time between her career as Superwoman and serving as governor of Florida.

In the series All-Star Superman, set in an alternate universe, Lois Lane is given an Exo-Gene formula that gives her Kryptonian powers for 24 hours.

Alternatively, some stories assume one of Superman's female descendants would assume the name "Superwoman", like his daughter Kara and great-granddaughter Lara from the Elseworlds series, Superman & Batman: Generations.

== In other media ==
=== Television ===
- On Lois and Clark: The New Adventures of Superman, Lois, portrayed by Teri Hatcher, gains Superman's powers and adopts the name Ultra Woman in a homonymous episode.
- While not called Superwoman, Lana and Lois, portrayed by Kristin Kreuk and Erica Durance respectively, each temporarily gain Clark's powers in Smallville.
- A gender-swapped incarnation of Superwoman appears in the Justice League Action short "True Colors" as a brief transformation that Superman undergoes due to pink kryptonite.
- A variation of Lana Lang/Superwoman from Bizarro World appears in Superman & Lois, portrayed by Emmanuelle Chriqui.

=== Film ===
The Lois Lane incarnation of Superwoman appears in All-Star Superman, voiced by Christina Hendricks.
