= Heat vision =

Heat vision may refer to:

- Thermography, infrared imaging used to reveal temperature
- Thermoception, the sensation and perception of temperature
- Heat vision (fiction), the fictional ability to burn objects with one's gaze
- Heat Vision (blog), an American entertainment blog

== See also ==
- Heat Vision and Jack, an American television pilot
