= Professor Potter =

Fictional character in stories published by DC Comics

Publication information
- Publisher: DC Comics
- First appearance: Superman's Pal, Jimmy Olsen #22 (August 1957)
- Created by: Otto Binder (writer); Curt Swan (artist)

In-story information
- Full name: Phineas Potter
- Supporting character of: Superman; Jimmy Olsen

Professor Potter is a fictional character appearing in American comic books published by DC Comics, primarily in association with Superman.

== Publication history ==
Phineas Potter first appeared in Superman's Pal, Jimmy Olsen #22 (August 1957) and was created by Otto Binder and Curt Swan.

== Fictional character biography ==
=== Pre-Crisis ===
The original incarnation of Professor Potter is the uncle of Lana Lang and first encounters the Man of Steel during his teenage years as Superboy. A professor and eccentric scientist, Potter often invents odd or fantastical devices for the betterment of humanity. However, he rarely considers the potential downsides of his inventions. While several of his devices are harmless, many others are not and cause chaos when activated.

Potter befriended three newspaper reporters from the Daily Planet: Lois Lane, Jimmy Olsen, and Clark Kent. Olsen, in particular, is often the victim of Potter's inventions gone awry. Thanks to the professor, Olsen was briefly evolved into a super-intelligent being, given an elongated nose, stricken with "flame-breath", and cursed with an evil twin, among other calamities.

=== Post-Crisis ===
Following Crisis on Infinite Earths, which reboots DC's continuity, Clark Kent's history is revised so that he does not become a superhero until adulthood, and thus never operates as Superboy. Potter appears as a S.T.A.R. Labs scientist uninvolved with Superman. The Superboy he encounters is Conner Kent, a clone of Superman.

== In other media ==
Professor Potter appears in The Adventures of Superboy.
