= Superwoman (Kristin Wells) =

- The Kristin Wells Superwoman, from the cover to DC Comics Presents Annual #2.

Publication information
- Publisher: DC Comics
- First appearance: Superman: Miracle Monday (1981)
- First comic appearance: DC Comics Presents Annual #2 (July 1983)
- Created by: Elliot S. Maggin

In-story information
- Alter ego: Kristin Wells
- Species: (Kristin Wells): Metahuman (Karsta Wor-Ul): Kryptonian
- Notable aliases: Superwoman, Karsta Wor-Ul
- Abilities: Pre-Crisis; Flight; Teleportation; Empathy; Precognition; Telekinesis; Post-Crisis; Flight; Superhuman strength Superhuman speed Invulnerability; Heat vision

Kristin Wells is a superheroine, the secret identity of one version of DC Comics' Superwoman. Created by Superman comic writer Elliot S. Maggin, Wells first appeared in Maggin's novel Superman: Miracle Monday (1981); he later introduced her into comics continuity as Superwoman.

== Fictional character biography ==
Wells is a descendant of Jimmy Olsen who lives in the 29th century. She is a journalism student whose graduate thesis was the successful investigation of the origins of the holiday known as Miracle Monday, using a form of time travel technology that had just begun to be used by the public in her era.

She then became a teacher, but became interested in finding out the identity of Superwoman, the last superhero from the 20th century whose secret identity had never been discovered. She managed to convince the authorities of her time to send her to the past, at the moment when Superwoman was supposed to debut, helping Superman fight a villain called King Kosmos. Wells soon deduced that she was supposed to become Superwoman, and, using some of the technology she had brought from the future which allowed her to have superpowers (including flight, teleportation, empathy, precognition, and telekinesis), she disguised herself and helped Superman defeat Kosmos. She revealed the truth to Superman, then returned to the future to make the information public. Wells realized she would have to periodically return to the 20th century to ensure that all the historical events Superwoman was part of were fulfilled.

However, during one of those trips, a malfunction of the time travel process—which was still imperfect—left Wells trapped in the past, suffering amnesia. This caused her boyfriend to lead a movement against time travel that eventually resulted in the firing of the director as well as stricter guidelines and more severe penalties for their violation. Years later, Wells returned home, apparently having recovered her memories, and was reunited with him. The details of her later activities in the present and her return to the future remained unrevealed. The 29th-century Kristin's last appearances to date are in the non-canonical story Superman: Whatever Happened to the Man of Tomorrow? in 1986, and a cameo in The Kingdom: Planet Come in 1999.

=== Third Kryptonian ===
The post-Crisis Kristin Wells, Karsta War-Ul, as depicted in Superman #670 (January 2008). Art by Rick Leonardi (penciler) and Dan Green (inker).

In Superman: The Third Kryptonian, it is revealed that a third Kryptonian (after Clark and Kara Zor-El) is on Earth. This Kryptonian is eventually revealed to be Karsta Wor-Ul, a character based on Kristen Wells. Karsta is a member of Krypton's Military Council who left Krypton years before its destruction after the Military Council was disbanded in favor of the Science Council.

== Powers and abilities ==
In pre-Crisis continuity, Wells has no inherent superpowers and derives her abilities from 29th-century technology. Wells utilizes a gravity redistribution flight belt which allows her to fly and an opal beam amulet which allows her to become intangible and teleport.

Karsta War-Ul is a Kryptonian who possesses all the powers of Superman under a yellow sun.
