= Auron (character) =

- The Jim Harper incarnation of Auron as depicted in Legacy of Superman #1 (March 1993). Art by Walt Simonson.

Publication information
- Publisher: DC Comics
- First appearance: Lambien: Green Lantern (vol. 2) #142 (July 1981); Jim Harper clone: Legacy of Superman #1 (March 1993)
- Created by: Lambien: Marv Wolfman; Jim Harper clone: Karl Kesel, Walt Simonson

In-story information
- Full name: Lambien
- Species: Lambien: Okaaran/Branxian; Jim Harper clone: Clone/DNAlien
- Place of origin: Vega (Lambien)
- Team affiliations: Omega Men (Lambien)
- Supporting character of: Superman (Jim Harper clone)
- Notable aliases: Jim Harper (second Auron)
- Abilities: Lambien: God-like energy powers Jim Harper clone: Enhanced durability Solar absorption

Auron is the name of two fictional characters appearing in American comic books published by DC Comics. The first Auron is a member of the Omega Men. The second version is a clone of Guardian.

The first Auron originally appeared in Green Lantern (vol. 2) #142 (July 1981) and was created by Marv Wolfman. The second Auron appeared in Legacy of Superman #1 (March 1993) and was created by Karl Kesel and Walt Simonson.

== Fictional character biography ==
=== Lambien ===
Lambien, along with his twin brother, the first Citadelian, was born as a result of a Psion attempt to crossbreed the Okaaran X'Hal with a Branx warrior. A subsequent experiment gave X'Hal godlike powers which she used to escape and return to Okaara with her two sons.

As an adult, Lambien is among the leaders of the Vegan system, known as the Omega Men, who resist the Citadel. Lambien sacrifices himself to help the Omega Men get to safety. His body is placed in stasis and later reborn during a conflict between the Omega Men and the Gordanians. The reborn Lambien, now known as Auron, joins the Omega Men in their battles against the Citadel, but is manipulated by X'Hal, who forces him to kill and destroy at her command. Auron leaves the Omega Men after they are forced to fight each other and cause the dispersal of X'Hal's essence.

=== Jim Harper clone ===
Following the death of Superman, scientist Paul Westfield steals Superman's body for experimentation. After discovering he also needs a disc containing Superman's genetic information, Westfield creates a DNAlien clone of Jim Harper which he dubs Auron. Auron is ordered to retrieve the disc from other members of Project Cadmus, including Guardian, the Newsboy Legion, and Dubbilex. The Newsboy Legion convince Auron not to give Westfield the disc, and he subsequently leaves Earth.

Auron meets Superman in space near a Virago Cruiser to team up against Massacre. At first believing Superman is an imposter, the two fight until Superman convinces Auron he is the genuine article. During their fight with Massacre, Auron is hit by Massacre's energy blast and dies. Auron's jetpack falls into the possession of a merchant named Skimmer, who sells it to buy alcohol.

== Powers and abilities ==
The Lambien version of Auron has nearly god-like energy manipulation powers and a healing factor. He can fly fast and can survive unprotected in the vacuum of space.

The Jim Harper clone version of Auron has a jetpack containing a binary computer that is cyber-linked into his mind. He does not need to breathe, eat, or sleep because of the indestructible alloy that was bonded to his skin. This alloy also granted him enhanced durability and solar energy absorption.
