= Lana Lang =

Fictional DC Comics character

- Lana Lang in Superman (vol. 5) #20 (February 2020). Art by Ivan Reis.

Publication information
- Publisher: DC Comics
- First appearance: Superboy #10 (September/October 1950)
- Created by: Bill Finger (writer); John Sikela (artist)

In-story information
- Team affiliations: LexCorp
- Supporting character of: Superboy; Superman; Supergirl
- Notable aliases: Insect Queen, Superwoman
- Abilities: As Superwoman: Electro-magnetic energy manipulation, Flight; Superhuman strength; Superhuman speed; Superhuman stamina; Freeze breath; Heat vision; Invulnerability; Electric and magnetism Manipulation; “As insect queen" At First:

Lana Lang is a fictional character appearing in American comic books published by DC Comics. She is a Superman supporting character and love interest of the teenage Clark Kent. She was created by writer Bill Finger and artist John Sikela, and first appeared in Superboy #10 (September/October 1950). The character has occasionally gained superhuman powers and assumes the superhero identities of Insect Queen and Superwoman.

Lana has appeared in other-media adaptations of Superman, typically as a teenager. Film portrayals of the character include that by Diane Sherry in Superman: The Movie, Annette O'Toole in its sequel Superman III, and Jadin Gould in Man of Steel. She has been portrayed in television by Stacy Haiduk in Superboy, Emily Procter in Lois & Clark, Kristin Kreuk in Smallville, and Emmanuelle Chriqui in Superman & Lois.

== Publication history ==
Created by writer Bill Finger and artist John Sikela, the character first appears in Superboy #10 (September/October 1950). Across decades of Superman comics and adaptations into other media, Lana has most consistently been depicted as Superman's teenage romantic interest growing up in Smallville; as an adult, she is a friend of Superman in his civilian identity as Clark Kent.

Lana is one of many Superman characters with the alliterative initials "LL", the most notable other examples being Superman's primary love interest Lois Lane and archnemesis, Lex Luthor. In the Silver Age, she regularly appeared in comic books depicting the adventures of Superman's teenaged self, Superboy, and also appeared as an adult in numerous Superman titles, vying with Lois Lane for his attention. In modern revisions of DC Comics continuity, she and Clark are shown to have remained friends since their teenage years. The story varies across different revisions of Superman's origin story. For example, in Superman: Secret Origin, Lana becomes privy to Clark's unusual abilities at an early age and becomes his earliest confidant outside of his parents and the futuristic Legion of Super-Heroes.

== Fictional character biography ==
=== Silver Age and Bronze Age ===
==== Earth-One version ====
Lana Lang and Clark Kent. From The New Adventures of Superboy #3, March 1980. Art by Kurt Schaffenberger.

In the original Superboy stories, Lana was the girl who lived next door to the Kent family in Smallville, and was a romantic interest of Superboy. In the Silver Age stories, Lana often behaved like a younger version of Lois Lane, spending much of her time trying to prove that Superboy and Clark Kent were one and the same.

At one point, Lana once rescued an insect-like alien trapped by a fallen tree in Smallville. In gratitude, the alien gave her a "bio-genetic" ring which allowed Lana to gain insect (and insect-like, such as arachnids) characteristics. Lana created a yellow honeybee-like costume and mask, and took the name "Insect Queen", under which identity Lana had several adventures.

Lana also had various adventures with Superboy, and several with the futuristic superhero team the Legion of Super-Heroes. Also appearing in some Silver Age stories was Lana's uncle, Professor Potter, an eccentric inventor.

After Clark and Lana graduated from high school, Lana went to college, and eventually became a television reporter for Metropolis TV station WMET-TV. As an adult, Lana became a rival to Lois Lane for Superman's affection in various 1960s stories, often appearing in the Lois Lane comics series Superman's Girl Friend, Lois Lane.

During the 1970s and early 1980s, Lana became an anchorwoman for WGBS-TV's evening news in Metropolis, as a co-anchor to Clark Kent. Her attraction to Superman during this time had also died off, leaving Superman to Lois Lane. Lana later became romantically linked to the alien super-hero Vartox. Eventually, she and Clark Kent became romantically involved in stories prior to the Crisis on Infinite Earths.

==== Earth-Two version ====
In the early 1980s, with the use of the multiverse system DC had in place, Lana Lang was also shown in several stories to have had an Earth-Two counterpart (Earth-Two at the time the home of the Justice Society of America and DC's Golden Age versions of its characters, versus its mainstream universe of "Earth-One"). The Earth-Two Lana Lang was introduced in Superman Family #203. In this story, Lana Lang joins the Daily Star as a television critic. On Earth-Two Lana's father left Smallville and moved to Metropolis as a young man, so Clark did not know Lana in his youth.

Later, she became Insect Queen like her Earth-One counterpart; in this case, Lana had received a mystic amulet from her archaeologist father, the amulet having been created to allow a pharaoh to control and divert the locust hordes that threatened ancient Egypt. However, the sound of approaching insect wings was set to energize the charm associated with the amulet; by unfortunate coincidence, the sound of Superman's super-speed flying was similar enough to activate the spell. Lana was thus compelled to create a chitinous golden-brown costume (woven by silkworms under her control) and adopt a villainous alter ego, the Insect Queen. After an initial clash with Superman, the Insect Queen fell under the mental influence of Superman's enemy, the Ultra-Humanite, who kept her under the spell's compulsion and prevented her from reverting to normal. Earth-Two's Superman located an antidote to the spell, which Lois Lane used to remove the compulsion (Superman Family #213), letting Lana break free of Ultra's influence and making her able to use the amulet's power at her own discretion. The Earth-2 Insect Queen would later use her abilities to aid Superman in times of need. This version of Lana Lang was retconned out of existence after the events of Crisis on Infinite Earths.

=== Modern Age ===
After the 1985-1986 miniseries Crisis on Infinite Earths was written, various aspects of Lana's history were retconned, starting with comics writer John Byrne's miniseries The Man of Steel, which was designed to rewrite Superman's origin from scratch. In the post-Crisis version of events, Lana was a childhood friend of Clark, with a certain degree of romantic tension in the air as Lana had long pined after Clark, who had loved her only platonically in return.

After they graduated from high school Clark took Lana on a private walk, saying that he had to tell her something important, which Lana honestly expected to be a marriage proposal. He then divulged to her that he had superpowers, displayed by flying her around the world, before explaining that he felt he had to leave Smallville to help humanity as a whole. Kissing her goodbye "like a brother", Lana was left in considerable shock, not only over the revelation of Clark's superpowers, but also over the final realization that he held no reciprocal romantic feelings towards her, leaving Lana heartbroken and alone. When Lana finally aired her grievance with him years later (The Man of Steel #6), Clark felt very badly over how he had hurt her.

When Clark appeared in public as Superman some years later, the lonely and depressed Lana deduced his true identity and became something of a stalker, to the extent that Lex Luthor noticed the frequency with which she appeared in the vicinity of the hero and actually had her tortured in an attempt to gain whatever inside knowledge of Superman she might have. Lana bravely kept Clark's identity a secret and upon his rescuing her their relationship became more healthy once again, albeit still at a distance. A long-term conspiracy of the Oan-created androids, the Manhunters, from whose control Lana and the rest of Smallville's children born around the same time as her were eventually freed, proved to be the cause of this stalking. Unlike the pre-Crisis Earth-One continuity, Lana did not go on to have a journalistic career or compete with Lois for Superman's affections, nor play a significant role in Clark's life in Metropolis.

Lana's relationship with Clark is again altered in 2003's Superman: Birthright limited series by Mark Waid, which again revises Superman's origins. This storyline, which takes some inspiration from the TV show Smallville (such as the appearance of Jonathan and Martha Kent), also shows Clark and Lana to have had a mutual romantic relationship during their youth. At the start of the storyline, Lana has already left Smallville prior to Clark's return from his world journey. Upon his arrival home, Clark is told that Lana left some time prior and no one has heard from her since. Following this storyline, there is never again any mention of her history regarding Clark or Superman.

Lana's "Birthright" history was revised following the events of Infinite Crisis, which returned Clark's pre-Crisis Superboy alter-ego to continuity. In this new history, Lana's two brothers, whom she lacked in previous versions, often interrupted her romantic relationship with Clark. The full extent of her history and her connection to Superboy/Clark has not been fully disclosed. Again, her previous history has not been mentioned since this revision.

Years later, the post-Crisis Lana eventually married Pete Ross. The two settled into a quiet life in Smallville, where they had a son they named after their mutual friend, Clark. They picked this name for their son after Lana asked Clark to save his life when a car accident caused him to be born eight weeks premature. Although the attack of the Brainiac-controlled Doomsday interrupted Clark's efforts to take the baby to receive care, Brainiac's subsequent attempts to use the baby's DNA to create a new body for himself brought the baby to full term. Pete began a career in politics that got him elected to the Senate. In 2000, Senator Ross became Lex Luthor's vice presidential running mate in Luthor's bid to become President, and after the two won, Lana moved to Washington, D.C. Eventually, Luthor was forced from his office, and Pete Ross became President (and Lana the First Lady). As she and Pete began to drift apart, Lana began to subtly attempt to regain Clark's affections, much to the anger of his (now) wife Lois Lane. Pete and Lana briefly reunited after Superman saved them from a murder attempt by the villainous Ruin.

In Superman #654, Perry White reported that Lana had become CEO of Lexcorp following the ousting of founder Lex Luthor. In Superman/Batman #49, it is revealed that she sold Kryptonite to the government to prevent Lexcorp from going under and had caches of Kryptonite placed all over the planet, as a last-ditch defense if Superman should ever go rogue. When Superman and Batman come to remove the Kryptonite, Lana refuses to hand it over and pushes a button which turns the caches into "dirty bombs" which spread Kryptonite molecules through the entire planet, forcing all Kryptonians to vacate. However, Toyman uses special nanobots to remove all of the Kryptonite molecules, undoing the damage. Superman meets with Lana again, with Lana telling him she was left with no choice. Superman responds by telling her that, while he does sometimes wonder what things would have been like if he had married her rather than Lois, there is a reason he is with Lois instead of her: Lois would never have pushed the button. After Superman flies off, someone is shown watching Lana crying on a screen, saying to her "you did perfect". In Superman/Batman #63 suggests that this was Gorilla Grodd, when Batman mentions that "Grodd finally finished what he started when he controlled Lana all those years ago". However, this scenario is later revealed to be a simulation created in the Batcomputer.

She later tries to help Superman, facing the time-traveling strongman Atlas, by sending the Luthor Squad. This act activates a dormant program inside the Lexcorp mainframes, a holographic version of Luthor. The holographic copy of Luthor informs Lana that by helping Superman she has violated the Lexcorp standard contract of employment ("very, very fine print"), that forbids Lexcorp employees to use Lexcorp resources for helping Kryptonians, under the penalty of termination. Lana is given five minutes to leave the building, or they will shoot her to death.

In 2008, a new Supergirl writer Sterling Gates told Newsarama about Lana Lang: "We're integrating Supergirl's book more into the Superman universe, and that includes having a supporting cast that overlaps with that world. I'm very interested in tying her back in to Metropolis and making sure that her world is a part of the Superman universe. Cat Grant will be a regular supporting cast member, as will Lana Lang".

Lana takes it upon herself to reach out to Supergirl. She offers her advice and friendship. Around the same time, Perry White has been actively pursuing Lana to take over the Business section of the Daily Planet, a position which Lana was afraid to accept, following her bad experience with Lexcorp. Eventually, Lana and Supergirl decide together that Lana will accept the position, and that Supergirl will take on the secret identity of Linda Lang, niece of Lana Lang. Lana now lives in Metropolis with Supergirl, and is working as the editor of the Business section of the Daily Planet.

She briefly returns to Smallville to attend Jonathan Kent's funeral. However, unable to muster enough resolve to patch up things with Clark, Lana leaves before giving him her condolences.

While attending a student journalism award ceremony with Jimmy Olsen and Cat Grant, Lana suddenly collapses, with blood pouring out her nose. She receives a call from her doctor telling her that he has "bad news" for her. After Lana has another collapse, she is taken to the hospital and brought into surgery. She apparently dies on the operating table, but black insect-like creatures encase her body in a cocoon, which then starts to crack open. A gigantic cocoon-like structure soon engulfs the hospital, and an army of giant insects takes hostage a number of workers as well as the Science Police and the Guardian. Supergirl is soon captured and awakens bound and gagged at the feet of Lana, whom the Insect Queen now possesses. The Queen reveals to Supergirl that during her last encounter with Lana, she injected her with a portion of her DNA and has been slowly taking control of her body for the past year, with the ultimate goal of capturing a Kryptonian to use as a template for an army of hybrid insects. Supergirl breaks free and is able to expel the Queen from Lana's body with help from Kryptonian technology, and Lana returns to her normal state. While Lana is recovering, Supergirl visits her. Supergirl tells Lana she can no longer be a part of her family because of her lies about her condition. Lana and "Linda" have since reconciled and are currently living in the Hammersmith tower building in Metropolis.

=== The New 52 ===
In September 2011, DC Comics rebooted their continuity. In this new timeline, Lana is a childhood friend of Clark and has been privy to Clark's unusual abilities from an early age. They also share mutual romantic feelings for each other during their youth, and they would have gone to the Senior Prom together if that had not been the night that Clark's parents died. Lana eventually leaves Clark behind in Smallville to make her own mark on the world, but not before reassuring him that she will always love him. In the present day continuity, Lana works as an electrical engineer on various projects around the world. It is hinted that adult Clark still harbors romantic feelings for Lana.

In The New 52: Futures End, Lang was among the countless Earth 2 refugees who escaped Darkseid and his Parademon army's destruction of their home world and relocated to Prime Earth. Ending up working in the Cadmus Island sub-basement under King Faraday, Lana was able to conceal her metahuman biology from everyone, except Cole Cash. Lana and Cole eventually escaped the island together but were then forced to visit the Earth Registration Authority, where it was reported that Cole Cash had died nine years prior, forcing him to re-register under the legal name "Cole Lang" - Lana's husband and an Earth-2 native. Shortly afterwards, Lana adopted Susan Lang, formerly Fifty Sue, a super-powered little girl she had met on Cadmus Island.

=== DC Rebirth ===
In 2016, DC Comics started a company-wide crossover event titled DC Rebirth. A pre-Flashpoint Clark Kent discovered Lana under a memorial for Superman, where she revealed that she had made a promise to move Clark's remains next to his family's in Smallville. The pre-Flashpoint Clark had her take him to the Fortress of Solitude to see if he could revive Superman as he had assumed but realized that he could not. He then took Lana to Smallville and helped her to re-bury Superman's remains.

It is subsequently revealed that, apparently due to their presence at the death of the New 52 Clark Kent, Lana and Lois have acquired powers, each calling themselves 'Superwoman', with Lois demonstrating Superman's traditional powers while Lana manifests a form similar to the more recent 'Superman Red', able to absorb and generate multiple forms of energy. Although Lana initially plans to operate in secret, after Lois is killed, she begins taking on a more active role as Superwoman. She continues to operate as Superwoman but is ultimately de-powered and returns to normal life.

=== Dawn of DC ===
In the Dawn of DC series Steelworks, Lana Lang marries John Henry Irons and is exposed to zero-point energy that causes her to regain her powers.

== Other versions ==
- An alternate universe version of Lana Lang from Earth-31 appears in The Dark Knight Returns. This version is an editor at the Daily Planet.
- An alternate universe version of Lana Lang from Earth-3839 appears in Superman & Batman: Generations. This version is Superman's wife who became an immortal metahuman from constant exposure to magic and biochemicals.
- An alternate universe version of Lana Lang from Earth-898 appears in JLA: The Nail. This version is a doctor who studies metahumans.
- An alternate universe version of Lana Lang from Earth-30 appears in Superman: Red Son. This version is Lana Lazarenko, a Ukrainian woman and tour guide at a Superman museum.
- An alternate universe version of Lana Lang from Earth-10 appears in The Multiversity. This version is Overman's consort.
- An alternate universe version of Lana Lang appears in Superman: Year One.

== In other media ==
=== Television ===
==== Animation ====
Lana Lang, as she appeared in Superman: The Animated Series.

- Lana Lang appears in The Adventures of Superboy (1966), voiced by Janet Waldo.
- Lana Lang appears in Superman (1988), voiced by Russi Taylor as a young girl and by Liz Georges as a teenager.
- Lana Lang appears in series set in the DC Animated Universe, voiced by Kelley Schmidt as a teenager and by Joely Fisher as an adult. This version is a fashion designer who briefly dated Lex Luthor. First appearing in Superman: The Animated Series, she later makes a non-speaking cameo appearance in the Justice League episode "Hereafter" Pt. 2.
- Lana Lang makes a non-speaking cameo appearance in the Batman: The Brave and the Bold episode "Battle of the Superheroes!".

==== Live-action ====
Bunny Henning as Lana Lang (right) in The Adventures of Superboy.

Emily Procter as Lana Lang (left) in Lois & Clark: The New Adventures of Superman.

- Lana Lang appears in The Adventures of Superboy (1961), portrayed by Bunny Henning.
- Lana Lang appears in Superboy, portrayed by Stacy Haiduk. This version attended Shuster University and joined the Bureau for Extra-Normal Matters alongside Clark Kent.
- An alternate universe version of Lana Lang appears in the Lois & Clark: The New Adventures of Superman episode "Tempus, Anyone?", portrayed by Emily Procter. This version hails from a universe where Clark Kent and Lois Lane never met and he became engaged to Lana, who encourages him to keep his abilities secret out of fear that he will be captured and experimented on by the government. After the primary Lois travels to the alternate universe and convinces the alternate Clark to become Superman, Lana breaks up with him.
- Lana Lang appears in Smallville, portrayed by Kristin Kreuk. This version is Clark Kent's next-door neighbor and initially unaware of his affections for her. Throughout the series, they enter an on-off relationship until she gains superhuman abilities through a Kryptonite suit that renders her physically incompatible with Clark. Following this, she eventually leaves to use her powers for global humanitarian efforts.
- Lana Lang appears in Superman & Lois, portrayed by Emmanuelle Chriqui. This version initially works as a loan officer at a Smallville bank and a cheerleading coach, is married to fire chief Kyle Cushing, and has daughters named Sarah and Sophie. In the second season, Lana is elected mayor and discovers Superman's identity. In the third season, she divorces Kyle after discovering his infidelity during her campaign. In the fourth season, she opposes Lex Luthor's plans to build his new headquarters in Smallville and dates John Henry Irons, who she marries in the series finale.
  - Additionally, Chriqui also portrays an Inverse World version of Lana in the second season. This version was formerly a waitress before acquiring superpowers, is married to her version of Tal-Rho, and is an ally of Ally Allston's who is later defeated and arrested by the Department of Defense.

=== Film ===
==== Live-action ====
- Lana Lang appears in the Salkind Superman films. She first makes a cameo appearance in Superman (1978), portrayed by Diane Sherry, in which she is a cheerleader at Smallville High and in a relationship with a football player named Brad. Lang later appears in Superman III, portrayed by Annette O'Toole, in which she has had a son named Ricky and is divorced from her high school sweetheart Donald while Brad still vies for her attention despite her despising him.
- Lana Lang appears in films set in the DC Extended Universe. She appears as a child in a flashback in Man of Steel, portrayed by Jadin Gould, and in a cameo appearance as an adult in Batman v Superman: Dawn of Justice, portrayed by Emily Peterson.

==== Animation ====
- Lana Lang appears in Batman: The Dark Knight Returns, voiced by Paget Brewster. This version is a commentator and editor of the Daily Planet show Point vs Point.
- Svetlana, adapted from the source material's Lana Lang analog, Lana Lazarenko, appears in Superman: Red Son, voiced by Winter Ave Zoli. After befriending and convincing the young Kal-El to use his powers to help Russia, Svetlana is captured and imprisoned in a secret gulag by Joseph Stalin for knowing Kal-El's secret identity. By the time Superman locates and rescues her, she has been greatly weakened and dies in his arms.

=== Video games ===
- Lana Lang appears in DC Universe Online, voiced by Lorrie Singer.
- Lana Lang appears as a character summon in Scribblenauts Unmasked: A DC Comics Adventure.

== Reception ==
The character of Lana Lang has been analyzed as a portrayal of women in American comics. Her depiction in comics is seen in contrast to Lois Lane, in that "everything that woman are thought to be that the plot does not allow Lois spills over into Lana's character. Thus, the exaggeratedly feminine nature of Lana's speech and appearance- her form-fitting, sometimes revealing outfits for example- stands in contrast to Lois' sportier clothes and straightforward speech."
