= Kimiko Saitō =

Japanese voice actress and narrator (born 1977)

- 斉藤 貴美子
- Born: February 12, 1977 (age 49); Nagano Prefecture, Japan
- Occupations: Voice actress; narrator
- Years active: 2001–present
- Agent: Aoni Production

Kimiko Saitō (斉藤 貴美子, Saitō Kimiko; born February 12, 1977) is a Japanese voice actress and narrator from Nagano Prefecture. and is affiliated with Aoni Production. Some of her major voice roles are Rem in Death Note, Sister in Eden of the East, Chieko in Princess Jellyfish, Hiroko in Blue Drop and Big Madam in Tokyo Ghoul.

== Filmography ==
=== Television animation ===
- One Piece (1999), Gyoro, Boa Marigold, Catarina Devon, Acilia, Uhoricia, Charlotte Mondee
- Ultimate Muscle: The Kinnikuman Legacy (2002), Helga, Suzy
- Area 88 (2004), Alicia
- Kyo Kara Maoh! (2004), Tzo
- Tweeny Witches, Biris
- Basilisk: The Kouga Ninja Scrolls (2005), Ofuku/Lady Kasuga
- Ayakashi (2006), Obi
- Yu-Gi-Oh! 5D's (2008), Martha
- Welcome to the N.H.K. (2006), Misaki's Aunt
- Death Note (2006), Rem
- Kekkaishi (2006), Fuzuki
- Blue Drop: Tenshitachi no Gikyoku (2007), Hiroko Funatsumaru
- Higashi no Eden (2009), Sis
- Seikon no Qwaser (2010), Big Ma'am
- Bakugan: Gundalian Invaders (2010), Kazarina, Avior – Japanese dub
- Kuragehime (2010), Chieko
- The Devil Is a Part-Timer! (2013), Marie
- Tokyo Ghoul (2015), Big Madam
- Garo: Guren no Tsuki (2015), Suetsumuhana
- One-Punch Man (2015), Madame Shibabawa
- Dimension W (2016), Marie
- Mobile Suit Gundam: Iron-Blooded Orphans (2016), Arium Gyojan
- Overlord II (2018), Gagaran
- Skull-face Bookseller Honda-san (2018), Lantern
- Ace Attorney (2018), Harami Jōrōsu (Ep. 30)
- BNA: Brand New Animal (2020), Melissa Horner
- Golden Kamuy (2020), Sofia
- Wandering Witch: The Journey of Elaina (2020), (Former) Yaeba
- Insect Land (2022), Rafael
- Made in Abyss: The Golden City of the Scorching Sun (2022), Muugi
- Migi & Dali (2023), Micchan
- The Apothecary Diaries (2023), Madam
- Snack Basue (2024), Basue
- Pokémon Horizons: The Series (2024), Ryme
- Dragon Ball Daima (2024), Mini Mr. Popo
- I Left My A-Rank Party to Help My Former Students Reach the Dungeon Depths! (2025), Maniella
- Yaiba: Samurai Legend (2025), Fuji Mine

=== Original net animation ===
- Japan Sinks: 2020 (2020), Kirishima (ep. 6)
- The Way of the Househusband (2021), President

=== Original video animation ===
- Nana to Kaoru (2011) (Waka Sugimura)
- UQ Holder! OVA (2017) (Dana Ananga Jagannatha)

=== Theatrical animation ===
- Hunter × Hunter: The Last Mission (2013) (Milluki Zoldyck)

=== Tokusatsu ===
- Shuriken Sentai Ninninger (2015) (Yokai Yuki-onna)
- Kamen Rider Saber (2020) (Medusa Megid)

=== Video games ===
- Tales of Symphonia (2003) (uncredited)
- Soulcalibur III (2005) (Woman, Aurelia Dichalha Dolce Dalkia)
- Rune Factory Frontier (2008) (Stella)
- Yakuza 3 (2009) (Mitsuo)
- Super Smash Bros. Ultimate (2018) (Mii Fighters)
- The Legend of Heroes: Trails Through Daybreak II (2022) (Dominique Ranster)
- Hi-Fi Rush (2023) (Rekka)

=== Dubbing roles ===
==== Live-action ====
- And Just Like That... (Che Diaz (Sara Ramirez))
- Annie (Annie's "Mom" (Tracie Thoms))
- Breakthrough (Joyce Smith (Chrissy Metz))
- Bridesmaids (Megan Price (Melissa McCarthy))
- Caught Stealing (Det. Elise Roman (Regina King))
- City on a Hill (Grace Campbell (Pernell Walker))
- The Color Purple (Sofia (Danielle Brooks))
- Coming 2 America (Mary Junson (Leslie Jones))
- Criminal Minds (Penelope Garcia (Kirsten Vangsness))
- Criminal Minds: Suspect Behavior (Penelope Garcia (Kirsten Vangsness))
- The Darkest Minds (Lady Jane (Gwendoline Christie))
- Deadpool & Wolverine (Hunter B-15 (Wunmi Mosaku))
- The Dictator (Denise (Jessica St. Clair))
- Ender's Game (Major Gwen Anderson (Viola Davis))
- Get Smart (2011 TV Asahi edition) (Max's Dance Partner (Lindsay Hollister))
- Godzilla: King of the Monsters (Colonel Diane Foster (Aisha Hinds))
- The Heat (Detective Shannon Mullins (Melissa McCarthy))
- Jojo Rabbit (Fräulein Rahm (Rebel Wilson))
- The Karate Kid (Sherry Parker (Taraji P. Henson))
- The Kitchen (Kathy Brennan (Melissa McCarthy))
- A Minecraft Movie (Dawn (Danielle Brooks))
- Nobody's Fool (Tanya (Tiffany Haddish))
- Peacemaker (Leota Adebayo (Danielle Brooks))
- Ready Player One (Helen Harris / Aech (Lena Waithe))
- The Sisterhood of the Traveling Pants (Carmen Lowell (America Ferrera))
- The Sisterhood of the Traveling Pants 2 (Carmen Lowell (America Ferrera))
- Spell (Veora Woods (Lorraine Burroughs))
- Star Wars: The Force Awakens (Captain Phasma (Gwendoline Christie))
- Venom (Dr. Rosie Collins (Sope Aluko))
- Watchmen (Angela Abar / Sister Night (Regina King))
- Wonka (Piper Benz (Natasha Rothwell))
- Zack Snyder's Justice League (Philippus (Ann Ogbomo))

==== Animation ====
- The Bad Guys (Police Chief Misty Luggins)
- Fly Me to the Moon (Scooter)
- The Lego Movie 2: The Second Part (Queen Watevra Wa'Nabi)
- Onward (Specter)
- ParaNorman (Alvin)
- Shrek Forever After (Georgette)
- Star Wars Resistance (Captain Phasma)
