= Cameron Cuffe =

British actor

- Born: 5 April 1993 (age 33); Hammersmith, London, England
- Citizenship: Ireland; United Kingdom; United States
- Occupation: Actor
- Years active: 2014–present

Cameron Cuffe (born 5 April 1993) is a British actor. He is known for his roles as Gino in the film Florence Foster Jenkins (2016), William Shannon in the ITV series The Halcyon (2017), and Seg-El in the Syfy series Krypton (2018–2019).

== Early life ==
Cuffe was born in West London to an English mother and an American father of Irish and Italian descent. His Irish paternal family are from Waterford and Tramore. He spent some of his teen years in Boston. At 18 he moved to Ireland and went on to graduate with a Bachelor of Arts in Acting from The Lir Academy at Trinity College Dublin in 2014.

== Career ==
Cuffe began his professional career in London, appearing in the Park Theatre production of The Vertical Hour as Dennis Dutton and the Donmar Warehouse production of City of Angels as Peter Kingsley.

Cuffe appeared in the 2016 biographical film Florence Foster Jenkins and had a recurring role in the 2017 ITV drama series The Halcyon. After filming an episode of the 2017 ABC drama series Time After Time, Cuffe landed the lead role of Superman's grandfather Seg-El in the Syfy series Krypton, which premiered in March 2018. In 2022 Cuffe portrayed Patrick in Dolly Alderton's Everything I Know About Love for the BBC and Working Title as well as filming the 2024 adventure TV series Nautilus. In 2023 he returned to the stage in Dublin to play Brett in Nancy Harris's new play Somewhere Out There You at the Abbey Theatre.

== Acting credits ==
Film and television
Year	Title	Role	Notes	Ref.
2015	Home Made	Charity Man	Short film	
2016	Florence Foster Jenkins	Gino		
2017	The Halcyon	William Shannon	TV series (4 episodes)	
2017	Time After Time	Henry Ayers	TV series (Episode: "Picture Fades")	
2018–2019	Krypton	Seg-El	TV series (Main role); Nominated - Saturn Award for Best Performance by a Younger Actor in a Television Series (2019)	
2022	Everything I Know About Love	Patrick	TV series (Episode: 7)	
2024	Nautilus	Pitt	TV series	
2025	Hope Street	Donal Gallagher	TV series	

=== Video games ===
Video games
Year	Title	Role	Notes	Ref.
2016	Steep	Zack		
2017	Need for Speed Payback	Voice Talent		

=== Stage ===
Stage
Year	Title	Role	Location
2014	The Vertical Hour		Park Theatre, London
2014	City of Angels	Peter Kingsley	Donmar Warehouse, London
2023	Somewhere Out There You	Male Lead - Brett	Abbey Theatre, Dublin
