= Black Zero =

Black Zero is a name shared by two supervillains, two terrorist organizations, one special forces group, and a computer virus that have all appeared in various comic book series published by DC Comics.

== Fictional character biography ==
=== Original Black Zero ===
The original Black Zero solely appears in Superman #205 (1968), in a story entitled "The Man Who Destroyed Krypton" written by Otto Binder with artwork by Al Plastino. He is a space saboteur who destroys planets and was hired to destroy Krypton by maintaining pressure in its core.

In the present, Black Zero comes to Earth, threatening to destroy it as he did Krypton. In desperation, Superman releases Jax-Ur, a prisoner of the Phantom Zone, who wishes to avenge Krypton's destruction. After launching a missile toward Earth, Black Zero attacks Jax-Ur with red kryptonite, mutating him into a Gorgon-like form. Jax-Ur petrifies Black Zero with his gaze and shatters his body.

==== Powers and abilities of Black Zero ====
Black Zero has the ability to create "psycho-molecules" with his mind, which he can shape into any form of matter he chooses. His brain is fitted with a plastic coating, rendering him immune to hypnotism. He can make his body intangible, enabling him to pass through solid objects.

=== Black Zero organization ===
The first post-Crisis version of Black Zero appeared in the 1988 World of Krypton miniseries written by John Byrne and illustrated by Mike Mignola. Black Zero is initially depicted as a terrorist organization and later described as a "clone liberation movement".

During the Third Age of Krypton, the Kryptonian species extended their lives by maintaining clones in suspended animation, which they then harvested for body parts. Controversy emerged after one Kryptonian, named Nyra, removed one of her clones from stasis to have the clone marry her son. Her son killed the clone and Nyra, but was forcibly stopped from killing himself. After widespread public knowledge ensued concerning the fact that a clone had been able to achieve sentience, a thousand-long year war erupted. In their final act, Black Zero detonated a device that fired concentrated nuclear energy into Krypton's core. Though subsequently destroyed by Van-L, an ancestor of Jor-El, the Destroyer causes a chain reaction deep within Krypton that would, thousands of years later, obliterate the planet.

The name "Black Zero" was also used by a Kryptonian military force commanded by Ursa whose members were killed by Brainiac.

=== Computer virus ===
The Black Zero virus appeared in Superman Plus/Legion of Super-Heroes #1, a 1997 one-shot teaming Superman with the Legion of Super-Heroes. An intelligent computer virus created by the terrorist group, Black Zero is initially dormant in the Kryptonian technology used to create the Fortress of Solitude. After being inadvertently activated by Apparition, Black Zero puts Superman and the Legion through a warped version of Krypton's history, intending to finish with the destruction of Earth. It is halted when Brainiac 5 inadvertently causes a power outage and is subsequently removed from the Fortress' computers.

=== Black Zero (Superboy) ===
Black Zero
- Black Zero on the cover of Superboy #62 (1999). Art by Tom Grummett.

Publication information
- Publisher: DC Comics
- First appearance: Superboy (vol. 4) #61 (April 1999)
- Created by: Karl Kesel (writer); Tom Grummett (artist)

In-story information
- Alter ego: Experiment 13
- Species: Metahuman clone
- Place of origin: Earth of an alternate reality in Hypertime.
- Team affiliations: Fortress Cadmus
- Notable aliases: Superman
- Abilities: Advanced tactile telekinesis that provided flight, invulnerability, and superhuman strength; superhuman hearing and heat vision

The fourth Black Zero is an alternate version of Superboy from a reality in which Superman never returned from the dead after his battle with Doomsday. Instead of the Newsboy Legion releasing him prematurely, the clone undergoes a full artificial maturation process to match the age of the original and became the new Superman. However, he believes that he is perceived as a usurper and resented by the people for not being the original Superman. After a battle with Brainiac, Maxima, and Metallo leads to the deaths of Supergirl, Brainiac, and 318 civilians, a public backlash begins that leads to Project Cadmus being shut down.

After Guardian is killed by a mob, Superman retreats to the Fortress of Solitude and seeks guidance from Krypton's history. When he learns of the Black Zero clone liberation movement, he discards the name of Superman and assumes the mantle of Black Zero, intending to stop the anti-clone movement. Black Zero assumes control of Cadmus' remnants and creates clones of Guardian and many other heroes with the assistance of Dabney Donovan.

After conquering his Earth, Black Zero encounters the Challengers of the Unknown and learns of the multiverse. He "rescues" other worlds in which he feels that clones are being oppressed. The alternate universe counterparts of Superboy stand against Black Zero, leading him to store them in stasis chambers similar to the clone banks of Krypton.

Black Zero is eventually defeated by Superboy, the Challengers of the Unknown, and the alternate universe Superboys he had captured. After Metron sends the Superboys and Stormguards back to their own realities along with immobilizing Black Zero with a Mother Box, he provides a ship for the Challengers and Superboy to return home. Black Zero attacks the ship, but is engulfed by Hypertime energy and disappears.

==== Powers and abilities of Black Zero ====
Black Zero possesses a telekinetic force field that surrounds his body and allows him to simulate superhuman speed, strength, flight and invulnerability. Tactile telekinesis also allows him to disassemble machines and other complex constructions by touch. Unlike Superboy, Black Zero's field provides him with resistance to energy attacks and can be used to telekinetically immobilize others.

== In other media ==
=== Television ===
- The Black Zero terrorist organization appears in the Smallville episode "Kandor". This version of the group is infamous for destroying the eponymous city.
- The Black Zero terrorist organization appears in the first season of Krypton, led by Jax-Ur. They join forces with General Zod, among other Kryptonians, to foil Brainiac's plan to destroy Kandor until Zod betrays them, causing the group to disband.

=== Film ===
A Kryptonian prison frigate called the Black Zero appears in films set in the DC Extended Universe (DCEU):

- First appearing in Man of Steel, the Black Zero was designed by Jor-El to transport criminals to the Phantom Zone and was used to imprison General Zod and his battalion, the Sword of Rao. Following Krypton's destruction, the Sword of Rao repurposed the Black Zero as their command ship. They travel to Earth to retrieve the Growth Codex, but are defeated by Superman and returned to the Phantom Zone.
- The Black Zero appears in a flashback in Batman v Superman: Dawn of Justice.
- The Black Zero appears in The Flash.
