= Nautilus (TV series) =

2024 British adventure drama television series

- Release poster
- Genre: Adventure; Drama
- Created by: James Dormer
- Based on: Twenty Thousand Leagues Under the Seas by Jules Verne
- Directed by: Michael Matthews
- Starring: Shazad Latif; Georgia Flood; Thierry Frémont
- Composer: Nainita Desai
- Countries of origin: United Kingdom; Australia
- Original language: English
- No. of episodes: 10

Production
- Executive producers: Xavier Marchand; Anand Tucker; James Dormer; Johanna Devereaux; Chris Loveall; Michael Matthews; Colleen Woodcock; Daisy Gilbert
- Producer: Cameron Welsh
- Production location: Gold Coast, Queensland
- Production companies: Moonriver TV; Seven Stories

Original release
- Network: Amazon Prime Video
- Release: 25 October 2024

Nautilus is a ten-part adventure drama television series created by James Dormer. It is a reimagining of the 1870 novel Twenty Thousand Leagues Under the Seas by Jules Verne, presenting an origin story for Captain Nemo, an Indian prince-turned-crusading scientist.

In August 2023, after filming was complete, it was announced Disney+, the original distributor, would not release the series. In August 2024, Amazon Prime Video acquired the series for distribution in the United Kingdom and Ireland, where the series was released on 25 October 2024.

== Premise ==
The year is 1857, and the British East India Company currently wields more power than any nation on Earth, thanks to its private armies and navy, while stealing the riches of the nations they've subdued. In Kalpani, India, a massive submersible ship, the Nautilus, is being secretly built by the Company using slave labour from the Colonial prison. Although originally designed as a vessel of undersea exploration, the Company intends to arm the Nautilus and use it as a new type of warship. One of the prisoners forced to build the Nautilus is Nemo, who also designed the Nautilus's engines, but who has also been planning a prisoner uprising in order to seize the Nautilus and use it to escape. However, when plans are announced to have the Nautilus depart for Bombay days earlier than expected, Nemo and his followers still manage to successfully take over the Nautilus and escape out to sea. Now hunted by the East India Mercantile Company and its vengeful Director Crawley, both of whom want the Nautilus back and Nemo dead, Nemo and his motley crew sail beneath the seas on a mission of retribution and vengeance to utterly destroy the power of the Company...and the Company itself.

== Cast ==
=== Main ===
- Shazad Latif as Captain Nemo
- Georgia Flood as Humility Lucas
- Thierry Frémont as Gustave Benoit
- Pacharo Mzembe as Boniface
- Arlo Green as Turan
- Tyrone Ngatai as Kai
- Ling Cooper Tang as Suyin
- Andrew Shaw as Jiacomo
- Ashan Kumar as Ranbir
- Chum Ehelepola as Jagadish
- Céline Menville as Loti
- Cameron Cuffe as Lord Pitt
- Kayden Price as Blaster
- Damien Garvey as Director Crawley
- Benedict Hardie as Edward Cuff
- Jacob Collins-Levy as Captain Youngblood
- Luke Arnold as Captain Billy Millais
- Darren Gilshenan as Punch

=== Guest ===
- Richard E. Grant as the Maharajah of Karajaan
- Anna Torv as Revna
- Leeanna Walsman as Hilda
- Noah Taylor as Captain Mogg
- Muki Zubis as Casamir
- Adolphus Waylee as Absalom Boston
- Nicholas Hope as Dr Skinny

== Episodes ==
No.	Title	Directed by	Written by	Original release date
1	"Anahata"	Michael Matthews	James Dormer	June 12, 2024 (Sweden); October 25, 2024 (United Kingdom); June 29, 2025 (United States)
The East India Company secretly builds a powerful submarine (the Nautilus) with the labor of Indian prisoners. Director Crawley arrives and informs the craft's architect, Benoit, that the vessel will be used as a war machine for the company. Nemo, a mysterious prisoner who perfected Benoit's blueprints, takes Crawley hostage. In the fight to escape aboard the submarine, Nemo's best friend Aadesh is fatally shot. Shortly after reaching open water, Nemo uses the Nautilus to ram and sink a ship of the Company, but is forced to take in Humility Lucas, her maid Loti, and Blaster, a cabin boy. Nemo then sets Crawley and the ship's surviving crew adrift. Crawley swears to hunt Nemo to the ends of the earth. The voyage of the Nautilus continues, but the engine fails, damaged by the attack, causing the craft to rapidly sink, threatening its crew with implosion.
2	"Tick, Tick, Boom"	Michael Matthews	James Dormer	June 12, 2024 (Sweden); October 25, 2024 (United Kingdom); June 29, 2025 (United States)
As the Nautilus rapidly sinks toward imminent destruction, Nemo agrees to Humility's desperate plan of diverting the breathing air into the ballast tanks to enable the ship to resurface. The attempt is successful, but while Benoit attempts to repair the engines, Humility, Loti, and Blaster escape and swim toward shore. An attack by East India Company soldiers forces them to return to the Nautilus. Meanwhile, Crawley engages Captain Youngblood to assume command of the Dreadnought, a prototype battlecruiser. Nemo takes compassion on a mother whale leading a crew of whalers away from her calf, and surfaces to cut her free, then bribes the whalers to spare the rest of the pod with Humility's jeweled bracelet. The Nautilus submerges as the Company overtakes it, but the Dreadnought bombards them with underwater explosives. As Nemo and the crew attempt to evade them by diving out of range, an unknown sea-creature is awakened by the explosions and stirs in the shadows.
3	"What Lies Beneath"	Michael Matthews	Matthew Parkhill	June 19, 2024 (Sweden); October 25, 2024 (United Kingdom)
The Nautilus is attacked by a giant squid and rendered helpless in the creature's tentacles until the mother whale Nemo saved from the whalers comes to its rescue. The Dreadnought searches for the Nautilus's position with sonar, but Nemo fires a torpedo to create a distraction, and the submarine escapes while the Company chases it. Nemo docks the Nautilus at Karajan, an island unfriendly to the Company, and is greeted by the Rajah, who recognizes him as Prince Dakkar. The Rajah offers to provide passage to America for Humility and reveals that Nemo's wife and daughter were murdered by the Company, hence his crusade for vengeance. Nemo discovers that Rajah has telegraphed the Dreadnought, and is rescued when Jagadish, one of his crewmen, inspires a native uprising. Humility finally decides to trust Nemo, and our heroes fight their way back to Nautilus, only for Jagadish to be wounded and captured by the Company as the Dreadnought blocks the Nautilus from escaping the shallow harbor.
4	"Slippery When Wet"	Michael Matthews	Sian Ejiwunmi-Le Berre	June 19, 2024 (Sweden); October 25, 2024 (United Kingdom)
Nemo risks his life to swim across and sabotage the Dreadnought long enough for the Nautilus to slip past. Kai brings him back aboard, and the crew set sail for a mysterious island to reprovision. Meanwhile, Director Crawley murders Rajah for failing to deliver the Nautilus, and resumes the chase on the open sea. On the island, Nemo, Humility, and Blaster discover a band of shipwrecked Company sailors led by Captain Henry Mogg, who have degenerated into a savage lifestyle and formed a liaison with a mysterious water-beast. Our heroes are joined by Casimir, a castaway who disguised herself as a man to survive at sea. Blaster is captured by the Moggs, who attempt to sacrifice him to the beast (revealed to be a gigantic electric eel) in exchange for fresh water. Nemo and Humility distract the Moggs long enough for Casimir to rescue Blaster, then flee as the eel devours Captain Mogg and pursues them on the land. Our heroes return to the Nautilus, but Casimir refuses to enter, and is swallowed by the eel, which drags the submarine into the depths and attacks them with its electricity, rendering them helpless.
5	"Hallucinations"	Ben C. Lucas	Sonya Desai	June 26, 2024 (Sweden); October 25, 2024 (United Kingdom)
Humility advises a countercharge of 1500 volts to repel the eel, but Nemo and Benoit order her to stay below 1000. Scornful of their distrust, she lies and raises the voltage to 1500, with the result of shorting out the Nautilus. Paralyzed by her miscalculation, she gives into her despair. Meanwhile, a bacteria picked up on the island begins rapidly spreading through the crew, causing vivid hallucinations and unconsciousness. The Nautilus sinks toward an underwater volcano that is part of the Ring of Fire. The heat causes the eel to leave them, but a torn off portion its dorsal fin jams the rudder, preventing escape. The last of the crew succumbs to the bacteria, which is nourished by the heat, forcing Humility to overcome her fears and climb outside the submarine in a diving suit to repair the rudder. She succeeds, causing the Nautilus to start up again, but is thrown helpless into the abyss.
6	"The Big Blue"	Ben C. Lucas	Sian Ejiwunmi-Le Berre	June 26, 2024 (Sweden); October 25, 2024 (United Kingdom)
Once clear of the heat of the volcano, the bacteria subsides, and the crew recovers. Before passing out, Humility glimpses a manmade structure underwater. Nemo brings her in, and she is revived. When Benoit hears of what she saw, he realizes that they have found the location of Atlantis, which matches an ancient chart he found in the Karajan library. He begs Nemo for a chance to explore, but Nemo is initially resistant, until Benoit reminds him that the true purpose of the submarine is to experience the marvels of the deep, not to pursue revenge. Our heroes suit up and discover an air pocket which allows them to explore the ruins without helmets. Benoit separates from the group and discovers a mysterious glowing rock. Our heroes are attacked by hostile crinoids. Humility and Cuff fight their way past sharks to return to the Nautilus, and Nemo attempts to rescue Benoit, who passes on the rock before being engulfed by the crinoids. Aboard the Nautilus, a mournful Nemo reflects on Benoit's view of the ocean. Meanwhile, Millais forces Jagadish to reveal the destination of the Nautilus (the sunken treasure-trove of Halvar) before executing Jagadish. The Company realizes that Nemo plans to cut through the Arctic Circle to reach Halvar, and scheme to cut him off.
7	"Cold War"	Ben C. Lucas	Matthew Parkhill	July 3, 2024 (Sweden); October 25, 2024 (United Kingdom)
Pursued by the Dreadnought into arctic waters, Nemo plans to lure the Company ironclad into being grounded on the ice, but a broken engine part causes the Nautilus to be caught in the same predicament. Nemo makes a deal with Captain Youngblood: if the Nautilus crew is allowed to use the Dreadnought's forge to repair the broken part, the Nautilus will tow the ironclad off the ice; in addition, Humility and Blaster will be allowed to leave the Nautilus. Humility eventually brings the broken part aboard the Dreadnought, where she meets her intended husband Lord Pitt. As tensions grow between the two crews, a cricket match is proposed. A penalty against Pitt causes a fistfight between the two teams and an end to the match. Millais tells Nemo the real reason why Nemo's father surrendered his lands to the Company, and Pitt spitefully tells Blaster that the latter's father is not nobility and Humility that her mother practically sold her to Pitt in exchange for funds to keep her late husband's business going. Humility and Loti escape from the Dreadnought with the repaired part and rejoin the Nautilus with Blaster. Pitt opens fire on the Nautilus.
8	"The Tipping Point"	Isabelle Sieb	James Dormer	July 3, 2024 (Sweden); October 25, 2024 (United Kingdom)
Nemo's crew is distrustful of Nemo's reckless decision to take the Nautilus directly beneath the ice with an insufficient oxygen supply. Incensed by the increasing tyranny of his command, they mutiny, and confine Nemo to his cabin while Boniface assumes command. Humility visits Nemo and encourages him to open up and work with his crew instead of using them. The Nautilus reaches magnetic north and sinks to the ocean floor with a leak when its instruments fail. Jiacomo enters Nemo's cabin to free him, but Nemo misreads his intent and attacks him. Jiacomo overpowers Nemo, but hesitates, allowing his opponent to restrain him in turn. Nemo escapes from his cabin, suits up, and examines the leak from the outside, to discover that a metal-eating life-form has eaten its way into the hull. Nemo and the mutineers forge a truce to launch the queen of the swarm out of the ship so that the rest will follow. The crew then discovers that the Nautilus is balanced precariously on the edge of a deep chasm, and retreat to the stern to avoid tipping over. Nemo glimpsed algae while outside, and realizes that there must be a current below, which would carry them to safety. He finally trusts his shipmates, whose trust in him is restored, and they come over to his side one by one, acknowledging his command, and tip the submarine off the precipice and into the current, which carries them to freedom.
9	"Ride of the Valkyrie"	Isabelle Sieb	Matthew Parkhill	July 10, 2024 (Sweden); October 25, 2024 (United Kingdom)
The Nautilus leaves Arctic waters and sets course for the Pillars of Halvar, where they are first greeted by the ominous warning of skulls on spikes. The submarine enters a lagoon and anchors underwater. Nemo leaves Suyin and Blaster on guard, then leads a diving party to the sunken Viking ship, which proves to be loaded with empty chests. While a baffled Nemo searches for any trace of the treasure, he and his comrades are ambushed by Valkyrie guardians and brought prisoner to the surface. Nemo discovers that the treasure is ceremonially integrated into the structure of the mountain citadel and realizes that the sunken ship was a trap for looters. The Valkyries put Nemo on trial for plundering, but although Humility advocates for the defendant's good character and pure motives, their captors decide that the secrecy of their civilization is all that matters and prepare to execute the captives. The Nautilus crew breaks free and battles the Valkyries hand to hand before diving off a precipice into the ocean. Nemo snatches a valuable ruby from the Valkyrie leader but loses it while saving Cuff from drowning. The Valkyries decide to free themselves from their oath of guardianship by hiding the treasure for real and activate a mechanism which causes the cove to collapse. The Nautilus narrowly escapes back to open water, and a disillusioned Nemo is resolved to disband the crew out of guilt for risking their lives for nothing, until Ranbir reminds the crew that the Company must be destroyed not only for personal grievances, but to protect others who suffer the same oppression. Nemo's plan to wreck the Company will not work without funding, so Turan donates a diamond from the cover of his poetry book. Meanwhile, Director Crawley anticipates Nemo's arrival in London, and deploys a massive garrison to guard the Company headquarters, only to overlook a third-class vagabond in the shadows, who proves to be Nemo spying in disguise.
10	"Too Big to Fail"	Isabelle Sieb	James Dormer	July 10, 2024 (Sweden); October 25, 2024 (United Kingdom)
To execute Nemo's scheme, the Nautilus crew circulate rumors on the London streets that the Company is secretly bankrupt, while acquiring the shares of major shareholders. While stealing a large collection of shares from a secret laboratory, Jiacomo encounters a mad scientist who appears to know his identity (Jiacomo has no memory of his past) and chooses to stay behind to give Boniface a chance to escape. Crawley convenes a meeting of the Company to reassure the public. The assembly is astonished when Captain Nemo steps forward and challenges him openly. One by one, the crew of the Nautilus reveal that they are the majority of shareholders, with enough power to vote a new chairman into position. Nemo is elected chairman and moves to dissolve the company, then forces Crawley to sign an order to dismantle all Company prison camps. The crew then burn all the vile ledgers in the Company archive. Humility confesses her feelings for Nemo, who remorsefully orders her to stay behind in London, since the crew of the Nautilus will now be fugitives from the entire British empire. Heartbroken, Humility departs. Alone, Nemo discovers the execution order for his family, signed by none other than Millais, who appears to kill Nemo at long last. The enemies engage in a deadly swordfight, but Nemo leaves Millais alive. Lord Pitt abducts Humility with intent to finally force her into marriage, but Loti appears and knifes him in the foot. The duo rush to rejoin the Nautilus, which narrowly escapes by destroying a bridge, preventing the Dreadnought from following. Captain Youngblood is shot by Crawley for interfering, but Crawley is murdered in turn by Cuff, who has stayed behind to ally himself with the British Government, who plans to build a second submarine with Benoit's blueprints. Humility arrives too late. Nemo compares a stone he found in the archive with the one Benoit gave him before his death, and is amazed when they glow on contact, giving him a vision of Benoit alive. Nemo goes to the bridge and gives his crew their new heading: Atlantis.

== Production ==
=== Development ===
In August 2021, it was announced that Disney+ had ordered Nautilus, a ten-part television series about the origin of Captain Nemo and his submarine, the Nautilus. James Dormer writes the series, based off a treatment by Mark Stay, and also serves as executive producer with Xavier Marchand, Anand Tucker and Johanna Devereaux. Moonriver TV and Seven Stories produce the series. Michael Matthews joined as director in November 2021. Cameron Welsh joined as series producer and Chris Loveall joined as executive producer in February 2022; Colleen Woodcock and Daisy Gilbert were added as executive producers one year later.

=== Casting ===
Shazad Latif was cast as Captain Nemo in November 2021. In February 2022, Georgia Flood, Thierry Frémont, Pacharo Mzembe, Arlo Green, Tyrone Ngatai, Ling Cooper Tang, Andrew Shaw, Ashan Kumar, Chum Ehelepola, Céline Menville, Kayden Price, and Damien Garvey were cast. In May 2022, Richard E. Grant joined the cast as a guest star. Muki Zubis, Benedict Hardie, Jacob Collins-Levy, Adolphus Waylee, Cameron Cuffe and Luke Arnold also joined the cast.

=== Filming ===
Filming began in mid-February 2022 at Village Roadshow Studios in Gold Coast, Queensland. The series was expected to wrap in January 2023. The series filmed at The Old Museum in Brisbane in May 2022, and at the Queensland Parliament House in September. Filming was previously set to begin in December 2021. Ben C. Lucas directed episodes 5, 6, and 7, while Isabelle Sieb directed 3 episodes of the series.

== Release ==
Nautilus is distributed worldwide by Disney Entertainment. The series was originally slated to be released on Disney+ in the United Kingdom before it was announced that it would not be moving forward with the series. It first aired on SVT Play in Sweden on 12 June 2024.

In August 2024, Amazon Prime Video acquired the series for release in the United Kingdom and Ireland, where it premiered on 25 October 2024. All episodes were released simultaneously. In other European countries, the full series was released on 18 October 2024. (Except in France, where it was released on 12 August 2024, on France 2 channel)

In September 2024, Stan announced that it had acquired the series for Australia, where it was released on 25 October 2024.

In October 2023, AMC announced it had acquired the series for broadcast in the United States and Canada, where it premiered on 29 June 2025.

== Reception ==
In the United Kingdom, the series had topped Amazon Prime's chart in its debut week, according to the director of the last three episodes in October 2024. In the United States, the series debuted with 2.6 million viewers in June 2025, making it AMC's most‑watched premiere since The Walking Dead: The Ones Who Live (2024).

The review aggregator website Rotten Tomatoes reports a 79% "fresh" approval rating based on 14 reviews. Metacritic, which uses a weighted average, assigned a score of 65 out of 100 based on 13 critics, indicating a "generally favorable" reception.

== See also ==
- List of underwater science fiction works
