= Krypton (comics) =

Fictional planet, native world of Superman

- Krypton as depicted in The Man of Steel (vol. 2) #1 (May 2018). Art by Joe Prado and Ivan Reis.
- First appearance: Action Comics #1 (June 1938); Named: Superman #1 (June 1939)
- Created by: Jerry Siegel; Joe Shuster
- Genre: Superhero comics

In-universe information
- Type: Planet
- Race: Kryptonians
- Locations: Argo City; Kandor; Kryptonopolis; Vathlo Island
- Publisher: DC Comics

Krypton is a fictional planet appearing in American comic books published by DC Comics, most commonly appearing or mentioned in stories starring the superhero Superman as the world from which he came. The planet was created by Jerry Siegel and Joe Shuster, and was named after the chemical element krypton. It was first mentioned in Action Comics #1 (June 1938) and made its first appearance in Superman #1 (June 1939). Krypton is destroyed immediately after Superman, as the baby Kal-El, is sent from the planet in a spacecraft by his parents, although the exact details of its destruction have varied over publication history.

The planet is portrayed as having been far more technologically advanced than Earth, and having orbited a red sun. Kryptonians were the dominant species on Krypton, and its inhabitants included Kara Zor-El, Krypto, Beppo, Kara Zor-L (in her case, an alternate-universe version designated "Krypton-Two"), and the supervillain General Zod.

Krypton appears in several television series such as Adventures of Superman, Lois & Clark: The New Adventures of Superman, Superman: The Animated Series, Smallville, Supergirl, Krypton and My Adventures with Superman. It also appears in the films Superman (1978), Man of Steel (2013) and Supergirl (2026).

== Overview ==
Krypton is usually portrayed in comics as the home of a fantastically advanced civilization, which is destroyed when the planet explodes. As originally depicted, all the civilizations and races of Krypton were killed in the explosion, with one exception: the baby Kal-El who was placed in an escape rocket by his father, Jor-El, and sent to the planet Earth, where he grew up to become Superman.

The bottled city of Kandor in Action Comics #866; art by Gary Frank and Jon Sibal.

In some versions of the story, additional survivors were later discovered, such as Supergirl, her parents (kept alive in the "Survival Zone", a similar parallel "dimension" to the Phantom Zone), the criminal inhabitants of the Phantom Zone, Dev-Em, the residents of the bottled city of Kandor, the real parents of both Superman and Supergirl, and their pets Krypto the Superdog, and Beppo the Super-Monkey. Kandor, the first capital of Krypton, is miniaturized by Brainiac, but is recovered by Superman and housed in the Fortress of Solitude for safekeeping. Soon afterward, Kryptonopolis becomes the second capital of Krypton.

From the late 1980s through the early 2000s, the number of survivors was reduced to Superman himself in the comic book stories (the Eradicator was added in 1989 as a non-sentient device, and shown to be self-aware in 1991), but more recent accounts have restored Supergirl, Krypto, and Kandor and introduced another newly discovered survivor, Karsta Wor-Ul.

Kryptonian civilization's reported level of technological advancement has also varied. Some works, such as Kevin J. Anderson's novel The Last Days of Krypton, describe it as a few centuries ahead of Earth, while others, such as the Superman film series and Man of Steel, describe it as thousands or even hundreds of thousands of years more advanced.

== Versions of Krypton ==
=== Krypton in the Golden Age of Comic Books ===
==== History ====
Krypton's apocalyptic end in Action Comics #1 (June 1938), art by Joe Shuster.

In its first appearance, Krypton was only depicted at the moment of its destruction. Beginning in the Superman comic strip, Krypton was shown to have been a planet similar to Earth, only older by eons and possessed of all the progress that implied. It is suggested that Krypton exploded due mainly to old age and the massive use of electricity Kryptonians used for their technology.

The debut of the Superman newspaper comic strip in 1939 delved into further details about Krypton, introducing the idea that all Kryptonians possessed a level of heightened physical abilities, including superhuman strength and speed. In the early comics' version of Krypton, Superman's parents were named Jor-L and Lora, though their names were changed to the more familiar Jor-El and Lara by the end of the 1940s.

After the introduction of DC's multiverse in the 1960s, this version of Krypton was declared to be the Krypton of the Earth-Two universe; the native dimension of DC's Golden Age characters and its Superman. Power Girl (Kara Zor-El) was introduced as the Earth-Two version of Supergirl in 1976.

==== Krypton in transition ====
Over the course of the 1940s and 1950s, various alterations and additions to the makeup of Krypton were made in the comics. Among them was an explanation of why the natives of Krypton were killed if they had possessed superpowers on their native world. Thus, it was explained by the early 1950s that Kryptonians were powerless on their own planet and would gain superpowers only within a lower gravity environment. This matched contemporary theories that humans would be able to lift greater masses and leap greater distances on the Moon than on Earth due to its lesser gravity. In the early 1960s, it was explained that Kryptonians derived their powers from the light of a yellow sun. Under a red sun such as that of Krypton, Kryptonians have no powers.

=== Krypton in the Silver Age of Comic Books ===
By the late 1950s, Krypton played an increasing role in various Superman stories, with greater detail provided about Krypton's makeup. Superman's Kryptonian heritage was a frequent factor in Silver Age Superman comic storylines, as he was fully aware of his origins from an early age. Superman would use this knowledge for such tasks as constructing advanced Kryptonian technology or observing some of Krypton's traditions.

==== History ====
Map of Krypton

Kryptonians made use of their advanced science to create a world where scientific inventions and research influenced much of daily life. Robots and computers were used for many tasks on Krypton, even for determining what career paths young Kryptonians would take as they grew up. Scientific and technological research were highly valued on Krypton, with the ruling body of Krypton named the Science Council.

Several stories featured characters traveling back in time to visit Krypton before its destruction; one example is the 1960 story "Superman's Return to Krypton", in which Superman is swept back in time to Krypton years before its destruction. Powerless, he spends some time on the planet, where he meets his future parents-to-be and falls in love with Kryptonian actress Lyla Lerrol. A Superman "imaginary story" entitled "What If Krypton Had Not Exploded?" gave more insight into Krypton's society. This era also established that the Guardians of the Universe, the administrators of the Green Lantern Corps, were aware of Krypton's pending destruction and assigned Green Lantern Tomar-Re to avert it, but he was unsuccessful due to being blinded by a solar flare.

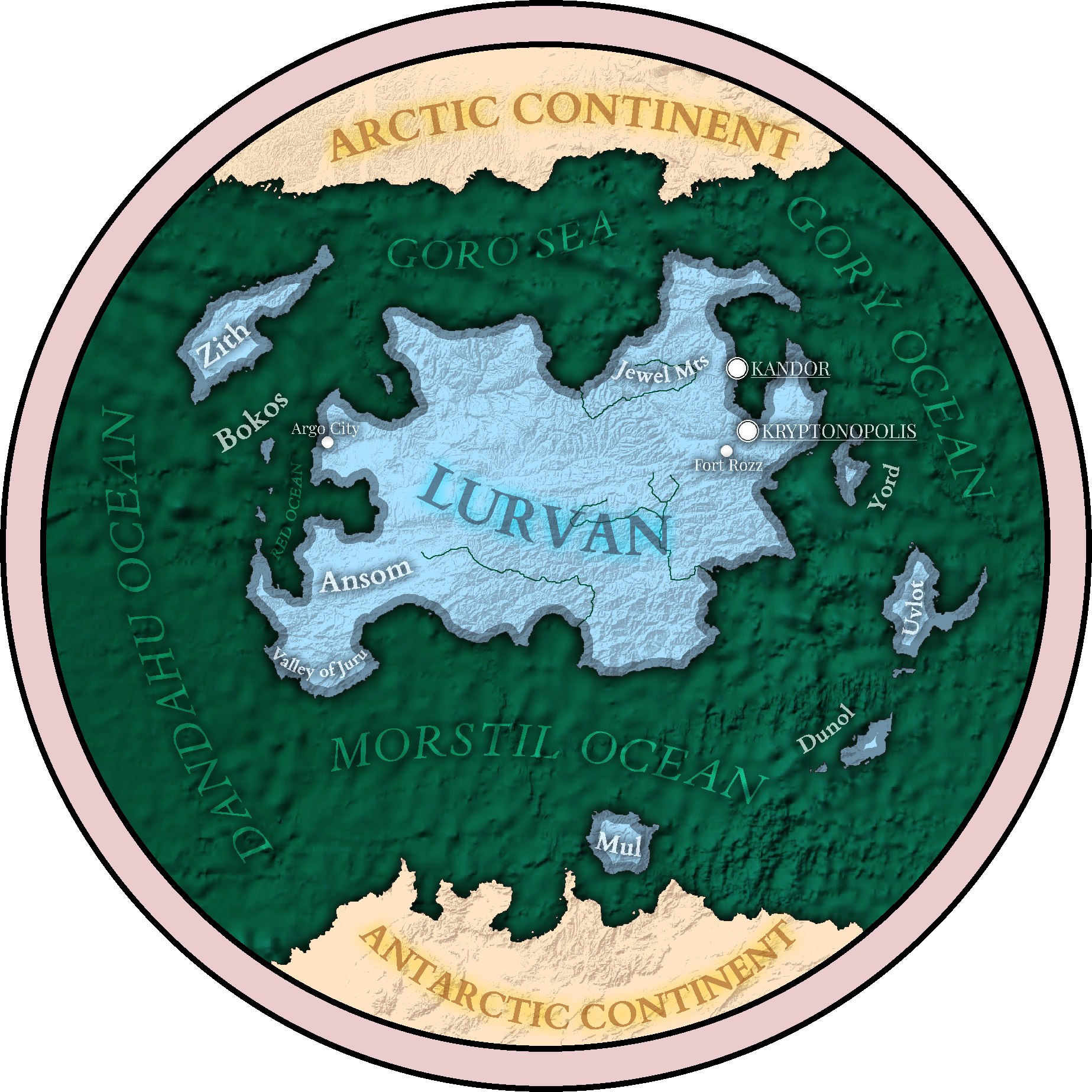
Detailed map of Krypton

In 1980, a three-issue miniseries titled World of Krypton was published, providing a great amount of detail into Krypton's history just before its destruction, along with the life story of Jor-El himself. A three-issue miniseries entitled The Krypton Chronicles, published in 1981, tells of Superman researching his roots when, as Clark Kent, he was assigned to write an article about Superman's family. To do so, he and Supergirl travel to Kandor, where they learn the history of the El family. In 1985, writer Alan Moore gave a darker glimpse into the world of Krypton in his story "For the Man Who Has Everything" (in Superman Annual #11), which takes place in a dream world where Krypton was not destroyed.

==== Flora and fauna ====
Krypton has a vast number of flora and fauna, both wild and domesticated. Some of them look very similar to Earth's animals, due to parallel evolution, e.g., birds, felids, canids, simians, etc., as seen in Krypto and Beppo; while others look very different, due to divergent evolution, e.g., fish/snake/eel-like hybrid creatures called "fish-snakes", goat-like creatures called "Zuurt", bovine-like creatures called "Rondor", rhinoceros/ceratopsian-like creatures called Thought-Beasts, dragon-like creatures called H'Raka, pterodactyl-like creatures called "War-Kites", gigantic, one-horned snake-like creatures called "Drang", and jellyfish-like invertebrate creatures called Shoggoth.

==== Moons ====
One of Krypton's moons, Wegthor, was accidentally destroyed by Jax-Ur, a scientist who was experimenting with a nuclear missile that was diverted from its intended destination. The disaster killed 500 inhabitants of the moon, resulting in Jax-Ur being the first criminal banished to the Phantom Zone. This disaster also prompted the Science Council of Krypton to ban space flight completely.

==== Survivors ====
A Silver Age Superman was not alone in the survival of Krypton's destruction, being joined by his cousin Supergirl, the Phantom Zone criminals, Krypto the Superdog, Beppo the Super-Monkey, juvenile delinquent Dev-Em, the entire population of the city of Kandor, and Supergirl's biological parents. When the planet exploded, one entire city of Krypton, Argo City, survived the cataclysm.

Argo City drifted through space on an asteroid-sized fragment of Krypton, which had been transformed into kryptonite by the explosion. The super-advanced technology of its Kryptonian inhabitants allowed them to construct a life-sustaining dome and a lead shield that protected their city from the kryptonite radiation of the asteroid. The protective shield was destroyed in a meteor storm, exposing the inhabitants to kryptonite radiation.

The sole survivor of Argo City, Kara Zor-El, was sent to Earth by her scientist father to live with her cousin Kal-El, who had become known as Superman. Kara adjusted to her new life on Earth and became known as Supergirl. It was later discovered that Supergirl's parents had survived in the Survival Zone, a parallel dimension similar to the Phantom Zone, from which she released them. When Kandor was finally enlarged on a new planet that was similar to Krypton, Supergirl's parents joined its inhabitants to live there.

==== Daxamites ====
The people now known as the Daxamites were originally Kryptonians who left their homeworld to explore the universe. In post-Crisis on Infinite Earths continuity, the Eradicator, an artificial lifeform programmed to preserve all Kryptonian culture, altered the birthing matrices ("artificial wombs") that the explorers took with them so that all newborns would be fatally vulnerable to lead and other materials such as greenhouse gases and certain rocks. Thus, if they persisted in their anti-Kryptonian wanderlust, they would all die from it. One Daxamite, Mon-El, was poisoned by lead and preserved in the Phantom Zone until Brainiac 5 found a cure in the 30th century, whereafter Mon-El became a member of the Legion of Super-Heroes.

==== Vathlo Island ====
Vathlo Island
- Superman location
- Vathlo Island, from map of Krypton in Superman #239 (Sal Amendola, artist).
- First appearance: Superman #239 (June/July 1971)
- Created by: Sal Amendola
- Genre: Superhero comics

In-universe information
- Type: Island continent
- Race: Kryptonians
- Character: Iph-Ro
- Publisher: DC Comics

Vathlo Island is a fictional location on Krypton, notable as an early attempt to explain in-universe the seeming non-presence of black people throughout the universe. Other scholars have called Vathlo Island out more broadly as a stand-in for different non-white diaspora communities, such as Hispanic and Latino Americans.

In issue #234 of Superman (February 1971), the first apparently dark-skinned Kryptonian was featured, and described as being employed at "Vathlo Station", but the origin of this previously unseen Kryptonian ethnicity otherwise went uncommented on.

Half a year later, in Superman #239 (June 1971), a panel drawn by artist Sal Amendola described a "Vathlo Island" in the "Old World" hemisphere of Krypton as being populated by a "highly developed black race".

DC generally lagged behind its competitor Marvel Comics, and Superman comics generally more so than other DC titles, in depicting characters of color, and there were few previous appearances of black characters in the series, mostly stereotypical "natives". It is unknown who exactly was responsible for introducing these first nonwhite races to Krypton's demographic makeup, but Mark Waid has speculated that it was E. Nelson Bridwell, editorial assistant on the Superman books at the time. The commentary on the Vathlorians being "highly developed" (as if it were peculiar and noteworthy that people with dark skin might be developed) is generally seen by modern commentators as well-intended but "cringeworthy".

Other commentators have noted that the creation of Vathlo Island inspired a whole host of other questions, such as 'If there are black Kryptonians, why are they so seldom seen, and why do they appear to live only on one island?' Gizmodo noted that a Krypton structured this way seems "segregated as hell", while Gene Demby observed that this was an example of "segregation in everything". DC Comics writer Mark Waid called this an "error of omission" coming from DC's desire to represent people of darker skin as living on Krypton, but implementing this in a way with unintended implications. However, other writers have pointed out that DC would go on to re-use this as a rationale to explain the non-presence of black-skinned characters in other contexts, as with Tyroc.

Vathlo was rarely if ever referenced beyond these few issues, although a black Kryptonian named "Iph-Ro of Vathlo" appeared in the more recent Superman: The Man of Steel #111. An offhand reference to the island was made in Alan Moore's story "For the Man Who Has Everything", where "racial trouble with the Vathlo Island immigrants" are mentioned in a dream-world Krypton that had avoided destruction. It is believed, based on the appearances of black Kryptonians in recent Superman issues, that the Vathlonians eventually were integrated into Krypton proper, although there has been no canonical statement about this from DC Comics.

In Final Crisis #7 a black version of Superman is shown to reside on the alternate universe of Earth-23. This Superman, also known as Calvin Ellis, originates from Vathlo Island of his reality's Krypton.

Characters in Eric Jerome Dickey's novel The Son of Mr. Suleman discuss Vathlo Island and react with derision to the idea that there was segregation on Krypton.

==== Crisis on Infinite Earths ====
After the 1985 miniseries Crisis on Infinite Earths, the Silver Age version of Krypton was replaced by a newer version. The Silver Age Krypton made a rare post-Crisis appearance in The Sandman #48, during a flashback sequence.

=== Krypton in the Modern Age of Comic Books ===
The exploding planet Krypton from History of the DC Universe #1 (1986).

==== The Man of Steel ====
Following Crisis on Infinite Earths, which rebooted the history of the DC Universe and retroactively eliminated the existence of the Golden and Silver Age versions of Krypton, writer/artist John Byrne was given the task of recreating the Superman mythos. This rewrite was started in the 1986 Man of Steel miniseries, which addressed Krypton in both its opening and closing chapters.

Krypton itself was the main subject of the late 1980s The World of Krypton miniseries (not to be confused with the 1979 miniseries of the same name). This miniseries was written by Byrne and illustrated by Mike Mignola, and filled in much of Krypton's new history.

==== History ====
The new Krypton was approximately one-and-a-half times larger than Earth, and it orbited a red sun called Rao fifty light-years from the Solar System. Krypton's primordial era produced some of the most dangerous organisms in the universe. It was for this reason that 250,000 years ago, Krypton was chosen as the place to create Doomsday through forced evolution. Until its destruction, many dangerous animals, including ferrophage moles, still existed on Krypton. Kryptonians had to use their advanced technology to survive.

Over 200,000 years ago, Krypton advanced far beyond present-day Earth, and discovered a way to conquer disease and ageing by perfecting cloning; vast banks of clones, kept in stasis, held multiple copies of each living Kryptonian so that replacement parts were always available in the event of injury. All Kryptonians were now effectively immortal, "with all the strength and vigor of youth maintained", and for millennia they enjoyed an idyllic, sensual existence in an Arcadian paradise.

100,000 years later, Kryptonian society was tipping toward decadence and eventually political strife resulted from the debate about the use of clones (three by each Kryptonian; one child, one teen and one adult, perfectly preserved in stasis in large clone banks) to repair any hurt and avoiding death, if they were sentient beings and should have rights to be awakened to live as any other Kryptonian, sparked in addition by the presence of an alien missionary known as the Cleric, who carried "the Eradicator". Eventually this disagreement led to open violent conflict. A woman named Nyra, seeking what she considered a suitable mate for her son, Kan-Z, had one of her younger clones removed from stasis. The clone gained full sentience and was presented to society as a normal woman. When Kan-Z discovered that his fiancée was in fact his mother's clone, he killed the clone, then publicly killed his mother and also attempted his own suicide before being stopped. Kan-Z also publicly broadcast the entirety of his discovered findings as to what his mother had done across the entire planet. This key incident ignited the Clone Wars which lasted for 1,000 years, during which Kryptonian science was turned to warfare and several superweapons were developed and used. Among them was the device known as the Destroyer.

Although the Eradicator's effects (altering the DNA of all Kryptonian lifeforms so that they would instantly die upon leaving the planet) were felt immediately, the Destroyer's effects were more significant: by the time the Kryptonian government admitted defeat and abolished the clone banks, the pro-clone rights terrorist faction Black Zero had started the Destroyer (activated by Kan-Z himself), a device which functioned as a giant atomic energy gun, projecting nuclear energy into the core of Krypton and triggering an explosive chain reaction that destroyed Kandor. It was initially believed at the time that the device had been stopped before it could achieve planetary destruction. Centuries later, Jor-El discovered that the reaction had only been slowed to a nearly imperceptible rate and it would eventually destroy the planet as intended.

==== Destruction ====
Though it survived the war, Krypton was scarred deeply by it. The planet was burned and blasted to a desert, and a sterile society—emotionally unlike its predecessor—emerged. The population lived isolated from one another in widely separated technological citadels, shunning all physical and personal contact, to the point that even family members would only interact with each other via communication devices. Procreation became a matter of selecting compatible genetic material to be placed within an artificial womb called a "birthing matrix"; the parents almost never met in person and never touched one another. The planetary government was deeply isolationist and forbade space exploration and communication with other worlds.

The young scientist Jor-El was born into this world. By his adult years, a mysterious "Green Plague" was killing Kryptonians by the thousands, and upon researching the matter, Jor-El discovered that its cause was growing radiation produced by Krypton's unstable core. This process was going to cause the planet to explode. Unable to convince his associates to abandon tradition and consider escape, and reasoning that modern Kryptonian society had grown cold, unfeeling and sterile, Jor-El removed the Eradicator's planetary binding genes from his unborn son Kal-El's genetic pattern, took Kal-El's birthing matrix and attached a prototype interstellar propulsion system to the vessel. Just as the planet began to shake apart and massive, exploding streams of green energy erupted through the surface of Krypton, Jor-El launched the matrix towards Earth, where it would open and give birth to the infant upon landing (the post-Crisis Superman therefore was considered to be technically "born" on Earth). Jor-El was not only determined that his son would survive the death of his birthworld, but that he would grow up on a world that vibrantly embraced living, as his forebears once did.

In Superman Vol. 2 #18, it is revealed that Krypton still exists as a gas giant consisting of much of the remaining mass of the exploded planet, which will reform into a solid planet millions of years into the future.

==== The Last Son of Krypton ====
A central theme of this version of the Superman mythos was that the character was to remain the last surviving remnant of Krypton. Thus, Silver Age elements such as Supergirl, Krypto, Beppo, and Kandor had never existed in this version (though post-Crisis versions of these elements were eventually reintroduced).

The supervillain Doomsday was revealed in the 1990s as a being genetically engineered by Bertron, an alien scientist, on an ancient Krypton. Doomsday left the planet after killing Bertron and Krypton's natives found the remains of Bertron's lab, thus obtaining the knowledge of cloning.

In the newer continuity, Superman also became aware of his alien heritage only sometime after his debut as a superhero - initially assuming himself to be a human mutated in some manner and launched as part of an Earth space program - when a holographic program encoded into the craft which brought him to Earth uploaded the information into his brain (although Lex Luthor had earlier discovered his alien heritage when his attempts to create a clone of Superman were complicated by the unexpected x-factor of Superman's alien DNA).

==== Revisiting Krypton ====
In Action Comics #600 (May 1988), Krypton was close enough to Earth that the radiation from its explosion (traveling only at light speed) was able to reach Earth.

In a 1988 storyline, Superman traveled to the former site of Krypton to discover that the planet was slowly reforming from the vast sphere of debris remaining. It would take millions of years before the planet would be solid again. This sphere of debris had been turned to kryptonite by the planet's destruction, and the radiation caused Superman to have a hallucination in which the entire population of Krypton came to Earth and colonized the already inhabited planet, prompting Jor-El to initiate a Terran-based resistance movement, pitting him against his estranged wife Lara and now-grown son Kal-El, at which point the hallucination ended.

In a 1999 Starman storyline, Jack Knight became lost in time and space, and landed on Krypton several years before its destruction, meeting Jor-El as a young man. The story implies that it was this early meeting with a human that led Jor-El to study other worlds and eventually choose Earth as the target for his son's spacecraft; at the story's end, Jack gives Jor-El a device with the coordinates and images of Earth.

In a 2001–2002 storyline, an artificial version of the Pre-Crisis Krypton was created in the Phantom Zone by Brainiac 13, a descendant of the original Brainiac who had traveled back in time to the present. This version of Krypton was based on Jor-El's favorite Kryptonian historical period.

==== Superman: Birthright ====
In the 2004 miniseries Superman: Birthright, a new retelling of Superman's origin and early years, Mark Waid located Krypton in the Andromeda Galaxy 2.5 million light-years away, and adopted elements from several previous versions of the planet. Although usually depicted as a red giant or red supergiant, in this story Rao is mentioned by Jor-El to be a red dwarf.

In previous comic versions, it was assumed the "S" shield on Superman's costume simply stood for "Superman"; in Birthright, Waid presented it as a Kryptonian symbol of hope; he borrowed and modified a concept from Superman: The Movie, wherein the "S" was the symbol of the House of El, Superman's family.

==== Post-Birthright revisions ====
Beginning with Infinite Crisis, writer Geoff Johns began laying subtle hints to a new origin for Superman. Last Son, a storyline co-written by Geoff Johns and Superman film director Richard Donner, further delves into this version of Krypton which reintroduces General Zod and the Phantom Zone criminals into mainstream continuity as well as the crystalline technology known as "Sunstones". With art by Adam Kubert, the design of Kryptonian society is distinct yet again from Birthright, incorporating elements of both pre-Crisis on Infinite Earths continuity and Donner's work on the first two Christopher Reeve films, in particular the notion of Krypton's Council threatening Jor-El with harsh punishment if he were to make public his predictions of their planet's imminent doom. This variation of Krypton's past was again seen in flashbacks during Johns' Brainiac and New Krypton story arcs. The very different depictions of Kryptonian clothing in the Golden and Silver Age comics, in the Christopher Reeve films, and in John Byrne's The Man of Steel all appeared in Johns' Superman: Secret Origin (which superseded The Man of Steel and Superman: Birthright).

Multi-ethnic versions of Kryptonians that resemble Africans, Indigenous Australians, Pacific Islanders, Indigenous Americans, and Asians have also made appearances in the stories. Previously, "black" Kryptonians were mainly confined within the Kryptonian continent of Vathlo Island, but a 2011 storyline depicted Kryptonians resembling black and Asian humans who were more integrated into Kryptonian society than they were in the Silver and pre-Modern Age DC Universe.

==== The New 52 ====
Following Grant Morrison's run on Action Comics during The New 52, Krypton is again a scientific and cultural utopia, and Kryptonians themselves are highly intelligent, even from infancy; Morrison describes Krypton as "the planet of your dreams. A scientific utopia. I wanted to explore Krypton as the world of super people. What would happen if they worked it all out, if they lived for 500 years with amazing technology?" Cody Walker elaborates on this, saying that "Kal-El is the next step in evolution physically, but he comes from a planet that is the next stage in evolution as well. If his strength makes him the Man of Steel, then the ideologies that rule his planet make Superman the Man of Tomorrow". In Action Comics #14 (January 2013 cover date, published November 7, 2012) astrophysicist Neil deGrasse Tyson appears as a character in the story. He determines that Krypton orbited the red dwarf LHS 2520 in the constellation Corvus 27.1 light-years from Earth. Tyson assisted DC Comics in selecting a real-life star that would be an appropriate parent star to Krypton. He picked Corvus, which is Latin for "crow", because Superman's high school mascot is a crow. In a 2012 round-table discussion, Tyson stated that he chose to use real science when finding Krypton's location. He explained that many artists may only use bits and pieces of science, allowing for greater latitude in their creativity, but he wanted to show that using real science, particularly astrophysics, allows for just as much creativity.

== Known locations ==
- Bokos - it was nicknamed the Isle of Thieves.
- Lurvan - the largest continent on Krypton.
  - Argo City - one of the largest cities on Krypton. In many continuities, it is portrayed as having survived Krypton's destruction due to a protective field. Supergirl and her family were from Argo City.
  - Fire Falls - a natural geological location where lava flows down a cliff.
  - Jewel Mountains - a mountain range on Krypton. This was the location that Jax-Ur traveled back in time to in order to create Jewel Kryptonite.
  - Kandor - the capital city of Krypton. It was bottled by Brainiac.
  - Fort Rozz - a military command center in Kandor.
  - Plane of Wanan - a desolate location outside of Kandor.
  - Kryptonopolis - the largest city on Krypton and home to Jor-El and Lara. Kal-El was born here.
- Urrika - one of two continents found on Krypton.
  - Erkol - a city-state that had been in a war with Xan City.
  - Xan City - one of the oldest cities found on Krypton. It was destroyed in a long war with Erkol.
- Vathlo Island - an island continent. This location is where the black Kryptonians reside.
- Orvai - a lakeside city and the home of Quex-Ul.
- Surrus - a city in southern Continent, named after their singing Flowers Surrus (Superman #236, 1971).
- Twenx - a continent where the non-European and Asian-looking Kryptonians reside.

== In other media ==
=== Radio ===
The first non-comics version of Krypton was presented in the debut storyline of the 1940s Superman radio series. In the radio show, Krypton was part of the Solar System, a Counter-Earth sharing Earth's orbit but on the opposite side of the Sun, hidden from view of the Earth ("Krypton" derives from the Greek word for "hidden"). Some comics of the early 1950s suggested a similar theory, but in general the comics have depicted Krypton as being in a far-away star system.

=== Television ===
==== Live-action ====
- Krypton appears in the first-aired episode of Adventures of Superman. In this version, Jor-El proposes transporting the entire Kryptonian population to Earth via a fleet of rockets, but his proposal is rejected and the planet begins to break apart sooner than he expected anyway, leaving him only with a small test rocket, in which he and Lara use to launch Kal-El off.
- Krypton appears in Lois & Clark: The New Adventures of Superman. At the end of the third season, it is revealed that a sizable colony survived the planet's destruction. From what was shown of the colony (called New Krypton), the society, despite the advanced technology, had numerous archaic elements, like hereditary rule, arranged marriage for nobles, and trial by combat being legal for nobility. Unlike many incarnations, New Krypton is not isolated from other races; it has starships, including a large vessel that serves as its palace, and Nor hires an assassin from another race to kill Kal-El.
- The television series Smallville presents a version of Krypton that mirrors the Superman: The Movie aesthetic but has more ties to Earth. It was a peaceful and advanced planet until civil war broke out, leading to its destruction in 1986 by General Zod and the renegade Zor-El after they used Brainiac to ignite Krypton's unstable core. Numerous Kryptonian artifacts come into play during the show, such as the "Stones of Power" in season 4 (used to contain all information in the known 28 galaxies and become the Crystal of Knowledge to make the Fortress of Solitude), "The Orb" in season 8 (containing the DNA of fallen Kryptonian citizens/soldiers scanned and cloned by Jor-El), and its bible The Book of Rao (used to transport Kryptonians to "Heaven") during season 9. In season 2, more Kryptonian glyphs appear on Earth via the Kawatche Caves as there are prophecies discovered about a "Traveler" planted by Jor-El visiting Smallville.
- Krypton is featured in the Arrowverse Supergirl series, with its destruction depicted in the pilot. Kara was sent to Earth to protect her then-infant cousin, Kal-El. Krypton exploded just seconds after her pod took off, sending it into the Phantom Zone. The episode "Hostile Takeover" revealed that the planet was destroyed due to over-mining its core. The third-season episode "Dark Side of the Moon" revealed that Argo City was preserved along with many of the inhabitants on an asteroid formed from Kryptonian debris.
- Krypton is the main setting of the titular series of the same name. The main characters are Seg-El, Adam Strange, Kem, Lyta-Zod, Val-El, Nyssa-Vex, Jayna-Zod and Dev-Em. This version of Krypton became unstable after Brainiac steals Kandor in the original timeline, an event that forces Seg to stop with allies like Adam Strange from the future and even the future General Dru-Zod. This version also borrows some elements from the initial post-Crisis depiction, such as the reproduction of Kryptonians through artificial means in Genesis Chamber birthing facility. In the first season, 200 years before the birth of Kal-El, Krypton is ruled by a powerful religious figure known as Voice of Rao and the planet is divided in several guilds. Due to its decadent lifestyle of some Kryptonians, this causes a social inequality and those who are not in the guilds become Rankless. When Seg discovers that Voice of Rao is a puppet controlled by Brainiac, he forms a resistance movement of several friends and allies, including his son from the future, General Zod. After trapping Brainiac and Seg in the Phantom Zone, Zod takes power in Krypton, forcing all Rankless to become Sagitari soldiers and cutting some guilds, such as Religious and Lawmaker. In the second season, Seg returns to Krypton and gathers some of the surviving allies in order to stop Zod's murderous conquest. Zod also sends Sagitari and Doomsday weapon on the moon Wegthor to crush the rebels. After the moon is destroyed, Seg and almost all the rebels return to Krypton. When Seg and Lyta expose Zod's treachery, Zod tries to kill them, but is defeated and Sagitari forces are defeated by the resistance, ending a civil war on Krypton.

==== Animation ====
- Krypton was briefly depicted in the first Fleischer Studios-produced Superman cartoon in the early 1940s as "a planet that burned like a green star in the distant heavens [and where] civilization was far advanced and it brought forth a race of Supermen whose mental and physical powers were developed to the absolute peak of human perfection", implying that all Kryptonians had Superman's abilities even on their own planet. The planet is seen only from a distance, just before its explosion.
- Depictions of Krypton appear on both The New Adventures of Superman and Super Friends; in one of the "lost episodes" of Super Friends season of 1983–1984), "The Krypton Syndrome", Jor-El says that Krypton will be enveloped by their sun and explode a short time later.
- In the Superman: The Animated Series three-part premiere episode, "The Last Son of Krypton", Krypton's climate is shown to have both temperate and Arctic conditions. According to commentary on the DVD collection of the show's first season, Krypton's appearance was influenced by the art style of Jack Kirby.
  - In this version, Krypton was destroyed by its core destabilizing, with Brainiac choosing to save himself by transferring his consciousness into a satellite rather than save Krypton's people. The rest of Kryptonian civilization (save for Jor-El and his family) remained unaware of the danger until it was too late to evacuate.
  - Krypton had a "sister planet" named Argo (named after Argo City), colonized by Kryptonians many centuries before the destruction of Krypton. Krypton's destruction pushed Argo out of orbit, causing it to gradually cool. Its people went into cryostasis to survive, but their pods malfunctioned and shut down over time, leaving Supergirl the only survivor.
- Krypton appears in the Legion of Super Heroes episode "Message in a Bottle". In this version, Jor-El found a way to save the planet with his creation, the Messenger, which was kept in Kandor. Brainiac shrunk and stole Kandor and the Messenger, ensuring Krypton's destruction. At the end of the episode, the Legion of Super-Heroes use the Messenger to restore Krypton, and Kandor is restored to full size so its people can begin life anew.
- Krypton appears in the The Looney Tunes Show episode "Best Friends", in which Bugs Bunny tells Superman's origin story as his own origin story to prove that Daffy Duck is not paying attention to him.
- Krypton appears in the DC Super Hero Girls episode "#DCSuperHeroBoys". In a flashback, Alura Zor-El tells Zod that Krypton is collapsing on itself. She uses a device to send Zod and his minions Ursa and Non to the Phantom Zone, then tells Kara that she is sending her to join her cousin Kal.
- Krypton appears in My Adventures with Superman. In this version, Kryptonians lead an interstellar expansionist empire until they encountered a superior opponent, resulting in the planet's destruction and the Kryptonian race's extinction with the exception of two; the children of House El, Kal-El and Kara Zor-El, who were sent away by their respective fathers in order to escape the malevolent entity's genocide. Brainiac then used derelict Kryptonian warships and technology and manipulated it with the intention of starting a campaign of conquest and revealed that he was responsible for destroying the planet to avoid being decommissioned after Jor-El began peace talks with the unnamed enemy.

=== Film ===
==== Superman ====
In the first feature-length Superman film in 1978, a vastly less idyllic image of Krypton was presented. Whereas in the comics Krypton was colorful and bright, the film depicted the planet with stark bluish-white terrain of jagged frozen plateaus under heavy, dark skies. The planet was threatened by their sun turning into a supernova. Jor-El unsuccessfully attempted to persuade the council of elders to immediately evacuate the planet.

Kryptonians themselves were portrayed as coolly cerebral and morally enlightened, clad in stark white bodysuits emblazoned with each family's house symbol. The architecture featured halls of white crystal under crystalline arches. The crystalline motif was employed not only in the architecture, but in the landscape and technology as well, suggesting that the entire planet had been adapted and altered by Kryptonian influence. In 1948, Krypton was ultimately destroyed when its red sun began to collapse; the planet was pulled into the sun and steadily crushed, then exploded in the ensuing supernova. When Krypton was destroyed, fragments from the planet were launched into space, resulting in the creation of a harmful radioactive substance known as kryptonite.

Jor-El and Lara preserved some part of their "essence" (in the form of virtual copies of themselves) in the starship that took three years to bring their child to Earth. On Clark Kent's eighteenth birthday, a glowing crystal revealed itself in the ship and compelled Clark to take it north. He eventually reached the Arctic, where the crystal constructed the massive crystalline Fortress of Solitude. Inside, an artificially intelligent hologram of Jor-El appeared to him and initiated twelve years of Kryptonian education. These virtual versions of Jor-El and Lara remained as constructs within the Fortress throughout the series.

Superman's symbol was given a Kryptonian origin in the film. Male Kryptonians were shown wearing unique symbols on the chests of their robes, similar to a family crest; Jor-El and Kal-El wore the familiar S-shield, which Lois Lane later assumed to be the letter S from the familiar Latin alphabet, and thus dubs him "Superman".

==== Superman Returns ====
The 2006 film Superman Returns presents a version of Krypton almost identical to Superman. In the beginning of the film, scientists discover remains of Krypton, and Superman leaves Earth for five years to look for it. His ship is seen leaving the dead planet. The planet is destroyed when the red supergiant Rao becomes a supernova.

Superman Returns extends the crystalline Kryptonian technology from Superman which allowed young Clark Kent to "grow" the Fortress of Solitude. Kryptonian crystals are able to grow huge land masses and incorporate the properties of the surrounding environment; a sliver taken from one of the crystals used to test the theory causes Lex Luthor's basement to be filled with a huge crystal structure. Growing land in this manner causes widespread power failure. Lex Luthor later combines one of the crystals with kryptonite and shoots it into the ocean, creating a new land mass he calls "New Krypton". Superman uses his heat vision to get under the crust of the island and throws it into space, including the other crystals that Luthor wanted to use to set up a real estate scam, despite the warning that many people would die from the massive tsunamis and earthquakes that the crystals would create.

The novelization by Marv Wolfman states that one of Superman's ancestors helped civilize Krypton long ago.

==== DC Extended Universe ====
The DC Extended Universe's Krypton is introduced in the 2013 film Man of Steel and adds strong dystopian elements to Krypton and its fate. A prequel novel adds additional details. The planet is portrayed as having an Earth-like terrain composed of mountains, canyons and oceans. The planet is 8.7 billion years old and approximately 27.1 light years from Earth. Its parent star Rao is depicted as a 13 billion year old red dwarf sun. The planet's close proximity to the sun also keeps Krypton in constant daylight. Its gravity is much higher than that of Earth, and its atmospheric composition is unsuitable for humans. Krypton is also home to unique species of creatures, such as the bovine-like "Rondors", the dragon-like "H'Raka", and the pterodactyl-like "War-Kites". It is also shown to have a natural satellite. Kryptonian society is oligarchal and divided into houses, such as the House of El. Citizens wear the crests of their house over their chests, which hold meanings, such as the crest of House of El meaning "hope". The planet is unified under one government, ruled by an aristocratic "Science Council".

Kryptonian civilization is at least 100,000 years old and many millennia more advanced than human civilization on Earth, and had begun exploring the Milky Way Galaxy, with at least one ship reaching as far as Earth. After their colonies collapse, Kryptonians abandon these projects in favor of isolationism and artificial population control, engineering newborns for pre-determined roles in society. By the early 1980s, the planet's resources were strained, and the stability of the planet was threatened by careless mining of the planet's core. In addition, centuries of artificial, class-based reproduction had caused most Kryptonians to become docile and arrogant. As Jor-El attempts to warn the Science Council of their folly, General Zod stages a coup, which in turn sets off a massive civil war across the planet. In hopes of preserving the Kryptonian race, Jor-El steals the genetic Codex of the planet (a list holding the DNA pattern of everyone yet to be born on Krypton) and infuses it into the cells of Kal-El, the first natural-born child on Krypton in centuries and sends his son to Earth. Zod kills Jor-El and is arrested by the authorities. He and his followers are banished to the Phantom Zone shortly before Krypton is destroyed. The planets destruction frees Zod and his men from the Phantom Zone, and after learning of Earth's existence, they plan to xenoform it into a new Krypton. This is thwarted by an adult Kal-El (who's now Clark Kent/Superman), who kills Zod and destroys his xenoforming machines.

In the 2016 film Batman v Superman: Dawn of Justice, Lex Luthor Jr. who in a deal with a Senator gained access to the crashed Scout Ship, managed to enter the ship using the fingerprints of General Zod. Using Zod's Command Key, he managed to access the Ship's mainframe. Luthor eventually overrides General Zod's authority over the ship, and learns how to use the Genesis Chamber. The Ship warned against what it would create, but Lex ordered it to proceed. Over the course of a couple of days, Zod's body began metamorphosing into a "Kryptonian Deformity", a crime among the Kryptonian Science Council.

==== DC Universe ====
In the rebooted DC Universe, Krypton is shown in Supergirl to be an advanced society. Brothers Jor-El and Zor-El are prominent scientists who try to warn the counsel that the core is unstable but are rebuffed. The planet is destroyed when the core explodes, and baby Kal-El, Jor-El's son, is sent to Earth in a space capsule. Zor-El activates a force field which protects Argo City from the explosion and preserves it as a floating city. Eight years later, Zor-El and his wife Alura have a daughter, Kara Zor-El. However, it is discovered that the soil of Argo City has been irradiated with Kryptonite due to the core's explosion, and many citizens, including Alura, fall ill and die. To save Kara from the same fate, Zor-El reverse engineers the space capsule that sent Kal-El to Earth and sends Kara and her dog Krypto to Earth, where she becomes Supergirl.

In the film Superman, Superman discovers a missing message left by his Kryptonian parents which urge him to conquer Earth and take many wives to restore the Kryptonian race.

The planet's destruction is also depicted in the 2026 feature film Supergirl (2026 film).

==== Teen Titans Go! To the Movies ====
Krypton appears in Teen Titans Go! To the Movies. In the film, the Teen Titans travel to the planet and harmonize its crystals with music, preventing its destruction and preventing Kal-El from arriving on Earth and becoming Superman. The Titans later undo their actions and allow Krypton to be destroyed to ensure Superman's existence.

==== Superman: Unbound ====
Brainiac's abduction of Kandor, despite the resistance posed by Krypton's military, is shown in Superman: Unbound. Brainiac is infamous for destroying the planets he takes cities from, but he left Krypton intact. Jor-El correctly theorized that this was because Brainiac detected that the planet would soon explode anyway and decided not to bother wasting a missile on their sun. Jor-El and his brother Zor-El then sent their children to Earth on rockets while studying how to defeat Brainiac and convince their government of the danger to Krypton. At least some of the populace of Argo City also outlive their planet, but rather than preserving their city with an energy shield, they are abducted by Brainiac before the planet's destruction in response to Zor-El studying how to defeat the villain.

==== DC League of Super-Pets ====
In DC League of Super-Pets, the destruction of Krypton is depicted as the opening scene where Jor-El and Lara prepare to send Kal-El to Earth, but in this depiction, Kal-El's pet dog, Krypto, jumps into his carrier to accompany him. Jor-El reluctantly agrees to send him off in hopes that his son will have a lifelong friend to be there for him.

=== Novelizations ===
==== Last Son of Krypton ====
The 1978 novel Last Son of Krypton by Elliot S. Maggin contains descriptions of Krypton, mainly referencing the Silver Age version; it describes the planet as a "failed star" with massive surface gravity and hostile conditions, which forced extreme adaptation and rapid evolution in the descendants of humanoid space travelers. This led to an extremely strong, dense, and durable Kryptonian species with unusual physical properties. Maggin describes the rise of a civilization which uses geothermal heat as its primary power source, developing science and technology, but finding it difficult to escape the massive world's gravity. Eventually its internal nuclear reactions led to Krypton's explosion.

==== The Last Days of Krypton ====
Novelist Kevin J. Anderson presents approximately the last Earth year before Krypton's destruction in the 2007 novel The Last Days of Krypton. Jor-El, Lara, Zod, and Zor-El are the primary point-of-view characters. Following Brainiac's abduction of Kandor, Zod attempts to seize power, eventually leading to a civil war. Here Jor-El manages to avert several disasters threatening Krypton before an attempt to destroy the Phantom Zone by several reactionary council members who Zod had previously imprisoned there destabilizes Krypton's core and destroys the planet. In addition to Kal-El's rocket and the forcefield surrounding Argo City, a third avenue for escaping the planet is represented by hordes of engineers who do believe Jor-El's warning and attempt to build several space arks to escape the planet. Ultimately, they are unable to complete the ships fast enough. In the novel, Kryptonopolis is built over the ruins of Xan City.

== See also ==
- Fictional planets
- Phaeton (hypothetical planet), whom British-born astronomer Michael Ovenden suggested be named "Krypton" after Superman's home world instead
