= Dev-Em =

Fictional character who appears in DC Comics

- Dev-Em as depicted in Legion of Super-Heroes vol. 3 #15 (October 1985). Art by Steve Lightle.

Publication information
- Publisher: DC Comics
- First appearance: Adventure Comics #287 (June 1961)
- Created by: Jerry Siegel (writer); George Papp (artist)

In-story information
- Team affiliations: Interstellar Counter-Intelligence Corps; Legion of Super-Heroes
- Abilities: Superhuman strength, speed, stamina, invulnerability, freezing breath, super hearing, multiple extrasensory and vision powers, flight, and intelligence.

Dev-Em is a fictional character who appears in DC Comics. He first appeared in Adventure Comics #287 (June 1961), created by Jerry Siegel and George Papp. Various versions of the Dev-Em character have appeared over the years in Legion of Super-Heroes related comic books.

The original Dev-Em is a Kryptonian juvenile delinquent that attacked Superboy; after being thwarted by Superboy, Dev-Em traveled to the 30th century and becomes an occasional ally of the Legion. Following the Crisis on Infinite Earths continuity reboot, he is re-imagined as a Daxamite. Post-Infinite Crisis, he was once again made a Kryptonian; a criminal sentenced to the Phantom Zone.

== Fictional character biography ==
=== Pre-Crisis ===
In pre-Crisis on Infinite Earths continuity, Dev-Em is a Kryptonian juvenile delinquent who took Jor-El's warnings of Krypton's impending doom seriously enough to place himself in suspended animation in an orbiting space capsule. When Krypton exploded, Dev-Em's ship was blasted into space, where it eventually landed on Earth. Dev-Em imprisons Superboy in the Phantom Zone and assumes his identity in an effort to destroy the Boy of Steel's reputation. Eventually he frees Superboy and departs from the twentieth century, traveling through time to finally settle on the more advanced Earth of the 30th century. Since the people of Smallville will not believe Superboy's story of the impostor, he has to use a cover story that he was acting under the influence of Red Kryptonite to restore his reputation.

Dev-Em returns in Adventure Comics #320 (May 1964), where it is revealed that he has reformed and joined the Interstellar Counter-Intelligence Corps of the 30th century. He is reluctantly offered membership in the Legion of Super-Heroes, but turns it down. Despite his occasionally abrasive nature, Dev-Em aids the Legion on several occasions, most notably in the "Great Darkness Saga" against Darkseid.

=== Post-Crisis, Pre-Zero Hour ===
Following the Crisis on Infinite Earths reboot, Superman was made the only survivor of Krypton. Dev-Em is reimagined as David Emery, a resident of Titan who uses his mental powers to replicate Kryptonian abilities.

Dev-Em appears in the "Time and Time Again" storyline, in which Superman bounces between the 30th century (home of the Legion) and the 20th century. Superman encounters Dev-Em, now portrayed as an adult Daxamite. Dev-Em attempts to destroy the Earth's moon, but is challenged by the Legion. Dev-Em makes short work of Superman, Laurel Gand and the rest of the Legion. Dev-Em is seemingly stopped by Shrinking Violet, but initiates the Dominators' covert Triple Strike program, destroying the moon and causing massive damage to cities across Earth.

=== Post-Infinite Crisis ===
In the aftermath of Infinite Crisis, in which Conner Kent was killed, a man going by the name Devem is seen as part of a cult of Kryptonian worshippers called the "Cult of Conner" in 52. He is revealed to actually be a "psych-ward refugee named Derek Mathers who has a history of fraud".

In Action Comics, Dev-Em is reintroduced as a renegade Kryptonian being held as a prisoner for murder and perversion. As with most Kryptonian prisoners, he is sentenced to the Phantom Zone. He attacks Superman there but is eventually taken down by Mon-El.

== Powers and abilities ==
In both his Daxamite and Kryptonian iterations, Dev-Em possesses the same superhuman abilities of both races while beneath the empowering light of a yellow sun such as that of Earth's solar system. His basic abilities are superhuman strength, superhuman speed and superhuman stamina sufficient to bend steel in his bare hands, overpower a locomotive, leap over a tall building in a single bound and outrun a speeding bullet; heightened senses of hearing and sight including X-ray vision as well as telescopic and microscopic vision; virtual invulnerability; accelerated healing; longevity; powerful freezing breath; heat vision; and flight.

== In other media ==
Revard Dufresne as Dev-Em II as depicted in Man of Steel.

- Dev-Em appears in Krypton, portrayed by Aaron Pierre. This version is a member of Kandor's military, the Sagitari squadron.
- Dev-Em II appears in Man of Steel, portrayed by Revard Dufresne. This version is a member of General Zod's battalion, the Sword of Rao, who was previously imprisoned in the Phantom Zone.
  - Dev-Em II's ancestor, Dev-Em I, appears in the Man of Steel prequel comic. After becoming a candidate for a scout ship mission, he kills its crew before he is killed in turn by Kara Zor-El.
