= Krypton (TV series) =

American television series based on Superman

- Genre: Drama; Science fiction; Superhero
- Based on: Characters created by Jerry Siegel and Joe Shuster and characters from DC Comics
- Developed by: David S. Goyer
- Starring: Cameron Cuffe; Georgina Campbell; Shaun Sipos; Elliot Cowan; Ann Ogbomo; Aaron Pierre; Rasmus Hardiker; Wallis Day; Blake Ritson; Ian McElhinney; Colin Salmon; Hannah Waddingham
- Composer: Pinar Toprak
- Country of origin: United States
- Original language: English
- No. of seasons: 2
- No. of episodes: 20

Production
- Executive producers: David S. Goyer; Cameron Welsh; Damian Kindler
- Producer: Andjelka Viaislavjevic
- Production locations: Belfast, Northern Ireland; Montreal, Quebec, Canada; Serbia
- Cinematography: Christopher Baffa; James Mather; Simon Dennis
- Editors: Joel Griffen; Jeff Betancourt
- Camera setup: Single-camera
- Running time: 41-44 minutes
- Production companies: Phantom Four Films; DC Entertainment; Warner Horizon Television

Original release
- Network: Syfy
- Release: March 21, 2018 – August 14, 2019

Krypton is an American science fiction television series developed by David S. Goyer for Syfy. Focusing on Seg-El (Cameron Cuffe), the grandfather of DC Comics superhero Kal-El / Superman, the series is set approximately 200 years before the birth of Superman and takes place on the eponymous fictional planet. Krypton premiered on March 21, 2018. Its first season consists of ten episodes. The second season of ten episodes premiered on June 12, 2019. After its broadcast, Syfy canceled the series after two seasons in August.

== Premise ==
Krypton follows Superman's grandfather, Seg-El, whose family, the House of El, has been ostracized and shamed. Seg fights to redeem his family's honor and save his beloved world from chaos.

== Cast and characters ==
=== Main ===
- Cameron Cuffe as Seg-El: Scion of the House of El, father of Jor-El and grandfather of Kal-El.
  - Nicholas Witham-Mueller as young Seg-El.
- Georgina Campbell as Lyta-Zod: Primus of the Kryptonian military guild who was previously in a clandestine link with Seg-El.
- Shaun Sipos as Adam Strange: A human from the future who forewarns Seg-El of Brainiac, and tells him of his yet-to-be born grandson Kal-El.
- Elliot Cowan as Daron-Vex: The former chief magistrate of Kandor, charged with defending Krypton's oligarchy.
- Ann Ogbomo as Jayna-Zod: The former Primus of the Kryptonian military guild, and mother of Lyta.
  - Asiatu Koroma portrays young Jayna.
- Aaron Pierre as Dev-Em: A former commander in the Kryptonian army, and Lyta's ex-betrothed.
- Rasmus Hardiker as Kem: A former bar owner and Seg's best friend.
- Wallis Day as Nyssa-Vex: The former junior magistrate and Daron-Vex's daughter. She and Seg have a son, Cor-Vex, whom they rename Jor-El.
- Blake Ritson as Brainiac: An alien android from the planet Colu who collects cities from their planets. Brainiac takes over the mind of Krypton's religious figure the Voice of Rao.
- Ian McElhinney as Val-El: Seg's grandfather, who defied death by going to the Phantom Zone and is a staunch believer in space exploration.
- Colin Salmon as General Dru-Zod: The future son of Lyta-Zod and Seg-El and the new ruler of Krypton.
- Hannah Waddingham as Jax-Ur (formerly Sela-Sonn) (main season 2; recurring season 1): ex-leader of the Black Zero terrorist group and Val's former protégée.

=== Recurring ===
- Alexis Raben as Rhom (season 1): A rankless Kryptonian, the mother of Ona, and a friend of the House of El.
- Tipper Seifert-Cleveland as Ona (season 1): The daughter of Rhom who is made a disciple of Rao upon being orphaned.
- Andrea Vasiliou as Kol-Da (season 1): A callous member of the Sagitari, and Daron's lover.
- Sarah Armstrong as Kiyo (season 1): A member of Black Zero.
- India Mullen as Sevi (season 1): A member of the Religious Guild, who attend to the Voice of Rao.
- Kim Adis as Anda (recurring - season 1; guest - season 2): A member of the Religious Guild, who attend to the voice of Rao.
- Sonita Henry as Raika (season 1 and 2): A member of the Cythonnite sect who is saved by Seg, and later assists him.
- Shobu Kapoor as Mama Zed (season 1 and 2): An adoptive mother of Kem.
- Lukas Loughran as Junra (season 1): A member of the Cythonnite sect who is hostile towards outsiders.
- Beatrice Comins as Anireh (season 1): The leader of the Cythonnite sect.
- Faisal Mohammed (uncredited) as Vidar-Zod (season 1 and 2): A brother of Jayna-Zod and the son of Lor-Zod, who was trained to become a powerful warrior, but he died in one mission on Outlands. In the season 2, he is an hallucination to Jayna-Zod.
  - Malachi Halett as Young Vidar.
- Nicholas Prasad as Mal (season 1): A Black Zero operative and a right hand to Jax-Ur.
- Emmett J. Scanlan as Lobo (season 2): A bounty hunter and assassin with regenerative powers and enhanced strength who is living on Colu and wants revenge against Brainiac.
- Kae Alexander as Araame (season 2): A former Sagitari instructor and one of Nyssa's former lovers who is a rebel fighter on Wegthor and a right hand to Jax-Ur.
- Ciarán Owens as Preus (season 2): A Sagitari commander on the moon Wegthor.
- Aoibhinn McGinnity as Lis-Ser (season 2): A Kryptonian scientist trying to put Doomsday under Dru-Zod's control.

=== Guest ===
- Rupert Graves as Ter-El (season 1): Seg's father.
- Paula Malcomson as Charys-El (season 1): Seg's mother.
- Gordon Alexander as Quex-Ul (season 1): The former commander of Lyta's Sagitari squadron.
- Emmanuel Ighodaro as Lor-Zod (season 1): A Sagitari and father of Jayna-Zod and Vidar-Zod who trained them to become a warriors in the past before dying.
- Toby-Alexander Smith as Lor-Ran (season 2): A former Rankless and a recruit into Sagitari.
- Staz Nair as Dax-Baron / Doomsday: A Kryptonian who participated in a test which turned him into Doomsday. Doomsday appears in CGI throughout the first and second season, while Nair appears in his Kryptonian form during flashbacks in the second season.
- Toni O'Rourke as Wedna-El (season 2): A Kryptonian scientist who was responsible for creating Doomsday.
- Dempsey Bovell as Van-Zod (season 2): A Kryptonian scientist who was also responsible for creating Doomsday.

== Episodes ==
Season	Episodes	Originally released	
Season	Episodes	First released	Last released
1	10	March 21, 2018	May 23, 2018
2	10	June 12, 2019	August 14, 2019

=== Season 1 (2018) ===
No. overall	No. in season	Title	Directed by	Written by	Original release date	Prod. code	US viewers (millions)
1	1	"Pilot"	Ciaran Donnelly and Colm McCarthy	Teleplay & Story by : David S. Goyer and Ian Goldberg	March 21, 2018	U13.12991	1.32
200 years before the time of Kal-El (Superman), the corrupt regime leading the city of Kandor on Krypton executes Val-El, grandfather of Seg-El, for treason. Seg and his parents are stripped of their privileges and banished to the lower class slums. Fourteen years later, chief magistrate Daron-Vex, the same man who condemned the Els, arranges a marriage between Seg and his youngest daughter Nyssa, which will allow Seg to be restored to the upper classes. Adam Strange, a man from Earth in the future, gives Seg a Sunstone with the El symbol and telling him to find the "fortress". Seg's mother Charys takes him to the hidden Fortress of Solitude, which contains Val-El's research. Val had discovered an alien threat to Krypton, but was silenced for it. Charys is arrested. Brought before the council, and refusing to reveal the Fortress, Seg's parents attack the guards, only to be killed by Jayna-Zod. Back at the Fortress, Adam tells a depressed Seg that the future is bright, but it is fading due to temporal meddling by a cosmic evil seeking to erase Superman.
2	2	"House of El"	Ciaran Donnelly	Cameron Welsh	March 28, 2018	U13.12952	1.07
Seg disregards Adam's warning and plans vengeance on Daron, who explains that Val was executed for his heretical belief in life existing far from Krypton, convincing Seg of Adam's warning. Seg brings a Science Guild data tablet to Adam and Kem for examination, but as the data disagrees with Val's research, Seg plans to kill Daron. Nyssa gives Seg his parents' ashes for closure, and to manipulate his trust. Seg uses his blood to open a DNA lock in the Fortress, activating a hologram of Val. Seg learns of Brainiac, a "world collector" with Krypton in its sights. While reviewing the data further, Kem and Adam find evidence of a scout probe, and deduce that Brainiac is already on his way. Jayna's daughter Lyta, disturbed by the Military Guild readying to purge the slums to weed out Black Zero terrorists, challenges Quex-Ul to the death for command. Though Jayna warns her, Lyta mercilessly kills Quex-Ul, taking command of the squadron.
3	3	"The Rankless Initiative"	Steve Shill	Nadria Tucker	April 4, 2018	U13.12953	0.95
The Val hologram examines Brainiac's probe, learning it carried a sentry to infect a host. Adam finds the sentry probe on the black market, and brings it to Seg and Kem. The Sagitari begin to process the rankless, looking for Black Zero agents. Adam covertly brings the probe to Val, who reveals that the sentry itself is gone, and is active in a host. This host—Seg's neighbor Rhom—is activated by Brainiac and begins killing soldiers in her path. The Sagitari use excessive force on the rankless to coerce information about the bodies, leading to officer Kol-Da killing an unarmed man. Lyta arrests her. Seg uses a shock grenade from Lyta to take down the fully infected Rhom, who is gathering data about Krypton and transmitting it to Brainiac. Seg reveals to Lyta that Val was right about a pending threat to the planet, and the two prepare to defend Krypton without the Council's interference. Val confirms that Brainiac's modifications are keeping Rhom alive, and that she is a tracker that is now bringing Brainiac to Krypton.
4	4	"The Word of Rao"	Keith Boak	Luke Kalteux	April 11, 2018	U13.12954	0.87
Finding the failed Black Zero Initiative has caused discontent, Krypton's religious idol the Voice of Rao needs a scapegoat, and has Daron arrest Lyta on charges of treason. Elsewhere, "The Commander", a new player in Black Zero, orders his men to find Seg. Kem informs Seg of Lyta's predicament, and Seg asks Nyssa to save Lyta. Nyssa realizes her father falsified evidence, jeopardizing their plot to overthrow Rao. Nyssa makes an offer to Jayna: in exchange for Zod's support of the Vex coup, the Vexes will save Lyta. Torn between her honor and her love for Lyta, Jayna is hesitant. The Commander, fully aware of Brainiac, captures and questions Seg, as he needs to dissect the sentry before it finds a new host. Kem tells Rhom's daughter Ona that Rhom is dying; Ona presents a statuette in offering to the Voice of Rao, who takes Ona as one of his disciples. At the Fortress, Rhom's last words are to stop Ona, as the statuette contains another sentry, which now infects the Voice of Rao. Seg escapes, but must navigate the endless Badlands storms.
5	5	"House of Zod"	Julius Ramsay	Lina Patel	April 18, 2018	U13.12955	0.72
Realizing Nyssa did it for Seg, Daron is enraged that Nyssa exposed their plans to Jayna. As Lyta is about to be killed, Jayna signals Nyssa that she will cooperate, and Daron stays the execution by saying that Kol-Da has recanted. The Sagitari stage Kol-Da's suicide. Jayna tells Lyta she loves her, but she has brought dishonor to the House of Zod. Seg rescues a woman, Raika, who guides him to a vault bearing a symbol combining the crests of houses Zod and El. Her people are alarmed when they learn that Seg is an El. They are exiled believers of the ice goddess Cythonna, and have guarded the vault for generations. Seg escapes, but as his respirator fails he uses the batteries to power his comm device, calling Adam so Lyta can find him. The Commander finds Seg near death, and after taking him back to the base, explains to Seg that the vault holds the key to stopping Brainiac. As Adam frees Seg, the Commander fights Lyta alone, and reveals he is really her son, Dru-Zod.
6	6	"Civil Wars"	Kate Dennis	Doris Egan	April 25, 2018	U13.12956	0.60
Dru-Zod explains that Brainiac's eventual removal of the city of Kandor from Krypton's surface leads to the planet's self-destruction. Knowing that in the future General Zod is "Superman's greatest enemy", Adam warns Seg and Lyta not to trust him, but Seg feels betrayed by Adam, who never mentioned Krypton's destruction. Seg and Zod use their co-mingled blood to open the vault, but a horrified Adam explains that the "weapon" it contains is Doomsday, an unstoppable humanoid killing machine created ages ago by the Els and Zods which will destroy whatever it sees. Though they decide not to release Doomsday, Seg cuts ties with Adam. Jayna recruits Dev-Em to the Vex conspiracy. A convicted terrorist bomber is released as a scapegoat for the pending attack on the Voice of Rao, and Jayna is forced to kill a soldier who suspects something is amiss. When the Voice commands Dev to open the Nova Cycle ceremony to the public, and Jayna and Daron forbid him from aborting the plot, Dev instead evacuates the ceremony and escorts the Voice to his chambers. There, Sagitari prepare to kill him, but the Brainiac-possessed Voice lashes out with destructive tentacles.
7	7	"Transformation"	Metin Hüseyin	David Paul Francis	May 2, 2018	U13.12957	0.63
As the infected Voice of Rao enslaves his attackers, Jayna escapes. Daron is forced to confess his complicity in the plot to Brainiac, who allows him to live as long as he executes Nyssa with the other conspirators. Seg and Lyta learn of the failed coup and Nyssa's house arrest. Having survived, Dev finds Lyta, and helps her search for Jayna. Nyssa thwarts her father's attempt to kill her, and escapes with Seg, who has come to help her as payback for her saving Lyta. When Jayna is found, she reveals to Lyta that she joined the coup to save her daughter's life. Dev reveals that he has been enslaved by Brainiac, and the Zods must join him or die. Lyta manages to shoot off his left arm, and leaves him for dead. Seg, Nyssa, and the Zods stage an assassination attempt on Brainiac, knowing they cannot harm him but hoping to incite the citizens of Kandor by forcing him to reveal his true alien self. The plan backfires when Brainiac makes a showy display of fiery power that he positions as a manifestation of Rao. Meanwhile, Adam decides to kill Dru-Zod and stop Seg from saving Kandor.
8	8	"Savage Night"	Marc Roskin	David Kob	May 9, 2018	U13.12958	0.53
Seg and his allies learn that Brainiac is draining the life force from the Genesis Chamber, and plot to attack him there, where they believe he is vulnerable. Lyta finds that Dev is alive, and takes him to Val at the Fortress of Solitude. Zod brings Jayna to meet Jax-Ur, the leader of Black Zero, who agrees to help them access the Genesis Chamber in exchange for the delivery of Daron to her. Val frees Dev from Brainiac's control and hacks the Sagitari network. After Kem refuses to let him near Seg, Adam warns Daron of the impending attack. Jayna delivers a mortal injury to the Voice of Rao, but Brainiac is unharmed and escapes in the Voice's damaged body. After speaking with Zod about his origins, Jayna confides in Seg that she suspects he intends to conquer Krypton. Brainiac sends Ona to Seg as a bomb, but Adam saves Seg and Kem with his Zeta Beam device, while he is teleported to an unknown location, where he faces a motionless woman.
9	9	"Hope"	Lukas Ettlin	Chad Fiveash & James Stoteraux	May 16, 2018	U13.12959	0.61
Zod and Lyta want to use Doomsday against Brainiac, but Seg refuses to use his blood to help Zod open the vault. Zod, however, has deduced that Seg is his father, so he is both a Zod and an El. The vault is empty; Seg and the followers of Cythonna have moved Doomsday. Jax-Ur, Val's former protégée, interrogates Daron. Zod challenges Jayna to a duel to the death, but Lyta stops Jayna from killing him. Seg and Nyssa convince Black Zero and the remaining Sagitari to work together against Brainiac, but the attack fails. Nyssa stops Brainiac from killing Seg by destroying the Voice's body, but Brainiac himself manifests in Kandor.
10	10	"The Phantom Zone"	Ciaran Donnelly	Chad Fiveash & James Stoteraux & Cameron Welsh	May 23, 2018	U13.12960	0.56
With Kandor's protective dome disabled, Brainiac's ship arrives and begins collecting the city. Zod reveals that Val is alive, trapped in the Phantom Zone, and retrieves him. Val explains that there's no way to avoid Brainiac's victory. Jax tells Nyssa that she is a clone of the original Nyssa, created using a method of immortality for Kandor's elite devised from Jax's codex technology. Later, Zod offers up Val and his future knowledge to Brainiac, in exchange for sparing Kandor. At the Fortress of Solitude, Seg traps Brainiac in the Phantom Zone, but Brainiac pulls Seg in with him at the last second. Superman's cape is restored, but it now bears the Zod crest, and Dru-Zod destroys the Phantom Zone gateway to continue the new timeline. After a month, Zod seizes control of Kandor, and other Kryptonian city-states, as Val tries to repair the gateway. In an unknown location elsewhere, Doomsday escapes containment. In the altered future, Adam sees a giant statue of Zod in the immobilized Earth city he is in.

=== Season 2 (2019) ===
No. overall	No. in season	Title	Directed by	Written by	Original release date	Prod. code	US viewers (millions)
11	1	"Light-Years From Home"	Marc Roskin	David S. Goyer & Cameron Welsh	June 12, 2019	U13.13451	0.48
Six months have passed since Dru-Zod conquered Krypton, and Lyta is torturing Kryptonians to find Doomsday to be used as a weapon in coercive colonization of alien worlds. Elsewhere, Val and Jax lead a resistance against Zod when Adam returns; in the future, Zod has conquered Earth, which Brainiac then captures. Realizing this, Val postulates that Seg may have escaped the Phantom Zone with the Sunstone. Luring Nyssa into a trap, Lyta captures her and hands her baby Cor-Vex to Zod, who wishes to raise him like a son. Val and Jax flee to the moon of Wegthor to lead the resistance. Brainiac poses as Val to deceive Seg into freeing them from the Phantom Zone, landing on Brainiac's homeworld of Colu, reduced to a vast wilderness after Brainiac killed his people. Later, after he kills Brainiac, Seg joyfully reunites with Adam, but the two are confronted by Lobo, an alien bounty hunter.
12	2	"Ghost in the Fire"	Marc Roskin	Kiersten Van Horne	June 19, 2019	U13.13452	0.43
Two Scouts in the Outlands are killed by Doomsday, alerting Zod. Lyta trains conscripts for Wegthor, but under a mental break brutalizes a student resembling Seg; Zod hands her Cor-Vex to raise as Seg's baby to help her balance out. Zod sends Nyssa as a spy to Wegthor, where she meets with Val and Jax for help saving her baby. Jayna and her lost brother Vidar travel the Outlands, swearing to end the cycle of Zods breeding killers. Reaching a bridge, Jayna bids farewell to Vidar, a ghost in her mind, and later meets Dev-Em in a rundown pub. As Lobo is after Brainiac, Seg explains he killed the villain and leads Lobo to the body in exchange for their lives. Finding the body, Lobo's gear detects Seg is infected by Brainiac and they fight. To save Seg, Adam shoots Lobo with his own gun to escape as he regenerates, and the two try to recover the Zeta-Beam device to return to Krypton. Seg, however, refuses to do so as Brainiac still infects him, and begs Adam to leave him.
13	3	"Will to Power"	Julius Ramsay	Lina Patel	June 26, 2019	U13.13453	0.49
While Seg and Adam escape from Lobo, Seg battles for control of his body, discovering that he and Brainiac share two-way access of minds. Brainiac's memories lead the two to a birthing chamber in a cave where Brainiac was created, planning to extract Brainiac from Seg and implant him in another body for Lobo to kill. Lobo also finds the cave, with his arm severed by a force field into the chamber. Getting around the defenses, Lobo blows his head off to regenerate by way of his severed arm. Brainiac tries taking over Seg with memories of loved ones, but Seg shows greater willpower to win back his body. Now free, Seg and Adam narrowly escape using the Zeta-Beam device, leaving a delighted Lobo to kill a renewed Brainiac. Seg and Adam arrive in the Outlands, but Seg momentarily dies upon reentry until Adam revives him; the friends journey back to Kandor. Meanwhile, Nyssa successfully steals information on a rebel weapon, which scares her. In Kandor, Zod reluctantly sends Lyta to ensure no fatalities in the conquest of Wegthor; Kem, one of the many conscripts, heads into formation as the battle enters its prelude. Elsewhere, Jayna and Dev reconcile.
14	4	"Danger Close"	Julius Ramsay	Luke Kalteux	July 3, 2019	U13.13454	0.45
Arriving in Kandor, Seg leaves Adam to find Lyta, and they reunite passionately. Adam departs for Wegthor and is captured alongside Kem by rebels, then freed by Val. As Lyta shows Cor to Seg, Dru-Zod arrives and takes Seg for a medical check. Raika is among the staff; when she faints, Seg uses his status as Zod's father to learn she has been reconditioned. He is horrified to discover Lyta was also reconditioned, but Zod enters and orders the same fate for Seg. He survives the operation, then overpowers the technician. Finding Brainiac is again (or still) bonded to him, he deletes the evidence. Lost in the tunnels looking for an evacuation route, Kem and Adam discover Zod's men lying in wait with decoys planted to lure out the rebels. As rebels march on a Sagitari base, the oxygenators fail, sabotaged by Zod, and all suffocate in the field. Nyssa, having intercepted a message to Araama, tells Val about Jax's Codex Weapon and he removes it. At the Space Elevator, Kem and Adam's group is found and detained by Lyta's Squad.
15	5	"A Better Yesterday"	Metin Huseyin	David Kob	July 10, 2019	U13.13455	0.38
Seg captures Dru-Zod to force him to order a ceasefire, but a solar flare is preventing communications. Meanwhile, Nyssa is escorted off Wegthor by Sagitari, and learns of the doomed rebels. Val confronts Jax over the Codex-Weapon, but she is adamant about it bringing a swift end to the war. Calling for a parley, Val and Jax meet Lyta, who demands unconditional surrender, only for Jax to kill all Sagitari guarding her and capture Lyta; broadcasting her demands once the signals clear. Val opposes Jax's escalation, so she has rebels loyal to her detain him. Seeing Lyta a hostage, Seg is overpowered by Dru-Zod, who then converses with Jax. Seg is helped by Brainiac in his mind, giving him the means to escape Dru-Zod's hold as Jayna and Dev arrive to save him. Elsewhere, under Sagitari guard, Adam and Kem are freed by Nyssa, who is secretly heading for the Space Elevator to deliver the Codex. The two return to Jax, informing her of Zod's men in hiding. Enraged, Jax tells Krypton of Zod's deceit and executes Lyta publicly.
16	6	"In Zod We Trust"	Metin Huseyin	Nadria Tucker	July 17, 2019	U13.13456	0.37
Following Lyta's death, Val rallies the rebel force under him for a path to change and hope, having Jax imprisoned. Zod's rage boils beyond reason and threatens every person on Wegthor if Jax isn't delivered unto him. Although devastated by Lyta's death, Seg informs Jayna and Dev of Lyta's reconditioning, and they vow to save the Krypton she loved. Dev overhears on comm-chatter about Nyssa, so the three save her, and Seg forms a plan. Nyssa brings Zod a voice encrypted Codex, demanding she see Cor. Upon attaining him, she leaps out off the ledge with him into a skimmer with Seg, and they fly into the Outlands for Dev-Em's encampment. Jax escapes with gravity bombs to trap Zod's Sagitari on the Space Elevator. While Val stops her, he decides to call Zod to detonate the bombs to show defiance and allow Jax to flee independent of the rebellion. Zod's scientists prepare the Codex, but a failsafe forces an angry Zod to test it himself on Doomsday in the Outlands. Reluctantly, Seg agrees to Brainiac's plan to stop Zod, and he tells Nyssa about it while promising to protect her and baby Cor.
17	7	"Zods and Monsters"	Erica Watson	Joel Anderson Thompson	July 24, 2019	U13.13457	0.46
Doomsday dreams of his past-life as the soldier Dax, his wife Enaj, and the experiments by Houses El and Zod 1,000 years ago. Having the "Vara" Gene, Dax undergoes the horrific experiments, even after Jo-Man unified Krypton, Enaj later found Dax as Doomsday. In the present, Zod probes Doomsday's memories, and finds Enaj's name triggers compliance. On Wegthor, Kem leads a mission to find hidden Sagitari, and with Adam's help, Kem maintains the trust of his squad as he rescues Sagitari abandoned by Zod. As Seg fights Brainiac for control, Nyssa flies them to the Fortress where the Val hologram helps remove Brainiac. As Brainiac's nanites provide resistance, Nyssa manually removes the infection by Holo-Val's instructions. Now free, Nyssa wants the Vex name discontinued, and they rename Cor-Vex after Val's father, Jor-El, but after removal, the nanites escape, and take over Holo-Val. Brainiac regains command of his Skull-Ship, and reinterprets his directive to preserve "the best of Krypton" to no longer mean Kandor, but the bloodline of House El. Thus, Brainiac teleports Jor-El to his ship and goes into hyperspace, leaving a devastated Nyssa as Seg holds her.
18	8	"Mercy"	Clare Kilner	Katie Aldrin	July 31, 2019	U13.13458	0.38
After spending hours scanning various sectors of known space, Nyssa has Seg stop to think of a new method to save their son. Nyssa remembers Val saw multiple timelines of Brainiac, but with Wegthor radio silent, they turn to Dev-Em and Jayna for aid. To destroy Zod's space fleet and save the rebellion, Seg reveals old bootlegger tunnels near Fort-Rozz, allowing a covert approach to the shipyard, but Seg and Nyssa are captured. Needing a way to control Doomsday, Zod uses the Black Mercy attached to Lyta, revealing that Jax killed her clone to his scientist. Immediately after Seg's vanishing, Lyta tried reasoning a peaceful path, but he pacified and imprisoned her in a dream reality living happily with Seg. From Zod's taking some of the Mercy's toxin, Lyta soon breaks free due to inconsistencies in the dream. Lyta escapes and luckily encounters Dev and Jayna, saving them from Sagitari. Updating them to her status, they manage to rescue Seg and Nyssa from Dru-Zod and escape to the Rankless sector. An enraged Zod moves up the launch upon finding Lyta's holding chamber empty, and plans to repurpose the Black Mercy.
19	9	"Blood Moon"	Cameron Welsh	David Paul Francis	August 7, 2019	U13.13459	0.29
Lyta reveals that Dru-Zod is using the Black Mercy on Doomsday to control him, so Seg and Nyssa fly to Wegthor to warn the rebels before Doomsday's arrival, while Jayna and Dev stay back in the Outlands to tend to Lyta's recovery. Seg reaches Val and warns him about Doomsday's attack, who plans to lure Doomsday into the tunnels and detonate explosives to seal the entrance of the base and entrap the monster. Doomsday eventually arrives on Wegthor under Zod's control, slaughtering rebels as he makes his way into their base. One of Doomsday's attacks knocks out Wegthor's power grid, which shuts off the remote detonation. With no choice, Seg sets off a countdown for the bombs as Nyssa leads the rebels to seize Doomsday's spaceship from Sagitari, but Doomsday reaches Seg's position, causing a cave-in. As Val must free Adam, paralyzed from debris by the cave-in, Kem carries Seg to an escape tunnel to fly out on his skimmer, and dies upon returning to detonate the bombs to entrap Doomsday as the rebels lift-off from the planet. Flying away, Val underestimated the magnitude of the explosion, watching it cascading as the rebels to witness Wegthor's destruction from space.
20	10	"The Alpha and the Omega"	Ruba Nadda	Story by : Cameron Welsh; Teleplay by : Luke Kalteux & Cameron Welsh	August 14, 2019	U13.13460	0.35
As Wegthor's remnants rain upon Krypton, Dev and Jayna debate their next action, Lyta denounces Dru-Zod, and Seg contacts Val's ship to report Kem's fate. Nyssa manipulates a drugged Adam for his Zeta-Beam Teleporter in order to find baby Jor-El, beginning on Rann. Searching for Sardath, Nyssa discovers the world's defenders slaughtered by Thanagarians. As Adam expresses how House El is his first real family, the rebels learn from Lyta's spies that Zod's troops are killing dissenters. Aiming to keep Zod's Sagitari engaged in the Outlands, Seg enters Kandor to publicly face Zod, as Lyta arrives and exposes him. The Sagitari side with Lyta, who fights alongside Seg to force Zod into submission. The Sagitari are ordered to cease fire on the Rebels, and Zod is enthralled with the Black Mercy to peacefully end his reign. Celebrating, Val gives Adam a walking apparatus, while Dev and Jayna find Doomsday encased in Stallarium. As Lobo crashes the party still searching for Brainiac, Seg offers to help in exchange for his son's return. In space, Brainiac claims Jor-El as his own, taking him to Earth where he will become a "god amongst men".

== Production ==
=== Development ===
In October 2014, David S. Goyer was developing a prequel television series titled Krypton. The series was in development by Syfy network, produced by Goyer and written and executive produced by Ian Goldberg. Damian Kindler was the showrunner with Goyer as co-executive producer. Syfy tweeted a debut of the show in 2018. Hawkwoman was originally considered to appear in the series, but was later decided by the showrunners not to include her in the first season of the series due to her not fitting into the ongoing storylines.

Syfy renewed Krypton for a second season, which premiered on June 12, 2019. Soon after its broadcast, Syfy canceled the series after two seasons in August.

=== Casting ===
The casting process began in 2016 and finished in 2018.

Georgina Campbell was first cast as Lyta Zod. Shaun Sipos was cast as Adam Strange. Strange was intended by the show's creators to be an LGBTQ+ character, but this was only implied following alleged interference from former DC executive Geoff Johns. Cameron Cuffe was cast as Seg-El. Regé-Jean Page auditioned for the role but was not cast because Johns reportedly believed the character had to resemble Superman actor Henry Cavill due to initial fan perception that the show could serve as a possible prequel to the 2013 film Man of Steel. Alongside Cameron Cuffe, other actors Ian McElhinney, Elliot Cowan, Ann Ogbomo, Rasmus Hardiker, Wallis Day, and Aaron Pierre were cast as Val-El, Daron-Vex, Jayna-Zod, Kem, Nyssa-Vex, and Dev-Em. Blake Ritson was cast as Brainiac.

Paula Malcomson was cast as Charys, while Hannah Waddingham was cast as Jax-Ur. Emmett J. Scanlan was cast as Lobo for the second season.

=== Filming ===
In June 2016, production on the pilot was slated to begin later in the year in Montreal. By September, the pilot was filmed in Serbia by Colm McCarthy. The second season began filming in October 2018 in Belfast and wrapped on March 3, 2019.

== Release ==
=== Broadcast ===
Krypton's first season premiered on March 21, 2018 and concluded on May 23 with a total of ten episodes. The second season premiered on June 12, 2019.

The first season became available on DC's streaming service DC Universe on April 5, 2019, with the second season airing on August 11, 2020.

=== Home media ===
The first season was released on DVD and Blu-Ray on March 5, 2019. The second season was released on DVD and Blu-ray on January 14, 2020.

== Other media ==
In 2018, DC debuted a comic book version of Krypton featuring the show's cast on the cover for Free Comic Book Day. An after show titled Decrypting Krypton premiered on Syfy on March 21, following Krypton's premiere episode. Decrypting Krypton featured host Matt Hiscox discussing the latest episode with fans, actors, and producers of Krypton.

== Reception ==
=== Critical reception ===
The first season holds a score of 60% on Rotten Tomatoes, based on 42 reviews, with an average rating of 6.26/10. Rotten Tomatoes's critical consensus reads: "Krypton's eccentricity declines into silliness with a dull narrative that fails to fulfill a promising premise". On Metacritic, the series has a weighted average score of 53 out of 100, based on 14 critics, indicating "mixed or average reviews".

A 100% approval rating for the second season was reported by Rotten Tomatoes, with an average rating of 7.96/10 based on 10 reviews. Its critical consensus reads: "Fresh faces, exceptional performances, and a more clearly defined sense of purpose help Krypton find its footing".

=== Ratings ===
==== Season 1 ====
Viewership and ratings per episode of Krypton
No.	Title	Air date	Rating (18–49)	Viewers (millions)	DVR (18–49)	DVR viewers (millions)	Total (18–49)	Total viewers (millions)
1	"Pilot"	March 21, 2018	0.4	1.32	0.5	1.59	0.9	2.91
2	"House of El"	March 28, 2018	0.3	1.07	0.4	1.43	0.7	2.50
3	"The Rankless Initiative"	April 4, 2018	0.3	0.95	0.4	1.30	0.7	2.25
4	"The Word of Rao"	April 11, 2018	0.3	0.87	0.3	1.26	0.6	2.11
5	"House of Zod"	April 18, 2018	0.2	0.72	—N/a	—N/a	—N/a	—N/a
6	"Civil Wars"	April 25, 2018	0.2	0.60	0.3	1.08	0.5	1.68
7	"Transformation"	May 2, 2018	0.2	0.63	—N/a	—N/a	—N/a	—N/a
8	"Savage Night"	May 9, 2018	0.2	0.53	0.3	0.99	0.5	1.52
9	"Hope"	May 16, 2018	0.2	0.61	—N/a	—N/a	—N/a	—N/a
10	"The Phantom Zone"	May 23, 2018	0.1	0.56	0.4	0.91	0.5	1.47

==== Season 2 ====
Viewership and ratings per episode of Krypton
No.	Title	Air date	Rating (18–49)	Viewers (millions)	DVR (18–49)	DVR viewers (millions)	Total (18–49)	Total viewers (millions)
1	"Light-Years From Home"	June 12, 2019	0.1	0.48	—N/a	0.45	—N/a	0.93
2	"Ghost In The Fire"	June 19, 2019	0.1	0.43	0.2	0.59	0.3	1.02
3	"Will To Power"	June 26, 2019	0.1	0.49	—N/a	0.53	—N/a	1.02
4	"Danger Close"	July 3, 2019	0.1	0.45	—N/a	0.45	—N/a	0.90
5	"A Better Yesterday"	July 10, 2019	0.1	0.38	—N/a	0.44	—N/a	0.82
6	"In Zod We Trust"	July 17, 2019	0.1	0.37	—N/a	0.45	—N/a	0.82
7	"Zods and Monsters"	July 24, 2019	0.1	0.46	—N/a	0.43	—N/a	0.89
8	"Mercy"	July 31, 2019	0.1	0.38	—N/a	0.45	—N/a	0.83
9	"Blood Moon"	August 7, 2019	0.1	0.29	—N/a	0.45	—N/a	0.74
10	"The Alpha and the Omega"	August 14, 2019	0.1	0.35	—N/a	0.41	—N/a	0.76

=== Accolades ===
Year	Award	Category	Recipient(s) and nominee(s)	Result	Ref(s)
2019	Visual Effects Society Awards	Outstanding Visual Effects in a Photoreal Episode	Ian Markiewicz, Jennifer Wessner, Niklas Jacobson, Martin Pelletier (for "The Phantom Zone")	Nominated	
2019	Saturn Awards	Best Science Fiction TV Series	Krypton	Nominated	
2019	Saturn Awards	Best Performance by a Younger Actor on a Television Series	Cameron Cuffe	Nominated	

== Cancelled spin-off ==
In June 2019, Syfy announced a spin-off based on Lobo, which was to be produced by Cameron Welsh, who also executive produced Krypton. Two months later, the spin-off project was cancelled along with Krypton after two seasons.
