= Ann Ogbomo =

English actress

- Born: England
- Occupation: Actress

Ann Ogbomo is an English actress. She is known for her multiple roles in DC Comics live-action adaptations, such as Philippus in the DC Extended Universe films Wonder Woman (2017), Justice League (2017), and Zack Snyder's Justice League (2021), Jayna-Zod in the Syfy series Krypton (2018–2019), and Gault in the Netflix series The Sandman (2022).

== Education ==
Ogbomo obtained her BA in theatre Arts from Middlesex University, her MA in community Arts from Goldsmiths University, her PGA in teaching Shakespeare from University of Warwick and trained as an actor at the London Academy of Music and Dramatic Art.

== Career ==
From 2006 to 2008, Ogbomo was part of the Olivier Histories Ensemble at the Royal Shakespeare Company (RSC). She also performed in fifteen productions of Shakespeare for various theatre companies including the Royal National Theatre, Shakespeare's Globe and RSC, and she is an educational practitioner at these theatres.

Ogbomo appeared in World War Z (2013) as a Camp Humphreys soldier, Honeytrap (2014) as Lorna, Julius Caesar, Wild Target, Bouquet of Barbed Wire (2010) as Monique, The No. 1 Ladies Detective Agency (2009) as Clara, Casualty, Holby City, The Bill, Murder in Mind, and Hardware.

Ogbomo played the Amazon warrior Philippus in the 2017 films Wonder Woman and Justice League. In 2018, she starred as Jayna-Zod in the SyFy series Krypton.

== Filmography ==
=== Television ===
Year	Title	Role	Notes
2008–2009	The No. 1 Ladies' Detective Agency	Clara	
2010	Bouquet of Barbed Wire	Monique	
2018–2019	Krypton	Jayna-Zod	
2022	The Sandman	Gault	2 episodes

=== Film ===
Year	Title	Role	Notes
2013	World War Z	Camp Humphrey's Soldier #2	
2014	Honeytrap	Lorna	
2017	Wonder Woman	Philippus	
2017	Justice League	Philippus	
2021	Zack Snyder's Justice League	Philippus	
