= Philippus (character) =

Philippus of Themyscira
- Philippus as depicted in Wonder Woman vol. 2 #186 (December 2002). Art by Phil Jimenez.

Publication information
- Publisher: DC Comics
- First appearance: Wonder Woman (vol. 2) #1 (Feb. 1987)
- Created by: George Pérez (writer/artist)

In-story information
- Alter ego: Philippus
- Species: Themyscirian Amazon
- Team affiliations: Amazons; Bana-Mighdall
- Notable aliases: Chancellor, Archon Eponymous
- Abilities: Trained in high levels of hand-to-hand combat; Expertise in a wide array of weapons; Immortality; Accelerated healing; Limited super-strength; Limited durability; Enhanced reflexes/agility

Philippus is a fictional character created by DC Comics. She made her first appearance in February 1987 as an Amazon character in the Wonder Woman comic book. The character was created by writer/artist George Pérez.

Philippus made her live action debut in the DC Extended Universe films Wonder Woman, Justice League, and Zack Snyder's Justice League, played by Ann Ogbomo.

== Fictional character biography ==
=== Amazon origin ===
A select few of the Olympian gods, including Artemis, Athena, Hestia, Demeter and Aphrodite, took the souls of women slain by men throughout time and sent them to the bottom of the Aegean Sea 3,000 years ago. The souls then began to form bodies out of clay on the sea bed, which formed into the Amazons. Philippus was one of these new race of women. The first to break surface was Hippolyta and thus she was titled as Queen of the new race. The second Amazon to break surface was Hippolyta's sister Antiope and she ruled as a second to her in all affairs. Each of the goddesses that created the Amazons blessed them with personalized gifts: hunting skills (Artemis), wisdom (Athena), warm homes (Hestia), plentiful harvests (Demeter), and beauty inside and out (Aphrodite). The Amazons eventually founded the city of Themyscira in Anatolia and became known as fierce warriors of peace in Turkey, Greece, and Rome.

=== Downfall ===
The jealous and vengeful god Ares soon after tried to discredit the Amazon's name by having his half-brother demi-god Heracles invade the Amazons and demean their standing by stealing Hippolyta's symbol of power: the Golden Girdle of Gaea. When Heracles first approached the Amazons seeking battle, Hippolyta met him outside the city gates and tried to reason with him for peaceful negotiations. When this did not work Heracles attacked the Amazon Queen using his strength to his advantage. Hippolyta easily turned the tables on him by using her wisdom and battle skills to subdue him. Still wishing peace, Hippolyta invited Heracles and his men into their city to celebrate a potential friendship with a feast. Hiding his anger, Heracles accepted the invitation.

Once in their stronghold, Heracles and his men drugged the wine the Amazons were drinking and took them prisoner. After the theft of Hippolyta's Golden Girdle and abuse and rape of the Amazons, Hippolyta cried out to Athena to help them escape their bonds. Athena said that she would only aid them on the condition that the Amazons not seek retribution against Heracles and his men as that would be beneath the ideals the Amazons were created to stand for. Hippolyta hastily agreed and the Amazon's bonds were broken and the drugs given wore off. Once out of their drugged state the Amazons were filled with hate and revenge. Breaking Hippolyta's oath to Athena, the Amazons began slaughtering their captors but were upset to find that Heracles and his general Theseus had returned to their homelands. Philippus was especially affected by the abuse as she no longer truly trusted the male species since.

After the slaughter Athena reprimanded the Amazons for disobeying her orders. She demanded the Amazons serve penance for their actions. Though Hippolyta agreed to the goddess' wishes, her sister Antiope scoffed at Athena for being angered at them for killing their rapist captors. Antiope then denounced all ties to the Olympian gods and said goodbye to her sister Hippolyta, giving Hippolyta her Golden Girdle of Gaea to replace the one stolen by Heracles. She left for Greece, along with half of the Amazon Nation who supported Antiope in her new quest to battle Heracles and Theseus out of vengeance and to replace Antiope's girdle with Hippolyta's. Antiope's tribe later became the Amazons of Bana-Mighdall.

=== Godly penance ===
Philippus and the remaining faithful Amazons then went to the sea shore where the Olympian Gods told them their punishment for going against their ideals. They were to be given immortality so that they would forever safeguard a doorway to the underworld called Doom's Doorway. Not only must they protect anyone from entering, but they must also vanquish any evils that try to escape. The doorway was on a far-off isolated island and it would take some time to get there. To guide their way, the god Poseidon cleared a pathway for them across the seas. Once they arrived at the island the Amazons created a new city and named their new home Themyscira, after their previous fallen city. This way of life continued for 3,000 years.

After the Captain of the Guard named Egeria was killed while stopping a monster from escaping from Doom's Doorway, Philippus became the rank of captain in Egeria's place due to her results in a tournament. Philippus took the job very seriously and later became General of Hippolyta's armies. Though Philippus has always respected and revered her Queen, over time Philippus' feelings for Hippolyta grew into love. Whether that love became physical at all over the 3,000 years on the island has never been revealed.

=== Life on the island ===
During the 1940s while guarding Doom's Doorway yet another creature attempted to escape. Unbeknowest to the island's citizens an American woman named Diana Rockwell Trevor crash landed on the island. While exploring the island she discovered the Amazons battling the creature. She used her hand gun to temporarily stop the monster from killing Philippus. The creature was able to kill Diana though but her distraction allowed the Amazons to finally defeat the creature and seal the doorway again. The Amazons held the stranger in high regard once things settled. Philippus particularly felt indebted to Diana and later learned how to use the hand gun.

Philippus was constantly at odds with Hippolyta's personal bodyguards known as The Circle: Alkyone, Myrto, Charis, and Philomela. While Hippolyta saw their devotion as endearing, Philippus saw through their insanity and gave them little respect. They in turn showed the same hostility toward Philippus. When Hippolyta was given her daughter Diana as a gift from the gods Philippus openly loved the new Princess as did most of the Amazons on the island. She could see though that the child's presence greatly disturbed the Queen's bodyguards and took it upon herself to watch them at all times. When Philippus suspected Alkyone was going to kill Diana while Hippolyta slept, she attempted to stop them beforehand but was overwhelmed by them instead. When she regained her physical composure Philippus called for the royal guard and had them imprison Hippolyta's bodyguards forever.

=== Diana ===
Philippus took an active role in the raising of the Princess. Over the years she helped Hippolyta teach Diana the ways of the Amazons. When Diana grew to an age where she used her gods given powers too off-handedly it was Philippus who went to Hippolyta to ask if she could teach Diana the lesson of humility. She arranged for a series of physical tests for Diana. In one situation she had a group of masked Amazons ambush Diana. When Diana used her powers to defeat the attackers soundly instead of more gently disable them Philippus had Diana remove the masks from the unconscious victims. Diana was horrified to discover that the attackers were in fact Diana's most cherished Amazon "sister". Philippus then arranged for a large boulder to roll toward a group of unaware Amazons. When Diana went to hold back the boulder with her strength Philippus shot Diana in the leg with an arrow. Both these situations taught Diana to use her mind instead of her fists when confronted with a dilemma.

In the 1980s Steve Trevor, the son of Diana Rockwell Trevor, crash landed on Themyscira. Resentful at the presence of a man on the island due to her previous rape and slavery at the hands of Herakles' men thousands of years prior, Philippus was openly vocal about wanting Steve killed. Hippolyta felt otherwise and called for a Contest to have the most skilled Amazon escort the man back to his homeland. A disguised Diana became the Contest winner, which caused heartache to both Hippolyta and Philippus. As the last trial of the Contest, Philippus used Diana Rockwell Trevor's hand gun on Princess Diana to see if she was skilled enough to deflect the bullets. The Princess was able to deflect each one and went into Man's World with Steve.

Diana returned to the island on several occasions. During one visit the Olympian god Zeus attempted to rape Diana. When Hippolyta defied the Olympian, Philippus advised the Queen not to put the rest of the island at risk. For defying the gods Diana was ordered to go into Doom's Doorway to defeat the creatures there on her way to an ultimate truth. Even though no one was allowed to aid Diana on this mission Hippolyta defied the gods again and attempted to enter behind her. Philippus begged Hippolyta not to enter. Hippolyta refused causing Philippus to tell her that felt obligated to stop her even though she felt anguish in battling someone she loved so dearly. Hippolyta defeated Philippus and aided Diana on her mission anyway. The two later forgave each other.

=== Changes ===
Hippolyta declared that Princess Diana was to act as Themyscira's Ambassador. Because of Diana's actions with the outside world Hippolyta also decided to open their borders to outsiders as a gesture of peace. Philippus and several other Amazons escorted Hippolyta to the U.S. for a promotional tour. The witch Circe arranged for the Amazons of Bana-Mighdall to ambush the Themyscirian Amazons and sabotage their mission by creating chaos in their name. The plan worked and Philippus was seriously injured. Seen as a dangerous terrorist, Philippus was hospitalized under strict armed guard. Diana as Wonder Woman was able to clear things up but the event left a scar on the trust the Amazons had offered the outside world. The Amazons eventually returned to a life of isolation on Themyscira.

Some time later the Amazons of Bana-Mighdall were magically transported to Themyscira by the witch Circe. Once there the Egyptian Amazons attacked the Themyscirian Amazons to claim the island as their own. During the battle Circe double-crossed the Banas and sent the entire island of Themyscira into a demon dimension along with both tribes of Amazons. The two tribes put aside their rivalry to defend themselves against the demons. Once the island was returned to its original setting the Bana Amazons were given a small portion of the island to dwell while the remaining Themyscirian Amazons lived in the city walls. Hippolyta received visions during this period that Wonder Woman would die. Because of this she had Philippus arrange for a new contest for the title of Wonder Woman. Philippus was instructed to place deadfalls along the contest route to slow down Diana so that others might have a chance at winning. Philippus was appalled at Hippolyta's wishes but followed her Queen's orders. Because of these actions the Bana Amazon Artemis won the title to be the new Wonder Woman.

Diana had a huge falling out with her mother and left the island in anger. Because of this Hippolyta fell into depression and went mildly insane. Philippus took a more active role in overseeing the island because of this. Later, when Hippolyta discovered her plotting caused the death of Artemis her shame grew to the point where she felt she couldn't lead her people anymore. Hippolyta officially gave rule of Themyscira over to Philippus and banished herself in a small one person-sized boat. Philippus took her rule seriously but later admitted to Diana that she was more comfortable guiding the Amazon armies at war time than she did the day-to-day rule of an entire nation. When Diana refused to take over rule of the island Philippus reluctantly continued to serve as regent Queen.

=== Chancellor Philippus ===
Hippolyta eventually returned to Themyscira and took back her crown. Civil war then broke out between both island tribes due to the fluctuating rule and growing tensions. To end the war, Diana and Hippolyta denounced their crowns and gave over the island to Philippus and a resurrected Artemis to act as co-rulers. Philippus was given the title of Chancellor and Archon Eponymous, whereas Artemis was given the title of Polemarch. It is explained that Archon Eponymous equates to the Civic Office of a Presidential title, whereas the position of Polemarch translates to War Leader, similar to the position of Commander-In-Chief. During their official rule they opened the island to outworlders, both on Earth and alien worlds. When the alien being Imperiex invaded Earth during the Our Worlds at War storyline the Amazons joined in the battle which led to Hippolyta's death. This devastated Philippus who took greater ferocity in ending the battle. It was here that Philippus admitted her feelings for Hippolyta.

Diana stayed on as the island's Ambassador. Because of the Goddess Hera a large tsunami was close to landing on America's shores. It was stopped by Wonder Woman but the event caused the U.S. to suspect the Amazons to have ill will towards them. The U.S. president, Jonathan Vincent Horne, had Naval battleships position themselves around Themyscira in defense. Wishing to ease tensions, Philippus, Artemis and Diana met with the U.S. president. He agreed to remove the battleships if the Amazons agreed to transfer blue prints on how to create their own Purple Ray. Believing the U.S. would use the Purple Ray as a weapon, the Amazons gave a firm "no" in response. Because of this political tensions remained between the two nations.

Through the machinations of an A.I. satellite called Brother Eye, a military strike was made against Themyscira in an attempt at Amazon genocide. A large swarm of OMAC units were sent to the island and began to attack the Amazons as part of the events of Infinite Crisis. Because of this, as well as the many previous attacks against the island since Diana had become Wonder Woman, it was decided by Philippus and Artemis that the entire island of Themyscira and all of its inhabitants (sans Diana) would be transported to a hidden dimension via the Olympian and Bana-Mighdallian goddesses. Philippus and the remaining Amazons thrive in this dimension for a year's time in peace.

=== Amazons Attack ===
The witch Circe later entered the Amazons' protected dimension and revived Queen Hippolyta from death. Circe informed the Amazons that Diana was being illegally detained by the U.S. government and tortured until she gave them the secrets of the Purple Ray. Because of this, the Amazons agreed to give Hippolyta her royal title back, and followed her instructions to invade Washington, D.C. which brought about the events of Amazons Attack. Artemis and Philippus were assigned to oversee the battle, but soon lost faith in Hippolyta when they discovered some of her actions against Man's World proved to be less honorable. Due to their failure to follow-through in stopping Hippolyta during the war, a disguised Granny Goodness cursed all of the Amazons by erasing their memories and scattering them across the globe with false personas.

With the return of the Olympian gods, Zeus revives the Amazon's memories several months after their memory wipes and has them return to Themyscira. With the creation of the Gargareans, Zeus had these new male Amazons live on both the island of Thalarion and Themyscira. Their leader Achilles was given rule over both his people and the original Amazons. To add insult to injury Achilles chose Philippus' old rival Alkyone to become his Queen. This infuriated Philippus who continued to refer to Hippolyta as her Queen. Once the Amazon Artemis returned to the island she helped to organize a coup against the mad Queen Alkyone. Joined by Achilles and his people, the coup was successful and Hippolyta was re-crowned as Queen of the Amazons.

=== Rebirth ===
After the events of DC Rebirth, Philippus returned as a prominent Amazon in Diana's life. As the General of the Amazons, Philippus was charged with training Diana in battle. She also became romantically involved with Queen Hippolyta (though it's not confirmed whether she's a lesbian or bisexual).

== Powers and abilities ==
Philippus has 3,000 years of combat experience providing her expertise in both hand-to-hand combat as well as with hand-held weapons. As a Themyscirian Amazon she also possesses immortality that allows her to live indefinitely in a youthful form, but does leave her open to potential injury and death depending on her actions. Philippus, as a Themyscirian, also possesses enhanced strength and intelligence. As shown by fellow members of her tribe, she has the capability to break apart steel and concrete with her bare hands, jump over 12 feet from a standing position, has a high durability factor, enhanced healing, and the ability to absorb and process a vast amount of knowledge in a short period of time.

Philippus, in addition to all the Themyscirian Amazons, also possesses the ability to relieve her body of physical injury and toxins by becoming one with the Earth's soil and then reforming her body whole again. The first time Diana does this she prays to her god Gaea saying: "Gaea, I pray to you. Grant me your strength. You are the Earth who suckled me, who nurtured and bred me. Through you all life is renewed. The circle which never ends. I pray you, mother Gaea, take me into your bosom. Please, let me be worthy". During writer John Byrne's time on the comic it was stated that this is a very sacred ritual to the Themyscirians, only to be used in the most dire of circumstances.

== Other versions ==
=== Odyssey ===
In the alternate timeline of Odyssey, Philippus was one of the few surviving Amazons that protected Wonder Woman. She was later killed by the centaur Cernunnos during battle.

=== Flashpoint ===
In the alternate timeline of the Flashpoint event, Philippus is protector of Wonder Woman. Later, she mistakenly killed Garth, who had been himself framed by Artemis for the murder of Hippolyta. Later, Philippus is found killed by the Atlanteans, before Artemis has bombs dropped on Themyscira.

=== The Legend of Wonder Woman ===
Philippus appears in this alternate re-telling of Wonder Woman's origins.

=== Injustice: Gods Among Us ===
Philippus appears in the comic series based on the Injustice 2 video game. She is also a former lover of Menalippe.

== In other media ==
=== Television ===
- Philippus appears in Justice League (2001), voiced by Julianne Grossman.

=== Film ===
- Phillipus appears in the DC Extended Universe films Wonder Woman (2017), Justice League (2017), and Zack Snyder's Justice League (2021), portrayed by Ann Ogbomo.
