= Batman: The Brave and the Bold (comics) =

American comic book series by DC Comics

Batman: The Brave and the Bold is the name of two American comic book series published by the comic book publishing company DC Comics. The first, published from January 2009 to February 2012, is based on the animated television series of the same name. The second, published from May 2023 to December 2024, is an anthology series featuring characters from across the DC Universe.

== Issues ==
=== Volume 1 (2009–2012) ===
Characters/teams in bold did not appear in the animated television series:

1. "**The Panic of the Composite Creature**" – After teaming up with Aquaman to defeat **Carapax**, Batman and **Power Girl** fight a composite monster (under the control of Lex Luthor) which is on a rampage in England.
2. "**Attack of the Virtual Villains**" – After teaming up with Superman to take down Toyman, Batman and Blue Beetle fight the **Thinker** when trolls and ogres emerge from a video game and attack the real world.
3. "**President Batman**" – After teaming up with Wonder Woman to defeat **Doctor Psycho** (who is accompanied by Clock King, Killer Croc, Scarecrow, and Two-Face), Batman and Green Arrow must protect the President from Ultra-Humanite.
4. "**Menace of the Time Thief**" – After teaming up with Sugar and Spike to defeat Felix Faust, Batman and Aquaman team up to stop **Doctor Cyber** from destroying the time stream.
5. "**The Case of the Fractured Fairy Tale**" – After teaming up with the Haunted Tank to defeat the **Key**, Batman and Captain Marvel team up to stop the **Queen of Fables**, who is abducting children.
6. "**Charge of the Army Eternal**" – After teaming up with Hourman to defeat the Calculator, Batman and **Kid Eternity** team up to fight **General Immortus** (assisted by the Royal Flush Gang). G.I. Robot, **Shining Knight**, Vigilante, and **Viking Prince** make appearances as spirits.
7. "**The Secret of the Doomsday Design**" – After helping **Olympian** defeat Circe, Batman helps the Doom Patrol in fighting **Mad Mod** when he steals the Doom Patrol's clothes and replicates their powers in a plan to integrate them into "suits of doom".
8. "**Batman Vs. The Yeti**" – After helping **Rising Sun** fight a gang of ninjas, Batman teams up with the **Great Ten** to fight an army of yetis.
9. "**The Tale of the Catman**" – After teaming up with many magic-using superheroes (consisting of Doctor Fate, **Doctor Occult**, **Sargon the Sorcerer**, Mento, and Zatanna) to defeat the Void, Batman has an unlikely team-up with Catman in battling various villains.
10. "**Attack of the Colossal Bat-Monster**" – Hugo Strange has turned Batman into a giant monster that rampages through Gotham City. Now the Green Arrow and the Atom must stop the Bat-Monster, change it back to Batman, and defeat Strange.
11. "**The Fearsome Fangs Strike Again**" – After defeating the Sportsmaster with the help of Huntress, Batman and Green Arrow team up to prevent the Terrible Trio from obtaining the Sun Do Shuriken.
12. "**Final Christmas**" – While stopping the Calendar Man's latest scheme, Batman is teleported to Rann to help Adam Strange save the universe, and Christmas, from the **Psions**.
13. "**Night of the Batmen**" – When Batman breaks his leg during a mission with **Angel and the Ape** to apprehend some criminals, Aquaman, Captain Marvel, Green Arrow, and Plastic Man cover for him. This comic was adapted into an episode in the third season of the show, with some differences.
14. "**Captured by Mister Camera**" – After teaming up with Plastic Man to take down the Scarecrow, Batman teams up with Huntress to battle Mr. Camera.
15. "**Minute Mystery**" – After teaming up with **Super-Hip** and **Brother Power the Geek** to stop Mad Mod, Batman and the Flash compete to see who is the "world's fastest detective". The Fiddler, **Paul Gambi**, and Jay Garrick also make appearances.
16. "**Egg Hunt or: The Evil of Egghead**" – Batman must rescue Teen Titans members Kid Flash, **Wonder Girl**, and Speedy from **Nocturna**. When Wonder Girl reveals that Wonder Woman has been trying to contact her afterwards, Batman joins her to fight Egghead and **Egg Fu**.
17. "**A Batman's Work is Never Done**" – A week in the life of Batman takes him on adventures with Metamorpho (against **Mr. Element**), the Green Lantern Corps (against Mongul), **Merry Pemberton** (against Toyman), Jonah Hex and Bat Lash, Hawkman and Etrigan the Demon (against Gentleman Ghost), the **Inferior Five**, and the Creeper (against the Scarecrow).
18. "**All in the Mind**" – Batman teams up with Martian Manhunter to prevent an invasion from Mars by the White Martians.
19. "**Emerald Knight**" – Batman teams up with the Green Lantern Corps to prevent **Cyborg Superman** from killing Hal Jordan and taking over the universe.
20. "**Solving this Mystery... ...Will Take a Miracle**" – Big Barda seeks Batman's help when Mister Miracle goes missing and the Female Furies attack New Genesis.
21. "**The Menace Known as Robert**" – After teaming up with the **Lady Blackhawks** to take down King Rex and his Dinosaur Gang, Batman and Hal Jordan team up to stop a creature that emits yellow energy and can mutate living things who calls himself Robert.
22. "**Atlantis Attacked**" – Batman teams up with Aquaman when the Ocean Master attacks Atlantis.

After issue #22, Batman: The Brave and the Bold was re-branded as The All-New Batman: The Brave and the Bold and started with a new #1. The title dropped The All-New as of #9.

1. "**Bottle of the Planets**" – After teaming up with Black Canary to defeat the Joker, Batman and Superman investigate a string of robberies in Kandor and soon discover that the robberies are committed by **Et-Rog**.
2. "**That Holiday Feeling**" – Batman and Captain Marvel fight the Psycho-Pirate.
3. "**Mirror, Mirror...**" – Batman and Flash fight the Mad Hatter and Mirror Master in a mirror world. Printed over two issues in UK.
4. "**The Bride and the Bold**" – Batman and Wonder Woman are apparently married, but this is caused by Aphrodite to make the two of them fall in love. Even though a wedding is set up, Batman, Wonder Woman, and the superhero guests have to deal with some supervillain wedding crashers.
5. "**Man-hunted**" – Batman and Guy Gardner team up to fight the **Manhunters**.
6. "**Now You See Me**" – Batman and the Martian Manhunter team up to fight Clayface.
7. "**Shadows & Light**" – The teaser features Batman helping the **Teen Titans** against the **Time Trapper**. At the start of his career, Batman encounters Gotham City's original protector, Green Lantern.
8. "**Under The Sea**" – Batman and Aquaman team-up to search for the artifact of the redeeming pirate Captain Fear's ghost and must overcome any obstacles, which also include Black Manta and the Fisherman.
9. "**3:10 To Thanagar**" – When Batman and Hawkman take down a criminal, they must transfer the criminal to Thanagar while preventing the criminal's gang from freeing their leader.
10. "**Help Wanted**" – All Joe wanted was a job and ends up working for different villains (consisting of Calculator, Clock King, Ocean Master, and Toyman) where he has encounters with Batman, Superman, Green Arrow, and Aquaman.
11. "**Out of Time**" – Batman and Jonah Hex end up in 19th-century Gotham City.
12. "**Trick or Treat**" – On Halloween, Batman and Zatanna investigate a break-in at the House of Mystery. They end up dealing with **Klarion the Witch Boy** when he summons the Blockbuster, Dala, **Doctor Destiny**, Hugo Strange, **Man-Bat**, **Monk**, Professor Milo, and Solomon Grundy.
13. "**Batman Dies at Dawn**" – After Nightwing helps Roy Harper defeat the Royal Flush Gang, he is teleported away by the Phantom Stranger who has reached through space and time to gather everyone who has ever been called "Boy Wonder", including **Jason Todd**, **Tim Drake**, **Stephanie Brown**, **Carrie Kelley**, and **Damian Wayne**. Due to Batman being wounded in Crime Alley, the Boy Wonders infiltrate the League of Assassins to gain access to the Lazarus Pits.
14. "**Small Miracles**" – After teaming up with Blue Beetle to fight Crazy Quilt, **Doctor Spectro** and the **Rainbow Raider**, Batman comes to the aid of the **Ragman** when there is unrest in Gotham City's slums during Hanukkah.
15. "**No Exit**" – Mister Miracle ends up coming to the aid of Batman when he ends up in a death trap that he can't get out of. The trap was devised by **DeSaad** and **Doctor Bedlam**.
16. "**Love at First Mite**" (final issue) – On Valentine's Day, Bat-Mite develops a crush on Batgirl. Afterwards, Bat-Mite finds out that the comic is canceled and reflects on the team-ups he will never see (which include the **Dingbats of Danger Street**, **Super-Turtle**, and **Space Cabbie**). Batman reassures him by pointing out that he can still read the back issues.

For Free Comic Book Day of 2011, a one-shot titled Young Justice/Batman: The Brave and the Bold: Super Sampler was published containing an exclusive story.

1. "**Let Me Tell You About Bruce Wayne**" – Batman and the Flash team up to put out fires started by Heat Wave, who has teamed up with Firefly. While the fight is going on, there is a charity ball in Gotham City, where some Gothamites are discussing why Bruce Wayne has not shown up with a donation.

=== Volume 2 (2023–2024) ===
- **Animal Girl**
  - "**Hive Mind**": #19–20
- **Aquaman**
  - "**Communion**": #7–9
- **Aquaman & Miss Martian**
  - "**Reflections**": #18
- **Artemis**
  - "**The Poison Within**": #10–13
- **Bat Lash**
  - "**The Sweet Science**": #11
- **Batman**
  - "**Black and White**": #1–14
  - "**Doubt**": #18
  - "**Enter the Abyss**": #4
  - "**The Hum**": #19
  - "**Leftovers**": #19
  - "**Mr. Baseball**": #3
  - "**Mother's Day**": #10–12
  - "**The Price**": #20
  - "**Pygmalion**": #6–8
  - "**The Tattoo**": #20
  - "**What's a Calendar**": #17
  - "**The Winning Card**": #1–2, #5, #9
- **Batman & Guy Gardner**
  - "**The Invader**": #13–15
- **Booster Gold**
  - "**Time Jerks**": #13–15
- **Bumblebee & Guardian**
  - "**It's Our Anniversary**": #16
- **False-Face**
  - "**Left Unsaid**": #12
- **The Flash**
  - "**A Day in the Life**": #14
- **Green Arrow & Shazam**
  - "**Downtime at the Diner**": #17
- **Harcourt**
  - "**Second Life**": #4–6
- **Harley Quinn**
  - "**Swipe Left on Scams**": #18
- **John Constantine & Streaky the Supercat**
  - "**Petsurrection**": #17–18
- **Lois Lane**
  - "**The Game**": #10
- **Man-Bat**
  - "**Bats Again: A Microstory**": #17
- **Nightwing & Deadman**
  - "**Down the Road**": #13–16
- **Onomatopoeia**
  - "**Keep it Down**": #20
- **Plastic Man** **& Wonder Woman**
  - "**Man's Underworld**": #19–20
- **The Question**
  - "**Duality**": #15–17
- **Robin**
  - "**Robin Season**": #18–19
- **Sgt. Rock**
  - "**Private Stein**": #11
- **Signal**
  - "**Nameless**": #10
- **StormWatch**
  - "**Down With the Kings**": #1–6
- **Superman**
  - "**First Watch**": #16
  - "**Order of the Black Lamp**": #1–3
- **Swamp Thing**
  - "**A Parting Gift**": #12
- **Wild Dog**
  - "**Here Comes Trouble!**": #7–9

== Collected editions ==
#	Title	Material collected	Pages	Publication date	ISBN
Batman: The Brave and the Bold (vol. 1)
1	Batman: The Brave and the Bold	Batman: The Brave and the Bold (vol. 1) #1–6	128	January 13, 2010	978-1401226503
2	The Fearsome Fang Strikes Again	Batman: The Brave and the Bold (vol. 1) #7–12	128	November, 17. 2010	978-1401228965
3	Emerald Knight	Batman: The Brave and the Bold (vol. 1) #13–14, #16, #18–19, #21	128	May 25, 2011	978-1401231439
All New Batman: The Brave and the Bold
1	All-New Batman: The Brave and the Bold	All-New Batman: The Brave and the Bold #1–6	128	September 28, 2011	978-1401232726
2	Help Wanted	All-New Batman: The Brave and the Bold #7–12	128	August 22, 2012	978-1401235246
3	Small Miracles	Batman: The Brave and the Bold (vol. 1) #15, #17; All-New Batman: The Brave and the Bold #13–16	128	March 13, 2013	978-1401238520
Batman: The Brave and the Bold (vol. 2)
1	The Winning Card	"Batman: The Winning Card" (#1–2, #5, #9)	112	April 2, 2024	978-1779529053
2	Out of the Darkness	"Batman: Pygmalion" (#6–8); "Superman: Order of the Black Lamp" (#1–3); "Batman: Mr. Baseball" (#3); "Harcourt: Second Life" (#4–6); "Wild Dog: Here Comes Trouble!" (#7–9)	176	April 22, 2025	978-1799501121
3	Legends of Justice	"Batman: Mother's Day" (#10–12); "Artemis: The Poison Within" (#10–13); "Aquaman: Communion" (#7–9); "Signal: Nameless" (#10); "Bat Lash: The Sweet Science" (#11); "Sgt. Rock: Private Stein" (#11)	192	August 12, 2025	978-1799506775
4	Across the Universe	"Nightwing & Deadman: Down the Road" (#13–16); "Booster Gold: Time Jerks" (#13–15); "Batman & Guy Gardner: The Invader" (#13–15)	168	October 28, 2025	978-1799502852

== UK title ==
Batman: The Brave and the Bold (UK)
- Editor: Ned Hartley
- Categories: Action/adventure
- Frequency: Monthly
- First issue: 11 March 2010
- Final issue: August 2014
- Company: Titan Magazines
- Country: UK
- Language: English
- Website: Comic website

The UK version was published by Titan Magazines from March 2010 to August 2014, lasting for 55 issues. It reprinted comic strips previously featured in the original American comic book but also added extra content including puzzles, profiles and other special features. Because of these extra features, the short opening scenes from the comic strips were sometimes cut, but this did not affect the over-all story, as the opening scenes were usually unrelated to the main story. A free gift was also added. It was Titan Magazines' third Batman comic alongside Batman Legends and DC Universe Presents Batman Superman and was the first to be aimed at a younger audience.
