= DC Universe Presents Batman Superman =

- Editor: Andrew James
- Categories: Action and adventure
- Frequency: Monthly
- First issue: September 2007
- Final issue: March 2008
- Company: Titan Magazines
- Country: United Kingdom
- Language: English

DC Universe Presents Batman Superman was part of the 'Collector's Edition' line of DC Comics anthologies published monthly in the UK by Titan Magazines from September 2007 to March 2008. It reprinted DC Comics titles from the United States featuring Batman, Superman and related characters from the DC Universe and accompanied Batman Legends, Justice League Legends and Superman Legends as the fourth DC Collectors' Edition published by Titan.

DC Universe Presents Batman Superman was ultimately cancelled with issue #7 due to lack of sales.

== Format ==
Following a similar format to the Marvel Collector's Editions published in the UK by Panini Comics, each issue was 76 pages long, typically reprinted three modern stories and was sold once every 28 days through UK newsagents. Each issue also included the 'Roll Call' feature found in each of Titan's monthly DC titles, which spotlighted various DC graphic novels and included a 'Hero of the Month' panel.

== Printed material ==
Stories that were printed in DC Universe Presents Batman Superman were:

- Issues 1-6: "The Enemies Among Us" from Superman/Batman
- Issues 1-7: Supergirl
- Issues 1-6: The Brave and the Bold
- Issue 7: Legends of the Dark Knight #214
- Issue 7: All-Flash

== See also ==
- Batman Legends
- DC Universe Presents
- Batman The Brave and the Bold
