= List of The New 52 imprint publications =

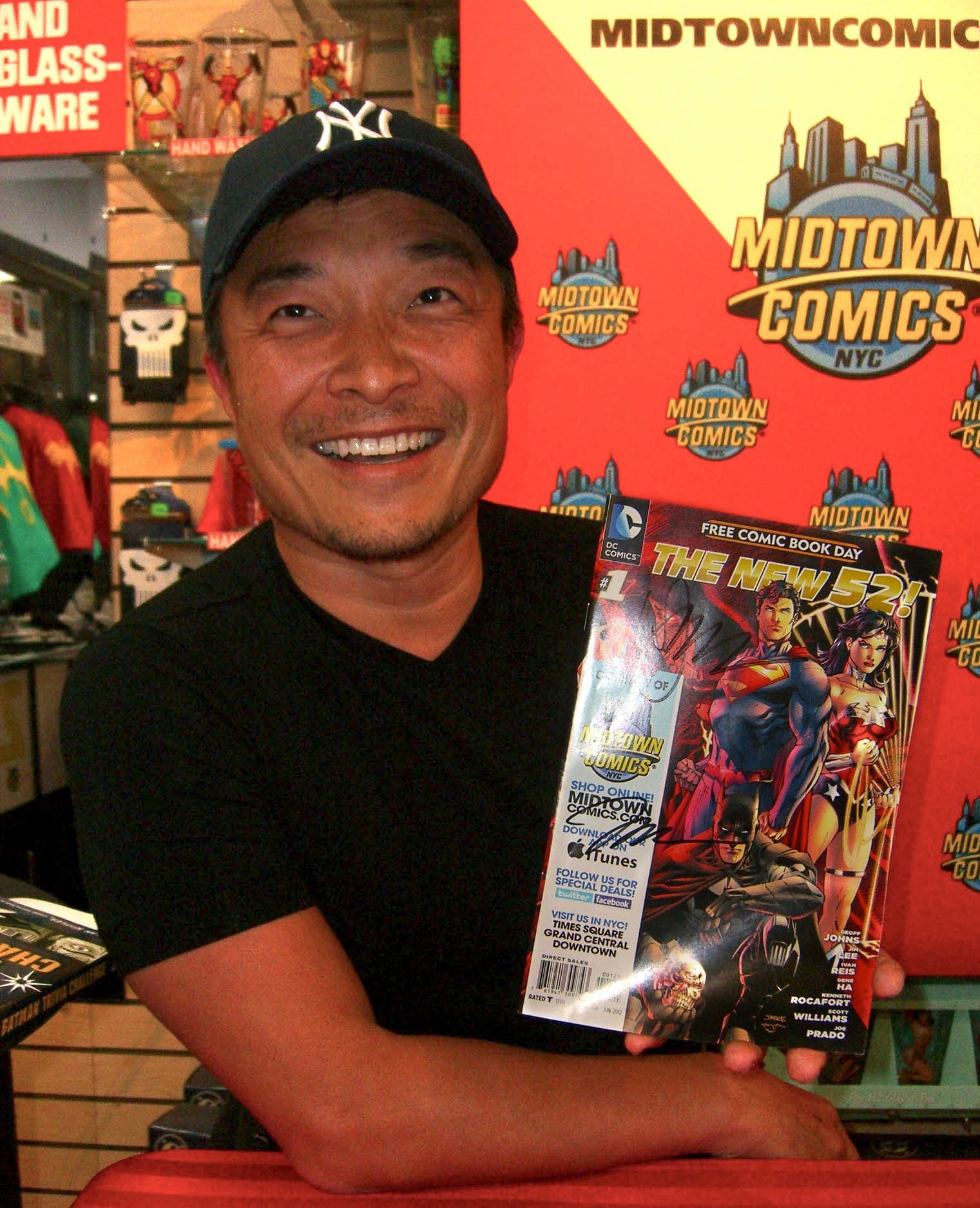
DC Comics artist Jim Lee holding a copy of The New 52 2012 Free Comic Book Day issue.

In September 2011, DC Comics relaunched their entire line of publications, dubbing the new publishing initiative as The New 52. The relaunch saw DC introduce same-day release of physical comics with digital platforms, as well as characters from the former WildStorm and Vertigo imprints being absorbed into a rebooted DC Universe. The intent was to publish 52 ongoing titles each month across the DC Universe. However, DC has also counted one-shots, miniseries and maxiseries in that number. In subsequent Septembers following the launch, DC has featured unique publishing initiatives to commemorate the relaunch. DC released a total of 93 ongoing titles across multiple "wave" releases, until June 2015, when it discontinued the "New 52" branding. To expand The New 52 universe, DC also released 22 one-shots, 17 miniseries and three maxiseries.

== Ongoing series ==
The New 52 ongoing series are organized under seven different "families," grouping similar characters or themes within the books together. By the release of the October 2013 solicitations, DC was no longer grouping the titles by these families. They instead began releasing one larger solicit, titled "The New 52 Group". However, titles that were not participating in an event for the month, such as "Forever Evil", were still grouped together in the larger solicit by the previous family headings. In September 2014, DC co-publisher Dan DiDio spoke about classifying the titles into the families, saying, "one of the things we did, when we launched the New 52, we broke those classifications up in a way that we were able to draw attention to all the characters. So we put them in groupings so we would be able to promote and help them draw attention in groups. It was never made to be a certain amount different stuff. [sic] We always want to have different styles of product... with a lot of characters, we're careful. Things like Frankenstein and Grifter and Voodoo and things of that nature, which were really risky characters and risky chances for us to take, and we're very happy to do them. Even though they didn't work, we knew there was value in those characters... We think they brought a lot of value to the launch. They brought a lot of breadth and depth to the line of books, and a diversity to the line. We didn't want to put them out and then forget about them. It was very important to make sure that they were prominent in other series, and that's why we put them in" other series.

In May 2012, DC cancelled titles from the initial launch (which had been dubbed the "First Wave") and launched new titles, which would become "Second Wave" titles. DC continued to use the "wave" format of introducing new titles, which occasionally corresponded with titles being canceled, to "constantly refresh the line". A "Third Wave" began in September 2012, while the "Fourth Wave" saw titles launching from January 2013 to March 2013. The "Fifth Wave" of new titles took place from May 2013 to July 2013. The first phase of The New 52 concluded in March 2014, at the end of "Forever Evil", with a new phase beginning in April 2014. In June 2015, after the Convergence miniseries, DC no longer used the "New 52" name to brand their books; however the continuity continued. 25 of the titles published before Convergence continued to be published with many of the same creative teams, along with 24 new titles.

=== "Justice League" ===
These titles feature characters related to the Justice League.

Title	Publication dates / Issues	Initial creative team^{[note1]}	Notes / References
Aquaman	First Wave; September 2011 – March 2015^{[note4]} (1–40, 0, plus 2 Annuals)	Writer; Geoff Johns; Penciller; Ivan Reis; Inker; Joe Prado	
Aquaman and the Others	Seventh Wave; April 2014 – March 2015 (1–11)	Writer; Dan Jurgens; Artists; Lan Medina; Ed Tadeo	Featuring Aquaman, the Operative, Prisoner-Of-War, Ya’wara, and Sky.
Captain Atom	First Wave; September 2011 – September 2012 (1–12, 0)	Writer; J. T. Krul; Artist; Freddie Williams II	
DC Universe Presents	First Wave; September 2011 – April 2013 (1–19, 0)	Various	This series, (not to be confused with the Titan Magazines series), presents multi-issue stories about different DC characters, each by a different creative team. Issues 1–5: Deadman; Issues 6–8: Challengers of the Unknown; Issues 9–11: Vandal Savage; Issue 12: Kid Flash; Issue 0: O.M.A.C.; Mister Terrific; Hawk & Dove; Blackhawks; Deadman; Issues 13–16: Black Lightning and Blue Devil; Issue 17: Arsenal; Issue 18: Starfire; Issue 19: Beowulf
Earth 2	Second Wave; May 2012 – March 2015 (1–32, 0, plus 2 Annuals)	Writer; James Robinson; Penciller; Nicola Scott; Inker; Trevor Scott	This series is set on a parallel earth and headlined by the Wonders of the World.
The Flash	First Wave; September 2011 – March 2015^{[note4]} (1–40, 0, plus 3 Annuals)	Writers; Brian Buccellato; Francis Manapul; Artist; Francis Manapul	Focusing on Barry Allen.
The Fury of Firestorm: The Nuclear Men	First Wave; September 2011 – May 2013 (1–20, 0)	Writers; Gail Simone; Ethan Van Sciver; Artist; Yıldıray Çınar	Focusing on Jason Rusch and Ronnie Raymond. The title appearing on the series' cover was changed from The Nuclear Men to The Nuclear Man with issue 13
Green Arrow	First Wave; September 2011 – March 2015^{[note4]} (1–40, 0)	Writer; J.T. Krul; Artists; David Baron; Dan Jurgens; George Pérez; Dave Wilkins	
Justice League	First Wave; August 2011 – April 2015^{[note4]} (1–40, 0)	Writer; Geoff Johns; Penciller; Jim Lee; Inker; Scott Williams	The first six issues cover the Justice League's origin that took place five years before the present day, with initial team members Superman, Batman, Green Lantern, Flash, Wonder Woman, Aquaman, and Cyborg. A ten-page Shazam! back-up feature by Johns and artist Gary Frank began with issue 7 and concluded with issue 21, serving as a Shazam!-only story.
Justice League 3000	Sixth Wave; December 2013 – March 2015 (1–15)	Writer; Keith Giffen; JM DeMatteis; Artist; Howard Porter	
Justice League International	First Wave; September 2011 – August 2012 (1–12, plus 1 Annual)	Writer; Dan Jurgens; Penciller; Aaron Lopresti; Inker; Matt Ryan	Initial team included Booster Gold, Fire, Ice, Rocket Red (Gavril Ivanovich), Green Lantern, Vixen, August General in Iron, and Godiva.
Justice League of America's Vibe	Fourth Wave; February 2013 – December 2013 (1–10)	Writers; Andrew Kreisberg; Geoff Johns; Artist; Pete Woods	
Justice League of America	Fourth Wave; February 2013 – May 2014 (1–14)	Writer; Geoff Johns; Artist; David Finch	Initial team members are Steve Trevor, Martian Manhunter, Green Arrow, Hawkman, Catwoman, Green Lantern Simon Baz, Stargirl, Katana, and Vibe. Includes a Martian Manhunter back-up feature written by Matt Kindt with art by Scott Clark, starting with issue 2. The series was intended to be retitled Justice League Canada in 2014, before announcing in January 2014 that it would relaunch as Justice League United in April 2014.
Justice League United	Seventh Wave; April 2014 – March 2015^{[note4]} (0–10, plus 1 Annual)	Writer; Jeff Lemire; Artist; Mike McKone	Initial team members are Animal Man, Martian Manhunter, Green Arrow, Hawkman, Stargirl, Supergirl, Adam Strange, Alanna, and a new character, Equinox, a Cree teenager from Moose Factory. Her powers stem from the Earth and change with the seasons. The series was intended to be a retitled version of Justice League of America, known as Justice League Canada, until it was announced in January 2014 that Justice League of America would be relaunched. An extra-size zero issue released in April 2014, followed by the first issue of the series in May 2014. Issues 1–3 were offered with Canadian variant covers, featuring the working title of "Justice League Canada" instead of Justice League United.
Katana	Fourth Wave; February 2013 – December 2013 (1–10)	Writer; Ann Nocenti; Artist; Alex Sanchez	Spinning out of Justice League of America and Birds of Prey.
Mister Terrific	First Wave; September 2011 – April 2012 (1–8)	Writer; Eric Wallace; Penciller; Gianluca Gugliotta; Inker; Wayne Faucher	
The Savage Hawkman	First Wave; September 2011 – May 2013 (1–20, 0)	Writer; Tony Daniel; Artist; Philip Tan	Focusing on Katar Hol under the name of Carter Hall.
Secret Origins	Seventh Wave; April 2014 – March 2015 (1–11)	Various	Focusing on The New 52 beginnings of DC heroes by a rotating creative team depending on the characters covered. Issue 1: Superman; Supergirl; Dick Grayson; Issue 2: Batman; Aquaman; Starfire; Issue 3: Green Lantern (Hal Jordan); Batwoman; Red Robin; Issue 4: Harley Quinn; Green Arrow; Damian Wayne; Issue 5: Cyborg; Red Hood; Mera; Issue 6: Wonder Woman; Deadman; Sinestro; Issue 7: Huntress; Superboy; The Flash; Issue 8: Grayson; Animal Man; Katana; Issue 9: Swamp Thing; Power Girl; Green Lantern (John Stewart); Issue 10: Batgirl; Firestorm; Poison Ivy; Issue 11: Black Canary; Red Lantern Guy Gardner; John Constantine
Wonder Woman	First Wave; September 2011 – April 2015^{[note4]} (1–40, 0)	Writer; Brian Azzarello; Artist; Cliff Chiang	
Worlds' Finest	Second Wave; May 2012 – March 2015 (1–32, 0, plus 1 Annual)	Writer; Paul Levitz; Artists; George Pérez; Kevin Maguire	For most of the series, this title starred the Earth 2 versions of Robin and Supergirl (changing their names to Huntress and Power Girl after they were relocated to Earth Prime.)

=== "Batman" ===
These titles feature Batman and the "Batman Family" of characters.

Title	Publication dates / Issues	Initial creative team^{[note1]}	Notes / References
Arkham Manor	Ninth Wave; October 2014 – March 2015 (1–6)	Writer; Gerry Duggan; Artist; Shawn Crystal	Wayne Manor gets transformed into a new Arkham Asylum. In April 2015, Arkham Manor: Endgame #1 was also published, as a tie-in to the "Batman: Endgame" storyline.
Batgirl	First Wave; September 2011 – March 2015^{[note4]} (1–40, 0, plus 2 Annuals)	Writer; Gail Simone; Penciller; Ardian Syaf; Inker; Vicente Cifuentes	Focusing on Barbara Gordon, who has retaken the mantle of Batgirl. In March 2015, Batgirl: Endgame #1 was also published, as a tie-in to the "Batman: Endgame" storyline.
Batman	First Wave; September 2011 – April 2015^{[note4]} (1–40, 0, plus 3 Annuals)	Writer; Scott Snyder; Penciller; Greg Capullo; Inker; Jonathan Glapion	Starting with issue 8, a back-up feature was included, written by Scott Snyder and James Tynion IV.
Batman: The Dark Knight	First Wave; September 2011 – March 2014 (1–29, 0, plus 1 Annual)	Writers; David Finch; Paul Jenkins; Penciller; David Finch; Inker; Richard Friend	
Batman and Robin^{[note2]}	First Wave; September 2011 – March 2015 (1–40, 0, plus 3 Annuals)	Writer; Peter J. Tomasi; Penciller; Pat Gleason; Inker; Mick Gray	
Batman, Incorporated	Second Wave; May 2012 – July 2013 (1–13, 0, plus 1 special)	Writer; Grant Morrison; Artist; Chris Burnham	The series concluded in July 2013, with a final special issue released in August 2013.
Batwing	First Wave; September 2011 – August 2014 (1–34, 0)	Writer; Judd Winick; Artist; Ben Oliver	Initially focused on David Zavimbe, and later Luke Fox starting with issue 20. The series concluded in August 2014, with a "The New 52: Futures End" one-shot releasing in September 2014.
Batwoman	First Wave; September 2011 – March 2015 (1–40, 0, plus 1 Annual)	Writers; J. H. Williams III; W. Haden Blackman; Artist; J. H. Williams III	
Birds of Prey	First Wave; September 2011 – August 2014 (1–34, 0)	Writer; Duane Swierczynski; Artist; Jesús Saíz	Initial team included Black Canary, Batgirl, Starling, Katana and Poison Ivy. The series concluded in August 2014, with a "The New 52: Futures End" one-shot releasing in September 2014.
Catwoman	First Wave; September 2011 – March 2015^{[note4]} (1–40, 0, plus 1 Annual)	Writer; Judd Winick; Artist; Guillem March	
Detective Comics	First Wave; September 2011 – March 2015^{[note4]} (1–40, 0, plus 3 Annuals)	Writer; Tony S. Daniel; Penciller; Tony S. Daniel; Inker; Ryan Winn	In March 2015, Detective Comics: Endgame #1 was also published, as a tie-in to the "Batman: Endgame" storyline.
Gotham Academy	Ninth Wave; October 2014 – April 2015^{[note4]} (1–6)	Writers; Becky Cloonan; Brandon Fletcher; Artist; Karl Kerschl	A teen drama set in a preparatory school in Gotham, where Bruce Wayne is a benefactor. In April 2015, Gotham Academy: Endgame #1 was also published, as a tie-in to the "Batman: Endgame" storyline.
Gotham by Midnight	Ninth Wave; November 2014 – March 2015^{[note4]} (1–5)	Writers; Ray Fawkes; Artist; Ben Templesmith	A horror series featuring Detective Jim Corrigan (Spectre) as part of "The Midnight Shift", a division of the Gotham City Police Department which focuses on supernatural occurrences.
Grayson	Eighth Wave; July 2014 – March 2015^{[note4]} (1–8, plus 1 Annual)	Writers; Tim Seeley; Tom King; Artist; Mikel Janin	Examining Dick Grayson's new life as an undercover superspy for Spyral, as he attempts to stay "dead" after the events of Forever Evil. Former CIA agent Tom King is a contributing writer for the series.
Harley Quinn	Sixth Wave; November 2013 – April 2015^{[note4]} (0–16, plus 1 Annual)	Writer; Amanda Conner; Jimmy Palmiotti; Artist; Chad Hardin	The first issue, released as #0, features nineteen different artists, with Harley breaking the fourth wall, critiquing each of them. One of the artists, Chad Hardin, was announced as the series ongoing artist in September 2013.
Nightwing	First Wave; September 2011 – May 2014 (1–30, 0, plus 1 Annual)	Writer; Kyle Higgins; Penciller; Eddy Barrows; Inker; JP Mayer	Focusing on Dick Grayson.
Red Hood and the Outlaws	First Wave; September 2011 – March 2015 (1–40, 0, plus 2 Annuals)	Writer; Scott Lobdell; Artist; Kenneth Rocafort	Focusing on Jason Todd, Roy Harper and Starfire.
Talon	Third Wave; September 2012 – March 2014 (0–17)	Writers; Scott Snyder; James Tynion IV; Artist; Guillem March	Spinning off from the "Night of the Owls" storyline in Batman, it focuses on the former Talon Calvin Rose.

=== "Superman" ===
These titles feature Superman and the "Superman Family" of characters.

Title	Publication dates / Issues	Initial creative team^{[note1]}	Notes / References
Action Comics	First Wave; September 2011 – March 2015^{[note4]} (1–40, 0, plus 3 Annuals)	Writer; Grant Morrison; Penciller; Rags Morales; Inker; Rick Bryant	Action Comics' first story arc details Superman's rebooted history, while Superman features his present day adventures. Superman's new costume is explained as a ceremonial battle armor that pays tribute to his Kryptonian past. While originally focusing in the past around the beginning of Superman's career, the series shifted to the present starting with Issue 19.
Batman/Superman	Fifth Wave; June 2013 – March 2015^{[note4]} (1–20, plus 2 Annuals)	Writer; Greg Pak; Artist; Jae Lee; Ben Oliver	The series focuses on the shared adventures of Batman and Superman in The New 52.
Superboy	First Wave; September 2011 – August 2014 (1–34, 0, plus 1 Annual)	Writer; Scott Lobdell; Penciller; R. B. Silva; Inker; Robeiro Leandro da Silva	Superboy's history was intended to have much of it intact with the character kidnapped by N.O.W.H.E.R.E. for reverse engineering. However, writer Scott Lobdell points out that much of the character's backstory that was tied to Superman's backstory was erased when the changes to Superman were made. The series concluded in August 2014, with a "The New 52: Futures End" one-shot releasing in September 2014.
Supergirl	First Wave; September 2011 – March 2015 (1–40, 0)	Writers; Michael Green; Mike Johnson; Penciller; Mahmud Asrar; Inkers; Dan Green; Mahmud Asrar	
Superman	First Wave; September 2011 – April 2015^{[note4]} (1–40, 0, plus 2 Annuals)	Writer; George Pérez; Pencillers; Jesús Merino; George Pérez; Inker; Jesús Merino	
Superman/Wonder Woman	Sixth Wave; October 2013 – April 2015^{[note4]} (1–17, plus 1 Annual)	Writer; Charles Soule; Artist; Tony Daniel; Batt	The series explores the relationship between Superman and Wonder Woman.
Superman Unchained	Fifth Wave; June 2013 – October 2014 (1–9)	Writer; Scott Snyder; Artist; Jim Lee; Scott Williams; Dustin Nguyen	Includes a back-up feature written by Scott Snyder and drawn by Dustin Nguyen.

=== "Green Lantern" ===
These titles feature the members of the Green Lantern Corps, as well as the other Lantern Corps of the emotional spectrum.

Title	Publication dates / Issues	Initial creative team^{[note1]}	Notes / References
Green Lantern	First Wave; September 2011 – March 2015^{[note4]} (1–40, 0, plus 3 Annuals)	Writer; Geoff Johns; Penciller; Doug Mahnke; Inkers; Christian Alamy; Tom Nguyen	Focusing on the Green Lanterns Hal Jordan, Sinestro, and Simon Baz. In February 2014, issue 28 released as a joint flip issue with Red Lanterns.
Green Lantern Corps	First Wave; September 2011 – March 2015 (1–40, 0, plus 2 Annuals)	Writer; Peter Tomasi; Penciller; Fernando Pasarin; Inker; Scott Hanna	Originally focusing on the Green Lanterns Guy Gardner and John Stewart before shifting to focusing solely on Stewart with issue 21.
Green Lantern: New Guardians	First Wave; September 2011 – March 2015 (1–40, 0, plus 2 Annuals)	Writer; Tony Bedard; Penciller; Tyler Kirkham; Inker; Batt	Initially focusing on a makeshift team of "guardians", featuring Kyle Rayner (Green Lantern Corps), Arkillo (Sinestro Corps), Bleez (Red Lantern Corps), Glomulus (Orange Lantern Corps), Munk (Indigo Tribe), Saint Walker (Blue Lantern Corps) and Fatality (Star Sapphires).
Larfleeze	Fifth Wave; June 2013 – June 2014 (1–12)	Writers; Keith Giffen; J.M. DeMatteis; Artist; Scott Kollins	Spinning out of the Threshold back-up featuring Larfleeze.
Red Lanterns	First Wave; September 2011 – March 2015 (1–40, 0, plus 1 Annual)	Writer; Peter Milligan; Penciller; Ed Benes; Inker; Rob Hunter	Focused on Atrocitus and his Red Lanterns. Starting with issue 21, the series focused on former Green Lantern Guy Gardner, now a Red Lantern. In February 2014, issue 28 released as a joint flip issue with Green Lantern.
Sinestro	Seventh Wave; April 2014 – March 2015^{[note4]} (1–11, plus 1 Annual)	Writer; Cullen Bunn; Artist; Dale Eaglesham	Spinning out of the "Forever Evil" event and the Sinestro "Villains Month" one-shot in Green Lantern #23.4. Also featuring members of the Sinestro Corps, with Arkillo, Lyssa Drak, Dez Trevius, and Rigen Kale acting as an "inner council" for Sinestro.

=== "Young Justice" ===
These titles feature teen-aged characters and superhero teams.

Title	Publication dates / Issues	Initial creative team^{[note1]}	Notes / References
Blue Beetle	First Wave; September 2011 – January 2013 (1–16, 0)	Writer; Tony Bedard; Penciller; Ig Guara; Inker; Ruy Jose	
Hawk & Dove	First Wave; September 2011 – April 2012 (1–8)	Writer; Sterling Gates; Artist; Rob Liefeld	
Legion Lost	First Wave; September 2011 – January 2013 (1–16, 0)	Writer; Fabian Nicieza; Artist; Pete Woods	Initial team included Chameleon Girl, Dawnstar, Gates, Timber Wolf, Tellus, Tyroc, and Wildfire.
Legion of Super-Heroes	First Wave; September 2011 – August 2013 (1–23, 0)	Writer; Paul Levitz; Artist; Francis Portela	The Legion did not undergo a reboot; instead, the Post-Infinite Crisis Legion remained more or less intact, having lost contact with their Superman after the events of "Flashpoint".
Static Shock	First Wave; September 2011 – April 2012 (1–8)	Writers; Scott McDaniel; John Rozum; Penciller; Scott McDaniel; Inkers; Jonathan Glapion; LaMonte L. Underwood	
Teen Titans (vol. 4)	First Wave; September 2011 – April 2014 (1–30, 0, plus 3 Annuals)	Writer; Scott Lobdell; Penciller; Brett Booth; Inker; Norm Rapmund	Initial team consisted of Red Robin, Kid Flash, Superboy, Wonder Girl, Solstice, Skitter and Bunker.
Teen Titans (vol. 5)	Eighth Wave; July 2014 – March 2015^{[note4]} (1–8, plus 1 Annual)	Writer; Will Pfeifer; Artist; Kenneth Rocafort	This series is a relaunch of Teen Titans (vol. 4), and continues that continuity, while still heading in a new direction and exploring new themes. Initial team consists of Red Robin, Wonder Girl, Raven, Bunker, and Beast Boy.
The Ravagers	Second Wave; May 2012 – May 2013 (1–12, 0)	Writer; Howard Mackie; Artists; Ian Churchill; Norm Rapmund	Spinning out of "The Culling" storyline from Teen Titans and Superboy.

=== "The Edge" ===
These are titles with war, science fiction, western, or crime themes, and include titles and characters formerly belonging to the WildStorm imprint.

Title	Publication dates / Issues	Initial creative team^{[note1]}	Notes / References
All-Star Western	First Wave; September 2011 – August 2014 (1–34, 0)	Writers; Jimmy Palmiotti; Justin Gray; Artist; Moritat	Focusing on Jonah Hex and Amadeus Arkham.
Blackhawks	First Wave; September 2011 – April 2012 (1–8)	Writer; Mike Costa; Artist; Ken Lashley	
Deathstroke (vol. 2)	First Wave; September 2011 – May 2013 (1–20, 0)	Writer; Kyle Higgins; Penciller; Joe Bennett; Inker; Art Thibert	
Deathstroke (vol. 3)	Ninth Wave; October 2014 – March 2015^{[note4]} (1–6)	Writer; Tony Daniel; Artists; Tony Daniel; Sandu Florea	
G.I. Combat	Second Wave; May 2012 – December 2012 (1–7, 0)	Writers; J. T. Krul; Justin Gray; Jimmy Palmiotti; Artists; Ariel Olivetti; Dan Panosian	
Grifter	First Wave; September 2011 – January 2013 (1–16, 0)	Writer; Nathan Edmondson; Penciller; CAFU; Inker; Jason Gorder	
Infinity Man and the Forever People	Eighth Wave; June 2014 – March 2015 (1–9)	Writers; Keith Giffen; Dan DiDio; Artists; Keith Giffen; Scott Koblish	
Lobo	Ninth Wave; October 2014 – March 2015^{[note4]} (1–6)	Writer; Cullen Bunn; Artist; Reilly Brown	
Men of War	First Wave; September 2011 – April 2012 (1–8)	Writers; Jonathan Vankin; Ivan Brandon; Artists; Tom Derenick; Phil Winslade	
New Suicide Squad	Eighth Wave; July 2014 – March 2015^{[note4]} (1–8)	Writer; Sean Ryan; Artist; Jeremy Roberts	Initial team members are Harley Quinn, Deadshot, Deathstroke, Black Manta and Joker's Daughter.
O.M.A.C.	First Wave; September 2011 – April 2012 (1–8)	Writers; Keith Giffen; Dan DiDio; Penciller; Keith Giffen; Inker; Scott Koblish	Focusing on Kevin Kho.
Secret Six	Ninth Wave; December 2014 – February 2015^{[note4]} (1–2)	Writer; Gail Simone; Artist; Ken Lashley	Focusing on Catman, Scandal Savage, Deadshot, Rag Doll, and Black Alice.
Star-Spangled War Stories Featuring G.I. Zombie	Eighth Wave; July 2014 – March 2015 (1–8)	Writers; Jimmy Palmiotti; Justin Gray; Artist; Scott Hampton	Focusing on G.I. Zombie, as he fights for his country war after war.
Stormwatch	First Wave; September 2011 – April 2014 (1–30, 0)	Writer; Paul Cornell; Artist; Miguel A. Sepulveda	Initial team included Jack Hawksmoor, Apollo, Midnighter, Jenny Quantum, the Engineer, Adam One, the Martian Manhunter, Emma Rice and Harry Tanner. Stormwatch is an organization that has protected Earth from major alien threats since the Dark Ages.
Suicide Squad	First Wave; September 2011 – May 2014 (1–30, 0)	Writer; Adam Glass; Pencillers; Federico Dallocchio; Ransom Getty; Inkers; Scott Hanna; Federico Dallocchio	Initial team members are Harley Quinn, Deadshot, El Diablo, Voltaic, Black Spider, Savant, King Shark and Yo-Yo
Team 7	Third Wave; September 2012 – May 2013 (0–8)	Writer; Justin Jordan; Artist; Jesús Merino	This title revived a former WildStorm title.
The Green Team: Teen Trillionaires	Fifth Wave; May 2013 – January 2014 (1–8)	Writers; Art Baltazar; Franco Aureliani; Artist; Ig Guara	Focusing on the "1%" of The New 52, and the effect money has on the superhero world.
The Movement	Fifth Wave; May 2013 – May 2014 (1–12)	Writer; Gail Simone; Artist; Freddie Williams II	The Movement examines and represents the "poor" and those who suffer from the abuse of money.
Threshold	Fourth Wave; January 2013 – August 2013 (1–8)	Writer; Keith Giffen; Artists; Tom Raney; Scott Kolins	Spinning out of Green Lantern: New Guardians Annual #1 and Blue Beetle #16, Threshold explores the cosmic mythos of The New 52. A ten-page Larfleeze back-up feature by Keith Giffen ran from issues 1 to 5. A Star Hawkins back-up feature started with issue 6.
Voodoo	First Wave; September 2011 – September 2012 (1–12, 0)	Writer; Ron Marz; Artist; Sami Basri	

=== "The Dark" ===
These are titles with supernatural, fantasy and horror themes, including titles and characters formerly belonging to the Vertigo imprint.

Title	Publication dates / Issues	Initial creative team^{[note1]}	Notes / References
Animal Man	First Wave; September 2011 – March 2014 (1–29, 0, plus 2 Annuals)	Writer; Jeff Lemire; Penciller; Travel Foreman; Inkers; Dan Green; Travel Foreman	
Demon Knights	First Wave; September 2011 – August 2013 (1–23, 0)	Writer; Paul Cornell; Penciller; Diogenes Neves; Inker; Oclair Albert	
Dial H	Second Wave; May 2012 – August 2013 (1–15, 0)	Writer; China Miéville; Artist; Mateus Santoluoco	An epilogue to the series was published in September 2013, part of "Villains Month", in Justice League issue 23.3, titled Dial E #1.
Constantine	Fourth Wave; March 2013 – March 2015 (1–23)	Writers; Jeff Lemire; Ray Fawkes; Artist; Renato Guedes	Constantine launched after the Hellblazer Vertigo title ended in February 2013 with issue 300, focusing on the detective's adventures in The New 52.
Frankenstein, Agent of S.H.A.D.E.	First Wave; September 2011 – January 2013 (1–16, 0)	Writer; Jeff Lemire; Artist; Alberto Ponticelli	Focusing on Frankenstein, Father Time and the members of the secret organization called S.H.A.D.E. Frankenstein is an undead creature stitched together from several corpses.
I, Vampire	First Wave; September 2011 – April 2013 (1–19, 0)	Writer; Joshua Hale Fialkov; Artist; Andrea Sorrentino	
Justice League Dark	First Wave; September 2011 – March 2015 (1–40, 0, plus 2 Annuals)	Writer; Peter Milligan; Artist; Mikel Janin	
Klarion	Ninth Wave; October 2014 – March 2015 (1–6)	Writer; Ann Nocenti; Artist; Trevor McCarthy	
Resurrection Man	First Wave; September 2011 – September 2012 (1–12, 0)	Writers; Dan Abnett; Andy Lanning; Artist; Fernando Dagnino	
Swamp Thing	First Wave; September 2011 – March 2015 (1–40, 0, plus 3 Annuals)	Writer; Scott Snyder; Artist; Yanick Paquette	Focusing on Alec Holland.
Sword of Sorcery	Third Wave; September 2012 – May 2013 (0–8)	Writers; Christy Marx; Tony Bedard; Artists; Aaron Lopresti; Jesús Saíz	Reviving the character Amethyst as well as a Beowulf back-up feature (by Tony Bedard and Jesus Saiz) that ran from issues 0 to 3 and a Stalker back-up feature (by Marc Andreyko and Andrei Bressan) which ran from issues 4 to 6.
Trinity of Sin	Ninth Wave; October 2014 – March 2015 (1–6)	Writer; J.M. DeMatteis; Artist; Yvel Guichet	Focusing on Phantom Stranger, Pandora and The Question. The series continues the storylines of Phantom Stranger and Pandora from their series, Trinity of Sin: The Phantom Stranger and Trinity of Sin: Pandora, respectively.
Trinity of Sin: Pandora	Fifth Wave; July 2013 – August 2014 (1–14)	Writer; Ray Fawkes; Artist; Daniel Sampere; Vicente Cifuentes; Patrick Zircher	The series concluded in August 2014, with a "The New 52: Futures End" one-shot releasing in September 2014.
Trinity of Sin: The Phantom Stranger	Third Wave; September 2012 – August 2014 (0–22)	Writer; Dan DiDio; Artists; Brent Anderson; Scott Hanna	Originally known as The Phantom Stranger before being retitled in June 2013. The series concluded in August 2014, with a "The New 52: Futures End" one-shot releasing in September 2014.

== Other titles ==
Since the launch of The New 52, DC has published a variety of limited series and one-shots taking place in The New 52 universe and published under The New 52 banner.

=== One-shots ===
Title	Creative team	Notes / References
Batman, Incorporated Special #1; August 2013	Writers; Chris Burnham; Joe Keatinge; Dan Didio others Artists; Chris Burnham; Ethan Van Sciver; Jason Masters others	
Batman: Joker's Daughter #1; February 2014	Writer; Marguerite Bennett; Artist; Meghan Hetrick	
Batman Zero Year: Director's Cut #1; July 2013	Writers; Scott Snyder; James Tynion IV; Pencillers; Greg Capullo; Rafael Albuquerque	
Forever Evil Aftermath: Batman vs. Bane #1; April 2014	Writer; Peter J. Tomasi; Penciller; Scot Eaton; Inker; Jaime Mendoza	
Forever Evil Director's Cut #1; October 2013	Writer; Geoff Johns; Penciller; David Finch	
Harley Quinn Director's Cut #0; June 2014	Writer; Amanda Conner; Jimmy Palmiotti others Artists; Amanda Conner; Jim Lee; Tony S. Daniel; Walter Simonson; Charlie Adlard; Bruce Timm; Adam Hughes; Art Baltazar; Darwyn Cooke; Chad Hardin; Jeremy Roberts others	
Harley Quinn Holiday Special #1; December 2014	Writer; Jimmy Palmiotti; Amanda Conner; Artists; Darwyn Cooke; John Timms others	
Harley Quinn Invades Comic-Con International: San Diego #1; July 2014	Writer; Jimmy Palmiotti; Amanda Conner; Artists; Multiple	
Harley Quinn Valentine's Day Special #1; February 2015	Writer; Jimmy Palmiotti; Amanda Conner; Artist; John Timms	
Justice League: Trinity War – Director's Cut #1; August 2013	Writer; Geoff Johns; Penciller; Ivan Reis	
New Gods: Godhead #1; October 2014	Writers; Robert Venditti; Charles Soule; Cullen Bunn; Van Jensen; Justin Jordan; Artists; Pete Woods; Rags Morales; Billy Tan	The first chapter in the "Green Lantern" title's crossover storyline, "Godhead".
Robin Rises: Omega #1; July 2014	Writer; Peter J. Tomasi; Artists; Andy Kubert; Jonathan Glapion	Concluding the "Hunt for Robin" story line in Batman and... #29–32 and leading directly into Batman and Robin #33.
Robin Rises: Alpha #1; December 2014	Writer; Peter J. Tomasi; Artists; Andy Kubert; Jonathan Glapion	
Superman by Geoff Johns and John Romita, Jr.: Director's Cut #1; September 2014	Writer; Geoff Johns; Penciller; John Romita, Jr.	
Superman: Doomed #1; May 2014	Writers; Scott Lobdell; Greg Pak; Charles Soule; Artist; Ken Lashley	
Superman: Doomed #2; September 2014	Writers; Greg Pak; Charles Soule; Artists; Ken Lashley; Jack Herbert	
Superman: Lois Lane #1; February 2014	Writer; Marguerite Bennett; Artist; Emanuela Lupacchino	
Superman Unchained: Director's Cut #1; July 2013	Writer; Scott Snyder; Pencillers; Jim Lee; Dustin Nguyen	
Suicide Squad: Amanda Waller #1; March 2014	Writer; Jim Zub; Artist; Andre Coelho	
The Multiversity: Pax Americana: Director's Cut #1; May 2015	Writer; Grant Morrison; Artist; Frank Quietly	
The New 52! Free Comic Book Day Special Edition #1; May 2012	Writer; Geoff Johns; Artists; Jim Lee; Ivan Reis; Joe Prado; Kenneth Rocafort; Gene Ha	A Free Comic Book Day one-shot, acting as a preview for the "Trinity War" event.
Young Romance: A New 52 Valentine's Day Special #1; February 2013	Writers; Andy Diggle; Ann Nocenti; Cecil Castellucci; Peter Milligan; Artists; Gene Ha; Emanuella Luppichinno; Phil Jimenez; Sanford Green	A Valentine's Day special featuring various characters and story in anthology style.

=== Miniseries ===
Title	Creative team	Notes / References
Damian: Son of Batman #1–4; October 2013 – January 2014	Andy Kubert	
Convergence #0–8; April 2015 – May 2015	Writer; Jeff King; Artists; Carlo Pagulayan; Jason Paz; Stephen Segovia	Spins out of the final issues of The New 52: Futures End and Earth 2: World's End. The story will be told over a 9 week miniseries, beginning with a zero issue, with 40 two-part miniseries tie-ins from various writers and artists that examine the worlds of the DC Universe over the decades, as well as the heroes and villains contained within. Writer Jeff King handles the scripting and storytelling for the main miniseries, with Scott Lobdell helping with the overall plot. Some of the tie-ins see the brief return of pre-New 52 Universe characters.
Forever Evil #1–7; September 2013 – May 2014	Writer; Geoff Johns; Artist; David Finch	
Forever Evil: A.R.G.U.S. #1–6; October 2013 – March 2014	Writer; Sterling Gates; Pencillers; Philip Tan; Neil Edwards; Javier Pena; Inkers; Jason Paz; Jay Leisten; Javier Pena	
Forever Evil: Arkham War #1–6; October 2013 – March 2014	Writer; Peter J. Tomasi; Penciller; Scot Eaton; Inker; Jaime Mendoza	
Forever Evil: Rogues Rebellion #1–6; October 2013 – March 2014	Writer; Brian Buccellato; Artists; Patrick Zircher; Scott Hepburn	
Human Bomb #1–4; December 2012 – March 2013	Writers; Justin Gray; Jimmy Palmiotti; Artist; Jerry Ordway	
Huntress #1–6; October 2011 – March 2012	Writer; Paul Levitz; Artists; Marcus To; John Dell	
Legion: Secret Origin #1–6; October 2011 – March 2012	Writer; Paul Levitz; Artists; Chris Batista; Marc Deering	
My Greatest Adventure #1–6; October 2011 – March 2012	Writers; Aaron Lopresti; Kevin Maguire; Matt Kindt; Artists; Aaron Lopresti; Kevin Maguire; Matt Ryan; Scott Kolins	
National Comics; July 2012 – October 2012	Various	A revival of the anthology title from the 1940s. It is intended to expand The New 52 universe by presenting single-issue stories about various DC characters, each by a different creative team. The titles include: Eternity #1 by Jeff Lemire and drawn by Cully Hamner; Looker #1 by Ian Edginton and drawn by Mike S. Miller and Guillem March; Rose & Thorn #1 by Tom Taylor and drawn by Neil Googe and Ryan Sook; Madame X #1 by Rob Williams and drawn by Trevor Hairsine and Fiona Staples
Night Force #1–7; March 2012 – September 2012	Writer; Marv Wolfman; Artist; Tom Mandrake	
Penguin: Pain and Prejudice #1–5; October 2011 – February 2012	Writer; Gregg Hurwitz; Artist; Szymon Kudranski	
Phantom Lady and Doll Man #1–4; August 2012 – November 2012	Writers; Justin Gray; Jimmy Palmiotti; Artists; Cat Staggs; Rich Perotta	
The Ray #1–4; December 2011 – March 2012	Writers; Jimmy Palmiotti; Justin Gray; Artist; Jamal Igle	
The Multiversity; August 2014 – April 2015	Writer; Grant Morrison; Artists; Ivan Reis; Joe Prado; Chris Sprouse; Karl Story; Ben Oliver; Frank Quitely; Cameron Stewart others	The Multiversity features seven complete adventures, each set in a different parallel universe, a two part framing story, and comprehensive guidebook to the 52 alternate Earths of the DC Multiverse.
The Shade #1–12; October 2011 – September 2012	Writer; James Robinson; Artist; Cully Hamner	

==== Convergence titles ====
Released in April and May 2015. Titles were released as Convergence: [Title]. For example, The Atom's issues was released as Convergence: The Atom.
Title	Creative team	Notes / References
Action Comics #1–2	Writer; Justin Gray; Artist; Claude St-Aubin	Set in a Crisis on Infinite Earths DC universe.
The Adventures of Superman #1–2	Writer; Marv Wolfman; Artists; Roberto Viacava; Andy Owens	Set in a Crisis on Infinite Earths DC universe.
Aquaman #1–2	Writer; Tony Bedard; Artist; Cliff Richards	Set in a "Zero Hour" DC universe.
Batgirl #1–2	Writer; Alisa Kwitney; Artists; Rick Leonardi; Mark Pennington	Set in a pre-"Flashpoint" DC universe.
Batman: Shadow of the Bat #1–2	Writer; Larry Hama; Artists; Philip Tan; Jason Paz	Set in a "Zero Hour" DC universe.
Batman and Robin #1–2	Writer; Ron Marz; Artists; Denys Cowan; Klaus Janson	Set in a pre-"Flashpoint" DC universe.
Batman and the Outsiders #1–2	Writer; Marc Andreyko; Artist; Carlos D’anda	Set in a Crisis on Infinite Earths DC universe.
Blue Beetle #1–2	Writer; Scott Lobdell; Artist; Yishan Li	Set in a Crisis on Infinite Earths DC universe.
Booster Gold #1–2	Writer; Dan Jurgens; Artists; Alvaro Martinez; Raul Fernandez	Set in a Crisis on Infinite Earths DC universe.
Catwoman #1–2	Writer; Justin Gray; Artist; Ron Randall	Set in a "Zero Hour" DC universe.
Crime Syndicate #1–2	Writer; Brian Buccellato; Artist; Phil Winslade	Set in a Crisis on Infinite Earths DC universe.
Detective Comics #1–2	Writer; Len Wein; Artists; Denys Cowan; Bill Sienkiewicz	Set in a Crisis on Infinite Earths DC universe.
Green Arrow #1–2	Writer; Christy Marx; Artists; Rags Morales; Claude St-Aubin	Set in a "Zero Hour" DC universe.
Green Lantern/Parallax #1–2	Writer; Tony Bedard; Artists; Ron Wagner; Bill Reinhold	Set in a "Zero Hour" DC universe.
Green Lantern Corps #1–2	Writer; David Gallaher; Artists; Steve Ellis; Ande Parks	Set in a Crisis on Infinite Earths DC universe.
Harley Quinn #1–2	Writer; Steve Pugh; Artists; Phil Winslade; John Dell	Set in a pre-"Flashpoint" DC universe.
Hawkman #1–2	Writer; Jeff Parker; Artists; Tim Truman; Enrique Alcatena	Set in a Crisis on Infinite Earths DC universe.
Infinity, Inc. #1–2	Writer; Jerry Ordway; Artist; Ben Caldwell	Set in a Crisis on Infinite Earths DC universe.
Justice League #1–2	Writer; Frank Tieri; Artist; Vicente Cifuentes	Set in a pre-"Flashpoint" DC universe.
Justice League International #1–2	Writer; Ron Marz; Artist; Mike Manley	Set in a "Zero Hour" DC universe.
Justice League America #1–2	Writer; Fabian Nicieza; Artist; Chriscross	Set in a Crisis on Infinite Earths DC universe.
Justice Society of America #1–2	Writer; Dan Abnett; Artists; Tom Derenick; Trevor Scott	Set in a Crisis on Infinite Earths DC universe.
New Teen Titans #1–2	Writer; Marv Wolfman; Artists; Nicola Scott; Marc Deering	Set in a Crisis on Infinite Earths DC universe.
Nightwing/Oracle #1–2	Writer; Gail Simone; Artists; Jan Duursema; Dan Parsons	Set in a pre-"Flashpoint" DC universe.
Plastic Man and the Freedom Fighters #1–2	Writer; Simon Oliver; Artist; John McCrea	Set in a Crisis on Infinite Earths DC universe.
The Question #1–2	Writer; Greg Rucka; Artist; Cully Hamner	Set in a pre-"Flashpoint" DC universe.
Shazam! #1–2	Writer; Jeff Parker; Artist; Evan "Doc" Shaner	Set in a Crisis on Infinite Earths DC universe.
Speed Force #1–2	Writer; Tony Bedard; Artists; Tom Grummett; Sean Parsons	Set in a pre-"Flashpoint" DC universe.
Suicide Squad #1–2	Writer; Frank Tieri; Artist; Tom Mandrake	Set in a "Zero Hour" DC universe.
Superboy #1–2	Writer; Fabian Nicieza; Artists; Karl Moline; Jose Marzan Jr	Set in a "Zero Hour" DC universe.
Superboy and the Legion of Super-Heroes #1–2	Writer; Stuart Moore; Artists; Gus Storms; Mark Farmer	Set in a Crisis on Infinite Earths DC universe.
Supergirl: Matrix #1–2	Writer; Keith Giffen; Artist; Timothy Green II	Set in a "Zero Hour" DC universe.
Superman #1–2	Writer; Dan Jurgens; Artists; Lee Weeks; Dan Jurgens	Set in a pre-"Flashpoint" DC universe.
Superman: The Man of Steel #1–2	Writer; Louise Simonson; Artists; June Brigman; Roy Richardson	Set in a "Zero Hour" DC universe.
Swamp Thing #1–2	Writer; Len Wein; Artist; Kelley Jones	Set in a Crisis on Infinite Earths DC universe.
The Atom #1–2	Writer; Tom Peyer; Artists; Steve Yeowell; Andy Owens	Set in a pre-"Flashpoint" DC universe.
The Flash #1–2	Writer; Dan Abnett; Artist; Federico Dallocchio	Set in a Crisis on Infinite Earths DC universe.
Titans #1–2	Writer; Fabian Nicieza; Artists; Ron Wagner; Jose Marzan	Set in a pre-"Flashpoint" DC universe.
Wonder Woman #1–2	Writer; Larry Hama; Artist; Josh Middleton	Set in a Crisis on Infinite Earths DC universe.
World's Finest Comics #1–2	Writer; Paul Levitz; Artists; Jim Fern; Joe Rubinstein; Shannon Wheeler	Set in a Crisis on Infinite Earths DC universe.

=== Maxiseries ===
Title	Initial creative team^{[note3]}	Notes / References
Batman Eternal #1–52; April 2014 – April 2015	Writers; Scott Snyder; James Tynion IV; John Layman; Ray Fawkes; Tim Seeley; Artists; Jason Fabok; Dustin Nguyen	A year-long weekly series featuring Batman, his allies, and others in Gotham City. John Layman announced in January 2014 that he would no longer be a part of the project. His work on the first 21 issues will still be released as planned. Kyle Higgins was chosen as Layman's replacement at the end of January 2014.
The New 52: Futures End #0–48; May 2014 – April 2015	Writers; Jeff Lemire; Keith Giffen; Brian Azzarello; Dan Jurgens; Artists; Ethan Van Sciver; Patrick Zircher; Jesus Merino; Dan Green; Dan Jurgens; Mark Irwin; Aaron Lopresti; Art Thibert	An eleven-month weekly series set five years in The New 52's future. Lemire stated the series is "an exploration of DC's past, present and its future." Batman Beyond will make his in-continuity debut in the series. The series will start with a free zero issue, released on Free Comic Book Day May 3, 2014, with issue 1 releasing May 7, 2014.
Earth 2: World's End #1–26; October 2014 – April 2015	Writers; Daniel H. Wilson; Marguerite Bennet; Mike Johnson; Artists; Adrian Syaf; Eddy Barrows; Jorge Jimenez; Stephen Segovia; Paulo Siqeira; Tyler Kirkham; Ed Benes	Announced as an untitled weekly project in February 2014, it will serve as a follow-up to the September 2014 "Futures End" event. Dan DiDio revealed that it "will be set in the current DCU timeline that will have direct implications on what's happening with the 'five years later' storyline. And you'll see a level of connectivity that I think will help really bring into focus where we see the future of the DCU heading." He also added that it will be more "world-building" than character focused. In April 2014, the title was revealed to be Earth 2: World's End, indicating it would be focused on the Earth 2 universe, along with revealing the creative team. In May 2014, Paul Levitz revealed that he had left the project. Tom Taylor is a contributing writer to the series, working with Bennet to connect the monthly Earth 2 title to the weekly series, by presenting smaller, more intimate tales set in the World's End narrative.

== Anniversary events ==
To celebrate the anniversary of The New 52, which began in September 2011, DC published unique events in subsequent years during the month of September. In September 2012, all publishing books released a zero numbered issue for "Zero Month", telling the New 52 origins for many characters. In September 2013, titles were released using a point system, highlighting many of DC's villains for "Villains Month". However, not all publishing titles at the time produced a "Villains Month" title, with some, such as Justice League, releasing four during the month. In 2014, all ongoing titles in September tie in to The New 52: Futures End, and depict possible events five years in the future. Titles were released as [Title]: Futures End #1. For example, Batman's issue was released as Batman: Futures End #1.

Title	"Zero Month" September 2012	"Villains Month" September 2013	"The New 52: Futures End" September 2014
Action Comics	Yes	#23.1 titled Cyborg Superman #1 #23.2 titled Zod #1 #23.3 titled Lex Luthor #1 #23.4 titled Metallo #1	Yes
All-Star Western	Yes	No	—N/a
Animal Man	Yes	No	—N/a
Aquaman	Yes	#23.1 titled Black Manta #1 #23.2 titled Ocean Master #1	Yes
Aquaman and the Others	—N/a	—N/a	Yes
Arkham Manor	—N/a	—N/a	—N/a
Batgirl	Yes	No	Yes
Batman	Yes	#23.1 titled Joker #1 #23.2 titled Riddler #1 #23.3 titled Penguin #1 #23.4 titled Bane #1	Yes
Batman and...	Yes	#23.1 titled Two-Face #1 #23.2 titled Court of Owls #1 #23.3 titled Ra's al Ghul and the League of Assassins #1 #23.4 titled Killer Croc #1	Yes
Batman, Incorporated	Yes	No	—N/a
Batman/Superman	—N/a	#3.1 titled Doomsday #1	Yes
Batman: The Dark Knight	Yes	#23.1 titled Ventriloquist #1 #23.2 titled Mr. Freeze #1 #23.3 titled Clayface #1 #23.4 titled Joker's Daughter #1	—N/a
Batwing	Yes	No	Yes
Batwoman	Yes	No	Yes
Birds of Prey	Yes	No	Yes
Blackhawks	—N/a	—N/a	—N/a
Blue Beetle	Yes	—N/a	—N/a
Booster Gold	—N/a	—N/a	Yes
Captain Atom	Yes	—N/a	—N/a
Catwoman	Yes	No	Yes
Constantine	—N/a	No	Yes
DC Universe Presents	Yes	—N/a	—N/a
Deathstroke (vol. 2)	Yes	—N/a	—N/a
Deathstroke (vol. 3)	—N/a	—N/a	—N/a
Demon Knights	Yes	—N/a	—N/a
Detective Comics	Yes	#23.1 titled Poison Ivy #1 #23.2 titled Harley Quinn #1 #23.3 titled Scarecrow #1 #23.4 titled Man-Bat #1	Yes
Dial H	Yes	—N/a	—N/a
Earth 2	Yes	#15.1 titled DeSaad #1 #15.2 titled Solomon Grundy #1	Yes
Frankenstein, Agent of S.H.A.D.E.	Yes	—N/a	—N/a
G.I. Combat	Yes	—N/a	—N/a
Gotham Academy	—N/a	—N/a	—N/a
Gotham by Midnight	—N/a	—N/a	—N/a
Grayson	—N/a	—N/a	Yes
Green Arrow	Yes	#23.1 titled Count Vertigo #1	Yes
Green Lantern	Yes	#23.1 titled Relic #1 #23.2 titled Mongul #1 #23.3 titled Black Hand #1 #23.4 titled Sinestro #1	Yes
Green Lantern Corps	Yes	No	Yes
Green Lantern: New Guardians	Yes	No	Yes
Grifter	Yes	—N/a	—N/a
Harley Quinn	—N/a	—N/a	Yes
Hawk & Dove	—N/a	—N/a	—N/a
I, Vampire	Yes	—N/a	—N/a
Infinity Man and the Forever People	—N/a	—N/a	Yes
Justice League	Yes	#23.1 titled Darkseid #1 #23.2 titled Lobo #1 #23.3 titled Dial E #1 #23.4 titled Secret Society #1	Yes
Justice League 3000	—N/a	—N/a	No
Justice League Dark	Yes	#23.1 titled The Creeper #1 #23.2 titled Eclipso #1	Yes
Justice League International	—N/a	—N/a	—N/a
Justice League of America	—N/a	#7.1 titled Deadshot #1. #7.2 titled Killer Frost #1 #7.3 titled Shadow Thief #1 #7.4 titled Black Adam #1	—N/a
Justice League of America's Vibe	—N/a	No	—N/a
Justice League United	—N/a	—N/a	Yes
Katana	—N/a	No	—N/a
Klarion	—N/a	—N/a	—N/a
Larfleeze	—N/a	No	—N/a
Legion Lost	Yes	—N/a	—N/a
Legion of Super-Heroes	Yes	—N/a	—N/a
Lobo	—N/a	—N/a	—N/a
Men of War	—N/a	—N/a	—N/a
Mister Terrific	—N/a	—N/a	—N/a
New Suicide Squad	—N/a	—N/a	Yes
Nightwing	Yes	No	—N/a
O.M.A.C.	—N/a	—N/a	—N/a
Red Hood and the Outlaws	Yes	No	Yes
Red Lanterns	Yes	No	Yes
Resurrection Man	Yes	—N/a	—N/a
Secret Origins	—N/a	—N/a	No
Secret Six	—N/a	—N/a	—N/a
Sinestro	—N/a	—N/a	Yes
Static Shock	—N/a	—N/a	—N/a
Star-Spangled War Stories Featuring G.I. Zombie	—N/a	—N/a	Yes
Stormwatch	Yes	No	—N/a
Suicide Squad	Yes	No	—N/a
Superboy	Yes	No	Yes
Supergirl	Yes	No	Yes
Superman	Yes	#23.1 titled Bizarro #1 #23.2 titled Brainiac #1 #23.3 titled H'El #1 #23.4 titled Parasite #1	Yes
Superman Unchained	—N/a	—N/a	—N/a
Superman/Wonder Woman	—N/a	—N/a	Yes
Swamp Thing	Yes	#23.1 titled Arcane #1	Yes
Sword of Sorcery	Yes	—N/a	—N/a
Talon	Yes	No	—N/a
Team 7	Yes	—N/a	—N/a
Teen Titans (vol. 4)	Yes	#23.1 titled Trigon #1 #23.2 titled Deathstroke #1	—N/a
Teen Titans (vol. 5)	—N/a	—N/a	Yes
The Flash	Yes	#23.1 titled Grodd #1 #23.2 titled Reverse-Flash #1 #23.3 titled The Rogues #1	Yes
The Fury of Firestorm: The Nuclear Men	Yes	—N/a	—N/a
The Green Team: Teen Trillionaires	—N/a	No	—N/a
The Movement	—N/a	No	—N/a
The Ravagers	Yes	—N/a	—N/a
The Savage Hawkman	Yes	—N/a	—N/a
Threshold	—N/a	—N/a	—N/a
Trinity of Sin	—N/a	—N/a	—N/a
Trinity of Sin: Pandora	—N/a	No	Yes
Trinity of Sin: The Phantom Stranger	Yes	No	Yes
Voodoo	Yes	—N/a	—N/a
Wonder Woman	Yes	#23.1 titled Cheetah #1 #23.2 titled First Born #1	Yes
Worlds' Finest	Yes	No	Yes

== Collected editions ==
All fifty-two number ones from the launch titles were collected into a single hardcover volume, DC Comics The New 52, released in December 2011. The following year, in December 2012, all zero issues were collected in the DC Comics The New 52 Zero Omnibus. In December 2013, DC released DC Comics The New 52 Villains Omnibus, collecting all of the "Villains Month" titles. In December 2014, DC released Futures End – Five Years Later Omnibus, collecting all of the September 2014 event titles.

With the announcement of the initial collected editions to be released featuring New 52 stories, DC revealed that some series will initially be collected as hardcovers, while others will go straight to trade paperbacks.

Title	Page count	Material collected	Publication date	ISBN	Ref
All-Star Western Volume 1: Guns and Gotham TP	192	All-Star Western Vol. 3 #1–6	October 31, 2012	978-1-4012-3709-7	
All-Star Western Volume 2: The War of Lords and Owls TP	200	All-Star Western Vol. 3 #7–12	March 6, 2013	978-1-4012-3851-3	
All-Star Western Volume 3: The Black Diamond Probability TP	176	All-Star Western Vol. 3 #0, 13–16	November 6, 2013	978-1-4012-4399-9	
All-Star Western Volume 4: Gold Standard TP	176	All-Star Western Vol. 3 #17–21	May 7, 2014	978-1-4012-4626-6	
All-Star Western Volume 5: Man Out of Time TP	192	All-Star Western Vol. 3 #22–28	October 22, 2014	978-1-4012-4993-9	
All-Star Western Volume 6: End of the Trail TP	144	All-Star Western Vol. 3 #29-34	March 31, 2015	978-1-4012-5413-1	
Animal Man by Jeff Lemire Omnibus HC	816	Animal Man Vol. 2 #0–29, Animal Man Annual Vol. 2 #1-2 & Swamp Thing Vol. 5 #12 & 17	December 24, 2019	978-1-4012-8941-6	
Animal Man Volume 1: The Hunt TP	144	Animal Man Vol. 2 #1–6	May 2, 2012	978-1-4012-3507-9	
Animal Man Volume 2: Animal vs. Man TP	160	Animal Man Vol. 2 #0, 7–11, Animal Man Annual Vol. 2 #1	January 9, 2013	978-1-4012-3800-1	
Animal Man Volume 3: Rotworld – The Red Kingdom TP	232	Animal Man Vol. 2 #12–19, Swamp Thing Vol. 5 #12, 17–18	September 4, 2013	978-1-4012-4262-6	
Animal Man Volume 4: Splinter Species TP	144	Animal Man Vol. 2 #20–23, Animal Man Annual Vol. 2 #2	March 5, 2014	978-1-4012-4644-0	
Animal Man Volume 5: Evolve or Die! TP	144	Animal Man Vol. 2 #24–29	November 5, 2014	978-1-4012-4994-6	
Absolute Batman: The Court of Owls HC	384	Batman Vol. 2 #1–11	October 28, 2015	978-1-4012-5910-5	
Absolute Batman Incorporated HC	648	Batman Incorporated Vol. 1 #1-8, Batman Incorporated Vol. 2 #1–13, Batman Incorporated: Leviathan Rises #1, Batman Incorporated: Special #1	January 13, 2015	978-1-4012-5121-5	
Absolute Justice League: Origin HC	360	stories from Justice League Vol. 2 #0-12	October 3, 2017	978-1-4012-7437-5	
Absolute Wonder Woman by Brian Azzarello & Cliff Chiang Vol. 1 HC	484	Wonder Woman Vol. 4 #0-18	February 28, 2017	978-1-4012-6848-0	
Absolute Wonder Woman by Brian Azzarello & Cliff Chiang Vol. 2 HC	456	Wonder Woman Vol. 4 #19-35 and a story from Secret Origins Vol. 3 #6	February 13, 2018	978-1-4012-7749-9	
Aquaman by Geoff Johns Omnibus HC	728	Aquaman Vol. 7 #0-25, #23.1, #23.2, Justice League Vol.2 #15-17	December 18, 2018	978-1-4012-8546-3	
Aquaman Volume 1: The Trench HC	144	Aquaman Vol. 7 #1–6	September 5, 2012	978-1-4012-3551-2	
Aquaman Volume 2: The Others HC	160	Aquaman Vol. 7 #7–13	May 15, 2013	978-1-4012-4016-5	
Aquaman Volume 3: Throne of Atlantis HC	176	Aquaman Vol. 7 #0, 14–16, Justice League Vol. 2 #15–17	November 13, 2013	978-1-4012-4309-8	
Aquaman Volume 4: Death of a King HC	192	Aquaman Vol. 7 #17–19, 21–25	May 14, 2014	978-1-4012-4696-9	
Aquaman Volume 5: Sea of Storms HC	200	Aquaman Vol. 7 #26–31, Aquaman Annual Vol. 7 #2	November 19, 2014	978-1-4012-5039-3	
Aquaman Volume 6: Maelstrom HC	240	Aquaman Vol. 7 #32–40, stories from Secret Origins Vol. 3 #2 and #5	July 1, 2015	978-1-4012-5441-4	
Aquaman and the Others Volume 1: Legacy of Gold TP	176	Aquaman and the Others #1–5, Aquaman Vol. 7 # 20, Aquaman Annual Vol. 7 #1	January 21, 2015	978-1-4012-5038-6	
Aquaman and the Others Volume 2: Alignment Earth TP	176	Aquaman and the Others #6–11, Aquaman: Futures End #1, Aquaman and the Others: Futures End #1	June 24, 2015	978-1-4012-5331-8	
Arkham Manor TP	144	Arkham Manor #1–6	July 22, 2015	978-1-4012-5458-2	
Batgirl Volume 1: The Darkest Reflection HC	144	Batgirl Vol. 4 #1–6	July 11, 2012	978-1-4012-3475-1	
Batgirl Volume 1: Batgirl of Burnside HC	176	Batgirl Vol. 4 #35–40	May 27, 2015	978-1-4012-5332-5	
Batgirl Volume 2: Knightfall Descends HC	144	Batgirl Vol. 4 #0, 7–13	February 6, 2013	978-1-4012-3816-2	
Batgirl Volume 3: Death of the Family HC	224	Batgirl Vol. 4 #14–19, Batman Vol. 2 #17, Batgirl Annual Vol. 4 #1, a story from Young Romance: A New 52 Valentine's Day Special #1	October 23, 2013	978-1-4012-4259-6	
Batgirl Volume 4: Wanted HC	192	Batgirl Vol. 4 #20–26, Batman: The Dark Knight Vol. 2 #23.1	May 21, 2014	978-1-4012-4629-7	
Batgirl Volume 5: Deadline HC	232	Batgirl Vol. 4 #27–34, Batgirl Annual Vol. 4 #2	December 17, 2014	978-1-4012-5041-6	
Batman by Francis Manapul & Brian Buccellato Deluxe Edition HC	328	Detective Comics Vol. 2 #30-34, #37-44, Detective Comics: Future's End #1, Detective Comics: Endgame #1 and the Detective Comics Sneak Peek!	November 27, 2018	978-1-4012-8485-5	
Batman by Scott Snyder & Greg Capullo Omnibus Vol. 1 HC	900	Batman Vol. 2 #0-33, #23.2, Batman Annual Vol. 2 #1-2	November 5, 2019	978-1-4012-9884-5	
Batman Volume 1: The Court of Owls HC	176	Batman Vol. 2 #1–7	May 9, 2012	978-1-4012-3541-3	
Batman Volume 2: City of Owls HC	192	Batman Vol. 2 #8–12, Batman Annual Vol. 2 #1	March 20, 2013	978-1-4012-3777-6	
Batman Volume 3: Death of the Family HC	176	Batman Vol. 2 #13–17	October 30, 2013	978-1-4012-4234-3	
Batman Volume 4: Zero Year-Secret City HC	176	Batman Vol. 2 #21–24	May 7, 2014	978-1-4012-4508-5	
Batman Volume 5: Zero Year-Dark City HC	240	Batman Vol. 2 #25–27, 29–33	October 15, 2014	978-1-4012-4885-7	
Batman Volume 6: The Graveyard Shift HC	224	Batman Vol. 2 #0, 18–20, 28, 34, Batman Annual Vol. 2 #2	April 29, 2015	978-1-4012-5230-4	
Batman Volume 7: Endgame HC	192	Batman Vol. 2 #35–40	September 30, 2015	978-1-4012-5689-0	
Batman: The Night of the Owls HC	360	Batman Vol. 2 #8–9, Batman Annual Vol. 2 #1, Detective Comics Vol. 2 #9, Batman: The Dark Knight Vol. 2 #9, Batwing #9, Batman and Robin Vol. 2 #9, Catwoman Vol. 4 #9, Red Hood and the Outlaws #9, Birds of Prey Vol. 3 #9, Batgirl Vol. 4 #9, Nightwing Vol. 3 #8–9, All-Star Western Vol. 3 #9	February 13, 2013	978-1-4012-3773-8	
Batman: Detective Comics Volume 1: Faces of Death HC	176	Detective Comics Vol. 2 #1–7	June 6, 2012	978-1-4012-3466-9	
Batman: Detective Comics Volume 2: Scare Tactics HC	232	Detective Comics Vol. 2 #0, 8–12, Detective Comics Annual Vol. 2 #1	April 10, 2013	978-1-4012-3840-7	
Batman: Detective Comics Volume 3: Emperor Penguin HC	192	Detective Comics Vol. 2 #13–18	November 20, 2013	978-1-4012-4266-4	
Batman: Detective Comics Volume 4: The Wrath HC	256	Detective Comics Vol. 2 #19–24, Detective Comics Annual Vol. 2 #2	June 25, 2014	978-1-4012-4633-4	
Batman: Detective Comics Volume 5: Gothtopia HC	176	Detective Comics Vol. 2 #25–29	November 19, 2014	978-1-4012-4998-4	
Batman: Detective Comics Volume 6: Icarus HC	176	Detective Comics Vol. 2 #30–34, Detective Comics Annual Vol. 2 #3	May 20, 2015		
Batman: Detective Comics Volume 7: Anarky HC	208	Detective Comics Vol. 2 #35–40, Detective Comics: Engame #1, Detective Comics: Futures End #1	January 6, 2016	978-1-4012-5749-1	
Batman and Robin Volume 1: Born to Kill HC	192	Batman and Robin Vol. 2 #1–8	July 4, 2012	978-1-4012-3487-4	
Batman and Robin Volume 2: Pearl HC	160	Batman and Robin Vol. 2 #0, 9–14	June 5, 2013	978-1-4012-4089-9	
Batman and Robin Volume 3: Death of the Family HC	144	Batman and Robin Vol. 2 #15–17, Batman Vol. 2 #17, Batman and Robin Annual Vol. 2 #1	November 27, 2013	978-1-4012-4268-8	
Batman and Robin Volume 4: Requiem for Damian HC	176	Batman and Robin/Batman and... Vol. 2 #18–23	June 4, 2014	978-1-4012-4618-1	
Batman and Robin Volume 5: The Big Burn HC	176	Batman and... Vol. 2 #24–28, Batman and Robin Annual Vol. 2 #2	December 19, 2014	978-1-4012-5059-1	
Batman and Robin Volume 6: The Hunt for Robin HC	256	Batman and Robin Vol. 2 #29–34, Robin Rises: Omega #1	June 24, 2015	978-1-4012-5334-9	
Batman and Robin Volume 7: Robin Rises HC	240	Batman and Robin Vol. 2 #35–40, Robin Rises: Alpha #1, Batman and Robin Annual Vol. 2 #3, Batman and Robin: Futures End #1, a story from Secret Origins Vol. 3 #4	November 18, 2015	978-1-4012-5677-7	
Batman and Robin by Peter J. Tomasi & Patrick Gleason Omnibus HC	1248		December 3, 2019	978-1-4012-9570-7	
Batman Eternal Volume 1 TP	448	Batman Eternal #1–20	November 26, 2014	978-1-4012-5173-4	
Batman Eternal Volume 2 TP	304	Batman Eternal #22–34	July 8, 2015	978-1-4012-5231-1	
Batman Eternal Volume 3 TP	448	Batman Eternal #35–52, Batman Vol. 2 #28	October 7, 2015	978-1-4012-5752-1	
Batman: Eternal Omnibus HC	1208	Batman Eternal #1–52, Batman Vol. 2 #28	September 17, 2019	978-1-4012-9417-5	
Batman, Incorporated Volume 1: Demon Star HC	176	Batman, Incorporated Vol. 2 #0–6	May 8, 2013	978-1-4012-3888-9	
Batman, Incorporated Volume 2: Gotham's Most Wanted HC	240	Batman, Incorporated Vol. 2 #7–13, Batman, Incorporated Special #1	November 27, 2013	978-1-4012-4400-2	
Batman/Superman Volume 1: Cross World HC	144	Batman/Superman #1–4, Justice League Vol. 2 #23.1	April 30, 2014	978-1-4012-4509-2	
Batman/Superman Volume 2: Game Over HC	224	Batman/Superman #5–9, Batman/Superman Annual #1, Worlds' Finest #20–21	November 12, 2014	978-1-4012-4935-9	
Batman/Superman Volume 3: Second Chance HC	160	Batman/Superman #10–15	May 6, 2015	978-1-4012-5424-7	
Batman/Superman Volume 4: Siege HC	200	Batman/Superman #16–20, Batman/Superman Annual #2, Batman/Superman: Futures End #1	December 16, 2015	978-1-4012-5755-2	
Batman/Superman Volume 5: Truth Hurts HC	192	Batman/Superman #21-27	August 16, 2016	978-1-4012-6369-0	
Batman/Superman Volume 6: Universe's Finest HC	224	Batman/Superman #28-32, plus the never-before-published Batman/Superman #33-34 and Batman/Superman Annual #3	April 11, 2017	978-1-4012-6819-0	
Batman: The Dark Knight Volume 1: Knight Terrors HC	208	Batman: The Dark Knight Vol. 2 #1–9	October 3, 2012	978-1-4012-3543-7	
Batman: The Dark Knight Volume 2: Cycle of Violence HC	160	Batman: The Dark Knight Vol. 2 #0, 10–15	July 17, 2013	978-1-4012-4074-5	
Batman: The Dark Knight Volume 3: Mad HC	144	Batman: The Dark Knight Vol. 2 #16–21, Batman: The Dark Knight Annual Vol. 2 #1	January 15, 2014	978-1-4012-4247-3	
Batman: The Dark Knight Volume 4: Clay HC	176	Batman: The Dark Knight Vol. 2 #22–29	July 30, 2014	978-1-4012-4620-4	
Batwing Volume 1: The Lost Kingdom TP	144	Batwing #1–6	July 18, 2012	978-1-4012-3476-8	
Batwing Volume 2: In the Shadow of the Ancients TP	144	Batwing #0, 7–12	March 27, 2013	978-1-4012-3791-2	
Batwing Volume 3: Enemy of the State TP	144	Batwing #13–18	January 22, 2014	978-1-4012-4403-3	
Batwing Volume 4: Welcome to the Family TP	192	Batwing #19–26	July 30, 2014	978-1401246310	
Batwing Volume 5: Into the Dark TP	208	Batwing #27–34, Batwing: Futures End #1	February 25, 2015		
Batwoman Volume 1: Hydrology HC	160	Batwoman #0 (Jan. 2011), 1–5	June 13, 2012	978-1-4012-3465-2	
Batwoman Volume 2: To Drown the World HC	144	Batwoman #6–11	January 9, 2013	978-1-4012-3790-5	
Batwoman Volume 3: World's Finest HC	160	Batwoman #0 (Nov. 2012), 12–17	September 18, 2013	978-1-4012-4246-6	
Batwoman Volume 4: This Blood is Thick HC	192	Batwoman #18–24	March 26, 2014	978-1-4012-4621-1	
Batwoman Volume 5: Webs TP	272	Batwoman #25–31, Batwoman Annual #1	November 5, 2014		
Batwoman Volume 6: The Unknowns TP	176	Batwoman #35–40, Batwoman: Futures End #1, a story from Secret Origins Vol. 3 #3	July 22, 2015		
Birds of Prey Volume 1: Trouble in Mind TP	160	Birds of Prey Vol. 3 #1–7	September 12, 2012	978-1-4012-3699-1	
Birds of Prey Volume 2: Your Kiss Might Kill TP	144	Birds of Prey Vol. 3 #8–13	April 17, 2013	978-1-4012-3813-1	
Birds of Prey Volume 3: A Clash of Daggers TP	160	Birds of Prey Vol. 3 #13–17, Batgirl Annual Vol. 4 #1	December 18, 2013	978-1-4012-4404-0	
Birds of Prey Volume 4: The Cruelest Cut TP	200	Birds of Prey Vol. 3 #18–24, 26, Talon #9	July 16, 2014	978-1-4012-4635-8	
Birds of Prey Volume 5: Soul Crisis TP	232	Birds of Prey Vol. 3 #25, 27–34, Birds of Prey: Futures End #1	January 21, 2015		
Blackhawks Volume 1: The Great Leap Forward TP	192	Blackhawks Vol. 8 #1–8	November 21, 2012	978-1-4012-3714-1	
Blue Beetle Volume 1: Metamorphosis TP	144	Blue Beetle Vol. 8 #1–6	November 14, 2012	978-1-4012-3713-4	
Blue Beetle Volume 2: Blue Diamond TP	240	Blue Beetle Vol. 8 #0, 7–16, Green Lantern: New Guardians #9	April 24, 2013	978-1-4012-3850-6	
Captain Atom Volume 1: Evolution TP	144	Captain Atom Vol. 4 #1–6	November 28, 2012	978-1-4012-3715-8	
Captain Atom Volume 2: Genesis TP	160	Captain Atom Vol. 4 #0, 7–12	August 21, 2013	978-1-4012-4099-8	
Catwoman Volume 1: The Game TP	144	Catwoman Vol. 4 #1–6	May 16, 2012	978-1-4012-3464-5	
Catwoman Volume 2: Dollhouse TP	144	Catwoman Vol. 4 #7–12	February 27, 2013	978-1-4012-3839-1	
Catwoman Volume 3: Death of the Family TP	176	Catwoman Vol. 4 #0, 13–18, a story from Young Romance: A New 52 Valentine's Day Special #1	October 16, 2013	978-1-4012-4272-5	
Catwoman Volume 4: Gotham Underground TP	224	Catwoman Vol. 4 #19–24, 26, Catwoman Annual Vol. 4 #1, Batman: The Dark Knight Vol. 2 #23.4	May 28, 2014	978-1401246273	
Catwoman Volume 5: Race of Thieves TP	232	Catwoman Vol. 4 #25, 27–34	November 12, 2014		
Catwoman Volume 6: Keeper of the Castle TP	192	Catwoman Vol. 4 #35–40, Catwoman Annual Vol. 4 #2	July 29, 2015		
Constantine Volume 1: The Spark and the Flame TP	144	Constantine #1–6	February 12, 2014	978-1-4012-4323-4	
Constantine Volume 2: Blight TP	144	Constantine #7–12	August 6, 2014		
Constantine Volume 3: The Voice in the Fire TP	144	Constantine #13–17, Constantine: Futures End #1	February 18, 2015		
Constantine Volume 4: The Apocalypse Road TP	144	Constantine #18–23	August 19, 2015		
Convergence HC	320	Convergence #0–8	October 7, 2015		
Convergence: Crisis Book One TP	240	Convergence: Adventures of Superman #1–2, Convergence: Batman and the Outsiders #1–2, Convergence: Green Lantern Corps #1–2, Convergence: Hawkman #1–2, Convergence: Superboy and the Legion of Super-Heroes #1–2	October 14, 2015		
Convergence: Crisis Book Two TP	240	Convergence: Justice League of America #1–2, Convergence: Swamp Thing #1–2, Convergence: The Flash #1–2, Convergence: The New Teen Titans #1–2, Convergence: Wonder Woman #1–2	October 14, 2015		
Convergence: Flashpoint Book One TP	240	Convergence: Batgirl #1–2, Convergence: Justice League #1–2, Convergence: Nightwing/Oracle #1–2, Convergence: Superman #1–2, Convergence: The Question #1–2	October 21, 2015		
Convergence: Flashpoint Book Two TP	240	Convergence: Batman and Robin #1–2, Convergence: Harley Quinn #1–2, Convergence: Speed Force #1–2, Convergence: The Atom #1–2, Convergence: Titans #1–2	October 21, 2015		
Convergence: Infinite Earths Book One TP	240	Convergence: Action Comics #1–2, Convergence: Detective Comics #1–2, Convergence: Infinity Inc. #1–2, Convergence: Justice Society of America #1–2, Convergence: World's Finest Comics #1–2	October 28, 2015		
Convergence: Infinite Earths Book Two TP	240	Convergence: Blue Beetle #1–2, Convergence: Booster Gold #1–2, Convergence: Crime Syndicate #1–2, Convergence: Plastic Man and the Freedom Fighters #1–2, Convergence: Shazam! #1–2	October 28, 2015		
Convergence: Zero Hour Book One TP	240	Convergence: Catwoman #1–2, Convergence: Green Arrow #1–2, Convergence: Justice League International #1–2, Convergence: Suicide Squad #1–2, Convergence: Superboy #1–2	October 7, 2015		
Convergence: Zero Hour Book Two TP	240	Convergence: Aquaman #1–2, Convergence: Batman: Shadow of the Bat #1–2, Convergence: Green Lantern/Parallax #1–2, Convergence: Supergirl: Matrix #1–2, Convergence: Superman: Man of Steel #1–2	October 7, 2015		
Damian: Son of Batman Deluxe Edition HC	176	Damian: Son of Batman #1–4, Batman #666	July 16, 2014	978-1401246426	
DC Comics Presents: The New 52 #1	96	Animal Man Vol. 2 #1, Justice League Dark #1, I, Vampire #1 and Swamp Thing Vol. 5 #1	January 4, 2012		
DC Comics: The New 52 HC	1,216	Action Comics Vol. 2 #1, All-Star Western Vol. 3 #1, Animal Man Vol. 2 #1, Aquaman Vol. 7 #1, Batgirl Vol. 4 #1, Batman Vol. 2 #1, Batman and Robin Vol. 2 #1, Batman: The Dark Knight Vol. 2 #1, Batwing #1, Batwoman #1, Birds of Prey Vol. 3 #1, Blackhawks Vol. 8 #1, Blue Beetle Vol. 8 #1, Captain Atom Vol. 4 #1, Catwoman Vol. 4 #1, DC Comics Presents #1, Deathstroke Vol. 2 #1, Demon Knights #1, Detective Comics Vol. 2 #1, Frankenstein, Agent of S.H.A.D.E. #1, Green Arrow Vol. 6 #1, Green Lantern Vol. 5 #1, Green Lantern Corps Vol. 3 #1, Green Lantern: New Guardians #1, Grifter Vol. 3 #1, Hawk & Dove Vol. 4 #1, I, Vampire #1, Justice League Vol. 2 #1, Justice League Dark #1, Justice League International Vol. 3 #1, Legion Lost Vol. 2 #1, Legion of Super-Heroes Vol. 7 #1, Men of War Vol. 2 #1, Mister Terrific #1, Nightwing Vol. 3 #1, O.M.A.C. #1, Red Hood and the Outlaws #1, Red Lanterns #1, Resurrection Man Vol. 2 #1, Static Shock #1, Stormwatch Vol. 3 #1, Suicide Squad Vol. 4 #1, Superboy Vol. 5 #1, Supergirl Vol. 6 #1, Superman Vol. 3 #1, Swamp Thing Vol. 5 #1, Teen Titans Vol. 4 #1, The Flash Vol. 4 #1, The Fury of Firestorm: The Nuclear Men #1, The Savage Hawkman #1, Voodoo Vol. 2 #1, Wonder Woman Vol. 4 #1	December 13, 2011	978-1-4012-3451-5	
DC Comics: The New 52 Zero Omnibus HC	1,328	Action Comics Vol. 2 #0, All-Star Western Vol. 3 #, Animal Man Vol. 2 #0, Aquaman Vol. 7 #0, Batgirl Vol. 4 #0, Batman Vol. 2 #0, Batman and Robin Vol. 2 #0, Batman, Incorporated Vol. 2 #0, Batman: The Dark Knight Vol. 2 #0, Batwing #0, Batwoman #0, Birds of Prey Vol. 3 #0, Blue Beetle Vol. 8 #0, Captain Atom Vol. 4 #0, Catwoman Vol. 4 #0, DC Comics Presents #0, Deathstroke Vol. 2 #0, Demon Knights #0, Detective Comics Vol. 2 #0, Dial H #0, Earth 2 #0, Frankenstein, Agent of S.H.A.D.E. #0, G.I. Combat Vol. 2 #0, Green Arrow Vol. 6 #0, Green Lantern Vol. 5 #0, Green Lantern Corps Vol. 3 #0, Green Lantern: New Guardians #0, Grifter Vol. 3 #0, I, Vampire #0, Justice League Vol. 2 #0, Justice League Dark #0, Legion Lost Vol. 2 #0, Legion of Super-Heroes Vol. 7 #0, Nightwing Vol. 3 #0, Red Hood and the Outlaws #0, Red Lanterns #0, Resurrection Man Vol. 2 #0, Stormwatch Vol. 3 #0, Suicide Squad Vol. 4 #0, Superboy Vol. 5 #0, Supergirl Vol. 6 #0, Superman Vol. 3 #0, Swamp Thing Vol. 5 #0, Sword of Sorcery Vol. 2 #0, Talon #0, Team 7 Vol. 2 #0, Teen Titans Vol. 4 #0, The Flash Vol. 4 #0, The Fury of Firestorm: The Nuclear Men #0, The Ravagers #0, The Savage Hawkman #0, The Phantom Stranger Vol. 4 #0, Voodoo Vol. 2 #0, Wonder Woman Vol. 4 #0, Worlds' Finest #0	December 12, 2012	978-1-4012-3884-1	
DC Comics: The New 52 Villains Omnibus HC	1,184	Action Comics Vol. 2 #23.1–23.4, Aquaman Vol. 7 #23.1–23.2, Batman Vol. 2 #23.1–23.4, Batman and Robin Vol. 2 #23.1–23.4, Batman/Superman #3.1, Batman: The Dark Knight Vol. 2 #23.1–23.4, Detective Comics Vol. 2 #23.1–23.4, Earth 2 #15.1–15.2, The Flash Vol. 4 #23.1–23.3, Green Arrow Vol. 6 #23.1, Green Lantern Vol. 5 #23.1–23.4, Justice League Vol. 2 #23.1–23.4, Justice League Dark #23.1–23.2, Justice League of America Vol. 3 #7.1–7.4, Superman Vol. 3 #23.1–23.4, Swamp Thing Vol. 5 #23.1, Teen Titans Vol. 4 #23.1–23.2, Wonder Woman Vol. 4 #23.1–23.2	December 11, 2013	978-1-4012-4496-5	
DC Comics: Zero Year HC	448	Action Comics Vol. 2 #25, Batgirl Vol. 4 #25, Batman Vol. 2 #24–25, Batwing #25, Batwoman #25, Birds of Prey Vol. 3 #25, Catwoman Vol. 4 #25, Detective Comics Vol. 2 #25, Green Arrow Vol. 6 #25, Green Lantern Corps Vol. 3 #25, Nightwing Vol. 3 #25, Red Hood and The Outlaws #25, The Flash Vol. 4 #25	October 29, 2014		
DC Universe Presents Volume 1: Deadman/Challengers of the Unknown TP	192	DC Universe Presents #1–8	November 28, 2012	978-1-4012-3716-5	
DC Universe Presents Volume 2: Vandal Savage TP	144	DC Universe Presents #0, 9–12	August 21, 2013	978-1-4012-4076-9	
DC Universe Presents Volume 3: Black Lightning and Blue Devil TP	160	DC Universe Presents #13–19	February 26, 2014	978-1-4012-4277-0	
Deathstroke Volume 1: Legacy TP	192	Deathstroke Vol. 2 #1–8	August 8, 2012	978-1-4012-3481-2	
Deathstroke Volume 1: Gods of War TP	144	Deathstroke Vol. 3 #1–6	June 17, 2015		
Deathstroke Volume 2: Lobo Hunt TP	296	Deathstroke Vol. 2 #0, 9–20	February 5, 2014	978-1-4012-4038-7	
Demon Knights Volume 1: Seven Against the Dark TP	160	Demon Knights #1–7	July 11, 2012	978-1-4012-3472-0	
Demon Knights Volume 2: The Avalon Trap TP	144	Demon Knights #0, 8–12	May 22, 2013	978-1-4012-4039-4	
Demon Knights Volume 3: The Gathering Storm TP	256	Demon Knights #13–23	January 15, 2014	978-1-4012-4269-5	
Dial H Deluxe Edition HC	368	Dial H #0–15	May 6, 2015		
Dial H Volume 1: Into You TP	168	Dial H #0–6	April 17, 2013	978-1-4012-3775-2	
Dial H Volume 2: Exchange TP	240	Dial H #7–15, Justice League Vol. 2 #23.3	February 5, 2014	978-1-4012-4383-8	
Earth 2 Volume 1: The Gathering HC	160	Earth 2 #1–6	March 13, 2013	978-1-4012-3774-5	
Earth 2 Volume 2: The Tower of Fate HC	176	Earth 2 #0, 7–12, a story from DC Universe Presents #0	October 2, 2013	978-1-4012-4311-1	
Earth 2 Volume 3: Battle Cry HC	160	Earth 2 #13–16, 15.1, Earth 2 Annual #1	April 9, 2014	978-1-4012-4615-0	
Earth 2 Volume 4: The Dark Age HC	144	Earth 2 #17–20, Earth 2 Annual #2	October 8, 2014		
Earth 2 Volume 5: The Kryptonian HC	176	Earth 2 #21–26, Earth 2: Futures End #1	April 15, 2015		
Earth 2 Volume 6: Collision HC	144	Earth 2 27–32	November 25, 2015		
Earth 2: World's End Volume 1 TP	272	Earth 2: World's End #1–11	May 13, 2015		
Earth 2: World's End Volume 2 TP	360	Earth 2: World's End #12–26	December 2, 2015		
Forever Evil HC	240	Forever Evil #1–7	September 3, 2014		
Forever Evil: A.R.G.U.S. TP	144	Forever Evil: A.R.G.U.S. #1–6	September 24, 2014		
Forever Evil: Arkham War TP	200	Forever Evil: Arkham War #1–6, Batman Vol. 2 #23.4, Forever Evil Aftermath: Batman Vs. Bane #1	September 17, 2014		
Forever Evil: Blight TP	400	Constantine #9–12, Justice League Dark #24–29, Trinity of Sin: Pandora #6–9, Trinity of Sin: The Phantom Stranger Vol. 4 #14–17	September 24, 2014		
Forever Evil: Rogues Rebellion TP	160	Forever Evil: Rogues Rebellion #1–6, The Flash Vol. 4 #23.1	September 24, 2014		
Frankenstein, Agent of S.H.A.D.E. Volume 1: War of the Monsters TP	160	Frankenstein, Agent of S.H.A.D.E. #1–7	June 20, 2012	978-1-4012-3471-3	
Frankenstein, Agent of S.H.A.D.E. Volume 2: Secrets of the Dead TP	144	Frankenstein, Agent of S.H.A.D.E. #0, 8–16, Men of War Vol. 2 #8	April 17, 2013	978-1-4012-3818-6	
Futures End: Five Years Later Omnibus HC	912	Action Comics: Futures End #1, Aquaman: Futures End #1, Aquaman and the Others: Futures End #1, Batgirl: Futures End #1, Batman: Futures End #1, Batman and Robin: Futures End #1, Batman/Superman: Futures End #1, Batwing: Futures End #1, Batwoman: Futures End #1, Birds of Prey: Futures End #1, Booster Gold: Futures End #1, Catwoman: Futures End #1, Constantine: Futures End #1, Detective Comics: Futures End #1, Earth 2: Futures End #1, Grayson: Futures End #1, Green Arrow: Futures End #1, Green Lantern: Futures End #1, Green Lantern Corps: Futures End #1, Green Lantern: New Guardians: Futures End #1, Harley Quinn: Futures End #1, Infinity Man and the Forever People: Futures End #1, Justice League: Futures End #1, Justice League Dark: Futures End #1, Justice League United: Futures End #1, New Suicide Squad: Futures End #1, Red Hood and the Outlaws: Futures End #1, Red Lanterns: Futures End #1, Sinestro: Futures End #1, Star Spangled War Stories Featuring G.I. Zombie: Futures End #1, Superboy: Futures End #1, Supergirl: Futures End #1, Superman: Futures End #1, Superman/Wonder Woman: Futures End #1, Swamp Thing: Futures End #1, Teen Titans: Futures End #1, The Flash: Futures End #1, Trinity of Sin: Pandora: Futures End #1, Trinity of Sin: Phantom Stranger: Futures End #1, Wonder Woman: Futures End #1, Worlds' Finest: Futures End #1	December 17, 2014		
G.I. Combat Volume 1: The War That Time Forgot TP	224	G.I. Combat Vol. 2 #0–7	April 3, 2013	978-1-4012-3853-7	
G.I. Zombie: A Star-Spangled War Story TP	176	Star-Spangled War Stories Featuring G.I. Zombie #1–8, Star Spangled War Stories Featuring G.I. Zombie: Futures End #1	August 26, 2015		
Gotham Academy Volume 1: Welcome to Gotham Academy TP	144	Gotham Academy #1–6	June 17, 2015		
Gotham by Midnight Volume 1: We Do Not Sleep TP	128	Gotham by Midnight #1–5	August 19, 2015		
Grayson Volume 1: Agents of Spyral HC	160	Grayson #1–4, a story from Secret Origins Vol. 3 #8, Grayson: Futures End #1	June 3, 2015		
Grayson Volume 2: We All Die At Dawn TP	144	Grayson #5–8, Grayson Annual #1	January 20, 2016		
Green Arrow Volume 1: The Midas Touch TP	144	Green Arrow Vol. 6 #1–6	May 30, 2012	978-1-4012-3486-7	
Green Arrow Volume 2: Triple Threat TP	144	Green Arrow Vol. 6 #7–13	January 23, 2013	978-1-4012-3842-1	
Green Arrow Volume 3: Harrow TP	144	Green Arrow Vol. 6 #0, 14–16, The Savage Hawkman #14, Justice League Vol. 2 #8	September 11, 2013	978-1-4012-4405-7	
Green Arrow Volume 4: The Kill Machine TP	192	Green Arrow Vol. 6 #17–24	March 19, 2014	978-1-4012-4690-7	
Green Arrow Volume 5: The Outsiders War TP	176	Green Arrow Vol. 6 #25–31	October 8, 2014		
Green Arrow Volume 6: Broken TP	128	Green Arrow Vol. 6 #32–34, Green Arrow: Futures End #1, a story from Secret Origins Vol. 3 #4	April 29, 2015		
Green Arrow Volume 7: Kingdom TP	144	Green Arrow Vol. 6 #35–40	November 15, 2015		
Green Arrow by Jeff Lemire Deluxe Edition HC	464	Green Arrow Vol. 6 #17–34, Green Arrow: Futures End #1, a story from Secret Origins Vol. 3 #4	December 30, 2015		
Green Lantern by Geoff Johns Omnibus Vol. 3 HC	1104	Green Lantern Vol. 4 #53-67, Green Lantern: Emerald Warriors Vol. 1 #8-10, Green Lantern Corps Vol. 2 #58-60, Green Lantern Vol. 5 #1–20, Green Lantern Annual Vol. 5 #1, Larfleeze Christmas Special #1	April 19, 2016	978-1-4012-5820-7	
Green Lantern Volume 1: Sinestro HC	160	Green Lantern Vol. 5 #1–6	May 16, 2012	978-1-4012-3454-6	
Green Lantern Volume 2: The Revenge of Black Hand HC	192	Green Lantern Vol. 5 #7–12, Green Lantern Annual Vol. 5 #1	January 2, 2013	978-1-4012-3766-0	
Green Lantern Volume 3: The End HC	264	Green Lantern Vol. 5 #0, 13–20	October 16, 2013	978-1401244088	
Green Lantern Volume 4: Dark Days HC	200	Green Lantern Vol. 5 #21–26, 23.1, Green Lantern Annual Vol. 5 #2	April 23, 2014	978-1-4012-4744-7	
Green Lantern Volume 5: Test of Wills HC	256	Green Lantern Vol. 5 #27–34, Green Lantern Corps Vol. 3 #31–33	October 29, 2014		
Green Lantern Volume 6: The Life Equation HC	200	Green Lantern Vol. 5 #35–40, Green Lantern Annual Vol. 5 #3, a story from Secret Origins Vol. 3 #3	May 13, 2015		
Green Lantern: Lights Out HC	176	Green Lantern Vol. 5 #23.1, 24, Green Lantern Corps Vol. 3 #24, Green Lantern: New Guardians #23–24, Red Lanterns #24, Green Lantern Annual Vol. 5 #2	June 18, 2014	978-1-4012-4816-1	
Green Lantern: Rise of the Third Army HC	416	Green Lantern Vol. 5 #13–16, Green Lantern Corps Vol. 3 #13–16, Green Lantern: New Guardians #13–16, Red Lanterns #13–16, Green Lantern Corps Annual Vol. 3 #1	September 4, 2013	978-1-4012-4499-6	
Green Lantern: Wrath of the First Lantern HC	416	Green Lantern Vol. 5 #17–20, Green Lantern Corps Vol. 3 #17–20, Green Lantern: New Guardians #17–20, Red Lanterns #17–20	February 19, 2014	978-1-4012-4409-5	
Green Lantern/New Gods: Godhead HC	424	Green Lantern/New Gods: Godhead #1, Green Lantern Vol. 5 #35–37, Green Lantern Corps Vol. 3 #35–37, Green Lantern: New Guardians #35–37, Red Lanterns #35–37, Sinestro #6–8, Green Lantern Annual Vol. 5 #3	September 9, 2015		
Green Lantern Corps Volume 1: Fearsome HC	160	Green Lantern Corps Vol. 3 #1–7	September 19, 2012	978-1-4012-3701-1	
Green Lantern Corps Volume 2: Alpha War HC	192	Green Lantern Corps Vol. 3 #0, 8–14	July 3, 2013	978-1-4012-4012-7	
Green Lantern Corps Volume 3: Willpower HC	256	Green Lantern Corps Vol. 3 #15–20, Green Lantern Corps Annual Vol. 3 #1	December 4, 2013	978-1-4012-4407-1	
Green Lantern Corps Volume 4: Rebuild TP	192	Green Lantern Corps Vol. 3 #21–27, Green Lantern Corps Annual Vol. 3 #2	July 2, 2014	978-1-4012-4745-4	
Green Lantern Corps Volume 5: Uprising TP	264	Green Lantern Corps Vol. 3 #28–34, Green Lantern Vol. 5 #31–33, Green Lantern Annual Vol. 5 #2	January 14, 2015		
Green Lantern Corps Volume 6: Reckoning TP	264	Green Lantern Corps Vol. 3 #35–40	July 15, 2015		
Green Lantern: New Guardians Volume 1: The Ring Bearer HC	160	Green Lantern: New Guardians #1–7	October 17, 2012	978-1-4012-3707-3	
Green Lantern: New Guardians Volume 2: Beyond Hope HC	144	Green Lantern: New Guardians #8–12, Blue Beetle Vol. 8 #9	July 31, 2013	978-1-4012-4077-6	
Green Lantern: New Guardians Volume 3: Love and Death HC	224	Green Lantern: New Guardians #0, 13–20	January 29, 2014	978-1-4012-4406-4	
Green Lantern: New Guardians Volume 4: Gods and Monsters TP	192	Green Lantern: New Guardians #21–27, Green Lantern Annual #2	August 27, 2014	978-1401247461	
Green Lantern: New Guardians Volume 5: Godkillers TP	200	Green Lantern: New Guardians #28–34	February 18, 2015	978-1401247461	
Green Lantern: New Guardians Volume 6: Storming The Gates TP	144	Green Lantern: New Guardians #35–40	August 19, 2015		
Grifter Volume 1: Most Wanted TP	192	Grifter Vol. 3 #1–8	July 25, 2012	978-1-4012-3497-3	
Grifter Volume 2: Newfound Power TP	208	Grifter Vol. 3 #0, 9–16	May 22, 2013	978-1-4012-4098-1	
Harley Quinn Volume 1: Hot in the City HC	208	Harley Quinn Vol. 2 #0–8	October 22, 2014		
Harley Quinn Volume 2: Power Outage HC	208	Harley Quinn Vol. 2 #9–13, Harley Quinn: Futures End #1, a story from Secret Origins Vol. 3 #4, Harley Quinn Invades Comic-Con International: San Diego #1	April 8, 2015		
Harley Quinn Volume 3: Kiss Kiss Bang Stab HC	200	Harley Quinn Vol. 2 #14–16, Harley Quinn Valentine's Day Special #1, Harley Quinn Holiday Special #1	December 9, 2015		
Harley Quinn by Amanda Conner & Jimmy Palmiotti Omnibus Vol. 1 HC	752	Harley Quinn Vol. 2 #0–16, Annual #1, Harley Quinn: Futures End #1, Harley Quinn Invades Comic-Con International: San Diego Special #1, Harley Quinn Holiday Special #1, Harley Quinn Valentine's Day Special #1, Harley Quinn and Power Girl #1-6 and a story from Secret Origins Vol. 3 #4	September 12, 2017	978-1-4012-7643-0	
Hawk and Dove Volume 1: First Strikes TP	192	Hawk & Dove Vol. 4 #1–8	August 15, 2012	978-1-4012-3498-0	
Huntress: Crossbow at the Crossroads TP	144	Huntress: Crossbow at the Crossroads Vol. 3 #1–6	October 30, 2012	978-1401237332	
I, Vampire Volume 1: Tainted Love TP	144	I, Vampire #1–6	October 3, 2012	978-1-4012-3687-8	
I, Vampire Volume 2: Rise of the Vampires TP	192	I, Vampire #7–12, Justice League Dark #7–8	March 13, 2013	978-1-4012-3783-7	
I, Vampire Volume 3: Wave of Mutilation TP	192	I, Vampire #0, 13–19	October 9, 2013	978-1-4012-4278-7	
Infinity Man and the Forever People Volume 1: Planet of the Humans TP	224	Infinity Man and the Forever People #1–9, Infinity Man and the Forever People: Futures End #1	June 24, 2015		
Justice League Volume 1: Origin HC	176	Justice League Vol. 2 #1–6	May 2, 2012	978-1-4012-3461-4	
Justice League Volume 2: The Villain's Journey HC	176	Justice League Vol. 2 #7–12	January 30, 2013	978-1-4012-3764-6	
Justice League Volume 3: Throne of Atlantis HC	192	Justice League Vol. 2 #13–17, Aquaman Vol. 7 #15–16	September 25, 2013	978-1-4012-4240-4	
Justice League Volume 4: The Grid HC	176	Justice League Vol. 2 #18–20, 22–23	April 2, 2014	978-1-4012-4717-1	
Justice League Volume 5: Forever Heroes HC	168	Justice League Vol. 2 #24–29	September 10, 2014		
Justice League Volume 6: Injustice League HC	256	Justice League Vol. 2 #30–39	July 8, 2015		
Justice League: Trinity War HC	360	Justice League Vol. 2 #22–23, Justice League of America Vol. 3 #6–7, Justice League Dark #22–23, Consantine #5, Trinity of Sin: Pandora #1–3, Trinity of Sin: The Phantom Stranger Vol. 4 #11	March 12, 2014	978-1-4012-4519-1	
Justice League 3000 Volume 1: Yesterday Lives TP	176	Justice League 3000 #1–7	October 15, 2014		
Justice League 3000 Volume 2: The Camelot War TP	144	Justice League 3000 #8–13	April 22, 2015		
Justice League Dark Volume 1: In The Dark TP	144	Justice League Dark #1–6	October 10, 2012	978-1-4012-3704-2	
Justice League Dark Volume 2: The Books of Magic TP	224	Justice League Dark #0, 7–13, Justice League Dark Annual#1	July 10, 2013	978-1-4012-4024-0	
Justice League Dark Volume 3: The Death of Magic TP	144	Justice League Dark #14–21	January 29, 2014	978-1-4012-4245-9	
Justice League Dark Volume 4: The Rebirth of Evil TP	208	Justice League Dark #22–29	August 20, 2014	978-1401247256	
Justice League Dark Volume 5: Paradise Lost TP	160	Justice League Dark #30–34, Justice League Dark: Futures End #1	February 25, 2015		
Justice League Dark Volume 6: Lost in Forever TP	176	Justice League Dark #35–40, Justice League Dark Annual #2	August 26, 2015		
Justice League International Volume 1: The Signal Masters TP	144	Justice League International Vol. 3 #1–6	May 9, 2012	978-1-4012-3534-5	
Justice League International Volume 2: Breakdown TP	208	Justice League International Vol. 3 #7–12, Justice League International Annual Vol. 3 #1, The Fury of Firestorm: The Nuclear Men #9	January 2, 2013	978-1-4012-3793-6	
Justice League of America Volume 1: World's Most Dangerous HC	224	Justice League of America Vol. 3 #1–7	November 6, 2013	978-1-4012-4236-7	
Justice League of America Volume 2: Survivors of Evil HC	192	Justice League of America Vol. 3 #8–14	September 10, 2014	978-1401247263	
Justice League of America's Vibe Volume 1: Breach TP	232	Justice League of America's Vibe #1–10	July 24, 2014	978-1-4012-4331-9	
Justice League United Volume 1: Justice League Canada HC	192	Justice League United #0–5	March 4, 2015		
Justice League United Volume 2: The Infinitus Saga HC	224	Justice League United #6–10, Justice League United Annual #1, Justice League: Futures End #1, Justice League United: Futures End #1	December 16, 2015		
Katana Volume 1: Soultaker TP	256	Katana #1–10, Justice League Dark #23.1	August 20, 2014	978-1-4012-4411-8	
Klarion Volume 1: The New Witch in Town TP	144	Klarion #1–6	July 29, 2015		
Larfleeze Volume 1: Revolt of the Orange Lanterns TP	176	Larfleeze #1–5, stories from Threshold #1–6	June 18, 2014	978-1-4012-4521-4	
Larfleeze Volume 2: The Face of Greed TP	144	Larfleeze #6–12	December 24, 2014		
Legion Lost Volume 1: Run From Tomorrow TP	168	Legion Lost Vol. 2 #1–7	September 19, 2012	978-1-4012-3703-5	
Legion Lost Volume 2: The Culling TP	224	Legion Lost Vol. 2 #0, 8–16	August 28, 2013	978-1-4012-4025-7	
Legion of Super-Heroes Volume 1: Hostile World TP	160	Legion of Super-Heroes Vol. 7 #1–7	June 27, 2012	978-1-4012-3501-7	
Legion of Super-Heroes Volume 2: The Dominators TP	192	Legion of Super-Heroes Vol. 7 #0, 8–14	May 8, 2013	978-1-4012-4097-4	
Legion of Super-Heroes Volume 3: The Fatal Five TP	208	Legion of Super-Heroes Vol. 7 #15–23	February 12, 2014	978-1-4012-4332-6	
Lobo Volume 1: Targets TP	144	Lobo #1–6	August 12, 2015		
Men of War Volume 1: Uneasy Company TP	256	Men of War Vol. 2 #1–8	July 18, 2012	978-1-4012-3499-7	
Mister Terrific Volume 1: Mind Games TP	192	Mister Terrific #1–8	June 13, 2012	978-1-4012-3500-0	
New Suicide Squad Volume 1: Pure Insanity TP	192	New Suicide Squad #1–8	July 15, 2015		
Nightwing Volume 1: Traps and Trapezes TP	160	Nightwing Vol. 3 #1–7	October 10, 2012	978-1-4012-3705-9	
Nightwing Volume 2: Night of the Owls TP	144	Nightwing Vol. 3 #0, 8–12	July 24, 2013	978-1401240271	
Nightwing Volume 3: Death of the Family TP	176	Nightwing Vol. 3 #13–18, Batman Vol. 2 #17	December 4, 2013	978-1401244132	
Nightwing Volume 4: Second City TP	144	Nightwing Vol. 3 #19–24	July 9, 2014	978-1401246303	
Nightwing Volume 5: Setting Son TP	200	Nightwing Vol. 3 #25–30, Nightwing Annual Vol. 3 #1	December 10, 2014		
O.M.A.C. Volume 1: Omactivate TP	192	O.M.A.C. #1–8	August 8, 2012	978-1-4012-3482-9	
Penguin: Pain and Prejudice TP	144	Penguin: Pain and Prejudice #1–5	September 25, 2012	978-1401237325	
Red Hood and the Outlaws Volume 1: Redemption TP	160	Red Hood and the Outlaws #1–7	November 7, 2012	978-1-4012-3712-7	
Red Hood and the Outlaws Volume 2: The Starfire TP	160	Red Hood and the Outlaws #8–14	June 26, 2013	978-1401240905	
Red Hood and the Outlaws Volume 3: Death of the Family TP	160	Red Hood and the Outlaws #0, 15–18, Teen Titans Vol. 4 #15–16	November 27, 2013	978-1401244125	
Red Hood and the Outlaws Volume 4: League of Assassins TP	176	Red Hood and the Outlaws #19–24, Red Hood and the Outlaws Annual #1	June 11, 2014	978-1401246365	
Red Hood and the Outlaws Volume 5: The Big Picture TP	160	Red Hood and the Outlaws #27–31, DC Universe Presents #17–18	December 10, 2014		
Red Hood and the Outlaws Volume 6: Lost and Found TP	144	Red Hood and the Outlaws #32–34, stories from Secret Origins Vol. 3 #2 and #5, Red Hood and the Outlaws Annual #2	June 17, 2015		
Red Hood and the Outlaws Volume 7: Last Call TP	144	Red Hood and the Outlaws #35–40, Red Hood and the Outlaws Futures End #1	January 6, 2016		
Red Lanterns Volume 1: Blood and Rage TP	160	Red Lanterns #1–7	June 6, 2012	978-1-4012-3491-1	
Red Lanterns Volume 2: The Death of the Red Lanterns TP	144	Red Lanterns #8–12, Stormwatch Vol. 3 #9	March 6, 2013	978-1-4012-3847-6	
Red Lanterns Volume 3: The Second Prophecy TP	224	Red Lanterns #0, 13–20	November 13, 2013	978-1401244149	
Red Lanterns Volume 4: Blood Brothers TP	176	Red Lanterns #21–26, Green Lantern Annual Vol. 5 #2	May 28, 2014	978-1401247423	
Red Lanterns Volume 5: Atrocities TP	272	Red Lanterns #27–34, Red Lanterns Annual #1, Supergirl Vol. 6 #31	December 3, 2014		
Red Lanterns Volume 6: Forged in Blood TP	160	Red Lanterns #35–40, Red Lanterns: Futures End #1	July 29, 2015		
Resurrection Man Volume 1: Dead Again TP	160	Resurrection Man Vol. 2 #1–7	August 29, 2012	978-1-4012-3529-1	
Resurrection Man Volume 2: A Matter of Death and Life TP	144	Resurrection Man Vol. 2 #0, 8–12, Suicide Squad Vol. 4 #9	June 12, 2013	978-1401238667	
Secret Origins Volume 1 TP	160	Secret Origins Vol. 3 #1–4	February 11, 2015		
Secret Origins Volume 2 TP	272	Secret Origins Vol. 3 #5–11	August 12, 2015		
Shazam! Volume 1 HC	192	Stories from Justice League Vol. 2 #0, 7–11, 14–16, 18–21	September 25, 2013	978-1401242442	
Sinestro Volume 1: The Demon Within TP	160	Sinestro #1–5, Sinestro: Futures End #1, Green Lantern Vol. 5 #23.4	January 7, 2015		
Sinestro Volume 2: Sacrifice TP	192	Sinestro #6–11, Sinestro Annual #1, a story from Secret Origins Vol. 3 #6	July 22, 2015		
Static Shock Volume 1: Supercharged TP	192	Static Shock #1–8	June 20, 2012	978-1-4012-3484-3	
Stormwatch Volume 1: The Dark Side TP	144	Stormwatch Vol. 3 #1–6	May 23, 2012	978-1-4012-3483-6	
Stormwatch Volume 2: Enemies of Earth TP	160	Stormwatch Vol. 3 #7–12, Red Lanterns #10	February 13, 2013	978-1-4012-3848-3	
Stormwatch Volume 3: Betrayal TP	176	Stormwatch Vol. 3 #0, 13–18	September 18, 2013	978-1401243159	
Stormwatch Volume 4: Reset TP	272	Stormwatch Vol. 3 #19–30	June 4, 2014	978-1401248413	
Suicide Squad Volume 1: Kicked in the Teeth TP	160	Suicide Squad Vol. 4 #1–7	July 4, 2012	978-1-4012-3544-4	
Suicide Squad Volume 2: Basilisk Rising TP	192	Suicide Squad Vol. 4 #0, 8–13, Resurrection Man Vol. 2 #9	February 13, 2013	978-1401238445	
Suicide Squad Volume 3: Death is for Suckers TP	144	Suicide Squad Vol. 4 #14–19	October 23, 2013	978-1401243166	
Suicide Squad Volume 4: Discipline and Punish TP	144	Suicide Squad Vol. 4 #20–23, Justice League of America Vol. 3 #7.1, Detective Comics Vol. 2 #23.2	April 30, 2014	978-1401247010	
Suicide Squad Volume 5: Walled In TP	208	Suicide Squad Vol. 4 #24–30, Suicide Squad: Amanda Waller #1	October 22, 2014		
Superboy Volume 1: Incubation TP	160	Superboy Vol. 5 #1–7	August 1, 2012	978-1-4012-3485-0	
Superboy Volume 2: Extraction TP	160	Superboy Vol. 5 #0, 8–12, Teen Titans Vol. 4 #10	May 29, 2013	978-1401240493	
Superboy Volume 3: Lost TP	200	Superboy Vol. 5 #13–19, Superboy Annual Vol. 5 #1	December 31, 2013	978-1401243173	
Superboy Volume 4: Blood and Steel TP	160	Superboy Vol. 5 #20–25	July 2, 2014	978-1401246853	
Superboy Volume 5: Paradox TP	232	Superboy Vol. 5 #26–34, Superboy: Futures End #1	January 7, 2015		
Supergirl Volume 1: Last Daughter of Krypton TP	160	Supergirl Vol. 6 #1–7	October 17, 2012	978-1-4012-3680-9	
Supergirl Volume 2: Girl in the World TP	144	Supergirl Vol. 6 #0, 8–12	July 10, 2013	978-1401240875	
Supergirl Volume 3: Sanctuary TP	192	Supergirl Vol. 6 #13–19	February 12, 2014	978-1401243180	
Supergirl Volume 4: Out of the Past TP	144	Supergirl Vol. 6 #21–25, Action Comics Vol. 2 #23.1, Superman Vol. 3 #25	July 16, 2014	978-1401247003	
Supergirl Volume 5: Red Daughter of Krypton TP	256	Supergirl Vol. 6 #26–33, Green Lantern Vol. 5 #28, Red Lanterns #28–29	January 14, 2015		
Supergirl Volume 6: Crucible TP	192	Supergirl Vol. 6 #34–40, Supergirl: Futures End #1	July 15, 2015		
Superman: Action Comics Volume 1: Superman and the Men of Steel HC	256	Action Comics Vol. 2 #1–8	August 1, 2012	978-1-4012-3546-8	
Superman: Action Comics Volume 2: Bulletproof HC	224	Action Comics Vol. 2 #0, 9–12, Action Comics Annual Vol. 2 #1	May 1, 2013	978-1401241018	
Superman: Action Comics Volume 3: At the End of Days HC	224	Action Comics Vol. 2 #13–18	December 11, 2013	978-1401242329	
Superman: Action Comics Volume 4: Hybrid HC	200	Action Comics Vol. 2 #19–24, stories from Young Romance: A New 52 Valentine's Day Special #1 and Superman Annual Vol. 3 #2	July 23, 2014	978-1401246327	
Superman: Action Comics Volume 5: What Lies Beneath HC	160	Action Comics Vol. 2 #25–29, stories from Secret Origins Vol. 3 #1	December 31, 2014		
Superman: Action Comics Volume 6: Superdoom HC	200	Action Comics Vol. 2 #30–35, Action Comics Annual Vol. 2 #3	June 10, 2015		
Superman: Action Comics Volume 7: Under the Skin HC	160	Action Comics Vol. 2 #36–40, Action Comics: Futures End #1	December 23, 2015		
Superman: Doomed HC	544	Superman: Doomed #1–2, Action Comics Vol. 2 #30–35, Superman/Wonder Woman #7–12, Superman Vol. 3 #30, Action Comics Annual Vol. 2 #3, Superman/Wonder Woman Annual #1, Supergirl Vol. 6 #34–35, Batman/Superman #11	March 25, 2015		
Superman: H'el on Earth HC	296	Superman Vol. 3 #13–17, Superboy Vol. 5 #14–17, Supergirl Vol. 6 #14–17	November 27, 2013	978-1401243197	
Superman: Krypton Returns HC	208	Superboy Vol. 5 #0, 25, Supergirl Vol. 6 #0, 25, Superman Vol. 3 #0, 25, 23.3, Action Comics Annual Vol. 2 #2	February 11, 2015		
Superman Volume 1: What Price Tomorrow? HC	144	Superman Vol. 3 #1–6	November 14, 2012	978-1-4012-3468-3	
Superman Volume 2: Secrets and Lies HC	208	Superman Vol. 3 #7–12, Superman Annual Vol. 3 #1	June 26, 2013	978-1401240288	
Superman Volume 3: Fury At World's End HC	192	Superman Vol. 3 #0, 13–17	January 8, 2014	978-1401243203	
Superman Volume 4: Psi War HC	208	Superman Vol. 3 #18–24, Superman Annual Vol. 3 #2	August 6, 2014	978-1401246235	
Superman Volume 5: Under Fire HC	168	Superman Vol. 3 #25–31	February 4, 2015		
Superman Volume 6: The Men of Tomorrow HC	256	Superman Vol. 3 #32–39	August 5, 2015		
Superman Unchained Volume 1 HC	240	Superman Unchained #1–7	August 2014	978-1401245221	
Superman Unchained Deluxe Edition HC	304	Superman Unchained #1–9	December 3, 2014		
Superman/Wonder Woman Volume 1: Power Couple HC	176	Superman/Wonder Woman #1–6	September 17, 2014		
Superman/Wonder Woman Volume 2: War and Peace HC	284	Superman/Wonder Woman #8–12, Superman/Wonder Woman Annual #1, Superman/Wonder Woman: Futures End #1, Wonder Woman: Futures End #1	March 18, 2015		
Superman/Wonder Woman Volume 3: Casualties of War HC	144	Superman/Wonder Woman #13–17	November 18, 2015		
Swamp Thing by Scott Snyder Deluxe Edition HC	512	Swamp Thing Vol. 5 #0–18, Swamp Thing Annual Vol. 5 #1, Animal Man Vol. 2 #12, 17	September 16, 2015		
Swamp Thing Volume 1: Raise Them Bones TP	160	Swamp Thing Vol. 5 #1–7	August 22, 2012	978-1-4012-3462-1	
Swamp Thing Volume 2: Family Tree TP	144	Swamp Thing Vol. 5 #0, 8–11, Swamp Thing Annual Vol. 5 #1	April 10, 2013	978-1-4012-3843-8	
Swamp Thing Volume 3: Rotworld: The Green Kingdom TP	208	Swamp Thing Vol. 5 #12–18, Animal Man Vol. 2 #12, 17	November 13, 2013	978-1401242640	
Swamp Thing Volume 4: Seeder TP	144	Swamp Thing Vol. 5 #19–23, 23.1	June 4, 2014	978-1401246396	
Swamp Thing Volume 5: Killing Field TP	136	Swamp Thing Vol. 5 #24–27, Swamp Thing Annual Vol. 5 #2	December 17, 2014		
Swamp Thing Volume 6: The Sureen TP	176	Swamp Thing Vol. 5 #28–34, pages from Aquaman Vol. 7 #31	June 3, 2015		
Swamp Thing Volume 7: Season's End TP	200	Swamp Thing Vol. 5 #35–40, Swamp Thing Annual Vol. 5 #3, Swamp Thing Futures End #1	January 27, 2016		
Sword of Sorcery Volume 1: Amethyst TP	144	Sword of Sorcery Vol. 2 #0–8	August 28, 2013	978-1401241001	
Talon Volume 1: Scourge of the Owls TP	192	Talon #0–7	August 28, 2013	978-1401238872	
Talon Volume 2: Fall of the Owls TP	240	Talon #8–17, Birds of Prey Vol. 3 #21	July 9, 2014	978-1401246259	
Team 7 Volume 1: Fight Fire With Fire TP	192	Team 7 Vol. 2 #0–8	July 3, 2013	978-1401240929	
Teen Titans Volume 1: It's Our Right to Fight TP	168	Teen Titans Vol. 4 #1–7	September 5, 2012	978-1-4012-3698-4	
Teen Titans Volume 1: Blinded by the Light TP	176	Teen Titans Vol. 5 #1–7	August 5, 2015		
Teen Titans Volume 2: The Culling TP	192	Teen Titans Vol. 4 #8–14, DC Universe Presents #12	June 19, 2013	978-1-4012-4103-2	
Teen Titans Volume 3: Death of the Family TP	160	Teen Titans Vol. 4 #0, 15–17, Batman Vol. 2 #17, Red Hood and the Outlaws #16	December 18, 2013	978-1401243210	
Teen Titans Volume 4: Light and Dark TP	144	Teen Titans Vol. 4 #18–23	July 16, 2014	978-1401246242	
Teen Titans Volume 5: The Trial of Kid Flash TP	256	Teen Titans Vol. 4 #24–30, Teen Titans Annual Vol. 4 #2	February 4, 2015		
The Culling: Rise of the Ravagers TP	176	Legion Lost Vol. 2 #8–9, Superboy Vol. 5 #8–9, Teen Titans Vol.4 #8–9, Teen Titans Annual Vol. 4 #1	January 23, 2013	978-1-4012-3799-8	
The Flash by Francis Manapul and Brian Buccellato Omnibus HC	704	The Flash Vol. 4 #0–25, 23.2	November 16, 2016		
The Flash Volume 1: Move Forward HC	192	The Flash Vol. 4 #1–8	November 7, 2012	978-1-4012-3553-6	
The Flash Volume 2: Rogues Revolution HC	160	The Flash Vol. 4 #0, 9–12, The Flash Annual Vol. 4 #1	August 14, 2013	978-1-4012-4031-8	
The Flash Volume 3: Gorilla Warfare HC	176	The Flash Vol. 4 #13–19	February 12, 2014	978-1-4012-4274-9	
The Flash Volume 4: Reverse HC	176	The Flash Vol. 4 #20–25, 23.2	August 13, 2014	978-1401247133	
The Flash Volume 5: History Lessons HC	144	The Flash Vol. 4 #26–29, The Flash Annual Vol. 4 #2	January 28, 2015		
The Flash Volume 6: Out of Time HC	208	The Flash Vol. 4 #30–35, The Flash Annual Vol. 4 #3, The Flash: Futures End #1	June 17, 2015		
The Flash Volume 7: Savage World HC	144	The Flash Vol. 4 #36–40, a story from Secret Origins Vol. 3 #7	January 13, 2016		
The Fury of Firestorm: The Nuclear Men Volume 1: The God Particle TP	144	The Fury of Firestorm: The Nuclear Men #1–6	September 12, 2012	978-1-4012-3700-4	
The Fury of Firestorm: The Nuclear Men Volume 2: The Firestorm Protocols TP	160	The Fury of Firestorm: The Nuclear Men #0, 7–12	June 19, 2013	978-1-4012-4032-5	
The Fury of Firestorm: The Nuclear Man Volume 3: Takeover TP	176	The Fury of Firestorm: The Nuclear Man #13–20	December 18, 2013	978-1-4012-4292-3	
The Green Team: Teen Trillionaires Volume 1: Money and Power TP	192	The Green Team: Teen Trillionaires #1–8	April 16, 2014	978-1401246419	
The Joker: Death of the Family HC	456	Batman Vol. 2 #17, Catwoman Vol. 4 #13–14, Batgirl Vol. 4 #14–16, Batman and Robin Vol. 2 #15–17, Nightwing Vol. 3 #15–16, Detective Comics Vol. 2 #16–17, Red Hood and the Outlaws #15–16, and Teen Titans Vol. 4 #15 plus pages from Batman Vol. 2 #13, Batgirl Vol. 4 #13, Nightwing Vol. 3 #14, Red Hood and the Outlaws #13–14, Suicide Squad Vol. 4 #14–15, and Teen Titans Vol. 4 #14, 16	October 16, 2013	978-1-4012-4235-0	
The Joker: Endgame HC	176	Batman Vol. 2 #35–39, Batman Annual Vol. 2 #3, Gotham Academy: Endgame #1, Batgirl: Endgame #1, Detective Comics: Endgame #1, Arkham Manor: Endgame #1	September 23, 2015		
The Movement Volume 1: Class Warfare TP	144	The Movement #1–8	May 21, 2014	978-1401246402	
The Movement Volume 2: Fighting for the Future TP	144	The Movement #9–12	December 3, 2014		
The Multiversity Deluxe Edition HC	448	All issues of The Multiversity	October 21, 2015		
The New 52: Futures End Volume 1 TP	416	The New 52: Futures End #0–17	December 3, 2014		
The New 52: Futures End Volume 2 TP	304	The New 52: Futures End #18–30	July 15, 2015		
The New 52: Futures End Volume 3 TP	408	The New 52: Futures End # 31–48	September 9, 2015		
The Ravagers Volume 1: The Kids from N.O.W.H.E.R.E. TP	192	The Ravagers #1–7	May 8, 2013	978-1401240912	
The Ravagers Volume 2: Heavenly Destruction TP	144	The Ravagers #0, 8–12	February 5, 2014	978-1401243135	
The Savage Hawkman Volume 1: Darkness Rising TP	192	The Savage Hawkman #1–8	October 24, 2012	978-1-4012-3706-6	
The Savage Hawkman Volume 2: Wanted TP	288	The Savage Hawkman #0, 9–20	December 4, 2013	978-1401240844	
Threshold Volume 1: The Hunted TP	304	Threshold #1–8, Green Lantern: New Guardians Annual #1	February 26, 2014	978-1-4012-4333-3	
Trinity of Sin Volume 1: The Wages of Sin TP	144	Trinity of Sin #1–6	July 22, 2015		
Trinity of Sin: Pandora Volume 1: The Curse TP	144	Trinity of Sin: Pandora #1–5, back ups from Justice League Vol. 2 #0 and #6, and Free Comic Book Day 2012	March 25, 2014	978-1-4012-4524-5	
Trinity of Sin: Pandora Volume 2: Choices TP	200	Trinity of Sin: Pandora #6–14	October 22, 2014		
Trinity of Sin: The Phantom Stranger Volume 1: A Stranger Among Us TP	144	The Phantom Stranger Vol. 4 #0–5	May 29, 2013	978-1401240882	
Trinity of Sin: The Phantom Stranger Volume 2: Breach of Faith TP	144	The Phantom Stranger/Trinity of Sin: The Phantom Stranger Vol. 4 #6–11	March 5, 2014	978-1401247140	
Trinity of Sin: The Phantom Stranger Volume 3: The Crack in Creation TP	264	Trinity of Sin: The Phantom Stranger Vol. 4 #12–22, Trinity of Sin: The Phantom Stranger: Futures End #1	January 14, 2015		
Voodoo Volume 1: What Lies Beneath TP	144	Voodoo Vol. 2 #1–6	September 26, 2012	978-1-4012-3561-1	
Voodoo Volume 2: The Killer in Me TP	160	Voodoo Vol. 2 #0, 7–12	February 20, 2013	978-1-4012-3815-5	
Wonder Woman Volume 1: Blood HC	160	Wonder Woman Vol. 4 #1–6	May 30, 2012	978-1-4012-3563-5	
Wonder Woman Volume 2: Guts HC	144	Wonder Woman Vol. 4 #7–12	January 9, 2013	978-1-4012-3809-4	
Wonder Woman Volume 3: Iron HC	176	Wonder Woman Vol. 4 #0, 13–18	September 11, 2013	978-1401246075	
Wonder Woman Volume 4: War HC	144	Wonder Woman Vol. 4 #19–23	March 12, 2014	978-1401246082	
Wonder Woman Volume 5: Flesh HC	176	Wonder Woman Vol. 4 #24–29, 23.2	October 1, 2014		
Wonder Woman Volume 6: Bones HC	160	Wonder Woman Vol. 4 #30–35, a story from Secret Origins Vol. 3 #6	April 1, 2015		
Wonder Woman Volume 7: War Torn HC	160	Wonder Woman Vol. 4 #36–40, Wonder Woman Annual Vol. 4 #1	September 2, 2015		
Wonder Woman by Brian Azzarello & Cliff Chiang Omnibus HC	928	Wonder Woman Vol. 4 #0-35, #23.1 a story from Secret Origins Vol. 3 #6	May 21, 2019	978-1-4012-9109-9	
Worlds' Finest Volume 1: Lost Daughters of Earth 2 TP	144	Worlds' Finest #0–5	April 10, 2013	978-1-4012-3834-6	
Worlds' Finest Volume 2: Hunt and Be Hunted TP	160	Worlds' Finest #6–12	November 20, 2013	978-1401242763	
Worlds' Finest Volume 3: Control Issues TP	144	Worlds' Finest #13–18	June 11, 2014	978-1401246167	
Worlds' Finest Volume 4: First Contact TP	192	Worlds' Finest #19–21, Worlds' Finest Annual #1 Batman/Superman #8–9	December 10, 2014		
Worlds' Finest Volume 5: Homeward Bound TP	192	Worlds' Finest #22–26, Worlds' Finest: Futures End #1	June 3, 2015		
Worlds' Finest Volume 6: The Secret History of Superman and Batman TP	144	Worlds' Finest #27–32	December 2, 2015		
