= DC Universe Presents =

Superman Legends #1, published by Titan Magazines.

DC Universe Presents is the name of two DC Comics publications. The first was part of the UK 'Collector's Edition' line of DC Comics published by Titan Magazines. Beginning March 2007, it was originally titled Superman Legends and was published alongside Batman Legends. Titan also later released several other DC comics following on from the success of Superman and Batman Legends. The book was retitled as DC Universe Presents at issue 33 but continued the issue count of Superman Legends, despite the change in title and in some of its content. The title reprinted DC Comics from the United States including Justice League, Superman and Green Lantern and was edited by Mark McKenzie-Ray.

The second was a US title published as part of DC Comic's The New 52. The premise of the book was similar to that of DC's original Showcase and DC Comics Presents series. It would introduce characters and concepts into the rebooted universe. The final issue of this series, #19, was published in April 2013.

== Titan Magazine ==
=== Contents of Superman Legends ===
Stories printed in Superman Legends included:

- Issues 1-12: Superman: For Tomorrow
- Issues 1–3, 5-9: All-Star Superman
- Issues 1-2: The last two issues of Superman/Batman: Public Enemies
- Issues 3–7, 10-11: "Camelot Falls" from Action Comics
- Issue 4: Justice League of America #0
- Issue 8-11: Superman Confidential
- Issue 13+: various comics from Action Comics including "Last Son" and "Bizarro World"
- Issue 14+: Justice

=== Change to DC Universe Presents ===
Superman Legends became DC Universe Presents after issue #33. It continued the stories and issue count of Superman Legends while adding stories featuring other characters such as Green Lantern and Flash. Issue #40 featured no Superman content because of a focus on Green Lantern due to the release of the Green Lantern film. Issue #43 marked the first time that The New 52 comic strips were published in the UK. It featured the first issues of the new Justice League, Action Comics and Green Lantern comics. According to the response to a fan letter, these stories were then due to continue being printed in DC Universe Presents for the foreseeable future, although Action Comics and Green Lantern were later dropped in favour of Justice League Dark and Justice League of America.

Titan published a new comic, simply titled Superman, launched on 30 May 2013. This series lasted only six issues before being replaced with Batman/Superman. Titan also published a Superman Annual in August the same year.

=== Volume Two (Justice League Trinity) ===
The comic was relaunched in 2014 as DC Universe Presents Justice League Trinity, a change which marked the beginning of a new volume for the title. Now published bi-monthly, the page count was increased to 100 pages to accommodate the four to five stories printed per issue. Forever Evil and Justice League United were amongst the stories printed in the new format.

US comics reprinted during Volume 2 included:

- Issue 4: Forever Evil #1-2, Justice League #24, Justice League of America #8
- Issue 10: Justice League #32, Justice League United #2, Justice League Dark #35, The Flash #4
- Issue 11: Justice League #33, Justice League United #3, Justice League Dark #36, The Flash #5
- Issue 12: Justice League #34, Justice League United #4, Justice League Dark #47, Wonder Woman #1

=== Cancellation ===
Titan ceased publication of all their DC Comics titles, including DC Universe Presents, in December 2018.

== The New 52 ==
DC Universe Presents

Publication information
- Publisher: DC Comics
- Schedule: Monthly
- Format: Ongoing series
- Genre: Superhero
- Publication date: November 2011–June 2013
- No. of issues: 19 and issue numbered 0
- Main character: Various

This series presented multi-issue and single-issue stories about different DC characters, each by a different creative team. It was published in the First Wave of new comics that DC released under The New 52 banner after Flashpoint. The series ended with the 19th issue.

- Issues 1-5: Deadman
  - Writer: Paul Jenkins
  - Artist: Bernard Chang
- Issues 6-8: Challengers of the Unknown
  - Writer: Dan DiDio
  - Artist: Jerry Ordway
- Issues 9-11: Vandal Savage
  - Writer: James Robinson
  - Artist: Bernard Chang
- Issue 12: Kid Flash
  - Writer: Fabian Nicieza
  - Artist: Jorge Jimenez
- Issue 0: OMAC, Mister Terrific, Hawk and Dove, Blackhawks, Deadman: This issue featured characters from titles cancelled when the Second Wave of The New 52 was announced.
  - Writers: Dan DiDio, Rob Liefeld, Tony Bedard, James Robinson
  - Artists: Various
- Issues 13-16: Black Lightning and Blue Devil
  - Writer: Marc Andreyko
  - Artist: Robson Rocha
- Issue 17: Arsenal
  - Writer: Joe Keatinge
  - Artist: Ricken
- Issue 18: Starfire
  - Writer: Joe Keatinge
  - Artist: Federico Dallocchio
- Issue 19: Beowulf
  - Writer: Tony Bedard
  - Artist: Jesus Saiz

== See also ==
- Batman Legends
- Justice League Legends
- DC Universe Presents Batman Superman
