= Justice League Legends =

Justice League Legends was part of the UK 'Collector Edition' line of DC Comics reprints published by Titan Magazines beginning June 2007. It reprinted Justice League of America related comics from DC Comics from the United States.

Justice League Legends accompanied Batman Legends and Superman Legends as the third DC Collector's Edition published for the UK, and follows from the Marvel Collector's Editions published by Panini Comics.

It was cancelled with issue 10, though the story Justice will be continued in Superman Legends.

Each issue was 76 pages long, similar to the Panini Comics Collectors' Editions. It reprinted modern (less than 2 years old) stories and was sold once every 28 days through newsagents.

== Material printed ==
- Issue 1-10: Justice League of America: Tornado's Path
- Issue 1-10: Justice
- Issue 2-7: Green Lantern
- Issue 8-10: Justice Society of America: The Lightning saga
