= Batman Legends =

US comic book series

Batman Legends volume 2, #1

Batman Legends (retitled to simply Batman for its third and fourth volumes) was a monthly anthology comic book series published in the UK by Titan Magazines as part of their DC Comics 'Collector's' Edition' range. Initially published by Panini Comics for 41 issues between October 2003 and November 2006, Titan subsequently took over publication with the launch of the comic's second volume. The title reprinted Batman-related comics originally published by DC Comics in the United States, typically including three stories per issue in a serialised format.

Batman Legends was the first DC Collector's Edition published for the UK and followed Panini's successful Marvel Collector's Editions. Titan followed their own success with several other DC titles, including Superman Legends, Justice League Legends, DC Universe Presents Batman Superman, Batman: The Dark Knight, Arrow, DC Super Heroes: The Flash, DC Comics Showcase: Supergirl and DC Legends: Wonder Woman. Titan also published a Batman Annual in August 2013.

Titan ceased publication of all their DC Comics titles in December 2018, ending a fifteen-year run for 'Batman'.

== Volume One ==
The first volume reprinted numerous recent and classic Batman story arcs. The key storylines serialised were as follows:

- Issues 1-12: "Hush"
- Issues 13-18: "Broken City"
- Issues 19-23: "As The Crow Flies"
- Issues 22-25: Batman: Year One
- Issues 24-38: "War Games"
- Issues 26-31: "Death In The Family"
- Issues 36-40: Superman/Batman: Supergirl
- Issues 38-41: "Under The Hood"

It also contained numerous creator profiles, competitions and a review of Batman Begins.

== Volume Two ==
Volume Two was published by Titan Magazines and was edited initially by Rona Simpson, later by Ned Hartley. Along with the customary three strips per issue, Batman Legends included a fan letters page, along with a feature on Batman-related merchandise titled 'Inside the Batcave'. As with each of Titan's DC titles during this time, each issue also included the 'Roll Call' feature which spotlighted various DC graphic novels and included a 'Hero of the Month' panel.

Volume two reprinted the following material as well as several miscellaneous issues from various Batman comics:

- Issues 1-4, 15+: All Star Batman and Robin
- Issues 1-4: Superman/Batman: Public Enemies
- Issues 1-4: Batman and Son
- Issues 5-10: "Rules Of Engagement" from Batman Confidential
- Issues 5+: Paul Dini's run on Detective Comics from #821
- Issues 7-11 Superman/Batman: Absolute Power
- Issues 11-14: "The Black Casebook"
- Issues 12-17: "Lovers and Madmen" from Batman Confidential
- Issues 17-21: "The Resurrection of Ra's Al Ghul" (Detective Comics), Batman, Nightwing and Robin
- Issues 22-23: "Images"
- Issues 24-25: "Trust" (Detective Comics)
- Issue 25: "The Fiend with Nine Eyes"
- Issues 26+: Batman: R.I.P
- Issues 48-51: Batman and Robin Must Die, Batman #700
- Issues 52-57: Batman Inc., Batwoman: Hydrology
- Issues 53-57: Batman Volume 2

== Volume Three ==
Batman vol. 3, issue #1 and Batman: The Dark Knight issue #1.

Volume two ended after 57 issues in June 2012 and was retitled to simply 'Batman' for volume three. Now edited by Andrew James, the first issue of the new format was released on 5 July, the same day as the first issue of Titan's new secondary Batman title, Batman: The Dark Knight. The title began printing the New 52 Batman and Robin series whilst also continuing to reprint ongoing pre-New 52 storylines. It later showcased strips from Nightwing and Batman Eternal, as well as other Batman-related spin-off series. Some longer US issues such as annuals and those with 'back-up' strips were published across several issues by Titan due to page count restrictions. Titan celebrated fifty issues of Volume 3 in April 2016.

Volume 3 reprinted the following US issues:

- Issue 1: Batman #7, Batman and Robin #1 and #2
- Issue 2: Batman #8, Batman and Robin #3 and #4
- Issue 3: Batman #8 back up, Batman #9, Batman and Robin #5
- Issue 4: Batman #10 and 11, Batman and Robin #6,
- Issue 5: Batman #10 and 11 backs ups, Batman #12, Batman and Robin #7
- Issue 6: Batman Annual #1, Batman and Robin #8
- Issue 7: Batman #0, Batman and Robin #0, Batman: The Dark Knight #0
- Issue 8: Batman #13 and #14, Batman Incorporated #1
- Issue 9: Batman #13, 14 and 15 back ups, Batman Incorporated #2 and 0
- Issue 10: Batman #15, Batman Incorporated #3 and 4
- Issue 11: Batman #16, Batman Incorporated #5 and 6
- Issue 12: Batman #17, Batman and Robin Annual #1
- Issue 13: Batman #18, Batman Incorporated #7 and 8
- Issue 14: Batman and Robin #18 and 19, Batman Incorporated #9
- Issue 43: Batman #42, Robin: Son of Batman #2, Batman Eternal #17
- Issue 44: Batman #43, Robin: Son of Batman #3, Batman Eternal #18 and 19
- Issue 45: Batman #44, Robin: Son of Batman #4, Batman Eternal #20
- Issue 46: Batman #45, Robin: Son of Batman #5, Batman Eternal #21
- Issue 47: Batman #46, Robin: Son of Batman #6, Batman Eternal #22
- Issue 48: Batman #47, Batman Annual #4, Batman Eternal #23

== Volume Four ==
Titan would relaunch 'Batman' from issue #1 once again in October 2016, now printing stories from the DC Rebirth publishing event. This fourth volume ran for fourteen issues and would also prove to be the title's final, with Titan ceasing publication of all their DC Comics titles in December 2018.

== Controversy ==
Volume Two, issue #18 featured an All-Star Batman and Robin story which caused controversy due to the Joker referring to Gotham as "a sad old whore" and choking a woman to death. Furthermore, the Joker's assistant was a topless woman sporting swastikas on her breasts (a character who previously featured in The Dark Knight Returns). The issue featured no warning of this content and the issue was discussed by parents on the Irish Radio Talkshow Liveline, hosted by Joe Duffy. It criticized stores for featuring the magazine on the bottom shelf alongside conventional children's comics such as Postman Pat. The issue was defended by fans, who stated that it was merely an adult storyline.

Issue #20 of Batman Legends featured a warning stating that the magazine is 'Recommended for children of 12 years or older'. Some later issues had a "VIOLENT IMAGES" or a "Rated T for Teen" warning on the front cover of the magazine.

== Related titles ==
Titan followed the success of Batman Legends with several other DC Comics titles following the same format, beginning with Superman Legends in March 2007. Justice League Legends and DC Universe Presents Batman Superman followed later in 2007.

Titan launched a secondary Batman title in July 2012, initially titled Batman: The Dark Knight and occasionally referred to as simply The Dark Knight, which began by reprinting the US New 52 titles Batman: The Dark Knight and Detective Comics. The title would be rebranded several times before its 2018 cancellation, first relaunching in January 2014 as Batman: Arkham. Gotham Central would subsequently replace that title, before it was again rebranded as All-Star Batman in February 2017, coinciding with the launch of DC Rebirth.
