= Stel =

- Stel, as depicted in Hal Jordan and the Green Lantern Corps #13 (January 2017), art by Ethan Van Sciver.

Publication information
- Publisher: DC Comics
- First appearance: Green Lantern (vol. 2) #11 (March 1962)
- Created by: John Broome; Gil Kane

In-story information
- Species: Grendan
- Place of origin: Grenda
- Team affiliations: Green Lantern Corps
- Abilities: Power Ring

Stel is a superhero appearing in DC Comics, primarily as a member of the Green Lantern Corps for space sector 3009. He first appeared in DC Comics' Green Lantern (vol. 2) #11 (March 1962), and was created by writer John Broome and artist Gil Kane.

== Fictional character biography ==
Stel was trained by the villain Sinestro before he became Hal Jordan's greatest foe. Stel serves the Green Lantern Corps through many of its battles, including a breakout from the Prison Planet of the Guardians of the Universe, an invasion by Qwardians, an attack by the alliance of Nekron, Lord of the Unliving, and the rogue Guardian Krona. It is during this confrontation that Krona kills Stel, tearing him to pieces before he is found by his fellow Lanterns. Stel gives the Lanterns a vital clue with his last breath. Later he is taken back to Grenda to be given a hero's burial.

During Stel's funeral the Krydos, enemy of the Grendans, attack. Stel's successor as Green Lantern arrives to help deal with the Krydos, but is himself attacked by a Grendan named Yron. Yron believes that Stel has failed as a Green Lantern due to the repeated Krydos attacks that Grenda suffers. Forcing the Green Lantern to take him to Oa, Yron protests to the Guardians that he would be a suitable choice to defend his planet and sector. The Guardians agree and gave Yron his own power ring. Yron's efforts to defend and then attack the Krydos prove to be disastrous, as his tactics end up killing many Grendans. Dying from an attack, Yron realizes that Stel was the better Lantern, acknowledging that Stel's lack of offensive action against the Krydos was because he recognized when not to take action rather than just because he was afraid, and with one last push of willpower, Yron brings Stel back to life. Stel routs the Krydos threat and is hailed as a hero while the dead Yron is vilified. The resurrected Stel, however, pronounces Yron a hero and wants to hear of his action while others fled and cowered, rather than of his failure.

Stel (left), with his partner, Green Man, from Green Lantern Corps: Recharge #4 (February 2006). Art by Patrick Gleason and Prentis Rollins.

Stel served with the Corps during the Crisis on Infinite Earths, through Hal Jordan's descent into madness and the loss of the power rings. With the Green Lantern Corps reinstated after the surviving Green Lanterns defeat Parallax on Earth, Stel joins again and is partnered with the Green Man. Stel helps a group of overwhelmed Lanterns, which include Soranik Natu, Kyle Rayner, Kilowog, Guy Gardner and two other Lantern rookies, Isamot Kol and Vath Sarn. The entire group, many with low power levels, then face Spider Guild forces.

Stel was thought annihilated by an anti-matter explosion caused by a mind-controlled Green Man. Against all odds, he manages to survive the blast. A repentant Green Man finds Stel, and the two head to Mogo to repair themselves. Stel uses his ring's energy to compensate for his missing parts. On arriving the two find themselves, and Mogo, under attack by the Sinestro Corps. Despite having no chance of surviving, even with the addition of a fourth Lantern, all involved are determined to stay. Reinforcements arrive just in time, though in the ensuing battles many Lanterns are killed.

Stel is later seen trying to divert space debris to continue rebuilding himself. An unavoidable recall to Oa stops this. Stel and other Lanterns are then sent deep into the forbidden Okarran system in order to root out Sinestro Corps members. Stel is seen pursuing a Sinestro Corps member into the Vega system, where both are attacked by an Orange Lantern. Stel is badly wounded and sent back to Oa with the Orange Lantern's symbol burned onto his chest as a message to the Guardians from Larfleeze.

Stel is on Oa during "Blackest Night" storyline, when deceased Green Lanterns return in an attempt to harvest hearts. Following these events, Kilowog chose Stel as his replacement as the drill instructor for all Green Lantern recruits.

Hal Jordan defies the Guardians by working with their enemies to corral powerful entities. Stel is part of a Green Lantern force sent to arrest Hal. He works with Salakk, B'Dg, Turytt, Norchavius, Meadlux, and Lok Neboora. Hal attempts to recruit them to aid in his quest and Stel argues for the group to listen. At that moment, malicious intervention with the Green Lantern power battery causes the group to go mad and attempt to kill Hal. This situation erupts into the War of the Green Lanterns.

Stel is later seen assisting Green Lanterns against the brainwashing menace of Starro.

== In other media ==
- Stel makes a non-speaking cameo appearance in the Justice League Unlimited episode "The Return".
- Stel makes a non-speaking cameo appearance in the Batman: the Brave and the Bold episode "Day of the Dark Knight!".
- Stel makes non-speaking cameo appearances in Green Lantern.
