= Green Lantern Corps: Recharge =

US comic book series

- Cover image to Green Lantern Corps: Recharge #1. Art by Patrick Gleason.

Publication information
- Publisher: DC Comics
- Schedule: Monthly
- Format: Limited series
- Publication date: November 2005 – March 2006
- No. of issues: 5
- Main character(s): Guy Gardner; Kyle Rayner; Kilowog; John Stewart; Hal Jordan; Green Lantern Corps; Guardians of the Universe

Creative team
- Written by: Geoff Johns; Dave Gibbons
- Penciller: Patrick Gleason
- Inker(s): Christian Alamy; Prentis Rollins

Green Lantern Corps: Recharge was a five-issue, monthly comic book limited series that was published by DC Comics from November 2005 to March 2006. The series was written by Geoff Johns and Dave Gibbons and illustrated by Patrick Gleason. The series starred several members of the Green Lantern Corps, an intergalactic police force in the DC Universe and was one of two follow-ups (the other being a fourth volume of Green Lantern, with Hal Jordan as the main character) to the mini-series Green Lantern: Rebirth, which had been published earlier in 2005. It is notable for featuring the first appearances of Soranik Natu, Vath Sarn, and Isamot Kol, members of the Green Lantern Corps who would serve as recurring characters in future Green Lanterns storylines written by Johns and other writers.

A monthly ongoing Green Lantern Corps debuted in June 2006, the first such monthly series since 1988.

== Backstory ==
In 1994, DC Comics published the controversial storyline "Emerald Twilight", which established Hal Jordan as the supervillain Parallax and introduced the Green Lantern Kyle Rayner. In 2005, Jordan was redeemed and resurrected in the miniseries Green Lantern: Rebirth. Rebirth, along with the subsequent new volume of the Green Lantern monthly series, returned Jordan to the status of "star" Green Lantern of Earth. It also returned former Lantern officer Guy Gardner to the ranks of the Corps.

== Synopsis ==
The Guardians of the Universe summon Guy Gardner and Kyle Rayner to the Green Lantern Corps' headquarters Oa amidst a massive recruitment drive. Among the new recruits is Korugarian neurosurgeon Soranik Natu. Because of Korugar's history with the former Green Lantern Sinestro and the death of fellow Korugarian Katma Tui, Natu initially refuses the ring, but reluctantly takes it to save the life of a patient. Two other recruits are plucked from opposite sides of the Rann-Thanagar War: Rannian soldier Vath Sarn and Thanagar native Isamot Kol.

Ganthet, the leader of the Guardians, announces that several Green Lanterns have been killed by the sudden manifestation of black holes. He also warns that the Rann-Thanagar War has spread and may eventually affect Oa and the Corps. Meanwhile, Natu has gone missing, finding herself in an unidentified location devoid of light and filled with web-like objects, and a dead Green Lantern. Gardner is dismayed to learn that he is to help train the new recruits, which he sees as little more than babysitting. He decides to leave Oa, but head trainer Kilowog manages to make him stay.

The Green Lanterns' rings pick up a signal from Soranik Natu, locating her in the Vega star system. The pact between the Psions and the Guardians restricts Green Lanterns from entering that system, but Rayner and Gardner head there anyway. Meanwhile, new recruits Vath Sarn and Isamot Kol are assigned to divert ships away from an unstable star. The star goes nova, and the two Lanterns attempt to pull the ship from the ensuing black hole, but are sucked in along with the arriving Kilowog.

The three find themselves in a nest of some sort, with a horde of spiders approaching, and the skeletons of the creatures' previous victims beneath their feet. Kilowog, Sarn and Kol fight off the creatures, and escape from the planet into outer space, where they encounter a mechanical planet. Rayner and Gardner arrive in the Vega system, where they find a ringless Natu held prisoner by unidentified aliens. Natu at first shows no signs of life, but soon reanimates via her ring. While being imprisoned, she ordered her ring to slow down her vital processes, so that she would appear to be a lump of organic waste. After fleeing from a group of bounty hunters, the group finds Kilowog.

It turns out that the mechanical planet is the nest of the Spider Guild. The Spider Guild is responsible for various black holes and soon attacks Oa. Kilowog summons all Green Lanterns to Oa's Central Power Battery. Gardner tells the entire Corps to fire on Oa's sun to first stabilize it, and then to feed energy back to Vega to destroy the Guild's nest. While the spiders continue to attack, killing some Green Lanterns, the sun is slowly stabilized, overloading the Guild's subspace web. Both Oa's sun and the Guild Nest are destroyed.

In the aftermath of the Corps' victory, the Guardians fear retribution from the Psions for intruding into the Vega system. Ganthet adds that they must fortify their damaged citadel, and suggests it may be time to make the universe afraid of them. Salaak tells Gardner the Guardians are pleased with the exceptional qualities he has displayed, and are promoting him to Lantern #1 of the Corps Honor Guard.
