= List of Green Lanterns =

Numerous members of the Green Lantern Corps

The Green Lantern Corps, a fictional organization appearing in comics published by DC, consists of a membership of at least 7200 members, with two assigned per sector (originally 3600 members, one per sector). Additionally, there are assorted other members who fulfill roles other than patrolling. While the characters Alan Scott, Hal Jordan, Guy Gardner, John Stewart, Kyle Rayner, Simon Baz, and Jessica Cruz are primarily associated with the name, numerous other members of the Corps have appeared in DC Comics.

== Eponymous Green Lanterns ==
These eight characters are most closely associated with the name "Green Lantern" and have been the title characters of Green Lantern comics.

=== Alan Scott ===
Alan Scott was the original Green Lantern character created in the Golden Age of Comic Books. Alan created the mantle and identity of Green Lantern by himself and is not associated with the Green Lantern Corps, since his power ring was de-authorized by the Guardians before he even obtained it. Prior to the Crisis, Scott's ring ran on magic and not the Central Power Battery of Oa. In The New 52, Alan Scott is the modern-day Green Lantern for Earth 2.

=== Hal Jordan ===
Hal Jordan was created in 1959 by writer John Broome and artist Gil Kane and first appeared in Showcase #22 (October 1959). Hal Jordan is a reinvention of the Green Lantern concept and is a member, and occasionally leader, of the Green Lantern Corps, as well as a founding member of the Justice League. Kane drew visual inspiration for Hal from Hollywood actor Paul Newman.

=== Guy Gardner ===
Guy Gardner is a core member of the Green Lantern family of characters, and, for a time, (late 1980s through mid-1990s) was also a significant member of the Justice League. He was created by John Broome and Gil Kane in Green Lantern (vol. 2) #59 (March 1968), even though the character was changed significantly in the 1980s by Steve Englehart and Joe Staton, who turned him into a jingoistic parody of an ultra-macho "red-blooded American male". Gardner's appearance was originally patterned on actor Martin Milner.

=== John Stewart ===
John Stewart was the fourth African-American superhero to appear in DC Comics. The character was created by Dennis O'Neil and Neal Adams, and first appeared in Green Lantern (vol. 2) #87 (December 1971), when artist Neal Adams came up with the idea of a substitute Green Lantern. Stewart's original design was based on actor Sidney Poitier.

=== Kyle Rayner ===
Created by writer Ron Marz and artist Darryl Banks, Rayner first appeared in Green Lantern (vol. 3) #48 (1994), as part of the "Emerald Twilight" storyline, becoming the sole Green Lantern for years through the late 1990s and mid-2000s. During this period, he was also briefly known as Ion.

=== Simon Baz ===
Created by writer Geoff Johns and artist Doug Mahnke, Simon first appeared in 2012 following the New 52 as part of the story arc "Rise of the Third Army", replacing Hal Jordan as the Green Lantern of Earth's sector. Prior to this, the character made an unnamed cameo in Free Comic Book Day Special Edition #1. He was later added to the Justice League in 2013.

=== Jessica Cruz ===
Created by Geoff Johns, she is the first female human member of the Green Lantern Corps and the Justice League. Jessica Cruz appears briefly in Green Lantern (vol. 5) #20 (July 2013), but did not make her official debut until the last pages of Justice League (vol. 2) #30, when the Ring of Volthoom locates her. She was dubbed "Power Ring" while she was host to the Ring of Volthoom, but is not a member of the Crime Syndicate of America. Cruz became an official member of the Green Lantern Corps at the end of the Darkseid War storyline.

=== Sojourner Mullein ===
Created by writer N.K. Jemisin and artist Jamal Campbell as part of the imprint Young Animal, Sojourner "Jo" Mullein is introduced as an Earth rookie Green Lantern sent to the alien metropolis City Enduring at the edge of the universe in the maxi-series Far Sector. She is a member of the Justice League as featured in "Future State."

== Other Green Lanterns of Earth's sector ==
With the exception of Yalan Gur, these characters have also served as the Green Lantern for Sector 2814 (which includes Mars).

=== Jade ===
Jade is the daughter of the Green Lantern, Alan Scott, and Rose Canton. Jade has a twin brother named Todd Rice, who is better known by the title Obsidian.

Jade is a founding member of Infinity, Inc. She has worked with the Justice League and the Justice Society of America. She is also a member and leader of the Outsiders. After being given a spare power ring, she joined the newly resurrected Green Lantern Corps. When she joined the corp, she became the first female Green Lantern from Earth.

=== Rond Vidar ===
Rond Vidar was the son of Universo, a prominent supervillain of the Legion of Super-Heroes. He is the only person to be naturally immune to Universo’s hypnotism, and has aided the Legion of Super-Heroes many times, even becoming a temporary member. After the events of Zero Hour, his character was changed to a scientist with no powers who worked at the Time institute. During this, the Character Lori Morning, a member of the Legion of Super-Heroes who used a device called an “H-Dial”, has a crush on him.

=== Yalan Gur ===
Yalan Gur is a Green Lantern introduced as part of an effort to reconcile the Golden Age Green Lantern's origin with the later introduction of the Green Lantern Corps. He is a red-scaled, reptilian humanoid, assigned to sector 2814 in the 10th century. Yalan Gur was once one of the greatest of the Green Lantern Corps, and, in the 10th century by Earth reckoning, the Guardians of the Universe chose to remove the customary weakness to the color yellow from his power ring. Without this limitation, however, he was corrupted by power, and he came to Earth and enslaved the people of China. The Guardians of the Universe thwarted Yalan by adding a new weakness of wood to his ring, allowing villagers to overwhelm and mortally wound him. The dying Yalan Gur fled into Earth's upper atmosphere, where he merged with his power battery as he died. His lantern then collided with a fragment of the Starheart and was merged with its magical essence, turning into the Green Flame that becomes the source of Alan Scott's power.

==== Yalan Gur in other media ====
Yalan Gur makes a non-speaking appearance in Justice League, where he is killed in battle with Steppenwolf's army. In Zack Snyder's Justice League, he is instead killed by Darkseid.

=== Jong Li ===
Jong Li is a Green Lantern introduced in Green Lantern, Dragon Lord #1 (June 2001), written by Doug Moench and drawn by Paul Gulacy. He is Earth's first Green Lantern and was a monk raised in the Temple of the Dragon Lords in China. When Jong Li was growing up, he was taught of the Dragon Lords, beings who ruled in the "Golden Age" of man, and that under these lords, man prospered. He was taught to renounce all earthly possessions and live a life of peace and discipline, but then one day, a concubine named Jade Moon came to him in his temple, begging for help in trying to escape her bonds. Jong Li tried to help her but failed, and his temple and fellow monks were ravaged by the emperor's troops and their commander. Jong Li later encountered a representative of the Guardians of the Universe who gave him a power ring and a Lantern to "Oppose Evil, Ease Suffering, and Protect the Innocent." Jong Li later rescued Jade and learned of Lung Mountain, where the last Dragon Lords supposedly lived. He set out to seek their higher authority and, with their Blessing of Fire, became the last Dragon Lord of the Earth, finally defeating the evil emperor's forces and saving his people.

=== Laham ===
Laham of Scylla is introduced in Green Lantern Corps Quarterly #2 (Autumn 1992). He is killed off-panel during a surprise invasion of his home planet. Upon his death, his ring passes to Waverly Sayre, who becomes good friends with Laham's widow. Laham first physically appears as a statue in the Crypts on Oa.

=== Waverly Sayre ===
Waverly Sayre is a pioneer living on the frontier in the early years of the United States. Hoping to start a family, Waverly falls into depression when his wife dies in childbirth, taking their newborn son with her. As he contemplates suicide, the late Laham's ring appears to him and selects him as Laham's successor. Initially believing the ring to be a manifestation of Satan, Sayre quickly grows into his new role, taking his faithful dog with him on every mission.

=== Daniel Young ===
Daniel Young was a sheriff in Montana, in 1873. During his chase of a band of outlaws, Daniel was summoned by Abin Sur, wounded in a battle in deep space. While Abin Sur convalesced in his ship, healed by its machines, Young was a temporary replacement, and he used the power of the ring to bring the outlaws to justice. Afterward, the ring returned to Abin Sur.

=== Starkadr ===
Starkadr first appeared in Legends of the DC Universe #20 (September 1999). He is a hulking orange alien who is mortally wounded defending the planet Ungara from the forces of the Traitor. Though he succeeds in driving the Traitor from the planet, Starkadr dies and passes his ring to the Ungaran Abin Sur. He rises as an undead Black Lantern and fights the living Green Lanterns.

=== Anya Savenlovich ===
Anya Savenlovich first appeared in Green Lantern: The New Corps #1 (March 1999). She is a lieutenant colonel from the Soviet Air Forces who was in suspended animation after participating in a space mission back in 1964. Kyle Rayner recruited her as a member of the New Corps in a bid to rebuild the Green Lantern Corps. However, finding his attempt was a failure, Kyle took Anya's ring. Aware that the Soviet Union no longer exists, Anya decides to stay in space to find a new purpose.

== Green Lantern Corps of Earth ==
These Green Lanterns were stationed on Earth to safeguard the planet after the events of the Crisis on Infinite Earths.

== The Lost Lanterns ==
During the 1994 "Emerald Twilight" storyline, many of the Corps members are stripped of their rings and are left to die out in space. A few of them, however, were captured by the Manhunters and used as energy sources for the Manhunters until their eventual rescue. They are known as "the Lost Lanterns."

=== Chaselon ===
Chaselon is the Green Lantern of sector 1416; he first appeared in Green Lantern (vol. 2) #9 (November–December 1961) in a story written by John Broome and drawn by Gil Kane. He is a silicon-based crystalline being with thirteen senses from Barrio III, which was later harvested by the mad Guardian Appa Ali Apsa to create the planet Mosaic. Chaselon has also been a member of the Alpha Lanterns.

==== Chaselon in other media ====
- Chaselon makes a non-speaking cameo appearance in the Duck Dodgers episode "The Green Loontern".
- Chaselon makes a non-speaking cameo appearance in the Justice League Unlimited episode "The Return".
- Chaselon makes a non-speaking cameo appearance in Green Lantern: First Flight.
- Chaselon makes a non-speaking cameo appearance in Green Lantern: Emerald Knights.
- Chaselon makes a non-speaking cameo appearance in Green Lantern (2011).
- Chaselon appears in Green Lantern: The Animated Series, voiced by Tom Kenny.
- Chaselon appears as a character summon in Scribblenauts Unmasked: A DC Comics Adventure.

=== Graf Toren ===
Graf Toren is a Karaxian Light Monk and the Green Lantern of Sector 424. He spent most of his life fighting against the Spider Guild after they entered his sector and creates constructs in a manner akin to a spider web. Initially believed to have been killed by Hal Jordan during the "Emerald Twilight" storyline, Graf Toren is later revealed to have survived and been captured by the Manhunters.

=== Hannu/Honnu ===
Hannu (alternatively spelled Honnu) is the Green Lantern of Sector 2, he first appeared in Green Lantern (vol. 3) #49 (February 1994), in a story written by Ron Marz. He originates from Ovacron 6, whose culture views the use of weapons as disgraceful and dishonorable. As a result, Hannu rarely uses his ring in combat, preferring his brute strength.

=== Laira ===
Laira Omoto is from the planet Jayd in space sector 112. She is trained by her father Kentor Omoto to take over his role as a soldier of the Guardians of the Universe; a Green Lantern of her sector. After the disappearance of her father during "Crisis on Infinite Earths" and the proclamation by the Guardians that he is dead, she is considered for the post of ring bearer and Green Lantern of her sector. Her instructor turns out to be Ke'Haan of Varva: Kilowog's second in command, known for his tough-as-nails training. Eager to please and find a kindred spirit of honor within her teacher, she becomes his prized pupil.

During the Sinestro Corps War event, Laira and the Lost Lanterns come to Hal Jordan's aid on Qward. The group splits up, with Laira, Ke'Haan and Boodikka searching for Ion, and Hal, Graf Toren, and Tomar-Tu looking for John Stewart and Guy Gardner. Laira's group encounters the Anti-Monitor, who kills Ke'Haan, but they are able to recover Ion and return to Oa.

After Ke'Haan is killed, Laira and the Lost Lanterns set out to his home world to deliver news of his death, only to find that his family has been murdered by Sinestro Corps member Amon Sur. Enraged by this, Laira kills Amon. Laira is placed in the custody of the Alpha Lanterns and tried by the Guardians, who find her guilty and strip her of her power ring.

After her trial, Laira is arranged to be transported back to her home world, Jayd, by Hannu. However, a red power ring attacks their ship and chooses Laira as its bearer; making her a Red Lantern. Under the influence of the red light, Laira's personality degenerates to the point where she is little more than a snarling beast; obsessed with revenge against Sinestro and showing no recognition when confronted by Hal Jordan and John Stewart. During a skirmish on the prison planet Ysmault with multiple Lanterns, Hal reaches Laira, but she is killed by Sinestro.

==== Laira in other media ====
- Laira appears in Green Lantern: Emerald Knights, voiced by Kelly Hu. This version is an elite warrior and a princess trained by her father. As a Green Lantern, she is sent to her home planet to investigate a mysterious warlord known as the Golden Dragon, who turns out to be her own father. Following a fierce hand-to-hand battle, Laira defeats her father, who then chooses to take his own life, accepting responsibility for his actions; in the aftermath, Laira decides to remain behind to protect her planet.
- Laira makes a non-speaking cameo appearance in Green Lantern: Beware My Power as one of several Green Lanterns killed by Sinestro and a possessed Hal Jordan.
- Laira appears as a character summon in Scribblenauts Unmasked: A DC Comics Adventure.

=== Lashorr ===
Lashorr is the Green Lantern of Sector 3453. She first appeared in Green Lantern (vol. 4) #12 (July 2006) in a story written by Geoff Johns and drawn by Ivan Reis. Lashorr had a fling with a younger Salaak before she vanished in combat with the Dominators. She is discovered alive on the Manhunter homeworld of Biot and returned to her sector, albeit with a case of post-traumatic stress disorder.

=== Relok Hag ===
Sector 173; Relok Hag first appeared in Green Lantern (vol. 4) #12. Relok is a centaur-like barbarian who leads a crusade against the Dominators for experimenting on his people. He vanished in battle with them alongside Lashorr and others, only to be found alive on Biot.

== Green Lantern Honor Guard ==
The Honor Guard is an elite group of Lanterns who serve as troubleshooters and special operatives.

=== Apros ===
The Green Lantern of Sector 3. Apros first appeared in Tales of the Green Lantern Corps #1 (May 1981) in a story written by Mike W. Barr and Len Wein, with pencils by Joe Staton. Apros is a sentient plant from the planet -7pi. It is one of the Corps' oldest and most decorated veterans. Apros serves in the Honor Guard during the war with Krona and Nekron, but appears to have returned to a sector patrol position following the rebuilding of the Corps.

=== K'ryssma ===
Sector 1890; First appeared in Tales of the Green Lantern Corps #1. K'ryssma is an insectoid alien resembling a humanoid butterfly. She is trapped in a chrysalis state during the rampage of the mad Guardian Appa Ali Apsa. She emerges in a completely different form in the Mosaic world. After the destruction of the Corps at the hands of Parallax, K'ryssma joined the Darkstars, where she was murdered by Grayven.

=== Tomar-Re ===
Guy Gardner and Kyle Rayner have also served as Honor Guard members.

== The Alpha Lanterns ==
The Alpha Lanterns are Corps members who have been transformed into cyborgs and act as the Corps' Internal Affairs officers.

=== Kraken ===
Part of the duo (with Raker Qarrigat) dedicated to bringing peace to their homeworld of Apokolips, Kraken becomes an Alpha Lantern to further this goal, unaware of the toll it will take on her emotions. In Final Crisis, Kraken is possessed by Granny Goodness, who uses her to subdue the Green Lanterns of Earth, Hal Jordan and John Stewart, and capture Batman for use as a scientific test subject by Darkseid. When Jordan is put on trial for an attempted murder performed by Kraken, she is unmasked by Kyle Rayner and Guy Gardner before a sentence can be passed, and attempts at her primary mission, to obtain the central Green Lantern Power Battery for Darkseid. She is defeated by Jordan and taken into custody by the other Alpha Lanterns.

=== Varix ===
Sector 69; Varix first appeared in Tales of the Green Lantern Corps Annual #2. Varix comes from the planet Naktos, which was devastated by a yellow plague. This, and the fact that his predecessor died of a mysterious brain disease, led Varix to become a hypochondriac. Varix is described by Vurytt as his religion being his uniform, and in Varix's own words, as living for "justice and justice alone". Varix states that his people live to obey the law, and there has not been a murder on his planet for over 74 years. His dedication to justice comes to a head when the Alpha Lanterns attempt to execute John Stewart when he kills another Green Lantern, who was going to reveal crucial information. Recognizing that Stewart's actions had been committed for the right reasons even if they were questionable on the surface, Varix assists the Green Lanterns in destroying the other Alpha Lanterns before killing himself.

== The Corpse ==
The Corpse are a black ops division of the Green Lantern Corps who use a disc that is swallowed to imitate the abilities of a power ring, but appear purple in color.

=== Von Daggle ===
The leader of the Corpse, Von Daggle, is a Durlan who is called back into service following the return of the Guardians of the Universe after their deaths at the hands of Parallax.

=== R'amey Holl ===
Sector 700, she first appeared in Green Lantern Corps #7. She is an insect-like humanoid, exhibiting traits similar to those of a butterfly.

==== R'amey Holl in other media ====
- R'amey Holl makes a non-speaking cameo appearance in Green Lantern.
- R'amey Holl appears as a character summon in Scribblenauts Unmasked: A DC Comics Adventure.

== The First Seven ==
The Green Lantern Corps were formed 10 billion years in the past when the Guardian Rami tasked seven aliens with bringing Volthoom to justice. Most of them are killed in battle with Volthoom, with Tyran'r being the only survivor.

=== Alitha ===
Alitha of Galatica is an Old God warrior from the Third World, the world predating the Fourth World.

=== Z'Kran Z'Rann ===
Z'Kran Z'Rann is a White Martian and the only survivor of his village being massacred by vagabonds. After killing the vagabonds, he is recruited into the Green Lantern Corps.

=== Tyran'r ===
Tyran'r is a Tamaranean, a humanoid tiger-like alien and the guardian of the Vault of Shadows where the six other Lanterns are buried. He previously killed Mrak'r the Wizard King of Tamaran, who captured him and destroyed his sword.

=== Kaja Dox ===
Kaja Dox is a Coluan and computer repairer who possesses an enhanced third-level intelligence.

=== Jan-Al ===
Jan-Al was a Kryptonian and member of Krypton's first mission colonization.

=== Calleen ===
Calleen is an Alstarian, a plant elemental who was born long after Alstair was ravaged. After restoring the planet's life, she is recruited into the Lanterns.

=== Brill ===
Brill was a member of the Hive, an artificial hive mind. He is one of several Hive members chosen to leave the group to discover their origins.

== Other Green Lanterns ==
=== 2-6-8-1-7-9-5 ===
First appeared in Green Lantern Vol 5 #21 (August, 2013). 2-6-8-1-7-9-5 (known as Two-Six) is the Green Lantern of Sector 916 and is from the planet Numericon.

=== Aa ===
Sector 904; First appeared in Green Lantern (vol. 3) #21 (February 1992).

=== Adam ===
Sector 1055; First appeared in Green Lantern Quarterly #5 (Summer 1993).

=== Alia ===
Sector 281; first appeared in Valor #5 (March 1993).

=== Amanita ===
Sector 3100; First appeared in Green Lantern (vol. 3) #20 (January 1992).

=== Arkkis Chummuck ===
The Green Lantern of Sector 3014. He first appeared in Green Lantern (vol. 2) #130 (July 1980), and was created by Bob Toomey and Alex Saviuk.

Originating from a warlike culture on the planet Toomey VI, Chummuck was a peaceful archivist who became a Green Lantern after killing the Lantern Reever in an honor-based battle. He was killed fighting Maaldor.

==== Arkkis Chummuck in other media ====
- Arkkis Chummuck appears in Justice League, voiced by Michael Rosenbaum. This version is a friend of John Stewart who is later killed by Despero.
- Arkkis Chummuck makes a non-speaking cameo appearance in Green Lantern: First Flight.
- Arkkis Chummuck makes a non-speaking cameo appearance in Green Lantern: Emerald Knights.
- Arkkis Chummuck makes a non-speaking cameo appearance in Justice League Dark: Apokolips War as one of several Green Lanterns who are killed by Darkseid.
- Arkkis Chummuck appears as a character summon in Scribblenauts Unmasked: A DC Comics Adventure.

=== Arx ===
The Green Lantern of Sector 488. He first appeared in Green Lantern Corps (vol. 2) #1 (August 2006), in a story written by Dave Gibbons and penciled by Patrick Gleason. Arix is killed in a Sinestro Corps ambush in Final Crisis: Rage of the Red Lanterns #1 (December 2008).

=== Ash ===
Sector 658; (full name Ashel Sabian Formanta) is a tattooed purple humanoid. First appeared in Green Lantern Quarterly #7 (Winter, 1993). Ash's primary concern was to hunt the "bloodseekers", vampire-like aliens who killed his beloved Tasha, and he joined the Green Lantern Corps to pursue these creatures into "the darkest corners of the cosmos". He was tasked by the Guardian Scar to find the Anti-Monitor's corpse. However, he and Saarek are killed on Ryut and converted into Black Lanterns.

=== Ash-Pak-Glif ===
Sector 312. A rock-like humanoid, it first appeared in Green Lantern 80-Page Giant #3 (August 2000).

=== B'dg ===
First appeared in Green Lantern (vol. 4) #4 (October 2005). B'dg (pronounced "Badge") is one of the first recruits of the reconstructed Corps. Hailing from the planet H'lven like his predecessor Ch'p, B'dg first sees action when the Spider Guild invades Oa. He is trained on how to overcome the yellow impurity weakness of his ring in the midst of battle.

During the New 52, Salaak sends B'dg to Earth to locate Hal Jordan because B'dg can blend in with the planet's indigenous creatures. He is the first alien Green Lantern encountered by Simon Baz, who had inherited Hal and Sinestro's fused ring. He instructs Baz in the basics of being a Green Lantern and helps him track down Black Hand.

==== B'dg in other media ====
- B'dg appears in the "DC Super-Pets" segment of DC Nation Shorts, voiced by Elisha Yaffe.
- B'dg appears in the Robot Chicken DC Comics Special, voiced by Tom Root.
- B'dg appears in Lego DC Comics Super Heroes: The Flash, voiced by Eric Bauza.
- B'dg appears as a character summon in Scribblenauts Unmasked: A DC Comics Adventure.
- B'dg appears as a playable character in Lego DC Super-Villains, voiced by Roger Craig Smith.

=== B'Shi ===
B'Shi is one of several Green Lanterns appearing in the "A Lantern Against the Dark: A Forgotten Tale of the Green Lantern Corps" story, from Green Lantern 80-Page Giant #3. She is a monkey-like Green Lantern from the jungle world of Suirpalam, who is recruited into the Green Lantern Corps by Raker Qarrigat (and in turn recruits Ash-Pak-Glif) as part of preparations for a Green Lantern Corps invasion of Apokolips. She participates in this invasion, and is killed along with hundreds of other Green Lanterns when it quickly turns into a debacle.

=== Bloobert Cob ===
First appeared in Green Lantern (vol. 2) #46 as a nameless background Lantern. Bloobert Cob was later given a name, sector assignment, and history as online "fanon". These details were later canonized by writer Van Jensen in Green Lantern Corps (vol. 4) #31. Bloobert Cob was the Green Lantern of Sector 74, and was one of the Lanterns captured and replaced by Durlan impostors. When the Durlan fakes were uncovered, the Durlan commanders ordered their Khund allies to execute the Lantern prisoners, including Bloobert Cob.

=== Brik ===
First appeared in Green Lantern (vol. 3) #12 (May 1991). The Green Lantern of Sector 904, Brik comes from the planet Dryad and, like her sector partner, is composed entirely of organic rock. Originally recruited by Hal Jordan, Brik was one of hundreds of veteran Green Lanterns to return to active service upon the restoration of the Green Lantern Corps. Brik once had feelings for Jordan, and her partner, Aa, suspects that she still might. In truth, her feelings are for another Earthman.

=== Brokk ===
Sector 981; First appeared in Tales of the Green Lantern Corps #1.

=== Bzzd ===
First appeared in Green Lantern Corps (vol. 2) #12 (July 2007). Bzzd is a small wasp-like Green Lantern from the planet Apiaton, assigned to sector 2261. He is the partner of Mogo. In battle, he usually creates oversized constructs with his power ring. Bzzd often faces extra scrutiny from his fellow Lanterns because of his size but he has shown that his willpower is as strong as anyone else's. Bzzd was killed in battle with Mongul, with his ring being given to Mother Mercy. Bzzd was resurrected following The New 52 continuity reboot.

==== In other media ====
- Bzzd makes a non-speaking cameo appearance in Green Lantern.
- Bzzd appears as a character summon in Scribblenauts Unmasked: A DC Comics Adventure.

=== Charlie Vicker ===
First appeared in Green Lantern (vol. 2) #55 (September 1967) in a story written by John Broome and drawn by Gil Kane. Charlie Vicker of planet Earth is a former actor who portrayed Green Lantern in a TV show. Vicker led a fast lifestyle, and used his brother Roger as an understudy. One day, after a hectic night of parties, Roger filled in for his incapacitated brother. Roger was killed in a live television broadcast by an alien that had mistaken him for the real Green Lantern. A repentant Vicker works with Green Lantern to bring the aliens to justice. The Guardians, impressed with Vicker's spirit, make him a Green Lantern of sector 3319. Vicker was the second human to join the Green Lantern Corps after Hal Jordan. His time as a Green Lantern is marked with difficulty, as his sector is populated entirely by non-humanoid aliens. Eventually, he comes to feel compassion for his alien charges.

After the dissolution of the Corps, John Stewart recruited Vicker into the Darkstars organization. He later died in battle, defending the planet Rann from Grayven.

=== Cimfet Tau ===
Sector 3588; first appeared in Tales of the Green Lantern Corps Annual #2.

=== The Collective ===
When the Guardians of the Universe sent TO-T-U-K to a planet to find his replacement as the Green Lantern of Sector 1287, he was unable to find one. When he observed the Collective trap and consume a bird-like creature, he learned that the Collective's mental aptitudes increased. TO-T-U-K realizing that if he allowed himself and the power battery to be consumed by the Collective, then it would gain the ability to think and act. He also gave the Collective a power battery.

Because of the large number of orbs that make up the Collective and the ability of the Collective to spread out Sector 1287 is considered to be one of the safest in the universe.

=== Dalor ===
Sector 2813; first appeared in Green Lantern (vol. 2) #154.

=== Dkrtzy RRR ===
Dkrtzy RRR of Sector 188 is a bio-sentient mathematical equation. He is first mentioned in Green Lantern (vol. 2) #188 (May 1985) in the story "Mogo Doesn't Socialize", written by Alan Moore and drawn by Dave Gibbons. It was apparently discovered by a mathematician named Timph Rye in an attempt to prove that willpower could be derived formulaically. Dkrzty's method of eliminating its enemies is erasing their minds by entering them, noted as a source of controversy by the Guardians.

=== Driq ===
First appeared in Green Lantern (vol. 2) #217 (October 1987). Driq was killed by Sinestro and Sentient Sector 3600, but his ring inexplicably prevented his life force from escaping his body. Each time he is destroyed, the ring reanimates his body. Driq finally dies when Sinestro is executed and all of the Green Lantern rings lose their power. During the Blackest Night, Driq was revived as a Black Lantern, with the right side of his body unaffected with ring intact. Unlike the rest of the Black Lanterns, Driq retains his true personality, speaking words of encouragement to John Stewart through his ring, and eventually leading his former comrade to the mass of black rings holding Xanshi together.

=== Eddore ===
Eddore from the planet Tront was a gaseous creature, vaguely amoeboid in appearance. He died during Crisis on Infinite Earths. Eddore, along with Arisia, were created by writer Mike W. Barr in his Tales of the Green Lantern Corps miniseries as a tip of the hat to E.E. Smith's Lensman series. Arisia and Eddore are the planets of the series' super-intelligent benevolent and evil races, respectively.

=== Ekron ===
Ekron from an unknown planet, was a giant floating head with a smaller alien inside "piloting" the large head of Ekron. One of its eyes was removed at some point and used by various character, notably the Emerald Empress. Ekron later teamed-up with Animal Man, Adam Strange, Starfire, and Lobo against Lady Styx. Ekron dies in this battle, driving Styx into a Sun-Eater.

=== Ermey ===
Ermey first appeared in Blackest Night: Tales of the Corps #3 (September 2009); he was the drill sergeant who trained Kilowog. He trained new recruits brutally, but only so they would be strong enough to survive as Lanterns. He was killed during a surprise attack on a group of Lanterns. It was from Ermey that Kilowog picked up the term "Poozer" which means "Useless Rookie". Ermey's name and design are a reference to the actor R. Lee Ermey, who has portrayed Drill Sergeants/figures of military authority in films such as Full Metal Jacket.

Ermey is later resurrected as a Black Lantern, with a more militaristic costume (and using his ring to create a black energy construct of a ceremonial sabre), in a gamble to stir powerful emotions in Kilowog by berating and abusing him for having once saved Sinestro's life and for having failed to train the now dead rookies. The reanimated Ermey enjoys some success as he is able to stir a reaction into Kilowog: a powerful rage against himself. However, before he can claim Kilowog's heart, he and the rest of the fallen Lanterns are ordered to devour the Oan main power battery.

==== Ermey in other media ====
Deegan, a character inspired by Ermey, appears in Green Lantern: Emerald Knights, voiced by Wade Williams.

=== Flodo Span ===
Flodo Span is a gaseous member of the Green Lantern Corps. He has no corporeal body, and holds himself together with his ring. He was a friend of Hal Jordan's, and a member of the Green Lantern Corps of the Kylminade.

=== Galius Zed ===
Galius Zed (also spelled Galius-Zed) is the Green Lantern of sector 1138. He first appeared in Tales of the Green Lantern Corps #2 (June 1981) in the story "Defeat!", written by Mike W. Barr and Len Wein, and drawn by Brian Bolland and Joe Staton. Galius Zed's species have large spherical bodies with normal sized legs and arms. He was first introduced fighting alongside Hal Jordan during the war against Krona and Nekron. He has participated in many battles alongside his fellow Green Lantern Corps, and served as part of the invasion force sent to Qward to destroy the Anti-Green Lantern Corps. He was trusted to take part in the "psychodrama" in which Hal Jordan was tested on his capabilities of being a Green Lantern. Galius survives Crisis on Infinite Earths, but lost his power ring after the trial of Sinestro and the subsequent collapse of the Main Power Battery on Oa.

Fatality kills Galius Zed during her quest for vengeance against John Stewart, who she believes to have facilitated the destruction of her home planet Xanshi. Zed was resurrected following The New 52 and DC Rebirth relaunches.

==== Galius Zed in other media ====
- Galius Zed appears in Justice League, voiced by René Auberjonois. This version is a friend of John Stewart who is later killed by Despero.
- Galius Zed makes non-speaking cameo appearances in Batman: The Brave and the Bold.
- Galius Zed appears in Green Lantern: Emerald Knights, voiced by Bruce Timm.
- Galius Zed makes a non-speaking cameo appearance in Green Lantern.
- Galius Zed makes a non-speaking cameo appearance in Justice League Dark: Apokolips War as one of several Green Lanterns killed by Darkseid.
- Galius Zed appears as a character summon in Scribblenauts Unmasked: A DC Comics Adventure.

=== Ganthet ===
In Blackest Night, Ganthet becomes a deputy Green Lantern to aid Earth's heroes against Nekron and his Black Lantern Corps.

=== Gazzl ===
First appeared in Green Lantern Vol 5 #21 (August 2013). He was the Green Lantern of Sector 1122.

=== G'Hu ===
Sector 2937; first appeared in Green Lantern Corps #1.

==== G'Hu in other media ====
- G'Hu makes non-speaking cameo appearances in Green Lantern: Emerald Knights and Green Lantern.
- G'Hu appears as a character summon in Scribblenauts Unmasked: A DC Comics Adventure.

=== Gpaak ===
Sector 3515; First appeared in Guy Gardner #11.

=== Gretti ===
The Green Lantern Gretti is part of a traveling caravan of "space gypsies" and refuses to stay in one place, roaming from sector to sector at the whim of his caravan. His superiors at the Corps say nothing since he still files his reports on time, but his sector partner Green Man has lately been less and less pleased with the situation. He is killed by Larfleeze, the keeper of the orange light of avarice.

=== Harvid ===
Sector 2937; first appeared in Green Lantern (vol. 2) #161.

=== Horoq Nnot ===
Sector 885; first appeared in Green Lantern (vol. 4) #11. Slain in the purge of Alpha Lanterns.

=== Iolande ===
Sector 1417; first appeared in Green Lantern Corps (vol. 2) #1. Iolande is a princess from planet Betrassus, and Soranik Natu's partner on Sector 1417. She and Natu have clashed during the beginning of their careers as Green Lanterns; however, they eventually get along. She is the only one in the Corps who knows that Natu is Sinestro's daughter.

==== Iolande in other media ====
- Iolande makes a non-speaking cameo appearance in Green Lantern: First Flight.
- Iolande makes a non-speaking cameo appearance in Green Lantern: Emerald Knights.
- Iolande makes a non-speaking cameo appearance in Green Lantern.
- Iolande appears in Green Lantern: The Animated Series, voiced by Tara Strong. This version is the queen of Betrassus who becomes a Green Lantern after her brother Ragnar kills the Lantern Dulok and she inherits his ring.
- Iolande appears as a character summon in Scribblenauts Unmasked: A DC Comics Adventure.

=== Kaylark ===
Sector 1721; first appeared in Green Lantern (vol. 2) #166.

=== Kho Kharhi ===
The Green Lantern of Sector 442. She first appeared in Wonder Woman (vol. 3) #19, and was created by Gail Simone and Bernard Chang. Kho is the young daughter of a Khund ambassador, and was accepted into the Corps due to her strong sense of justice and compassion.

=== Krista X ===
Sector 863; first appeared in Green Lantern (vol. 2) #166.

=== Lan Dibbux ===
Sector 3192; first appeared in Showcase '93 #12.

=== Larvox ===
The Green Lantern of Sector 0017. It first appeared in Green Lantern (vol. 2) #9 in the story "Battle of the Power Rings!", written by John Broome and illustrated by Gil Kane. Larvox is an asexual being that comes from a planet where all beings are part of the whole and there are no individuals. Larvox cannot speak and uses its ring to communicate. After the fall of Oa, Larvox becomes a member of the Darkstars, but rejoins the Corps when the Green Lanterns are reformed.

==== Larvox in other media ====
- Larvox makes non-speaking cameo appearances in the DC Animated Universe series Superman: The Animated Series, Justice League, and Justice League Unlimited.
- Larvox makes a non-speaking cameo appearance in the Duck Dodgers episode "The Green Loontern".
- Larvox makes non-speaking cameo appearances in Batman: The Brave and the Bold.
- Larvox makes a non-speaking cameo appearance in the Green Lantern: The Animated Series episode "Reboot".
- Larvox appears as a character summon in Scribblenauts Unmasked: A DC Comics Adventure.

=== Leezle Pon ===
Leezle Pon is a sentient smallpox virus, first mentioned in Green Lantern (vol. 2) #188 (May 1985). He defeated the Sinestro Corps member Despotellis at the crux of the Sinestro Corps War when Guy Gardner was discovered to have been infected with the virus.

=== Meadlux ===
Sector 1776; first appeared in Green Lantern (vol. 2) #169.

=== Medphyll ===
Medphyll (also spelled Medphyl) is a plant-like alien from planet J586 in Sector 586. A cyclops, his head resembles a head of broccoli. He is known as one of the most skilled Green Lanterns in the Corps and is a faithful friend to Hal Jordan.

==== Medphyll in other media ====
- Medphyll makes a non-speaking cameo appearance in the Duck Dodgers episode "The Green Loontern".
- Medphyll makes non-speaking cameo appearances in Batman: The Brave and the Bold.
- Medphyll appears as a character summon in Scribblenauts Unmasked: A DC Comics Adventure.

=== Morro ===
A Green Lantern from Sector 666. Guy Gardner revealed to Kyle Rayner that Morro requested his duty as penance, as he killed his pets' mother in rage when he wrongfully thought it ate his brother (who was later found alive and well). His first act of atoning for his mistake was to adopt the creature's offspring as his own. Months later, after his brother's death (a natural cause) and the Sinestro Corps War, Morro chose to be the Corps' cryptkeeper. Morro is capable of combat and hunting without his ring, and his primary choice of weapon is his mallet. He is accompanied by several dratures, fearsome dragon-like creatures originating from the same planet as him.

=== Mother Mercy ===
Matris Ater Clementia, or Mother Mercy, is the creator of the Black Mercy plant used by Mongul, and the new Lantern for Sector 2261. She initially created them to find people who are suffering and dying to ease their pain, which created a symbiotic relationship with her. However, the first Mongul discovered the plants and used them to spread his evil, even mutating some of the Black Mercys into giving their victims suffering. Mother Mercy, however, kept her sentience hidden from Mongul. Her abilities to both ease and create fear gave her both a Green Lantern Corps ring and a Sinestro Corps ring to choose from. The Green Lantern ring, which she ultimately chose, came from the recently deceased Bzzd. Mother Mercy first appeared in Green Lantern Corps (vol. 2) #24 (July 2008).

=== NautKeLoi ===
NautKeLoi first appeared in Green Lantern (vol. 2) #9 (December 1961), and was created by John Broome and Gil Kane. He originates from Aeros, a planet entirely covered by water. As he cannot breathe air, he is always seen wearing a glass helmet filled with water.

==== NautLeKoi in other media ====
- NautLeKoi makes a non-speaking cameo appearance in Green Lantern: First Flight.
- NautLeKoi makes a non-speaking cameo appearance in Green Lantern: Emerald Knights.
- NautLeKoi makes a non-speaking cameo appearance in Green Lantern.
- NautLeKoi appears as a character summon in Scribblenauts Unmasked: A DC Comics Adventure.

=== Nemux ===
First appeared in Green Lantern Vol 5 #21 (August 2013). He was the Green Lantern of sector 1006. He died in Green Lantern: The Lost Army #4 (November 2015).

=== Okonoko ===
The Green Lantern of Sector 1110. He first appeared in Green Lantern (vol. 2) #162 (March 1983), and was created by Mike W. Barr. Okonoko is an orange-skinned humanoid with pointed ears, who retired from the Corp after training his replacement Deeter.

=== Olapet ===
Olapet was a plant-based Green Lantern, hailing from the planet of Southern Goldstar. She first appeared in Green Lantern Corps #217 (October 1987), and was created by Steve Englehart and Joe Staton. Olapet carries a seedling of herself in a pouch. She periodically dies and transfers both her memories and the Power Ring to the seedling. She, along with Driq and Flodo Span, were the sole survivors of the Green Lantern Corps of Laminate. The rest were killed by Sinestro and Sentient Sector 3600.

=== Oliversity ===
Sector 2111; first appeared in The Green Lantern Corps #222. Oliversity is a snake-like alien who can create multiple effects with his venom.

=== Opto309v ===
Sector 2260; first appeared in 52 Week 41. Featured in Final Crisis #2, slain by Kalibak two issues later.

=== Orlan ===
Sector 3897; first appeared in The Brave and the Bold (vol. 3) #19. Orlan was from the planet Kahlo. He destroyed a major city of his home planet while under the control of a malevolent energy being, but was later freed from its influence by the Phantom Stranger.

=== Palaqua ===
The Green Lantern of sector 3600, he first appeared in Tales of the Green Lantern Corps Annual #2.

==== Palaqua in other media ====
- Palaqua makes a non-speaking cameo appearance in the Justice League Unlimited episode "The Return".
- Palaqua makes a non-speaking cameo appearance in Green Lantern: First Flight.
- Palaqua appears in Green Lantern: Emerald Knights, voiced by Steve Blum.

=== Penelops ===
Protecting sector 1355, he first appeared in Tales of the Green Lantern Corps #3. He was a veteran Green Lantern who was re-recruited when the Corps returned.

==== Penelops in other media ====
- Penelops makes non-speaking cameo appearances in Green Lantern: First Flight and Green Lantern: Emerald Knights.
- Penelops appears as a character summon in Scribblenauts Unmasked: A DC Comics Adventure.

=== Penn Maricc ===
The Green Lantern of Sector 3333. He first appeared in Tales of the Green Lantern Corps Annual #2 (December 1986), and was created by Mindy Newell and George Freeman. A hot-headed braggart, he frequently clashes with the equally hot-headed Guy Gardner.

=== Perdoo ===
The Green Lantern of Sector 2234. He first appeared in Green Lantern (vol. 3) Annual #5 (1996), and was created by Len Wein and Bill Willingham. Perdoo is from the planet Qualar IV, whose natives are chicken-like humanoids and are unusually timid. He is the only member of his race without fear, and is therefore considered clinically insane.

=== Procanon Kaa ===
Sector 442; first appeared in Green Lantern Corps #224 (May 1988): "The Ultimate Testament!". Despised by the Khunds.

=== Qurina Vint ===
Sector 282; first appeared in Green Lantern Corps (vol. 2) #61 (August 2011): "Beware My Power".

Recruited by Mogo during the War of the Green Lanterns. Her home planet is Calados, where she was a police officer.

=== Raker Qarrigat ===
The Green Lantern of Sector 38, Raker Qarrigat first appeared in Green Lantern 80-Page Giant #3 (2000). He was created by Scott Beatty and primarily operates on Apokolips.

=== Reever of Xanshi ===
Sector 1313; first appeared in Green Lantern (vol. 2) #130 (July 1980): "The Trial of Arkkis Chummuck: Indictment".

=== Remnant Nod ===
Sector 1132; Noted for opposing political oppression. Killed by Red Lantern Corps member Atrocitus.

=== Rori Dag ===
Sector 1234; Rori Dag was the first Green Lantern.

=== Rot Lop Fan ===
Rot Lop Fan is one of several unorthodox members of the Green Lantern Corps created by Alan Moore in Tales of the Green Lantern Corps Annual #3 (1987). After his introduction, he later occasionally appears in Green Lantern Corps group scenes.

In the Tales of the Green Lantern Corps Annual #3 story "In the Blackest Night", Katma Tui is sent by the Guardians of the Universe to a lightless region of space known as the Obsidian Deeps, to recruit a new Green Lantern to protect that region of space. Despite the absolute darkness of the Deeps, Katma's power ring leads her to a completely fearless and honest resident of the Deeps: Rot Lop Fan. However, as Rot Lop Fan's species had evolved in darkness, they had no concept of light and color, and thus Katma was unable to explain how the power ring worked.

Realizing that his species operates by hearing, Katma coaches him to create a hand bell with the ring, and describes the Green Lantern Corps as the "F-Sharp Bell Corps" — "F-Sharp" being a reassuring note for his race in the same manner that green is a reassuring color, and the ring's powers in terms of sound instead of light. She also composes a new oath for him to recite:

In loudest din or hush profound
my ears hear evil's slightest sound
let those who toll out evil's knell
beware my power, the F-Sharp Bell!

Having solved this dilemma, Katma leaves Rot Lop Fan to protect his people, not mentioning the ring's weakness to yellow as the colourless space made it pointless.

==== Rot Lop Fan in other media ====
- Rot Lop Fan makes a non-speaking cameo appearance in Green Lantern.
- Rot Lop Fan appears as a character summon in Scribblenauts Unmasked: A DC Comics Adventure.

=== Saarek ===
Saarek claims to be able to speak with the dead. He helps his fellow Lanterns track and capture the Sinestro Corps member who has been killing rookie Lantern's families, and is later tasked by a rogue Guardian, Scar, to find and speak with the Anti-Monitor's corpse. He later encounters Ash, who was also sent to find the Anti-Monitor, and the two decide to join forces. As they continue their journey, the voices of the dead grow so loud that they rupture Saarek's eardrums, deafening him. The two find the Black Lantern Power Battery, only to awaken the dormant power of the battery itself as two giant hands rise up from the ground and chase them, seeking flesh. He and Ash do not survive the conflict and are later seen as Black Lanterns.

=== Shilandra Thane ===
Sector 3399; first appeared in Green Lantern Corps Quarterly #1.

=== Shorm ===
Sector 48. He first appeared in Green Lantern Corps: Recharge #1. Shorm is the acting desk sergeant of the Corps and is a close partner of Salaak.

==== Shorm in other media ====
- Shorm makes non-speaking cameo appearances in Green Lantern: First Flight and Green Lantern: Emerald Knights.
- Shorm appears as a character summon in Scribblenauts Unmasked: A DC Comics Adventure.

=== Skirl ===
Sector 2689; first appeared in Green Lantern (vol. 2) #222.

=== Skyrd ===
Sector 3181; first appeared in Tales of the Green Lantern Corps #1.

=== T-Cher ===
The Green Lantern of Sector 1324, T-Cher first appeared in Green Lantern (vol. 2) #167 (August 1983). T-Cher is a robot that had acted as the mechanical caregiver for the children of Green Lantern Brin. After Brin's retirement, the Guardians select T-Cher as his replacement.

=== Thulka Re ===
Little is known about Thulka Re save for the fact that he patrolled Sector 423. During a mission to the recently decimated world of Talcyion Omega, Thulka and his fellow Corpsmen were attacked by an army of powerful snakes known as the Silver Serpents. Thulka sacrificed his life to buy his companions time to escape, and was ultimately killed and consumed by the reptiles. His first and only appearance was in Wonder Woman (vol. 3) #42.

=== Torquemada ===
Torquemada is a powerful sorcerer as well as a Green Lantern. He first appeared in Green Lantern Corps Quarterly #4 (Spring 1993).

In the "Origins and Omens" back-up story in Green Lantern (vol. 4) #38 (March 2009), Torquemada is shown in manacles standing in front of the Guardians next to the sorcerer Mordru and Green Lantern Alan Scott, their fingers stretched out in accusation.

=== T-O-T-U-K ===
A successor of Green Lantern AR-N-O-Q, TO-T-U-K served as a Green Lantern of Sector 1287 for nearly three thousand years until the events of the Crisis on Infinite Earths forced him into retirement. TO-T-U-K had no desire to retire from the Green Lantern Corps and actually preferred to dying in the line of duty. However, it was the will of the Guardians that TO-T-U-K pass his power ring to another. TO-T-U-K was sent to Valstan C5, a planet in the fifth sector of the globular cluster of Sector 1287, where he will find his successor.

Upon arriving in Valstan C5, TO-T-U-K scanned the planet to find a worthy heir but for reasons unknown to him his ring apparently failed to pinpoint his replacement. Initially confused, TO-T-U-K soon realized that the individual he had been looking for was a hive-mind cluster of floating organisms that were floating around him, called the Collective. The Collective, however, was insufficient to become a Green Lantern due to possessing a lower functioning intelligence. But TO-T-U-K learned that the Collective has the ability to absorb the essence of an ensnared lifeform, which would also absorb the personality and intelligence of the lifeform as it was assimilated into the Collective. TO-T-U-K realized that it was possible for the Collective to absorb his power battery and in doing so, each organism of the Collective would become a living power ring. TO-T-U-K allows himself to be absorbed by the Collective, giving the Collective the intelligence and higher reasoning the Collective needed to become a Green Lantern.

=== Tuebeen ===
The Green Lantern of Sector 918, Tuebeen's sole appearance is in Green Lantern (vol. 2) #155 (August 1982).

=== Vath Sarn ===
Vath Sarn first appeared in DC Comics' Green Lantern Corps: Recharge #1 (November 2005), and was created by writers Geoff Johns and Dave Gibbons, and artist Patrick Gleason. The character is from the planet Rann, initially depicted as a veteran soldier of the Rann-Thanagar War, resulting in some tensions between him and his sector partner Isamot Kol, a soldier from Thanagar who was nevertheless more willing to look past their old conflict than Sarn. However, over time, the two move past their war history and become friends; when Sarn loses his legs during the Black Lantern Corps' assault on Oa, Kol has his legs transplanted onto Sarn, reasoning that his physiology will allow him to re-grow his lost limbs and wanting to give his friend the chance to continue his service in the Corps. Later, Vath is part of a small group of Lanterns who, by recruitment and circumstance, assist in taking down the original Guardians, who had gone mad with power.

=== Venizz ===
Sector 2812; first appeared in Green Lantern (vol. 4) #6 (January 2006). Venizz is the partner of Green Lantern Tagort. Noted for her opposition to eugenics.

=== Voz ===
Voz is close to Graf Toren, having been a fellow captive for a long time before Guy Gardner rescued them. Voz is assigned to be the warden of the Sciencells. It is a great honor to him, and he takes it very seriously. Red Lantern Corps member Vice breaks free of his prison with the help of Scar and starts a riot. He breaks free many Sinestro Corps members too and Voz attempts to quell the riot singlehandedly, however Vice easily overpowers him. Voz is badly injured but survives. He appears in a cameo in the Green Lantern live-action film and is also a part of the film toyline.

=== Wissen ===
Sector 1915; First appeared in Tales of the Green Lantern Corps Annual #3 (1987). Wissen used his powers as a Green Lantern to end a thousand-year civil war on the planet Veltre. Wissen is eventually regarded by the natives of Veltre as a god, and under his benevolent rule the planet becomes peaceful but stagnant. After many years as the planet's ruler, a trio of Green Lanterns arrive to stabilize Veltre's core before it explodes like the planet Krypton. At first humbled by his failure, Wissen is persuaded to remain on Veltre to continue to act as its protector.

=== Xax ===
Xax of Xaos is a grasshopper-like alien from a planet ruled by insects. He first appeared in Green Lantern (vol. 2) #9 and becomes one of Hal Jordan's good friends in the Corps. He is killed during a battle on Qward in Crisis on Infinite Earths.

==== Xax in other media ====
- Xax makes non-speaking cameo appearances in Green Lantern: First Flight and Green Lantern: Emerald Knights.
- Xax appears as a character summon in Scribblenauts Unmasked: A DC Comics Adventure.

=== Zale ===
Zale of Bellatrix was Boodikka's replacement on the Bellatrix Bombers, and the next of her kind judged worthy by the Guardians to wield a power ring. She first appeared in Green Lantern Corps #21. As a rookie Lantern who kept ignoring her call to duty, Zale was brought under investigation by her former sister Boodikka, now an Alpha-Lantern. After a lengthy confrontation, it was revealed that it was the Bombers who kept Zale from fulfilling her duties, by deceiving her into thinking she was needed with them. The Guardians punished Zale by making her Boodikka's sector partner and removing her power battery, making her dependent on Boodikka for recharges.

=== Zghithii ===
Sector 3599; first appeared in Green Lantern (vol. 2) #190 (July 1985). Zqhithii is a snake-like alien who helped fellow Green Lantern Xax fight off the Spider Guild invasion of Xaox.

== Miscellaneous Green Lanterns ==
=== Avra ===
Appearing in the animated film Green Lantern: Emerald Knights, voiced by Mitchell Whitfield, Avra was a former scribe for the Guardians and one of the first four Green Lanterns. The discoverer of the green light's capacity to generate constructs, he is considered the first Green Lantern.

=== Blu ===
Appearing in Green Lantern: Emerald Knights, voiced by Gwendoline Yeo, Blu is a blue-skinned humanoid alien and one of the first four Green Lanterns. She died in battle against a massive army, becoming the first Green Lantern to die in the line of duty.

=== Bruce Wayne ===
In the "Elseworlds" title In Darkest Knight, Bruce Wayne succeeded Abin Sur as Green Lantern of Sector 2814. His version of the Lantern uniform is darker than others and includes a cowl and a black scalloped cape. During that same story, Barry Allen / Flash, Superman, and Wonder Woman, were recruited as Green Lantern candidates.

=== Wachet ===
Appearing in the animated film Green Lantern: Emerald Knights, voiced by Jane Singer, Wachet is a semi-translucent alien who was one of the first four chosen as Green Lanterns, and the second to use the full power of her ring following Avra's discovery.

=== Ngila G'rnt ===
First appeared in the Green Lantern live-action film and in the Green Lantern Movie Prequel: Hal Jordan #1 one-shot comic short story "Emerald City", Ngila G'rnt is a native of the planet Inguanzo, and a recently recruited teenaged Green Lantern. She possesses an extraordinary sense of hearing, natural to her race, and is named after the film's costume designer, Ngila Dickson.

=== Tai Pham ===
Appearing in the young adult graphic novels Green Lantern: Legacy (2020) and Green Lantern: Alliance (2022), Tai Pham is the thirteen-year-old grandson of Green Lantern Kim Tran who was selected by her power ring to become its successor. John Stewart, a frequent ally to Tran, became a mentor to Pham.

=== Kim Tran ===
Appearing in the young adult graphic novel Green Lantern: Legacy (2020), Kim Tran became a Green Lantern of Earth around the time of the Vietnam War and was a frequent ally to John Stewart. Her power ring chose her thirteen-year-old grandson Tai Pham as its successor upon her death.

=== Ardakian Trawl ===
Appearing only in Green Lantern: Emerald Knights during the introduction sequence, she is a female Green Lantern who dies after being assaulted by Krona's shadow demons. She is remembered by Ganthet as a brave and gallant Green Lantern.

=== Teen Lanterns ===
==== Frankie, Kelly, Jaclyn, and Samosa ====
Although not "official" members of the Green Lantern Corps, four teenagers — Frankie (male), Kelly (female), Jaclyn (female), and Samosa (male) — are given simplified Green Lantern rings by John Stewart after their homes are abducted to Oa by the Mad Guardian in Green Lantern (vol. 3) (1992) and Mosaic (1992–1993)..

Able to create simple objects, translate languages, synthesize atmosphere, and empower flight, these rings enabled the youngsters to explore Oa in the hopes that their youthful ways of looking at the Mosaic (and the other beings trapped there) would help ease relations between the Earthlings and other races.

Having a moderate degree of success, the four helped where they could until the Mosaic was torn apart when dozens of space fleets appeared over Oa, each planet determined to bring their people home.

Presumably the four are back on Earth readjusting to a "normal" life. At this time, it is unknown how the destruction of the Central Power Battery and subsequent reconstruction by Ion/Kyle Rayner affected the teenagers' rings. It is possible they still exist and can be recharged if given access to a Lantern.

==== Jordana Gardner ====
Another Teen Lantern, unrelated to the others and out-of-continuity, is Jordana Gardner, future descendant of Hal Jordan and Guy Gardner, who appears in Legion of Super Heroes in the 31st Century #6.

=== M'ten ===
Appearing in the Green Lantern: The Animated Series premiere episode "Beware My Power", voiced by Brian George, M'ten is the Green Lantern of an unknown sector and an explorer of the Frontier Space. After the Red Lantern Zilius Zox kills him, M'ten's ring returns to Oa, setting the events of the series in motion.

=== Shyir Rev ===
Appearing in the Green Lantern: The Animated Series episode "Beware My Power", voiced by Kurtwood Smith, Shyir Rev is a Green Lantern assigned to Frontier Space. He sacrificed himself to save his home world from the Red Lanterns.

=== Dulok ===
Appearing in the Green Lantern: The Animated Series episode "Heir Apparent", voiced by Kevin Michael Richardson, Dulok is a Green Lantern from the planet Betrassus. He is killed by Prince Ragnar and his ring given to Queen Iolande.

=== Probert ===
Probert was a mercenary who met up with a few Lanterns and conversed with Guy Gardner at the scene of a huge spaceborne battle. A few of the newer Lanterns pointed out that Probert had once been a Lantern and was described to Guy as having been "worse than you."

=== Monster Menace Green Lantern ===
A Green Lantern from an unnamed planet who leads a team of monstrous-appearing superheroes to Earth in pursuit of Sinestro's duplicate power ring and battery. Initially masquerading as a mysterious robed ghoul, he is a bald humanoid with chalk-white skin, and first appears in Super Friends #10, created by writer E. Nelson Bridwell and artist Ramona Fradon.

=== Kai-Ro ===
Kai-Ro is a character originating from the DC Animated Universe, voiced by Lauren Tom. He is a young Green Lantern and a member of the Justice League in the future of Batman Beyond. The tie-in comic reveals that Kai-Ro previously lived in a Buddhist monastery.

=== Kid Lantern ===
In the miniseries Flash and Green Lantern: The Brave and the Bold (December 2000), Kid Flash temporarily loses his powers to Mirror Master and Black Hand and wields a Green Lantern ring until he recovers them.

=== Daffy Duck/Duck Dodgers ===
In the Duck Dodgers episode "The Green Loontern", Duck Dodgers temporarily becomes a Green Lantern after accidentally taking Hal Jordan's ring. He also appears as the Green Loontern in Lego Batman 3: Beyond Gotham.

=== Green Guardsman ===
The Green Guardsman, a character based on Alan Scott, appears in the Justice League episode "Legends", voiced by William Katt. He is a member of the Justice Guild of America on an alternate Earth who was killed in a nuclear war.

=== Sonya Blade ===
Sonya Blade's ending in the video game Mortal Kombat vs. DC Universe depicts her becoming the Green Lantern of Earthrealm after finding the ring of an unnamed deceased Corps member.

=== Power Ring ===
Power Ring is the name of several DC Comics supervillains –counterparts of Green Lanterns Hal Jordan, Kyle Rayner, and John Stewart. Originally residing on Earth-Three, which was subsequently destroyed during Crisis on Infinite Earths, Power Ring along with the other Syndicators ended up being recreated in the Anti-Matter Universe's Earth.

=== Iron Lantern ===
Iron Lantern is an Amalgam Comics character and combination of Hal Jordan and Iron Man. He first appeared in Showcase of Suspense #1, and was created by writer Kurt Busiek.

Iron Lantern's origin is revealed in Iron Lantern #1. Hal Stark is the millionaire owner of Stark Aviation. While working on a prototype flight simulator, Stark is pulled to the site of a space ship by a beam of green energy. The simulator crashes, badly injuring Stark. The spaceship contains the corpse of an alien named Rhomann Sur (an amalgamation of Marvel's Rhomann Dey and DC's Abin Sur). Stark is able to use parts of the spaceship to build a superpowered suit of armor (powered by Sur's lantern) to keep himself alive. Stark defeats the aliens responsible for Sur's death and decides to fight evil as Iron Lantern.

=== Kyle O'Brien / Green Guardsman ===
Kyle O'Brien / Green Guardsman is an Amalgam Comics character and amalgamation of Kevin O'Brien (Guardsman) and Kyle Rayner.

=== Jade Yifei ===
Based on Jade, Jade Yifei is the Green Lantern of Sector 2814 in the Ame-Comi universe. A teenager from China, she was chosen as the first Green Lantern of Earth in this continuity rather than Hal Jordan.

=== King Kong ===
The Monsterverse incarnation of Kong is among the Titans transported to the DC Universe during the events of the crossover comic book Justice League vs. Godzilla vs. Kong. In issue #7, following the death of Guy Gardner, his ring flies onto Kong's finger, imbuing the Titan with the powers of the Green Lantern. Kong is then able to free himself from the grasp of the resurrected Skull Devil and summon a projection of his axe to aid the Justice League and Godzilla in defeating the monster. The ring leaves Kong after the fight, with Superman then using the Dreamstone to send the Titans back to their own universe.

=== Silver the Hedgehog ===
In DC X Sonic the Hedgehog, a comic crossover between DC and Sega's Sonic the Hedgehog franchise, the Justice League transport Sonic and his friends to their world to save them as they battle Darkseid. While trying to figure out a way back home, Sonic and his friends decide to fill in the League's roles as protectors of their world. Silver receives John Stewart's ring to help the Green Lantern Corps battle Sinestro, who had his Yellow Lantern enhanced by a Chaos Emerald.

== Green Lanterns by sectors of the universe ==
After long experimentation the Guardians equipped and loosely oversaw the Green Lantern Corps, over 7200 diverse beings from throughout the universe. Each was granted a battery and a ring. Thinly scattered among uncounted trillions of stars, each was assigned a sector of space which was vaster than anyone can comprehend.

The sectors are shaped as four-sided pyramid-shaped sections of a sphere, with their point meeting at Oa, which is located at the center of the universe. Oa is technically in each Lantern's sector, thus while on Oa each Lantern is per force still in their home sector.

There are 3600 standard space sectors, plus five "special" sectors: 0 (Oa itself), -1 (Anti-matter universe), 3601 (proscribed sector of space populated by the Manhunters), and the two unnamed "Far" and "Ghost" sectors.

-1	Anti-matter universe of Qward
Not revealed	Liana of M'Elu (expelled)
"Far Sector"	Sojourner Mullein
"Ghost Sector"	Jessica Cruz
0	Oa, home to the Guardians of the Universe, currently Ganthet who renounced Guardianship and became a member of the Green Lantern Corps
2	Hannu
3	Apros
6	Tahr
17	Larvox and Jack T. Chance (deceased)
24	Breeon
26	Norchavivus
28	Umitu
35	Matoo Pree (retired) and Amnee Pree (retired)
38	Kraken and Raker Qarrigat
40	Shorm
47	Lysandra and Spol
53	Yyk
54	Joanqin
55	Jeryll (deceased)
56	Tomy-Fai
68	G'nort
69	Varix
73	Sendrina and Chthos-Chtas Chthatis (deceased)
74	Bloobert Cob (deceased)
83	Bruun
103	Malet Dasim
112	Laira (expelled/deceased)
119	Reemuz (deceased) and Leezle Pon
151	Ghr'll and Xylpth
173	Relok Hag
181	KT21 (deceased)
188	Dkrtzy RRR
257	Markot Five
279	RRU-9-2
281	Alia
282	Quirina Vint
312	Ash-Pak-Glif
315	Volk
345	Olapet
422	Procanon Kaa and Kho Kharhi
424	Vode-M and Graf Toren
488	Arx (deceased)
501	Charqwep
567	Rees-Van
571	Voz
586	Medphyl
650	Ash (deceased)
666	Morro
674	Kilowog
700	R'amey Holl and Von Daggle
773	Saarek (deceased)
786	Ke'Haan (deceased) and Turytt
863	Krista X
885	Horoq Nnot
904	Brik and Aa
911	Rot Lop Fan
916	2-6-8-1-7-9-5
918	Tuebeen
981	Brokk
996	Taa
1006	Nemux (deceased)
1013	Zvvireel (deceased)
1014	Ch'p (deceased), B'dg, and D'ayl
1055	Adam
1110	Okonoko and Sir Deeter
1111	Nhoj Sappal (deceased) and Airam Sappal (deceased)
1122	Gazzl
1132	Remnant Nod (deceased)
1198	Grumb
1234	Rori Stroh
1253	Sheriff Mardin
1287	The Collective
1313	Reever of Xanshi (deceased)
1324	T-Cher
1337	Gk‘d
1355	Penelops
1414	Boodikka and Zale
1416	Diamalon (deceased) and Chaselon
1417	Sinestro (expelled), Katma Tui (deceased), Tarkus Whin (deceased), Myrrt (deceased), Soranik Natu, and Princess Iolande
1418	Salaak
1419	Eddore (deceased)
1582	Lin Canar
1721	Kaylark
1760	Sodam Yat
1776	Meadlux
1915	Wissen
2002	Kreon (deceased)
2106	Krydel-4
2111	Oliversity
2234	El'qa Squa Zreenah and Perdoo
2260	Opto309v
2261	Mogo, Mother Mercy, and Bzzd (deceased)
2277	Zaneth (deceased)
2471	Talmadge
2515	Symon Terrynce
2682	Vath Sarn, Isamot Kol
2684	Quond (deceased) and Tanakata Z (deceased)
2689	Skirl
2751	M'dahna
2812	Robert Taggett
2813	Zharan Pel (deceased), Tomar-Re (deceased), Tomar-Tu, Dalor
2814	Laham (deceased), Waverly Sayre (deceased), Stakaðr (deceased), Abin Sur (deceased), Daniel Young (deceased), Donna Parker (retired), Jade, Rond Vidar, Alan Scott, Hal Jordan, Guy Gardner, John Stewart, Kyle Rayner, Simon Baz, Jessica Cruz
2815	Fentara Rrab (deceased) and Arisia Rrab
2828	Gretti (deceased), Dal Tornan (deceased), and Green Man
2937	Harvid and G'Hu
3009	Stel
3014	Barreer Wot, Lok Neboora and Arkkis Chummuck (deceased)
3100	Amanita
3181	Skyrd
3182	Sodam Yat
3192	Lan Dibbux
3212	Vandor
3319	Charlie Vicker (deceased)
3333	Penn Maricc
3399	Shilandra Thane
3411	Droxelle
3443	Greet
3453	Lashorr
3515	Gpaak
3521	Garmin Vid and Torquemada
3587	Palaqua
3588	Cimfet Tau
3590	Zevonn Parzzx
3599	Zghithii
3601	Location of the Manhunters. Marked as off-limits to Corpsmen.

== See also ==
- Green Lantern
- Green Lantern Corps
- Guardians of the Universe
- Sinestro Corps
- Doctor Spectrum
- Green Lantern (film)
