= Movie Masters =

Toy line by Mattel

- Type: Action figures
- Invented by: DC Comics
- Company: Mattel
- Country: United States
- Availability: 2008–13
- Materials: Plastic
- Features: Popular movie franchises

Movie Masters is an action figure toyline from Mattel based on popular movie franchises, most notably DC Comics. The line has featured characters from the films Superman, Avatar, The Dark Knight trilogy, Green Lantern, and Man of Steel.

Figures in the line were sculpted by Four Horsemen Studios, who also sculpted figures for Mattel's DC Superheroes and DC Universe Classics lines.

== 6" figures ==
=== The Dark Knight ===
In June 2008, these figures were based on the film The Dark Knight and its predecessor Batman Begins.

==== Single carded ====
===== Series 1 =====
- Batman (The Dark Knight suit)
- Batman (The Dark Knight suit, unmasked variant)
- Gotham City Thug
- The Joker

===== Series 2 =====
- Batman (Batman Begins suit)
- Batman (Batman Begins suit, demon variant)
- Scarecrow

===== MattyCollector.com exclusives =====
These figures (with the exception of Joker as Gotham City Thug) were also available at Toys "R" Us beginning in April 2010:

- The Joker as Gotham City Thug
- Survival Suit Bruce Wayne
- Harvey Dent
- The Joker (jail cell version with Missile Launcher)
- Scarecrow (in business suit)
- Batman (night vision)
- Two-Face

==== Multi-Packs (Toys "R" Us exclusives) ====
- Batman Vs. The Joker
- Batman Vs. The Scarecrow
- Survival Suit Bruce Wayne and Jim Gordon
- Batman and Honor Guard Joker

==== Vehicle (Target exclusive) ====
- Bat-Pod

=== Green Lantern ===
These figures were based on the 2011 Green Lantern film starring Ryan Reynolds.

==== Series 1 ====
- Hal Jordan
- Rot Lop Fan
- Tomar-Re

==== Series 1.5 ====
- NautKeLoi

==== Series 2 ====
- Isamot Kol
- Sinestro

==== Series 3 ====
- Krona
- Maskless Hal Jordan with Bzzd

==== Series 4 ====
- Galius Zed
- Hector Hammond

==== Series 5 ====
- Morro, DC comic book character
- Parallax, DC comic book character

==== Exclusive ====
- Green Man

==== Two-Packs ====
- Hal Jordan and Abin Sur
- Hal Jordan and Krona
- Hal Jordan and Tomar-Re
- Sinestro and Hal Jordan

==== SDCC 2011 Exclusive ====
- Kilowog

=== The Dark Knight Rises ===
These figures were based on the 2012 film The Dark Knight Rises. Each figure included a set piece to create the Bat-Signal featured in the series.

==== Single Card ====
- Batman
- Batman w/ blueprints (Kmart exclusive)
- Bane
- Alfred Pennyworth
- Catwoman
- Catwoman w/ goggles down (variant)
- John Blake
- Jim Gordon (Walmart exclusive)
- Ra's al Ghul

==== Two Pack ====
- Batman vs. Bane (Toys R Us)

==== SDCC 2012 Exclusive ====
- Bruce Wayne to Batman

=== The Dark Knight Trilogy ===
- Batman (Batman Begins), Batman (The Dark Knight), and Batman (The Dark Knight Rises) 3-pack (Toys R Us Exclusive)

=== Man of Steel ===
In May 2013, these figures were released based on the film Man of Steel.

==== Series 1 ====
- Superman
- Jor-El
- General Zod

==== Series 2 ====
- Faora
- General Zod (in shackles)
- General Zod (in battle armor)
- Superman (with Kryptonian Key)
- Superman (with Black Suit)

=== Batman v Superman ===
==== Series 1 ====
- Batman
- Superman
- Wonder Woman
- Batman (Armored)

==== Series 2 ====
- Batman (Knightmare Batman)
- Lex Luthor
- Aquaman

== 7" figures ==
These figures were based on the 2009 film Avatar:

== 12" figures ==
These figures were exclusive to MattyCollector.com and were based on the 1978 film Superman and the 1980 film Superman II:

- Superman
- Lex Luthor
- General Zod

These figures were exclusive to MattyCollector.com and were based on the 2011 film Green Lantern:

- Hal Jordan

== Bibliography ==
- Zenker, Gary (2013). Ultimate DC Comics Action Figures and Collectibles Checklist. White Lightning Publishing. ISBN 978-0989334471
