= Green Man (character) =

- Green Man as depicted in Green Lantern Corps: Recharge #2 (December 2005). Art by Patrick Gleason.

Publication information
- Publisher: DC Comics
- First appearance: (I) Green Lantern (vol. 2) #164 (May 1983) (II) Green Lantern Corps: Recharge #1 (November 2005)
- Created by: (I) Todd Klein; Dave Gibbons (II) Geoff Johns; Dave Gibbons; Patrick Gleason

In-story information
- Species: Uxorian
- Place of origin: Uxor
- Team affiliations: Omega Men; Green Lantern Corps
- Abilities: Power Ring; Poisonous blood

Green Man is a character appearing in media published by DC Comics, primarily as a member of the Green Lantern Corps. He first appeared in Green Lantern #164 (vol. 2) in May 1983, and was created by writer Todd Klein and artist Dave Gibbons.

== Fictional character biography ==
Green Man is a member of the Green Lantern Corps, in Space Sector 2828. He originates from the planet of Uxor, and rebelled against its anti-individualism, longing for a personal identity. When the Guardians of the Universe offer him a position as a member of their Green Lantern Corps, Green Man jumps at the chance. As a consequence, Green Man is barred from returning to his home star system due to a pact the Guardians made with the Psions. Green Man enlists the help of the Omega Men to attack the Spider Guild, a spider-like species who live near the Vega system. Green Man is reprimanded by the Guardians, which ultimately leads to him quitting the Green Lantern Corps and joining the Omega Men.

As a member of the Omega Men, Green Man encounters many other beings in his adventures, such as the goddess X'Hal, who lives inside the star Vega; the whale-like Viathans; the Psions; the Tamaraneans; and others. The Green Man is killed by Durlans in the Invasion! storyline when the Omega Men are attacked by a coalition of aliens who are eliminating any opposition, including members of the then-disbanded Green Lantern Corps.

=== Second Green Man ===
Green Man (right), with his partner Stel, from Green Lantern Corps: Recharge #4 (February 2006). Art by Patrick Gleason and Prentis Rollins.

A second Uxorian also known as Green Man is partnered with Stel, as seen in the series Green Lantern Corps: Recharge. Green Man is one of the Lanterns who participate in the defense of Oa against the onslaught of Superboy-Prime in Infinite Crisis. Following the apparent death of Stel, Green Man searches for him and finds Stel badly damaged but functioning. The two retreat to Mogo to ready themselves for the attacking Sinestro Corps.

Following the Sinestro Corps War, the Guardians of the Universe establish the Alpha Lanterns to uphold the laws of the Book of Oa, with Green Man among their membership. In "War of the Green Lanterns", Alpha Lantern Varix kills Green Man and the Alpha Lanterns out of a belief that they have become mentally unstable.

== Powers and abilities ==
Green Man is amphibious and possesses a deadly neurotoxin in his blood which acts as a defense mechanism against predators. After being stripped of his ring and lantern by the Guardians, he demonstrated the ability to produce portals and detect the brainwaves of others in a form of telepathy. After becoming an Alpha Lantern, he is turned into a cyborg, gaining a power battery embedded in his chest that eliminates his need for traditional sustenance. Green Man is also able to drain the energy of power rings.

== Other versions ==
An alternate universe version of Green Man appears in Green Lantern Versus Aliens.

== In other media ==
- Green Man makes a non-speaking cameo appearance in Green Lantern: First Flight.
- Green Man makes a non-speaking cameo appearance in Green Lantern (2011).
- Green Man makes a non-speaking cameo appearance in Justice League Dark: Apokolips War as one of several Green Lanterns killed during Darkseid's attack on Oa.
- Green Man appears as a character summon in Scribblenauts Unmasked: A DC Comics Adventure.
