= Guy Gardner (character) =

DC comics fictional character

- Guy Gardner as Green Lantern as depicted on a pin-up page of Guy Gardner: Warrior #25 (November 1994). Art by Joe Staton.

Publication information
- Publisher: DC Comics
- First appearance: Green Lantern (vol. 2) #59 (March 1968)
- Created by: John Broome; Gil Kane

In-story information
- Full name: Guy Darrin Gardner
- Species: Human/Vuldarian hybrid
- Place of origin: Earth
- Team affiliations: Green Lantern Corps; Justice League; Darkstars; Justice League International; Baltimore Police Department
- Partnerships: Green Lantern partners: John Stewart; Hal Jordan; Jessica Cruz; Kilowog; Kyle Rayner; Other superhero partners: Ice; Fire; Blue Beetle (Jaime Reyes); Blue Beetle (Ted Kord); Booster Gold
- Notable aliases: Green Lantern; Warrior; Red Lantern; Allsight
- Abilities: Expert Combatant; Use of power ring grants: Flight; Force field; Generation of hard-light constructs; Real-time translation of all languages

Guy Darrin Gardner, one of the characters known as Green Lantern, is a superhero appearing in American comic books published by DC Comics, usually in association with the Green Lantern Corps, of which he is a member. Gardner has also been a member of various incarnations of the Justice League.

Gardner has been substantially adapted into media outside comics, primarily in association with the Green Lanterns. James Arnold Taylor, Diedrich Bader, and Troy Baker have voiced the character in animation. Matthew Settle portrayed the character in the television pilot Justice League of America. Nathan Fillion portrays Gardner in the DC Universe.

== Publication history ==
Guy Gardner was created by John Broome and Gil Kane in Green Lantern (vol. 2) #59 (March 1968), although the character was changed significantly in the 1980s by Steve Englehart and Joe Staton who turned him into a jingoistic parody of an ultra-macho "red-blooded American male". This latter version remains the character's archetype to this date. When Englehart started writing, John Stewart was the title character. Englehart initially wondered what stopped multiple Green Lantern characters from being active at the same time. Englehart brought back Hal Jordan and revamped Guy Gardner, whom he thought was "a completely useless character". When Gardner became popular, Englehart regretted not creating a new character because the creative team received no royalties. In 2025, Englehart and Staton were given full credit and royalties for their role in reinventing Guy Gardner ahead of the release of Superman (2025) after Englehart told DC Comics he intended to talk to the press about his past treatment.

Broome and Kane's original design for Guy Gardner was based on actor Martin Milner. His name was allegedly based on frequent letterhack Guy H. Lillian III and Justice League co-creator Gardner Fox. Staton's design for Guy Gardner was based on the character Major Ronald Merrick from the TV series The Jewel in the Crown, as Staton saw Merrick's entitlement and resentment as a parallel to Guy Gardner. Gardner's later blue costume, introduced in the first issue of the character's first ongoing series (cover dated October 1992), was also designed by Staton. During this series, retitled Guy Gardner: Warrior with issue #17, Guy Gardner is gradually evolved into a more vulnerable and heroic character; Beau Smith, who wrote the series for most of its run, was concerned that leaving him as an angry jerk would make the character stagnant and one-note.

== Fictional character biography ==
=== Early life ===
Guy Gardner is raised in Baltimore by his wealthy parents, Roland and Peggy Gardner; the former is an abusive alcoholic. While some of Guy's injuries are visible, others are psychological and deeply impactful. Even though Guy strives to excel in school to earn his father's approval, Roland favors Guy's older brother, Mace. Guy finds solace in reading General Glory comic books, even modeling his bowl haircut after Glory's sidekick, Ernie.

During his teenage years, Guy becomes a juvenile delinquent. He is eventually set on a better path by Mace, who has become a police officer. Guy attends the University of Michigan, where he supports himself and earns bachelor's degrees in education and psychology. While there, he plays football until an injury derails his athletic aspirations, leaving a lasting emotional impact.

After college, Guy works as a social welfare caseworker, focusing on prison inmate rehabilitation. However, he abandons this career, fearing it amplifies his aggressive tendencies. He transitions to teaching children with disabilities, finding a more suitable and fulfilling role.

In The New 52 continuity, Guy's backstory is significantly altered. He is portrayed as a former police officer and the middle child in a family with a long tradition in the Baltimore Police Department. He earns his Green Lantern ring after heroically rescuing his older brother, Gerard, during a police shootout. In this version, Guy has a strained relationship with his father, Ebenezer, a decorated officer forced into early retirement due to injuries sustained in the line of duty. Guy's dismissal from the police force stems from an unexplained incident.

This origin is later retconned in DC Rebirth, which reintroduces Guy's abusive upbringing at the hands of his alcoholic father, Roland Gardner. This is revisited during Guy's present-day fight with the Sinestro Corps member Arkillo and further confirmed when his father is reintroduced under his original name.

=== Green Lantern Corps ===
Guy Gardner's first appearance in Green Lantern #59 (March, 1968).

The Green Lantern of Space Sector 2814, an alien named Abin Sur from the planet Ungara, crash-lands on Earth after being mortally wounded. As Sur dies, his power ring seeks and finds two potential successors: Guy Gardner and Hal Jordan. Jordan is nearer to the crash, so he is chosen over Guy. As a result, Guy is relegated to being a backup should anything happen to Jordan.

When Jordan becomes aware of Gardner's status as his backup, he sets up a chance meeting, and the two become friends. Though Gardner is originally naive to Jordan's secret identity, he eventually assists Jordan during his adventures. He is later partnered with Jordan after training under Kilowog.

During an earthquake, Gardner is hit by a bus while attempting to rescue one of his students. During his recovery, the Guardians recruit John Stewart to be Jordan's new "backup".

Some time later, during a period where Gardner is performing his duties as a backup Green Lantern, Hal Jordan's power battery explodes, trapping Gardner in the Phantom Zone. Jordan and Kari Limbo, Gardner's girlfriend at the time, both believe him to be dead, and the two develop a romantic relationship that ultimately culminates in a marriage proposal. Gardner interrupts the wedding by contacting Limbo telepathically. His previous experiences affect his mind, causing him to sustain brain damage and be rendered comatose for several years. He recovers, but his personality is radically altered, causing him to become arrogant and unstable.

Following Crisis on Infinite Earths, the Guardians and the Zamarons leave the universe to create the next generation of Guardians. Gardner is placed under the care of Appa Ali Apsa on the planet Maltus before escaping. Apsa recaptures Gardner before Jordan bargains with him to let Gardner go.

=== Justice League International ===
Soon after obtaining his freedom from Maltus, Gardner becomes a founding member of the Justice League International after the original JLA disbands in the 1986–87 storyline "Legends". In his time with the JLI, Gardner resents Batman's leadership of the group, going so far as to challenge the Dark Knight to a fist fight. Batman downs Guy with one punch after Guy takes off his ring. The other members leave him lying on the floor. When Guy wakes up, he bangs his head on a console and knocks himself out. When he comes to, his personality has changed to kind and gentle. Until he hits his head again at a later point, Guy is kind, sweet, boyishly innocent, and a perfect gentleman to the female members of the group. Guy's run in JLI is full of constant personality shifts and endless arguing between team members. This leads to a fight with Lobo, the sucker-punching of Blue Beetle during a boxing match, and finally him quitting the team after being "belittled" by Superman.

Gardner is romantically involved with his fellow Leaguer Ice, even learning some rudimentary Norwegian, but he is often callous to her and slow to admit his feelings. Their relationship ends with her death at the hands of the Overmaster.

=== Guy Gardner: Reborn ===
Guy Gardner with his yellow power ring

After completing his assignment of recruiting new Corps members, Jordan returns to Earth to reclaim his title as Green Lantern of Sector 2814. Gardner's response is to challenge Jordan to a fight where the loser would quit the Corps. Gardner loses and surrenders his ring. After some failed run-ins with Goldface and Black Hand as a non-powered vigilante, he sets out on a quest to regain his power and identity. Tricking Lobo into assisting him, he invades Qward to find the yellow power ring of Sinestro, but is told by the Qwardians that the ring is unique and never returned to Qward. He then travels to Oa and finds it on Sinestro's hand in the Crypt of the Green Lantern Corps.

Gardner's own comic series begins with him using the yellow ring and a modified costume similar to his Green Lantern costume but from street clothes. The yellow ring does not use a battery to recharge. It needs to be used against the rings of Green Lanterns so it can absorb their residual energy to restore its power. Gardner discovers this by accident when Kilowog uses his own ring to scan Gardner's.

Guy Gardner returns to Earth to pick a fight with Superman but eventually rejoins the Justice League and helps battle the monster Doomsday. Guy and his teammates are brutally beaten, and Superman is killed during the creature's defeat. During the "Reign of the Supermen" storyline, when four different versions of Superman appear after his death, Guy fights, becomes allies with and later endorses the Last Son of Krypton Superman, who is actually the Eradicator. Later, Guy clears his name of murder that is committed by his Draalian clone "Joe Gardner" and learns that his brother Mace has become the assassin Militia. After a brawl between the two, Guy decides to take the codename Warrior.

=== Guy Gardner: Warrior ===
By this time, the power of Guy's ring begins to fluctuate due to the meddling of the villain Parallax (Hal Jordan). Deprived of his powers, Guy wears a golden exosuit provided by Blue Beetle which simulates superhuman strength. Guy is not happy with this initial suit as it does not feel as natural as using a power ring. The exosuit first appears in issue 18, the second issue to feature the new title of Guy Gardner: Warrior. Although the exosuit is destroyed during combat with Militia in issue 19, Guy's power ring provides him with a new exosuit constructed of ring energy. This is much more to Guy's liking.

After the destruction of his hometown, a grief-stricken and power-hungry Hal Jordan destroys the Green Lantern Corps. Guy starts having visions of Oa's destruction and his power starts to mysteriously increase, he leads a group of heroes to Oa to find out what happened to the Corps. Guy and his team are ambushed and quickly defeated by Parallax. Guy manages to trick Hal into thinking that he is dead by simulating a ring powered construct of himself that was impaled by an energy pike. Guy uses the element of surprise and manages to evenly match Hal in a fight for a few minutes. Eventually Hal gains the upper hand, defeats Gardner and destroys his ring. Parallax then punches out one of Gardner's eyes and sends him and his team back to Earth. Guy awakes in the hospital after spending three weeks in a coma. Deprived again of his power ring, he is forced to find an alternate means of acquiring power.

Ganthet first comes to Guy Gardner to offer him the last Green Lantern power ring. When Gardner refuses, Ganthet decides to entrust it to Kyle Rayner.

Guy Gardner as Warrior, as depicted in Guy Gardner: Warrior #44 (September 1995). Art by Phil Jimenez.

Guy joins up with the Doc Savage analogue Buck Wargo and his globe-trotting Monster Hunters, which features obscure Silver Age hero Tiger-Man (Desmond Farr) along with Joey Hong and Rita Muldoon. On an expedition to the Amazon, Gardner finds and drinks from the chalice of the Warrior Water. This activates alien DNA that was implanted in his bloodline a millennium ago by the Vuldarians, a space-traveling race. He discovers new, shapeshifting abilities that writer Beau Smith claims were editorially mandated to capitalize on the success of Mighty Morphin Power Rangers, and which would allow him to resume his role as a superhero. When Guy first emerges, his body assumes the shape of his old exosuit, albeit red instead of gold, and his lost eye is restored. Guy's body remains that way until the end of the Zero Hour storyline. He morphs weapons directly out of his arms as of Zero Hour issue #2.

Gardner opens a superhero theme bar called Warriors, as both a source of income and a base between his adventures. He is joined by Buck's group, Veronna, mightiest of the Nabba Jungle tribe of women, who guards the Warrior Water and believes she is destined as Guy's mate, and those who are brought on as bouncers for Warriors but act as fellow adventurers: Lady Blackhawk (displaced in time by Zero Hour: Crisis in Time!), Wildcat, Lead, and Arisia Rrab.

His early days as Warrior see him struggling with his newfound powers. He has difficulty changing his body into any weapon, and his transformations often cause him pain. After a breakdown that leads to a confrontation with Superman and Supergirl, with some soul-searching help from his supposed ancestor Cardone, Gardner is finally able to use his new powers to form most non-energy-based weapons from his body, as well as absorb some forms of energy and redirect them through his various "weapons". Another ability, his capability to use the knowledge of warriors from across space and time, is rarely used and mostly forgotten. Guy has many enemies during the series including Evil Star, Gorilla Grodd, Black Serpent, Sledge, Major Force, Martika the Seductress, Bronkk and the Tormocks (ancient nemeses to the Vuldarians), Mudakka, and Dementor as well as the return of his clone Joe Gardner (now going by the name Enforcer), the Quorum, and his brother Militia with girlfriend Honey. He teams with many heroes including Steel, with whom he becomes close friends. Gardner also becomes good friends with Lobo after the defeat of the Tormocks.

During the time that Gardner fights against Dementor, he learns that his enemy is also a product of Vuldarian breeding. Dementor's father raped a Vuldarian woman. Dementor is sent to Hell, where he reveals that he is the one responsible for Gardner's constant personality shifts (in a sense, explaining why his personality changed drastically over the years). However, this new direction only lasts for 30 issues of Guy Gardner: Warrior (which crosses over in the Way of the Warrior with Justice League America and Hawkman and later a crossover with Kyle Rayner's Green Lantern book) In the last issues, Gardner finally deals with his "family", as well as revealing another side of his Vuldarian powers, the ability to heal mortal wounds.

Over the course of the series, Gardner makes peace with a great deal of his past. On one Christmas, the Spectre, on behalf of the Phantom Stranger, makes it possible for Guy to communicate with his deceased father, who apologizes for the abuse, both physical and mental, he placed upon Guy, his brother Mace, and their mother. He reveals how proud he is of all the accomplishments Guy achieved as a man and the pair reconcile. Afterward, Guy gives his condolences to Ice's mother over their shared loss of her daughter and she provides him an ice sculpture to remind him of her daughter. A celebration held at Warriors for the holiday sees Guy cross paths with an inebriated Fire. The pair shares a kiss after expressing how much they miss Ice. It is suggested they sleep together after this.

After the Warrior series is canceled, Gardner continues to appear in the DC Universe; most notably as a recurring character in the Green Lantern series during Kyle Rayner's run and a reserve member of the JLA. He seems to be killed during the Our Worlds at War crossover. He is later discovered to be trapped in a pocket of Hell called the Gorge in Pokolistan. After freeing himself by switching places with Superman villain Kancer as ruler of the Gorge, his Warrior powers are apparently enhanced. He declares it his job to do less ethical things that heroes like Superman cannot.

In the JLA: Classified-based miniseries I Can't Believe It's Not the Justice League, Guy assists the Super Buddies and is revealed to have another yellow ring.

=== Return to the Corps ===
During the 2005 miniseries Green Lantern: Rebirth, Gardner's Vuldarian DNA is overwritten by his human DNA when Parallax possesses Gardner and several Green Lanterns. Hal Jordan's ring splits in two and Gardner's ring is restored to him. Eventually, Parallax is defeated by the combined effort of all five active Green Lanterns, including Gardner. The Guardians then select Gardner as one of the senior officers of the new Green Lantern Corps.

In the 2005–2006 miniseries Green Lantern Corps: Recharge (written by Dave Gibbons), the Guardians assign Gardner to be one of the Corps' three main instructors, along with Kilowog and Kyle Rayner. The trio is responsible for the training of the new Corps, to which the Guardians intend to name 7,200 members. Gardner is not at all appreciative of his new role. When he complains to the Guardians, they tell him that success in training new recruits could lead to him being given a new position.

Gardner plays a significant role in defeating the Spider Guild attack on Oa. Discovering that trainee Soranik Natu has disappeared into the forbidden Vega star system, which the Guardians' pact with the Psions forbids Green Lanterns from entering, Gardner and Kyle Rayner led a rescue mission in direct violation of Oan policy. Once there, the Lanterns discover the Spider Guild nest and determine that its next target is the Oan sun. Returning just as the attack commences, Gardner gathers the frightened trainee Green Lanterns and rallies them with a speech that impresses even his longtime rival, Hal Jordan. Gardner's performance in repelling the attack results in his promotion to Lantern #1 of the Green Lantern Honor Guard, a position of authority over other Lanterns. In this new role, Gardner is expected to "think outside the box" and "do the jobs other Lanterns cannot", a function well-suited to his irascible personality.

=== "Infinite Crisis" and "One Year Later" ===
In his new role as Lantern #1, Guy leads the Corps in the defense of Oa against Superboy-Prime, creating a wall of energy to slow the rampaging teen and calling a "Code 54", authorizing the use of extreme force. Guy supervises the final capture and imprisonment of Superboy-Prime, locking him in a red Sun-Eater provided by Donna Troy and organizing a constant watch of fifty Lanterns to keep him imprisoned.

Guy spends the entire "missing year" following Infinite Crisis doing missions for the Guardians without shore leave (though he is infrequently seen on Earth in the 52 weekly limited series, it should be assumed he has sneaked away from the Guardians' watch). When he is finally granted some time off one year later, his relaxation is cut short by an attack by a grudge-holding Bolphunga. Soon after, Guy assisted Hal Jordan on an unsanctioned mission to the Manhunter homeworld, Biot. Through Hal and Guy's efforts, several long-lost and believed deceased lanterns (including Arisia, Chaselon, Jack T. Chance, Graf Toren, Hannu, Ke'Haan, Laira, and Boodikka) were freed from imprisonment by the Cyborg Superman. Upon returning from the mission, Guy was punished by the Guardians and forced to endure one month as one of the fifty Lanterns on "Prime Duty". Lanterns of the Honor Guard, like Guy, are allowed to break the rules three times before expulsion.

According to Green Lantern writer Geoff Johns in a 2006 Newsarama interview, Prime would not be escaping under Guy's watch: "Not at all. That's ridiculous. Anyone who's read Guy Gardner for the last two years in Green Lantern or in Green Lantern Corps knows that he's a much better, stronger character than that. And even in the old Giffen stuff, he would probably break some rules, taunt the other heroes, and drink a beer or two, but he would not be that much of an idiot. He was never that much of an idiot, and certainly not with what I'm doing with him, or with what Dave Gibbons is doing with him in Corps. He has his moments, and he's a really fun character, but he's definitely not going to be a moron. His role is not DCU Moron. His role is DCU Shitkicker".

=== The Corpse ===
Guy is briefly part of the Corps' Black Ops division. Dubbed "The Corpse", members forsake their rings for stealthier powers provided by the Guardians. Guy takes part in one mission with this secretive unit. He is tasked with locating Von Daggle, a Durlan who was formerly in charge of the Corpse. Gardner relays a message from the Guardians, informing Daggle that he was reinstated. From there, Daggle takes command of Gardner, leading him to the homeworld of the Dominators, aliens with a grudge against Earth. Together, they defeat a super-evolved Dominator, though the Corpse's use of lethal force does not sit well with Guy. Gardner informs Daggle that he cannot be a part of his crew and Daggle wipes his memory, musing that "humans never make the cut".

=== "Sinestro Corps War" ===
In the "Sinestro Corps War" storyline, Superboy-Prime and Cyborg Superman escape imprisonment when the Sinestro Corps attacks Oa, killing the guards on Prime Duty. Guy, along with fellow Green Lanterns Hal Jordan and John Stewart, are captured by Parallax during battle and brought to Qward. Guy and Stewart are then held prisoner by Lyssa Drak, who forces them to relive tragedies in their lives. Hal manages to defeat Lyssa and free Guy and John from their nightmare. In the skirmish following their escape, Parallax nearly breaks Gardner's neck. Upon returning to their universe, they defend Earth from the entire Sinestro Corps. After helping to free Kyle from Parallax's possession, Parallax is split into four pieces by former Guardians Ganthet and Sayd, and placed into the power batteries of Hal, John, Guy, and Kyle. Guy is infected by the Sinestro Corps' deadly alien virus named Despotellis, but cured by the Green Lantern Corps' own sentient smallpox virus, Leezle Pon.

=== Return of Ice ===
Within the aftermath of the Sinestro Corps War, Guy is finally reunited with former girlfriend Ice, recently resurrected. Despite Ice's uncertainty as to the wisdom of reviving the old romance, Guy's professions of adoration seem sufficient to convince her to meet him for a proper date on the same spot exactly one month later. Before leaving Earth to open a bar/restaurant on Oa, Guy leaves Ice a note. She declines his proposal to cohabit on Oa, and Guy reads her desire to rebuild a new life on Earth with her best friend Beatriz as an attempt to distance from him, accusing Beatriz of pitting Ice against him. The two agree that their current situations will make a relationship impossible.

=== "Blackest Night" ===
In the "Blackest Night" storyline, Guy and Kyle Rayner are opposed to the Guardians' decision to execute all Sinestro Corps members and all other prisoners and attempt unsuccessfully to convince the Alpha Lanterns and the Guardians themselves to stay away from the dark path on which they are headed, and are reassigned to Earth. They later try to return to Oa, and fail to repel an invasion of a swarm of black rings to Oa's Lantern crypt, where the corpses of fallen Lanterns are reanimated as Black Lanterns.

After Kyle is killed in the explosion of Chaselon's power battery, Guy flies into a rage and is transformed into a Red Lantern. Now powered by both of his green and red power rings, Guy seeks vengeance against the Black Lanterns and is able to destroy them on sight effortlessly with his combined weapons. Despite Kyle's resurrection at the hands of Star Sapphire Miri Riam, Guy turns his rage on his former friends, before Mogo purges the Red Lantern rage from him, though he is told only a Blue Lantern can cure him completely. He then joins the battle against Nekron on Earth.

=== Green Lantern: Emerald Warriors ===
After the events of Blackest Night, Guy Gardner stars in the monthly series Emerald Warriors, written by Peter Tomasi. While searching for a cure for his Red Lantern rage, it is revealed that Guy entered into an alliance with Red Lantern leader Atrocitus. This briefly alienates Guy from Kilowog and Arisia.

In the "War of the Green Lanterns" storyline, the influence of Parallax, now restored to the Central Power Battery, forces Guy and the other Earth Lanterns to use the rings of other Corps. Guy, citing his experience with the Red Lanterns, chooses the red power ring. During their conflict with the Green Lantern Corps, Guy and his allies release Parallax from the Central Power Battery, Guy using the Star Sapphire ring in conjunction with the Red Lantern ring, drawing on his love of the Corps and his hatred and his anger to power both rings at once, the two emotional extremes proving sufficient to release Parallax from the battery. Guy is subsequently cleansed of the Red Lantern energy by Kyle Rayner's blue ring before each reclaims his usual ring.

=== The New 52 ===
Guy Gardner as a Red Lantern in The New 52, as depicted in Red Lanterns #34 (2014)

Gardner, John Stewart, and an elite Green Lantern Strike Team star in a relaunched Green Lantern Corps series, which debuted in September 2011 as part of DC's The New 52 relaunch. This series debuted with Peter Tomasi and art by Fernando Pasarin and Scott Hanna. Guy is also shown on the cover for the new Justice League International series that was released that same month, written by Dan Jurgens and with art by Aaron Lopresti. Initially, Guy appears to be the one Earth Green Lantern that the Guardians still appear to rely on, what with Hal having been expelled after War of the Green Lanterns, Kyle being expelled due to his alliance with the other ring-wielders, and John being put on trial for killing another Lantern. However, the Guardians really plan to undermine all four Earth Lanterns by sabotaging Guy's career after building it up, ensuring a precipitous fall.

This plan begins when the Guardians promote Guy to the role of 'Sentinel Lantern' and entrust him with guarding a group of ambassadors traveling to a planet for a crucial conference. They subsequently release Guy's old enemy Xar from the Science cells and create the impression that he is going after Guy's family on Earth. They predicted that Guy would abandon his duty and return to Earth while Xar attacks the ambassadors. With the rest of his team having been absorbed by the Third Army, Guy escapes only through his strength of will, averting the Third Army's attempt to 'recruit' him. With Xar having killed the ambassadors, the Guardians order Guy to resign from the Corps to redeem the damage he has done.

Feeling depressed after a phone conversation with his family, during which his father dismisses superheroes as overly reliant on their powers, Guy attempts to spend the night fighting crime with only his natural skills. This backfires when he interrupts a police sting operation, culminating in him being arrested by his sister. While in prison, he is attacked by the Third Army, but is rescued by Green Lanterns Simon Baz and B'dg, who send the civilians to safety before crushing the Third Army and retreating to the Sea of Tranquility on the moon. Guy is angered when he discovers that the Guardians have turned against him and the Corps. Simon and B'dg dispatch him to the planet Oa. There, Guy reclaims his ring and joins Kilowog and the others reserve Corps members in their rebellion against the treacherous Guardians.

After the villainous First Lantern is destroyed and the unemotional Guardians are killed by Sinestro, Guy and Kilowog locate where Salaak was imprisoned by the Guardians and free him. Guy is angered when he discovers Salaak's surveillance footage of Xar being released by the Guardians. Salaak helps him locate Xar's whereabouts, and discovers that Xar is located on Earth and preparing to kill off Guy's family. Guy manages to speed up with Saint Walker's willing assistance to arrive in time to blast Xar to be incinerated, and reunites with his family.

Following the event, Guy is placed in the cast of the Red Lanterns series where he is sent by Hal Jordan to join the Red Lanterns undercover. He defeats Atrocitus and takes command of the group. It is revealed that part of his decision to join with the Red Lanterns is feeling as if he has never fit in as a Green Lantern. As a Red Lantern Gardner manages to keep his rage in check, successfully leading most of the Red Lanterns; Atrocitus leads a splinter group and allows new Red rings to cause murderous justice-based rampages to continue. After joining with the Green Lanterns to defeat the cosmic terrorist Relic, Hal promises to give the Red Lanterns a sector for them to watch over, unwittingly this sector becomes Sector 2814, where Earth resides, giving guardianship of Earth to the Red Lantern Corps. Guy also tries to reunite with Ice but she has undergone several personal revelations of her own and needs time apart; Guy promises to give her just that.

The relationship with Ice is revisited in the 2021–2023 DC Black Label series The Human Target. Gardner is depicted as an obsessive stalker, enraged by Ice's romance with Christopher Chance, who is dying from a poison meant for Lex Luthor. In issue 6 of the series, in what has been described as "one of the most startling things your reviewer has ever witnessed in a superhero comic", Ice freezes Gardner and Chance smashes Gardner's frozen body into chunks. The series' final issues reveal that Gardner faked his death at Ice's request as part of a plot to cover up the true nature of Chance's poisoning.

=== DC K.O. ===
Guy Gardner is among the 32 combatants in the DC K.O. storyline, where heroes compete to gain the power to confront Darkseid. During his fight with the Flash, Guy temporarily retakes his Red Lantern and Warrior identities, an ability given to all participants of the tournament to use powers and appearances from their past. Following the tournament, Guy is empowered with Alpha energy and gains the ability to see the emotional entities that power the Lantern Corps. As a result, Guy becomes worshipped on Oa as the Allsight and is tasked with tracking down the entities following their rebirth.

== Powers and abilities ==
=== Power rings ===
Guy Gardner is trained to use a Green Lantern power ring, which is only limited by the user's willpower. He later acquires Sinestro's Qwardian power ring, which is later revealed to be based on the bearer's control of fear. This early version of a yellow ring is powered by absorbing plasma radiation expelled from a Green Lantern ring. It seems to make Guy more invulnerable than a normal Green Lantern. He uses both for basic Lantern abilities including constructs, flight, and energy projection, though it also causes him some difficulty on occasion. For example, if he asks it a question he will get an answer in Qwardian, which he does not speak. In Green Lantern: Rebirth #6 it is mentioned that Guy Gardner's ring is constantly sparking with energy, as if unable to contain the power of his will. Following Kyle Rayner's apparent death, Guy's rage causes a red power ring to latch onto him, bestowing on him the ability to generate napalm like flames that will burn even in space. Unlike most Red Lanterns, Guy retains his intelligence, and, like Hal Jordan when he was under the thrall of a red ring, Guy is able to shape the red flames into solid constructs. Unlike Hal, Guy's green ring remains active, allowing him to combine the two lights and obliterate the Black Lanterns. Guy is also the first male character seen to wield a love-powered Star Sapphire ring, wearing it in conjunction with the Red Lantern ring (he states that the result feels like he has blood and sugar in his mouth). During the events of the Green Lanterns: The Lost Army, Guy creates a new uniform using both his green and red rings. Later during the final battle, the Power Converters used by Lightsmiths convert Guy's Red Lantern Ring to a Green Lantern ring, thus ending his connection to the Red Lantern Corps. Lastly, a Blue Lantern Ring comes to Guy.

=== Vuldarian powers ===
Guy's Vuldarian powers include limited shapeshifting abilities which allow him to create weapons out of his body like blades and energy guns, shielding, armor or equipment which he has total control over. At first, these transformations cause him pain and he is unable to shrink from his 7-foot height. He maintains super strength, stamina, and durability around Superman's strata, the power of flight, capable of surviving in outer space unassisted, accelerated healing, and has access to the memories of deceased Vuldarians (touted as the most dangerous warriors in the history of the universe). Trained by the Vuldarian Cardone, Gardner becomes highly skilled in using his abilities and practices extensively in the martial arts. During the return of Parallax, he suffers a metahuman power discharge and his Vuldarian abilities go into recession. Coincidentally, when he awakes, he is near Hal Jordan's power ring, which has the ability to duplicate itself. Gardner once more has a power ring, and following the return of the Guardians of the Universe, he is once again a Green Lantern.

=== Green Lantern (Tangent Comics) ===
Guy becomes the caretaker of a mystical artifact that survives the events of the 2005 "Infinite Crisis" storyline, after it is discovered on New Earth by Kyle Rayner. It has the power to temporarily awaken the dead and has also served as a dimensional gateway. The Guardians eventually use the artifact for a ritual to merge the entity Ion with Sodam Yat during the Sinestro Corps War.

== Other versions ==
Several alternate versions of Guy Gardner have appeared throughout the character's publication history.

- In Legends of the Dead Earth, Gardner retained his Vuldarian abilities and outlived the Earth.
- In The New 52: Futures End, Gardner became a Blue Lantern.
- In Absolute Green Lantern, Gardner is the sheriff of Evergreen, Nevada and received the power of the Red Flame of Restraint from Abin Sur.

== In other media ==
=== Television ===
Guy Gardner as he appears in Batman: The Brave and the Bold

- Guy Gardner / Green Lantern appears in Justice League of America, portrayed by Matthew Settle.
- Guy Gardner / Green Lantern makes a non-speaking appearance in the Duck Dodgers episode "The Green Loontern".
- Guy Gardner / Green Lantern appears in Batman: The Brave and the Bold, voiced by James Arnold Taylor. This version is a founding member of Justice League International.
- Guy Gardner / Green Lantern appears in Young Justice, voiced by Troy Baker. This version speaks with a Maryland accent and is initially an associate of the Justice League who both Hal Jordan and John Stewart do not want among their ranks. Despite this, Gardner eventually joins the League in the second season.
- Guy Gardner / Green Lantern appears in Green Lantern: The Animated Series, voiced by Diedrich Bader. This version was chosen to replace Hal Jordan as the Green Lantern of Sector 2814 while he was away in space. Upon Jordan's return to Earth, the two initially clash before reconciling and becoming friends. Gardner is later chosen to join the Green Lantern Corps' Honor Guard.
- Guy Gardner / Green Lantern was going to appear in an untitled Green Lantern series, portrayed by Finn Wittrock, until the series was reworked into Lanterns (see below).

=== Film ===
- In an early script for Green Lantern (2011), Gardner was set to make a cameo appearance as a football player and potential candidate of Abin Sur's power ring before it went to Hal Jordan. However, the scene was cut from the final version.
- Guy Gardner / Green Lantern and his Bizarro League counterpart, Greenzarro, appear in Lego DC Comics Super Heroes: Justice League vs. Bizarro League, voiced again by Diedrich Bader.
- A statue of Guy Gardner appears in Justice League vs. the Fatal Five.
- The Red Son incarnation of Guy Gardner appears in Superman: Red Son, voiced by Travis Willingham.
- Guy Gardner / Green Lantern makes a non-speaking appearance in Justice League Dark: Apokolips War as a defender of Oa before he is killed by Darkseid.
- Guy Gardner / Green Lantern makes a non-speaking appearance in Justice League: Crisis on Infinite Earths.

=== DC Universe ===
Guy Gardner appears in media set in the DC Universe, portrayed by Nathan Fillion. This version is the pompous self-appointed leader of Maxwell Lord's corporate-sponsored "Justice Gang". Introduced in Superman (2025), Gardner appears in the Peacemaker (2025) episode "The Ties That Grind" and the television series Lanterns (2026). Gardner will appear in the film Man of Tomorrow (2027) and the series Mister Miracle.

=== Video games ===
- Guy Gardner / Green Lantern appears as a playable character in Batman: The Brave and the Bold – The Videogame, voiced again by James Arnold Taylor.
- Guy Gardner / Green Lantern appears as a boss in DC Universe Online, voiced by Joey Hood.
- Guy Gardner as a Green and Red Lantern and a Star Sapphire appears as a character summon in Scribblenauts Unmasked: A DC Comics Adventure.
- Guy Gardner / Green Lantern appears as a downloadable playable character in Lego Batman 3: Beyond Gotham.

=== Merchandise ===
- Guy Gardner as a Green and Red Lantern received figures in the DC Direct toy line.
- Guy Gardner / Green Lantern received figures in Mattel's "DC Universe Infinite Heroes" toy line.
- Guy Gardner / Green Lantern received a figure in the DC Universe Classics line.
- Guy Gardner / Green Lantern received a figure in Mattel's "DC Retro-Action Super-Heroes" toy line.

=== Miscellaneous ===
- Guy Gardner appears in Justice League Unlimited #32.
- Guy Gardner appears in Green Lantern: Movie Prequel: Hal Jordan #1 as a potential candidate of Abin Sur's power ring before it chooses Hal Jordan.
- Guy Gardner / Green Lantern appears in the Injustice: Gods Among Us prequel comic. While investigating Kyle Rayner's disappearance, Gardner and Ganthet confront Superman upon learning of his growing tyranny. Ganthet returns to Oa with Hal Jordan, though Gardner stays behind to watch over Earth before leaving upon learning Superman allied himself with the Sinestro Corps. Over the course of the next seven months, Gardner builds an army of Green Lanterns to combat Superman and returns to reason with him, but a war breaks out. Gardner later confronts Jordan over him allying with Superman and being manipulated by Sinestro. Sometime later, Jordan confronts Gardner, believing he killed John Stewart. In the ensuing fight, Jordan kills Gardner and later becomes a Yellow Lantern.
- Guy Gardner's spirit appears in the Injustice 2 prequel comic, haunting Hal Jordan until he reassumes his Green Lantern powers.
- Gardner appears in DC x Sonic the Hedgehog.
