= Soranik Natu =

- Soranik Natu as depicted in Green Lantern/Sinestro Corps Secret Files #1 (December 2007). Art by Patrick Gleason.

Publication information
- Publisher: DC Comics
- First appearance: Green Lantern Corps: Recharge #1 (November 2005)
- Created by: Geoff Johns; Dave Gibbons; Patrick Gleason

In-story information
- Full name: Soranik Natu
- Species: Korugarian
- Place of origin: Korugar
- Team affiliations: Green Lantern Corps; Sinestro Corps
- Partnerships: Kyle Rayner
- Notable aliases: Parallax
- Abilities: Power Ring: Flight; Force field; Generation of hard-light constructs; Real-time translation of all languages

Soranik Natu is a fictional character, current leader of the Sinestro Corps, and a former member of the Green Lantern Corps in the DC Comics Universe. She first appears in Green Lantern Corps: Recharge #1 (November 2005), and was created by writers Geoff Johns, Dave Gibbons, and artist Patrick Gleason.

Soranik is an extraterrestrial from the planet Korugar, and a Green Lantern successor of Katma Tui. She has been revealed as a daughter of the villain Sinestro, and her mother is Sinestro's late wife Arin Sur, which makes her the niece of Hal Jordan's predecessor Abin Sur. Soranik was also the love interest of Green Lantern Kyle Rayner before ending the relationship after uncovering his continued affections for his deceased former love interest Jade.

== Fictional character biography ==
=== Pre-Green Lantern background ===
Soranik Natu is a Korugarian, a humanoid alien originating from the planet Korugar. A neurosurgeon, Soranik views the Green Lantern Corps and everything associated with them as a symbol of oppression due to the actions of Korugarian Lantern Sinestro, who rebelled against the Green Lanterns and used his power to conquer Korugar.

In the "Emerald Twilight" storyline, Hal Jordan is possessed by Parallax and kills most of the Green Lantern Corps before they are resurrected by Kyle Rayner. The Guardians of the Universe set out to repopulate the ranks of the Corps, with Soranik Natu being selected as a Green Lantern and eventually overcoming her hatred of the group.

=== "One Year Later" ===
As of the "One Year Later" timeframe, Soranik has completed her training and become an active member of the Corps. After seeking advice from Mogo, she elects to return to Korugar and continue her work as a surgeon along with her Green Lantern duties. After using her power ring in surgery, Soranik is forbidden to practice medicine and evicted from her home. She begins serving the poor underclass of Korugar.

=== "Sinestro Corps War" ===
During the "Sinestro Corps War" storyline, Sinestro returns to Korugar and confronts Soranik Natu. Sinestro defeats her but spares her life; wishing to keep his people safe, he calculates that leaving will convince the people of Korugar that Soranik defeated him. Sinestro returns to Qward to join the battle occurring there. The deception works, and Soranik receives the trust and acclaim denied to her by her own people.

=== Parentage ===
During the "Emerald Eclipse" storyline, Sinestro reveals to Soranik Natu that he is her biological father and allowed her to be adopted by Karoll and Dgibb Natu for her safety. Additionally, Sinestro implanted a transmitter under Soranik's left eye shaped like his family's coat of arms that enables him to track her.

Soranik Natu as a Yellow Lantern, on the cover of Hal Jordan and the Green Lantern Corps #25 (July 2017). Art by Ethan Van Sciver.

=== The New 52 and DC Rebirth ===
During DC's 2011 reboot of its entry monthlyu comics line, The New 52, Soranik Natu remains a Green Lantern throughout the "Rise of the Third Army" and "Wrath of the First Lantern" storylines. Shortly after the events of "Forever Evil", Soranik is captured by the Sinestro Corps and made a Yellow Lantern.

Soranik Natu becomes the leader of the Sinestro Corps and forges an alliance and partnership with the Green Lantern Corps. However, the alliance falls apart after the death of Sarko, a villain from the future who is revealed to be the future son of Soranik and Kyle Rayner.

== Reception ==
Soranik Natu has been called "one of the most interesting new members of the Green Lantern Corps" due to being both a Green Lantern and a doctor, and she has been the subject of analysis of potential conflicts between the Green Lantern oath and the Hippocratic Oath.

== In other media ==
=== Television ===
Soranik Natu appears in the Young Justice episode "Rescue and Search", voiced by Vanessa Marshall.

=== Video games ===
Soranik Natu appears as a character summon in Scribblenauts Unmasked: A DC Comics Adventure.

=== Miscellaneous ===
- Soranik Natu appears in Smallville Season 11.
- Soranik Natu appears in issue #16 of DC Universe Online: Legends.
- Soranik Natu appears in the Injustice 2 prequel comic as the warden of the planet Harring and estranged daughter of Sinestro.
