= Katma Tui =

- Katma Tui as depicted on the cover of Green Lantern #127 (April 1980); Art by Brian Bolland

Publication information
- Publisher: DC Comics
- First appearance: Green Lantern vol. 2 #30 (July 1964)
- Created by: John Broome; Gil Kane

In-story information
- Full name: Katma Tui Stewart
- Species: Korugarian
- Place of origin: Korugar
- Team affiliations: Green Lantern Corps; Black Lantern Corps
- Notable aliases: Green Lantern
- Abilities: Power Ring

Katma Tui is a comic book superhero, an extraterrestrial from the planet Korugar, and a member of the intergalactic police force known as the Green Lantern Corps. She is the Green Lantern successor of the supervillain Sinestro and the predecessor of Sinestro's daughter, Soranik Natu.

Katma Tui has made limited appearances in other media, primarily in association with the Green Lanterns. Kim Mai Guest and Tara Strong voice the character in Justice League and Duck Dodgers respectively.

== Publication history ==
Katma Tui first appeared in Green Lantern (vol. 2) #30 (July 1964) and was created by writer John Broome and artist Gil Kane.

== Fictional character biography ==
Katma Tui hails from the planet Korugar, in the area of space designated Sector 1417 by the Guardians of the Universe. Tui leads a rebellion against Thaal Sinestro, a Korugarian and member of the Green Lantern Corps who used his power to conquer Korugar. Tomar-Re nominates Tui as Sinestro's replacement as Green Lantern of Sector 1417, which she accepts.

=== Marriage ===
When Hal Jordan resigns from the Corps for Carol Ferris, Tui is infuriated, given that Jordan had persuaded her to give up Imi Kann for the Corps. When John Stewart initially turns down the offer of replacing Jordan as Green Lantern of Earth, Tui, projecting her anger towards Jordan upon Stewart, dismisses him as a coward, which provokes Stewart into changing her mind. Tui would eventually train Stewart and work closely with him on a number of missions. The two soon fall in love, and with the blessings of the Guardians they marry.

=== Death and legacy ===
Katma Tui is killed by Carol Ferris as Star Sapphire while she is unpowered, being sliced to death in her kitchen. Star Sapphire did this simply to make a point to Hal Jordan.

During the Green Lantern: Mosaic series, John Stewart becomes involved with the Mosaic World, a composite planet created by the rogue Guardian Appa Ali Apsa. Stewart becomes the first mortal Guardian of the Universe, known as the Master Builder. Stewart is reunited with Katma Tui, but she is killed after Hal Jordan, possessed by Parallax, kills the Guardians and destroys the Central Power Battery.

In the "Blackest Night" crossover, black power rings are sent throughout the universe, reanimating the bodies of the deceased. Katma Tui is among the first to be resurrected as a member of the Black Lantern Corps. Tui travels to the planet Xanshi to see John Stewart and tries to weaken him by claiming that he caused the planet's destruction. Stewart, spurred on by Fatality, says that he was not the cause of it all and successfully fights off the Black Lanterns. Tui is destroyed by Stewart and Fatality.

In DC Rebirth, Hal Jordan encounters Katma Tui after being transported into the Emerald Space, an afterlife for fallen Green Lanterns. She asks about John Stewart, with Jordan revealing that Stewart still misses her.

In Geoffrey Thorne's run on Green Lantern, John Stewart split into two versions of himself, with one version going out to find Katma Tui in the Dark Sectors while the other returns to the Green Lantern Corps.

=== Return ===
In Morgan Hampton's Green Lantern Corps run, the version of John Stewart that had returned to the Green Lantern Corps in Thorne's run died when he sacrificed himself to re-power the Source Battery on Oa. His ring then went out to the Dark Sectors, where it found the other John having successfully re-united and living with Katma. Upon the ring finding them, John and Katma returned to Oa and the Green Lantern Corps.

== Other versions ==
An alternate universe variant of Katma Tui appears in Batman: In Darkest Knight.

== In other media ==
- Katma Tui makes a non-speaking appearance in the Superman: The Animated Series episode "In Brightest Day...".
- Katma Tui appears in the Justice League episode "Hearts and Minds", voiced by Kim Mai Guest.
- Katma Tui makes a non-speaking appearance in the Justice League Unlimited episode "The Return".
- Katma Tui appears in the Duck Dodgers episode "The Green Loontern", voiced by Tara Strong.
- Katma Tui makes a non-speaking cameo appearance in the Batman: The Brave and the Bold episode "Day of the Dark Knight!".
- Katma Tui appears as a character summon in Scribblenauts Unmasked: A DC Comics Adventure.
- Katma Tui appears in Legion of Super Heroes in the 31st Century #6.
