= Emerald Twilight =

DC comic book saga

- Cover to Green Lantern (vol. 3) #50 (March 1994). Hal Jordan becomes Parallax. Art by Darryl Banks.
- Publisher: DC Comics
- Publication date: January – March 1994
- Genre: Superhero
- Title(s): Green Lantern vol. 3 #48–50
- Main character(s): Hal Jordan; Parallax; Guardians of the Universe

Creative team
- Writer: Ron Marz
- Penciller(s): Bill Willingham (#48); Fred Haynes (#49); Darryl Banks (#50)
- Inker(s): Romeo Tanghal (#48–50); Robert Campanella (#48); Dennis Cramer (#49)
- Letterer: Albert DeGuzman
- Colorist: Steve Mattsson
- Editor: Kevin Dooley
- Emerald Twilight / New Dawn: ISBN 978-1-56389-999-7

"Emerald Twilight" is a 1994 comic book story told in Green Lantern (vol. 3) #48–50, written by Ron Marz, drawn by Darryl Banks and published by DC Comics. The story introduced a new Green Lantern, Kyle Rayner, who gained a significant fan following.

"Emerald Twilight" was collected as a trade paperback collection in 1994 reprinting the entire three-issue story arc in one volume as Green Lantern: Emerald Twilight (ISBN 978-1-56389-164-9), with cover art by Tony Harris. It was later collected again in 2003 as the Green Lantern: Emerald Twilight/New Dawn TPB (ISBN 978-1-56389-999-7), reprinting Green Lantern (vol. 3) #48–50 and also #51–55, the early stories of Rayner becoming the new Green Lantern with new cover art by Alan Davis and Mark Farmer.

A second collection was released in the 2017 trade paperback Kyle Rayner, Green Lantern, Volume One including Green Lantern #0 and #56–57, R.E.B.E.L.S. '94 #1 and The New Titans #116–117.

== Synopsis ==
In Green Lantern #46, as part of the "Reign of the Supermen!" storyline, the extraterrestrial villain Mongul teams up with Cyborg Superman, who had disguised himself as Superman. They use a series of bombs to destroy Hal Jordan's home city of Coast City with the intention of using the area as one of four way-stations for a giant engine that will transform Earth into the massive spaceship Warworld. Hal returns to the city to find it destroyed and furiously attacks, hearing the voices of those killed crying out in his mind. The voices fall silent when Hal defeats Mongul in battle. Hal also witnesses the return of Superman, who has defeated the Cyborg elsewhere in the city.

In issue #47, he teamed up with Green Arrow for a completely different mission, and at the end of the issue, his thoughts once again turn to Coast City.

Issue #48 began with Hal in the center of what used to be Coast City, clutching the remains of a doll—the only physical evidence of the seven million people who once lived there. In a moment of pure anguish, Hal uses his power ring to re-create Coast City, down to the people who had previously died, including his father. When his ring's energy runs out, one of the Guardians of the Universe contacts him via a holographic projection to tell him he is in violation of one of the principal rules of the Green Lantern Corps, which forbids Lanterns from using their rings for personal gain. Enraged at their apathy, Hal siphons energy from the projection and makes his way to the Guardians' planet Oa, with the intent of bleeding off all the energy from the Main Power Battery to recreate Coast City.

Issue #49 saw him going up against various members of the Green Lantern Corps, each of whom fell against Hal, until he got to Oa. Hal steals the rings from each defeated colleague and leaves them for dead.

Issue #50 sees Hal battle the renegade former Green Lantern Sinestro on Oa, who had been previously imprisoned in the Main Battery, but released by the Guardians to stop Jordan. Jordan then proceeds to kill Sinestro, as well as his fellow Green Lantern Kilowog. The Guardians, having realized that their cause was lost, give all their remaining energy to the Guardian Ganthet before dying. Hal takes all the energy in the Central Power Battery, and when he emerged from it, he has a new costume and takes the name Parallax.

== Aftermath ==
Ganthet travels to Earth and finds an illustrator named Kyle Rayner (who had been briefly introduced at the end of issue #48 when he saw Hal fly off and mistook his energy trail for a comet). Ganthet gives Kyle the last remaining power ring, thus making him the last Green Lantern. As Parallax, Hal Jordan became a recurring villain in the DC Universe.

In "Emerald Fallout", which takes place in issues #18–21 of Guy Gardner: Warrior, Guy Gardner receives a vision of the events of "Emerald Twilight". Guy, along with Wonder Woman, Alan Scott, Arisia Rrab, Darkstar Ferrin Colos, Martian Manhunter, Captain Atom, and Ray go to what was left of Oa. He challenges Hal and is defeated when Hal melts his power ring.

The character played a central role during the Zero Hour storyline. Later Hal displays his final act of heroism, sacrificing his life to reignite the Sun at the conclusion of The Final Night storyline. Redeemed in the eyes of many of his fellow heroes, he received a hero's funeral. Not fit either for Heaven or Hell, Jordan's soul was destined for Purgatory, until he became the host of the Spectre in Day of Judgment.

In Green Lantern: Rebirth, Hal Jordan's actions were revealed to be the result of being under the influence of the fear entity Parallax.

== Behind the scenes ==
Originally "Emerald Twilight" was scripted by Gerard Jones and according to Previews Vol. III #8 (Aug 1993) and the November 1993 Comics Scoreboard, was to involve two sets of the extraterrestrial altruists known as the Guardians and Hal Jordan, a member of their intergalactic police force, the Green Lanterns, having to choose which set was real. DC Editorial did not think this idea was interesting enough to draw new readers so then-publisher Paul Levitz, along with senior group editors Mike Carlin, Dennis O'Neil, and Archie Goodwin, and Green Lantern editor Kevin Dooley plotted the "Emerald Twilight" story. It was given to Ron Marz to write.

== In other media ==
- "Emerald Twilight" was to be adapted into a video game for the Super NES by developer Ocean Software. The game would have allowed players to assume the role of Kyle Rayner and take on Hal Jordan. The game was cancelled.
- The animated film Green Lantern: Beware My Power adapts parts of the "Emerald Twilight" saga.
