= Salaak =

Superhero in DC Comics

- Salaak as depicted in Hal Jordan and The Green Lantern Corps #13 (January 2017), art by Ethan Van Sciver.

Publication information
- Publisher: DC Comics
- First appearance: Green Lantern (vol. 2) #149 (February 1982)
- Created by: Marv Wolfman; Joe Staton

In-story information
- Species: Slyggian
- Place of origin: Slyggia
- Team affiliations: Green Lantern Corps
- Notable aliases: Green Lantern
- Abilities: Green Lantern Power Ring

Salaak is a comic book superhero, an extraterrestrial from the planet Slyggia, and a member of the intergalactic police force known as the Green Lantern Corps, who appears in DC Comics. Physically, he has pinkish orange skin and four arms.

== Publication history ==
Salaak first appears in Green Lantern #149 and was created by Marv Wolfman and Joe Staton.

== Fictional character biography ==
A famous pessimist and loner, Salaak is a creature of protocol and laws. A veteran Green Lantern, he has served in many Corps campaigns over the years. During the Crisis on Infinite Earths he protects multiple sectors, but found the experience depressing. After this, he went to Earth looking for company amongst his fellow Green Lanterns. He served with the contingent of Green Lanterns assigned to Earth and became good friends with Ch'p. For a time Salaak lived in the future, filling the identity of Pol Manning as Hal Jordan had before him. While in the future, Salaak was married to a human woman.

Salaak returns to the present day to warn about the destruction of the Corps, but is unable to stop the Central Power Battery from being destroyed.

Salaak ends up captured, along with multiple other Green Lanterns and one Darkstar. They are scheduled to be sold into slavery but former Green Lantern Guy Gardner rescues the entire group.

=== Promotion ===
Salaak attends Hal's memorial service on Earth. The Corps, reformed again, has Salaak as the senior administrator and the Keeper of the Book of Oa. The Book tells of the adventures of multiple Green Lanterns throughout the history of the universe.

Salaak reinforces the squadron of Lanterns sent to save Mogo from Ranx the Sentient City and other Sinestro Corps members (Sinestro having returned from the dead). He has expressed displeasure at the fact that the Guardians have rewritten the Book of Oa to allow lethal force against members of the Sinestro Corps, but is still committed to serve.

He survived the Sinestro Corps War without major injuries, and he continues to hold on to his position as keeper of the Book of Oa. He is kept out of the loop in some instances by the Guardians who neglected to tell him their plans to create the Alpha Lanterns. He is seen getting into an argument with Guy Gardner over a bar he wishes to open. Salaak quickly disapproves, which leads Guy to use his ring to make a miniaturized version of Salaak mocking him for "hanging out with midgets".

Salaak is seen in Final Crisis #5 as part of the trial of Hal Jordan.

During the Blackest Night, Oa comes under siege from the Black Lantern Corps. With the Guardians missing, Salaak takes command of the Green Lantern Corps as Clarissi and thus the next in succession after the Guardians, preventing the Alpha Lanterns' attempt to take control. As his first command decision, Salaak decrees that all fallen Lantern rings be sent to Mogo, so as not to endanger any new recruits.

After the War of the Green Lanterns, Salaak went along with the Guardians' orders to prepare a space for Krona in the Green Lantern memorial hall despite the other Corps members' anger at such a decision, despite Salaak claiming that the Guardians want to remember the good that Krona did in helping to found the Corps rather than the evil he committed later, with the other Corps members denouncing him for his blind loyalty.

When Kyle Rayner is briefly turned into a ring magnet, Salaak attempts to remove Kyle's Green Lantern ring on the Guardians' orders. Kyle's ring resists Salaak's attempt at removal as Kyle protests the decision and what they did to Ganthet. Later, Salaak assigns the Green Lantern B'dg to find Hal Jordan on Earth and discovers that the green rings are being delayed under the authorization of the Guardians to which he also secretly informs Kilowog of these events. Concerned at recent events, Salaak begins to spy on the Guardians, learning of their plans for the Third Army. He is subsequently caught and locked away despite his protests that their plans are wrong. After the unemotional Guardians are killed off by Sinestro, Salaak is freed from his imprisonment by Kilowog and Guy Gardner, who explain to him the events regarding the villainous First Lantern. Later, Salaak helps Guy search for his old arch-enemy, Xar. Guy slays Xar on Earth.

As with most Lanterns, Salaak is lost in the dying universe proceeding this one. He is fortunate to be one of the few Lanterns on the thriving, living Lantern world Mogo, which has become a center of activity in what is left of said universe.

The Corps have returned, damaged and with many casualties, to their proper place and time. Salaak has returned to active duty, such as assisting against the brainwashing menace Starro.

== Other versions ==
- An alternate universe variant of Salaak makes a cameo appearance in Planetary as one of several Green Lanterns killed by the titular villains.
- Salaak appears in a Least I Could Do web comic.

== In other media ==
=== Television ===
- Salaak makes a non-speaking cameo appearance in the Superman: The Animated Series episode "In Brightest Day...".
- Salaak makes a non-speaking appearance in the Justice League Unlimited episode "The Return".
- Salaak makes a non-speaking cameo appearance in the Duck Dodgers episode "The Green Loontern".
- Salaak makes non-speaking cameo appearances in Batman: The Brave and the Bold.
- Salaak appears in Green Lantern: The Animated Series, voiced by Tom Kenny.

=== Film ===
==== Live-action ====
Salaak makes a non-speaking cameo appearance in Green Lantern.

==== Animation ====
- Salaak makes a non-speaking cameo appearance in Green Lantern: First Flight.
- Salaak appears in Green Lantern: Emerald Knights, voiced by Peter Jessop.
- Salaak appears in Justice League vs. the Fatal Five, voiced again by Tom Kenny.
- Salaak makes a non-speaking cameo appearance in Justice League Dark: Apokolips War. He is seen fighting against Darkseid's forces but is killed in battle along with the other Lanterns.

=== Video games ===
Salaak appears as a character summon in Scribblenauts Unmasked: A DC Comics Adventure.

=== Miscellaneous ===
Salaak appears in Smallville Season 11.
