= Psion (comics) =

Fictional alien species in the DC Universe

Publication information
- Publisher: DC Comics
- First appearance: The Witching Hour #13 (March 1971)
- Created by: Marv Wolfman; George Pérez

Characteristics
- Place of origin: Maltus

The Psions are a fictional extraterrestrial species in the DC Universe. The Psions first appeared in Tales of the New Teen Titans #4 (September 1982) and were created by Marv Wolfman and George Pérez. The earliest uncredited appearance of the Psions was in The Witching Hour #13 (March 1971), written by Wolfman.

== Fictional biography ==
The Psions are lizard-like aliens who are originally from the planet Maltus and were enhanced by the Maltusians. After the Maltusians leave, the Psions investigate their labs and mimic their creators, cutting off their tails to look more like them. After several millennia, the Psions leave Maltus to reunite with their creators, now known as the Guardians of the Universe. The Guardians send the Psions to a distant galaxy where they will be undisturbed. They initially prevent the Green Lantern Corps from interacting with the Psions, but later lift this ban.

Discovering their creators and then feeling humiliated by the same, the Psions bury the truth, forget their background, and resume their scientific work. They repeatedly rediscover their origins, but suppress their knowledge soon after. The Psions refuse to acknowledge that their creators do not want or believe in them.

The Psions created the species of the Vega system, subconsciously replicating their own origins. Active against them are the Omega Men, an interstellar group of rebels from across Vega. The Psions were responsible for enhancing the powers of the Tamaraneans Komand'r and Koriand'r, giving them the ability to project energy blasts. The Psions also empowered Vega native X'Hal, giving her godlike abilities.

Gorius Karkum, a female Psion, is a member of the Green Lantern Corps. Initially exploited by the male Psions and forced to have dozens of children, Gorius is chosen by a Green Lantern ring after it senses her indomitable spirit.

== In other media ==
- The Psions appear in Justice League Unlimited #18.
- The Psions appear in Batman: The Brave and the Bold #12.
