= Patrick Gleason (artist) =

American comic book artist

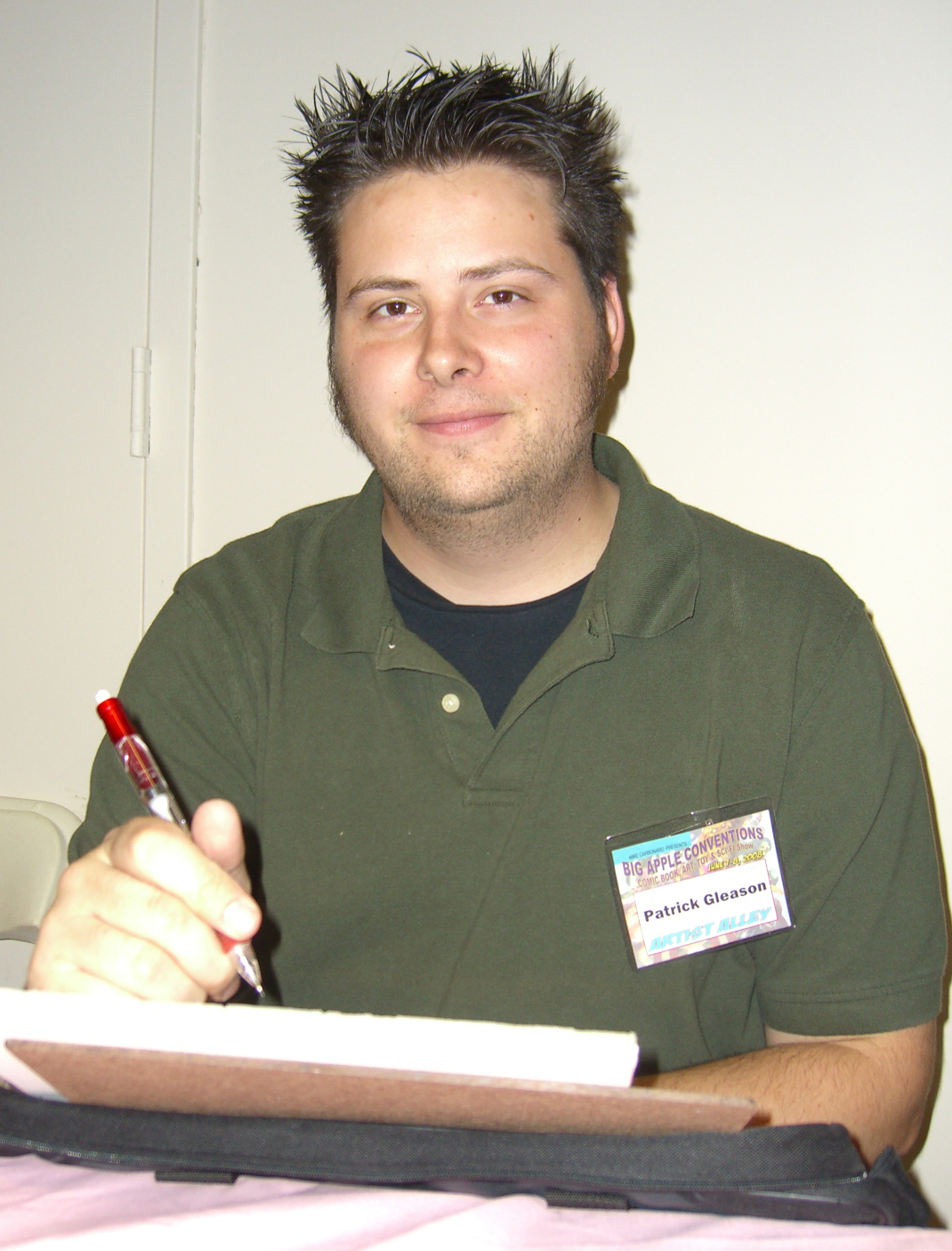
- Patrick Gleason at the 2008; Big Apple Comic Convention in Manhattan
- Areas: Writer, Penciller
- Notable works: Green Lantern Corps, Batman and Robin, The Amazing Spider-Man

Patrick Gleason is an American comic book artist and writer. He has worked for DC Comics, Marvel Comics, and Image Comics.

== Published work ==
- X-Men Unlimited #22 (with Brian K Vaughan, Marvel Comics, 1999)
- Martian Manhunter Vol. 2 #24 (inker, with Tom Mandrake, Doug Mahnke, DC Comics, 2000)
- Noble Causes #1-4 (with Jay Faerber, Image Comics, 2002)
- JSA #39 (with Geoff Johns, David S. Goyer, DC Comics, 2002)
- JLA: Welcome to the Working Week One-Shot (with Patton Oswalt, DC Comics, 2003)
- H-E-R-O #7-8 (with Will Pfeifer, DC Comics, 2003)
- Aquaman Vol. 6 #15-22, 25-29, 32 (with Will Pfeifer and John Arcudi, DC Comics, 2004-05)
- Green Lantern Corps: Recharge #1-5 (with Geoff Johns and Dave Gibbons, DC Comics, 2005-06)
- Green Lantern Corps #1-3, 7-16, 18-20, 23-26, 29-47 (with Dave Gibbons, Keith Champagne, and Peter Tomasi, DC Comics, 2006-10)
- Brightest Day #1-3, 6-9, 11-12, 15, 21, 24 (with Geoff Johns and Peter Tomasi, DC Comics, 2010-11)
- Batman and Robin #20-22 (with Peter Tomasi, DC Comics, 2011)
- Batman and Robin Vol. 2 #0-8, 10-20, 22-30, 32-40 (with Peter Tomasi, DC Comics, 2011-15)
- Robin: Son of Batman 1-6, 9 (writer/artist), #7 (writer only, DC Comics, 2015-16)
- Superman: Rebirth #1 (writer, with Peter Tomasi and Doug Mahnke, DC Comics, 2016)
- Superman Vol. 4 #1-25, 27-28, 33-39, 42-45, Annual #1, Special #1 (writer, with Peter Tomasi; also artist on #1-2, 4, 6, 10-11, 18-21, 24-25, 42-43, 45, DC Comics, 2016-18)
- Super Sons #11-12 (writer, with Peter Tomasi, Ryan Benjamin, and Tyler Kirkham, DC Comics 2017)
- Teen Titans vol. 6 #15 (writer, with Peter Tomasi and Ed Benes, DC Comics 2017)
- Action Comics #1000-1002 (with Peter Tomasi and Brian Bendis, DC Comics, 2018)
- Young Justice #1-4 (with Brian Bendis, DC Comics, 2019)
- Amazing Spider-Man Vol. 5 #25, 32-34, 50-52, 55, 61-62, 74-76, 83, 89-90, 93 (writer, with Nick Spencer, Zeb Wells, Marvel Comics, 2019-2022)
- Batman: Secret Files #2 (with Tim Seeley, DC Comics, 2019)
- Marvel Comics #1000 (single page story, writer/artist, Marvel Comics, 2019)
- Amazing Spider-Man Vol. 6 #9, 31-35, 60 (with Zeb Wells, Marvel Comics, 2022-2024)
