= Indigo Tribe =

DC comics organization

- Interior artwork from Blackest Night #0 (July 2009). Art by Doug Mahnke.

Group publication information
- Publisher: DC Comics
- First appearance: Green Lantern (vol. 4) #25 (January 2008)
- Created by: Geoff Johns (writer); Ethan Van Sciver (artist)

In-story information
- Base(s): Nok
- Leader(s): Indigo-1, Munk

Roster
- See: Members

Indigo Tribe
- Genre: Superhero
- Creator(s): Geoff Johns (writer); Ethan Van Sciver (artist)

The Indigo Tribe is a fictional organization that appears in DC Comics publications, primarily those of the Green Lantern series. In the DC Universe, it is one of the seven major groups known to comprise the Lantern Corps. Their powers, based on the emotional spectrum, are fueled by the emotion of compassion. The group was created by comic book writer Geoff Johns and comic book artist Ethan Van Sciver. It made its debut in the issue #25 of Green Lantern (vol. 4) in December 2007.

== Background ==
The Indigo Tribe is one of the Corps of the emotional spectrum within the DC Universe setting. Each "Emotional Spectrum" Corps has both a corresponding color of the rainbow and an emotional theme attached to it, with several of the Corps (such as the Green Lantern Corps and Red Lantern Corps) being named after their respective color. The Indigo Tribe's members use indigo-light-powered rings and staffs and are powered by the indigo light of compassion.

The group first appeared in Green Lantern (vol. 4) #25, published in December 2007, where it is described as having a reclusive nature that makes it the most elusive group among its peers; the Tribe's stated purpose is to spread goodwill throughout the universe.

In a March 2009 interview with New Sarama, creator Geoff Johns said that the Indigo Tribe would be introduced in the Blackest Night series. Johns stated that he had been "very careful with Indigo because they're not what everyone expects, and they act very differently than what everyone expects". In April 2009, artist Ed Benes posted the artwork for the tie-in miniseries Blackest Night: Tales of the Corps, which features a member from each of the seven Corps; the solicitation copy announced "the first appearance of the mysterious Indigo, leader of the Indigo Tribe!". Johns later revealed the leader's name to be Indigo-1. Promotional material for Blackest Night described the group as being unknown to the DC Universe at large.

The Indigo Tribe made its first extended appearance in the July 2009 issue Blackest Night: Tales of the Corps #1. Ethan Van Sciver, who created the initial design for the Indigo Tribe, said that members of the group abandon everything and devote themselves to compassion. Their uniforms have a basic, handmade appearance, their bodies are adorned with the Indigo Lantern symbol written in body paint, and they carry carved lantern-like staffs with them. Van Sciver also designed the staffs, which he wanted to look "lovingly handmade by people who had better things to do than make themselves look good", and said that his initial thoughts were that the Tribe would be opposites to the Orange Lanterns.

== Group history ==
=== Blackest Night ===
A group of Indigo Tribesmen, led by Indigo-1, traverses a desert landscape in Sector 3544, where it observes explosive displays of green and yellow light in the distance. The group investigates the site and finds a wounded Green Lantern Corps member lying on the ground. He reports that he was in a conflict with a "being who knows no mercy" and tells the group to stay away so as to not attract the being's attention. Indigo-1 says something, but when the Green Lantern member asks his ring to translate, it replies that it cannot, despite having a catalog of known languages in the DC Universe. Indigo-1 kneels and places her hand on his heart; her indigo power ring responds with the word "will". Drawing power from the Green Lantern, she creates a simple green light construct that fatally suffocates him. The attacker, a member of the Sinestro Corps, emerges and exclaims that he will not be taken down as easily as he fires a beam of yellow energy at Indigo-1. However, Indigo-1 is not fazed by his threat, and her power staff absorbs the beam. As her power ring says "fear", she creates a monstrous yellow light construct that frightens her attacker away.

Indigo-1 and Munk arrive on Earth to help Hal Jordan, the Flash, and the Atom escape from a group of Black Lanterns. Indigo-1 channels Jordan's green light through her staff and kills Black Lanterns Elongated Man and Sue Dibny by destroying their rings. Indigo-1 explains that the Black Lanterns can only truly be defeated if the Corps work together and recreate the white light of creation.

Indigo-1 and her allies encounter the Life Entity, the embodiment of life. Hal Jordan bonds with the Entity; they convert some of the Black Lanterns into White Lanterns and resurrect Black Hand. Nekron is destroyed without Hand to act as a tether. The Indigo Tribe imprisons Hand, who bears an imprint of the Indigo Tribe symbol and a power staff.

=== Brightest Day ===
During the search for the emotional entities, Indigo-1 returns to Earth to infuse Proselyte, the Indigo Tribe's emotional entity, into Shane Thompson, a paramedic who prioritized the care of a mortally wounded patient over a less-wounded man who had health insurance. Indigo-1 and Black Hand visit Hal Jordan, Barry Allen, Sinestro, Saint Walker and Larfleeze. The others realize that the Indigo Tribe cannot feel any emotion without the rings. The Indigo Tribe offers to take the remaining emotional entities into protective custody, but Jordan declines. Parallax takes over Allen and desires to take over Jordan. Adara, the entity of hope, fights a cloaked villain who reveals himself to be Krona, who has been planning on capturing all of the entities. Proselyte frees Flash from Parallax's control by reigniting his emotion for compassion over his fear.

=== War of the Green Lanterns ===
In the "War of the Green Lanterns" storyline, Krona traps Indigo-1 and the allied Corps members in the Book of the Black, where they are forced to relive their lives prior to acquiring their rings. Meanwhile, John Stewart uses Indigo-1's ring after his Green Lantern ring is contaminated by Krona and Parallax, but struggles to wield its power. When Sinestro tries to escape the book, he encounters Indigo-1, who is revealed to be named Iroque. When Kyle Rayner frees her from the Book of the Black, Iroque does not remember her Indigo-1 identity until she puts on her indigo ring.

=== The New 52 ===
In September 2011, The New 52 rebooted DC's continuity. In this new timeline, the Indigo Tribe learns that Sinestro is returning to Earth to assume his old role of Green Lantern. Sinestro asks Hal Jordan to work with him as the Guardians are planning to replace the Green Lantern Corps with the Third Army; however, the Indigo Tribe goes to Earth and captures Sinestro. Jordan follows them to Nok, the Indigo homeworld, but he is captured and delivered to Black Hand. Jordan tricks Hand into recharging his ring, and escapes; however, he discovers that Sinestro has been forcibly inducted into the Indigo Tribe.

As he flees into the jungles of Nok, Jordan finds the Indigo Central Battery and meets its guardian Natromo, who tells him of the Indigo Tribe's history. Centuries ago, violent explorers came to Nok and captured its natives before transporting them across the universe to fates unknown. When Abin Sur arrived on Nok, he allied with Natromo, one of the remaining free natives, and fought against the invaders. Together, Sur and Natromo discovered the indigo light in a cavern and founded the Indigo Tribe.

Jordan and Sinestro are pursued by the former Tribesmen through the forests of Nok. They encounter Natromo, who is returning to his people. When Jordan reveals that Abin Sur is dead, Natromo destroys the Indigo battery, believing that there is no hope with Sur dead. The two are approached by Iroque, who begs Natromo to find a way to restore their rings. The sadness and compassion she feels for what she did to Sur and his daughter is the spark that enables Natromo to reforge the battery.

Meanwhile, Munk joins the New Guardians as the representative for the Indigo Tribe. He works alongside Fatality as they investigate the Orrery that has turned Kyle Rayner into a magnet for every type of power ring. In the New Guardians' fight against Larfleeze, Munk duplicates Larfleeze's ring, which proves to be the New Guardians' only effective weapon against Larfleeze.

== Members ==
Indigo-1 as depicted in Green Lantern (vol. 4) #47 (October 2009). Art by Ed Benes.

=== Prominent members ===
- Indigo-1 (Iroque) (sector unknown): A violet-skinned alien and leader of the Indigo Tribe. She is later revealed to be Iroque, Abin Sur's greatest enemy, who is responsible for the death of his daughter. She becomes the first person to convert to the Indigo Tribe.
- Munk (sector unknown): The Indigo Tribe's second-in-command. Munk represented the Indigo Tribe as part of the New Guardians.
- Natromo: The keeper of the Indigo Light.
- Kreaven (sector unknown): A bird-like alien and former psychopath.
- Slog the Slayer (sector unknown): Slog is a former psychopath who was converted to a member of the Indigo Tribe.
- Trinity (sector unknown).
- Joshua (sector unknown): A "niche" Genocidal maniac who was converted to a member of the Indigo Tribe in the Lanterns show.

=== Former members ===
- John Stewart (of Sector 2814): During the Brightest Day and War of the Green Lanterns storyline, after Krona launches his attack on Oa and restores Parallax to the Green Central Battery, Stewart is forced to remove his green power ring to avoid being contaminated by the yellow impurity. Hal Jordan gives Stewart Indigo-1's ring so he can fight Krona.
- Atom (Ray Palmer) (of Sector 2814): A professor at Pace University, he is the second Atom and selected by an Indigo Power Ring as a deputy member of the Indigo Tribe during Blackest Night.
- Shane Thompson (of Sector 2814): A paramedic who was pinned under an ambulance in an accident, yet still attempted to help the wounded. Due to his abundance of compassion, Thompson becomes the host for Proselyte, the entity of compassion.
- Thaal Sinestro (of Sector 1417): In The New 52 storyline, Sinestro is captured by and forcibly recruited into the Indigo Tribe. He is freed when Natromo destroys the Indigo Central Battery.
- Black Hand (William Hand) (of Sector 2814): The founder of the Black Lantern Corps, who was captured by the Indigo Tribe and converted into an Indigo Lantern.
- Krona (of sector 0): Krona temporarily becomes a member of the Indigo Tribe during the War of the Green Lanterns story line when he puts on Indigo-1's power ring. After he is killed, the power ring returns to Indigo-1.

== Oath ==
As with the other Corps of the emotional spectrum, the Indigo Tribe charges its rings by reciting an oath, but uses a power staff instead of a power battery. The oath is spoken in an alien language that power rings cannot translate. Johns has said that the Corps oaths have a tempo regardless of what language they are spoken in, adding that "the Indigo Tribe speaks an interesting one."

Tor lorek san, bor nakka mur,

Natromo faan tornek wot ur.
Ter Lantern ker lo Abin Sur,
Taan lek lek nok--Formorrow Sur!

— Indigo-1, Blackest Night #5 (January 2010)

== Entity: Proselyte ==
Proselyte as depicted in Green Lantern (vol. 4) #52 (May 2010). Art by Doug Mahnke.

Proselyte is the embodiment of compassion; it is the emotional spectrum entity for the Indigo Tribe. The entity is revealed during the Blackest Night storyline. In Green Lantern (vol. 4) #52, Proselyte's origins is explained as: "Rage grows from murder. Hope from Prayer. And at last, compassion is offered to us all." It takes the form of a cephalopod with four visible appendages, which represent it reaching out to offer itself to all living beings. Its inner surface is lined with features that resemble the Indigo Tribe's insignia.

In Brightest Day, the Life Entity attracts Proselyte to Earth, where it is sought after by the Indigo Tribe, the allied Corps members, and Krona. The Indigo Tribe finds Proselyte and uses its powers to convert Black Hand to the Tribe. Proselyte possesses the body of Shane Thompson, a paramedic who cares full-heartedly for his patients.

Proselyte and the Blue Lantern entity Adara are captured by Krona. After he invades Oa, Krona forces Proselyte to possess one of the Guardians of the Universe. Proselyte is freed when Hal Jordan kills Krona and is allowed to freely roam the universe.

During the "Green Lantern: Lights Out" storyline, Proselyte and the emotional entities are weakened by the emotional spectrum being drained and sacrifice themselves by passing into the Source Wall to repair the spectrum. Proselyte returns in Green Lantern Corps (vol. 4), where the Green Lantern Corps free it and the other entities from the Source Wall to help combat Starbreaker.

== The Tome of Compassion ==
The Book of the Indigo Tribe is a relative obscure artifact compared to the Book of Oa. Its records are written in a cryptic and untranslatable language and contains the philosophy and rituals of the Indigo Tribe. The tome outlines how the Indigo light forces its members to feel the collective pain of their victims, essentially using empathy as a punishment and a path to redemption. The tome also chronicles the "Blood Prophecies", and contains the instructions for the Indigo Tribe to act as a secret army to eventually capture the Guardians of the Universe and force them to feel compassion and preventing a universal catastrophe.

== Powers and abilities ==
Indigo Lantern power ring

The Indigo Tribe harnesses the indigo light of compassion. Robin S. Rosenberg, a clinical psychologist and editor of the anthology The Psychology of Superheroes, describes compassion as being able to have empathy for someone while maintaining enough distance to understand their motivations.

The indigo ring has basic power ring abilities such as flight and aura projection. Members can use indigo light to teleport themselves and others over vast intergalactic distances. However, teleportation drains much of the ring's power and is thus used sparingly. The indigo light can also heal individuals with great empathy but exposes people to the pain they have inflicted on others.

The Indigo ring not only stores indigo light energy, but also is capable of channeling the energy of other emotional lights; the ring can therefore emulate the abilities from other Corps.

In the bonding process, the indigo ring forces its wearer to feel nothing but compassion. The ring is classified as parasitic and bonds most effectively with a user that lacks compassion. When the ring is removed, the wearer loses the memories of the time with the ring and reverts to their old behavior, although this can be undone by re-donning the ring. If one voluntarily dons the ring, they can use it without being mentally altered.

== Other versions ==
=== Star Trek/Green Lantern: The Spectrum War ===
In the crossover series Star Trek/Green Lantern, Leonard McCoy becomes an Indigo Lantern after Ganthet transports one power ring from each Corps to the Star Trek universe.

== In other media ==
=== Video games ===
- The Indigo Tribe appears in Scribblenauts Unmasked: A DC Comics Adventure, consisting of Indigo-1, Munk, and Kreaven.
- Indigo-1 appears as a playable character in Lego Batman 3: Beyond Gotham, voiced by Kari Wahlgren.
- Proselyte appears in Atrocitus' ending in Injustice 2.
- The Indigo Tribe's homeworld appears in loading screens and background images depicted in DC Universe Online.

=== Merchandise ===
- Indigo-1 was featured in the DC Comics Super Hero Collection in 2010.
- Indigo-1 received a six-inch figure in the "Blackest Night" toyline.
- A six-inch Munk figure was included in the "Blackest Night" toyline four-pack.
- A light-up Indigo Ring was released by DC Direct along with rings for all the other Corps.
