= Larfleeze =

Fictional comic book supervillain

- Larfleeze as depicted in Green Lantern (vol. 4) #39 (April 2009). Art by Oclair Albert.

Publication information
- Publisher: DC Comics
- First appearance: Green Lantern (vol. 4) #25 (January 2008)
- Created by: Geoff Johns (writer); Ethan Van Sciver (artist)

In-story information
- Alter ego: Agent Orange
- Place of origin: Ogatoo
- Team affiliations: Orange Lantern Corps
- Abilities: Orange Power Ring: Flight; Force field; Hard light construct generation; Real-time translation of all languages; Space travel; Immortality; Energy manipulation; Matter manipulation; Limited reality warping; Space manipulation; Superhuman strength and durability; Soul manipulation; Life and death manipulation; Psionic resistance; Weather manipulation; Orange avatar creation
Larfleeze
Publication information
- Schedule: Monthly
- Format: Ongoing series
- Genre: Superhero
- Publication date: June 2013 – June 2014
- No. of issues: 12
Creative team
- Written by: Keith Giffen; J. M. DeMatteis
- Artist: Scott Kolins

Larfleeze, also known as Agent Orange, is a supervillain appearing in comics published by DC Comics, usually as an anti hero in books featuring Green Lantern and the Green Lantern Corps. He is the primary wielder of the orange light of avarice, derived from the emotion of greed, and does not voluntarily allow others to wield it.

The character first appeared in Green Lantern vol 4 #25 (January 2008), and was created by writer Geoff Johns and artist Ethan Van Sciver.

== Publication history ==
Writer Geoff Johns developed Larfleeze as a key participant in the "Blackest Night" storyline, explaining at San Diego Comic-Con in 2009 that he came up with the name "Larfleeze" by combining the words "lard" and "sleaze". Johns also revealed that the Claim Jumper restaurant chain was his inspiration behind writing about greed. Johns states that Larfleeze is one of his favorite characters to write because of how "out of touch" the character is, adding that, other than greed, emotions have no value to him because they do not provide him with anything material. After his brief first appearance in DC Universe #0 (April 2008), the character went on to be shown in smaller teaser appearances within the Green Lantern series until his first extended appearance in Green Lantern #39 (April 2009). The issue leads into "Agent Orange" (named after the codename Larfleeze is given by the Guardians of the Universe), the storyline detailing the character's origin that also serves as a prelude to the "Blackest Night" storyline. Larfleeze's story includes an appearance in Blackest Night: Tales of the Corps #2 (July 2009). In the story Tales of the Orange Lanterns: Blume Godhead, he is shown "recruiting" one of his most recognizable Orange Lanterns.

Larfleeze received a back-up in Threshold, written by Keith Giffen, with art by Scott Kolins. The back-up ran from Threshold #1 (March 2013) to #5 (July 2013). The plot focused on the apparent theft of Larfleeze's power battery, and his attempt to retrieve it. The back-up spins off into a self-titled ongoing series, Larfleeze. Keith Giffen and Scott Kolins continued as the creative team, with J. M. DeMatteis introduced as co-writer. In March 2014, DC announced that the Larfleeze series would end with issue 12.

== Fictional character biography ==
=== Origin ===
Larfleeze is said to be over several billion years old. He was taken from his parents for reasons yet to be revealed and forced to work as a slave. His time as a slave deeply affected Larfleeze, who at some point began to "hear" the material possessions in the society of the people whom he served begging him to own them. Some time much later, Larfleeze escaped and became a wanted criminal.

Larfleeze joined a small guild of thieves which stole a number of artifacts from the planet Maltus, including a mysterious box supposedly worth an entire star system to the right buyer. In retaliation, the Guardians of the Universe sent the Manhunters to pursue them. Those who escaped discovered a map belonging to the Guardian Krona that told of treasure. The guild followed the map to the planet Okaara, where they discovered a power battery containing the orange light of avarice. Feeling its power "speak" to them, the criminals fought amongst themselves for it.

The Guardians offered the two surviving guild members (Larfleeze and Turpa) a deal: in exchange for the box, the Guardians would trade the orange light with two additional conditions. First, as long as the orange light remained within the Vega system, the Guardians would agree not to interfere with it. Then secondly, for the safety of others, only one of the two thieves would be allowed to keep the orange light for themselves. Larfleeze explained that the Guardians were desperate to get the box back because it contained the fear entity Parallax. Agreeing to these terms, the two guild members fought to the death for the right to own the orange light, and Larfleeze emerged victorious.

=== Agent Orange ===
The Controllers, seeking to obtain the orange light, attack an underground palace on Okaara and come across the Orange Lantern Power Battery. As soon as they try to take it, the Controllers are overcome and killed by Larfleeze's Orange Lanterns.

Larfleeze is enraged at this perceived violation of the agreement he has with the Guardians, as he is unable to see a distinction between them and the Controllers. The Orange Lantern Blume later captures and seriously damages Stel, branding him with the symbol of the Orange Lantern Corps. When the Green Lanterns recover Stel and return him to Oa, a construct of Larfleeze appears from the brand and confronts the Guardians about the attempt to steal the orange battery. Although the Guardians point out that the Controllers are the source of his anger, Larfleeze refuses to listen. He declares the treaty is null and void, and that the Guardians will submit to his demands or face his wrath. In response, Scar destroys the projection and states that the Guardians do not negotiate with terrorists.

The Guardians allow the Green Lanterns to enter the Vega system and attack Okaara. Hal Jordan, a new recipient of a blue power ring created by Ganthet and Sayd, is included in the assault team. Upon arriving on Okaara, the Green Lanterns are attacked by Larfleeze's Orange Lantern constructs. During the fight, Jordan is separated from the group and encounters Larfleeze, whom he manages to subdue with his blue ring.

=== Blackest Night ===
During the Blackest Night storyline, black power rings invade Larfleeze's chamber and reanimate the bodies of those whose identities he has stolen to create his constructs. Larfleeze and Atrocitus are saved by Saint Walker, Hal Jordan, Carol Ferris, Indigo-1, and Sinestro, who recruit them to assist in destroying the Black Central Power Battery. To secure Larfleeze's compliance, Sayd agrees to be his personal Guardian if he cooperates. Larfleeze agrees and ultimately accompanies the group to Earth.

Ganthet duplicates Larfleeze's ring to bolster the ranks of the light-wielders against Nekron's forces. The duplicate orange power ring is able to choose someone to become a deputy Orange Lantern for a 24-hour period. Though Larfleeze protests against anyone else's wielding of the orange light, the duplicate ring chooses Lex Luthor as its wearer. In the final issue of Blackest Night, Luthor is stripped of his power. As promised, Sayd becomes Larfleeze's personal Guardian when he demands payment for participating in their plan.

=== Brightest Day ===
Larfleeze is shown to have taken up residence in a small, upper midwestern town. He sends his Orange Lanterns into town to steal things for him. When Hal Jordan confronts him and tells him to leave the town alone, Larfleeze tells him that he will not need to ransack the town anymore because he has learned of the legend of Santa Claus. Larfleeze intends to make lists of all the things he wants and send them to Santa Claus. Jordan reveals that he has come to Larfleeze to find out how he was able to trap the orange entity in his lantern, so that they can trap the other entities to keep them out of the hands of the one trying to collect them. Before Larfleeze can tell him, Hector Hammond arrives. After struggling with Larfleeze and Jordan for the battery, Hammond ends up swallowing the battery and is possessed by Ophidian, the Orange Lantern entity.

Larfleeze is later taken to Zamaron by the Star Sapphires along with Hal, Carol, the Predator, and its host Abraham Pointe. Larfleeze is present when Carol is named queen of the Star Sapphires, and states that he wants to be queen as well. While watching over Pointe, Larfleeze is shaken to discover that Pointe knows of his past through the Predator and discloses that Larfleeze is not his real name. Larfleeze almost kills Pointe to keep him from speaking his name before returning to Earth.

=== Larfleeze Christmas Special ===
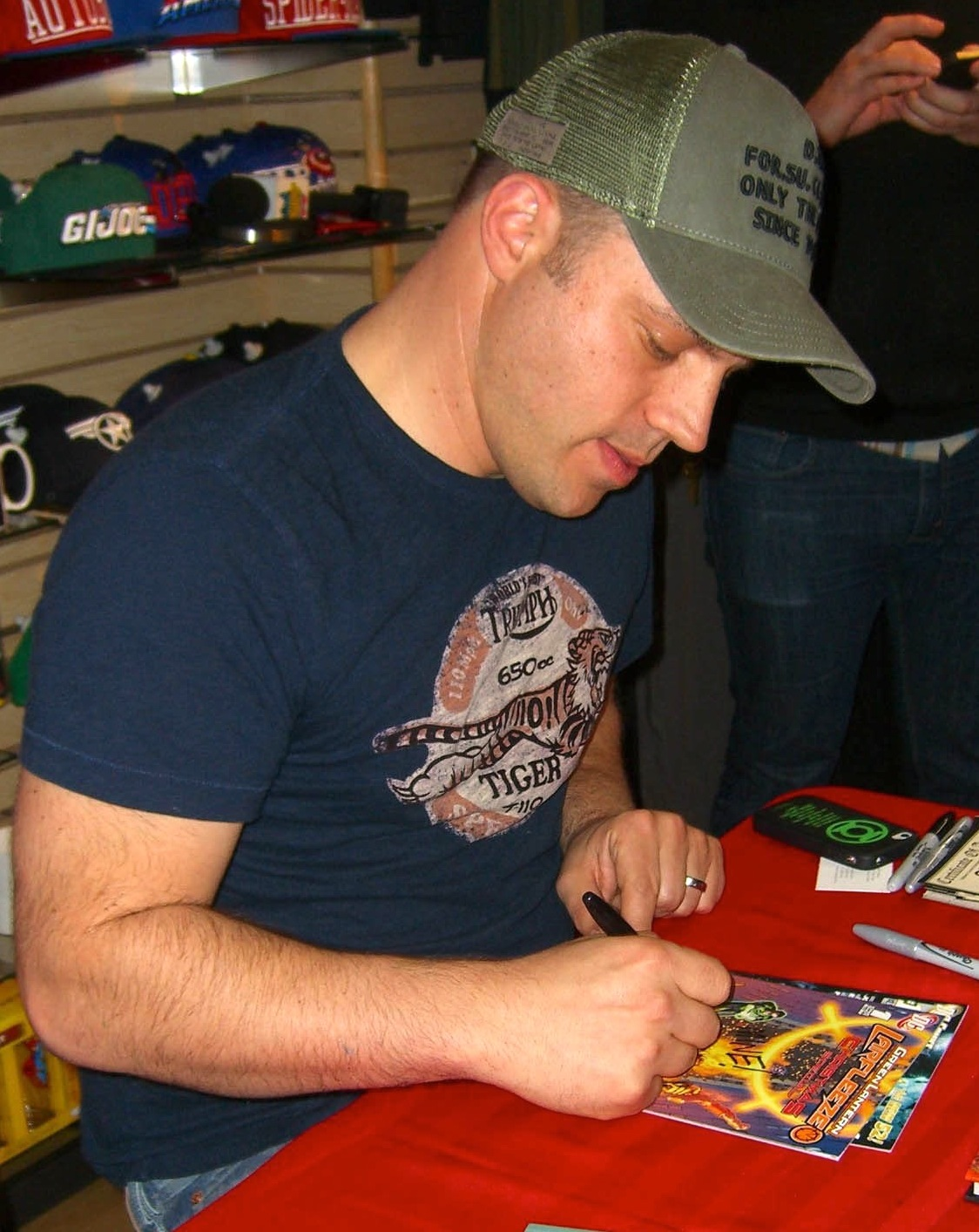
Writer Geoff Johns signing a copy of Green Lantern: Larfleeze Christmas Special at Midtown Comics in Manhattan.

On Christmas Day, Larfleeze is outraged to discover that Santa Claus hasn't brought him anything that he asked for. He attacks every costumed Santa in the nearby town, and tries to melt the North Pole, only to be stopped by Hal Jordan. Jordan tells Larfleeze of Christmas spirit, and how it comes from giving. On Hal's suggestion, Larfleeze gives away every item in his mountain of possessions, but afterwards declares that he doesn't like Christmas spirit. Jordan then suggests that he look over his Christmas list and see if he actually needed anything there. That night, Larfleeze stares at a part of his list, on which he had written "my family".

=== War of the Green Lanterns ===
When Krona's attack traps the other six New Guardians in the Book of the Black, Hal Jordan is able to escape with their rings. Although he initially discouraged John Stewart from using the ring due to its psychological effects, Hal later uses Larfleeze's orange ring in conjunction with Sinestro's ring to hold off the attacking brainwashed Green Lanterns long enough for Guy Gardner to break Parallax out of the Central Power Battery and restore their comrades to normal. While trapped inside the Book of the Black, Larfleeze is forced to relive a childhood memory of slavery. Larfleeze is later freed from the book by Kyle Rayner. When his orange ring returns to him, Larfleeze is initially fearful, saying "Keep it away from me!" Once the ring is on his finger, however, he returns to his usual mindset.

=== The New 52 ===
In The New 52 continuity reboot, Kyle Rayner becomes a magnet to the other Lantern Corps rings, which forces him to face off with the second-in-commands of the Lantern Corps. Kyle is approached by an orange ring, which is later revealed to be a disguised Glomulus.

When Kyle Rayner learns that he needs to master all aspects of the emotional spectrum to defeat the Third Army, he approaches Larfleeze for aid. Larfleeze only consents to give Kyle access to his power if Kyle can get past him in a fight and recharge from his orange battery. Kyle manages to do so while Larfleeze is occupied battling the Third Army. Larfleeze is later captured by Volthoom, who attempts to trap Larfleeze in various illusionary realities granting his greatest wish - including a world where Larfleeze never fell victim to the orange light. However, these illusions fail due to the extent of the orange ring's influence on Larfleeze.

== Powers and abilities ==
Some of Larfleeze's Orange Power Rings.

Larfleeze exclusively wields the orange light of avarice, through using his orange power ring and power battery. Some of his basic abilities are shared with other Corps: flight, aura projection, and the ability to create constructs made from light. Larfleeze is able to steal the identities of those he kills, creating orange apparitions of them. The orange light also has the power to absorb green light constructs and mystical energies (such as the magicks created by Green Lantern Torquemada). Conversely, it is depicted as being unable to absorb blue or violet light constructs.

Larfleeze's power is amplified by being in constant contact with his power battery, enabling him to maintain an entire corps of constructs even when separated from it. His control over his ring is so great that he was the only being able to retain control of his ring when a mysterious external force turned Kyle Rayner into a 'ring magnet' that caused one ring from each Corps to abandon their wielders and travel to him. However, Larfleeze is burdened with insatiable hunger as a side-effect of wielding the orange light (which can be nullified while in the presence of a Blue Lantern).

== Orange Lantern Corps ==
The Orange Lantern Corps is a supervillainous organization published by DC Comics. They first appeared in Green Lantern (vol. 4) #25 and were created by Geoff Johns and Philip Tan.

The Orange Lantern Corps is a faction of the emotional spectrum that is associated with greed. Due to the nature of its power, the Orange Light can only have one wielder, with all other members being light constructs.

=== Membership ===
==== Leadership ====
- "Larfleeze" (of Sector 2828): As Larfleeze is too greedy to share his rings, except for one given to Lex Luthor at Ganthet's insistence during "Blackest Night", he uses his ring's ability to create constructs in order to field an entire army of Orange Lanterns to face his foes for him. It is later revealed that the Orange Lanterns retain their original souls and part of their original personalities.

==== Known members ====
- Blume (of Sector 2751): A giant extraterrestrial head from the planet Blobba who proclaims himself a god of hunger so that he can intimidate the inhabitants of planets into feeding him their valuables. After failing to do the same to Larfleeze, he is made into an Orange Lantern construct and now patrols the Vega system.
- Clypta (of Sector 2829): An Orange Lantern from the Thieves' System who is reanimated as a member of the Black Lantern Corps during the "Blackest Night" storyline.
- The Controllers: The Controllers arrive on Okaara searching for the orange light to create their own Corps. However, Larfleeze kills and assimilates them.
- Glomulus (of Sector 2826): A ravenous tavern cleaner on Okaara who is consumed by Blume and transformed into an Orange Lantern. Unlike the other Orange Lanterns, he maintains aspects of his original identity.
- Gretti (former Green Lantern of Sector 2828): A former Green Lantern who Larfleeze kills and assimilates during the Green Lanterns' attack on Okaara. During the "Blackest Night" storyline, he is temporarily resurrected as a Black Lantern.
- Guardian of the Universe: While Larfleeze's thieves guild and the Guardians fought for the orange power battery, the power of the orange light is unleashed, killing one of the Guardians in the process. He is shown as being turned into an Orange Lantern construct. In Green Lantern (vol. 4) #45, a male Guardian is shown being reanimated as a Black Lantern on Okaara. However, Sayd has recently stated that Larfleeze cannot convert Guardians into Orange Lanterns, suggesting that the Guardian was a more basic construct rather than the Guardian's actual spirit.
- Nat-Nat (of Sector 228): An Orange Lantern from the planet Limey Rock who is reanimated as a member of the Black Lantern Corps during the "Blackest Night" storyline.
- Sound Dancer (of Sector 911): An Orange Lantern from the Obsidian Deeps who is reanimated as a member of the Black Lantern Corps during the "Blackest Night" storyline.
- Tammal-Tayn (of Sector 2813): An Orange Lantern from the planet Fylip who is reanimated as a member of the Black Lantern Corps during the "Blackest Night" storyline.
- Turpa: A member of the same guild of thieves as Larfleeze from the planet Ogatoo. Together, the guild steals the Guardians' map to the Orange Power Battery, and upon finding it are so overcome with greed that they fight one another for it. Turpa is killed by the power of the orange light before Larfleeze and Blooch fight to the death for the orange power battery. He is shown as having been turned into an orange light construct.
- Warp Wrap (of Sector 2): An Orange Lantern from the planet Cairo who is reanimated as a member of the Black Lantern Corps during the "Blackest Night" storyline.

==== Former members ====
- Hal Jordan (of Sector 2814): A Green Lantern officer who temporarily becomes an Orange Lantern after obtaining the Orange power battery.
- Lex Luthor (of Sector 2814): During the "Blackest Night" storyline, Lex Luthor is granted membership to the Orange Lantern Corps for a period of 24 hours, becoming the only other living member of the Corps besides Larfleeze himself and Cade who started out living and ended living. In the final issue of Blackest Night, Luthor's power ring and Orange Lantern abilities fade away.
- Hector Hammond (of Sector 2814): A long time enemy of Hal Jordan who is possessed by Ophidian after obtaining the Orange Lantern power battery.
- Krona (of Sector 0): During the War of the Green Lanterns, Krona was briefly able to take control of Larfleeze's ring and the other six rings, using them against the Green Lantern Corps, but the ring returned to its master after Hal Jordan killed Krona.
- Kyle Rayner (of Sector 2814): Rayner learned how to wield the power of all seven spectrums individually- mastering Avarice by getting past Larfleeze in a fight and recharging his ring from Larfleeze's battery- altering his appearance to match each, and elevating himself to White Lantern status once he mastered them all.

=== Entity ===
The avarice entity is called Ophidian, and takes the form of a snake. It was born as the first being to eat more than it needed; it had been contained within Larfleeze's power battery and it spoke to Hal Jordan when he briefly gained control of the battery. Ophidian, along with the other emotional entities, is hunted by Krona. Ophidian is sought by Hector Hammond, who in turn is receiving orders from Krona himself. When Larfleeze refuses to release the entity from the power battery, Hammond swallows the battery and is possessed by Ophidian.

Ophidian later allies with Krona, and with its disruptive powers, help the renegade Guardian of the Universe discover the location of the Butcher. Ophidian is seen attacking Oa alongside Krona, during which it possesses a Guardian of the Universe. Ophidian is freed from Krona's control after its Guardian host is killed and is left to freely roam the universe. During the "Green Lantern: Lights Out" storyline, Ophidian and the emotional entities are weakened by the emotional spectrum being drained and sacrifice themselves by passing into the Source Wall to repair the spectrum.

Ophidian returns in Green Lantern Corps (vol. 4), where the Green Lantern Corps free it and the other entities from the Source Wall to help combat Starbreaker.

=== The Book of Greed ===
The Book of Greed is a tome that documents the history of the Orange Lanterns. Due to Larfleeze being completely consumed by greed, the book is almost entirely blank.

== Other versions ==
- Larfleeze appears in Star Trek/Green Lantern: The Spectrum War.
- In the universe prior to the current one, groups managed to tap into the wellspring of power created by the Emotional Spectrum by using enormous converters and channeling that power into staffs in the same way the modern corps use rings. In this universe, those who harnessed the orange light were known as the Lightsmiths of the Orange Light of Gluttony. In an event that the Lightsmiths referred to as the Dimming, Axylund, the home planet of the blue Lightsmiths, faced the crisis of an obsolete light converter, cutting off azure energy to the Lightsmiths. Shortly after, the converters for the remaining Lightsmiths darkened as well until finally the universe died in an explosion of color, leaving only Relic to survive and 'warn' the next universe of its impending doom.

== In other media ==
=== Television ===
Larfleeze and the Orange Lantern Corps appear in a self-titled episode of Green Lantern: The Animated Series, voiced by Dee Bradley Baker.

=== Video games ===
- Larfleeze and the Orange Lantern Corps appear in DC Universe Online, voiced by Robert S. Fisher.
- Larfleeze appears as a character summon in Scribblenauts Unmasked: A DC Comics Adventure.
- Larfleeze and the Orange Lantern Corps appear as playable characters in Lego Batman 3: Beyond Gotham, voiced again by Dee Bradley Baker.
- Larfleeze appears as a playable character in DC Unchained.
- Larfleeze and the Orange Lantern Corps appear as playable characters in DC Legends.

=== Merchandise ===
- Larfleeze received a figure in the DC Comics Super Hero Collection's "Blackest Night" sub-line.
- Larfleeze received a figure in Mattel's DC Universe Signature Series.
- Larfleeze was produced as a single figure in McFarlane Toys' DC Multiverse seven inch collectible action figure line.
