= Black Hand (character) =

DC Comics character

- Black Hand as depicted in Green Lantern (vol. 5) #11 (July 2012), art by Doug Mahnke.

Publication information
- Publisher: DC Comics
- First appearance: Green Lantern (vol. 2) #29 (June 1964)
- Created by: John Broome; Gil Kane

In-story information
- Alter ego: William Derek Hand
- Team affiliations: Black Lantern Corps; Indigo Tribe; The Society; Underground Society; Suicide Squad; Injustice League
- Partnerships: Nekron; Scar
- Notable aliases: Dr. Wilbur Palm
- Abilities: Life force and power ring energy absorption; Wields a Black Lantern ring

Black Hand (William Derek Hand) is a supervillain and a recurring foe to Green Lantern. Originally introduced in 1964, Black Hand took on a more prominent role in the 2000s and 2010s as a leading member of the Black Lantern Corps.

== Publication history ==
Black Hand first appeared in Green Lantern (vol. 2) #29 (June 1964) and was created by John Broome and Gil Kane. He is based on and named after Bill Finger DC writer who co-created Batman and Alan Scott.

== Fictional character biography ==
William Hand is born an inventive genius. His family the Hands are renowned in Coastville (a suburb of Coast City, California). However, he grows to dislike them early in life. He feels the best way to distance himself from them, especially his three brothers (David, Peter and Joe), is to start a life of crime. After extensive study, he becomes an expert criminal and evades police continuously. William develops a penchant for speaking in old clichés. He also tends to break the fourth wall, speaking directly to the reader about his plans to confront Hal Jordan.

His criminal behavior escalates, and he becomes a costumed supervillain, dubbing himself "Black Hand" (an inside joke he conceives that refers to his status as the "black sheep" of the Hand family). In preparation for an inevitable battle with the Coast City-based Green Lantern (Hal Jordan), Hand makes his most noteworthy invention: a device capable of absorbing the residue of a Green Lantern power ring's energy from any object that it touches. Once fueled by this energy, his device can be used similar to a Green Lantern ring. During one crime spree, he uses his device to persuade the general public the items he has stolen have, in fact, never been touched.

For a while, he retires from a life of crime and attempts to run an adult theatre. This lifestyle change is disrupted by Guy Gardner and his girlfriend Ice. Black Hand develops a phobia of superheroes. While trying to reorganize his life into more peaceful pursuits, he encounters Justice League members at the World Trade Center restaurant and has a mental breakdown.

Shortly before the events of Green Lantern: Rebirth, Black Hand's device locates a spare power ring that Green Arrow holds in case of emergency. Hand tries to claim the ring for himself, but he is stopped by Green Arrow and Hal Jordan (who is serving as the Spectre). As Hand attempts to wield the power ring, the Green Arrow pins the villain's hand to the wall with an arrow, and the Spectre turns his hand to coal, remarking that now "he can live up to his name". Missing his right hand and insane from the trauma, Hand flees. After hearing of Hal Jordan's resurrection, he decides to live in the rebuilt Coast City to stay close to his foe. While on board an airplane, he is targeted and abducted by the Kroloteans, gremlin-like aliens. They perform experiments that enhance his powers and abandon him in a public park.

He is seen in the Infinite Crisis mini-series as a member of Alexander Luthor Jr.'s Secret Society of Super Villains and one of several heroes and villains observed by Kal-L and Superboy-Prime.

=== Infinite Crisis ===
Black Hand's origin is rewritten in the Secret Origin storyline of Green Lantern and further enhanced in the Blackest Night storyline. In this origin, William Hand's parents run a coroner's office and funeral home, the logo of which is the same symbol William eventually adopts at the beginning of his criminal career. While still a young boy, Hand has a severe preoccupation with death and the dead that includes implied necrophilic tendencies. No particular trauma or event seems to have inspired this; even as a toddler, William is deeply fascinated by death and dead people, calling them "pretty". It is implied that his first kiss was with a corpse. At first, William tries to control his urges by engaging in taxidermy, but his hobby becomes a source of concern after he kills the family dog in pursuit of his favored pastime. Subsequently, William is sent to psychologists for the remainder of his life with the Hand family. William simply shrugs off every attempt to "cure" him, learning how to hide the most prurient manifestations of his necrophilia and accept the role of the "black sheep".

As part of his newly written background, his energy-absorbing weapon is now portrayed as being built by Atrocitus, a fervent enemy of the Guardians of the Universe. Atrocitus comes to Earth looking for the being who will coordinate the events that come to be known as the Blackest Night; that being is revealed to be William Hand. Atrocitus locates and attacks Hand, believing the black power literally lies within his body. Atrocitus is stopped by Green Lanterns Hal Jordan and Sinestro, while Hand (encouraged by a strange voice) pockets the weapon and flees the scene. He is later seen breaking into a hospital morgue, trying to steal one of the corpses there. When he is confronted by a security guard, he uses the weapon to kill him, after which saying to himself that the death was 'good'.

The mysterious voice that tells Hand to steal Atrocitus' weapon for himself traps him under its thrall, influencing him into resenting the Green Lanterns. He believes that as they are beacons of light, they upset the perfect balance of darkness and death. Trying to extinguish the light of willpower but unwilling to fight Green Lantern while dressed in 'a suit and a tie', Hand sews himself a costume using a family cadaver pouch and begins calling himself "Black Hand". Jordan apparently never connects William and his energy-absorbing weapon to his earlier fight with Atrocitus. Never revealing his weapon's true origin, Black Hand continues to fight him over the years, retreating to a desecrated grave after each failure.

=== Blackest Night ===
While being transported to prison, Black Hand experiences a power surge that kills his guards. He begins having visions of the dead planet Ryut and the Black Power Battery. After the visions, he roams the desert, hearing "Death" calling to him. It instructs him to reclaim all the souls it has lost in the DC Universe, including Superman and Hal Jordan. Black Hand returns to his family's house, kills his two brothers, his mother, his father, and then finally commits suicide. While these events unfold, the Guardian Scar arrives at the Hand house. She pronounces that the self-sacrifice "pleases him" and regurgitates the first Black power ring, which reanimates Black Hand. She reveals that Hand is the physical embodiment of death, in the same manner that Ion is for willpower, Parallax is for fear, and the Predator is for love. Hand then announces that he will use his new power to finally extinguish the light.

Black Hand spies on Hal Jordan and the Flash as they pay their respects at the unmarked grave of Batman. After the two heroes depart, Black Hand unearths Batman's corpse and, speaking his own oath, begins the process of recruiting the deceased hero. While holding Bruce Wayne's skull, Black Hand tells the mysterious force behind the Black Lanterns (residing in Sector 666) that no one escapes death. He is later seen after Black Lanterns Elongated Man and Sue Dibny kill Carter Hall / Hawkman and Kendra Saunders / Hawkgirl. Hand enters the room and proclaims that Hawkman and Hawkgirl will not escape death this time. Two black rings fly from Batman's skull, and Hand commands the two fallen heroes to rise. Black Hand is also present when the Spectre is taken over by a black ring, gloating to the assembled magic users (such as Blue Devil and Zatanna) that their powers are useless against his "lord's" might.

When the Black Lantern's power levels finally reach one hundred percent, the Black Power Battery teleports itself to the outskirts of Coast City, right on top of the Hand Mortuary. Black Hand watches in delight as Nekron finally rises. More black rings recruit the bodies of the people who perished when Coast City was destroyed.

When Flash attempts to attack Nekron, Black Hand steps in, using Batman's skull as an "emotional tether" to weaken the heroes, inspiring such an intense emotional reaction that Nekron is able to release a new wave of black rings to 'recruit' the resurrected, such as Superman, Wonder Woman and Green Arrow. Jordan and Flash only just escape the same fate when Flash takes them both two seconds into the future to disrupt the rings' connection to them. The Black Lantern Corps are ultimately defeated when the White Entity is used to convert several Black Lanterns into White Lanterns before bringing Black Hand back to life when a white ring attaches to him, reviving him and forcing him to regurgitate several white rings, freeing the Anti-Monitor and destroying Nekron's physical form due to Hand serving as Nekron's tether to this plane of existence. He is later seen held in captivity by the Indigo Tribe, chained to the tribe's trademark power staff.

From Blackest Night #2, a back-up feature "The Book of the Black: The Burned-In Thoughts of William Hand" chronicles Black Hand's childhood memories and his own personal opinions regarding each of the seven colors of the Emotional spectrum. In the end, his thoughts of the Indigo Tribe turn out to be a scream after his capture, hoping to be released from the Tribe's captivity; but much of the text is in the Tribe's language, thereby remaining indecipherable, except for a few names and four translated phrases.

=== Brightest Day ===
Black Hand is later revealed to be in an unknown location on Earth somewhat trapped inside of Proselyte, the compassion entity, as the members of the Indigo Tribe gather around them.

When Indigo-1 and Black Hand confront Hal Jordan, Barry Allen, Sinestro, Saint Walker and Larfleeze, Black Hand explains that the ring has 'cured' him of William Hand's sickness. This prompts the others to realize that, with their rings, the Indigo Tribe cannot feel any emotion besides compassion. Hal implies that given Hand's role in the Blackest Night, other Indigo Tribe members may have committed evil deeds in the past. Although the Indigo Tribe offer to take the remaining emotional entities into protective custody, Hal rejects the offer, concluding that he cannot trust them in the search for the entities with this new information. Then the being responsible for abducting the emotional entities appears with Parallax, proclaiming that any who feel emotion cannot be trusted.

=== The New 52 ===
Black Hand confronted the imprisoned Hal Jordan on the Indigo Tribe homeworld, the Tribe having abducted Hal and Sinestro (who is now a Green Lantern once again) with the intention of converting Sinestro into one of the tribe. With his ring depowered, Hal tricked Black Hand into manifesting the green energy of willpower and using him as a battery to recharge Hal's ring; however, the charge was still limited compared to what the ring would have been capable of if recharged normally. Black Hand is freed when guardian Natromo destroys the Indigo Central Power Battery. When the battery is restored, Black Hand's indigo ring tries to reach him, but Black Hand kills himself rather than return to the Indigo Tribe. A Black Power Ring later emerges from his corpse, reviving him as a Black Lantern. Following his reanimation, he returns to Earth and murders everyone in a Chinese food restaurant and then raises his family from the dead to "have dinner" with him. He lays out his plan to kill and reanimate as many people as possible, reanimating his victims as undead murderers. Meanwhile, Sinestro takes Hal Jordan to the Book of the Black to reveal the plan of the Guardians of the Universe to replace the Green Lanterns Corps; as he opens the Book, Sinestro and Hal Jordan are sucked into it and drawn to Black Hand. Although Hal and Sinestro are able to destroy Black Hand's makeshift army of reanimated corpses by detonating Sinestro's old yellow power battery, they are unaware that Black Hand has witnessed a new prophecy in the Book of the Black: Hal Jordan will become the greatest Black Lantern. After trying to reanimate Hal's father, Black Hand is on the verge of being defeated by both Hal Jordan and Sinestro. The Guardians intervene, charging him up — which apparently grants him enough power to kill both his adversaries — before teleporting him in the Chamber of Shadows for unknown purposes "until he is needed".

When Black Hand was imprisoned in the Chamber of Shadows, he reanimated the elder Oan (who was killed by the Guardians) for information about where the Guardians have put him in, but is only told that the First Lantern is a danger for the universe. Later, Green Lanterns Simon Baz and B'dg are sucked into the Book of the Black and drawn to Black Hand. When they began battling Black Hand, he sends Simon to the Dead Zone where Hal and Sinestro are trapped. B'dg and the elder Oans subdue him to use his black ring to open a door to the Dead Zone to rescue Simon, but Sinestro unintentionally went with him, while Black Hand has vanished into the Dead Zone. Hal sacrifices himself to harness the power of the black ring, escape the Dead Zone, and stop the First Lantern Volthoom. When the power ring turns Hal into a Black Lantern, Black Hand's body disintegrates into dust.

Black Hand removes one of his own hands and takes one of Martin's in its place, hoping to kill Hal Jordan with his father's own hand.

Following the Forever Evil storyline, Black Hand raises a dead circus and its dead crowds to watch the stunt performers die. Hal Jordan interferes, but is not here to fight him and asks to ally themselves against the New Gods of New Genesis. Hal Jordan explains that New Genesis has stolen the entire Power rings for a weapon as the Life Equation for their pursuit. Black Hand agrees to aid him and returns the dead to their graves. In the battle, Black Hand unleashes the spirits of the fallen Green Lanterns to the ensuing battle against the New Genesis soldiers that occurs near the Source Wall. Black Hand stops the battle as the New Genesis soldiers surrounded them. He smirks to see the Source Wall was a mass grave. Black Hand reanimates the grave of the Source Wall to attack the New Genesis soldiers. Black Hand then enters the Boom Tube to invade New Genesis' homeworld. Suddenly, Black Hand's powers were being effected with the horde of the Source Wall that are being subsequently resurrected by the leader of New Genesis, Highfather, and his misuse of the Life Equation and his arms were being turned to stone. He blames Hal for his plight and fled to deep space via the Boom Tube.

In the aftermath, Black Hand is unable to raise the dead due to effects of the Source Wall. Black Hand arrives on an alien planet, turning everything he touches to stone. Hal arrives to confront Black Hand, who still blames Hal for his plight and attacks the rogue Green Lantern. Using his power Gauntlet, Hal manages to defeat him as Black Hand's stone touch is ineffective against it. Hal returns to the Source Wall with Black Hand and asks Relic, who had been studying the Source Wall, to find a way to undo Black Hand's power effects from the Source Wall. Relic reveals that there is something outward of the Source Wall that it can consume of any stone material to return to its origin. Black Hand awakens and attacks them, but is driven back into the Source Wall, which appears to consume him.

== Powers and abilities ==
=== Energy device ===
Black Hand possesses a device that can manipulate the energy of Green Lantern power rings. It can obtain this energy by directly draining it from a ring or through the residue a power ring gives off. Like power rings, however, the device needs to regularly replenish its energy to operate. Hand usually recharges his device during battles with Green Lanterns and has been shown to use it to help him locate nearby power rings. The device was later revealed as being Atrocitus' creation, though it was previously assumed that he invented it himself. In Secret Origin, this device was quoted as being a cosmic divining rod, designed by Atrocitus to locate William Hand and defend himself against Green Lantern interference.

=== Black power ring ===
After his suicide, Black Hand is reanimated by Scar when she releases the first Black power ring, making him the first Black Lantern. Reanimated by the ring, the head injury he inflicts upon himself during his suicide is erased, restoring his body to a working state. When the first Black power rings choose wearers, they present themselves to the deceased without a charge. The rings (which constantly ask for "flesh") are recharged by killing living beings and removing their hearts; each heart restores .01 percent power to every ring in the Corps. Black Lanterns are also able to read the emotions of the living as a colored aura that correlates to the emotional spectrum.

=== Indigo power ring ===
After being revived, Black Hand temporarily joins the Indigo Tribe and gains an Indigo power ring, with which he can heal others, teleport across great distances, and force compassion onto those who lack it.

== Other versions ==
- An alternate universe version of Black Hand appears in Flashpoint.
- Multiple Black Hands appear in Absolute Green Lantern as members of an intergalactic army called the Blackstars, with Hal Jordan temporarily becoming a member after killing Abin Sur until he is cured by Jo Mullein. Additionally, William "Bill" Hand appears in flashbacks as the bigoted police chief of Evergreen, Nevada who ran a protection racket before dying.

== In other media ==
- Black Hand appears in DC Universe Online, voiced by Gray Haddock.
- Black Hand appears as a character summon in Scribblenauts Unmasked: A DC Comics Adventure.
- Black Hand appears as a playable character in Lego Batman 3: Beyond Gotham, voiced by Liam O'Brien.
