= Blue Lantern Corps =

Fictional organization appearing in comics published by DC Comics

- Interior artwork from Blackest Night 0 (July 2009 DC Comics); Art by Doug Mahnke

Publication information
- Publisher: DC Comics
- First appearance: Green Lantern vol. 4 #25 (December 2007)
- Created by: Geoff Johns; Ethan Van Sciver

In-story information
- Member(s): Saint Walker; Former members: Sister Sercy; Brother Warth; Brother Hymn; Barry Allen; Hal Jordan; Kyle Rayner; B'Dg

Roster

The Blue Lantern Corps is a fictional organization appearing in American comic books published by DC Comics, beginning in 2007 in Green Lantern vol. 4 #25 (December 2007) by Geoff Johns and Ethan Van Sciver. Their powers, similar to those of other organizations based around the emotional spectrum, are fueled by the emotion of hope.

== Fictional group history ==
The Blue Lantern Corps is one of the nine corps empowered by a specific color of the emotional spectrum within the DC Universe, deriving power from the blue light of hope. The group was established by Ganthet and Sayd, who were banished from the Guardians of the Universe due to them willing to express emotions, unlike the other Guardians.

=== Rage of the Red Lanterns ===
In the Rage of the Red Lanterns storyline, the Green Lantern Corps are ambushed by the Red Lantern Corps. Hal Jordan, reeling from the effects of an attack from Laira, is healed by Saint Walker. Walker introduces himself to the Green Lanterns as the Blue Lantern of Sector 1. Though John Stewart is suspicious of Walker's intentions, Walker's ring creates an illusion based on Stewart's psyche, freeing him from the effects of the Red Lantern attack that caused it. With Stewart placated, Walker takes Jordan to Odym. Ganthet and Sayd ask Jordan to aid the Blue Lanterns in rescuing Sinestro from Atrocitus, as his survival is important in the upcoming War of Light.

Jordan reluctantly accepts Ganthet's request and goes with the Blue Lanterns to the Red Lantern's base on Ysmault. Along the way, Walker tells Jordan that the Green Lanterns are nothing but a police force, and that Jordan would lead the Blue Lanterns like no other. Though Jordan tells him he has no intention of leaving his Corps, the reader observes Walker telling Warth that it was imperative that Jordan become a Blue Lantern. On Ysmault, Jordan locates Sinestro but is promptly ambushed by the Red Lanterns. He's captured by Atrocitus' forces, and though Atrocitus tells Laira that Jordan's flesh and blood belong to her, her attack is interrupted by the arrival of the Sinestro Corps. Chaos ensues, during which Walker and Warth come to Jordan's aid. They are shown not only boosting Jordan's power, but also capably handling the two battling Corps. Warth easily keeps the two from fighting one another, while Walker keeps Atrocitus himself at bay. During the conflict, Laira is killed by Sinestro. Outraged, Jordan attacks Sinestro and is so overcome with rage that Laira's red power ring chooses him as its new host.

After the conclusion of Rage of the Red Lanterns, the Blue Lanterns and Jordan return to Odym. Jordan is unable to remove the blue power ring and finds that it was interfering with the use of his green power ring. Ganthet explains to Walker that they did say Jordan would lead the Blue Lanterns, but not as a Blue Lantern himself. As a Green Lantern, Jordan's will would have been capable of charging the entire Blue Lantern Corps. Sayd says that a new blue power ring will need to be made for Walker, as they are unable to remove his original one from Jordan. Ganthet tells Jordan that, in order to remove the ring, he must use it by finding something to hope for. Jordan leaves for Oa, and Ganthet tells Walker and Warth that they must continue to recruit others to their Corps. The Blue Lanterns have a new mission: to locate those who wield the indigo light, for hope and compassion must work together. On Oa, the Guardians find that they are unable to remove the blue power ring from Jordan as well. During a later battle with Larfleeze, Jordan's blue power ring continues to repeatedly ask him what he hopes for. In frustration, Jordan says that he hopes that once the battle with Larfleeze is over that it will stop asking him what he hopes for. The blue ring registers this as a sincere hope, recharges all of the Green Lantern Corps' power rings, and allows Jordan to subdue Larfleeze. After Jordan gains control of his ring, it removes itself from him and leaves to find a new recipient in Sector 2828.

=== Blackest Night ===
During the Blue Lanterns' struggle against Larfleeze, a number of black power rings come to Odym. Unable to detect any dead bodies on the planet's surface to attach themselves to, the rings hover in the sky, waiting for a death to occur. Under the influence of Jordan's green power ring, the Blue Lanterns' rings are charged by Jordan's willpower and capable of combating Larfleeze's constructs. The constructs suddenly disappear as Larfleeze finds himself being attacked by the reanimated corpses of his Orange Lanterns, now members of the Black Lantern Corps. Saint Walker, Ganthet, and Sayd join the team Jordan and Indigo-1 have assembled, and accompany them to recruit Larfleeze and Atrocitus. Despite saving him from the Black Lanterns, Larfleeze is resistant to join the group due to the nature of his power and an interest in obtaining his own Guardian. In order to secure his participation, Sayd offers him her servitude in return for his compliance.

While on Earth battling the Black Lanterns, Saint Walker's ring is activated by Ganthet to deputize Barry Allen as a Blue Lantern. The rest of the Blue Lantern Corps work with the Green Lantern Corps to destroy the millions of Black Lanterns coming from the destroyed planet Xanshi.

=== New 52 – The Fall of the Blue Lantern Corps ===
In September 2011, The New 52 rebooted DC's continuity. When Kyle Rayner becomes a 'magnet' for other power rings, Saint Walker is the only member of the other five Corps who shows up to help him rather than demanding his ring back, helping Kyle escape the others' attacks and travel to Oa to try and seek the aid of the Guardians. This plan backfires when it is revealed that Ganthet has been stripped of his emotions by the other Guardians, with him proclaiming that the Blue Lantern Corps was a mistake that he will now rectify. After Saint Walker returns to Odym, the Blue Lanterns are attacked by the Reach, enemies of the Lantern Corps, prompting Walker to send a desperate message for help to Kyle Rayner and the other New Guardians, while teaching other Blue Lanterns how to draw on their aura to enhance their defensive powers and fight back without a Green Lantern's presence.

== Prominent members ==
Hal Jordan as a member of two Lantern Corps in Green Lantern vol. 4,#38 (March 2009).

=== Leadership ===
- Ganthet and Sayd
- Saint Walker (of Sector 1): An alien from the planet Astonia who becomes the recipient of the first blue power ring after he aids his people in finding hope in spite of their sun's impending death. After becoming a Blue Lantern, Walker uses his powers to restore Astonia's sun.

=== Former members ===
- Brother Warth (Sector 2): A Ganesha-like alien who recruits others into the Blue Lantern Corps. He was killed in the battle with Relic.
- Brother Hynn (Sector 3): Shown in the midst of his selection process with Ganthet and Sayd at the end of the Rage of the Red Lanterns arc. He was killed in the battle with Relic.
- Sister Sercy (Sector 4): A religious figure from a planet long oppressed by Evil Star. She was killed in the battle with Relic.
- Brother Shon (Sector 11): The first new Blue Lantern to be named since DC's The New 52 reboot, Shon is introduced in The New Guardians as the Reach invade Odym. Shon's ring abandons him after he loses hope for the Blue Lantern Corps winning, and he falls to his death.
- Barry Allen (Sector 2814): Allen temporarily becomes a deputy Blue Lantern during the war against the Black Lantern Corps.
- Hal Jordan (Sector 2814): Normally a Green Lantern, Jordan became a Blue Lantern after Saint Walker gave him his power ring to free him from the influence of Laira's red ring.
- Nicole Morrison (Sector 2814): A human who became the host of Adara, the Blue Lantern entity.
- Kyle Rayner (Sector 2814)
- Guy Gardner (Sector 2814): In a potential future, Gardner joined the Blue Lantern Corps and worked with Bleez to battle the Red Lantern Corps.
- B'Dg (Sector 1014): Normally a Green Lantern, B'Dg became a Blue Lantern after temporarily losing his green ring.

== Oath ==
Just as the Green Lanterns and other Lantern Corps recharge their own rings, the following is the oath used by Blue Lanterns to recharge their blue power rings:

In fearful day, in raging night,
With strong hearts full, our souls ignite,
When all seems lost in the War of Light,
Look to the stars-- For hope burns bright!

— Ganthet and Sayd, in Green Lantern vol. 4 #36 (December 2008)

== Entity ==
Adara is the embodiment of hope, is connected to the blue light of the Emotional Spectrum, and is bird-like in appearance. It is first shown during the Blackest Night event as Sinestro, recently transformed into a White Lantern, recounts the creation of the emotional entities. Adara was created from the first act of prayer from a sentient being caught in a fierce storm. Like the other emotional entities, Adara was attracted to Earth by the Life Entity and is being hunted by Krona. Adara eventually chooses for its host a 14-year-old girl from Livonia, Michigan, named Nicole Morrison. Nicole had been kidnapped and after being possessed by Adara, confronted her abductor and forgave him.

Saint Walker brings Hal Jordan and Larfleeze to Nicole's location. Still possessed by Adara, Nicole appears to retain her sense of self, stating she is able to hear the hope in her parents' hearts as well as the crowd around them. Nicole goes on to say she can sense an emptiness in Larfleeze and tells him that his parents are still alive and they miss him. She also tells Jordan that he is afraid to hope and asks him why. Before Jordan can answer, the group is interrupted by the arrival of Barry Allen.

After Flash and Jordan discuss Jordan's recent actions, the Indigo Tribe appears with Proselyte and Black Hand, who appears to be brainwashed. Nicole confirms this, saying she senses no hope inside them. Tension grows about whose side the Indigo Tribe is really on. This is cut short when Krona appears and releases Parallax, who possesses the Flash. A battle erupts between Jordan and the Parallax-possessed Flash, during which Parallax, Proselyte, and Adara are separated from their hosts.

During the "Green Lantern: Lights Out" storyline, Adara and the emotional entities are weakened by the emotional spectrum being drained and sacrifice themselves by passing into the Source Wall to repair the spectrum.

Adara returns in Green Lantern Corps (vol. 4), where the Green Lantern Corps free it and the other entities from the Source Wall to help combat Starbreaker.

== Powers and abilities ==
All Blue Lanterns are armed with a blue power ring, fueled by the emotion of hope. While hope is the most powerful of the seven emotions, Blue Lanterns must be near an active Green Lantern's power ring to tap into their own rings' full power. Otherwise, the rings are only capable of the default abilities of flight and a protective aura. This is because the power of hope is nothing without the willpower to enact it. The Blue Lantern's protective aura allows them to survive in space and other hostile environments and can be manipulated to a limited degree even without a Green Lantern present, using it to augment their strength and extending it to form a larger shield, but this ability is almost exclusively defensive.

While under the influence of a nearby green power ring, a blue power ring has the same abilities as a green ring, as well as unique powers of its own. Blue Lanterns can heal wounds and regenerate lost body parts. A blue ring can negatively impact the performance of rings on the opposite side of the emotional spectrum, namely the red, orange, and yellow rings.

== Other versions ==
=== Star Trek/Green Lantern: The Spectrum War ===
In the crossover series Star Trek/Green Lantern, Pavel Chekov becomes a Blue Lantern after Ganthet transports one power ring from each Corps to the Star Trek universe.

== In other media ==
=== Television ===
- The Blue Lantern Corps appear in Green Lantern: The Animated Series, consisting of Ganthet, Saint Walker, and Brother Warth.
- Razer as a Blue Lantern appears in the Young Justice episode "Encounter Upon the Razor's Edge!".

=== Film ===
- Razer as a Blue Lantern appears in Justice League: Crisis on Infinite Earths.

=== Video games ===
- The Blue Lantern Corps appear in DC Universe Online.
- Saint Walker appears as a playable character in Lego Batman 3: Beyond Gotham.
- Saint Walker appears as a playable character in DC Legends.

=== Merchandise ===
- Saint Walker was featured in the Blackest Night series of the DC Comics Superhero Collection.
- A six-inch figure of Saint Walker was included in the Blackest Night toyline.
- A six-inch figure of Brother Warth was included in the Green Lantern series of action figures by DC Direct.
