= Sayd =

- Sayd in Hal Jordan and the Green Lantern Corps #18 (April 2017). Art by V. Ken Marion, Dexter Vines, and Dinei Ribeiro.

Publication information
- Publisher: DC Comics
- First appearance: Green Lantern: Rebirth #6 (May 2005)
- Created by: Joe Kelly; Geoff Johns; Ethan Van Sciver

In-story information
- Species: Maltusian
- Place of origin: Oa, formerly Maltus
- Team affiliations: Guardians of the Universe; Blue Lantern Corps; Agent Orange
- Abilities: Cosmic energy manipulation; Immortality; Telepathy; Telekinesis

Sayd is a fictional character in the DC Comics universe. She is a member of the Guardians of the Universe. Where most of the Guardians are void of emotion and rigid in their compliance to standard policy, Sayd's sensibilities are more in line with those of Ganthet, a Guardian known for his non-traditional mindset, and the two eventually marry.

== Fictional character biography ==
Sayd is one of the Guardians of the Universe, who were resurrected when Kyle Rayner reignited the Green Lantern central power battery. However, the Guardians are restored as children and are no longer exclusively male. Half of the twelve Guardians are female, with Sayd being among them.

=== Book of Oa ===
Sayd reads a forbidden chapter from the Book of Oa, which foretells of a prophecy of cosmic revelations: the Blackest Night. When the threat of the Sinestro Corps endangers the entire multiverse, Sayd addresses the incident to her colleagues as a sign of the Blackest Night. The other Guardians dismiss her concerns and ignore the prophecy, assuming it to be false or an attempt by their enemies, the Five Inversions, to spread fear among them. During the war with the Sinestro Corps, Sayd and Ganthet oppose the other Guardians' stance on the prophecy and attempt to stop them from burning the pages from the Book of Oa, though they are unsuccessful. Near the end of the war, Sayd and Ganthet are banished from the Guardians for being willing to express emotion, unlike their brethren. They both claim that as they are no longer Guardians, they cannot help defeat the Sinestro Corps, but will attempt to help how they can.

At the end of the Sinestro Corps War storyline, Ganthet and Sayd are shown living on the planet Odym. There, they harness the blue energy of hope, one of the lights of the emotional spectrum, and become the first members of the Blue Lantern Corps. The first recruit welcomed to their new Corps is Saint Walker, who assists them by beginning a chain of new Blue Lanterns inducted sector by sector.

=== Blackest Night ===
Ganthet, Sayd, and the Blue Lanterns are attacked by a platoon of Orange Lanterns led by a construct of Larfleeze, who has arrived on Odym to obtain a blue power ring. They are eventually rescued by Hal Jordan, who is accompanied by Carol Ferris, Sinestro, and Indigo-1. The reason for the Orange Lantern avatars disappearing is revealed to be the Black Lantern rings reviving Larfleeze's previous victims, forcing him to use his orange constructs to defend himself.

Saint Walker, Ganthet, and Sayd to locate the real Larfleeze and Atrocitus in their goal of gathering a member from each Corps in order to create the white light (composed of each of the seven lights of the emotional spectrum) that will destroy the Black Lantern Corps. Larfleeze demands his own Guardian after learning that the Green, Blue, and Black Lantern Corps each have one. In order to placate and recruit him to their cause, Sayd offers to relinquish her freedom and pledge her devotion to him if he agrees to accompany them.

=== Brightest Day ===
Sayd, now wearing a robe emblazoned with the symbol of avarice, is seen accompanying Larfleeze when he questions Lex Luthor. She has been investigating a strange disturbance that has been stealing rings from the different Lantern corps. Sayd travels to the center of Okaara's galaxy, where she finds a white hole acting as a gateway to another universe. A massive ship the size of a solar system, dubbed the Orrery, emerges from the hole.

Sayd is revealed to be the culprit of the ring thefts, a tactic used to bring the New Guardians together. She notes that Kyle Rayner is the only being she knows capable of bringing together the powers of all of the branches of the emotional spectrum.

== In other media ==
- Sayd appears in Green Lantern: The Animated Series, voiced by Susanne Blakeslee.

== See also ==
- Ganthet
