= Star Trek/Green Lantern =

Comic book series

Publication information
- Publisher: DC Comics; IDW Publishing
- Publication date: Series 1: July 2015 — December 2015; Series 2: December 2016 — May 2017
- No. of issues: Series 1: 6 Series 2: 6
- Main character(s): Green Lantern; Star Trek

Creative team
- Written by: Mike Johnson
- Penciller: Angel Hernandez

Star Trek/Green Lantern is the name of two American comic book limited featuring a crossover of characters from the Green Lantern and Star Trek franchises.

The first series, Star Trek/Green Lantern: The Spectrum War, was released from July to December 2015.

The second series, Star Trek/Green Lantern: Stranger Worlds, was released from December 2016 to May 2017.

The Star Trek characters include the Enterprise crew, depicted as they are in the J. J. Abrams trilogy.

== Plot ==
=== The Spectrum War ===
In an alternate DC universe, the last Guardian, Ganthet, exercises his power to take one each of the remaining power rings to another universe to escape Nekron, the embodiment of death, who has destroyed almost all life in the universe.

In the Star Trek universe, the crew of the Enterprise discover the remains of Ganthet and the power rings on a rogue planet. They accidentally activate the power rings even as they come under attack by a squad of Klingon ships under the command of General Chang. The blue, indigo, and violet rings find new owners among the crew of the Enterprise (Chekov, McCoy, and Uhura, respectively), while the yellow ring finds a new home with Chang. The red and orange rings head into space, eventually finding owners with the son of the leader of the Gorn Hegemony and the Praetor of the Romulan Empire, respectively.

Hal Jordan arrives, wondering why Ganthet's body is on board the Enterprise, and not long after, Carol Ferris (Star Sapphire) and an injured Saint Walker arrive. Meanwhile, Sinestro, Larfleeze, and Atrocitus are revealed to have survived and contact their respective rings' new owners.

A battle ensues, and it is discovered that three other Green Lanterns - John Stewart, Guy Gardner, and Kilowog - have survived the death of their universe, but what no one has counted on is that Nekron has also made his way to the new universe, and is determined to slaughter it as he did his own, and starts by restoring the destroyed planet Vulcan, and making Black Lanterns out of the populace.

Ultimately, Nekron is defeated by combining the ring energies. Sinestro, Atrocitus, and Larfleeze escape. The Green Lanterns, as well as Star Sapphire and Saint Walker, either join the crew of the Enterprise, or venture to the Earth of the Star Trek universe.

=== Stranger Worlds ===
The last Green Lanterns are dying without a power battery. In response to a distress call from Saint Walker, Hal Jordan and the U.S.S Enterprise arrive and find a Manhunter but are confronted by Sinestro. Captain Kirk believes the planet Oa might exist in the Star Trek reality but are attacked by Manhunters. Meanwhile John Stewart, Guy Gardner, and Kilowog investigate an ambush by Atrocitus at a Starfleet base. Khan kills and steals Atrocitus' ring and becomes a Red Lantern.

Sinestro reaches Oa and frees Parallax from the Green Power Battery. Khan forms his new Augments having escaped Starfleet custody and arrives at the Klingon planet to conquer it. The U.S.S Enterprise and Green Lanterns try to stop Khan and Sinestro, but the Lanterns have lost their power. Kirk gets a power ring to save the other lanterns.

== Reception ==
The comic received mostly positive reviews.
