= Ganthet =

Fictional character in Green Lantern franchise

- Ganthet as depicted in Green Lantern: Ganthet's Tale (1992). Art by John Byrne.

Publication information
- Publisher: DC Comics
- First appearance: Green Lantern: Ganthet's Tale (November 1992)
- Created by: Larry Niven (story); John Byrne (script and art)

In-story information
- Species: Maltusian
- Place of origin: Oa, formerly Maltus
- Team affiliations: Guardians of the Universe; Green Lantern Corps; Blue Lantern Corps; The Quintessence
- Abilities: Cosmic Force Manipulation; Vast Energy Manipulation; Vast Matter Manipulation; Reality Warping; Immortality; Invulnerability; Telepathy; Telekinesis; Power ring

Ganthet is a fictional character in the DC Comics universe, who first appeared in 1992 in Larry Niven and John Byrne's graphic novel Green Lantern: Ganthet's Tale (ISBN 1-56389-026-7). He is also Sayd's husband.

== Fictional character biography ==
Ganthet is one of the Guardians of the Universe, but much less stern and 'by-the-book' than most of his colleagues. He shows a human-like personality by displaying empathy, kindness, and concern for individuals, rather than thinking only of the Green Lantern Corps. In DC crossover limited series such as Kingdom Come, Ganthet is presented as being part of the Quintessence, a group of gods who oversee their entire universe (or multiverse), yet shows signs of focusing especially on Earth.

=== Ganthet's Tale ===
The graphic novel Ganthet's Tale by John Byrne (expanded from a story by Larry Niven) tells the story of Hal Jordan's first encounters with Ganthet. Jordan is asked to help him battle the renegade Guardian Dawlakispokpok (nicknamed Dawly), who is trying to use a time machine to change history. In the early era of the planet Oa, Krona attempted to use a device to see the beginning of time, and in using his time machine, 'bled' the universe of a billion years of its potential duration. Dawly intends to use another time machine to thrust Krona to the end of time, to prevent his following through with that plan; however, in battling Dawly, he learns that Dawly is responsible for the mishap of the universe being 'born old'. When Dawly's family is brought before the Guardians, Ganthet shields Jordan's mind, allowing him to retain his memory of one of the biggest secrets of the Guardians.

=== Emerald Twilight ===
After the destruction of Coast City during the "Reign of the Supermen" storyline, Ganthet becomes the last of the Guardians after Hal Jordan is driven insane and kills the rest. Ganthet creates a new Green Lantern ring from Jordan's ring and goes to Earth. He appears before Kyle Rayner and hastily hands him the ring, muttering "You shall have to do". During Rayner's first few months as Green Lantern, Ganthet is unsatisfied with him and attempts to take back the ring. Kyle eventually earns the respect of Ganthet by facing Parallax without his ring.

=== Ion and the new Guardians ===
When Kyle Rayner becomes Ion, he possesses more power than Hal Jordan did as Parallax. Realizing that he cannot continue as Ion without losing his humanity, Kyle travels to Oa to recharge the Central Power Battery. By doing so, he creates a new set of Guardians in the form of small children, intending for Ganthet to teach them how to be better Guardians than their predecessors.

When the Martian Manhunter reverts to Fernus, the 'Burning Martian' identity that the Guardians of the Universe had locked away long ago, and attacks the Justice League, Ganthet teleports John Stewart to safety. Ganthet tells John the history of the Burning Martians and teach him a way to 'reroute' his mind to think in the first language of the universe so that he could rescue his teammates from Fernus in a hit-and-run attack.

=== Sinestro Corps War ===
During the "Sinestro Corps War", Ganthet and Sayd are banished from the Guardians of the Universe for embracing emotions, discovering that they have romantic feelings for each other. Just as Parallax attacks the Lanterns, Ganthet and Sayd arrive and draw Parallax into four separate lanterns, reasoning that the Earth Lanterns had proven their superior ability to overcome fear and the division would prevent anyone from being able to release Parallax again. Ganthet and Sayd go on to found the Blue Lantern Corps, a group powered by the blue light of hope, with Saint Walker and Brother Warth being the first two members.

Ganthet and Sayd then seek Atrocitus and Larfleeze's aid to recreate the "white light of creation" with their saviors. To get Larfleeze to cooperate with them, Sayd offers her servitude to Larfleeze, who expresses a desire of having his own Guardian over Ganthet's protests. Ganthet and Sayd later arrive at Coast City with the Lanterns to aid Earth's heroes. Failing that, Ganthet duplicates Hal Jordan's ring for his own use. Ganthet and Sayd also duplicate the other Lantern Rings, allowing the other six corps to gain temporary 'deputies' to fight alongside the seven already present until the rest of the Corps can arrive.

=== Brightest Day ===
Ganthet is seen plotting with Guy Gardner and Atrocitus a new, universe-saving plan against a new, hidden foe. To further advance his new cause, Ganthet renounces his Guardian status, requesting his fellow Oans to fill in the permanent post of Green Lantern of Sector 0, forging his own lantern and power ring in the process. Ganthet is later forced to assist Hank Henshaw, who has learned from the hidden foe that Ganthet is apparently the key to Henshaw's permanent death. By threatening to make the Alpha Lanterns kill themselves if Ganthet does not cooperate, Henshaw makes Ganthet operate several Alpha Lanterns to try to restore them to organic life-forms, believing that the process, once perfected, can be used to return him to a mortal body.

=== War of the Green Lanterns ===
Krona returns Parallax to the Green Lantern power battery and infecting the other six remaining Guardians with the other emotional entities, Ganthet, Kilowog, and the four Earth-based Green Lanterns prove resistant to Parallax's influence due to their prior experience under his influence, but he is still forced to take John and Kyle's rings when they are driven to attack each other. When Ganthet takes their rings and his own, the three rings explode, destroying his hand. Ganthet is later visited by Saint Walker, who restores his hand.

=== The New 52 ===
Following the "War of the Green Lanterns" storyline, to compensate for the new shortage of Guardians, the other Guardians strip Ganthet of his emotions so that he will re-join their ranks. Kyle Rayner comes to Oa for help after something has turned him into a 'ring magnet', causing rings from the other six Corps to try to latch on to him. Kyle likens Ganthet's transformation to a lobotomy, though Ganthet disputes this. After Kyle is briefly overwhelmed by the other rings he wields, his green ring throws Ganthet aside when he attempts to remove it. As the other Lanterns attempt to help Kyle, Saint Walker appeals to Ganthet for help, but Ganthet throws Walker off, regarding the Blue Lantern Corps as a mistake that must be rectified.

When the First Lantern Volthoom is freed, he imprisons the Guardians on the planet Maltus and restores their emotions to their original state. Ganthet comes to feel shame for his actions and for his battle with Kyle. After Volthoom is killed, the Guardians are freed. Shortly afterward, the Guardians are killed by Sinestro, who spares only Ganthet and Sayd.

=== DC Rebirth ===
While the Green Lantern Corps are reinstated, Ganthet and Sayd assign Hal and Kyle to find Saint Walker. After they bring Walker back to the base of the Green Lantern Corps, they call Kyle to test his White Lantern power, which they believe could restore the Blue Lantern Corps. When Walker attempts a psionic link to Kyle's power, he is prevented from doing so by an unknown presence.

== Other versions ==
In the crossover series Star Trek/Green Lantern, Ganthet is killed by Nekron, who had killed all of the other Guardians and destroyed the six other Corps. He transports himself and the last power rings to the Star Trek universe before dying.

== In other media ==
=== Television ===
Ganthet as he appears in Green Lantern: The Animated Series.

- Ganthet appears in the Duck Dodgers episode "The Green Loontern", voiced by John Stephenson.
- Ganthet appears in Green Lantern: The Animated Series, voiced by Ian Abercrombie.

=== Film ===
Ganthet as he appears in the 2011 film Green Lantern.

- Ganthet appears in Green Lantern: First Flight, voiced by Larry Drake.
- Ganthet appears in Green Lantern: Emerald Knights, voiced by Michael Jackson.
- Ganthet appears in Green Lantern (2011).
- Ganthet appears in Green Lantern: Beware My Power, voiced by Jason J. Lewis.

=== Video games ===
- Ganthet appears in Mortal Kombat vs. DC Universe, voiced by Michael McConnohie.
- Ganthet appears in Green Lantern: Rise of the Manhunters, voiced again by Michael Jackson.
- Ganthet appears as a character summon in Scribblenauts Unmasked: A DC Comics Adventure.
- Ganthet appears as an NPC in Lego DC Super-Villains, voiced by Brian George.
