= White Lantern Corps =

Fictional organization appearing in comics published by DC Comics

- White Lanterns

Publication information
- Publisher: DC Comics
- First appearance: Blackest Night #7 (April 2010)
- Created by: Geoff Johns (writer); Ivan Reis (artist)

In-story information
- Member(s): Kyle Rayner; Simon Baz; Sinestro; Ice; Deadman

The White Lantern Corps is a fictional organization appearing in comics published by DC Comics, related to the emotional spectrum. Founded during the Blackest Night event, the members of the White Lantern Corps are powered by the white light of life and are the opposite of the Black Lantern Corps, which represent death.

== Publication history ==
The White Lantern Corps first appeared in Blackest Night #7 and was created by Geoff Johns and Ivan Reis.

== Fictional team history ==
Sinestro becomes the first White Lantern after bonding with the Life Entity, the embodiment of life itself. However, the Entity is removed from Sinestro by Nekron, and then claimed by Hal Jordan who, joined by the Flash, use its power to rescue Superman, Superboy, Wonder Woman, Donna Troy, Ice, Animal Man, Kid Flash, and Green Arrow, who had all been turned into Black Lanterns by Nekron, as well as the Anti-Monitor. Jordan uses the power of the Entity to sever Black Hand, Nekron's tether to the living world. The revived Black Hand regurgitates twelve white rings that destroy Nekron's body and resurrect Martian Manhunter, Aquaman, Deadman, Hawkman, Hawkgirl, Jade, Firestorm, Osiris, Hawk, Maxwell Lord, Captain Boomerang, and Professor Zoom.

The Entity tells Deadman that it is dying, and that he needs to find the "chosen one" to replace it; this becomes Deadman's assigned task. Deadman considers Hal Jordan to be the perfect candidate, and tells the Entity to take him to him. Instead of taking him to Hal Jordan, the White Lantern Ring takes Deadman and Dove to Aquaman and Mera. Aquaman explains what the White Lantern has told him: to find Jackson Hyde. Deadman questions why the Lantern has taken him to Aquaman when he should be searching for the Entity's replacement, and the ring replies that to find the new Entity, Deadman must help all the other resurrected complete their tasks. Aquaman understands what is at hand and explains to Deadman that for him to succeed, he must find and help others and explain to them what needs to happen. Meanwhile, the White Lantern is acquired by Deathstorm (the Black Lantern version of Firestorm) who, by infecting it with his essence, is able to generate Black Lantern duplicates of the twelve heroes and villains resurrected by the Entity, apparently with the goal of preventing the resurrected from completing their tasks.

Deadman commands the ring to resurrect the two heroes, but the ring refuses, saying that this is part of the Entity's plan. It is revealed that when Nekron attacked the Earth, not only was the Entity mortally wounded, but the contamination of the planet was also heightened. Furthermore, the corruption will rise up in the form of another "dark avatar" of the darkness who will try to destroy the Star City forest, which is the key to save Earth's soul. The Entity resurrects the twelve characters with different purposes. Some of them, like Hawk, Maxwell Lord and Jade, are supposed to prevent further disasters and give Deadman and the Entity more time. Aquaman, Firestorm, Martian Manhunter, Hawkman, and Hawkgirl are resurrected in order to overcome what held them back in life. Thus, their life force is purified and the ring takes their essences back because they are essential in saving Earth. Deadman also has a secondary purpose: to supply the white ring with power by embracing life.

When the "Dark Avatar" makes his presence known, Deadman is forced to collect Firestorm's essence, turning him into one of the Elementals. Aquaman, Martian Manhunter, Hawkman, and Hawkgirl are also revealed to be part of the Elementals, which guard the forest located in Star City. They have been transformed by the Entity to represent the elements of Water (Aquaman), Fire (Firestorm), Earth (Martian Manhunter), and Wind (Hawkman and Hawkgirl). The elementals protect the Star City Forest from the "Dark Avatar", which is revealed to be Swamp Thing corrupted into a Black Lantern. After Swamp Thing is returned to normal, the Entity restores the elementals to their normal selves.

=== The New 52 ===
In September 2011, The New 52 rebooted DC's continuity. In this new timeline, the events of the "Rise of the Third Army" storyline has Kyle Rayner unite the powers of all seven Corps to stop the latest threat, despite Kyle's uncertainty about his ability to channel the powers. After Kyle has mastered the seven powers of the emotional spectrum, he is transformed into a White Lantern with the ability to destroy some members of the Third Army, and now will apparently be able to stop the threat of the Guardians of the Universe. Later, Kyle and Carol Ferris arrive at the destroyed planet Korugar, the homeworld of Sinestro. Sinestro attacks them both, blaming them that his home planet is destroyed by the villainous First Lantern. He notices that Kyle has become a White Lantern and demanded that Korugar be restored, but Kyle fails to resurrect Korugar. Sinestro struggles with Kyle for the white ring, attempting to become a White Lantern himself, but the ring rejects him. The white ring then comes into the possession of Simon Baz, but he is rejected as well. The white ring then returns to Kyle's ownership.

After he absorbs the power of the Life Equation when passing through the Source Wall to defeat Relic, Kyle realizes that his power has grown too great for him to keep it all under control and that he would die very soon because of it, caused him to create the 'Oblivion' entity to destroy himself so that he cannot endanger anyone else. However, various other ring-wielders (including Carol and the repowered Saint Walker) band together and convince him to have hope, resulting in Kyle working with the Templar Guardians to split his ring into seven rings, each finding a new wearer who will wield part of the Life Equation without risking being corrupted by that power (with the option of recombining into one ring in a time of great crisis).

== Powers and abilities ==
A White Lantern Power Ring

Each White Lantern possesses a power ring that lets the user create white energy constructs powered by life itself. The original wielder of the Entity, Sinestro, displays the ability to eradicate swarms of Black Lanterns effortlessly and is described as "godlike". He also appears to survive a seemingly fatal wound from which he recovers within minutes. When Hal Jordan wields the power, he demonstrates the ability to create additional rings and restore heroes claimed by Nekron to life.

When Deadman possesses a white ring, he demonstrates the ability to resurrect a dead bird. He is also able to transform the area of land devastated by Prometheus into a lush forest. However, this seems to be the work of the Entity, as Deadman had been unable to access the ring's powers himself.

A green ring can be altered to function like a white ring if the user masters the emotional spectrum. This version of the ring is similar to a much more powerful version of the standard green ring, and ignores the Third Army's resistance to Lantern constructs, but displays no other special properties.

As a White Lantern, Kyle Rayner briefly had the Life Equation within his ring and could use the power of the entire spectrum. Eventually, he had to split the Life Equation into seven parts and placed into Kyle's and six newly created white power rings and sent the rings out to choose their new bearers. These seven rings can be brought together to restore the Life Equation if needed.

== Members ==
- Saysoran of Sector (unknown)
- Tallahe of Sector (unknown) - Resident of Fifth Sline Seven.
- Mehenash Exeter of Space Sector (unknown) - Resident of Kalimawa.
- Romgan Shay of Sector (unknown) - Resident of the Nest who is inducted into the White Lantern Corps.
- Telos Usr of Sector 1760 - A Daxamite who is inducted into the White Lantern Corps.
- Earth of Sector 2814 - The Justice League used the Totality to defeat the Ultraviolet Lantern Corps. The result of this meant that Earth itself was inducted into the White Lantern Corps.

=== Former members ===
- Kyle Rayner of Sector 2814 - After mastering the seven colors of the emotional spectrum into his own ring, Kyle created the white light and became a White Lantern. However, he eventually gives up his power and becomes a Green Lantern again.
- Simon Baz of Sector 2814 – Chosen by the white ring itself, but found him unsuitable after an attempt to restore Sinestro's home planet Korugar.
- Sinestro of Sector 1417 – Possessed by the Entity and discharged from the Corps after Nekron removed the Entity from him. During the events of "Wrath of the First Lantern", Sinestro tries to become a White Lantern once again so he could reconstruct his home planet of Korugar and resurrect all its inhabitants, stealing Kyle Rayner's white ring, but the ring found him unsuitable as a host.
- Swamp Thing of Sector 2814 – The Chosen One that took the Entity's place.
- Hal Jordan of Sector 2814 – Possessed by the Entity. Discharged from the Corps after Nekron's defeat.
- Superman of Sector 2813 – Discharged from the Corps after Nekron's defeat.
- Green Arrow of Sector 2814 – Discharged from the Corps after Nekron's defeat.
- Kid Flash of Sector 2814 – Discharged from the Corps after Nekron's defeat.
- Superboy of Sector 2814 – Discharged from the Corps after Nekron's defeat.
- Wonder Woman of Sector 2814 – Discharged from the Corps after Nekron's defeat.
- The Flash of Sector 2814 – Discharged from the Corps after Nekron's defeat.
- Donna Troy of Sector 2814 – Discharged from the Corps after Nekron's defeat.
- Ice of Sector 2814 – Discharged from the Corps after Nekron's defeat.
- Animal Man of Sector 2814 – Discharged from the Corps after Nekron's defeat.
- Batman of Sector 2814 – Chosen by Deadman, but discharged after the ring reveals that Batman is not the heir to the White Light.
- Deadman of Sector 2814.

== Entity ==
The Life Entity is the embodiment of the white light that creates life. It assumes the shape of a massive winged humanoid creature and resides inside the Earth. The Life Entity is the source of all life and the parent of the emotional entities.

== Other versions ==
- In the alternate timeline of the "Flashpoint" event, the Life Entity slumbers deep beneath the Earth's surface. Concerned for the Entity's safety, the Guardians of the Universe order Abin Sur to retrieve it and bring it back to Oa before Earth is destroyed. When Abin arrives on Earth, he refuses to look for the Entity until after he helps Earth's superhumans stop the Atlantis/Amazon war. The Guardians grow impatient with Abin and discharge him from the Corps. During the final battle of the Atlantis/Amazon war, a device triggered by the Atlanteans triggers an earthquake. Abin leaps into a crevice in an attempt to stop the destruction, only for his ring to run out of power. The Entity then awakens and joins with Abin, turning him into a White Lantern and giving him the power to restore Earth.
- In the six-part comics miniseries produced jointly by IDW Publishing and DC Comics, Star Trek/Green Lantern, it is revealed that Nekron was reborn at some future point and unleashed an army of the dead on the universe. When only a few survivors are left, Ganthet triggers the 'Last Light' protocol to transfer all remaining ring-wielders to another universe - specifically, the alternate universe of Star Trek - but Nekron follows them through. James T. Kirk is inspired to have Spock wield various excess rings transferred through with Ganthet, allowing him to unleash the Life Entity and defeat Nekron once again. Additionally, Montgomery Scott is able to analyse the various spare rings and replicate his own version of the white ring.

== In other media ==
- Kyle Rayner as a White Lantern appears as a playable character in Lego Batman 3: Beyond Gotham.
- The White Lantern Corps appear in Scribblenauts Unmasked: A DC Comics Adventure, consisting of Captain Boomerang, Deadman, Jade, Martian Manhunter, and Maxwell Lord.
