= Nekron =

DC Comics supervillain

- Nekron as depicted in Blackest Night #6 (December 2009). Art by Rodolfo Migliari.

Publication information
- Publisher: DC Comics
- First appearance: Tales of the Green Lantern Corps #2 (June 1981)
- Created by: Mike W. Barr (writer); Len Wein (writer); Joe Staton (artist)

In-story information
- Full name: Nekron
- Team affiliations: Black Lantern Corps
- Partnerships: Krona; Scar; Black Hand
- Notable aliases: Lord of the Unliving
- Abilities: Draws power from and commands the souls and spirits of all who have ever died.: Darkness manipulation; Dark energy manipulation; Necromancy; Godly strength; Invulnerability; Fatal touch; Soul manipulation; Matter manipulation; Energy manipulation; Dimensional manipulation; Dark lightning; Telepathy; Reality warping; Size alteration; Immortality

Nekron is a supervillain appearing in comic books published by DC Comics, primarily as an enemy of the Green Lantern Corps. Created by Mike W. Barr, Len Wein and Joe Staton, the character, who exists as an embodiment of Death, first appeared in Tales of the Green Lantern Corps #2 (June 1981). He is the primary antagonist in the 2009–2010 Blackest Night storyline.

== Fictional character biography ==
=== Origins ===
Nekron, as he first appeared in Tales of the Green Lantern Corps #2. Art by Joe Staton.

Nekron is the personification of Death and ruler of a region adjoining Hell known as the Land of the Unliving. It is where the souls of the dead await passage to their final residence in either the Silver City or Hell. Nekron draws his power from the souls and spirits of the dead.

After the Oan scientist Krona is sentenced to banishment as pure energy, his energy reaches Nekron's realm, opening a rift between dimensions. Desiring the living world he is now able to see, but being too large to pass through the rift, Nekron recreates Krona as an undead being of enormous power instead. Given an army of similarly-restored spirits, Nekron sends Krona to kill the Guardians of the Universe to increase the size of the rift. Krona cooperates because part of Nekron's plan involves collapsing the universe so as to recreate it according to his own desires. Krona and his minions kill several Guardians and Green Lanterns while destroying the Central Power Battery to prevent the Lanterns from recharging their power rings. Although his attack is powerful enough to shatter the morale of the Green Lantern Corps, Hal Jordan manages to inspire and rally his fellow Lanterns into attacking Krona with the charge still left in their rings. Nekron is defeated when Jordan enters the realm of the dead and incites the spirits of the recently killed Lanterns to rebel against him. This distraction undercuts Krona's power supplied by the being and thus gives the Guardians enough time to banish Krona into the dead realm and close the rift with Jordan still trapped inside. The spirit of Jordan's predecessor, Abin Sur, helps him escape the realm.

=== 1990 – 2002 ===
Captain Atom has a run-in with Nekron in which Nekron is described as "Death as the Ultimate Opponent". Black Racer, also making an appearance, is coined "Death as an Inevitability", while Death represents "Death as the Release, as Mercy, as Compassion". Drawing into the Quantum field, Captain Atom is able to get the better of Nekron and is able to visit his deceased wife.

Nekron later battles the demon Nebiros, following the destruction of Doctor Fate's Tower of Fate. Also appearing in this issue is Jared Stevens (Fate).

Kyle Rayner later encounters Nekron when he nearly reenters the living universe, at a time when the level of supernatural activity mysteriously increases. This gives Nekron the opportunity to briefly control every deceased member of the Green Lantern Corps, which act as both his army and his anchor to the living universe. Kyle pushes Nekron back into his dimension by freeing the undead Lanterns from Nekron's control. The rift is sealed following Nekron's defeat.

=== "Blackest Night" ===
In the Blackest Night storyline, Nekron is revealed to be responsible for the creation of the black power rings, which reanimate the dead, and is collaborating with Scar and Black Hand. He is also responsible for the capture of the Anti-Monitor during the aftermath of the Sinestro Corps War on the planet Ryut. When the Black Lanterns' power levels reach one hundred percent, Nekron is summoned just outside Coast City. Nekron is also revealed to be the mastermind behind the miraculous resurrections of several superheroes in the past, a deed previously thought to be a consequence of Brother Blood tampering with the forces of life and death.

According to Black Lantern Jean Loring, Nekron was formed out of the nothingness in existence prior to the creation of the universe as a defense mechanism to the Life Entity, also known as the White Light. Given shape in the form of life's idea of death, Nekron marches with his undead army, claiming the hunger plaguing him has not abated. Nekron is not a living being, instead existing as an avatar of darkness.

After questioning one of the Guardians of the Universe and getting him to admit that he can no longer remember why the Guardians took a vow to protect the universe, Nekron slits his throat and Black Hand uses his organs to summon the Life Entity. When Nekron strikes the Entity, every living thing in the universe is harmed because the Entity is the source of all life. Nekron intends to kill the Entity and thereby kill every living thing in the universe. His plans, however, are thwarted when Sinestro bonds with the Entity and becomes a White Lantern. The Life Entity abandons Sinestro, refusing to be controlled by his ego, and bonds itself to Hal Jordan, who states that Nekron merely opened the doors between life and death while it was still the heroes' choices to return to life. Having restored all the resurrected heroes to life and recruited them to the White Lantern Corps, Hal turns the power of the Entity on Black Hand, resurrecting him. Black Hand vomits a white power ring that enters the Black Power Battery and resurrects the Anti-Monitor, who attacks Nekron. Black Hand releases twelve other white rings that seek out several deceased heroes and villains who had been recruited into the Black Lantern Corps, restoring them to life. In the final confrontation that follows, Nekron is banished yet again.

=== "Brightest Day" ===
At the conclusion of the miniseries Brightest Day, Swamp Thing appears, grown to towering size and emerging from the forest at the former heart of Star City, which has become corrupted. The Life Entity explains that just as the memories of Alec Holland acted as a template for the Earth Elemental, the personality of Nekron has been imprinted over it. The corrupted Swamp Thing does battle with Holland and defeats him with help from Hawkman, Hawkwoman, Firestorm, Aquaman and Martian Manhunter, driving out Nekron's influence.

=== The New 52 ===
In Wrath of the First Lantern, Hal Jordan kills himself to harness the power of Black Hand's ring, escape the Dead Zone, and stop the First Lantern Volthoom. After a fierce battle, Jordan summons Nekron to destroy Volthoom for good. A nearby Green Lantern ring chooses Jordan to be its user and resurrects him.

=== DC Rebirth ===
During DC Rebirth, Nekron returns and confronts Volthoom, allowing him to sing within the Dead Zone. After recounting his history to Nekron, Volthoom pleads with him to end his life. However, Nekron reveals that he cannot due to Volthoom's bond with the emotional spectrum, meaning that as long as there is light in the universe, Volthoom will never die.

== Powers and abilities ==
The limitations of Nekron's powers are unknown. Geoff Johns has described him as the most powerful dark force in the DC Universe. He has displayed the ability to raise the dead, kill anyone with a touch, generate black lightning, and grow to a colossal size. Additionally, he is incredibly durable, being able to withstand a blast from the Anti-Monitor.

== Other versions ==
- An alternate universe version of Nekron appears in Flashpoint.
- An alternate universe version of Nekron appears in Star Trek/Green Lantern.

== In other media ==
- Nekron appears as a boss in DC Universe Online.
- Nekron appears as a character summon in Scribblenauts Unmasked: A DC Comics Adventure.
- Nekron appears in DC Legends.
