= Saint Walker =

DC Comics character

- Saint Walker as depicted on the cover of Hal Jordan and the Green Lantern Corps #14 (February 2017); art by Rafael Sandoval and Jordi Tarragona.

Publication information
- Publisher: DC Comics
- First appearance: Green Lantern (vol. 4) #25 (January 2008)
- Created by: Geoff Johns; Ethan Van Sciver

In-story information
- Alter ego: Bro'Dee Walker
- Species: Astonian
- Place of origin: Astonia
- Team affiliations: Blue Lantern Corps; Green Lantern Corps; New Guardians; Justice League
- Notable aliases: Blue Lantern; Adara
- Abilities: Use of power ring grants: Regenerate and heal lost body parts; Generation of hard light constructs; Flight; Force field generation; Rage immunity; Energy blasts; Hope inducement; Energy aura; Energy manipulation; Energy absorption; Universal translator; Interstellar travel (survival at space); Dimensional travel; Holographic playback/protection; Electromagnetic scanning; Nullification of Red Lanterns; Energy draining of Yellow Lanterns

Saint Walker (Bro'Dee Walker) is a fictional comic book character appearing in American comic books and other associated media published by DC Comics. He is an alien member of the galactic Blue Lantern Corps, an organization dedicated to spreading peace and harmony through the power of hope.

== Publication history ==
Saint Walker first appeared in Green Lantern (vol. 4) #25 and was created by writer Geoff Johns and artist Ethan Van Sciver. His name is derived from Green Lantern fan Brady Walker.

== Fictional character biography ==
Bro'dee Walker is a priest living on the planet of Astonia with a wife and two children. Astonia is doomed, as its ancient sun is dying. Walker manages to calm his despairing people and give them hope in the face of extinction. A power ring chooses him to become a member of the Blue Lantern Corps, stating that he "has the ability to instill great hope". With his ring, Walker sets his sun's age back 8.9 billion years, thereby saving Astonia.

Saint Walker and his fellow Blue Lanterns are introduced during the Final Crisis event as part of the build-up to the Blackest Night storyline. During the Final Crisis, Hal Jordan and John Stewart of the Green Lantern Corps are ambushed by the Red Lantern Corps, who take the rogue former Green Lantern Sinestro from their custody. Jordan is injured during the conflict, and his wounds are healed when he first comes into contact with Saint Walker.

In the Blackest Night storyline, having joined Hal Jordan's and Indigo-1's efforts to rally one member of each Corps to attempt to destroy the Black Lantern power battery, Saint Walker agrees to use his power ring to ease Larfleeze's hunger while they work together. When deputizing an Earth hero to assist in the current crisis until the rest of the Blue Lantern Corps can arrive, Walker's ring selects Barry Allen as a temporary Blue Lantern. After Nekron is defeated, Walker works with Carol Ferris to heal Mera of the influence of her red power ring.

In Justice League of America (vol. 2) #55 (2011), Saint Walker joins the titular team in battling Eclipso and attempts to assist the resurrected Hank Henshaw against Doomsday on Batman's orders.

In the War of the Green Lanterns storyline, Saint Walker and the rest of the New Guardians make their way to the planet Ryut. Krona and the emotional entities are nowhere to be found but the group does come upon the Book of the Black. When former Sinestro Corps member Lyssa Drak appears, she quickly subdues the New Guardians, trapping all but Hal in the Book of the Black. Hal escapes with the rings of the New Guardians, later passing Walker's ring on to Kyle Rayner when Krona infects the Central Power Battery with Parallax to bring the Green Lantern Corps under his influence. In the final battle, Walker is freed from the book by Kyle. His blue ring returns to him and the Guardians of the Universe return him to Odym.

=== The New 52 ===
In the series Green Lantern: New Guardians, Saint Walker assists Kyle Rayner when he becomes a "magnet" for other power rings, helping Kyle escape the attacks of the other four Corps members who have tracked the rings. They travel to Oa to try to seek the aid of the Guardians. This plan backfires when it is revealed that Ganthet has been stripped of his emotions by the other Guardians, to the extent that he attacks Walker when Walker tries to help Kyle directly after he is briefly overwhelmed by the rings. Ganthet proclaims that the Blue Lantern Corps was a mistake that he will now rectify. After being forced to escape the Guardians, Walker heals Arkillo's severed tongue using an illusion of Sinestro. In the subsequent confrontation with Archangel Invictus, Walker is unable to heal Invictus' anger at the Lanterns, although his actions help Invictus see that the Lanterns are not completely tainted. Returning to Odym to regroup after Invictus releases the New Guardians only if they agree to kill Larfleeze, Walker learns that Odym is being attacked by the Reach, forcing him to call the other New Guardians for help when he attempts to teach the other Blue Lanterns how to channel their auras to increase their offensive capabilities so that they can fight on their own. Although he and the other New Guardians aid Kyle against Invictus, the team splits up after learning that Sayd was responsible for drawing the rings to Kyle as part of a plan to assemble a team to save Ganthet, feeling that her actions have tainted the team before it began, regardless of her motives in bringing them together.

Following the defeat of the Third Army and the fall of the Guardians, the Blue Lantern Corps relocate to the planet Elpis. They are soon attacked by the cosmic entity Relic, who seeks to rid the universe of its "lightsmiths", considering it the only way to keep the universe safe. The rest of the Blue Lantern Corps are destroyed, with Walker being taken to safety by Kyle Rayner, Carol Ferris and the Templar Guardians. Although Walker recovers, his ring abandons him after he learns that the emotional spectrum is being depleted. Walker regains his hope and his ring after witnessing Kyle Rayner's White Lantern abilities on New Genesis, confident that the emotional reservoir can be refilled.

=== DC Rebirth ===
In the DC Rebirth title Hal Jordan and the Green Lantern Corps, Saint Walker appears on an unknown planet, and is engaged in battle with hostile aliens when Hal Jordan and Kyle Rayner arrive. After they destroy the hostile aliens, Hal and Kyle ask Walker to join them in meeting with Ganthet and Sayd. Walker arrives at the new base of the Green Lantern Corps on Mogo, and is reunited with the sentient planet. Later, Ganthet and Sayd test Walker, attempting to form a psionic link with Kyle's White Lantern power, as they believe that this could bring about the resurrection of the Blue Lantern Corps. They are prevented from doing so, though Walker experiences visions of an unknown presence.

== Powers and abilities ==
Saint Walker possesses a blue power ring which is fueled by hope. He can create energy constructs, heal others, amplify the power of Green Lanterns, and weaken Red and Yellow Lanterns. However, Walker must be in proximity to Green Lanterns to use his powers fully, as hope is useless without willpower to act on it.

== In other media ==
=== Television ===
Saint Walker as he appears in Green Lantern: The Animated Series.

Saint Walker appears in Green Lantern: The Animated Series, voiced by Phil Morris. This version is initially a hermit living on Mogo before becoming a Blue Lantern during the episode "Invasion".

=== Video games ===
- Saint Walker appears in DC Universe Online.
- Saint Walker appears as a playable character in Lego Batman 3: Beyond Gotham, voiced by Sam Riegel.

=== Miscellaneous ===
Saint Walker appears in Smallville Season 11.
