= Green Lantern Corps =

Law enforcement agency appearing in DC Comics

- Seal of the Green Lantern Corps

Publication information
- Publisher: DC Comics
- First appearance: Showcase #22 (September 1959)
- Created by: John Broome; Gil Kane

In-story information
- Base(s): Oa; Mogo

Roster

The Green Lantern Corps is a fictional intergalactic law enforcement agency appearing in American comic books published by DC Comics. Co-created by writer John Broome and artist Gil Kane, the organization first appeared along with member Hal Jordan in Showcase #22 in 1959.

The agency patrols the farthest reaches of the DC Universe at the behest of the Guardians of the Universe, a race of immortals residing on the planet Oa. According to DC continuity, the Green Lantern Corps have been in existence for three billion years. Currently operating amongst the 3600 "sectors" of the universe, there are 7204 members (known commonly as Green Lanterns). Each Green Lantern is given a power ring, a tool granting the use of incredible abilities that are directed by the wearer's own willpower.

== Publication history ==
In 1959, during a revival of the popularity of superhero comics in America, DC Comics' editor Julius Schwartz decided to reinvent the 1940s superhero character Green Lantern as a science fiction hero. Schwartz's new conception of Green Lantern had a different name (Hal Jordan), costume, and origin story, and no connection to the original Green Lantern. Whereas the Green Lantern of the 1940s was a lone vigilante who only had adventures on Earth, the new Green Lantern was but one of a group of interstellar lawmen who all called themselves Green Lanterns. The group is first mentioned in Showcase #22 (1959) when a dying Green Lantern passes on his ring to Hal Jordan. Over the years, writers have introduced a large cast of Green Lanterns in both supporting and starring roles.

== Power ring ==
A set of Green Lantern Corps' rings. Their shape and look varies across each of its members

The first appearance of a power ring was in All-American Comics #16 on July 14, 1940, the flagship title of comic book publisher All-American Publications, which featured the first appearance of Alan Scott. Creator Martin Nodell cited Richard Wagner's opera cycle The Ring of the Nibelung and the sight of a trainman's green railway lantern as inspirations for the combination of a magical ring and lantern. Scott's ring is powered by the Green Flame, a magically empowered flame contained within a metallic alien orb that was found and forged into a lantern and ring by a lampmaker named Chang. Later writers revised this to be a fragment of the Starheart, a mystical object created by the Guardians of the Universe to contain magic.

When the Green Lantern character was reinvented, beginning with the introduction of Hal Jordan, the magic ring concept was replaced with a scientifically based one. The new version of the ring is created by the Guardians of the Universe, who also created the Green Lantern Corps.

=== Powers and abilities ===
A weapon of considerable power, the power rings are considered one of the most powerful weapons within the DC Universe, most notably able to generate green energy that can be molded into whatever shape and form the user desires. These "constructs" typically appear as physical objects, as well as protective force fields that enables the user to fly and survive in space.

While powerful, power rings have limitations; Green Lantern rings possess a limited amount of charge and must be periodically recharged. Various devices and abilities can drain the ring of its power against the will of its wearer, or absorb its energy for later use. Furthermore, they were originally unable to affect objects colored yellow, with varying explanations from writers. In early stories, it was because of a necessary design flaw. Gerard Jones revised this, in a story that revealed that the Guardians could change the weakness at will. In Green Lantern: Rebirth, the "yellow impurity" is the result of the fear entity Parallax being imprisoned in the Central Power Battery. The most significant limitation makes only people with exceptional willpower able to use them, making it difficult for average individuals. Power rings originally possessed programming to prevent the wearer from killing sentient beings. This restriction was rescinded by the Guardians to combat the Sinestro Corps, then for the general execution of their duties.

=== Oaths ===
All power rings need periodic recharging. When doing so, many Green Lanterns recite an oath while the ring charges. The oath is not required to charge the ring, but is recited to reaffirm commitment to the Green Lantern Corps. While many Green Lanterns create their own oath, the majority use the Corps' official oath as a sign of respect. As additional Corps were introduced into DC continuity, with their own rings, corresponding oaths unique to each Corps were introduced as well.

== Other Lantern Corps ==
While Green Lantern villain Sinestro had his own version of the power ring since 1961, a yellow one that exploited the one color Green Lanterns were ineffective against, in the late 2000s writer Geoff Johns and artist Ethan Van Sciver worked the concept of a spectrum of rings, revolving around the colors of the rainbow as well as a corresponding emotion from which they derive their abilities. The storylines "Sinestro Corps War" and "Blackest Night" introduce the rest of the spectrum, along with its emotions, corps and rings: red (rage), orange (greed), yellow (fear), green (willpower), blue (hope), indigo (compassion), violet (love), black (death), and white (life).

=== Red / Rage ===
Atrocitus, a member of the Empire of Tears on the planet Ysmault, forged the first Red Power Battery from the innards of Qull, the being who tells Abin Sur the prophecy of the Blackest Night. Red power rings are powered by rage and charged by the blood of those the user kills.

Red rings replace the user's heart and transform their blood into corrosive plasma. They normally cannot be removed without killing the user.

=== Orange / Avarice ===
An orange ring is powered by avarice (greed) and unlike the other Corps, only one living individual can wield the power of the orange light.

The orange ring allows Larfleeze the same abilities as other Corps: flight, aura projection and orange light constructs. As a side effect of wielding the orange light, Larfleeze is burdened with insatiable hunger. The orange light allows Larfleeze to absorb the energy of other power rings and steal the identities of those he kills, transforming them into an Orange Lantern construct. By being in constant contact with his main power battery, Larfleeze has become one with his power source. This allows him to maintain a power level high enough to support an entire Corps of orange constructs even when separated from it.

=== Yellow / Fear ===
The first yellow ring is acquired by Sinestro following his banishment to the antimatter universe of Qward. The ring is later obtained by Guy Gardner, who uses it until it is destroyed by Parallax. The Weaponers of Qward later forge two more rings to be used against Kyle Rayner, wielded by Fatality and Alexander Nero.

Following his return in the Green Lantern: Rebirth storyline, Sinestro obtains a new yellow ring and founds the Sinestro Corps. Yellow rings are fueled by fear instead of willpower, but function the same as their green counterparts. Members of the Sinestro Corps are chosen for their ability to instill fear in others.

According to Ethan Van Sciver, the ring's symbol is based on ancient carvings made by beings who looked into the gullet of Parallax and survived.

=== Blue / Hope ===
As the Sinestro Corps War ends, former Guardian of the Universe Ganthet creates the first blue power ring. Blue rings are fueled by hope and must be near an active Green ring to tap into their full potential. Otherwise, the blue rings are only capable of the abilities of ordinary Green Lantern rings. This is because hope requires willpower to enact it.

While within the proximity of a Green Lantern's ring, a blue ring can heal wounds, neutralize the corrupting effects of a red ring, block the energy-stealing properties of orange rings, drain power from yellow rings, and charge a green ring to twice its maximum power level. Blue rings can also grant precognitive visions to their wielders.

=== Indigo / Compassion ===
The Indigo Tribe, wielders of the indigo light of compassion, make their first extended appearance in Blackest Night: Tales of the Corps #1 (July 2009). Unlike other Corps, the Indigo Tribe carry carved, lantern-like staves. In Blackest Night #5, it is established that Indigo Tribe members use their staffs instead of power batteries to charge their rings. In addition to being able to store indigo light energy, they can replicate the power of nearby Lanterns.

Like all power rings, indigo rings are capable of the default Corps abilities of flight and protective aura generation. Indigo rings give their users the ability to perceive compassion and force compassion onto those who feel none. Paradoxically, indigo light has the ability to heal individuals with great empathy and to expose people to pain they have inflicted on others. Indigo Rings can teleport their users and others over intergalactic distances. This ability utilizes a great deal of power, so Indigo Tribe members use it sparingly.

=== Violet / Love ===
At the conclusion of the Mystery of the Star Sapphire story arc, the Zamarons realize that the power of the Star Sapphire gem is too great for them to control, so they forge a Violet Power Battery and power ring out of the Star Sapphire gem. This allows them to distribute its powers throughout an entire Corps of Star Sapphires.

Violet rings are fueled by the emotion of love. They allow their wearer to fly, generate a protective aura, and create violet light constructs. Violet rings have several unique abilities. They can create crystals which can be used to imprison members of other Lantern Corps, gradually transforming them into Star Sapphires. The rings can also detect when a love is in jeopardy, locate it, and then create a connection to the heart that can be used as a tether. Sapphires are also shown as being able to show others their greatest love. Star Sapphires are able to teleport to escape attackers, while their constructs release disorienting dust when destroyed. Violet rings can restore the recently deceased to life by drawing power from the heart of one that loves them.

Although Violet rings do not have a particular weakness to other colors, they are more susceptible to controlling their user by their own power. Love is one of the two emotions on the far ends of the emotional spectrum, and has a much stronger influence over its user.

=== White / Life ===
A White Lantern Power Ring

The first white lantern power ring is depicted during the Blackest Night event. The exact capabilities and limitations of white rings are unknown. White rings are also capable of resurrecting the dead. They are also shown "overriding" rings of other colors, turning them white for a period of time.

=== Black / Death ===
Black power rings are fueled by death, instead of light from the emotional spectrum. Black Hand becomes the first Black Lantern after killing his family and committing suicide. The symbol on black rings (a triangle pointing down, with five lines radiating up) is the same symbol used by Hand and his family.

Black rings are wielded by the deceased. In addition to the abilities granted to them by the rings, Black Lanterns retain any superpowers they may have had in life and are capable of regenerating their bodies. Black rings are able to read the emotions of the living as colored auras that correlate to the emotional spectrum.

=== Navy ===
In 1982's Green Lantern #150, the Weaponers of Qward created a corps powered by antimatter. Each member was equipped with a navy-colored uniform and a antimatter power ring that could kill a positive matter being with one hit.

=== Ultraviolet ===
The members are powered by hidden, repressed, and self-destructive negative emotions—most notably shame, hate, bloodlust, and regret. Instead of a physical wearable ring, the power manifests as an invisible tattoo that forcibly overrides the host's mind. Most of the members are controlled by Umbrax, a sentient black sun.

=== Gold ===
In the 2020–2021 Legion of Super-Heroes comic series, Gold Lantern (Kala Lour) wields a gold power ring powered by golden light.

=== Gray / Sorrow ===
Introduced during Absolute Power, the Sorrow Lantern is the manifestation of the misery the Emotional Spectrum experienced during Thaaros' attacks. The first Sorrow Lantern is Nathan Broome, Carol Ferris' ex-fiancée, who infused his engagement ring with sadness after Carol abandons him to save Hal Jordan, transforming him into the Sorrow Lantern. As the Sorrow Lantern, Nathan's body constantly emits a gray mist that he can solidify and generate constructs that force sorrow onto others.

== Alternate versions ==
- In Superman & Batman: Generations, it is stated that the rings' weakness is only based on what the users believe the rings are vulnerable to; Alan Scott believes that his ring was vulnerable to wood because he was caught off-guard by someone wielding a wooden block the first time he used the ring.
- In the Elseworlds storyline JLA: Another Nail, a power ring essentially merges with a Mother Box when Big Barda is chosen as a Green Lantern when the war between New Genesis and Apokolips becomes so intense that the Green Lantern Corps step in. Through its link to the Mother Box, the ring also hosts the consciousness of Mister Miracle.
- In the crossover miniseries Star Trek/Green Lantern, various members of the seven Corps are transferred into the new Star Trek timeline when Nekron's latest attack causes Ganthet to initiate the 'Last Light' protocol, transferring the last power rings and living wielders to another universe. After Hal Jordan, Carol Ferris and Saint Walker make contact with the USS Enterprise, along with Doctor Leonard McCoy, Nyota Uhura, and Pavel Chekov being chosen by reserve rings of the Indigo Tribe, Star Sapphires and Blue Lantern Corps respectively, Montgomery Scott's analysis of the rings allows him to create his own version. At the conclusion of the series, Scotty receives permission to put the rings into mass production. In the sequel Star Trek/Green Lantern: Strange Worlds, James T. Kirk obtains a prototype Green Lantern ring.
- The Universal Ring appears in Planet of the Apes/Green Lantern. One Universal ring was given Katerina Mar in secret.
- In Batman: The Dawnbreaker—part of a series of one-shots looking at darker alternate versions of Batman—when Bruce Wayne was chosen as the Green Lantern immediately after the deaths of his parents, his rage and emotional trauma were so great that he was able to overcome the ring's limitations against using lethal force by nothing more than strength of will. This dark attitude results in him drawing on an unspecified 'void' through his ring, which allows him to overwhelm even a large number of other Green Lanterns and Guardians when they come to confront him over his violation of the rules of Oa.
- In Green Lantern: Earth One, the power rings are seen merely as powerful weapons. They do not choose their users, can be used by anyone and do not require the wielder to be capable of great willpower or overcoming fear and do not appear to possess any degree of artificial intelligence or capacity for independent action. No oath is required to charge them. Following the apparent destruction of the Central Power Battery by the Manhunters, the power of the rings was limited, but their full power was unlocked following the recovery of the battery from Oa.
- In the Absolute Universe title, Absolute Green Lantern, the entire Emotional Spectrum is entirely reinvented, renamed the Spectrum of Light. Instead of being derived from different emotions like most incarnations, the Spectrum only has four colors in this universe, each representing different levels of enlightenment: Black, or Qard, being chaotic actions; Red or Rao, being acting with restraint; Green or Sur, being correct actions, and finally Gold or Aur, being total understanding. Another big change: Wielders of the different "flames" don't use rings to harness their powers, though the protagonist, Sojourner Mullein, has the green light accidentally absorbed into her wedding ring, which gives her the power. There are no Corps in this universe, only two opposing factions: the Oans, a morally-ambiguous group who consider Gold/Aur the highest level of light; and the Weaponers, or Blackstars, a more militaristic and violent group led by Sin Es Tro, who believe enlightenment is useless and that Black/Qard level is the highest and is the embodiment of pure will. While being the antagonists, the Blackstars have more in common with the mainline Green Lantern Corp than the Oans, being an organized intergalactic police force with a focus on will, with many of its ranks being Green Lanterns in the main universe, such as Kilowog and Mogo.

== Writers ==
The following writers have been involved in the ongoing Green Lantern Corps series:

Writer	Tenure	Issues written
Steve Englehart	Vol. 1 #201–223	1986–1988
Joey Cavalieri	Vol. 1 #224	1988
Dave Gibbons	Vol. 2 #1–6, #10–17	2006–2007
Keith Champagne	Vol. 2 #7–9	2007
Peter Tomasi	Vol. 2 #18–20, #23–47; Vol. 3 #1–20, #0, Annual #1	2007–2013
Sterling Gates	Vol. 2 #21–22	2008
Tony Bedard	Vol. 2 #48–62	2010–2011
Scott Kolins	Vol. 2 #63	2011
Robert Venditti	Vol. 3 #21–27, Annual #2	2013–2014
Van Jensen	Vol. 3 #21–40	2013–2015
Jeremy Adams	Vol. 4 #1–10	2025–2026
Morgan Hampton	Vol. 4 #1–ongoing	2025–present

== Bibliography ==
This listing is for the "core" series or limited series to feature the Green Lantern Corps in their various incarnations over the years:

- Tales of the Green Lantern Corps (three-issue miniseries, May–July 1981)
- Tales of the Green Lantern Corps Annual #1 (1985) (first annual issue for Green Lantern (vol. 2) series)
- The Green Lantern Corps #201–224 (June 1986 – May 1988) (formerly Green Lantern (vol. 2) series; officially re-titled as The Green Lantern Corps (by cover only from #201–205) with #206 in the comic's legal indicia)
  - Annuals #2 (Dec. 1986), #3 (Aug. 1987)
- Green Lantern Corps Quarterly #1–8 (Summer, 1992 – Spring, 1994)
- Green Lantern: The New Corps (two-issue miniseries, 1999)
- Green Lantern Corps: Recharge (five-issue miniseries, November 2005 – March 2006)
- Green Lantern Corps (vol. 2) #1 – 63 (August 2006 – August 2011)
- Green Lantern: Emerald Warriors #1 – 13 (October 2010 – October 2011)
- Green Lantern Corps (vol. 3) #1 – 40 (September 2011 – March 2015)
- Green Lantern Corps (vol. 4) #1- (February 2025 – )

== Collected editions ==
=== Green Lantern Corps vol. 1 ===
Some of the stories have been collected into trade paperbacks and hardcover:

- Tales of the Green Lantern Corps (collects Tales of the Green Lantern Corps #1–3 and back-up stories from Green Lantern (vol. 2) #148, 151–154, 161–162, 164–167), 160 pages, April 2009, ISBN 1-84856-147-4, DC Comics, March 2009, ISBN 1-4012-2155-6
- Tales of the Green Lantern Corps Vol. 2 (collects back-up stories from Green Lantern (vol. 2) #168, 169, 171–173, 177, 179–183, 185, 187–190 and Tales of the Green Lantern Corps Annual #1), 144 pages, February 2010, ISBN 978-1-4012-2702-9
- Tales of the Green Lantern Corps Vol. 3 (collects Green Lantern Corps #201–206), 144 pages, Oct. 2010, ISBN 1-4012-2934-4
- Green Lantern Corps: Beware Their Power Vol. 1 (hardcover collects Green Lantern Corps #207–215 and Green Lantern Corps Annual #2–3). DC Comics, 296 pages, February 2018 ISBN 1-40127-750-0

=== Green Lantern Corps vol. 2 ===
- Recharge (collects five-issue limited series, June 2006, ISBN 1-4012-0962-9)
- To Be a Lantern (collects Green Lantern Corps (vol. 2) #1–6, May 2007, ISBN 1-4012-1356-1)
- The Dark Side of Green (collects Green Lantern Corps (vol. 2) #7–13, April 2008, ISBN 1-4352-5617-4)
- Sinestro Corps War:
  - Volume 1 (collects Green Lantern Corps (vol. 2) #14–15, Green Lantern (vol. 4) #21–23 and Green Lantern: Sinestro Corps Special one-shot, hardcover, February 2008, ISBN 1-4012-1650-1, paperback, May 2009, ISBN 1-84576-783-7, DC Comics, ISBN 1-4012-1870-9)
  - Volume 2 (collects Green Lantern Corps (vol. 2) #16–19 and Green Lantern (vol. 4) #24–25, hardcover, July 2008, ISBN 1-4012-1800-8, paperback, July 2009, ISBN 1-84576-879-5, DC Comics, June 2009, ISBN 1-4012-2036-3)
- Ring Quest (collects Green Lantern Corps (vol. 2) #19–20, 23–26, January 2009, ISBN 1-84856-116-4, DC Comics, December 2008, ISBN 1-4012-1975-6)
- Sins of the Star Sapphire (collects Green Lantern Corps (vol. 2) #27–32, July 2009, ISBN 1-84856-318-3, DC Comics, June 2009, ISBN 1-4012-2273-0)
- Emerald Eclipse (collects Green Lantern Corps (vol. 2) #33–38, 160 pages, hardcover, November 2009, ISBN 1-4012-2788-0, paperback, November 2010, ISBN 1401225292)
- Blackest Night: Green Lantern Corps (collects Green Lantern Corps (vol. 2) #39–47, 256 pages, hardcover, July 2010, ISBN 1-4012-2788-0, paperback, July 2011, ISBN 1401228054)
- Revolt of the Alpha Lanterns (collects Green Lantern Corps (vol. 2) #21–22, 48–52, 176 pages, hardcover, May 2011, ISBN 1-4012-3139-X, paperback, June 2012, ISBN 1401231403)
- The Weaponer (collects Green Lantern Corps (vol. 2) #53–57, 128 pages, hardcover, October 2011, ISBN 1-4012-3281-7, paperback, October 2012, ISBN 1401234410)
- Green Lantern: Emerald Warriors (collects Green Lantern: Emerald Warriors #1–7, 176 pages, August 16, 2011, ISBN 1-4012-3079-2)
- War of the Green Lanterns (collects Green Lantern (vol. 4) #63–67, Green Lantern Corps (vol. 2) #58–60, and Green Lantern: Emerald Warriors #8–10, 240 pages, hardcover, November 2011, ISBN 1-4012-3234-5, paperback, September 2012, ISBN 1401234526)
- War of the Green Lanterns: Aftermath (collects Green Lantern Corps (vol. 2) #61–63, Green Lantern: Emerald Warriors #11–13, and War of the Green Lantern: Aftermath #1–2, 208 pages, hardcover, January 2012, ISBN 1-4012-3343-0)

=== Green Lantern Corps vol. 3 (New 52) ===
- Green Lantern Corps Vol. 1: Fearsome (collects Green Lantern Corps (vol. 3) #1–7, 160 pages, Hardcover, September 2012, ISBN 1-4012-3701-0 )
- Green Lantern Corps Vol. 2: Alpha War (collects Green Lantern Corps (vol. 3) #0, #8–14, 192 pages, Hardcover, July 2013, ISBN 1-4012-4012-7 )
- Green Lantern Corps Vol. 3: Willpower (collects Green Lantern Corps (vol. 3) #15–20, Green Lantern Corps Annual #1, 256 pages, Hardcover, December 10, 2013, ISBN 1-4012-4407-6 )
- Green Lantern: Rise of the Third Army (collects Green Lantern Annual #1, Green Lantern (vol. 5) #13–16, Green Lantern Corps (vol. 3) #13–16, Green Lantern: New Guardians #13–16, Red Lanterns #13–16, Green Lantern Corps Annual #1, 416 pages, Hardcover, September 10, 2013, ISBN 1-4012-4499-8)
- Green Lantern: Wrath of the First Lantern (collects Green Lantern vol.5 #17–20, Green Lantern Corps Vol.3 #17–20, Green Lantern: New Guardians #17–20, Red Lanterns #17–20, 416 pages, Hardcover, February 25, 2014, ISBN 1-4012-4409-2)
- Green Lantern Corps Vol. 4: Rebuild (collects Green Lantern Corps (vol. 3) #21–27, Green Lantern Corps Annual #2, 208 pages, Paperback, July 8, 2014, ISBN 1-4012-4745-8 )
- Green Lantern: Lights Out (collects Green Lantern #24, Green Lantern Corps #24, Green Lantern: New Guardians #23–24, Red Lanterns #24, Green Lantern Annual #2, Green Lantern #23.1: Relic, 192 pages, Hardcover, June 24, 2014, ISBN 1-4012-4816-0)
- Green Lantern Corps Vol. 5: Uprising (collects Green Lantern Corps #28–34, Green Lantern Corps Annual #2 and Green Lantern #31–33)
- Green Lantern Corps Vol. 6: Reckoning (collects Green Lantern Corps issues #35–40)

== In other media ==
=== Television ===
- The Green Lantern Corps appear in series set in the DC Animated Universe:
  - Several Green Lantern Corps members make cameo appearances in the Superman: The Animated Series episode "In Brightest Day...", which features Kyle Rayner.
  - The Green Lantern Corps appear in the Justice League episodes "In Blackest Night" and "Hearts and Minds".
  - The Green Lantern Corps appear in the Justice League Unlimited episode "The Return".
- The Green Lantern Corps appear in the Duck Dodgers episode "The Green Loontern". Besides Hal Jordan, the featured Green Lantern Corps members are Amanita, Arisia Rrab, Boodikka, Breeon, Brokk, Ch'p, Chaselon, Galius Zed, Green Lambkin, Guy Gardner, G'nort, Hannu, John Stewart, Katma Tui, Kilowog, K'ryssma, Larvox, M'Dahna, Medphyll, NautKeLoi, Penelops, Salaak, Stel, Tomar-Re, and Xax.
- The Green Lantern Corps appear through flashbacks in The Batman episode "Ring Toss".
- The Green Lantern Corps appear in Batman: The Brave and the Bold.
- The Green Lantern Corps is the primary focus of Green Lantern: The Animated Series, with Hal Jordan and Kilowog as the main cast. Also in the show are "frontier space" members of the corps.
- Within the Arrowverse, during the Crisis on Infinite Earths crossover event, footage from the Green Lantern film was used to establish the existence of the Green Lantern Corps within the universe of Earth-12.
  - The series finale of Arrow, titled "Fadeout", ends with John Diggle approaching what appears to be a Green Lantern ring that has fallen from the sky, suggesting that he will become a Green Lantern. In the eighth season of The Flash, Diggle relinquishes the Green Lantern ring to be with his family.

=== Film ===
- The Green Lantern Corps feature prominently in the Warner Brothers animated film Green Lantern: First Flight. The film follows the origins of Hal Jordan and Sinestro.
- The Green Lantern Corps is the focus of a following film, Green Lantern: Emerald Knights, which features several stories about various non-Terran Green Lanterns.
- The Green Lantern Corps appear in the Green Lantern live-action film. The leader of the Corps is Sinestro, with Abin Sur, Kilowog, and Tomar-Re being central characters. As Abin Sur’s successor, Hal Jordan is trained by Sinestro, Kilowog, and Tomar-Re, and these three lead a team to confront Parallax, who is ultimately defeated by Jordan.
- In Justice League vs. the Fatal Five, Jessica Cruz, Kilowog, and Salaak appear as representatives of the Corps. Holographic depictions of most of the Lantern Corps' human members – Hal Jordan, Guy Gardner, Kyle Rayner, John Stewart, and Cruz – also appear as part of a Justice League exhibit in the Legion of Super-Heroes Museum.
- The Green Lantern Corps appear in the films set in the DC Extended Universe:
  - Green Lantern Yalan Gur appears in a flashback in the Justice League film. He is seen fighting against Steppenwolf and his army of Parademons but is overpowered and killed by Steppenwolf. Kilowog and Tomar-Re were intended to appear in a post-credits scene, but were ultimately scrapped.
    - In the Snyder cut of the film, Yalan Gur is instead killed by Darkseid.
- The Superman: Red Son incarnation of the Green Lantern Corps appears in Superman: Red Son (2020).
- The Green Lantern Corps (Hal Jordan, John Stewart, Arisia Rrab, Arkkis Chummuck, Chaselon, Galius Zed, Green Man, Guy Gardner, Kilowog, Palaqua, and Salaak) appear in Justice League Dark: Apokolips War. Jordan is among the heroes decimated by Paradooms (hybrids of the Parademons and Doomsday), while other Lanterns and the Guardians are slaughtered by Darkseid himself on Oa.
- The Green Lantern Corps appear in Green Lantern: Beware My Power. Before the film's main events, the Green Lantern Corps are revealed to have been slaughtered by Sinestro and a Parallax-possessed Hal Jordan. After the Sinestro Corps are defeated, Jordan's successor John Stewart takes Jordan's rings and sends them to new owners to rebuild the Corps.

=== Video games ===
- The Green Lantern Corps are featured heavily in Mortal Kombat vs. DC Universe. Hal Jordan appears as a playable character and one of the game's major protagonists; the Guardians appear in the game's Oa based stage, and the rest of the Corps members are mentioned to be trying to contain the universe wide crisis taking place during Story Mode. Additionally, Sonya Blade's in-game ending depicts her becoming the Green Lantern of the Mortal Kombat universe after gaining the ring of a recently deceased Corps member.
- In Injustice: Gods Among Us, Kilowog makes a cameo appearance. The Corps also appear in Green Lantern's victory pose. At the end of the game, the main universe's Hal Jordan brings the parallel universe's version of himself, who had joined the Sinestro Corps during Year Two, and Sinestro to the remaining Guardians of the Universe at Oa for trial with a Green Lantern at the center of the court.

=== Miscellaneous ===
- The Green Lantern Corps is featured in the Batman: The Brave and the Bold and Smallville Season 11 digital comic based on the TV series.
- The Green Lantern Corps appear in Legion of Super Heroes in the 31st Century #6.
- The Green Lantern Corps appear in DC x Sonic the Hedgehog. Members include John Stewart (who is one of the main characters), Ch'p, Guy Gardner, Kilowog, and Tomar-re. Hal Jordan, Jessica Cruz, Jo Mullein, Kyle Rayner and Simon Baz are mentioned despite not appearing. The series also features Silver the Hedgehog joining the Corps.

=== Literature ===
The Green Lantern Corps are parodied as the "Avant Guard" (a play on the phrase avant-garde) in The Refrigerator Monologues.

== See also ==
- List of Green Lanterns
- L.E.G.I.O.N.
- Sinestro Corps
- Nova Corps – A similar intergalactic organization in Marvel Comics
