= Atrocitus =

DC comics supervillain

- Atrocitus as depicted in promotional cover art for Red Lanterns #0 (November 2012). Art by Miguel Sepulveda and Santiago Arcas.

Publication information
- Publisher: DC Comics
- First appearance: Green Lantern (vol. 4) #25 (January 2008)
- Created by: Geoff Johns; Ethan Van Sciver

In-story information
- Alter ego: Atros
- Species: Ryutian
- Place of origin: Ryut
- Team affiliations: Red Lantern Corps; The Five Inversions; The Empire of Tears
- Partnerships: Dex-Starr
- Abilities: Red Power Ring: Superhuman strength and durability; Red energy conduit; Rage plasma; Energy projection; Blood portals; Energy constructs; Force field generation; Flight; Mind reading; Precognition; Rage absorption; Rage infection; Rage empowerment; Black Lantern resistance; Blood replication; Rage suppression; Translation of all extraterrestrial languages

Atrocitus (Atros) is a supervillain appearing in American comic books published by DC Comics. He is the leader of the Red Lantern Corps and an enemy of the Guardians of the Universe and Sinestro, their former Green Lantern.

== Publication history ==
Atrocitus first appeared in Green Lantern (vol. 4) #25 (2008), and was created by Geoff Johns and Ethan Van Sciver.

== Fictional character biography ==
=== Green Lantern: Secret Origin ===
When the rogue Manhunters rampaged through Space Sector 666, Atros was one of only five beings in the entire sector to escape death, having been forced to witness the death of his wife and children. Renaming himself "Atrocitus", he and the other four survivors formed a terrorist cabal known as the Five Inversions, bent on destroying the Guardians of the Universe and all who served them. The Five Inversions performed a ritual which allowed them to peer into the future and discover the prophecy of the Blackest Night, which decreed the end of all life. Forming an "Empire of Tears", the Inversions attempted to destroy the Guardians, but were defeated and imprisoned on the planet Ysmault.

Some time later, Abin Sur began periodically visiting Ysmault, seeking information on the Blackest Night. He even went so far as to free Atrocitus from his imprisonment so that he could lead him to Earth, the prophesied birthplace of "the black" that would one day end the universe. Taken to Earth by starship and bound by energy restraints created by Sur's ring, Atrocitus instilled fear in his captor, allowing the yellow impurity to seep into his willpower constructs and weaken them enough to allow him to break free. Atrocitus mortally wounded Sur before escaping the starship.

==== Encounter with William Hand ====
After landing near an airbase and killing an unspecified number of Air Force troopers, Atrocitus recited what would later become the oath of the Red Lantern Corps, and performed a ritual that told him the name of the herald of the Blackest Night: William Hand. Atrocitus created a device using stolen gun parts that acted as a cosmic divining rod, and used it to lead him to Hand. Once he tracked down the human who, it was said, would play a prominent role in the coming of the Blackest Night, he attacked, and planned to take Hand's innards back to Ysmault. However, Sinestro and rookie Green Lantern Hal Jordan intercept Atrocitus, taking Hand to safety. Defeated, Atrocitus is contained by Sinestro and brought to Oa. Atrocitus is later returned to Ysmault by Sinestro, where he prophesied that Sinestro's home planet Korugar would erupt into chaos and disorder. Through this act, it was implied that Atrocitus planted the seeds of Sinestro's later fall from grace.

=== Rage of the Red Lanterns ===
In the aftermath of the Sinestro Corps War, Atrocitus forges a Red Lantern power battery utilizing the power of rage. He intends to kill Sinestro, who had long since abandoned the Green Lantern Corps to forge a Corps in his own namesake. Atrocitus also kills the other members of the Five Inversions, using their blood to create red power rings and power batteries. Atrocitus dons a power ring, becoming the first Red Lantern.

The Red Lanterns interrupt a fight between Sinestro's forces and the Green Lanterns, killing members of both sides without discrimination. Sinestro is captured and taken to Ysmault for execution, and Hal Jordan is left for dead in space. After bringing Sinestro to Ysmault, Atrocitus nails him to a cross to await his execution. Unlike the Guardians, who preferred a quick execution, Atrocitus intends to make Sinestro suffer first by taking revenge on everything he cares for.

When Hal Jordan and the Blue Lantern Corps arrive to recover Sinestro, Atrocitus reveals another prophecy to Jordan: that the Guardians will one day take his greatest love, and he will become a renegade once again because of their actions. Although Sinestro believes that Atrocitus' prophecy could be a form of reverse psychology to instill fear in Jordan of his past actions under the influence of Parallax. After rescuing Sinestro, the Blue Lanterns began to leave, but Jordan wanted to go back for Laira, whom Sinestro killed to save Jordan. In a burst of outrage, Jordan tries to kill Sinestro himself, against the wishes of the Blue Lanterns. Jordan's rage attracts Laira's red ring to him, making him a Red Lantern. Jordan attacks the Blue Lanterns and Sinestro until Saint Walker subdues him with a blue power ring.

=== Blackest Night ===
During the Blackest Night limited series, the Lost Lanterns arrive on Ysmault to retrieve Laira's body, but are opposed by Atrocitus and the Red Lanterns. During the conflict, several black power rings descend onto Ysmault, reanimating the bodies of Laira and the Five Inversions. Atrocitus agrees to help in the fight against the Black Lanterns, but promised to kill the Guardians when the conflict was over. When the Corps leaders and their deputies are being attacked by a Black Lantern Spectre, Atrocitus senses the spirit's true nature despite being influenced by the black ring; an embodiment of rage and vengeance. Atrocitus desires to harness the Spectre's powers for his vendettas against the Guardians after the spirit is free from the Black Lantern Corps. When Parallax frees the Spectre, Atrocitus attempts to convert him into his own rage entity, but fails, the Spectre warning him that the true rage entity is not to be trifled with.

=== Brightest Day ===
Following the defeat of the Black Lanterns, Atrocitus returns to Ysmault, and is soon after approached by Ganthet and Guy Gardner, who ask him to join them in an as-yet unidentified mission. Despite his utter hatred for the Guardians, Atrocitus agrees, sending the Red Lantern Bleez to assist Gardner.

Sometime later, he appeared in New York City with Dex-Starr in search of the emotional spectrum entities. They killed several criminals in the subway, while sparing the remaining riders in the subway car. When he performed his blood ritual, it revealed to him the location of the entities except for Ion and Parallax. Hal Jordan, Carol Ferris, and Sinestro confronted Atrocitus for his murderous actions as he finished the ritual; however, Atrocitus justified them by claiming they did what they did to protect innocents. Ferris confirms Atrocitus' sincerity by detecting a spark of love in his heart with her powers that was not there during their previous encounter, only to have her words ignite his anger. Enraged, Atrocitus blasts the trio out of the subway, and engages in combat. During the brawl, it is revealed that Atrocitus has learned how to create constructs with his powers. Their fight is then interrupted as Lobo makes an appearance, incapacitating Jordan. The Lanterns join together to fight off Lobo, with Atrocitus revealing that he is on Earth to stop the being who is capturing the emotional entities.

Atrocitus locates the Butcher, who is about to possess a man whose daughter had been killed by a death row inmate. Despite the Spectre's attempts to stop it, the Butcher succeeds, killing the criminal. The Butcher attempts to possess Atrocitus, revealing that Atrocitus had a wife and children who were killed in the Manhunters' attack. With the Spectre's help, Atrocitus wards off the Butcher and imprisons it in his power battery. The Spectre attempts to judge the man that the Butcher possessed, but Atrocitus argues that his method of judgment is flawed. The Spectre calls off his judgment, and is unable to judge Atrocitus, discovering that his mission is a "holy" one.

=== War of the Green Lanterns ===
Atrocitus and the rest of the New Guardians make their way to Ryut, where Larfleeze has detected Ophidian. Krona and the entities are nowhere to be found but the group does come upon the Book of the Black. Inside they discover that it was Krona who purposefully reprogrammed the Manhunters to wipe out all life in Sector 666. Atrocitus reveals that he already knew this. Lyssa Drak appears and subdues the New Guardians, trapping all but Hal Jordan in the Book of the Black.

When Jordan meets up with Guy Gardner at the "Green House", Gardner reveals the pact made between him, Ganthet, and Atrocitus. It is revealed that part of the pact was that once Krona had been defeated he would be turned over to Atrocitus to face justice. Jordan told Gardner that this most likely means executing Krona. In the final battle, Atrocitus is freed from the book by Kyle Rayner, and his red ring returns to him. Although outraged at losing the chance to kill Krona due to Jordan, Atrocitus is unable to vent his fury, as the Guardians of the Universe teleport him back home.

=== Red Lanterns ===
Following his return to Ysmault, Atrocitus feels his rage dimming, and fears that he may lose control over the Red Lantern hordes. He resolves to lead his Red Lanterns in punishing the guilty. However, feeling his control over the Red Lanterns dimming, he also decides to uplift one of them to be his equal and helper. He settles for Bleez, restoring her mind and naming her his new right-hand. It is later revealed that Atrocitus kept Krona's corpse as a 'confidant', talking to the body when he needs to give voice to his feelings about the Red Lantern Corps and his plans to upgrade their intelligence. After restoring the intellect of three additional Red Lanterns to act as a check to Bleez, Atrocitus finds that Krona's body has disappeared and fears that he may have been resurrected. Atrocitus later learns that the entity Abysmus had stolen Krona's body and used his skin to empower himself.

During a confrontation with the First Lantern, Atrocitus is shown a world where the massacre of Sector 666 never took place, but witnesses a life where he became a brutal dictator after overthrowing his world's government, even killing his wife before he is killed by his own son. Horrified at this vision, Atrocitus rejects the First Lantern's 'offer' to make that world the reality, believing that even the loss of his entire sector is better than being killed by his own son. Although he briefly orders the other Red Lanterns to kill him as he blames himself for the massacre, Atrocitus later decides to use this experience to reconnect with the rage that drives his Corps, and leads them in the final assault against the First Lantern.

In the aftermath of Wrath of The First Lantern, Atrocitus loses his ring to Guy Gardner, who has been recruited by Hal Jordan as a mole, and has his severely beaten body to be carried away by Dex-Starr. After drifting in space for a while, he manages to merge with the Butcher, the rage entity. Atrocitus creates hundreds of rings and sends them to Earth. However, Gardner takes away his ring along with Dex-Starr's and all the new formed red rings. Atrocitus survives having his ring removed and regains control of the Red Lanterns.

== Powers and abilities ==
Atrocitus wields a Red Lantern power ring that is similar to that of a Green Lantern's, but is powered by rage rather than willpower. The red ring acts as a Red Lantern's heart and can pump their rage-tainted blood out of their body through their mouth. While initially unable to do so, Atrocitus learned to create red light constructs after observing the other lanterns during the Blackest Night. It is also shown that the ring's red energy corrupts the auras of other power rings and burns them away, possibly corrupting the ring beyond the ability of a Lantern to use. Unlike the other members of the Red Lantern Corps, whose rings leave them mindless and unable to create energy constructs, Atrocitus is in full control of his mental faculties while wearing his ring and may not be affected in the same manner. However, the Red Lantern's corrupting energy can be overcome and purified by the Blue Lantern's energies. Atrocitus can deliberately override the influence of the red energy on his followers, but chooses not to.

Atrocitus possesses strength and durability capable of tossing a 14+ ton construction digger and withstanding knife attacks.

Atrocitus' association with the Empire of Tears granted him a great deal of shamanistic magic, which he used to forge the Red Lantern rings and divine the location of William Hand.

Atrocitus is highly intelligent, able to construct the energy-draining device later used by Black Hand from simple gun and computer parts. Before the Manhunters destroyed sector 666, Atrocitus was a psychologist.

== Other versions ==
An alternate universe version of Atrocitus appears in Flashpoint. This version initiated the Blackest Night by killing Black Hand and was subsequently imprisoned on Ysmault before being killed by Sinestro.

== In other media ==
=== Television ===
- Atrocitus appears in Green Lantern: The Animated Series, voiced by Jonathan Adams. This version intends to destroy entire planets to "liberate" them from the Guardians, and manipulated Razer into eventually becoming his successor by killing his wife. Later in the series, Aya makes Atrocitus her "champion of hate" in exchange for killing Carol Ferris, but is defeated by Ferris and Hal Jordan.
- Atrocitus appears in Justice League Action, voiced by Michael Dorn.
- Atrocitus makes a cameo appearance in the DC Super Hero Girls episode "#RageCat".

=== Film ===
- Atrocitus appears in a flashback in Green Lantern: Emerald Knights, voiced by Bruce Thomas. This version warned Abin Sur of his impending death as well as a prophecy in which Sinestro betrays the Green Lantern Corps, discovers the yellow element, and forms the Sinestro Corps.
- Atrocitus appears in Lego DC Comics Super Heroes: Aquaman – Rage of Atlantis, voiced again by Jonathan Adams.

=== Video games ===
- Atrocitus appears as an unlockable character in DC Universe Online as part of the "War of the Light Part 1" DLC.
- Atrocitus appears as a character summon in Scribblenauts Unmasked: A DC Comics Adventure.
- Atrocitus appears as a playable character in Lego Batman 3: Beyond Gotham, voiced by Ike Amadi.
- Atrocitus appears as a playable character in Infinite Crisis, voiced again by Ike Amadi.
- Atrocitus appears as a playable character in Injustice 2, voiced again by Ike Amadi.
- Atrocitus appears as a playable character in Lego DC Super-Villains, voiced again by Ike Amadi.
