= Krona (character) =

Fictional Character

- Krona, as depicted in JLA–Z #2 (December 2003). Art by Joe Prado.

Publication information
- Publisher: DC Comics
- First appearance: Green Lantern (vol. 2) #40 (October 1965)
- Created by: John Broome (writer); Gil Kane (artist)

In-story information
- Full name: Krona
- Species: Maltusian
- Place of origin: Maltus
- Team affiliations: Guardians of the Universe
- Partnerships: Nekron
- Notable aliases: Entropy
- Abilities: Supreme genius intellect Enhanced physical attributes Vast psionic powers Virtual immortality Infinite regeneration Wields the powers of the Emotional Spectrum; As Entropy; Body composed of anti-energy Anti-energy manipulation

Krona is a supervillain appearing in comic books published by DC Comics. Primarily appearing in association with Green Lantern, Krona is an Oan, the species who established the Green Lantern Corps. Krona was inadvertently responsible for the creation of the multiverse after attempting to view the beginnings of the universe. The machine he was using exploded while in use and shattered the universe, splitting it into many universes.

== Publication history ==
Krona first appeared in Green Lantern Vol. 2 #40 (Oct. 1965) and was created by writer John Broome and artist Gil Kane.

== Fictional character biography ==
Born on Maltus, Krona is an Oan scientist who became obsessed with observing the origins of the universe itself, despite an ancient legend stating that doing so would cause a great calamity. Krona constructs a machine that pierces the temporal barrier and views the beginnings of time itself, but it explodes, shattering the universe and creating the multiverse. As punishment, the Oans transform Krona into pure energy and sentence him to wander the cosmos. Krona's actions are what caused the Oans to become the Guardians of the Universe.

Krona regains his physical form using Alan Scott's power ring, but is returned into his energy form by the Guardians. Krona is restored to his original form once again by Nekron and attempts to kill the Guardians, only to be defeated by the Green Lantern Corps.

=== Cross-universal threat ===
While trying to discover the secret of universal creation, Krona begins destroying universes, eventually arriving in the Marvel Universe. There he confronts the Grandmaster, who, in an attempt to save his own universe, informs Krona of the existence of a being in the Marvel Universe who has witnessed the Big Bang. In exchange for Krona not destroying this universe, the Grandmaster and he will play a game; two teams, one from each universe, seek out 12 items of great power, six from each universe. Should Krona's team (the Avengers) win, Grandmaster will give the knowledge Krona seeks to him in return for not destroying his universe.

When Grandmaster's team (the Justice League) wins, Krona forces the two universes closer together, causing reality to warp wildly and making items and people switch worlds. After being told what has happened by the Grandmaster, the two teams attack Krona's stronghold. Krona nearly kills all the heroes of both teams as they penetrate his final wave of defenses. Hawkeye fires a TNT arrow at Krona's machinery, sucking him into the Cosmic Egg. The Spectre pushes the worlds apart and reality returns to normal.

=== Trinity ===
In the Trinity series, Despero, Morgaine le Fey and Enigma use the cosmic egg to create powerful monsters and reshape the world. In the aftermath of these events, Krona is freed. He recruits the Controllers in an attempt to communicate with the consciousness of the universe, but is double-crossed by them, who attempt to absorb and study his energies. In retaliation, Krona destroys them and their lab planet, only to hear the planet's consciousness "freed" from its "prison". Krona then sets out to do the same for many other planets.

Krona is later approached by Morgaine and her allies, seeking his power to fend off the returned Trinity (Superman, Batman, and Wonder Woman). Morgaine offers the planet Earth's consciousness in return, intending to replace it with the soul of Enigma's daughter.

Krona accepts and a lengthy battle ensues between him, the JLA, JSA, Teen Titans, and the Trinity. During the height of the battle Krona is imprisoned due to the united efforts of several heroes and villains, but is set free by Morgaine, finally snapped, claiming that if she cannot have the world, then nobody shall. Following that, Krona unleashes his powers and destroys Earth.

Moments after Earth's destruction, Krona encounters its essence, the Worldsoul. Krona inquires about the law of universes, wishing to know how the Worldsoul and other entities like it function and exist, hoping to learn of some higher plan or design. However, he is horrified to learn that the Worldsoul has no function other than to simply exist, resonate, and feel, to sharing in the positive emotions of everything living on its surface. This explanation defies all logic and science Krona has studied, and he believes this renders himself and his entire life pointless. In a fit of rage, he attempts to destroy the Worldsoul, but is stopped by the Trinity, who have survived the destruction of Earth. Combining their powers with that of the Worldsoul, they imprison Krona and reform Earth.

=== War of the Green Lanterns ===
After the events of "Blackest Night", a mysterious figure begins capturing the emotional entities who empower the Corps. When Hal Jordan confronts him, the entity reveals himself to be Krona. Before being banished by the Guardians, Krona was the caretaker responsible for protecting the entities, which allows him to control them. Despite the combined efforts of the New Guardians, Krona overwhelms them and escapes with the entities.

The New Guardians follow Krona to Ryut and learn that he was responsible for the Manhunters' programming glitch, which resulted in the annihilation of Sector 666. He did so to prove that there were flaws in an emotionless police force. Krona also created a gauntlet that harnessed willpower, which was the basis for the Green Lantern power ring.

Krona, along with the emotional entities, attacks Oa and has the entities possess the Guardians of the Universe. Parallax is placed inside the Central Power Battery, placing all of the Green Lanterns under Krona's control.Hal Jordan, John Stewart, Guy Gardner, and Kyle Rayner escape from Krona and fight back, removing Parallax from the power battery. Krona is killed by Jordan, with Ganthet giving his corpse to Atrocitus to do as he wishes.

=== Resurrection ===
It is later revealed that Keli Quintela's gauntlet was originally owned by Krona, who utilizes it to possess Simon Baz and activate a failsafe that allows himself to be reborn in a duplicate of Hal Jordan's body. Simon manages to regain control of his body and interrupt the process, causing Krona's new body to be damaged.

== Powers and abilities ==
Krona possesses supreme intellect, but his arrogance, impatience, short temper, and insatiable hunger for knowledge got the better of him. His madness led to his exile and his repeated defeats. He destroyed universes and risked his existence for deeper insight.

Like the rest of his species, Krona possesses enhanced physical abilities, psionic powers (including telepathy and telekinesis) and virtual immortality. His powers were later increased by Nekron, making him more powerful than any of the Guardians.

As Entropy, Krona was composed of anti-energy, could absorb others into his body, converting them into more anti-energy, and was able to create an army composed of anti-energy that were completely under his control. During the JLA/Avengers miniseries, where he wielded the power of all the universes he had previously destroyed, Krona proved able to easily defeat both the Grandmaster and Galactus, although the Grandmaster's power was sufficient to make him initially hesitant at the prospect of fighting the other being until his attempt to beat the Grandmaster in a game to gain the information he sought failed.

As the caretaker of the emotional entities which are the pure embodiments of the emotions comprising the Emotional Spectrum, Krona wields the powers of the entire emotional spectrum.

== In other media ==
=== Television ===
Krona makes a non-speaking appearance in a flashback in the Green Lantern: The Animated Series episode "Loss". This version previously created the Anti-Monitor before banishing him to another universe.

=== Film ===
- Krona appears in Green Lantern (2011), voiced by Clancy Brown. This version is a rogue Guardian of the Universe who accidentally unleashed and was consumed by Parallax.
- Krona makes a non-speaking appearance in Green Lantern: Emerald Knights. This version is an anti-matter entity who is served by Shadow Demons. He is ultimately destroyed after the Green Lanterns force him into Oa's sun.

=== Video games ===
- Krona appears as a boss in DC Universe Online.
- Krona appears as a character summon in Scribblenauts Unmasked: A DC Comics Adventure.
