= List of Green Lantern enemies =

This is a list of fictional characters from DC Comics who are or have been enemies of Green Lantern.

== Enemies of Alan Scott ==
Villain	First appearance	Description
Vandal Savage	Green Lantern #10 (December 1943)	Vandar Adg, an immortal Cro-Magnon altered by the rays of a fallen meteor, possibly in 50,000 B.C. Vandal Savage has manipulated human history behind the scenes for centuries, being a Pharaoh, helping to murder Caesar (though Pre-Crisis he was Caesar), committing murders as Jack the Ripper, and has been an enemy of Alan Scott, the Justice Society, the Justice League, the Secret Six, and many others. His main opponent was another caveman exposed to it, the Immortal Man, until his destruction.
Gambler	Green Lantern #12 (June 1944)	Steven Sharpe III, a gentleman thief, master of disguise, and expert knife-thrower, battled the Golden Age Green Lantern after feeling his life was against him and his girlfriend left him. He was a founding member of the Injustice Society. Sharpe committed suicide after losing all his money to a corrupt casino. He was succeeded as the Gambler by his grandson, Steven Sharpe V.
Solomon Grundy	All-American Comics #61 (October 1944)	Formerly Cyrus Gold, a Gotham City merchant murdered and thrown into Slaughter Swamp, where he was transformed into an undead, superstrong zombie-like creature, the wood in his body giving him resistance to Green Lanturn's ring. He stumbled into a hobo camp and remembered he was 'Born on a Monday', so was named Solomon Grundy by a hobo, and taken on a crime spree by them. He was apparently killed by a train, but later revived by an evil scientist's formula. Grundy was initially an enemy of the Golden Age Green Lantern and the Justice Society, but has both battled and aided various heroes during his multiple resurrections. He has absorbed some of Green Lantern's power due to confrontations with him. Later it is revealed that Cyrus committed suicide.
Sportsmaster	All-American Comics #85 (May 1947)	Lawrence "Crusher" Crock was a former professional athlete who turned to a life of crime using various sports-themed paraphernalia. An enemy of the Golden Age Green Lantern, Sportsmaster later retired and married fellow villain the Tigress.
Sky Pirate	Green Lantern #27 (August 1947)	The Sky Pirate is a pirate-themed villain who battled Alan Scott in the summer of 1947. Nothing is known of his origins or how he had amassed the financing for the expensive equipment he used in his early crimes. His first public crime was recorded when his airship, the Flying Dutchman, anchored alongside the penthouse apartment of a Gotham aristocrat. Casting a nearly invisible net lined with grappling hooks to the side of the building, the Sky Pirate manufactured the illusion of running across the air itself.
Harlequin	All-American Comics #89 (September 1947)	Molly Mayne, secretary of Golden Age Green Lantern Alan Scott, developed a crush on the hero and sought to gain his attention as a costumed criminal. She used hallucinatory goggles provided by the Manhunters, but she was more likely to help Alan and the Justice Society than oppose them. She helped them when they had been given amnesia by the second ISW. Eventually reforming, Molly later married Alan and the two remain together to this day.
Icicle	All-American Comics #90 (October 1947)	Dr. Joar Mahkent, a scientist who created a powerful "ice-gun" capable of freezing the moisture in the air, was a foe of the Golden Age Green Lantern. He originally made it seem a gangster had killed him by killing him and altering his body, but his scheme was foiled by Green Lantern. He was killed by Krona during the Crisis on Infinite Earths and left half his fortune to Flash. His son Cameron Mahkent, born a cryokinetic after exposure to his father's weapon, became the second Icicle.
Knodar	Green Lantern #28 (October-November 1947)	Knodar comes from the year A.D. 2447 on the parallel Earth-2. Everyone's needs and whims are met by machines so that there is no incentive to steal, therefore no reason to create crime or criminals. The one person who liked this idea of being a criminal was Knodar. He was inspired from old gangster movies. In his initial try at being a criminal he was caught and placed in a cell for all to see as a social anomaly. His uniform was custom, since no uniforms needed to be mass-produced, with P's stitched on the uniform to stand for prisoner. He escaped to 1947 and began a crime spree with stolen tech from his time period.
"Made of Wood" Killer	Detective Comics #786 (November 2003)	Samuel Sullivan was an Irish immigrant in the early 20th century, instantly embracing the United States as the land of opportunity. He witnessed the Sportsmaster defeat Green Lantern with a wooden baseball bat and lost all faith when Sportsmaster destroyed Sullivan's store. Sullivan was so devastated that he murdered the mayor (who had given Gothamites "false hopes") with the bat, carved "Made of Wood" into his chest, and placed his corpse in front of Alan Scott's statue that the mayor had erected for him. This was established as his modus operandi, the first in a long string of murders, which ended abruptly when Sullivan was committed to Arkham Asylum in December 1948. His son was an Irish mobster who was mocked by his fellow mobsters. When Seamus died, his only possession, a small chest of drawers, went to his grandson Francis Sullivan. Francis discovered his grandfather's notebook and took up the mantle of the "Made of Wood" Killer. He was defeated by Scott, along with Batman and Jim Gordon.
Red Lantern	The New Golden Age #1 (November 2022)	In the series "The New Golden Age", Green Lantern had an enemy known as Red Lantern. Vladimir Sokov was a Russian soldier for the Soviet Union's Red Army who became their answer for Green Lantern after the Russian scientists managed to harness the powers of the Crimson Flame. As Green Lantern and Red Lantern have fought on occasions during the 1940s, they have worked together when Nazis threatened both their countries.

== Silver Age enemies of the Corps ==
Villain	First appearance	Description
Doctor Parris	Showcase #22 (October 1959)	A scientist with an ambition for power. Wanting to be the first to make usable H-Power, he sends a missile at a building where H-Power is being researched. Green Lantern stops it and starts questioning plane spotters to see if any saw the missile. He finds one came from a wood and discovers a camouflaged building. When he enters Parris tries to stop him using a battering ram, but Green Lantern turns it into a stream of water that he douses Parris with and takes the scientist to Army Headquarters, where he is sent to prison.
Invisible Destroyer	Showcase #23 (December 1959)	Dr. Martin Phillips, a Coast City physicist, who found himself sketching a costumed figure without a face. Three days later, this figure came to life. Coast City newspapers dubbed the costumed criminal the Invisible Destroyer. He drew atomic energy to give him power and tried to set of an atom bomb to increase his power. Green Lantern was unable to directly stop the Destroyer as he was made of pure energy. He destroyed him using anti-energy particles, meaning that evil part of Martin's mind was now gone. A reimagined version of the Invisible Destroyer appears in the Green Lantern: The Animated Series spin-off comics, where he is portrayed as an old enemy of the Green Lantern Corps and has no implied Earthly origins.
Saboteurs	Showcase #22 (October 1959)	The first foes Green Lantern fought, who used a radiation sender to try to make a plane crash. However Green Lantern stopped it crashing and defeated the Saboteurs.
Puppeteer	Green Lantern (vol. 2) #1 (August 1960)	Jordan Weir was a scientist who created a "hypno-ray" which he could use to force his victims to obey his commands. As the Puppet Master, he embarked on a crime spree, manipulating minor criminals to do his dirty work for him. When Green Lantern interfered, Weir managed to take control of him as well, but was finally defeated. He was later, as the Puppeteer, a H.I.V.E. member and Teen Titans enemy. He has also used robot puppets.
Weaponers of Qward	Green Lantern (vol. 2) #2 (October 1960)	Echoing the positive matter universe is the anti-matter universe of Qward. Legends tell of its origins as a dimension where evil is worshipped, though the world of Qward occupies the same relative position in the anti-matter universe as the world of Oa does in the positive matter universe. The Weaponers of Qward were formed by Yokal the Atrocious as the antithesis of the Oan Guardians of the Universe; they revel in only chaos and conquest. The Weaponers despise the Guardians' Green Lantern Corps and are determined to destroy them after discovering of them from Sinestro. They had weapons that used yellow energy due to the original ring's weakness. During the Crisis some were turned by the Anti-Monitor into Shadow Demons, whose deadly touch killed trillions. They were killed when the Anti-Monitor absorbed the entire anti-matter universe.
Hector Hammond	Green Lantern (vol. 2) #5 (April 1961)	A powerful psychic criminal with a grotesque, enormous head. Hammond used a crashed meteor with unknown elements to firstly advance four kidnapped scientists minds, who he uses to create advanced technology which he claims are his own. Green Lantern stops him and restores the scientists. Hammond then advances his mind 100,000 years - giving him immense mental powers. Enemy of Hal Jordan, Hammond is obsessed with the Green Lantern and likes to live vicariously through his memories. After years of exposure to the meteor's radiation, Hammond is dependent on it for energy; without it he remains motionless due to the weight of his head, although he retains his formidable mental powers.
Sinestro	Green Lantern (vol. 2) #7 (August 1961)	The archenemy of the Green Lantern, Hal Jordan. A former Green Lantern and mentor to Hal Jordan. When it was discovered that he had enslaved his home planet through fear, the Guardians exiled him to the planet Qward in the antimatter universe. He later returned, wielding a yellow, Qwardian power ring which was powered by fear. He was seemingly killed by Hal Jordan when he snaps his neck after the Oans tried to use him to defend their planet from Jordan's attack. Returns as a leader of Sinestro Corps. Later reinstated to the GLC before being taken by the Indigo Tribe.
Zegors	Green Lantern (vol. 2) #8 (October 1961)	By the year 5700, Gila monsters, having retreated underground about the year 2000, causing humanity to think they are extinct, have developed a civilization and become much larger and stronger. They fire beams from their eyes which shrink people to sub-atomic size. Green Lantern is drawn to the year 5700 to fight the creatures. He discovers that an energy beam is giving the Zegors their eye beams and destroys the machine. He discovers that three Earthmen firing nuclear pistols at the same time can knock out a Zegor, and tells the Forces to operate in groups of three. The Zegors are defeated and the remnants are allowed to live in their half-destroyed underground city. Green Lantern is then sent back to the moment he was taken away.
Ferenc Aldebaran	Green Lantern (vol. 2) #12 (April 1962)	A magician in the year 5702. Jealous at being overlooked for the post of Solar Director, he tries to take over the Solar System by hypnotizing three Generals at one of his performances. Green Lantern is brought to the year by the Solarians to defeat him, and after defeating the Generals and mind-probing them, he realises Aldebaran is responsible and goes after him. However, the villain has created a device which paralyzes Green Lantern, who animates a statue of himself that captures Aldebaran and destroys his machinery. Green Lantern is then sent back to the second he was taken to the Future and Aldebaran is presumably jailed.
Spectrans	Green Lantern (vol. 2) #13 (June 1962)	Humanoid beings from the world Spectar, a planet in another dimension. Every four hours Spectar and Earth occupy the same space and travelling faster than light will enable travel between them. Green Lantern accidentally travels to the world and has his mind taken control of by the Spectran leaders. They succeed in making him capture the Flash, as they plan to discover the secret of his super-speed for purposes of conquest. They remove Green Lantern's memory of the event, but after talking to Pieface he realises he has forgotten the previous day. Using his ring he finds out what happened. He returns to Spectar where the Leaders have finished a formula to duplicate the speed of the Flash. Green Lantern releases the Flash and together they defeat the Spectrans and destroy the formula. It is then revealed the Spectran Drones don't want war; it was their Leaders who were the menace. After this, the two heroes return to Earth.
Sonar	Green Lantern (vol. 2) #14 (July 1962)	Bito Wladon, Master of Sound and former ruler of Modora. He wanted Modora, a very small country which hardly anyone knows about, to be recognized, so he became a villain for that reason. An enemy of Hal Jordan, Wladon's son later became the third Sonar and battled Kyle Rayner with cybernetic implants.
Star Sapphire	Green Lantern (vol. 2) #16 (October 1962)	Carol Ferris, Hal Jordan's girlfriend, unknowingly became one of his deadliest enemies. The Zamarons, a race of alien Amazon women, sought a new queen and chose Ferris due to an uncanny likeness to their last queen. With the Sapphire gem on her forehead Ferris was under the Zamarons' control. They touted female dominance, and so directed Ferris to kill the man she cherished most: Green Lantern. Ferris proved unable to do this, so for many years the gem kept her unaware of her Sapphire identity. The Zamarons later revealed they were the female counterparts to the Guardians of the Universe. Ferris later learned the Sapphire gem is a parasitic entity that has possessed women throughout the galaxy, especially those close to Green Lanterns. One example is Deborah Darnell, who was Star Sapphire in the 1970s, tormenting both Captain Comet and Green Lantern. Ferris revealed it was Jordan's brief affair with Darnell that drew the attention of the Sapphire to her, and the same fate has befallen his current love interest, Jillian Pearlman. Darnell was killed by the Spectre in the Infinite Crisis miniseries.
Doctor Polaris	Green Lantern (vol. 2) #21 (June 1962)	Dr. Neal Emerson, a scientist whose experiments granted him magnetic powers and unleashed a violent split personality (a "negative" to his normal "positive" persona). Enemy of both Hal Jordan and modern Green Lantern Kyle Rayner, Polaris was killed by the Human Bomb during the Infinite Crisis.
Tattooed Man	Green Lantern (vol. 2) #23 (September 1963)	Abel Tarrant, a former Coast City sailor with a set of tattoos created from mysterious chemicals. The Tattooed Man was able to animate these designs and unleash them upon his enemies. He was apparently killed by the Mirror Master and Jewelee during a Suicide Squad mission.
Protonic Force	Green Lantern (vol. 2) #24 (September 1963)	A bodiless sentient, the being known only as the Protonic Force existed by inhabiting forms of matter. It could survive outside of matter only for short periods of time. So it was that the Protonic Force came to inhabit a fireball inside a sentient planet (Uugo). It continued to grow inside the planet's core, where the sentient planet could not reach it, and periodically sent out powerful forces which threatened to disrupt the planet completely. The Protonic Force did not communicate with the sentient planet and was unconcerned that its power threatened the planet's existence.
Shark	Green Lantern (vol. 2) #24 (October 1963)	Has used the names T. S. Smith and Karshon; a tiger shark mutated by nuclear waste into a humanoid monstrosity. Despite his heightened intelligence, he is still motivated by his bloodthirsty instincts.
Myrwhydden	Green Lantern (vol. 2) #26 (December 1963)	Myrwhydden was an alien magician who ruled the world within Green Lantern's power ring. The mage often drew Green Lantern into the ring to terrorize him.
Black Hand	Green Lantern (vol. 2) #29 (June 1964)	William Hand, a criminal inventor whose greatest creation was a device that drained power from Green Lantern rings. After losing his hand to the Spectre, Black Hand has since gone mad and had his powers increased, allowing him to absorb human lifeforces. Finally, he became a major villain in the Blackest Night storyline after being resurrected and used the skull of a Batman clone to produce Black Lantern rings.
Headmen	Green Lantern (vol. 2) #36 (April 1965)	The Headmen were the sinister rulers of Garon. They utilized a Cerebro-ray to mentally enslave their entire planet. One woman, Onu Murtu, was unaffected by its rays and escaped to Earth. She sought out Hal Jordan, hoping that Jordan could contact Green Lantern - not knowing they were one and the same. Green Lantern helped fend off the Headmen, whereupon Onu elected to return to Garon undercover, to build a rebellion. She left Green Lantern a note for Hal Jordan, stating that while she had fallen in love with him, she had to return home. Later, Green Lantern visited Garon and helped Onu liberate her people from the Headmen once and for all.
Evil Star	Green Lantern (vol. 2) #37 (June 1965)	Twisted scientist of the planet Auron whose immortality experiments killed all life on his home world, Evil Star possesses the powerful "Starband", which draws power from the stars themselves, and a legion of minion creatures called Starlings.
Goldface	Green Lantern (vol. 2) #38 (July 1965)	Keith Kenyon, a criminal whose skin was turned to gold by an elixir of his own devising. Goldface later reformed and became an honest union commissioner in Central City.
Brutus Force	Green Lantern (vol. 2) #39 (May 1965)	Touring the Milky Way Galaxy, Bru Tusfors had fought every planetary champion and won. He always obeyed the local rules, and always fought bare-handed against any opponent with any manner of weaponry. On the world of Uxor, Bru Tusfors defeated their champion and, as always, was told of another "unbeatable" foe. On Uxor they regarded the Green Lantern of Earth as the most formidable foe.
Krona	Green Lantern (vol. 2) #40 (October 1965)	A renegade Oan scientist, Krona defied his brother Guardians by peering back to the beginning of time, an act which created the Multiverse and led indirectly to the Crisis on Infinite Earths. This caused the Guardians to try protecting the universe. He was exiled from his world, but has made several attacks on the universe after making an alliance with the demon Neron, and was the villain in JLA/Avengers, which ended with him becoming a cosmic egg that would eventually hatch a new universe. He later attacked Oa, infecting the Guardians with one of the Emotional Entities which placed them in his thrall. He was then killed by Hal Jordan using a Green Power Ring, an act that should have been impossible to do due to implanted fail-safes in the ring that the Guardians placed there to prevent the Rings from being turned against them. Krona's body was taken by Red Lantern leader Atrocitus.
Major Disaster	Green Lantern (vol. 2) #43 (March 1966)	Paul Booker, a crook with an invention that created earthquakes, shock waves, and natural disasters. He later bargained his soul to the demon Neron for probability-altering powers. However, Booker came to regret this lifestyle and reformed, becoming a member of the Justice League. He was killed by Superboy-Prime during the "Infinite Crisis".
Controllers	Adventure Comics #357 (June 1967)	An offshoot of the Guardians of the Universe with a more proactive approach, the Controllers seek to pre-emptively eliminate threats to the universe, rather than react to them. To this end, they have employed the Darkstar Corps and created pawns such as the villainous Effigy.
Lamplighter	Green Lantern (vol. 2) #60 (April 1968)	Doctor Lee Carver was a nuclear researcher seeking a way of altering the molecular structure of matter. He worked on a way to stabilize the transmutation. Tragedy struck when his experiment blew up in his face. Carver lived, but he was blinded. The combination of chemicals and the high frequency waves he was bombarding them with resulted in a new kind of light. The chemicals somehow affected his damaged optic nerves, permitting a more intense light to reach them, allowing the once-blind man to see.

== Bronze Age enemies of the Corps ==
Villain	First appearance	Description
Manhunters	1st Issue Special #5 (August 1975)	A race of robots, designed by the Guardians of the Universe, as a first attempt at an interstellar police force. Over time, they began to like hunting targets more than seeking justice. They rebelled against the Guardians and were defeated. The remaining Manhunters hid throughout the galaxy. Their mission is to destroy the Guardians and their replacements, the Green Lantern Corps.
Professor Ojo	Richard Dragon, Kung Fu Fighter #18 (May 1977)	The son of an assistant in an early atomic energy facility, whose poor safety standards exposed workers to massive doses of hard radiation, Ojo was born without eyes. Brilliant but blind, Ojo eventually created a device allowing him to see, and eventually became associated with the League of Assassins.
Nekron	Tales of the Green Lantern Corps #1 (May 1981)	The ruler of a dimension known as the Lord of the Unliving. He became the ruler, and if he was ever alive is not known. Though Nekron was not death herself, Nekron's realm contained the souls of all who had died, passing through his domain on the way to their final destination.
Yellow Peril	Green Lantern (vol. 2) #107 (August 1978)	A skyjacking gang, the Yellow Peril thought taking over Coast City Airport would be easy. Knowing Coast City's resident protector, Green Lantern had no power over the color yellow, the armed thugs dressed themselves from head-to-toe in yellow costumes.
Replikon	Green Lantern (vol. 2) #108 (September 1978)	Xum (Andre in human form) is a sentient shapeshifting alien that can mimic the appearance and abilities of others, most often the Justice League of America. Replikon lived on a planet between the orbits of Mars and Jupiter until it broke apart, destroying his entire race. He came to Earth to radically alter its atmosphere to make it suitable for his offspring.
Crumbler	Green Lantern (vol. 2) #114 (March 1979)	Alexander Percy Tuttle was bright and had a particular talent for science. His father, businessman Morris Tuttle, was only interested in making money and threatened his son if he "wasted his time" with scientific concerns. The younger Tuttle had used the father's company's fund for a vacation village project to develop a glove that operated from the energy from his central nervous system. With his mechanical glove, the Crumbler could cancel the force that binds atoms together.
Anti-Green Lantern Corps	Green Lantern (vol. 2) #150 (March 1982)	Developed as a fighting force that rivaled the Green Lantern Corps, the Weaponers of Qward tapped into the Antimatter and produced their own power rings. Unfortunately, the willpower necessary to use the rings required its bearers to have augmented brains, so that when the rings lost their charge after 24 hours, the bearers lost their lives.
Javelin	Green Lantern (vol. 2) #173 (February 1984)	The Javelin's true identity has never been revealed, but it is known that he is a former German Olympic athlete who turned to a life of crime, using his uncanny abilities with a javelin-based weapons arsenal.
Demolition Team	Green Lantern (vol. 2) #176 (May 1984)	A team of supervillains who is hired by Congressman Jason Bloch to destroy the Los Angeles branch of Ferris Aircraft. The Ferris employees were virtually defenseless against the team and their state-of-the-art weaponry provided by the Monitor.
Bolphunga the Unrelenting	Green Lantern (vol. 2) #188 (May 1985)	An alien who fought against Mogo and Guy Gardner.
Anti-Monitor	Crisis on Infinite Earths #6 (September 1985)	The force behind Crisis on Infinite Earths, the Anti-Monitor watched over the Anti-Matter Universe as the Monitor did with the Multiverse created when Krona broke the taboo of watching the universe's creation. It would try to conquer the Multiverse, but meet defeat and return due to the efforts of Alexander Luthor, Jr. during Infinite Crisis and later become the Guardian of the Sinestro Corps and fuel for the Black Central Power Battery.

== Modern Age enemies of the Corps ==
Villain	First appearance	Description
Ranx the Sentient City	Tales of the Green Lantern Corps Annual #2 (1986)	A city prophesied to destroy Mogo and introduced in current continuity in Green Lantern Corps #5 (Dec 2006).
Major Force	Captain Atom (vol. 3) #12 (February 1988)	Clifford Zmeck was transformed into a quantum-powered super-soldier in an experiment similar to that which created Captain Atom. Major Force is a brutal murderer responsible for the death of Kyle Rayner's girlfriend, Alex DeWitt.
Legion	Green Lantern: Emerald Dawn #2 (January 1990)	After Green Lantern Corps conquering planet Tchk-Tchk, they began to spread to the rest of the galaxy, at which point the Guardians of the Universe decided to take action, sending the Green Lanterns to beat back the Tchk-Tchk and seal off their planet. Tchk-Tchk quickly expended their food supply and began to die out. Realizing what was happening, they put their minds into their new invention, the Soul Jar, wherein they became a sort of hive mind. Once all the remaining minds had entered, they built themselves a new body and called themselves Legion.
Tattooed Man	Skin Graft: The Adventures of a Tattooed Man #1 (July 1993)	John Oakes, a former cellmate of Abel Tarrant who learned the art of mystical skin grafting, allowing him to open gateways and absorb people into the tattoos on his body.
Parallax	Green Lantern (vol. 3) #50 (March 1994)	A fear-inducing entity who once possessed Hal Jordan when he entered the power battery of Oa.
Ohm	Green Lantern (vol. 3) #51 (May 1994)	There is little information regarding the supervillain called Ohm. He stole an experimental suit of armor from S.T.A.R. Labs and threatened to destroy Los Angeles.
Sledge	Guy Gardner: Warrior #27 (January 1995)	An insane supersoldier created by Quorum who fought Guy Gardner.
Duality	Green Lantern vol. 3 #62 (May 1995)	Created by the last Guardian, Ganthet, Duality was a simple energy construct designed to retrieve Kyle Rayner. He is a melding of two warriors; the left half is a sword-wielding alien humanoid, the right half is a mechanized being armed with an energy blaster. Duality confronted Rayner to test the neophyte Green Lantern's skills in wielding the ring.
Purgatory	Green Lantern (vol. 3) #66 (September 1995)	Paul Christian lost his legs in a subway accident, but little did he know his troubles were just beginning. He had the misfortune of being outside the New York Public Library during a fight between Green Lantern and an attacker in high tech battle armor. After the battle, Kyle Rayner figured out a way to give Paul some of his power permanently in order to create construct legs for himself. Later on, Neron offered to augment Christian's power, giving him greater control and restoring his legs. He was hesitant at first, but he eventually agreed to Neron's deal and returned to confront Kyle as an enemy.
Grayven	Green Lantern (vol. 3) #74 (June 1996)	Illegitimate son of Darkseid, Grayven seeks to one day usurp his father's throne. He is an enemy of Green Lantern Kyle Rayner.
Fatality	Green Lantern (vol. 3) #83 (February 1997)	Yrra Cynril is the last survivor of the planet Xanshi, which Green Lantern John Stewart failed to save in a moment of arrogance. Since then, Cynril trained with the Warlords of Okaara in order to wage a vendetta against all Green Lanterns. She harbored special hatred for John Stewart and Kyle Rayner. Fatality became a member of the Star Sapphires after they turned her hatred into love for John.
Effigy	Green Lantern (vol. 3) #110 (March 1999)	Martyn Van Wyck was once an aimless drifter until he was abducted by the Controllers and turned into a super-powered being capable of manipulating fire. Rebelling against his masters, Effigy became an enemy of Green Lantern Kyle Rayner.
Traitor	Legends of the DC Universe #20 (September 1999)	Devlos Ungol was merged with an armor that could adapt to any weapon thrown at it. He then crushed his people, who died calling him Traitor. As he travelled, he fought the Green Lantern Starkaor who damaged Traitor's armor, but Starkaor was injured too, appointing Abin Sur as his successor. Traitor joined the criminal Bloody Joe Tuscano until he could replenish his powers. Eventually, Sur arrived, and alongside Marshall Henry Lee Jordan, defeated Joe and Traitor, destroying Joe's weapons and imprisoning Traitor in a pocket dimension in the ring. Almost a century later, after developing a means of exerting control over the ring, Traitor lured the Atom to use the white dwarf star fragment that gave the Atom his powers to provide himself with energy. As a result, Traitor was able to exchange Earth for the pocket world, intending to destroy each other when Earth expanded back to its normal size. As Hal Jordan and Traitor clashed, the Atom used a ring to slow the rate of Earth's growth, and thus allowing Earth to be restored safely. The destruction of his equipment sent Traitor to the Sun, which blocked him from the dead star energy that he needed to survive. Eventually, however, Traitor escaped, managing to gain enough energy to flee when the Sun briefly went out during the Final Night crisis.
Alexander Nero	Green Lantern (vol. 3) #132 (January 2001)	A disturbed mental patient with highly developed artistic skills. Nero was given a yellow power ring by the Weaponers of Qward, similar to that of Sinestro, and became a dark opposite of Green Lantern Kyle Rayner.
Amon Sur	Green Lantern (vol. 3) #162 (June 2003)	The son of Abin Sur. Driven by his jealousy of Hal Jordan, whom his father had given his Green Lantern power ring, instead of to his son, Amon became a powerful interstellar criminal, and for a time, was the leader of the Black Circle Syndicate. Became a member of the Sinestro Corps, but was soon killed by Laira.
Tattooed Man	Green Lantern (vol. 4) #9 (April 2006)	Mark Richards, a former US Marine turned hitman who tattoos the sins of his victims onto their bodies.
Ragnar	Green Lantern Corps (vol. 2) #1 (August 2006)	Ragnar, a prince of Betrassus in Space Sector 1417. He did not have his eyes on ascending his world's throne; rather, his focus was on the star-spanning Green Lantern Corps. With the wealth and power at Ragnar's command, it would come as no surprise that he had amassed quite a collection of items related to the Green Lantern Corps, but Ragnar's interest did not end with the mere accumulation of memorabilia.
Sinestro Corps	Green Lantern (vol. 4) #10 (May 2006)	After Hal Jordan's resurrection and the reorganization of the Green Lantern Corps, Sinestro organized his own corps, with himself as their leader. Members wield a yellow power ring, like Sinestro's, and must be able to invoke fear in their enemies.
Arkillo	Green Lantern (vol. 4) #10 (May 2006)	Drill sergeant of the Sinestro Corps, the monstrous Arkillo consumes the weaker recruits of his organization.
Tarra Karn	Ion #1 (June 2006)	Formerly with the Thanagarian Navy, Tarra Karn has since turned to a career in bounty hunting. At this time, her most notable quarry was Green Lantern Kyle Rayner, known as Ion.
Loragg	Green Lantern (vol. 4) #12 (July 2006)	Loragg was the aide to Amon Sur, formerly the magnate commander of the Black Circle Crime Syndicate. It is not known if Loragg had been a member of the Black Circle, as Amon Sur killed thousands of members in the Black Circle as well as their families as vengeance for expelling him.
Despotellis	Green Lantern Corps (vol. 2) #10 (May 2007)	A sentient virus and member of the Sinestro Corps, Despotellis is responsible for the death of Kyle Rayner's mother, Maura, as part of Sinestro's revenge against the Green Lantern.
Bedovian	Green Lantern Corps (vol. 2) #20 (July 2007)	The resident sharpshooter and sniper of the Sinestro Corps, a hermit crab-like creature who lies in wait for his victims within his shell.
Lyssa Drak	Green Lantern (vol. 4) #18 (May 2007)	Member of the Sinestro Corps and keeper of the Book of Parallax, that organization's most cherished text.
Karu-Sil	Green Lantern (vol. 4) #19 (May 2007)	Member of the Sinestro Corps, Karu-Sil is a feral alien who was raised by a pack of wolf-like creatures on her home world. After their deaths and her recruitment to the Corps, she used her power ring to create copies of her pack.
Kryb	Green Lantern: Sinestro Corps Special #1 (June 2007)	Member of the Sinestro Corps, a monster that murdered parents and stole their infant children for reasons as yet unknown. A cage-like sac would open on her back to hold the many infants she had stolen.
Tri-Eye	Green Lantern: Sinestro Corps Special #1 (June 2007)	Member of the Sinestro Corps, a carnivorous predator that lives at the bottom of waterwells where it springs up and captures its prey when it comes to for a drink. Its three mouths leave no trace behind as Tri-Eye tears through meat and bone. As prey would eventually learn to fear a waterwell that harbored a dangerous predator, Tri-Eye changes feeding areas by traveling across its home planet by a system of tunnels.
Atrocitus	Green Lantern (vol. 4) #29 (May 2008)	After Krona ordered the Manhunters to massacre his sector, he became obsessed with revenge. He murdered Abin Sur. He is currently the leader of the Red Lantern Corps.
Red Lantern Corps	Final Crisis: Rage of the Red Lanterns #1 (October 2008)	Shortly after the Sinestro Corps War, the Red Lanterns organize themselves on the planet Ysmault. Members of the Corps are driven by great rage. Instead of a power battery, the Red Lanterns recharge their rings with the blood of their victims. They are currently led by Atrocitus.
Orange Lantern Corps	Green Lantern #39 (April 2009)	The Orange Lantern Corps (Avarice) is made up of only one member, Larfleeze, who goes by the name of Agent Orange. All other members of the corps are in fact constructs created by him as he is too jealously possessive to share the lantern's power. All the construct-members appear as beings who have been chosen by the lantern in the past (but failed to survive Agent Orange's greed) encased in an orange glow similar to Green Lantern ring constructs.
Agent Orange (Larfleeze)	Green Lantern #39 (April 2009)	In the Vega System on the planet Okaara lives Larfleeze, a being so filled with greed that it has consumed his entire being. He now lives in a cave isolated for centuries after an ancient pact with the Guardians of the Universe let him live with the Orange Light undisturbed. The Controllers try to take his power and he kills them; thinking his deal has been revoked, he sends a message to the Guardians, warning them to leave him alone.
Keepers	Green Lantern Corps (vol. 3) #1	The Keepers are a humanoid species from Urak, a barren world where they struggled to thrive. Their existence changed when their homeworld was visited by the Guardians of the Universe who were seeking a place that would serve as a storage ground for the Green Lantern Power Batteries. This came after it became apparent that members of the Green Lantern Corps began to suffer when their Power Rings ran out of charge. Thus, the Oans sought out a means of addressing this issue by providing easy access between a Green Lantern and their Power Rings. The Keeper were told to protect the batteries, developing a form of symbiosis as the Power Batteries provided energy that nourished Urak and fed its people. The Oans eventually arrived on Urak and removed all the Power Batteries from the Keepers, who they referred to as undeserving parasites. This act led to Urak returning to its formerly barren existence with the Keepers struggling to survive, so they begin to attack another planets in order to steal their resources.
Relic	Green Lantern (vol. 5) #21	Long before the Guardians of Oa or the universe itself, the Lightsmiths discovered how to harness the energy of the universe. In their time, the violet light was passion, the red fury, the orange gluttony, the green resolve, the indigo empathy, the blue light faith and the yellow light terror. Each of the Lightsmiths created entire worlds of just pure light. Occasionally, they would war with each other, but for the most part they lived in harmony. One of them however was cautious in using the light arguing it could be exhausted. Laughing at this notion the others dubbed him "Relic", the scientist then tried to prove his claim by discovering the light's source but failed. He returns to his world after a long absence to find the light dying. Terrified of losing her, the Lightsmiths go to war, one that rages until the last of the light, the green light of resolve, dies. When all the light is gone, the universe collapses and Relic is broken apart at a molecular level. When Relic is reborn, he returns in a new form, one locked in a space anomaly. Brought back as a giant being into the new universe when he senses more Lightsmiths and escapes to stop them, knowing they only respond to violence he will use that to save the universe.

== Villains from comics in other media ==
Villain	Media	Actor/Actress
Atrocitus	Green Lantern: Emerald Knights; Green Lantern: The Animated Series	Bruce Thomas; Jonathan Adams
Doctor Polaris	Justice League Unlimited; Batman: The Brave and the Bold	Michael Rosenbaum (uncredited); Lex Lang
Evil Star	The Superman/Aquaman Hour of Adventure; Justice League Unlimited; Batman: The Brave and the Bold	Paul Frees; George Newbern (uncredited); J. K. Simmons
Goldface	Justice League Unlimited	Lex Lang (uncredited)
Hector Hammond	Green Lantern (film)	Peter Sarsgaard
Javelin	Justice League Unlimited; Batman: The Brave and the Bold; The Suicide Squad	None (did not speak); None (did not speak); Flula Borg
Major Disaster	Justice League Unlimited	None (did not speak)
Major Force	Superman/Batman: Public Enemies; Batman: The Brave and the Bold	Ricardo Chavira; Fred Tatasciore
Manhunters	Justice League; Green Lantern: The Animated Series	James Remar; Josh Keaton
Parallax	Green Lantern (film); Green Lantern: Beware My Power	Clancy Brown; None (did not speak)
Puppeteer	Justice League Unlimited	None (did not speak)
Shark	Justice League Unlimited; Batman: The Brave and the Bold	None (did not speak); None (did not speak)
Sinestro	Super Friends; Legends of the Superheroes; Superman: The Animated Series; Justice League; Static Shock; Justice League Unlimited; The Batman; Batman: The Brave and the Bold; Green Lantern: First Flight; Green Lantern: Emerald Knights; Duck Dodgers; Green Lantern: The Animated Series; Green Lantern (film); Green Lantern: Beware My Power; Lanterns	Vic Perrin/Don Messick; Charlie Callas; Ted Levine; Ted Levine; Ted Levine; Ted Levine; Miguel Ferrer; Xander Berkeley; Victor Garber; Jason Isaacs; John de Lancie; Ron Perlman; Mark Strong; Rick D. Wasserman; Ulrich Thomsen
Solomon Grundy	Challenge of the Super Friends; Legends of the Superheroes; Justice League; Justice League Unlimited; The Batman; Batman: The Brave and the Bold	Jimmy Weldon; Mickey Morton; Mark Hamill; Bruce Timm; Kevin Grevioux; Diedrich Bader
Sonar	Justice League Unlimited	Corey Burton (uncredited)
Sportsmaster	Justice League Unlimited; Batman: The Brave and the Bold; Young Justice	None (did not speak); Thomas F. Wilson; Nick Chinlund
Star Sapphire	Justice League; Justice League Unlimited; Batman: The Brave and the Bold; Green Lantern (film)	Olivia d'Abo; Vicki Lewis; Blake Lively
Tattooed Man	Justice League Unlimited; Batman: The Brave and the Bold	None (did not speak); Michael Jai White
Vandal Savage	Justice League; Smallville; Legends of Tomorrow	Phil Morris; Dean Cain; Casper Crump
Weaponers of Qward	Green Lantern: First Flight; Batman: The Brave and the Bold	Rob Paulsen; Wade Williams

== See also ==
- List of Batman family enemies
- List of Superman enemies
- List of Wonder Woman enemies
- List of Aquaman enemies
- List of Flash enemies
