= DC Comics Super Hero Collection =

DC Comics fortnightly magazine

- Cover to #1, featuring Batman
- Categories: Comics
- Frequency: Fortnightly
- Publisher: Eaglemoss Publications
- First issue: 2008
- Final issue Number: November 2012; 13 years ago 120
- Company: DC Comics
- Country: United Kingdom
- Based in: DC Comics characters
- Language: English

The DC Comics Super Hero Collection was a fortnightly magazine collection by Eaglemoss Publications and DC Comics, launched on 15 March 2008, in the United Kingdom. The series was inspired by the success of The Classic Marvel Figurine Collection, also published by Eaglemoss. Each issue featured a hand painted, lead figure of a character from DC comic books, as well as an informational magazine about the character.

The collection consisted of two regular issues a month, with a special issue released every two months, to accommodate the larger characters in the DC Universe. The series also spawned a sub-series called "The Blackest Night/Brightest Day" collection, featuring characters from the various Lantern Corps from the DC Universe.

The magazine series officially ended in November 2012, with 120 issues in the main series, nineteen specials, and sixteen issues in The Blackest Night/Brightest Day sub series.

== Regular issues ==
- Issue 1: Batman
- Issue 2: Superman
- Issue 3: Joker
- Issue 4: Green Lantern (Hal Jordan)
- Issue 5: The Flash (Wally West)
- Issue 6: Robin (Tim Drake)
- Issue 7: Green Arrow
- Issue 8: Wonder Woman
- Issue 9: Catwoman
- Issue 10: Ra's al Ghul
- Issue 11: Lex Luthor
- Issue 12: Two-Face
- Issue 13: Scarecrow
- Issue 14: Supergirl (Kara Zor-El)
- Issue 15: Shazam
- Issue 16: Riddler
- Issue 17: Starfire
- Issue 18: Martian Manhunter
- Issue 19: Nightwing
- Issue 20: Booster Gold
- Issue 21: Raven
- Issue 22: Donna Troy
- Issue 23: Spectre
- Issue 24: Creeper
- Issue 25: Deadshot
- Issue 26: Penguin
- Issue 27: Deathstroke
- Issue 28: Sinestro
- Issue 29: Black Adam
- Issue 30: Captain Cold
- Issue 31: Aquaman
- Issue 32: Superboy-Prime
- Issue 33: Hawkman
- Issue 34: Blue Beetle (Ted Kord)
- Issue 35: Bizarro
- Issue 36: Hitman
- Issue 37: Batgirl (Cassandra Cain)
- Issue 38: Guy Gardner
- Issue 39: Brother Blood
- Issue 40: Mary Marvel
- Issue 41: Green Lantern (Alan Scott)
- Issue 42: Cyborg Superman
- Issue 43: Poison Ivy
- Issue 44: Doctor Light (Arthur Light)
- Issue 45: Harley Quinn
- Issue 46: Firestorm (Ronnie Raymond)
- Issue 47: Cyborg
- Issue 48: Red Tornado
- Issue 49: Beast Boy
- Issue 50: Huntress
- Issue 51: Atom (Ray Palmer)
- Issue 52: Flash (Jay Garrick)
- Issue 53: Red Robin
- Issue 54: Black Canary
- Issue 55: John Stewart
- Issue 56: Mister Miracle (Scott Free)
- Issue 57: Zatanna
- Issue 58: Mr. Freeze
- Issue 59: Metamorpho
- Issue 60: Doctor Fate (Hector Hall)
- Issue 61: Adam Strange
- Issue 62: Red Arrow
- Issue 63: Hawkgirl
- Issue 64: Question (Vic Sage)
- Issue 65: Brainiac
- Issue 66: Black Lightning
- Issue 67: Cosmic Boy
- Issue 68: Captain Atom
- Issue 69: Detective Chimp
- Issue 70: Power Girl
- Issue 71: Lightning Lad
- Issue 72: Plastic Man
- Issue 73: Wildcat (Ted Grant)
- Issue 74: Deadman
- Issue 75: Steel
- Issue 76: Big Barda
- Issue 77: Azrael (Jean-Paul Valley)
- Issue 78: Saturn Girl
- Issue 79: Orion
- Issue 80: Mister Terrific (Michael Holt)
- Issue 81: Batwoman
- Issue 82: Doctor Mid-Nite (Charles McNider)
- Issue 83: Kyle Rayner
- Issue 84: Professor Zoom
- Issue 85: Black Manta
- Issue 86: Magog
- Issue 87: Ambush Bug
- Issue 88: Starman (Jack Knight)
- Issue 89: Hush
- Issue 90: Blue Devil
- Issue 91: Brainiac 5
- Issue 92: Blue Beetle (Jaime Reyes)
- Issue 93: Captain Boomerang (Digger Harkness)
- Issue 94: Hourman (Rick Tyler)
- Issue 95: Batgirl (Barbara Gordon)
- Issue 96: Phantom Stranger
- Issue 97: Cheetah (Barbara Minerva)
- Issue 98: Animal Man
- Issue 99: Superboy (Conner Kent)
- Issue 100: Ravager (Rose Wilson)
- Issue 101: Mon-El
- Issue 102: Static
- Issue 103: Mirror Master (Evan McCulloch)
- Issue 104: Mad Hatter
- Issue 105: Elasti-Girl with Bumblebee
- Issue 106: Stargirl
- Issue 107: Gold
- Issue 108: Mera
- Issue 109: Robotman (Cliff Steele)
- Issue 110: Grifter
- Issue 111: Aqualad (Jackson Hyde)
- Issue 112: Jason Todd
- Issue 113: Metallo
- Issue 114: Vixen
- Issue 115: John Constantine
- Issue 116: Negative Man
- Issue 117: Wonder Girl (Cassie Sandsmark)
- Issue 118: Ventriloquist (Arnold Wesker)
- Issue 119: Elongated Man
- Issue 120: Kid Flash

== Special issues ==
These are the specials that have been released.

- Special exclusive: Superman and the Daily Planet (Note: Released only in Brazil.)
- Subscriber exclusive: Batman on the roof
- Special issue 1: Darkseid
- Special issue 2: Doomsday
- Special issue 3: Bane
- Special issue 4: Killer Croc
- Special issue 5: Anti-Monitor
- Special issue 6: Gorilla Grodd
- Special issue 7: Batman and the Batcycle
- Special issue 8: Solomon Grundy
- Special issue 9: Centennial Park Superman
- Special issue 10: Etrigan the Demon
- Special issue 11: Lobo
- Special issue 12: Jonah Hex
- Special issue 13: Kilowog
- Special issue 14: Trigon
- Special issue 15: Man-Bat
- Special issue 16: Bat-Mite and Mister Mxyzptlk
- Special issue 17: Clayface
- Special issue 18: Swamp Thing
- Special issue 19: Giganta

== Blackest Night/Brightest Day ==
In January 2011, Eaglemoss started releasing a subset based on the Blackest Night and Brightest Day storylines. The size and base of the figurines is the same as the regular figurines while the DC Comics logo on the base is replaced by the various Corps logos.

- Issue 1: Black Hand
- Issue 2: Atrocitus
- Issue 3: Larfleeze
- Issue 4: Saint Walker
- Issue 5: Star Sapphire (Carol Ferris)
- Issue 6: Parallax (Hal Jordan)
- Issue 7: Indigo-1
- Issue 8: White Lantern Sinestro
- Issue 9: Ganthet
- Issue 10: Bleez
- Issue 11: Deathstorm
- Issue 12: Jade
- Issue 13: Hawk (Hank Hall)
- Issue 14: Dove (Dawn Granger)
- Issue 15: Lyssa Drak
- Issue 16: Arisia Rrab
- Special: Nekron

== Awards ==
The DC Super-Hero Figurine Collection won the "Magazine of the Year" award in the Diamond Gem Award 2009, 2010 & 2011.

== See also ==
- The Classic Marvel Figurine Collection
