= Lyssa Drak =

- Lyssa Drak as depicted in Green Lantern: Sinestro Corps Special #1 (August 2007). Art by Dave Gibbons.

Publication information
- Publisher: DC Comics
- First appearance: Green Lantern vol. 4 #18 (May 2007)
- Created by: Geoff Johns (writer); Dave Gibbons (artist)

In-story information
- Alter ego: Lyssa Drak
- Species: Talokian
- Place of origin: Talok IV
- Team affiliations: Sinestro Corps
- Abilities: Qwardian power ring

Lyssa Drak is an alien supervillainess published by DC Comics. First appearing in Green Lantern vol. 4 #18 (May 2007), she was created by Geoff Johns and Dave Gibbons.

== Fictional character biography ==
Lyssa Drak is a Talokian and member of the Sinestro Corps who is involved in the training of prospective members. Once a corpsmen has finished the physical training, they are judged by Arkillo to be ready for the next phase of training. Next, they have their yellow power ring drained of energy and enter a Fear Lodge, where they face their fears to recharge their ring. If a recruit succeeds, they are allowed to leave. If the recruit fails, they are left to die, either from thirst, starvation, suffocation, or suicide. Whatever the recruit's fate, Lyssa Drak records their success or failure in the Book of Parallax, which is chained to her body. Drak is loyal to Sinestro and highly devoted to updating and protecting the book.

When the Sinestro Corps wage war on the Green Lantern Corps, Green Lanterns John Stewart and Guy Gardner are captured and Drak is charged with overseeing their captivity. Hal Jordan, along with fellow Lanterns Graf Toren and Tomar-Tu, arrive to rescue the two. Drak is placed under Green Lantern custody.

While kept in a lantern-powered cage by the married couple Matoo and Amnee Pree, Drak terrifies them with a tale of Kryb, a Yellow Lantern who kills Green Lanterns and captures their children. Drak frightens the pregnant Amnee with the prediction that Kryb will come for their child on the day it is born. This prompts the couple to take Drak back to Oa and a Sciencell prison ahead of schedule as Matoo and Amnee decide to lead the hunt for Kryb.

Drak is later seen imprisoned on Oa along with several other members of the Sinestro Corps. Several members of the Green Lantern Corps have tried to interrogate her following her capture, but she continues to tell them stories about her fellow Sinestro Corps members rather than share her secrets. Drak is awaiting trial on Oa when Scar, the Black Guardian, releases the Red Lantern Corps member Vice to provoke a riot. During the riot, Drak escapes and regains her ring. While attempting to find the Book of Parallax, Drak is sealed inside the Book of the Black by Scar.

=== Brightest Day ===
Following Scar's death, Ganthet and Guy Gardner discover the Book of the Black, with Drak still trapped within. Drak is forced to relive the events of the Blackest Night as she reveals her greatest fear, which is of the unknown. While lamenting her fate, she is freed from the book by Krona, who is currently capturing the emotional entities. Drak is able to recognize the robed stranger, who informs her that her assistance is required since another book will soon be made and a keeper is needed. Feeling betrayed and abandoned by her fellow corpsmembers after the events of Blackest Night, Drak defects from the Sinestro Corps and becomes the keeper of the Book of the Black.

Following the War of the Green Lanterns storyline, Lyssa Drak is confronted by Sinestro and Starstorm, an energy-manipulating alien hero he fought while in the Sinestro Corps whose contact with the Book of the Black reveals the Guardians' plan to replace the Corps with the 'Third Army'. Drak returns to the Sinestro Corps and escapes from her Sciencell.

== Powers and abilities ==
As a member of the Sinestro Corps, Lyssa Drak possesses a yellow power ring which allowed its wielder to create constructs in the form of whatever objects its bearer can imagine. The power rings also provide flight, force fields and communication. In addition, she is a skilled fighter and survivalist, and quick learner.

== In other media ==
=== Film ===
- Lyssa Drak makes a non-speaking appearance in Green Lantern: Emerald Knights.
- Lyssa Drak appears in Green Lantern: Beware My Power, voiced by Mara Junot.

=== Video games ===
- Lyssa Drak appears in DC Universe Online, voiced by Bethany Rhoades.
- Lyssa Drak appears as a character summon in Scribblenauts Unmasked: A DC Comics Adventure.
