= War of the Green Lanterns =

Comic book

- Cover art for Green Lantern (vol. 4) #64, which served as Part 1 of the storyline.
- Publisher: DC Comics
- Publication date: March – August 2011
- Genre: Superhero fiction
Title(s)
Green Lantern (vol. 4) #63 (prologue) and #64-67
Green Lantern Corps (vol. 2) #58-60
Green Lantern: Emerald Warriors #7-10
- Main character(s): Hal Jordan; Guy Gardner; John Stewart; Kyle Rayner; Kilowog; Ganthet; Krona

Creative team
- Writer(s): Geoff Johns; Tony Bedard; Peter Tomasi
- Artist(s): Doug Mahnke; Tyler Kirkham; Fernando Pasarin
- Green Lantern: War of the Green Lanterns: ISBN 1-4012-3234-5

"War of the Green Lanterns" is a 2011 10-issue American comic book crossover storyline published by DC Comics that spans the Green Lantern, Green Lantern Corps, and Green Lantern: Emerald Warriors series. Issues in the crossover were written by each of the various series' writers: Geoff Johns, Tony Bedard, and Peter Tomasi respectively, and drawn by Doug Mahnke, Tyler Kirkham, and Fernando Pasarin.

The story focuses on the human Green Lanterns Hal Jordan, Guy Gardner, John Stewart, Kyle Rayner, alien Green Lantern Kilowog, and Guardian of the Universe Ganthet as they face off against their mind-controlled fellow Green Lanterns and stop the renegade Guardian Krona from taking over the universe.

== Publication history ==
The story arcs run was between March and June 2011, starting with a prologue in Green Lantern (vol. 4) #63 and Green Lantern: Emerald Warriors #7 and continuing into Green Lantern (vol. 4) #64-67 and across Green Lantern Corps (vol. 2) #58-60 and Green Lantern: Emerald Warriors #8-10. The storyline consisted of the following 10 parts, not including a prologue and an epilogue:

- Green Lantern: Emerald Warriors #7
- Prologue – Green Lantern (vol. 4) #63
- Part 1 – Green Lantern (vol. 4) #64
- Part 2 – Green Lantern Corps (vol. 2) #58
- Part 3 – Green Lantern: Emerald Warriors #8
- Part 4 – Green Lantern (vol. 4) #65
- Part 5 – Green Lantern Corps (vol. 2) #59
- Part 6 – Green Lantern: Emerald Warriors #9
- Part 7 – Green Lantern (vol. 4) #66
- Part 8 – Green Lantern Corps (vol. 2) #60
- Part 9 – Green Lantern: Emerald Warriors #10
- Part 10 – Green Lantern (vol. 4) #67
- War of the Green Lanterns: Aftermath #1-2

A two-issue miniseries following the events of "War of the Green Lanterns", titled War of the Green Lanterns: Aftermath, was published and ran in summer 2011 in place of the Green Lantern main series.

== Plot synopsis ==
While pursuing the renegade Guardian Krona, Hal Jordan, Carol Ferris, Sinestro, Atrocitus, Larfleeze, Saint Walker, and Indigo-1 come across The Book of the Black. Suddenly Lyssa Drak appears and starts pulling them into the book. Hal escapes and the book teleports away, leaving behind only the rings of its captives. On Oa, Parallax climbs into the Central Power Battery and broadcasts out to all of the Green Lanterns the message "Impurity Restored". Hal is then attacked by a group of Green Lanterns, who are trying to arrest him, he is forced to flee. Meanwhile, Krona appears with the seven emotional entities and has them possess the Guardians of the Universe.

John Stewart, Kyle Rayner, Ganthet, Hannu, Soranik Natu, and the Alpha Lantern Boodikka are on Oa when they get affected by Parallax. Ganthet overloads his power ring to remove theirs, losing his hand in the process. Freed from the yellow influence, they discover that the reason they have not been affected the same way is due to their previous encounters with Parallax. Off in the distance, a group of Green Lanterns form to look for them. Ganthet tells the others to run away. The two hide while he faces off against the Lanterns.

While flying to Oa, Guy Gardner, Kilowog and Arisia Rrab also feel Parallax's influence. They see Arisia flying and try to restrain her, but she overpowers them. A group of Lanterns then starts attacking. Kilowog helps Guy escape, telling him to head to "the Green House". Guy tries to contact other members of the Corps, but only gets through to Hal Jordan. The two eventually meet up in the Green House. Still under the effects of the impurity, they begin to argue and fight. Fortunately, their fighting causes them to drain their rings of energy. They calm themselves down and put their differences aside.

(Clockwise from the top) Kyle, John, Hal and Guy don the Blue, Indigo, Yellow and Red power rings.

They travel back to Oa and meet up with John and Kyle. The group plans to go save Ganthet but realizes that they are underpowered, until Hal reveals that he still has the rings of Carol Ferris, Sinestro, Atrocitus, Larfleeze, Saint Walker, and Indigo-1. Hal, Guy, John, and Kyle choose the Yellow, Red, Indigo and Blue rings, respectively. The corrupted Lanterns appear and clear away to make way for the corrupted Mogo, after Ganthet scolds them for using the coloured power rings.

Unable to stand against Mogo, the four Lanterns retreat. They escape into the caverns under Oa and find a facility full of weapons and devices made by the Guardians, as well as the foundry, where the Corps' batteries and rings are forged. John discovers there that Mogo is sending off hundreds of rings to space, to recruit new Green Lanterns. John and Kyle head off to stop it, while Hal and Guy go to the Central Battery. Once there, the two are subdued by the possessed Guardians.

While holding the Book of the Black, Krona explains that the Guardians have spent so long being emotionless that they are not fit to protect the universe and begins to transform Hal and Guy into Guardians, while a subdued Ganthet watches. Meanwhile, John and Kyle teleport to Mogo's core. Kyle creates a construct of Mogo's friend, Bzzd, in the hope of appealing to him. Black Lantern energy trapped in the planet's body destroys the construct. The energy comes from the Black Lanterns that Mogo absorbed in the past. With no other way to stop the planet, John absorbs the Black Lantern energy and uses it to blow up Mogo's core, killing him.

Mogo's death creates a psychic shockwave that allows Hal and Guy to escape from Krona's forces and re-group with John and Kyle, after Kyle accuses John for killing Mogo. The five attack the Central Power Battery, to no avail. Trying again, Hal and Guy decide to wield the Orange Lantern and Star Sapphire rings respectively. More Green Lanterns start attacking. Everyone fends them off as Guy combines the power of love and rage to extract Parallax. The other Lanterns are freed and attack Parallax en masse. Kyle uses his ring to free Guy of his Red Lantern ring and the four heroes join the fight as Green Lanterns. Krona then arrives with the other Guardians and the two groups face off.

During the fight, Kyle goes to The Book of the Black and draws a picture of its prisoners, freeing them in the process. Inspired by Hal's bravery and loyalty to the Corps' ideals, Sinestro decides to help, and a Green Lantern ring chooses him, much to his shock. With Sinestro's aid, Hal kills Krona, releasing the entities from the Guardians. Due to his 'rebellion' against them by working with the other ring-bearers, coupled with his recent murder of a Guardian, along with Scar, as well as high treason, they now believe Hal to be the most dangerous Green Lantern. Despite Ganthet's attempt to defend him, they discharge him from the Corps, taking his ring and sending him back to Earth.

== Collected editions ==
The series has been collected in two individual volumes:

- Johns, Geoff (2011). Green Lantern: War of the Green Lanterns. Bedard, Tony. New York: DC Comics. ISBN 978-1-4012-3234-4. OCLC 761223179.
- Bedard, Tony. (2012). War of the Green Lanterns: Aftermath. Tomasi, Peter., Kolins, Scott., Sepulveda, Miguel Angel. New York: DC Comics. ISBN 978-1-4012-3343-3. OCLC 742511244.
