= Mogo =

DC Comics superhero

Mogo the Living Planet
- Mogo, as depicted in Hal Jordan and the Green Lantern Corps #8 (January 2017)

Publication information
- Publisher: DC Comics
- First appearance: Green Lantern (vol. 2) #188 (May 1985)
- Created by: Alan Moore (writer); Dave Gibbons (artist)

In-story information
- Species: Sentient planet
- Team affiliations: Green Lantern Corps

Mogo the Living Planet is a superhero appearing in American comic books by DC Comics. Mogo is a sentient planet, and as a member of the interplanetary police force known as the Green Lantern Corps, appears as a supporting character in storylines featuring that group, specifically the Green Lantern franchise. Created by writer Alan Moore and writer Dave Gibbons, Mogo first appeared in Green Lantern (vol. 2) #188 (May 1985) in a story titled "Mogo Doesn't Socialize".

== Publication history ==
Mogo first appeared in Green Lantern (vol. 2) #188 (May 1985) in a story titled "Mogo Doesn't Socialize" and was created by writer Alan Moore and artist Dave Gibbons. Although initially a one-off character from a short story, the planet has grown in importance in the Green Lantern mythos and is a necessary part of the process for distributing power rings as well as a destination for Corps members to recuperate.

== Fictional character biography ==
=== Background ===
Mogo is a sentient and living planet. When it is desired, its affiliation with the Corps is shown with foliage arranged into a green band, marked with the standard Green Lantern Corps lantern symbol, circling Mogo's equator.

In its early appearances, Mogo is not a social Green Lantern and its interactions with the rest of the DC universe are not well documented. It avoids announcing its presence, preferring to represent itself using pseudonymous holograms. In Mogo's first appearance, it is explained that the planet-sized Mogo's gravitational field would wreak havoc on any other planet it would try to "visit", hence Mogo "doesn't socialize". At the same time, Mogo has allowed alien races to live on its surface and has been willing to change its conditions to suit them.

When Parallax, possessing Hal Jordan, destroys the power battery on Oa and kills the Guardians, Mogo loses contact with the Green Lantern energy that helped sustain him. Without energy, Mogo loses consciousness and drifts through Sector 1014 until he is discovered by a nomadic alien race, who strip Mogo of his natural resources and pollute his environment. Mogo's body reacts instinctively, creating constructs to hinder the aliens' efforts to exploit his resources. Mogo is finally rescued by Kyle Rayner, who uses his power ring to reawaken him.

With the restoration of the Green Lantern Corps, Mogo has taken on the role of a training and recreation planet for his fellow Green Lanterns. Soranik Natu, Kyle Rayner, and other Lanterns have traveled to his sector to ask for his counsel. Further, while defending Mogo from an attack by the Sinestro Corps, the Green Lantern Arisia Rrab explains that Mogo is responsible for guiding Lantern power rings without users to those who can overcome great fear, and says that "without him, the rings are directionless".

=== Prophecy ===
In Tales of the Green Lantern Corps Annual #2 (1986), a prophecy narrated to Abin Sur suggests that Mogo will be the last Green Lantern. In a battle with the "Empire of Tears", Ranx the Sentient City will explode a bomb in Mogo's core, killing him and ending the Green Lantern Corps.

The Sinestro Corps attack Mogo with Ranx, who started to drill into the planet, with the intention of planting the blink bomb. It was revealed that Mogo is the one who guides the rings of deceased Lanterns to find new replacements and that if he should die, the Corps would be unable to recruit members in this manner. Thanks to the efforts of Sodam Yat, as well as a change in the Book of Oa permitting the Lanterns to use lethal force against the Sinestro Corps, Ranx is destroyed and the Sinestro Corps are driven from Mogo.

=== Blackest Night ===
During the Blackest Night event, Oa is attacked by the Black Lantern Corps. During the attack, Salaak decrees that all rings from fallen Green Lanterns should be sent to Mogo, so as not to endanger the lives of potential rookies. Soranik Natu then sends all injured patients from the fight to Mogo, but is sidetracked by Kyle Rayner being attacked by a Black Lantern Jade. She sends her partner Iolande to Mogo with the patients alone instead. Mogo shows up at Oa to help in the battle against the Black Lanterns, pulling them into his core. There, they are continuously burned with magma, preventing them from regenerating.

Following the successful imprisonment and destruction of the Black Lanterns, Mogo and the rest of the Green Lantern Corps along with Munk and Miri face the wrath of a red ring–possessed Guy Gardner. Mogo manages to purge the red light from Guy, but warns him that some influence of the red still remains and that only a Blue Lantern's power ring can completely remove the influence of the red ring. Mogo soon resumes his duties of supervising new rookies as they are recruited.

=== War of the Green Lanterns ===
In the War of the Green Lanterns crossover, Mogo is corrupted and taken over when Krona attacks Oa with the emotional entities. Krona then uses Mogo to send out hundreds of Green Lantern rings across the universe to recruit more members to be brainwashed. Kyle Rayner and John Stewart try to stop Mogo while wielding blue and indigo rings respectively, but cannot reach him because of the Black Lantern energy that Mogo had absorbed. John uses his ring to absorb the Black Lantern energy, then destroys Mogo by firing a bullet into his core.

=== The New 52 ===
Following Mogo's destruction, the Guardians tell John Stewart that Mogo's remains appear to be moving toward a particular location, suggesting that Mogo is trying to reform. The Guardians assign Stewart to track it. While traveling, he encounters Fatality, who reveals that Mogo is actually a male and female consciousness that were 'mated' at the core, with John's fragment of Mogo containing the female consciousness that seeks to be reunited with its mate. This prompts Fatality to use her Star Sapphire powers to help the endangered love come together.

John and Fatality arrive at the location of Mogo's pieces. They are held prisoner by a space pirate using Mogo's power as the ship's energy beam weapon to attack the planet's core, threatening their lives. John and Fatality attack the space pirate, intending to free Mogo, by sending the space pirate to crash on the planet. John discovers the Guardians' plan to use Mogo. After the events of "War of the Green Lanterns", Mogo reforms into a planet's orbit. The Guardians reveal their plan was to use the size of the reconstituted Mogo and assimilate it into the Third Army, but the plan fails when Mogo destroys the Third Army trying to assimilate it.

The villainous First Lantern drains the Green Lantern Corps of their emotions on the planet Oa, but Mogo rescues the Corps by shielding them with dirt and stone, allowing them to escape. When the Green Lantern Corps are transported to Mogo, Mogo creates a scenario in which the Corps is attacked by their doppelgangers. Mogo freezes the doppelgangers and confesses the ruse to the Corps, stating that it was done to test their will and strength and prepare them to fight against the First Lantern. After the Lights Out crossover and the destruction of Oa by Relic, Mogo became the new headquarters of the Green Lantern Corps.

=== DC Universe ===
Mogo appears in DC Rebirth and the post-Rebirth DC Universe as the headquarters of the Green Lantern Corps. During the "Prism of Time" and "Fracture" story arcs of Hal Jordan and the Green Lantern Corps, Mogo also serves as the base of the Sinestro Corps under Soranik Natu's leadership.

At one point, Hank Henshaw hacked into the Green Lantern Power Battery, corrupting Mogo's landscape. Following Henshaw's defeat, Ganthet reveals the Guardians are secretly rebuilding Oa and intend to return the Green Lanterns' main base of operations there to allow for Mogo to recover.

== Powers and abilities ==
In addition to the standard powers of a Green Lantern power ring, Mogo can also alter his weather and surface conditions such as plant growth and gravity, and travel through space at faster-than-light speeds. Mogo has a form of sensory or extrasensory awareness of what is happening around and on it. However, his well-being is largely sustained by the constant supply of energy from a Green Lantern power battery. Without it, he eventually loses his strength and even falls into a seemingly comatose state. Mogo also telepathically guided the Green Lantern power rings to their bearers.

== Reception ==
Mogo and the concept of a living planet has been examined in relation to philosophy, including whether a planet can be considered a living being and possess a soul according to the philosophy of Aristotle.

== Other versions ==
- An alternate universe version of Mogo who became home to a Xenomorph colony appears in Green Lantern Versus Aliens.
- An alternate universe version of Mogo appears in Absolute Green Lantern. This version is a leading member of the Blackstars.

== In other media ==
=== Television ===
- Mogo appears in the Batman: The Brave and the Bold episode "The Eyes of Despero!".
- Mogo appears in Green Lantern: The Animated Series, voiced by Kevin Michael Richardson.
- Mogo appears in the Mad segment "Does Someone Have to GOa?", voiced by Fred Tatasciore.
- Mogo and his debut story are referenced in the DC Universe series Lanterns, with Hal Jordan's vault being activated with the voice password "Mogo doesn't socialize".

=== Film ===
- Mogo appears in Green Lantern: Emerald Knights.
- Mogo appears in promotional material for Green Lantern.

=== Video games ===
- Mogo appears in DC Universe Online.
- Mogo appears as a character summon in Scribblenauts Unmasked: A DC Comics Adventure.

=== Miscellaneous ===
Mogo appears in the Injustice: Gods Among Us prequel comic. He travels to Earth with the Green Lantern Corps to combat Superman's Regime and the Sinestro Corps until Superman pushes him into Earth's sun.
