= Arisia Rrab =

DC Comics superheroine

- Arisia Rrab as depicted on a splashpage of Hal Jordan and The Green Lantern Corps #13 (2017).

Publication information
- Publisher: DC Comics
- First appearance: Tales of the Green Lantern Corps #1 (May 1981)
- Created by: Mike W. Barr; Len Wein; Joe Staton

In-story information
- Species: Graxosian
- Place of origin: Graxos IV
- Team affiliations: Green Lantern Corps
- Notable aliases: Cindy Simpson; Predator
- Abilities: Green Lantern Power Ring Green power ring: Energy constructs; Force field generation; Energy Absorption; Energy Projection; Flight; Energy aura; Universal translator; Ring duplication; Graxonite physiology: Healing factor; Longevity; Hand to hand combat

Arisia Rrab is a superheroine appearing in American comic books published by DC Comics, usually those featuring the Green Lantern Corps, an intergalactic police force of which she is a member. Arisia is a humanoid alien with golden-yellow skin, hair and eyes, and has pointed, elven ears.

Arisia is named after the planet Arisia in the Lensman novels by E.E. Smith. Along with Eddore of Tront, she was created by writer Mike W. Barr as a tip of the hat to the groundbreaking series in his Tales of the Green Lantern Corps miniseries in 1981. Her last name is "Barr" spelled backward (note that her last name was added later, not by creator Barr).

== Publication history ==
Arisia Rrab first appeared in Tales of the Green Lantern Corps #1 and was created by Mike W. Barr, Len Wein, and Joe Staton. She is killed in Guy Gardner: Warrior #43 (June 1996). Writer Beau Smith stated that "DC wanted her dead. It was part of their deconstruction of the Green Lanterns at that time. My intent was to kill her and bring her back with powers that had no leaning to the GL Corps". Years later, Arisia is revealed to have survived due to her healing factor.

== Fictional character biography ==
=== Green Lantern Corps ===
Arisia is originally from the planet Graxos IV in Sector 2815. Her father Fentara and several other family members were Green Lanterns before her. After Fentara and his brother Blish are killed in duty, Arisia is selected to replace them on her birthday, making her at least the fifth member of the family to serve as a Green Lantern. Originally, Arisia is depicted as assuming the role of Green Lantern as a teenager.

Arisia first appears in Tales of the Green Lantern Corps #1 (May 1981) as part of a group of Green Lanterns sent to thwart Krona and Nekron. She, Katma Tui, Salaak, Ch'p, and Kilowog relocate to Earth after Crisis on Infinite Earths, where she adopts the secret identity of Cindy Simpson. Arisia is first shown as having a crush on Hal Jordan, the Green Lantern of Sector 2814, who ultimately reciprocates her feelings. After being stationed on Earth with Jordan and confronted with their age difference, she subconsciously uses her power ring to age herself so that she and Jordan can be together. Arisia is among several Green Lanterns who lose their powers due to a disruption in the Central Power Battery on the planet Oa. However, Arisia decides to remain on Earth with Hal and pursue a modeling career. Their relationship becomes strained as they adjust to the changes affecting the Corps, which eventually leads to them breaking up.

=== Powerless ===
After her break-up with Hal Jordan, Arisia begins developing her friendship with Kilowog. During one visit, an accidental blow to the head causes her to suffer from memory loss and return to her 13-year-old mentality. She seeks out the only person she believes can help her: Hal Jordan. She returns to Ferris Aircraft, desperate to find Jordan, and is reunited with him. After a short time, her memories slowly begin to return, yet she still is not ready for the responsibility of being a Green Lantern again. Though she initially offers to return to the Corps as Hal's back-up, like Guy Gardner and John Stewart, the idea is rejected.

Over time, her memories return completely, and she seeks Guy's help in finding the missing Kilowog. Arisia offers to go to Oa with Gardner and the Justice League Task Force, as her knowledge of Oa would be an asset to the group. Gardner turns her down due to her lack of powers being more hindrance than a help. After her rejection, Arisia returns armed to the teeth and demands to join them. On Oa, they discover the skeletal remains of Kilowog and are attacked by Hal Jordan. She survives the attack and, upon returning to Earth, begins working at Gardner's new bar: Warrior's. On opening day, Arisia learns of Hal's supposed death from Kyle Rayner, though it is not long before Jordan arrives himself, proving the rumor false. He changes Arisia back into her Green Lantern costume and offers to return things to the way they were. Arisia argues that things have changed and that he is not the man he once was, asking him to leave.

=== Death and return ===
A mysterious woman with ties to an enigmatic organization known only as the Quorum tries to cast a spell over Guy Gardner and gain control of his actions. In the midst of the conflict, Major Force arrives looking for Verona and kills Arisia.

After becoming a Green Lantern again, Hal Jordan travels to the Manhunters' homeworld of Biot with Guy Gardner. There, they discover dozens of missing Green Lanterns in suspended animation being used to power Cyborg Superman and the Manhunters. Hal wakes several of the Green Lanterns, but they attack him, believing he is still their enemy. He finds Arisia unconscious and cocooned in a cavern wall and frees her. Cyborg Superman reveals that Arisia's healing factor enabled her to survive following her death. Fully restored, Arisia fights by Hal's side, helping him destroy the planet. Though a relationship between the two is never restored, they do share a kiss.

Arisia is shown fighting the Sinestro Corps along with Kilowog and many members of the Corps. The Guardians of the Universe place her in a supervisory position over Sodam Yat, the Green Lantern of Daxam, as he is predicted to be an important part of the Corps' survival.

=== Sodam Yat ===
Following the Sinestro Corps War, Arisia continues to partner with Sodam Yat, now the host of Ion. They have been working to free Daxam from Mongul and the Sinestro Corps. They only succeed when Sodam sacrifices himself by entering Daxam's sun and turning it yellow. On her return to Oa, Arisia finds the planet overrun by Black Lanterns, with the reanimated corpses of her family among them.

Prior to the 2010 "War of the Green Lanterns" storyline, Krona removes Sodam from Daxam's sun to extract Ion from him. Convinced that his survival is due to divine intervention, Sodam declares that the rest of the universe must be made a better place before Daxam can be cleansed of its xenophobia. He leads his followers on a journey to "make the Guardians pay for their sins". While on this pilgrimage, Sodam is ambushed and brainwashed by the warlord Zardor. Arisia and Kilowog manage to break Zardor's control over Sodam, but Zardor flees.

Hal Jordan and John Stewart entrust Arisia with a diplomatic mission to Lantern Jruk's homeworld in an effort to stop them from an alliance with the Khund. This 'diplomacy', which is mostly honorable hand-to-hand combat by Jruk, is sabotaged by the Durlans, shapeshifting aliens who have declared war on the Lanterns.

A group of Lanterns, including Arisia, work to rescue a mysterious being they know who was tortured by the Durlans. After a long fight, they find the prisoner is Sodam Yat. Arisia volunteers to fight back when the actions of the 'New Gods' endangers all ring wielders.

== Powers and abilities ==
As a Green Lantern, Arisia is capable of projecting energy-based constructions, flight, and utilizing various other abilities through her power ring which are only limited by her imagination and willpower.

== Other versions ==
An alternate version of Arisia appears in Green Lantern: Earth One. This version is the leader of the Green Lantern Corps and a rebellion against the Manhunters.

== In other media ==
=== Television ===
- Arisia Rrab makes a cameo appearance in the Superman: The Animated Series episode "In Brightest Day...".
- Arisia Rrab makes a cameo appearance in the Justice League Unlimited episode "The Return".
- Arisia Rrab makes non-speaking appearances in Batman: The Brave and the Bold.
- Arisia Rrab makes a cameo appearance in the Duck Dodgers episode "The Green Loontern".
- Arisia Rrab was set to appear in Green Lantern: The Animated Series along with Hawkman and would've become major characters before the show was cancelled.

=== Film ===
Arisia in Green Lantern: First Flight.

- Arisia Rrab appears in Green Lantern: First Flight, voiced by Kath Soucie.
- Arisia Rrab appears in Green Lantern: Emerald Knights, voiced by Elisabeth Moss.
- Arisia Rrab makes a cameo appearance in Justice League Dark: Apokolips War.

=== Video games ===
- Arisia Rrab appears in Batman: The Brave and the Bold – The Videogame, voiced by Grey DeLisle.
- Arisia Rrab appears as a character summon in Scribblenauts Unmasked: A DC Comics Adventure.
