= Red Lantern Corps =

Fictional organization by DC Comics

- Artwork for the cover of Red Lanterns vol. 1, 1 (September, 2011 DC Comics); Art by Ed Benes

Group publication information
- Publisher: DC Comics
- First appearance: Green Lantern (vol. 4) #25 (January 2008)
- Created by: Geoff Johns (writer); Ethan Van Sciver (artist)

In-story information
- Base(s): Ysmault
- Member(s): Atrocitus; Bleez; Dex-Starr; Supergirl; Mera; Guy Gardner

Roster
- See: (see below)

Red Lanterns

Series publication information
- Schedule: Monthly
- Format: Ongoing series
- Publication date: November 2011 – May 2015
- Number of issues: 41 (#1-40 plus issue numbered #0), a Red Lanterns: Futures End one-shot, and 1 annual (as of May 2015 cover date)

Creative team
- Writer(s): Peter Milligan (#1-20, 0); Charles Soule (#21-37, Annual #1); Landry Walker (#38-40)
- Artist(s): Jorge Jimenez (#8); Tomas Giorello (#9); Miguel Sepulveda (#10-18); Will Conrad (#19-20); Alessandro Vitti (#21- )
- Penciller(s): Ed Benes and Diego Bernardo (#1-7); Andres Guinaldo (#8); Ardian Syaf (#0)
- Inker(s): Rob Hunter (#1-7); Mark Irwin (#8); Vicente Cifuentes (#0)
- Creator(s): Geoff Johns (writer); Ethan Van Sciver (artist)

Collected editions
- Volume 1: Blood and Rage: ISBN 1-4012-3491-7
- Volume 2: The Death of the Red Lanterns: ISBN 1-4012-3847-5
- Volume 3: The Second Prophecy: ISBN 1-4012-4414-9

The Red Lantern Corps is a supervillainous and sometimes anti-heroic organization appearing in DC Comics. Their power is derived from the emotional spectrum relating to anger.

== Publication history ==
The Red Lantern Corps debuted in Green Lantern (vol. 4) #25 (January 2008) and were created by Geoff Johns and Ethan Van Sciver. Some of their characteristics were inspired by 28 Days Later, one of Van Sciver's favorite films.

Johns describes the Red Lantern Corps as likely being "the most violent of the Corps [...] based on violent reaction driven by emotional eruption – rage – instead of any clear-cut plan of war." He describes Atrocitus as "the most coherent and in control of the Red Lanterns", but notes that he will have trouble controlling the other, more feral members. Sinestro is their primary target.

== Fictional group history ==
The Red Lantern Corps are first mentioned during the "Sinestro Corps War" storyline. Former Guardian Ganthet reveals the Blackest Night prophecy to Hal Jordan, Guy Gardner, John Stewart, and Kyle Rayner, which describes a War of Light among the seven Corps powered by the emotional spectrum.

Before recruiting sentient beings to the Green Lantern Corps, the Guardians of the Universe created the Manhunters, a group of robotic peacekeepers. However, the Manhunters massacred the inhabitants of space sector 666, with the survivors forming the Five Inversions, a terrorist cell bent on destroying the Guardians. Inversions member Atrocitus is consumed by rage, becomes the first Red Lantern, and kills the other members.

As the power of rage consumes and drowns the intelligence of the users, the average Red Lantern is left in an animalistic, nearly mindless state. Atrocitus is able to restore his fellow Red Lanterns to their previous mental acuity with his shamanistic magic. The ritual, initially employed on Bleez, restored her previous mindset and capacity for coherent thought without dimming her rage.

=== Rage of the Red Lanterns ===
In Final Crisis: Rage of the Red Lanterns, Atrocitus is shown in a flashback as having apparently formed a central power battery by using the blood of the other Inversions in blood magic rituals. The battery stands before a great lake of blood from which he forms his red power ring (crystallized by his anger), as well as other rings and batteries used to form the Red Lantern Corps. Harnessing the red light of rage, he sends his rings out into the universe; however, upon accepting the rings, his recruits' hearts are rendered useless. Their blood spoils from within, forcing them to expel the violently flammable and corrosive material from their mouths. Additionally, the Red Lanterns are reduced to an almost animalistic state, with only Atrocitus appearing to be in full control of himself. Once Atrocitus assembles a sufficient force, he leads them on a mission to capture Sinestro (who is being transferred to Korugar for his execution). Coincidentally, the Sinestro Corps have similar plans and they launch an ambush on the Green Lantern escort to rescue their leader. In turn, both groups are then ambushed by the Red Lanterns, who are able to take Sinestro captive by killing Green Lanterns and Sinestro Corpsmen alike. After being tried and found guilty for the murder of Amon Sur, Laira is expelled from the Green Lantern Corps. While being escorted away from Oa, her ship is attacked by a red power ring. It attaches itself to her, and provides her with a vehicle to achieve the vengeance against Sinestro that she seeks.

The introduction of the fully formed Red Lantern Corps continues in the main Green Lantern title, where Atrocitus brings Sinestro to Ysmault and intends to use his blood in another ritual. Atrocitus strikes at Laira to keep her and the other Red Lanterns from attacking him themselves. With the help of Saint Walker and Brother Warth of the Blue Lantern Corps, Hal Jordan heads for Ysmault to free Sinestro, as Ganthet believes that Sinestro will play an important role in the approaching Blackest Night conflict. Separating from his companions, Jordan finds Sinestro but is captured by the Red Lantern Corps. Just as Atrocitus orders Laira to kill him, the Sinestro Corps also arrives on Ysmault to rescue their leader. Chaos ensues, but it is temporarily relieved upon the arrival of the Blue Lanterns. The two are able to keep the battling factions from destroying one another for a time until Sinestro is released from confinement and kills Laira. Furious, Jordan's anger attracts Laira's ring and he becomes a member of the Red Lantern Corps himself. With his green power ring now inactive, Jordan attacks the Blue Lanterns and Sinestro. Saint Walker gives his ring to Jordan, which causes the red ring to explode when combined with the power of his reawakened green ring. Drained of power by Jordan's Blue Lantern abilities, the Sinestro Corps escapes. Wounded and seemingly beaten for now, Atrocitus and his own Corps also flee.

=== Blackest Night ===
During the Blackest Night storyline, the Guardians are shown observing the War of Light unfolding among the various Corps of the emotional spectrum; one of the scenes depicting the Lost Lanterns confronting the Red Lantern Corps to retrieve Laira's body from Ysmault. As the seven Corps battle one another, a new eighth group powered by death is introduced to the DC Universe: the Black Lantern Corps. Black Hand, the leader of the Black Lanterns, releases black power rings that reanimate the deceased as Black Lanterns, including Laira and the four deceased Inversions.

On Ysmault, the four Inversions attack Atrocitus and rip out his heart. However, the insatiable wrath contained within his ring prevents him from dying (having functionally replaced his heart), and temporarily destroys the Black Lantern Inversions. Later, Atrocitus is seen temporarily destroying the Black Lanterns in pursuit of Larfleeze, and demands that he surrender the Orange Central Power Battery. After a brief conflict over the Orange Central Power Battery, the two are joined by Hal Jordan, Sinestro, Carol Ferris, Indigo-1, Saint Walker, Ganthet, and Sayd. The group needs Larfleeze and Atrocitus to represent their respective colored lights in the emotional spectrum in a group effort to create a collective white light that will destroy the Black Lantern Corps. Atrocitus initially refuses to cooperate, but after deciding that the Black Lanterns are as much a creation of the Guardians as the Manhunters responsible for destroying his world, he changes his mind and complies. During the fight on Earth, Mera is temporarily inducted into the Red Lantern Corps as a 'deputy' to help hold the line against the Black Lanterns, but Wonder Woman is able to use her Star Sapphire ring to hold back Mera's rage and grant her a degree of control, with the ring being removed completely when Aquaman is resurrected. Mera's love for him compromises her rage.

During the Black Lantern siege of the Green Central Power Battery, Kyle and Guy release the Red Lantern Vice from prison so he can help them battle the Red Lanterns. Believing that Vice has escaped rather than being released, Chaselon kills him. Vice's ring later attaches to Guy, who has become full of rage following Kyle's supposed death.

=== The New 52 and solo title ===
In September 2011, The New 52 rebooted DC's continuity. In this new timeline, the Red Lantern backstory, despite having not been radically altered, was explained and expanded in the eponymous series written by Peter Milligan.

After the end of the War of the Green Lanterns, disappointed at the fact that he was not the one who killed Krona, the culprit of the Ryut massacre, Atrocitus, feeling his rage dimming, is left without a purpose. He chooses Bleez to be his equal and right hand and restores her mental faculties. Bleez becomes the Red Lanterns' representative in the New Guardians, consisting of representatives from the seven Corps working together for mutual interest.

The New Guardians investigate a mysterious Orrery in the Vega system, traveling back to Earth with Kyle Rayner to recover his power battery after he is officially discharged from the Green Lantern Corps – while retaining his ring and access to the Oan network – to protect him if the Guardians should try and capture him.

Following the defeat of Volthoom, Hal Jordan sends Guy Gardner to join the Red Lanterns as an undercover operative to keep them in check, with Gardner swiftly defeating Atrocitus and taking command of the group. It is revealed that part of his decision to join with the Red Lanterns is feeling as if he has never fit in as a Green Lantern. As a Red Lantern, Gardner manages to keep his rage in check, successfully leading most of the Red Lanterns; Atrocitus leads a splinter group and allows new Red rings to cause murderous justice-based rampages to continue. After joining with the Green Lanterns to defeat the cosmic terrorist Relic, Hal promises to give the Red Lanterns a sector for them to watch over after Gardner rejects the initial offer of being released from his new role in the Corps. However, this sector becomes Sector 2814, where Earth resides, giving guardianship of Earth to the Red Lantern Corps.

=== DC Rebirth ===
As part of DC Rebirth, it is revealed that Atrocitus and Dex-Starr are Red Lanterns once again, with the former regaining his title as their leader, and Bleez is once again allied with Atrocitus. Atrocitus wishes to bring forth the Red Dawn and obtain a mysterious new power ring that has been recently discovered. Atrocitus begins to bring forth the Red Dawn by implanting a Hell Tower within Earth and converting humans into rage conduits, waiting until the Hell Tower is ready to insert a Rage Seed. The Red Lanterns head to Earth to make sure their plans proceed on schedule and Bleez heads off to deal with Green Lanterns Simon Baz and Jessica Cruz. Simon heals Bleez, restoring her to her original form. Bleez reveals Atrocitus' plan to Simon but when Jessica intervenes and attacks Bleez, she succumbs to rage once more and returns to her Red Lantern appearance, deciding to go into hiding from the Green Lanterns and Atrocitus. Jessica inadvertently becomes a rage conduit and attacks Simon. Simon is able to purify her in a similar way he did to Bleez, and the two are confronted by Atrocitus and a group of Red Lanterns.

== Prominent members ==
=== Leadership ===
- Atrocitus (of Sector 666): The founder of the Red Lantern Corps, Atrocitus is one of the few survivors of the massacre of Sector 666 and among the few Red Lanterns who maintains his mind and the ability to create constructs.

=== Ring bearers ===
- Bleez (of Sector 33): A princess from the planet Havania who was kidnapped by the Sinestro Corps during a visit by suitors and then tortured and raped while imprisoned on Ranx the Sentient City. Her vow to exact vengeance on those who kidnapped her attracted a red power ring that saved her from being caught escaping during a Green Lantern assault on Ranx. She uses her Red Lantern powers to generate skeletal constructs that serve as replacements.
- Dex-Starr (of Sector 2814): An abandoned stray blue house cat from Earth adopted by a single woman in Brooklyn who names him Dexter. During a break-in, his owner was killed and he was evicted by police. Homeless, he was grabbed by two street thugs and thrown off the Brooklyn Bridge, but the rage he felt caught the attention of a red power ring and it came to him before he hit the water. As a member of the Red Lantern Corps, he killed the two thugs and slept on their skulls, proclaiming himself to be a "good kitty". He was described by Geoff Johns in an interview with Wizard as "the most sadistic and malicious" of the Red Lanterns. Originally intended as a joke by Shane Davis, he began being featured more prominently due to positive reception.
- Rankorr (Jack Moore) (of Sector 2814): A child punk from Earth who was taken in alongside his brother, Ray, by their grandfather after their mother died. Ever since, he always repressed his growing feelings of rage over the tragedy by attending Oxford University and reading books, until he witnessed his grandfather's murder during a robbery committed by his old classmate Baxter and Ray's brutal beating at the hands of the local police, who caught him trying to firebomb Baxter's house. Unable to repress his feelings anymore and going out to rescue Ray, Jack unknowingly allowed a red power ring that appeared before him to induct him into the Red Lantern Corps.
- Skallox: A goat-like alien and criminal who was hired to commit acts of violence by a man named Lancer. Lancer wrongly accuses Skallox of disloyalty and throws him in an oven, burning his head and causing it to resemble a skull. Skallox, enraged by what he was turned into, was then visited by a red power ring that crashed through the oven window.
- Ratchet: A jellyfish-like alien who was mutilated and deformed for defying his culture's rule of physical isolation. First depicted as a small, alien life form not resembling his current jellyfish-like appearance, he gained his current appearance after being mutilated.
- Zilius Zox (of Sector 3544): First shown in Final Crisis: Rage of the Red Lanterns, he devours a Sinestro Corps member during Sinestro's abduction. He appears to be the same species as Green Lantern Galius Zed.
- The Judge (Sheko) (of Sector 775): The former chief judge of her home planet of Primeen, whose society is deeply corrupt. She becomes a Red Lantern after her bailiff attempts to kill her. Unlike other newly created lanterns, Sheko retained her logical mindset but was still under a cold, ruthless, tranquil fury which pushed her to violently judge and murder everyone around her.
- Veon (of Sector 435): A purple one-eyed alien and one of Atrocitus's first recruits. He is later killed by Boodikka.
- Vice (of Sector 13): The most ruthless of the Red Lanterns, whose mate was murdered by Sinestro Corps member Arkillo. His forehead and jaw contain spikes which he uses to decapitate his enemies. He is killed by Chaselon during an attack by the Black Lanterns.
- Laira (of Sector 112): A former Green Lantern who is chosen by a red power ring after being punished and expelled for killing Amon Sur. Hal Jordan encounters Laira on Ysmault and attempts to calm her rage, but she is killed by Sinestro.
- Abyssma: First identified by name by Ethan Van Sciver during an interview, Hal Jordan is shown fighting Abyssma during a battle between the Corps.
- Antipathy: Antipathy is shown fighting Soranik Natu during the battle between the Corps. She is one of the few Red Lanterns to create constructs using her ring, as she is depicted wielding scissor-like constructs.
- Fury-6: First identified in Blackest Night #0, he was first seen as a participant in the abduction of Sinestro.
- Haggor: First identified in Blackest Night #0, he is similar in appearance to Abyssma.
- Nite-Lik: Nite-Lik was created for Mattel's series of Green Lantern figures and named after Mattel employee Scott Neitlich.

=== Former members ===
- Supergirl (Kara Zor-El) (of Sector 2813): The biological cousin of Superman. In the New 52, the grief and rage from her past experiences attracts a red power ring to her. Kara later removes her ring and survives due to her healing factor.
- Hal Jordan (of Sector 2814): A Green Lantern officer given a red power ring during his attempt to rescue Sinestro from the Red Lanterns and to calm Laira's rage, only to have Sinestro kill her just as he appears to be breaking through. Enraged, Laira's red power ring detects Jordan's anger and forces itself onto his finger, transforming him into a Red Lantern. Jordan overcomes the red ring's influence with the aid of the Blue Lantern Corps.
- James Kim (of Sector 2814): A man who became the avatar of the Butcher, the Red Lantern Corps' entity, after his daughter was murdered.
- Guy Gardner (of Sector 2814): Gardner is freed from the ring's influence, but temporarily regains it as part of a plot to infiltrate the Red Lanterns.
- Krona (of Sector 0): During the War of the Green Lanterns, Krona was briefly able to take control of Atrocitus' ring and the other six rings, using them against the Green Lantern Corps. The ring returns to its master after Hal Jordan kills Krona.
- Mera (of Sector 2814): The queen of the underwater kingdom of Atlantis. Mera is temporarily recruited into the Red Lanterns during Blackest Night.
- Kyle Rayner (of Sector 2814): One of the Green Lanterns of Earth, Kyle once wielded the power of all aspects of the emotional spectrum, including red.
- Superboy-Prime (of Sector 2813): Superboy-Prime temporarily becomes a Red Lantern during Blackest Night as his rage causes the black power ring that tries to turn him into a Black Lantern to temporarily turn him into a Red Lantern.

== Entity ==
The red rage entity is called the Butcher and takes the form of an Earth bull with a forehead bone structure resembling the Red Lantern symbol, created by the first act of murder. As with the other emotional entities, the Butcher is attracted to Earth by the Life Entity and is hunted by Krona. Atrocitus searches for the Butcher alongside Dex-Starr and Sinestro.

During the assault on Oa, Krona allows the Butcher and the other entities (except for Parallax) to take one of the six remaining Guardians as hosts. The Butcher is freed from Krona's control after Hal Jordan defeats and kills the rogue Guardian and is left to roam the universe once again. During the "Green Lantern: Lights Out" event, the Butcher and the emotional entities are weakened by the emotional spectrum being drained and sacrifice themselves by passing into the Source Wall to repair the spectrum.

During DC Rebirth, Atrocitus enacts a scheme to take Earth as a new homeworld for the Red Lanterns. The rage entity gestates in the center of the Earth's core, growing and feeding on humanity's wrath until it is mature enough to bring about what Atrocitus has envisioned.

The original Butcher returns in Green Lantern Corps (vol. 4), where the Green Lantern Corps free it and the other entities from the Source Wall to help combat Starbreaker.

== Oath ==
Like other Corps in the DC Universe, Atrocitus created an oath for the Red Lanterns to use when recharging their rings. As the other members of his Corps are rarely seen as being capable of speech, it is unknown how often they use it (if they are able to at all). However, it has been shown how Atrocitus is able to restore intelligence and abstract thought, along with full speech capabilities, to his fellow Red Lanterns by the use of his shamanistic magic, making them able to recite the full oath. The Red Lantern Corps oath is recited as follows:

With blood and rage of crimson red,
Ripped from a corpse so freshly dead,
Together with our hellish hate,
We'll burn you all, that is your fate!

— Green Lantern (vol. 4) #32 (June 2008), in Atrocitus

== Powers and abilities ==
Laira's Red Power Ring

Red Lantern power rings are fueled by rage and force their wielder into a feral, mindless state that can only be cured by the Blood Lake of Ysmault. Like all Lantern Corps, the red power rings give their users the ability to fly at light speed and survive in deep space. Red Lanterns possess corrosive plasma-like blood capable of destroying the constructs and protective auras of other Lanterns. The red ring replaces its user's circulatory system and cannot be removed without killing them.

== Reception ==
Critical reception for the Red Lantern Corps has been mixed. Their first appearance, during the Final Crisis event in 2008, was met with a mostly positive critical response. Jesse Schedeen, writing for IGN, remarked that "the Red Lanterns are an excellent addition to the increasingly crowded Lantern mythos." J. Montes, writing for Weekly Comic Book Review, noted that "The Red Lanterns are vicious and make the relentlessness of the Sinestro Corps almost wimpy by comparison." Likewise, Red Lantern Bleez's origin story, as told in Blackest Night: Tales of the Corps #2, received widespread praise, particularly for Eddy Barrows's artwork.

Their solo series, launched in 2011 as part of the New 52, initially received a negative response. Most reviewers praised the artwork by Ed Benes and Miguel Sepulveda, while criticizing the weak plot, inconsistent characterization, and uneven pacing.

== In other media ==
=== Television ===
- The Red Lantern Corps appear in Green Lantern: The Animated Series, consisting of Atrocitus (voiced by Jonathan Adams), Zilius Zox (voiced by Tom Kenny), Bleez (voiced by Grey DeLisle), Veon (voiced by Jason Spisak), Ragnar (voiced by Will Friedle), Skallox (voiced by Kevin Michael Richardson), and series-original character Razer (voiced by Jason Spisak). This version of the group retain their minds, can survive without their rings, and preach a fascist-protectionist ethos and cult of personality that venerates Atrocitus as a prophet figure.
- The Red Lantern Corps appear in Justice League Action, consisting of Atrocitus (voiced by Michael Dorn), Zilius Zox (voiced by Armin Shimerman), Bleez (voiced by Rachel Kimsey), Dex-Starr (voiced by Jason J. Lewis), and Skallox.
- The Red Lantern Corps appear in DC Super-Hero Girls, consisting of Atrocitus, Zilius Zox, Bleez, Skallox, and Dex-Starr (voiced by Kevin Michael Richardson).

=== Film ===
The Red Lantern Corps appear in Lego DC Comics Super Heroes: Aquaman – Rage of Atlantis, consisting of Atrocitus (voiced by Jonathan Adams) and Dex-Starr (voiced by Dee Bradley Baker).

=== Video games ===
- The Red Lantern Corps appear in DC Universe Online as part of the "War of the Light" DLC, consisting of Atrocitus (voiced by Mike Smith) and Vice.
- An unidentified Red Lantern appears in the background of the Metropolis stage of Injustice: Gods Among Us.
- The Red Lantern Corps appear in Lego Batman 3: Beyond Gotham, consisting of Atrocitus (voiced by Ike Amadi), Bleez (voiced by Erica Luttrell), and Dex-Starr (voiced by Dee Bradley Baker).
- The Red Lantern Corps appear in Injustice 2, consisting of Atrocitus (voiced by Ike Amadi) and Dex-Starr.
- The Red Lantern Corps appear in Scribblenauts Unmasked: A DC Comics Adventure consisting of Abyssma, Atrocitus, Bleez, Rankorr and Skallox.

=== Merchandise ===
- Atrocitus and Bleez received figures in the DC Comics Super Hero Collection.
- Red Lanterns Skallox, Dex-Starr, and Nite-Lik received figures in the Green Lantern Classics toyline in 2011.
- Atrocitus, Mera, and Dex-Starr received figures in the Blackest Night collection.
- Guy Gardner received a figure in the Green Lantern Series 4 collection.
- Atrocitus received a figure in the DC Universe Club Infinite Earths line.

== Collected editions ==
- Red Lanterns Vol. 1: Blood and Rage (collects Red Lanterns #1–7)
- Red Lanterns Vol. 2: Death of the Red Lanterns (collects Red Lanterns #8–12 and Stormwatch #9)
- Stormwatch Vol. 2: Enemies of Earth (collects Red Lanterns #10 and Stormwatch #7–12)
- Red Lanterns Vol. 3: The Second Prophecy (collects Red Lanterns #13–20, #0, and Green Lantern (vol. 5) #20)
- Green Lantern : Rise of the Third Army (collects Green Lantern Annual #1, Green Lantern (vol. 5) #13–16, Green Lantern Corps (vol. 3) #13–16, Green Lantern: New Guardians #13–16, Red Lanterns #13–16, Green Lantern Corps Annual #1, 416 pages, Hardcover, September 10, 2013, ISBN 1-4012-4499-8)
- Green Lantern: Wrath of the First Lantern (collects Green Lantern vol. 5 #17–20, Green Lantern Corps vol. 3 #17–20, Green Lantern: New Guardians #17–20, Red Lanterns #17–20, 416 pages, hardcover, February 25, 2014, ISBN 1-4012-4409-2)
- Red Lanterns Vol. 4: Blood Brothers (collects Red Lanterns #21–26, Green Lantern Annual #2, 176 pages, Paperback, June 3, 2014, ISBN 1-4012-4742-3)
- Green Lantern: Lights Out (collects Green Lantern #24, Green Lantern Corps #24, Green Lantern: New Guardians #23-24, Red Lanterns #24, Green Lantern Annual #2, Green Lantern #23.1: Relic, 192 pages, Hardcover, June 24, 2014, ISBN 1-4012-4816-0)
- Red Lanterns Vol. 5: Atrocities (collects Green Lantern/Red Lanterns #28, Red Lanterns #27, #29-34, Red Lanterns Annual #1, Supergirl #31, 272 pages, Paperback, December 9, 2014, ISBN 1-4012-5090-4)
- Red Lanterns Vol. 6: Forged in Blood (collects Red Lanterns #35-40, Red Lanterns: Futures End #1, Paperback, 2015, ISBN 1-4012-5484-5)
- Red Lanterns: The New 52 Omnibus (collects Green Lantern #23, #23.1, #24, and #28; Green Lantern Corps #24; Green Lantern: New Guardians #24; Green Lantern Annual #2; Infinity Man and the Forever People #5-6; Red Lanterns (vol. 1) #1-40; Red Lanterns Annual #1; Red Lanterns: Futures End #1; Stormwatch #9; and Supergirl (vol. 6) #26-33, 1456 pages, Hardcover, June 10, 2025, ISBN 978-1-79950-176-3)
