= Sinestro Corps =

Comics villains

- Cover to Green Lantern vol. 4 #21. Art by Ivan Reis.

Publication information
- Publisher: DC Comics
- First appearance: Green Lantern vol. 4 #10 (May 2006)
- Created by: Geoff Johns (writer); Ethan Van Sciver (artist)

In-story information
- Base(s): Qward

Roster

The Sinestro Corps, occasionally known as the Yellow Lantern Corps, is a supervillainous group and fascistic analog to the Green Lantern Corps in the DC Universe. They are led by Sinestro, and derive power from the emotional spectrum of fear.

== Publication history ==
The Sinestro Corps first appeared in Green Lantern vol. 4 #10 (May,2006) and was created by Geoff Johns and Ethan Van Sciver.

== Fictional history ==
=== Before the Corps ===
The Parallax entity is a space parasite that is the embodiment of fear and was imprisoned within the Central Power Battery on Oa. This caused green power rings to be weak to the color yellow, and Parallax subsequently became known as the "yellow impurity" over time.

Thaal Sinestro, at the time the universe's greatest Green Lantern, was sent to Earth by Supernova in a plot to erase Guy Gardner from history. Booster Gold was assigned to prevent this from happening. To do so, he convinced Sinestro to leave Earth, claiming that he was an admirer from the future, and that his yellow Legion of Super-Heroes flight ring was a tribute to Sinestro. When asked what Corps he belongs to, Booster ad-libbed, "The... Sinestro Corps", leading Sinestro to twirl his mustache in thought while mumbling, "Of course. Of course."

After Sinestro went rogue, he was banished by the Guardians of the Universe to Qward in the antimatter universe. When he returned, he wielded a power ring which used yellow energy. After various encounters with Earth's Green Lantern, Hal Jordan, he was imprisoned within the Central Power Battery. There he was able to awaken Parallax from hibernation. From there, Parallax and Sinestro were able to influence the fall of Hal Jordan and instigate the fall of the Green Lantern Corps, leaving one last Green Lantern: Kyle Rayner.

=== Recruitment drive ===
The Sinestro Corps gathers on Qward.

After the Green Lantern Corps was restarted with the return of Hal Jordan, the Sinestro Corps began actively recruiting members, offering yellow power rings and a role in the Corps to those who can "instill great fear". Members of the Corps are immediately taken to Qward to "...be subjected to psychological and physical reconditioning". The members of the Sinestro Corps work in sectors, like the Green Lantern Corps. Qward also has a huge yellow Central Battery on its surface like the one used on Oa. Although the Sinestro Corps uses fear, and opposes the Green Lantern Corps and the Guardians, Sinestro has stated their goal is to bring order to the universe, which he claims the Guardians have failed to do.

Arkillo, a large and muscular vicious alien, is enslaving all the Qwardian Weaponers and forcing them to continuously build new yellow rings which are programmed to breach the barrier between the antimatter and matter universes to find and recruit new ring-wielders. Arkillo also serves as the Sinestro Corps' drill sergeant, similar to Kilowog's role in the GLC.

Members recruited include Karu-Sil, raised by animals; Despotellis, a sentient virus capable of attacking Lanterns from the inside; and Bedovian, the sniper of the Corps, capable of taking out a target from three sectors away.

During this time, the Sinestro Corps attempted to recruit Batman, known even to some alien races for his formidable ability to instill fear in others. However, Batman's willpower combined with his previous brief exposure to a power ring allowed him to reject the yellow ring before it took him to be properly trained and molded into one of Sinestro's soldiers. The yellow ring then sought a replacement and selected Amon Sur, the disgruntled son of Abin Sur, who was on Earth attempting to steal Hal Jordan's ring.

=== The prophecy ===
It was revealed that after untold millennia, the Weaponers of Qward, Ranx the Sentient City, the Children of the White Lobe, and the Empire of Tears will rise united against the Green Lantern Corps. This was largely ignored up until upgraded Manhunters started to appear throughout the universe. Hal Jordan encountered one on Earth and, with Guy Gardner, followed their trail to Sector 3601. Hal and Guy found several Green Lanterns, all of whom were assumed to have been killed during Emerald Twilight, and the Manhunters' new grandmaster Hank Henshaw, the Cyborg Superman. The Manhunters were defeated and Henshaw's head was brought to Oa. The Book of Oa has a forbidden chapter on cosmic prophecies, which includes the following:

A face of metal and flesh shall speak of the secrets of the 52.
Fear will rise.
Willpower will gather.
And a war of light will unleash the truth behind the power of the ring.

— Book Of Oa, Green Lantern vol. 4 #20

After his interrogation, the Guardians learned that Henshaw is aware of the main fifty-two parallel universes focused on in the New 52 era and that if New Earth was destroyed, the new Multiverse would collapse and the Antimatter universe would take its place. Two of the Guardians, Ganthet and Sayd, warn the other Guardians not to ignore the prophecy because it could destroy the Green Lantern Corps.

=== The Sinestro Corps War ===
Following his defeat in Green Lantern: Rebirth, the events of Green Lantern: Sinestro Corps Special #1 Sinestro retreats to the planet Qward in the antimatter universe. There he amasses an army, the Sinestro Corps, that he selects based upon their ability to "inspire great fear". Each member is armed with a yellow power ring, mirroring the green ones of the Green Lantern Corps. Amongst Sinestro's allies are Parallax and the resurrected Anti-Monitor. The Sinestro Corps then launches an all-out assault against the Green Lantern Corps and the universe itself. During the assault on Oa, the Sinestro Corps manages to inflict heavy casualties and free Superman-Prime and the Cyborg Superman from their imprisonment. Kyle Rayner is captured and transported to Qward, where Sinestro manages to separate Rayner from the symbiote Ion allowing Parallax to possess him.Hal Jordan, John Stewart, and Guy Gardner return to Earth to warn the Justice League of the Anti-Monitor's return.

As the Sinestro Corps spreads out to ambush Green Lanterns across the universe, Green Lantern vol. 4 #23 sees the Guardians deciding to rewrite their sacred text, the Book of Oa. They add ten new laws, the first of which authorizes the use of lethal force against the Sinestro Corps. As the Green Lanterns gather on Oa in preparation for a Sinestro Corps assault, the Sinestro Corps teleport themselves and their Central Power Battery instead to a new Warworld, their objective revealed to be Earth. Events in Green Lantern Corps vol. 2 #16 show Hal informing the Green Lantern Corps of Sinestro's plans.

Green Lantern vol. 4 #24 continues the story, with Green Lanterns and Sinestro Corps members battling across Earth. Hal manages to free Kyle from Parallax before the entity is imprisoned in their power batteries by Ganthet and Sayd. After John and Guy arrive, the former Guardians reveal to them the prophecy of the "Blackest Night", seen in Green Lantern vol. 4 #25. It foretells of five more Corps arising, each based on a different color and emotion. After the five corps are established, a "War of Light" will ensue, in which all the corps are destroyed, leading to the "Blackest Night".

The Guardians arrive on Earth and appoint Sodam Yat to be the new Ion. After a lengthy struggle in New York City, the Sinestro Corps are defeated by the overwhelming numbers against them. One of the Guardians sacrifices himself to send Superman-Prime to an alternate universe, while Hal and Kyle subdue and arrest Sinestro in Coast City. In the aftermath of the battle, seen in Green Lantern vol. 4 #25, the Guardians decide to bring the second of the new laws into effect. After realizing that the "Blackest Night" prophecy will come to pass, Ganthet and Sayd depart after creating a blue power ring with the intention of creating their own Corps, powered by the blue light of hope.

=== Blackest Night ===
Following the Sinestro Corps War, the Green Lantern Corps tracked down the abandoned Sinestro rings and prevented them from finding new bearers. Among these is Amon Sur's ring, which attempts to recruit the self-proclaimed "Master of Fear", Jonathan Crane. The surviving members of the Sinestro Corps continue to try to bring fear to the Green Lanterns, in part by murdering the family members of Green Lanterns. Meanwhile, Mongul (who had since obtained a yellow ring in the aftermath of the war) begins his quest to take command of the Sinestro Corps in their namesake's absence. After obtaining an additional five rings by killing corpsmen who refused to follow him, Mongul takes over the planet Daxam and then a large contingent of the Sinestro Corps, after besting Arkillo in one-on-one combat, he becomes the new leader of the Sinestro Corps. In Rage of the Red Lanterns #1, a group of rogue Sinestro Corps members still loyal to Sinestro release him from Green Lantern custody as he is being transferred for execution. Their rescue attempt is temporarily spoiled by an attack from Atrocitus and his newly formed Red Lantern Corps.

Sinestro is abducted by Atrocitus' forces and brought to the Red Lantern base planet: Ysmault. Planning to use Sinestro's blood for their own means, Sinestro's faction of the Sinestro Corps eventually arrive and liberate him from the Red Lanterns. After their escape, Sinestro and his faction of the Sinestro Corps return to Qward, revealing that there is a backup Central Power Battery. Sinestro orders his men to free the Sinestro Corps members imprisoned on Zamaron by the Star Sapphires and meet him on the darkside of Daxam's moon. After Sinestro attends to "family business", they will retake the Sinestro Corps from Mongul. In addition to those members imprisoned on Zamaron, Sinestro Corps members are also being held prisoner on Oa. Their power rings are held in containment along with other rings (abandoned due to casualty in war) that were prevented from finding new bearers. When Red Lantern Vice is freed from confinement in his Sciencell, he attacks the Green Lantern jailer. Though the imprisoned members of the Sinestro Corps initially cheer him on, they find that he is just as likely of attacking them in his rage. During the jail break, Scar frees the yellow power rings and they find their bearers in the Sciencells. Upon being reunited with her ring, Lyssa Drak claims to once again be able to feel the Book of Parallax. Now armed with their rings, the Sinestro Corps join in the battle with the Green Lanterns and Vice.

The faction of the Sinestro Corps led by Sinestro are planning an invasion of Zamaron to retake the female Corps members being held prisoner there. After being repelled from Daxam, Mongul's faction (which he has renamed as "The Mongul Corps") invades Korugar. Sinestro's rescue attempt is interrupted by a Black Lantern attack, which he only survives through the arrival of Hal Jordan and Indigo-1, leader of the Indigo Tribe. Indigo-1 brings Sinestro to Korugar, so that he may finally confront Mongul. After a fierce battle, Sinestro activates the override systems in Mongul's rings, using them to imprison him inside the Sinestro Corps Central Power Battery, thus overthrowing Mongul, taking control of the Mongul Corps, and renaming it "The Sinestro Corps" after himself. When he departs with Hal Jordan's group of light-wielders, he commands his Corps to gather at Korugar and protect it while he is away.

In the aftermath of Blackest Night, the Sinestro Corps and Green Lantern Corps maintain a fragile truce where neither will attack each other. However, while helping Hal Jordan and the ring-wielders of the other five corps investigate the abduction of the emotional entities, Sinestro is separated from his ring and imprisoned in the Book of the Black, along with the other five members of the group, with Hal only just managing to escape with their rings. When Sinestro and the others escape, renegade Guardian Krona takes command of their rings, prompting Sinestro to attack Krona on his own, with the unexpected result that he is once again chosen as a Green Lantern.

=== The New 52 ===
Returning to Korugar after the Guardians decide to leave him with the ring, Sinestro learns that his Corps have reverted to their brutal methods, terrorising and slaughtering the people of Korugar rather than ruling it, Sinestro creating a new Green Lantern ring for Hal Jordan albeit one that he can shut off at will so that Jordan can help him retake control of the Sinestro Corps, who now want him dead in the belief that his killer will become the new Sinestro Corps leader. After turning various Korugarian prisoners into a temporary Green Lantern Corps using short-lived duplicates of Sinestro's ring, Sinestro and Hal are able to hold off the Sinestro Corps long enough to drain the power away from the Central Power Battery of the Sinestro Corps, de-powering all of the Corps members on Korugar, although those more distant from the battery will still have access to their own power supplies. Later all Lanterns' rings registered that the Sinestro Corps have disbanded with 98% of all known Corpsmen dead or incarcerated, requiring Arkillo to use a new, independent power battery forged by the Weaponer from the fear of the Korugarians. It has since been revealed that the Guardians were responsible for Sinestro acquiring a Green Lantern ring in an attempt to undermine the Sinestro Corps as part of their future plans to destroy all seven Corps.

During the events of Forever Evil after the Crime Syndicate had taken control of much of Earth, Batman revealed that he harbored a Sinestro Corps ring since the organization's attack on Earth as one of his weapons to deploy against the Justice League should they ever go rogue. When Batman and his allies at the time are attacked by Power Ring, Batman puts the Sinestro Corps ring on in an attempt to counterattack him. However, the ring's power is heavily depleted and Power Ring manages to get it off Batman's finger before ultimately being attacked by Sinestro himself, who was summoned to the planet by Batman's use of the ring. In a brief ensuing battle, Sinestro severs Power Ring's arm from his body, causing his ring to deem him unworthy and leave. As Power Ring thanks Sinestro for freeing him from the curse of the ring, Sinestro incinerates him.

In the aftermath of the war with the New Gods of New Genesis, Sinestro has shaped Warworld into the new base and headquarters of the Sinestro Corps, after the Green Lantern Corps have vanished into another universe.

=== DC Rebirth ===
Subsequently, in DC Rebirth, Sinestro uses the opportunity to establish the Sinestro Corps as the new force of 'order' in the universe, imposing fear rather than inspiring faith, with Soranik joining her father out of a lack of perceived options. However, as they establish a presence where Oa was once located, Hal Jordan forges a new ring for himself as the rest of the Corps return to this universe.

Sinestro then sends out his enforcers of his Corps to control the new order of the universe. The Sinestro Corps attacks a planet, but soon Hal Jordan arrives with his restored Green Lantern powers and drives the Sinestro Corp back.

== Prominent members ==
Prominent members of the Corps, including (clockwise from top left): the Cyborg Superman (Hank Henshaw), Superman-Prime, the Anti-Monitor, Parallax (Kyle Rayner), and Sinestro. Art by Ethan Van Sciver.

Like the Green Lantern Corps, the Sinestro Corps has 7,200 ring bearers, two for each of the 3,600 sectors of space.

=== Leadership ===
- Thaal Sinestro (of Sector 1417): A former Green Lantern who was discharged for abusing his power. Sinestro later allies with the Weaponers of Qward, obtains a yellow power ring, and becomes the leader of the Sinestro Corps.
- Arkillo (of Sector 674): A feared warrior from the planet Vorn who became one of Sinestro's first recruits. He is a drill sergeant within the Corps, similar to Kilowog.

=== Ring bearers ===
- Ampa Nnn (of Sector 3517): A serial killer from the planet Lythyl, who has a habit of removing the organs of his victims and meticulously cleaning them.
- Bedovian (of Sector 3): A hermit crab-like cannibalistic sniper.
- Bekka: A warrior of New Genesis, having encountered Sinestro in Sector 1014 and being given an invitation.
- Borialosaurus (of Sector 3001): The oldest member of the Sinestro Corps and one of the only surviving members of a carnivorous aquatic species from the Guardian's homeworld of Maltus that were hunted down after killing dozens of the Guardians.
- Braach (of Sector 3064): A Selachian who feeds on the endangered space dolphins, attracting the attention of space dolphin lover Lobo.
- Despotellis (of Sector 119): A sentient, artificial virus created on the planet Khondra that can kill from within, responsible for the death of 85% of Space Sector 119 in addition to Kyle Rayner's mother.
- DevilDog (of Sector 1567): A convicted murderer on at least 17 planets.
- Feena Sik (of Sector 2897): A famous artist who discovered a ritual to bring her creations to life and slaughtered any living thing whose blood the ritual required, including her husband, earning her the attention of a yellow power ring.
- Flayt (of Sector 2751): A Power-ray from the planet Tristram, known for draining the power out of hundreds of passing starships, rendering them stranded.
- Haasp the Hunter (of Sector 3492): Murderous brother of the Green Lantern Harvid. Imprisoned by his brother for illegal hunting, Haasp has made Harvid his next "big game".
- Karu-Sil (of Sector 2815): A village girl from the planet Graxos III whose family was killed during a raid on her village, leaving her to fend for herself in the bordering jungle while being raised by animals. After being rescued, Karu-Sil obtains a power ring and joins the Sinestro Corps.
- Kiriazis (of Sector 1771): A Sinestro Corps member who "blinds and tortures, splintering the Ring's beams with her prisms." She was later said to be able to use her spider-like physiology to metabolize the ring's energy and produce spider web out of it.
- Kretch (of Sector 3545): A demonic being from the planet Soh. He can transform into a massive supernova capable of engulfing entire cities.
- Kryb (of Sector 3599): A hag from the planet Vora who kills Green Lanterns and stores their children in a cage on her back.
- Low (of Sector 3308): A parasitic slug-like alien who can drain blood in seconds. He reproduces by laying eggs in the bodies he kills, birthing up to a thousand parasitic slugs from a single carcass.
- Lyssa Drak (of Sector 3500): The keeper of the Book of Parallax.
- Maash (of Sector 863): Conceived as triplets, Maash was later fused into one body, with three faces stacked one on top of the other. The top head is an innocent personality, unable to stop the two more vicious personalities from controlling their body.
- Mallow (of Sector 614): The leader of a bloodthirsty group of marauders, whose hideout is in the center of a violent asteroid storm.
- Moose (of Sector 3333): A mammoth-like alien. His real name is unpronounceable, so his ring chose the closest approximation.
- Murr the Melting Man (Austin Snow) (of Sector 3490): A scientist from the asteroid outpost DW-426 who possesses a fatal touch.
- Ranx the Sentient City (of Sector 3272): An intelligent, free-floating robotic city that is prophesied to kill Mogo.
- Romat-Ru (of Sector 2813): A Xudarian who is regarded as one of the vilest creatures in the universe.
- Scivor (of Sector 3106): Once posed as a torture god of Aplic-Toh, influencing thousands to murder on his behalf. He possesses unmatched powers of persuasion.
- Seer Ruggle (of Sector 2700): The Bomb Mistress of the planet Rorc who created six blink bombs throughout the universe, one of which she gave to the Children of the White Lobe to destroy Mogo.
- Setag Retss (of Sector 1155): An aquatic reptilian alien from the Rexulus system. His ring allows him to breathe outside of water.
- Sirket (of Sector 1110): An insect who lives in the Bleed, the space between dimensions.
- Slushh (of Sector 3376): A polymorphous being composed of a corrosive fluid that liquifies flesh instantly.
- Sn'Hoj (of Sector 3201): Known for attacking starships, assimilating their technology, and killing the crew.
- Snap Trap (of Sector 3189): A humanoid crocodile who uses his hypnotic eyes to lure in his prey. He then devours the victim's spines, leaving them alive and in agony.
- Smithwick (of Sector 1418): Belongs to the same species as Salaak, whom he has sworn to kill.
- Stanch (of Sector 3560): A once benevolent being who was corrupted by the pollution of his world, becoming a monstrous killer of the skies.
- Tekik (of Sector 3281): A robot created on the planet Potter-59-3 that rebelled against its life of servitude, creating a "fear program" that infected every other robot on the planet. The planet never recovered from Tekik's attack, and has since been abandoned and renamed "the lost world".
- The Weaponer (of Sector -1): The Weaponer created Sinestro's original yellow ring. He later lured Sinestro to Qward to destroy him. After he was defeated, he accepted Sinestro's invitation to join his corps.
- Yellow Lantern (of Sector 1284, an anagram of Sector 2814): A citizen of Bizarro World who is selected as a member of the Sinestro Corps. He ignores the ring's commands until the ring overrides his free will and takes him to the battlefield.

=== Former members ===
- Amon Sur (of Sector 2814): The son of deceased Green Lantern Abin Sur who became leader of the Black Circle Crime Syndicate until being overthrown in a battle with Kyle Rayner. Amon later battles John Stewart, during which he is inducted into the Sinestro Corps. Amon is later killed by Laira, and his ring attempts to find a new wielder before the Guardians destroy it.
- Anti-Monitor (of Sector -1): A cosmic entity and the guardian of the anti-matter universe.
- Batman (Bruce Wayne) (of Sector 2814): A yellow power ring attempted to induct him into the Sinestro Corps during the Sinestro Corps War but Batman managed to remove the ring from his finger causing the ring to fly off. Batman later uses a Sinestro Corps power ring to battle Power Ring during the Forever Evil storyline.
- Bur'Gunza (of Sector 3561): A seemingly model prisoner on Takron-Galtos. When his restraints were removed, he killed forty-two guards before being brought down. He was killed by Bolphunga during the Sciencell riots.
- Clark Kent / Superman (of Sector 2813): Superman became a Yellow Lantern for a while in the Injustice comics.
- Duel Eknham (of Sector 3550): A Siamese twin-like pair of doctors from the planet Sedas with two faces and personalities. One side wishes to kill and maim in the most gruesome ways possible, while the other prefers more sophisticated methods of murder. Both are later killed in battle with the Green Lanterns. Eknhan's name is a reversal of artist Doug Mahnke's last name.
- Enkafos (of Sector 2981): A strategist who coordinated the Sinestro Corps attack on Mogo and was ultimately killed by Sodam Yat. Ethan Van Sciver described Enkafos as an analogue to the Green Lantern Corps' Salaak.
- Fatality (of Sector 1313): A longtime enemy of the Green Lantern Corps who is later captured and rehabilitated by the Star Sapphires.
- Flash (of Sector 2814): After the Flash was possessed by Parallax during the Brightest Day, he temporarily became the Sinestro Corps member of Sector 2814.
- Gleen (of Sector 312): A Krolotean who has tampered with the evolutionary patterns of over a thousand species. Amongst his species, Gleen is considered the cruelest and most twisted. He is later killed by Alpha Lantern Varix.
- Gorgor (of Sector 3215): An expert tracker who tracked Sinestro to Earth after his leaders apparent "betrayal". He is later killed and his ring destroyed.
- Hal Jordan (of Sector 2814): A Green Lantern officer given a couple of yellow power rings during the Sinestro Corps War since his own ring had run low on power and he was unable to recharge it at the time, though it did not work out as planned. During the "War of the Green Lanterns" storyline, Jordan is forced to remove his Green Lantern ring to prevent him from becoming the host of Parallax again and takes Sinestro's ring as a replacement due to his previous experience with using a Sinestro Corps ring.
- Cyborg-Superman (Hank Henshaw) (of Sector 2814): A cyborg and ally of the Manhunters. Although he works with the Sinestro Corps, he does so solely so that he can die; he is loyal to the Anti-Monitor alone knowing that he can kill him for once and for all.
- Horku (of Sector 2): Member of the same race as the Green Lantern Honnu. He was later killed by Honnu near Mount Rushmore.
- Imecsub: An insect-like alien who was captured by Sodam Yat and Arisia Rrab. While in a holding cell in Sector House 2815, he was crushed to death by a spacecraft belonging to Sodam's mother Cara. His name and appearance are derived from actor Steve Buscemi.
- Lex Luthor (of Sector 2814): An enemy of Superman who temporarily joins the Sinestro Corps after stealing Scarecrow's ring.
- Lobo (of Sector 3500): In the New 52, after being given a bounty to kill Sinestro, he is given the opportunity to use his skills for the Yellow Lanterns.
- Mongul (of Sector 2811): The son of a longtime foe of Superman also named Mongul. He obtains a power ring from an unspecified Sinestro Corps member before Sinestro defeats him and traps him in the Corps' power battery.
- Narok (of Sector 2449): An octopus-like alien who previously imprisoned his sister and forced her to devour her children. He was killed by the Black Lantern Harbinger.
- Peacemaker (of Sector 2814): Selected from Earth to join the Sinestro Corps, the alien Reach place a beetle scarab in his spine to make him a joint agent with the intention of assassinating Jaime Reyes, the Blue Beetle. However, with Blue Beetle's help, Peacemaker is able to resist the ring and the scarab, removing both.
- The Quintet Squad: Five siblings (Ena, Pente, Tessera, Theo, and Tria) belonging to an unidentified species. They attacked the families of Green Lanterns, raining the eyes of their victims over Oa. Four of them were brought in by the Green Lanterns, except for Ena, who killed herself to avoid capture.
- Scarecrow (Jonathan Crane) (of Sector 2814): A criminally insane college psychiatrist and recurring opponent of Batman who is selected by a duplicate of Sinestro's ring as a deputy to the Sinestro Corps during the Blackest Night crisis.Lex Luthor, overwhelmed by the orange light of greed, steals his ring.
- Schlagg-Man (of Sector 3493): A native of the planet Bismoll who had his teeth removed after biting through a policeman's neck. He has since had his teeth replaced with Bismollian steel, allowing him to bite through anything. He is later executed by the Alpha Lanterns.
- Starro: An alien parasite that creates copies of itself which take possession of sentient organisms and take control of their minds.
- Superboy-Prime (of Sector 2813): A younger, alternate dimension version of Superman from Earth Prime and a main antagonist from Infinite Crisis.
- Tri-Eye (of Sector 3145): A fearsome traveling creature who uses his three mouths to tear his victims to pieces and devour them, leaving no trace left. He is executed by the Alpha Lanterns following the Sciencell riots.
- Ugg-I (of Sector 53): A female alien with an eye placed where a human mouth would be located and two mouths where human eyes would be located. She is killed by the Alpha Lanterns during the mass execution of the Sciencell prisoners on Oa.
- Vril Dox (of Sector 1287): While battling the Black Lantern version of his wife Stealth, Dox was chosen by the slain Narok's ring to be his successor. He is later discharged from the Corps following his repeated refusal to follow Sinestro's orders and go to Korugar.

== Oath ==
When recharging their power rings, members of the Sinestro Corps recite the following oath:

:In blackest day, in brightest night,

Beware your fears made into light
Let those who try to stop what's right,
Burn like my power(*)... Sinestro's might(**)!

— Sinestro, Green Lantern: Sinestro Corps Special #1 (June 2007)

- (*) "My power" becomes "his power" when recited by other members of the Corps.
- (**) "Sinestro's might" became for a time "Arkillo's might", when Arkillo was the only active Sinestro Corps member prior to its rebirth.

== Entity ==
As the embodiment of fear which is connected to the yellow light of the Emotional Spectrum, Parallax is revealed to be the emotional entity for the Sinestro Corps. Born when one of the earliest life forms first felt terror, it is insect-like in appearance. Parallax was the first of the seven entities to be captured by a still unknown person and was held captive in Ryut. The Sinestro Corps insignia is based on drawings created by life forms who looked into the mouth of Parallax and lived to tell the tale.

== Book of Parallax ==
The Book of Parallax documents the history of the Sinestro Corps and its members. It is overseen by Lyssa Drak.

== Weapons and equipment ==
A Yellow Power Ring

Members of the Sinestro Corps use yellow power rings built on Qward. Though functionally similar to a Green Lantern's power ring, yellow power rings are fueled by fear instead of willpower. Members are selected for their skill at intimidation and terror. The ring amplifies the aggressive tendencies of the wearer. The yellow rings are charged by yellow power batteries, which are in turn linked to a yellow Central Power Battery based on Korugar. Aside from the recharging limitations common among the various Corps, their only known weakness is that their power can be drained by a Blue Lantern's power ring.

== In other media ==
=== Television ===
The Sinestro Corps appear in the Justice League Action episode "The Ringer", consisting of Sinestro and Despotellis.

=== Film ===
- The Sinestro Corps appear in a future prophecy depicted in the "Abin Sur" segment of Green Lantern: Emerald Knights, consisting of Sinestro, Arkillo, Lyssa Drak, Kryb, Maash, Karu-Sil, Romat-Ru, Slussh, and Tri-eye.
- The Sinestro Corps appear in Green Lantern: Beware My Power, consisting of Lyssa Drak and Sinestro as prominent members and two minor unnamed members.

=== Video games ===
- The Sinestro Corps make a cameo appearance in Green Lantern's ending in Mortal Kombat vs. DC Universe.
- The Sinestro Corps appear in DC Universe Online.
- An alternate universe incarnation of the Sinestro Corps appear in Injustice: Gods Among Us, consisting of Sinestro and Hal Jordan. Additionally, Damian Wayne becomes a Yellow Lantern in his non-canonical arcade mode ending.
- The Sinestro Corps appear in Lego Batman 3: Beyond Gotham, with Sinestro and Arkillo appearing as playable characters while Batman's Sinestro Corps uniform appears as a downloadable alternate skin.

=== Miscellaneous ===
The Sinestro Corps appear in Smallville Season 11. This version of the group was created by Parallax and is served by the Manhunters as heralds. In the "Lantern" arc, Parallax possesses John Stewart and sends yellow power rings to Earth, where they choose Arkham Asylum inmates, such as Man-Bat, Firefly, Bane, Mr. Freeze, and Poison Ivy, before they are all defeated by Superman and the Green Lantern Corps and depowered by Emil Hamilton. In the "Chaos" arc, Lex Luthor employs a security force empowered by yellow power rings until they are defeated and depowered by Booster Gold and Skeets.
