= Green Lantern: Emerald Knights =

2011 film by Lauren Montgomery

- Cover of the U.S. Blu-ray
- Directed by: Christopher Berkeley; Lauren Montgomery; Jay Oliva
- Written by: Eddie Berganza; Alan Burnett; Todd Casey; Dave Gibbons; Michael Green; Marc Guggenheim; Geoff Johns; Peter Tomasi
- Based on: "Mogo Doesn't Socialize" and "Abin Sur" by Alan Moore
- Produced by: Donald De Line; Greg Berlanti; Lauren Montgomery
- Starring: Nathan Fillion; Jason Isaacs; Elisabeth Moss; Henry Rollins; Arnold Vosloo
- Edited by: Margaret Hou
- Music by: Christopher Drake
- Production companies: Warner Premiere; DC Entertainment; Warner Bros. Animation
- Distributed by: Warner Home Video
- Release date: June 7, 2011
- Running time: 84 minutes
- Country: United States
- Language: English

Green Lantern: Emerald Knights is a 2011 American animated superhero film that tells various stories featuring members of Green Lantern Corps, including Abin Sur, Laira, Kilowog, and Mogo. It was released on June 7, 2011. While not a direct sequel to First Flight, the film uses the same character designs.

It is the eleventh film released under the DC Universe Animated Original Movies banner. It is also the second DC Animated Movie following Batman: Gotham Knight to feature an anthology format, though unlike the latter, it features a single, uniform animation and visual style and an overall linking story. Animation was outsourced to Studio 4°C, JM Animation and Studio Pierrot. The film received mixed-to-positive reviews with many critics praising the animation, voice acting, and action sequences, but criticizing the story and characterization.

Two of the stories ("Mogo Doesn't Socialize" and "Abin Sur") were based on comic stories written by Alan Moore, who has a standing policy of not allowing his name to be used in the credits when his stories are adapted to other media. Although it uses the same name, it has no relation with the 1998 comic book Emerald Knights.

Despite the film featuring a standalone story, Nathan Fillion would later reprise the Green Lantern role in several DC Animated Movie Universe films, as well as playing Guy Gardner in the live-action DC Universe.

== Plot ==
=== Intro ===
The sun of the Green Lantern Corps' homeworld, Oa, is becoming a gateway for an anti-matter entity called Krona. In response, the Guardians of the Universe start evacuating Oa of all valuables, such as the Central Battery. While in line to charge their power rings before the Battery is removed, new recruit Arisia Rrab admits she lacks faith in her abilities. Hearing this, Hal Jordan tells her the story of the first Green Lantern.

=== Green Lantern ===
Avra, the Guardians' humble scribe, was chosen by one of the Corps' first four power rings despite not being a warrior. He, G'Hu, Wachet and Blu are tasked with stopping the Dominators, but Blu is killed in battle. Nonetheless, Avra uses his imagination to create the first ring construct and lead his allies in destroying the Dominator fleet. Since then, shaping constructs from the power rings became the standard operating procedure. After his death, Avra's ring is passed down through the years, eventually coming into Abin Sur and Jordan's possession.

=== Wraparound #1 ===
At present, Jordan and Arisia meet Kilowog, the Green Lantern Corps' head drill sergeant. Jordan tells her not to fear Kilowog and recounts the story of Kilowog's own trainer.

=== Kilowog ===
Sergeant Deegan trained the rookie Kilowog, among others, by removing their power rings and putting them into deadly situations. An angry Kilowog accused Deegan of not valuing his trainees' lives before they and the recruits were called to defend a nearby planet from the Khunds. Deegan abandoned Kilowog to lead the other recruits, ordering them to protect the refugees while he fought the invaders. Once Kilowog caught up, Deegan had been mortally wounded. Before he died, the latter revealed he was doing what was best for the rookies and passed his authority to Kilowog, who completed the mission.

=== Wraparound #2 ===
Jordan and Arisia arrive at a border patrol at the sun to await Krona's return, where they hear a prophecy from Laira, whereupon Jordan shares Laira's story.

=== Laira ===
For her first solo mission, Laira was sent back to her homeworld, Jayd, to address war crimes committed by her people. After learning they were ordered by her father, who was driven into rage and jealousy after her ring chose her instead of him the day when his sector's Green Lantern died in battle, she defeated him in combat, after which he admitted she had truly become an adult before committing ritual suicide to maintain his honor. He died in Laira's arms, claiming that she was Jayd's true protector, not him.

=== Wraparound #3 ===
Back at the border patrol, every Lantern extant is called to await Krona's return, with the apparent exception of Mogo. When Arisia asks who Mogo is, Jordan explains.

=== Mogo Doesn't Socialize ===
The warmonger Bolphunga sought to fight and kill the universe's most powerful warriors. After his latest opponent Kloba Vud tells him he will never defeat Mogo, Bolphunga traveled to a mysterious planet in search of him. He spent weeks tracking a plethora of powerful energy signatures, but his search proved fruitless and he planted explosives to flush out Mogo. However, Bolphunga soon discovered Mogo is the planet itself as the latter extinguished the bombs and captured him before he could escape.

=== Wraparound #4 ===
At Oa's sun, Jordan and Arisia are attacked by Krona's Shadow Demons and rescued by Sinestro, who speaks of the prophecy that Oa will be destroyed and relates a story of Abin.

=== Abin Sur ===
While capturing Atrocitus, Abin and Sinestro discussed Atrocitus' prophecies, with Sinestro insisting that he does not believe in destiny. Abin took Atrocitus to the prison planet Ysmault, where Atrocitus spoke of Abin's imminent death, Sinestro's betrayal, and the formation of a fear-based Lantern Corps. Refusing to believe his friend would do so, Abin imprisoned Atrocitus.

=== Emerald Knights ===
As Krona emerges, the Corps fight his shadow demons, but suffer heavy casualties. While regrouping, Arisia devises a plan to kill Krona with an equal or greater amount of matter to counter his anti-matter. The Corps fall back to Oa and push it towards the sun. The Shadow Demons kill more of their number until Mogo arrives, killing Krona and destroying Oa.

In the aftermath, Mogo agrees to become the Green Lantern Corps' temporary base until they build a new Oa while Arisia receives an entry in the Book of Oa for her ingenuity.

== Cast ==
- Nathan Fillion as Hal Jordan / Green Lantern
- Elisabeth Moss as Arisia Rrab
- Jason Isaacs as Sinestro
- Henry Rollins as Kilowog
- Kelly Hu as Laira Omoto
- Roddy Piper as Bolphunga
- Arnold Vosloo as Abin Sur
- Tony Amendola as Kentor Omoto, Appa Ali Apsa (uncredited)
- Steve Blum as Kloba Vud, Palaqua (uncredited), Ranakar (uncredited), G'Hu (uncredited), additional voices
- Grey DeLisle as Ree'Yu, Ardakian Trawl (uncredited), Boodikka (uncredited)
- Michael Jackson as Ganthet
- Peter Jessop as Salaak
- David Kaufman as Rubyn Omoto
- Sunil Malhotra as Bolphunga's ship
- Andrea Romano as Abin Sur's ring, Deegan's ring (uncredited)
- Jane Singer as Wachet
- James Arnold Taylor as Tomar-Re
- Bruce Thomas as Atrocitus
- Bruce Timm as Galius Zed (uncredited)
- Mitchell Whitfield as Avra
- Wade Williams as Deegan
- Gwendoline Yeo as Blu

== Release ==
In 2013, a DVD of the film was included as a bonus disc in a special edition of the video game Scribblenauts Unmasked: A DC Comics Adventure that was sold exclusively at Walmart.

== Reception ==
The film has received a mostly mixed to positive reception. Joey Esposito of IGN praised the film's visuals, voice acting, and action sequences, but criticized its thin plot and characterization. Esposito felt that it was difficult to connect emotionally with the characters, and asserted that Emerald Knights was best watched by established fans of the Green Lantern comics series. In a review for DVD Talk, Jamie Rich also praised the animation and action sequences, while panning the film's storyline. Rich also recommended the film to "true Lantern fans" in particular. On the other hand, Alan Kistler of Newsarama called it "a solid feature [that] should be enjoyed by any Green Lantern fan, as well as anyone who knows nothing about the comic and wants to learn." Joseph Szadkowski of The Washington Times praised the design decisions made in the making of the film and, specifically, called the fight between Laira and her father one of the best animated hand-to-hand combat sequences that he had ever seen.

Green Lantern: Emerald Knights earned $3,468,925 from domestic home video DVD sales and $2,228,971 from domestic Blu-ray sales, bringing its total domestic home video earnings to $5,697,896.
