= Guardians of the Universe =

Fictional extraterrestrial race in the DC Comics universe

Oans
- Guardians of the Universe as seen in Green Lantern Secret Files (2005). Art by Jamal Igle.

Publication information
- Publisher: DC Comics
- First appearance: Green Lantern (vol. 2) #1 (July 1960)
- Created by: John Broome (writer); Gil Kane (artist)

Characteristics
- Place of origin: Oa, formerly Maltus
- Notable members: Appa Ali Apsa; Ganthet; Sayd; Scar
- Inherent abilities: Near-omniscience; Superhuman intellect; Cosmic awareness; Dimensional manipulation; Force field projection; Light projection; Time Manipulation; Invulnerability; Teleportation; Reality warping; Biological manipulation; Size manipulation; Life force siphoning; Genetic manipulation; Energy manipulation; Matter manipulation; Immortality; Telepathy; Illusion casting; Astral projection; Telekinesis; Phasing

The Guardians of the Universe are a race of extraterrestrial superhero characters appearing in American comic books published by DC Comics, commonly in association with Green Lantern. They first appeared in Green Lantern (vol. 2) #1 (July 1960), and were created by John Broome and Gil Kane. The Guardians of the Universe have been adapted to a number of films, television programs, and video games.

The Guardians of the Universe are the founders and leaders of the interstellar law enforcement agency known as the Green Lantern Corps, which they administer from their homeworld Oa at the center of the Universe. The Guardians resemble short humans with blue skin and white hair. They are depicted as being immortal and are the oldest living beings created in the Universe.

== History ==
=== Background ===
The Guardians evolved on the planet Maltus, being among the first intelligent life forms in the universe. At this time, they were tall, grayish-blue humanoids with black hair, who resembled humans except for their skin color. They became scientists and thinkers, experimenting on the worlds around them. One experiment led to the creation of a new species, the Psions. Billions of years ago, a Maltusian named Krona used time-bending technology to observe the beginning of the Universe. However, this experiment, and later attempts to stop it, unleashed disaster upon all existence. Krona's experiment created the multiverse and the antimatter universe of Qward.

Feeling responsible for this, the Maltusians relocated to the planet Oa (at "the center of the Universe") and assumed the mantle of the "Guardians". Their goal was simple: combat evil and create an orderly universe. This was accomplished through the establishment of the Green Lantern Corps, an interstellar police force which patrols the universe. The Guardians changed physically to survive the harsher conditions of Oa: they lost half their height, with larger heads and white hair.

The Guardians originally sought to bring order to the universe through the Manhunters, self-regulating androids programmed with a specific moral and ethical code. The Manhunters operated as cosmic police officers, much like the later Green Lanterns. They protected civilization and maintained peace in the Universe for millions of years, patrolling 3,600 sectors into which the cosmos had been divided.

The Manhunters slowly became disillusioned with their work, concluding that evil was intrinsic to all biological life and therefore would never be truly eradicated. This resulted in the Manhunters turning on those they were sworn to protect, starting with the inhabitants of Sector 666. Before the Guardians intervened, the entire sector had only a small handful of survivors. Most Manhunters were decommissioned after the massacre of Sector 666, but the ones that escaped became the sworn enemies of the Guardians.

The Manhunter rebellion, and its exposure of the seeming futility of trying to police the universe, caused the Guardians to split into groups with different goals. The Controllers declared their intention to dominate all life and shape it to remove the problem of evil. The Zamarons, who gradually came to include all female Oans, decided to focus on self-improvement and the rediscovery of their lost emotions, eventually leaving Oa for another world. Over the years, both groups evolved to look dissimilar to the remaining Guardians.

Survivors of the massacre of Sector 666 – beings labelled "demons" – banded together to form a nation called the Empire of Tears, which opposed the Guardians' efforts and philosophy. They used dark magic to create a galaxy-spanning realm of chaos and evil. The Guardians eventually defeated the Empire and imprisoned its leaders, the Five Inversions, on the bleak world of Ysmault. The Guardians decided that magic was chaotic and posed a threat to the balance they desired to achieve. They labored to destroy sources of magic and suppress or imprison its users throughout the Universe. They succeeded in compacting much of the chaotic magic energy of the Cosmos and imprisoning it inside a star; part of it eventually escaped to become the Starheart used by Alan Scott.

=== Modern history ===
Oa's defensive systems

The Guardians were almost wiped out in the events of Emerald Twilight, the only survivor being Ganthet. They sacrificed themselves to create one final power ring, a power ring perhaps more powerful than all others before it. Oa was itself destroyed in a battle between Parallax and Kyle Rayner, but rebuilt as the final wish of Hal Jordan's power ring. The Guardians are restored when Rayner, as Ion, recharged the Central Power Battery. Rayner lost his power and role as Ion but this sacrifice released all the Guardian's life forces from the dormancy in his ring. The Immortals first appeared as children but aged quickly and many seem to have returned to the identities they had before they created Rayner's power ring. Unlike before, however, the Guardians are male and female, rather than just male. While Rayner had made them children in order for them to grow up and become less cold than their predecessors, this had not worked. Instead, the Guardians were as cold and manipulative as they were before the Emerald Twilight, with the exception of Ganthet and Sayd. With their revival, the Guardians rebuild the Green Lantern Corps and create a planet-wide armor and defensive system to protect Oa. The Guardians expel Ganthet and Sayd from their rank, because of the discovery that they were in a relationship. Another reason for their expulsion was their quotation from the forbidden chapter of the Book of Oa, which contained the prophecy of the Blackest Night.

In the aftermath of the War, Ganthet and Sayd create blue power rings and batteries, planning to create another intergalactic police force to aid the Guardians and the Green Lantern Corps. During the Blackest Night, the Guardians finally realized that Ganthet and Sayd were correct in their interpretation of the prophecy. However, the Guardian Scar kills another Guardian and binds the rest to prevent them from interfering. She later sends a number of black power rings to the Green Lantern Corps' memorial, reviving the deceased members of the Corps as undead Black Lanterns. She also weakens Oa's planetary defenses for an attack from the Black Lantern Corps.

==== The New 52 ====
With Kyle Rayner having rebelled against the Guardians to join the 'New Guardians', a makeshift team consisting of representatives from all seven Corps, Hal Jordan's expulsion (although he has been forced to assist Sinestro's activities), and the 'recommendations' of the now-emotionless Ganthet, the Guardians create the 'Third Army' to replace the Green Lantern Corps. Sinestro, who learned about this prophecy after touching the Book of the Black, to enlist Jordan's aid in stopping this scheme.

The Guardians use the First Lantern to create the Third Army from their own flesh and will.

The Guardians assign John Stewart to track down Mogo's remains, due to claims that they are moving and trying to reform it. The Guardians then promote Guy Gardner as the 'Sentinel Lantern' and entrust him with guarding a group of ambassadors traveling to a planet for a crucial conference, only to subsequently release Xar, Gardner's old enemy, from the Sciencells. They presume Xar will go after Gardner's family on Earth, serving as a distraction to stop Gardner from protecting the ambassadors. Later, the Guardians realize they cannot completely control the universe and need more members of the Third Army. They use more of the power of the First Lantern, without realizing that the First Lantern's prison is breaking.

When Volthoom is killed by Nekron, the Guardians are freed, only to be executed by Sinestro. Sinestro spares Ganthet and Sayd, but exiles them from Oa. The Guardians were resurrected following the DC Rebirth relaunch.

== Powers and abilities ==
Functionally immortal, the Guardians possess vast knowledge, flight, telepathy, psionic and cosmic powers manifested through green plasma energy drawn from the most stable color of the emotional spectrum, green (willpower). Although, since it has been said that they chose the most stable color of the spectrum, it is possible that the Guardians may have limited access to all colors. In Green Lantern: Rebirth, Kyle Rayner is recorded saying that Ganthet could crack a planet in half with a thought and have been shown able to stagger Superman-Prime and the Anti-Monitor. The Guardians display the power of time travel as they send a time-lost Rayner back to his present timeline.

== Appearance ==
The Guardians usually appear as diminutive, blue-skinned humanoids wearing red robes and white tabards bearing their crest, the Green Lantern symbol. The appearance of the male Guardians is modeled after former Prime Minister of Israel David Ben-Gurion.

After their rebirth, the females are typically bald and appear younger than males. Their male counterparts tend to have short white hair, and to be more wrinkled and aged looking. One long going inconsistency between artists has been the relative size of the Guardians' heads to their short bodies, most artists designing them with larger heads, whereas others have been shown to draw near enough human-like proportional heads. Another difference has been their ears, which have been seen to be human-like, and on other occasions, to be pointed and elf-like.

The Guardians' attire originally featured a long red robe with a stylized collar and their symbol emblazoned on the chest. Following their rebirth, this changed to them wearing a long red robe with a more scholarly collar, and a white tabard with their emblem on the chest area. They have also been shown by some artists to wear white undershirts, the sleeves of which can be seen sometimes under the robe's sleeves. Though their feet are not usually seen beneath their robes, they have been shown to wear red, pointed shoes.

== Guardians known by name ==
It has been said that "Guardians do not take names". When Krona invaded Oa in the War of the Green Lanterns story-arc, he revealed that all Oans have names, but have since forgotten them. Nonetheless, a few of their lot have been named in the stories. It was eventually revealed that the reason for the Guardians having forgotten their names was because they had removed their own emotions to defeat Volthoom.

- Appa Ali Apsa – A Guardian who was chosen to experience life on Earth. He later renounces his Guardian title, powers and immortality, and chooses to travel the universe. After Crisis on Infinite Earths, Apsa loses his mind and is killed by his former brethren. In post-Flashpoint continuity, Apsa was once a member of the Circle, a group of powerful beings.
- Broome Bon Barris
- Basilus
- Dawlakispokpok
- Dennap
- Ganthet – A leading Guardian and founding member of the Blue Lantern Corps.
- Herupa Hando Hu – His name is revealed by Krona.
- Lianna – A second-generation Guardian who was altered by Heartstone and raised by a Zamaron.
- Kontross
- Krona – A renegade Guardian and prominent enemy of the Green Lantern Corps.
- Pazu Pinder Pol
- Sayd – A leading Guardian and founding member of the Blue Lantern Corps.
- Scar – A Guardian who was scarred in battle with the Anti-Monitor. Scar later becomes dark, militaristic, and fascinated by the power of death. During Blackest Night, Scar gives Black Hand a black power ring, enabling him to found the Black Lantern Corps.
- Valorex
- Pale Bishop – A former Guardian of the Universe who turned his back on his kind when they started to use the Emotional Spectrum and instead founded The Paling, anti-emotion religious monks called Pale Vicars who turn people into emotionless followers. He is later killed by Sinestro.
- Rami
- Gurion – A Templar Guardian.
- Paalko – A Templar Guardian
- Reegal – A Templar Guardian. He was killed when the Guardians travelled to the Chamber of Shadows where they met Reegal who asked his kin whether they had saved the universe. However, the Guardians claimed that circumstances had changed and that they required the First Lantern. This went against the oath that the Hidden Ones had taken as they were well aware of the danger posed by the First Lantern if he was freed. Black Hand resurrected Reegal as an undead being so he could interrogate him about the location of the prison.
- Quaros – A Templar Guardian. He died in Green Lantern - New Guardians #34.
- Yekop – A Templar Guardian. Considered deceased by his brethren after his DNA was forcefully harvested by the Controllers, who changed him into one of them.
- Zalla – A Templar Guardian.
- Kada Sal – A Templar Guardian.
- Natos – A Templar Guardian. Considered deceased by his brethren after his DNA was forcefully harvested by the Controllers, who changed him into one of them.
- Nemosyni - A female Guardian of the Universe who made Jo Mullein's self-charging power ring. Sister of Koyos.
- Koyos - A male Guardian of the Universe and brother of Nemosyni.

=== Unofficial Guardians ===
- Master Builder – John Stewart, the only mortal Guardian of the Universe
- Sinestro – During Blackest Night, Sinestro briefly bonds with the Life Entity and claims the title of Guardian of the Universe.
- Sodam Yat – The last Guardian of the Universe in the 30th century.

== Artifacts and structures ==
Artefacts created by the Guardians of the Universe include:

- Power Gauntlet – A device created by Krona that serves as a prototype to the Green Lantern rings.
- Power Rings – Rings powered by willpower that harness Green Lantern energy to create energy constructs.
- The Great Heart – A device located beneath Maltus' surface that holds the Guardians' emotions.
- Green Lantern Power Battery – A reservoir of Green Lantern energy and the source of power for all Green Lanterns.
- A'Tmatentrym - A creature that can resist every weapon used against it and can only be defeated by those who refuse to fight it.
- Power Battery
- Manhunters – A group of androids that served as a prototypical version of the Green Lantern Corps.
- Energy Pistols
- Starheart
- Emerald Eye of Ekron – A construct created between the Manhunters and the power rings.
- The Foundry
- The Chamber of Shadows
- The Vault of Shadows
- The eye of Krona - A piece of glass made of Source material.

== Other versions ==
Alternative versions of the Guardians of the Universe appear in JLA: The Nail, Superman & Batman: Generations, Flashpoint, and Green Lantern: Earth One. In Earth One, the Guardians created the Manhunters as a replacement for the Green Lantern Corps, an inverse of normal continuity. The Manhunters went on to massacre the Guardians, with the last surviving Guardian founding the Yellow Lantern Corps. On Earth-Three, the Overlords of Oa are a malevolent counterpart of the Guardians.

== In other media ==
=== Television ===
- The Guardians of the Universe appear in The Superman/Aquaman Hour of Adventure episode "Evil is as Evil Does", voiced by Paul Frees.

The Guardians of the Universe as depicted in Superman: The Animated Series.

- The Guardians of the Universe appear in the Superman: The Animated Series episode "In Brightest Day...", voiced by Pat Musick and Peter Mark Richman.
- The Guardians of the Universe appear in the Justice League two-part episode "In Blackest Night", voiced by René Auberjonois.
- The Guardians of the Universe appear in the Justice League Unlimited episode "The Return", voiced by an uncredited Clancy Brown.
- Ganthet appears in the Duck Dodgers episode "The Green Loontern".
- The Guardians of the Universe appear in Batman: The Brave and the Bold, voiced by J.K. Simmons and Armin Shimerman.
- The Guardians of the Universe appear in Green Lantern: The Animated Series, with Ganthet voiced by Ian Abercrombie, Appa Ali Apsa by Brian George, Sayd by Susanne Blakeslee, and Scar by Sarah Douglas.
- The Guardians of the Universe appear in the DC Super Hero Girls episode "#TheGreenRoom".
- The Guardians of the Universe appear in Lanterns, with Lianna portrayed by Laura Linney in a human disguise.

=== Film ===
==== Live action ====
The Guardians of the Universe appear in Green Lantern (2011), consisting of Ganthet, Sayd, Appa Ali Apsa, Scar, Raugniad, Nguanzo, Pazu, Basil, Baris, Herupa, and Krona (before being consumed and transformed into Parallax).

==== Animation ====
- The Guardians of the Universe appear in Justice League: The New Frontier, voiced by Robin Atkin Downes.
- The Guardians of the Universe appear in Green Lantern: First Flight, with Ganthet voiced by Larry Drake, Appa Ali Apsa by William Schallert, and Ranakar by Malachi Throne.
- The Guardians of the Universe appear in Green Lantern: Emerald Knights, with Ganthet voiced by Michael Jackson, Appa Ali Apsa by Tony Amendola, and Ranakar by Steven Blum.
- The Guardians of the Universe appear in Justice League Dark: Apokolips War.

=== Video games ===
- The Guardians of the Universe appear in Mortal Kombat vs. DC Universe, with Ganthet voiced by Michael McConnohie and two unnamed Guardians voiced by Christopher Corey Smith and Joe J. Thomas.
- The Guardians of the Universe appear in Green Lantern: Rise of the Manhunters.
- The Guardians of the Universe make cameo appearances in Injustice: Gods Among Us.
- The Guardians of the Universe appear in Lego DC Super-Villains, with Ganthet voiced by Brian George.

=== Miscellaneous ===
The Guardians of the Universe appear in the Injustice: Gods Among Us prequel comic.
