= Atom (Ray Palmer) =

Fictional character, a superhero that appears in comic books published by DC Comics

The Atom
- Cover art by Gil Kane for the cover of Showcase #35 (November 1961)

Publication information
- Publisher: DC Comics
- First appearance: Showcase #34 (October 1961)
- Created by: Gardner Fox (writer); Gil Kane (artist)

In-story information
- Full name: Prof. Raymond Carson "Ray" Palmer
- Species: Human
- Place of origin: Ivy Town
- Team affiliations: Justice League; Teen Titans; Indigo Tribe; S.H.A.D.E. Legends
- Abilities: Size and mass alteration via belt; Genius-level intellect; Combat experience
Atom
- Showcase #34 (October 1961), debut of the Silver Age Atom. Cover art by Gil Kane.
Publication information
- Schedule: Bimonthly, monthly
- Format: (Atom, Atom and Hawkman, Power of the Atom): Ongoing series (Sword of the Atom): Limited series (Brightest Day: The Atom Special): One-shot
- Genre: Superhero
- Publication date: June 1962 – 2010
- No. of issues: (Atom): 38 (Atom and Hawkman): 7 (Sword of the Atom): 4 (Power of the Atom): 18 (Brightest Day: The Atom Special): 1
Creative team
- Written by: (Atom); Gardner Fox, Frank Robbins (Atom and Hawkman); Robert Kanigher, Gardner Fox, Denny O'Neil (Sword of the Atom); Jan Strnad (Power of the Atom); Roger Stern, Tom Peyer (Brightest Day: The Atom Special); Jeff Lemire
- Penciller(s): (Atom); Gil Kane, Mike Sekowsky (Atom and Hawkman); Murphy Anderson, Dick Dillin (Sword of the Atom); Gil Kane (Power of the Atom); Dwayne Turner, Graham Nolan (Brightest Day: The Atom Special); Mahmud A. Asrar
- Inker(s): (Atom); Murphy Anderson, Sid Greene (Brightest Day: The Atom Special); John Dell III
- Letterer(s): (Brightest Day: The Atom Special); Sal Cipriano
- Colorist(s): (Brightest Day: The Atom Special); Pete Pantazis

Professor Raymond Carson "Ray" Palmer, better known as the Atom, is a superhero appearing in American comic books published by DC Comics. The character was created by writer Gardner Fox and penciler Gil Kane. The Atom was one of the first superheroes of the Silver Age of Comic Books and debuted in Showcase #34 (October 1961).

The Atom has been played in various television series by Alfie Wise and John Kassir. Brandon Routh portrays the character in series set in the Arrowverse, beginning in Arrow.

== Publication history ==
The Atom debuted in Showcase #34 (cover-dated Oct. 1961) from the DC Comics precursor, National Comics. Early comics-fandom pioneer Jerry Bails wrote to the National Comics editor Julius Schwartz in December 1960 outlining an updated version of Al Pratt, the company's 1940s Golden Age Atom. Bails and future Marvel Comics editor-in-chief Roy Thomas collaborated on a suggested version that incorporated elements of a Golden Age hero, Quality Comics' Doll Man. Eventual Atom writer Gardner Fox wrote Bails on January 1, 1961, stating that Schwartz passed along Bails' letter to him.

...so that I might write and let you know that okay okay okay (this is hush-hush) an Atom book may get under way [sic] in the next month or so. I am trying to cook up some "new" super-powers for him in.... Your own suggestions are excellent and most especially the one about the atomic compression of his body, which is to be a feature of the "new" Atom. I have seen art samples of how he will look. ... [A]t the present moment the intent is to make him a college student rather than the scientific experimenter you have in mind. This is all talk, mind you — nothing definite.

Schwartz wrote Bails on January 6 saying he had already been planning a new version of the Atom, in the vein of National's reimagined Golden Age superheroes the Flash and Green Lantern, and had already asked artist Gil Kane to sketch designs. Kane, unaware of Bails' suggestions, said he did "a series of drawings" on large illustration boards, including a depiction of the new Atom riding a German Shepherd dog and another of a pistol firing at the Atom, who wore the costume he eventually would in his comic debut but without a belt. Kane, who lived in Jericho, New York, on Long Island, at the time, drove to the nearby Hicksville home of DC production person Tom Nicolosi, who colored the drawings using St. Martin's dyes. Schwartz, after seeing the drawings, had the belt added, a detail Kane said he disliked since "it broke up the costume lines." Schwartz said he had not wanted to reuse the Golden Age Atom, Al Pratt, and had read about dwarf stars and thought a fragment of one could power the new hero's miniaturization. He added that he and Fox together plotted the early stories of this new Silver Age Atom. Fox said in 1979, "I doubt that any feedback from Bails or Thomas had very much of an influence, though always kept their ideas in the back of our minds."

His alter ego, Ray Palmer, is an homage to science-fiction magazine editor Raymond A. Palmer.

== Fictional character biography ==
=== Silver Age ===
Raymond Carson "Ray" Palmer, is a physicist and professor at Ivy University in the fictional city of Ivy Town, somewhere in New England, specializing in matter compression as a means to fight overpopulation, famine and other world problems. Using a mass of white dwarf star matter he finds after it lands on Earth, Palmer fashions a lens that enables him to shrink any object to any degree he wishes. Compression destabilizes an object's molecular structure, however, causing it to explode.

Ray Palmer with his girlfriend and later wife, Jean Loring. Art by Gil Kane and Murphy Anderson from Showcase #34 (October 1961).

During a spelunking expedition, Palmer and his students, along with his girlfriend, lawyer Jean Loring, find themselves trapped in a cave. In desperation, Palmer secretly uses the lens he has carried with him to shrink himself to be able to climb through a small opening in the fallen rocks sealing the cave, knowing he will likely explode. Using a diamond engagement ring, Palmer enlarges the hole sufficiently and descends to the floor to try to alert the others of the escape route before dying. However, upon entering the lens' beam, he finds himself returned to normal size and without danger of exploding. As the lens is covered with cave moisture, Palmer believes this has altered the beam to allow this strange effect. When subsequent experiments still result in objects exploding, Palmer concludes some unknown force in his own body allows him to safely size-shift. He decides to use this effect to become a superhero. A retcon in Brightest Day: The Atom Special (July 2010) removes the influence of his exotic physical makeup, tying his survival instead to the discovery of a compression matrix, a fabric able to spread the effects of the ray on the entire body, stabilizing it. The prototype matrix later became his costume.

Palmer creates a belt tool to control his miniaturization to subatomic size with an emergency backup mechanism in his gloves, and develops a costume that he can wear at most times that only becomes visible when he shrinks significantly. In addition, he develops equipment that allows him to decrease his weight in addition to his size, allowing him to glide on air currents on a low setting, while a high setting allows him to handle or strike objects with the equivalent strength of his normal size and build. A favorite travel method is to call some location on the telephone and when the phone is answered, Palmer can shrink enough to travel through the phone lines in seconds to emerge out the answering phone.

He carries out the bulk of his early superheroic adventures in Ivy Town, where he often helps his girlfriend, Jean Loring, win her cases. Much later, he gains the innate equivalent powers within his own body.

Palmer has fought against several alien and supernatural threats, as well as having his own rogues gallery, including Chronos, the Bug-Eyed Bandit, the Floronic Man, and the Bat-Knights of Elvaran. He also had several time travel adventures by means of Professor Alpheus V. Hyatt's Time Pool. The Atom is a member of several incarnations of the Justice League, and the team is gracious enough to supply a special chair scaled to his default size which can elevate to whatever height needed so he can easily partake in team meetings without having to go out of costume. There, he meets Hawkman (Katar Hol pre-Hawkworld, Carter Hall post-Hawkworld), one of his closest friends in the superhero community. Neither character achieved major popularity, and even in their heyday were mostly supporting characters, often with Palmer as a specialist in size alteration who was needed to access extremely confined areas only he could access. Hawkman would manufacture prosthetic wings for a myna Ray saved, taking on the name Major Mynah and became the Atom's partner and steed.

=== Sword of the Atom, Power of the Atom, and Teen Titans ===
Sword of the Atom #1 (September 1983). Cover art by Gil Kane.

The Atom had one short-lived miniseries and three subsequent specials, all titled Sword of the Atom, in which Palmer abandons civilization after divorcing his wife Jean, who had an affair with fellow lawyer Paul Hoben, and becomes the hero of a tribe of six-inch (152 mm) -tall yellow-skinned humanoid aliens called Morlaidhans in the jungles of South America. He also becomes consort to their princess, Laethwyn. Palmer bequeathes his size-changing belt and role as Ivy Town's protector to Jean's new husband, Hoben. During this time, Palmer's friend Norman Brawler pens the book The Atom's Farewell, in which he reveals Palmer's identity as the Atom.

Eventually the colony is destroyed, despite Palmer's attempt to save it, by a group associated with the US Government acting as loggers. Palmer is forced to escape via the telephone to North America. In the attempt, he fails to anticipate that the connection will involve satellite relay and the unexpectedly arduous trip causes him to remain at approximately three feet high and without his costume's size changing equipment.

With the help of a friend, Ray creates a new costume from the material of the white dwarf star. This time, instead of a belt, Palmer uses an encephalotronic grid in the costume's headpiece to control the costume. The grid is keyed to his unique brainwaves. This enables him to transfer his mass into an unknown dimension which allows him to alter his size and weight just by thinking about it. He can even make the new costume appear or disappear with a thought by shifting most of its atoms to or from the other dimension. This allows him to be in costume while at full height or to shrink without having to have his costume appear. He can even increase his weight while remaining six inches (152 mm) tall or reduce his weight while remaining at full size. Ray often does this and is then light enough to ride wind currents, where he actually appears to be flying to a limited degree. Palmer also develops a mental link with the white dwarf matter to which he has been regularly exposed. Most of the mass lies within another dimension. Ray can draw upon that mass and hit with a super-concussive force. He has been shown to punch through concrete walls, crush an exam table and break the axle of a car that is moving at high speed.

Power of the Atom #1 (June 1988), depicting the Atom in his new costume. Art by K.S. Wilson, Dwayne Turner

Palmer would learn of those behind the genocide of the Morlaidhans, namely five CIA operatives, part of a group called the Cabal. In a mission called Operation: Fireball, the tiny aliens were murdered in hopes Ray would return as the Atom and become a tool for the Cabal (as Ray worked for the CIA in his earlier years). Instead, Palmer shrank the five agents to six-inch height and the CIA would employ them as a group called Micro/Squad. The Atom would take on new enemies during this period, such as Humbug, a sentient robot in control of an army of duplicates of itself, and Strobe, a technological armor-clad crook. Micro/Squad would also return, attempting to murder Palmer for what he did to them. Instead, teammate Ginsburg dies in the explosion they set and Ray approaches Adam Cray about becoming the new Atom to bring the remaining Micro/Squad into the open. Cray agrees, steals Paul Hoben's size-changing belt, and joins the Suicide Squad. The plan works as the villains emerge and Palmer takes the place of operative Sting; but their leader, Blacksnake, kills Cray and takes the belt for himself, returning to normal height. Blacksnake murders the remaining members of his crew as Ray arrives, revealing himself, posing as Sting, and battles him. After Blacksnake is defeated, the Cabal employs Task Force X II to murder him to protect their secrets.

Later, during the events of Zero Hour, Palmer is rejuvenated to a teenage state and develops the ability to grow in height in addition to his previous abilities, all of which he was capable of controlling innately without using his white dwarf star-based equipment. He becomes field leader of a new group of Teen Titans, composed of hybrids of human beings and the H'San Natall, after a chance meeting with Isaiah Crockett on his first day attending Ivy University. As a former member of the Justice League, Palmer viewed his affiliation with the Teen Titans as a step backward. The group primarily battled the Veil, an anti-alien organization that employed Deathstroke and Dark Nemesis and was led by Pylon, a H'San Natall. They would also face Jugular (hired by the H'San Natall) and Loren Jupiter's son Jarrod, aka Haze. The Atom's new growth powers were instrumental in the battle against Sekhmet of the Millennium Giants. Ray subsequently regains his original age and memories and loses his new powers after he begins to rapidly age and Waverider has to use DNA taken prior to his rejuvenation to restore him to his original state. Palmer returns to his teaching job at Ivy University, but also becomes an associate and alternate member of the JLA. With his exit from the Teen Titans, the group disbands. One notable student under Palmer was Ronnie Raymond, who, without the assistance of Martin Stein, found difficulty in fully employing his abilities as Firestorm.

=== Identity Crisis and Countdown ===
In the 2004-05 limited series Identity Crisis, Jean Loring kills Sue Dibny, the wife of the Elongated Man. After stealing some of the Atom's shrinking technology and his costume, she kills Sue in a misguided attempt to win Palmer back. She also arranges a hit on Tim Drake's father Jack Drake, which is carried out by Captain Boomerang (Digger Harkness). The intent is for Jack to kill some random attacker, but both manage to kill each other. After committing her to Arkham Asylum, Palmer shrinks himself to microscopic size and disappears.

Palmer eventually meets up with his old friend Carter Hall after microscopically traveling through phone lines. He warns Hall of the consequences of mindwiping Batman and of harassing criminals over a crime that is perpetrated by Jean, one of their own. Palmer explains he needs time away, and shrinks himself again after Hall agrees to keep the meeting secret.

His legacy lived on, however. Ryan Choi, a student of physics in Hong Kong who corresponded with Ray Palmer via mail in the past, found a copy of his costume and shrinking device to become the current Atom. Around this same time, an unnamed teenager with powers similar to Palmer joins the Teen Titans under the name Molecule. After a brief tenure with the team, he is later killed during a confrontation with the Terror Titans.

During the missing year, Palmer's technology is employed by Supernova to shrink and grow in size to enter and exit the bottle city of Kandor.

DC Comics would not reveal Palmer's whereabouts since his disappearance at the end of Identity Crisis. However, Palmer returned to play a very important role in the Countdown limited series. A Monitor asks the Source Wall what is the solution to "the great disaster," it answers "Ray Palmer". Subsequently, Kyle Rayner, Donna Troy and Jason Todd scour the multiverse for the former Atom, who may hold the key to saving reality from a crisis of unparalleled proportions.

In their travels, the quartet has found people marked with the Atom's familiar symbol. The group tracks Palmer to Earth-51, where he assumes the life of its native Palmer after his life is cut short during his studies of the multiverse and discovery of the looming Crisis. Meeting the Jean of Earth-51 and the Justice League again for the first time, Palmer is found on a world where the heroes have been able to eradicate supercrime and create a utopian Earth (later revealed to have been the result of this reality's Batman murdering all of this world's super-criminals after the Joker killed Jason Todd). However, once Kyle, Donna, Jason and Bob the Monitor are able to track him down, Bob attempts to kill Palmer; with the Challengers' help, Palmer escapes and reveals to the Challengers that it was the Ray Palmer of Earth-51 who was meant to stop the Great Disaster and that he had been trying to carry on his work, to no avail.

When the Challengers return to their own Earth, Jimmy Olsen is kidnapped by Mary Marvel, who has been corrupted by Darkseid. Palmer hitches a ride from within Jimmy. When Darkseid takes control of Jimmy's powers, Palmer locates and shuts down the control sphere inside Jimmy's brain, but is then swarmed by Apokoliptian antibodies. While escaping this onslaught, Palmer discovers the "battery" containing the New God spirit energies. Palmer removes it from Jimmy's head and shatters it, releasing the energy.

Palmer later (after much cajoling) joins Donna, Kyle, and Forager in their new mission as border guards to the multiverse, realizing that there is nothing left for him on Earth. However, Palmer returns home to New Earth one more time, upon realizing that his old nemesis Chronos had taken his identity to mislead a young pretender to his identity, Ryan Choi. After helping his successor to once again save Ivy Town, he returns to the multiverse with a new sense of fulfillment, leaving his town in the hands of a new, capable hero.

During the Final Crisis, Palmer returns to New Earth and works with Choi again to aid in the efforts to evacuate the last free humans.

In the Justice League: Cry for Justice mini-series, Palmer joins Hal Jordan's Justice League.

=== Blackest Night ===
On the night of the superhero's memorial day, Palmer asks Hawkman to visit Jean's grave to be honored as a fallen member of the community, but Hawkman refuses because of what she did in Identity Crisis. Palmer is later shown speaking to Hawkman again, over the phone (unaware that his friend has been killed and reanimated as a Black Lantern). Atom is then invited to visit undead Hawkman to discuss his heartache over his wife. Palmer is later revealed to have shrunk into Hawkman's ring, escaping certain death. Joining the battle between Hal Jordan, Barry Allen, and the Black Lanterns, Palmer is set upon by Black Lanterns Ralph and Sue Dibny, who use his guilt over Jean's actions to try to feed on his compassion-filled heart. Palmer is saved from death by the Indigo Tribe, who combine their light with Hal's to destroy the Dibnys and their rings. During the crisis, Palmer was able to deduce with the heroes that the black rings are simulations taking the identities of the deceased and needing to feed. The Indigo Tribe take the heroes to the Hall of Justice, unceremoniously taking Hal Jordan and abandoning the rest when the Black Lanterns renew their attack.

Palmer helps the heroes escape via a phone line, and then brings them to the JSA, who were also being attacked by Black Lanterns. During the crisis, Palmer meets Damage, son of Al Pratt, the first Atom. The two heroes briefly acquainted during the battle, and begin to develop a friendship. Palmer stopped the Black Lantern Pratt from killing Damage, but was unable to keep the reanimated Jean from finishing the job. Palmer made a futile attempt to stop one of the black rings from turning Damage's corpse into an undead before Jean used his own technology to shrink him, Mera, and herself into Damage's ring. As Palmer and Mera battle Jean inside the black ring, Jean reveals Nekron's plan along showing what is happening at Coast City, as deceased residents and revived heroes arise as Black Lanterns under the demon lord's commands. Deadman witnesses their battle and plans to rescue Palmer and Mera from Jean. Deadman saves Palmer and Mera by briefly possessing Jean, allowing them to escape and join the heroes against Nekron and his army. During the battle, Palmer is chosen as a deputy officer of the Indigo Tribe to be more effective against Nekron's forces. Although the Indigo Tribe eschews formal uniforms for tribal patterns over simple garments, Ray Palmer's costume is turned into a close approximation of the tattered Sword of the Atom clothing he had used in the past.

Palmer's past is rehashed, showing that he never quite got over Jean, even during the days of Sword of the Atom. Indigo-1 claims that she can teleport the armies of each Lantern Corps onto Earth, if given time to meditate. The responsibility falls to Palmer to protect her while she does so. Before she enters her trance, she reveals to Palmer that the indigo staff and his overwhelming compassion allows him to mimic the other powers of the Lantern Corps; she demonstrates this by temporarily becoming a Red Lantern and vomiting corrosive blood all over an attacking company of Black Lanterns. She then enters her trance, while Palmer fights off Black Lanterns Hawkman and Hawkgirl by temporarily becoming an Orange Lantern, loudly proclaiming "I want my friends back!" He then summons energy duplicates of Khufu and Chay-Ara to help him fight off his and Indigo-1's attackers. He is briefly successful. But then Jean shows up to torment him, and she leaps into Indigo-1's ring. Palmer follows her. He ends up reliving Sue Dibny's death, and is then attacked by various Black Lantern Morlaidhans, the minuscule race he befriended during Sword of the Atom. He fights them off and, summoning the powers of a Green Lantern, destroys Jean. Indigo-1 manages to summon the various armies and thanks Palmer for his help. He tells her to keep his involvement in the deployment of the troops a secret, and asks that she help him find a way to legitimately resurrect Hawkman and Hawkgirl. In the final battle, Palmer gets his wish when Hawkman and Hawkgirl are resurrected by the Life Entity.

=== Brightest Day and Adventure Comics co-feature ===
In July 2010 Ray Palmer had a Brightest Day one-shot that led to a co-feature in Adventure Comics. Written by Jeff Lemire with art by Mahmud Asrar, the co-feature focused on Ray Palmer's early life. For a brief three-issue tenure, Palmer was part of writer James Robinson's new Justice League line-up, but resigned to help his friend Martin Stein with some sort of project. At the start of the Brightest Day event, Ray and Stein are seen at the funeral of Gehenna. When Jason Rusch gets into a confrontation with Ronnie Raymond over Gehenna's death, Ray steps in and tries to stop it. Ray manages to separate Jason and Ronnie from Black Lantern constructs.

Afterward, Ray discovered his father was attacked and the suspect was his own uncle David. With Ray's father in the hospital, Ray discovers his father had a stroke and his investigation of technology had been stolen. He seeks out Oracle to find the Calculator, Oracle manages to trace a data line, and Ray enters through the internet where he then encounters the Calculator and interrogates him to find out the dealers are. However, Calculator creates a room with no oxygen to make Atom's heartrate slower and he attempts to kill the Atom. Ray manages to grab Calculator and shrinks to return to Oracle's base. While Ray is in remission, he threatens Calculator who tells him that something called the Colony has manipulated Ray. Later, Prof. Hyatt was attacked by the Colony while looking for white dwarf matter. When Ray arrives, he goes to rescue Prof. Hyatt. During the fight, the Colony dies by incineration from the white dwarf matter. Ray calls Oracle to trace the phone line, and while he arrives at the Colony's base he is confronted by the Colony squad.

After failing to avoid detection, he is confronted by Uncle David and with his help, pulls him away from the Colony heading towards the teleporter. Once safe, David tells Ray about the Colony. David also tells Ray that he could not leave and could not work on the projects on his own, he shows Ray how to travel using the astrology orb called the ant farm to see a mini-planet of microscopic nature. But, the Colony followed them to David's hideout and travels to the ant farm Ray then engages them in an epic battle. After the battle the Colony died from incineration as it did before but, Ray managed to save him using his stable white dwarf matter. Ray demanded to know what they desired and the Colony tells him the same thing, and they transport the ant farm to the Colony's base. He destroys Ray's belt buckle's white dwarf matter and kills himself. Since they cannot return, Ray follows David with a backup plan when suddenly Ray is approached by robotic insects. David explains that the robotic insects are caretakers. They manage to fix the belt buckle and he returns to normal size when in Colony's base. Failing to escape, Ray is forced by the scientist to bring the white dwarf matter. He shows the monitor renderings where Colony is standing in front of the hospital where is father his and he is going to kill him.

When Ray refused, Hawkman prevents Colony from attacking Ray's father. Ray receives a call from Oracle to trace the monitor renderings, but Hawkman is being attacked by the Colony squad that miniaturize into Hawkman's body. Ray chooses to save Hawkman to leave the Colony's base while the other Colony escapes and kidnaps Ray's father. Ray rescues Hawkman by leaping into a body of the Colony attackers. When Hawkman is recovering, the Colony leaves their message to bring the white dwarf meteor and warned him no tricks, and to bring the meteor to save his family. While Ray traded the meteor to Colony before the Colony leaves, they exchange it for Ray's family that is in the ant farm. Ray travels into the ant farm and discovers that they planted a nuclear bomb on a vest strapped to David. Ray then manages to save his father and David and shrinks the bomb before it had a chance to detonate. While Ray's father is recovering, Ray reveals to David that he planted the white dwarf meteor into a nano-liquid to make the Colony's headquarters shrink. Ray, David, and Hawkman arrive at the location of the Colony's headquarters to attack their base. After the Colony was defeated however, David tells him there are more Colonies in the area. Later, Ray returns his father home. Ray forgives his father and apologizes for giving him a rough life before he overhears a firefighter rescue service, as he is a capable hero once more.

During this same period, Ray begins an investigation into the disappearance of Ryan, whom unbeknownst to the superhero community, had been murdered by Deathstroke. Ray comforts Ryan's girlfriend Amanda, and muses Ryan may be hiding out like Ray did after the events of Identity Crisis. While he shrinks himself to investigate he discovers microbiology blood. He arrives at the Hall of Justice to tell the League members that Ryan is missing. The League starts to help Ray's investigation to find Ryan's whereabouts. He discovers Ryan's DNA cell is not a match. The DNA cell came to someone else. Later, Ray discovers evidence that Dwarfstar had a hand in Ryan's death, and vows to find him and make him pay. Ray eventually finds Dwarfstar in a hospital, where he is recovering from the severe injuries he sustained from his torture at the hands of Giganta (Ryan's ex-girlfriend). Believing it may lead to a lighter sentence, Dwarfstar confesses to hiring Deathstroke to kill Ryan. Armed with this knowledge, Ray leaves to inform the Justice League. Later, he asked Batman (Dick Grayson) to get revenge on Deathstroke for murdering Ryan. Ray and the Justice League arrive to attempt to arrest Deathstroke and the Titans. The Justice League battle against the Titans in Khandaq, where Ray seriously injures Deathstroke for killing his friend. The battle is stopped by Isis, who forces the Justice League to flee to avoid restarting World War III. After failing, Ray begins writing the eulogy for Ryan's funeral, and is comforted by Superman. In the final issue, Ray meets Ryan's friends and family, and gives the speech at his protégé's funeral.

=== Convergence ===
In the Convergence crossover, when the alternate Brainiac miniaturized the universe of the New Earth, Ray Palmer, who had been in a mental state with his powers to increase size affected since imprisoned in the dome, sends out a broadcast message that he will pursue Deathstroke for Ryan Choi's murder. Ray then engages Deathstroke in an epic battle, but Ray is being pulled by the mysterious voice of Telos to fight opposite Angor universe's Barracuda. While Ray battles Barracuda, Ryan Choi suddenly appears and to be alive, and confronts him. Ryan explains that his death and consciousness had survived in the universe where the Atoms' masses are shifted to whenever they change size. Ryan then returns to the realm of the living after appropriating Ray's hand that Barracuda severed during their battle, to create a new body for him after they defeat Barracuda. Ray is hospitalized after losing his hand, and Deathstroke infiltrates the hospital and attempts to kill him, but Ryan interferes as they work together to defeat Deathstroke and restored Ray's hand.

=== The New 52 ===
In September 2011, The New 52 rebooted DC's continuity. In this new timeline, Ray appears in Frankenstein: Agent of S.H.A.D.E. as S.H.A.D.E.'s science advisor, although he appears to have retained his abilities. His shrinking technology enables S.H.A.D.E. agents to enter and leave their microscopic headquarters, the Ant Farm. He later uses his size-shifting abilities to assist Superman in visiting Kandor, during which he wears a protective suit similar to the Atom costume. At the end of this adventure he expresses an interest in becoming a superhero as the Atom. He subsequently assists Superman in costume during Superman's fight with Vandal Savage.

=== DC Rebirth ===
Subsequently, in the DC Rebirth reboot, on Earth-0, Ray Palmer is, by day, a professor at an Ivy League college and, by night, the experienced crime fighter The Atom. He reveals his secret identity to his friend and apprentice Ryan Choi, and enlists him for tech support during his adventures. After many adventures together, Ray disappears and Ryan is scolded when Ray cancels classes for the fifth day in a row. When Ryan goes to get Ray from his workshop where he has seemingly been confined for a week, he instead finds a video recording from Ray. In it he reveals he discovered a universe beyond the subatomic, a so-called Microverse while investigating a disruption in space and time, and within he found something that posed an existential threat to their universe. He asks Ryan, the only other person who knows how to use the Atom's technology and whom Ray trusts, to go into it, rescue him, and finish his work. Ray informs Ryan that upon arrival he will also meet with someone who he himself has encountered. He tries to warn Ryan about something, but the footage cuts out abruptly before he can finish. When Batman begins recruiting for his new Justice League of America, he chooses Ray as one of the members of the new league, however when he enters Ray's office he finds Ryan instead. Ryan explains to Batman about Ray's situation so he takes Ryan as Ray's successor.

Carter Hall, during his ongoing quest to reveal the mysteries of his past lives, is transported to the Microverse, where Ray has relocated. Together they recover a starship located on the living planet Moz-Ga which belonged to several of Hall's past lives.

In the 2025 series Justice League: The Atom Project, Ray and Ryan work to reverse the aftermath of Absolute Power, in which many heroes had their powers stolen by the Amazo army. When the Amazos were destroyed, most of the heroes regained their powers, but some were unable to regain their powers, which were transferred to other heroes or civilians.

== Powers and abilities ==
Atom possesses the power to alter his size down to the subatomic level while retaining his natural strength level. This is accomplished by using the remnants of a white-dwarf star made into a belt buckle worn with his costume. Originally, he had to manipulate his abilities via the belt, and later with hand movements, before eventually syncing directly with his brain via mental commands. The Atom is one of the few heroes in the DC Universe that has 100% control over his body on the molecular level (Plastic Man being another), thus making him exponentially more powerful than he is often portrayed; he is limited only by his application of his powers. Some of the applications he has demonstrated include reducing his mass to glide through the air and increasing his mass to punch through concrete. He also demonstrated the ability to make his costume appear and disappear at will by shifting its atoms between this dimension and another.

During Countdown to Final Crisis, Palmer learned he could shrink down beyond the subatomic scale to traverse the multiverse by slipping below the quantum layer beneath reality. He has been shown to be able to ride phone lines to his destination by dialing a number and traveling through the handset (his signature use of his power), and recently shrinking small enough to travel on photon signals through fiber optic cable.

Some of The Atom's more impressive feats include shrinking into Superman's atomic structure and manually compile his protonic minutia to generate Kryptonite radiation and defusing Black Lantern Al Pratt's Atomic Punch and resizing within him, ripping his body apart in the process.

Following the events of Zero Hour, the Atom gained the ability to also grow in size and internalizes his other abilities without the use of his white dwarf star-based apparatus. However, when returned to his natural age, these abilities were lost.

As a member of the Indigo Tribe, Ray possessed an indigo power ring powered by compassion, which provided him with flight, energy projection, and a protective force field. He also utilized a staff capable of duplicating the abilities of other wielders of the Emotional spectrum within range.

He has also shown the ability to allow others to shrink down with him if the situation requires it, such as when he shrank himself, Superman, Flash, Green Lantern, Wonder Woman and Plastic Man to repair the links between seven shattered subatomic particles, or shrinking Steel, Supergirl and Superboy to directly treat a kryptonite tumor in Superman's body. However, this ability is relatively limited; initially anyone other than himself who was shrunk would explode after two minutes if not returned to their normal size, although by the time he sent Superman's allies into the Man of Steel, he was able to extend this time to around an hour.

Palmer is exceptionally intelligent. He has a IQ of 140 and prior to acquiring his abilities, he had four PhDs under his belt. He is a world authority on physics, with other superheroes often consulting him for assistance with physics-related projects.

Although physics is his primary forte, he is proficient in various other scientific disciplines. He has proven to be a master of engineering, as he was able to design and build the A.T.O.M. He has also developed several other technologically sophisticated gadgets during his tenure as the CEO of Palmer Tech such as surgical nanobots, dispersal units, smartwatches, etc. He is an adept chemist as well, as he was able to analyze and modify Eobard Thawne's biomolecular enhancer to have lasting and more stable effects while in World War II, despite the formula initially being made from 22nd-century technology.

Additionally, he is in excellent physical condition, engaging in frequent exercise and workouts. He has a high level of experience with-hand-to-hand combat, having received training from various different Justice League members, namely Batman. Boxing and judo are his preferred fighting styles. He has also displayed proficiency in swordsmanship and acrobatics.

== Other versions ==
- An alternate universe version of Ray Palmer appears in The Dark Knight Strikes Again. This version was imprisoned by Lex Luthor for several years until being rescued by Catgirl. He later helps reclaim Kandor before being killed by a Kryptonian cult leader while attempting to enlarge it.
- An alternate universe version of Ray Palmer appears in League of Justice. This version is a wizard also known as Atomus.
- An alternate universe version of Ray Palmer appears in JLA: Age of Wonder.
- An alternate universe version of Ray Palmer appears in JLA: Rock of Ages. This version is a member of the Justice League in an alternate future where Darkseid has taken control of Earth. He later sacrifices himself to kill Darkseid by entering his brain and bombarding it with radiation.
- Ray Palmer / Atom appears in JLA/Avengers.
- An alternate universe version of Ray Palmer appears in DC: The New Frontier.
- An alternate universe version of Ray Palmer appears in JLA: The Nail.
- Several alternate universe versions of Ray Palmer appear in Countdown to Final Crisis: one from Earth-6 who developed solar powers and became the Ray; an unnamed gender-flipped version from Earth-11; one from Earth-30; and one from Earth-51 who never gained superpowers but remained an ally of the Justice League.
- An alternate universe version of Ray Palmer appears in Flashpoint. This version is a corrections officer in Doom Prison before being killed by Heat Wave during a prison break.

== In other media ==
=== Television ===
- Ray Palmer / Atom appears in The Superman/Aquaman Hour of Adventure, voiced by Pat Harrington Jr.
- Ray Palmer / Atom appears in Super Friends, voiced by Wally Burr.
- Ray Palmer / Atom appears in the Legends of the Superheroes special "The Roast", portrayed by Alfie Wise. This version is engaged to marry Giganta.
- Ray Palmer / Atom appears in Justice League of America, portrayed by John Kassir.
- Ray Palmer / Atom appears in Justice League Unlimited, voiced by John C. McGinley. This version is a member of the Justice League.
- Ray Palmer / Atom appears in the Batman: The Brave and the Bold episode "Sword of the Atom!", voiced by Peter Scolari. This version was the original Atom and mentored Ryan Choi before eventually retiring to the Amazon rainforest, where he entered a relationship with Princess Laethwyn of the Morlaidhans.
- Ray Palmer / Atom appears in Young Justice, voiced by Jason Marsden. This version is a member of the Justice League who is assisted by Bumblebee.
- Ray Palmer / Atom appears in the DC Nation Shorts segment "Sword of the Atom", voiced again by Jason Marsden.
- Ray Palmer / Atom appears in Justice League Action, voiced by Jerry O'Connell.
- Ray Palmer / Atom appears in the Teen Titans Go! episode "Strength of a Grown Man", voiced by Patton Oswalt.
- Ray Palmer / Atom appears in the Batwheels episode "Bite-Sized Buff", voiced by Dee Bradley Baker.

=== Arrowverse ===
Brandon Routh as Ray Palmer/The Atom

Ray Palmer / Atom appears in media set in the Arrowverse, portrayed by Brandon Routh. This version has an I.Q. of 140 and four PhDs, is the CEO of Palmer Technologies (formerly Queen Consolidated), and was engaged to Anna Loring before she was killed by Deathstroke's men. Additionally, his suit was originally designed as the combat exosuit OMAC. Palmer first appears as a recurring character in the live-action TV series Arrow before making guest appearances in the live-action spin-off The Flash and the animated CW Seed series Vixen, as well as being a main character in the live-action spin-off Legends of Tomorrow.

=== Film ===
- Ray Palmer appears in Justice League: The New Frontier, voiced by an uncredited Corey Burton.
- An alternate universe version of Ray Palmer appears in Justice League: Gods and Monsters, voiced by Dee Bradley Baker. This version was a member of Lex Luthor's "Project Fair Play", a weapons program contingency meant to destroy their version of the Justice League if necessary, before Palmer is killed by a Metal Man designed by Will Magnus to frame Wonder Woman.
- Ray Palmer / Atom appears in Teen Titans Go! To the Movies, voiced again by Patton Oswalt.
- Ray Palmer / Atom appears in Justice League: Crisis on Infinite Earths.

=== Video games ===
- Ray Palmer appears in Injustice: Gods Among Us as a non-playable character in the Insurgency headquarters stage and a playable character in the Joker's S.T.A.R. Labs minigames.
- Ray Palmer appears as a playable character in Lego Batman 3: Beyond Gotham, voiced by Troy Baker.
- The Arrowverse incarnation of Ray Palmer / Atom appears as a playable character in the "DC TV Super-Heroes" DLC of Lego DC Super-Villains, voiced by Brandon Routh.
- Ray Palmer / Atom appears in Scribblenauts Unmasked: A DC Comics Adventure.

=== Miscellaneous ===
- Ray Palmer / Atom appears in Justice League Adventures.
- Ray Palmer / Atom appears in the Justice League Unlimited tie-in comic.
- Jessica Palmer appears in Smallville Season 11 as an associate of Superman, among others.
- Ray Palmer / Atom appears in the Injustice: Gods Among Us prequel comic.
- Ray Palmer / Atom appears in the Injustice 2 prequel comic as a member of Batman's Insurgency working to repair the damage caused by the Regime.

== Collected editions ==
Title	Material collected	Year	ISBN
The Atom Archives Vol. 1	Showcase #34-36; The Atom #1-5	2001	1563897172
The Atom Archives Vol. 2	The Atom #6-13	2003	1401200141
Showcase Presents The Atom Vol. 1	Showcase #34-36; The Atom #1-17	2007	9781401213633
Showcase Presents The Atom Vol. 2	The Atom #18-38	2008	9781401218485
Sword of the Atom	Sword of the Atom #1-4, Sword of the Atom Special #1	2007	9781401215538

== Reception ==
This version of Atom was ranked as the 144th Greatest Comic Book Character of All Time by Wizard magazine. IGN also ranked the Atom as the 64th Greatest Comic Book Hero of All Time stating; "Of all the superheroes out here, Dr. Ray Palmer might be one of the most brilliant tortured souls imaginable."

== See also ==
- Ant-Man
