= Jean Loring =

- Jean Loring, as she appeared in Sword of the Atom #1 (September 1983); Art by Gil Kane.

Publication information
- Publisher: DC Comics
- First appearance: Showcase #34 (October 1961)
- Created by: Gardner Fox; Gil Kane

In-story information
- Alter ego: Jean Loring
- Team affiliations: Black Lantern Corps
- Supporting character of: Atom (Ray Palmer)
- Notable aliases: Eclipso

Jean Loring is a character appearing in comic books published by DC Comics, formerly associated with the Atom, for whom she was a supporting character and primary love interest. She first appeared in Showcase #34 (October 1961), created by writer Gardner Fox and artist Gil Kane. The character appears continually in minor roles until the 2004 storyline Identity Crisis, where she suffers a mental breakdown and orchestrates the deaths of Sue Dibny and Jack Drake. This would later lead her to assume the mantle of the supervillain Eclipso.

Jean Loring appears as a recurring character on the CW Arrowverse television series Arrow, portrayed by Teryl Rothery.

== Fictional character biography ==
=== Lawyer and wife ===
Jean Loring with Ray Palmer. Art by Gil Kane.

Jean Loring's career as an attorney in Ivy Town began at almost the same time that her boyfriend, Ray Palmer, became the Atom. Jean encountered the Atom who often helped in her cases many times before learning that he and Ray were the same person. Ray proposed to Jean often, but she rejected him, wanting to make it as a lawyer before becoming a wife. Only when Ray was thought killed in a car accident (engineered by the Bug-Eyed Bandit) did she accept his proposal.

In Atom and Hawkman #45 (November 1969), Jean was abducted and driven insane by the sub-atomic Jimberen race. Although quickly freed from the Jimberen by the Atom and Hawkman, Jean remained insane until Justice League of America #81 (June 1970), when she was cured by the equally insane alien the Jest-Master.

After Jean was kidnapped by T. O. Morrow, Ray embarks on an interdimensional search to find her. This event direly affected Jean, and also led to the end of their marriage. For a few years, they were happy – but Ray’s adventurous life began taking its toll on their marriage. Ray caught Jean having an affair with another man and they divorced.

Despite the occasional high-profile case, notably her defense of the Justice League, Jean did not truly come to national prominence until the divorce. Jean soon remarried and with her new husband, Paul Hoben, opened up a law office in Calvin City. She eventually returned to Ivy Town without him and established the firm of Grabemann, Loring and Ross. In general, Jean was not involved in criminal law anymore and attended to more mundane matters such as the administration of the estates of Carter Hall and David Clinton. She made exceptions, though, as in her defense of Risk of the Teen Titans.

=== Mental breakdown ===
Jean Loring in Identity Crisis. Art by Rags Morales.

Jean suffered a mental breakdown as revealed in the 2004 miniseries Identity Crisis. Wanting to resume her relationship with Ray, she came to believe that the surest way to do this was to endanger the loved one of another superhero. She believed that this would send all of the superheroes, including Ray, running back to their spouses and other relatives. Jean uses one of Ray's old costumes to shrink down and enter the brain of Sue Dibny, the Elongated Man's wife. She attempts to cause a minor stroke, but accidentally applies too much pressure and kills Sue.

Jean attempted to divert suspicion away from herself by faking an attack on her own life. She then sent out several mysterious death threats to others such as Lois Lane to make everyone think that there was a serial killer on the loose who was targeting the loved ones of superheroes. These events caused the superhero community to launch a massive investigation to identify the killer. In the final stage of her plan, Jean sends Captain Boomerang to attack Jack Drake, who kills him before dying.

As Jean had originally planned, Ray returned to her. However, during a conversation with Ray about the deaths of Jack and Boomerang, Jean accidentally incriminated herself by asking about the "Protect Yourself" note that was sent to Jack along with the gun, something that she should not have known about as Batman had removed the note from the crime scene before reporters had arrived. Caught in her lie, Jean confessed everything, and Ray had her institutionalized at Arkham Asylum.

=== Becoming Eclipso ===
Jean Loring as Eclipso. Art by Justiniano.

During her time in Arkham, the supernatural entity Eclipso (aided by the actions of the Psycho-Pirate and Alexander Luthor Jr.) manipulates Jean into becoming his new host so she could seduce the Spectre into destroying all of the magical beings in the DC Universe series Day of Vengeance.

Due to Eclipso's actions, the Spectre goes on a mass-murdering rampage, killing over 700 magicians. With all their lives in danger, a group of mystics band together, forming Shadowpact. They recruited Black Alice, a girl who has the ability to steal a person's magical powers for a short amount of time, leaving the being powerless in the process. The Shadowpact uses Black Alice's power to strip the Spectre of his own, leaving him defenseless. They then attempt to kill the Spectre while he is powerless. The plan hits a snag, as without his powers the Spectre is nothing but an empty spirit, leaving him invulnerable.

During her brief possession of the Spectre's powers, Black Alice uses them to help fellow Shadowpact member Nightshade send Eclipso into perpetual orbit around the Sun, weakening Eclipso's powers. However, Eclipso's incapacitation did not help Shadowpact with the Spectre, who continues to wreak havoc and ends up killing the ancient wizard Shazam. After the Spectre kills Nabu, the last and most powerful of the Lords of Order, the Presence's attention is finally drawn to him, and the Spectre is forced into a human host, finally stopping his rampage.

==== 52 ====
In 52, Ralph Dibny approaches the Spectre as part of his quest to restore his wife Sue to life, promising to fulfill any bargain demanded of him to accomplish this. The Spectre, desiring revenge on Eclipso, but rendered incapable of taking it owing to his then-lack of a host, orders Dibny to punish Eclipso in return for his wife's life; Dibny, temporarily granted the power of the Spectre, takes Eclipso back to the point at which she (as Jean Loring) murdered his wife and, restoring Jean's sanity, intends to trap her in a permanent time loop and force her to watch herself murder Sue Dibny over and over for all eternity. But the now-sane Loring tearfully begs for forgiveness and Dibny - affected by her pleas, his sense of compassion, and his own feelings on watching his wife's death - finds himself incapable of completing his pact with the Spectre. He thus returns Eclipso to her orbit around the Sun.

==== Countdown to Final Crisis ====
In Countdown to Final Crisis Eclipso corrupts Mary Marvel into becoming her follower. Mary Marvel rebels, and refusing to be given to Darkseid as a concubine, strips Eclipso of her black diamond, blasts her unconscious and leaves Eclipso powerless in space. Eclipso retrieves the diamond and attempts to kill Mary, only to find that Mary is too strong for her. During the battle, Mary calls down the magic lightning bolt, removing Eclipso's power from Jean. In Countdown to Mystery #4, following Mary and Eclipso's battle, the black diamond chooses Bruce Gordon as a host. Jean falls into the ocean near Themyscira as a shark approaches her.

=== Blackest Night ===
Jean Loring as a Black Lantern. Art by Ivan Reis.

In Green Lantern #43, it is confirmed by Black Hand that Jean Loring had died, since he can hear the voice of Death, which is later revealed to be Nekron, the "black personification" of it. In the Blackest Night storyline, Ray Palmer asks Hawkman to visit Jean's grave to be honored as a fallen member of the community, but Hawkman refuses because of what she did in Identity Crisis.

Jean is reanimated as a member of the Black Lantern Corps, wearing a costume based on her Eclipso persona. She kills Damage from behind, ripping out his heart as Ray stares in shock. This final kill helps the Black Rings reach a power level of one hundred percent, thus bringing about the rise of Nekron.

Jean then confronts Ray, who has recently been deputized into the Indigo Tribe, tormenting him with a recreation of her murder of Sue Dibny, and summoning Black Lantern versions of the Morlaidhans, the tribe Ray had befriended in the Sword of the Atom series, to attack him. However, Ray manages to fight back and destroy Jean and her ring.

=== DC Rebirth ===
Following the "DC Rebirth" event in 2016, it was revealed in Justice League of America #17 in late 2017 that the elements established in Identity Crisis had been retconned away, and Jean Loring was mentioned as being married once again to Ray Palmer.

In The New Golden Age, Jean Loring is depicted as a former host of Eclipso who is imprisoned in an Ivy Town prison.

== Other versions ==
Jean Loring appears in Justice.

== In other media ==
=== Television ===
- Characters based on Jean Loring appear in series set in the Arrowverse.
  - Loring herself appears in Arrow, portrayed by Teryl Rothery. This version is a defense attorney working in Starling City as well as a friend and lawyer to the Queen family.
  - Anna Loring appears in Arrow and Legends of Tomorrow, portrayed by Barbara Kottmeier. She was Ray Palmer's fiancée who was killed during Slade Wilson's soldiers' attack on Starling City.
  - A male character named John Loring appears in The Flash episode "A Girl Named Sue", portrayed by Silver Kim. He is an arms dealer who Sue Dearbon targets for a diamond in his possession.

=== Film ===
- An alternate universe variant of Jean Loring appears in Justice League: Gods and Monsters, voiced by Andrea Romano. This version is engaged to Ray Palmer.
- Jean Loring as Eclipso appears in the DC Super Hero Girls franchise, voiced by Mona Marshall.
