= Jack Drake =

- Jack Drake as seen in Robin: Cry of the Huntress #1 (December 1992). Art by Tom Lyle.

Publication information
- Publisher: DC Comics
- First appearance: Batman #436 (August 1989)
- Created by: Marv Wolfman

In-story information
- Alter ego: Jack Drake
- Team affiliations: Black Lantern Corps
- Supporting character of: Tim Drake

Jack Drake is a fictional character from DC Comics books, specifically the Batman titles. Jack is the father of Tim Drake, formerly the third Robin.

== Fictional character biography ==
Jack Drake and his wife Janet are respected businesspeople and archeologists who often leave their son Tim behind while traveling the world. During a trip to Haiti, the two are captured and held hostage by the Obeah Man. Both are affected by Obeah's poisoned water, with Janet dying while Jack is rendered comatose and temporarily paralyzed. After recovering, he begins dating and eventually marries his therapist Dana Winters.

When Tim Drake was young, his parents took him to Haly's Circus. Worried that her son might be afraid, Janet was somewhat reluctant to attend, until Jack suggested that they have their picture taken with some performers. At that point, the headliners of the circus, the Flying Graysons, were passing by, and happily agreed to the photo. Shortly afterward, Tim witnessed the Flying Graysons fall to their deaths after their equipment was sabotaged.

As the Drakes continued their travels around the world, Tim continued to follow the lives and careers of Batman and Robin. As such, Tim was aware of Dick Grayson becoming Nightwing and Jason Todd becoming the second Robin. Over time, the Drakes' marriage began to sour. During a trip over Haiti, the Drakes are captured and poisoned by a psychotic holy man called the Obeah Man. Janet is killed, while Jack is left comatose. Jack eventually regains consciousness, but is left paraplegic.

In time, Jack regains the use of his legs with the aid of physical therapist Dana Winters. Although Dana is considerably younger than Jack, the two have a mutual attraction and begin dating. In time, the two marry.

During the Identity Crisis storyline, Jean Loring hires Captain Boomerang to kill Jack Drake. Loring also sends Jack a gun, hoping that he will kill Boomerang and be suspected as the murderer of Sue Dibny in her place. Boomerang mortally wounds Jack, who kills him before dying.

Jack and Janet are temporarily resurrected as Black Lanterns in Blackest Night and permanently resurrected following The New 52 continuity reboot. In the DC Rebirth relaunch, the Drakes' history is retconned to be similar to the pre-New 52 version, with Jack Drake's death in Identity Crisis being returned to history.

== Other versions ==
An alternate universe variant of Jack Drake makes a minor appearance in Batman: Earth One. This version works as one of Oswald Cobblepot's lieutenants before being killed by the Riddler.

== In other media ==
- Steven Drake, a character based on Jack Drake, appears in The New Batman Adventures episode "Sins of the Father".
- Jack Drake appears in Titans, portrayed by Ryan Allen. This version is African-American and the head of an Asian restaurant in Gotham City.
