= Formerly Known as the Justice League =

Comic book superheroes

Super Buddies
- Cover of Formerly Known as the Justice League #1 (September 2003). Art by Kevin Maguire and Josef Rubinstein.

Publication information
- Publisher: DC Comics
- First appearance: Formerly Known as the Justice League #1 (September 2003)
- Created by: Keith Giffen; J. M. DeMatteis; Kevin Maguire; Josef Rubinstein

In-story information
- Base(s): Super Buddies Headquarters, Queens, New York
- Member(s): Blue Beetle; Booster Gold; Captain Atom; Elongated Man; Fire; Mary Marvel; Sue Dibny; Maxwell Lord; L-Ron

Super Buddies are a team of comic book superheroes in the DC Comics universe who appear in the six-issue Formerly Known as the Justice League miniseries in 2003, and its 2005 sequel, I Can't Believe It's Not the Justice League (published in JLA Classified). The team is put together by former Justice League bank roller Maxwell Lord as a superhero team "accessible to the common man". The team is considered more or less inept and incapable of being of any help by many (including the actual Justice League). The team was created by writers Keith Giffen and J. M. DeMatteis, and artists Kevin Maguire and Josef Rubinstein.

Giffen, DeMatteis, and Maguire previously created the tongue-in-cheek Justice League International comic book in the 1990s, and revived a similar style of comedy as that series featured.

== Formerly Known as the Justice League ==
Most of the Super Buddies recruited by Maxwell Lord and his robot sidekick L-Ron are former members of Justice League International when Giffen, DeMatteis, and Maguire worked on the series: Blue Beetle, Booster Gold, Fire, Ralph Dibny (Elongated Man) and his wife Sue, and Captain Atom. A seventh former member, Captain Marvel, is recruited by L-Ron, but he turns down the offer. His sister, Mary Marvel, joined in his place.

The Super Buddies do not and cannot get along: former friends Blue Beetle and Booster Gold constantly argue and attempt to prove to one another that they have matured. No one takes Booster or Ralph Dibny seriously, though not without good reason. Fire runs a website, "blazingfire.com", where she makes sensual pictures of herself available for download, and cannot get along with the polite and innocent Mary Marvel, whom Fire dubs "Mary Poppins". In addition, Fire convinces Sue that Ralph rates as "a four" (out of ten), giving Ralph an inferiority complex as a result. Captain Atom has no idea why he even joined the team, and is constantly tense and frustrated around the others. To top it all off, Lord plans to fully exploit his employees' images; he sets their headquarters up in a Queens, New York strip mall storefront, making the team available for contact through a 1-800 number and producing a Super Friends-esque television commercial for the Super Buddies.

This new team successfully defeats the E-Street Bloodsuckers, a gang of Harvard drop-out super-powered hoodlums, thanks to a well-timed slap from Mary. During their first team meeting, the Super Buddies are kidnapped by Roulette, who brainwashes them into serving as gladiators in her intergalactic metahuman arena. Mary Marvel and Captain Atom are pitted against each other, and the mind-controlled Mary nearly beats Atom and Fire to death before she overcomes her programming and the team is released from captivity.

While Beetle and Booster rush a seriously injured Captain Atom to a hospital, the others find that Manga Khan, L-Ron's former master, has come to Earth to reclaim him. Khan offers to trade G'nort, another former JLI member, for possession of L-Ron. When this offer is refused, and Booster accidentally knocks over many of Khan's sentries, Khan declares war on Earth. Only by the intervention of the real Justice League (who have been spying on the Super Buddies in anticipation of such a faux pas) is an intergalactic crisis avoided.

Formerly Known as the Justice League proved a popular miniseries, and won the 2004 Eisner Award for Best Comedy Series.

== I Can't Believe It's Not the Justice League ==
Booster Gold and Blue Beetle work at the (literal) fast-food restaurant from Hell, in JLA Classified #6, which included the third installment of the six-part miniseries I Can't Believe It's Not the Justice League.

Giffen, DeMatteis, and Maguire created a six-issue sequel to Formerly Known as the Justice League, I Can't Believe It's Not the Justice League, in 2004. Its publication was held off until 2005, after the end of the series Identity Crisis, in which Sue Dibny was killed.

I Can't Believe It's Not the Justice League, published in JLA Classified #4-9, finds the Super Buddies settling into their roles as superheroes for hire. Elongated Man is bragging about Sue allegedly being pregnant, when she is really not. Fire and Mary Batson (Mary Marvel's alter ego) become roommates, much to the distaste of Mary's brother Billy Batson (a.k.a. Captain Marvel). Captain Atom has quit the team because of the incident with Mary from the previous miniseries and sued Maxwell Lord, leading him to attempt to recruit Power Girl and Guy Gardner to join the team. Gardner causes several problems of his own: he is opening a bar next door to the Super Buddies' strip mall headquarters, and he takes delight in sexually harassing Fire, Sue, Power Girl, and Mary Marvel.

While visiting the Justice Society of America headquarters, Booster Gold begins messing around with Doctor Fate's talisman and inadvertently wishes the team to Hell. From the depths of Hell, Fire calls Sue for help, and Power Girl and Guy Gardner are recruited to follow the team to Hell and save them. While in Hell, the Super Buddies work at a version of Big Belly Burger called "Beelze Burger". Ralph foils the demons' plan to torture the Buddies. To the amazement of Fire and Gardner, the Super Buddies discover Ice, another former JLI member, among the denizens of Hell. Sickened by Fire and Gardner's displays of sorrow, the demons free the group, allowing them to take Ice with them as long as they do not look back on their way out. Fire accidentally looks back, and Ice is snatched back to the afterlife.

The group makes its way out of Hell, but soon find themselves trapped in an alternate universe populated by a team of sinister versions of themselves and their fellow heroes called the "Power Posse". This team is a group-for-hire who operated out of a strip club owned by Maxwell Lord and his moll, a version of Sue Dibny. The Power Posse consisted of a giant-sized G'nort who began a destructive rampage, sado-masochistic incestuous versions of Captain Marvel and Mary Marvel, who called herself Mistress Mary, a murderous Ice, now a stripper using the name Tiffany, an even stupider version of Booster working as a bartender, and bouncer Metamorpho. The Fire of this universe had been killed by Tiffany and Sue had divorced Ralph. Doctor Fate brings the team back to their correct dimension after they battle their doppelgängers.

== Infinite Crisis ==
It was revealed in Countdown to Infinite Crisis (2005) that Maxwell Lord was Checkmate's Black King, and had been collecting information on the Justice League members' weaknesses so that he could annihilate them. Blue Beetle had broken into Lord's secret headquarters and discovered his secret, but was murdered by Lord before he could warn anyone.
