= Bug-Eyed Bandit =

- The Bug-Eyed Bandit's debut, on the cover of The Atom #26. Art by Gil Kane.

Publication information
- Publisher: DC Comics
- First appearance: The Atom #26 (August–September 1966)
- Created by: Gardner Fox (script); Gil Kane (art)

In-story information
- Alter ego: Bertram Larvan
- Species: Human
- Team affiliations: Black Lantern Corps
- Abilities: Control of insects

Bug-Eyed Bandit is the name of two supervillains appearing in American comic books published by DC Comics.

An original incarnation of the Bug-Eyed Bandit appears in the Arrowverse series The Flash and Arrow, portrayed by Emily Kinney.

== Publication history ==
The Bertram Larvan incarnation of the Bug-Eyed Bandit first appeared in The Atom #26 (August–September 1966) and was created by Gardner Fox and Gil Kane.

The second Bug-Eyed Bandit first appeared in Justice League America #43 (October 1990), and was created by Keith Giffen, J.M. DeMatteis, and Adam Hughes.

== Fictional character biography ==
=== Bertram Larvan ===
Bertram Larvan was an inventor who designed a mechanical insect to control insect pests. However, he had no financial backing to support his invention and resolved to steal the money he needed. Larvan created an army of mechanical insects, including stag beetles who could bite through steel and spiders with webs that could support the weight of a man. Bertram took the name of the Bug-Eyed Bandit. He was thwarted by the Atom.

Larvan later accidentally discovers the Atom's identity of Ray Palmer and battles him on several occasions. He attempts to use amnesia-inducing gas on Palmer, but accidentally affects himself and is rendered amnesiac for years. During the Crisis on Infinite Earths, millions of Shadow Demons, servants of the Anti-Monitor, attack Earth, with Larvan being among the casualties.

Following his death, Larvan does not appear for many years. In Blackest Night, he is temporarily resurrected as a Black Lantern. He is later permanently resurrected following the DC Rebirth relaunch.

=== Son of the Bug-Eyed Bandit ===
Bug-Eyed Bandit

Publication information
- Publisher: DC Comics
- First appearance: Justice League of America #43 (October 1990)
- Created by: Keith Giffen; J.M. DeMatteis; Adam Hughes

In-story information
- Team affiliations: Secret Society of Super Villains
- Abilities: Control of insects

The second Bug-Eyed Bandit is the unnamed son of the original and a member of the Secret Society of Super Villains.

== Powers and abilities ==
The Bug-Eyed Bandit is a skilled roboticist who commands a horde of robotic insects.

== In other media ==
=== Television ===
Brie Larvan (Emily Kinney) as she appears in The Flash.

- An unidentified incarnation of the Bug-Eyed Bandit appears in Batman: The Brave and the Bold, voiced by Dee Bradley Baker. This version can shrink to the size of an insect.
- An original, female incarnation of the Bug-Eyed Bandit named Brie Larvan, appears in TV series set in the Arrowverse, portrayed by Emily Kinney. This version is a scientist and former employee at Mercury Labs who wields remote-controlled robotic bees.
- The Bertram Larvan incarnation of the Bug-Eyed Bandit makes a non-speaking cameo appearance in the Creature Commandos episode "Chasing Squirrels". This version is an inmate of Belle Reve Penitentiary.

=== Video games ===
The Bertram Larvan incarnation of the Bug-Eyed Bandit appears as a character summon in Scribblenauts Unmasked: A DC Comics Adventure.
