= Tim Trench =

- Tim Trench as depicted in Who's Who: The Definitive Directory of the DC Universe #24 (February 1987). Art by Sandy Plunkett (penciler) and P. Craig Russell (inker).

Publication information
- Publisher: DC Comics
- First appearance: Wonder Woman v1 #179 (November–December 1968)
- Created by: Dennis O'Neil

In-story information
- Full name: Timothy Trench
- Team affiliations: Hero Hotline; Croatoan Society

Tim Trench is a character in the DC Comics universe, who first appeared in Wonder Woman v1 #179 (November–December 1968). He was later killed in 52 Week 18 (September 2006).

== Fictional character biography ==
Introduced as an ally of the pre-Crisis Wonder Woman, Timothy Trench's first appearance was in Wonder Woman #179 (November–December 1968), with his first formal appearance being the next issue. A middle-aged tough guy and private eye, Trench carries a single gun, which he lovingly referred to as "Lulu". Trench is based on the character Sam Spade from The Maltese Falcon, using the word "gunsel" as Spade did to refer to low-level hoodlums. Tim aided Wonder Woman and I Ching in defeating the terrorist Doctor Cyber.

Trench is reintroduced in Detective Comics #460 (June 1976) with a two-part back-up story. Appearing considerably younger, Trench is based in St. Louis with an office above a repertory theatre that consistently screens Humphrey Bogart films. Trench had abandoned "Lulu" for twin .357 Magnum guns housed in shoulder holsters.

Twenty years later, Trench resurfaced having joined the superhero team Hero Hotline. The only chronicled mission Trench underwent as a member of the team was witnessed in the Vertigo title Swamp Thing. Trench was absent from all the action, having been caught in traffic. Trench is killed by Felix Faust in the series 52, where he is revealed to have been a member of the Croatoan Society alongside Ralph Dibny, Detective Chimp, Edogawa Sangaku, and Traci Thirteen. The other members of the Croatoan Society discover Trench's body during a scheduled meeting at the House of Mystery.
