= Captain Boomerang =

DC Comics supervillain

- George "Digger" Harkness as Captain Boomerang, as depicted in The Flash #148 (November 1964). Art by Carmine Infantino (pencils) and Murphy Anderson (inks).

Publication information
- Publisher: DC Comics
- First appearance: George "Digger" Harkness: The Flash #117 (December 1960); Owen Mercer: Identity Crisis #3 (October 2004)
- Created by: George "Digger" Harkness: John Broome; Carmine Infantino; Owen Mercer: Brad Meltzer; Michael Turner

In-story information
- Alter ego: George "Digger" Harkness (Captain Boomerang I); Owen Mercer (Captain Boomerang II)
- Species: Human
- Team affiliations: Suicide Squad; Justice League; Secret Society of Super Villains; Rogues
- Notable aliases: Mirror Master II
- Abilities: Expert marksman; Expert combatant; Utilizes various trick and weaponized boomerangs

Captain Boomerang is the name of two supervillains appearing in American comic books published by DC Comics, who respectively serve as enemies to both the Barry Allen and Wally West versions of the Flash. Created by writer John Broome and artist Carmine Infantino, the first Captain Boomerang, George "Digger" Harkness, first appeared in The Flash #117 (December 1960). He has also been a prominent member of the Suicide Squad since its second iteration in the late 1980s. During the 2004 storyline Identity Crisis, George Harkness is killed and his son, Owen Mercer, created by Brad Meltzer and Michael Turner, takes over his father's role as Captain Boomerang for a period of time. However, during the 2009–2010 Blackest Night storyline, Owen is killed and Harkness returns to life, resuming his role as Captain Boomerang, and, overwhelmed by grief and rage, evolves as a dangerous threat after the loss of his son.

Both Harkness and Mercer have been adapted from the comics into various forms of media, including television series, feature films, and video games. In particular, Harkness appeared in the Arrowverse television series Arrow, portrayed by Nick E. Tarabay, and the DC Extended Universe films Suicide Squad (2016) and The Suicide Squad (2021), portrayed by Jai Courtney. Additionally, Mercer appears in the Arrowverse series The Flash, portrayed by Richard Harmon.

== Publication history ==
George "Digger" Harkness appeared in The Flash #117 (December 1960) and was created by writer John Broome and artist Carmine Infantino. Throughout the first several years of the character's existence, Captain Boomerang spoke with an American accent. Beginning in the late 1980s, he developed an Australian accent.

Owen Mercer first appeared in Identity Crisis #3 (2004), and was created by Brad Meltzer and Rags Morales.

== Fictional character biographies ==
=== George "Digger" Harkness ===
George "Digger" Harkness's debut as Captain Boomerang on the cover of Flash #117 (Dec. 1960)

Secretly the illegitimate son of an American soldier and an Australian woman, Harkness was raised in an Australian town called Korumburra in poverty, during which time he developed great skill in making boomerangs, and in using them as weapons. As a young adult, he was hired as a performer and boomerang promoter by a toy company which was, unbeknownst to him, owned by his biological father. It was at this time that he developed the Captain Boomerang persona that he would continue to use in his later criminal career. Audiences ridiculed him, and a resentful Harkness turned to using his boomerangs for crime.

When he began committing crimes, he threw suspicion off himself by briefly pretending another man was impersonating him, showing his 'parents', (really other crooks) to the Flash after the Flash caught him next to a crime scene. He nearly succeeded in killing the Flash after knocking him out with a boomerang, then tying him to a giant boomerang that he fired, which then got sent into space and then fell into the ocean. However, the Flash escapes from his friction-proof bonds by quickly vibrating his molecules. He also increased the boomerang's velocity so much he was able to use it to defeat and jail Harkness and the two crooks.

Boomerang becomes a recurring enemy of the Flash and joins the Rogues, a group of villains dedicated to opposing Flash. Later on, Harkness joins the Suicide Squad in exchange for a pardon. However, his grating personality and blatant racism cause considerable friction among his teammates, and he is considered to be a dangerous, vicious, cowardly and undependable member. Boomerang attempted to bring some levity to his SUICIDE SQUAD stretch by becoming "The Mad Pieman", secretly splattering his teammates with "Boomerang Pies" while he played innocent. Amanda Waller was not amused and banished Boomerang to a deserted island as punishment.

George "Digger" Harkness as Captain Boomerang on the cover of The Flash (vol. 3) #7 (Jan. 2011), art by Francis Manapul

Captain Boomerang was killed in the Identity Crisis miniseries by Jack Drake, father of Tim Drake. Digger had been sent by the real killer to attack Jack Drake, only the killer double-crossed Digger and sent Drake a warning and a pistol to defend himself. The killer later defended the action by saying that Boomerang was hired because he was such an incompetent that Jack would only need to pull the trigger and he would be safe. Digger managed to kill Drake but not before he was shot himself.

In the Blackest Night crossover, his remains are reanimated as a member of the Black Lantern Corps, and he joins the reanimated Jack and Janet Drake, John and Mary Grayson, Tony Zucco, and the original Batman's deceased rogues gallery members in an attempt to kill Batman and Red Robin. Digger manages to escape and join in the mass battle against the heroes where he is brought back to life and rejuvenated. He appears confused as to what is going on before being knocked out by the Flash.

Following his resurrection, Captain Boomerang is at one point contacted by the Life Entity, who instructs him to throw a boomerang at Dawn Granger. After seeing the vision, his powers go out of control, causing him to attack everyone, including his fellow Rogues. Afterwards, Captain Boomerang sneaks into Iron Heights, where Professor Zoom is locked up. Boomerang releases him, in hopes that Zoom might help him better understand his version of the Entity's message. However, Zoom refused to answer and escaped as Digger was confronted by the Rogues. Captain Cold beats up Digger for freeing Zoom, then Digger explains to him the importance of the Entity's message. Later, Captain Boomerang is contacted once again by the Entity, who tells him that he must complete his task, prompting Digger to travel to Star City forest, which by now is surrounded by a white barrier. While there, Captain Boomerang discovers that he is the only one who can enter the forest. Within the forest, Captain Boomerang finds Dawn and throws a boomerang at her. Hawk, however, fails to catch the boomerang and instead, the boomerang is caught by Deadman, who ended up dying in the process and Hawk is left to knock Captain Boomerang unconscious. After the Entity proclaims Captain Boomerang has completed his task, and his life is restored to him, the Entity reveals to them that the boomerang was part of a plan to free Hawk from his role as an avatar of war from the Lords of Chaos: his act of saving Dawn would have broken the hold the Lords of Chaos have on Hawk and allow Hank to be true to himself.

Captain Boomerang during The New 52. Art by Lee Bermejo.

George Harkness returns as Captain Boomerang in The New 52, a 2011 reboot of the DC Comics universe. Captain Boomerang and a new character called Yo-Yo join the Suicide Squad to replace the deceased members Savant and Voltaic. He tells the team that he is the new field commander for the Suicide Squad, having been placed in that position by Amanda Waller. But this is further revealed to be a set-up orchestrated to give them a bargaining chip to bypass an armed Basilisk militia led by the sister of one of his victims. Realizing the trap, Boomerang attempts to use a detonator he was given that is supposed to be connected to the microbombs in each Squad member's skin. It fails to function, and Deadshot mocks him for thinking that Waller would trust him with that kind of power before shooting his hand.

=== Owen Mercer ===
Captain Boomerang
- Captain Boomerang (Owen Mercer), panel from Identity Crisis #6 (January 2005), art by Rags Morales

Publication information
- Publisher: DC Comics
- First appearance: Identity Crisis #3 (October 2004)
- Created by: Brad Meltzer; Rags Morales

In-story information
- Alter ego: Owen Mercer
- Species: Metahuman
- Team affiliations: Rogues; The Society; Outsiders; Suicide Squad; Black Lantern Corps
- Notable aliases: Owen Harkness, Captain Boomerang Jr., Silver Boomerang
- Abilities: Utilizes various trick and weaponized boomerangs Limited superhuman speed called "speed bursts"

At the beginning of the 2004 Identity Crisis storyline, "Digger" Harkness a.k.a. Captain Boomerang found himself an obsolete villain in the modern world of supervillains. Regularly going up to the supervillain satellite looking for jobs, asking favors from the Calculator, he was at the end of his rope looking for a job to put him on the map again.

During this time he felt it was finally time to reach out to the son he never raised, Owen Mercer. Before Harkness's death, the two bonded. Taking up his father's legacy, he became the second Captain Boomerang. Captain Cold, brother to Golden Glider (who was believed to be Owen's mother), took Owen in as one of the Rogues.

Though Owen initially had no real attachment to the Rogues (and even voiced various, albeit short, opinions out loud), he grew to enjoy the purpose and sense of family the team offered after finding that his father's body had been stolen for use in a lab (which was later revealed to be part of a plan to get memories from Harkness).

Around this time the Rogue War storyline began, in which the "reformed" Rogues fought the Rogues under Captain Cold. Ashley Zolomon is told by Harkness himself (he is briefly revived by the "reformed" Rogues as part of an experiment) that Golden Glider is not Owen's real mother. Later, it is revealed that Meloni Thawne is the mother of Owen Harkness, formerly Owen Mercer, the new Captain Boomerang, having conceived him by the original Boomerang while he was trapped in the 30th century.

During the 2005–2006 Infinite Crisis storyline, Owen was part of Alexander Luthor Jr.'s group of villains. He, Captain Cold, and Mirror Master were sent to guard a factory against the Outsiders, under the command of Deathstroke (who was actually Arsenal in disguise). When the ensuing battle between Outsiders and Rogues destroyed the machinery in the factory, the Rogues and other villains would not help in the fight at all and then at the explosion, he is saved by the Outsiders, while the Rogues left them at the base to blow up. He is then turned over to the authorities off-panel.

During the 52 series, Owen is part of a Suicide Squad sent by Amanda Waller to attack Black Adam.

In the 2006 One Year Later storyline, Owen is imprisoned in Iron Heights Penitentiary. There he finds himself being the cellmate of Black Lightning, who was arrested for a murder that Deathstroke committed. It is soon discovered that the other inmates have learned of Black Lightning's identity and are planning to murder him. The Outsiders become aware of this and attempt to break Black Lightning out of jail. Unfortunately it goes terribly wrong. As they escape, Black Lightning asks that they take Owen with them, which they grudgingly agree. As they escape, the Outsiders' jet, the Pequod, is shot down, and while the team escapes, the world believes them dead.

Because of this event and the Freedom of Power Treaty, the team now works covertly. Most of the current Outsiders were believed dead until a botched mission revealed their presence to the world. His history as a Rogue has been exploited several times by team leader Nightwing from torturing dictators to taking down a cloned Jay Garrick. However, it is revealed that his desire to join the Outsiders comes from his desire for a family. Nightwing allowed him to join his team partially because Arsenal felt he would be worthy, and because Owen has been striving to find a family since the death of his father and the outbreak of the Rogue War.

Owen searched out the current Robin because of their connection, where their fathers killed one another. While Robin originally believed Owen was searching for him to finish the fight his father started, Owen revealed that he wished to make amends with the younger hero, and has offered his assistance to help Robin destroy a bomb created by the Joker. The two later spend the following night spreading out old hideouts of several villains. Afterward, Robin gained a bit of civil respect for Boomerang despite what their fathers did to one another. Boomerang attempted to shake hands with Robin, but Robin refused the gesture feeling unready to make that step.

At some point during his tenure with the Outsiders, Captain Cold approached the mercenary Deathstroke with an offer concerning Owen. In exchange for kidnapping Deathstroke's daughter Rose (who had betrayed her father and joined the Teen Titans) and delivering her to her father, Deathstroke would track down the Outsiders and turn Owen over to the Rogues. The villains planned to force Owen to cooperate with the team by administering the same mind-controlling agent that Deathstroke had used on his daughter as well as Batman's partner Cassandra Cain. However, this plan fell apart when Rose escaped and helped the Teen Titans defeat the Rogues, which led to Deathstroke backing out of the deal.

Owen has also developed a close friendship with Supergirl, Kara Zor-El. After Supergirl returned from her time away with Power Girl, Kara began looking to start a normal life on Earth and went out a 'date' with Owen, during which they spoke of their past problems. Kara has nicknamed Owen 'Boomer'. Although the pair often flirts with one another, they have never progressed to a romantic relationship. This comes primarily from the fact that Kara continues to show interest in Nightwing, and jokingly says that what she and Owen has is more of a brother-sister relationship, in which he has an unhealthy fixation on his 'little sis'.

Feeling rejected after Kara's relationship with Power Boy, Owen goes to a bar where he meets Cassandra Cain (Batgirl), who at the time was being mind-controlled by Deathstroke, and who had been hired to kill Supergirl. Cassandra kidnaps and tortures Owen to lure Supergirl. Unfortunately, this proves unnecessary, as Kara had tracked down Cassandra on her own, without any knowledge of Owen's kidnapping. Batgirl nearly manages to defeat Supergirl, but is defeated when Kara grows Krypton Sunstones which impale her foe. Kara then rushes Owen to the hospital where he is treated. While still in medical care, it is discovered that Power Boy has been stalking Kara.

Following Kara's break-up with Power Boy, the Earth was overtaken by spirits from the Phantom Zone, which began to emerge from within Superman. Kara managed to defeat the Phantoms and return the Earth to normal. Kara begins to make amends with all the people who she has hurt since arriving on Earth. Amongst them, Boomer, to whom she apologises for letting him get hurt and leading him on. During this conversation, the matter of Owen's relationship with Kara is finally clarified. When asked by Kara how he feels about her leading him on, Owen replies, "Well, if I may ... for me to have been 'led on' would presume I thought I had a shot with you ... For me to think I had a shot with a sixteen-year-old girl -- crystal-powered hypersleep whatever junk aside ... that would mean I am a dirtbag with a thing for jailbait. Which I am not".

Checkmate abducts all members of the Outsiders except Nightwing, allowing him to infiltrate their headquarters to offer them a deal: The Outsiders will not be shut down over their actions in Africa in exchange for infiltrating Oolong Island on behalf of Checkmate. During the operation, Nightwing, Owen, and Checkmate's Black Queen are taken captive by Chang Tzu, and the latter two are tortured and experimented on. After Batman rescues the Outsiders over North Korean territory, and Nightwing hands over the team to him, Owen and Nightwing are paired with each other in "auditions" for the new lineup. Pushed too far, feeling he does not need to prove himself anymore, Owen returns to the Suicide Squad although Batman feels he could make a good double agent.

Owen, as part of the new Suicide Squad, captures Heat Wave and Weather Wizard in revenge for the murder of Bart Allen. He and the rest of the Squad chase after Piper and Trickster in Gotham City after they had escaped capture from Squad member Deadshot. The Squad however is just as unsuccessful as Deadshot, and the two Rogues escape capture. Owen is killed by his father, the first Captain Boomerang, and resurrected as a Black Lantern shortly afterward.

Owen Mercer is resurrected following The New 52 and DC Rebirth relaunches, which rebooted the continuity of the DC universe.

== Powers and abilities ==
Captain Boomerang carries a number of boomerangs in his satchel. He is an expert at throwing the weapons and as well as ordinary boomerangs he has a number with special properties, including bladed, explosive, incendiary, and electrified boomerangs. Upon his resurrection, Digger finds he has the ability to create boomerangs out of energy that explode on contact. However, this new ability is lost when he completes the task given by the Life Entity.

The original Captain Boomerang then began to train his son Owen Mercer before he died. He has exhibited creativity in his boomerangs by creating "razorangs" and an acid-spewing boomerang. Owen has also exhibited "speed bursts", short bursts of limited super speed over short distances, most notably when throwing boomerangs. These were even possible during the time period that Owen fully contained the Speed Force, usually displayed as his ability to throw boomerangs at high velocities, rather than running. However, during Chang Tzu's experiments, he claimed he believed Mercer could access the Speed Force, and Mercer denied having super speed at all anymore, but Chang Tzu was able to activate Owen's speed involuntarily, causing him great pain. The exact source of this power remains unrevealed. Regardless, as of Justice Society of America #8, the Speed Force appears to have returned and is accessible to all former speedsters once more.

== Other versions ==
- An alternate universe version of Captain Boomerang called Adam Clay appears in the Tangent Comics one-shot Green Lantern. This version is a disenfranchised pilot whose family was killed by a Japanese army. Clay escapes in his family's crop duster and forms a group of pilots under the nickname "Captain Boomerang" for his family's Australian origins and the CAC Boomerang plane.
- An older, alternate universe version of Digger Harkness appears in Kingdom Come.
- An alternate universe version of Digger Harkness / Captain Boomerang appears in Absolute Flash. This version was a captain in the U.S. Army before he and his unit, the Rogues, were dishonorably discharged for taking bribes from a foreign government before being recruited by Project Olympus, who equipped them with experimental technology.

== In other media ==
=== Television ===
- The George "Digger" Harkness incarnation of Captain Boomerang appears in Justice League Unlimited, voiced by Donal Gibson. This version is a member of Task Force X and the Rogues.
- The George "Digger" Harkness incarnation of Captain Boomerang appears in Batman: The Brave and the Bold, voiced by John DiMaggio.
- The George "Digger" Harkness incarnation of Captain Boomerang appears in Arrow, portrayed by Nick E. Tarabay. This version is a former ASIS agent and member of A.R.G.U.S.'s Suicide Squad. While working for the latter, his commanding officer Lyla Michaels was ordered to scrub a failed mission and "sanitize" the active Squad members via implanted nano-bombs. However, Harkness' bomb failed to detonate, leading to him seeking revenge against her. In the episodes "Draw Back Your Bow" and "The Brave and the Bold", he resurfaces in the present to kill Michaels, only to be foiled by Oliver Queen, the Flash, and their respective teams. Following this, Harkness is imprisoned in an A.R.G.U.S. prison on the island Lian Yu. In the episode "Lian Yu", Oliver recruits Harkness to battle Prometheus. While Harkness betrays Oliver to join Prometheus, Malcolm Merlyn sacrifices himself to save Oliver by killing Harkness with a landmine.
- The Owen Mercer incarnation of Captain Boomerang appears in the ninth season of The Flash (2014), portrayed by Richard Harmon. This version is a member of the Red Death's Rogues who possesses the additional ability to teleport and wields boomerangs constructed from Wayne Enterprises' technology.
- The George "Digger" Harkness incarnation of Captain Boomerang appears in the Young Justice episode "Leverage", voiced by Crispin Freeman. This version is a member of Task Force X.
- The George "Digger" Harkness incarnation of Captain Boomerang appears in Harley Quinn, voiced by Josh Helman. This version is a member of the Suicide Squad's "A-Team".

=== Film ===
- The Owen Mercer incarnation of Captain Boomerang makes a non-speaking cameo appearance in Superman/Batman: Public Enemies.
- The George "Digger" Harkness incarnation of Captain Boomerang makes a minor non-speaking appearance in Lego Batman: The Movie - DC Super Heroes Unite.
- The George "Digger" Harkness incarnation of Captain Boomerang appears in films set in the DC Animated Movie Universe (DCAMU):
  - Harkness first appears in Justice League: The Flashpoint Paradox, voiced by James Patrick Stuart. This version is a member of the Rogues. Additionally, an alternate universe variant from the Flashpoint timeline makes a cameo appearance.
  - Harkness appears in Suicide Squad: Hell to Pay, voiced by Liam McIntyre. After being recruited into Amanda Waller's Suicide Squad, he forms a rivalry with Deadshot.
  - Harkness appears in Justice League Dark: Apokolips War, voiced by McIntyre. Having survived Darkseid's assault on Earth two years prior, he and the Suicide Squad assist Superman and Lois Lane in reaching a LexCorp building in an attempt to destroy Apokolips and defeat Darkseid before the group sacrifice themselves to stop Darkseid's Paradooms.
- The George "Digger" Harkness incarnation of Captain Boomerang appears in Batman: Assault on Arkham, voiced by Greg Ellis. This version is a veteran Suicide Squad member who competes with Deadshot over leadership.
- The George "Digger" Harkness incarnation of Captain Boomerang appears in films set in the DC Extended Universe (DCEU), portrayed by Jai Courtney. This version is a member of the Suicide Squad before being killed in battle in Corto Maltese.
- The George "Digger" Harkness incarnation of Captain Boomerang makes a cameo appearance in The Lego Batman Movie.
- The George "Digger" Harkness incarnation of Captain Boomerang appears in Lego DC Comics Super Heroes: The Flash, voiced by Dee Bradley Baker.
- The George "Digger" Harkness incarnation of Captain Boomerang makes a cameo appearance in Injustice.

=== Video games ===
- Both George "Digger" Harkness and Owen Mercer appear in DC Universe Online, voiced by Shanon Weaver. The latter serves as a tech dealer in the Hall of Doom.
- The George "Digger" Harkness incarnation of Captain Boomerang appears as a playable character in Suicide Squad: Kill the Justice League, voiced by Daniel Lapaine.

==== Lego ====
- The George "Digger" Harkness incarnation of Captain Boomerang appears as an unlockable playable character in Lego Batman 2: DC Super Heroes, voiced by Nolan North.
- The George "Digger" Harkness incarnation of Captain Boomerang appears as a playable character in Lego Batman 3: Beyond Gotham via "The Squad" DLC.
- The George "Digger" Harkness incarnation of Captain Boomerang appears as an unlockable playable character in Lego DC Super-Villains, voiced by Gideon Emery.

=== Miscellaneous ===
- The George "Digger" Harkness incarnation of Captain Boomerang makes a cameo appearance in the Injustice: Gods Among Us prequel comic.
- The George "Digger" Harkness incarnation of Captain Boomerang appears in The Flash: Season Zero as a member of A.R.G.U.S.'s Suicide Squad.
- The George "Digger" Harkness incarnation of Captain Boomerang makes a cameo appearance in a flashback in the Arrow tie-in novel, Arrow: Vengeance, in which he trained with Slade Wilson during his time in the ASIS.
- The George "Digger" Harkness incarnation of Captain Boomerang appears in the Batman: Arkham Knight prequel comic as a member of Harley Quinn's Suicide Squad before he is hired by Amanda Waller to join Deadshot in assassinating Bruce Wayne. However, Digger is betrayed and killed by Deadshot.
- The George "Digger" Harkness incarnation of Captain Boomerang appears in the Injustice 2 prequel comic as a member of Ra's al Ghul's Suicide Squad.

=== Merchandise ===
- An unidentified incarnation of Captain Boomerang received a figure in wave 18 of the DC Universe Classics line.
- An unidentified incarnation of Captain Boomerang received a figure in the Justice League Unlimited tie-in toy line.
- The Owen Mercer incarnation of Captain Boomerang received a figure in Mattel's "DC Infinite Crisis" line.

== See also ==
- Boomerang (character) – a similar villain in Marvel Comics
