= Black Lantern Corps =

Fictional organization appearing in comics published by DC Comics

- Interior artwork from Blackest Night 1 (July 2009); Art by Ivan Reis

Publication information
- Publisher: DC Comics
- First appearance: Central Power Battery: Green Lantern (vol. 4) #25 (January 2008); Corps: Blackest Night #1 (September 2009)
- Created by: Geoff Johns (writer); Ethan Van Sciver (artist)

Roster

The Black Lantern Corps is a supervillainous organization of corporeal revenants (resembling intelligent zombies or jiangshi) appearing in American comic books published by DC Comics, who – unlike the other Lantern corps – represent a space outside of the emotional spectrum, with black being the absence of light. The group is composed of deceased fictional characters in zombie form that seek to eliminate all life from the DC Universe.

== Publication history ==
Black Hand (the "leader" and first member of the Black Lantern Corps) was created before the Blackest Night storyline. Writer Geoff Johns revisited the character's origin and expanded upon certain aspects of it during the Green Lantern: Secret Origin story arc (2008). During the arc, Hand's energy-absorbing weapon (previously thought to be an original invention) is revealed to have been constructed by Atrocitus, enemy of the Guardians of the Universe and founder of the Red Lantern Corps. Atrocitus comes to Earth and approaches Hand, recognizing him as a "doorway to the black" that possesses the power to bring about the Blackest Night. Hand manages to escape and pockets the weapon as he flees. The possession of this weapon soon leads him to become an enemy of the Green Lantern Corps, as he now feels a need to extinguish the light of the emotional spectrum.

While being transported to prison, Black Hand experiences a sudden power surge that kills his captors. He roams the desert, hearing a voice instructing him to reclaim the souls of characters who were reanimated. Hand murders his family and commits suicide. The Guardian Scar arrives, and creates the first black power ring, which reanimates Black Hand. She reveals that Hand is the physical embodiment of death, and serves as the avatar of the Black Lantern Corps. Hand later digs up Bruce Wayne's corpse, removes his skull, and recites the Black Lantern oath for the first time. Soon after, black power rings descend upon the universe and begin reviving the deceased as Black Lanterns.

In Blackest Night #3, Indigo-1 describes the premise behind the Black Lantern Corps' relationship with the universe. She explains that the darkness in existence before the creation of the universe is what powers the Black Lanterns. Banished at the dawn of time by the white light of creation, its fighting back causes the white light to be fractured into the emotional spectrum. The events transpiring throughout the titles of Blackest Night are a result of the darkness fighting back against creation. She goes on to describe how a combination of all seven lights can restore the white light of creation and bring an end to the Black Lanterns. Throughout the Blackest Night event, each time a Black Lantern successfully removes the heart of one of their victims, a black, lantern-shaped speech balloon depicts an ever-rising power level increasing in increments of 0.1 percent. In Blackest Night #4, the power meter is filled, allowing Scar to summon Nekron.

After being introduced into a primary role in Blackest Night, Indigo-1 recruits Hal Jordan to gather a team capable of recreating the white light of creation (chosen for having a personal connection to the most powerful members of the five remaining Corps). The story unfolding in Green Lantern depicts Jordan and Indigo-1 recruiting Carol Ferris, Sinestro, Atrocitus, Larfleeze, and Saint Walker to their purpose. In Blackest Night #5, the team assaults the Black Central Power Battery with the opposite results intended. Nekron is strengthened and able to recruit living characters reanimated from death to his Black Lantern Corps. Although the seven Corps representatives attempt to summon aid by recruiting temporary deputies until the rest of their Corps arrive, they are nearly thwarted when Nekron attempts to kill the Life Entity, the first life in the universe. After Sinestro attempts and fails to merge with the entity, Jordan takes control of the Entity himself, noting that the heroes still chose to return to life even if Nekron gave them the opportunity. With this behind him, Jordan merges with the entity and frees the reanimated heroes from Nekron's hold, creating the White Lantern Corps in the process. Jordan subsequently reanimates Black Hand and the Anti-Monitor to deprive Nekron of his tether in the living world and his power source.

== Prominent members ==
At San Diego Comic-Con in 2009, Geoff Johns discussed his reasoning behind choosing Black Hand as the leader of the new Corps, the character properties of the Black Lanterns, and his own goals in writing their depictions. Commenting on the characters being chosen to reanimate during Blackest Night, Johns said:

The black rings aren't about who's dead; the black rings are about who's alive. So, scenes like Elongated Man and Sue Dibny taking on Hawkman and Hawkgirl is kind of the beginning of that emotional conflict and terror that you'll see throughout Blackest Night. So the black rings are, again, seeking out the dead that matter to our heroes.

During the creation of Blackest Night, Johns (not being interested in, or frightened by, zombies) wanted to bring back the deceased characters in a way that seemed horrifying and emotionally disturbing to the living characters they encountered. To accomplish that effect, the Black Lanterns have personalities and actively seek out those who will be most affected by their appearance. A prime example of Johns' use of personality distortion with the Black Lanterns is the Elongated Man (typically depicted as being a "light" character that uses his detective skill to "smell" when something is not right) looking upon his victims and remarking to his undead wife Sue Dibny: "I smell a mystery." Johns identifies the power of the Black Lanterns as not necessarily being evil, but not being good either.

During his initial creation of the new Corps, Johns drew from information he had collected on light while taking physics classes. With the Corps of the emotional spectrum personifying life, he knew that this Corps would need to represent death. Black being an absence of light, he chose Black Hand as the leader of the Corps both for the character's name and also because of how much he enjoyed revamping villains while writing for Flash. Like the other members of the Black Lantern Corps, Johns wanted to take a different approach in his portrayal of Black Hand. Whereas other villains may have a particular motivation, Hand is meant to be depicted as a character who is clearly insane and whose presence makes others uncomfortable.

In Blackest Night #2, multiple black power rings attempt to reanimate the body of Dove, only to be prevented from disturbing his grave by an invisible barrier. Dove is stated to be at peace in death and unable to be resurrected. In an interview with IGN, Johns provides an explanation behind Dove's immunity to the black power rings: "You'll learn more about this as we go forward. But really it speaks to the nature of Don Hall. He can't be desecrated by the likes of these things. He's untouchable in death and at total peace more than any other being in the universe."

In Blackest Night: Batman #1, the spirit of Deadman is unable to prevent a black power ring from reviving his remains. Deadman attempts to possess his own corpse, but is unable to control it. During the Blackest Night panel at San Diego Comic-Con in 2009, Geoff Johns was asked whether the revived corpses of the Black Lanterns were speaking for themselves or if they were being controlled by an outside force. Johns declined to answer, implying that the question would be answered during the Blackest Night storyline. Similarly, while being overcome by a black power ring, the Spectre declares that he "will not be used." Prior to the Spectre's conversion, Black Hand makes note of Shadowpact members Zatanna and Blue Devil being surrounded by an aura of life. Upon scanning the Phantom Stranger, Black Hand remarks that the Stranger is "neither living nor dead", and notes him as of interest to his Corps.

== List of Black Lanterns ==
=== Current members ===
- Black Hand – Referred to as "the black incarnate".
- Batman – Killed in the invasion of the Dark Knights from the Dark Multiverse, Bruce Wayne was resurrected by a Black Lantern ring.

=== Former members ===
Leadership

- Nekron – Leader of the Black Lantern Corps
- Scar – Guardian of the Corps and keeper of The Book of the Black

Blackest Night #1 (September 2009)

- Katma Tui
- Martian Manhunter
- Elongated Man
- Sue Dibny

Blackest Night #2 (October 2009)

- Aquaman – Named in issue #1, but not shown in costume
- Deadman – Also featured in Blackest Night: Batman, which shipped the same week
- Hawk (Hank Hall)
- Aquagirl (Tula)
- Dolphin
- Pariah
- Crispus Allen
- Tempest (Garth)
- Firestorm – Named in issue #1, shown in issue #2
- Hawkgirl (Kendra Saunders) – Killed in issue #1, shown in issue #2
- Hawkman (Carter Hall) – Killed in issue #1, shown in issue #2

Blackest Night: Batman #1 (October 2009)

- Abattoir
- Blockbuster (Roland Desmond)
- Deacon Blackfire
- KGBeast
- King Snake
- Magpie
- Trigger Twins
- Ventriloquist (Arnold Wesker)
- John and Mary Grayson
- Jack Drake
- Janet Drake

Green Lantern Corps (vol. 2) #39 (October 2009)

- Jack T. Chance – Shown, but not named, in Blackest Night #1
- Tomar-Re
- Jade – Named in Blackest Night #1, but not shown in costume.

Blackest Night: Superman #1 (October 2009)

- Superman (Earth-Two)
- Lois Lane (Earth-Two)
- Zor-El

Blackest Night: Titans #1 (October 2009)

- Terra (Tara Markov)
- Omen

Green Lantern (vol. 4) #45 (October 2009)

- Hal Jordan
- Amon Sur
- Blume
- Xanshi; as a Mogo analogue
- Glomulus

Solomon Grundy #7 (November 2009)

- Solomon Grundy

Green Lantern Corps (vol. 2) #40 (November 2009)

- Bzzd – Shown, but not named, in Blackest Night #1

Blackest Night #3 (November 2009)

- Alexander Luthor Jr.
- Copperhead ("John Doe")
- Doctor Light (Arthur Light)
- Madame Rouge
- Maxwell Lord

Blackest Night: Superman #2 (November 2009)

- Psycho-Pirate (Roger Hayden) – Shown, but not named, in Blackest Night #3

Green Lantern (vol. 4) #46 (November 2009)

- Khufu
- Chay-Ara
- Abin Sur – Named in Blackest Night #2, but not shown in costume
- Arin Sur

Blackest Night: Titans #2 (November 2009)

- Terry Long
- Robert Long
- Hawk (Holly Granger)
- Pantha

Blackest Night: Batman #3 (December 2009)

- Tony Zucco
- Captain Boomerang (Digger Harkness) – Named in Blackest Night #1, but not shown in costume

Green Lantern Corps (vol. 2) #41 (December 2009)

- Ermey
- Ke'Haan – Shown, but not named, in Blackest Night #1
- Fentara Rrab
- Marata Rrab
- Santara Rrab

Blackest Night #4 (December 2009)

- Azrael (Jean-Paul Valley)
- Atom (Al Pratt) – Named in issue #1, shown in issue #4
- Jean Loring

Blackest Night: Titans #3 (December 2009)

- Baby Wildebeest – Shown, but not named, in issue #2

Green Lantern (vol. 4) #47 (December 2009)

- Laira – Named in issue #45, shown in issue #47
- Qull – Named in issue #45, shown in issue #47
- Roxeaume

Doom Patrol (vol. 5) #4 (January 2010)

- Celsius
- Tempest (Joshua Clay)
- Negative Woman
- Cliff Steele's original body

Booster Gold (vol. 2) #26 (January 2010)

- Blue Beetle (Ted Kord)

R.E.B.E.L.S. (vol. 2) #10 (January 2010)

- Stealth
- Harbinger

Adventure Comics (vol. 2) #4 (January 2010)

- Breach
- Bushido
- Charaxes
- Element Lad
- Geist
- Razorsharp
- Sun Boy

Outsiders (vol. 4) #24 (January 2010)

- Katana's dead husband and children:
  - Maseo Yamashiro
  - Yuki Yamashiro
  - Reiko Yamashiro

Blackest Night #5 (January 2010)

- Damage
- a clone of Bruce Wayne
- Animal Man
- Ice
- Wonder Woman
- Superman
- Superboy (Kon-El)
- Kid Flash (Bart Allen)
- Green Arrow
- Donna Troy

Justice League of America (vol. 2) #39 (January 2010)

- Vibe
- Zatara

Teen Titans (vol. 3) #77 (January 2010)

- Ravager (Grant Wilson)
- Ravager (Wade LaFarge)
- William Wintergreen
- Adeline Wilson

Blackest Night: The Flash #1 (February 2010)

- Reverse Flash
- Solovar

Justice League of America (vol. 2) #40 (February 2010)

- Steel (Hank Heywood III) – Shown, but not named, in issue #39

Blackest Night: JSA #1 (February 2010)

- Sandman (Wesley Dodds)
- Doctor Mid-Nite (Charles McNider)
- Mister Terrific (Terry Sloane)
- Johnny Quick

Green Lantern (vol. 4) #49 (February 2010)

- Driq

Suicide Squad #67 (March 2010)

- Fiddler
- Psi
- Ravan
- Atom (Adam Cray)

Weird Western Tales #71 (March 2010)

- Scalphunter
- Super-Chief
- Bat Lash
- Jonah Hex
- Quentin Turnbull

Catwoman (vol. 3) #83 (March 2010)

- Black Mask

The Power of Shazam! #48 (March 2010)

- Osiris (Amon Tomaz)
- Sobek

Secret Six (vol. 3) #17 (March 2010)

- Yasemine Soze

Blackest Night: The Flash #2 (March 2010)

- Mirror Master (Sam Scudder)
- Golden Glider
- Rainbow Raider
- Top
- Trickster (James Jesse)

Starman (vol. 2) #81 (March 2010)

- Starman (David Knight)

Green Lantern (vol. 4) #50 (March 2010)

- Aquababy
- Bug-Eyed Bandit
- Green Lantern (Hal Jordan)

The Question #37 (March 2010)

- Question (Victor Szasz)

Blackest Night: The Flash #3 (April 2010)

- Captain Boomerang (Owen Mercer)

Blackest Night #7 (April 2010)

- Air Wave (Harold Jordan)

Green Lantern Corps (vol. 2) #46 (May 2010)

- Alexandra DeWitt
- Anti-Monitor

Brightest Day #23 (April 2011)

- Swamp Thing

Green Lantern (vol. 5) #20 (May 2013)

- Hal Jordan

Dark Nights: Death Metal #5 (November 2020)

- Air Wave (Larry Jordan)
- Animal Man
- Anthro
- Atom (Al Pratt)
- Bat Lash
- Black Condor (Ryan Kendall)
- Blue Beetle (Dan Garrett)
- Claw the Unconquered
- Dan the Dyna-Mite
- Dove (Don Hall)
- Enemy Ace
- Fate (Jared Stevens)
- Hawk (Holly Granger)
- Hourman (Rex Tyler)
- Human Bomb (Roy Lincoln)
- Johnny Quick (Johnny Chambers)
- Johnny Quick (Earth-Three)
- Liberty Belle
- Red Bee (Richard Raleigh)
- Red Tornado (Ma Hunkel)
- Red Tornado (android)
- Sandman (Wesley Dodds)
- TNT
- Ultraman

Dark Nights: Death Metal #6 (December 2020)

- Blue Beetle (Ted Kord)
- The Batman Who Laughs' original body

== Oath ==
As with the other Lantern Corps, Black Hand devised an oath for the Black Lanterns:

The Blackest Night falls from the skies,
The darkness grows as all light dies,
We crave your hearts and your demise,
By my black hand, the dead shall rise!

— Black Lantern Corps oath

== Entity ==
While the Black Lantern Corps are powered by the black emptiness of space which represents death and therefore does not belong to the Emotional Spectrum, Black Hand is revealed to be the physical embodiment for these corps. During the climax of Blackest Night #8, Boston Brand tells the Corps' leaders that Black Hand is the "tether keeping Nekron within our world", and that as the avatar of Death he is also the only key to defeating the Black Lanterns permanently. Using the White Lantern power of Life, Hal Jordan commands "William Hand of Earth - Live", resurrecting Black Hand and removing him as the Black Lantern Corps' primary power source - which deals a crippling and eventually fatal blow to the Black Lanterns.

== The Book of the Black ==
Hidden within the vaults of Oa is a massive black tome containing the prophecy of the Blackest Night and the forbidden history of the Guardians of the Universe. After Scar's true death and the end of the Blackest Night, The Book of the Black is found by Ganthet, who notes it retains much forbidden knowledge within its pages. He decides to keep it a secret from the other Guardians and entrusts Guy Gardner with the secret.

The book is later taken by Krona who, after releasing Lyssa Drak from inside the book, takes it to the planet Ryut. There, after detecting the "New Guardians", it opens its pages to unveil the history of Krona. Drak traps Sinestro, Carol Ferris, Indigo-1, Atrocitus, Saint Walker, and Larfleeze inside the book. However, Sinestro prevents Drak from capturing Hal Jordan by causing a detonation using the combined energy of their rings.

The book returns to Black Hand's possession as it is sought by the Guardians of the Universe. After Black Hand is imprisoned in the Chamber of Shadows, the Book of Black is retrieved by Green Lantern B'dg. However, the book sucks B'dg and Simon Baz into it and returns to Black Hand.

The book's prophecy is revealed to be true when Hal Jordan transforms into a Black Lantern as a means to escape the Dead Zone. Jordan then summons Nekron in order to defeat the First Lantern, Volthoom. After his defeat, Jordan is released from being a Black Lantern and returns to life as Green Lantern once again.

== Powers and abilities ==
William Hand's black power ring

The Black Lanterns are corpses reanimated by black power rings, which are fueled by the power of death. Corpses reanimated by black power rings are reconstructed if damaged, keeping the body in working order at all times. Black power rings are capable of regenerating typically fatal injuries inflicted upon their users (including the complete dissolution). The rings generate black tendrils to "root" themselves into the corpses, making it impossible to remove them by physical force.

The first black power rings possess no charge, but each time a Black Lantern kills someone and removes their heart, .01 percent power is restored to every ring in the Corps. In Blackest Night #3, Indigo-1 solidifies this theme by explaining that those who rise feed off emotion. Even at low power levels, black rings enable their user to fly and create black energy constructs. They are also unaffected by magic. The bite of a Black Lantern induces a slow-acting necrosis that eventually turns the victim into a Black Lantern.

Superman displaying a wide spectrum of emotions (will, fear, rage, hope, and love).

Black Lanterns are able to read the emotions as colored auras that correlate to the emotional spectrum. Multiple emotions read as a multi-colored aura, while unreadable emotions come out as white. Furthermore, demonic and underworld dwellers (such as Etrigan the Demon) are read with a black aura, apparently unreadable due to their undead nature. A state of profound suspended animation is enough to fool a Black Lantern by making the target of suspended animation invisible to the senses of the Black Lantern. Emotionless hearts such as the Scarecrow's render their bearers equally invisible to the Black Lanterns. When facing beings with warped mental states, or otherwise addled minds (such as Bizarro), the correlation between the emotion detected and the actual color that the Black Lanterns see is inverted. In addition to the abilities granted to them by the rings, Black Lanterns retain any skills and superpowers they had in life.

=== Vulnerabilities ===
Black Lanterns are vulnerable to white light and a combination of green light with another Corps' light.

Doctor Light and Halo can completely destroy Black Lanterns using their light-based powers. Black Lanterns can be incapacitated by having their rings removed, or being injured faster than they can regenerate. Once a black power ring is destroyed, the corpse it animates becomes inert.

== Other versions ==
=== The New 52: Futures End ===
In the possible future of Futures End set five years later, Krona is reanimated as a Black Lantern and leads his Black Lanterns against Hal Jordan and Relic. Additionally, Sinestro obtains a Black Lantern Power Ring and uses it to reanimate his Corps as Black Lanterns.

== In other media ==
- Blackest Night-inspired Black Lantern skins for Batman, Hawkgirl, Superman, the Flash, and Doomsday appear in Injustice: Gods Among Us.
- A Black Lantern skin for Green Lantern appears in Injustice 2.
- A Black Lantern skin for Batman appears in Batman: Arkham Origins.
- A Black Lantern skin for Superman and Wonder Woman appear in MultiVersus.
