= Elongated Man =

Fictional character in DC Comics

- Elongated Man as depicted in Who's Who in the DC Universe #7 (September 1985). Art by Carmine Infantino.

Publication information
- Publisher: DC Comics
- First appearance: The Flash #112 (May 1960)
- Created by: John Broome (writer); Carmine Infantino (artist)

In-story information
- Alter ego: Randolph William "Ralph" Dibny
- Species: Metahuman
- Team affiliations: Justice League; Doom Patrol; Black Lantern Corps; Secret Six; Justice League Europe; Justice League Task Force
- Partnerships: Sue Dibny; The Flash; Plastic Man
- Abilities: As a metahuman: Elasticity; Superhuman durability, agility, and sense of smell; As a ghost: Non-corporeal form; Both: Deductive reasoning skills; Talented chemist

Elongated Man (Rudolph William "Ralph" Dibny) is a superhero appearing in American comic books published by DC Comics. He first appeared in The Flash #112 (May 1960).

Elongated Man / Ralph Dibny was portrayed by Hartley Sawyer in The CW's live-action Arrowverse television series The Flash. Additionally, Jeremy Piven, Sean Donnellan, and David Kaye have voiced the character in animation.

== Publication history ==
Elongated Man was created by writer John Broome and penciler Carmine Infantino, with significant input from editor Julius Schwartz, who wanted a new supporting character for the Flash. Schwartz has noted that Elongated Man was only created because he had not realized that Plastic Man was available due to DC obtaining the rights to him in 1956 alongside other Quality Comics properties. However, Infantino and inker Murphy Anderson stated that they never used Plastic Man as a reference.

In his 2000 autobiography, The Amazing World of Carmine Infantino, the artist wrote, "I really liked Elongated Man because it was comical and I enjoyed drawing comedy. It was also one of my favorite strips, because it was as close to animation as I could do in a comic book. I liked being able to test the limits of the comic book form and this strip allowed me to do that."

Elongated Man received a solo backup feature in Detective Comics, where he was redefined as a detective who loves odd mysteries and travels the United States in a convertible with his wife, searching for them. Sometimes they would travel the world or meet other DC superheroes like Batman, Green Lantern, the Atom and Zatanna. This feature became sporadic during the late '60s and throughout the '70s. However, in 1973, he became a member of the Justice League of America, and he is mostly seen in that title from 1973 to 1995.

== Fictional character biography ==
As a teenager, Ralph Dibny was fascinated by contortionists, or people who displayed feats of agility and suppleness. He learned that all of the body-benders he spoke with drank a popular soda called "Gingold". Ralph set to work learning chemistry and developed a super-concentrated extract of the rare "gingo" fruit of the Yucatán, which gave him his elasticity. In his first appearance, the Flash suspects Elongated Man is behind several crimes, but he helps capture the criminals, who reveal they used a helicopter to frame him.

Ralph Dibny was one of the earliest Silver Age DC heroes to reveal his secret identity to the public, and also one of the first to marry his love interest. After teaming up with several other superheroes like Batman, Green Lantern, the Atom, Zatanna and the Justice League, he became a member of the team. Eventually, his wife Sue Dibny became a member as well. The couple was also notable in having a stable, happy, and relatively trouble-free marriage—an anomaly in the soap operatic annals of superhero comic books.

=== Identity Crisis ===
Ralph Dibny played a central role in the events of Identity Crisis, with the main arc of the series revolving around Sue Dibny being murdered. The two's relationship, and the events that led to and resulted from her death, were used as primary narrative devices throughout the series for examining the respective personal relationships of other JLA and JSA members.

The effect of Sue's death on Ralph (compounded by the fact that Sue was apparently pregnant at the time of her death) would come to shape his character significantly in the events following Identity Crisis, eventually culminating at the end of 52.

Ralph and Sue appeared as members of the Justice League offshoot the Super Buddies in the miniseries Formerly Known as the Justice League and its sequel story arc "I Can't Believe It's Not The Justice League" published in JLA: Classified #4–9. The latter arc was produced before Identity Crisis, but published afterwards. A running joke in "I Can't Believe It's Not The Justice League" involves the possibility of Sue's pregnancy.

=== 52 ===
In the 2006 series 52, a grief-stricken Ralph Dibny is contemplating suicide when he is informed that Sue's gravestone has been vandalized with an inverted version of the Superman logo—the Kryptonian symbol for resurrection. He confronts Cassie Sandsmark, and she tells Ralph that she is in a cult that believes that Superboy can be resurrected. She steals Ralph's wedding ring after the cult members try to drown him.

During Week 18, other members of the Croatoan Society (Detective Chimp, Traci Thirteen, and Edogawa Sangaku) find Tim Trench dead with the helmet of Doctor Fate. Ralph comes to investigate and asks for help from the Shadowpact, Detective Chimp's other group. A voice from within the helm of Doctor Fate, unheard by the other members of the group, speaks to Ralph and promises to fulfill his desires if he makes certain sacrifices. Ralph travels to Doctor Fate's tower and attempts to use Fate's helmet to resurrect Sue, only for Neron and Felix Faust to appear, with Faust being revealed to have been posing as Nabu. Neron appears and kills Ralph, but realizes that he cast a binding spell that traps him and Faust in the tower.

At the end of 52, it is revealed that Ralph's magical, wish-granting gun (a souvenir from "the Anselmo Case", a reference to The Life Story of the Flash) worked. Ralph's last wish was to be reunited with his wife, even in death. Ralph and Sue are reunited in death as ghosts and resume their detective work, investigating a school where a paranormal phenomenon has just occurred.

=== Blackest Night ===
In the 2009 storyline Blackest Night, Ralph and Sue Dibny are temporarily resurrected as members of the Black Lantern Corps. attacking Hawkman and Hawkgirl; Ralph beats Hawkman with his mace before ripping out his heart. Next, they are seen in Gotham City with the Black Lantern Martian Manhunter, Hawkman, Hawkgirl, and Firestorm preparing to kill the Flash and Green Lantern. Ralph and Sue are both turned to ashes when the Indigo Tribe destroys their rings.

=== The New 52 ===
In The New 52 continuity reboot, Ralph Dibny is resurrected and depicted as a rogue member of the Secret Six under the alias of Damon Wells a.k.a. Big Shot. Dibny returns as Elongated Man in the fourth volume of Secret Six (2016).

== Powers and abilities ==
Elongated Man gained his abilities by drinking a refined version of a soft drink named Gingold that contains gingo fruit extract. It is revealed in Invasion! that Elongated Man is a metahuman and that the Gingold interacted with his latent meta-gene. An ordinary human would not develop such powers through ingesting the extract.

As his name suggests, Elongated Man can stretch his limbs and body to superhuman lengths and sizes. These stretching powers grant him heightened agility, enabling flexibility and coordination that is beyond the natural limits of the human body. He can contort his body into various positions and sizes impossible for ordinary humans, such as being entirely flat so that he can slip under a door, or using his fingers to pick conventional locks. He can also use it for disguise by changing the shape of his face, although this is painful and difficult for him. Ralph's physiology has greater physical limitations than Plastic Man; there is a limit to how far he can stretch his finite bodily mass, and he cannot open holes in his body as Plastic Man can.

Elongated Man's powers also greatly augment his durability. He is largely able to withstand corrosives, punctures and concussions without sustaining injury. It has been demonstrated that he is resistant to high velocities that would kill an ordinary person and that he is also more resistant to blasts from energy weapons that would kill ordinary humans.

In addition to his stretching abilities, Elongated Man is a professional detective and highly skilled in deductive reasoning. He is considered one of the most brilliant detectives in the DC Universe, comparable to Batman. He is a talented amateur chemist as well. A meta-side effect of his powers coupled with his detective skills is enhanced olfactory sense, allowing him to "smell" when something is "not right", or if a clue or mystery is at hand.

== Other versions ==
- An alternate universe version of Elongated Man appears in Kingdom Come.
- Elongated Man appears in JLA/Avengers #3.
- An alternate universe version of Elongated Man appears in The Dark Knight Strikes Again.
- An alternate universe version of Elongated Man from Earth-51 appears in Countdown to Final Crisis.
- Elongated Maniac, an evil alternate timeline version of Elongated Man, appears in The Flash #53.

== In other media ==
=== Television ===
Elongated Man (left) alongside Booster Gold (right) and Skeets (background) in Justice League Unlimited

- Elongated Man appears in Justice League Unlimited, voiced by Jeremy Piven. This version is a member of the Justice League.
- Elongated Man appears in Batman: The Brave and the Bold, voiced by Sean Donnellan. This version possesses shapeshifting abilities and a rivalry with Plastic Man.
- Elongated Man appears in Mad, voiced by Ralph Garman.
- Elongated Man appears in Young Justice, voiced by David Kaye. This version is a member of the Justice League.

Hartley Sawyer as Elongated Man in The Flash

- Ralph Dibny / Elongated Man appears in media set in the Arrowverse, primarily portrayed by Hartley Sawyer and an uncredited actor in the episode "Mother".
  - Dibny first appears in The Flash television series. While he was originally stated to be deceased due to Eobard Thawne's particle accelerator explosion in the first season, Dibny's death was undone following the destruction of the "Flashpoint" timeline in the third season before he makes his first appearance in the fourth season episode "Elongated Journey Into Night". This version was a police detective for the Central City Police Department until Barry Allen discovered that he had committed perjury by planting evidence. After Dibny was ousted from the police force, he became a private investigator specializing in infidelity cases. In the present, the Thinker manipulates Team Flash into exposing Dibny to dark matter, granting the latter his elastic powers. While helping him stabilize, Allen reconciles with Dibny, who eventually becomes the Elongated Man to help him defeat the Thinker and fight crime until he suffers grievous injuries while raiding a Black Hole facility and leaves with Sue Dearbon to travel the world and stop other criminal organizations like Black Hole.
  - Dibny appears in the crossover event "Crisis on Infinite Earths".

=== Film ===
- Extruded Man, an evil, alternate universe version of Elongated Man, makes a non-speaking appearance in Justice League: Crisis on Two Earths as a member of the Crime Syndicate.
- Elongated Man makes a cameo appearance in Teen Titans Go! To the Movies.
- Elongated Man makes a cameo appearance in Justice League: Crisis on Infinite Earths.

=== Video games ===
Elongated Man appears as a character summon in Scribblenauts Unmasked: A DC Comics Adventure.
