= Identity Crisis (DC Comics) =

Seven-issue comic book limited series published by DC Comics

- Cover to Identity Crisis #1 (August 2004), art by Michael Turner.

Publication information
- Publisher: DC Comics
- Schedule: Monthly
- Format: Limited series
- Genre: Superhero
- Publication date: August 2004 – February 2005
- No. of issues: 7
- Main character(s): Justice League; Green Arrow; Batman; Elongated Man; Doctor Light; Jean Loring

Creative team
- Created by: Brad Meltzer; Rags Morales; Michael Bair
- Written by: Brad Meltzer
- Artist: Michael Turner (cover)
- Penciller: Rags Morales
- Inker: Michael Bair
- Letterer: Ken Lopez
- Colorist: Alex Sinclair
- Editor: Mike Carlin

Collected editions
- Hardcover: ISBN 1-4012-0688-3
- Softcover: ISBN 1-4012-0458-9
- Absolute Identity Crisis: ISBN 9781401232580

Identity Crisis is a seven-issue comic book limited series published by DC Comics from June to December in 2004. It was created by writer Brad Meltzer and the artistic team of penciler Rags Morales and inker Michael Bair.

== Publication history ==
One of DC's top-selling series, the first issue was released in June 2004 and was ranked first in comic book sales for that period with pre-order sales of 163,111. The second issue saw a decline in sales and ranked third in comic book sales in July period with pre-order sales of 129,852. The story also adheres to the continuity changes introduced by Crisis on Infinite Earths and Zero Hour: Crisis in Time!, as heroine Wonder Woman was retconned out of the pre-Crisis JLA. In all further references to the JLA's pre-Crisis adventures, including its origin story and the Secret Society incident, Wonder Woman is replaced by Black Canary. Following Infinite Crisis, however, Wonder Woman is restored as a founding member.

One of the major plot threads — the breakdown of relationships within the Justice League of America — is examined in the storyline "Crisis of Conscience" in JLA #115-119 (August–December 2005). The mini-series is followed by the crossover event Infinite Crisis.

== Plot summary ==
While Elongated Man is on a stakeout, his wife Sue Dibny is murdered in their apartment, apparently dying of burns. The superhero community rallies to find the murderer, with Doctor Light being the prime suspect. Green Arrow reveals to the Flash (Wally West) and Green Lantern (Kyle Rayner) that Light once raped Sue Dibny in the JLA satellite headquarters. To ensure this could not happen again to Sue, another Justice League member or their loved ones, the members at that time — Atom (Ray Palmer), Black Canary, Hawkman, Green Lantern (Hal Jordan), and a reluctant Flash (Barry Allen) — voted to allow Zatanna to mind-wipe the villain and alter his personality to an ineffectual buffoon before again sending him to prison.

Further discussion reveals that a mind wipe was also done on at least one other occasion: when the Secret Society of Super Villains (Wizard, Floronic Man, Star Sapphire, Reverse-Flash, and Blockbuster) captured JLA members Superman, Batman, Flash, Hal Jordan, Zatanna and Black Canary and switched bodies with the heroes, allowing the villains to learn their secret identities. Although the heroes defeated the villains, Zatanna erased the villains' memories of the incident and their knowledge of the secret identities. Green Arrow's words also imply that they have done this on other occasions when their secret identities were threatened by magic or other means.

The heroes locate Light, who has hired the mercenary Deathstroke to protect him. During the ensuing battle, Light regains his memory and, enraged by the violation, escapes. Although questioned by Superman, Wally West continues to protect the heroes and their secrets, but Superman has learned them after eavesdropping on the conversations between him and Green Arrow with his enhanced hearing. Atom finds his estranged ex-wife, Jean Loring, hanging from a door, blindfolded and gagged, and revives her just in time, but she is unable to describe her attacker. A death threat is then sent to Superman's wife, Lois Lane. Captain Boomerang is hired by Calculator on behalf of the real killer to assassinate Jack Drake, father of Robin, Tim Drake. Jack finds a gun and a note warning him of the impending attempt on his life and fatally shoots Boomerang before being killed. Tim Drake comes upon the aftermath of this and is comforted by Batman, who confiscates the note before the authorities or the media can learn of its existence.

During the questioning of several villains by the heroes, former League member Firestorm is stabbed through the chest by Shadow Thief with Shining Knight's sword. Firestorm's nuclear powers reach critical mass and he detonates in the atmosphere.

Wally West questions Green Arrow again after accidentally seeing a snapshot of the battle on the Satellite in Light's mind, which reveals that Batman was also present. Green Arrow confesses that Batman had left immediately after the battle, but unexpectedly returned just as the mind wipe was taking place. He disapproved of this and nearly attacked the other heroes; he was magically restrained and his memory of the incident was repressed. Batman locates Calculator's hideout, but discovers the villain anticipated this and abandoned it. The autopsy of Sue Dibny's body by Doctor Mid-Nite and Mister Terrific, members of the Justice Society, reveals Dibny was killed by an infarction in her brain. A microscopic scan of Dibny's brain reveals small footprints as a clue to the infarction's cause.

Doctor Mid-Nite, Mister Terrific, and Batman realize that Dibny was murdered by someone who has access to Ray Palmer's shrinking technology. Almost simultaneously, Palmer learns that Loring is aware of the note sent to Jack Drake (which had been kept secret) and realizes she is the killer. Loring claims she did not mean to kill Dibny, and it was not her intention for Jack Drake to be killed, arguing that she sent the note and gun so he could protect himself. Loring states that she undertook the plan (including faking the attempt on her own life) in order to bring Ray back into her life. Realizing that Loring is insane, he has her committed to Arkham Asylum before being wracked by guilt over his former wife's actions then disappeared. Wally West is awkward in the presence of Batman, who is suspicious of his behavior.

=== Aftermath ===
The fallout of Identity Crisis directly sets up Infinite Crisis. In The Flash, the Rogues gather for Captain Boomerang's funeral, while Countdown to Infinite Crisis, The OMAC Project, and JLA track the rising tensions. Meanwhile, Countdown to Infinite Crisis reveals that Batman eventually remembered the Justice League's mind-wipe. This discovery fueled years of paranoia, driving him to build the Brother MK I surveillance satellite to monitor superhumans—a pivotal catalyst for the 2005–2006 crossover. It is revealed in that storyline that the Justice League's mind manipulation, Jean Loring's turn to villainy, and Sue Dibny's rape by Doctor Light were three of the many indirect changes affected by Alexander Luthor Jr. and Superboy-Prime when they caused overlaps of parallel timelines (Hypertime) from their pocket universe since after the events of Crisis on Infinite Earths.

== Awards ==
The miniseries was selected by the Young Adult Library Services Association (YALSA)'s 2007 recommended list of Great Graphic Novels for Teens.

== Reception ==
The overall crossover holds an average score of 7.3 out of 10 at the review aggregator website Comic Book Roundup, the lowest issue score going to #7, with 5.3, and the highest going to #1, with 8.7.

Chris Sims of ComicsAlliance called the series "the comic that ruined comics". Sims' colleague, Matt D. Wilson, did not concur with that exact assessment, but felt that the miniseries did a disservice to its protagonists: "Virtually every hero comes out of Identity Crisis looking like a jerk, a victim or a pariah". Wilson also stated that the series was "a destructive comic", as it had a negative influence on subsequent comics, such as Marvel's 2006-2007 miniseries Civil War, which similarly depicted heroes in what Wilson thought was a questionable light.

Greg Burgas of Comic Book Resources called the miniseries a "work of staggering genius". Burgas felt that the first six issues were interesting and bore great potential, but the story was not a good murder mystery, as it was ruined by the abrupt revelation of Jean Loring's guilt, which did not naturally follow the establishing of any evidence pointing to her throughout the course of the story, and that both her motive and the aftermath of her confession were implausible. Burgas also felt that Sue Dibny's rape was cheapened by the fact that Meltzer used it not to deal with how Sue dealt with the trauma, but how it affected her mostly male friends. Burgas also questioned Meltzer's stated motive of using the mindwipe to addressing the "goofiness" with which Doctor Light behaved in the comics that Meltzer read as a child, as Burgas felt that children's literature is often intended to convey such a tone, and does not require updating. Burgas also felt that by using established superheroes in a story intended to comment on the nature of heroism, Meltzer and DC did profound damage with their treatment of those characters, whose behavior in the story was decidedly not heroic.

Dominic Organ, writing for Comics Bulletin, was critical of the series' artwork, stating it was "incredibly spotty in places", inconsistent and "at times it is downright ugly". Organ, however, was impressed with some of Morales work, in particular the panel of Batman racing back to Tim's apartment, which prompted Organ to note: "The fear is palpable and all over Batman's face, a single panel that will stick with me for some time I am sure". Organ also praised the story, claiming that the stand-out was "the human tragedy of it all".

In 2009, ComicsAlliance named it one of the 15 Worst Comics of the Decade, stating it was "the embodiment of all the worst aspects of current super-hero comics".

== Collected editions ==
DC Comics reprinted the Identity Crisis mini-series in April 2005 with recolored covers. A hardcover collection (ISBN 1-4012-0688-3) was printed in September 2005, with bonus features including a commentary by Meltzer and Morales; the creative team citing favorite moments, and a look at Morales' sketchbook.

A paperback collection (ISBN 1-4012-0458-9) was released on August 16, 2006. The paperback collection ranked third in the top 100 graphic novels for the August 2006 period with pre-order sales of 7746.

An Absolute Edition of Identity Crisis was released on October 12, 2011.

== See also ==
- Heroes in Crisis
