= Blackest Night =

Limited DC comics crossover series

- Absolute Blackest Night's cover, art by Ivan Reis.
- Publisher: DC Comics
- Publication date: June 2009 – May 2010
- Genre: Superhero; Crossover
Title(s)
Blackest Night #0–8
Blackest Night: Batman #1–3
Blackest Night: Superman #1–3
Blackest Night: Tales Of The Corps #1–3
Blackest Night: The Flash #1-3
Blackest Night: Titans #1–3
Blackest Night: Wonder Woman #1-3
Green Lantern (vol. 4) #39-52
Green Lantern Corps (vol. 2) #29-47
The Titans (vol. 2) #15
- Main character(s): Hal Jordan; Carol Ferris; Barry Allen; William Hand; Thaal Sinestro; Atrocitus; Larfleeze; Saint Walker; Indigo-1; Ray Palmer; Jason Rusch; Mera; Nekron the rest of the DC Universe

Creative team
- Writer: Geoff Johns
- Penciller: Ivan Reis
- Hardcover: ISBN 1-4012-2693-0
- Paperback: ISBN 1401229530

"Blackest Night" is a 2009–10 American comic book crossover storyline published by DC Comics, consisting of an eponymous central miniseries, written by Geoff Johns and penciled by Ivan Reis, along with a number of tie-in issues of various DC monthly books, including Green Lantern and Green Lantern Corps. "Blackest Night" involves Nekron, a personified force of death who reanimates deceased superheroes and seeks to eliminate all life and emotion from the universe. Johns identified the series' central theme as emotion. Other tie-ins released included an audio drama from Darker Projects.

== Background ==
Teaser for Blackest Night from the last page of Green Lantern (vol. 4) #25. Art by Ethan Van Sciver.

The storyline was first teased at the conclusion of the "Sinestro Corps War", on the final page of Green Lantern (vol. 4) #25. As the war between the Green Lantern and Sinestro Corps reaches its climax, the four Green Lanterns of Earth—Hal Jordan, Guy Gardner, John Stewart, and Kyle Rayner—are told by the Guardians Ganthet and Sayd of the Blackest Night prophecy. According to the prophecy, the two existing Corps would be joined by five new ones, each driven by a specific emotion and empowered by a specific color of the emotional spectrum, leading to a "War of Light" that would subsequently destroy the universe. Johns says the prophecy has its origins in the story "Tygers" by Alan Moore, which touches on the rising up of the Guardians' enemies the Weaponers of Qward, Ranx the Sentient City, and the Children of the White Lobe, the destruction of the Green Lanterns, and shows Hal Jordan, Sinestro, and Mogo dying. Both Geoff Johns and Ethan Van Sciver said that "Blackest Night" is the third part of a Green Lantern event trilogy that began with Rebirth and continued with "Sinestro Corps War". In a December 2007 interview with IGN, Johns stated that he had the monthly Green Lantern book plotted up until issue #55. More details for the event were revealed in DC Universe #0, which depicted Black Hand discovering the black power battery on the planet Ryut.

Blackest Night #0 was released on May 2, 2009 — Free Comic Book Day — and portrays a series of events leading into Blackest Night #1. The standalone, self-titled miniseries consists of Blackest Night #0 and eight monthly issues. Tie-ins include issues of Green Lantern and Green Lantern Corps starting with issues #43 and #38, respectively, and nine three-issue limited series: Blackest Night: Tales of the Corps, Blackest Night: Superman, Blackest Night: Batman, Blackest Night: Titans, Blackest Night: Wonder Woman, Blackest Night: Flash, and Blackest Night: JSA. Van Sciver had planned to work on the opening book, but because of his work on The Flash: Rebirth miniseries he was not able to complete both effectively. Reis, Van Sciver, and Joe Prado created many of the designs for the storyline.

== Plot ==
=== Prelude ===
Green Lanterns Ash and Saarek find the Black Central Battery at a reportedly classified location within Sector 666. After touching the battery, Saarek reports that their presence has awakened something. The two are killed when two monstrous hands emerge from below them. In Green Lantern Corps, a field of asteroids in an unknown region of space is depicted with the colors of the spectrum in the background. The asteroids, which are apparently the remains of the planet Xanshi, are shattered and a large quantity of black power rings move through them.

=== Central storyline ===
In Gotham City, Black Hand removes Bruce Wayne's skull from his grave and carries it with him, and a Black Lantern power battery begins to charge. The Guardians of Oa observe the War of Light and realize that Ganthet and Sayd are correct, but are kept from intervening by Scar, who kills one and imprisons the rest. Thousands of black rings assault the Corps' crypt, creating a Black Lantern Corps. Hal Jordan and the newly revived Flash investigate Bruce's grave and are attacked by Black Lantern Martian Manhunter. On Oa, the Green Lanterns are met by all of the resurrected Lanterns, now reborn as Black Lanterns. Hawkgirl and Hawkman are killed by Black Lanterns Elongated Man and Sue Dibny and join the growing Black Corps.

The Atom is tricked into visiting Black Lantern Hawkman, and Deadman is the first to realize the dead superheroes are not their true selves when his physical body revives as a Black Lantern while he is still free. Aquaman and his Black Lantern family, including Tempest, attack Mera, who flees. A black ring strikes the Spectre, binding the spirit Aztar and reviving Crispus Allen as a Black Lantern. The black rings are unable to revive those who are at peace, such as former Dove Don Hall, even as his partner Hawk and his brother Hank rise. In Gotham, Hal Jordan and Barry Allen are confronted by several Black Lanterns, including Ronnie Raymond. Hal, the Atom and Flash battle the Black Lanterns when the Indigo Tribe appear and use their Indigo power with other rings to obliterate the Dibnys. Mera finds Firestorm (Jason Rusch) and Gehenna, who merge to create a new Firestorm. Indigo says that the Lantern Corps must unite to defeat the Black one. The Indigo Tribe depart with Hal and leave the other heroes to fight the invading Black Lanterns. Ronnie separates Jason and Gehenna, kills Gehenna, and absorbs Jason's consciousness. Black rings revive the villains buried below the Hall of Justice.

Mera and Flash flee the Black Lanterns and use Atom's powers to escape through a telephone line. Flash leaves and gives all the superheroes in the US the key to defeat the Black Lanterns—merging lights with a Green Ring—and the Atom, Mera and the Justice Society of America battle many Lanterns together. Jean Loring kills and causes Damage to revive as a Lantern, which fully empowers the Black Lantern power battery. Barry arrives in Coast City, where Scar has teleported with the Black Central Power Battery. Black Hand then summons Nekron, who revives the residents of Coast City. The JLA, Wally West, the Teen Titans, and Bart Allen fight the Coast City Black Lanterns. Hal and Lantern Corps members Carol Ferris, Sinestro, Atrocitus, Larfleeze, Saint Walker, Indigo-1, Ganthet, and Sayd return to Earth and attack Scar while she is attacking Wally West. Nekron has Batman's corpse—later revealed to be a clone—and sends rings to Superman, Wonder Woman, Superboy, Green Arrow, Kid Flash, Donna Troy, Ice, and Animal Man, previously killed and revived into Black Lantern members by Nekron as Hal and Barry try to outrace their rings.

Allen time-travels himself and Jordan two seconds into the future and disables their rings. Mera and the Atom arrive. John Stewart warns Hal that every Black Lantern in the universe is heading for Earth. Jordan says they need the entire seven Corps to unite to produce White Light. While they summon the seven Corps to Earth, Ganthet duplicates the seven colored rings present and deputizes non-Corps members Ganthet as Green, Barry Allen as Blue, Lex Luthor as Orange, Scarecrow as Yellow, Atom as Indigo, Mera as Red, and Wonder Woman as Violet. The Corps Leaders and deputies fight Nekron but cannot stop him, partly because Luthor is overwhelmed by the Orange light of avarice. John Stewart is trying to stop the horde of Black Lanterns when the combined Six Corps arrive to join and battle the Black Lanterns. In Coast City, Dove tries to reach the Black Lantern Battery but is forced to retreat as a being from within the battery tries to escape. Nekron kills a Guardian and uses his blood to cause a cocoon to emerge. Ganthet reveals that this is the Life Entity that triggered existence and that life began on Earth, not Oa, and that the Guardians upheld the lie to protect the Entity and justify their power. Nekron stabs the Entity, causing living beings across the universe to feel pain, and Sinestro surrenders to his anger at Abin Sur's death and stabs Ganthet, much to Hal Jordan's chagrin.

Hal realizes the Entity is like Parallax and Ion and needs a guide, and tries to merge with it, but is blocked by Sinestro, who is unhappy that Hal recently reused Parallax, who Sinestro feels he deserves. Sinestro demands the Entity's power, emerges and is told "Thaal Sinestro of Korugar. Destiny awaits". Sinestro is promptly killed by Nekron, but the White Ring revives him. Sinestro retaliates and kills Nekron, but Nekron's scythe is picked up by a Black Lantern human who transforms into Nekron and says "death cannot be stopped". Ganthet notes that Sinestro cannot properly control the Entity as it is being powered by his ego rather than his will to live. The united Lantern Corps attacks Nekron. Deadman possesses Guy Gardner and explains that Black Hand is Nekron's tether and that he must be revived to defeat Nekron. Nekron separates Sinestro from the Entity and Hal says that Nekron opened the door to death but it was the decision of the heroes to live. Hal merges with the Entity and transforms himself and the Black Lantern heroes into a White Lantern Corps, who restore Black Hand to life. This causes Black Hand to regurgitate a White Ring which revives the Anti-Monitor trapped in the Black Lantern Power Battery. Nekron briefly fights the Anti-Monitor and banishes him to the antimatter universe. Black Hand regurgitates a cluster of white rings that destroy Nekron. The rings bring only 12 Black Lanterns back to life: Maxwell Lord, Jade, Hawk, Captain Boomerang, Ronnie Raymond, Martian Manhunter, Aquaman, Hawkman, Hawkgirl, Osiris, Eobard Thawne, and Deadman.

Upon seeing Aquaman alive, Mera's love causes her ring to depart and shatter, sending her into cardiac arrest. Star Sapphire and Saint Walker join their powers together to restore her, and Aquaman and Mera share a joyful reunion. Hawkgirl recalls her past lives, removes her helmet to reveal that she is again Shiera Hall and embraces Hawkman. Superman expresses his happiness that J'onn has returned. Firestorm forcibly separates into Ronald Raymond and Jason, the latter is angry that Ronald has killed his girlfriend. As Mera comforts Jason, Ronald is confused and asks Atom what is happening and where Martin Stein is. Guy lets Lord, who is controlling his mind, escape. Jade kisses Kyle, unaware he is in love with fellow Green Lantern Soranik Natu. Osiris is confused and says he wants to go home. Superboy and Kid Flash, who only knows him by name, try to figure out who he is. After Professor Zoom flees into the past, Flash knocks out Captain Boomerang, while saying bloody hell to him. Barry notes that Ralph and Sue Dibny have not been revived. Deadman, the only one of the resurrected still wearing a White Ring, is stunned to realize he is alive and something is wrong. Larfleeze returns an unconscious Lex Luthor stripped of his ring, who briefly realizes that he has given something away, and demands that Sayd honors her debt to him.

Ganthet protests but Sayd tells him all is well and believes she can somehow help Larfleeze. Sayd says the future of the Lantern Corps must be discussed. Saint Walker notices that the Indigo Tribe and Black Hand are missing. On the Indigo home world, Black Hand is now a member and prisoner of the Indigo Tribe, and is chained to an indigo power staff. Hal and Barry realize that because Black Lantern Batman was a fake, Bruce Wayne is still alive somewhere. Barry wonders what became of the Entity; Hal says it is still out there, urging them all to move past the events of the Blackest Night. Elsewhere, on a distant road, a White Power Battery is found in a crater.

== Follow-up ==
Following the end of "Blackest Night", DC launched Brightest Day, a 25-issue bi-weekly comic book written by Geoff Johns and Peter Tomasi. Also, Action Comics features a story arc in which Lex Luthor starts a universal quest to locate the power sources of the Black Lantern Corps after being infused with the Orange Light of Avarice.

== Titles involved ==
Title	Issue(s)	Writer(s)	Artist(s)	Notes
Preludes
Green Lantern	#39-42	Geoff Johns	Rafael Albuquerque, Eddy Barrows, Doug Mahnke, Philip Tan	"Agent Orange" storyline
Green Lantern Corps	#29-38	Peter J. Tomasi	Patrick Gleason	"Sins of the Star Sapphire" and "Emerald Eclipse" storylines
Solomon Grundy	#7	Scott Kolins		
Titans	#15	J.T. Krul	Jose Luis	
Main series
Blackest Night	#0-8	Geoff Johns	Ivan Reis	
"War of Light" tie-in
Green Lantern	#43-52	Geoff Johns	Doug Mahnke	"War of Light" storyline
Green Lantern Corps	#39-46	Peter J. Tomasi	Patrick Gleason	"War of Light" storyline
Other tie-ins
Blackest Night: Batman	#1-3	Peter J. Tomasi	Adrian Syaf	"Blackest Night" tie-in miniseries
Blackest Night: The Flash	#1-3	Geoff Johns	Scott Kolins	"Blackest Night" tie-in miniseries
Blackest Night: JSA	#1-3	Tony Bedard, James Robinson	Eddy Barrows, Marcos Marz, Eduardo Pansica	"Blackest Night" tie-in miniseries
Blackest Night: Superman	#1-3	James Robinson	Eddy Barrows, Allan Goldman	"Blackest Night" tie-in miniseries
Blackest Night: Tales of the Corps	#1-3	Geoff Johns, Peter J. Tomasi	Eddy Barrows, Gene Ha, Tom Mandrake, Mike Mayhew, Rag Morales, Jerry Ordway, Chris Samnee	"Blackest Night" tie-in miniseries
Blackest Night: Titans	#1-3	J.T. Krul	Ed Benes	"Blackest Night" tie-in miniseries
Blackest Night: Wonder Woman	#1-3	Greg Rucka	Eduardo Pansica, Nicola Scott	"Blackest Night" tie-in miniseries
Untold Tales of Blackest Night	#1	Geoff Johns, J.T. Krul, Jeremy Love, Adam Schlagman, Peter J. Tomasi, Ethan Van Sciver	Ed Benes, Brett Booth, Jason Fabok, Patrick Gleason, Ivan Reis, Ethan Van Sciver	"Blackest Night" one-shot issue
Adventure Comics	#4-5, 7	Tony Bedard, Sterling Gates, Geoff Johns	Travis Moore, Jerry Ordway	
The Atom and Hawkman	#46	Geoff Johns	Fernando Pasarin, Ryan Sook	
Booster Gold	#26-27	Dan Jurgens	Dan Jurgens, Mike Norton, Norman Rapmund	
Catwoman	#83	Tony Bedard	Luciana Del Negro, Fabrizio Fiorentino, Marcos Marz, Ibraim Roberson	
Doom Patrol	#4-5	Keith Giffen	Justiniano	
Green Arrow and Black Canary	#30	J.T. Krul	Diogenes Neves	
Justice League of America	#39-40	James Robinson	Mark Bagley	
Outsiders	#24-25	Peter J. Tomasi	Derec Donovan, Fernando Pasarin	
Phantom Stranger	#42	Peter J. Tomasi	Adrian Syaf	
The Power of Shazam!	#48	Eric Wallace	Don Kramer	
The Question	#37	Dennis O'Neil, Greg Rucka	Denys Cowan	
R.E.B.E.L.S.	#10-11	Tony Bedard	Andy Clarke, Claude St. Aubin	
Starman	#81	James Robinson	Fernando Dagnino, Bill Sienkiewicz	
Suicide Squad	#67	John Ostrander, Gail Simone	J. Calafiore	"Danse Macabre" storyline
Secret Six	#17-18	John Ostrander, Gail Simone	J. Calafiore	"Danse Macabre" storyline
Superman/Batman	#66-67	Scott Kolins		
Teen Titans	#77-78	J.T. Krul	Joe Bennett	
Weird Western Tales	#71	Dan Didio	Renato Arlem	
Action Comics	#890	Paul Cornell	Pete Woods	"Blackest Night Aftermath"
Behind-the-scenes
Blackest Night: Director's Cut	#1			

== Collected editions ==
The series and its tie-in issues have been collected into a number of volumes:

- Blackest Night (collects Blackest Night #0–8, 304 pages, hardcover, July 2010, ISBN 1-4012-2693-0; paperback, July 2011, ISBN 1-4012-2953-0)
- Blackest Night (collects Blackest Night #0–8, and Blackest Night Directors Cut #1, trade paperback, 269 pages.)
- Blackest Night: Green Lantern (collects Green Lantern (vol. 4) #43–52, 272 pages, hardcover, July 2010, ISBN 1-4012-2786-4; paperback, July 2011, ISBN 1-4012-2952-2)
- Blackest Night: Green Lantern Corps (collects Green Lantern Corps (vol. 2) #39–47, 264 pages, hardcover, July 2010, ISBN 1-4012-2788-0; paperback, July 2011, ISBN 1-4012-2805-4)
- Blackest Night: Tales of the Corps (collects Tales of the Corps #1–3 and stories from Green Lantern (vol. 4) #49 and Adventure Comics (vol. 2) #4–5, 176 pages, hardcover, July 2010, ISBN 1-4012-2790-2; paperback, August 2011, ISBN 1-4012-2807-0)
- Blackest Night: Black Lantern Corps Volume One (collects Blackest Night: Batman #1–3, Blackest Night: Superman #1–3, and Blackest Night: Titans #1–3; 256 pages, hardcover, July 2010, ISBN 1-4012-2784-8; paperback, July 2011, ISBN 1-4012-2804-6)
- Blackest Night: Black Lantern Corps Volume Two (collects Blackest Night: Wonder Woman #1–3, Blackest Night: JSA #1–3 and Blackest Night: The Flash #1–3, 240 pages, hardcover, July 2010, ISBN 1-4012-2785-6; paperback, July 2011, ISBN 1-4012-2803-8)
- Blackest Night: Rise of the Black Lanterns (collects The Atom and Hawkman #46, The Question #37, Phantom Stranger (vol. 2) #42, Starman (vol. 2) #81, The Power of Shazam! #48, Catwoman (vol. 3) #83, Weird Western Tales #71, Green Arrow (vol. 4) #30, and Adventure Comics (vol. 2) #7; 256 pages, hardcover, July 2010, ISBN 1-4012-2789-9; paperback, August 2011, ISBN 1-4012-2806-2)
- Absolute Blackest Night (collects Blackest Night #0-8, select pages from DC Universe #0 and Green Lantern (vol. 4) #44-48, 50–52). Bonus material includes: Character sketches and designs, Blackest Night #1 script and commentary on the Blackest Night series from several members of the creative team. 576 pages; hardcover. Release date: July 16, 2013. ISBN 978-1401240738.
- Blackest Night Saga (DC Essential Edition): Collects Blackest Night #0-8. 344 pages; paperback. Release date: February 12, 2019. ISBN 978-1401290917.
- Blackest Night Omnibus (10th Anniversary): Collects Adventure Comics #4, 5, 7; Blackest Night #0-8; Blackest Night: Batman #1-3; Blackest Night: The Flash #1-3; Blackest Night: JSA #1-3; Blackest Night: Superman #1-3; Blackest Night: Tales of the Corps #1-3; Blackest Night: Titans #1-3; Blackest Night: Wonder Woman #1-3; Catwoman (vol. 3) #83; Green Arrow (vol. 4) #30; Green Lantern (vol. 4) #43-53; Green Lantern Corps (vol. 2) #39-47; Phantom Stranger (vol. 2) #42; Starman (vol. 2) #81; Suicide Squad #67; The Atom and Hawkman #46; The Power of Shazam! #48; The Question #37; Untold Tales of Blackest Night #1 and Weird Western Tales #71. 1664 pages; hardcover. Release date: June 11, 2019. ISBN 978-1401291198.

== Reception ==
The series has received generally positive reviews. Comic Book Resources gave the first and third issues in the series 5 out of 5 stars, and the second received 4.5 stars. IGN also reviewed the series favorably, and rated the first three individual issues between 8.7 and 9.3 out of a possible 10.

== Alternate versions ==
In Tales from the Dark Multiverse: Blackest Night, an alternate outcome to Blackest Night is depicted where Sinestro's ego refused to release his control of the Entity, with the result that all life was destroyed by the Black Lanterns. By the time of the storyline, a few weeks after Nekron's attack, the only living beings in the universe are Sinestro, Lobo, Dove, and Mister Miracle, and Sinestro is only half-alive because the Entity keeps him going even as he wears a Black ring at the same time. Mister Miracle is able to find a means of channelling the Source Wall through Dove to recreate the universe, but when Nekron - now possessing Darkseid - reveals that this will literally remake the universe over, Mister Miracle kills Dove as he cannot bring himself to erase Barda from existence, which causes Lobo to kill Mister Miracle in retribution for killing the only thing in the universe he considered "pure". As a last resort, Sinestro uses Lobo to channel the life energy into the universe, but this only results in the creation of a more twisted form of 'life' that follows Lobo's example by trying to destroy all remnants of the old existence and their own enemies, leaving Sinestro fighting to escape this world even as higher entities keep him contained so that he cannot contaminate other realities.

== In other media ==
- There are skin pack DLCs available for Injustice: Gods Among Us, featuring Blackest Night - inspired skins for Superman, Batman, the Flash, Hawkgirl, Aquaman and Doomsday. The Injustice mobile platform version features Blackest Night skins for Superman, Batman, Flash, Hawkgirl, Doomsday and the Martian Manhunter.
- A downloadable Blackest Night Batman skin appears in Batman: Arkham Origins.
- The storyline is featured in several DC Universe Online episodes, which introduces several of the Lantern Corps members to the game, many of which can be seen in an instanced overworld called "Metropolis Battlezone" and several other missions, that finally leads to a battle against Nekron and Black Hand in an eight-player instance of Metropolis at night.
- Purchasable "Black Lantern" skins for Superman and Wonder Woman were added to MultiVersus in the 1.04 update in October 2022.
- The premise of Blackest Night serves as the single-player campaign mode for the turn-based mobile role-playing game DC Legends. Players must battle against DC characters that were turned into Black Lanterns, with the final boss being Nekron himself.
- The Flash showrunner Eric Wallace planned to make a Blackest Night adaptation for an Arrowverse crossover event for the show's ninth season, hence why he teased John Diggle finding a mysterious box in the show's eighth season to set-up such storyline. However, Wallace saw himself forced to scrap his plans once The CW decided not to renew The Flash for a tenth season, forcing him to change his plans to wrap-up the show with the ninth season.

== See also ==
- Brightest Day
- Black Lantern Corps
- Publication history of DC Comics crossover events
