= Sue Dibny =

DC Comics character

- Sue Dibny. Art by Carmine Infantino.

Publication information
- Publisher: DC Comics
- First appearance: The Flash #119 (March 1961)
- Created by: John Broome (writer); Carmine Infantino (artist)

In-story information
- Alter ego: Susan Dearbon Dibny
- Team affiliations: Justice League; Super Buddies; Black Lantern Corps; Justice League Europe; Justice League International
- Partnerships: Elongated Man
- Supporting character of: Flash; Starman
- Abilities: As a ghost: Invisibility; Intangibility; Flight; Possession

Susan Dibny is a fictional character from DC Comics associated with the Elongated Man. Created by John Broome and Carmine Infantino, the character first appeared in Flash vol. 1 #119 (March 1961). In 2004, Sue Dibny became a flashpoint for discussions of women in comics following the events of Identity Crisis, in which she is murdered by Jean Loring and revealed to have been raped by Doctor Light a decade before.

While her Post-Crisis iteration remained dead, a new living iteration of Sue was introduced into DC’s Earth-Prime continuity, DC’s new main continuity after the Flashpoint event and New 52 reboot, and is still alive as of 2025. As with her past primary iterations, The Earth Prime version of Sue is married to the Earth Prime version of Ralph Dibny (like Post Crisis Sue, Post-Crisis Ralph Dibny had also died but had a new living iteration introduced in the Earth-Prime continuity).

Sue Dearbon appeared in the Arrowverse television series The Flash, portrayed by Natalie Dreyfuss.

== Fictional character biography ==
Sue Dibny is a socialite from Westchester County, New York, who is married to Ralph Dibny, the Elongated Man. She has at times worked for the Justice League as an administrator. Ralph and Sue share a loving relationship. They met when Ralph crashed her debutante ball, using the pretense of jewel thieves to catch a glimpse of Sue. What followed was a whirlwind romance. Sue and Ralph married a short time later with Barry Allen serving as the best man. What followed was a life of adventures and super-heroics, as Sue stuck by Ralph's side as he traveled around the globe as part of the Justice League. This led to the various dangers associated with the lifestyle, including her near-death at the tentacles of an alien parasite and being kidnapped by Sonar to become his consort. Through it all, Sue and Ralph stuck together, even when the going got tough, eventually settling in Opal City.

=== Super Buddies ===
Sue is a member of the Super Buddies team made up of former members of the Justice League. As she has no superpowers, she spends most of the time at the Super Buddies headquarters arguing with team founder Maxwell Lord.

=== Death ===
The 2004 event Identity Crisis begins with Sue's death at the hands of Jean Loring while she was expecting a child. Attempting to reunite with her husband Ray Palmer, Loring had used his equipment to try to create a threat to the families of other superheroes in an attempt to prompt Ray to come back to her. Although Loring had not intended for Sue to be seriously hurt, by traveling down the phone line to 'jump' into Sue's brain, she unintentionally caused an aneurysm that killed Sue. Loring then panicked and severely burned Sue's body to mask the true cause of her death. Over the course of the series, it is revealed that in the past Sue was raped by Doctor Light. In an attempt to prevent him from harming members of other superheroes' families, Justice League member Zatanna attempted to magically rehabilitate Light, which accidentally resulted in her damaging Light's brain. Light is the prime suspect in Sue's murder until Doctor Mid-Nite and Mister Terrific conduct an autopsy and confirm that he is not responsible. A casual comment Jean made to Ray prompted him to realize the truth, resulting in him sending Jean to Arkham Asylum and disappearing from the Justice League.

During the 52 series, a Kryptonian cult attempts to revive Sue from the dead. They attract the attention of a now depowered Ralph Dibny by spray-painting the Kryptonian word for resurrection (an inverted Superman logo) on her tombstone. Ralph and a team of heroes infiltrate the resurrection ceremony. Convinced that the ceremony is a hoax, Ralph and the others attack the temple, which subsequently catches on fire. However, Ralph is convinced that the resurrection is not a hoax when a seemingly animated straw representation of Sue crawls towards Ralph uttering his name. Although this straw version of Sue is destroyed in the fire, Ralph survives and vows to complete Sue's resurrection. A later issue revealed that it was Felix Faust who animated the dummy with his powers, and Ralph was aware of Faust's deception but pretends to believe that it was really his wife in order to get close to the villain and his master, Neron. After Ralph Dibny is killed by Neron, he reunites with Sue in the afterlife, having cast a spell that ensured they would remain together.

In Blackest Night #0, Black Hand is seen in a graveyard approaching the graves of Sue Dibny and her husband Ralph. Their bodies are resurrected as members of the Black Lantern Corps and kill Hawkgirl and Hawkman by ripping their hearts out. Sue, Ralph, and the Hawks later join Firestorm and Martian Manhunter in attacking the Flash and Green Lantern. The fight is interrupted by the arrival of the Indigo Tribe, who use their powers to remove Sue and Ralph's rings and kill them.

Ralph and Sue are resurrected following The New 52 continuity reboot. A disguised Ralph joins the Secret Six at the behest of the Riddler, who is holding Sue hostage.

== Powers and abilities ==
While alive, Sue Dibny possessed no superhuman abilities. However, she showed herself to be a quick thinker, a decent detective (though not on her husband's level), and multi-lingual (native English, as well as French, Spanish, Italian, and Portuguese). Her appearances as a ghost have shown her with paranormal abilities, including invisibility, intangibility, and possession.

== Other versions ==
- In the 1997 Tangent Comics one-shot The Flash, Sue Dearborn appeared as a minor character working as a reporter for All Access.
- In Superman: American Alien, Sue Dearborn encounters a nineteen-year-old Clark Kent while with Oliver Queen, mistakenly believing that he is Bruce Wayne. She introduces him to Vic Zsasz and his unnamed wife.

== In other media ==
Sue Dearbon appears in The Flash, portrayed by Natalie Dreyfuss. She is initially alluded to in the fifth season finale before Ralph Dibny works to find her in the sixth season. He eventually finds her in Central City, wherein she manipulates him into helping her seek revenge on the crime syndicate Black Hole for extorting her parents. Upon realizing this, Dibny convinces Dearbon to give up her vendetta, only for the latter to be framed by Eva McCulloch for the death of Black Hole's leader, Joseph Carver. In the seventh season, Dearbon and Dibny succeed in clearing her name before leaving to dismantle other Black Hole cells, though Dearbon would later return to help the Flash and his allies.

== Analysis ==
In critical analyses of sexual violence in comics, Sue Dibny’s assault in Identity Crisis has been cited as an example of a “true victim” portrayal: she is blinded by Doctor Light, physically restrained, and resists while begging him to stop. Ralph Dibny’s recollection (“She told me she fought… I hope she fought”) introduces an element of doubt that echoes the real-world rape myth equating failure to resist with consent. Commentators note that the narrative still carries a blameful undertone by emphasizing that Sue was alone on the Satellite simply because she was bored and wanted to look at the stars—framing her as the unprotected woman out at an inappropriate time and implying partial responsibility.
