= Life Entity =

The Life Entity

Publication information
- Publisher: DC Comics
- First appearance: Blackest Night #7 (April 2010)
- Created by: Geoff Johns; Ivan Reis

In-story information
- Species: Emotional Embodiment
- Place of origin: Earth
- Team affiliations: The 7 Emotional Corps; White Lantern Corps
- Notable aliases: The Entity of Life, The Entity
- Abilities: Manipulation and creation of life

The Life Entity is a fictional creature, a physical embodiment of all life within the DC Universe. Long ago starting all life from the planet Earth, it went on to create the seven entities of the Emotional Electromagnetic Spectrum, and was hidden in a dimensional tear within the Earth by the Guardians of the Universe when they discovered its existence to preserve it from exploitation and possible harm.

== Fictional character biography ==
The Life Entity formed as the embodiment of life at the beginning of the universe. After driving away the forces of the Black, the Entity was weakened, with its power being divided into the seven colors that led to the development of the emotional spectrum and the birth of the emotional entities: Ion, Parallax, the Predator, Ophidian, the Butcher, Adara, and Proselyte. The Life Entity sealed itself inside Earth to regain its power, but retained a link to all life: any harm to it would fall upon the living.

In their early history, the Guardians of the Universe harness the green light of willpower and discover the Entity. To protect the Entity from being harmed, the Oans hide its existence and falsely claim that all life began on the planet Oa.

=== Blackest Night ===
The Entity remained concealed for billions of years until the Blackest Night, when Nekron rose to purge existence of all life. To aid him in his task, he resurrected the dead and formed the Black Lantern Corps. Nekron later manifests in Coast City, where the Black Lantern Central Power Battery is created. Nekron and Black Hand kill one of the Guardians of the Universe and place his organs on the ground, creating a connection to the place where the Entity is held.

Shortly afterwards, the Entity's sleeping form manifests and Nekron stabs it with his scythe, with its pain being felt by beings across the universe. The Flash notes that the Entity is not fighting back and Hal Jordan concludes that the Entity needs a host to empower it. Before the Entity can take Jordan as a host, Sinestro does so instead and becomes the first White Lantern. Sinestro severs the connection of the Black Lanterns to their power rings, only to be wounded by Nekron and separated from the Entity. Jordan claims the Entity for himself and disperses its power over a number of Earth's super heroes, thus forming the White Lantern Corps. With their new powers, the White Lanterns sever Nekron's link to the mortal world and fully resurrect several of the Black Lanterns to protect the world from future threats. The Entity disappears after the battle.
