= Green Lantern in other media =

Adaptations of Green Lantern in other media
- Original source: Comics published by DC Comics
- First appearance: All-American Comics #16

Films and television
- Film(s): Justice League: The New Frontier (2008); Green Lantern: First Flight (2009); Green Lantern: Emerald Knights (2011); Green Lantern (2011); The Lego Movie (2014); The Lego Batman Movie (2017); The Lego Movie 2: The Second Part (2019); Green Lantern: Beware My Power (2022); Superman (2025)
- Television show(s): The Superman/Aquaman Hour of Adventure (1967–1968); Aquaman (1967–1970); Super Friends (1977–1985); Justice League (2001); Justice League Unlimited (2004); Green Lantern: The Animated Series (2012–2013); Lanterns (2026)

Games
- Video game(s): Justice League Heroes (2006); Green Lantern: Rise of the Manhunters (2011)

The many incarnations of the DC Comics superhero Green Lantern have appeared in numerous media over the years.

Dedicated media featuring Green Lantern include the 2011 live action film Green Lantern and its tie-in video game Green Lantern: Rise of the Manhunters, the 2012-2013 animated television series Green Lantern: The Animated Series, and the animated films Green Lantern: First Flight in 2009, Green Lantern: Emerald Knights in 2011, and Green Lantern: Beware My Power in 2022. A live-action television series Lanterns, as well as the animated series My Adventures with Green Lantern, are currently in development.

== Novels/audios ==
Green Lantern: Sleepers is a trilogy created by Christopher J. Priest and written by Mike Baron, Michael Ahn, and Priest. Each book focuses on a different Green Lantern—Kyle Rayner, Alan Scott, and Hal Jordan, respectively.

Pocket has published a series of Justice League of America novels. Of these, Exterminators by Christopher Golden includes Jordan as part of the team, and Hero's Quest by Dennis O'Neil is a solo Green Lantern story.

All of these stories have been made into full-cast dramatizations released by GraphicAudio.

== Television ==
=== Animation ===
- The Hal Jordan incarnation of Green Lantern appears in The Superman/Aquaman Hour of Adventure, voiced by Gerald Mohr.
- The Hal Jordan incarnation of Green Lantern appears in the Super Friends franchise, voiced by Michael Rye.
- The Green Lantern Corps appear in series set in the DC Animated Universe (DCAU), consisting of John Stewart (voiced by Phil LaMarr), Kyle Rayner (voiced by Michael P. Greco in Superman: The Animated Series and Will Friedle in Justice League), Kai-Ro (voiced by Lauren Tom), and various minor Lanterns. Additionally, an alternate universe variant of Hal Jordan appears in the Justice League Unlimited episode "The Once and Future Thing, Part 2: Time, Warped", voiced by Adam Baldwin, while Scott Mason / Green Guardsman, an original character based on Alan Scott, appears in the Justice League episode "Legends", voiced by William Katt.
- The Green Lantern Corps appear in the Duck Dodgers episode "The Green Loontern", consisting of Hal Jordan (voiced by Kevin Smith), Kilowog (voiced by John DiMaggio), Katma Tui (voiced by Tara Strong), Boodikka (voiced by Grey DeLisle), Ch'p (voiced by Frank Welker), and Sinestro (voiced by John de Lancie). Additionally, John Stewart, Arisia Rrab, G'nort, and Guy Gardner make non-speaking cameo appearances.
- The Hal Jordan incarnation of Green Lantern appears in The Batman, voiced by Dermot Mulroney.
- The Green Lantern Corps appear in Batman: The Brave and the Bold, consisting of Hal Jordan (voiced by Loren Lester), Guy Gardner (voiced by James Arnold Taylor), G'nort (voiced by Alexander Polinsky), Kilowog (voiced by Diedrich Bader), and various minor Lanterns. Additionally, Alan Scott appears in the episode "Crisis: 22,300 Miles Above Earth!", voiced by Corey Burton.
- The Green Lantern Corps appear in Young Justice, consisting of Hal Jordan, John Stewart (voiced by Kevin Michael Richardson), Guy Gardner (voiced by Troy Baker), Kilowog (voiced by Richardson), Soranik Natu (voiced by Vanessa Marshall), Tomar-Re, and Tomar-Tu (both voiced by Dee Bradley Baker). Additionally, Alan Scott appears in a flashback in the episode "Humanity".
- The Green Lantern Corps appear in Green Lantern: The Animated Series, consisting of Hal Jordan (voiced by Josh Keaton), Guy Gardner (voiced by Diedrich Bader), Kilowog (voiced by Kevin Michael Richardson), Salaak (voiced by Tom Kenny), Iolande (voiced by Tara Strong), Mogo (voiced by Kevin Michael Richardson), Tomar-Re (voiced by Jeff Bennett), and several minor Lanterns.
- The Hal Jordan and Kyle Rayner incarnations of Green Lantern appear in the Mad segment "That's What Super Friends Are For".
- The Hal Jordan and Jessica Cruz incarnations of Green Lantern appear in DC Super Hero Girls (2015), respectively voiced by Josh Keaton and Cristina Milizia.
- The Hal Jordan and Jessica Cruz incarnations of Green Lantern appear in DC Super Hero Girls (2019), respectively voiced by Jason Spisak and Myrna Velasco.
- The Hal Jordan incarnation of Green Lantern appears in Justice League Action, voiced again by Josh Keaton.
- The John Stewart incarnation of Green Lantern makes non-speaking cameo appearances in Harley Quinn.
- Jessica Cruz appears in the My Adventures with Superman episode "Mobile Suit Toyman", voiced by Auliʻi Cravalho.
- The Jessica Cruz and Kyle Rayner incarnations of Green Lantern will appear in My Adventures with Green Lantern, voiced again by Auliʻi Cravalho.

=== Live-action ===
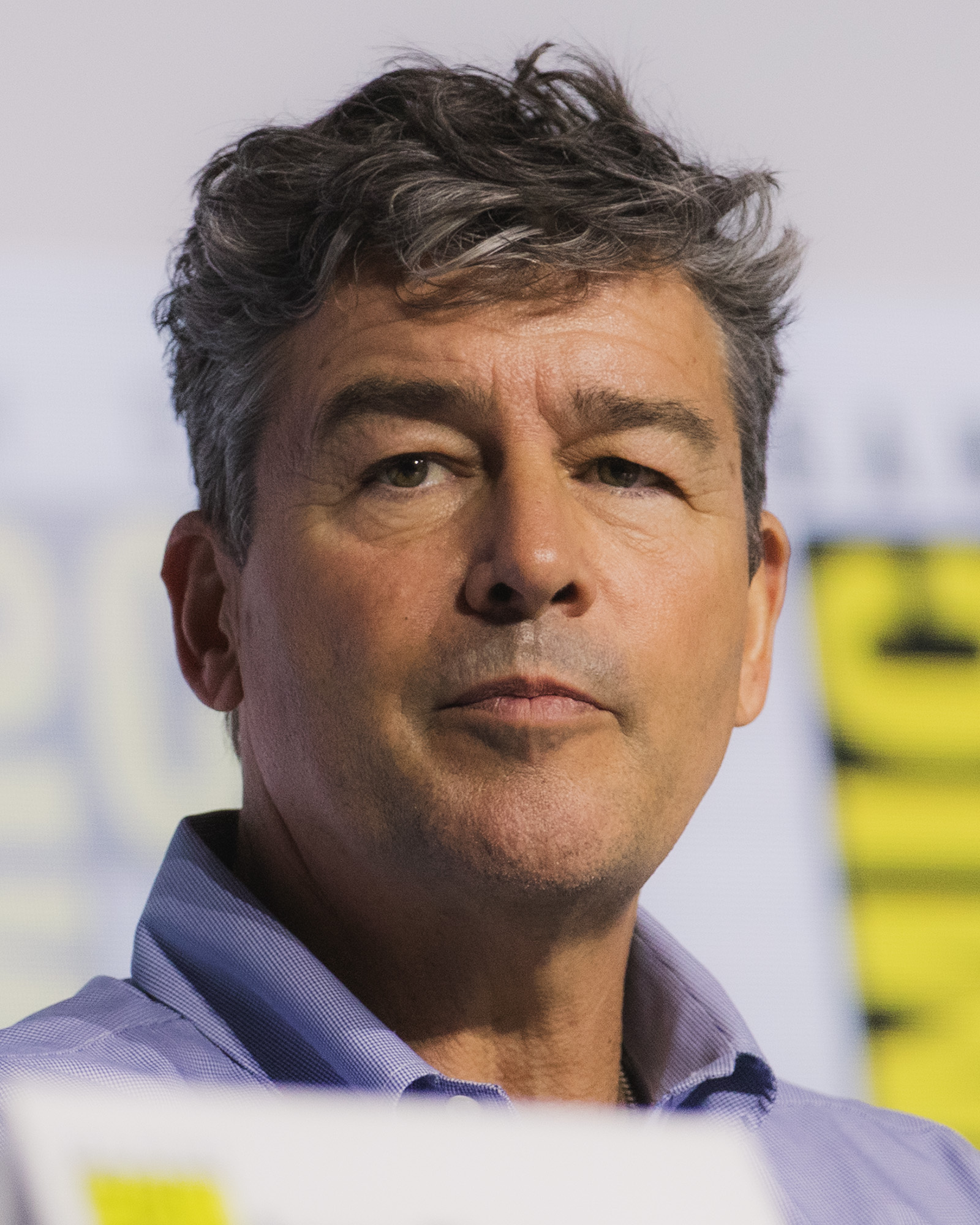
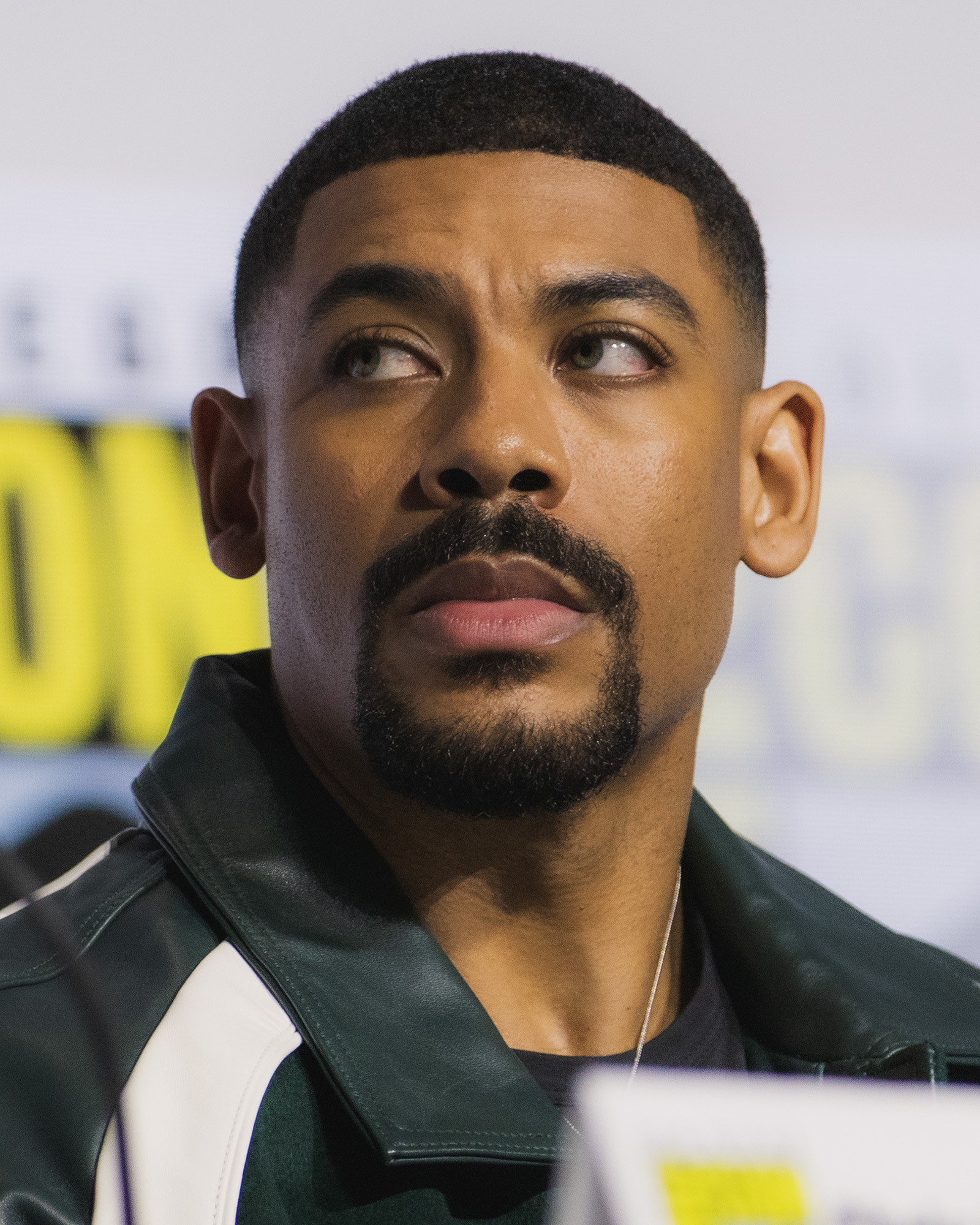
Kyle Chandler and Aaron Pierre portray Green Lantern members Hal Jordan and John Stewart respectively in the DCU series Lanterns.
- The Hal Jordan incarnation of Green Lantern appears in Legends of the Superheroes, portrayed by Howard Murphy.
- The Guy Gardner incarnation of Green Lantern appears in Justice League of America, portrayed by Matthew Settle.
- The Alan Scott incarnation of Green Lantern appears in the Smallville episode "Absolute Justice", portrayed by Doug Pinton.
- The Green Lantern Corps are referenced in the Arrowverse.
- The Alan Scott incarnation of Green Lantern is mentioned and pictured in Stargirl as a member of the Justice Society. His daughter Jade also appears, portrayed by Ysa Penarejo.
- The Hal Jordan, John Stewart and Guy Gardner incarnations of Green Lantern appear in the HBO series Lanterns, portrayed by Kyle Chandler, Aaron Pierre, and Nathan Fillion respectively.

== Films ==
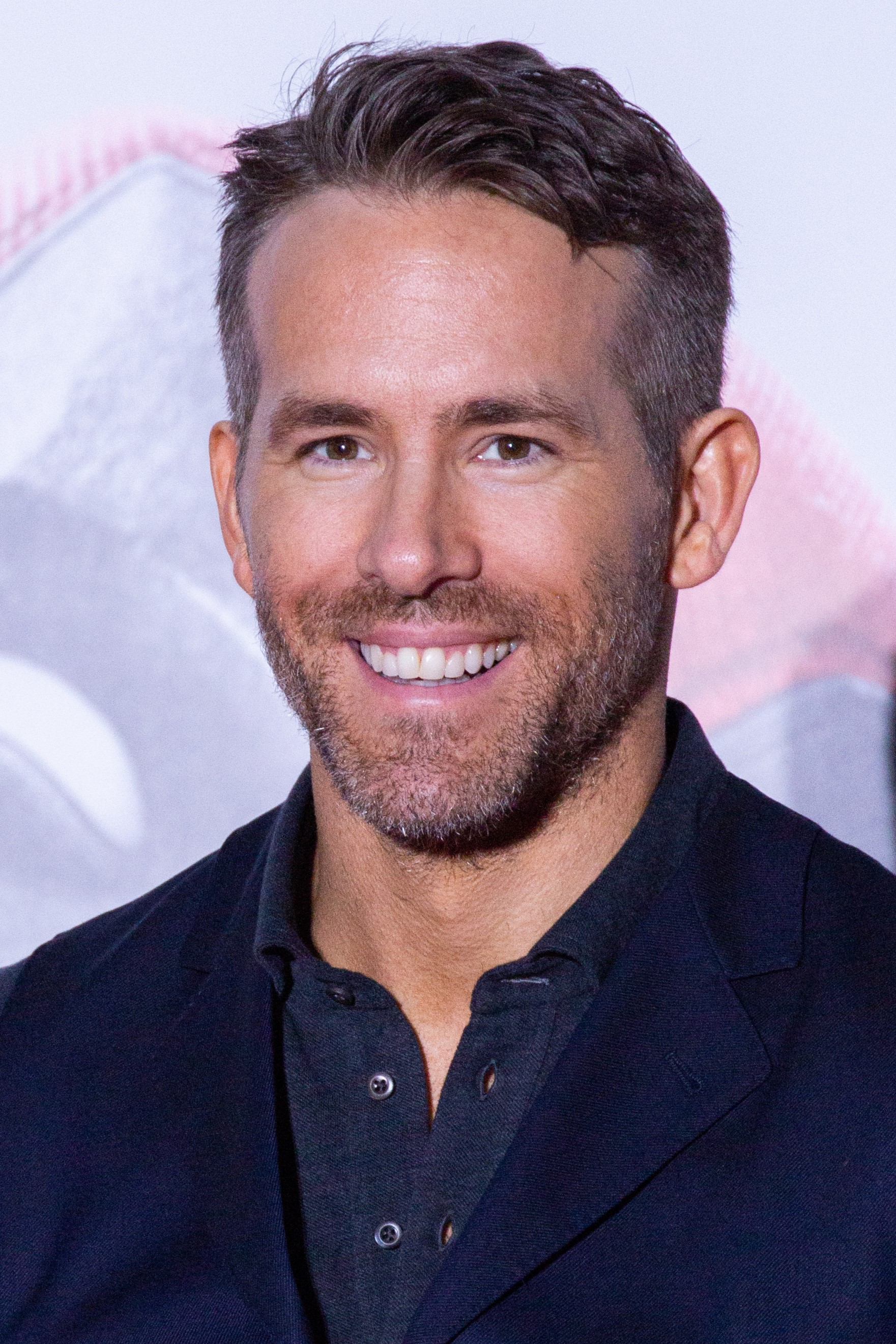
Ryan Reynolds plays Hal Jordan in the film Green Lantern

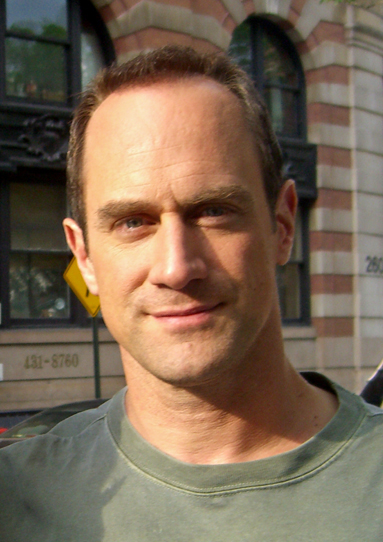
Christopher Meloni voices Hal Jordan in Green Lantern: First Flight

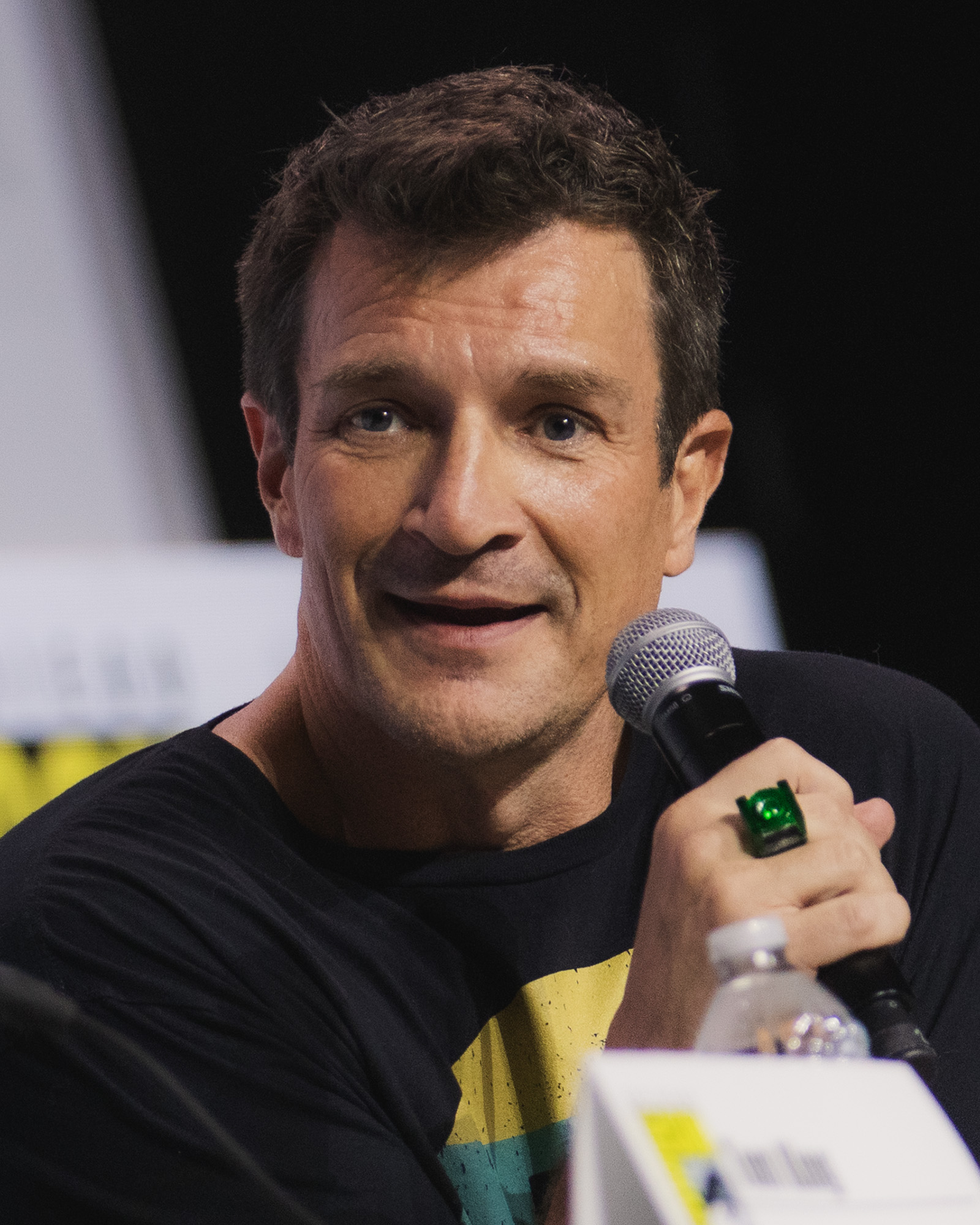
Nathan Fillion voices Hal Jordan in Green Lantern: Emerald Knights as well as multiple DCAMU films. He also portrays Guy Gardner in various DCU projects.

=== Live action ===
==== Green Lantern ====
A live-action film titled Green Lantern starring Ryan Reynolds as Hal Jordan and directed by Martin Campbell was released on June 17, 2011. The film, being the character's first theatrical appearance, featured an origin story. The movie was neither well-received nor financially successful. Some of the film's most criticized aspects were the CGI elements that featured heavily.

==== DC Extended Universe ====
===== Justice League (2017) =====
Green Lantern Yalan Gur appears in a flashback in Justice League (2017), during the sequence which depicts humans, Amazonians, Atlanteans, the Olympians and the Lantern fighting Steppenwolf and his army of Parademons. He conjures a giant hammer with his power ring to fight the armies of Apokolips, but is overpowered and killed by Steppenwolf. The power ring then leaves his finger and flies away to find a new worthy individual to inherit it.

===== Zack Snyder's Justice League (2021) =====
Director Zack Snyder confirmed on Christmas 2020, that in Zack Snyder's Justice League, Green Lantern is part of his Justice League and has confirmed Hal Jordan is "at another location" in response to a fan asking if Hal is at S.T.A.R. Labs or somewhere else, confirming Jordan's existence in his universe and possibly in the film. Kevin Smith confirmed in January 2019 that a scene was filmed in Principal Photography featuring a Green Lantern and Alfred at Bruce Wayne's lake house but was later reshot by Snyder with Superman. The latter version was included in the home release of Justice League as part of a deleted scene segment titled The Return of Superman. He also confirmed Green Lanterns and the Green Lantern Corps played a significant part in Snyder's planned Justice League trilogy and presumably the then planned Green Lantern Corps film, (see below), as before September 2017, it was planned to take place in Snyder's universe and meant to tie in to Snyder's planned Justice League trilogy. However, the failure of Justice League (2017) and success of Wonder Woman caused Warner Bros. to shift away from Snyder's vision. A scrapped credits scene featuring Kilowog and Tomar-Re visiting Bruce Wayne at his lake house in night was cut in post production in 2017. All of this was to set up Justice League sequels and the then planned Green Lantern Corps movie. Snyder revealed he had planned for John Stewart to appear at the end of the film along with another Green Lantern, likely Kilowog and Tomar-Re. He said he filmed half of it back in 2016 during principal photography in London, with green lights shining on Alfred/Bruce. He intended to complete it as part of pick-ups shooting later in post-production but left the movie. When his movie got green lit, he finished shooting it with a theater actor Wayne T. Carr at Snyder's house on the driveway. The scene was later repurposed then to have both Stewart and Martian Manhunter talking to Bruce. However, Warner Bros. did not like the idea of Snyder introducing John Stewart as they have their own ideas for him elsewhere not connected to Snyder's universe. Thus, a compromise was made and Snyder repurposed the scene to feature Martian Manhunter, revealed earlier in the film to be General Calvin Swanwick, first introduced in Man of Steel, played by Harry Lennix. He visits Bruce Wayne at his lake house which was shot in late October 2020 during additional photography for the film. Snyder also revealed he had an early idea for an additional Lantern in that scene to be played by Ryan Reynolds, but scrapped it early on and never spoke to him about it.

===== Green Lantern Corps =====
A rebooted adaptation of the Green Lantern titled Green Lantern Corps was first announced as part of the DC Extended Universe in 2016. It was intended to be the tenth installment of the universe. The movie would have reportedly featured numerous Green Lanterns, with Hal Jordan or John Stewart from earth as central characters. It was later stated that both of those characters, along with the Green Lantern Corps may appear in Justice League sequels. In January 2017, Deadline reported that David S. Goyer and Justin Rhodes were hired as co-screenwriters, with the story written by Goyer and Geoff Johns. Goyer will also produce the film with Johns and Jon Berg. In June 2018, Geoff Johns was hired to re-write the script, in addition to producing, with Johns stating that the script will draw inspiration from his New 52 run of the character. In July 2019, Christopher McQuarrie said that he had sent a proposal to Warner Bros. a year prior, which had ties to the Man of Steel sequel, but he moved onto other projects due to what he perceived as no progress on developing the film. By November 2019, Johns was expected to deliver his script by the end of that year. As of 2021, it seems the movie was reworked into the recently announced Green Lantern HBO Max series. On April 1, 2021, The Hollywood Reporter revealed the film is in development again at Warner Bros. John Stewart will be featured in it as confirmed by Zack Snyder who said he was forced by Warner Bros. to remove his own in-universe version of the character from his movie.

==== DC Universe ====
- Guy Gardner appears in the DC Universe (DCU) film Superman, portrayed by Nathan Fillion.
- Guy Gardner and John Stewart are set to appear in the DCU film Man of Tomorrow (2027), with Nathan Fillion and Aaron Pierre reprising their respective roles.

=== Animation ===
==== Green Lantern animated films ====
- Hal Jordan is the main protagonist in Green Lantern: First Flight, voiced by Christopher Meloni. There were plans to make a sequel to this film, but nothing came of it due to poor DVD sales.
- Hal Jordan appears in Green Lantern: Emerald Knights, voiced by Nathan Fillion.
- John Stewart is the main protagonist in Green Lantern: Beware My Power, voiced by Aldis Hodge. Hal Jordan also appears, with Nolan North reprising his role.

==== Character in ensemble ====
- Hal Jordan is one of the main characters in Justice League: The New Frontier, voiced by David Boreanaz.
- Hal Jordan appears in Justice League: Crisis on Two Earths, voiced by Nolan North.
- Hal Jordan appears as a member of the Justice League in Justice League: Doom, with Nathan Fillion reprising his role.
- Nathan Fillion reprises his role as Hal Jordan in Justice League: The Flashpoint Paradox.
- Hal Jordan appears in Lego Batman: The Movie – DC Super Heroes Unite, an adaptation of the video game of the same name, with Cam Clarke reprising his role.
- Hal Jordan appears in Justice League: War, voiced by Justin Kirk.
- Hal Jordan appears in The Lego Movie, voiced by Jonah Hill. In the film, there's a recurring joke where Green Lantern would find and try to help Superman, making the latter a little awkward. Superman even tries to commit suicide by asking for Kryptonite when he is put next to Green Lantern in the Torture Room.
- Hal Jordan appears in Justice League: Throne of Atlantis, with Nathan Fillion reprising his role.
- Guy Gardner appears in Lego DC Comics Super Heroes: Justice League vs. Bizarro League, with Diedrich Bader reprising his role.
- Hal Jordan appears in Lego DC Comics Super Heroes: Justice League – Attack of the Legion of Doom, with Josh Keaton reprising his role.
- Hal Jordan appears in Lego DC Comics Super Heroes: Justice League – Cosmic Clash, voiced again by Josh Keaton.
- John Stewart appears in Justice League Dark, voiced by Roger Cross.
- Hal Jordan appears as a member of the Justice League in The Lego Batman Movie, with Jonah Hill reprising his role.
- John Stewart appears as a member of the Justice League in Teen Titans Go! To the Movies, voiced by Lil Yachty.
- Jessica Cruz appears in the animated film Lego DC Comics Super Heroes: Aquaman – Rage of Atlantis, with Cristina Milizia reprising her role.
- Hal Jordan appears in The Death of Superman, with Nathan Fillion reprising his role.
- Hal Jordan appears in Reign of the Supermen, once again voiced by Nathan Fillion.
- Hal Jordan appears in The Lego Movie 2: The Second Part, with Jonah Hill reprising his role.
- Jessica Cruz appears in Justice League vs. the Fatal Five, voiced by Diane Guerrero. Hal Jordan, John Stewart, Guy Gardner, and Kyle Rayner appear as holograms.
- The Green Lantern Corps appear in Justice League Dark: Apokolips War.
- John Stewart makes a non-speaking cameo appearance in Space Jam: A New Legacy.
- The Green Lanterns appear in Teen Titans Go! & DC Super Hero Girls: Mayhem in the Multiverse, where they are voiced again by Jason Spisak, Phil LaMarr and Myrna Velasco respectively.
- Jessica Cruz and Chip appear in DC League of Super-Pets, voiced by Dascha Polanco and Diego Luna, respectively.
- Jessica Cruz appears in Justice League x RWBY: Super Heroes & Huntsmen, voiced by Jeannie Tirado.

== Video games ==
- The Emerald Twilight storyline was to be adapted into a video game for the Mega Drive and Super NES by Ocean Software. The game would have allowed players to assume the role of Kyle Rayner and take on the threat of Hal Jordan as Parallax. The game was cancelled.
- John Stewart appears as a playable character in Justice League Heroes. Hal Jordan and Kyle Rayner are featured as unlockable characters.
- John Stewart appears as a playable character in Justice League: Heroes United.
- Hal Jordan appears as a playable character in Mortal Kombat vs. DC Universe. His special moves include a fist-shaped projectile, hammer constructs to smash foes, a large hand that slams foes to the ground, and a brick wall shield that absorbs projectiles. His heroic brutalities involve encasing the opponent in a force bubble and then rapidly contracting it, and crushing the opponent between two large hammers. In the game's trailer, Green Lantern is seen being beaten by Sonya Blade using martial arts and super strength before Captain Marvel saves him, and is seen defending a weakened Superman from Liu Kang (his counterpart from the Mortal Kombat universe) in the Fortress of Solitude. Later, Sonya fights Green Lantern again and Green Lantern defeats Sonya. He is also seen speaking with the Guardians of the Universe and being confronted by Lex Luthor, who is consumed by the "combat rage" and asserts that he deserves to have Hal's power ring.
- Guy Gardner appears as a playable character in the Wii version of the Batman: The Brave and the Bold video game, with Hal Jordan being playable in the DS version. Arisia Rrab and Kilowog make appearances as well. Also, a statue of Alan Scott appears in the Gotham City level of the Wii version.
- Hal Jordan appears in Green Lantern: Rise of the Manhunters, a video game based on the Green Lantern film.
- Alan Scott, Hal Jordan, Guy Gardner, John Stewart, Kyle Rayner and Kilowog appear in DC Universe Online. John Stewart fights alongside the heroes against Sinestro and the Sinestro Corps, Hal Jordan and Green Arrow fight alongside the heroes against Eclipso and an out-of-control Spectre, Kilowog is the target of a bounty mission for villains and Kyle Rayner is a boss in the Coast City instance along with Amon Sur and Atrocitus. The player also helps Hal Jordan and Kilowog, along with other unnamed Green Lanterns in the S.T.A.R. Labs instance, which also includes Sinestro and Arkillo. The Corps is heavily involved in the entire "War of the Light" saga spread over several episodes, culminating in the final showdown against Nekron.
- Hal Jordan appears as a playable character in Lego Batman 2: DC Super Heroes.
- Hal Jordan appears as a playable character in Injustice: Gods Among Us, as both a Green Lantern and a Yellow Lantern. Yellow Lantern Hal Jordan is from a parallel Earth and fights for Superman's Regime, after becoming a member of the Sinestro Corps. Green Lantern Hal Jordan defeats both his counterpart and Sinestro on occasion and in the end they are forced to stand down when the heroic Superman defeats his villainous counterpart and his regime. Yellow Lantern and Sinestro are taken to Oa by Green Lantern to stand trial for their crimes. John Stewart and later a mobile version including Jessica Cruz are also featured as alternate skins.
- Hal Jordan appears as a playable character in The Lego Movie Videogame.
- Hal Jordan, Guy Gardner, John Stewart, Kyle Rayner, Kilowog and Duck Dodgers appear as playable characters in Lego Batman 3: Beyond Gotham.
- Hal Jordan and two parallel Earth versions of him appear as playable characters in the multiplayer battle arena game Infinite Crisis, voiced by Adam Baldwin (Prime), Nolan North (Atomic), and JB Blanc (Arcane).
- Hal Jordan appears as a playable character in Injustice 2. John Stewart is also featured as an alternate skin. In the game story, after being rehabilitated by the Guardians, Hal Jordan was able to reclaim his post as Green Lantern of Sector 2814. Now as an ally of Batman in the protection of the world, Hal is willing to prove to everyone (including himself) that he deserves a second chance. In his ending, after bringing Brainiac to Oa to stand trial, Hal learns that Sinestro has escaped imprisonment. Since the Green Lanterns are too weak from battling Superman's regime for a frontal assault, Hal agrees to go undercover as a Yellow Lantern, hoping that his willpower will be able to withstand the ring's addiction.
- Hal Jordan, John Stewart, Jessica Cruz, Simon Baz and B'Dg are playable characters in Lego DC Super-Villains. However, Hal Jordan as Green Lantern got a DLC version based on his appearance in The Lego Movie 2: The Second Part.

== Fine arts ==
In the fine arts, and starting with the pop art period and on a continuing basis since the 1960s, the character has been "appropriated" by multiple visual artists and incorporated into contemporary artwork, most notably by Mel Ramos, Dulce Pinzon, Lesya Guseva, Nate Gowdy, and others.
