= Ke'Haan =

- Ke'Haan as depicted in Green Lantern (vol. 4) #13 (August 2006). Art by Ivan Reis (penciler), Oclair Albert (inker), and Moose Baumann (colorist).

Publication information
- Publisher: DC Comics
- First appearance: Green Lantern (vol. 3) #49 (February 1994)
- Created by: Ron Marz; Fred Haynes

In-story information
- Alter ego: Ke'Haan
- Species: Varvan
- Place of origin: Varva
- Team affiliations: Green Lantern Corps; Black Lantern Corps
- Abilities: Green and Black Lantern Power Rings

Ke'Haan is a fictional character featured in comic books published by DC Comics. A member of the Green Lantern Corps, he first appeared in Green Lantern (vol. 3) #49 (February 1994).

== Fictional character biography ==
Ke'Haan of Varva is the second in command to Green Lantern trainer Kilowog and the protector of sector 786. Together, he and Kilowog are the top trainers for newly appointed Green Lantern Corps recruits. Their tough training is noted for producing some of the toughest Lanterns found in the corps. After Kentor Omoto, the Green Lantern of Sector 112, is killed, Ke'Haan takes in Kentor's daughter Laira, who becomes his prized pupil.

When the entity Parallax corrupts fellow Green Lantern Hal Jordan, the Guardians dispatch Ke'Haan and Laira to stop him from reaching Oa. The two are outmatched as Jordan tears through them and seemingly kills Ke'Haan.

Believed dead after his battle with Hal Jordan, Ke'Haan, along with fellow Green Lanterns Graf Toren, Laira, Kreon, Boodikka, and Tomar-Tu, is captured by the Manhunters and taken to Sector 3601 to be used as energy cells for the planet Biot. During this time, he was succeeded as Green Lantern of his sector by Turytt. Guy Gardner and Hal Jordan, now freed from Parallax's influence, free Ke'Haan and the Lanterns.

When Parallax (Kyle Rayner) brings Hal Jordan to Qward, the entire Sinestro Corps attack him. Amon Sur told Hal it was ironic that he was going to die despised and abandoned by the Corps. Ke'Haan arrives on the scene with his fellow Lost Lanterns and takes Boodikka, Laira, and Hannu to find Ion. Instead, they find the Anti-Monitor, who kills Ke'Haan.

Ke'Haan is one of the many fallen Lanterns to be resurrected as a Black Lantern during the "Blackest Night" event. He is one of the many Black Lanterns who stand against the living Green Lanterns on Oa. During the conflict, he manages to impale Guy Gardner through the leg. His corpse is destroyed.

== In other media ==
- Ke'Haan makes non-speaking cameo appearances in Green Lantern: The Animated Series.
- Ke'Haan appears as a character summon in Scribblenauts Unmasked: A DC Comics Adventure.
