= Turytt =

- Turytt as depicted in Green Lantern (vol. 4) #11 (June 2006). Art by Ivan Reis (penciler), Oclair Albert (inker), Moose Baumann (colorist), and Rob Leigh (letterer).

Publication information
- Publisher: DC Comics
- First appearance: Green Lantern (vol. 4) #11 (June 2006)
- Created by: Geoff Johns; Ivan Reis

In-story information
- Team affiliations: Green Lantern Corps
- Abilities: Green Lantern Power Ring

Turytt is a fictional character featured in comic books published by DC Comics. He first appeared in Green Lantern (vol. 4) #11 (June 2006).

== Fictional character biography ==
Turytt is a very tall, well-muscled humanoid alien with red skin, a blonde ponytail down the center of his head, and protruding jagged horns on his abdomen, arms and head. Other distinguishing features include claws on each hand and superhuman strength. Turytt bears a vague resemblance to the Superman villain Doomsday.

Very little is known of the past of the Green Lantern who has come to be known as Turytt. What is known, however, is that he hails from the space sector 786 and is the successor of Ke'Haan of Varva. Turytt takes his duties as Green Lantern very seriously and he has shown to have been greatly hurt by the betrayal of the Corps by Hal Jordan and especially the death of his predecessor. As a Green Lantern, his first duty was to inform Ke'Haan's family of his death. Sharing their grief, he vowed to put an end to the one who had been responsible for his death.

=== Rookie Green Lantern of sector 786 ===
While Turytt is not as experienced in the use of his ring as Guy Gardner, John Stewart, or Hal Jordan, he is one of the few rookies to have almost completed his training as he sports the Green Lantern emblem on his belt as opposed to an empty spot like those still in training.

His "rookie" fans then proceed to attack the senior Lanterns despite the fact that he has not recovered. Along with the rest of the rookies, he is reprimanded by Kilowog and Salaak who give him and his 'groupies' seventy demerits for their behavior.

Turytt is seen during the Sinestro Corps War, and during the debate over Laira's killing of Amon Sur. He also holds a vigil for all the fallen Corpsmen the night after Sinestro is defeated. Turytt blames Jordan for Ke'Haan's death at the hands of the Anti-Monitor, despite the fact that there was nothing he could have done about it.

When Krona places Parallax in the Central Power Battery, Turytt is among the many Lanterns brainwashed into serving him. In the aftermath of Krona's defeat, Turytt targets Kyle Rayner, and declaring that human Lanterns have been nothing but trouble for the Corps. Several other Lanterns agree with him, but not Tomar-Tu, who transports Kyle to safety.

== In other media ==
Turytt appears as a character summon in Scribblenauts Unmasked: A DC Comics Adventure.

== See also ==
The Lost Lanterns

- Laira
- Kreon
- Boodikka
- Tomar-Tu
- Ke'Haan
- Jack T. Chance
