= Green Lantern (disambiguation) =

Green Lantern refers to a group of superheroes in DC Comics.

Green Lantern may also refer to:

- Green Lantern (comic book)
- Green Lantern (film), a 2011 American live-action superhero film directed by Martin Campbell
  - Green Lantern (soundtrack), a soundtrack album from the 2011 film
  - Green Lantern: Rise of the Manhunters, a video game tie-in to the 2011 film
- Green Lantern: The Animated Series, a CGI television series that aired on Cartoon Network
- Green Lantern Corps, a fictional intergalactic military/police force appearing in comics published by DC Comics
- Green Lantern (Six Flags Great Adventure), a defunct stand-up roller coaster at Six Flags Great Adventure in Jackson Township, New Jersey, United States
- Green Lantern: First Flight (Six Flags Magic Mountain), a defunct 4th Dimension roller coaster at Six Flags Magic Mountain in Valencia, California, United States
- Green Lantern Coaster, the steepest roller coaster in the Southern Hemisphere, located at Warner Bros. Movie World on the Gold Coast, Queensland, Australia
- DJ Green Lantern, a hip-hop DJ and music producer, born James D'Agostino

== See also ==
- Green Lantern in other media
