= DC Nation =

American television programming block (2012–14)

- Original DC Nation logo
- Network: Cartoon Network
- Launched: March 3, 2012
- Closed: March 30, 2014
- Country of origin: United States

DC Nation was a programming block of DC Comics series and shorts that aired on American television channel Cartoon Network on Saturday morning. It premiered on March 3, 2012, and was produced by Warner Bros. Animation. Some of the shows in DC Nation include Green Lantern: The Animated Series and Young Justice (with Beware the Batman in 2013). Cartoon Network announced that they revived the Teen Titans animated series as Teen Titans Go!, based on the New Teen Titans shorts, in 2013; episodes began airing in April of that year.

== Former programming ==
Previous series include Young Justice and Green Lantern: The Animated Series. The final lineup includes Teen Titans Go! and Beware the Batman

Title	Aired	Ended
Young Justice	March 3, 2012	April 21, 2013
Green Lantern: The Animated Series	March 3, 2012	June 2, 2013
Teen Titans Go!	April 27, 2013	March 30, 2014
Beware the Batman	July 13, 2013	October 20, 2013

== Theme songs ==
- Skrillex – "Rock N Roll"
- Richardson & Macklin & Tom Ford – "Acid Cube"

== Shorts ==
Many short films produced by Sam Register air on the show; they are mainly comedy. In the first season, these included New Teen Titans, S.B.F.F. and DC's World's Funnest from Aardman Studios. Season two saw two additional short series: JL Animals and Amethyst: Princess of Gemworld.

== Controversy ==
On October 13, 2012, two weeks after it had returned from a summer break and ten hours before it was supposed to air, the block was pulled from the schedule by Cartoon Network; an hour of DreamWorks Dragons was shown on Saturday with Johnny Test on Sunday. DC Nation workers were told about the action by fans. Later that day, Cartoon Network and DC Nation's Facebook and Twitter profiles stated that the block had been put on hiatus and would resume airing in January 2013.

An online petition was started that day to bring back the block by the end of the year and reached its first goal of 10,000 signatures on October 15. The Green Lantern episode "Steam Lantern" and the Young Justice episode "Before the Dawn", episodes that had been scheduled to air, were released to the iTunes Store and became the top two television programs of that day. They also became available on Amazon.com on October 16. No official explanation has been given for the extended hiatus. As of October 13, all DC Nation consisted of Teen Titans Go! repeats and various shorts, as well as being pre-empted at least four times in 2014 for special programming (such as the HD remaster of Pokémon: The First Movie). Young Justice, Green Lantern and Beware the Batman were all canceled with little or no information given to the fans other than a rumored report that the DC parent company did not feel these shows' lack of humor appealed to kids anymore.

By 2015, the block's discontinuation was apparent with the shorts airing exclusively during Teen Titans Go! premiere episodes on Wednesday nights, until they were not.
