= Tomar-Tu =

- Tomar-Tu as depicted in Hal Jordan and The Green Lantern Corps #13 (January 2017). Art by Ethan Van Sciver.

Publication information
- Publisher: DC Comics
- First appearance: Green Lantern (vol. 3) #5 (October 1990)
- Created by: Gerard Jones (writer); Pat Broderick (artist)

In-story information
- Alter ego: Tomar-Tu
- Species: Xudarian
- Place of origin: Xudar
- Team affiliations: Green Lantern Corps; Darkstars
- Abilities: Power Ring

Tomar-Tu is a character appearing in media published by DC Comics, primarily in association with the Green Lantern Corps. He is a member of an extraterrestrial race called Xudarians, and is the son and successor of Green Lantern Corps officer Tomar-Re.

== Publication history ==
He first appeared in Green Lantern (vol. 3) #5 (October 1990), and was created by writer Gerard Jones and artist Pat Broderick.

== Fictional character biography ==
=== Early years ===
Tomar-Tu was born on Mosaic World, a composite planet created by the renegade Guardian Appa Ali Apsa by capturing cities from other planets. His birthplace was a city stolen from Xudar, the home planet of his hero, the late Green Lantern Tomar-Re. Tomar-Tu later discovers that his idol was also his father.

Tomar-Tu is one of three Xudarians who venture to a neighboring Earth town to seek out allies. However, the humans attack them on sight out of fear. The three are rescued by Hal Jordan, who is preparing to confront Apsa. When Guy Gardner arrives to assist Jordan, Tomar-Tu gives Jordan the signal necessary for him to create a diversion and tap into the central power battery.

Realizing that return to Xudar was not forthcoming, Tomar-Tu and the Xudarians attempt to promote unity between the races of the Mosaic World. However, one of the human settlements is attacked by a neighboring race known as the Horde. The humans further their anti-alien ideology, leading to further separation of the distinct species on Oa. To prevent further violence, John Stewart separates the Horde from the rest of the Mosaic World with stone walls. However, the walls are soon destroyed and the factions of the Mosaic World go to war with each other. Hal Jordan and several other Lanterns arrive in time to help Stewart separate the warring factions and imprison the instigators of the war.

While the group discusses ways to ensure interdependence between the races, their meeting is interrupted when John Stewart was contacted by Hal Jordan. Star Sapphire was again on the loose and an enraged John leaves to confront her despite Tomar-Tu's efforts to stop him. During the battle, Tomar-Tu and Kreon prove their worth and impress Jordan. When the conflict is over, Tomar-Tu and Kreon are selected to become Green Lanterns.

=== Green Lantern of Sector 2813 ===
As a rookie Lantern, Tomar-Tu is trained by Kilowog, who often tells him stories of great Green Lanterns from the past. His first recorded mission was to face the villain Eclipso, who has possessed Hal Jordan. Tomar-Tu's later missions as Green Lantern include a fight against Entropy. Despite not believing in the cause he is fighting for, he still stands by and protects his fellow Lanterns. Yet in another mission, he is called to the planet Maltus to aid Jordan and the Green Lantern Corps against the Triarch. On the Guardians' homeworld, the Green Lanterns fight alternately against and alongside L.E.G.I.O.N. and the Darkstars.

=== Emerald Twilight and beyond ===
In Emerald Twilight, Jordan attacks Tomar-Tu after becoming Parallax. Hal Jordan swiftly defeats Tomar-Tu, takes his ring, and leaves him for dead. Tomar-Tu is later revealed to have survived, but has been captured by the Manhunters and harbors a grudge against Jordan, intending to kill him.

=== DC Rebirth ===
Tomar-Tu is imprisoned for killing Romat-Ru, a Xudarian serial killer. Tomar-Tu explains he felt he could not risk the murderer escaping to kill again. Tomar-Tu expresses regret for his actions, but wonders why the Lanterns allow their prisoners to live. Tomar-Tu's attitude gains the attention of the Controllers and the Darkstars. Tomar-Tu willingly joins the Darkstars and escapes, desiring to murder more killers like Romat-Ru. After the Darkstars were defeated, haunted by the lives he had taken and refusing to live as a disgraced criminal, Tomar-Tu decided to end his own life, dying in Hal Jordan's arms.

== In other media ==
- Tomar-Tu appears in the Young Justice episode "Zenith and Abyss", voiced by Dee Bradley Baker.
- Tomar-Tu appears as a character summon in Scribblenauts Unmasked: A DC Comics Adventure.
