= Ch'p =

Fictional Green Lantern

- Ch'p as depicted in Green Lantern #148 (January 1982); art by Don Newton.

Publication information
- Publisher: DC Comics
- First appearance: Green Lantern #148 (January 1982)
- Created by: Paul Kupperberg; Don Newton

In-story information
- Species: H'lvenite
- Place of origin: H'lven
- Team affiliations: Green Lantern Corps; Black Lantern Corps; Legion of Super-Pets
- Notable aliases: Green Lantern
- Abilities: Green and Black Lantern Power Rings

Ch'p is a superhero appearing in American comic books published by DC Comics. He is a member of the Green Lantern Corps in the DC Comics Universe. An extraterrestrial, he resembles an anthropomorphic rodent, such as a squirrel.

Diego Luna voices a version of the character named Chip in the animated film DC League of Super-Pets (2022).

== Publication history ==
Ch'p first appeared in Green Lantern #148 (January 1982) and was created by writer Paul Kupperberg and artist Don Newton.

== Fictional character biography ==
A native of the planet H'lven, Ch'p participated in the defense of his homeworld from an invasion by the Crabster army of Doctor Ub'x. He was captured and sentenced to death, but one of the Guardians of the Universe secretly arrived to induct him into the Corps with the power ring of his predecessor, who was killed during the invasion. Using the ring, Ch'p was able to defeat Ub'x and free his world. Shortly afterward, he travelled to Oa, where he was instructed by Kilowog in the same group of recruits as Hal Jordan. Ch'p went on to become the Green Lantern of sector 1014, and became good friends with Jordan, Mogo, Salaak, and other members of the Green Lantern Corps. Ch'p maintained a secret identity on H'lven until he married his longtime girlfriend M'nn'e. While not serving the Guardians on Oa, Ch'p defended H'lven from various threats, many of them engineered by Ub'x.

Ch'p survives the events of Crisis on Infinite Earths and the subsequent reboot of the universe, but discovers that history was rewritten so that he died in an accident 15 years earlier. In the new timeline, his wife M'nn'e had remarried his best friend, D'll. Stunned and disheartened, Ch'p abandons H'lven for Earth. Ch'p also battles Doctor Ub'x, the only other H'lvenite who remembers the pre-Crisis timeline. The two eventually realize the important connection they share and set aside their differences.

Ch'p and Salaak later travel to Oa to participate in the reconstruction of the Green Lantern Corps. Ch'p is assigned to patrol the makeshift city Mosaic World. There, he teams up with John Stewart before being hit and killed by a yellow truck. When the Corps is re-founded following the defeat of Parallax, the H'lvenite B'Dg is selected to replace Ch'p as the new Green Lantern of Sector 1014.

During the Blackest Night event, Ch'p is one of the many fallen Lanterns who are resurrected as members of the Black Lantern Corps. The reanimated Ch'p is destroyed by Guy Gardner wielding Red and Green power rings.

== Other versions ==
- Ch'p appears in JLA: Another Nail as a member of a Green Lantern Corps strike force.
- Ch'p appears in Justice #12.
- Ch'p makes a cameo appearance in Green Lantern: Alliance.

== In other media ==
=== Television ===
- Ch'p appears in the Duck Dodgers episode "The Green Loontern", voiced by Frank Welker.
- Ch'p makes non-speaking cameo appearances in Batman: The Brave and the Bold.
- Ch'p makes non-speaking appearances in Green Lantern: The Animated Series. This version is shown as one of Kilowog's trainees and later becomes a squadron leader.
- Ch'p appears in the Mad segment "Does Someone Have to GOa?", voiced by Kevin Shinick. As part of a reality show, the Green Lantern Corps fire him before he is run over by a car.
- Ch'p is referenced in the Lanterns episode "The Weenie" when Hal mentions that he doesn't talk to most of his fellow Green Lanterns, including one who looks like a squirrel.

=== Film ===
- Ch'p appears in Green Lantern: First Flight, voiced by David Lander.
- Ch'p makes a non-speaking cameo appearance in Green Lantern: Emerald Knights.
- Ch'p, renamed Chip, appears in DC League of Super-Pets, voiced by Diego Luna. This version is a red squirrel from Earth who gains electrokinetic abilities from exposure to orange kryptonite. After joining forces with Krypto and a group of similarly empowered shelter animals to rescue the Justice League, Chip is adopted by Jessica Cruz and becomes a founding member of the titular League of Super-Pets.

=== Video games ===
Ch'p appears as a character summon in Scribblenauts Unmasked: A DC Comics Adventure.

=== Miscellaneous ===
- Ch'p appears in DC Super Friends #14. This version is the leader of the Legion of Super-Pets.
- Ch'p appears in Tiny Titans #25.
- Ch'p appears in issue #19 of the Batman: The Brave and the Bold tie-in comic.
- Ch'p appears in the Injustice: Gods Among Us tie-in comic. He joins a group of Green Lanterns in attempting to apprehend Superman, only to be killed by Sinestro.
