= Kreon =

- Kreon as depicted in Green Lantern (vol. 3) #34 (December 1992). Art by M. D. Bright.

Publication information
- Publisher: DC Comics
- First appearance: Green Lantern (vol. 3) #22 (March 1992)
- Created by: Gerard Jones (writer); Pat Broderick (artist)

In-story information
- Full name: Kreon
- Species: Teban
- Place of origin: Tebis
- Team affiliations: Green Lantern Corps; Black Lantern Corps
- Abilities: Green and Black Lantern power rings

Kreon is a fictional character featured in comic books published by DC Comics, primarily in association with the Green Lantern Corps. He first appeared in Green Lantern (vol. 3) #22 (March 1992).

== Fictional character biography ==
A Teban warlord, General Kreon sought to end wars on Tebis rather than start them. He had seen the horrors of war and previously lost an eye and an arm in his service to the military. His beliefs about war were in complete contrast to that of his species, who generally glorify war and the domination of other species.

Seeking to end his race's bloodlust and to end the wars for good, Kreon recruits Star Sapphire from a local thug named Flicker. However, Star Sapphire is unable to be controlled and kills over a dozen men before being subdued. Shunned by his fellow Chieftains because of his lack of strength and the destruction his failed plan had wrought, Kreon attracts the eye of Hal Jordan. Impressed and seeing his potential, Jordan recruits Kreon into the Green Lantern Corps.

When Hal introduces Kreon to the Corps, he is taken in by Kilowog, who trains him along with his fellow Lanterns. Among his fellow rookies, Kreon has a particular dislike for Boodikka, who he sees as barbaric and lacking in discipline. Their disagreements with each other eventually endanger the protection of the Guardians.

Kilowog calls John Stewart to give Kreon and Boodikka a 'pep talk' on tolerance. When this fails, Guy Gardner uses his Power Ring to make the two confront manifestations of their fears. While Boodikka belittles Kreon for his inability to defeat his opponent, she is unable to defeat her own. Realizing that they finally need each other, the two switch opponents and come out victorious.

Hal Jordan and Guy Gardner later discover that Kreon and Boodikka have been captured by the Manhunters, along with the other Lost Lanterns. Kreon is mortally wounded while battling the Manhunters and dies in Boodikka's arms. His ring, upon his death, chooses Boodikka as his successor.

During the Blackest Night event, Kreon is one of the many fallen Lanterns who are resurrected to join the Black Lantern Corps.

== In other media ==
Kreon appears as a character summon in Scribblenauts Unmasked: A DC Comics Adventure.
