= Boodikka =

- Boodikka as depicted on the cover of Guy Gardner: Warrior #10 (June 1993). Art by Joe Staton.

Publication information
- Publisher: DC Comics
- First appearance: As Boodikka: Green Lantern (vol. 3) #20 (January 1992); As Green Lantern: Green Lantern (vol. 3) #23 (March 1992)
- Created by: Gerard Jones; Pat Broderick; Romeo Tanghal; Albert De Guzman; Anthony Tollin

In-story information
- Alter ego: Boodikka
- Species: Bellatrixian
- Place of origin: Bellatrix
- Team affiliations: Green Lantern Corps
- Partnerships: Zale
- Notable aliases: Alpha Lantern
- Abilities: Green Lantern Power Ring

Boodikka is a character appearing in comic books published by DC Comics, and a member of the Green Lantern Corps. Her name is a play on the ancient British warrior-queen Boudica.

== Publication history ==
Boodikka first appeared in Green Lantern (vol. 3) #20 and was created by Gerard Jones, Pat Broderick, Romeo Tanghal, Albert De Guzman, and Anthony Tollin.

== Fictional character biography ==
Boodikka of the planet Bellatrix was recruited by Chaselon to join the then-reconstituted Green Lantern Corps. Boodikka had previously belonged to the Bellatrix Bombers mercenary group.

Initially, Hal Jordan is dismayed and put off by Boodikka's aggressive attitude. Kilowog, a renowned trainer in the Corps and the trainer of Jordan himself, is eager to train someone so challenging and gave her his recommendation as a candidate.

Boodikka is opposed to authority and is often at odds with Kreon, a former chieftain who is used to discipline and military precision. Kilowog forces Boodikka and Kreon to battle physical projections of their fears: Kreon's fear of the uncontrollable and Boodikka's fear of the restraints of authority. Boodikka and Kreon agree to swap opponents and defeat them, ultimately reconciling with each other.

Boodikka eventually becomes a recruiter for the Corps. She encounters Barin, a young soldier of a kindred warrior species who she believes will prove to be an asset to the group. However, Barin is critically injured in his first battle and placed on life support.

=== Emerald Twilight and beyond ===
In Emerald Twilight, Hal Jordan is driven to insanity and becomes the villain Parallax following the destruction of his hometown Coast City. He attacks Boodikka, cuts off her right hand, and takes her power ring, leaving her for dead.

Boodikka is later revealed to have survived, but has been placed in suspended animation by the Manhunters along with many other former Green Lanterns, with the Manhunters intending to harness their energy to create more advanced Manhunters. After being freed, Boodikka is shocked that she no longer has her hand, and appears to remember nothing past her encounter with Parallax. During a later confrontation with the Manhunters, Kreon is killed and his ring chooses Boodikka. She resumes her duties in the Green Lantern Corps, replacing her lost hand with a Lantern construct.

=== Post-Sinestro Corps War ===
Boodikka as an Alpha Lantern, as depicted in Green Lantern Corps (vol. 2) #22 (March 2008). Art by Rodolfo Migliari.

Boodikka becomes a member of the Alpha Lanterns. The Lanterns being enhanced with Manhunter technology, effectively making them cyborgs.

Boodikka later falls under the mental control of Cyborg Superman. As she attacks Kyle Rayner, Soranik Natu, and John Stewart, Green Lantern member Hannu ambushes and severely injures her. This temporarily frees Boodikka from Cyborg Superman's control; she instructs the other Lanterns to recharge the battery with the energy she has absorbed. Her fellow Lanterns repair her enough for her to fight, and she joins in the attack on Cyborg Superman's base. During the battle, Cyborg Superman's body is destroyed and his consciousness attempts to take control of Boodikka's body. Boodikka's consciousness fights back, defeating him. On her return to Oa, Boodikka is made a member of the Lantern Honor Guard.

=== Reign of Doomsday ===
Boodikka later appears at the remains of the destroyed planet New Krypton, where she encounters Batman and Supergirl. Boodikka explains that the Guardians had sent her on a mission to survey the ruins as a follow-up to the Green Lantern Corps' initial inspection of the planet. Suddenly, the heroes are attacked by Doomsday, who strikes Boodikka before she can react. Due to her injuries, Boodikka is unable to effectively wield her ring and is nearly captured by Doomsday before being rescued by Supergirl. With Starman and Saint Walker acting as a distraction, Batman and Supergirl take Boodikka to the JLA Watchtower. Doomsday follows the two aboard. As he's about to attack them, Cyborg Superman emerges from Boodikka's body. After Doomsday captures Supergirl and Cyborg Superman and flees the Watchtower, Starman states that Boodikka is healing herself in the Justice League's medical facility and should soon have enough energy to return to Oa.

In War of the Green Lanterns, Boodikka and the Alpha Lanterns are killed by Alpha Lantern Varix and buried on Oa.

== In other media ==
=== Television ===
- Boodikka appears in the Duck Dodgers episode "The Green Loontern", voiced by Grey DeLisle.
- Boodikka makes a cameo appearance in the Justice League Action episode "Watchtower Tours".

=== Film ===
Boodikka as depicted in Green Lantern: First Flight.

- Boodikka appears in Green Lantern: First Flight, voiced by Tricia Helfer. This version is an ally of Sinestro who is later killed in a fight with Hal Jordan and Kilowog.
- Boodikka makes a cameo appearance in Green Lantern: Emerald Knights, voiced again by Grey DeLisle.
- Boodikka makes a cameo appearance in Green Lantern (2011). She attended the meeting on Oa where the leader Sinestro informed his comrades about the threat of Parallax.

=== Video games ===
Boodikka appears as a character summon in Scribblenauts Unmasked: A DC Comics Adventure.
