= Green Lantern: First Flight =

2009 animated film directed by Lauren Montgomery

- DVD cover
- Directed by: Lauren Montgomery
- Written by: Alan Burnett; Michael Allen
- Based on: Hal Jordan by: John Broome; Gil Kane
- Produced by: Bobbie Page; Bruce Timm
- Starring: Christopher Meloni; Victor Garber; Tricia Helfer; Michael Madsen; John Larroquette; Kurtwood Smith; Larry Drake
- Edited by: Rob Desales
- Music by: Robert Kral
- Production companies: Warner Bros. Animation; Warner Premiere; DC Comics; Telecom Animation Film (Animation services)
- Distributed by: Warner Home Video
- Release date: July 28, 2009
- Running time: 77 minutes
- Country: United States
- Language: English

Green Lantern: First Flight is a 2009 American animated superhero film based on the DC Comics Green Lantern mythos. Centering on the first mission of Hal Jordan (Christopher Meloni), the first human inducted into the Green Lantern Corps, the film was written by veteran DC Comics animation collaborator Alan Burnett, produced by Bruce Timm and directed by Lauren Montgomery. The fifth film of the DC Universe Animated Original Movies released by Warner Premiere and Warner Bros. Animation, the film was released on home media on July 28, 2009, and made its US broadcast premiere on Cartoon Network on January 16, 2010.

It was the last film to feature Malachi Throne and David Lander before their deaths on March 13, 2013 and December 4, 2020 respectively.

== Plot ==
When the universe was in its infancy, the Guardians of the Universe, the first sentient beings to exist, harnessed the power of the green element (representing will) to create a battery of energy with which to maintain peace throughout the universe. However, the battery was vulnerable to the color yellow (representing fear), the opposite of green on the light spectrum. The Guardians hid the most concentrated source of yellow energy, the yellow element, to prevent others from using it against them.

Test pilot Hal Jordan is summoned by Abin Sur; with his last breath, Sur anoints Jordan as his successor. Jordan is subsequently escorted to the Green Lantern Corps on Oa. Despite hostility from the Guardians who look down on humans, they agree to place him under the supervision of senior officer Sinestro, who is investigating Abin's murder. While undercover on the ship of Kanjar Ro searching for the whereabouts of the stolen yellow element, Abin had been fatally wounded and fled to Earth as the nearest inhabited world. Unbeknownst to the other Green Lanterns, Sinestro is revealed to be in league with Kanjar, having betrayed Sur and arranged for the theft of the yellow element to fashion it into a weapon for his personal use.

Jordan recognizes that Sinestro's beliefs are not in line with those of the Guardians: his mentor believes that the Guardians have reduced the Corps to merely picking up the messes criminals create as opposed to proactively dealing with the problem. During a mission to capture Kanjar Ro, Jordan is knocked unconscious by Kanjar's energy staff. Sinestro comes in and murders Kanjar, pinning the blame on Jordan. As punishment, the Guardians strip Jordan of his ring.

While Jordan waits to be taken home, Sinestro uses his ring to temporarily animate Kanjar's corpse, allowing him to learn the location of the Weaponers of Qward. Jordan secretly checks the morgue with Lanterns Boodikka and Kilowog, catching Sinestro in the act. Boodikka shows her true colors and attacks Kilowog; when Jordan declines Sinestro's offer to join them, the latter departs as Boodikka attempts to kill Jordan. He kills her using Kanjar's unstable energy staff and exposes Sinestro's treachery to the Guardians after Kilowog vouches for him.

On Qward, the Weaponers present Sinestro with a yellow ring and power battery. He uses both to lay waste to Oa, the yellow light easily overpowering the Green Lantern rings. The yellow battery destroys the green battery, rendering all Lantern rings inert and causing death by asphyxiation of countless Green Lanterns who were in space at the time of their rings' failure. Jordan, having recovered his own ring moments too late, finds the battery and pounds on the inert green element. He places his ring on the small crack that appears, absorbing its power. Imbued with the full power of will, Jordan destroys the yellow battery by crushing it between two moons.

Having exhausted his ring destroying the yellow battery, Jordan is left to fight against Sinestro under his own power. After an intense hand-to-hand fight without constructs, Jordan uses the last of his power to knock Sinestro to the surface of Oa, where Kilowog crushes the yellow ring with his foot. Having regained partial power to his ring earlier, Kilowog takes to the air and saves Jordan from a fatal fall to Oa's surface.

Once Oa is rebuilt and the Green Lantern battery restored, the Guardians give the privilege of leading the Corps in reciting their oath to Jordan. Jordan then leaves for Earth to check in with his other boss, Carol Ferris, remarking on the long "commute".

== Cast ==
- Christopher Meloni as Hal Jordan / Green Lantern
- Victor Garber as Sinestro
- Tricia Helfer as Boodikka
- Michael Madsen as Kilowog
- John Larroquette as Tomar-Re
- Kurtwood Smith as Kanjar Ro
- Larry Drake as Ganthet
- William Schallert as Appa Ali Apsa
- Malachi Throne as Ranakar
- Olivia d'Abo as Carol Ferris
- Richard Green as Cuch
- Juliet Landau as Labella
- David Lander as Ch'p
- Richard McGonagle as Abin Sur
- Rob Paulsen as Weaponers of Qward
- Kath Soucie as Arisia Rrab
- Jim Wise as Lieutenant
- Bruce Timm as Bug Boy

== Production ==
According to director Montgomery, Jordan's origin story was previously covered in the Justice League: The New Frontier film: "...we really didn't want to spend a whole lot of time telling that same story over again. So in Green Lantern: First Flight, the origin story is over and done before the opening credits."

This marks the first time since Batman Beyond: Return of the Joker in 2000 that Warner Bros. outsourced the animation to Japanese animation studio, Telecom Animation Film, a subsidiary of TMS Entertainment, as well as one of the few times after the early 2000s that TMS has supplied animation services to a Western studio, which they now rarely do as a result of increasingly demanding costs.

== Soundtrack ==
Green Lantern: First Flight (Soundtrack from the DC Universe Animated Original Movie)

Film score (Digital download) by Robert J. Kral
- Released: August 25, 2009
- Length: 60:44
- Label: WaterTower Music (Digital download) La-La Land Records (CD)

Green Lantern: First Flight (Soundtrack from the DC Universe Animated Original Movie)
No.	Title	Length
1.	"Main Title"	2:06
2.	"The Ring Chooses Hal"	4:42
3.	"Hal Meets / The Flight of The Lanterns"	3:46
4.	"Labella's Club"	3:28
5.	"Going After Cuch"	3:04
6.	"The Way I Heard It"	2:19
7.	"Bugs in the Baggage"	4:14
8.	"Teleport Pursuit"	2:28
9.	"Brutal Attack / Fate of Kanjar Ro"	3:50
10.	"Relinquishing the Ring"	1:16
11.	"Back From / Boodikka Turns"	5:49
12.	"Weaponers / Sinestro Transforms"	4:28
13.	"The New Power Arrives"	2:35
14.	"The Corps Fights Sinestro"	2:48
15.	"The Corps Fall"	1:34
16.	"Revival of the Green Lantern""	2:25
17.	"Asteroid Battle"	2:47
18.	"Ring Against Ring"	3:00
19.	"The Green Lantern Pledge"	1:03
20.	"End Credits"	3:00
Total length:		60:44

== Reception ==
Green Lantern: First Flight received mixed reviews from critics. ComingSoon.net gave a positive review, giving it a 7.5 out of 10, citing the impressive action sequences and praising the voice acting, remarking that "Green Lantern: First Flight is a fun action adventure that should please comic book fans." IGN praised the animation and the scale, but complained that the film glosses over a lot of Hal Jordan's backstory from the comics and lacks character development. "The filmmakers seem less interested in his transition from an ordinary man into a intergalactic superhero, and in their eagerness to get him up into space and fighting aliens right away." Overall they gave the film a 7 out of 10. Comic Book Resources gave a positive review for Green Lantern: First Flight, citing that "Green Lantern: First Flight is a welcome portrayal of the material. It shows the appropriate scale and scope of the concept. It illustrates the characters in their best light and, most crucially, makes you wish 'Green Lantern' was its own ongoing animated series." AMC's Filmcritic.com also gave a positive film review, giving the animated feature 4.0 out of 5 stars.

In a more negative review, Ryan Cracknell of Movie Views stated, "More interested in the villain than the hero, First Flight is a bland look at one of the sides of the DC universe that's normally much more interesting." James O'Ehley of Sci-Fi Movie Page wrote, "Clocking in at a mere 77 minutes, Green Lantern is action-packed right from the start, but the action comes at a price: not much effort is made to make Jordan an interesting or even likeable hero. In fact he is an excruciatingly one-dimensional character that is simply swept along from one action scene to the next."

The film earned $6,411,225 from domestic DVD sales and $2,080,575 from domestic Blu-ray sales, bringing its total domestic home video earnings to $8,491,800.

== Home media ==
Green Lantern: First Flight was released on standard DVD in single and double disc editions, along with a high definition Blu-ray release, on July 28, 2009. Features outlined for the double disc edition in the press release include two production featurettes, commentary, a preview of Superman/Batman: Public Enemies, trailers of the DC Universe features, digital copy download, and the first two episodes of Justice League picked by Bruce Timm. The Blu-ray edition has all the features of the double disc standard definition release including three additional Justice League episodes selected by Timm and the Duck Dodgers episode "The Green Loontern".
