= Tomar-Re =

Character in DC Comics

- Tomar-Re as depicted in Green Lantern: Emerald Dawn #4 (March 1990). Art by M. D. Bright (pencils), Romeo Tanghal (inks), and Anthony Tollins (colors).

Publication information
- Publisher: DC Comics
- First appearance: Green Lantern (vol. 2) #6 (June 1961)
- Created by: John Broome; Gil Kane

In-story information
- Alter ego: Tomar-Re
- Species: Xudarian
- Place of origin: Xudar
- Team affiliations: Green Lantern Corps; Black Lantern Corps; Justice League
- Abilities: Power Ring

Tomar-Re is a character appearing in comics published by DC Comics. He is a member of the Green Lantern Corps, as well as the predecessor and father of Tomar-Tu.

The character appeared in the 2011 Green Lantern film, voiced by Geoffrey Rush.

== Publication history ==
Tomar-Re (left), making his debut on the cover of Green Lantern (vol. 2) #6 (June 1961). Art by Gil Kane (pencils) and Joe Giella (inks).

Tomar-Re debuted in Green Lantern (vol. 2) #6 (June 1961) in a story written by John Broome with art by Gil Kane.

== Fictional character biography ==
Tomar-Re is a Xudarian, a humanoid bird-like alien originating from the planet Xudar in Sector 2813. He was a scientist on his homeworld before joining the Green Lantern Corps. Tomar-Re became a pivotal member of the Corps, training new members, like Arisia Rrab, and serving in the Honor Guard. He investigated reports of abuses of power by Sinestro on Korugar. He was close friends with Abin Sur, Green Lantern of neighboring sector 2814. He was also the first Lantern to meet Sur's replacement, Hal Jordan, and the two got along equally well. In pre-Crisis continuity, Tomar-Re first met Jordan after contacting him about a threat to a world in his sector, which was happening at the same time alien invaders were attacking Xudar. Jordan stopped the threat, then helped Tomar-Re defeat the invaders. In post-Crisis continuity, Tomar-Re mentored Jordan shortly after he was recruited into the Green Lantern Corps.

Tomar-Re's most famous mission while serving in the Corps dealt with the planet Krypton. Krypton, a planet in sector 2813, was growing increasingly unstable and was going to explode due to internal pressures in the planet's core. Tomar-Re sought to use a rare compound called stellarium to absorb some of the tectonic pressure, thus saving Krypton. He gathered the compound and was en route to Krypton when a solar flare blinded him and forced him to drop the stellarium. The first thing he saw upon his sight returning was Krypton exploding. The Guardians recovered Tomar-Re and brought him back to Oa, where he healed and rested.

Tomar-Re is retired at the time when the Anti-Monitor seeks to conquer the multiverse. However, he battles the Anti-Monitor alongside the Corps, during which he is killed by Goldface. Tomar-Re's son Tomar-Tu succeeds him as a Green Lantern after obtaining his own power ring.

=== Post-mortem ===
In the "Blackest Night" event, all of the fallen Green Lanterns buried on Oa are reanimated as members of the Black Lantern Corps. Tomar-Re is among the many Black Lanterns shown standing against the Green Lanterns on Oa.

After the events of the "War of the Green Lanterns", Hal Jordan and Sinestro are trapped in the Dead Zone by the Guardians of the Universe, until they encounter a mysterious figure lurking in the zone observing them. The figure is revealed to be Tomar-Re, who asks Jordan and Sinestro to stop Volthoom (the First Lantern) before he can alter history.

In DC Rebirth, Hal Jordan is transported to the Emerald Space, an afterlife for fallen Green Lanterns, and encounters Tomar-Re.

== Other versions ==
An alternate universe version of Tomar-Re appears in Absolute Green Lantern. This version received his name after stealing the power of the Red Flame of Restraint.

== In other media ==
=== Television ===
- Tomar-Re makes a non-speaking cameo appearance in the Superman: The Animated Series episode "In Brightest Day...".
- Tomar-Re makes a non-speaking cameo appearance in the Justice League (2001) episode "In Blackest Night".
- Tomar-Re makes a non-speaking cameo appearance in the Justice League Unlimited episode "The Return".
- Tomar-Re appears in the Duck Dodgers episode "The Green Loontern".
- Tomar-Re appears in The Batman episode "Ring Toss", voiced by an uncredited actor.
- Tomar-Re makes non-speaking cameo appearances in Batman: The Brave and the Bold.
- Tomar-Re appears in Green Lantern: The Animated Series, voiced by Jeff Bennett.
- Tomar-Re makes non-speaking cameo appearances in Teen Titans Go!.
- Tomar-Re appears in Young Justice, voiced by Dee Bradley Baker. This version was friends with Jor-El and Zor-El. After being killed by Lor-Zod, his ring is transferred to a Forager.

=== Film ===
==== Live-action ====
Tomar-Re as he appears in Green Lantern.

- Tomar-Re appears in Green Lantern, voiced by Geoffrey Rush.
- Tomar-Re was intended to appear in a post-credits scene for Justice League (2017), but was ultimately cut.

==== Animation ====
- Tomar-Re appears in Green Lantern: First Flight, voiced by John Larroquette. This version is initially hostile to Hal Jordan due to a misunderstanding and is later killed by Sinestro after the latter becomes a Yellow Lantern.
- Tomar-Re appears in Green Lantern: Emerald Knights, voiced by James Arnold Taylor.
- Tomar-Re makes a non-speaking cameo appearance in Teen Titans Go! To the Movies.

=== Video games ===
Tomar-Re appears as a character summon in Scribblenauts Unmasked: A DC Comics Adventure.

=== Miscellaneous ===
- Tomar-Re appears in Legion of Super Heroes in the 31st Century #6.
- A hologram of Tomar-Re appears in Smallville Season 11: Lantern #1. This version was killed while trying to stop a global civil war instigated by General Zod, with his ring traveling to Earth and choosing Clark Kent as his successor months after he became Superman.
- Tomar-Re appears in the Injustice: Gods Among Us prequel comic. After Hal Jordan aids and abets Superman's Regime and joins the Sinestro Corps, Tomar-Re joins the Green Lantern Corps in an attempt to apprehend Superman. However, they suffer heavy casualties, with Tomar-Re and the survivors being forced to surrender their rings and accept imprisonment in a Regime prison.
