= Green Lantern: Rise of the Manhunters =

2011 video game

- Xbox 360 and PlayStation 3 cover art
- Developers: Double Helix Games (non-Nintendo consoles); Griptonite Games (Nintendo versions); Other Ocean Interactive (iOS version)
- Publisher: Warner Bros. Interactive Entertainment
- Director: David Msika
- Designer: Benjamin Cholewinski
- Programmer: Carlos Bustamante
- Artist: David Robert Donatucci
- Writer: Marv Wolfman
- Composers: Kaveh Cohen; Michael David Nielsen
- Platforms: PlayStation 3, Xbox 360, Wii, Nintendo DS, Nintendo 3DS, iOS
- Release: NA: June 7, 2011; EU: June 10, 2011; AU: June 29, 2011
- Genres: Action; Platform-adventure (Nintendo console and handheld versions)
- Modes: Single-player, multiplayer

Green Lantern: Rise of the Manhunters is an action video game, the first based on DC Comics' Green Lantern (Hal Jordan). The game is a tie-in/sequel to the film Green Lantern, which opened in theaters on June 17, 2011. The game features 3D visuals on the Nintendo 3DS, PlayStation 3 and Xbox 360, providing TriOviz Inficolor 3D for standard televisions and stereoscopic 3D for dedicated 3DTVs.

== Gameplay ==
Green Lantern: Rise of the Manhunters offers three different game modes. The player takes control of Hal Jordan and the power of his Green Lantern ring is at the player's disposal, in which weapons and objects can be created to defeat enemies and progress through levels. Most versions of the game provide a mix of on-foot beat 'em up battles and flying rail shooter sequences. The on-foot levels in the non-Nintendo versions allow for full 3-D movement from fixed camera perspectives, but are presented in 2.5D in the Nintendo versions. The non-Nintendo versions also support drop-in, drop-out cooperative multiplayer, in which a second player takes control of Sinestro. The Wii version can be played with either the Wii Remote and Nunchuk, or the Classic Controller.

== Synopsis ==
The Manhunters are an android race, originally created by the Guardians of the Universe to serve as the first interstellar police force. The Manhunters became more obsessed with administering punishment than serving justice, forcing the Guardians to dissolve their ranks. The few Manhunters that survived fled into exile and the Guardians founded a new elite police force called the Green Lantern Corps and armed its members with specially crafted power rings. Now the Manhunters are back and out for revenge, readying their forces for a war against the Guardians and the Green Lantern Corps. Faced with destruction, the Corps is looking to gifted but cocky test pilot Hal Jordan as the newest recruit, to protect peace and preserve justice.

=== Plot ===
The game begins with Hal Jordan, Kilowog, and Sinestro attending Abin Sur's funeral on Oa. When Oa is attacked by the Manhunters, the three defend the Central Power Battery and repel the invasion, but the Manhunters find and steal energy from the Yellow Fear Battery which the Guardians kept secret from the Corps, which implies there is a traitor among them. They then pick up a distress call from Queen Aga'po on the planet Zamaron. While Kilowog goes to Biot, the Manhunters' home world, Sinestro and Hal go to Zamaron to aid Aga'po. While on Zamaron, Sinestro and Hal face about the Willhunters, a Manhunter-developed weapon which mind controls its victims. After Sinestro and Hal are separated, Hal frees the captive Aga'po, learning that she has already been exposed to a Willhunter and is under the Manhunters' control, forcing her to lead them to the Zamarons' source of Violet energy, but Hal defeats and frees Aga'po. Hal and Sinestro then go to Biot, where they are making use of the Fear energy they stole from Oa. After reuniting with Kilowog, they defeat the Highmaster, leader of the Manhunters. The three then go back to Oa and encounter Amon Sur, Abin Sur's son who believes that he should have his father's ring and it is revealed that he betrayed the Green Lantern Corps to the Manhunters and engineered the earlier and current invasion of Oa. Hal then defeats Amon on Oa and Amon is arrested as Hal is honored for his dedication.

== Development ==
Building on the anticipation of the feature film Green Lantern, the non-Nintendo versions of Green Lantern: Rise of the Manhunters include the likeness and voice talent of Ryan Reynolds as Hal Jordan, who is the star of the film. Radio commentator and voice actor Michael Jackson reprised his role as Ganthet for the same versions from the animated film Green Lantern: Emerald Knights, a direct-to-video project that was timed for release of the live-action Green Lantern film. There is no voice acting for the Nintendo versions.

== Reception ==
Green Lantern: Rise of the Manhunters received mixed reviews. IGN, Gamespot and G4's X-Play granted a 60% score for the non-Nintendo versions (6.0 out of 10 and 3 stars out of 5), with IGN deeming the non-Nintendo versions to be slightly superior over the Nintendo versions, giving the Wii and DS versions a 5.5 out of 10 and the 3DS version a 4.5 out of 10.

== Mobile version ==
An Apple iOS version was released in the same time as the console release. It plays like a rail shooter unlike the console releases and was developed by Other Ocean Interactive.
