= Amon Sur =

Fictional alien supervillain in the DC Universe

- Amon Sur as depicted in Green Lantern/Sinestro Corps Secret Files #1 (December 2007). Art by Joe Padro.

Publication information
- Publisher: DC Comics
- First appearance: Green Lantern (vol. 3) # 162 (June 2003)
- Created by: Judd Winick; Ben Raab; Charlie Adlard

In-story information
- Alter ego: Amon Sur
- Species: Ungaran
- Place of origin: Ungara (Sector 2814)
- Team affiliations: Black Circle Syndicate; Sinestro Corps; Black Lantern Corps
- Abilities: Qwardian power ring; Ungaran physiology: Regeneration of limbs and head

Amon Sur is a supervillain in the DC Universe. He is the son of the Green Lantern Abin Sur and nephew of the villain/antihero Sinestro by marriage with Sur's sister Arin.

== Publication history ==
Amon Sur first appeared in Green Lantern (vol. 3) #162 (June 2003) and was created by writers Judd Winick and Ben Raab, and artist Charlie Adlard.

== Fictional character biography ==
Amon Sur is the son of Abin Sur, a Green Lantern who was killed in duty. He feels that Abin abandoned him in favor of the Green Lantern Corps and decides to take his anger out on all Green Lanterns. Amon is eventually stopped by Hal Jordan's successor, Kyle Rayner, and a second-generation Guardian of the Universe named Lianna. Lianna decapitates Amon, but he survives and regenerates his body.

Years later, Amon confronts Hal Jordan, who has returned to his Green Lantern role after being freed from the influence of Parallax. Hal defeats Amon, who receives a duplicate of Sinestro's ring from the Qwardians and is recruited into the Sinestro Corps, representing Space Sector 2814.

After the Sinestro Corps War, Amon Sur is found by a contingent of Green Lanterns on the planet Varva, having murdered the family of deceased Lantern Ke'Haan. He is killed by Laira, Ke'Haan's close friend. Amon's ring leaves him after his death and heads for Earth, only to be destroyed by the Guardians. Laira incinerates Amon's body to prevent any chance of resurrection.

During the Blackest Night storyline, Amon Sur is resurrected as a Black Lantern. He attacks Sinestro at the home of the Star Sapphires, only to be destroyed by the combined attack of Hal Jordan and members of the Indigo Tribe.

== Powers and abilities ==
Due to his Ungaran physiology, Amon Sur can naturally regenerate most of his limbs, even his head.

Amon Sur has wielded yellow and black power rings, which enable him to fly and create energy constructs. As a Black Lantern, he can remove the hearts of others to empower himself.

== In other media ==
- Amon Sur appears in Green Lantern: Rise of the Manhunters, voiced by Steve Blum.
- Amon Sur appears in DC Universe Online.
- Amon Sur appears as a character summon in Scribblenauts Unmasked: A DC Comics Adventure.
