= Green Lantern: The Animated Series =

American television series

- Genre: Action; Adventure; Science fiction; Drama; Superhero
- Based on: Green Lantern by: John Broome; Gil Kane
- Developed by: Bruce Timm; Giancarlo Volpe; Jim Krieg
- Directed by: Sam Liu; Rick Morales
- Voices of: Josh Keaton; Kevin Michael Richardson; Jason Spisak; Grey DeLisle
- Theme music composer: Frederik Wiedmann
- Composer: Frederik Wiedmann
- Country of origin: United States
- No. of seasons: 1
- No. of episodes: 26

Production
- Executive producers: Bruce Timm; Sam Register
- Producers: Giancarlo Volpe; Jim Krieg
- Editor: Joe Gall
- Running time: 22 minutes
- Production companies: DC Entertainment; Warner Bros. Animation

Original release
- Network: Cartoon Network
- Release: November 11, 2011 – March 16, 2013

Related
- Catwoman: Hunted; DC Showcase: Green Arrow; Young Justice

Green Lantern: The Animated Series is an American animated superhero television series based on the DC Comics superhero Green Lantern. The series aired on Cartoon Network, as part of their "DC Nation" television block. The series follows the adventures of Hal Jordan, the Green Lantern of Sector 2814, and his fellow warrior ally, Kilowog against the series' main antagonists, the Red Lanterns, led by the villain Atrocitus, and the Manhunters.

A one-hour sneak peek aired on November 11, 2011, it ran from March 17, 2012, until March 16, 2013. A special screening of the first episode was shown at New York Comic Con 2011 on October 15. This was the first Green Lantern television series and the first CGI DC/WB series. The series was cancelled after one season due to poor toy sales after the negative reception and poor box office performance of the live-action film.

== Plot ==
The series focuses on the adventures of Hal Jordan, the Green Lantern of Sector 2814, and his partner Kilowog. Jordan steals a space ship controlled by Aya (an AI) and travels to "Frontier Space" together with Kilowog. This is the edge of the Guardians of the Universe' territory, where Green Lanterns are being killed by Red Lanterns. Atrocitus, their leader, wants revenge for the destruction of his world by the Manhunters, created by the Guardians, but who were also shut down by the Guardians. During their adventure, the groups meets Red Lantern Razer. They take him as a prisoner, but eventually adopt him as a teammate after he helps them defeat Atrocitus. Razer also falls in love with Aya, but after Atrocitus is defeated and Razer rejects her, Aya decides to eliminate all life in the universe.

At the end of season one, Jordan discovers that Aya is born out of a living being and that she is alive. He tries to convince her to end her universal genocide, but fails. Razer gets severely injured when he tries to kill Aya, as she defends herself by firing a laser beam. Hal convinces Aya that what she is doing is wrong and she saves the universe and heals Razer, but in Aya's anger, she recreated the Manhunter army and downloaded a copy of herself into every single Manhunter. Aya launches a computer virus that destroys the Manhunters and herself.

Razer refuses to believe that Aya is dead because she was not a complete robot after all, but alive; and a living being cannot be destroyed by a computer virus. He starts a galaxy-spanning search, in the hope to find her somewhere in the universe. A Blue Lantern ring follows Razer, but if he will receive it is left ambiguous.

== Characters ==
=== Main characters ===
- Hal Jordan / Green Lantern (voiced by Josh Keaton) – The main protagonist, Hal Jordan is the first human to become a Green Lantern, and is considered one of the best. He is an almost fearless and skilled Lantern. He has a history of disobeying orders and disregarding rules to achieve success. His superiors see him as a loose cannon, but they are willing to overlook his transgressions due to his skill and accomplishments. At the start of the second half of Season 1, he was replaced by Guy Gardner as the Green Lantern of Earth, but was promoted to Honor Guard Corps for his victory over the Red Lanterns.
- Kilowog (voiced by Kevin Michael Richardson) – A veteran Green Lantern, Kilowog is a close friend of Hal and is in charge of training new Green Lantern recruits. Kilowog accompanies Hal in Frontier Space. He is a member of the Honor Guard, and is less willing to abandon the rules of the Corps. Kilowog is often skeptical of Hal's actions, but he is completely loyal to Hal.
- Razer (voiced by Jason Spisak) – A reformed Red Lantern who is original to the series. Razer was a follower of Atrocitus but began to question him, eventually turning against the other Red Lanterns after they placed a bomb on a colony planet. They forced Razer to activate it to prove his loyalty, subsequently destroying the planet. The guilt-ridden Razer sought out Hal and tried to provoke him into killing him as penance. Hal, however, took him prisoner. After Razer proved himself and discovered Kilowog managed to save most of the colonists, he is invited to join the team and make up for his past actions, now fueling his Red Power Ring with the rage he feels towards Atrocitus. Over the course of the series, Razer falls in love with Aya, who based her appearance on his dead wife Ilana. He confessed his love for her at the end of the episode "Loss", but took it back in the episode "Cold Fury", saying that he only felt love because she looked like Ilana, although the truthfulness of this is unclear. At the end of the episode "Dark Matter", Razer refuses to believe that Aya is truly gone and vows to scour the galaxy for as long as it takes to find her. As he flies off into space, a Blue Lantern ring appears and flies after him, implying that Razer, now filled with hope rather than rage, will become a Blue Lantern.
- Aya (voiced by Grey DeLisle) – The Interceptor's AI, Aya was created by Scar as an empathetic alternative to the Manhunters. After being infused with a fragment of an entity inside the Green Lanterns' Central Battery, Aya developed sentience, leading her to transfer data without Scar's permission. Scar confronted Aya, wiped her memories, and installed her into the Interceptor. Throughout the series, Aya develops feelings for Razer. After Razer rejects her, Aya shuts down her emotions and assumes control of the Anti-Monitor and the Manhunters before traveling to the beginning of the universe in an attempt to eliminate all emotion. However, Aya was never able to completely seal off her emotions and regained her senses after wounding Razer. With the Manhunters still a threat and each possessing a copy of her coding, Aya releases a virus to wipe all versions of the Aya program from existence, including herself.

=== Guardians of the Universe ===
- Ganthet (voiced by Ian Abercrombie)
- Appa Ali Apsa (voiced by Brian George)
- Sayd (voiced by Susan Blakeslee)
- Scar (voiced by Sarah Douglas)

=== Green Lantern Corps ===
- Mogo (voiced by Kevin Michael Richardson) – A sentient planet that imprisoned criminals on its surface for many years before becoming a Green Lantern.
- Salaak (voiced by Tom Kenny) – A multi-armed Green Lantern senior administrator from Sector 1418.
- Ch'p – A squirrel-like Green Lantern from Sector 1014.
- Tomar-Re (voiced by Jeff Bennett) – A bird-like alien from Sector 2813 and a member of the Green Lantern Honor Guard.
- Guy Gardner (voiced by Diedrich Bader) – Hal's replacement as the Sector Lantern of 2814 after Hal's victory over the Red Lantern Corps and promotion to the Corps Honor Guard. Quickly promoted to Honor Guard duty, Guy is placed in charge of the Corps during the Battle of Ranx, much to Hal's chagrin. He states that after being promoted, he was replaced by John Stewart as the Green Lantern of Earth.
- Sinestro (voiced by Ron Perlman) – The Green Lantern of Sector 1417. Considered one of the greatest Green Lanterns (though unconventional in his tactics), he is Hal Jordan's idol and mentor. He has shown to be willing to kill enemies, in violation of Green Lantern protocols.
- Chaselon (voiced by Tom Kenny) – A crystalline Green Lantern from Sector 1416.
- Iolande (voiced by Tara Strong) – The queen of the planet Betrassus in Sector 1517. When Hal and Kilowog arrived on her planet to recruit its resident Green Lantern, Dulock, to fight the Red Lanterns, one of her generals attempted to force her hand in marriage, which Dulock openly challenged. When her brother Ragnar murdered Dulock to obtain his ring, it instead passed to Iolande, who resolved to remain her planet's queen and its protector.

=== Red Lantern Corps ===
- Atrocitus (voiced by Jonathan Adams) – The leader of the Red Lantern Corps. Due to his planet's destruction, the power of the Red Ring and ruthless crusade of revenge against the Guardians and the Green Lantern Corps, Atrocitus never found true happiness as he was willing to destroy other worlds no matter the cost.
- Zilius Zox (voiced by Tom Kenny) – A sycophant who is almost never far from Atrocitus's side, constantly offering him praise. After Atrocitus is arrested, Zox becomes the new leader of the Red Lanterns.
- Bleez (voiced by Grey DeLisle) – The only female Red Lantern depicted, Bleez comes from a winged race and prefers to rely on her own wings to fly rather than her red ring.
- Veon (voiced by Jason Spisak) – A one-eyed Red Lantern who apparently possesses some measure of psychic ability.
- Skallox (voiced by Kevin Michael Richardson) – A brutish Red Lantern with an ongoing rivalry with Kilowog, his physical equal.
- Cleric Loran (voiced by Corey Burton) – A slug-like alien who was created for the series. Loran does not appear to possess a Power Ring, but maintains a chapel dedicated to Atrocitus on the Red Lantern's base.
- Ragnar (voiced by Will Friedle) – Ragnar is a character who exists in the mainstream of DC Comics, but only becomes a Red Lantern in Green Lantern: The Animated Series. He was responsible for the death of his planet's resident Green Lantern, Dulock, in hopes that his ring would choose him. After failing to become a Green Lantern and seeing his sister Iolande chosen in his place, Ragnar's rage attracts a red power ring and makes him a Red Lantern.

=== Blue Lantern Corps ===
- Saint Walker (voiced by Phil Morris) – The first Blue Lantern in the universe.
- Brother Warth (voiced by Brian George) – An elephant-like alien and the second Blue Lantern.

=== Star Sapphires ===
- Carol Ferris (voiced by Jennifer Hale) – Hal Jordan's love interest and vice president at Ferris Aircraft. In "...In Love and War", she becomes a Star Sapphire and learns Hal Jordan is a Green Lantern. In "New Guy", she breaks up with Hal after she realizes that his duties to the Green Lantern Corp complicated their relationship. In "Love Is a Battlefield", Carol is brought back to Zamaron, decides to keep her ring to honor Ghia'ta, and renews her relationship with Hal.
- Queen Aga'po (voiced by Grey DeLisle) – The queen of Zamaron and leader of the Star Sapphires.
- Ghia'ta (voiced by Jennifer Hale) – A Star Sapphire and Aga'po's niece. She thought love was just a way to help people become happy by bringing loved ones together, but she later learns the true meaning of love and teaches it to her people. In "Love is a Battlefield", she is killed defending Hal from Atrocitus. Aga'po tells Hal, Carol, Razer, and Kilowog that her niece did not die in vain, but to protect the true meaning of love and will be honored as the greatest Star Sapphire of Zamaron, with Carol saying they will remember Ghia'ta as a hero.
- Galia (voiced by Vanessa Marshall) – A Star Sapphire of the same species as Kilowog.

=== Orange Lantern Corps ===
- Larfleeze (voiced by Dee Bradley Baker) – A greedy alien criminal and the sole member of the Orange Lantern Corps.
- Glomulus – A construct of the Orange Light.

=== Machines ===
- Anti-Monitor (voiced by Tom Kenny) – An enormous robot created by a renegade Guardian, the Anti-Monitor has an insatiable hunger and feeds on literally everything. After going rogue upon creation, his creator banished it to an alternate dimension, but this only caused that dimension to be fed on. Eventually, the Anti-Monitor returned to his own dimension, resurrected the Manhunters, and began wreaking havoc before Aya decapitates him and takes over his body.
- Manhunters (voiced by Josh Keaton) - Emotionless robots created by the Guardians to serve as soldiers of the Green Lantern Corps, but they were mistakenly given imperfect programming which caused them to determine that since crime is caused by emotional responses despite there being good, all beings with emotions must be evil. They wiped out an entire sector before the Guardians stopped them, and the Red Lantern Corps was formed to avenge this genocide. The Manhunters were revived by the Anti-Monitor in the second half of the season. After Aya destroys the Anti-Monitor, she names herself the leader of the Manhunters and copies her data into them.
- LANOS (voiced by Brian George) – An artificial intelligence who replaces Aya on the Interceptor after she is removed for dissection. He is known for an annoyingly cheerful personality and recklessness. LANOS sacrifices himself to save the others from Aya by ramming the Interceptor into her and sending them both through hyperspace.

== Development ==
In early stages of production, the show was conceived as a "Bruce Timm-does-CG-project". Phil Kent, chairman and CEO of Time Warner's Turner Networks unit, originally announced that Green Lantern: The Animated Series would be a part of Cartoon Network's original programming. A preview of the show was featured at the 2010 New York Comic Con featuring test footage, characters/story description, and art work. Timm, who produced the entire DC Animated Universe, was attached as producer of the show. Timm was originally reluctant to use CG instead of traditional animation, but eventually came around. A total of 26 episodes were ordered for the first season. By the time of New York Comic Con, thirteen had already been planned, and five had already been recorded. The series was not intended to be an origin story, due to Warner Bros. already releasing a film based on the characters' origin. The series is the first television series by Timm and the first series featuring Green Lantern to be rendered using CG. Originally, Sinestro was not allowed to be used, but this was later overturned in 2013, and Sinestro finally did appear. The producers said that if the series was a hit, other Lanterns like Guy Gardner, John Stewart, and Kyle Rayner might be introduced.

Green Lantern: The Animated Series is an epic space adventure that has something for everyone, and we are delighted for fans to see it November 11 on Cartoon Network. We can't wait to show the world this fresh take on an iconic hero – one that represents not only the first Bruce Timm series to be produced in CG, but also the first time Green Lantern has been rendered in CG.

— Sam Register

== Cast ==
=== Main cast ===
- Josh Keaton – Hal Jordan / Green Lantern, Manhunters
- Grey DeLisle – Aya, Queen Aga'po, Lady Catherine, Amala Rev, Biara Rev, Bleez
- Kevin Michael Richardson – Kilowog, Red Lantern Rings, Dulock, Mogo, Skallox
- Jason Spisak – Razer, Veon

=== Additional voices ===
- Jonathan Adams – Atrocitus
- Ian Abercrombie – Ganthet
- Diedrich Bader – Guy Gardner
- Dee Bradley Baker – Larfleeze
- Jeff Bennett – Tomar-Re, Duke Nigel Thorntonberry
- Susanne Blakeslee – Sayd
- Clancy Brown – General Zartok
- Corey Burton – Cleric Loran, Leph
- John DiMaggio – Kothak
- Sarah Douglas – Scar
- Robin Atkin Downes – Steam Lantern
- Robert Englund – Myglom
- Will Friedle – Ragnar
- Brian George – Appa Ali Apsa, M'Ten, LANOS, Brother Warth
- Jennifer Hale – Carol Ferris / Star Sapphire, Gi'ata
- Tom Kenny – Zilius Zox, Salaak, Byth Rok, Anti-Monitor
- Wayne Knight – Captain Goray
- Juliet Landau – Drusa
- Vanessa Marshall – Galia
- Phil Morris – Saint Walker
- Rob Paulsen – Goggan
- Ron Perlman – Thaal Sinestro
- Kurtwood Smith – Shyir Rev
- Tara Strong – Iolande

== Episodes ==
No.	Title	Directed by	Written by	Original release date	Prod. code
1	"Beware My Power (Part 1)"	Sam Liu	Jim Krieg	March 3, 2012	101
Green Lantern M'Ten is killed by Red Lanterns Razer and Zilius Zox. 18 months later, M'Ten's power ring lands in Oa, homeworld of the Green Lantern Corps. The Guardians of the Universe reveal to Corps members Hal Jordan, Kilowog and Salaak that there are Green Lanterns stationed past the 3600 sectors in Guardian Space, which is called Frontier Space, and that those Lanterns are being killed. Hal argues that they should be saved, but the Guardians disagree, as it would take 18 months to reach them. Guardian Ganthet shows Hal and Kilowog the "Interceptor", a prototype ship that can theoretically reach Frontier Space in minutes. Hal and Kilowog break into it, meet its navigational computer, Aya, and blast off, while being pursued by the Guardians. After arriving in Frontier Space, Hal and Kilowog save Green Lantern Shyir Rev from Razer and Zox. This battle makes Hal vow to stop the Red Lanterns.
2	"Beware My Power (Part 2)"	Rick Morales	Ernie Altbacker	March 10, 2012	102
A Red Lantern drone attacks and damages the Interceptor's hyperdrive, leaving Hal and Kilowog stuck in Frontier Space while it is being repaired. Shyir's state continues to worsen, so they take him to his home planet. Atrocitus, leader of the Red Lantern Corps, sends his ship Shard after them and drops a device called a Liberator on the planet. Atrocitus warns the colonists to turn in the Green Lanterns or else the Liberator will destroy the planet. Razer activates the Liberator after Atrocitus threatens him. Hal battles Atrocitus and Zox, while Kilowog and Shyir try to disarm the Liberator. The device activates, so Shyir sacrifices himself to delay its explosion and Kilowog leaves to save the colonists. When the planet blows up, Razer tries to guilt Hal into killing him, but Hal decides to keep him alive, removes his ring and imprisons him in the Interceptor. Hal and Kilowog bring the colonists to a new planet, which they plan to name after Shyir.
3	"Razer's Edge"	Sam Liu	Eugene Son	March 17, 2012	103
Failing to convince Razer to join their cause, Hal and Kilowog bring him to the Spider Guild prison, run by Warden Myglom. While leaving, they catch an escapee named Goggan in their ship. They learn from him that the Guild tortures its prisoners and decide to investigate. The Guild later notices them and quickly subdues them, after their rings stop working due to a mysterious yellow crystal placed around the prison. Meanwhile, Razer gets put in a device that endlessly replays his worst memory: the death of his wife Ilana. Aya electronically leaves the Interceptor, convinces Razer to help Hal and Kilowog, and frees him. Razer saves the Lanterns and together they defeat the Guild. Hal assigns Goggan to temporarily run the prison while the Guardians send a new warden. He then announces that Razer will be coming with them and gives him his ring back.
4	"Into the Abyss"	Rick Morales	Matt Wayne	March 24, 2012	104
Hal answers the distress call of Captain Goray, who is carrying precious cargo and slowly falling into a pinhole. When they arrive, all their towing methods prove ineffective due to the pinhole's gravitational pull. After discovering Goray's cargo is eggs, they decide to restart the engine and save the entire ship. Hal and Razer fly to the engine room while pursued by mysterious bugs that are ineffective to Green Lanterns. They discover the engine is frozen, but the bugs start to heat it back up. The bugs turn out to be robots controlled by Aya. The engines turn back online, and Hal slingshots the ship using the pinhole's gravitational pull to escape. He thanks Aya for helping them, but reprimands her for abandoning the ship. Aya says that Green Lanterns save lives no matter what. Kilowog says that Aya cannot be a Lantern because she is a computer and does not have a physical body. Aya uses the bugs to assemble a makeshift body, much to Kilowog's disarray.
5	"Heir Apparent"	Sam Liu	Jennifer Keene	March 31, 2012	105
Looking for help against the Red Lanterns, the team lands on planet Betrassus and meets Green Lantern Dulok. He plans to join them after fighting for the hand of the newly-elected queen, Iolande. His opponent is the violent warrior Kothak. The day of the fight, Dulok does not arrive and Hal steps in for him. While he prepares, Razer and Aya look for Dulok and discover his dead body without his ring. Hal and Kothak start fighting but stop when Kilowog suddenly seems to choke and collapse dead. His ring leaves his finger and goes to Iolande's brother Ragnar, who boasts that he killed Dulok and Kilowog to inherit their power. When Dulok's ring did not come to him, he poisoned Kilowog's drink. His plan fails, as Kilowog only pretended to be dead to get a confession. Ragnar kidnaps Iolande and tries to escape. After cornering Ragnar, Hal realizes that Iolande has Dulok's ring and she uses it to subdue Ragnar. As Ragnar is taken to prison, Kothak recognizes Iolande as a great leader. She denies Hal's request to join him, saying her duty is to her people, but thanks him for his help and kisses him goodbye. Note: This episode is directly based on the plot of Green Lantern Corps (vol. 2) #2–3, by writter Dave Gibbons and artist Patrick Gleason. It is the first story in the series to be a direct retelling of a comic book plot.
6	"Lost Planet"	Rick Morales	Michael F. Ryan	April 7, 2012	106
The Interceptor crew follows Shyir's Green Lantern ring and reaches Mogo, a mysterious planet that will soon be crushed by an asteroid. While looking for the ring, they meet a group of castaways that are trapped on the planet. Razer also finds a mysterious man named Saint Walker. They start fighting and Razer is easily defeated. Walker warns Razer that his rage will be his doom and gives him Shyir's ring. The castaways turn out to be criminals, who corrupt Aya and take over the Interceptor. The crew, with apparent help from the planet itself, re-take the ship and prepare to leave before the asteroid hits. Hal, however, realizes that the ring has chosen the planet. He digs a hole into the planet's core and throws the ring into it. A green laser shoots up from the hole and destroys the asteroid. Mogo reveals its sentience, thanks the crew and promises to keep the prisoners contained until they reform. Note: This episode is loosely based on "Mogo Doesn't Socialize" from Green Lantern #188 by Alan Moore and Dave Gibbons.
7	"Reckoning"	Sam Liu	Ernie Altbacker	April 14, 2012	107
The Interceptor crew reach Shard and learn its shield comes down momentarily when it dumps their garbage. Realizing his ring is dying, Razer scolds the rest and leaves, sabotaging the Interceptor as cover. He heads to Shard, reveals to the other Red Lanterns that he survived and charges his ring. He then tries to kill Atrocitus, but fails. Hal and Kilowog infiltrate Shard and learn that Atrocitus formed the Red Lantern Corps after the Guardians' robot army, the Manhunters, destroyed his entire sector. Aya frees Razer, but is discovered by Atrocitus. Razer recharges his ring and joins Hal and Kilowog in battling the Red Lanterns. Atrocitus challenges Razer to a fight to reclaim the broken Aya. Razer fights Atrocitus again and gets a sudden power boost when Atrocitus revealed he killed his wife. Aya convinces Razer not to kill him and the crew leaves with Atrocitus's battery. Once in the Interceptor, Aya reveals she was able to download info from Shard's database and discovers that the Red Lanterns have a massive armada.
8	"Fear Itself"	Rick Morales	Mark Hoffmeier	April 21, 2012	108
Hal and Kilowog land on a habitable planet to look for food. While there, Kilowog finds the Zor, a village of natives who use a yellow crystal called Orrum for weapons and armor. Meanwhile, Hal discovers the Nidara, another group of aliens that look like floating jellyfish. The Zor and Nidara come into conflict because the Nidara constantly try to take away the Orrum, which the natives view as the Nidara are taking away a vital piece of their life. Hal realizes the Orrum is the same crystal from the Spider Guild prison, which de-powers Green Lantern rings and causes fear when in close contact with people. The Nidara, who are immune to the Orrum's effects, are trying to remove the Orrum from the Zor and save them from its influence. Kilowog, who is under the Orrum's influence, battles the Nidara with the Zor. Hal is able to snap Kilowog out of his trance. The Nidara save the Zor from the Orrum's influence. Hal and Kilowog leave, but Kilowog leaves upset after forming a connection with one of the Zor, Galia.
9	"...In Love and War"	Sam Liu	Andrew Robinson	April 28, 2012	109
The Interceptor's crew meets two Star Sapphires, Queen Aga'po and Ghia'ta. They invite the crew to their homeworld of Zamaron, where Aga'po reveals that she is the same race as the Guardians, but left, due to them suppressing their emotions. Sensing Kilowog's heartbreak, she sends a Star Sapphire ring to Galia. After being reunited, Galia encases Kilowog in a crystal. Aga'po also sends a Star Sapphire ring to Carol, Hal's one true love. Carol also reunites with Hal, but gets jealous when she sees Ghia'ta. Carol attacks Hal, but she calms when she realizes Hal still loves her. Carol accepts who Hal really is and returns the Star Sapphire ring, as wanting to keep Hal would be selfishness, not love. Meanwhile, Aga'po tries to kill Razer, but Hal, Aya, and a rescued Kilowog arrive to save him. The Interceptor crew then escapes from Zamaron, with some help from Ghia'ta, who promises to teach the Sapphires what she learned from Hal and Carol's relationship.
10	"Regime Change"	Rick Morales	Josh Hamilton	May 5, 2012	110
A group of Red Lanterns arrive on Betrassus and give Ragnar a ring of his own. Together, they take over the planet, imprison Iolande and place a Liberator on Betrassus. Ganthet admits to Hal and Kilowog that the Manhunters destroyed Atrocitus's sector. He tries to convince the Guardians to admit their faults. However, Guardian Appa Ali Apsa banishes him from Oa. Hal and Kilowog free Iolande and start fighting on the Liberator, but the Red Lanterns easily overpower them. As Gantlet leaves Oa, he is secretly brought back by Guardian Sayd and he activates a device placed on the Interceptor. Hal's power battery turns blue and supercharges the Green Lanterns while depowering the Red Lanterns, allowing the heroes to defeat the Red Lanterns and remove the Liberator. The blue lantern then flies off. Ganthet thanks Sayd for her help and resumes his exile, saying that he knows the Green Lanterns succeeded because he feels hope. Note: This episode was dedicated to the memory of Ian Abercrombie, voice of Ganthet, who died in January 2012, before the episode aired.
11	"Flight Club"	Sam Liu	Michael F. Ryan	May 12, 2012	111
Appa Ali Apsa tasks the Interceptor to find and destroy the Lighthouse, a device that the Red Lanterns can use to easily get into Guardian Space. He also tasks them to find Green Lantern Tahvaarus, who discovered the Lighthouse years before and was last seen in the Spider Guild prison. The crew travel to the prison and discover Tahvaarus is dead. Before he died, he left a message to find Byth Rok, a Thanagarian prisoner who is the only one alive to know the code to the Lighthouse. In the Thanagarian sector of the prison, Byth is held captive by his own kind. The crew frees Byth and tricks him into giving them the code. The Red Lanterns appear and a battle ensues, but the crew narrowly escapes. Byth steals Tahvaarus's ring and flies away with the other Thanagarians, but the Red Lanterns quickly capture them.
12	"Invasion"	Rick Morales	Ernie Altbacker	May 19, 2012	112
The heroes arrive to the Lighthouse's location and use the code to activate it, but soon discover that the Red Lanterns have already occupied the Lighthouse, having gotten the code from Byth. With the Red Lantern armada on its way, Aya sneaks in and turns the Lighthouse's defense system against the Red Lanterns, forcing them to retreat. Razer rigs the Lighthouse to explode remotely when Atrocitus appears, though Atrocitus survives and takes control of the Interceptor and Aya's body. He then warps to Guardian Space, leaving Hal, Kilowog, and Razer stranded. He then uses Liberators to blow a massive hole in the maelstrom surrounding the Lighthouse, allowing the armada to easily pass through. Meanwhile, Mogo leads Saint Walker to the top of a mountain to find a weapon that can stop the Red Lanterns: a blue power battery and a blue ring.
13	"Homecoming"	Sam Liu	Jim Krieg	May 26, 2012	113
With the Red Lanterns on their way, Kilowog elects to stay behind to hold off the armada. Wanting to find a quick way to Oa, Hal and Razer go to Zamaron and ask Queen Aga'po for her help. She opens a portal to Earth, but warns Hal that it is unstable. Hal arrives on Earth and reunites with Carol. Having lost his memory, Carol helps him remember and he flies to Oa. Meanwhile, Atrocitus arrives on Oa and begins wreaking havoc on the Guardians. As Kilowog faces the armada, he is assisted by Mogo and Saint Walker, who supercharges Kilowog's ring. Razer arrives on Oa through a Zamaron portal and frees Aya from her mind control. Hal confronts Atrocitus and the two brawl. Though initially losing, Hal eventually overcomes Atrocitus. Before Zilius can retreat, Hal offers to help Zilius rebuild the Forgotten Zone and fix the Guardians' mistake. As the Guardians make a deal with Zilius, the Guardians thank Hal and Atrocitus is imprisoned on Oa.
14	"The New Guy"	Rick Morales	Tom Sheppard	September 29, 2012	114
On the planet Biot, the Anti-Monitor arrives from an alternate universe and reactivates an army of old Manhunters. After being gone for months fighting the Red Lanterns, Hal returns to Earth and finds out that he has been replaced at work by another pilot. His sector also has a new Green Lantern: Guy Gardner. This makes Hal angry, and the two Lanterns start fighting but stop after learning that someone is trapped in a cave. They investigate and discover an old Manhunter temple, with three active robots still inside. Hal and Guy decide to work together and manage to destroy the Manhunters. After Hal misses another date because of that mission, Carol breaks up with him. Disappointed, he is then summoned to Oa, where the Guardians decide to name Guy the new Green Lantern of Earth's Sector. Due to his victory against the Red Lanterns, Hal is promoted to Honor Guard of the Green Lantern Corps and will patrol all of Guardian Space.
15	"Reboot"	Sam Liu	Mark Hoffmeier	October 6, 2012	115
Wanting to fight back against the Manhunters, the Guardians grant Hal the authority to assemble a small team of Lanterns, as well as the use of the Interceptor. After learning that Aya is scheduled to be dissected soon, Hal and Kilowog sneak into Oa's science building and save her. Meanwhile, Green Lantern Tomar-Re finds an outside force controlling the Manhunters and detects an anti-matter pulse coming from Biot. The three Lanterns head there and discover a Manhunter graveyard and factory. With Aya's help, the Lanterns destroy the factory, but the Anti-Monitor appears and reveals his intention to turn the entire universe into anti-matter and consume it. He attacks the crew, forcing them to retreat. Hal stays, deciding to protect the rest from the Anti-Monitor, and presumably dies in the process.
16	"Steam Lantern"	Rick Morales	Ernie Altbacker	January 5, 2013	116
Hal is blasted into an alternate universe by the Anti-Monitor and lands on a planet where steam still rules as a power source. There, he meets Catherine and her boyfriend, the superhero "Steam Lantern". Their enemy, Nigel Fortenberry, is a brilliant inventor and a supposed ally of the Anti-Monitor. In reality, Nigel was against the Anti-Monitor and sent him back to Hal's universe through a crack in the space-time continuum. The public believes that Steam Lantern did that and he never corrected them. Nigel's robots attack and force Hal and the couple to surrender. Nigel then forces Steam Lantern to confess his fraudulence. To everyone's surprise, the public still praises Steam Lantern, who they consider a hero. Nigel realizes the error of his ways. As a consequence of the Anti-Monitor's attacks, the planet's sun goes out and the world begins to collapse. Nigel and the couple open the crack while Hal uses his ring to widen the rift and bring the planet into his universe. Note: Due to an abrupt schedule change which postponed the DC Nation block, the episode was briefly released on iTunes on October 14, 2012, one day after it initially meant to air. It aired on Cartoon Network India on December 23 the same year.
17	"Blue Hope"	Sam Liu	Jeremy Adams	January 12, 2013	117
The Interceptor crew arrives on the planet Odym and meets Ganthet, Saint Walker and Brother Warth, and Razer, who came to the Blue Lanterns for help in removing his rage. Ganthet takes the Lanterns to the Blue Lantern central power battery and ignites it, spreading the blue light across the galaxy and causing the Green Lanterns' rings to become supercharged. It also supercharges three other Manhunters flying nearby, who come to Odym and demand the central battery. It is revealed that the robots' faulty programming gave them the goal of eradicating all emotional beings in the universe, who they deem evil and imperfect. The Lanterns are initially overpowered, but with the help of Saint Walker and Razer, the central battery is turned off. This turns the Manhunters back to normal and the Lanterns destroy them. In the end, Razer rejoins the Interceptor crew and Ganthet decides to keep the blue battery off until the Manhunter situation is over. Note: This episode aired on Cartoon Network India on December 30, 2012 before its original airdate in U.S.
18	"Prisoner of Sinestro"	Rick Morales	Mark Hoffmeier	January 19, 2013	118
The Guardians task Green Lantern Thaal Sinestro with capturing Neuroxis, a known fugitive, and bringing him back to Oa. After taking custody of the criminal in a Spider Guild ship, Sinestro is attacked by the Guild itself and asks the Interceptor crew to rescue him. The Warden sets the ship to self-destruct and Sinestro and the Interceptor crew barely escape. Onboard the Interceptor, Sinestro starts attacking the crew, before being subdued by Hal. One at a time, everyone but Aya starts having similar outbursts. They learn that Neuroxis is a mind jumper and can take control of any Lantern. Sinestro comes up with a plan: if the room they are in is purged of oxygen, the body Neuroxis is possessing will suffocate, since Neurosis cannot use their rings. This will force him to return to his body in the ship's prison. The plan works and Sinestro confronts Neuroxis, revealing that he sabotaged the oxygen in the prison. Neuroxis suffocates, and Sinestro covers up his actions when the other Lanterns come, saying it was for the best. This disappoints Hal.
19	"Loss"	Sam Liu	Michael F. Ryan	January 26, 2013	119
On Ysmault, Guardian Science Director Scar negotiates with Zilius Zox, new leader of the Red Lanterns, in their efforts to rebuild the Forgotten Zone. She discovers an active Manhunter on the planet, and, knowing it could upset the peace discussions, calls the Interceptor to disable it quietly. This plan fails, Zilius notices the heroes and believes they are plotting against the Red Lanterns. As he accuses them of treachery, the Anti-Monitor arrives in Frontier Space. Scar reveals that the Anti-Monitor was created by Krona, a renegade Guardian, to explore the secrets of the universe. Believing himself to be superior to anyone else, the Anti-Monitor wants to consume the universe and turn it into antimatter. He sends Manhunters after the Interceptor, forcing the Lanterns to head out and fight. Trying to save Razer, Aya is struck by the Anti-Monitor's beam. Razer confesses his love for her while she vanishes, much to his sorrow. The heroes retreat as the Anti-Monitor continues to pursue them.
20	"Cold Fury"	Rick Morales	Ernie Altbacker	February 2, 2013	120
Scar joins the battle and seemingly dies by the Anti-Monitor's beam. As he attempts to destroy the Interceptor, Red Lantern reinforcements arrive on Shard and begin attacking, but the Anti-Monitor starts to destroy Shard, forcing the Interceptor and the Red Lanterns to retreat. The Interceptor crew finds out that Aya is alive, using the remains of a broken Manhunter as her body. She confronts Razer about his confessed feelings for her, and he denies them to be true, which breaks Aya's heart. As the Green and Red Lanterns begin battling the Anti-Monitor's forces, Aya, heartbroken and overwhelmed, decides to shut down all emotions to be useful in the fight. She then absorbs all of the green energy of the Interceptor, disabling the ship. In an emotionless rampage, a supercharged Aya flies straight into the Anti-Monitor and blows his head off. As the Lanterns think they are victorious, Aya takes over the Anti-Monitor's body and absorbs his powers. Announcing her rejection of emotional beings, she takes over the Manhunters, and sends the disabled Interceptor floating away.
21	"Babel"	Sam Liu	Charlotte Fullerton & Kevin Rubio	February 9, 2013	121
The Interceptor crash-lands on an unknown planet and its toxic atmosphere starts leaking into the ship. With their rings almost out of power and their power batteries temporarily incapacitated, the crew is forced to leave the ship and go to a nearby city. On the way there, their rings run out of power. With their universal translators offline, the three have difficulty understanding each other, since they all speak different languages. While driving a stolen vehicle to the Interceptor, they are caught, captured and forced into a gladiatorial arena. Not being able to strategize with each other, the crew is easily beat by a giant monster. Hal however notices that the monster has a Manhunter head on it, and since those robots are powered by green energy, he can use it to charge his ring. Hal and Kilowog get the head, recharge their rings and defeat the monster. Back on the Interceptor, Razer recharges his ring and helps repair the ship, before leaving to find Aya.
22	"Love Is a Battlefield"	Rick Morales	Jennifer Keene	February 16, 2013	122
Aya and the Manhunters attack the Star Sapphires' homeworld, believing that love is a dangerous emotion which must be eliminated. Ghia'ta tries to convince her that love has value and mentions Carol Ferris, who taught her a lot about the subject. Aya summons Carol to Zamaron, so she can make the case for love to prevail. Carol says that love is stronger than hate, so Aya decides to put it to the test. She brings Atrocitus from Oa's ScienCells and gives him his ring back. Carol regains her Star Sapphire ring and is forced to fight Atrocitus to the death, determining the fate of Zamaron. Being severely outmatched, Carol summons Hal Jordan. Hal and Carol battle Atrocitus, but are both incapacitated. As Atrocitus is about to kill Hal, Ghia'ta sacrifices herself to save him. Her death gives Hal and Carol the resolve to defeat Atrocitus. Unmoved by the events of the fight, Aya decides to find a way to eliminate all emotional life at once and leaves Zamaron. Aga'po thanks the humans. Carol decides to keep the Star Sapphire ring in Ghia'ta's honor and gets back together with Hal, before returning to Earth.
23	"Larfleeze"	Sam Liu	Ernie Altbacker	February 23, 2013	123
The Interceptor crew try to come up with a way to stop Aya. Razer suggests using a battery from the Orange Lanterns, an organization that vanished on the planet Okarra. They reach Okarra and find the battery, but are attacked by the Orange Lantern Larfleeze. They escape with the battery. The orange battery starts to corrupt Hal and turns him into an insane Orange Lantern. Realizing the battery is powered by avarice, Kilowog and Razer offer it to Larfleeze in exchange for his help in saving Hal. Larfleeze begrudgingly agrees. Hal fights back against the heroes, not wanting to give up the battery. The fight stops when they discover the stars in the sky going out and realize that Aya is vaporizing star systems. Kilowog and Razer use this revelation to snap Hal out of his greedy trance, and Hal returns the battery to Larfleeze. The Interceptor leaves Okarra, with the crew remaining hopeful that Aya can be saved.
24	"Scarred"	Rick Morales	Jeremy Adams	March 2, 2013	124
Looking to discover Aya's weaknesses, the crew sneak into Scar's laboratory and discover coordinates to a mysterious planet. Once on the planet, they find a secret laboratory as well as Scar, who managed to escape from the Anti-Monitor. She reveals that she created Aya under the Guardians' orders and combined an AI with the energy from an entity in the Green Lantern Central Power Battery. Aya's first emotions led to disobedience, so Scar shut them down and stored Aya on the Interceptor. Razer plans to appeal to Aya's emotions, while the others use a warhead filled with Orrum to weaken her if she tries to attack. The crew find Aya destroying a planet and Razer tries to appeal to her. Scar activates the warhead early, which causes a massive explosion, but Aya and Razer survive and Aya attacks the Interceptor. Scar teleports away and Hal rigs the ultra-warp to ram into Aya, sending her away.
25	"Ranx"	Sam Liu	Ernie Altbacker	March 9, 2013	125
The Guardians order Hal, Kilowog and Razer to go to the planet Ranx, which Aya's forces are trying to break into. A massive squadron of Green Lanterns, led by Guy Gardner, aids them in the fight against the Manhunters. The Lanterns are easily outmatched by the robots, but Hal, Kilowog and Razer are able to sneak through, using a calming technique from Razer that blocks all emotions. They quickly learn that the planet is under control from the Anti-Monitor's still sentient head. The Anti-Monitor asks for the crew's protection, since there is a cylinder in his head that can make anyone travel to the dawn of time. The crew agree to help, but Aya arrives on Ranx and rips through the Lanterns and Ranx's defenses. She destroys the Anti-Monitor, takes the time displacement cylinder and announces her plan to go to the dawn of time and prevent all natural life from ever occurring. As Aya leaves Ranx, Razer realizes that she must be destroyed.
26	"Dark Matter"	Rick Morales	Jim Krieg	March 16, 2013	126
Hal discovers that the systems Aya destroyed were devoid of life and realizes there is still good in her. While the Green Lantern Corps are fighting her forces, Aya activates the Anti-Monitor's cylinder and opens a portal to the dawn of time. As she starts creating a universe without biological life, Hal tries to reason with her but fails. While she is distracted, Razer tries to kill her. She notices him at the last minute and critically injures him. Realizing what she has done, Aya reverses her tampering to time itself and escapes with her friends as the Big Bang starts. Back in the present, she heals Razer's body. He declares his love for her, and the two reconcile, but the other Manhunters are still attacking and Aya can no longer shut them down. Seeing no other choice, Aya releases a virus that disables every version of her program, including herself. Believing she is not truly dead, Razer decides to search for Aya, and Hal and Kilowog wish him luck. As he flies off into space, a Blue Lantern ring follows Razer.

== Reception ==
=== Critical reception ===
Green Lantern: The Animated Series, since its first showing at the 2011 Comic Con, has received positive reviews. Chris Sims of ComicsAlliance commented that he'd never been a huge fan of Green Lantern, but rather of DC Animated Universe creator Bruce Timm, and when he heard that Timm was producing the series he began looking forward to it, saying that the one-hour premiere "does it right". Tony Guerrero of Comic Vine said it was "a good first episode and definitely worth checking out". Brian Lowry of Variety praised the animation style, saying that "Warner Bros. has gone full bore into the CGI dimension with a bold, sleek design that more than anything resembles The Incredibles".

=== Awards and nominations ===
Award	Category	Result	Note
39th Annie Awards	Best General Audience Animated TV Production	Nominated	
39th Annie Awards	Music In a Television Production – Frederik Wiedmann	Nominated	
40th Annie Awards	Music in an Animated Television/Broadcast Production – Frederik Wiedmann	Nominated	For "Into the Abyss"

== Home media ==
The series was released on DVD in two volumes by Warner Bros. Home Entertainment. The first volume was released on August 28, 2012 and the second volume was released on June 25, 2013. The entire series was released in a Blu-ray set on March 14, 2014, from Warner Archive.

== Other media ==
=== Comic books ===
A series of 15 numbered issues was published between 2011 and 2013. Its 32-paged debut comic, Green Lantern: The Animated Series #0 was released on November 30, 2011, written by Art Baltazar with art by Dario Brizuela. The first issue received mixed to positive reviews, with one reviewer giving a B+ stating it is "good kids material" and "a fun way to introduce new readers, especially younger readers, to the Green Lantern universe without having to worry about the violence level". The issue gathered a high sales debut, with an approximate 13,500 copies sold. A story from one of the issues was included in the DC Nation 2012 Free Comic Book Day comic. Similar with the DC Animated Universe where original characters like Harley Quinn, Renee Montoya and Livewire transitioned into the mainstream DC Universe, Razer and Aya were also integrated into the mainline continuity.

==== Compilations ====
- Green Lantern: The Animated Series (2013-01-09): Includes #0-5.
- Green Lantern: The Animated Volume 2 (2014-01-08): Includes #6-11.

==== Stone Arch Books ====
- Green Lantern The Animated Series True Colors
- Green Lantern The Animated Series Counterfeits
- Green Lantern The Animated Series The Invisible Destroyer
- Green Lantern The Animated Series Bounty Hunter (ISBN 978-1-4342-4835-0/EAN-5 90000)
- Green Lantern The Animated Series Tattooed Man Trouble!
- Green Lantern The Animated Series Trouble in the Arena! (ISBN 978-1-4342-4787-2/EAN-5 90000)
- Green Lantern The Animated Series Hal Versus Atrocitus
- Green Lantern The Animated Series Goldface Attacks!

=== In other media ===
- The Justice League Action episode "Barehanded" introduced a variation of Aya, voiced again by Grey DeLisle. This version is Space Cabbie's navigational computer, before leaving him in search of Hal Jordan.
- Razer appears in the Young Justice episode "Encounter Upon the Razor's Edge!", in which he is shown to be continuing his search for Aya and becomes a hybrid Red/Blue Lantern. Young Justice producer Greg Weisman stated that Green Lantern: The Animated Series is canon "adjacent" to Young Justice, meaning a similar but distinct version of events happened in both shows.
- Aya and Razer as a Blue Lantern appear in Justice League: Crisis on Infinite Earths, with Aya voiced by Jennifer Hale and Razer voiced again by Jason Spisak.

=== Licensed merchandise ===
DC Direct released two limited edition maquettes, to accompany the official release of Green Lantern: The Animated Series in spring 2012. The first maquette is Hal Jordan, sculpted by Paul Harding, and was released on March 7. The other, Atrocitus, is sculpted by Dave Cortez and was released on May 23. Mattel had plans to manufacture action figures based on the series in 2011, but none were produced.

=== Video games ===
A horizontal shooter starring Hal Jordan was released in 2015 at the Cartoon Network site.

== Soundtrack ==
La-La Land Records, the record label behind the Batman: The Animated Series soundtracks, released the show's soundtrack on July 31, 2012. The label would later release a second volume of music from the series on July 2, 2013.
