= Manhunters (DC Comics) =

Fictional race of robots

- The Manhunters as depicted in History of the DC Universe #1 (January 1987). Art by George Pérez.

Publication information
- Publisher: DC Comics
- First appearance: 1st Issue Special #5 (August 1975)
- Created by: Jack Kirby

Characteristics
- Place of origin: Biot, Orinda
- Inherent abilities: Skilled marksmanship

The Manhunters are a fictional race of extraterrestrial robots that appear in American comic books published by DC Comics. They are described to be the first attempt at a police force created by the Guardians of the Universe and have since antagonized the Green Lantern Corps and the Justice League.

The Manhunters have appeared in various media outside comics, including animated series and video games. In live-action, the Manhunters appeared in the DC Universe (DCU) television series Lanterns.

== Publication history ==
The broader history behind the alien robot species covered in this article was introduced in Justice League of America #140 (March 1977), in a story by Steve Englehart and Dick Dillin.

== Fictional character biography ==
=== Interstellar police ===
Manhunters and Guardians of the Universe, as seen in Secret Origins (vol. 2) #22 (January 1988), artist Howard Simpson.

The Manhunters are the first attempt of the Guardians of the Universe to create an interstellar police force that could combat evil all over the cosmos. Their name and much of their code of behavior is modeled by the Guardians of the Universe on the Manhunters of Ma'aleca'andra (Mars). As the Manhunters become more intelligent and self-aware, they begin to resent the limitations placed upon them by the Guardians; in their eyes, justice is less important than the hunting and punishment of those they deem wicked.

=== Exile ===
Eventually, the robots conspire to rebel against their masters, but the Guardians defeat and destroy most of them. Those who survive hide away on many planets, slowly rebuilding their forces and spreading their beliefs to others. Since then, the overriding goal of the Manhunters has been to take revenge on the Guardians, as well as on their replacements, the Green Lantern Corps.

The Manhunters infiltrate and liberate many planets disguised as living beings and create a "Cult of the Manhunters" that trains others to be their minions. On Mars, the people of that world start a group of Manhunters based on the lessons of preserving justice taught unto them by the Manhunters and even erect a temple based on the appearance of their inspiration. On Earth, most of the Manhunters' agents are unaware that their masters are robots, or that their real purposes are not noble. Some of these agents become superheroes also known as Manhunters and wear red and blue costumes patterned after the Manhunters themselves.

The Manhunters are discovered by the Justice League, who seemingly defeats the Manhunter's leader, the Grandmaster. One of their human pawns, Mark Shaw, adopts a new identity as Privateer, but is later discovered to be a criminal posing as a hero.

=== Millennium ===
A Grandmaster from Millennium #1

The Manhunters infiltrate the lives of most superheroes with their agents. They even manage to infiltrate the Olympian Gods, one of their number posing as the goat god Pan. They reveal themselves when a Guardian and a member of the Zamarons try to evolve some humans into becoming the next Guardians of the Universe, during what becomes known as the Millennium crisis. On this occasion, there is a massive counterstrike operation by the heroes against the Manhunters, and it seems that the Grandmaster has finally been destroyed, along with their hidden home planet. Mark Shaw retakes the Manhunter name in the wake of the battle, seeking to redeem both the name and himself.

=== Post-Emerald Twilight ===
Kyle Rayner encounters the Manhunters not long after Hal Jordan's destruction of the Guardians and the Central Power Battery on Oa. The first of the androids encounters Kyle and is almost able to defeat him using brute force until Kyle uses his wits to outsmart and destroy it. The next time, multiple Manhunters appear. They are all sentient individuals, upgraded by a passing alien ship with technology onboard that gives them a hive consciousness. They capture Kyle in an attempt to use his last remaining Green Lantern ring for their purposes. They fail and Kyle manages to escape.

=== Sector 3600 ===
Green Lantern (vol. 4) #12 (July 2006). Manhunter technology. Art by Ivan Reis.

When the Manhunters are replaced by the Green Lantern Corps, they retreat to Biot, their homeworld in Sector 3601, an uncharted area of space incapable of sustaining organic life. Hank Henshaw, the Cyborg Superman, comes to Biot and becomes the Manhunters' new Grandmaster. He uses his mastery over machinery and Kryptonian technology to upgrade the Manhunters with organic enhancements, resulting in behavioral developments such as emotions. They seem to have rebuilt the first Central Power Battery originally destroyed by Hal Jordan (under the influence of Parallax). Henshaw decides not to interfere in the reformation of the Green Lantern Corps after an encounter between a Manhunter and Green Lanterns Hal Jordan and Guy Gardner.

=== Sinestro Corps ===
The Manhunters later resurface as part of the Sinestro Corps. Some of them carry miniature yellow Power Batteries inside them which are used by the Sinestro Corps members to charge their yellow power rings while others still carry the green ones for taking powers from the Green Lanterns' rings.

=== Secret Origin ===
In the Green Lantern: Secret Origin storylines (which revises Hal Jordan's beginnings), it is revealed that the Manhunters suffered a programming glitch that caused them to wipe out all life in space sector 666, believing it to be evil. It is this event that gives rise to the Five Inversions, the only survivors of the massacre, who vow to make the Guardians pay for what their creations had done.

=== Blackest Night ===
During the events of Blackest Night, it is revealed that Amanda Waller and King Faraday have a deactivated Manhunter in their possession, having recovered it after the events of Millennium. Waller sends the Manhunter to assist the Secret Six and the Suicide Squad in their battle with members of the Black Lantern Corps. Waller uses a self-destruct mechanism to destroy the Manhunter, unleashing an explosion of Green Lantern energy that eradicates the Black Lanterns.

=== Brightest Day ===
It is revealed that the programming glitch the Manhunters suffered was caused by Krona to prove to the other Guardians of the Universe that there are flaws in an emotionless police force.

=== The New 52 ===
In 2011, The New 52 rebooted the DC Universe. While running from the Alpha Lanterns, John Stewart and Guy Gardner find dozens of deactivated Manhunters in the Guardian's Ring Foundry. They re-energize the robots using the Foundry essence to fend off the Alphas. However, during the fight, the Manhunters are accidentally fused into a massive bio-mechanic monster. It has since been revealed that the Manhunters were created to apprehend the First Lantern during a time the Maltusians were still trying to harness the Emerald Light of Willpower, which they eventually would use as a source of energy to fuel their efforts to police the cosmos.

== Highmaster ==
The Highmaster

The Highmaster is the supreme Manhunter which appeared on Orinda in Justice League International #10. He resembles a gigantic yellow Manhunter and was destroyed by Hal Jordan and Superman.

== Technology ==
- Manhunter technology has been used in the creation of the OMAC drones. The Kryptonian technology was incorporated into the Manhunters by Hank Henshaw on Biot, which enabled them to use the Central Power Battery on Oa as a power source for the Manhunters.
- Originally, the Manhunters used special energy pistols which were charged by the Green Lanterns which they carried.

== Other versions ==
=== Green Lantern: Earth One ===
The Manhunters appear in Green Lantern: Earth One. Hundreds of years prior, the Manhunters wiped out the majority of the Green Lantern Corps and captured the Central Power Battery, which was assumed destroyed. In a reverse of most versions of their origin story, the Manhunters were created by the Guardians of Oa to replace the Corps, who they felt had become too independent. The Manhunters turn on the Guardians and kill all but one, who flees to an alternate dimension. In the present day, asteroid miner Hal Jordan finds a power ring, which he uses to summon the remaining ring bearers to Oa. By creating a controlled feedback loop between the Central Battery and their rings, the Lanterns destroy the majority of the Manhunters.

=== Star Trek/Green Lantern ===
In the sequel to Star Trek/Green Lantern: The Spectrum War, a year after the Green Lanterns and their allies arrive in the new Star Trek timeline, Saint Walker discovers a Manhunter that crashed on a distant moon. The age of the impact suggests that this Manhunter is native to the Star Trek universe rather than the Lanterns' home universe.

== In other media ==
=== Television ===
- The Manhunters appear in the Justice League episode "In Blackest Night", with their leader voiced by James Remar. These versions were reprogrammed after they proved to be unable to tell the difference between good and evil. After this demotion, the Manhunters secretly plot revenge against the Guardians while continuing to serve them as bodyguards. After distracting the Corps by framing John Stewart for destroying an inhabited planet, the Manhunters invade Oa and usurp the full power of the Central Battery, crippling the Guardians. Stewart defeats them by absorbing their power into his ring while reciting the Corps' oath and discharging it.
- The Manhunters appear in Green Lantern: The Animated Series, voiced by Josh Keaton. They are first seen in the episode "Reckoning", where their history with Atrocitus and their massacre of his species is revealed. Later in the series, the Manhunters become the Anti-Monitor's foot soldiers, viewing all emotion as the source of evil and seeking to exterminate it.
- The Manhunters appear in Lanterns. Prior to the start of the series, Abin Sur rescued the seemingly last surviving Manhunter after the Guardians ordered their extermination for committing genocide against several alien races. The Manhunter, viewing Sur as a threat, fatally wounded him and forced his ship to crash before integrating on Earth under the identity of Zoe Macon. Zoe's grandson Noah Macon (portrayed by Shea Pritchard) is later revealed to be a Manhunter as well.

=== Video games ===
- The Manhunters appear in DC Universe Online, voiced by David Jennison.
- The Manhunters appear in Green Lantern: Rise of the Manhunters, voiced by Fred Tatasciore.

=== Miscellaneous ===
- The Manhunters appear in the Injustice: Gods Among Us prequel comic.
- The Manhunters appear in Smallville Season 11.
