= Kilowog =

Fictional character in DC Comics; member of the Green Lantern Corps

- Kilowog as depicted in Hal Jordan and The Green Lantern Corps #13 (January 2017). Art by Ethan Van Sciver.

Publication information
- Publisher: DC Comics
- First appearance: Green Lantern Corps #201 (June 1986)
- Created by: Steve Englehart; Joe Staton

In-story information
- Full name: Kilowog
- Species: Bolovaxian
- Place of origin: Bolovax Vik
- Team affiliations: Green Lantern Corps; Rocket Red Brigade; Justice League; Justice League Europe
- Partnerships: Hal Jordan; Guy Gardner; John Stewart; Kyle Rayner
- Notable aliases: Dark Lantern
- Abilities: Use of power ring grants: Uniform (suit and mask; Kilowog refuses mask); Flight; Force field; Space travel; Generation of hard-light constructs; Real-time translation of all languages; Bolovaxianite physiology: Superhuman strength, speed, stamina, and durability; Genius-level intellect

Kilowog is a superhero appearing in American comic books published by DC Comics. The character is a member of the Green Lantern Corps.

Kilowog has been substantially adapted into media outside comics, primarily in association with Green Lantern. Michael Clarke Duncan, Kevin Michael Richardson, Dennis Haysbert, and Henry Rollins, among others, have voiced the character in television series and films.

== Publication history ==
Kilowog first appears in Green Lantern Corps #201 and was created by Steve Englehart and Joe Staton.

== Fictional character biography ==
=== Origins ===
A towering alien with a brutish cross of porcine and bull-doggish appearance, Kilowog is renowned throughout the Green Lantern Corps as the primary trainer of the Corps' newest recruits. The Guardians of the Universe recruited Kilowog, a gifted genetic scientist, from the planet Bolovax Vik, located in Space Sector 674. Kilowog was trained by Lantern Ermey (a reference to R. Lee Ermey), who would often use the word "poozer", which means "useless rookie" (a word Kilowog would later adopt, albeit in a friendlier way). In the middle of a particularly arduous training session, Ermey had Kilowog and his fellow rookies help stop an attack on a group of Lanterns, one of whom was the future renegade Sinestro. Ermey, fatally wounded in battle, commended Kilowog on his abilities, telling him that he had the makings of a great leader. In addition to serving with distinction as the Green Lantern of that sector, Kilowog also began to spend extensive periods of time on the Green Lantern Corps' home planet of Oa instructing new recruits on how to handle and best utilize their power rings. In this capacity, Kilowog acted as the first trainer to a young Hal Jordan. Kilowog and his new recruit helped the Guardians confront Abin Sur's murderer, Legion.

=== Crisis ===
During the Crisis on Infinite Earths, Bolovax Vik was destroyed. This was a powerful blow to Kilowog, as his species had a highly communal lifestyle, and to be alone was one of the worst things imaginable. Kilowog manages to rescue the entire population of his homeworld by storing their life essence within his ring.

Crisis on Infinite Earths saw the Guardians divided over how to battle the Anti-Monitor, with 14 of the Guardians being killed in the ensuing battle. The Corps also suffer hundreds of casualties. The Guardians decide to end their direct leadership of the Corps and leave for another dimension with the Zamarons.

=== Earth years ===
Before leaving, the Guardians inform the remaining Green Lanterns that the Corps was now theirs to administer; they were no longer bound by their former assignment to one particular Space Sector and could deploy themselves as they saw fit. Adrift following the destruction of his Sector and the end of his role training new Green Lanterns for the Guardians, Kilowog relocates to Earth with Hal Jordan and several other Lanterns.

While his appearance at first frightens most humans, Kilowog briefly becomes a celebrity following his defeat of the villain Black Hand on live television in a battle over Anaheim Stadium. This goodwill is soon squandered, though, when he is approached by a KGB agent and invited to live in the Soviet Union. During his time in the Soviet Union, Kilowog is instrumental in the creation of its first super-powered force, the Rocket Red Brigade. Kilowog ultimately becomes disenchanted with the Soviet Union and the flawed communist nations of Earth.

While adventuring with the Green Lantern Corps of Earth, Kilowog finds a world in Space Sector 872 which would make a suitable "Bolovax Vik II". Moved to action, he reconstitutes the entire population of his world, some 16 billion beings, whose consciousnesses had been stored in his ring. Soon afterward, the world is obliterated by Sinestro, with the Bolovax Vikians being permanently killed. Kilowog is emotionally devastated, but is helped in recovery by fellow Green Lantern Arisia Rrab, to whom he confesses his love.

Shortly after this adventure, the Corps was destroyed when they voted as a body to execute the captured Sinestro for crimes against the universe; this set in motion a chain of events that led to the dissolution of almost all power rings.

Kilowog as the Dark Lantern. Art by Ariel Olivetti.

=== Emerald Twilight ===
During the Emerald Twilight storyline, numerous Green Lanterns are sent to stop the supposedly insane Hal Jordan. The very last Green Lantern to oppose Jordan was Kilowog himself. He attempted to prevent Jordan from entering and absorbing the power of the Great Battery itself, but is unsuccessful. Jordan kills Kilowog, then takes the energies of the Great Battery.

Some of the surviving Green Lanterns band together as a group called the Brotherhood of the Cold Flame. They tap into arcane forces to summon Kilowog's soul, convert him into the Dark Lantern, and send him to attack Jordan. When Jordan becomes the Spectre, he convinces his old friend Tom Kalmaku to help correct his sins against the Green Lantern Corps. Kalmaku uses Jordan's old power ring to rebuild Oa, allowing Kilowog's spirit to rest. Soon after this, Kilowog is resurrected by Kyle Rayner and Ganthet.

=== The New Corps ===
After the reformation of the Corps, Kilowog retakes the role of Green Lantern drill sergeant, training new recruits under the Guardians of the Universe. In Infinite Crisis, Kilowog and Kyle Rayner played a key role in the Rann–Thanagar War and its aftermath.

In Superman/Batman #30, Kilowog is deeply affected by a force that has turned most of the superpowered aliens allied with Earth hostile against all humans. He, or the force controlling him, attempts to violently sway Superman into hating all humans, but Superman does not fall for it. It is later revealed that Kilowog and other alien heroes are being affected by Despero and an alien armada. The threat is swiftly neutralized by Superman and Batman.

=== "Blackest Night" ===
During the 2009 "Blackest Night" storyline, Oa is invaded by a swarm of black power rings, which turn all the deceased Lanterns in the Oan crypt into Black Lanterns, who promptly attack the living Lanterns. Kilowog is attacked by the reanimated Ermey, who berates him for not preventing his death, and for saving the life of Sinestro, citing the deaths Sinestro had caused as being Kilowog's fault. He also torments Kilowog over the death of the current class of Green Lantern rookies, whom Ermey himself has just killed. Gaining the upper hand, Ermey attempts to rip out Kilowog's heart, but is interrupted by the announcement that Black Lanterns' rings have reached one hundred percent power. The Black Lanterns are given new instructions to devour the Central Power Battery. Kilowog joins the Green Lanterns in their attempt to protect the battery.

=== "War of the Green Lanterns" ===
In 2011 storyline "War of the Green Lanterns", Kilowog and Arisia Rrab accompany Guy Gardner on a mission to the 'unexplored sectors'. When Krona launches his attack on the Green Lantern Corps by infecting the power battery with Parallax, Kilowog is the only alien Lantern not to fall under Krona's influence due to his past experience with the entity. Krona deduces the reasons for Kilowog's resistance, forcibly placing a new ring on his finger to bring him under his control.

Following the war, Kilowog briefly attempts to resign from the Corps after the Guardians discharge Hal Jordan and allow Sinestro to at least provisionally remain a Lantern, but is convinced to rethink his decision by Salaak due to the obvious upheaval the Corps will have to undergo in future due to the destruction of Mogo. Kilowog instead retires from his duties as a drill instructor, which is taken over by Stel.

=== The New 52 ===
In 2011 DC Comics cancelled its entirely line of monthly comics, and restarted it with 52 new titles, featuring a rebooted continuity, an endeavor called the New 52. In this new continuity, Kilowog is back to being drill instructor of the Green Lantern Corps, and is part of the team that breaks John Stewart out of prison when the Alpha Lanterns sentence him to death. He and Salaak have also uncovered the Guardians' plans regarding the Third Army. Later when the Guardians attempt to lure their Green Lantern members to Oa under a fake inoculation treatment for the Third Army so they would be assimilated into it, Kilowog by then had secretly contacted trusted members within the corps and assembled them into a small army to face the Guardians. By having the now powerless Guy Gardner serve as a distraction, Kilowog used the opportunity to seize control of the Central Power Battery and not only freed the Lantern members the Guardians immobilized, but also ended the communication blackout allowing him to warn the approaching members of the Guardians deceit.

Kilowog stays with the Lanterns through the destruction and overthrow of the Guardians. He accepts the leadership of Hal Jordan. Despite knowing use of the lantern power endangers the universe, Kilowog volunteers to fight back when the actions of the New Gods endanger all ring wielders.

== Powers and abilities ==
As a Green Lantern, Kilowog possesses the same power ring and power battery used by all Green Lanterns. The Great Power Battery, located on Oa, is the repository for billions of years' worth of willpower in energy form. This energy has been harnessed and focused by the Guardians and is tapped by each GL's power battery. This in turns feeds it to their individual power rings. By applying willpower and concentration, the ring can accomplish anything of which the wielder can conceive, and is therefore as limited or limitless in abilities as the wielder. In Kilowog's case, he has shown an affinity for creating astoundingly complex machinery using the ring. In terms of combat, Kilowog tends to eschew the "giant boxing glove" fighting style of Hal Jordan and mainly uses his ring to fly and to absorb any enemy's attacks long enough for him to get close enough to batter them into unconsciousness.

In addition to his power ring, Kilowog possesses the natural super strength and durability of his species, as well as a powerful intellect that surpasses many of his fellow corpsmen. Under mind control, Kilowog even manages to combine all of these abilities to easily hold his own against Superman.

== Other versions ==
=== Elseworlds ===
Kilwog appeared in various Elseworlds tales: including JLA: The Nail, its sequel, Batman: In Darkest Knight, and Superman: Last Son of Earth.

=== Flashpoint ===
In the alternate timeline of the Flashpoint event, Kilowog is killed by Nekron.

=== Fourth Reich ===
In an alternate future where the Earth is controlled by Nazi supermen, Kilowog is one of the thousands of Green Lanterns to participate in a rescue mission. All who participate are killed.

=== Planetary ===
In an alternate universe ruled by evil versions of the 'Planetary' heroes, Kilowog's corpse is one of many Green Lanterns on display in the Planetary headquarters.

=== Earth One ===
In the alternate universe of Earth One, Kilowog is a scientist living on Bolovax Vik, one of the few independent planets left in explored space, at the fringes of the Manhunters' sphere of influence. He is the latest in a long line of self-proclaimed Green Lanterns and protectors of Bolovax.

=== Absolute Universe ===
An alternate universe version of Kilowog appears in Absolute Green Lantern. This version is a member of the Blackstars who is later killed by Tomar-Re.

== In other media ==
=== Television ===
Kilowog as he appears in Justice League.

- A hologram of Kilowog appears in the Superman: The Animated Series episode "In Brightest Day..."
- Kilowog appears in Justice League (2001), voiced by Dennis Haysbert.
- Kilowog appears in the Duck Dodgers episode "The Green Loontern", voiced by John DiMaggio.
- Kilowog makes a non-speaking cameo appearance in Justice League Unlimited episode "The Return".
- Kilowog appears in Batman: The Brave and the Bold, voiced by Diedrich Bader.
- Kilowog appears in Green Lantern: The Animated Series, voiced by Kevin Michael Richardson. This version travels with Hal Jordan and series-original characters Aya and Razer on the starship Interceptor.
- Kilowog appears in the Mad segment "Does Someone Have to GOa?", voiced by Gary Anthony Williams.
- Kilowog appears in Teen Titans Go!, voiced by Scott Menville.
- Kilowog makes a cameo appearance in the Justice League Action episode "Follow That Space Cab!" via a photograph.
- Kilowog appears in DC Super Hero Girls, voiced by Jason Spisak.
- Kilowog appears in Young Justice, voiced again by Kevin Michael Richardson.
- Kilowog will appear in My Adventures with Green Lantern.

=== Film ===
==== Live-action ====
Kilowog as he appeared in Green Lantern

- Kilowog appears in Green Lantern, portrayed by Spencer Wilding and voiced by Michael Clarke Duncan.
- Kilowog makes a cameo appearance in an additional post-credits scene filmed for Justice League (2017), but was ultimately cut.
  - Kilowog's body appears in a vision that Cyborg has during Zack Snyder's Justice League.

==== Animation ====
- Kilowog appears in Green Lantern: First Flight, voiced by Michael Madsen.
- Kilowog appears in Green Lantern: Emerald Knights, voiced by Henry Rollins. This version was previously trained by Sergeant Deegan and inherited his position after he was killed fighting the Khunds.
- Kilowog makes a cameo appearance in Teen Titans Go! To the Movies.
- Kilowog makes a cameo appearance in Justice League vs. the Fatal Five, voiced again by Kevin Michael Richardson.
- Kilowog makes a cameo appearance in Justice League Dark: Apokolips War, voiced again by John DiMaggio. He is among the Green Lanterns defending Oa before he is killed by Darkseid.

=== Video games ===
- Kilowog appears in Batman: The Brave and the Bold – The Videogame, voiced again by Diedrich Bader.
- Kilowog appears as an unlockable character in DC Universe Online, voiced by Charlie Campbell.
- Kilowog appears in Green Lantern: Rise of the Manhunters, voiced again by Kevin Michael Richardson.
- Kilowog makes a cameo appearance in Injustice: Gods Among Us.
- Kilowog appears as a playable character in Lego Batman 3: Beyond Gotham, voiced by Travis Willingham.

=== Miscellaneous ===
- Kilowog appears in Legion of Super Heroes in the 31st Century #6.
- Kilowog appears in Smallville Season 11.
- Kilowog appears in the Injustice: Gods Among Us prequel comic. In response to Superman's growing tyranny and alliance with the Sinestro Corps, Kilowog joins the Green Lantern Corps in traveling to Earth and fighting them, only to suffer heavy casualties. Kilowog and the survivors are subsequently imprisoned by the Trench for two years as prisoners of war until Plastic Man mounts a prison break, though Kilowog is killed by Sinestro while assisting Plastic Man.
