= Legion (DC Comics) =

- Legion as depicted in Green Lantern: Emerald Dawn #2 (January 1990). Art by Keith Giffen and Romeo Tanghal.

Publication information
- Publisher: DC Comics
- First appearance: Green Lantern: Emerald Dawn #2 (January 1990)
- Created by: Keith Giffen (plot and pencils); Gerard Jones (script); Romeo Tanghal (inks)

In-story information
- Species: Tchk-Tchkii
- Abilities: Super-strength, invulnerability

Legion is a supervillain in the DC Comics universe. He was created by Keith Giffen, Gerard Jones, and Romeo Tanghal. He is a foe of Abin Sur, the Green Lantern of Sector 2814, the Silver Age Green Lantern and the Green Lantern Corps. His only appearance is in the 1990 mini-series Green Lantern: Emerald Dawn.

== Fictional character biography ==
The Tchk-Tchkii are an insectoid species originating from the planet Tchk-Tchk in Space Sector 407. After conquering their own planet, they intended to conquer their entire galaxy. The Guardians of the Universe took action, sealing off Tchk-Tchk to prevent the Tchk-Tchkii from leaving. Unable to leave, the Tchk-Tchk began to starve and transferred their minds into a robotic body referred to as a "Soul Jar" to survive.

Legion escapes Tchk-Tchk and attempts to kill Abin Sur, but is unsuccessful. Some time later, after learning that Sur has died, Legion targets his successor, Hal Jordan. Legion attacks Oa, the planet base of the Green Lantern Corps, but is attacked by Jordan and has its armor shattered. Legion's consciousness survives and absorbs the power of Oa to empower itself. Jordan empowers himself using the Central Power Battery, allowing him to defeat Legion. Legion is returned to Tchk-Tchk.

== In other media ==
Legion was planned to be the main villain in an unproduced screenplay for a Green Lantern film written by Robert Smigel.
