= Absolute Green Lantern =

Comic book series by DC Comics

- Textless cover of Absolute Green Lantern #1, art by Jahnoy Lindsay

Publication information
- Publisher: DC Comics (Absolute Universe)
- Schedule: Monthly
- Format: Ongoing
- Genre: Horror; Superhero
- Publication date: April 2, 2025 – present
- No. of issues: 19
- Main character(s): Jo Mullein; Hal Jordan; Cameron Chase; John Stewart

Creative team
- Written by: Al Ewing
- Artist: Jahnoy Lindsay

Absolute Green Lantern is a superhero horror comic book series published by DC Comics. It is based on the character Green Lantern, presenting a reinterpretation of the character's mythos. The series is written by Al Ewing and illustrated by Jahnoy Lindsay, and was released on April 2, 2025, as part of DC's Absolute Universe (AU) imprint. It is the sixth title in the imprint, and the last title of the second batch of Absolute titles following Absolute Martian Manhunter.

== Premise ==
The series focuses on Jo Mullein, Hal Jordan, John Stewart, and Guy Gardner after a large Green Lantern falls from the sky and crushes a town, causing widespread paranoia. The series also reinvents the traditional Spectrum that powers the various Lantern Corps, with it being based on steps towards enlightenment rather than emotions.

== Publication history ==
By July 2024, Al Ewing was involved in developing a Green Lantern series under DC Comics Absolute Universe (AU) imprint, titled Absolute Green Lantern, with illustrator Jahnoy Lindsay. The comic was released in April 2025.

Ewing described the series as a horror title, similar to his previous work on The Immortal Hulk, with a major theme being the fear of the unknown, also tying into religious and cosmic horror, and the nature of God.

Sojourner Mullein was chosen as the primary protagonist due to what Ewing felt was his overabundance of writing middle-aged male characters, as well as reading and liking N. K. Jemisin's title Far Sector, where Jo debuted.

== Plot ==
=== Arc 1: Without Fear (Issues #1–6) ===
Sojourner "Jo" Mullein returns to her hometown of Evergreen, Nevada after her divorce from DEO agent Cameron Chase and reunites with her friends Hal Jordan (a toy salesman) and John Stewart (an architect who takes Jo on at his firm). One day, the town becomes encased in an impenetrable green dome generated by a green lantern-shaped vessel hovering high above. The vessel's master, an alien identifying himself as Abin Sur, descends to the town and orders the townspeople to "be without fear". Abin Sur proceeds to pass "judgment" on the town, seemingly obliterating the citizens one by one, starting with Sheriff Guy Gardner. In the chaos, Hal takes a gun belonging to Guy's deputy Rita, whom Abin Sur beheads.

As the days go by, John investigates the dome, noting that a faux gold earring belonging by a biker who crashed into the dome somehow passed right through. John eventually concludes that the green energy is vulnerable to gold, or anything taking the form of gold, comparing the alien power to the Philosopher's Stone. Abin Sur sees John's efforts and passes judgment on him. Spurred by John's apparent death, Hal paints the bullets of Rita's gun yellow. With only three of them remaining, Jo confronts Abin Sur while Hal and Todd Rice, the local coffee shop owner, lie in wait to shoot him. During their conversation, Abin Sur reveals that he killed only Rita; those who were "judged" were sent into the Green Lantern to await further judgment in OA (Omega-Alpha), and he tells her to fear the Weaponers of Qard. As Abin Sur leaves, Jo reaches out to him with her left hand, bearing her gold wedding ring, inadvertently disrupting his power and transferring it to her ring. Without Abin Sur to power it, the dome disspates and the Green Lantern falls, crushing Evergreen.

Enraged and grieved and unable to find Jo, Hal shoots Abin Sur with the gold-painted bullets repeatedly. As he dies, Abin Sur passes judgment on Hal by fusing the gun to his hand, cursing Hal with the power of the Black Hand, which drains life and energy. As he melts away, Abin Sur tells Hal to be with fear, to fear the Black Hand and the Black Star. Hal is left with the Black Hand and is constantly seeing a vision of a ring of light with a strange voice telling him to be without fear. Terrified, he leaves Evergreen and happens upon a diner; the Black Hand takes control and consumes the diner patrons and a cop Hal met on the way. Jo arrives, imbued with the power of Abin Sur's Green Flame, also guided by visions of a ring of light. Jo tries and fails to help Hal control his new power; the Black Hand overtakes him and seeks to consume Jo. Meanwhile, Evergreen and the Green Lantern are seized by Hector Hammond, an egomaniacal billionaire with Carol Ferris as his assistant. Hammond captures Todd, Evergreen's only survivor, for interrogation. Jo manages to overcome the Black Hand, pulling both her and Hal into the Green Lantern.

Inside the Lantern, they are met with John Stewart, who has been made aware of their situation. Abin Sur was an Oan, a follower of the four flames in the Enlightenment Spectrum: Qard (black, chaotic action), Rao (red, restraint), Sur (green, correct action), and Aur (gold, understanding/enlightenment). John was given the power of Aur for deducing how the system works, while Guy was given the power of Rao for the mercy he showed Abin Sur; the 2,000 remaining people of Evergreen have yet to be judged. John explains that the Blackstars, a vast cosmic army, see Qard as the highest level and seek to spread their might throughout the universe. Mogo, a sentient Blackstar planet, is coming to Earth. As a "Tomar" (anomaly), Jo purges Hal of the Black Hand and flees Evergreen with him, releasing black sludge that Hammond's team confiscates. Jo takes Hal to the Coast City apartment of Cameron Chase. John relocates the Green Lantern to the Moon.

=== Arc 2: Sojourner (#7–12) ===
After the Blackstars, driven by the sadistic Kilowog, slaughter Oans and destroy a planet, they are intercepted by Re of Xudar, a Tomar who stole the power of Rao. Re effortlessly kills Kilowog and sends his remains to Sin Es Tro, Controller of MU (Maker-Unmaker) and leader of the Blackstars.

Flasbacks trace Jo's life from childhood, when she moved to Evergreen as a child with her conservative father Thomas. As an adult, she became a police officer, but quit and left town after discovering Sheriff Bill Hand was a racist who ran a protection racket. After coming out as bisexual in Coast City, Jo met and fell for Cameron Chase, but Cameron's workaholism prevented them from having a steady relationship. The two hastily got married, but nothing changed, so Jo had an affair with former colleague Renee Montoya. After admitting the affair, the two divorced, and Jo moved back to Evergreen after Thomas' death.

In the present, Jo keeps an unconscious Hal in Cameron's apartment; Cameron contacts Simon Baz, who is put on the Evergreen case with Kari Limbo, a low-level psychic. Hammond interrogates Todd, learning of Jo and her weakness to gold, so he sends his best assassin, Keith Kenyon, after her. After murdering scientist Steven Dayton for Hammond, Kenyon arms himself with a golden suit and gun (dubbing himself "Goldface") before finding Jo and shooting her. Unable to use her powers, Jo performs self-surgery to remove the bullets and kill Goldface before her powers return and heal her. She convenes with Cameron, Simon, and Kari, who uses her powers to trace Kenyon's connection to Hammond. The group go on the run. After Hal wakes up, Kari performs a reading on Jo's ring, learning that Sin Es Tro is being influenced by a "soulless" mechanical being called the "Manhunter-Mind", representing the Cyan Flame of Vohc (anti-love).

Hammond exposes Todd to the remains of Abin Sur and the Black Hand, mutating Todd into a powerful, mindless beast made of black rock which Hammond dubs "Obsidian". He puppets Obsidian using Dayton's psychic helmet and sends it after Jo, killing Kari. Jo fights Obsidian before Hal unlocks the Magenta Flame of Nos (love), freeing Todd. Re arrives on Earth, having commandeered the Green Lantern from John, and takes Jo and Hal into it to subdue Mogo.

=== Arc 3: Anomalies (#13–17) ===
The Face of Steel detects Hal's Magenta Flame and commands Sin Es Tro to deal with it. As the Green Lantern passes the Blackstar-occupied world of Rann, Sin Es Tro orders planetary overseer Rac Shade, to send out Rann's two Black Hands to vanquish it. A rogue experiment on Rann summons Emily Hawke, an OSS agent from 1941 who was pulled into the Zero-Zone (the extradimensional realm of the Manhunter-Mind, used as a prison by the Blackstars). Emily kills Shade before being returned to the Zone.

Inside the Green Lantern, Re relates his past as a child given Rao's power by his Oan mother before Mogo destroyed his home planet and people. Re then ventured across the cosmos, growing in power as he slaughtered every Blackstar he came across. He plans to use the Green Lantern as a gun to kill Mogo, with the citizens of Evergreen as ammunition, forcing Jo to steer it. Jo battles Re as the Green Lantern passes by Rann and is intercepted by its Black Hands, Katma Tui and Salaak.

Jo manages to outmaneuver Re through her lack of self-imposed limiting on her abilities, trapping him in a cage inside the Lantern while Jordan, Stewart, and Gardner fight on the outside, cornered by the arrival of Sin Es Tro and Mogo. Hal creates a barrier to block Mogo's attack and is met with a vision of Kari Limbo warning him about Bad Idea #0. In an effort to raise their roster against the Blackstars, Jo taps into Abin Sur's ability to grant power, sharing her Green Flame with Jessica Cruz, an agoraphobic. Sin Es Tro kills Salaak and overpowers the others, but John realizes Aur's power allows him to hurt others by making them believe so. Jo and Re arrive, and they manage to kill Sin Es Tro with John's help. Jessica liberates Mogo as Katma Tui gets the Blackstars to surrender.

Back on Earth, Simon is killed by Agent Double, before Double himself is executed by Chase, taking his ID card and making her way into the organization's facilities. Simon's curse sends him into the Zero-Zone; he meets Emily as the Manhunter-Mind resolves to resurrect Sin Es Tro and eliminate Jo.

=== Arc 4: TBA (#18–24) ===
In the Zero-Zone, Emily and Simon are attacked by the Face of Steel's Manhunters, but escape when Simon uses his reflection in Emily's eyes to return to normal reality. At the DEO, Cameron reveals to them File #0, which details the organization's origins and ties to the Manhunters. In the 1940s, the DEO was founded by Paul Kirk, alongside its Task Force X, with the noble goal of protecting American interests after Kirk had an encounter with aliens representing the Gold Flame of Zur (knowledge). However, after getting rebranded as the Agency, the organization grew more and more corrupt until they were subject to influence from the Manhunters; the Agency now controls America's governments at the Manhunter's behest (led by a monstrous Uncle Sam). The DEO is meant to cull any and all resistance to the Manhunters' arrival and 'harvest' of Earth's sentient life. Task Force X still operates as a much smaller, shadowy group led by Amanda Waller, and its ranks include Mark Shaw (a mole inside Hammond's company), Renee Montoya, Chase Lawler, Will Everett III, and Kyle Rayner (whom Waller sends after Cameron for discovering the file).

Following Hammond's death, Carol Ferris becomes CEO of the company with Shaw as her right hand. Meanwhile, Jo and her friends return to Evergreen, rebuilding and declaring it "Green Lantern country."

== Collected editions ==
#	Title	Material collected	Format	Pages	Released	ISBN
1	Without Fear	Absolute Green Lantern #1–6	HC	176	December 9, 2025	978-1799505549
1	Without Fear	Absolute Green Lantern #1–6	TPB	176	December 9, 2025	978-1799505556
2	Sojourner	Absolute Green Lantern #7–12	HC	176	June 9, 2026	978-1799508403
2	Sojourner	Absolute Green Lantern #7–12	TPB	176	June 9, 2026	978-1799508410
3	Anomalies	Absolute Green Lantern #13–17	HC	176	December 1, 2026	978-1799509950
3	Anomalies	Absolute Green Lantern #13–17	TPB	176	December 1, 2026	978-1799509967
