= Green Lantern: Secret Origin =

Comic book story arc

"Secret Origin"
- Cover of Green Lantern vol. 4, 29 (Jun 2008), art by Ivan Reis
- Publisher: DC Comics
- Publication date: June – December 2008
- Genre: Superhero
- Title(s): Green Lantern (vol. 4) #29-35
- Main character(s): Hal Jordan; Carol Ferris; Sinestro; Abin Sur; Green Lantern Corps; Atrocitus; William Hand

Creative team
- Writer: Geoff Johns
- Artist: Ivan Reis
- Hardcover: ISBN 1-4012-1990-X

"Secret Origin" is a comic book story arc published in Green Lantern (vol. 4) #29-35 by DC Comics. Written by Geoff Johns and penciled by Ivan Reis, the story retells the origin of Earth's first Green Lantern Corps member Hal Jordan for the New Earth continuity. It featured Abin Sur, Sinestro as a Green Lantern, the new character Atrocitus of the Five Inversions, and served as one of many preludes to the Blackest Night story line.

== Plot ==
After his father dies in a plane accident, Hal Jordan is forbidden by his mother from ever going anywhere near an airplane. Throughout his youth, Hal disobeys her, sneaking into airfields and hangars to get the best possible view of the jets flying overhead. One day, she catches him doing it and they lament the fact that they never understood each other. The minute after turning eighteen, Hal joins the Air Force.

Hal tends to take risks while flying planes, even crashing one during a stress test. After a barfight, Hal finds his brother waiting for him, where he's told that his mother is dying. Not wanting to see her son unless he quit the Air Force, Jordan would later start a fight with a superior officer and be thrown out. When he went to see his mother, he was already too late, she had died, and Hal's other brother Jack declares it was Hal's going against her wishes that caused her to die so suddenly having heard of his recklessness.

Meanwhile, on the planet Ysmault, Sector 2814 Green Lantern Abin Sur questions the Five Inversions about everything they know about cosmic revelations, and a forthcoming "Blackest Night".

In a spacecraft, Abin Sur has Inversion Atrocitus locked in a tank and makes his way to Earth. He tells fellow Green Lantern Sinestro that Earth is foretold to be the, "birthplace of the Black, the antithesis of the emotional spectrum". Sinestro warns him to overcome the fear that the Inversions have instilled him with, but reassures him that if he needs backup, he would not be deterred by the Guardians' strict territorial edict. Back on Earth, Jordan pleads with his superior to allow him to fly again. The man says it is not up to him, as he's selling to Ferris Air. Hal is then reintroduced to Carol Ferris, now a gorgeous young woman, whom he had not seen since they were both children. Frustrated, Jordan takes a seat in a mangled plane.

In the spacecraft, Atrocitus breaks free of his constructs, mortally wounds Abin Sur and bails out, leaving Sur in the craft as it crashes in the desert. Sur instructs his ring to file information for Sinestro, as his ring leaves his finger and searches for a replacement sentient. The ring finds Hal Jordan in the mangled plane and carries him off. During the journey, Sur informs him of the duties of a Green Lantern and that he has been accepted because he can "overcome great fear". When he lands, he meets Sur and accepts to be the first Green Lantern from Earth. Sur utters one last word, "Sinestro" and dies.

The ring places him in a badgeless Green Lantern uniform. Jordan flies through the air and saves a plane from crashing. When he helps it to land, the ring conceals his identity with a face mask. Carol Ferris meets him and they share a moment, until a man named Hector Hammond interrupts them.

Hammond observes that this Green Lantern appears clueless about what's going on, and offers his assistance. Jordan defiantly flies off back to Abin Sur's crash site and buries Sur under a cairn of rocks. His ring informs him that he is to report to Oa immediately for training. Jordan arrives on the planet and begins rigorous training under drill sergeant Kilowog. Jordan learns about the Corps rings ineffectiveness against yellow and eventually graduates to being an officer. Later, in Sector 1417, a Guardian that has taken the name Ganthet asks Sinestro to travel to Earth, investigate Abin Sur's death, and guide his replacement. Sinestro is at first resistant to breaking the territorial edict, but was convinced by Ganthet and began making his way toward Earth.

Hammond examines Abin Sur's Ship and after attempting to reactivate it, is bombarded by the ship's exhaust, which causes Hammond's brain to increase in size and hear the thoughts of his underlings. After hearing them constantly insult him, he kills them all and heads to Ferris Air.

Jordan arrives on Earth to the amazement of his friend Thomas Kalmaku who identifies him as a Green Lantern. Jordan hears about a walkout of Ferris Air, and reluctantly agrees to fly for Carol. During the flight, Sinestro arrives in the path of Jordan, which destroys the plane. Jordan then asks his ring whether the ring can rebuild the now destroyed plane. This is when Sinestro drops some Green Lantern knowledge on Jordan: "The questions shouldn't be posed to your ring, it should be posed to you". Hal miserably attempts to fight Sinestro, with Sinestro waving away his constructs, saying they are "laced with anger. And although the Guardians believe fear creates cracks in our willpower - anger will distort [our willpower]. Anger will make it unfocused. [And a] Green Lantern needs to be focused". After Sinestro repairs the jet, Hal returns to Ferris, where Carol begins to berate him for disappearing on the radar, when Hammond arrives and attacks the two telepathically.

Hammond discovers that Jordan is the Green Lantern and begins to torture him telepathically, when Sinestro knocks him out. The two disappear, to the confusion of Carol, and discuss Jordan's training. Sinestro accesses the message that Sur left him, learns of the Manhunters, Sector 666, the Five Inversions, and Sur's demise, and realizes that Atrocitus is on Earth.

William Hand is at the family morgue, about to commit necrophilia, when Atrocitus interrupts, saying that Hand is the key to the Blackest Night. Jordan and Sinestro arrive, and Atrocitus uses a device to drain them of their Power Ring's energy leaving the two powerless. Despite this, they battle Atrocitus and manage to recharge thanks to Sinestro's knowledge on the "confined pocket dimensions and the storage of personal charging units". Just when Atrocitus is about to crush Sinestro with an excavator, Jordan uses his ring to destroy it. Sinestro is amazed, as Jordan was able to overcome the Yellow Impurity, but pretends not to notice it. Sinestro arrests Atrocitus, not realizing that Hand has stolen the device, and tells Jordan to get over his anger. Jordan flies off to find Carl Ferris, Carol's father, whom he blames for his own father's death. He arrives at the Ferris residence only to find that Carl is not on vacation as Carol had previously claimed, but in fact has fallen ill due to the guilt from his involvement in Martin Jordan's death. After a chat with Carol, Hal's ring emits a construct that resembles his father. Sinestro states Jordan has finally tapped into the true power of the ring. The two shake hands, when they are summoned to Oa by the Guardians.

The Guardians accuse the two Green Lanterns of disorderly conduct, as Sinestro has broken the territorial edict, despite Sinestro's claim that a Guardian named "Ganthet" gave him orders to intercept Atrocitus. Jordan accuses the Guardians of being afraid of the Green Lanterns, as most of the planet is covered in Yellow. The Guardians re-inform Sinestro that Hal Jordan is now the responsibility of Sinestro "as much ...as Korugar and the rest of sector 1417". The Guardians acquit the two, and order Sinestro to monitor Jordan's progress. Jordan wanders off and tries to blast a yellow statue but fails. Sinestro departs to return Atrocitus to the prison planet Ysmault after telling Jordan that the next time the two meet it will be on Sinestro's homeworld.

Jordan returns to Ferris Air and agrees to stay as Carol's pilot. Thomas reveals his plane, which is Hal's father's old plane, revealing that Carol had him fix it up. Hal asks Carol out to dinner, but she refuses, claiming, she does not date employees. In Hammond's cell, his head begins to swell, as he rambles about the Green Lantern, and how he will be part of his life again. William Hand attempts to touch a dead body at the Coast City Hospital, when a security guard catches him in the act. Hand blasts him using Atrocitus' device, saying "It's okay. Dead is good". On Ysmault, Atrocitus claims that he and his fellow felons "see... the fate of ... Korugar" and that Sinestro's homeworld "will soon descend into civil unrest, violent riots, a bloody coup", and that "chaos will spin it out of [Sinestro's] control". Sinestro replies that "Korugar will never embrace chaos, as long as Sinestro's around to instill order". Atrocitus then predicts that Sinestro will feel his rage, and that he will burn by it, as his eyes begin to resemble the insignia of the Red Lanterns. Hal visits his father's grave when Jim arrives. Hal apologizes to him and reveals that he is the Green Lantern, and gives him the Flight Journal, saying "It's a long story, so I wrote it down for you".
