= Green Lantern (film) =

2011 superhero film

- Theatrical release poster
- Directed by: Martin Campbell
- Screenplay by: Greg Berlanti; Michael Green; Marc Guggenheim; Michael Goldenberg
- Story by: Greg Berlanti; Michael Green; Marc Guggenheim
- Based on: Characters appearing in comic books published by DC Comics
- Produced by: Donald De Line; Greg Berlanti; Geoff Johns
- Starring: Ryan Reynolds; Blake Lively; Peter Sarsgaard; Mark Strong; Angela Bassett; Tim Robbins
- Cinematography: Dion Beebe
- Edited by: Stuart Baird
- Music by: James Newton Howard
- Production companies: Warner Bros. Pictures; DC Entertainment; De Line Pictures
- Distributed by: Warner Bros. Pictures
- Release dates: June 15, 2011 (Grauman's Chinese Theatre); June 17, 2011 (United States)
- Running time: 123 minutes
- Country: United States
- Language: English
- Budget: $200 million
- Box office: $237 million

Green Lantern is a 2011 American superhero film based on the DC Comics character Hal Jordan / Green Lantern. It was directed by Martin Campbell, from a screenplay by Greg Berlanti, Michael Green, Marc Guggenheim, and Michael Goldenberg. (Note: Greg Berlanti, Michael Green and Marc Guggenheim wrote the initial screenplay, which was subsequently rewritten by Michael Goldenberg.) Ryan Reynolds stars as the titular character, a test pilot who is selected to become the first human member of the Green Lantern Corps, an intergalactic police force. He is given a ring that grants him superpowers and must confront Parallax, a being who threatens to upset the balance of power in the universe. The film also stars Blake Lively, Peter Sarsgaard, Mark Strong, Angela Bassett, and Tim Robbins.

The film first entered development in 1997; progress remained stalled until Berlanti was hired to write and direct in October 2007. Martin Campbell was brought on board in February 2009 after Berlanti was forced to vacate the director's position. Most of the live-action actors were cast between July 2009 and February 2010, and filming took place from March to August 2010 in Louisiana. The film was converted to 3D during its post-production stage. This was the first DC film since Catwoman (2004) not to be involved with Legendary Pictures.

Green Lantern was released in the United States on June 17, 2011, by Warner Bros. Pictures. The film received negative reviews from critics, although Reynolds' performance was praised. Additionally, it grossed only $237 million against a $200 million budget. It was intended to launch a media franchise and shared universe based on DC characters, but Warner Bros. abandoned these plans due to the film's critical and commercial disappointment, opting to have Man of Steel (2013) launch the DC Extended Universe two years later.

== Plot ==
Billions of years ago, the Guardians of the Universe used the green essence of willpower to create an intergalactic police force called the Green Lantern Corps. They divided the universe into 3,600 sectors, with one assigned Green Lantern per sector.

Abin Sur of Sector 2814 defeats the malevolent being Parallax, and imprisons him in the Lost Sector on the desolate planet Ryut. Years later, Parallax escapes from prison after becoming strengthened by an encounter with crash survivors who had accidentally fallen into the dugout where he was imprisoned. Parallax pursues and mortally wounds Abin Sur. Abin Sur escapes, and crash-lands on Earth, commanding his power ring to find a worthy successor.

Hal Jordan, a cocky test pilot working at Ferris Aircraft, is chosen by the ring, and transported to the crash site. Abin Sur provides Hal with his ring, telling him to place it in the lantern and speak the oath, before succumbing from his wounds. Hal takes the lantern, recites the oath, and declares himself as a Green Lantern. The ring teleports Hal across outer space to the planet Oa (homeworld of the Green Lanterns), where he meets veteran Corps members: Tomar-Re, Kilowog, and leader Sinestro. During his extreme training sessions, Sinestro believes Hal is unable to harness the power of the ring due to his lack of will. Disheartened by Sinestro's doubts, Hal quits and returns to Earth, keeping the power ring.

Scientist Hector Hammond is summoned by his father, Senator Robert Hammond, to a secret government facility to perform an autopsy on Abin Sur's body under supervision of Amanda Waller. A piece of Parallax's DNA inside the corpse enters Hammond, giving him psychic powers at the cost of his health and sanity. Hector develops a personal resentment towards his father, and plans to kill him by telekinetically sabotaging his helicopter at a massive party. Hal saves the senator and party guests, including his childhood sweetheart Carol Ferris. Hector rampages the government facility, and uses his telekinesis to incinerate his surviving father. Hal telepathically connects with Hector, and realizes Parallax is approaching Earth to devour fear from its inhabitants.

Back in Oa, the Guardians narrate to Sinestro that one of their fellow guardians became Parallax after a backfired attempt to control the forbidden yellow essence of fear. Arguing that the only way to fight fear is with fear itself, Sinestro proposes to forge a ring of the same yellow energy, preparing to concede Earth's destruction to Parallax in order to protect Oa. Hal reasons to the Guardians and Sinestro that fear will turn the users evil if its power is used, but they reject his pleas. He returns to Earth to try to defeat Parallax on his own.

Hal saves Carol from Hammond after a brief showdown. Parallax arrives, consumes Hammond's entire life force, and wreaks havoc on Coast City. After a fierce ground battle, Hal lures Parallax away from Earth to chase him across the Solar System. Hal successfully traps Parallax in the gravitational pull of the Sun where it is destroyed. Hal loses consciousness, but is saved by Sinestro, Kilowog, and Tomar-Re. After returning to Oa, the entire Green Lantern Corps congratulate Hal for his courage and bravery in defeating Parallax. Sinestro tells him that he now bears the responsibility of protecting his sector as a Green Lantern. Hal and Carol spend one last time together, before Hal leaves Earth.

In a mid-credits scene, Sinestro secretly takes the yellow ring, causing his green suit and eyes to turn yellow, foreshadowing a rebellion against the Corps.

== Cast ==
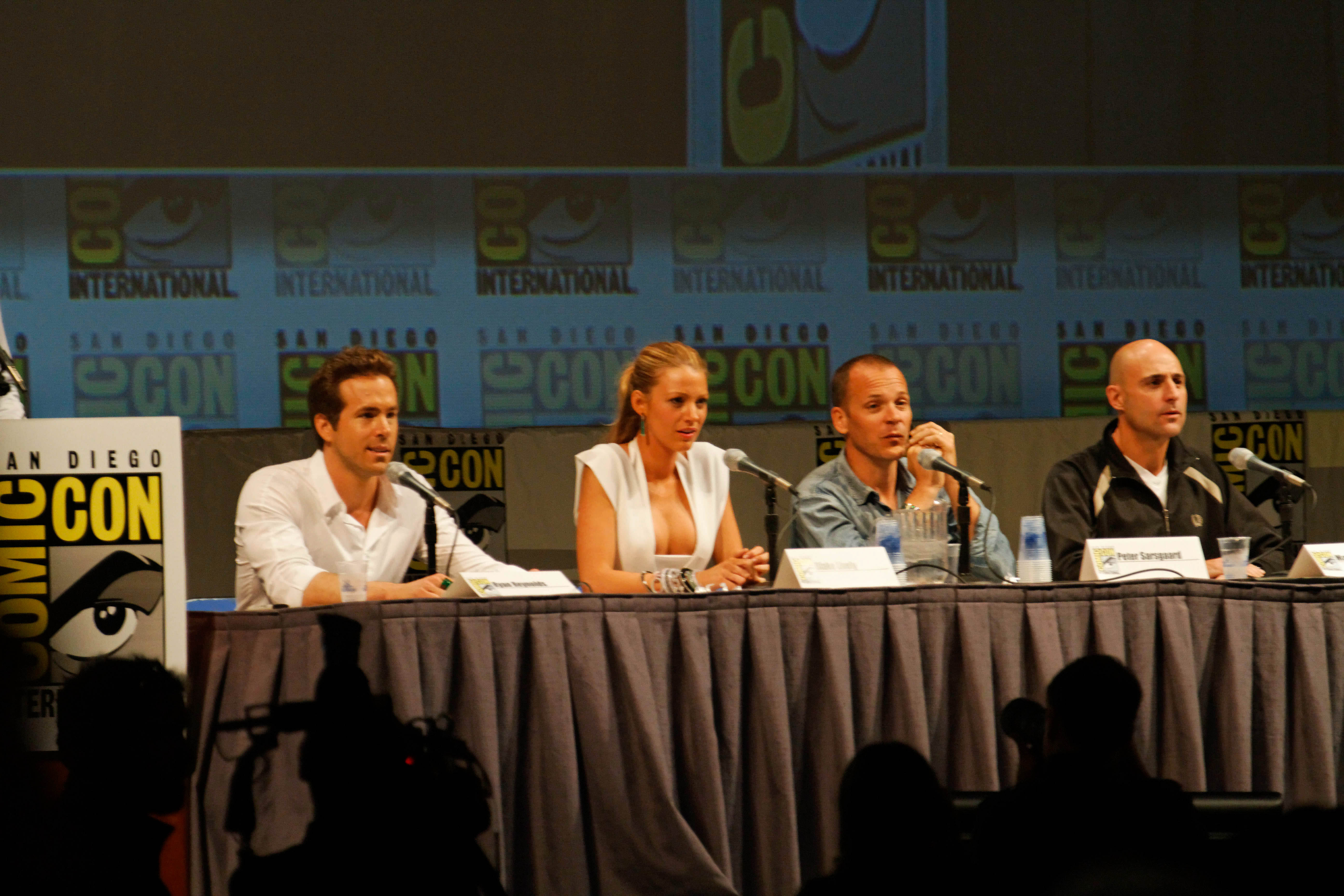
Cast of Green Lantern at the 2010 San Diego Comic-Con

- Ryan Reynolds as Hal Jordan / Green Lantern:
  A test pilot for the Ferris Aircraft Company whose will to act qualifies him to become the first human ever inducted into an intergalactic peacekeeping force fueled by the green energy of will. Reynolds said, "I've known about 'Green Lantern' my whole life, but I've never really followed it before. I fell in love with the character when I met with Martin Campbell". Reynolds called the film "an origin story to a certain degree, but it's not a labored origin story, where the movie begins in the third act. The movie starts when it starts. We find out Hal is the guy fairly early on, and the adventure begins". Alternatively Michael Fassbender, Henry Cavill, Chris Pine, Sam Worthington, Jon Hamm, Sebastian Stan, Nathan Fillion, Bradley Cooper, Justin Timberlake and Jared Leto were considered for the role, while Brian Austin Green, a Green Lantern fan, campaigned for the part, but ultimately did not audition. Cooper unsuccessfully auditioned for the role as he kept imitating Christian Bale's Batman voice despite Campbell telling him to tone it down. Fillion would later voice Hal Jordan in several DC animated projects and play Guy Gardner in the DC Universe.
  - Gattlin Griffith portrays a young Jordan.
- Blake Lively as Carol Ferris:
  The vice president of Ferris Aircraft and a long-time love interest of Hal Jordan. One pseudonymous writer citing unnamed sources said Lively was among five leading contenders that included Eva Green, Keri Russell, Diane Kruger, and Jennifer Garner. About her stunt work in which she rehearsed with stunt coordinator Gary Powell (Casino Royale, The Bourne Ultimatum, Quantum of Solace), gymnastic acrobats from Cirque du Soleil and used aerial stunt rigs created for The Matrix, Lively explained: "Our director likes it real—the fights close and dirty... I'm 40 feet in the air, spiraling around. That's the best workout you can ever do because it's all core... You do that for ten minutes and you should see your body the next day! It's so exhilarating, so thrilling—and nauseating".
  - Jenna Craig portrays a young Ferris.
- Peter Sarsgaard as Hector Hammond:
  A scientist who is exposed to the yellow energy of fear from Parallax, which causes his brain to grow to an enormous size and grants him psionic powers. Regarding his preparation for the role, Sarsgaard stated: "I actually did hang with this biologist from Tulane that was I think just the most eccentric guy they could find. He was entertaining, and he and I actually worked on my lecture that I give in Green Lantern". About his character Sarsgaard remarked that "he's got shades of gray. It's eccentricity on top of eccentricity".
  - Kennon Kepper portrays a young Hammond.
- Mark Strong as Thaal Sinestro:
  A Green Lantern and Hal Jordan's mentor. Strong affirmed that the film follows the origin story and that "the film closely follows the early comics. Sinestro starts out as Hal Jordan's mentor, slightly suspicious and not sure of him because obviously Hal is the first human being who's made into a Green Lantern. He's certainly very strict and unsure of the wisdom of Hal becoming a Green Lantern". Strong said that the character "is a military guy but isn't immediately bad. It's the kind of person that lends himself to becoming bad over the course of the comics being written, but initially, he's quite a heroic figure". He also revealed that the outfit and other aspects of the character very closely follow the character's early days: "That widow's peak and thin mustache was for some reason originally based on David Niven... So I would like to do justice to the Sinestro that was conceived for the comic books".
- Angela Bassett as Amanda Waller:
  A former congressional aide and government agent. About the differences between the comic book and film character Bassett said, "Well, I'm not 300 pounds", but added that her character does have "that intellectual, that bright, that no-nonsense, that means business personality. She is getting it done and in the trenches nothing fazes her".
- Tim Robbins as Robert Hammond:
  A United States senator and the father of Hector Hammond.
- Temuera Morrison as Abin Sur:
  A Green Lantern who crash lands on Earth and recruits Hal Jordan as his replacement. Morrison said it took four to five hours to put on the prosthetic makeup for the character. About filming with Ryan Reynolds, Morrison commented, "We did the whole scene together where I give him the ring, our suits are CGI so we had these grey suits with things on them so it was cool, and working with Martin Campbell again was great too".
- Geoffrey Rush as Tomar-Re:
  A bird-like member of the Green Lantern Corps who teaches Hal Jordan how to use his cosmic powers. Rush said that he was not initially familiar with Green Lantern but was drawn to the part after seeing the concept art: "When I got the offer for it I said, 'Haven't they made that film?' They said, 'No, it's a completely computer-generated character'. I saw the artwork and I said, I would love to be that guy. Because I had voiced an owl in Legend of the Guardians: The Owls of Ga'Hoole and I'd voiced a pelican in Finding Nemo and I thought I could really improve on that now by being half-bird, half-fish, part lizard. You don't get to do that in a live-action film". Rush compared the role to previous roles where he played a mentoring figure: "You could say that I've mentored Queen Elizabeth I as Sir [Francis] Walsingham, and [Leon] Trotsky has mentored Frida Kahlo and now Tomar Re is going to mentor Hal Jordan, and I was sort of mentoring King George VI in The King's Speech. But I can't imagine Tomar Re setting up an office on Harley Street in London. They're all very different people to me, but there is a kind of theme I suppose".
- Michael Clarke Duncan as Kilowog:
  A drill sergeant trainer of new recruits for the Green Lantern Corps. About the character, Duncan, a fan of the comic book, said that "he is a real type of tough guy who knows everything, and actually in one of the comic books he and Superman fought to a tie".
- Taika Waititi as Thomas Kalmaku:
  An Inuk engineer at Ferris Aircraft. Waititi said he was cast after a Warner Bros. casting agent saw his performance in Boy, which he also wrote and directed. Waititi—who has a Jewish mother and Māori father—said the production "had an opening for a role in the film for someone who wasn't, I don't know, not white or not black".
- Clancy Brown as Parallax:
  An entity made up of the yellow energy of fear, Parallax was imprisoned by Abin Sur after breaking into the physical plane by possessing the body of a former Guardian of the Universe.

Additionally, Jon Tenney plays Martin Jordan, Hal Jordan's father; Jay O. Sanders portrays Carl Ferris, an aircraft designer and father of Carol Ferris; Mike Doyle was cast as Jack Jordan, Hal Jordan's older brother; and Nick Jandl was cast as Jim Jordan, Hal Jordan's younger brother.

== Production ==
=== Development ===
In early 1997, Warner Bros. Pictures approached cult filmmaker and comic book writer Kevin Smith, who had then just finished writing Superman Lives, to script a Green Lantern film. Smith turned down the offer, believing there were more suitable candidates to make a Green Lantern film. At one point, Quentin Tarantino was offered the chance to write and direct. Warner Bros. also considered the property as an action comedy; by 2004, Robert Smigel had completed a script which was set to star Jack Black in the lead role, but the studio dropped the comedy idea following poor fan reaction from the Internet and chose to focus on a serious Green Lantern film instead. David S. Goyer was offered the chance to write and direct either a Green Lantern or The Flash film after Warner Bros. was impressed with his screenplay for Batman Begins, but he opted to direct the latter.

Actor-writer Corey Reynolds, a comic book fan of the John Stewart character, pitched to Warner Bros. an idea for a trilogy, with him starring and performing screenwriting duties. He finished the script for Green Lantern: Birth of a Hero in June 2007, receiving positive feedback from Warner Bros. Reynolds hoped for a potential 2010 release date. However, for unknown reasons, the studio abandoned Reynolds' concept. In October the same year, Greg Berlanti signed to direct the film and cowrite it with comic book writers Michael Green and Marc Guggenheim. A draft of the trio's 2008 script, leaked on the Internet, revealed a story that included the hero's origin and included the characters Carol Ferris, Kilowog, Sinestro, and Guy Gardner in a cameo appearance, and appeared "to set up Hector Hammond as Hal Jordan's ... first major nemesis...." Earlier drafts of the script also included a Superman cameo appearance, which was later scrapped.

Shortly afterward, Guggenheim said that the script would contain characterizations inspired by Dennis O'Neil and Neal Adams' run on Green Lantern in the 1970s, and Dave Gibbons' work in the early 1980s. He added that he and his co-writers also looked to the 2000s Geoff Johns stories: "It's been interesting because we finished a draft just before Johns' "Secret Origin" story arc started up. So I've been reading "Secret Origin" with a real interest in seeing 'OK, how did Geoff solve this problem?' There are certain elements just for anyone trying to retell Hal's origin for a modern-day audience to address and grapple with. For example, why the hell was Abin Sur flying in a spaceship when he's a Green Lantern? You don't ask that question back in the Silver Age, but when you're writing in the Modern Age, you have to answer these things".

=== Pre-production ===
By December 2008, the writers had written three drafts of the screenplay and Warner Bros. was preparing for pre-production. By February 2009 Berlanti was no longer attached to the project and Martin Campbell entered negotiations to direct. The release date was set as December 2010, before being moved to June 17, 2011. Speaking about the experience in 2016, Berlanti confirmed that he was fired as both director and writer, stating that he had nothing to do with the finished product.

Bradley Cooper, Ryan Reynolds, Justin Timberlake, and Jared Leto were the producers' top choices for the starring role in July 2009. On July 10, Reynolds was cast as Hal Jordan/Green Lantern. Reynolds took the role after 20th Century Fox had no intention to make a Deadpool film. A website reported on January 7, 2010, that a crew-member had written on her blog that the film was greenlit the day before and that filming would begin in 10 weeks. Also in January, Blake Lively was cast as Carol Ferris, Peter Sarsgaard as Hector Hammond, and Mark Strong as Sinestro. In February, Tim Robbins joined the cast as Senator Hammond. The following month, New Zealanders Temuera Morrison and Taika Waititi had joined the cast as Abin Sur and Tom Kalmaku, respectively.

=== Filming ===
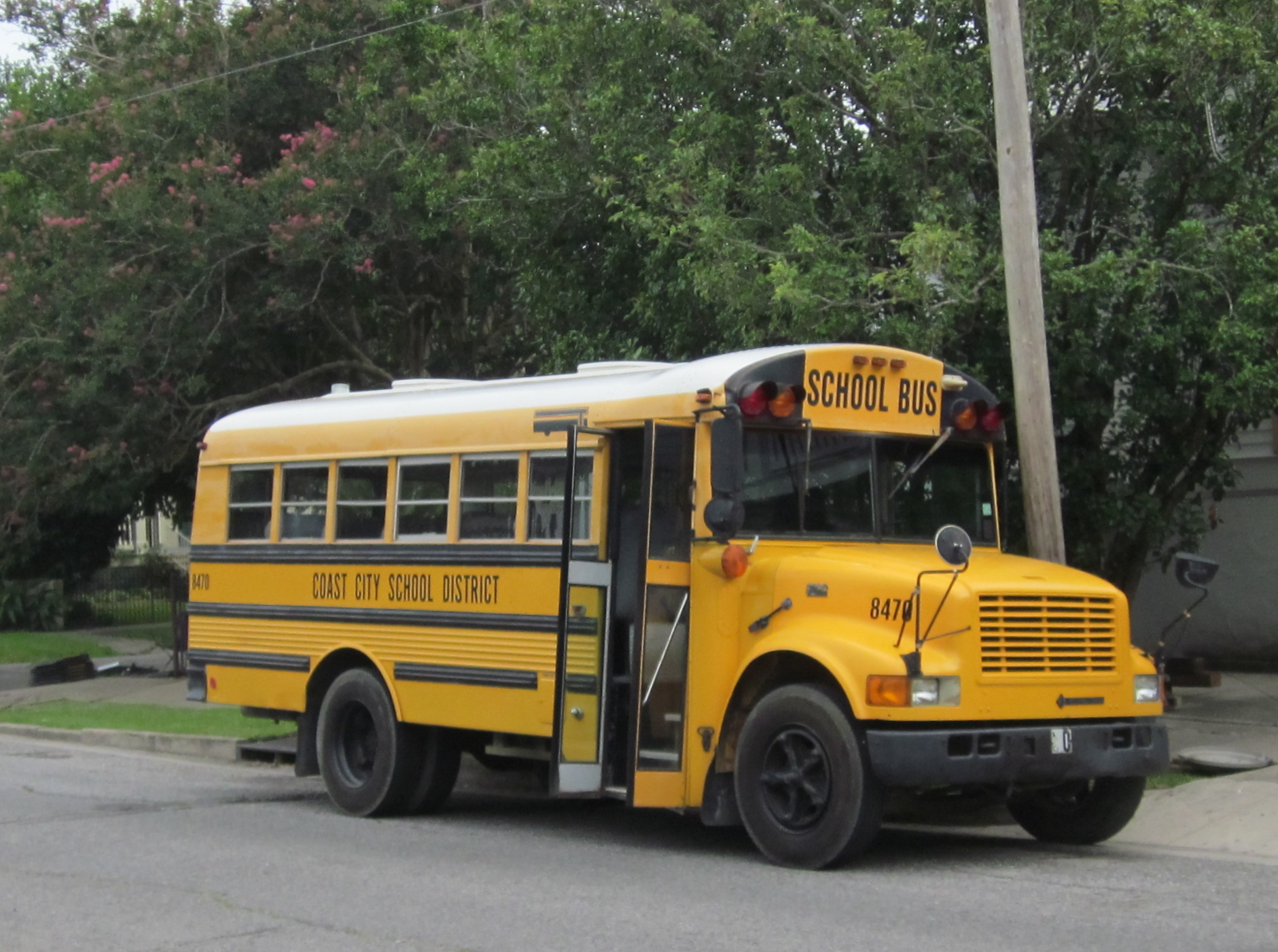
School bus marked with Green Lantern's fictional "Coast City" used in a shot in the Carrollton section of New Orleans, July 2010

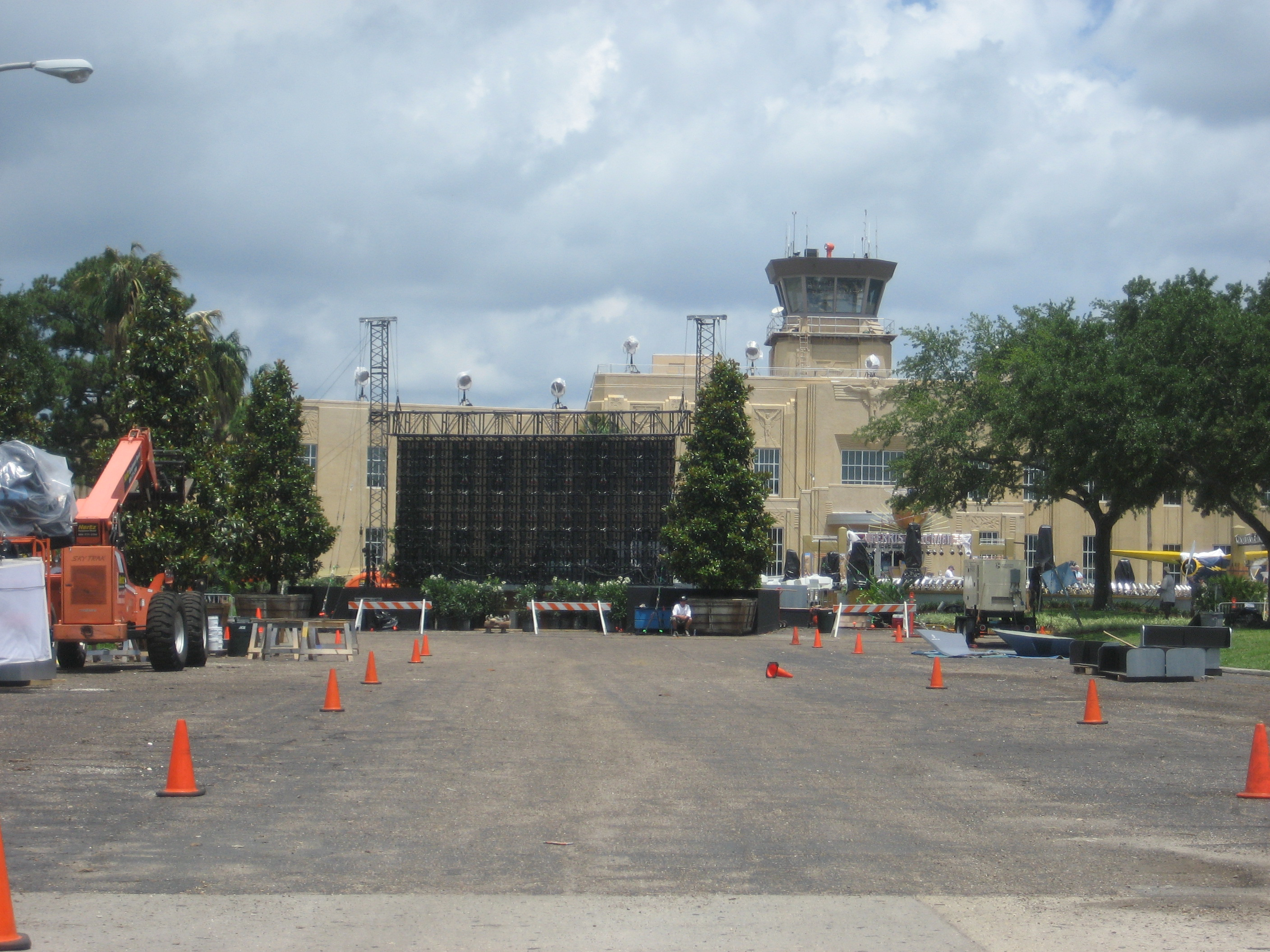
New Orleans Lakefront Airport's Art Deco Terminal Building used as set for Ferris Aircraft headquarters, May 2010

With a production budget of $200 million, Green Lantern was initially scheduled to begin filming in November 2009 at Fox Studios Australia. The start date was pushed back to January 2010, but the production moved to Louisiana, where, on March 3, test footage was filmed in Madisonville involving stunt cars. Principal photography began on March 15 in New Orleans, which doubled for Coast City, California, a fictional city in DC Comics. Nine days after filming began, Angela Bassett joined the cast as Amanda Waller, a government agent who is a staple of the DC Comics universe.

The same year in April, Jon Tenney was cast as Hal Jordan's father, test pilot Martin H. Jordan. Against Campbell's wishes, the film's production head decided to have the sequence of Martin's death in an air crash intercut with Hal plunging in the plane and witnessing the flashbacks coming to him. By June, filming began at New Orleans Lakefront Airport. In the same month, Mike Doyle was cast as Jack Jordan, the older brother of Hal Jordan. In July, Ryan Reynolds was injured while shooting scenes for the film, separating his shoulder and in "lots of pain".

While promoting Deadpool (in which Reynolds portrays another famous comic book superhero) in 2016, Reynolds said that filming Green Lantern itself had been frustrating: "You really need a visionary behind a movie like that, but it was the classic studio story: 'We have a poster, but we don't have a script or know what we want; let's start shooting!'" In an exclusive interview with Screen Rant in 2021, Campbell reflected that he should not have directed the film after all and admitted responsibility for the film "not working out". Comparing to how he saw all James Bond films before directing Casino Royale, Campbell acknowledged that superhero movies were never his "cup of tea". In 2025, Campbell also stated that the film would have been better had Reynolds also written the script.

=== Post-production ===
Principal photography ended on August 6, 2010. In an interview with MTV News, director Martin Campbell was asked about the film's effects-heavy epic scale and commented that it was a daunting process and that the film has 1,300 visual shots. When asked about the constructs created from the power rings, Campbell answered: "One of the nice things is, we'll all sit down and say, 'Well, what are we going to do here?' Really, it's as much as your imagination can go to make the constructs". The studio also confirmed that the film would have a 3D release.

In January 2011, Green Lantern began re-shoots for key scenes at Warner Bros. Studios in Los Angeles, California. In March, Geoffrey Rush joined the cast as the voice of the CGI-created character, Tomar-Re. In April, Michael Clarke Duncan was cast as the voice of Kilowog. Also that month, Warner Bros. raised the visual effects budget by $9 million and hired additional visual effects studios to bolster the ranks of the team that had been working overtime to meet the film's release date. The film's theatrical running time ended up being 114 minutes.

== Music ==
The Green Lantern score was composed by James Newton Howard, who also worked on the other DC Comics-based films Batman Begins and The Dark Knight with Hans Zimmer, performed by the Hollywood Studio Symphony and conducted by Pete Anthony. The soundtrack was published by WaterTower Music, and released in stores on June 14, 2011.

== Release ==
=== Marketing ===
Marketing and promotional materials for the film totaled $100 million. The first footage of the film was shown at the 2010 San Diego Comic-Con and was widely released online in November with thirty seconds of footage airing the following day on Entertainment Tonight. The first full theatrical trailer for the film was shown before screenings of Harry Potter and the Deathly Hallows – Part 1 and became available online in November. This initial trailer was met with a poor reception from fans and, as a result, the film's marketing campaign was delayed. Sue Kroll, the studio's worldwide marketing president responded: "Part of the reason the response to the first trailer was lukewarm was that the big-scale sequences weren't ready to show, and we suffered for it. We can't afford to do that again". In April, Warner Bros. debuted nine minutes of footage at the 2011 WonderCon in San Francisco. The Hollywood Reporter reported that the footage wowed the audience. A four-minute cut of the WonderCon footage was later released online.

==== Animation ====
In March 2010, Comics Continuum reported that an animated Green Lantern film was in the works at Warner Bros. Animation, as a direct-to-video project that was timed for the release of the live-action Green Lantern movie in the summer of 2011. The Green Lantern animated project was described as taking a look at the origins of the Green Lantern Corps, including the first ring wielders. In an interview with Bruce Timm, the producer revealed that a sequel to the Green Lantern animated movie was discussed but canceled because of the picture not achieving the immediate success that they had hoped for, although Timm hoped that the live-action film would renew interest in a sequel. The animated film entitled Green Lantern: Emerald Knights was officially announced in June instead.

==== Comics ====
DC Entertainment began releasing a series of Green Lantern Movie Prequel comics the week before the film was released, covering the lives of the characters before the events of the film, written by members of the film's production team. Five comics were made, covering Tomar-Re by Marc Guggenheim, Kilowog by Peter Tomasi, Abin Sur by Michael Green, Hal Jordan by Greg Berlanti, and Sinestro by Michael Goldenberg and Geoff Johns. A free excerpt of the Sinestro prequel comic was released online as "Secret Origin of the Green Lantern Corps #1" two days before the release of the film.

==== Roller coaster ====
Six Flags debuted two roller coasters named Green Lantern at Great Adventure and Magic Mountain in 2011 to coincide with the film's release.

==== Video game ====
Warner Bros. Interactive produced a tie-in video game, Green Lantern: Rise of the Manhunters, for the PlayStation 3 and Xbox 360 by Double Helix Games, with versions for the Nintendo Wii, Nintendo DS, and Nintendo 3DS by Griptonite Games.

=== Home media ===
Green Lantern was released on DVD and Blu-ray on October 14, 2011. The Blu-ray release includes an extended cut, which adds an extra nine minutes of footage to the running time, totaling 123 minutes.

== Reception ==
=== Box office ===
Green Lantern had its world premiere at Grauman's Chinese Theatre in Hollywood, California on June 15, 2011. Green Lantern opened on Friday, June 17, 2011, in North America, earning $3.4 million in 1,180 midnight runs. The film grossed $21.4 million on its opening day. It earned $53.2 million during its opening weekend, taking the number-one spot.

In its second weekend, Green Lantern dropped into third place behind Cars 2 and Bad Teacher, experiencing a 66 percent decline, which was the largest second-weekend decline for a superhero film at the time. Green Lantern grossed $116.6 million in the United States and Canada, as well as $120.6 million internationally, bringing its worldwide total to $237.2 million. Many industry analysts felt that Green Lantern "failed to perform to expectations". The Hollywood Reporter speculated that Green Lantern needed to make approximately $500 million to be considered financially solid. Some publications listed the losses for the studio as high as $75 million.

=== Critical response ===
On the review aggregator website Rotten Tomatoes, the film holds an approval rating of 25% based on 248 reviews. The site's critical consensus reads: "Noisy, overproduced, and thinly written, Green Lantern squanders an impressive budget and decades of comics mythology". Metacritic, which uses a weighted average, assigned the film a score of 39 out of 100 from 39 critics, indicating "generally unfavorable" reviews. Audiences polled by CinemaScore gave the film an average grade of "B" on an A+ to F scale.

Justin Chang of Variety gave Green Lantern a mixed review, stating that "Martin Campbell's visually lavish sci-fi adventure is a highly unstable alloy of the serious, the goofy and the downright derivative". Manohla Dargis of the New York Times was generally negative to the film, despite having some praise for Ryan Reynolds, Peter Sarsgaard, Mark Strong, and Angela Bassett. Christy Lemire of the Associated Press called it a "joyless amalgamation of expository dialogue and special effects that aren't especially special". Roger Ebert of the Chicago Sun-Times had mixed feelings: "Green Lantern does not intend to be plausible. It intends to be a sound-and-light show, assaulting the audience with sensational special effects. If that's what you want, that's what you get". British newspaper The Daily Telegraph named Green Lantern one of the ten worst films of 2011.

Todd McCarthy of The Hollywood Reporter gave it a positive review, saying the film "serves up all the requisite elements with enough self-deprecating humor to suggest it doesn't take itself too seriously". Reviewer Leonard Maltin felt that "the film offers a dazzling array of visual effects, a likable hero, a beautiful leading lady, a colorful villain, and a good backstory. It also doesn't take itself too seriously". Kenneth Turan of the Los Angeles Times wrote: "More science-fiction space opera than superhero epic, it works in fits and starts as its disparate parts go in and out of effectiveness, but the professionalism of the production make it watchable in a comic book kind of way".

=== Response from cast and crew ===
After he watched Green Lantern for the first time in March 2021, Reynolds tweeted, "Maybe it's the Aviation Gin talking, but #GreenLantern was nothing to fear! Hundreds of incredible crew and cast members did amazing work—and while it's not perfect, it ain't a tragedy. Next time I won't wait a decade to watch."

In August 2021, director Martin Campbell said, "The film did not work, really. That's the point, and I'm partly responsible for that. I shouldn't have done it. Because with something like Bond — I love Bond, and I watched every Bond film before I ever directed it. Superhero movies are not my cup of tea, and for that reason, I shouldn't have done it."

In December 2024 while promoting September 5, Sarsgaard later said while the film wasn't good, he enjoyed the experience on set including when he killed off Tim Robbins's character.

=== Accolades ===
Accolades received by Green Lantern
Award	Date of ceremony	Category	Recipient(s)	Result	Ref.
Hollywood Post Alliance Awards	November 10, 2011	Outstanding Sound – Feature Film	Green Lantern	Won	
Scream Awards	October 16, 2010	Most Anticipated Movie	Green Lantern	Won	
Scream Awards	October 16, 2011	Best Superhero	Ryan Reynolds (as Green Lantern)	Nominated	
People's Choice Awards	January 11, 2012	Favorite Movie Actor	Ryan Reynolds	Nominated (Note: Also for The Change-Up)	
People's Choice Awards	January 11, 2012	Favorite Movie Superhero	Ryan Reynolds (as Green Lantern)	Won	
People's Choice Awards	January 11, 2012	Favorite Action Movie Actor	Ryan Reynolds	Nominated	
Teen Choice Awards	August 7, 2011	Choice Movie Actor – Sci-Fi/Fantasy	Ryan Reynolds	Nominated	
Teen Choice Awards	August 7, 2011	Choice Movie Actress – Sci-Fi/Fantasy	Blake Lively	Nominated	

== Franchise ==
=== Cancelled sequel ===
In 2010, director Martin Campbell confirmed the possibility of a Green Lantern trilogy. Warner Bros. Pictures originally planned on Green Lantern being the first entry of a new DC film series, and commissioned a script for a sequel from Greg Berlanti, Michael Green, and Marc Guggenheim while filming for the first film was underway.

In August 2010, Michael Goldenberg was still attached to write the screenplay, based on the sequel treatment. The scene in the film's end credits showing a resurgence of the yellow power ring of fear, with Sinestro becoming corrupted by its dark power, teased the planned sequel.

In September 2011, Warner Bros., dismayed by the film's negative reviews and disappointing box office run, abandoned plans for sequels.

=== Cancelled DC Extended Universe reboot ===
In June 2013, David S. Goyer confirmed that Man of Steel would be the first film in the DC Extended Universe, implying that should the Green Lantern property be featured in an upcoming DC film, it would be a rebooted version. Later that year Goyer stated that he had interest in making a new feature film based on the titular character. By July 2015, Warner Bros. announced plans to release a solo Green Lantern film titled Green Lantern Corps, with an original release date scheduled for June 19, 2020. The film was to be an installment in the DC Extended Universe, with Hal Jordan and John Stewart as Green Lanterns in the film. In January 2016, Goyer and Justin Rhodes were attached to write the film's script and to produce the film, with Geoff Johns and Jon Berg as executive producers. As of November 2019, delivery of the script to Warner Bros. was anticipated for the end of that year. In March 2021, after the release of Zack Snyder's Justice League, the director's cut of Justice League, Zack Snyder revealed that a scrapped idea for the film had Batman meeting up with the Green Lantern Corps, with Ryan Reynolds appearing as an "additional lantern... to fill out the corps a bit". Snyder never spoke with Reynolds about this, however.

=== Cancelled Greg Berlanti television series ===
A 10 one-hour episodic Green Lantern television series separate from the film was in development for HBO Max from Marc Guggenheim and Seth Grahame-Smith with Berlanti Productions producing the series. The series was to focus on the Guy Gardner, Jessica Cruz, Simon Baz, and Alan Scott versions of Green Lantern alongside Sinestro and Kilowog. The version with Berlanti was confirmed to have been cancelled, with this new series focusing on Hal Jordan and John Stewart as part of DC Studios' new shared universe.

=== DC Universe reboot ===
In December 2022, DC Studios CEO James Gunn confirmed that the Green Lantern characters would be an important part of the new DCU. When he and co-CEO Peter Safran unveiled the first projects from their DCU slate later that month they included Lanterns, a new iteration of a long-in-development Green Lantern series. Safran said the series would be an Earth-based detective story and "a huge HBO-quality event" in the style of the series True Detective featuring Hal Jordan and John Stewart. Safran said the mystery that Jordan and Stewart investigate in the series leads into the main storyline for the DCU. In October 2024, Kyle Chandler and Aaron Pierre were cast as Jordan and Stewart respectively.

In July 2023, Nathan Fillion was cast as Guy Gardner in Superman. He is also set to reprise the role in Lanterns.

== In popular culture ==
The 2016 film Deadpool, which stars Reynolds as the titular character, refers to the film in two scenes: the opening scene, which features a drawing of Green Lantern, and a later scene where Deadpool (who breaks the fourth wall) insists that his suit must not be "green or animated". In Deadpool 2, there is a post-credits scene in which Deadpool travels back in time to kill Reynolds before he can make the film. Before that, in a 2018 advertising campaign for Deadpool 2 which also featured David Beckham, Reynolds (dressed as Deadpool) is seen apologizing for his critical and commercial flops, including Green Lantern, R.I.P.D., Self/less, and Blade: Trinity.

In the DC animated film Teen Titans Go! To the Movies (2018), Robin meets Green Lantern and mentions that there wasn't a Green Lantern film. He responds by stating "There was a Green Lantern movie...but we don't talk about that."

In a promotional video for Free Guy in 2019, Reynolds and Waititi, who costarred in both movies, jokingly denied that they had ever heard of Green Lantern.

In Sonic the Hedgehog 3 (2024), a reference is made to the film when the character of Dr. Ivo "Eggman" Robotnik, played by Jim Carrey, jokes to his grandfather Gerald, also played by Carrey, that he "hadn't seen [a nano-fist] since hate-watching [it] in 2011."

== See also ==
- Lanterns (TV series)
