= Abin Sur =

- Abin Sur as depicted in Tales of the Green Lantern Corps Annual #2 (February 1986). Art by Gil Kane (penciller and inker) and Anthony Tollin (colorist).

Publication information
- Publisher: DC Comics
- First appearance: Showcase #22 (September–October 1959)
- Created by: John Broome; Gil Kane

In-story information
- Alter ego: Abin Sur
- Species: Ungaran
- Place of origin: Ungara
- Team affiliations: Green Lantern Corps; Indigo Tribe; Black Lantern Corps; Justice Incarnate
- Notable aliases: Lagzia
- Abilities: Green Lantern power ring

Abin Sur is a superhero appearing in American comic books published by DC Comics. He was a member of the Green Lantern Corps and is best known as the predecessor of Green Lantern Hal Jordan, whom Abin Sur's power ring chose as his replacement. After the Infinite Crisis events, details of Abin Sur's past are altered, and he was revealed to be a brother-in-law of Sinestro and uncle of his daughter Soranik Natu.

Abin Sur has appeared in various media outside comics, primarily in association with Green Lantern. Peter Mark Richman, Corey Burton, and Arnold Vosloo have voiced the character in animated television series and films. Furthermore, Temuera Morrison portrays Abin in Green Lantern (2011).

== Publication history ==
Abin Sur first appeared in Showcase #22 and was created by John Broome and Gil Kane. In that story, his spaceship crashes on Earth. Due to his injuries, Abin was aware that his death was inevitable and he uses his power ring to search for a successor, a man without fear. The ring chooses Hal Jordan as the most suitable replacement and brings him to Abin, who gives him the ring before dying.

== Fictional character biography ==
Originally a history professor on the planet Ungara, Abin Sur is appointed Green Lantern of Space Sector 2814 in the mid-1860s. As a child, he became best friends with Ruch Ehr and later, by association, Munni Jah. The two were a couple and Abin secretly loved Munni, but never spoke openly of this.

Abin's origin story varies depending on the comic. In his original appearance in Showcase, his spaceship is caught in a band of yellow radiation surrounding Earth, and he is injured in the crash and unable to use his abilities. In the Silver Age Green Lantern comic, it is revealed this is after a battle with a Larifar, an alien that takes over minds and halts the ability of civilisations to conceive new ideas.

Later, his origin is that he fatally was injured before the crash by the pursuing Legion, and makes an emergency landing before his death.

In Green Lantern: Secret Origin, Abin journeys to Earth—the birthplace of the Black: the antithesis of the emotional spectrum that a prophecy predicts will "consume all light and all life"—to prevent the prophecy from being fulfilled. During his quest, Abin begins to lose his faith in his willpower and his ring, and begins to feel fear. Abin's weakened power enables his prisoner Atrocitus to break free and attack him, causing his ship to crash on Earth. In this telling, Abin is mortally wounded in the crash.

In the Spectre (vol. 4) comics, it is revealed that part of Abin's soul is being tortured in Hell, with another part accompanying Hal Jordan during his time as the Spectre. Eventually, Abin frees his soul from Hell and assists Hal on several spiritual adventures and metaphysical dilemmas. Abin's friends, Ruch Ehr and Munni Jah, summon his spirit to undergo the Karamm-Jeev Descent, a process of reincarnation in which he will be reborn as their daughter Lagzia. Abin is initially hesitant, as the Descent will destroy his current self. However, he relents after meeting the spirit of Lagzia, who exists alongside his past and future incarnations.

During some point in his life, Abin had a son, Amon Sur, who became the leader of the Black Circle crime syndicate. Amon is angry at his father for abandoning him for the Corps, and decides to take his anger out on all Green Lanterns. Amon later receives a duplicate of Sinestro's ring and joins the Sinestro Corps.

=== Blackest Night ===
In the "Blackest Night" storyline, the prophecy of the eponymous event is fulfilled and Abin Sur is resurrected as a Black Lantern. Abin and his sister Arin, who has also become a Black Lantern, arrive on Korugar to confront Sinestro and Hal Jordan. They are defeated by Jordan, Sinestro, Indigo-1, and Carol Ferris, who join their lights together to destroy the black rings and render Abin and Arin's corpses inert.

== Other versions ==
=== Earth-3 ===
An alternate universe version of Abin Sur from Earth-3 appears in Justice League (vol. 2) #26. This version's power ring hosted the malevolent, ancient entity Volthoom, which slowly destroys the mind and body of its bearer. Wishing to rid himself of Volthoom's influence, Sur deliberately crashes his ship on Earth and finds Joe Harrolds, a cowardly human janitor employed by Carol Ferris. Manipulated into believing that the ring has chosen him to wield its power, Harrolds accepts it and becomes the villainous Power Ring while Sur dies of his injuries in blissful joy.

=== Earth One ===
The corpse of an alternate universe version of Abin Sur from Earth One appears in Green Lantern: Earth One.

=== Flashpoint ===
An alternate timeline version of Abin Sur appears in Flashpoint and Convergence. This version survived his crash landing on Earth and became a White Lantern.

=== In Darkest Knight ===
An alternate universe version of Abin Sur appears in the one-shot In Darkest Knight. Following his death, this version of Sur's power ring chose Bruce Wayne as its wielder.

=== Multiversity ===
An alternate universe version of Abin Sur appears in The Multiversity. This version possesses horns and comes from an unidentified Earth that had recently finished World War II. After taking part in a war against Vandal Savage, he helps the save the multiverse from a cosmic army before joining a cross-dimensional group called Justice Incarnate.

=== Superman: Red Son ===
An alternate universe version of Abin Sur appears in Superman: Red Son. After his spacecraft crashed at Roswell, he died shortly after. J. Edgar Hoover arranges for Sur and his ship to be hidden in Area 51, where his ring and power battery are subject to reverse engineering by Lex Luthor that enables the creation of a "Green Lantern Marine Corps" led by Colonel Hal Jordan.

=== Superman: Last Son of Earth ===
An alternate universe version of Abin Sur appears in Superman: Last Son of Earth. He is shown to be indirectly responsible for a meteor crashing into Earth and wiping out all but one million human lives due to having prioritized settling a conflict between warring alien worlds in his sector.

=== World's Finest ===
An alternate universe version of Abin Sur appears in Elseworld's Finest: Supergirl & Batgirl. This version is a longtime member of the Justice Society who has visited Krypton many times and develops a bond with Supergirl.

=== Absolute Universe ===
An alternate universe version of Abin Sur appears in Absolute Green Lantern. This version is a large, four-armed alien, and the name Abin Sur is a title. The Abin Sur arrives on Earth in the town of Evergreen, Nevada, to induct several of its residents into the spectrum of light and combat Mogo. Sur gives Hal Jordan the power of the Black Hand, which Jordan ultimately uses to kill him.

== In other media ==
=== Television ===
- Abin Sur appears in the Challenge of the Superfriends episode "Secret Origins of the Super Friends", voiced by Dick Ryal.
- Abin Sur appears in the Superman: The Animated Series episode "In Brightest Day...", voiced by an uncredited Peter Mark Richman. This version was killed by Sinestro while his power ring chose Kyle Rayner.
- Abin Sur appears in the Robot Chicken DC Comics Special. This version was killed by a bear.
- Abin Sur appears in the Teen Titans Go! episode "Orangins".
- Abin Sur is mentioned in Lanterns as Hal Jordan's predecessor. This version was ordered by the Guardians to execute a captive Manhunter but chose instead to take his prisoner to hide on Earth out of pity. Fearing harm, the Manhunter fatally wounded Sur, who selected Jordan over John Stewart Sr. as his replacement due to the latter showing fear when contacted by Sur's ring.

=== Film ===
- Abin Sur appears in Justice League: The New Frontier, voiced by Corey Burton. This version was caught in the explosion of a US spacecraft called the Flying Cloud while it was traveling to Mars. Due in part to Hal Jordan co-piloting the spacecraft, Abin gives his power ring to him before dying.
- Abin Sur appears in Green Lantern: First Flight, voiced by Richard McGonagle. This version possesses a more alien appearance with horns and four-fingered hands. He was tasked by the Guardians of the Universe to work undercover in Kanjar Ro's gang after they stole the yellow element. However, one of Kanjar's underlings discovered Abin's identity and mortally wounded him. After stealing a ship, Abin crash-landed on Earth, was found by Hal Jordan, and gave his power ring to him before dying.
- Abin Sur appears in Green Lantern: Emerald Knights, voiced by Arnold Vosloo. Similarly to the events of "Green Lantern: Secret Origin", this version previously worked with Sinestro and was warned of his impending death and Sinestro's betrayal by Atrocitus. Additionally, his power ring was originally wielded by Avra, the first Green Lantern to use their ring to create constructs.
- Abin Sur appears in Green Lantern (2011), portrayed by Temuera Morrison. This version previously fought Parallax and used a starship to evacuate planets that the entity targeted. After being fatally wounded by Parallax, Abin flees in one of his starship's escape pods, crash-lands on Earth, and passes his power ring onto Hal Jordan before he dies. Abin's body is subsequently discovered and taken by the Department of Extranormal Operations (DEO), who task Hector Hammond with performing the autopsy, which results in Hammond being infected by Parallax's DNA.
- The Flashpoint incarnation of Abin Sur makes a non-speaking cameo appearance in Justice League: The Flashpoint Paradox. This version died before he could pass his power ring on to Hal Jordan, after which the U.S. government recovers his body and spaceship in an attempt to stop the war between Atlantis and Themyscira.
- The Superman: Red Son incarnation of Abin Sur appears in the self-titled film adaptation. Following his death, this version and his ship were discovered by the U.S. government in 1967. By 1983, U.S. scientists successfully reverse-engineer Abin's ring and grant its capabilities to Hal Jordan and a small team of soldiers so they can fight the Soviet Superman.

=== Video games ===
Abin Sur appears as a character summon in Scribblenauts Unmasked: A DC Comics Adventure.

=== Merchandise ===
- Abin Sur received a figure in Mattel's DC Universe Classics line as part of a two-pack with Hal Jordan. Additionally, a figure of Abin as a Black Lantern was released individually in a later wave.
- The Green Lantern (2011) incarnation of Abin Sur received a figure in the associated tie-in toy line.
