= Hector Hammond =

DC Comics supervillain

- Hector Hammond as depicted on the back cover of Green Lantern DC Special Blue Ribbon Digest #4 (October 1980). Art by Dick Giordano.

Publication information
- Publisher: DC Comics
- First appearance: Green Lantern (vol. 2) #5 (April 1961)
- Created by: John Broome; Gil Kane

In-story information
- Alter ego: Hector Hammond
- Species: Metahuman
- Team affiliations: The Society; Royal Flush Gang; Orange Lantern Corps
- Notable aliases: Wildcard, Ophidian
- Abilities: Genius-level intellect; Telepathy; Mind control; Telekinesis

Hector Hammond is a supervillain appearing in American comic books published by DC Comics. He is primarily an enemy of Green Lantern.

Peter Sarsgaard portrays Hammond in the 2011 film Green Lantern. A version of the character, real name Hector Gutierrez, appears in Lanterns, portrayed by Jason Manuel Olazabal.

== Publication history ==
Hector Hammond originally appeared in Green Lantern (vol. 2) #5 (April 1961) and was created by John Broome and Gil Kane.

== Fictional character biography ==
Hector Hammond is a petty criminal on the run from the law when he discovers the fragments of a meteor that previously landed in Africa, rapidly evolving Gorilla Grodd and the other gorillas of Gorilla City. Observing the meteor's mutagenic effects, Hammond kidnaps four scientists and exposes them to the meteor on a remote island. The radiation causes their intellects to evolve, but also has the side effect of sapping their wills. Hammond forces the scientists to use their heightened intellect to create inventions, which he sells for profit.

Green Lantern Hal Jordan asks his friend and mechanic, Thomas Kalmaku, to take on the role of the Green Lantern while Jordan investigates Hammond. Jordan creates a duplicate power ring and costume for Kalmaku to fool Hammond and tells him to fly above Coast City so it would be thought Green Lantern was there. Unaware of the impersonation, Hammond steals Kalmaku's ring and transforms him into a chimpanzee. Jordan confronts Hammond personally in a battle of power rings that ends only when the charge of Hammond's ring runs out, allowing Jordan to capture him and restore Kalmaku and the scientists. He removes the scientists' memory of their knowledge and gets rid of the inventions as well.

Hammond returns in Justice League of America #14 (September 1962). He manages to escape from prison and deliberately exposes himself to the meteorite. The radiation causes his brain to grow to enormous size, granting him psionic powers as well as immortality. He captures Green Lantern using a "de-memorizer" invented by Amos Fortune, but he is later captured. His body later becomes immobilized, and he loses the power to speak. Trapped in a motionless state, Hammond is still able to use his psionic powers to control the minds of others.

In a 1982 story arc of Justice League of America, Hammond forms the second incarnation of the second Royal Flush Gang. The group attacks and hospitalizes the members of the Justice League before Martin Stein, who exists in an intangible state as part of Firestorm, subdues Hammond on the astral plane.

=== After Green Lantern: Rebirth ===
Following the 2004-2005 miniseries Green Lantern: Rebirth, in which Hal Jordan is resurrected, vindicated for his past crimes as Parallax, and returns as the star of the Green Lantern core series, Hammond reappears as one of his adversaries. The Kroloteans, aliens who sent the meteor that gave him his powers, capture and experiment on Hammond, causing him to regain his capability of speech.

Hammond appears in Infinite Crisis as a member of Alexander Luthor Jr.'s Secret Society of Super Villains.

=== Green Lantern: Secret Origin ===
Hammond appears in the 2008 storyline Green Lantern: Secret Origin, a re-telling of Hal Jordan's first days as a Green Lantern. Hammond aspires to be Carol Ferris' boyfriend, feelings that are not reciprocated by Ferris, who merely went out to one dinner with him for business purposes as he is a private consultant for Ferris Aircraft. While inspecting Abin Sur's crashed spacecraft, Hammond is affected by the meteorite fragment used as a power source in its reactor, which gives him psychic powers.

=== Brightest Day ===
In the Brightest Day event, Hammond escapes from Belle Reve with help from Krona and pursues the entity trapped inside Larfleeze's lantern. Hammond attacks Larfleeze and Hal Jordan and swallows Larfleeze's battery, which enables the orange entity Ophidian to possess him. Ophidian attempts to kill Larfleeze, who is saved by Hal Jordan. Hammond regains control of his body, subdues Ophidian, and leaves to search for Carol Ferris.

=== The New 52 ===
In September 2011, The New 52 rebooted DC's continuity. In this new timeline, Hector Hammond first appears in Superman #18, seen comatose as a prisoner in S.T.A.R. Labs, where he suddenly recovers the ability to dream.

Hammond later appears in the "Psi War" story arc, where his body is stolen from S.T.A.R. Labs by H.I.V.E. agents. The H.I.V.E. Queen intends to use Hammond's mental powers to mentally enslave the world in preparation for Brainiac's return. However, Hammond is electrocuted by his life support system, awakening him from his medically induced coma.

Hammond connects with the minds of every citizen in Metropolis, causing them to act strange and attract Superman's attention. He breaks into H.I.V.E.'s headquarters located beneath Metropolis and confronts the H.I.V.E. Queen. Once she makes it clear that it is not an alliance she is seeking and that she merely sees him as a means to an end, he overpowers her and takes over H.I.V.E.

In Forever Evil, Hector Hammond is among the villains recruited by the Crime Syndicate of America to join the Secret Society of Super Villains.

=== Infinite Frontier ===
Following the restoration of the multiverse in Dark Nights: Death Metal, Hammond is restored to his human form and joins the Department of Extranormal Operations.

== Powers and abilities ==
Hammond in his mutated state exhibits genius level intellect, as well as potent telepathic and telekinetic abilities including mind reading, mind control, astral projection, levitation, projection of harmful psionic blasts, and on occasion displays the ability to absorb and mentally redirect Green Lantern's energy.

As the host of Ophidian, Hammond possesses the powers of an Orange Lantern without needing a power ring to access them.

=== Equipment ===
In some incarnations, his body has atrophied to the point where he cannot walk and he has to strap his head to a hoverchair to support its weight and serve as his mode of transportation.

== Other versions ==
=== Absolute Universe ===
An alternate universe version of Hector Hammond appears in the Absolute Universe, primarily in Absolute Green Lantern and Absolute Green Arrow. This version is a wealthy and flamboyant entrepreneur who joins the Justice League, a secret organization of influential villains responsible for ordering the assassination of Oliver Queen, in the one-shot Absolute Evil #1 (2025). In Absolute Green Arrow, Hammond becomes the target of a mysterious vigilante known as the Green Arrow Killer and recruits Dinah Lance to investigate. He is subsequently revealed to be conducting illegal human experimentation using a substance known as Miraclo, including an unsuccessful attempt to resurrect Queen. After his operations are exposed, Hammond is found hanged in an apparent suicide, leaving behind a confession claiming sole responsibility for his crimes.

=== Amalgam Comics ===
HECTOR (Highly Evolved Creature Totally Oriented for Revenge), a fusion of Hector Hammond and MODOK from Earth-9602, appears in the Amalgam Comics one-shot Iron Lantern.

=== Captain Carrot and His Amazing Zoo Crew! ===
Hector Hamhock, a funny animal version of Hector Hammond from Earth-C-Minus, appears in Captain Carrot and His Amazing Zoo Crew!.

=== Flashpoint ===
An alternate universe version of Hector Hammond appears in Flashpoint. This version is a civilian, consultant to Ferris Aircraft, and superior of Hal Jordan and Carol Ferris.

== In other media ==
=== Television ===
- Hector Hammond appears in the Teen Titans Go! episode "Orangins".
- Hector Hammond appears in Lanterns, portrayed by Jason Manuel Olazabal. This version is Hector Gutierrez, an engineering student who was instructed by individuals protecting a Manhunter to adopt the name "Hector Hammond" and pose as a wealthy businessman as a means of distracting Hal Jordan in exchange for technology to benefit his community.

=== Film ===
Peter Sarsgaard as Hector Hammond as he appears in Green Lantern.

Hector Hammond appears in Green Lantern, portrayed by Peter Sarsgaard. This version is a xenobiology professor, an old friend of Hal Jordan, and the embittered son of Senator Robert Hammond (portrayed by Tim Robbins). After Amanda Waller of the Department of Extranormal Operations (DEO) enlists him to conduct an autopsy on Abin Sur's body, Hammond is infected with Parallax's DNA, which grants him psychic powers and a mental link to Parallax. Despite being driven insane and slowly losing his ability to walk, Hammond takes a liking to his newfound powers, kills his father, and attempts to kill Jordan on Parallax's orders. After taking Carol Ferris hostage and stealing Jordan's power ring, Hammond is defeated by Jordan and killed by Parallax for his failure.

=== Video games ===
Hector Hammond appears as a character summon in Scribblenauts Unmasked: A DC Comics Adventure.
