= Simon Baz =

Comic book superhero in DC Comics

- Cover of Green Lantern (vol. 5) #0 (November 2012). Art by Doug Mahnke and Christian Alamy.

Publication information
- Publisher: DC Comics
- First appearance: The New 52 Free Comic Book Day Special Edition #1 (May 2012)
- Created by: Geoff Johns; Doug Mahnke

In-story information
- Full name: Simon Baz
- Species: Human
- Team affiliations: Green Lantern Corps; Justice League
- Partnerships: Jessica Cruz; Batman; Harcourt
- Notable aliases: Green Lantern; Solomon Baz (Earth-3 Doppelgänger)
- Abilities: Skilled marksman and gunsmith; Use of power ring grants: Flight; Force field; Generation of hard-light constructs; Real-time translation of all languages; Space & time travel; Energy projection & absorption; Material & mind alteration; Holographic projection; Phasing; Emerald sight; Environmental playback; Will empowerment; Invisibility and Light Refraction; Wormholes and Spatial warps; Limited cellular regeneration; Electromagnetic scanning; Galactic Encyclopedia; Ring duplication; Emergency homing beacon; Pocket dimensions; Resurrection; Security protocol; Preset conditions; Thought relay

Simon Baz, one of the characters known as Green Lantern, is a superhero appearing in American comic books published by DC Comics, created by writer Geoff Johns and artist Doug Mahnke. Baz is an officer of the Green Lantern Corps, an extraterrestrial police force. The character made his debut in 2012 following The New 52 relaunch as part of its Green Lantern story arc "Rise of the Third Army", in which he replaces Silver Age hero Hal Jordan as the Green Lantern of Earth's sector.

Prior to his debut, the character made an unnamed cameo in The New 52 Free Comic Book Day Special Edition #1. DC later added Baz to its flagship team-up title Justice League of America in 2013.

== Publication history ==
Simon Baz was created by Green Lantern writer Geoff Johns and artist Doug Mahnke. He is the first Middle-Eastern member of the Green Lantern Corps. Simon's heritage and hometown are influenced by Johns, who is half-Lebanese and a native of Detroit, Michigan. The tattoo on his right forearm reads الشجاعة (transliterated al-shaja'a), Arabic for "courage".

== Fictional character biography ==
=== Early life ===
Simon Baz is a Lebanese immigrant child living in Dearborn, Michigan. Growing up, Simon and his sister Sira were both persecuted due to their ethnicity. As a young adult, Simon got involved in street racing and eventually car theft; the former put his brother-in-law in a coma in the hospital. Simon is fired from his job and, in a moment of desperation, he steals a car. While trying to evade the police in the stolen vehicle, Simon finds out that there is a bomb in it. Simon drives the van into the abandoned car factory he was laid off from, knowing that no one will be hurt in the explosion. The resulting explosion is seen as an act of terrorism by the authorities, and Simon is brought in for questioning. As Simon is being interrogated, Hal Jordan and Sinestro's rings fuse and form a malfunctioning Green Lantern Power Ring that finds Simon and selects him as the new wielder, flying him away from captivity. With their suspect gone, the federal agents interrogate Amanda Waller about the situation, a transmission that Cyborg of the Justice League picks up. Cyborg relays the transmission to Batman and asks if anyone has spoken to Hal Jordan since he quit the League. Meanwhile, Simon lies on the ground, knocked out, while elsewhere, the Third Army begins to spread.

=== Rise of the Third Army ===
After waking up, Simon turns over a new leaf and helps stop the Third Army. However, he eventually runs into the Justice League, being wrongfully accused of taking Hal hostage. The Justice League track down Simon, but he is not willing to fight them until Batman tries to remove Sinestro's ring from Simon's finger. In doing so, the ring goes into defense mode and attacks the League. In a panic, Baz retreats and meets with his sister. Sira is able to track down the original owner of the van leaving Simon to try and clear his name. After finding who was involved of the bomb plot, the Third Army attacks the house and kills the terrorist and an FBI agent who was one of the federal agents interrogating Simon before.

Green Lantern B'dg arrives looking for Hal Jordan. B'dg helps Simon retrieve the dual message left by both Hal Jordan and Sinestro in his ring, which reveals that the Guardians of the Universe have gone insane and are replacing the Green Lantern Corps with their Third Army that will eventually take over the Universe. It is also revealed that Sinestro is responsible for Simon's selection as a Green Lantern and chose him due to their similarities. He also wanted his recruit to be the one to finally destroy the Guardians of the Universe. Simon learns how to recharge his ring by retrieving his Lantern in the Coast City Graveyard. After learning that his ring's charge could die on him, Simon takes a gun with him as a precaution. He learns from B'dg that his ring might be able to wake his brother-in-law from his coma. They head to the hospital where Simon is able to heal the damage to his brother-in-law's brain. Simon and B'dg then rescue Guy Gardner from prison. After defeating the Third Army that was sent after Guy, they all meet on the moon, while Guy is sent to Oa to stop the Guardians. Simon and B'dg enter the Book of the Black and encounter Black Hand.

=== Wrath of the First Lantern ===
At the end of "Rise of the Third Army", the First Lantern (Volthoom) escapes, intending to change reality to his will. Simon is with B'dg at the Chamber of Shadows, where Black Hand and the Templar Guardians are being held. A battle ensues between Simon and Black Hand, during which Black Hand sucks Simon into his ring. Simon is transported into the Dead Zone, where Sinestro and Hal are trapped. Sinestro tells Simon that he was killed by Black Hand. Hal says Simon cannot be dead because he still has the ring on. Sinestro then attacks Simon trying to get the ring. Since the ring is useless against Sinestro, Simon takes out his gun and fatally shoots him. However, Sinestro comes back to life because they are in the Dead Zone. Tomar-Re tells Hal that he believes the ring chose someone like Sinestro, not Hal, and that could explain Simon's brash personality. Simon offers to give Hal his ring but Hal objects, because the ring might reject Hal or believe Simon to be dead. Sinestro wakes and says he is going to get back at Simon, which makes Simon nervous. B'dg, with the help of the Templar Guardians, tries to retrieve Simon. Meanwhile, Simon's ring starts to split in two, with the new half trying to go to Hal. However, Sinestro tackles Hal to the ground and shows him the First Lantern torturing Carol Ferris. This puts fear in Hal's heart, so the ring goes to Sinestro, and he and Simon swap places with Black Hand. Simon is being strangled by Sinestro, but then he later lets Simon go and teleports to his home planet of Korugar, trying to defend himself. When Simon and B'dg arrive at Korugar and witness Sinestro attacking Carol and White Lantern Kyle Rayner, they stop him. While Simon tells Carol the message that Hal was truly alive in the Dead Zone, Sinestro struggles for Kyle's white ring and attempts to become a White Lantern himself, but it rejects him and returns to Kyle. When Sinestro flies off, Simon and B'dg team up with Kyle and Carol and are ready to fight against the First Lantern. In the final battle, Simon and the reserve Lantern Corps manage to kill the First Lantern.

=== Justice League of America ===
Following the events of "Wrath of The First Lantern", Simon Baz is offered the opportunity to join Amanda Waller and Steve Trevor's "Justice League of America" under the pretense that his criminal charges would be dropped and his innocence publicly declared after FBI Agent Franklin Fed vouched for him.

=== "Trinity War" ===
During the 2013 "Trinity War" storyline, Simon Baz is seen chasing Batman, who is in possession of Pandora's Box, until Superman attacks him. After Cyborg is mangled by Grid, Simon uses his ring to keep him alive.

=== "Lights Out" ===
During the 2013 "Lights Out" storyline, in need of the Red Lantern Corps' help during the fight with Relic, Hal Jordan promises to give Guy Gardner and the Red Lanterns their own sector of space. Guy chooses Sector 2814, which contains the Red Lanterns' homeworld of Ysmault as well as Earth, and declares that no Green Lantern can operate in the sector. However, Hal requests permission to keep Simon on Earth to keep an eye on things and be the Green Lantern Corps' ambassador.

=== "DC Rebirth" ===
Simon Baz stars in the DC Rebirth comic Green Lanterns protecting Sector 2814 alongside Jessica Cruz. After Simon and Jessica both fail a training exercise organized by Hal Jordan, he merges their power batteries into a form that requires the two to be in close proximity for their rings to work, as he needs to be sure they are skilled enough to defend Earth while he is away in deep space. During his absence, Hal also grants Simon and Jessica membership in the Justice League, hoping the other heroes will aid them in their training.

After several adventures, Batman confronts Simon about his gun and convinces him to give it up. Commissioner Gordon takes the weapon for safekeeping.

== Other versions ==
An alternate universe version of Simon Baz appears in Absolute Green Lantern. This version is an agent of the Department of Extranormal Operations (DEO) and a friend of Cameron Chase.

== Reception ==
Simon Baz's debut in Green Lantern #0 was overall met with positive reviews, praising Baz's characterization as well as the opportunities for social commentary provided by his background. Joey Esposito of IGN wrote: "Johns showcases Baz's strength of character by allowing him to admit that he is, in fact, a criminal (he was stealing a car), and that upon learning the car he jacked carried a bomb on board, he had heroic intentions. Johns is able to rely on the very real climate of a post-9/11 America to let readers infer certain aspects of Baz's younger years, leaving him ample space for a well-written interrogation scene that reveals more about both Baz and the agents interrogating him. Though it's only been one issue, I fully expect Baz – if he survives for a while, of course – to become another successful addition to Earth's Green Lanterns". Doug Zawisza of Comic Book Resources wrote of Baz: "Geoff Johns makes Baz a sympathetic character despite his obvious flaws. Make no mistake, Baz isn't a hero like Hal Jordan, but he also isn't a villain like Sinestro. He's a guy who is trying to get by the best he can and, right now, he's breaking a few rules to do that". He praised his relatability, saying that "Baz could very easily be a neighbor I knew when I lived in Dearborn".

Minhquan Nguyen of Weekly Comic Book Review praised Geoff Johns's writing of Baz in the site's review of issue #0: "Sometimes it's very easy to forget how strong a character writer Johns actually is. Unlike some of the powerhouses in that category, Johns can't quite pull off outlandish personalities and make them seem believable, but he churns out characters that sound and feel recognizable. We'd be less inclined to tune into Baz, hard as his life circumstances are, if he was disgustingly self-righteous. What makes him a hero is he recognizes his own fault and the logic of his seizure, which is probably why Agent Fed treats him so respectably—until his hands get tied, that is".

However, the character was not without its detractors. Writing for The A.V. Club, Oliver Sava felt that the character was conceptually interesting but marred by a hackneyed characterization. Reviewing Baz' introduction in Green Lantern #0, Sava says: "The idea of an Arab-American being chosen as the Green Lantern because he's able to overcome great cultural fear is an inspired one, but the majority of sympathy for the character is condensed in two pages so that Johns can set up Baz as a suspected terrorist". Sava comments that Baz shares a lot in common with "gritty" superheroes of the 1990s, saying that "Baz isn't so much a character as he is a series of clichés and coincidences". Sava was also critical of the decision to portray the character with a gun, which he derides as "ridiculous" given its lack of utility compared to a Green Lantern ring, calling it "a cheap move to make the character seem edgy... that fell out of style about 15 years ago".

== In other media ==
- Simon Baz appears as a character summon in Scribblenauts Unmasked: A DC Comics Adventure.
- Simon Baz appears as a playable character in Lego DC Super-Villains, voiced by Taliesin Jaffe.

== See also ==
- History of Middle Eastern people in Metro Detroit
