= Carol Ferris =

Fictional character in DC Comics

- Carol Ferris as depicted in Green Lantern vol. 4 #35 (November 2008). Art by Ivan Reis.

Publication information
- Publisher: DC Comics
- First appearance: As Carol Ferris: Showcase #22 (September–October 1959); As Star Sapphire: Green Lantern vol. 2 #16 (October 1962)
- Created by: John Broome; Gil Kane

In-story information
- Alter ego: Caroline "Carol" Ferris
- Species: Human
- Team affiliations: Star Sapphires; Justice Guild; Ferris Aircraft; Justice League
- Notable aliases: Star Sapphire; Predator
- Abilities: Skilled aircraft pilot; Use of power ring/gem grants: Star Sapphire energy conduit; Ring duplication; Force field generation; Energy blasts; Energy constructs; Phasing; Crystallization; Flight; Healing factor; Invisibility and light refraction; Wormhole creation; Limited regeneration; Electromagnetic scanning; Real-time translation of all languages; Material alteration; Emergency homing beacon; Thought relay; Rage immunity; Avarice immunity; True love sight and love attunement; Mind alteration via gem or feelings of jealousy

Caroline "Carol" Ferris is a fictional character appearing in the DC Comics Universe. She is one of many characters who has used the name Star Sapphire, and the long-time love interest of Hal Jordan, the Silver Age Green Lantern. In her role as Star Sapphire, Ferris has been active as both a supervillain and, more recently, as a superhero. Her initial design was based on Elizabeth Taylor.

Ferris has appeared in various media outside comics, primarily in association with Green Lantern. Kari Wahlgren, Jennifer Hale, Olivia d'Abo, and others have voiced the character in animated television series and films. Furthermore, Ferris appears in the film Green Lantern (2011), portrayed by Blake Lively, and the live-action series Lanterns (2026), portrayed by Amie MacKenzie.

== Publication history ==
Carol Ferris first appeared in Showcase #22, and was created by John Broome and Gil Kane. As a Star Sapphire, she first appeared in Green Lantern vol. 2 #16.

== Fictional character biography ==
=== Early history ===
Carol Ferris is Ferris Aircraft's vice president, as well as the only child of aerospace mogul Carl Ferris and his wife Christine. She hires Hal Jordan as a test pilot and quickly finds herself attracted to him. When Hal becomes the first human chosen to wield the power of the Green Lantern, he keeps it a secret from Carol.

Hal and Carol's romance is complicated when Carol takes over the company from her father and struggles to balance her new responsibilities with romance. When the Zamarons discover that she is in love with Green Lantern, a servant of their ancient rivals, the Guardians of the Universe, they abduct Carol and infuse her with a gem known as the Star Sapphire. Transformed, Carol is brainwashed and ordered to destroy Hal.

=== Predator ===
When Carol Ferris is cured of her Star Sapphire persona, she develops a third subconscious identity, the male "Predator". Deprived of Hal Jordan's love at the time, Carol finds everything she wants from a man in the Predator—masculinity, strength, and care. Physically separated from Carol's body, the Predator repeatedly appears as a mysterious figure, protecting Ferris Aircraft from the threats of Eclipso, the Demolition Team and Jason Bloch. He also establishes the company Intercontinental Petroleum (Con-Trol) to let her regain control of Ferris Aircraft. Finally, the Predator starts to court Carol (who does not know what the Predator really is) and battles Hal Jordan for her love. Hal defeats the Predator and witnesses him merging with Carol into Star Sapphire.

The Zamarons abandon their queen and their homeworld to live in another dimension with the Guardians of the Universe. Carol gets furious and vows revenge on Hal and the Green Lantern Corps. After several battles, Carol finds her chance to hurt her ex-lover and murder Katma Tui, whose power ring is rendered inert following the destruction of the main power battery on Oa.

The Green Lantern Corps purge Carol of Predator, saving her life in the process. Her time under the creature's control, along with the destruction of Coast City and the discovery that her father faked her mother's death, causes Carol to reject a distraught Hal Jordan. Instead, she opts to stay with her mother and find her own path.

Carol becomes the administrator of Extreme Justice's Mount Thunder facility. Her time with the team comes with the revelation that she is pregnant, despite not having sex in a long time. She realizes that Star Sapphire was not a subconscious identity created by her, but an energy-based being who inhabited her body. The child in her womb was conceived when the Predator raped the first Star Sapphire. Shortly after she gives birth, Neron appears and offers to purge her of both the Predator and Star Sapphire. Carol agrees, and then watches as the now separate entities are killed by Neron, who departs with their baby in his arms.

The Predator was later established to be one of several emotional entities who power the Lantern Corps, specifically powering the Star Sapphires. It had corrupted Carol and influenced her into killing Katma Tui.

=== End of Star Sapphire ===
In Green Lantern (vol. 3) #119, Hal (as the Spectre) decides to visit Carol. He makes himself visible and tells Carol he is going to help her, but that she will not remember his visit. He reaches into Carol and pulls out the Star Sapphire gem, which causes Star Sapphire herself to re-emerge (it appeared she was previously killed by Neron, but somehow a part of her survived in Carol). The Spectre detains Star Sapphire and puts her back into the gem. He hands the gem to Carol and lets her finish the job, destroying the Star Sapphire persona.

=== Return ===
Carol Ferris and the Predator in Brightest Day #17. Art by Ivan Reis.

The Star Sapphire crystal briefly repossesses Carol, before detecting that Hal Jordan had much stronger feelings for his fellow pilot, Jillian Pearlman, and abandoning her to instead bond with the latter. She and Hal work together to free Pearlman from the crystal. Knowing that she still loves Hal and that it is not fair to her husband, Carol files for divorce. The Star Sapphires, sensing the heartache Carol has been carrying over Hal, bring her back into the group.

After a failed attempt to combine the light of her power ring with the six lights coming from the other Corps-Leaders makes Nekron able to possess resurrected heroes, Ganthet forces a secret protocol in her ring, forcing Carol to seek out a deputy. Eventually, she deputizes Wonder Woman as a temporary Star Sapphire, due to her great ability to feel love, thus undoing Nekron's control of Wonder Woman. The Lanterns are then attacked by the Black Lantern Spectre. In an attempt to stop the Spectre, Hal releases Parallax's essence, deciding to join with him again to fight back. Carol tries to stop Hal, but he refuses to be swayed. Carol kisses Hal, telling him "I love you", before Hal allows Parallax to possess him. In the epilogue of Blackest Night, Carol wants to talk to Hal about their relationship, but Sinestro comes along and interrupts their talk to serve his own goals. She is in Las Vegas where she takes on the Predator who has possessed a man who is infatuated with a young woman to the point of obsession. She frees him from the Predator by kissing him. After that, Carol and Hal are taken to Zamaron. Having sacrificed the last of her power to preserve the Star Sapphire battery, the Queen names Carol her successor before dying.

=== The New 52 ===
In 2011, "The New 52" rebooted the DC universe. Carol, having renounced her role as a Star Sapphire (although she retains her power ring), bails Hal Jordan out of jail after he saw a woman being attacked on a film shoot and thinks it is real. Carol offers Hal a job at Ferris Aircraft, but not as a pilot because of insurance issues. Hal asks her out to dinner and Carol thinks he is going to propose. When he does not, she walks out on him and drives away, leaving him without a ride. Later, Carol is shocked by the TV news and finds Hal was working with Sinestro. After Hal returns to Earth, he asks Carol to take him back after telling her she is the one person he thought of when he thought he was going to die. Carol accepts Hal's apology and they renew their relationship.

When Sinestro forces Hal to assist him by threatening to kill Carol, she manages to slip on her power ring, but Hal and Sinestro are confronted by the Indigo Tribe, who take both of them and teleport away.

When Kyle Rayner comes to Ferris Aircraft looking for Hal, he and Carol witness Hal and Sinestro fighting Black Hand, prompting Carol to re-don her Star Sapphire ring to help Kyle fight off Black Hand's Black Lanterns. However, when they arrive at the scene of the fight, they discover nothing but more 'conventional' zombies and are informed that Hal and Sinestro are apparently dead. However, Carol rejects the idea that Hal is dead as the link between her heart and his which she can sense via her ring is still intact, with her ring's visions informing her that Kyle must unite the powers of all seven Corps in himself to stop this latest threat.

When the First Lantern is freed, he begins to drain off all the Lantern Corps of their emotions, minds, and memories with the intention of seeing how their life choices had changed them. In the illusions of Carol, she is battling the Atlantean warship on the carrier, but she eventually regains her Star Sapphire ring and escapes from the First Lantern's influencing powers. Carol locates Kyle and helps him after he is attacked by the First Lantern.

After getting a lock on Sinestro's location, Carol and Kyle arrive at the ruins of Korugar, where Sinestro attacks them both, blaming them for his home's destruction by the First Lantern. When Carol demands to know where Hal is, Sinestro states that Hal is dead, but Carol refuses to believe him and attacks. While they attack Sinestro, Green Lanterns Simon Baz and B'dg arrive and subdue Sinestro. Simon (who met Hal) tells Carol that Hal is alive, but trapped in the Dead Zone. In the final battle, Carol and the reserve Lantern Corps attack the First Lantern. When the First Lantern is finally destroyed, Carol reunites with Hal after he escapes from the Dead Zone.

Despite her past with Hal, Carol goes on to develop feelings for Kyle as she spends more time with him as he explores his White Lantern abilities, to the extent that she is one of the few people aware of his survival after he seemingly sacrifices himself to recharge the emotional spectrum. When Kyle splits the White Lantern ring into seven after realizing that the power is too great for him to control on his own, he chooses Carol as one of the six new members of the White Lantern Corps; however, she decides to keep her violet ring.

=== DC Rebirth ===
In 2016, DC Comics implemented another relaunch of its books called "DC Rebirth", which restored its continuity to a form much as it was prior to "The New 52". Carol is able to sense Hal's actions when he creates a ring out of willpower. Sometime later, Carol returns to Earth, and has broken up with Kyle Rayner. Hal thinks about her throughout the Hal Jordan and the Green Lantern Corps run, and his greatest desire is revealed to be having a family with her, as previously shown in the Book of Oa. When Carol and Hal finally reunite, they kiss.

=== Dawn of DC ===
Carol Ferris has broken up with Hal Jordan for unknown reasons, has given up her power ring, and is dating Nathan Broome. Hal Jordan asks to work for her, is briefly fired due to his recklessness, but is hired as her pilot. During the Knight Terrors event, Carol and Hal are among the heroes attacked by Insomnia. Hal Jordan's recent actions with Sinestro has caused Ferris Air to lose all of their military contacts which makes her company nearly bankrupt. While slightly intoxicated at a bar, she asks Nathan to marry her, and they travel to Las Vegas to hold a makeshift ceremony at a superhero theme chapel. Before they can exchange their vows, her Star Sapphire ring appears in front of her. She realized Hal is in need of help and that she still has feelings for him. She abandons Nathan, leading him to awaken the emotional spectrum of sorrow as the Sorrow Lantern.

In the DC All In initiative, Carol Ferris formally joins the Justice League as Star Sapphire.

== Powers and abilities ==
Carol is a capable pilot and administrator. As Star Sapphire, she can fly, survive in space, create constructs, and heal others using love energy.

== Other versions ==
- An alternate universe version of Carol Ferris appears in Whom Gods Destroy. This version is First Lady of the United States.
- An alternate universe version of Carol Ferris appears in JLA: The Nail.
- An alternate universe version of Carol Ferris appears in Green Lantern: Evil's Might.
- An alternate universe version of Carol Ferris appears in DC: The New Frontier.
- An alternate universe version of Carol Ferris appears in Justice.
- An alternate universe version of Carol Ferris appears in Flashpoint.
- Carol Ferris appears in Star Trek/Green Lantern: The Spectrum War.
- An alternate universe version of Carol Ferris appears in Absolute Green Lantern. This version is Hector Hammond's assistant.

== Reception ==
Carol Ferris was ranked 36th in Comics Buyer's Guide's "100 Sexiest Women in Comics" list. Star Sapphire was ranked fourth on Comicverse's "Top 5 DC Comics Villains Turned Heroic" list.

== In other media ==
=== Television ===
Carol Ferris / Star Sapphire as she appears in Justice League

- Carol Ferris as Star Sapphire appears in the DC Animated Universe (DCAU) series Justice League and Justice League Unlimited, voiced by Olivia d'Abo. This version is a member of Lex Luthor and Aresia's Injustice Gangs and Gorilla Grodd's Secret Society.
- Carol Ferris as Star Sapphire appears in Batman: The Brave and the Bold, voiced by Rachel Quaintance and Vicki Lewis respectively. In the episode "Scorn of the Star Sapphire!", Ferris is abducted by the Zamarons, who imbue their queen's spirit into her before bestowing her with a violet power ring, causing her to lose control of her body. Star Sapphire attempts to open a portal to allow a Zamaron army to invade Earth, but Hal Jordan and Batman repel the invasion while Ferris regains control and casts Star Sapphire out of her body, leaving her with no memory of the events.

Carol Ferris / Star Sapphire as she appears in Green Lantern: The Animated Series

- Carol Ferris as Star Sapphire appears in Green Lantern: The Animated Series, voiced by Jennifer Hale. This version is initially Hal Jordan's girlfriend and unaware of his secret identity as a Green Lantern. In the episode "...In Love and War", the Star Sapphires give her a ring and bring her to their home world, where she learns Hal Jordan became a Green Lantern. Furious at seeing him with another girl, Ferris attacks him, but ultimately relinquishes her ring and returns to Earth after Jordan helps her come to her senses. In the episode "The New Guy", she breaks up with him. In the episode "Love is a Battlefield", she regains her ring to battle Atrocitus, renews her relationship with Jordan, and decides to keep her ring.
- Carol Ferris appears in the Young Justice episode "Depths", voiced by Kari Wahlgren.
- Carol Ferris as Star Sapphire makes non-speaking appearances in Justice League Action.
- Carol Ferris as Star Sapphire appears in DC Super Hero Girls (2019), voiced again by Kari Wahlgren. This version is a teenager and member of the Super Villain Girls obsessed with her ex-boyfriend, Hal Jordan, who broke up with her on Valentine's Day, and became Star Sapphire to get revenge on him and destroy Jessica Cruz, who she believes is Jordan's new girlfriend.
- Carol Ferris appears in the Lanterns episode "Bad Optics", portrayed by Amie MacKenzie.

=== Film ===
- Carol Ferris appears in Justice League: The New Frontier, voiced by Brooke Shields.
- Carol Ferris appears in Green Lantern: First Flight, voiced again by Olivia d'Abo.

Blake Lively as Carol Ferris in Green Lantern.

- Carol Ferris appears in Green Lantern, portrayed by Blake Lively. This version is a childhood friend of Hector Hammond and Hal Jordan and the vice president of Ferris Aircraft.
- Carol Ferris as Star Sapphire appears in Justice League: Doom, voiced again by Olivia d'Abo. This version became Star Sapphire after Hal Jordan broke her heart in an unspecified manner and developed a desire to kill him ever since, which leads to her being recruited into Vandal Savage's Legion of Doom to kill the Justice League. As part of Savage's plans, Ferris breaks Jordan's will by exposing him to a diluted version of Scarecrow's fear gas and using an android replica of herself to make him believe she had been killed by a terrorist who he could have easily stopped. As he mourns Ferris' apparent death, she berates him for his failure to save her and for driving her to become a Star Sapphire. Jordan briefly relinquishes his ring, but Batman arrives and reveals Ferris' deception. After regrouping, the League storms the Hall of Doom, where Jordan engages Ferris in battle before defeating her and taking her gem.
- A character based on Carol Ferris, renamed Carrie Farris, appears in the DC Extended Universe (DCEU) films Man of Steel and Batman v Superman: Dawn of Justice, portrayed by Christina Wren. This version is a U.S. Air Force officer who served as the assistant for Calvin Swanwick.
- Carol Ferris as Star Sapphire appears in Teen Titans Go! & DC Super Hero Girls: Mayhem in the Multiverse, voiced again by Kari Wahlgren. This version is a member of the Legion of Doom.
- Carol Ferris as Star Sapphire makes non-speaking cameo appearances in Justice League: Crisis on Infinite Earths.

=== Video games ===
- Carol Ferris as Star Sapphire appears in DC Universe Online as part of the "War of the Light Part 2" DLC pack.
- Carol Ferris as Star Sapphire appears as a playable character in Lego Batman 3: Beyond Gotham, voiced again by Olivia d'Abo.
- Carol Ferris as Star Sapphire appears as a playable character in Infinite Crisis.
- Carol Ferris as Star Sapphire appears as a playable character in DC Unchained.
- Carol Ferris as Star Sapphire appears as a character summon in Scribblenauts Unmasked: A DC Comics Adventure.
- Carol Ferris as Star Sapphire appears as a support card in Injustice 2.
- Carol Ferris as Star Sapphire appears as a playable character in Lego DC Super-Villains, voiced again by Jennifer Hale.
- Carol Ferris as Star Sapphire appears in DC Super Hero Girls: Teen Power, voiced again by Kari Wahlgren.

=== Miscellaneous ===
- Carol Ferris as Star Sapphire appears in the graphic audio novel Green Lantern Sleepers #3.
- Carol Ferris appears in Young Justice #11.
- Carol Ferris appears in the Injustice: Gods Among Us prequel comic as Hal Jordan's on-and-off girlfriend.
- Carol Ferris as Star Sapphire appears in DC Super Hero Girls (2015) and its tie-in films, voiced by Jessica DiCicco.

=== Merchandise ===
- An action figure of Carol Ferris as Star Sapphire was sold in a 3-pack with action figures of Black Hand and Green Lantern.
- An action figure of Carol Ferris as Star Sapphire was sold as part of wave two of Mattel's DC Universe Classics Green Lantern sub-line.
