= Hal Jordan =

DC Comics superhero

- Hal Jordan as depicted in Green Lantern Gallery #1 (December 1996). Art by Gil Kane (penciler), Kevin Nowlan (inker), and Matt Hollingsworth (colorist).

Publication information
- Publisher: DC Comics
- First appearance: Showcase #22 (September–October 1959)
- Created by: John Broome; Gil Kane

In-story information
- Full name: Harold Jordan
- Place of origin: Coast City
- Team affiliations: Green Lantern Corps; Justice League; U.S. Air Force; White Lantern Corps
- Partnerships: Green Lantern partners: Kyle Rayner; Guy Gardner; John Stewart; Kilowog; Other hero partners: Flash (Barry Allen); Green Arrow
- Notable aliases: Green Lantern; Parallax; Spectre; Highball; Human Starburst; Sky-Knight; The Emerald Knight; The Man Without Fear; Master builder
- Abilities: Trained aircraft pilot; Skilled hand-to-hand combatant; Indomitable will; Use of power ring grants: Generation of solid light constructs; Flight; Enhanced strength, speed, and durability; Energy blasts; Energy absorption; Force field; Real-time translation of all languages; Space travel; Threat signaling; Limited cellular regeneration; Galactic encyclopedic knowledge; Invisibility; Intangibility; Mind reading; Matter manipulation; Time travel

Harold "Hal" Jordan, one of the characters known as Green Lantern, is a superhero appearing in American comic books published by DC Comics. The character was created in 1959 by writer John Broome and artist Gil Kane, and first appeared in Showcase #22 (September–October 1959). Hal Jordan is a reinvention of the previous Green Lantern, who appeared in 1940s comic books as the character Alan Scott. While Alan Scott had been designed after characters from folklore and mythology, Kane instead drew visual inspiration for Hal from Hollywood actor Paul Newman.

Hal Jordan is a former fighter pilot who works for Ferris Aircraft as a test pilot, a member and occasionally leader of an intergalactic police force called the Green Lantern Corps, as well as a founding member of the Justice League, DC's flagship superhero team, alongside well-known heroes such as Batman, Superman, and Wonder Woman. He fights evil across the universe with a power ring that channels willpower into energy constructs. As Green Lantern, Hal is the assigned protector of Sector 2814, which includes Earth, on behalf of the Guardians of the Universe. His ring grants him powers of flight, space travel, and the ability to create shields, weapons, and even his uniform. Hal's on-again off-again love interest is Carol Ferris, who has also at times served as his enemy Star Sapphire. Other villains in Hal's stories include the psychic mutant Hector Hammond, avatar of death Nekron, and his archenemy Sinestro, Hal's corrupt former Green Lantern mentor.

During the 1990s, Jordan also appeared as a villain. The Emerald Twilight and Zero Hour: Crisis in Time! storylines see him become the villain Parallax following Mongul's destruction of his hometown Coast City, kill most of the Green Lantern Corps, and threaten to destroy the universe. In subsequent years, Parallax is revealed to be an evil cosmic entity who corrupted Jordan. Between his stint as Parallax and return to being a Green Lantern, Jordan also briefly served as the Spectre, an agent of God and the embodiment of his wrath. In 2012, DC editors also revealed that the character is Jewish, making him one of the most high-profile Jewish characters in comic books.

Outside of comics, Hal Jordan has appeared in various animated projects, video games, and live-action. Hal Jordan's first live-action appearance was in the 1978 television special Legends of the Superheroes, where he was played by Howard Murphy. He made his cinematic debut in the film Green Lantern (2011), portrayed by Ryan Reynolds. He is portrayed by Kyle Chandler in the DC Universe series Lanterns (2026). In animation, Jordan has notably been voiced by Jonah Hill, Nathan Fillion, Michael Rye, and Josh Keaton. The character is routinely ranked among the most popular comic book characters of all time.

== Publication history ==
=== Recreated for the Silver Age ===
Broome had originally conceived of the character years prior to his debut in a story featuring Captain Comet in Strange Adventures #22 (July 1952) entitled "Guardians of the Clockwork Universe".

After achieving great success in 1956 in reviving the Golden Age character The Flash, DC editor Julius Schwartz looked toward recreating the Green Lantern from the Golden Age of Comic Books. Drawing from his love for science-fiction, Schwartz intended to show the new Green Lantern in a more modern light, enlisting writer John Broome and artist Gil Kane, who in 1959 would reintroduce Green Lantern to the world in Showcase #22 (September–October 1959) by creating Hal Jordan.

The character was a success, and it was quickly decided to follow up his three-issue run on Showcase with a self-titled series. Green Lantern #1 began in July–August 1960 and would continue until #89 in April–May 1972.

Starting in issue #17, Gardner Fox joined the book to share writing duties with John Broome. The quartet of Schwartz, Broome, Fox, and Kane remained the core creative team until 1970.

=== O'Neil/Adams and socially-conscious Green Lantern/Green Arrow ===
Starting with issue #76 (April 1970), Dennis O'Neil took over scripting and Neal Adams, who had drawn the cover of issue #63, became the series' artist. O'Neil and Adams had already begun preparation for the classic run in the form of their re-workings of another DC superhero, the archer Green Arrow.

Three panels ushering in the O'Neil/Adams run in Green Lantern #76.

In an introduction to the 1983 reprinting of this O'Neil/Adams run, O'Neil explains that he wondered if he could represent his own political beliefs in comics and take on social issues of the late sixties and early seventies. O'Neil devised the idea of portraying Hal Jordan, effectively an intergalactic law enforcement officer, as an establishment gradualist liberal figure against Oliver Queen (Green Arrow), who O'Neil had characterized as a lusty outspoken anarchist who would stand in for the counter-culture movement. The first of these socially motivated Green Lantern/Green Arrow stories was written with Gil Kane slated to be the artist, but Kane dropped out and was replaced by Neal Adams. The stories tackled questions of power, racism, sexism, and exploitation, and remain viewed in the comics community as the first socially-conscious superhero stories.

Despite the work of Adams and O'Neil, Green Lantern sales had been in a major decline at the time Green Arrow was brought on as co-star, and their stories failed to revive the sales figures. Green Lantern was canceled with issue #89 (April/May 1972), and the climactic story arc of the Green Lantern/Green Arrow series was published as a back-up feature in The Flash #217 through #219. In sharp contrast to the socially relevant tales which preceded it, this story centered on emotional themes, with Green Arrow struggling to deal with the guilt of having killed a man. Green Lantern continued to appear in backup stories of Flash from 1972 until the Green Lantern title was resumed in 1976.

=== 1980s exile ===
In Green Lantern #151 (April 1982) through #172 (January 1984), Jordan is exiled into space for a year by the Guardians to prove his loyalty to the Green Lantern Corps, having been accused of paying too much attention to Earth when he had an entire "sector" of the cosmos to patrol. When he returns to Earth, he finds himself embroiled in a dispute with Carol Ferris. Faced with a choice between love and the power ring, Jordan resigns from the Corps. The Guardians call Jordan's backup, John Stewart, to regular duty as his replacement.

In 1985, the "Crisis on Infinite Earths" storyline that rebooted much of DC Comics' character continuity saw Jordan again take up the mantle of Green Lantern. The new Corps, with seven members residing on Earth, included several aliens, John Stewart, and Guy Gardner. Jordan becomes romantically involved with a teenaged alien Lantern named Arisia Rrab after she used her ring to age herself into an adult body and mind. The alien Lanterns take a more direct hand in human affairs, a fact not appreciated by human governments. Eventually, the Earth corps break up, several members returning to their home sectors. The Guardians soon return to this dimension, and Jordan works with them to rebuild the fractured Corps.

=== 1990s ===
During this time, the character's origin story is re-told and expanded in two limited series by Keith Giffen, Gerard Jones, and James Owsley, Emerald Dawn and Emerald Dawn II. The first series expanded the role of the Corps in his origin and also provided more details about his childhood and his relationship with his father and brothers, while the sequel detailed the role of Jordan in the downfall of Sinestro.

In the 1992 prestige format graphic novel Green Lantern: Ganthet's Tale, Hal Jordan first encounters Ganthet, one of the Guardians of the Universe. Ganthet asks Hal to help him battle a renegade Guardian who has attempted to use a time machine to change history.

==== Reign of the Supermen, Destruction of Coast City, and transformation into Parallax ====
Hal Jordan becomes Parallax. Interior artwork from Green Lantern vol. 3, 50 (March 1994) . Art by Darryl Banks.

In the 1993 Reign of the Supermen! storyline, the alien tyrant Mongul and his forces destroy Coast City (Jordan's former home), murdering all of its seven million inhabitants, while Jordan was off world. Angered, he flies to Engine City and attacks Mongul, eventually knocking him out with Steel's hammer. This leads into the Emerald Twilight arc, which sees Jordan using his power ring to recreate Coast City as an instrument in the process of overcoming his grief, and talking to ring-created versions of his old girlfriend and parents. After his ring's power expires, a projection of a Guardian appears and admonishes him for using the ring for personal gain and summons him to Oa (the homeworld of the Guardians and the Green Lantern Corps) for disciplinary action. Angered at what he sees as the Guardians' ungrateful and callous behavior, Jordan absorbs the energy from the Guardian's projection, goes insane and attacks Oa to seize the full power of the Central Power Battery (the source of power for all Green Lanterns), defeating and severely injuring several members of the Green Lantern Corps in the process, taking their power rings as his own and leaving them to die in space. He arrives on Oa and kills Kilowog and Sinestro, and the Guardians commit suicide to pool all their life force in Ganthet. He then renounces his life as Green Lantern, adopting the name Parallax after absorbing the Power Battery's vast powers.

Ganthet designates Kyle Rayner to replace Jordan as the Green Lantern of Earth when Rayner comes into possession of the last power ring, created from the shattered remains of Jordan's. Guy Gardner has visions of the Green Lantern Corps' destruction and his yellow power ring's energy (being powered by residual Green Lantern's energy) starts to fluctuate. Soon after, Gardner goes to Oa to investigate, bringing Martian Manhunter, Darkstar (Ferrin Colos), The Ray, Wonder Woman, Captain Atom, Alan Scott, and Arisia Rrab with him. Jordan uses the element of surprise, attacks, and easily defeats them, leaving Guy in a coma. After the battle, Jordan sends them all back to Earth warning them to leave him alone in the future. Not long afterwards, Parallax attempts to rewrite history to his own liking with the help of Extant in the universe-wide event Zero Hour: Crisis in Time!. Parallax destroys the Time Trapper and attempts to remake the universe into a perfect, peaceful place, causing time disruptions throughout the universe. Superman, Kyle Rayner, and Metron call upon Earth's heroes to stop the mysterious disturbances. Jordan and Extant are eventually defeated when Hal exhausts most of his power from both fighting and manipulating the time stream. Green Arrow then takes advantage of Jordan's drained state and shoots an arrow into his chest.

Jordan makes a brief and redemptory appearance as Parallax in the 1996 Final Night miniseries/crossover storyline, apparently sacrificing his life to combat a threat to the Solar System.

==== Transformation into Spectre ====
Hal Jordan as the Spectre's host. Interior artwork from Day of Judgment: Secret Files and Origins 1 (Nov. 1999, DC Comics) Art by Howard Porter

In the 1999 miniseries Day of Judgment, Jordan becomes the newest incarnation of the Spectre, released from Purgatory after a fallen angel attempted to take that power. Soon after assuming this mantle, Jordan chooses to bend his mission from a spirit of vengeance to one of redemption, also making other appearances through some of DC Comics' other story lines, such as advising Superman during the Emperor Joker storyline (where the Joker steals the reality-warping power of Mister Mxyzptlk) and erases all public knowledge of Wally West's identity as the Flash after his terrible first battle with Zoom, which led to his wife miscarrying their twins. He also appeared in a four-part story arc in the series Legends of the DC Universe (issues #33–36). A new series based on this premise, titled The Spectre (vol. 4), ran for 27 issues from 2001 to 2003. In it, Hal loses his beloved brother Jack Jordan to a supernatural assassin. After the series ended, Jordan was forced to return, temporarily, to the Spectre's mission of vengeance, following a confrontation between the new Justice Society of America and the Spirit King, an old foe of the Spectre, and Mister Terrific, who had managed to "resurrect" the ghosts of all those the Spectre had damned to Hell when Jordan's attempt to turn the Spectre's mission to redemption weakened his hold on the damned, until Hal 'accepted' his original mission of vengeance.

During the Identity Crisis storyline, Green Arrow visits Jordan at his grave, asking to exact revenge on Sue Dibny's killer. Although Hal admits knowing the culprit's identity, he refuses Oliver's request in service to a higher purpose, implying to Oliver that the killer would eventually be caught, thus explaining the Spectre's inaction.

=== 2000s ===
In 2004, DC launched the Green Lantern: Rebirth miniseries, which brought Hal Jordan back to life and made him a Green Lantern once again, and in a redesigned Corps uniform. Shortly after the conclusion of Rebirth, DC Comics began a new Green Lantern (vol. 4) series, beginning with a new #1 and retconning his past murders as Parallax as the result of an intergalactic fear-driven parasite. The Green Lantern Corps has also been successfully rebuilt. Despite the revelation that Hal's past villainous activity was because of the influence of the parasite Parallax, many of his fellow Corps officers are unwilling to trust him. Even Jordan, on some levels, believes the reason that Parallax succeeded in possessing him was that he surrendered to it, and thus acknowledges that he truly has a dark side. Despite being freed from Parallax, his trauma occasionally triggers self-doubt and a lack of confidence. He is no longer the reckless daredevil he once was, but his powerful will remains intact to counter his fears. Jordan also becomes friends with Kyle Rayner after their first battle with Parallax. In the new volume, Jordan moves to the nearly deserted Coast City, which is slowly being rebuilt. Reinstated as a pilot in the United States Air Force, Jordan now works in the test pilot program at Edwards Air Force Base. The series introduces new supporting characters for Hal, including a man from his and his late father's pasts, Air Force General Jonathan "Herc" Stone, who learns his secret identity during a battle with the Manhunters and acts as his ally. He also begins to develop a romantic attraction with his fellow pilot, the beautiful Captain Jillian "Cowgirl" Pearlman. Returning characters also include Carol Ferris, Tom Kalmaku, and Jordan's younger brother James Jordan with his sister-in-law Susan and their children, Howard and Jane.

In this new title, he faces revamped versions of his Silver Age foes such as Hector Hammond, Shark, and Black Hand. A new account of Green Lantern's origins is also released as part of this series. In this new origin, Hal Jordan is working as an assistant mechanic under Tom Kalmaku, barred from flying due to his insubordination while in the USAF and his employer's lingering guilt about his father's death in the line of duty. Green Lantern Abin Sur, while fighting the villain Atrocitus, crashes near Coast City. Knowing he is close to death, Sur sends his ring to seek a replacement (as all rings do when their wearer dies), and his ring fetches Jordan. Sur then informs Jordan that he is to replace him as the Green Lantern of Sector 2814.

==== Infinite Crisis ====
As part of DC's 2006 event Infinite Crisis, Hal helps briefly with the attack of the OMACs and Brother Eye. He also fights alongside a group of heroes against the Secret Society of Super Villains, defending Metropolis. Guy Gardner leads the Green Lantern Corps attack against Superboy-Prime with Hal appearing in the group.

As part of DC's post–Infinite Crisis retconning of the entire universe, all current stories skipped ahead one year in an event called One Year Later. This brought drastic changes to Hal Jordan's life, as with every other hero in the DC Universe. It is revealed that Jordan spent time as a P.O.W. in an unnamed conflict and has feelings of guilt from his inability to free himself and his fellow captives.

==== Sinestro Corps War and other Pre-Flashpoint stories ====
Hal and the rest of the Green Lantern Corps find themselves at war with Sinestro and his army, the Sinestro Corps during the events of the Sinestro Corps War. As a Green Lantern native to Earth, Hal is featured in the Final Crisis miniseries by Grant Morrison.

In the Agent Orange story arc, Jordan is briefly in command of Larfleeze's power battery after he steals it from him in a battle. The orange light of avarice converses with Jordan, his costume changes, and he becomes the new Agent Orange. However, Larfleeze quickly takes his power battery back.

Jordan is also a character of focus in the new Justice League of America series as a charter member of the revamped JLA. He is also involved in the first plotline of the Brave and the Bold monthly series, teaming up first with Batman and later Supergirl. When teamed with the fledgling Supergirl, Hal is very impressed with her cleverness, although he finds her flirtatious behavior somewhat unnerving.

In the Justice League: Cry for Justice miniseries, Hal leads his own Justice League with Green Arrow, Shazam, Supergirl, Congorilla, Starman, Batwoman, and the Atom (Ray Palmer and Ryan Choi) to avenge the deaths of Martian Manhunter and Batman. Jordan eventually recruits some of the former Titans members for the League's new lineup, including Batman's successor Dick Grayson, Donna Troy, and Starfire.

=== 2010s ===
During the Blackest Night event, Hal allies himself with six other Lantern Corps during The War of Light. He finds himself facing many of his deceased allies, enemies, and people he failed to save reanimated as undead Black Lanterns under the control of the Green Lantern Corps' ancient enemy Nekron. Hal finds himself not only teaming up with Barry Allen, who is also resurrected from his death, but also must work with his enemies Sinestro, Atrocitus, Larfleeze, and his former lover Carol Ferris.

==== The New 52 ====
In 2011, after the universe-altering event Flashpoint, DC Comics relaunched its entire line of stories. In this era, Jordan returns to civilian life on Earth, having been discharged from the United States Air Force. This iteration of the hero, written by Geoff Johns and Robert Venditti, sees him team up with Sinestro as the pair encounter ramifications of the Brightest Day/Blackest Night storylines, as well as a crossover with New Gods characters in Green Lantern: Godhead.

Hal Jordan is featured as a part of Justice League series relaunch as well. The initial issues of the title take place five years prior as Jordan assists Batman against a mysterious threat. It is shown he is already friends with Barry Allen and each know the other's secret identity. Hal also believes with the ring he can overcome anything by himself by sheer force of will. This leads to reckless behavior that almost gets him killed. It is only when Batman reminds him of his mortality by revealing his own identity as Bruce Wayne that Hal reconsiders his approach. Five years after the team forms, Green Lantern resigns from the Justice League in an effort to keep the group functioning after his behavior put the team in peril during their fight with David Graves. Subsequently, he returns to the Justice League to help Jessica Cruz learn how to control her powers.

In the aftermath, Hal gets a new look as he goes rogue from the Green Lantern Corps to create a scapegoat for the Corps and be the focus of the universe's blame and distrust for recent events, such as the Third Army's assault or Relic's attack. The Corps itself – unaware of Jordan's intentions to show the universe that the Green Lanterns are not corrupt and will go after one of their own – believes that he has actually betrayed them when he attacks Kilowog. Along the way, Jordan steals a Green Lantern prototype gauntlet and power pack from the armoury, allowing him to continue to operate as a hero without the need for a power ring, although he is sometimes required to fight other Lanterns to maintain the illusion of independence.

==== DC Rebirth ====
In 2016, DC Comics implemented another relaunch of its books called "DC Rebirth", which restored its continuity to a form much as it was prior to "The New 52". Jordan returns to Earth temporarily to assign Simon Baz and Jessica Cruz the task of protecting Earth while he and the rest of the human Green Lanterns are away. He takes their power batteries and fuses them into a single battery to help the two bond as Lantern partners.

Subsequently, in DC Rebirth, Hal returns as Green Lantern again, now equipped with his self-constructed power ring, searching for the rest of the Green Lanterns and hunting down the Sinestro Corps. Hal takes on several Yellow Lanterns before fighting Sinestro and getting injured. He is healed by Soranik Natu, Sinestro's daughter who now is a Yellow Lantern like her father. After being healed, he takes on and defeats Sinestro and saves Guy Gardner, who was being tortured by Sinestro. Hal is now reunited with the Green Lanterns who have entered a war with the Sinestro Corps. The battle leads them to Xudar, the home planet of Green Lantern Tomar-Tu. As they fight, Braniac shrinks the planet with the Lanterns in it. The shrunken planet is given to the Grand Collector which turns out to be Larfleeze. Hal is believed to be dead in the destruction that came with the shrinking of the planet. He has been transported to the Emerald Space, an afterlife for deceased Lanterns. Guardians, Ganthet and Sayd call upon White Lantern Kyle Rayner to rescue Hal. Kyle pulls him out of the Emerald Space and the two meet up with the rest and escape from the shrunken planet and restore it. Larfleeze escapes with his orange construct Lanterns. The Green and Yellow Lanterns form an alliance. At the end of the run, Hal Jordan reconciles with Carol Ferris.

Jordan appears with the Justice League in the Dark Nights: Metal miniseries.

==== The Green Lantern ====
With writer Grant Morrison taking the helm, Jordan returns to interstellar duty and infiltrates the Blackstars to discover a mole within them. He later becomes a full member of the Blackstars and reassumes the Parallax mantle before seemingly sacrificing himself to stop Mu's U-Bomb. However, he is rescued by his ring and meets its artificial intelligence, Pengowirr. Hal reunites with Green Arrow and goes on an adventure busting up an assassin from a cosmic cartel of Hadea Maxima, while dealing with a drug dealer from Dimension Zero, Glorigold DeGrande.

=== 2020s ===
==== Infinite Frontier ====
During Dark Crisis, Hal Jordan returns to Earth and is shocked to see Earth in chaos due to the "death" of the Justice League. He encounters a grown up Jonathan Samuel Kent, as well as Wally West. He learns from Black Adam that Pariah has teamed up with The Great Darkness and corrupted multiple cosmic villains to take down the Justice League and Justice League Incarnate. Hal Jordan tells Wally West to go find Barry Allen while he goes find where Pariah is. Hal Jordan meets up with the rest of the Green Lantern Corps, rescues Kyle Rayner from his prison, and formally introduces Kyle to Simon Baz, Sojourner Mullein, and Jessica Cruz. Hal Jordan, Sojourner, and Kyle go confront Pariah, where Hal Jordan realizes that Pariah has trapped the Justice League into fantasy worlds where it will turn into weapons.

Hal Jordan is trapped in a world where he is attacked by a samurai Lantern version of Kyle Rayner, but is saved by Barry Allen. They decide to travel to the Justice League prisons to free everyone. They all confront Pariah, but Pariah vanishes to destroy Earth-Prime. Hal Jordan and Barry Allen create a plan where he will use his power Ring to connect the rest of the Justice League back home while Barry Allen will use his connection of the Multiversal vibrations to navigate. They manage to arrive back home to confront a possessed Deathstroke and his army Black Adam uses his powers to empower the rest of the Justice League to defeat Deathstroke's army, and Hal Jordan tells Barry he will stay on Earth for a while in order to be more grounded. They watch how the new heroes rebuild the Hall of Justice and are impressed by their bravery, and Hal Jordan goes out to hang with his Green Lantern Corps.

==== Dawn of DC ====
During Jeremy Adams' run on Green Lantern, Jordan quits the Green Lantern Corps after the Guardians of the Universe disappear and the United Planets take over the group. This results in Hal losing his power ring, so he gains a new Lantern ring from a Central Oan Battery near The Green's source of power and reconciles his relationship with Carol Ferris. A villain named Starbreaker plans to envelop the entire universe in sorrow by teaming up with Nathan (Carol's ex-boyfriend) and causing the emotional spectrum to enter a state of flux. With the help of Jadestone (a reformed Amazo robot) and John Stewart's sentient ring, Hal, Carol, Sinestro, Kyle, John, and Kilowog find the avatars of the emotional spectrum are trapped in the Source Wall, and agree to help them on the condition they never contact the Lanterns again.

== Powers and abilities ==
As a Green Lantern, Hal Jordan is semi-invulnerable, capable of projecting hard-light constructions, flight, and utilizing various other abilities through his power ring which are only limited by his imagination and willpower. Jordan, as a Green Lantern, has exceptional willpower.

As Parallax, Hal was one of the most powerful beings in all of the DC Universe. In addition to his normal Green Lantern powers, he was able to manipulate and reconfigure time-space to his will, manipulate reality at a large scale, had vast superhuman strength which he demonstrated by being able to knock out Superman with one punch, a higher sense of awareness and enhanced durability. As Parallax, he was still able to be harmed nearly just as easily as a normal Green Lantern but seemed to be able to endure more physical punishment. While Hal Jordan was Parallax, he was never defeated by physical force; all of his defeats were of a changed mental state during or after the battle, which was usually the result of dealing with his own conscience, and he would just give up, leave the battle, and hide himself.

== Other versions ==
Various alternate universe versions of Hal Jordan have appeared throughout the character's publication history.

=== Absolute Universe ===
In the Absolute Universe, Jordan is a toy salesman who lives in Evergreen, Nevada. He temporarily becomes a Black Hand after killing Abin Sur until he is eventually cured by Jo Mullein. Jordan later manifests the violet light, which represents chaotic action.

=== Amalgam Comics ===
Hal Stark / Iron Lantern, a composite character based on Jordan and Marvel Comics character Iron Man, appears in the Amalgam Comics universe.

=== Elseworlds ===
Hal Jordan has appeared in several Elseworlds stories:The character has also appeared in and been the focus of many Elseworlds titles.

- Hal Jordan appears in JLA: Age of Wonder.
- Hal Jordan appears in DC: The New Frontier.
- Hal Jordan appears in Superman: Red Son as a former POW-turned-leader of the Green Lantern Marine Corps.
- In Green Lantern: Evil's Might, Jordan is a New York City police constable in the late 19th century who is engaged to Carol Ferris.
- In JLA: The Nail, Jordan is the leader of the Justice League in a world where Superman was never found by the Kents.
- In Green Lantern: Earth One, Jordan is an asteroid miner and former astronaut who discovered a Green Lantern ring during an excavation.

=== Flashpoint ===
In the alternate timeline of the Flashpoint event, Hal Jordan was reckless as a flying ace. He along with Carol Ferris was on an F-22 Raptor entering Western Europe territory before the Shark attacks. Hal forces the Shark to crash his jet into Carol's jet, and both of them barely got out of the ejection system. Upon their return to America, Hal was about to fly the jet. However, he witnesses a spaceship crash to Earth and was approached by the ship's survivor, Abin Sur, asking for help. However, Abin Sur is subsequently taken into custody by Cyborg and the government to be questioned about his reasons for being on Earth. Later, when Amazonian invisible planes invade over Coast City, Hal and Carol manage to shoot down the invisible planes and the hydra that they dropped. Later, Hal is recruited by the President of the United States for a mission to use a Green Arrow Industries nuclear weapon to bomb Western Europe. Later, Hal is ready to fly on the F-35 with the Green Arrow nuclear weapon attempting to destroy Western Europe at the end of the Atlantean/Amazon war. During the battles on New Themyscira, Hal possesses the remaining nuclear weapon, but his firing mechanism jams. Hal's only option is to fly through New Themyscira on a suicide attack, causing a process which destroys not only New Themyscira's invisible shield, but Hal with it. Afterwards, Thomas Kalmaku gives Carol a note saying that Hal was afraid to say that he had always loved her. Carol sees the engagement ring that he was going to propose to her.

== In other media ==
=== Television ===
- Hal Jordan / Green Lantern appears in The Superman/Aquaman Hour of Adventure, voiced by Gerald Mohr.
- Hal Jordan / Green Lantern appears in Challenge of the Superfriends, voiced by Michael Rye.
- Hal Jordan appears in Legends of the Superheroes, portrayed by Howard Murphy.
- Hal Jordan / Green Lantern appears in Super Friends, voiced again by Michael Rye.
- Hal Jordan / Green Lantern appears in Super Friends: The Legendary Super Powers Show, voiced again by Michael Rye.
- Hal Jordan / Green Lantern appears in The Super Powers Team: Galactic Guardians, voiced again by Michael Rye.
- Hal Jordan / Green Lantern makes a cameo appearance in the Duck Dodgers episode "The Green Loontern", voiced by Kevin Smith.
- Hal Jordan / Green Lantern makes a cameo appearance in the Justice League Unlimited episode "The Once and Future Thing, Part 2: Time, Warped", voiced by Adam Baldwin. Due to time distortions caused by Chronos, Jordan temporarily replaces John Stewart while retaining his knowledge of the Justice League's mission to stop Chronos.
- Hal Jordan / Green Lantern appears in The Batman, voiced by Dermot Mulroney. This version is a founding member of the Justice League.
- Hal Jordan / Green Lantern appears in Batman: The Brave and the Bold, voiced by Loren Lester.
- Hal Jordan / Green Lantern appears in DC Super Friends: The Joker's Playhouse, voiced by Grant Monigher.
- Hal Jordan / Green Lantern appears in Young Justice, voiced by Dee Bradley Baker. This version is a member of the Justice League.
- Hal Jordan / Green Lantern appears in Green Lantern: The Animated Series, voiced by Josh Keaton. This version is a member of the Green Lantern Corps' Honor Guard and initially a rival to Guy Gardner before later befriending him.
- Hal Jordan / Green Lantern appears in the Mad segment "Does Someone Have to GOa?", voiced by Chris Cox.
- Hal Jordan / Green Lantern appears in DC Super Friends, voiced by Wally Wingert.
- Hal Jordan / Green Lantern appears in Justice League Action, voiced again by Josh Keaton.
- The Green Lantern: The Animated Series incarnation of Hal Jordan / Green Lantern appears in the Teen Titans Go! episode "The Academy" via archival footage.
- Hal Jordan / Green Lantern appears in DC Super Hero Girls (2019), voiced by Jason Spisak. This version is a student at Metropolis High School, ex-boyfriend of Star Sapphire, second-in-command of the "Invinci-Bros", and a stereotypical jock with a strong, charming, and somewhat narcissistic demeanor.
- Hal Jordan / Green Lantern appears in Lanterns, portrayed by Kyle Chandler. This version is a veteran Green Lantern who has operated for over thirty years since 1986, with his identity being public knowledge ten years later in 1996. In flashbacks set in 2016, Jordan is instructed to train John Stewart to become Earth's next Green Lantern. Hal and John come to the small town of Rushville, Nebraska to investigate an alien threat, where they narrowly avert the town's total destruction by Zoe Macon, the galaxy's last surviving Manhunter, after John shoots her. Hal is stripped of his Green Lantern ring, publicly implicated for the carnage, and spends ten years in prison, moving back to Rushville after getting released in an attempt to atone. He falls in love with and begins dating the town's sheriff Kerry Kane, who accidentally kills him during an argument after he learns that her son Noah is also a Manhunter.

=== Film ===
- Hal Jordan / Green Lantern appears in Justice League: The New Frontier, voiced by David Boreanaz.
- Hal Jordan / Green Lantern appears in Green Lantern: First Flight, voiced by Christopher Meloni.
- Hal Jordan / Green Lantern appears in Justice League: Crisis on Two Earths, voiced by Nolan North. This version is a member of the Justice League.
- Hal Jordan / Green Lantern appears in Green Lantern: Emerald Knights, voiced by Nathan Fillion. This version's power ring was originally wielded by Avra, the first Green Lantern to use their ring to create constructs.
- Hal Jordan / Green Lantern appears in a self-titled film, portrayed by Ryan Reynolds.
- Hal Jordan / Green Lantern appears in Justice League: Doom, voiced again by Nathan Fillion.
- Hal Jordan / Green Lantern appears in Lego Batman: The Movie – DC Super Heroes Unite, voiced by Cam Clarke.
- Hal Jordan / Green Lantern appears in Lego DC Comics Super Heroes: Justice League: Attack of the Legion of Doom, voiced again by Josh Keaton.
- Hal Jordan / Green Lantern appears in Lego DC Comics Super Heroes: Justice League: Cosmic Clash, voiced again by Josh Keaton.
- Hal Jordan / Green Lantern appears in The Lego Movie, voiced by Jonah Hill. This version is a Master Builder who Superman is annoyed with.
- Hal Jordan / Green Lantern appears in The Lego Batman Movie, voiced again by Jonah Hill. This version is a member of the Justice League.
- Hal Jordan / Green Lantern makes a non-speaking cameo appearance in Teen Titans Go! To The Movies.
- Hal Jordan / Green Lantern appears in The Lego Movie 2: The Second Part, voiced again by Jonah Hill.
- The Red Son incarnation of Hal Jordan appears in Superman: Red Son, voiced by Sasha Roiz.
- Hal Jordan / Green Lantern appears in Injustice, voiced by Brian T. Delaney.
- Hal Jordan / Green Lantern appears in Teen Titans Go! & DC Super Hero Girls: Mayhem in the Multiverse, voiced by an uncredited Jason Spisak.
- Hal Jordan appears in films set in the Tomorrowverse, voiced again by Nolan North.
  - Jordan as Green Lantern and Parallax appears in Green Lantern: Beware My Power. This version was infected by Sinestro with the Parallax entity, which uses his body in an attempt to gain godhood before Green Arrow kills him.
  - Jordan appears in Justice League: Crisis on Infinite Earths.

==== DC Animated Movie Universe ====
- The Flashpoint incarnation of Hal Jordan appears in Justice League: The Flashpoint Paradox, voiced again by Nathan Fillion. In this version of events, he is chosen by the U.S. government to fly Abin Sur's spacecraft and bomb the Atlantean fleet amidst their war with the Amazons. However, he is eaten by a sea monster before he can do so.
- Hal Jordan / Green Lantern appears in Justice League: War, voiced by Justin Kirk. This version is a founding member of the Justice League.
- Hal Jordan / Green Lantern appears in Justice League: Throne of Atlantis, voiced again by Nathan Fillion.
- Hal Jordan / Green Lantern appears in The Death of Superman, voiced again by Nathan Fillion.
- Hal Jordan / Green Lantern appears in Reign of the Supermen, voiced again by Nathan Fillion.
- Hal Jordan / Green Lantern makes a non-speaking appearance in Justice League Dark: Apokolips War.

=== Video games ===
- Hal Jordan / Green Lantern appears as a playable character in Justice League Heroes, voiced by John Rubinow.
- Hal Jordan / Green Lantern appears as a playable character in Mortal Kombat vs. DC Universe, voiced by Josh Phillips.
- Hal Jordan / Green Lantern appears as a playable character in the Nintendo DS version of Batman: The Brave and the Bold – The Videogame, voiced again by Loren Lester.
- Hal Jordan / Green Lantern appears as a playable character in Green Lantern: Rise of the Manhunters, voiced by Ryan Reynolds.
- Hal Jordan / Green Lantern appears as a playable character in LittleBigPlanet 2, voiced by Joseph May.
- Hal Jordan / Green Lantern appears as a playable character in DC Universe Online, voiced by Aaron Mace.
- Hal Jordan / Green Lantern appears as a playable character in Lego Batman 2: DC Super Heroes, voiced by Cam Clarke.
- Hal Jordan / Green Lantern appears as a playable character in LittleBigPlanet PS Vita, voiced again by Joseph May.
- Hal Jordan / Green Lantern appears as a playable character in Injustice: Gods Among Us, voiced again by Adam Baldwin. This version is a member of the Justice League. Additionally, an alternate universe incarnation of Jordan who supports Superman's Regime and was manipulated by Sinestro into becoming a Yellow Lantern also appears.
- Hal Jordan / Green Lantern appears as a playable character in Infinite Crisis, voiced again by Adam Baldwin.
- Hal Jordan / Green Lantern appears in Lego Batman 3: Beyond Gotham, voiced again by Josh Keaton.
- The Injustice incarnation of Hal Jordan / Green Lantern appears as a playable character in Injustice 2, voiced by Steve Blum. After being rehabilitated by the Guardians of the Universe and re-assuming his Green Lantern powers, he returns to Earth to aid Batman's Insurgency in thwarting Brainiac's attack on Earth despite being hunted by Atrocitus, who seeks to make him a Red Lantern.
- Hal Jordan / Green Lantern appears as a playable character in Lego DC Super-Villains, voiced again by Josh Keaton.

=== Miscellaneous ===
- A hologram of Hal Jordan appears in Legion of Super Heroes in the 31st Century #6.
- The Injustice incarnation of Hal Jordan appears in the Injustice: Gods Among Us prequel comic. While supporting Superman's Regime, Sinestro manipulates Jordan into killing Guy Gardner before converting him into a Yellow Lantern.
- Hal Jordan appears in DC Super Hero Girls (2015), voiced again by Josh Keaton. This version is a student at Super Hero High.
- The Injustice incarnation of Hal Jordan appears in the Injustice 2 prequel comic. While standing trial on Oa for his actions under the Regime, a guilt-ridden Jordan confesses to everything he had done and agrees to be imprisoned and undergo rehabilitation. All throughout, he is haunted by Gardner's spirit and temporarily becomes a Red Lantern to rescue the Green Lantern Corps before breaking free of his red power ring upon learning the Red Lantern Corps recruited Starro. Amidst the Red Lantern Corps' attack on Oa, Jordan reassumes his Green Lantern powers to fend them off.
