= Ion (comics) =

Ion, in comics, may refer to:

- Ion (DC Comics), an entity in the DC Comics universe. It is the embodiment of willpower and empowers the Green Lantern Corps and their power rings. Ion has also had several hosts, who often use its name as an alias:
  - Kyle Rayner, a human member of the Green Lantern Corps
  - Sodam Yat, a Daxamite member of the Green Lantern Corps
- Ion (Marvel Comics), a supervillain in the Marvel Comics universe
- I.O.N, a manga by Arina Tanemura

== See also ==
- Ion (disambiguation)
