= Sinestro Corps War =

2007 DC Comics crossover event

- Cover of Green Lantern: The Sinestro Corps War vol. 1 (2008), hardcover collected edition, art by Ethan Van Sciver
- Publisher: DC Comics
- Publication date: June – December 2007
- Genre: Superhero
Title(s)
Green Lantern: Sinestro Corps Special #1
Green Lantern vol. 4, #21–25
Green Lantern Corps vol. 2, #14–19
Tales of the Sinestro Corps: Parallax #1
Tales of the Sinestro Corps: Cyborg-Superman #1
Tales of the Sinestro Corps: Superman-Prime #1
Tales of the Sinestro Corps: Ion #1
- Main character(s): Hal Jordan; Guy Gardner; John Stewart; Kyle Rayner; Sinestro

Creative team
- Writer(s): Geoff Johns; Dave Gibbons; Peter Tomasi; Ron Marz; Alan Burnett
- Artist(s): Ethan Van Sciver; Ivan Reis
- Penciller: Patrick Gleason
- Inker: Prentis Rollins
- Volume 1 (hardcover): ISBN 1-4012-1650-1
- Volume 2 (hardcover): ISBN 1401218008
- Volume 1 (paperback): ISBN 1401218709
- Volume 2 (paperback): ISBN 1401220363
- Complete edition: ISBN 1401233015
- Tales of the Sinestro Corps (hardcover): ISBN 1401218016
- Tales of the Sinestro Corps (paperback): ISBN 1401223265

"Sinestro Corps War" is an American comic book crossover series published by DC Comics in its Green Lantern and Green Lantern Corps titles. Written by Geoff Johns and Dave Gibbons and drawn by Ivan Reis, Patrick Gleason, and Ethan Van Sciver, the 11-part saga was originally published between June and December 2007. In addition to the main storyline, four supplemental "Tales of the Sinestro Corps" one-shot specials and a Blue Beetle tie-in issue were concurrently released.

The story centers on the Green Lanterns of Earth—Hal Jordan, Kyle Rayner, John Stewart and Guy Gardner—and the rest of the Green Lantern Corps as they fight an interstellar war against the Sinestro Corps, an army led by the former Green Lantern Sinestro who are armed with yellow power rings and seek a universe ruled through fear. A 1986 Alan Moore "Tales of the Green Lantern Corps" story was the thematic basis of the storyline. Many characters were changed, killed off, or re-introduced as a result of the event.

Critical and fan reception to "Sinestro Corps War" was highly positive. Many reviewers ranked it among the top comic books of the year, and the storyline's first issue garnered a 2008 Eisner Award nomination for Best Penciller/Inker or Penciller/Inker Team. The storyline was also a financial success, and several issues underwent multiple printings. "Sinestro Corps War" is the second part of a trilogy in the Green Lantern storyline, preceded by the 2005 miniseries Green Lantern: Rebirth. The conclusion of "Sinestro Corps War" sets up the third and final part of the trilogy, Blackest Night, which was published in 2009.

== Plot ==
Prominent members of the Sinestro Corps, including (clockwise from top left): the Cyborg Superman (Hank Henshaw), Superman-Prime, the Anti-Monitor, Parallax (Kyle Rayner), and Sinestro. Art by Ethan Van Sciver.

Following his defeat in Green Lantern: Rebirth, the events of Green Lantern: Sinestro Corps Special #1 see the supervillain Sinestro retreat to the planet Qward in the Antimatter Universe. There he amasses an army, the Sinestro Corps, that he selects based on their ability to "instill great fear". Each member is armed with a yellow power ring, mirroring the green ones of the Green Lantern Corps. Amongst Sinestro's allies are Parallax and the resurrected Anti-Monitor. The Sinestro Corps then launched an all-out assault against the Green Lantern Corps and the universe itself.

During the assault on Oa, the Sinestro Corps manages to inflict heavy casualties and free Superman-Prime and the Cyborg Superman from their imprisonment. Kyle Rayner is captured and transported to Qward, where Sinestro manages to separate Kyle from the symbiotic entity Ion. This allows Parallax to possess Kyle. In Green Lantern (vol. 4) #21, the heroes Hal Jordan, John Stewart and Guy Gardner attempt to rescue Kyle, but are themselves entrapped, with Hal transported to face Sinestro and his allies. A failed bid to rescue Hal depicted in Green Lantern (vol. 4) #22 sees surviving members of the Green Lantern Corps forced underground and split into two groups. While one group attempts to free Hal only to find themselves ambushed, the other successfully rescues Ion. They then re-unite with their ambushed comrades and together they escape from Qward back to the positive matter universe. Hal, John, and Guy return to Earth to warn the Justice League of the Anti-Monitor's return.

As the Sinestro Corps spreads out to ambush Green Lanterns across the universe, Green Lantern (vol. 4) #23 sees the Guardians decide to rewrite their sacred text, the Book of Oa. They remove a section devoted to a prophecy concerning the "Blackest Night", against the objections of two of their number, Ganthet and Sayd. They then add ten new laws, the first of which authorizes the use of lethal force against the Sinestro Corps, while Ganthet and Sayd are expelled from Oa. As the Green Lanterns gather on Oa in preparation for a Sinestro Corps assault, the Sinestro Corps teleport themselves and their Central Power Battery instead to a new Warworld, their objective revealed to be Earth. Events in Green Lantern Corps (vol. 2) #16 show Hal informing the Green Lantern Corps of Sinestro's plans.

Green Lantern (vol. 4) #24 continues the story, with Green Lanterns and Sinestro Corps members battling across Earth. Hal manages to free Kyle from Parallax before the entity is imprisoned in their power batteries by Ganthet and Sayd. After John and Guy arrive, the former Guardians reveal to them the prophecy of the "Blackest Night", seen in Green Lantern (vol. 4) #25. It foretells five more Corps arising, each based on a different color and emotion. After the five corps are established, a "War of Light" will ensue, in which all the corps are destroyed, leading to the "Blackest Night".

The Guardians arrive on Earth and appoint Sodam Yat to be the new Ion. After a lengthy struggle in New York City, the Sinestro Corps are defeated by the overwhelming numbers against them. One of the Guardians sacrifices himself to send Superman-Prime to an alternate universe, and another, Scar, suffers a major wound at the hands of the Anti-Monitor, while Hal and Kyle subdue and arrest Sinestro in Coast City. It is learned that 440 Green Lanterns were killed during the course of the war.

As seen in Green Lantern (vol. 4) #25, the Guardians decide to establish the second of the new laws into effect allowing the Green Lantern Corps to overpower the Sinestro Corps. After realizing that the "Blackest Night" prophecy will come to pass, Ganthet and Sayd depart after creating a blue power ring with the intention of creating their own corps, based on the spreading of hope to the rest of the universe. The Anti-Monitor's remains, having been blown across the vacuum of space at the battle's climax, land on a dark planet, where they are transformed by an unknown force into a black power battery.

== Origins ==
A page from the 1986 Alan Moore/Kevin O'Neill story Tygers depicting the fall of the Green Lantern Corps. Elements from the story were incorporated into "Sinestro Corps War".

"Sinestro Corps War" was based on concepts introduced by Alan Moore and Kevin O'Neill in the short story "Tygers", published in Tales of the Green Lantern Corps Annual #2 (1986). Writers Geoff Johns and Dave Gibbons incorporated several ideas from Moore's stories into "Sinestro Corps War", including the prophecy of the Blackest Night, Sodam Yat, Ranx the Sentient City and the Children of the White Lobe. Leezle Pon, a minor character only mentioned once in Moore's "Mogo Doesn't Socialize" story from 25 years prior, also makes an appearance in Green Lantern #25.

Work began on "Sinestro Corps War" in September 2006. The structure was fluid, at one point becoming a few issues with two bookends to one longer issue. The title was originally just "Sinestro Corps", but during development the creators added the word "War". Eventually, the structure finalized into a one-shot special for release in June, after which the story would alternate between Green Lantern and Green Lantern Corps until November. After the crossover's initial publishing successes, DC added four Tales of the Sinestro Corps one-shots to the publishing schedule.

Johns and Ethan Van Sciver first announced the crossover during the DC "Big Guns" panel at the 2006 Fan Expo Canada, with Johns calling it "the next level of Rebirth". By January 2007, Johns, Gibbons, and editor Peter Tomasi had planned out most of the storyline. Sterling Gates, whom Johns had met at a convention, was brought in to write a backup story for the Superman-Prime one-shot and co-write Green Lantern/Sinestro Corps Secret Files #1.

The creators called "Sinestro Corps War" "World War II with the entire universe". In a September 2007 interview, Johns compared "Sinestro Corps War" to the Star Wars trilogy, with Green Lantern: Rebirth as A New Hope and "Sinestro Corps War" as The Empire Strikes Back. References to other science fiction stories were made by artist Ivan Reis, who inserted characters such as E.T., ALF and a Predator into large two-page illustrations. The writers also included the sound "EPA" in Green Lantern #25 as a direct reference to a scene in The Simpsons Movie where Comic Book Guy says it is the sound Green Lantern made when Sinestro threw him in a vat of acid.

== Format ==
The main story consisted of 11 parts running through the Green Lantern and Green Lantern Corps books. Expanding upon the overall story are four one-shots labeled Tales of the Sinestro Corps, as well as one tie-in with Blue Beetle #20. Part One, the one-shot Green Lantern: Sinestro Corps Special #1, was released in June 2007. Parts Two through Ten were released between August and December, alternating between Green Lantern #21–25 and Green Lantern Corps #14–18, with an epilogue in Green Lantern #26. The content of Green Lantern Corps #19 was changed to illustrate the battle between Sodam Yat and Superman-Prime in response to the fans' reaction to the story. The conclusion of Green Lantern #25 was delayed by two weeks. After the storyline concluded, Green Lantern/Sinestro Corps Secret Files and Origins #1 was released in December. The issue further explored the back story of the opposing groups and listed every member of the Green Lantern Corps and Sinestro Corps.

Cover to Tales of the Sinestro Corps: Superman-Prime #1, one of four one-shot issues about specific members of the Sinestro Corps. Art by Ethan Van Sciver.

There was much internal discussion at DC about how the storyline would be collected. Eventually DC decided to release two hardcover volumes (a February 2008 release containing the first five parts of the story and a June 2008 release containing the last six issues) and a June 2008 hardcover collecting the tie-in issues and backstories. This follows DC Comics' recent trend of releasing durable hardcover collections initially, followed later by softcovers.

=== Tales of the Sinestro Corps ===
In addition to the main story, DC released four Tales of the Sinestro Corps one-shots in September, October and November 2007. The issues were late additions to the crossover that DC added after the initial successes of "Sinestro Corps War". A hardcover collection of the four issues was released in June 2008. The Tales of the Sinestro Corps one-shots focused on:

- Parallax, written by Ron Marz and illustrated by Adriana Melo and Marlo Alquiza.
- Cyborg Superman, written by Alan Burnett and illustrated by Patrick Blaine and Jay Leisten.
- Superman-Prime (previously solicited as about the Anti-Monitor), written by Geoff Johns and illustrated by Pete Woods. The issue also featured the backup story "Fear is a Baby's Cry" written by Sterling Gates and illustrated by Jerry Ordway.
- Ion, written by Ron Marz and illustrated by Michael Lacomb.

== Story and character changes ==
"Sinestro Corps War" introduced the Sinestro Corps in full after allusions to them throughout the post - One Year Later Green Lantern title. Sinestro received a major thematic overhaul as a result of his leadership of his eponymous Corps, with parallels drawn with Adolf Hitler and Nazi Germany. Green Lantern villains Superboy-Prime (later Superman-Prime), Cyborg Superman, and the Manhunters became members of the Sinestro Corps. The Anti-Monitor also made his first reappearance since his death at the conclusion of Crisis on Infinite Earths in 1985 as the "Guardian" of the Sinestro Corps and later the power source of the Black Lantern Corps. Superboy-Prime was renamed Superman-Prime during the event. Ostensibly to illustrate his coming of age in the story, Geoff Johns cited the ongoing legal dispute over the Superboy name as another reason for the character's new name.

Some changes were also made to the heroes during the course of the storyline. The role of Ion passed from Kyle Rayner to Sodam Yat, making Yat the "strongest Green Lantern in the universe" as a result according to Johns. The Book of Oa was rewritten by the Guardians to institute 10 new laws for the Green Lantern Corps, the first of which authorized lethal force against the Sinestro Corps. The rebirth of Coast City, the process of which had been seen throughout Geoff Johns' run on Green Lantern, as "the City Without Fear" was used to symbolically represent Hal Jordan's journey towards acceptance after his resurrection. The second volume of the story's collection revealed that the original plan was for both John Stewart and Guy Gardner to be possessed by Parallax, with artwork of them facing off against Hal Jordan. However, in the midst of the story planning, Johns realized this would make Parallax's possession of Kyle less effective and the segment was dropped and redrawn.

Green Lantern #25 expanded on the "emotional spectrum" concept and introduced five new color-based corps of similar structure to the Green Lanterns and the Sinestro Corps. These corps each draw from different emotions, corresponding with the seven colors of the rainbow (red for rage, orange for avarice, yellow for fear, green for willpower, blue for hope, indigo for compassion and violet for love). Ganthet and Sayd, two Guardians of the Universe who were exiled during the course of the war, were shown as developing the corps that corresponds to the color blue and the emotion hope, while the Anti-Monitor becomes the power source for an eighth color-based corps, the "Black Lanterns", who represent death and the "absence of human drives and emotions". The issue also laid the foundations for the 2009 event Blackest Night, something the creators had been working towards since early 2007.

== Critical and financial reception ==
Altogether, "Sinestro Corps War" turned Green Lantern into one of DC Comics' most profitable titles. Green Lantern: Sinestro Corps Special #1, first released in June 2007, sold out in a single day. DC later reprinted the issue four times, each time with new variant covers by Van Sciver. By August, the issue had sold over 89,000 copies, 36% of which was the result of an unusually high number of reorders. The first four parts of the storyline, Green Lantern #21 and 22, and Green Lantern Corps #14 and 15, were released in July and August and also sold out. The issues went to a second printing, with Green Lantern Corps #14 going to a third printing. Green Lantern #23 and Tales of the Sinestro Corps: Parallax #1 later went on to second printings as well. Blue Beetle #20 saw much higher sales than usual for the title as a result of its tie-in to "Sinestro Corps War", with sales 75% higher than in the previous month.

Critical reception to "Sinestro Corps War" was highly positive. IGN.com called the story a "smash hit" and Newsarama referred to it as both an "action-packed DC adventure" and "DC's blockbuster event of the year". Comic Book Resources released an editorial in mid-October 2007 entitled "Sinestro Corps War is what World War Hulk SHOULD be", citing the former's ability to keep up and gain momentum throughout despite being both twice as large and far less publicized than the latter. Comic Book Resources placed "Sinestro Corps War" on its "Best of 2007" list, and named Geoff Johns one of its "Best Writers of 2007". In 2008, Ethan Van Sciver earned an Eisner Award nomination for his art in Green Lantern: Sinestro Corps Special #1.

DC Comics Executive Editor Dan DiDio praised the storyline as "the best thing that [DC Comics] put out this year. Without a doubt", and called "Sinestro Corps War" the model for crossovers in 2008 and beyond, including "Final Crisis".Didio has also stated that he would like to see a direct-to-video animated "Sinestro Corps War" film similar to Justice League: The New Frontier. Geoff Johns suggested elements of "Sinestro Corps War" to appear in DC Universe Online, on which he was collaborating with artist Jim Lee, although the comic storyline wasn't incorporated in the game.

== Collected editions ==
The main story was first collected in two volumes, but was later collected in a single volume. Miscellaneous stories were collected in an additional volume:

- Green Lantern: The Sinestro Corps War (336 pages, paperback, September 2011, ISBN 1-4012-3301-5)
  - Green Lantern: The Sinestro Corps War Volume One (collects Green Lantern vol. 4 #21–23, Green Lantern Corps vol. 2 #14–15, and a story from Green Lantern: Sinestro Corps Special #1; 176 pages, hardcover, February 2008, ISBN 1-4012-1650-1; softcover, May 2009, ISBN 1-4012-1870-9)
  - Green Lantern: The Sinestro Corps War Volume Two (collects Green Lantern vol. 4 #24–25 and Green Lantern Corps vol. 2 #16–19, 192 pages, hardcover, July 2008, ISBN 1-4012-1800-8; paperback, June 2009, ISBN 1-4012-2036-3)
- Green Lantern: Tales of the Sinestro Corps (collects Tales of the Sinestro Corps: Parallax #1, Tales of the Sinestro Corps: Cyborg-Superman #1, Tales of the Sinestro Corps: Superman-Prime #1, Tales of the Sinestro Corps: Ion #1, Green Lantern/Sinestro Corps Secret Files #1, and stories from Green Lantern: Sinestro Corps Special #1 and Green Lantern vol. 4 #18–20; 200 pages, hardcover, July 2008, ISBN 1-4012-1801-6; paperback, June 2009, ISBN 1-4012-2326-5)

== In other media ==
- In an interview with Newsarama in 2008, DC Comics executive editor Dan DiDio expressed interest in making an animated adaptation of Sinestro Corps War as part of the DC Universe Animated Original Movies.
- During the early development of the cancelled Green Lantern sequel in 2012, the main plot was based on the Sinestro Corps War storyline.
