= Kyle Rayner =

DC Comics superhero

- Kyle Rayner as Green Lantern, as depicted in Green Lantern Gallery #1 (December 1996). Art by Darryl Banks, Kevin Nowlan (inker), and Matt Hollingsworth (colorist)

Publication information
- Publisher: DC Comics
- First appearance: As Kyle Rayner: Green Lantern (vol. 3) #48 (January 1994); As Green Lantern: Green Lantern (vol. 3) #50 (March 1994)
- Created by: Ron Marz; Darryl Banks

In-story information
- Full name: Kyle Rayner
- Species: Human
- Team affiliations: Green Lantern Corps; Justice League; New Titans; New Guardians; Omega Men
- Partnerships: Green Lantern partners: Hal Jordan; Guy Gardner; John Stewart; Jade; Kilowog; Other hero partners: Connor Hawke / Green Arrow; Wally West / The Flash; Donna Troy; Soranik Natu
- Notable aliases: Emerald Knight; Green Lantern; White Lantern; Ion; Oblivion; Life-Equation; Jade Dragon; Torchbearer; Parallax; Omega Lantern
- Abilities: Skilled and creative artist; Use of power ring grants: Flight; Force-field generation; Generation of hard-light constructs; Energy blasts; Real-time translation of all languages; Enhanced strength, speed, and durability; Space travel; Limited cellular regeneration; Red Lantern energy grants: Blood absorption; Napalm plasma breath; Rage infection; Orange Lantern energy grants: Energy siphoning; Soul manipulation; Yellow Lantern energy grants: Fear empowerment and manipulation; Blue Lantern energy grants: Regenerative healing; Possession nullification; Emotional purification; Rage nullification; Indigo Lantern energy grants: Portal creation; Empathy manipulation; Sapphire Lantern energy grants: Crystal creation; Mind control; As White Lantern: Control over life; Possession of all Lantern abilities; Resurrection; Clairvoyance; Astral communication

Kyle Rayner (/ˈreɪnər/), one of the characters known as Green Lantern, is a superhero appearing in American comic books published by DC Comics. The character is depicted as being associated with the Green Lantern Corps, an extraterrestrial police force of which he has been a member.

Rayner has been adapted into various media outside comics, including animated series and video games. He has been voiced by Michael P. Greco, Will Friedle, Josh Keaton, and John Rubinow.

== Publication history ==
Created by writer Ron Marz and artist Darryl Banks, and named after a character from James Cameron's film The Terminator, Kyle Rayner first appeared in Green Lantern vol. 3, #48 (1994), as part of the "Emerald Twilight" storyline, in which DC Comics replaced Green Lantern Hal Jordan with Rayner; he was the sole Green Lantern throughout the late 1990s and into the mid-2000s in a very successful run that rejuvenated the Green Lantern franchise. He served as a member of the JLA, where he was one of the brightest stars. During the later end of this period he was also briefly known as Ion.

Following Jordan's return to Green Lantern status in the 2004–2005 limited series Green Lantern: Rebirth, and the 2005 crossover storyline "Infinite Crisis", Kyle returned to his alias of Ion. After the events of the "Sinestro Corps War", Kyle returned to his original role as a Green Lantern officer, along with a promotion to Honor Guard Illustres of the Corps. Later on, he becomes a White Lantern following the mastery of all seven lantern rings. After DC Rebirth, Kyle again returns as Green Lantern, along with his original Corps uniform.

== Fictional character biography ==
=== The last Green Lantern ===
Kyle Rayner's debut as Green Lantern. Cover of Green Lantern vol. 3 #51 (March 1994). Art by Darryl Banks.

Before he acquired a Green Lantern power ring, Kyle Rayner was a struggling-but-gifted freelance comic book artist who was raised in North Hollywood and lived and worked in Los Angeles. Kyle was raised by his Irish mother as an only child; his father abandoned his mother when she was pregnant. It was later revealed that his father was a Mexican-American CIA agent named Gabriel Vasquez and that Aaron Rayner was merely an alias and that he had once met Hal Jordan shortly after the pilot became Green Lantern. Kyle and his mother lived a modest lifestyle until he reached adulthood. After Jordan, grief-stricken over the destruction of his home of Coast City by Mongul, went on a mad rampage killing various members of the Green Lantern Corps and Guardians of the Universe, Ganthet gave Kyle the last working Green Lantern power ring. His reasons for doing so have never been made completely apparent, aside from Kyle having been in the right place at the right time: prior to bequeathing the ring, Ganthet simply utters, "You will have to do." Ganthet later revealed that humans make great Green Lanterns (before Hal Jordan's mental breakdown he was the Corps' greatest Green Lantern, and John Stewart became the first mortal Guardian of the Universe). Several sources, however, imply that Ganthet was following a deeper reason: Kyle was not chosen because he was fearless but because he was able to feel and overcome fear, thus making him, and all the future Lanterns, less susceptible to Parallax's influence. The New Guardians retelling goes so far as to replace the scowling "You will have to do" with a smiling "It would seem I chose well."

At first, Kyle took possession of the ring very lightly. His girlfriend, Alexandra DeWitt, encouraged him to be more responsible, create his own version of the Green Lantern uniform, and helped him train for his new role as a superhero, but she was later murdered and stuffed in a refrigerator by the supervillain Major Force. The guilt over this event drove Kyle to take his role more seriously, and as a result, he strove to be the best Green Lantern he could be in honor of Alex's memory. Kyle then moved to New York City, since Los Angeles reminded him of Alex and he needed a fresh start.

Kyle grew up enamored with Superman and Batman, though he had only a passing knowledge of Earth's various Green Lanterns. This soon changed, and he found that the Green Lantern ring was the ultimate expression of his fertile imagination. While in battle, he often used the ring's power to create constructs of just about anything his artistic mind could imagine: other superheroes, anime characters, mystical characters, mechas, futuristic weapons, and original characters from his comic books. While other members of the Green Lantern Corps questioned the practicality of those constructs, they often made Kyle an unpredictable and formidable opponent.

=== Justice League ===
After relocating to New York City, Kyle joined the superhero group the Titans for a brief time, during which he dated Donna Troy, but eventually became a member of the Justice League (JLA). He initially clashed with the Flash (Wally West) early in his career. West had worked with Jordan since childhood and had reservations about Kyle as the new Green Lantern, but he eventually became one of Kyle's best friends and biggest supporters. Surprisingly, another of Kyle's biggest supporters amongst the League was Batman, who often treated him with more respect than he showed certain other League members (including his predecessors as Green Lantern—Jordan, Gardner, and Stewart), most likely due to the fact that Kyle was willing to learn from others where other Lanterns focused on their rings and pre-existing skills. Kyle also entered a romantic relationship with Jade and formed friendships with the Golden Age Green Lantern (Jade's father, Alan Scott), Green Arrow (Connor Hawke), Arsenal (Roy Harper), Warrior (Guy Gardner), and John Stewart (who at the time was a former Green Lantern).

During his superhero career, Kyle accumulated a rogues gallery that included characters from his predecessors' pasts such as Doctor Polaris and Doctor Light.

=== Oblivion ===
Oblivion, the sinister embodiment of Kyle Rayner's psyche. From Green Lantern: Circle of Fire #2 (October 2000). Art by Robert Teranishi.

During the fifth-week event "Circle of Fire", it is discovered that a cosmic entity named Oblivion is coming to Earth after he attacked the planet Rann. This shocked Kyle because the villain is identical to the character of a story Kyle made when he was seven during his period of struggling with his fear and anger of growing up without a father. The Justice League tries to stop Oblivion, and during the battle, Kyle is sent back to Earth to get reinforcements, but the League is captured. On Earth, Kyle recruits Power Girl, Atom, Firestorm, Adam Strange, and the Circle of Fire — a group of Green Lanterns from alternate realities and different time periods. The Circle of Fire consists of Kyle's late girlfriend Alexandra DeWitt from an alternate timeline where she had received the power ring instead of Kyle; Hunter and Forest Rayner, cousins descended from Kyle who share one power ring; Ali Rayner-West, Green Lightning, a future descendant of Wally West and Kyle who possesses both the Flash and Green Lantern's powers but could only use one of those powers at a time; a reprogrammed Manhunter robot model G.L.7177.6; and Pel Tavin, the Emerald Knight, a Daxamite Green Lantern from the Middle Ages.

Finding himself in a role as a leader, Kyle split this group up to handle different crises caused by Oblivion, or in some cases to search for a way to defeat him. Eventually, in a confrontation, Oblivion reveals that he is a distillation of Kyle's doubts and darker impulses, made manifest through the power of the ring. The villain also reveals that Kyle has subconsciously created the Circle of Fire based on his positive aspects because he needed help; Alex is an embodiment of Kyle's capability for love, while Tavin represents his bravery, Ali represents hope, G.L.7177.6 represents logic, and Hunter and Forest represent his imagination. When they realize this, they decide that the created Green Lanterns should return to Kyle's mind. Doing so allows him to unlock more powers from the ring that had been previously unavailable to him and also discovers an inner strength he never knew he possesses after his positive aspects return to him. Facing up to this, Kyle is able to defeat Oblivion in New York City, imprison the entity within his own mind, and free the Justice League.

=== Ion ===
Kyle Rayner as Ion, from Green Lantern (vol. 3) #145 (February 2002). Art by Dale Eaglesham.

For a brief period, Kyle achieved godhood as Ion after absorbing the energy Hal Jordan had left in Earth's Sun during "The Final Night" storyline, which had merged and grown with energies released after Oblivion's defeat. With his new powers, Kyle could bend time, space, and reality, allowing himself, for a good example, to be in many places at once. The drawback of being one with everything was that Kyle could no longer sleep or separate himself from the overwhelming responsibilities these abilities imposed upon him. Rather than sacrifice his humanity, Kyle abandoned omnipotence, bleeding off the vast power, recharging the Central Power Battery on the Guardians' home planet and headquarters, Oa, and helping to create a new group of Guardians in the process. Before he purged all of the power, though, he modified his ring and conjured a new Corps uniform to reflect his new maturity. Once again limited only by his willpower and imagination, Kyle's ring could still affect yellow and would always harbor a lifeline of power without a time limit on its power, is keyed directly to him, and would always return to him, though it still required charging to reach full power.

After the brutal gay bashing of his young assistant and friend Terry Berg, Kyle went on a lengthy self-imposed exile into space. Before leaving, Kyle selected John Stewart to replace him in the Justice League. Upon his return, he discovered that Jade had begun seeing someone new and was doing so in his own apartment. He left New York and spent some time trying once again to find his place on Earth and ended up staying with his mother for a brief time.

=== Green Lantern: Rebirth ===
After being tricked into believing his mother had been murdered by Major Force, Kyle fights with the villain, eventually dealing with the immortal by decapitating him and shooting his head into space. Feeling that he is a danger to those he cares for, Kyle once again leaves for the far reaches of space. During the events of the miniseries Green Lantern: Rebirth, he returns with Jordan's corpse and the discovery of the true nature of Parallax, which is revealed to actually be an alien parasitic entity, the non-corporeal embodiment of fear, that possessed Jordan and committed crimes in his name. Subsequent to this, Kyle is given special status amongst the Guardians, who consider him the "Torchbearer", the Green Lantern who carried the legacy through the Corps' darkest period.

=== Infinite Crisis and the return of Ion ===
In Infinite Crisis, Alexander Luthor Jr. reveals that had the Multiverse continued to exist without Crisis on Infinite Earths occurring, Kyle would have been a native of Earth-Eight. When Jade dies during the Rann–Thanagar War, she transfers her power to Kyle, catalyzing his transformation into Ion.

In the series Ion: Guardian of the Universe, Ion seemingly destroys a fleet of starships and violently attacks two Green Lanterns, but Kyle has no memory of the destruction and only learns of his possible role in it after being attacked by a bounty hunter. Upon visiting the fleet's wreckage, Kyle loses control and finds himself near the sentient planet Mogo, also a Green Lantern, who uses his Lantern abilities to help convalescing Lanterns gain insight into their problems through the use of constructs conjured by the Lantern's own subconscious. On Mogo, Kyle converses with images of Alex, Donna, and Jade and fights Major Force. Kyle realizes that as Ion, he is able to channel the green energy of both the Starheart and the Central Power Battery. This new energy is called the "Ion Power".

Later, Jordan finds Ion destroying a planet but discovers that this is in fact Alexander Nero, who claims that his connection with Kyle and new powers are the result of a third party's interference. Jordan and Kyle then discover that the Guardians had placed Kyle through these events as a test of whether he could handle his power, in anticipation of their granting him an honored position among Green Lanterns as their Torchbearer, now that he harbors the ability to revive the Corps should it ever be destroyed again. They explain that he will not patrol a sector as other Lanterns do but will be called upon for aid in situations that the Corps cannot handle alone. They also reveal that some unforeseen enemy manipulated Nero, who unleashes a massive amount of energy that Kyle dissipates into what is presumed to be a pocket universe. Kyle later learns that he was hunted by enemies such as Effigy, who was subliminally instructed to attack Kyle by Nero. After clearing his reputation on the planet that was scorched by Nero while using Kyle's identity, Kyle learns his mother is dying of an unknown cause. After being attacked by the Tangent Comics version of the Atom and the Flash, and being transported to the interdimensional realm known as the "Bleed", where he encounters Captain Atom, he returns home to attempt to reanimate his mother, but after a tearful farewell, she declines resurrection.

=== Sinestro Corps War ===
Sinestro abducts Kyle from Oa through one of his new yellow power rings. At the Sinestro Corps' base on Qward, he reveals to Kyle that he was responsible for his mother's death and infected her with the sentient virus Despotellis to kill her in a plot to break Kyle's will so that he could serve as Parallax's new host. Sinestro also reveals that Ion is an energy entity that thrives on willpower and that Kyle is its current host.

The Sinestro Corps confront Kyle, who has his powers drained out of him by Sinestro himself and is immediately taken over by Parallax. Parallax then clothes itself in a new uniform, which appears as a combination of the Sinestro Corps' uniform, Kyle's original Green Lantern costume, and the armor Hal Jordan wore as Parallax. Parallax's possession also turns the hair on top of Kyle's head gray, just as it turned the hair on Hal Jordan's temples. Parallax returns to Qward with the Sinestro Corps and is inducted into their ranks, becoming one of the Anti-Monitor's heralds.

In Kyle's body, Parallax captured Hal Jordan, Guy Gardner, and John Stewart and brought them to Qward. Before bringing them, Parallax made Hal relive the only time he ever experienced fear: when his father died. Parallax also elaborated that since invading Kyle's mind, he now has nearly infinite creativity to call upon in his deeds. During the battle with the Green Lantern Corps, who arrive at Qward to rescue the captured Lanterns, Parallax murders Jack T. Chance and crushes his Power Ring before it can find a replacement. During his fight with the Earth Green Lanterns, Parallax revealed that Kyle's "twisted desire" was to be the last Green Lantern again and thus "special". He is stopped from murdering Guy Gardner by the intervention of the surviving Lost Lanterns and the Ion entity. Parallax then led an advance group of the Sinestro Corps, readying to attack Coast City. It is also suggested by the Guardians of the Universe that Kyle is no longer destined to be Ion following his being taken over by Parallax.

As seen in the one-shot Parallax (September 2007) Kyle was trapped within his own mind. He is able to witness all that Parallax says and does from a third-person perspective but is unable to stop it. Kyle's personality watches Parallax's actions from inside the prison that his own imagination has constructed: his mother's empty house. The only fixture in the house is an old painting of uncertain origin and authorship that had belonged to Kyle's mother. As Kyle watches Parallax battle Hal Jordan and the Lost Lanterns a manifestation of the fear entity comes to pay him a visit. In the realm of his imagination, Kyle is able to "transform" into Ion and engage the parasite in battle. After being blasted back by Parallax and losing his Ion form, Kyle forms a power ring, places it on his finger, and appears in his original costume. Although he puts up a valiant fight, Parallax is too much for him, and Kyle is defeated. Parallax taunts Kyle with his deepest fear: failing the people who depend on him, especially the women in his life. Many of the women in Kyle's life have died or come to harm because of their association with him, and this causes Kyle to struggle with feelings of guilt and responsibility. Parallax mocks Kyle's helplessness and turns to depart, but Kyle grabs a pencil and stabs Parallax in the eye with it. Parallax, unfazed and unhurt, taunts Kyle once more with the hopelessness of his position and disappears. Left alone, Kyle is about to smash the painting in frustration when he notices his mother's signature in the bottom corner and realizes that she secretly painted it years ago. This connection with his mother gives Kyle hope, the thing he needs to overcome his fear. With renewed faith in himself, Kyle walks into the painting and ends up in a field walking toward a bright, green star.

=== Green Lantern again ===
After threatening Hal's brother and family in Coast City, Parallax is confronted by Hal Jordan, who is enraged by the entity's attempt to take James Jordan's life as well as possession of Kyle. Surprisingly, Jordan manages to beat Parallax consistently in fury but loses the charge in his ring before he can defeat him completely. While visibly weakened, Jordan becomes absorbed by Parallax in addition to Kyle, and Parallax takes a new physical form with a bright yellow costume, a sign that he is a creature capable of inducing great fear.

Meanwhile, John Stewart orders Guy Gardner to retrieve the painting of a little boy in a field, which was hanging in Kyle's mother's house. As Guy returns and shows the painting to Parallax, it visibly shifts his demeanor. Jordan, the beacon of green light that had come to Kyle inside his mind, assists Kyle in fighting Parallax exhaustively until they finally break free from the fear embodiment's grip.

Just as the now-separated Parallax counterattacks the Lanterns, ousted Guardians Ganthet and Sayd arrive with four Lantern Power Batteries, and they proceed to entrap Parallax within them all. Ganthet explains that his final act as a Guardian is to give Kyle his power ring. The Guardian asks Kyle if he is willing to downgrade himself to a regulation Green Lantern after serving as Ion's host for so long. Kyle quickly agrees, and the four officers then take their batteries, recite the oath, and recharge their rings.

The four Green Lanterns then split in two directions; Hal returns to Coast City to prevent it from being destroyed again with Kyle by his side, and John and Guy head to New York City to battle the Anti-Monitor, Superboy-Prime, and Cyborg Superman. As Hal and Kyle battle Sinestro, Sinestro momentarily gains the upper hand after one of the Manhunters absorbs their power ring's energies. After the Green Lantern Corps defeat the Cyborg Superman, the Manhunters immediately deactivate, with Hal able to take one of the robots' skulls to absorb Sinestro's power. With three of them powerless, Hal and Kyle immediately engage Sinestro in combat, with the two Lanterns emerging victorious.

After the war, he is assigned to the Honor Guard as Guy Gardner's partner and sent to counsel Sodam Yat, the new Ion. Kyle and Guy decide to move to Oa, giving them better access to performing their duties. Kyle places his mother's painting on the wall of his new Oan apartment. The Ion is now stated as unrelated to the Starheart Power given to him by Jade: Such sudden spike in powers enabled the Guardians to temporarily bond the Ion entity with Kyle. With the loss of the Ion entity, Kyle again has the powers and abilities of a standard Green Lantern.

Since his promotion to Honor Guard, Kyle has acted as a troubleshooter for the Corps, participating in actions such as the defeat of Sinestro Corps member Mongul and the capture of Sinestro Corps member Kryb. Additionally, he and Lantern Soranik Natu began a romantic relationship.

=== Countdown and beyond ===
Kyle Rayner as he appears after the Sinestro Corps War and during Countdown to Final Crisis. Art by Talent Caldwell and J.D.Smith.

In Countdown, Weeks 49-47, Kyle Rayner is among those "anomalies" listed by the Monitors as being dangerous to the Universe, so he is on their list for termination. Also on the list are Duela Dent, Donna Troy, and Jason Todd.

Kyle briefly appears in All-New Atom #15, once again carrying a Green Lantern ring. He makes it clear that he is no longer Ion, stating that he "[has] to change [his] business cards". Kyle joins Donna Troy, Jason Todd, Bob the Monitor, and the Jokester in the Countdown Presents the Search for Ray Palmer. This story takes place after the events of the "Sinestro Corps War", though it was started while the war was still ongoing in the Green Lantern and Green Lantern Corps series. Kyle's new uniform is an amalgamation of his previous Lantern uniforms and elements of the traditional version, as well as his original mask.

When the challengers finally locate Ray Palmer (on Earth-51) Bob attacks him, revealing his acts of assistance to be a ruse. Kyle escapes with Ray, who reveals that it was the deceased Earth-51 Ray Palmer who was meant to stop the great disaster, not him. The two are then attacked by Power Ring and evil versions of Booster Gold and Supergirl. While the battle between Monarch and Superboy-Prime rages, the hand of the Source urges the Challengers to go to Apokolips. With the help of Earth-51's Monitor, Nix Uotan, the group manages to leave before Superboy-Prime tears open Monarch's armor, obliterating that entire universe.

After Darkseid's defeat, Kyle joins Donna, Ray, and Forager in becoming border guards to the Multiverse.

=== Blackest Night ===
Continuing his duties as a Green Lantern Honor Guard member, Kyle moves to Oa, running a new version of the Warriors Bar with Guy Gardner and continuing his relationship with Soranik Natu, secretly breaking a law in the Book of Oa that forbids relationships between Lanterns. He had been involved in the lead-up to "Blackest Night", being one of the first to deal with a new Star Sapphires member, and fought on Oa after the Guardian Scar caused a mass prison break of Sinestro Corpsmen.

After the prison break, the Alpha Lanterns are ordered to execute all Sinestro Corps members and all other prisoners. Kyle and Guy oppose this, cautioning the Alphas and the Guardians to avoid the dark path to which such actions would lead, but the Guardians ignored this, reassigning Kyle and Guy to Earth. After briefly returning to Earth, the two Lanterns return to Oa, encountering an immense swarm of black rings. The rings resurrect all the deceased Lanterns in Oa's crypts, including Jade. Having learned that these Black Lanterns are not truly the deceased persons they once were but grotesque mockeries, Kyle tries to destroy them, but Jade torments Kyle with images of people he has failed in the past. The false Jade is destroyed by Natu.

During the Black Lanterns' attack on the Central Power Battery, Alpha Lantern Chaselon's internal power battery is breached. Kyle sacrifices himself by grabbing the battery and using it to destroy as many Black Lanterns as he can. Soon afterward, Kyle is resurrected by Miri Riam of the Star Sapphires. Journeying to Earth, Kyle battles a Black Lantern version of Alexandra DeWitt and helps defeat the Black Lantern Corps leader, Nekron. In the aftermath, some of the Black Lanterns are restored to life, including Jade.

=== War of the Green Lanterns ===
When the rogue Guardian Krona attacks Oa, he places Parallax back inside the Central Power Battery, enabling him to control the Green Lanterns through fear. Due to his past experiences with Parallax, Kyle is able to resist the effects but is forced to remove his ring to prevent himself from losing control. Tasked by Ganthet to flee, Kyle and John Stewart make their way into Oa's underground. While there, they encounter Guy and Hal, who has the rings of the other Corps leaders. Kyle, taking Ganthet's earlier declaration that he was putting his "hopes" in him to heart, chooses Saint Walker's ring, while Hal chooses Sinestro's, Guy chooses Atrocitus's, and John chooses Indigo-1's. However, the blue ring has the effect of supercharging the attacking Green Lanterns' rings, severely impeding the Earthmen's defense. While Hal and Guy go to remove Parallax from the Central Power Battery, Kyle and John attempt to free Mogo from Krona's control. On the way, Kyle discovers the blue ring's ability to show a person their greatest hope can free the Lanterns from Krona's control. Unfortunately, it does not work on Mogo, due to the residual Black Lantern energy in his core. Kyle watches as John absorbs the Black Lantern energy, along with all the Green Lantern energy, and uses it to destroy Mogo. In the fallout, the two regroup with Hal, Guy, and Ganthet, using the full power of the emotional spectrum to crack open the Battery and release Parallax. Their job done, the Lanterns regain their original green rings, in preparation for the final confrontation with Krona. In the final battle, Hal takes Kyle to the Book of the Black and makes him draw a picture of Sinestro, Carol Ferris, and the others Lanterns trapped in the Book, which effectively frees them from their prison.

In the aftermath of the war, Kyle and Soranik are forced to deal with their relationship issues. Kyle talks with Tomar-Tu about his problems with Soranik, but they, along with Soranik, are teleported into an alien world ravaged by Miri Riam. The Lanterns subdue Miri, who reveals to them that she did not kill anyone on the planet and she only damaged property to force Kyle and Soranik to reunite and solve their problems, reminding them of the time when she used her crystal to reveal to them their respective true loves. However, Kyle reveals that when Miri showed him his true love, he saw Jade, not Soranik. He justified himself saying that although Jade was the love of his life, she was dead and he needed to move on. Angered, Soranik breaks up with Kyle, telling him not to enter her sector.

=== The New 52 ===
Kyle Rayner as a White Lantern. Art by Ethan Van Sciver.

Over time, Kyle attracts one ring from each Corps group. Despite some initial success, Kyle's body is eventually unable to keep up the strain of wielding all of his new rings, with five of the new rings destroyed after a few moments, leaving just the orange ring along with his green ring. Ganthet attempts to remove Kyle's green ring and dismiss him from the Corps, but the ring itself reacts violently to this attempt to remove it. The orange ring is revealed to be a construct of Glomulus, who asks Kyle for help, with the other ring-bearers arriving to either assist or attack Kyle. When the Guardians forcefully strike down the lanterns save for Glomulus, Larfleeze appears and attacks the Guardians. Accompanied by Sayd, Larfleeze attacks the Guardians, but when Kyle hears Sayd imply that there is a way to restore Ganthet to normal, he joins forces with the other ring-wielders and flees the Guardians, essentially resigning from the Corps while retaining his ring. Talking with Larfleeze, they learn that the rings were drawn to Kyle due to the actions of a mysterious spaceship that has just entered this universe. Larfleeze sent Glomulus to investigate it since he was able to resist the "compulsion" of the source that tried to remove his ring due to his prolonged contact with it, and the new team resolved to investigate this new threat. When they are attacked by the Archangel Invictus, who claims that all who wield the rings are evil, Kyle sends out a message to the other ring-wielders by convincing his ring to tap into his own emotions of hope, fear, and compassion to "tune in" to the appropriate "wavelength". Learning of Invictus's history with Larfleeze, Kyle is able to trick him into letting the ring-bearers go by claiming that they will kill Larfleeze for him. With his ring low on power, Kyle returns to Earth with Bleez to recharge his ring, Bleez suggesting that Kyle will need protection from the Guardians after his expulsion while retaining his ring. Although he fails to reach the Blue Lanterns in time to save them from the invading Reach, Kyle is able to lead the New Guardians to fight Larfleeze and Invictus, subsequently learning that Sayd was responsible for turning him into a "ring magnet" in the hope that he would be able to bring the seven Corps together to save Ganthet, as both the only person who loved Ganthet as much as her and the only person able to wield all the powers of the emotional spectrum. Despite learning the truth about their origins, the New Guardians split up since they feel that the circumstances of their origin have tainted the team from the beginning regardless of Sayd's motives.

=== Rise of the Third Army ===
Attempting to track down Hal, Kyle meets Carol Ferris as they witness a news report about Hal and Sinestro's fight with Black Hand, prompting Carol to re-don her Sapphire ring to help Kyle battle the Black Lanterns, only to find nothing but "conventional" zombies. Although Kyle's ring states that Hal was apparently dead, Carol rejects this idea as the link between her heart and Hal's, which she is aware of although her ring is still intact. Through a vision from her ring, Carol realizes that Kyle must unite the powers of all seven Corps to stop this threat, despite Kyle's uncertainty about his ability to channel the powers of rage or avarice even if he has already accessed the powers of hope and fear. Carol is able to contact Atrocitus to help train Kyle to harness the red ring of rage by arguing that Kyle will use that power against the Guardians. He attempts to provoke Kyle's rage by reminding him of the death of his girlfriend Alex after he got the ring, but when this fails, Kyle instead feeling grief rather than anger, he takes Kyle to witness a group of people being threatened and executed in another country, Kyle's anger at this provoking the activation of the red power within him, also turning him disturbingly cold toward the desecration of Alex's grave. Although Arkillo and Larfleeze are able to help him harness the powers of fear and greed, it takes a confrontation with Ganthet to help Kyle harness the power of love since Kyle accepts his refusal to harm Ganthet despite what he has become due to his fatherly regard for Ganthet. With his powers at their peak, Kyle resolves to lead the Guardians in the confrontation against the Third Army.

=== Wrath of the First Lantern ===
When the villainous First Lantern is freed, he drains the Lantern Corps of their emotions, minds, and memories of the various beings present with the intention of seeing how their life choices had changed them. Kyle failed to fight off the First Lantern, which also has the powers of the white light and drains his emotions. The First Lantern teleports him back to his old home, leaving him weak. Later, Carol locates Kyle, who resists from his critical weak state, while Kyle and Carol arrive at Korugar when Sinestro rages to attack them, blaming everyone for his home planet being destroyed. Sinestro demands Kyle revive Korugar with the White Lantern ring's abilities, but Kyle is unable to do so. Sinestro flies off vowing to kill the First Lantern, while Kyle and Carol later team-up with Green Lanterns Simon Baz and B'dg.

In the final battle, Kyle and the reserve Lantern Corps attack the First Lantern, and he is finally destroyed. Afterwards, Kyle travels to Earth and helps other people with the White Lantern's miracle power on his own. However, he is confronted by Saint Walker, who convinces him that he has to visit his own father, considering that Kyle has not seen him since the First Lantern's attack. Later, Kyle arrives in Arizona and reunites with his father in his filling station.

=== Lights Out ===
During the "Lights Out" storyline, Kyle and the emotional entities travel into the Source Wall to restore the emotional spectrum. During this time, he sees the source of the universe and subconsciously creates Oblivion to destroy himself so that he cannot endanger anyone else. However, various other ring-wielders, including Carol and Saint Walker, band together and convince him to have hope, resulting in Kyle working with the Templar Guardians to defeat Oblivion. Recognizing that the white light is too powerful for him to control full-time, Kyle splits his ring between himself and six other allies, allowing the option of the rings recombining into one if Kyle is faced with a serious threat.

=== DC Rebirth ===
Subsequently, in DC Rebirth, Kyle is one of the several individuals who feel the tremors of the green light of willpower when Hal Jordan forges a Green Power Ring for himself. When Hal is left badly wounded and in a realm between life and death after a confrontation with Sinestro, his ring travels to Ganthet and Sayd, who summon Kyle to help save Hal's life. Kyle uses the power of his white ring and the former Guardians' power to open a doorway to Emerald Space in the afterlife, and manages to bring Hal back to the realm of the living. After the new truce between the Sinestro and Green Lantern Corps, Kyle attempts to use his ring to help Saint Walker bring the rest of the Blue Lantern Corps back to life, but some external force prevents Kyle channeling his power to that extent, resulting in him 'downgrading' back to a conventional Green Lantern ring as the strain he had subjected his ring to causes it to 'break up' back into the seven differently-colored rings, with Kyle retaining his original Green Lantern ring while the other six flies off to find new wielders. Kyle begins to initiate another relationship with Soranik. During the fight against the Prism Beasts, Kyle learns from the future Green Power Ring that Rip Hunter possessed, that Sarko is Kyle's and Soranik's future son. After Sarko's death, Kyle is left demoralized and makes him more persistent to bring Soranik back to the Green Lantern Corp. Eventually she finds out about Kyle killing Sarko and falls under the influence of the Yellow Lantern and brands Kyle. She then attacks the Green Lanterns after finding out about one of their own killing a Yellow Lantern and later finds out the Power Battery had a fail-safe that prevents them from using it if they were to turn on them which makes her even more furious and retreats with her Corp.

=== Infinite Frontier ===
In Infinite Frontier, a mysterious force attacks Oa, destroys the Green Lantern central power battery, and scatters the Lanterns across space. Kyle is among the Lanterns who disappear and are considered missing in action.

In Dark Crisis, Kyle is held in an alien prison before escaping and gaining a new ring from Hal Jordan and Sojourner Mullein. He accompanies them in freeing the Justice League before battling Pariah and the Great Darkness.

In DC All In, Kyle regains his White Lantern abilities to help battle Thaaros and Varron, who threaten the emotional spectrum.

== Powers and abilities ==
As a Green Lantern, Kyle Rayner is semi-invulnerable, capable of projecting hard-light constructions, flight, and utilizing various other abilities through his power ring which are only limited by his imagination and willpower. Kyle's constructs are much more elaborate than those of any other Green Lanterns, often fading into view like a sketch refined into an illustration. Eventually, he is able to utilize his skill as an artist to manipulate the pigments and dimensions within his constructs, making them appear so realistic that even Alan Scott was amazed at what Kyle could do with his ring's creations.

Kyle's ring was constructed from what remained of Hal Jordan's ring by Ganthet. It is keyed to Kyle and Hal Jordan's DNA, making it only accessible to them unless the bearer willed the ring to another individual. This is done by Ganthet to prevent the last ring from being stolen, as there would be no other Lantern to send to retrieve it. Unlike most of the Green Lanterns' rings, Kyle's did not require a twenty-four-hour period of recharge, only when the ring's capacity was depleted; and it was not necessary to recite the Corps' oath when recharged. Kyle is the first Lantern not to suffer from a weakness to items colored yellow. Both Mongul and Superman are surprised at this upon first encountering him. Kyle states that he didn't know about the weakness and never had any trouble with it. Originally, this was explained as his ring being a "new model", which also explained why it had slightly different abilities than those seen previously. Later, this was retconned with the explanation that rings can affect yellow if the user faces and overcomes their fear; as an artist, Kyle had faced his fear of rejection every time he showed his work, and this extended to his constructs, which he considered part of his artwork.

When bonded with the benevolent Ion symbiont, Kyle was capable of much more elaborate usage of his imagination which can extend to the manipulation of reality. In possession of the more sinister Parallax entity, Kyle was theoretically capable of similar feats.

During his relationship with Donna Troy, Kyle engaged in combat training with his then-girlfriend. During his first battle with Fatality, he proved to be a formidable fighter and was able to defeat her when his ring was drained. In nearly every encounter with Fatality since that incident, Kyle would use his combat skills to defeat her rather than his ring to maintain an element of surprise (she expected him to use his ring) or when his ring is drained or absent during battles. As a member of the Justice League, Kyle occasionally would train in the League's combat training systems on the Watchtower and under the tutelage of combat-experienced Leaguers, such as Batman. Even though Kyle is now a skilled hand-to-hand combatant, having been trained by the Dark Knight himself, he is not an expert in hand-to-hand; for example, while he initially held his own in a hand-to-hand fight with Sinestro, the villain proved to be a better fighter due to his greater experience.

As an Honor Guard Illustres, Kyle ranks only below Salaak, who holds the rank of Clarissi, and the Guardians in the new Corps chain of command.

During a brief period where he was turned into a 'magnet' for all rings, Kyle could briefly wield the power of the entire emotional spectrum, but the strain of doing so meant that the other six rings disintegrated after only a few moments, leaving him feeling significantly weakened by the effort. Despite all of the rings barring his own turning to dust, a measure of each ring's power resides in Kyle, which he is able to channel in a combined burst of multicolored lights. After mastering all aspects of the emotional spectrum, Kyle became a White Lantern. As a White Lantern, Kyle can heal injuries and ailments, although by his own admission he cannot resurrect the dead. His ring is more powerful than a standard power ring and can replicate the abilities of any ring in the spectrum except black.

Kyle was later revealed to possess the Life Equation as a result of being inside the Source Wall. With the Equation, Kyle could manipulate reality itself. However, Kyle was unable to control this level of power and was dying because of it. As a result, Kyle divided the Life Equation by creating seven additional White Lantern power rings and gave them to the most worthy candidates. He swore to never unite the rings unless absolutely necessary. In the Rebirth storyline, when Kyle attempted to use the white ring to resurrect the Blue Lantern Corps, some unspecified force resisted his efforts, causing his ring to 'break' into seven different rings of the seven Corps, the other six rings flying off to find new wielders while Kyle retained his original Green Lantern ring.

== Other versions ==
Various alternate universe versions of Kyle Rayner have appeared throughout the character's publication history. In Green Lantern: Evil's Might, Rayner is a political cartoonist in the late 1800s who was formerly an associate of Alan Scott before breaking ties with him after he killed shopkeeper Angus Kelly. He is later mortally wounded while battling Scott and gives Carol Ferris his ring before dying. Kylie Rayner, an alternate universe gender-flipped version of Kyle Rayner from Earth-11, appears in Countdown Presents: The Search for Ray Palmer. In JLA: Act of God, Rayner lost his powers during the "Black Light Event" and was subsequently killed by Sonar.

== Collected editions ==
| Title | Material collected | Publication date | ISBN |
|---|---|---|---|
| Green Lantern: Emerald Twilight | Green Lantern (vol. 3) #48–50 | March 1, 1994 | 978-1563891649 |
| Green Lantern: A New Dawn | Green Lantern (vol. 3) #51-55 | January 1, 1997 | 978-1563892226 |
| Green Lantern: Emerald Twilight/A New Dawn | Green Lantern (vol. 3) #48-55 | September 4, 2003 | 978-1563899997 |
| Green Lantern: Baptism of Fire | Green Lantern (vol. 3) #59, 66-67, 70-75 | March 1, 1999 | 978-1563895241 |
| Green Lantern: Emerald Allies | Green Lantern (vol. 3) #76-77, 92, Green Arrow (vol. 2) #104, 110-111, 125-126 | March 1, 2000 | 978-1563892226 |
| Green Lantern: Emerald Knights | Green Lantern (vol. 3) #99-106, Green Arrow (vol. 2) #136 | November 1, 1998 | 978-1563894756 |
| Green Lantern: New Journey, Old Path | Green Lantern (vol. 3) #129-136 | February 1, 2002 | 978-1563897290 |
| Green Lantern: Circle of Fire | Green Lantern: Circle of Fire #1-2, Green Lantern/The Atom #1, Green Lantern/Adam Strange #1, Green Lantern/Power Girl #1, Green Lantern/Firestorm #1, Green Lantern/Green Lantern #1 | May 1, 2002 | 978-1563898068 |
| Green Lantern: The Power of Ion | Green Lantern (vol. 3) #142-150 | February 1, 2003 | 978-1563899720 |
| Green Lantern: Brother's Keeper | Green Lantern (vol. 3) #151-155, Green Lantern Secret Files and Origins #3 | June 1, 2003 | 978-1401200787 |
| Green Lantern: Passing the Torch | Green Lantern (vol. 3) #156, 158-161 | August 1, 2004 | 978-1401202378 |
| Ion: Guardian of the Universe Vol. 1 - The Torchbearer | Ion: Guardian of the Universe #1-6 | January 1, 2007 | 978-1401211974 |
| Ion: Guardian of the Universe Vol. 2 - The Dying Flame | Ion: Guardian of the Universe #7-12 | September 1, 2007 | 978-1401215514 |
| Green Lantern: Kyle Rayner Vol. 1 | Green Lantern (vol. 3) #48-57 and #0, R.E.B.E.L.S. '94 #1, The New Titans #116-117 | October 10, 2017 | 978-1401276874 |
| Green Lantern: Kyle Rayner Vol. 2 | Green Lantern (vol. 3) #58-65, Guy Gardner: Warrior #27-28, The New Titans #124-125, Darkstars #34, Damage #16 | May 8, 2018 | 978-1401278502 |
| Green Lantern: Kyle Rayner Vol. 3 | Green Lantern (vol. 3) #66-75, Annual #4 | Cancelled | 978-1401285715 |
| Green Lantern: Kyle Rayner Rising Compendium | Green Lantern (vol. 3) #0, #48-65, R.E.B.E.L.S. ’94 #1, The New Titans #116-117, #124-125, Guy Gardner: Warrior #27-28, Darkstars #34, Damage #16 | November 21, 2023 | 978-1779526274 |

== In other media ==
=== Television ===
- Kyle Rayner / Green Lantern appears in series set in the DC Animated Universe (DCAU):
  - Rayner first appears in the Superman: The Animated Series episode "In Brightest Day...", voiced by Michael P. Greco. This version is initially a newspaper commercial artist and aspiring comic artist for the Daily Planet before being chosen by Abin Sur to succeed him.
  - Rayner makes a non-speaking cameo appearance in the Justice League episode "Hereafter" Pt. 2 as an attendee of Superman's funeral.
  - Rayner appears in the Justice League Unlimited episode "The Return", voiced by Will Friedle.
- Kyle Rayner appears in the Mad segment "That's What Super Friends Are For".
- Kyle Rayner will appear in My Adventures with Green Lantern.

=== Video games ===
- Kyle Rayner / Green Lantern appears as an unlockable playable character in Justice League Heroes, voiced by John Rubinow.
- Kyle Rayner / Green Lantern appears in DC Universe Online.
- Kyle Rayner / Green Lantern was going to appear as a playable character in a video game adaptation of the "Emerald Twilight" storyline for the SNES by Ocean Software before it was cancelled.
- Kyle Rayner appears as a character summon in Scribblenauts Unmasked: A DC Comics Adventure.
- Kyle Rayner / White Lantern appears as a playable character in Lego Batman 3: Beyond Gotham, voiced by Josh Keaton.

=== Miscellaneous ===
- A hologram of Kyle Rayner appears in Legion of Super Heroes in the 31st Century #6.
- Kyle Rayner / Green Lantern appears in the Justice League of America book Hero's Quest, by Dennis O'Neil. This version was chosen by Ganthet to stop the Guardians of the Universe after they abandoned the Green Lantern Corps to remake the universe.
- Kyle Rayner / Green Lantern appears in the Injustice: Gods Among Us prequel comic. After spending a year away, he returns to Earth, only to be intercepted and killed by the Sinestro Corps.
- Kyle Rayner appeared in the 196th episode of the long-running crossover web series Death Battle, where he faced against Simon from the manga and anime series Gurren Lagann, who he lost to.
