= Jack T. Chance =

- Jack T. Chance as depicted in Green Lantern Corps Quarterly #1 (Summer 1992). Art by M. D. Bright.

Publication information
- Publisher: DC Comics
- First appearance: Green Lantern Corps Quarterly #1 (Summer 1992)
- Created by: John Ostrander (writer); Flint Henry (artist)

In-story information
- Full name: Jack T. Chance
- Team affiliations: Green Lantern Corps; Black Lantern Corps
- Abilities: Green and Black Lantern power rings

Jack T. Chance is a fictional character featured in comic books published by DC Comics. He is a Green Lantern from the world of Garnet—also known as Hellhole. He first appeared in Green Lantern Corps Quarterly #1 in the summer of 1992, and was created by writer John Ostrander and artist Flint Henry.

== Fictional character biography ==
Jack T. Chance is from the planet Garnet, also known as 'Hellhole' due to being overrun with crime. The Guardians of the Universe dispatch several Green Lanterns to Garnet in hope of improving its conditions, but each attempt ends in failure or the Lantern being killed. The last Guardian-sent agent, Pathavim Seth-Ottarak, instructs his ring to find a replacement among Hellhole's inhabitants uniquely suited to the challenges of the world and not limited by the Green Lanterns' usual morals. The ring chooses Jack T. Chance and explains his duties to him. Chance rejects the idea of a uniform, refusing to wear anything other than his own clothes with a badge added.

Chance hunts down the man who killed his predecessor, intending to kill him in turn, only to find the ring has a failsafe against lethal force. Instead, Chance uses a crude firearm to shoot the man dead. This becomes Chance's standard methodology as he pacifies Garnet, wearing down targets with the powers of the ring then delivering a killing blow with a sidearm. In response, the Guardians force Chance to undergo rigorous training and a probationary period before he is allowed to continue serving with the Green Lantern Corps. Additionally, he is restricted to operating on Garnet and his actions are subject to review to ensure he is not using 'questionable methods'.

Sometime later, Chance encounters and battles Lobo. The fight takes a turn for the worse when Lobo realizes that the ring had a weakness to yellow. Lobo covers himself in the yellow blood of a downed citizen, defeats Chance, and cuts off his finger after realizing that he cannot directly take his ring. As Lobo walks off, the ring informs him that it will not work outside Garnet. Disappointed, Lobo leaves Garnet and abandons the finger and ring, which make their way back to Chance and reattach themselves.

=== Emerald Twilight ===
When Hal Jordan is driven mad by the destruction of Coast City and attacks Oa, the guardians were desperate and called Chance, as their most 'ruthless' agent, to stop the rampaging Jordan. To this end, they grant his ring the same abilities as other members of the Corps, and its power is no longer limited to Garnet's atmosphere. Chance attacks Jordan, who takes his ring and leaves him and several other Lanterns for dead.

=== Return and death ===
Jack T. Chance's death in Green Lantern (vol. 4) #22 (August 2007). Art by Ivan Reis.

Chance is later revealed to have survived and been captured along with several other Lanterns to be used by the Manhunters as fuel for their software. He is freed by Hal Jordan and Guy Gardner and safely returned to Oa. Even though Chance and the Lost Lanterns are aware that Jordan's prior actions were the result of influence from the entity Parallax, they still bear a grudge against him. Chance's return causes the Guardians to reconsider his status as a probationary member, and he is finally accepted in the ranks of the Green Lantern Corps.

In the fourth volume of Green Lantern, Kyle Rayner is whisked away by a yellow lantern ring during the Sinestro Corps attack on Oa. Chance and a select few Green Lanterns are sent to Qward to rescue Rayner and Hal Jordan. While on Qward, the Lanterns discover that Rayner has been possessed by Parallax, making him as murderous as Jordan was. Chance confronts Parallax, who forces him to confront his repressed memories of his abusive childhood before killing him and crushing his ring.

=== Blackest Night ===
During the Blackest Night event, all of the deceased Green Lanterns buried on Oa are reanimated by black power rings and become members of the Black Lantern Corps. Chance is among the Black Lanterns shown standing against the Green Lanterns on Oa.

== In other media ==
Jack T. Chance appears as a character summon in Scribblenauts Unmasked: A DC Comics Adventure.
