= Ion (DC Comics) =

- Ion as depicted in Green Lantern (vol. 4) #52 (May 2010). Art by Doug Mahnke.

Publication information
- Publisher: DC Comics
- First appearance: As Kyle Rayner: Green Lantern vol. 3 #145 (February 2002); Revealed to be an entity: Green Lantern/Sinestro Corps Special #1 (August 2007)
- Created by: Original concept: Judd Winick; Dale Eaglesham; Emotional Entity: Geoff Johns; Ethan Van Sciver

In-story information
- Species: Embodiment of willpower
- Team affiliations: Green Lantern Corps; Guardians of the Universe
- Abilities: When bonded with Kyle Rayner: The sum total of all the energies contained by the Guardians of the Universe and the Central Power Battery which granted the possessor nigh-omnipotent control over time, space and reality. Emotional Entity: Bestows its host with flight, energy manipulation, and other powers similar to a Green Lantern Corps Power Ring and (when fused with Jade) the Starheart.

Ion is a fictional character, a DC Comics superhero. Created by writer Judd Winick and artist Dale Eaglesham for Green Lantern (vol. 3) #142, Ion was devised as the new superhero identity for Green Lantern protagonist Kyle Rayner. It was later revealed to be able to form mutualism with a host, bestowing its power to a host willingly. This followed a similar retcon as Parallax, originally the new supervillain alias of Hal Jordan, which was revealed to be a parasitic embodiment of fear in the 2004–2005 miniseries Green Lantern: Rebirth.

== Fictional character biography ==
Kyle Rayner as Ion, the Torchbearer of the Guardians of the Universe.

As soon as sentient beings developed willpower, Ion was born from the green wavelength of the so-called "emotional spectrum". Its existence has been kept a secret for eons, and it resided in the Central Battery on Oa to keep Parallax, the parasitic fear entity also imprisoned there, in check, as well as granting the Guardians of the Universe and their successive police forces such as the Green Lantern Corps a portion of its vast powers. After Hal Jordan, under the influences of Parallax and Sinestro, destroyed the Central Battery, Ion, along with Parallax and Sinestro, were set free. After wandering throughout the cosmos, it eventually settled within Kyle Rayner as its host.

=== Power of Ion ===
Kyle first assumes the Ion identity after a prolonged series of events stemming from the death of his girlfriend Alex. First, he unconsciously expels all his feelings of rage from himself, which takes physical form as one of Kyle's childhood nightmares and calls itself Oblivion. Kyle defeats Oblivion in the "Circle of Fire" storyline, and his powers are boosted as a result. Over time, his powers begin to grow even stronger until Kyle realized he is harnessing the Green Lantern energy left in the sun after Hal Jordan's death during "The Final Night". After a battle over control of the power with the villain Nero, Kyle absorbs all the powers of the Green Lantern Corps and becomes Ion.

Kyle uses his newly expanded abilities to recreate the Guardians of the Universe on the planet Oa, whom he places in the care of Ganthet and orders him to teach them humility, and then recharges the Central Power Battery on Oa. Kyle willingly gives up his powers soon afterward when he realizes he is losing touch with the people he was protecting.

=== Return of Ion ===
Sometime after resuming the Green Lantern identity, Kyle becomes Ion once again when Jade transfers all of her abilities to Kyle after her death during the events of the Rann–Thanagar War. This is then followed by a twelve-part Ion miniseries. The series follows Kyle as he accepts his new role as "the Torchbearer" for the Guardians and the Corps. While doing so, he is confronted with the most challenging adversaries from his past as Green Lantern and the sudden illness of his mother Maura, who ultimately dies. It is later revealed that Maura died after being infected by Sinestro Corps member Despotellis as part of a conspiracy against Kyle to break his spirit.

=== Sinestro Corps War ===
The Ion entity, extracted by force from host Kyle Rayner by Sinestro in Green Lantern Sinestro Corps Special (2007). Art by Ethan Van Sciver.

Sodam Yat as Ion, from Green Lantern Corps (vol. 2) #17. Art by Patrick Gleason.

The 2007 one-shot special Green Lantern/Sinestro Corps Special reveals that Ion is a non-corporeal entity who was forcefully extracted from Kyle and imprisoned on Qward by the Sinestro Corps. After expelling Ion from Kyle, Sinestro forces Kyle to bond with Parallax, who possesses him. Ion is eventually freed by several members of the Green Lantern Corps after being experimented on by the Anti-Monitor.

In Green Lantern Corps (vol. 2) #17, the Guardians, feeling that Kyle better serves the Corps as a Green Lantern, choose the Daxamite Sodam Yat as the new host for Ion. Witnessing the creation of the new Ion, Superman-Prime attacks him in the skies above New York. The pair is matched in terms of power until the fight moves into a nuclear power plant where Sodam Yat's Daxamite physiology causes him to be severely weakened by the lead present in the reactor. With Sodam's powers diminished by lead poisoning, Prime nearly beats him to death.

In Tales of the Sinestro Corps Presents: Ion, following the events of the war, the Guardians request Kyle Rayner assist Sodam in adjusting to his new role. While speaking about Sodam's history and attitude as a Lantern, it is revealed that Sodam must now permanently wear a power ring to prevent the lead in his body from killing him. They are then attacked by Nero, who had been freed during the initial assault on Oa. Kyle fights at less than full power to encourage Sodam to embrace his status as Ion. Sodam eventually defeats Nero with the same strategy that Kyle used when Nero first gained the yellow power ring, before the creation of the Sinestro Corp: seizing control of Nero's own constructs.

The birth of Ion.

=== Blackest Night ===
In the "Blackest Night" storyline, Sinestro bonds with the Life Entity and sees the beginning of existence and the origin of the emotional spectrum. Ion is revealed to be the first living being that ever willed itself to move.

=== The New 52 ===
During the "Green Lantern: Lights Out" event, Ion and the emotional entities are weakened by the emotional spectrum being drained and sacrifice themselves by passing into the Source Wall to repair the spectrum. Ion returns in Green Lantern Corps (vol. 4), where the Green Lantern Corps free it and the other entities from the Source Wall to help combat Starbreaker.
