= Sodam Yat =

DC Comics superhero character

- Sodam Yat as Ion, as he appeared in Green Lantern/Sinestro Corps Secret Files #1 (December 2007); Art by Patrick Gleason.

Publication information
- Publisher: DC Comics
- First appearance: Tales of the Green Lantern Corps Annual #2 (1986)
- Created by: Alan Moore (writer); Kevin O'Neill (artist)

In-story information
- Full name: Sodam Yat
- Species: Daxamite
- Place of origin: Daxam
- Team affiliations: Green Lantern Corps; Guardians of the Universe
- Notable aliases: Ion, Yat, Yatmite
- Abilities: Daxamite abilities: See list: Superhuman strength, hearing, durability, and longevity; Superhuman vision; Heat vision; Microscopic vision; X-ray vision; Telescopic vision; Infrared vision; Superhuman breath; Freeze breath; Wind breath; Superhuman speed; Superhuman agility; Superhuman reflexes; Invulnerability; Healing Factor; Flight; Power ring abilities: Force field; Generation of hard-light constructs; Real-time translation of all languages; Ion

Sodam Yat is a fictional character, an extraterrestrial superhero published by DC Comics. He first appeared in Tales of the Green Lantern Corps Annual #2 (1986), and was created by Alan Moore and Kevin O'Neill. He operated as Ion, having become one of the most powerful characters in current continuity. In 2013, ComicsAlliance ranked Sodam Yat as #32 on their list of the "50 Sexiest Male Characters in Comics".

== Fictional character biography ==
=== Introduction ===
Sodam Yat is a prophesied future member of the Green Lantern Corps, created by Alan Moore and is first mentioned in "Tygers", a story in Tales of the Green Lantern Corps Annual #2. He is mentioned in passing to Abin Sur by a demon named Qull of the Five Inversions, who had been imprisoned on the planet Ysmault by the Guardians of the Universe. As a Daxamite (a race which descended from Kryptonians with inherent Superman-like powers) with a power ring, he would be nearly unstoppable. Despite this, in Qull's prophecy, he is still defeated as part of the final destruction of the Green Lantern Corps.

Alan Moore planned to use the character in his proposed story, "Twilight of the Superheroes", which went unpublished. In the proposal that was leaked onto the Internet, the Daxamite Green Lantern is named "Sodal Yat" and is also referred to as "The Ultimate Green Lantern". In that story, Sodal Yat is the last of an army of aliens to attack Superman. The Man of Steel defeats many Green Lanterns, Thanagarians, and Martian Manhunter before Yat kills him. The character would subsequently go unused until 2006.

=== Modern incarnation ===
As a young boy, Sodam Yat wanted nothing more than to explore the stars, but the xenophobic Daxam society forbade it. When a spacecraft crashes on Daxam, Sodam rescues the pilot Tessog and befriends him. However, his parents kill Tessog and make him believe that he was a violent menace. Years later, while visiting a museum, Sodam sees Tessog's preserved body on display and regains his memories. Enraged by this, he rebuilds Tessog's ship to leave Daxam, attracting a green power ring in the process.

Sodam Yat makes his first appearance in regular DC continuity in Green Lantern Corps #12 and part three of the Sinestro Corps War (Green Lantern Corps #14) when Kilowog gathers a group of Lanterns to strike back against Sinestro's forces attack in Space Sector 2263. Salaak singles out Arisia Rrab to keep an eye on the newly graduated Lantern Yat, though she wonders why Yat is so important. Salaak has been charged by the Guardians of the Universe to keep Qull's prophecy from coming to pass but keeps this to himself, only saying that one day she may know why he is so special. In Green Lantern Corps #16 he destroys the core of Ranx the Sentient City, ending the battle of Mogo.

In Green Lantern Corps #17, Yat is chosen as the new host for Ion by the Guardians of the Universe and fights Superboy-Prime. The two battle each other fiercely through different areas of New York. While the two trade blows, Ion is thrown into a nuclear power plant. The lead lining the walls weakens Ion. Prime takes the opportunity to spear him with several uranium rods, injuring him. Ion tries to escape, only to have Prime knock him into a cemetery. They continue to do battle, each drawing blood from their opponent. Although Ion battles courageously, the lead poisoning and loss of blood weakens him and he is beaten unconscious. He is later seen receiving medical attention from Soranik Natu.

After the events of the war, the Guardians request Kyle Rayner assist Yat in adjusting to his new role. While speaking about Yat's history and attitude as a Lantern, it is revealed that he must now permanently wear a power ring to prevent the lead in his body from killing him. They are then attacked by Alexander Nero, who had been freed during the initial assault on Oa, but had not participated in the overall Sinestro Corps story. Rayner fights to less than his abilities to encourage Yat to embrace his status as Ion. Yat eventually defeats Nero by taking control of Nero's own constructs, something Rayner states that he had never attempted.

Some time later, Yat and Arisia receive word of the Sinestro Corps' invasion of Daxam from Yat's mother, who had escaped using the ship that her son was going to use to escape Daxam. While fighting the Sinestro Corps, Yat enters Daxam's sun and turns it yellow, enabling the Daxamites to fight off the invasion. However, Krona later frees him from the sun, seeking to capture the entire emotional spectrum.

=== The New 52 ===
Sodam Yat is reintroduced in The New 52 during the Green Lantern crossover Uprising. He was at some point captured by the Durlans, who kept him on the planet Corona Seven before the Green Lanterns rescued him. In the DC Rebirth initiative, he helps the Green Lanterns fight Cyborg Superman.

== Powers and abilities ==
As a Daxamite, Sodam Yat possesses similar abilities to a Kryptonian, including superhuman physical abilities, flight, super-hearing, super-vision, and super-breath. However, he is vulnerable to lead rather than Kryptonite. As the host of Ion, he possesses amplified powers and longevity.

== Other versions ==
An alternate timeline variant of Sodam Yat appears in Final Crisis: Legion of 3 Worlds. In the 31st century, he resides on the remnants of Oa before the Legion of Super-Heroes encounter him and encourage him to create a new Green Lantern Corps.

== In other media ==
Sodam Yat appears as a character summon in Scribblenauts Unmasked: A DC Comics Adventure.
