= Parallax (character) =

DC universe character

- Parallax as depicted in Sinestro #13 (July 2015); Art by Andrew Hennessy.

Publication information
- Publisher: DC Comics
- First appearance: As Hal Jordan: Green Lantern (vol. 3) #50 (March 1994); Revealed to be an entity: Green Lantern: Rebirth #3 (February 2005)
- Created by: Original concept: Ron Marz; Darryl Banks; Emotional Entity: Geoff Johns; Ethan Van Sciver

In-story information
- Species: Embodiment of fear
- Team affiliations: Sinestro Corps
- Notable aliases: The yellow impurity
- Abilities: Hal Jordan/Kyle Rayner: Large-scale reality alteration Control over time Emotional Entity: Flight; Possession; Mind-control; Fear-induction; Solid energy constructs

Parallax is a supervillain appearing in American comic books published by DC Comics, primarily as an enemy of the Green Lantern Corps. It is the embodiment of the emotion of fear, and serves as the power source for the Sinestro Corps.

== Publication history ==
Created by writer Ron Marz and artist Darryl Banks for Green Lantern vol. 3 #48 (January 1994), Parallax was originally devised as the new supervillain identity for Green Lantern protagonist Hal Jordan who had gone mad with grief after a catastrophic loss. After Jordan sacrificed himself to reignite Earth's Sun in the 1996 crossover storyline "The Final Night" and his soul became the newest host of the Spectre, 2004's Green Lantern: Rebirth once again cast Jordan as a heroic Green Lantern and explained Parallax as an ancient entity embodying the yellow light of fear which possessed Jordan and drove him to his villainous actions. Parallax was revealed to have been once imprisoned within the Central Power Battery on the planet Oa, creating the impurity that previously rendered the rings useless against anything colored yellow.

In 2009, Parallax was ranked as IGN's 92nd Greatest Comic Book Villain of All Time.

== Fictional character biography ==
The Hal Jordan incarnation of Parallax as depicted in Green Lantern (vol. 3) #50 (March 1994). Art by Darryl Banks.

In 1994, in an effort to generate interest in its Green Lantern comics, DC replaced Hal Jordan, who had been the primary Green Lantern since the late 1950s, with the character Kyle Rayner, and eliminated the Green Lantern Corps which had served as supporting characters in the series. This was done in the story "Emerald Twilight", beginning in Green Lantern vol. 3 #48 (Jan. 1994). After Mongul destroys his home town Coast City, Hal Jordan descends into madness, destroying the Green Lantern Corps, killing his friend Kilowog and all of the Guardians of the Universe, except for Ganthet. After this, Jordan assumed the name Parallax and became a supervillain. In the crossover Zero Hour: Crisis in Time!, Parallax attempted to rewrite history to stop the destruction of Coast City by using chronal energy, pulled from the universe by the combined power of the rings of the Green Lanterns he had killed. While Kyle Rayner became the primary Green Lantern of Earth for the next decade, Hal Jordan terrorized the DC universe as the villain Parallax and attempted to make Cyborg Superman pay for the destruction of Coast City.

During The Final Night storyline, Jordan sacrifices himself to reignite Earth's sun after it is nearly completely eaten. His soul not at peace, Jordan becomes the new Spectre to seek redemption for his actions as Parallax. The 2004 miniseries Green Lantern: Rebirth, written by Geoff Johns and penciled by Ethan Van Sciver, reveals that Parallax is an ancient embodiment of fear who possessed Jordan during the events of Emerald Twilight. The Guardians of the Universe imprisoned Parallax within the Central Power Battery on Oa using fear's opposite energy, willpower, embodied by one of the fear's counterparts, Ion. Parallax had lain dormant for billions of years, its true nature hidden by the Guardians to prevent anyone from trying to free it. Parallax eventually came to be referred to as simply "the yellow impurity", a flaw, whose nature was kept secret from the Corps, that made their rings useless against the color yellow. When Sinestro is imprisoned in the Power Battery, he awakens Parallax and leads to Jordan being chosen by it.

Kyle Rayner and fellow Green Lanterns John Stewart, Guy Gardner, Kilowog, Hal Jordan, and Ganthet imprison the parasite back in the Central Power Battery on Oa. Despite this reintroduction of the "yellow impurity", the power rings' weakness against yellow no longer applies, as experienced wielders are now able to consciously recognize and overcome it. It is still, however, a considerable weakness for new Green Lantern recruits and rookies, who must be taught the impurity's nature and how to combat it.

=== Sinestro Corps ===
The Kyle Rayner incarnation of Parallax as depicted in Green Lantern: Sinestro Corps Special (August 2007). Art by Ethan Van Sciver.

Sinestro's Sinestro Corps captures Kyle Rayner with the intention of making him Parallax's new host. Sinestro reveals to Kyle the existence of Ion. Sinestro also informs him that Ion is actually an energy entity that needs a host, similar to Parallax, and it is now attached to Kyle's soul. Sinestro removes the Ion entity from Kyle, who is immediately taken over by Parallax. Parallax then clothes itself in a new uniform (which appears as a combination of Kyle's original Green Lantern costume and the costume Hal Jordan wore as Parallax) and returns to Qward with the Sinestro Corps. Parallax becomes a herald of the reborn Anti-Monitor alongside Hank Henshaw, Superman-Prime, and Sinestro himself. After the massacre of several Green Lanterns, Parallax leads an assault against Hal Jordan, John Stewart, and Guy Gardner, and brings them to Qward. The "Lost Lanterns" arrive to rescue the captured Lanterns. During the battle, Parallax murders Jack T. Chance after making him experience his repressed fear of his abusive family. Kyle and Parallax confront each other in a room constructed by Kyle's memories. Kyle changes into Ion and fights Parallax and later conjures a power ring and his original costume. After fighting Parallax for a while, Kyle stabs Parallax and regains his self-worth when he sees a painting that his mother made years ago.

Soon after, Guy comes to Parallax with Kyle's mother's painting. This, along with Hal's aid, allows Kyle to fight Parallax from within, and the two manage to escape from Parallax. Now in its original form, Parallax begins to attack Hal, Guy, John, and Kyle. Ganthet and Sayd arrive and imprison Parallax within the Earth Lanterns' four Power Batteries.

=== Blackest Night ===
While Jordan and his allies defend Coast City against the Black Lantern Corps during the "Blackest Night" storyline, the Black Lantern Spectre attempts to claim him. Believing that the Spectre fears Parallax, Hal Jordan has Ganthet summon the power batteries that currently held it. Once summoned, Hal allows Sinestro to release Parallax and, once it is free, provokes it into merging with him. A resulting explosion of yellow light quickly fades and soon reveals that Parallax is in full control of Hal and eager to challenge the Spectre once more. Parallax tears into the Black Lantern Spectre's body, freeing the real Spectre and destroying the facsimile. Parallax then attempts to destroy the Spectre, who uses his own fear of it, coupled with the love Carol Ferris feels for Hal, to separate Parallax from its host. Parallax is then pulled away by an unknown force to an unknown location.

After Sinestro becomes a White Lantern, he views the history of the emotional spectrum and learns that Parallax was originally an insect who was transformed after becoming the first creature in existence to feel fear.

=== Brightest Day ===
The Barry Allen incarnation of Parallax as depicted in Green Lantern (vol. 4) #59 (November 2010). Art by Doug Mahnke.

During the "Brightest Day" storyline, Parallax is revealed to have been transported to planet Ryut, where a cloaked villain traps it in an energy bubble and chains it to a monolith bearing the Sinestro Corps symbol. Around Parallax are other monoliths bearing the symbols of the other Lantern corps. When Hal Jordan, the Flash, and the rest of their allies try to find the emotional entities, they locate Parallax, who possesses Flash after it senses the hero's concerns for Jordan's safety. By inhabiting the living generator of the Speed Force, Parallax is even more powerful by combining the extradimensional energy the speedster creates with its own powers. Parallax intends to possess Hal Jordan, but is stopped by an unknown being. The compassion entity, Proselyte, frees the Flash from Parallax's control by reigniting his emotion for compassion over his fear. The hope entity, Adara, confronts the cloaked villain, who reveals that all this is actually a ruse so that he could capture them all — which he does — revealing himself to be the renegade Guardian Krona.

=== War of the Green Lanterns ===
When Krona attacks Oa, he places Parallax inside the Central Power Battery, restoring the yellow impurity and giving him control over almost all Green Lanterns. Hal, John, Guy, Kyle and Kilowog resist Parallax's influence due to their past experience with it, but Kilowog is captured while the other four escape by removing their rings. With no other weapons available, the four Earth Lanterns use the rings of the other Corps to fight off Krona's forces, culminating in Guy using the rings of the Red Lantern Corps and the Star Sapphires simultaneously to remove Parallax from the battery. After Krona's defeat, Parallax escapes with the other entities and is left at large.

=== The New 52 ===
In September 2011, The New 52 rebooted DC's continuity. In this new timeline, it is shown that Parallax is in the Yellow Central Power Battery, where the entity stays until he is released by Sinestro at the conclusion of the "Wrath of the First Lantern" story. To destroy the First Lantern Volthoom, Sinestro allows Parallax to possess him, but maintains control of his body. Their effort in defeating Volthoom, however, proves to be unsuccessful, with Volthoom only being defeated when Hal returns as a Black Lantern and summons Nekron to restore Volthoom's mortality. After Volthoom's defeat, Sinestro as Parallax proceeds to kill the Guardians of the Universe, sparing only Ganthet and Sayd. Sinestro then states his intention to travel far from Oa and release Parallax.

In the "Lights Out" story, the Entity reveals that all of the emotional entities are dying and must return to the place of their origin, except Parallax because it is currently entrapped. In the aftermath, it is revealed that Parallax is still bonded with Sinestro, who controls the entity. After the Green Lantern Corps is apparently dissolved, Sinestro releases Parallax within the core of Warworld's base, to try to prevent the destruction of the new headquarters of the Sinestro Corps.

=== DC Rebirth ===
In 2016, DC Comics implemented a relaunch of its books called DC Rebirth, which restored its continuity to a form much as it was prior to The New 52. Parallax is being hosted by Sinestro again as he has plans to rule the universe with fear. The power of Parallax is increased by Sinestro to one thousand percent of the power of fear to face Hal Jordan, who has returned as Green Lantern. Before Sinestro attacks him, he discovers too late that his and Parallax's powers have decreased due to Soranik Natu rescuing people from being imprisoned and escaping with them. Hal then uses his energies as a living construct to incinerate the Fear Warlord. Sinestro tries to use Parallax's powers to stop Hal, but fails as Hal destroys the base of the Sinestro Corps, Warworld, seemingly killing both Sinestro and Parallax in the process.

Parallax is revealed to have survived and found its way to Earth, having shrunk in size. It starts kidnapping children to feed on their fear and regain its strength and power. The entity possesses the body of one of the children, Zachariah Ferruci, and kidnaps another child until they are found by Superman. Parallax uses the children to fight back against Superman and flees. The next day, Parallax welcomes Superman to the place where it is keeping the children. Parallax transforms into his normal size and reveals to Superman who he is. Parallax tries to possess Superman, but Superman is able to force it out. However, Parallax begins draining the children's lives, forcing Superman to submit. Parallax possesses Superman and as it claims that nothing can hurt it anymore, Parallax is struck from behind by Sinestro, who has returned to claim it for himself. During the fight, Parallax refuses to possess Sinestro for this action, so Sinestro teleports to Qward, as the Weaponers are to restrain the entity. While Parallax apparently possesses Superman, he is contained as Sinestro attempts to remove Parallax from Superman; however, Superman tells him that he is not under Parallax's control. Parallax is possessing the Weaponers to attack Sinestro. Parallax separates from the Weaponers and tries to escape. Sinestro fails to capture Parallax and so his power is drained and he collapses; then, Superman takes his yellow ring and flies into Parallax's mouth. Superman uses his fear to imprison Parallax within the yellow ring, while Sinestro is no match for Superman and flees.

== Powers and abilities ==
Parallax upon absorbing both Rayner and Jordan, revealing its true color. Art by Ivan Reis.

Parallax has immense fear-casting and mind-control powers, strong enough to easily frighten and control the likes of Superman, Wonder Woman, and even a being like the Spectre, except those who are capable of facing powerful fear such as Hal Jordan, Kyle Rayner or Batman. However, it was unable to control Alan Scott, even though he experienced fear from Parallax (Abin Sur explains that in humans fear is intellectual, which may have something to do with the ineffectuality of Parallax's powers and the fear entity itself mentioned that Alan's power differs from the fear entity, the Guardians, and the Green Lantern Corps, as they derive their powers from the emotional spectrum), although he did experience a fever which led him to increasingly weaken during Parallax's attempts that almost kill him. It can take possession of someone's body when they feel even the slightest fear. Parallax is also capable of creating solid light constructs, such as creating a convincing duplicate of Sinestro for Hal Jordan to kill. Parallax can create both green and yellow objects or creatures. As a being of pure energy, Parallax has no true physical form of its own; it generally changes into forms that will instill fear in its victims.

== Other versions ==
- An alternate timeline version of Parallax who possessed Tomar-Re appears in Booster Gold (vol. 2) #2.
- The Hal Jordan incarnation of Parallax makes a cameo appearance in JLA/Avengers.
- The Hal Jordan incarnation of Parallax appears in Convergence.

== In other media ==
=== Film ===
Parallax as it appears in Green Lantern.

- Parallax appears in Green Lantern, voiced by Clancy Brown and motion-captured by an uncredited T. J. Storm. This version feeds on life forces via organisms' fear and was created when Krona was corrupted by the yellow energy of fear after failing to control it. Abin Sur imprisoned the entity on the remote planet Ryut, but it later escapes and seeks revenge on the Green Lantern Corps, absorbing fear and life forces from multiple inhabited planets to strengthen itself and killing Abin in the process. After the Department of Extranormal Operations (DEO) recover Abin's body, they task Hector Hammond with performing the autopsy, during which he is infected with Parallax's DNA. It uses him in an attempt to kill Hal Jordan until he lures it away from Earth, where it is absorbed into the sun.
- Parallax appears in Green Lantern: Beware My Power, voiced by Nolan North. This version is an alien parasite used by Sinestro to infect Hal Jordan. It attempts to use his body to obtain godhood until being killed by Green Arrow.

=== Video games ===
- Parallax appears as a character summon in Scribblenauts Unmasked: A DC Comics Adventure.
- Parallax appears as a boss in DC Universe Online.

=== Miscellaneous ===
Parallax appears in Smallville: Lantern. After corrupting Hal Jordan, Parallax goes on to kill Kyle Rayner and Guy Gardner, reprogram the Manhunters to serve it, and send Yellow Lantern rings to Earth to combat the Green Lantern Corps.
