= The Final Night =

1996 DC comic book crossover storyline

- Cover of The Final Night (1998), trade paperback collected edition, art by Stuart Immonen.
- Publisher: DC Comics
- Publication date: November 1996
- Genre: Superhero; Crossover
Title(s)
Action Comics #727
The Adventures of Superman #540
Aquaman (vol. 5) #26
Batman #536-537
Detective Comics #703
The Final Night #1-4
The Final Night Preview #1
The Flash (vol. 2) #119
Green Arrow (vol. 2) #114
Green Lantern (vol. 3) #80-81
Hitman #8
Legion of Super-Heroes (vol. 4) #86
Parallax: Emerald Night #1
The Power of Shazam! #20
Robin (vol. 4) #35
Sovereign Seven #16
The Spectre (vol. 3) #47
Superboy (vol. 4) #33
Supergirl (vol. 4) #3
Superman (vol. 2) #117
Superman: The Man of Steel #62
Takion #6
- Main character(s): Justice League of America Legion of Super-Heroes; New Gods; Hal Jordan; Lex Luthor; Dusk DC Universe

Creative team
- Writer: Karl Kesel
- Penciller: Stuart Immonen
- Inker(s): Jose Marzan Jr. Jeff Albrecht; Del Barras
- Letterer: Gaspar Saladino
- Colorist(s): Lee Loughridge; Patricia Mulvihill
- Editor(s): Dan Thorsland; Ali Morales

The Final Night is a 1996 comic book crossover storyline published by DC Comics that ran through a weekly self-titled limited series and a score of tie-in issues spanning most of DC's ongoing titles in the month of September 1996 (cover-dated November). It featured the Justice League of America, several members of the Legion of Super-Heroes and more than two dozen allied heroes, villains and scientists of the DC Universe banding together in the face of global calamity when the alien Sun-Eater envelops and extinguishes the Sun, causing Earth to freeze and wither into ecological collapse.

Unlike other crossover events published by DC, the conflict of The Final Night did not revolve around a conventional villain. It was primarily a story of survival that focused on the main characters performing disaster response, while attempting to prevent impending mass extinction of all life on Earth. At the end of each issue was an in-story website feature written by S.T.A.R. Labs, giving information updates and emergency support to residents of the DC Universe as the crisis progressed.

The storyline is notable in DC canon for the death and disputed redemption of Green Lantern Hal Jordan, whose character at the time had been transformed into the villainous Parallax. Jordan's character was later restored to life and to his role as Earth's Green Lantern in the 2004 miniseries Green Lantern: Rebirth.

== Plot ==
In a brief prologue originally published as a promotional preview to the miniseries, before traveling to Earth's solar system, the Sun-Eater consumes the sun neighboring Starfire's newly-settled planet, New Tamaran. This triggers a supernova which destroys New Tamaran.

An unspecified amount of time later, Dusk arrives on Earth to warn the population that a Sun-Eater is heading towards Earth. Dusk is a member of an unknown alien race and does not speak or understand English, so Saturn Girl uses her telepathic powers to translate and teach her the language.

Despite Dusk's warnings, the Justice League still try to stop the Sun-Eater. For their first attempt, Mister Miracle tries using a boom tube to send it into another dimension. This proves unsuccessful, since the Sun-Eater is not entirely in the main dimension. As a last resort, Superman and several other heroes combine their energies to create a second sun and try to lure the Sun-Eater away from the Sun. The Sun-Eater quickly consumes the second sun before moving on to the main Sun.

As the Sun is extinguished, Earth falls into chaos and the planet starts to freeze. There are only five days to restore the Sun, after which Earth will become uninhabitable. Powerless to do anything to stop the freeze, the League tries to help control the chaos and to keep hope alive. Etrigan the Demon offers the entire world heat at the cost of their souls; the world rejects him, primarily because Etrigan intends to shift Earth into Hell. Lex Luthor teams up with the League to try to reignite the Sun.

Seeing Earth as another failure, Dusk decides that it is time for her to move on. As she prepares for takeoff, she encounters a stranger, and is shocked that he understands her language. The stranger takes Dusk on a quick trip around the world and shows her the League's efforts to keep hope alive. Dusk doubts that there is any hope left for the world. Eventually, the stranger disappears and Dusk is left alone in an alleyway. She is found by a small group of people and, thinking they are going to attack her again, prepares to defend herself. To her surprise, the group offer to take her to a shelter where she will be safe. This act of kindness gives her hope for Earth.

Meanwhile, scientists have realized that the Sun is losing energy, but not mass, to the Sun-Eater. This will cause the Sun to go nova and the explosion will catapult the Sun-Eater into another solar system, where it will consume another sun. The assembled heroes construct a technological means of destroying the Sun-Eater. Lex Luthor angrily bows out of piloting the ship needed, revealing that he was in it simply to save himself. This prompts Superman to volunteer in the hope that his powers will be restored by the solar surge as the Sun is restored. Ferro Lad steals the ship, only to be shunted back to Earth by Hal Jordan, the former Green Lantern then known as Parallax. Parallax sacrifices himself to absorb the Sun-Eater and reignite the Sun. The League watches in astonishment and Dusk says she no longer believes that anything is impossible.

== Key events and aftermath ==
- The Final Night culminates in the death of Hal Jordan and is the first in a series of storylines that eventually redeem him for his actions as Parallax in Emerald Twilight and Zero Hour: Crisis in Time!. Jordan returned in the 1999 crossover storyline Day of Judgment, in which his soul became a host for the Spectre. Jordan was later resurrected and reinstated as a Green Lantern in the 2004 series Green Lantern: Rebirth.
- Starfire's recently settled home world of New Tamaran is destroyed. Though Starfire survives the cataclysm, her sister Blackfire is presumed dead until the 2005 storyline Rann-Thanagar War. The destruction of New Tamaran prompts Starfire to return to Earth and rejoin the Teen Titans.
- Superman remains powerless after the Sun is re-ignited. This plotline continues throughout the Superman comics as his body converts into a being of pure energy and he develops new, energy-based powers requiring a specialized containment suit to maintain control of them and stay alive.
- In a later flashback to The Final Night occurring in the final page of Green Arrow (vol. 2) #137 (Oct. 1998), it is revealed that, prior to sacrificing his life, Hal Jordan had used his power as Parallax to resurrect his longtime friend Green Arrow, who was killed off in his own series in 1995.

== Reading order ==
The Final Night was primarily self-contained to a weekly four-issue limited series, with a number of tie-in issues reflecting the impacts of the storyline across the DC Universe in different characters' ongoing series. A special eight-page black-and-white preview solicitation was released prior to the first issue starring Starfire, which introduced Dusk and detailed the Sun-Eater's destruction of New Tamaran prior to traveling to Earth's solar system. A special tie-in one-shot starring Hal Jordan, Parallax: Emerald Night #1, was released between The Final Night #3 and #4, which told the events leading to Jordan's appearance in The Final Night #4. Both the Parallax one-shot and the fully colored preview story were later reprinted in the Final Night collected edition, along with the central miniseries.

Week Zero
The Final Night Preview

Week One
The Final Night #1
The Power of Shazam! #20
Sovereign Seven #16
Superman (vol. 2) #117

Week Two
The Final Night #2
The Adventures of Superman #540
Batman #536
Green Arrow (vol. 2) #114
Supergirl (vol. 2) #3

Week Three
The Final Night #3
Action Comics #727
Aquaman (vol. 4) #26
Detective Comics #703
Superboy (vol. 3) #33

Week Four
Parallax: Emerald Night #1
The Flash (vol. 2) #119
Hitman #8
Legion of Super-Heroes (vol. 4) #86
Robin (vol. 4) #35
The Spectre (vol. 3) #47
Superman: The Man of Steel #62
Takion #6

Week Five
The Final Night #4
Green Lantern (vol. 3) #81 (epilogue)

== Awards ==
The story earned the most votes for the Comics Buyer's Guide Fan Awards for Favorite Comic-Book Story and Favorite Limited Series for 1997.
