= Green Lantern: Rebirth =

DC comic book series

- Cover of Green Lantern: Rebirth hardcover collection, art by Ethan Van Sciver.

Publication information
- Publisher: DC Comics
- Schedule: Monthly
- Format: Limited series
- Publication date: December 2004 – July 2005 (Note: July 2005 was the published and shipped book cover-date.)
- No. of issues: 6
- Main character(s): Hal Jordan; Kyle Rayner; John Stewart; Guy Gardner; Ganthet; Kilowog; Green Arrow; Parallax; Sinestro

Creative team
- Written by: Geoff Johns
- Penciller: Ethan Van Sciver
- Inker(s): Ethan Van Sciver (#1 and #6); Prentis Rollins (#2–5); Mick Gray (#5 and #6); Marlo Alquiza (#6)
- Colorist: Moose Baumann

Collected editions
- Hardcover: ISBN 1-4012-0710-3
- Softcover: ISBN 1401204651

Green Lantern: Rebirth is a six-issue monthly American comic book limited series written by Geoff Johns and illustrated by Ethan Van Sciver. Published by DC Comics between October 2004 and May 2005, the series featured characters from throughout the sixty-year history of Green Lantern comics.

The storyline follows the "rebirth" of the Silver Age Green Lantern Hal Jordan as he overcomes fear itself in the form of the cosmic entity Parallax. The series starred various members of the intergalactic police force known as the Green Lantern Corps, Kyle Rayner, John Stewart and Guy Gardner. It revived elements of the Green Lantern mythos including the Guardians of the Universe, Kilowog and the villain Sinestro, while introducing new concepts such as the emotional spectrum. In addition, the GLC power ring's flaw of being unable to directly affect the color yellow is significantly weakened, allowing experienced Corps members to overcome it if they can conquer their fear.

== Background ==
In 1994, DC Comics decided to do away with Hal Jordan, who had been the primary Green Lantern of Earth since his first DC Comics appearance in 1959, and replace him with a new character to carry on the Green Lantern legacy, Kyle Rayner. The storyline, Emerald Twilight, which began in Green Lantern (vol. 3) #48 (January 1994), involved Hal Jordan descending into madness following the complete destruction of his home town, Coast City, by the villain Cyborg Superman. This caused Jordan to become the villain Parallax. Jordan went on a rampage on the planet Oa, the planetary citadel of the Guardians of the Universe, who oversee and administer the Green Lantern Corps. He killed some fellow Green Lanterns who opposed him and all the Guardians save for one, Ganthet. He also destroyed the Central Power Battery, with which all Green Lanterns recharge their power rings, and even killed the renegade former Green Lantern, Sinestro, whom Jordan himself had exposed as a criminal who used his power ring to enslave his planet and whom the Guardians apparently freed from his imprisonment in their Central Power Battery in a failed attempt to stop Jordan. Jordan then attempted to destroy all of existence so that he could recreate it to his liking in the 1994 miniseries and crossover storyline, Zero Hour: Crisis in Time!.

"Emerald Twilight", as scripted by Ron Marz, provoked severe outrage amongst many Green Lantern fans. While retaining Kyle Rayner as the sole remaining Green Lantern, DC responded with more than one attempt to redeem Jordan's image and hopefully placate the irate fans, first in the 1996 storyline The Final Night, in which Jordan sacrificed his life to re-ignite Earth's Sun, and then in the 1999 Day of Judgment miniseries, in which his soul, languishing in Purgatory, was chosen as the newest host for God's "Spirit of Vengeance", known as the Spectre. These attempts, however, failed to placate the fans.

In 2004, following the cancellation of The Spectre (vol. 4) featuring Hal Jordan, and a dropoff in sales of the Green Lantern comic, as well as the character's prominent appearance in the popular DC: The New Frontier, DC decided to return Hal Jordan as a Green Lantern. First, the Green Lantern monthly series was canceled with issue #181 and Geoff Johns was assigned to write Green Lantern: Rebirth, which would pave the way for Jordan's return as a Green Lantern. The series would also answer lingering questions about Jordan's character, as well as reveal the decades-long mystery of why the Green Lantern power rings, the powerful weapons assigned to each Lantern that allow them to conjure virtually any form of matter or energy, were unable to affect anything yellow in color.

Geoff Johns first announced his plans to resurrect Hal Jordan in an April 2004 issue of Wizard, noting that he had been working on the five-issue miniseries for a year and that it was due for an October release. As research for the story, Johns spent time with the test pilot department at Edwards Air Force Base and cleared his facts with a major.

== Plot ==
The Green Lantern of Earth, Kyle Rayner, crashes at Highway Hill on Earth in a spacecraft, mumbling to the two hikers who find him, "It has a name". His power ring begins speaking, "Parallax is coming…"

Several strange and disturbing incidents begin to occur. Hal Jordan, pronouncing judgment on the villain Black Hand, becomes unable to focus clearly, and senses that something is wrong, telling his friend Oliver Queen (a.k.a. Green Arrow), "None of this should have happened. This isn't me. This isn't who I am." Meanwhile, Guy Gardner begins losing control of his Vuldarian shapeshifting abilities. Coast City, long destroyed, suddenly reappears to two pilots flying over it, though the only building that is restored is Hal Jordan's old home.

When confronted, Jordan tells the Justice League that he is not responsible for the restored Coast City. Suddenly, John Stewart goes berserk, attacking the other heroes, his ring now intoning, "Parallax is coming." Meanwhile, at the Justice League Watchtower on the Moon, the emergency power ring that Jordan once gave Green Arrow duplicates itself and flies to Gardner's finger, restoring him as a Green Lantern.

Back at Highway Hill, the extraterrestrial Green Lantern Kilowog appears, and inexplicably attacks Kyle Rayner. However, Ganthet, one of the Guardians of the Universe, appears to stop Kilowog, attempting to protect the coffin, which it is revealed holds the corpse of Hal Jordan. He and Kilowog engage in a fierce battle, and Rayner himself feels something within his ring attempting to take over his will, much as with Stewart and Kilowog. Ganthet teleports Rayner and Jordan's corpse to the Watchtower. Meanwhile, Jordan investigates the appearance of his old apartment building, where he is confronted by the Parallax version of himself, who engages in a battle of wills with the Spirit of Vengeance bonded to Jordan's soul.

It is then that the Spectre explains to Jordan the truth about Parallax, while simultaneously on the Moon, Rayner does so to Queen. Rayner explains that he journeyed to the edge of the universe within Sector 3599, and on the 10th planet from the star Pagallus, the inhabitants told him that Parallax was actually a yellow demonic parasitic entity that was born at the beginning of sentience, feeding on fear, creating terror in anything it came into contact with, and causing entire civilizations to destroy themselves out of paranoia. It was this creature that the Guardians of the Universe imprisoned within the Central Power Battery on Oa, using fear's opposite energy, willpower. Rayner explains that there is an emotional electromagnetic spectrum into which the collective willpower of the universe is collected by the Central Power Battery, and that green willpower is the most pure. Parallax had lain dormant for billions of years, his true nature covered up by the Guardians to prevent anyone from trying to free it, and thus, it had eventually come to be referred to as simply "the yellow impurity". This was the reason why the rings were useless against the color yellow: Parallax weakened its power over the corresponding spectrum, and hence only someone capable of overcoming great fear could master the power ring. The Guardians, therefore, selected only such persons to become Green Lanterns.

At some point in recent history, Parallax was awakened, weak and hungry. It reached out to Jordan through his own ring, spending years influencing him, causing him increasing self-doubt and fear. Parallax's control over Jordan exploded with his grief over the destruction of Coast City. It was Parallax's influence that was responsible for Jordan's subsequent murderous activity. When Jordan destroyed the Central Power Battery, he unknowingly freed Parallax, which grafted itself onto his soul, and suppressed Ganthet's memories of the parasite. It was because Parallax was now free that Kyle Rayner's own ring did not have any weakness against yellow. Following Jordan's sacrifice of his own life during The Final Night storyline (a momentary glimpse of his true personality showing through Parallax's influence), the Spirit of Vengeance drew in Hal's soul in order to eradicate the parasitic Parallax from it.

Green Arrow and Rayner are then attacked by Sinestro, apparently very much alive, who explains that it was he who awakened Parallax during his imprisonment inside the Battery, and that the Sinestro whom Jordan killed was a hard-light construct of Parallax's, created so that his murder would serve as the final stage of Jordan's susceptibility to the impurity in order to break his will.

The Justice League of America, Justice Society, and the Teen Titans arrive in Coast City to attack Parallax, but the entity inhibits their efforts by causing them to feel fear. The Spirit of Vengeance, however, manages to overpower Parallax, and finally removes the parasite from Jordan's soul. Needing a soul to inhabit, Parallax attacks Ganthet, while Jordan's soul is pulled toward the light of the afterlife. Ganthet manages to guide Jordan's soul back to his corporeal body on the Moon. His soul and thoughts clear for the first time in a long time, Jordan emerges from the coffin resurrected as a mortal human again, once again taking his place as a Green Lantern, the white portions of his hair even restored to their original brown. He and Sinestro engage in a fierce battle on the Moon, and across entire star systems. Eventually, Jordan and Rayner force the renegade back into the antimatter universe to which he was first banished. Jordan and Rayner then journey to Coast City, where they, along with John Stewart, Guy Gardner and Kilowog, free Ganthet from Parallax's possession, and imprison the parasite back in the Central Power Battery on Oa. The Guardians then announce that "it is time", referring to rebuild the Green Lantern Corps.

After the battle, Batman remains unconvinced that Jordan was not responsible for his actions as Parallax, but nevertheless decides that the universe "needs a little more light anyway", thus acknowledging that Jordan is back. Hal reestablishes his relationships with his former paramour Carol Ferris, who decides to reopen the Ferris Airfield, and Oliver Queen, who offers to let him stay in his home while Jordan rebuilds his life. Elsewhere, at Belle Reve, Hector Hammond senses Jordan's resurrection, and is delighted and awaiting the opportunity to engage with his foe once more.

== Aftermath ==
Green Lantern: Rebirth fully resurrected Hal Jordan by separating him from both Parallax and the Spectre, to whom he had been bonded since Emerald Twilight. The Spectre, now without a host, was later depicted as unleashing havoc on the world of magic in the Infinite Crisis tie-in miniseries Day of Vengeance. The Green Lantern Corps and the Guardians of the Universe, absent from the Green Lantern comics since Emerald Twilight, were also reintroduced by the writers. Additionally, the source of the Yellow Impurity was caused by Parallax's connection to the Central Battery. The Corps, for the first time in history, could overcome the Yellow Impurity by feeling fear and overcoming it.

Geoff Johns and Dave Gibbons subsequently co-wrote a 2005 five-issue miniseries, Green Lantern Corps: Recharge, which depicted Rayner, Gardner, and Kilowog as they helped the Guardians begin the task of recruiting 7,200 new recruits to repopulate the ranks of the Green Lantern Corps while dealing with a mysterious series of black hole formations that threaten the planet Oa itself.

DC Comics subsequently began a new Green Lantern (vol. 4) monthly series starting with issue #1 (July 2005), starring Hal Jordan as he attempts to rebuild his life, moving to the almost-deserted Coast City, which is slowly being rebuilt. Following through intergalactic space travel, retold origin, redemption, and new discoveries, Hal Jordan's character arc and mythos began to revive over the following issues.

Green Lantern: Rebirth set the stage for both Sinestro Corps War and Blackest Night.

== Reaction ==
The miniseries was a sales success, with the first issue going through four printings, and selling a total of 156,975 copies. The second issue went through two printings, and sold 122,221 copies. The subsequent issues sold 106,523, 108,077, 115,006, and 114,354 copies, respectively. The final issue was ranked #8 in sales, and the #4 selling DC book for that month.

Tony Isabella, reviewing the series in Comics Buyer's Guide #1616 (May 2006), gave it five out of five "Tonys", praising the story's characterization, the book's art, and opining that the explanation of the Parallax Fear Anomaly was "one of the single most brilliant concepts" he had ever seen in a Green Lantern comic book. ShakingThrough.net complimented the story's "many rewarding moments", also naming the Parallax Fear Anomaly. Long time Green Lantern fan and author Jim Smith reviewed several issues in the Shiny Shelf web magazine and opined that the series "demonstrates, in every panel, the futility of endless Silver Age retro [and] is, in a quite meaningful sense, the very epicenter of all that is wrong with contemporary comic books". Sean Ferrell of numbmonkey.com called the story "strong", though opining that it had some flaws, including Van Sciver's art.

The success of Green Lantern: Rebirth led to popular acclaim for the team of Geoff Johns and Ethan Van Sciver, and allowed them to revisit the concept for another classic DC character in 2009's The Flash: Rebirth.

== Collected editions ==
The miniseries was collected into a single volume in November 2005 as a hardcover (ISBN 1401207103) and as a trade paperback in April 2006 (ISBN 1401204651). A new printing of the trade paperback was published in April 2010 with different cover art and previously uncollected material (ISBN 1401227554). DC also released it as part of their DC Comics Absolute Edition series in early 2010.
