= Ethan Van Sciver =

American comic book artist

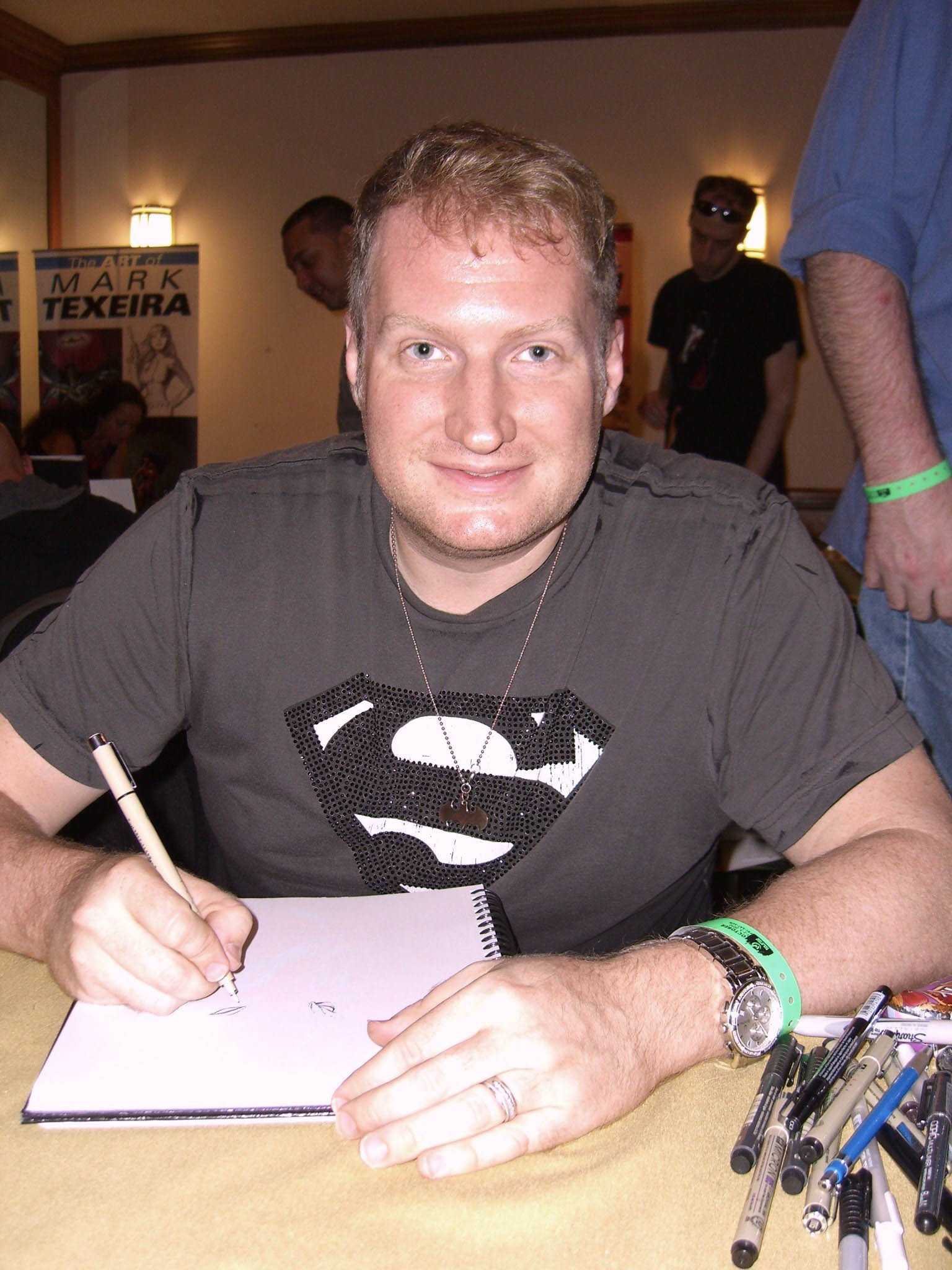
- Van Sciver in October 2010
- Born: Ethan Daniel Van Sciver; September 3, 1974 (age 52) Utah, U.S.
- Areas: Writer, Penciller, Inker
- Notable works: Green Lantern: Rebirth; Sinestro Corps War; The Flash: Rebirth; New X-Men; Cyberfrog

Ethan Daniel Van Sciver (/vænˈskaɪvər/; born September 3, 1974) is an American comics artist. He has done interior and cover art for a number of superhero titles, primarily for DC Comics, including Green Lantern and The Flash: Rebirth, as well as New X-Men for Marvel Comics.

In the late 2010s, his "ComicArtistPro Secrets" channel on YouTube focused on right-wing social commentary, through which he became a central figure in Comicsgate.

== Early life ==
Ethan Van Sciver was born September 3, 1974 in Utah. He and his younger brother, alternative cartoonist Noah Van Sciver, grew up in Merchantville in southern New Jersey, and he graduated from Pennsauken High School in 1992.

Van Sciver decided on a career in the comic-book field after seeing the 1978 film Superman as a child, but only began to read comics intently with John Byrne's The Man of Steel in 1986. He cites Chris Claremont and Jon Bogdanove's Fantastic Four vs. the X-Men (1987) as a strong influence.

== Career ==
While in high school, Van Sciver did various art-related jobs, which included painting murals of Native Americans, drawing caricatures for mall customers, illustrating children's books, and airbrushing t-shirts.

Van Sciver's first comics work was published in 1994, writing and drawing what he later called "a horrible little character called Cyberfrog", published by Hall of Heroes and later Harris Comics.

=== Mainstream publishers ===
His first work for DC Comics was in 1998, which led to him being hired in 1999 as the artist on the series Impulse, with writer Todd Dezago. This was followed in 2001 by the first of what would become several collaborations with writer Geoff Johns, on the superhero-horror one-shot The Flash: Iron Heights.

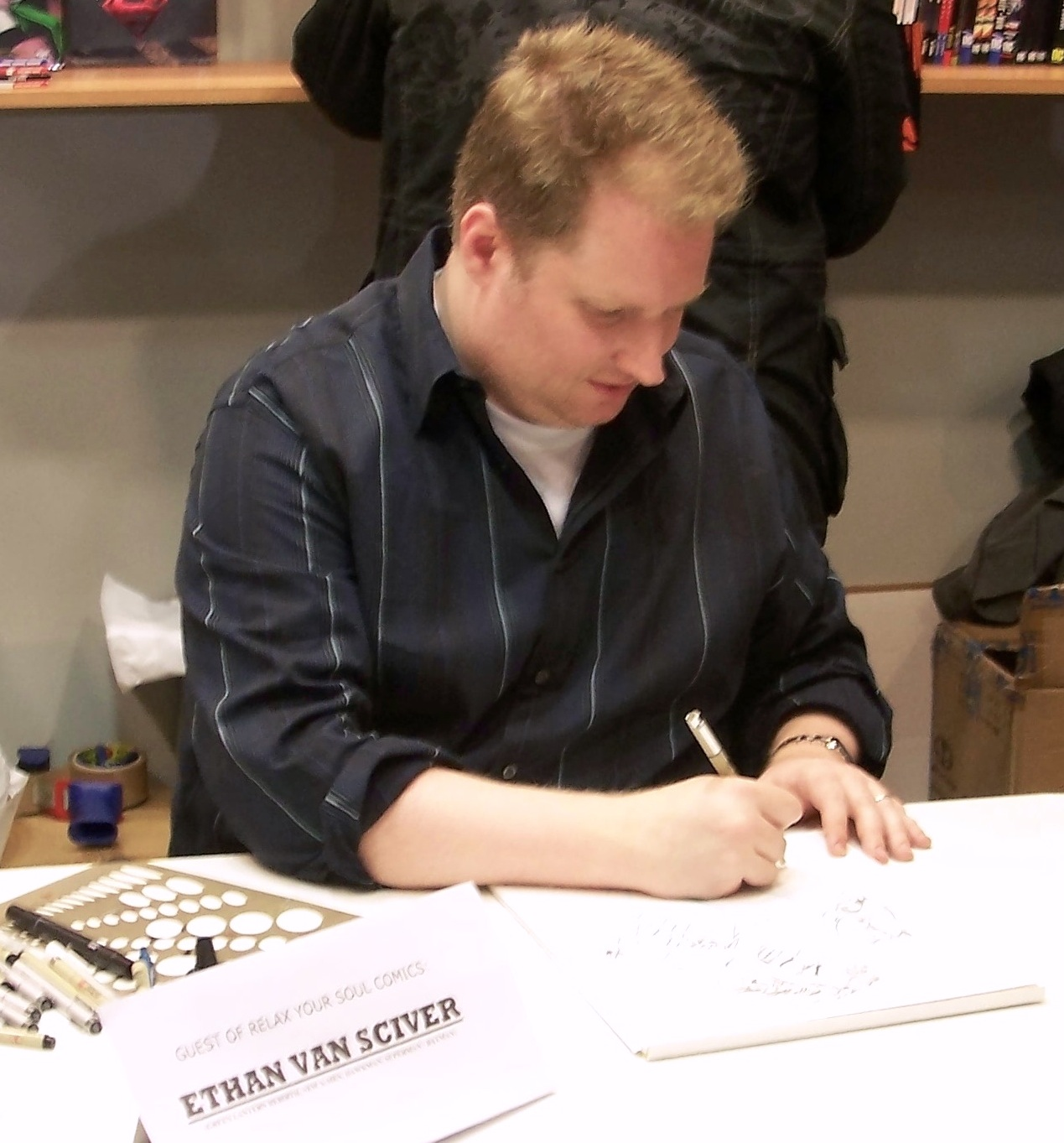
Ethan Van Sciver drawing at Comicon fest, Athens, 2008

Van Sciver was hired by Marvel Comics in 2001 to work on New X-Men, a retitled and revamped series (beginning with #114) written by Grant Morrison. The series' primary artist Frank Quitely was not expected to illustrate the necessary twelve issues per year. As such, Van Sciver was scheduled to illustrate two issues per year, which expanded to more issues as Igor Kordey was also hired as a semi-regular artist. Van Sciver drew a total of four issues. In issue #133 (December 2002) of this series, Morrison and Van Sciver co-created the character Dust, a Sunni Muslim mutant who can transform into sand.

Returning to work primarily for DC, Van Sciver worked with Johns on the six-issue miniseries Green Lantern: Rebirth (2004), which restored the Silver Age character Hal Jordan as the publisher's primary Green Lantern. They then worked together on an ongoing series featuring the character. During this time Van Sciver was one of the artists who contributed to a series of instructional books for amateur comics artists, published by Wizard magazine.

In 2006, Van Sciver penciled the cover art for metal band Winger's fourth studio album. The cover art was also sold as a poster called "Guardian of Freedom".

Johns, Van Sciver, Dave Gibbons, Ivan Reis, and others produced "Sinestro Corps War", a high-profile 11-issue story appearing in DC's two Green Lantern monthly series in 2007. Van Sciver and Johns produced the six-issue mini-series The Flash: Rebirth (2009) which – like the earlier Green Lantern mini-series – reintroduced the Silver Age character Barry Allen as the Flash. The same year, he drew variant covers for DC's crossover storyline Blackest Night. In 2011, as part of DC's "New 52" initiative, he was the artist – and co-writer with Gail Simone – of The Fury of Firestorm: The Nuclear Men. Starting in 2016, as part of the "DC Rebirth" relaunch of DC's titles, Van Sciver drew issues of the Hal Jordan and the Green Lantern Corps series.

Van Sciver received a "special thanks" credit in the films Justice League, Zack Snyder's Justice League, and The Suicide Squad.

=== Independent work ===
In 2017, Van Sciver penciled illustrations for 12 Rules for Life: An Antidote to Chaos, a self-help book by Canadian psychologist and social activist Jordan Peterson. No longer employed by DC, in 2018 Van Sciver announced that he would instead produce his own comics under the name ALL CAPS COMICS, and in 2019 he published Cyberfrog: Bloodhoney featuring his early character Cyberfrog, for which he had raised over $500,000 through crowdfunding. A campaign in 2020 raised over $1 million for a follow-up Cyberfrog: Rekt Planet, promised to ship in 2021.

=== Political commentary and controversies ===
In 2017, Van Sciver began a YouTube channel called ComicArtistPro Secrets, which originally featured demonstrations of illustration tools and techniques, but which later focused on commentary about comics, other comics creators, and fan culture. Through that channel, Van Sciver became a central figure in Comicsgate, a movement whose members oppose what they see as "forced" political themes and anti-consumer practices in current mainstream superhero comics, such as cultural diversity and progressive politics. The movement has been criticized for harassment tactics in online campaigns against those who produce these comics and work in the industry. Van Sciver faced criticism over an announced collaboration with cartoonist Dave Sim, whose views about women have been described by critics as misogynistic. Van Sciver initially defended Sim's past relationship with a 14-year-old girl, likening it to that of Elvis and Priscilla Presley, until he learned more details about Sim's relationship with her, and cancelled the project.

Van Sciver has also been a prominent figure in the Fandom Menace, a Star Wars fan movement with similar goals and methods to Comicsgate. In 2018, Van Sciver expressed his displeasure at the direction that the franchise had taken by producing a video of himself opening and destroying action figures of The Last Jedi character Rose Tico.

In March 2023, Van Sciver publicly criticized actor Pedro Pascal for not having defended his The Mandalorian co-star Gina Carano when Lucasfilm fired her from that series in 2021 over her political comments. During the March 12, 2023, telecast of the 95th Academy Awards, Van Sciver reacted to the appearance of Pascal presenting an award with actress Elizabeth Olsen, by tweeting a screenshot of them with the caption "Oh, it's this asshole. Thanks for standing behind Gina, you flabby coward." The tweet drew backlash from Chilean Twitter users (Pascal being Chilean-American), resulting in thousands of comments critical of Van Sciver's original tweet. Van Sciver responded to this by posting recipes and other phrases in Spanish, and tweeting the following day, "I seem to have pissed off Chile last night. Lmfao. My bad."

== Personal life ==
As of August 2005, Van Sciver resided in Orlando, Florida, where he lived for several years. As of May 2015, he lived in North Carolina; however, he was in the process of moving back to New Jersey to be with his girlfriend Andrea, whom he met when he was 18. Van Sciver is a Republican and former Mormon.

== Awards and recognition ==
- Inkwell Awards Ambassador (2010–2018)
- 2008 Will Eisner Comic Industry Awards – nominee for Best Penciller/Inker for Green Lantern: Sinestro Corps

== Bibliography ==
As artist unless otherwise noted.

=== Non-fiction ===
- 12 Rules for Life: An Antidote to Chaos by Jordan Peterson (2018), illustrations

=== Splatto Comics ===
- Jawbreakers: Lost Souls TPB (2019), cover art
- Jawbreakers: GØD-K1NG TPB (2019), cover art

=== ALL CAPS Comics ===
- Cyberfrog: Bloodhoney (2019), artist and writer
- Cyberfrog: The Diary of Heather Swain (2019), artist and writer
- Cyberfrog: Unfrogettable Tales #1–2 (2020), artist and writer
- Reignbow The Brute (2026), artist and writer
- Cyberfrog #2: Rekt Planet (2023), artist and writer
- Salamandroid: Death's Sting (2023), artist and writer
- Fearsome (2024), writer
- Wrath of H3ll3phant (2024), writer
- Cyberfrog: Dark Harvest (2025), writer
- Cyberfrog: Red Extermination (2026), artist and writer

=== DC Comics ===
- 52 #39, 43 (backup features) (2007–2008)
- 52 Aftermath:The Four Horsemen #1–6 (2008)
- Batman/Catwoman: Trail of the Gun, miniseries, #1–2 (2004)
- Batman and Robin Annual #1 (2013)
- Batman Incorporated Special #1 (2013)
- Batman: The Dark Knight vol. 2 #16–18, 21, 28–29 (2013–2014)
- Batman: The Dawnbreaker, one-shot (2017)
- Convergence #8 (2015)
- Countdown #28 (backup feature) (2007)
- DC Comics Presents: Impulse #1 (2011)
- DC Universe: Rebirth #1 (2016)
- DC Universe: Secret Origins #1 (2012)
- The Flash 80-Page Giant (Impulse) #1 (1998)
- The Flash: Iron Heights (2001)
- The Flash: Rebirth, miniseries, #1–6 (2009–2010)
- Fury of Firestorm: The Nuclear Men #7–8 (co-writer/artist); #1–6, 9–10 (co-writer only) (2012)
- Green Lantern vol. 4 #1 (with Carlos Pacheco); #4–5, 9 (full art); #25 (with Ivan Reis) (2005–2008)
- Green Lantern vol. 5 #20, 43, Annual #1 (2012)
- Green Lantern/New Gods: Godhead #1 (2014)
- Green Lantern: Rebirth, miniseries, #1–6 (2004–2005)
- Green Lantern: Secret Files & Origins (2005)
- Green Lantern: Sinestro Corps Special #1 (2007)
- Green Lantern Corps: Edge of Oblivion, miniseries, #1–3 (2016)
- Green Lanterns: Rebirth, one-shot (2016)
- Hal Jordan and the Green Lantern Corps: Rebirth, one-shot (2016)
- Hal Jordan and the Green Lantern Corps #4–5, 8, 12, 15, 17, 22–25, 32, 38, 42, 45 (2016–2018)
- Hawkman vol. 4 #13 (2003)
- Impulse #41, 50–52, 54–58, 62–63, 65–67 (1998–2000)
- JLA Secret Files #3 (among other artists) (2000)
- Justice League vol. 2 #0 (2012)
- Justice Leagues: JL?, one-shot (2001)
- Justice League of America vol. 2 #20 (2006)
- Justice Society of America #59–64 (2004)
- The New 52: Futures End (Free Comic Book Day) #0 (various artists) (2014)
- Sinestro #15–16 (2015)
- Superman/Batman #28–30 (2006)
- Secret Origins 80-Page Giant (Wonder Girl) #1 (1998)
- Sensation Comics featuring Wonder Woman #1 (2014)
- Untold Tales of Blackest Night #1 (among other artists) (2010)
- War of the Supermen (Free Comic Book Day) #0 (among other artists) (2010)

=== Hall of Heroes ===
- CyberFrog #1–2 (1994), writer/artist
- Fuzzy Buzzard and Friends (April 1995), writer/artist

=== Harris Comics ===
- CyberFrog Vol 2 #0–4 (1996), writer/artist
  - CyberFrog : Censored #1 (1996) one-shot, writer/artist
  - CyberFrog: Reservoir Frog #1–2 (1996) miniseries, writer/artist
  - CyberFrog vs Creed #1 (1997); CyberFrog (co-writer/artist)
  - CyberFrog: 3rd Anniversary #1–2 (1997) Special miniseries, writer/artist
  - CyberFrog: The Origin - Ashcan Preview #1 (1997) one-shot, writer/artist
  - CyberFrog: Amphibionix #1 (1999) one-shot, writer/artist
- Vampirella: Crossover Gallery #1 (1997)
- Vampirella / Shadowhawk: Creatures of the Night (1995) #1

=== Marvel Comics ===
- Heroes Reborn Remnants #1 (2000)
- New X-Men #117–118, 123, 133 (2001–2002)
- Weapon X: The Draft – Wild Child (2002)
- Wolverine #179 (2002)

==== Cover work ====
- Heroes Reborn Remnants #1
- New X-Men TPB By Grant Morrison Ultimate Collection 2
- New X-Men #124–125, 128, 130–131, 134, 146
- Isom #2 Cover B by Rippaverse Comics

=== WildStorm ===
- Claw of the Conquered #1a, 1b (2006–2007) (cover artist)

=== Wizard ===
- Wizard How to Draw - TPB vol. 01 "The Best of Basic Training: Volume 1". Wizard Entertainment. 2005. ISBN 0976287404. (co-writer)
- Wizard How to Draw - TPB vol. 02 "Heroic Anatomy". Wizard Entertainment. 2005. ISBN 0976287455. (co-writer)
- Wizard How to Draw - TPB vol. 03 "Character Creation". Wizard. 2005. ISBN 0976287471. (co-writer)
- Wizard How to Draw - TPB vol. 04 "Storytelling". Wizard Entertainment. 2005. ISBN 0977861309. (co-writer)
