= Green Lantern =

Multiple superheroes from the DC universe

- Cover of Green Lantern: Rebirth #6 (May 2005); Pictured left to right: Guy Gardner, Kyle Rayner, Hal Jordan, John Stewart, and Kilowog. Art by Ethan Van Sciver.
- Publisher: DC Comics
- First appearance: All-American Comics #16 (July 1940)
- Created by: Alan Scott: Martin Nodell; Bill Finger; Hal Jordan: John Broome; Gil Kane
- Characters: Alan Scott; Hal Jordan; Guy Gardner; John Stewart; Kyle Rayner; Simon Baz; Jessica Cruz; Sojourner Mullein
- See also: Green Lantern Corps

Green Lantern is the name of several superheroes appearing in American comic books published by DC Comics. While the original debuted in All-American Comics #16 (July, 1940), the associated characters and core concept have changed significantly over its publication history; while the original concept was tied to a crime-fighting superhero who used the aid of a magic ring, the later concept (existing concurrently to the original) casts a set of characters in a science-fictional element as law enforcement officers.

The original concept is tied to Alan Scott, the original version of the character created in 1940 by Martin Nodell with scripting or co-scripting of the first stories by Bill Finger during the Golden Age. Scott battled common criminals in Capitol City (and later Gotham City) with the aid of his magic ring tied to the force known as Starheart. Over time, Scott's character would be heavily tied to the Justice Society of America and became an inspiration for superheroes in the 21st century. The later concept would take form during the Silver Age onward, depicting characters with the name as members (chiefly those from Earth) of the Green Lantern Corps, an intergalactic law enforcement agency that fights the forces of evil with the aid of rings ("power rings") that grant a variety of extraordinary powers, all of which come from imagination, fearlessness, and the electromagnetic spectrum of emotional willpower. The concept was first explored during the Silver Age by John Broome and Gil Kane with Hal Jordan, a test pilot granted the Green Lantern Corps' power ring upon the death of alien Green Lantern Abin Sur, and inherits his position as the Green Lantern in charge of Earth and becomes legendary over time.

Decades later, other characters are introduced with the title; Guy Gardner was the next character associated with the name, characterized as a staunch defender with a more abrasive, stubborn personality and a rebellious reputation. John Stewart was the fourth character to use the name, and is one of the highest-profile African-American superheroes; originally chosen as an alternative for Hal Jordan, his distinctive service marked the character as legendary. In the 1990s, Kyle Rayner, depicted as a struggling Mexican-American artist, became the fifth character to use the name when he was granted the ring following the initial destruction of the Green Lantern Corps by Jordan; he is characterized as more ordinary, but his constructs are more elaborate and intricate due to his artistic background.

In the 2010s, Simon Baz is the sixth character known as Green Lantern. A Lebanese-American, Muslim, and former mechanic chosen as a Green Lantern, Baz develops a precognitive power that is rare among the Corps. Joining concurrently and partnered with Baz in the 2010s, Jessica Cruz is the seventh character introduced overall. A Mexican-American who suffered from crippling anxiety and depression, she was host to an alternate version of the power ring that chose those who succumbed to fear, but eventually broke free of it and eventually was made a Green Lantern. In the 2020s, Sojourner "Jo" Mullein, a bisexual African-American woman, was introduced as the eighth character. She is assigned to the Far Sector and is among the Corps' best investigators.

The Green Lanterns are among DC Comics' longest-lasting sets of characters. They have been adapted to television, video games, and motion pictures.

== Publication history ==
=== Golden Age ===
Martin Nodell (initially using the pen-name Mart Dellon) created the first Green Lantern in collaboration with Bill Finger. He first appeared in the Golden Age of Comic Books in All-American Comics #16 (July 1940), published by All-American Publications, one of three companies that would eventually merge to form DC Comics.

This Green Lantern's real name was Alan Scott, a railroad engineer who, after a railway crash, came into possession of a magic lantern which spoke to him and said it would bring power. From this, he crafted a magic ring that gave him a wide variety of powers. The limitations of the ring were that it had to be "charged" every 24 hours by touching it to the lantern for a time and that it could not directly affect objects made of wood. Alan Scott fought mostly ordinary human villains, but he did have a few paranormal ones such as the immortal Vandal Savage and the zombie Solomon Grundy. Most stories took place in New York. Green Lantern rings are made from magic.

As a popular character in the 1940s, the Green Lantern featured both in anthology books such as All-American Comics and Comic Cavalcade, as well as his own book, Green Lantern. He also appeared in All Star Comics as a member of the superhero team known as the Justice Society of America.

After World War II the popularity of superheroes in general declined. The Green Lantern comic book was cancelled with issue #38 (May–June 1949), and All Star Comics #57 (1951) was the character's last Golden Age appearance. When superheroes came back in fashion in later decades, the character Alan Scott was revived, but he was forever marginalized by the new Hal Jordan character who had been created to supplant him (see below). Initially, he made guest appearances in other superheroes' books, but eventually had regular roles in books featuring the Justice Society. He never had another solo series, although he did star in individual stories and in the single-issue 2002 comic book Brightest Day, Blackest Night. Between 1995 and 2003, DC Comics changed Alan Scott's superhero codename to "Sentinel" in order to distinguish him from the newer and more popular science fictional Green Lanterns.

In 2011, the Alan Scott character was revamped. His costume was redesigned to be all green and the source of his powers was changed to that of the mystical power of nature (referred to in the stories as "the Green").

=== Silver Age ===
In 1959, Julius Schwartz reinvented the Green Lantern character as a science fiction hero named Hal Jordan. Hal Jordan's powers were more or less the same as Alan Scott's, but otherwise this character was completely different from the Green Lantern character of the 1940s. He had a new name, a redesigned costume, and a rewritten origin story. Hal Jordan received his ring from a dying alien and was commissioned as an officer of the Green Lantern Corps, an interstellar law enforcement agency overseen by the Guardians of the Universe.

Hal Jordan was introduced in Showcase #22 (September–October 1959). Gil Kane and Sid Greene were the art team most notable on the title in its early years, along with writer John Broome. His initial physical appearance, according to Kane, was patterned after his one-time neighbor, actor Paul Newman.

=== Later developments ===
With issue #76 (April 1970), the series made a radical stylistic departure. Editor Schwartz, in one of the company's earliest efforts to provide more than fantasy, worked with the writer-artist team of Denny O'Neil and Neal Adams to spark new interest in the comic book series and address a perceived need for social relevance. They added the character Green Arrow (with the cover, but not the official name, retitled Green Lantern Co-Starring Green Arrow) and had the pair travel through America encountering "real world" issues, to which they reacted in different ways — Green Lantern as fundamentally a lawman, Green Arrow as a liberal iconoclast. Additionally during this run, the groundbreaking "Snowbirds Don't Fly" story was published (issues #85–86) in which Green Arrow's teen sidekick Speedy (the later grown-up hero Red Arrow) developed a heroin addiction that he was forcibly made to quit. The stories were critically acclaimed, with publications such as The New York Times, The Wall Street Journal, and Newsweek citing it as an example of how comic books were "growing up". However, the O'Neil/Adams run was not a commercial success, and the series was cancelled after only 14 issues, though an additional unpublished three installments were finally published as back-ups in The Flash #217–219.

The title saw a number of revivals and cancellations. It changed to Green Lantern Corps at one point as the popularity rose and waned. During a time there were two regular titles, each with a Green Lantern, and a third member in the Justice League. A new character, Kyle Rayner, was created to become the feature while Hal Jordan first became the villain Parallax, then died and came back as the Spectre.

In the wake of The New Frontier, writer Geoff Johns returned Hal Jordan as Green Lantern in Green Lantern: Rebirth (2004–05). Johns began to lay the groundwork for "Blackest Night" (released July 13, 2010)), viewing it as the third part of the trilogy started by Rebirth. Expanding on the Green Lantern mythology in the second part, "Sinestro Corps War" (2007), Johns, with artist Ethan Van Sciver, found wide critical acclaim and commercial success with the series, which promised the introduction of a spectrum of colored "lanterns".

=== Awards ===
The series and its creators have received several awards over the years, including the 1961 Alley Award for Best Adventure Hero/Heroine with Own Book and the Academy of Comic Book Arts Shazam Award for Best Continuing Feature in 1970, for Best Individual Story ("No Evil Shall Escape My Sight", Green Lantern (vol. 2) #76 by Dennis O'Neil and Neal Adams), and in 1971 for Best Individual Story ("Snowbirds Don't Fly", Green Lantern (vol. 2) #85 by O'Neil and Adams).

Writer O'Neil received the Shazam Award for Best Writer (Dramatic Division) in 1970 for his work on Green Lantern, Batman, Superman and other titles, while artist Adams received the Shazam for Best Artist (Dramatic Division) in 1970 for his work on Green Lantern and Batman. Inker Dick Giordano received the Shazam Award for Best Inker (Dramatic Division) for his work on Green Lantern and other titles.

In Judd Winick's first regular writing assignment on Green Lantern, he wrote a storyline in which an assistant of Kyle Rayner's emerged as a gay character in Green Lantern (vol. 3) #137 (June 2001). In Green Lantern (vol. 3) #154 (November 2001) the story entitled "Hate Crime" gained media recognition when his friend Terry Berg was brutally beaten in a homophobic attack. Winick was interviewed on Phil Donahue's show on MSNBC for that storyline on August 15, 2002 and received two GLAAD Media Awards for his Green Lantern work.

In May 2011, Green Lantern placed 7th on IGN's Top 100 Comic Book Heroes of All Time.

=== Legal disputes ===
DC Comics has been involved in two disputes concerning Green Lantern trade marks before the United States Patent and Trade Mark Office, the first in 2012 and the second in 2016.

== Characters ==
=== Golden Age Green Lantern ===
- Alan Scott

=== Silver Age Green Lanterns ===
- Hal Jordan
- Guy Gardner

=== Bronze Age Green Lantern ===
- John Stewart

=== Modern Age Green Lanterns ===
- Kyle Rayner
- Simon Baz
- Jessica Cruz
- Keli Quintela
- Sojourner Mullein

=== Others who have headlined as Green Lantern in a Green Lantern comic book or related title ===
- Jade
- Sinestro
- Jediah Caul
- Tai Pham
- Jong Li

== Powers and abilities ==
Each Green Lantern wears a ring that grants them a variety of abilities. The ring is powered by willpower. The full extent of the ring's abilities has never been rigorously defined in the stories, but two consistent traits are that it grants the power of flight and that all of its effects are accompanied by a green light.

== Green Lantern Oath ==
In issue #9 (fall 1943) of the original Alan Scott Green Lantern comic book, scriptwriter Alfred Bester, best known as a major science fiction novelist of the 1950s (and one who had included rhymed couplets in his work) introduced the Green Lantern Oaths:

In brightest day, in blackest night
No evil shall escape my sight!
Let those who worship evil's might
Beware my power ― Green Lantern's light!

This oath was revived for the Hal Jordan version of the character. Alan Moore and Geoff Johns introduced variants. Oftentimes "blackest night" is changed to "darkest night". The oath inspired the name of the crossover event Blackest Night. In reference to the oath, the sequel to Blackest Night was called Brightest Day.

== In other media ==
=== Film ===
==== Standalone film ====
Hal Jordan made his live-action debut in the 2011 film Green Lantern, portrayed by Ryan Reynolds. The film originally intended on launching a new DC Comics cinematic franchise with a sequel and an untitled Flash film, but due to the film's failure, nothing moved forward.

==== DC Extended Universe ====
John Stewart was scheduled to appear in the HBO Max film Zack Snyder's Justice League, portrayed by Wayne T. Carr, but the scene was reworked with Martian Manhunter, portrayed by Harry Lennix, at the request of Warner Bros.

==== DC Universe ====
Nathan Fillion was cast as Guy Gardner in the 2025 film Superman and its 2027 sequel Man of Tomorrow as part of the soft-rebooted DC Universe. Aaron Pierre will appear in Man of Tomorrow as John Stewart.

=== Television ===
In the live-action television series Stargirl, Alan Scott's power battery is shown in a flashback to when the Injustice Society attacked the Justice Society of America's headquarters. JSA member Pat Dugan hid his power battery in his basement. In the second season, Alan Scott's daughter Jennie-Lynn Scott finds Alan's power battery and activates it. She absorbs the battery's energy and breaks it. She then leaves Blue Valley to find her missing brother Todd Rice.

==== DC Universe ====
A live-action Green Lantern television series was announced to be in development at HBO Max set to feature the Alan Scott, Guy Gardner, Jessica Cruz, and Simon Baz versions of Green Lantern along with an original character Bree Jarta with Finn Wittrock and Jeremy Irvine portraying Gardner and Scott respectively. The series was planned to be set in multiple time periods focusing on a separate story for each of the Green Lanterns for that time. The series' title was revealed to be Lanterns in January 2023. The version with Berlanti was confirmed to have been cancelled, with Lanterns focusing on John Stewart and Hal Jordan as part of DC Studios' DC Universe (DCU).

Nathan Fillion makes a short appearance in the second season of the DCU's Peacemaker as Gardner.

In October 2024, Kyle Chandler and Aaron Pierre were cast as the DCU's Jordan and Stewart. Lanterns premiered on HBO on August 16, 2026. Gardner also has a guest role in the series, again played by Fillion.

== In academic and journalistic jargon ==
Some political pundits and academic political scientists use the phrase "Green Lanternism" (or "political Green Lanternism") to refer to the common tendency to demand perfection or omnipotence from political leaders, and to blame actually unsolvable or inevitable problems on political leaders' alleged weakness or malice, as if political office-holders' powers and abilities, like Green Lantern's powers and abilities, were limited only by their personal strength of will.

== See also ==
- Doctor Spectrum, a Marvel Comics pastiche of Green Lantern
- Green Lantern: The Animated Series
- Green Lantern Corps
