= Forever Evil: Blight =

DC Comics storyline

- Publisher: DC Comics
- Publication date: October 2013 – March 2014
- Genre: Crossover
Title(s)
- Constantine #9-12
- Justice League Dark #24-29
- Trinity of Sin: Pandora #6-9
- Trinity of Sin: The Phantom Stranger #14-17
- Main characters: Justice League Dark; John Constantine; Swamp Thing; Nightmare Nurse; Pandora; Phantom Stranger

Creative team
- Writer(s): J. M. DeMatteis, Ray Fawkes
- Artist(s): Aco, Fernando Blanco, Mikel Janin, Francis Portela, Beni Lobel, Staz Johnson, Vincente Cifuentes, Guillermo Ortego, Jordi Tarragona, Miguel Sepulveda
- Justice League Dark Volume 4: The Rebirth of Evil: ISBN 978-1401247256

"Forever Evil: Blight" is a 2013–2014 crossover storyline published by DC Comics that began in October 2013, set within the larger "Forever Evil" storyline. The story, which is seen in the series Constantine, Justice League Dark, Trinity of Sin: Pandora, and Trinity of Sin: The Phantom Stranger, sees John Constantine, Swamp Thing, Nightmare Nurse, Pandora, and the Phantom Stranger attempt to defeat Blight, who is the manifestation of evil itself, and rescue the missing members of the Justice Leagues. The announcement of "Forever Evil: Blight" promised changes to the status quo for the titles involved at its conclusion, with each having major changes.

== Synopsis ==
Following the events of the "Trinity War", Constantine awakes in the House of Mystery, unsure of how he got there. He slowly begins to remember gaining control of Pandora's Box, and then the Crime Syndicate defeating the three Justice Leagues. He attempts to conjure an enchantment to find Zatanna and the other members of the Justice League Dark. It does not work, but the House begins to transport Constantine around, and at each stop, he sees the shadow of evil grow into a blight on humanity. He is returned to the House where he sees a conjured Zatanna from his conscious, who reveals that Pandora's Box is still having an adverse effect on him. The conjuring is revealed to be Nightmare Nurse, who sought out Constantine to remove the remnants of the Box from him. She also reveals that she has grown her own, blue, female, Swamp Thing to help in Constantine's mission to find his team. The blue Swamp Thing does not survive for long, and gives birth to Alec Holland's green Swamp Thing. Swamp Thing agrees to help, as the Green has been agitated by the Crime Syndicates arrival. The three try to track the missing members of the Justice League, but are blocked by magical toxins. Constantine realizes that the group is going to need to confront evil head on to get past the toxins, and they set out to enter their collective unconscious. The group confronts Blight, who proves too much for them to handle, with Constantine barely escaping with the others back to the House of Mystery. Constantine secludes himself, hoping to find more power to aid them against Blight. He determines that the Trinity of Sin are the ones who will be able to help them, and summons them to the Rock of Eternity. Elsewhere, Sea King, seemingly killed from the journey from Earth-3, awakens at the bottom of the ocean.

Meanwhile, Pandora is seen traveling to Earth-3, after the Outsider opens the portal with her box, and encounters the Martian Manhunter's counterpart. Back on Prime Earth, she attempts to reconstruct her box, and seeks answers from the Outsider at the Justice League's Watchtower. The Outsider points out that she is asking him the wrong type of questions. He reveals that the Seven Deadly Sins, supposedly released when she touched the box, would have appeared on Prime Earth no matter what, meaning the Council of Eternity cursed her for no reason. The Outsider blows up the Watchtower as Pandora teleports away. She appears at the Rock of Eternity, having been summoned by Constantine along with the Phantom Stranger and the Question. The Trinity of Sin are able to get out of their chains, and the Phantom Stranger is able to break the construct Constantine created, revealing they are actually in the House of Mystery. The Phantom Stranger peers into Constantine's mind and sees his, Swamp Thing's and Nightmare Nurse's failed attempt to defeat Blight. The Question does not decide to help and vanishes, while Pandora agrees to help. Constantine coaxes Phantom Stranger to join by offering him one of his pieces of silver. Phantom Stranger declines, and tries to leave the House. He wanders through it, and after seeing various moments of his past, returns to the others, and tells Constantine he will help their cause. Elsewhere, Chris Esperanza, the Phantom Stranger's friend he brought back from the dead, overcome by his emotional turmoil of being resurrected, awakens Blight inside of him, allowing his body to become the vessel for Blight. Now in his vessel, Blight summons Constantine, Swamp Thing, Nightmare Nurse, Phantom Stranger and Pandora to his location in New York City.

Arriving in New York, the group is attacked by Blight. The Phantom Stranger realizes Blight is using his friend Chris as a host. Nightmare Nurse teleports the group away to regroup. As they teleport, they get a glimpse of two people talking about a "project" that involves a captured Sargon being used as a test subject. Only able to teleport to Central Park, the group tries to free Chris from Blight. Just as they are about to destroy it, Blight knocks back the group. Pandora sees Blight heading for Constantine, and she is able to jump in front of it and extract Chris from the Blight. Pandora fights off the Sins while Blight joins with Chris once again. Blight breathes fire at the Justice League Dark, who are able to resist it, before he does the same to the buildings in New York. Swamp Thing, Phantom Stranger and Nightmare Nurse rescue the people in the affected buildings and move them to safety. Constantine realizes they have been on the defensive, and they should move to the offensive. He asks Nightmare Nurse to mark the group with the Mark of Dun-Kon-Wen. Pandora begins shooting at Blight, only for Blight to start killing each member, killing Pandora last. As she dies, she is approached by Nightmare Nurse in her subconscious, letting her know this is the result of the Dun-Kon-Wen, and they have a plan so they all remain sane. It is shown that the group's bodies have ended up in Doctor Thirteen's apartment.

While floating in the subconscious, Constantine sees Deadman, who tells him he is the only hope the former Justice League Dark members have to survive. Nightmare Nurse is able to revive everyone with her psyche, when Constantine informs them of his visit from Deadman. They determine that it actually was him, not a delusion, and Constantine, Nightmare Nurse, Swamp Thing and Pandora set out to find him. They travel to the bottom of the ocean, where they arrive at Nan Madol, a deserted undersea kingdom. There, Sea King begins to attack them and awakens the spirits of Nan Madol to attack the surface. Pandora informs Constantine that they have to stop him, as the Sea King is housing Deadman's spirit. On the surface, the group is able to stop Sea King's attack, and break the connection Sea King's body had on Deadman. Deadman wakes up and informs the group he jumped into Sea King's body during the Crime Syndicate's arrival, and that it twisted his mind so he did not know how he was. Constantine removes the last traces of Sea King's consciousness and locks Deadman in the body to have a weapon to use against the Crime Syndicate. Elsewhere, Phantom Stranger took Doctor Thirteen to Chris Esperanza's house, where Blight had captured Chris' family. The Presence appears to the Stranger and tells him he should join Blight in order to continue on his path to redemption. He does and sacrifices Doctor Thirteen as well. However, seeing Chris' sister talk to Blight, Phantom Stranger sees the innocent boy rising up, and betrays Blight, freeing Doctor Thirteen and Chris' family. Phantom Stranger sees the love that still exists in Chris and uses it to expel Blight from Chris. However, Chris rejoins with Blight, saying he was the one to choose Blight, not the reverse, and becomes stronger. Phantom Stranger returns to the House of Mystery to tell the others, where he suggests the group goes to Heaven to ask the Presence to aid in their quest. Elsewhere, Felix Faust and Nick Necro are seen torturing Mindwarp for Ultraman, eventually killing him, in an attempt to create rechargeable specimens, having previously experimented with Sargon.

At the border of Heaven, the group is confronted by the Spectre and Zauriel. The Spectre begins attacking the group before being stopped by the Presence. The Presence begins to show them the understanding they each seek. After refusing and declining to continue to see his understanding, the Presence shows Constantine the rest of the groups'. Constantine then flees, making Zauriel chase after him. They arrive at the House of Mystery, where Constantine traps Zauriel in a celestial circle, in hopes he will help them fight Blight. He tells the others that the trip was a waste, as he only saw why he could not trust any of the group. The others, however, saw the truth or good remaining in their hearts, which Zauriel confirms, as he agrees to help them fight. The House of Mystery travels to Blight's location, where the group prepares to fight him once more. Before the fight, Pandora recalls what she heard in Heaven from the Presence, that it was the question "What are you?" Thinking about it, she realizes she does not know, as she is no longer like the person she was. Remembering her past, she recalls all the "lights" she witnessed while searching for the sins of the world, and realizes she is one of them. Pandora heads straight for Blight and engages him directly, knowing she has the light and hope to defeat him. After a large explosion, Pandora emerges, having now been embodied by the light, realizes her true purpose, and uses the light to destroy Blight and once again free Chris. Phantom Stranger catches him, only for Chris to once again reembody Blight and kill the Phantom Stranger. Pandora engages Blight once more and pushes him back to the bottom of the ocean.

Zauriel proceeds to attack Blight, before being defeated as well. He joins Phantom Stranger and Pandora in the collective unconscious, as both created the illusion that they died. The group finds the human, Chris, located within Blight's heart. When Pandora tries to free him as a way to weaken Blight, she is stopped by Zauriel. Telling the two that there are bigger plans for Chris, Zauriel continues to fight a part of Blight as the Phantom Stranger and Pandora work to help Chris. Back in the material world, Deadman and Swamp Thing distract Blight as Constantine and Nightmare Nurse conjure the Blackmare Curse, to unleash their personal "blights". In doing so, they attempt to fight evil with evil and are able to weaken Blight before Nightmare Nurse stops Constantine from killing Blight to save Chris, reverting to their normal selves. As Blight begins to merge the conscious with the unconscious, a bright light envelops him and he disappears. In his place, a transformed Chris appears in his true nature - the embodied spirit of redemption. He states that with the help of Constantine's group, he was able to lock Blight back in the collective unconscious, and sets out to begin redeeming the world. With Blight gone, so is the psychic static that originally prevented Constantine from finding Zatanna and the others, and he is able to locate them.

=== Project Thaumaton ===
Back at the House of Mystery, Nightmare Nurse is tending to Constantine, who is suffering from adverse side effects from the Blackmare Curse. In order to find the location of the Justice Leagues, Phantom Stranger attempts to accelerate Constantine's recovery by taking himself and Nightmare Nurse into one of Constantine's memories. There, the Phantom Stranger forces Constantine to use the light in himself to fight off his personal demons, which cures him. Constantine combines his magic with Pandora's and they are able to locate the Justice League members in Nanda Parbat. Once there, Deadman in Sea King's body is able to gain entrance to the temples, where the group realizes that Felix Faust and Nick Necro are behind the operation. Under a concealment spell, the group follows Deadman further into the temple to try and rescue the Justice Leagues. Deadman is show around the facility by Necro and Faust and learns the intent of the project. Necro realizes that Deadman is hiding in Sea King's body and Faust is able to neutralize him. Knowing that the other members would have followed him, Faust activates security measures for the project. Once inside, the group activates the defense spells put in place by Necro and Faust. Constantine is separated from the rest except for Nightmare Nurse. Pandora, still with the others, surrenders to Necro and Faust and willingly gets placed in a Thaumaton Wheel. Constantine and Nightmare Nurse travel further through the temple, where they eventually come across the other mystics being held for the project Necro and Faust has been working on. They see Black Orchid, Cassandra Craft, Shade, the Changing Man, Enchantress, Blackbriar Thorn, Blue Devil, Papa Midnite, Sargon and Zatanna being held for the use in the Crime Syndicate's weapons program to use against the entity that destroyed their world. Constantine realizes that Nightmare Nurse is not herself, actually Necro in disguise. The two fight and Constantine is able to stop Necro in order to try and free Zatanna. Before he is able to, he is captured by Faust. Constantine hopes the rest of his team will help him, not realizing that they have been captured too to be used for the project. Nightmare Nurse gets loaded into the machine, and is able to survive the blast. However, she becomes severely burned in the process. Pandora volunteers to be the next test subject, and is loaded into the machine. Once they are about to begin the test, she transforms into the Light being, and is able to destroy the machines. Necro and Faust attempt to stabilize the location before it blows, while Pandora teleports the mystics away. However, she is only able to teleport the Phantom Stranger and Cassandra Craft, leaving the others stranded.

Necro and Faust use Zauriel to stop the impending explosion, with Faust then ripping Zauriel's wings off. Constantine and Zatanna enter "The Between" to talk, before being interrupted by Necro. Necro tries to get the two to join him, asking him if they ever questioned if Thaumaton had a higher purpose. Refusing, Necro sends them back to the conscious world, where they have been placed in a machine that Necro consistently detonates through their bodies, before being stopped by Faust. Elsewhere, the Phantom Stranger, Pandora and Cassandra travel to New York to find Chris Esperanza to help them with his new powers, only to be stopped by the Spectre. Phantom Stranger is able to knock back the Spectre, and ends up going to Las Vegas with Pandora and Cassandra to meet the sons of Trigon. Phantom Stranger attempts to recruit them to their cause in defeating Necro and Faust, but they do not agree with the terms. The group attempts to escape, but are unable to leave. The Phantom Stranger agrees to give his coins to Belial, who cannot handle the guilt and suffering attached to them. The sons of Trigon agree to join the fight, as the group heads back to Nanda Parbat.

Necro looks into the future and sees the Crime Syndicate's threat attacking the project and it failing. He releases Constantine from his wheel and proceeds to inhabit Deadman and attack Constantine. Constantine holds him off, as Necro proceeds to inhabit Swamp Thing. Constantine is able to use Necro's magic to travel through the Green to get to his location, only for Necro to send Constantine to hell, as Swamp Thing begins destroying the complex. As Constantine falls to hell, Zauriel is able to rescue him. Faust attempts to regain control of the situation by using a spell that puts all of the world's secrets in his mind, and allows him to use his prisoner's magic. Pandora and the others arrive, and proceed to free Nightmare Nurse and the others in captivity. Nightmare Nurse heals Deadman, while Constantine finds Zatanna. The released magicians and mages begin to question if Faust is right in keeping Project Thaumaton alive. Faust begins to restore the project and tells Pandora she is not a human from this universe. Just as Faust is about to rebuild the project, Constantine hits him over the head to knock him out. With Faust knocked out, the Justice League Dark fight the sons of Trigon. Nanda Parbat begins to fight back as well, shifting the mystical place into another dimension. Zatanna is able to keep everyone from getting taken along as well. Later, Zatanna goes to the House of Mystery, having now become its owner, and the new leader of Justice League Dark.

== Titles ==
The 18-part storyline includes the following titles:

- Constantine #9-12
- Justice League Dark #24-29
- Trinity of Sin: Pandora #6-9
- Trinity of Sin: The Phantom Stranger #14-17

Trinity of Sin: Pandora #4-5 and Trinity of Sin: The Phantom Stranger #12-13 tie into "Forever Evil" as well, but are not a part of the "Forever Evil: Blight" storyline. The issues act as a prelude to "Blight" and feature elements that pick up after "Trinity War".

== Reception ==
Constantine

Constantine #10 received a 3 out of 10 from Newsarama's Rob McMonigal. He said, "The NuJustice League Dark team travels to Heaven but the story is stuck in limbo as this Forever Evil crossover feels very much like filler. This is exactly what fans feared when John moved to the mainstream DCU, with Constantine stuck participating in things that even he doesn’t want to do, as dialogued by Ray Fawkes. This felt like a way to introduce the new anti-heroes to an unfamiliar reader picking up a tie-in, with pages spent having “God” explain their nature to an uncaring Constantine. Guest artist Beni Lobel misses a chance to make it visually interesting, opting for a realistic style in a supernatural environment. The art is technically perfect, but lacks punch or impact, making this an issue readers should probably skip." Issue 11 received a 7.8 out of 10 from IGN's Jesse Schedeen, saying, "At the end of the day, "Forever Evil: Blight" is really a John Constantine story, and never is that fact more obvious than within Constantine's own book. But that's hardly a bad thing. It's been an uphill battle for DC to reestablish Constantine as a DC Universe character rather than a Vertigo one, but Blight has helped in that process. Constantine #11 in particular does a great job of illustrating who Constantine is, how he thinks and feels and suffers, and how he relates to the many other mystical heroes and villains of the DCU. On that basis alone, it's easy enough to forgive this crossover its faults."

Justice League Dark

Justice League Dark #24 received a 7.2 out of 10 from IGN's Jesse Schedeen. He felt writer "DeMatteis has a reasonably engaging debut on the book. This issue excels as it uses Constantine as a mouthpiece to explore the nature of evil, deconstructing the claims in "Trinity War" that evil is a tangible thing that be loosed on the world or contained in a box. But DeMatteis' writing is often too wordy, especially when it comes to the narration [and his] Constantine is a bit mixed in his execution. In a general sense he reads very much like the shifty, conflicted magician we know, but his British accent and mannerisms are even more downplayed than they have been of late." Doug Zawisza of Comic Book Resources, gave the issue 4.5 stars out of 5, saying, "While Justice League Dark #24 is short on panel appearances by Deadman, Frankenstein, Madame Xanadu, Black Orchid and Zatanna, the comic book doesn't suffer for it. John Constantine is given a chance to re-familiarize himself with readers as the House of Mystery is explored throughout the issue. By the end, Constantine has settled on a mission and begins to assemble a team. The decisions he makes along the way and influential forces provide a strong issue and continue to make "Justice League Dark" an enjoyable read," while praising the creative team for their work. Rob McMonigal of Newsarama gave the issue a 9 out 10, saying, "Constantine’s worst foe - himself - is on display in this psychological tie-in to the events of Forever Evil that shows off the best of J.M. DeMatteis’ writing abilities. [Mikel] Janin does everything right here, from the Chibi Constantines to visualizing the concept of evil as a steadily growing cloud. This is how to do a crossover issue right."

Issue 25 received a 7.7 out of 10 from Schedeen. He stated, "Blight seems to be off to a solid start as well, though the fact that this issue is at its weakest when it directly sets up the crossover with the three other series is a bit worrisome." He added, "The core villain of this story may be generic, but the overall conflict does feel like a relevant and worthwhile addition to Forever Evil - sort of Day of Vengeance to Forever Evil's Infinite Crisis." Schedeen gave issue 26 a 7.3 out of 10, with him saying, "This issue doesn't address the major problem of this storyline. Blight remains a one-note, generic villain full of bluster and bravado and not much else. Even the notion that Blight has a human host does little to inject him with personality or a deeper connection to our heroes. But the final twist in this issue hints that the conflict might be moving in a better direction on that front." He also added that the reintroduction of Sea King was "a fun addition to the book that helps spice up the conflict." Zawisza gave the issue 3 out of 5 stars, saying, "Wrapping up the first third of this eighteen-part crossover, Justice League Dark #26 has some nice, entertaining moments that showcase the imaginative collaboration of DeMatteis and Janin, such as the moss-backed whale form that Swamp Thing utilizes as the team's undersea transportation. Even in the heart of a crossover, Justice League Dark remains one of the most consistently enjoyable comics on my pull list as DeMatteis provides a template for future writers to use when constructing their own installments of widespread crossovers. This isn't the most memorable issue of this series, but it is an informative issue for both the "Blight" crossover and "Forever Evil.""

Trinity of Sin: Pandora

Trinity of Sin: Pandora #6, the first issue that was a part of the "Blight" storyline, received a 7.6 out of 10 from IGN's Jesse Schedeen. He said, "Pandora #6 offers another solid entry in the "Forever Evil: Blight" crossover," and "One way this crossover is already benefiting this series in particular is in creating a sense of real danger for Pandora [as] Pandora always came across as an invulnerable heroine with no real weaknesses or loved ones to get in the way."

=== Sales ===
Justice League Dark #24 ranked 449 in Diamond Comic Distributors' Top 500 Comic Books of 2013. Justice League Dark #29 ranked 70 for March 2014, while Constantine #12, Trinity of Sin: Pandora #9, and Trinity of Sin: The Phantom Stranger #17, each ranked 111, 125 and 129, respectively.

== Collected editions ==
- Forever Evil: Blight (collects Constantine #9–12, Justice League Dark #24–29, Trinity of Sin: Pandora #6–9, Trinity of Sin: The Phantom Stranger Vol. 4 #14–17, 400 pages, paperback, September 24, 2014)
- Constantine Volume 2: Blight (collects Constantine #7–12, 144 pages, paperback, August 6, 2014)
- Justice League Dark Volume 4: The Rebirth of Evil (collects Justice League Dark #22-29, 208 pages, paperback, August 20, 2014, ISBN 978-1401247256)
- Trinity of Sin: Pandora Volume 2 (collects Trinity of Sin: Pandora #6–14, 200 pages, paperback, October 22, 2014)

== See also ==
- Forever Evil
