= Trinity War =

Comic book story arc

- Triptych cover for Justice League #22, Justice League of America #6 and Justice League Dark #22; Art by Ivan Reis and Joe Prado
- Publisher: DC Comics
- Publication date: July – August 2013
- Genre: Superhero; Mystery
Title(s)
Justice League #22-23
Justice League of America #6-7
Justice League Dark #22-23
Constantine #5
Trinity of Sin: Pandora #1-3
Trinity of Sin: The Phantom Stranger #11
- Main character(s): Justice League; Justice League of America; Justice League Dark; Pandora; Phantom Stranger; Question; Secret Society of Super Villains

Creative team
- Writer(s): Geoff Johns, Jeff Lemire, Ray Fawkes, J. M. DeMatteis
- Artist(s): Ivan Reis, Joe Prado, Oclair Albert, Eber Ferreira, Doug Mahnke, Christian Alamy, Keith Champagne, Tom Nguyen, Marc Deering, Walden Wong, Mikel Janin, Daniel Sampere, Vicente Cifuentes, Renato Guedes, Fernando Blanco, Zander Cannon, Patrick Zircher
- Justice League: Trinity War: ISBN 978-1-4012-4519-1

"Trinity War" is an 11-issue comic book story arc first published in 2013 by DC Comics, featuring the fictional superhero teams the Justice League, Justice League of America, and Justice League Dark. The arc spans several titles, including Justice League, Justice League of America, Justice League Dark, Constantine, Trinity of Sin: Pandora and Trinity of Sin: The Phantom Stranger. The story is an action-mystery that sees the Justice League, Justice League of America, and Justice League Dark clash, in order to solve the mystery of Pandora's Box. The event also introduces the Crime Syndicate and the reveal of Earth-3 to The New 52.

The main storyline received generally positive reviews, though it was criticized for not having a true conclusion, instead leading directly into the "Forever Evil" storyline; the tie-in titles received mixed reviews. Every title involved in the story was collected into a trade paperback entitled Justice League: Trinity War.

== Synopsis ==
=== Lead-up ===
Pandora appeared in all first issues of the First and Second Wave titles of The New 52. Many of the stories since The New 52 was created at the end of Flashpoint lead up to "Trinity War". Some of these stories and events include:

- In DC's Free Comic Book Day 2012 offering, The New 52 Free Comic Book Day Special Edition #1, Pandora, the Phantom Stranger and the Question's punishments before the Council of Eternity were shown, as well as a final image foreshadowing the coming "Trinity War". Back in the present, Pandora is seen in A.R.G.U.S.'s Black Room (where magical artifacts are kept) to retrieve her box. The back up to Justice League #0 shows Pandora trying to open her box. She fails and is approached by the Wizard from the Council of Eternity. He tells her that he has given up his power (to Billy Batson) and that the Circle were wrong to punish Pandora for her curiosity. He tells her only the purest or darkest of heart can open the box.
- The backup to Justice League #6 hints at the formation of the Secret Society of Super Villains at the hands of the mysterious Outsider. The Secret Society was fully introduced in Justice League of America. In Justice League of America #1, it was revealed that the Justice League of America team was created by A.R.G.U.S. to stop the Justice League if needed, with each member being paired with someone in the Justice League. Justice League #18 introduces Firestorm, Element Woman, and Atom as the newest members of the Justice League, as well as the Watchtower being hacked. It is revealed at the end of Justice League #20 that Atom is an agent of A.R.G.U.S. and is actually a member of the Justice League of America. She was chosen to act as a spy within the Justice League. In Justice League of America #4, Arthur Light is called in by A.R.G.U.S. to examine the Secret Society's communication coin. While doing so, it is manipulated from the other side causing Light to be enveloped in a white light, giving him powers. In Justice League of America #5, it is determined that the Secret Society's manor has stained glass with images of Pandora's Box, hinting at their interest in Pandora.
- A mysterious intruder breaks into the Batcave in Justice League #19. They steal Batman's Kryptonite ring, given to him by Superman in case Superman were to lose control. Batman, leery of Superman and Wonder Woman's relationship, tells Superman that he does not have a "Kryptonite" for Wonder Woman in case things get out of control, with Superman being the only one to stop her. The ring is given to Despero, who uses it to attack the Watchtower. When the Justice League recover the ring, they notice a small sliver has been cut out of it.
- The Phantom Stranger asks the Justice League Dark, specifically Zatanna, to help him enter Hell to save his family. In Trinity of Sin: The Phantom Stranger #10, Zauriel warns Phantom Stranger that he is never allowed to enter Heaven again, having gone to try to save his family. Zauriel states to Phantom Stranger that if he tries, he will be erased from time and history.

=== Plot ===
In the year 8000 BC, Pandora finds the box and inadvertently opens it, unleashing the Seven Sins on the world. As a result, she is punished by the Council of Wizards with immortality. Pandora begins her travels, training and trying to destroy the Seven Sins. In the present, she receives information from the Wizard informing her that the box can only be opened by either the purest or darkest of heart. Pandora approaches Superman to open her box, believing he is 'without sin', but when he touches the box he appears to become possessed. Pandora manages to escape with the box, after which Superman seems to return to normal.

Shazam, having defeated his arch-enemy Black Adam, journeys to Kahndaq to bury him, inadvertently risking a diplomatic incident. Superman and the Justice League attempt to stop Shazam, which escalates into a fight. Amanda Waller decides it is the perfect opportunity for the Justice League of America to confront the Justice League, and dispatches them. During the conflict, it appears as though Superman murders the JLA's newest recruit Doctor Light. Seeming to have lost control of his powers, Superman surrenders himself to A.R.G.U.S.

Wonder Woman, believing that Pandora's box is responsible for Superman's actions, meets with Hephaestus, for answers about the box. She learns that he did not forge it and that Zeus and the other gods used Pandora to open the box because it contained something that the Gods of Olympus could not control. She meets with Justice League Dark to recruit them to track down Pandora. At A.R.G.U.S. headquarters, the Question enters Superman's cell and releases him.

The Question explains that he has evidence that indicates Doctor Psycho was in Kahndaq when Doctor Light was killed. Superman is physically ill and struggles to control his powers as he and the Question break out of the base to track down Psycho, with several other heroes in tow. When they confront Psycho, they determine that although he was present, he was not responsible for what happened in Kahndaq. Meanwhile, Pandora attempts to convince Vandal Savage to open the box, but he is also unable to do so.

While Batman examines Doctor Light's body, the Phantom Stranger arrives to warn him that should Wonder Woman locate Pandora and the box, it will be the death of all. They confront Wonder Woman and the Justice League Dark at Constantine's House of Mystery, but when Wonder Woman questions the Phantom Stranger about Superman's ailment, the Stranger admits he does not know what caused Superman's condition.

Batman convinces the Phantom Stranger to bring him to the afterlife so he can question Doctor Light. When Batman questions Doctor Light, the group learns that he does not remember anything about his death. Doctor Light gives a piece of his soul to the Stranger in hopes that he can give it to his family as a final gift. As the group is ready to leave, Zauriel appears, dismisses Batman and Deadman, and follows through on his promise to erase the Phantom Stranger from existence. Wonder Woman and her team track Pandora to the prison where Lex Luthor is held. Pandora approaches Luthor, hoping that he can open the box. Before she can give it to him, Wonder Woman and her group arrive to retrieve the box. Upon touching the box, Wonder Woman is apparently possessed just as Superman was.

The other superheroes around her attempt to get the box from her and free her from its power; one by one it begins to corrupt them all. Pandora can see the sins above the Justice League members fighting over the box. As the battle continues, Pandora is finally able to attack the Sins, by killing Envy. Constantine takes Shazam out of the area and tricks him into switching off his powers. Constantine then uses a ritual artifact to steal Billy's powers. When he is attacked by an agent of the Cold Flame, Constantine uses the Shazam power, but is unable to control it. Billy Batson distracts the agent, giving Constantine time to kill it, and Billy regains his power. Constantine pleads with Billy not to touch Pandora's box, afraid of the power it may possess, but Shazam leaves Constantine and returns to the group, where he sees the effect the box has had on Wonder Woman. He knocks the box aside and picks it up; the resulting contact corrupts him also, giving him an appearance similar to Black Adam and causing a huge ripple through the magical planes.

During the conflict, Constantine arrives, takes the box, and transports himself and Zatanna to the Temple of Hephaestus. There they find that Madame Xanadu had been kidnapped and locked away in a secret bunker. Xanadu tells everyone that Pandora had it wrong, that the box is actually a doorway.

Superman, Wonder Woman and their respective groups arrive at the temple. Constantine, still in possession of the box, realizes that the box is allowing evil thoughts to go through everyone's mind, and a massive fight breaks out as the heroes struggle to get possession of the box. Firestorm tells everyone that Superman is emitting Kryptonite. Element Woman goes inside Superman's blood stream and finds a small sliver in his brain. Atom then tells everyone that she put it there in Kahndaq, and that it was this that has been causing Superman's illness and loss of control of his powers. The Outsider comes out of the shadows to pick up the box. He tells the heroes that the box is not magic, but science, that was created on his world and can only be opened by someone from his world. He explains that the box opens a gateway to his homeworld, and that he and Atom arrived following the weakening of the barriers between the universes resulting from the Justice League's battle with Darkseid. The Outsider uses Pandora's box to open a portal to his home world, Earth-3, breaking the box in the process. The Earth-3 incarnation of the Justice League emerge — Ultraman, Superwoman, Owlman, Johnny Quick, Power Ring, and Deathstorm. Sea King does not survive the journey and collapses dead. Atom joins the group, answering to the name Atomica, revealing that she had arrived on Prime Earth along with the Outsider, who is revealed to be the Alfred Pennyworth of Earth-3. Cyborg's Apokoliptian prosthetics tear themselves from his body and form into a separate robot named Grid. Trailing behind the Crime Syndicate is a prisoner from Earth-3 whose identity is not revealed. The Crime Syndicate claim the planet as their own, and attack the three weakened Justice Leagues.

=== Aftermath ===
The outcome of "Trinity War" leads into DC's Forever Evil miniseries and "Villains Month" event, as well as the creation of new New 52 titles. Trinity of Sin: The Phantom Stranger #11 had major repercussions for Phantom Stranger and planted the seeds for a new story arc in Trinity of Sin: The Phantom Stranger #14, later revealed to be the "Forever Evil: Blight" storyline. At San Diego Comic-Con in 2013, Geoff Johns and Jeff Lemire said the events of "Trinity War" would affect many of the DC titles, not just the Justice League books.

== Name ==
The name of the crossover had brought speculation to what the "Trinity" stood for. In the 2012 FCBD special, Pandora, the Phantom Stranger and the Question were dubbed the Trinity of Sin. In regards to the name, Geoff Johns stated there was "a bit of a mystery" around it saying, "Is it about the Trinity of Sin? The trinity of Leagues? Is it about Batman, Superman, and Wonder Woman? What does "trinity" mean? What is it all about? That's something that the story explores." In Justice League #23, it is revealed that the "Trinity" refers to the true number of evil, three, referencing Earth-3.

== Titles ==
Triptych cover for Justice League of America #7, Justice League Dark #23 and Justice League #23. Art by Doug Mahnke.

Title	Issue(s)	Writer(s)	Artist(s)	Notes
Preludes
Justice League	#19–20	Geoff Johns	Zander Cannon, Andres Guinaldo, Gene Ha, Joe Prado, Ivan Reis	
Trinity of Sin: Pandora	#1	Ray Fawkes	Zander Cannon, Daniel Sampere	
Main Storyline
Justice League	#22–23	Geoff Johns	Ivan Reis	"Trinity War" Part 1 & 6
Justice League of America	#6–7	Geoff Johns, Jeff Lemire	Doug Mahnke	"Trinity War" Part 2 & 4
Justice League Dark	#22–23	Jeff Lemire	Mikel Janin	"Trinity War" Part 3 & 5
Tie-ins
Trinity of Sin: Pandora	#2–3	Ray Fawkes	Daniel Sampere	"Trinity War" interludes
Constantine	#5	Ray Fawkes	Renato Guedes	"Trinity War" interludes
Trinity of Sin: The Phantom Stranger	#11	J. M. DeMatteis	Fernando Blanco	"Trinity War" interludes

== Reception ==
=== Critical response ===
"Trinity War"
	CBR	IGN	Newsarama	CB Roundup
Issue	Rating			Average
Justice League 22	4/5 stars	7.8/10	8/10	7.9 (37 reviews)
Justice League of America 6	3.5/5 stars	8.1/10	7/10	7.7 (28 reviews)
Justice League Dark 22	2.5/5 stars	7.0/10	8/10	7.6 (28 reviews)
Justice League of America 7	4/5 stars	6.5/10	8/10	7.4 (27 reviews)
Justice League Dark 23	4/5 stars	7.6/10	8/10	7.7 (29 reviews)
Justice League 23	3.5/5 stars	6.0/10	8/10	7.7 (30 reviews)

The review aggregator website Comic Book Roundup reported a 7.3 out of 10 average rating for the event, based on 270 critic reviews. Just before the release of the final part, Jesse Schedeen of IGN stated, ""Trinity War" itself seems almost wholly disinterested in the Trinity of Sin, the Seven Deadly Sins, or any of the other elements the crossover was initially predicated upon." After Justice League #23 was released, Schedeen added,"Event comics often fail because they're more concerned with setting up a new status quo and changing the playing field than simply allowing readers to savor the high stakes and epic nature of the conflict at hand. "Trinity War" may well emerge as the new poster child for everything wrong with that approach. In the end, "Trinity War" becomes little more than a stepping stone towards Forever Evil. The result is that Justice League #23 is an almost wholly unfulfilling "finale" issue." Overall, Newsarama's Richard Gray praised the storytelling, with the event "cleverly weaving in threads set up two years ago in all related titles." However, Gray was somewhat critical of the fact that "the last panel of “Trinity War” leads directly into “Forever Evil”, effectively making this one big event that begets another. It's a crime that both major syndicates are repeatedly guilty of these last few years, one so commonplace that it is increasingly difficult to take umbrage with a singular instance anymore." Comic Book Resources' Doug Zawisza felt "there are no true conclusions of any sort" after the whole event, "just more shock-for-shock's sake moments and lots of new questions" added at the end of Justice League #23. As with Gray, Zawisza "was hopeful DC's tactic of bleeding events one to the next would be over following the relaunch, but this issue proves – without an inkling of doubt – that that is simply not the case."

==== Justice League ====
Newsarama's Richard Gray gave Justice League #22 an 8 out of 10. Gray stated that "Johns does a terrific job of pulling together what has been essentially four or five separate stories, incorporating not only the three main titles that this will span over the coming months, but introducing several new players into the mix as well." He also praised that the story advanced and showed similar promise that the reboot to the New 52 did in 2011. Joshua Yehl of IGN gave the first chapter of the Trinity War a 7.8 out of 10. He felt the issue set the stage for the event and praised the character work. However, he thought that the conflict was not presented clearly yet and criticized the lack of the Justice League Dark in the first issue. Comic Book Resources' Doug Zawisza gave the issue 4 stars out of 5, saying "Johns manages to balance personality expositions with story breaks, giving readers a sense of who the opposing sides are, if nothing else. Johns brings lots of big moments to the pages, but the emotions he wrings from those moments really help sell this book." Zawisza was surprised by the amount of time that was spent on Madame Xanadu, feeling as though it was only there for reason to include the Justice League Dark, and was wary that the characters are in danger of being absorbed by the plot. All three praised the art in the issue, especially Ivan Reis' pencils.

The conclusion to "Trinity War" received an 8 out of 10 from Richard Gray of Newsarama. He said, "It was clear from the start of “Trinity War” that this would only ever be a bridge between one phase and the next. By the final page of Justice League #23, that bridge is not so much burned as left a bit smokey from the waves of revelations that come to light in the issue's final pages. It's a fitting conclusion, but one that will require additional reading when the dust has settled." Doug Zawisza of Comic Book Resources was critical of the final issue, giving it 3.5 stars out of 5. He felt that while "Justice League #23 is a loud, clanging final chapter to the crossover between Justice League books", there "was way too much is left hanging out to be completed elsewhere." Jesse Schedeen of IGN was highly critical of Justice League #23, giving it a 6.0 out of 10. Schedeen felt that the Trinity of Sin "are practically non-entities in the story" at the end, after being teased as the center of the event back in 2012. He also felt the splash pages were overused and did not like lack of conclusion. Finally, he felt it was "refreshing to see that Johns has been executing a long-term plan for the past two years" and "the highlight of this issue, and probably the crossover as a whole, is the reveal of the Justice League traitor." Ivan Reis' art was a standout in the issue, and praised by all.

==== Justice League of America ====
Newsarama's Richard Gray gave the second part of "Trinity War", Justice League of America #6, a 7 out of 10. Gray felt this issue was "the difficult middle chapter of the first half of this crossover" and that "the issue works successfully in building up the pieces of the broader puzzle, but it may leave readers attached to the core members of the team out in the cold." He noted that the issue was more reflective in tone, opposed to pitched battles on every page. Gray criticized that the issue felt more like a Justice League issue, with the Justice League of America members all taking a back seat to the issue's events. He added that Doug Mahnke's pencils grounded the story in Geoff Johns' universe, but felt the battle sequences were not as good as Ivan Reis' in Justice League 22. Jesse Schedeen of IGN, who gave the issue an 8.1 out of 10, was wary that the "heavy emphasis on The Outsider and his schemes made "Trinity War" feel less like the big event DC has been building towards since the start of the New 52 and more like another stepping stone on the road to Forever Evil," but was surprised at Johns' ability to not dwell on The Outsider that much in this issue, and give each member a moral ambiguity, questioning their role in the conflict. Schedeen, however, was disappointed at how little the Trinity of Sin appeared in the issue. He also felt that the Justice League of America series got its strongest contender for art in Mahnke, but noted that it was not his best effort. Comic Book Resources gave the issue 3.5 stars out of 5, with Doug Zawisza saying he was not impressed with the issue, with a lot going on, and nothing really moving forward. He felt that Mahnke's art excelled in certain characters, especially Hawkman, Martian Manhunter, and Frankenstein.

IGN's Joshua Yehl gave the fourth part of "Trinity War", Justice League of America #7, a 6.5 out of 10. Yehl said, "With nearly two dozen heroes filling up every ounce of panel space, the reading experience becomes stretched thin as writers Geoff Johns and Jeff Lemire try to find something for everyone to say or do. The result is an event comic that has two more issues to go yet still hasn't decided exactly what this story is really about." He however, enjoyed Lex Luthor's appearance in the issue. Conversely, Richard Gray of Newsarama gave the issue an 8 out of 10, saying "For all the false starts and misdirection of the New 52, the first major crossover in “Trinity War” has come together nicely. While there is still the pervading sense that this is merely a set-up for the next major event, the “Forever Evil” villains month, there's no denying that it has been a hell of a ride so far," adding "all of the previously disparate elements from the various series begin to coalesce into something major." Jim Johnson of Comic Book Resources gave the issue 4 stars out of 5, feeling it was "loads of fanboy fun" and the issue actually progressed the series storyline, not just the event's storyline.

==== Justice League Dark ====
Newsarama's Richard Gray gave Justice League Dark #22 an 8 out of 10. Gray stated: "While many events that run across multiple titles often slap a logo on an existing series and call it a tie-in...Lemire ensures that his team are an integral part, [making] the team finally feel as though they are part of a wider DC universe. Indeed, in many ways, this appears to be the primary goal of “Trinity War”, in that it unites the often disparate strands of the New 52." Joshua Yehl of IGN gave the issue a 7.0 out of 10, saying "While the art and characters are done well, the overall plot of Trinity War leaves much to be desired." However, he praised Jeff Lemire's character work, and felt that Mikel Janin's art was the "cleanest and most consistent looking chapter of "Trinity War" thus far." Comic Book Resources' Kelly Thompson gave the issue 2.5 stars out of 5, saying the issue "gets devoured by the massive "Trinity War" and buckles under the weight" adding that the debate seems more plot driven than character driven. Despite the criticism of the story, Thompson praised Janin's art saying, "he does nearly the impossible and draws just about every single major character in the DCU perfectly."

The fifth part of "Trinity War" was given 4 stars out of 5 by Doug Zawiska at Comic Book Resources. He said, "The pacing of Justice League Dark #23 is smart and gives readers lots to chew on, but it also leaves what seems like a lot left to be resolved in the approaching final chapter of "Trinity War"." He also praised Janin's ability to accurately draw the characters used in the issue. Joshua Yehl of IGN also had similar sentiments, saying "While "Trinity War's" overall story is wonky, this chapter of Justice League Dark at least makes it a fun time." He also enjoyed Janin's art and gave the issue a 7.6 out of 10. Richard Gray of Newsarama gave the issue an 8 out of 10, saying, "Everything about this issue feels like a climax...even if next week's final chapter proves to be less than definitive."

==== Constantine ====
IGN's Jesse Schedeen gave Constantine #5 a 6.5 out of 10, feeling that "this issue doesn't seem to have much to add to the larger "Trinity War" picture," and that "Ray Fawkes sets up the next storyline for this series, certainly, but there's little tangible impact on "Trinity War"." Comic Book Resources' Jennifer Cheng gave the issue 0.5 stars out of 5, stating the issue "exhibits all the worst flaws of "tie-ins" or "interludes" for crossover event books [and] adds nothing to the big event and is almost useless to the ongoing title."

==== Trinity of Sin: Pandora ====
IGN's Joshua Yehl gave Trinity of Sin: Pandora #1 a 6.9 out of 10, saying "Ray Fawkes definitely gets a lot of credit for telling a story that spans all the way from 8000 B.C.E. to the present and making it such a smooth read," but failed to "kicks off the story without first giving a compelling reason to root for Pandora." Yehl also praised the art, saying it looked "impressively good" despite the fact that there were four artists on the book. Jim Johnson of Comic Book Resources gave the first issue 2 stars out of 5, saying that the story is a "protracted version of what readers have already learned in Phantom Stranger and elsewhere" and criticizing the fact that Pandora's origin greatly differed from that of her Greek counterpart and the story had little to do with the "Trinity War". Like Yehl, Johnson also praised the fluidity of the art from Zircher, Cannon, Sampere and Cifuentes. Newsarama's Aaron Duran gave the title a 5 out of 10, saying the comic is simply okay and would have worked better as a shorter installment within other books or as bonus digital content.

Trinity of Sin: Pandora #2 was given a 6 out of 10 by Newsarama's Richard Gray. He stated that "despite the “Trinity War” tie-in banners, [the issue] scarcely essential reading for current DC fans" adding that "Pandora's focus doesn't appear to be as concerned with this bigger picture" and the series requires a lot of backstory, only in its second issue. IGN's Jesse Schedeen gave the issue a 7.5 out of 10, commenting that "Trinity of Sin: Pandora #2 improves on the first issue, but the series still lacks a clear, ongoing purpose" and "as a "Trinity War" tie-in, this is certainly a more compelling read than Constantine #5." Doug Zawisza of Comic Book Resources gave the issue 2 stars out of 5, saying "Trinity of Sin: Pandora #2 is an average comic book all the way around. It doesn't add much to the "Trinity War" story despite the logo on the cover and it certainly isn't going to stick with me until the next issue."

Trinity of Sin: Pandora #3 was given a 6.0 out of 10 by IGN's Jesse Schedeen. Schedeen said the issue "is a dull tie-in that still succeeds on an intellectual level at times."

==== Trinity of Sin: The Phantom Stranger ====
Doug Zawisza of Comic Book Resources gave the issue 3 stars out of 5 saying, the issue "doesn't do much to advance the agenda or tighten up the plotlines of "Trinity War", but there is absolutely no question that the developments in this issue are going to have lasting ramifications for the Phantom Stranger and his quest for redemption." Newsarama's Richard Gray gave it an 8 out 10 saying "Some will pick up this issue for the links to the current “Trinity War” arc, but all should be transfixed by the way J.M. DeMatteis views the afterlife."

=== Sales ===
For July 2013, Diamond Comic Distributors announced that Justice League #22 was the fourth best selling title and Justice League of America #6 was the seventh best selling title for the month. For August 2013, Diamond Comic Distributors announced that Justice League #23 was once again the fourth best selling title and Justice League of America #7 was the fifth best selling title for the month. All six Justice League issues ranked in the top 200 of Diamond Comic Distributors' Top 500 Comic Books of 2013, with Justice League #22 ranking the highest at 37.

== Collected editions ==
The entire storyline is collected in the following volume:

- Justice League: Trinity War (collects Justice League Vol. 2 #22–23, Justice League of America Vol. 3 #6–7, Justice League Dark #22–23, Constantine #5, Trinity of Sin: Pandora #1–3, Trinity of Sin: The Phantom Stranger Vol. 4 #11, 360 pages, hardcover, March 12, 2014, ISBN 978-1-4012-4519-1; 320 pages, trade paperback, November 26, 2014)
