= Forever Evil =

2013–2014 crossover comic book storyline

- Cover of Forever Evil #1 (September 2013) DC Comics; Art by David Finch
- Publisher: DC Comics
- Publication date: September 2013 – May 2014
- Genre: Crossover
Title(s)
- Main:
- Forever Evil #1–7
- Forever Evil: Rogues Rebellion #1–6
- Forever Evil: Arkham War #1–6
- Forever Evil: A.R.G.U.S. #1–6
- Tie-ins:
- Justice League #24–29
- Justice League of America #8–13
- Suicide Squad #24–29
- Main characters: Lex Luthor; Crime Syndicate; Injustice League; The DC Universe

Creative team
- Writer(s): Geoff Johns, Brian Buccellato, Sterling Gates, Peter J. Tomasi
- Artist(s): David Finch, Richard Friend, Scot Eaton, Neil Edwards, Manuel Garcia, Scott Hepburn, Mick Gray, Jay Leisten, Jaime Mendoza, Jason Paz, Javier Pina, Norm Rapmund, Philip Tan, Patrick Zircher
- Forever Evil: ISBN 9781401248918
- Forever Evil: A.R.G.U.S.: ISBN 9781401249397
- Forever Evil: Arkham War: ISBN 9781401249403
- Forever Evil: Rogues Rebellion: ISBN 9781401249410
- Justice League of America Volume 2: Survivors of Evil: ISBN 978-1401247263

"Forever Evil" is a 2013–2014 crossover comic book storyline published by DC Comics that began in September 2013 and ended in May 2014, consisting of an eponymous, central miniseries written by Geoff Johns and art by David Finch. It is the first line-wide crossover since The New 52 reboot of the DC Universe. It focuses on all the villains of the DC Universe. The miniseries spins out of the events in "Trinity War".

Johns revealed in August 2013 that the Crime Syndicate, an evil version of the Justice League from Earth-3 in the Multiverse, are the true villains of the event and not the previously thought Secret Society. The event was originally scheduled to end in March with Forever Evil #7, yet ended in May 2014, after the final issue was delayed to April, and eventually again to May. The final issue's delay was due to Johns realizing he needed more pages to conclude the story than originally intended.

== Premise ==
With the three Justice League teams—the Justice League, Justice League of America, and Justice League Dark—"dead," the Crime Syndicate comes from Earth-3 to take over this world, where they recruit villains to their cause. Earth-0 villains that resist the Crime Syndicate follow Lex Luthor to form the Injustice League to take down the Crime Syndicate.

== Synopsis ==
=== Lead-up ===
In the final issue of the "Trinity War" event, the leader of the Secret Society, revealed to be Alfred Pennyworth of Earth-3, uses Pandora's Box to open a gateway from Earth-0 to Earth-3, which allows Ultraman, Superwoman, Owlman, Johnny Quick, Power Ring, and Deathstorm to arrive; their teammate Sea King, however, does not survive the trip. In addition, Superwoman brings a hooded prisoner through the gateway with them. Atomica is revealed to be the mole in the Leagues and is actually Atomica from Earth-3. Grid, a sentient computer virus, separates Cyborg's prosthetics from his body. The Crime Syndicate attack the three Justice Leagues, claiming Earth-0 now belongs to them.

At this time, Cheetah is imprisoned at Belle Reve and communicates with an unknown person, indicating that she will wait for Black Manta. Meanwhile, Zatanna mentions premonitions of an upcoming war between superheroes triggered by a death and John Constantine shaking hands with Lex Luthor.

=== Main plot ===
Lex Luthor meets with Thomas Kord in a bid to buy Kord Industries, when his helicopter loses power and crashes. Getting up from the wreckage, he sees Ultraman entering a LexCorp building looking for kryptonite. Ultraman asks Grid to find other locations of it. Grid also cuts power to all major cities and orchestrates the release of all superhuman prisoners. Returning to Gotham City, Nightwing is kidnapped by Superwoman and Owlman. In Central City, the Rogues attempt to break into Iron Heights Penitentiary to free Trickster, only to be interrupted by Johnny Quick, who succeeds in freeing all the inmates, while Deathstorm and Power Ring infiltrate Belle Reve. Scarecrow tries to recruit multiple Batman rogues to the Secret Society, and they, along with many other villains, gather at the Justice League's fallen Watchtower. There, the Crime Syndicate present Aquaman's trident, Wonder Woman's lasso, and Superman's cape as proof that the Justice League is dead. During the Crime Syndicate's broadcast to the world, Superwoman reveals that Nightwing is Dick Grayson. After the villains disperse, Ultraman is affected by the rising sun, and moves the moon in front of it to create a solar eclipse.

Luthor goes to the bowels of LexCorp to release Subject B-0, an imperfect attempt to clone a Kryptonian. At the Justice League Watchtower, Grid informs Ultraman that there is an uprising in Kahndaq, requiring his attention, and that the Rogues refuse to join the Crime Syndicate. Ultraman tells Grid to send Deathstorm and Power Ring to take care of the Rogues. Before departing, Ultraman checks on the prisoner brought from Earth-3. Owlman and Superwoman believe he should be killed, but Ultraman refuses, claiming that they might need him. Owlman asks that Grayson stay alive, but Ultraman and Outsider disagree, knowing he is not the Dick Grayson they knew from Earth-3. After Ultraman leaves, Superwoman (who is having an affair with Owlman) reveals to him that she is pregnant with his child. They make plans to have Owlman overthrow Ultraman and take control of the Crime Syndicate.

The Teen Titans arrive at the Justice League Watchtower to attack the Crime Syndicate, only to be greeted by Johnny Quick and Atomica. Quick uses his powers on Kid Flash, creating a hole in time that traps the Titans. At S.T.A.R. Labs, Silas Stone and Dr. Thomas Morrow remain in the Red Room to protect its technology and research. Batman and Catwoman arrive with the critically injured Cyborg, the only ones to survive the Syndicate's initial attack. Batman explains that, after the Crime Syndicate arrived, Deathstorm attacked Firestorm and imprisoned everyone except Batman, Catwoman and Cyborg inside the Firestorm matrix. While Stone and Morrow prepare to stabilize Cyborg, Batman learns of Nightwing's unmasking and leaves to find him. Elsewhere, Luthor connects to one of his personal satellites to locate the Crime Syndicate. He finds Ultraman and notes that he is avoiding direct sunlight. In Central City, Deathstorm and Power Ring confront the Rogues for failing to level the rest of the city. When Power Ring attacks, Captain Cold freezes his hand. Deathstorm attacks Captain Cold and extracts his freezing powers from his DNA. Mirror Master attempts to get the Rogues out through the Mirror World but Power Ring destroys the mirror they were using to escape, causing the Rogues to be separated. Captain Cold ends up at Luthor and Bizarro's location where they are joined by Black Manta, who has retrieved Black Adam from the ocean after his defeat by Ultraman.

Batman brings Catwoman to the Batcave, where he shows her his contingency plans to take down each member of the Justice League, hoping each will work on their Earth-3 counterparts. Luthor attempts to revive Black Adam while Captain Cold attempts to construct another cold-gun. Luthor takes his group through the sewers and breaks into Wayne Enterprises only to find Batman and Catwoman. Superwoman finds Ultraman taking Metallo's Kryptonite and tells him she is pregnant with his child and that Owlman is planning to overthrow Ultraman and take control of the Crime Syndicate. In Central City, Ultraman requests Deathstorm to use Firestorm's ability to transmute elements so he can create Kryptonite and sends Power Ring after Captain Cold. Power Ring, scared to go alone, asks Grid for help, who sends Secret Society members to aid him. Back at Wayne Enterprises, Power Ring arrives and attacks Batman and Luthor. Batman decides to use his contingency plan to take down Green Lantern and puts on a Sinestro Corps power ring. Power Ring's constructs are able to remove the ring from Batman and destroy it, inadvertently drawing Sinestro's attention to him. Sinestro follows Power Ring through the sewers, eventually severing his right arm, allowing his ring to search for a new host. Relieved to be free, Power Ring dies thanking Sinestro. Luthor, his team, Batman and Catwoman are able to subdue most of the Society members, while convincing Deathstroke to join their side. Ultraman and Superwoman go to the Batcave to steal Batman's Kryptonite ring, only to find it missing. Grid informs them of Power Ring's death, adding that his ring released a pulse of energy sensed across the multiverse. Ultraman, knowing the creature that destroyed their world has found them, orders the Syndicate to regroup and heads to Maine with them.

Batman, Luthor and their team arrive at the fallen Watchtower in search of Grayson and the Crime Syndicate. Grid informs the Outsider of the intrusion, and he goes to protect their hooded prisoner, only for Black Manta to intercept him and kill him. Batman, Luthor, Catwoman, and B-0, who now calls himself, "Bizarro", enter the room with Grayson and see he has been placed in a "Murder Machine", originally intended for Doomsday. They realize the machine is a detonator for a bomb that can only be stopped if Grayson's heart stops. The remaining members of the Crime Syndicate (Ultraman, Owlman, Superwoman, Johnny Quick, Grid, Deathstorm, and Atomica) return to the Watchtower and attack Sinestro, Deathstroke and Black Adam. Quick and Atomica attack Captain Cold and Black Manta, who have unmasked the prisoner and removed the tape from his mouth. Captain Cold freezes Quick's leg and then breaks it off. Back with Grayson, Luthor prevents Batman from saving Grayson, choosing to save the groups' lives over Grayson's. As Grayson dies, Batman wrongly attacks Luthor for murdering him, with Luthor trying to reason with him that he has everything under control. The hooded prisoner is revealed as Alexander Luthor. When he shouts "Mazahs!", Alexander transforms himself into the evil Mazahs and kills the injured Quick, taking his power.

Luthor is able to revive Grayson, having only momentarily stopped his heart to disable the machine, as Cyborg joins the heroes, having destroyed Grid. Cyborg gives Batman Wonder Woman's lasso, and he is able to release the trapped heroes within Firestorm. Superwoman reveals that the father of her child is actually Alexander Luthor, that she is actually loyal to Mazahs, and she's secretly been planning to overthrow both Ultraman and Owlman and have Mazahs take control of the Crime Syndicate. Mazahs kills both Deathstorm and Bizarro, and immobilizes Luthor. Realizing he sounds just like Mazahs, Luthor is able to use the magic word to summon the dark lightning, which transforms Mazahs back into Alexander Luthor. Luthor fatally stabs and kills Alexander before he can transform back into Mazahs. Ultraman attacks Luthor, but Black Adam and Sinestro move the moon, stopping the eclipse and rendering Ultraman powerless with sunlight. Atomica reappears from underneath rubble, only for Luthor to kill her by stepping on her. Luthor rejoins the heroes and saves Superman by removing the Kryptonite placed in his brain by Atomica. In the aftermath, Luthor tells Ted Kord he has decided to not buy Kord Industries, telling him that his father would want him to continue the family business and offering him any support or advice he might need. Ultraman and Superwoman are both captured, with Owlman still on the loose, and Luthor begins the process to create a clone of Bizarro, stating that it will take him five years to do so. It is also revealed that Luthor deduced that Bruce Wayne is Batman. Never learning from the Crime Syndicate who or what the entity was that destroyed their world, Superman believes that Darkseid has returned. At the end of the story, it is revealed that the entity is the Anti-Monitor, who has been going around consuming universes to attack Darkseid.

==== Forever Evil: A.R.G.U.S. ====
Col. Steve Trevor awakes at the remains of the A.R.G.U.S. headquarters in Washington, D.C., and learns from his secretary Etta Candy that the headquarters' destruction was caused by a massive spike in energy around Doctor Light's body and that A.R.G.U.S. and its agents have been completely exposed. After seeing the Crime Syndicate's broadcast, Trevor learns that the President is in danger, who has a backup key that would assist in A.R.G.U.S. regaining their assets. Trevor goes to the White House, where he encounters Shadow Thief, Deathstroke and Copperhead. Trevor is able to reach the President and escape the Secret Society's attack, returning to A.R.G.U.S.' headquarters with him. Trevor uses the President's key to open the Green Room, to keep the President and Candy safe, and heads to the Wonder Room, which he has filled with mementos of his past relationship with Wonder Woman. There, he finds the Delphi mirror and the Morai that reside within it, and strikes a deal with them to locate the missing Justice League members. After trading his memories of his time with Wonder Woman, the Morai teleport Trevor to Martin Stein's cabin, where Killer Frost has arrived. Both reveal they need Stein's help to find and help Firestorm, as Stein created the protocols that make the Firestorm fusion possible. Stein reveals that the matrix, if not found, will overload and explode, causing a second Big Bang. Elsewhere within the Green Room, Candy begins investigating about the founding of A.R.G.U.S., and Light appears in Los Angeles and is found by people known as the Crimson Men. Secret Society members try to get in contact with Killer Frost, and use their communication coins to find her location at Stein's cabin. Stein takes Trevor and Killer Frost to his secret, off the grid, basement, where he uses his teleportation devices to transport them to A.R.G.U.S.' Detroit station, known as "The Circus". Inside, they encounter fellow A.R.G.U.S. agents, who allow Trevor to talk to one of their prisoners, Psi, in hopes of seeing if she could psychologically disrupt the Firestorm matrix to free the Justice League. When Psi touches him however, Trevor realizes that he needs Wonder Woman's lasso of truth, which is in the possession of the Cheetah. In the Green Room, the President and "Mr. Green" discuss a promotion with Candy. Killer Frost, who is weakening due to Firestorm's disappearance, helps Trevor locate the Cheetah; however, they are attacked by her menagerie and captured. Cheetah uses the lasso on Trevor, only for Trevor to gain control, noting how the lasso will choose to be controlled by the purer heart. Elsewhere, the Crimson Men take Light to their secret location, and promise to make him human again, in exchange for information on Trevor. Light heads to Trevor's location following Cheetah's defeat to kill him. Trevor and Killer Frost fight Light, with Trevor using the lasso on him, to force him to teleport away. Martian Manhunter contacts Trevor to have him come help save the Justice League. Elsewhere, in the Green Room, "Mr. Green" reveals the history of A.R.G.U.S., and reveals to be a member of the Crimson Men, looking to reshape A.R.G.U.S. through Trevor and Candy.

==== Forever Evil: Arkham War ====
With the heroes gone, Penguin becomes mayor of Gotham City, and divides the city up to different Arkham inmates. Scarecrow, hoping to control Gotham, goes to see Mr. Freeze, the Riddler, Killer Croc and Poison Ivy to let them know that a war with Blackgate Penitentiary is coming and to gain their support. Through his conversations with each, Scarecrow learns that Bane may be the cause of the Blackgate uprising, and will be their leader in the impending war, hoping to use the Talons that were stored at Blackgate on ice. Bane, having escaped Peña Dura Prison in Santa Prisca, travels to Gotham hoping to control it as well, and orchestrates the release of Blackgate's prisoners during the Crime Syndicate's broadcast to the world. Bane enters Blackgate to join the prisoners there, where he comes across where the Talons are stored, hoping to make them in to his weapons. Scarecrow approaches Professor Pyg and Penguin to see if they will support him. Penguin has already planned for the impending war, by blowing up the bridges giving access to Gotham City. The attack on the city begins, with Bane's men attacking the Gotham City Police Department. Scarecrow and Man-Bat attempt to steal the frozen Talons from Blackgate while Penguin is having a meeting with Bane, though Bane arrives at Blackgate as the Man-Bats are attempting to transport the Talons to Mr. Freeze, able to keep one from leaving. The Man-Bats are able to bring the remaining Talons to Mr. Freeze, while Bane retrieves Emperor Penguin for the Penguin as part of their agreement. When he brings him to the Penguin, the Penguin tells him that the Arkham fighters are not scared of Bane, as he does not instill fear as Batman did. Realizing this, Bane constructs a batsuit for himself and sets his sights on retrieving the Talons. Bane wakes up the Talon William Cobb and takes him through Gotham where he fights members of Arkham Asylum. Bane begins recruiting Gotham citizens to his side, offering his base at Wayne Tower as a haven to the people to escape the rule of the Arkham inmates. He tells Cobb his plan to turn the city over to the Court, in exchange for use of Talons at his disposal to be powered by his Venom. Elsewhere, Scarecrow begins waking the Talons in his possession, having doused them with his fear gas and using Mad Hatter's mind-control technology in their helmets to control them. The Talons attack Bane's men, and eventually set their target on Bane. Bane, with the help of Cobb, is able to injure the Talons enough to activate their regenerative powers to remove the mind-control technology. At Arkham Asylum, Scarecrow senses he has lost the Talons and turns to his next plan, giving the other Arkhamites a small dose of Bane's Venom to temporarily transform them. The Venom-induced Arkham villains attack Bane and the Talons at Blackgate. They bring Bane back to Arkham Asylum, where Bane begins to defeat them as their Venom wears off. Penguin arrives to congratulate Bane, and offers to exchange his help for the Arkhamites. Bane takes the offer, keeping Scarecrow however, to hang between two buildings and declares that Gotham City is finally his. Following the defeat of the Crime Syndicate, Batman eventually returns to Gotham, delivers Scarecrow to the Gotham City Police Department, and is able to defeat Bane and his Talons. With Bane locked up in Arkham Asylum under heavy guard, Bruce Wayne and Commissioner Gordon work to rebuild Gotham City.

==== Forever Evil: Rogues Rebellion ====
After freeing the Trickster and attending the meeting at the Justice League Watchtower, the Rogues return to Central and Keystone City, only to see that both have been destroyed by Gorilla Grodd, who has proceeded to take control of Central City as its king and renames it Gorilla City. Captain Cold asks Mirror Master to help him get to the hospital where his sister Golden Glider is being held, to check on her. While there, the Crime Syndicate send Secret Society members to finish Grodd's work and destroy the hospital. The Rogues are able to hold them off, only to be interrupted by Deathstorm and Power Ring, who were sent by Ultraman to deal with the Rogues for resisting the Crime Syndicate. After battling Deathstorm and Power Ring, Captain Cold is separated from the other Rogues. The Rogues, now led by Mirror Master, land in Metropolis and are confronted by Archer. Trickster is able to quickly stop him, as Parasite arrives, because the Crime Syndicate has put a bounty on the Rogues' head. Unable to stop him, Mirror Master brings the Rogues into the mirror world to escape only to end up being caught by Poison Ivy in her district in Gotham City. Poison Ivy poisons Trickster to force Weather Wizard to move the eclipse to let her plants get sunlight. Weather Wizard says he cannot, but Mirror Master says he can help if he can rebuild his mirror gun. After getting the parts and entering the mirror world, Mirror Master is able to get sunlight back to Poison Ivy's plants. However, the vine holding him begins to break, forcing Trickster to go in after him, stopping the sunlight from coming through. The sunlight draws Man-Bats to the Rogues' location, who takes Weather Wizard and forces the others into Mr. Freeze and Clayface's territory. Mr. Freeze tells Mirror Master he is not interested in capitalizing on the bounty on their head, only to use Weather Wizard to create optimal conditions for him to freeze Gotham. As the Rogues are fighting the two, Black Mask arrives to capture the Rogues to receive the bounty. To escape, Trickster arrives with an Arkham van, having been separated from the others. Still being chased, Heat Wave sacrifices himself to allow the other Rogues to escape. However, they are stopped by the Royal Flush Gang. As the Gang transports the Rogues, Weather Wizard is able to free them, only for Mirror Master to blame him for killing Golden Glider. Choosing to leave, Mirror Master and Trickster go to the Royal Flush Gang's hideout alone to surrender. However, they use Mirror Master's constructs to distract them, while Trickster is able to rescue Golden Glider and bring her to the safety of the Pied Piper. Heading back to help Mirror Master, Trickster is greeted by Johnny Quick and Atomica. The duo nearly defeat Mirror Master and Trickster before Weather Wizard returns. The Royal Flush Gang are able to shoot Weather Wizard, as Grid teleports away Quick and Atomica, and sends Secret Society members and Grodd in their place. Pied Piper leaves protecting Golden Glider to join the Rogues in the fight against Grodd and the Society members. Seemingly defeated, the Rogues are joined by Golden Glider, who has woken up, due to the Pied Piper's music. Together, they trap Grodd and the Society members in the mirror world, allowing Central City to begin the rebuilding process.

=== Tie-in plots ===
==== "Forever Evil: Blight" ====
John Constantine, Swamp Thing, Nightmare Nurse, Pandora and the Phantom Stranger attempt to defeat Blight, who is the manifestation of evil itself, and rescue the missing members of the three Justice League teams.

==== Justice League ====
Revolutionaries in Kahndaq use an ancient scroll to attempt to revive Black Adam so he will be their champion once again to save them from their oppressive ruler. A man named Amon begins to read the ancient spell, but before he can complete it, the military attacks them. An injured Amon makes his sister Adrianna complete the spell which revives Black Adam. He proceeds to defeat the military forces and kills the Kahndaqi ruler, acting as Kahndaq's ruler again. On his way to deal with the situation in Kahndaq, Ultraman makes a detour to stop at the Daily Planet. There, Ultraman begins to interrogate Jimmy Olsen, thinking him to be similar to his Earth-3 counterpart. Noticing Lois Lane Ultraman comments how she shares the same name as Superwoman, but is not her physical equal. Meanwhile, Jimmy's watch sends out a distress signal, which is heard by Black Adam, who arrives at the Daily Planet and engages in battle with Ultraman. 30 years ago on Earth-3, it is shown how Alfred and Thomas Wayne Jr. killed his parents and Bruce. It is also shown how Thomas Wayne Jr. killed Dick Grayson's parents, taking him in so he would emotionally bond with him. Back in the present on Earth-0, Owlman breaks up a meeting of mob families in Chicago, taking control of them. Back at the Watchtower, Owlman goes to talk to Nightwing, telling him that he does not want what the rest of the Crime Syndicate wants. Able to break free, Nightwing attacks Owlman, before reluctantly agreeing to help him stop the Crime Syndicate. Grid continues to examine case files for the Crime Syndicate members attempting to learn how to feel, and sees Power Ring, Johnny Quick, Atomica and Deathstorm's histories of how they gained their powers. However, he is unable to view Superwoman's, as her file has been deleted, to which he states, that if he had feelings, it would now be suspicion. Meanwhile, at S.T.A.R. Labs, Dr. Stone is able to stabilize Victor, who begins to wake up. Victor asks his dad to make him Cyborg again, this time having it be his choice. Victor asks to go into the real Red Room so he can request which technology and equipment he would like in his new armor. Having been rebuilt, Cyborg sets out to find Will Magnus to learn more about his "Metal Men" project. Meeting with Magnus, Cyborg learns that he cannot help him. Magnus tells him the history of the Metal Men project and how they were destroyed protecting Magnus and the population. Seeing their responsometers that control them in Magnus' lab, Cyborg senses that their minds and hearts are still active, encouraging Magnus to activate them once more to help him. With the Metal Men reactivated, Cyborg informs them of Grid as they head to Happy Harbor to take on the Crime Syndicate. Cyborg lures Grid out and the Metal Men begin attacking him. Grid brings Society members to help, as Grid enters Cyborg's new body. Cyborg is able to trap Grid in his body, as the Metal Men defeat the Society members. The group is joined by Steve Trevor and Killer Frost as more Society members show up, with Cyborg taking Wonder Woman's lasso to go save the Justice League.

==== Justice League of America ====
Martian Manhunter and Stargirl awaken in the outer part of the Firestorm matrix, where they encounter Jason Rusch, one half of Firestorm. Jason proceeds to inform them that he believes they are in a prison constructed by the Crime Syndicate, and offers to bring Martian Manhunter through the inner parts. There, Martian Manhunter realizes that the "prison" seems to react to each of its inmates, creating a different experience for each. He sees the different prisons of Wonder Woman, Shazam, The Flash, Superman and Green Lantern. After losing Jason and realizing he is being pursued by an unknown person, Martian Manhunter is contacted by Stargirl, who stayed behind. She tells him she found a way out, and steps into the Crime Syndicate-led world. Losing connection to Martian Manhunter, Stargirl goes after him through the matrix. She passes through the previous prisons Martian Manhunter did, but sees glimpses of her past in each. She eventually finds him battling a version of himself crafted by the matrix. It is stated that the prison has no effect on Stargirl due to her youth. As such, she is able to escape the prison, and takes Martian Manhunter with her. Once out of the prison, Stargirl comes across members of the Secret Society. Stargirl realizes that by escaping the prison, Manhunter's conscious has merged with her. While she is fighting the Society members, she also is fighting Manhunter from entering her mind and memories. Manhunter is able to control Stargirl temporarily to fight off the Society, and Stargirl is able to focus long enough to escape. Finding a quiet spot, Manhunter attempts to locate the prison, only to trigger a memory of Stargirl's that makes her realize she needs to go help her family. Stargirl, wanting Manhunter out of her mind, is able to separate herself from him, and heads off to find her family. Manhunter, realizing the prison has weakened his abilities, is able to locate it and realizes that the prison is Firestorm, who is on the verge of detonating. Stargirl and Manhunter agree to travel together to find Firestorm or Stargirl's parents, whichever comes first. Eventually, they are stopped and attacked by Despero. Despero is able to defeat Manhunter with Stargirl arriving too late to help him. Manhunter tells her to continue to stop Firestorm from detonating, as he begins to die. Stargirl heads to Los Angeles and meets up with her family, only to be attacked by Despero. Stargirl is able to hold off Despero and she is able to get to Firestorm before he detonates. She gets inside his mind and sees Jason and Ronnie Raymond arguing, which she realizes is the cause of the impending detonation. Stargirl is able to stop them from arguing and contacts the trapped heroes, who are able to free themselves from the matrix. They proceed to attack Despero, while Stargirl suddenly awakes back in the prison. She sees Martian Manhunter and he tells her that they never left the prison, that Despero was manipulating each hero's prison from the outside. Stargirl was the only one able to break free of her prison, which gave Manhunter the opportunity to contact Steve Trevor on the outside, to learn that they needed to find Wonder Woman.

==== Suicide Squad ====
Following the prison break at Belle Reve, Amanda Waller contacts Deadshot and asks him to get the Suicide Squad back together, and he is able to recruit Harley Quinn back to the team. Waller gets to a secret area in Belle Reve, where she instructs Deadshot and Harley to go to the Rocky Mountains to intercept a weapon. Before doing so, Deadshot and Harley recruit Captain Boomerang back to the team. Back at Belle Reve, James Gordon Jr. learns that the Thinker is building a satellite to control something, while it is shown that the Thinker, disguised as Waller, has recruited Warrant, Steel and Unknown Soldier, under the guise of "new" Suicide Squad recruits, to also head to the Rockies to retrieve the weapon. In the Rockies, Power Girl arrives to assist the new recruits, where they learn the weapon is actually O.M.A.C. Deadshot, Harley and Captain Boomerang have also arrived, and the new recruits get instructions from "Waller" to kill the reformed team, while the actual Waller is attempting to contact Deadshot to not bring O.M.A.C. back to Belle Reve. The two teams fight until Unknown Soldier realizes that his team was approached by the Thinker, and were tricked. Meanwhile, Harley takes O.M.A.C. and activates him, causing him to fire a laser on the mountain, which collapses on the two teams inside it. At Belle Reve, Gordon finds Waller who proceeds to bring him to a secret sublevel in the prison, where she reveals "Project Y", who is Kamo, King Shark's father. King Shark begins to attack Kamo, until Waller is able to lie to both to get them to help her defeat O.M.A.C. once he arrives. Harley arrives at Belle Reve and drops O.M.A.C. near Gordon, who confronts her and learns that she betrayed the team in the Rockies, and that the Thinker is planning to use O.M.A.C. While Gordon is talking to Harley, the Thinker takes O.M.A.C. and begins transferring his mind to it. Now activated, O.M.A.C. proceeds to attack Belle Reve. Back in the Rockies, Power Girl is able to lift the fallen mountain, allowing the two teams to get free. They split up to find a way out of the mountain and while searching, Warrant falls into running water, and is swept away when Deadshot fails to help him; the teams are able to make it out. At Belle Reve, O.M.A.C. fights King Shark and Kamo, while Waller attempts to activate Belle Reve's fail safe through the Thinker's computer. Before she is able to do so, Kevin Kho reaches out to her, telling her he is trapped within O.M.A.C. As Waller works with Kho, the team returns from the mountains, only to be dragged into the fight with O.M.A.C. Having killed Kamo, O.M.A.C. is able to defeat Power Girl, Steel, Unknown Soldier and King Shark, and heads further into Belle Reve. Deadshot and Harley find "magic bullets" that will allow them to gain temporary super human powers. Deadshot fires them into Harley, Waller, himself and Unknown Soldier and the Squad begins to attack O.M.A.C. Kho is able to regain control of O.M.A.C. before Waller has to enact her last resort. But without knowing, Captain Boomerang knocks O.M.A.C. into a portal sending him to another dimension. Waller later tells the Squad that the "magic bullet" was actually a strand of a nano-bomb and they are once again tagged as with the explosive collars.

== Titles ==
Logo of Forever Evil, seen additionally on all comics that are part of the event.

=== Main titles ===
- Forever Evil - A seven-issue miniseries by Geoff Johns and David Finch, focusing on the villains of the DC Universe, and the Crime Syndicate taking over Earth-0. The series' final issue, originally solicited to release at the end of March 2014, was delayed until May 2014.

In October 2013, three six-issue main tie-in books launched:

- Forever Evil: A.R.G.U.S. by Sterling Gates, Philip Tan, Neil Edwards, Javier Pena, Jason Paz, and Jay Leisten, focuses on Steve Trevor and a select group of A.R.G.U.S. agents as they search for the Justice Leagues and hunt Society members.
- Forever Evil: Arkham War by Peter Tomasi, Scot Eaton and Jaime Mendoza, focuses on Batman's villains.
  - A concluding one-shot issue, Forever Evil Aftermath: Batman vs. Bane, by Peter Tomasi, Scot Eaton, Jaime Mendoza and Scott Hana, was released in April 2014.
- Forever Evil: Rogues Rebellion by Brian Buccellato, Patrick Zircher and Scott Hepburn, focuses on The Rogues.

=== Tie-ins ===
In addition, several of DC's ongoing comic series tie into Forever Evil starting in October 2013. These titles are:

- Justice League #24–29 by Geoff Johns, Ivan Reis and Joe Prado, taking place within the days of Forever Evil, spotlighting the Crime Syndicate, and featuring the return of some heroes to the DC Universe towards the end of "Forever Evil".
- Justice League of America #8–13 by Matt Kindt, Doug Mahnke, Christian Alamy; Eddy Barrows and Eber Ferreira, focusing on the fate of the Justice Leagues.
- Suicide Squad #24–29 by Matt Kindt and Patrick Zircher

Teen Titans #24–25 were originally solicited as tie-ins to the event, but upon their release, did not tie in, instead focusing on the Titans' individual travels through the time stream, as a result of the events in Forever Evil #2. Justice League #30, Justice League of America #14, and Suicide Squad #30, while not part of the official event, all featured the "Forever Evil" banner on their covers, and dealt with the aftermath of the event.

=== "Villains Month" titles ===
"Villains Month"
- An example of the "Villains Month" 3D lenticular covers, with the cover of Batman #23.1 or Joker #1 (September 2013) DC Comics. Art by Jason Fabok.
- Publisher: DC Comics
- Publication date: September 2013
- Genre: Superhero
Title(s)
- Action Comics #23.1–23.4
- Aquaman #23.1–23.2
- Batman #23.1–23.4
- Batman and Robin #23.1–23.4
- Batman/Superman #3.1
- Batman: The Dark Knight #23.1–23.4
- Detective Comics #23.1–23.4
- Earth 2 #15.1–15.2
- Green Arrow #23.1
- Green Lantern #23.1–23.4
- Justice League #23.1–23.4
- Justice League Dark #23.1–23.2
- Justice League of America #7.1–7.4
- Superman #23.1–23.4
- Swamp Thing #23.1
- Teen Titans #23.1–23.2
- The Flash #23.1–23.3
- Wonder Woman #23.1–23.2

Creative team
- Writer: Multiple
- Artist: Multiple
- DC Comics The New 52 Villains Omnibus: ISBN 978-1-4012-4496-5

For the month of September, in conjunction with Forever Evil, approximately one third of the ongoing titles at the time published multiple "Villains Month" issues, while the rest skipped publication. All titles used the "point" system, replacing the current number system, which resumed in October 2013. Titles were known by both their normal publication title, as well as their "Villains Month" title. Each book features 3D lenticular motion covers on the front and back of the title. DC also released 2D versions of the covers as well. As the 3D covers had to be printed months in advance than normal, neither the 3D or the 2D covers featured creator credits. This drew criticism from Yanick Paquette, who later clarified his complaints, saying he was unaware of the additional production needed for the covers and understood this was a decision DC was forced to make to get the covers out on time.

The DC villains that received their own titles and were a part of Forever Evil brought comparison to the Legion of Doom, because many of the villains are members of the different incarnations of the Legion of Doom. Many of the titles explore the background of the titular villain, with some being a straight one-shot, and others tying into Forever Evil.

List of "Villains Month" titles
Note: **Bold** indicates titles occurring around Forever Evil #1 or set within the Crime Syndicate-led world.
Regular title		"Villains Month" title(s)	Writer(s)	Artist(s)	Ref.
Action Comics	#23.1	Cyborg Superman #1	Michael Alan Nelson	Mike Hawthorne	
Action Comics	#23.2	Zod #1	Greg Pak	Ken Lashley	
Action Comics	#23.3	**Lex Luthor #1**	Charles Soule	Raymund Bermudez	
Action Comics	#23.4	**Metallo #1**	Sholly Fisch	Steve Pugh	
Aquaman	#23.1	**Black Manta #1**	Geoff Johns and Tony Bedard	Claude St. Aubin	
Aquaman	#23.2	**Ocean Master #1**	Geoff Johns and Tony Bedard	Geraldo Borges and Ruy Jose	
Batman	#23.1	Joker #1	Andy Kubert	Andy Clarke	
Batman	#23.2	**Riddler #1**	Scott Snyder and Ray Fawkes	Jeremy Huan	
Batman	#23.3	**Penguin #1**	Frank Tieri	Christian Duce	
Batman	#23.4	**Bane #1**	Peter Tomasi	Graham Nolan	
Batman and Robin	#23.1	**Two-Face #1**	Peter Tomasi	Guillem March	
Batman and Robin	#23.2	**Court of Owls #1**	James Tynion IV	Jorge Lucas	
Batman and Robin	#23.3	**Ra's al Ghul** **and the League of Assassins #1**	James Tynion IV	Jeremy Haun	
Batman and Robin	#23.4	Killer Croc #1	Tim Seely	Francis Portela	
Batman/Superman #3.1		Doomsday #1	Greg Pak	Brett Booth and Norm Rapmund	
Batman: The Dark Knight	#23.1	**Ventriloquist #1**	Gail Simone	Derlis Santacruz	
Batman: The Dark Knight	#23.2	**Mr. Freeze #1**	Justin Gray and Jimmy Palmiotti	Jason Masters	
Batman: The Dark Knight	#23.3	**Clayface #1**	John Layman	Cliff Richards	
Batman: The Dark Knight	#23.4	Joker's Daughter #1	Ann Nocenti	Georges Jeanty	
Detective Comics	#23.1	**Poison Ivy #1**	Derek Fridolfs	Javier Pina	
Detective Comics	#23.2	**Harley Quinn #1**	Matt Kindt	Neil Googe	
Detective Comics	#23.3	**Scarecrow #1**	Peter Tomasi	Szymon Kudranski	
Detective Comics	#23.4	**Man-Bat #1**	Frank Tieri	Scot Eaton and Jamie Mendoza	
Earth 2	#15.1	DeSaad #1	Paul Levitz	Yildiray Cinar	
Earth 2	#15.2	Solomon Grundy #1	Matt Kindt	Aaron Lopresti and Art Thibert	
Green Arrow #23.1		Count Vertigo #1	Jeff Lemire	Andrea Sorrentino	
Green Lantern	#23.1	Relic #1	Robert Venditti	Rags Morales and Cam Smith	
Green Lantern	#23.2	Mongul #1	Jim Starlin	Howard Porter	
Green Lantern	#23.3	**Black Hand #1**	Charles Soule	Alberto Ponticelli and Stefano Landini	
Green Lantern	#23.4	Sinestro #1	Matt Kindt	Dale Eaglesham	
Justice League	#23.1	Darkseid #1	Greg Pak	Paulo Siqueria and Netho Diaz	
Justice League	#23.2	Lobo #1	Marguerite Bennett	Ben Oliver and Cliff Richards	
Justice League	#23.3	Dial E #1	China Miéville	Multiple artists	
Justice League	#23.4	**Secret Society #1**	Geoff Johns and Sterling Gates	Szymon Kudranski	
Justice League Dark	#23.1	The Creeper #1	Ann Nocenti and Dan DiDio	ChrisCross, Fabrizio Fiorentino, Tom Derenick, Wayne Faucher and Andy Owens	
Justice League Dark	#23.2	Eclipso #1	Dan DiDio	Philip Tan and Jason Paz	
Justice League of America	#7.1	**Deadshot #1**	Matt Kindt	Sami Basri, Keith Champagne, Carmen Carnero and Bit	
Justice League of America	#7.2	**Killer Frost #1**	Sterling Gates	Derlis Santacruz	
Justice League of America	#7.3	**Shadow Thief #1**	Tom DeFalco	Chad Hardin	
Justice League of America	#7.4	**Black Adam #1**	Geoff Johns and Sterling Gates	Jay Leisten and Gabe Eltaeb	
Superman	#23.1	**Bizarro #1**	Sholly Fisch	Jeff Johnson and Andy Smith	
Superman	#23.2	Brainiac #1	Tony Bedard	Pascal Alixe	
Superman	#23.3	H'El #1	Scott Lobdell	Dan Jurgens and Ray McCarthy	
Superman	#23.4	Parasite #1	Aaron Kuder		
Swamp Thing #23.1		Arcane #1	Charles Soule	Jesus Saiz	
Teen Titans	#23.1	**Trigon #1**	Marv Wolfman	Cafu	
Teen Titans	#23.2	Deathstroke #1	Corey Mays and Dooma Wendschuh	Moritat, Angel Unzueta, Robson Rocha and Art Thibert	
The Flash	#23.1	**Grodd #1**	Brian Buccellato	Chris Batista and Tom Nguyen	
The Flash	#23.2	Reverse-Flash #1	Francis Manapul and Brian Buccellato	Scott Hepburn	
The Flash	#23.3	**The Rogues #1**	Brian Buccellato	Patrick Zircher	
Wonder Woman	#23.1	**Cheetah #1**	John Ostrander	Victor Ibanez	
Wonder Woman	#23.2	First Born #1	Brian Azzarello	ACO	

== Continuity and aftermath ==
Dan DiDio stated that all story lines with all the heroes would be published through August 2013. Forever Evil began in September and would continue to March 2014, at which point the rest of the universe catches up to the events seen in "Forever Evil". DiDio added that there would be major shake-ups with the teams, such as the Justice League, Suicide Squad, and Teen Titans, and that "nobody is safe." Geoff Johns stated that "Trinity War" and "Forever Evil" are the conclusion to the first phase of story arcs within The New 52. Johns added that this event would change the status quo of the DCU in a major way saying, "There are some major events that happen to some of our heroes and villains, and those are all reflected in the monthly books at the end of [the series], except for the ones that tie-in directly like the [three] Justice League titles, Suicide Squad, and Teen Titans. Those books will be up-to-speed monthly." The announcement of "Forever Evil: Blight" promised changes to the status quo for the titles involved, with each having major changes.

In August 2013, it was announced that at the conclusion of Forever Evil, the Justice League of America "goes through a dramatic change", relocates to Canada and recruit a Canadian superhero, who is Cree. The Justice League of America series would thus be retitled Justice League Canada. However, in January 2014, it was announced that the Justice League of America series would no longer be retitled, instead being cancelled and relaunching as Justice League United. Additionally, Nightwing, Suicide Squad and Teen Titans were cancelled as well in April 2014. However, Justice League of America, Nightwing, and Suicide Squad's final issues were pushed back to May 2014.

== Reception ==
=== Forever Evil ===
Forever Evil
	CBR	IGN	Newsarama
Issue	Rating		
1	3.5/5 stars	8.0/10	7/10
2	2.5/5 stars	9.0/10	8/10
3	4/5 stars	8.3/10	8/10
4	2.5/5 stars	8.0/10	8/10
5	3/5 stars	8.8/10	5/10
6	1.5/5 stars	9.2/10	8/10

Jesse Schedeen of IGN gave the first issue an 8.0 out of 10, saying "Regardless of your thoughts on "Trinity War", Forever Evil #1 is a solid start to DC's first real event comic of the New 52. It sees [Geoff] Johns diving headlong into a realm that he's succeeded in so often in the past." Schedeen wished that the Crime Syndicate had been featured more "to establish what makes this new take on the Crime Syndicate unique and why they're a greater threat now than they were the many times the Justice League clashed with them in decades past." Newsarama's Richard Gray was more critical, giving the issue a 7 out of 10. Gray felt that Johns trod a very thin line of overloading the story with too many villains and felt it was "immediately evident that reading this book in isolation of what has come before is almost impossible." He concluded that this event "has a familiar feeling to it, and it's almost like starting over after coming so close to something that felt like a conclusion to two years worth of questions." Meagan Demore of Comic Book Resources gave the issue 3.5 stars out of 5, saying, "In its chilling first issue, Forever Evil delivers a solid story rife with Geoff Johns' effective character use and David Finch's stunning artwork. Although the book suffers from confusing timelines and episodic material, its debut shows promise through some exceptionally notable moments and strong visual command. Forever Evil #1 paves the way for an interesting new epoch at DC Comics with a concept that will hopefully be just as effective in the tie-ins as it was here."

The second issue received mostly positive reviews. Schedeen gave the issue a 9.0 out of 10, saying the issue "manages to resurrect that feeling of excitement and sense of the unknown that event comics used to offer back when they were still a novelty." Schedeen felt though, that the Teen Titans inclusion was underused, and appeared to just be a set up for their tie-in issues. David Pepose of Newsarama gave the issue an 8 out of 10, feeling that Johns give just enough new material to keep readers interested, but would like to see the story "really cut loose". Comic Book Resources' Doug Zawisza was more critical, giving the issue 2.5 stars out of 5. He felt Forever Evil #2 was "filled with cool little moments that play nicely in a collection, but the story itself needs to get some traction soon or this series might simply be a collection of cool little moments without any strong significance."

Forever Evil #3 received positive reviews. Comic Book Resources' Jim Johnson gave the issue 4 stars out of 5, saying, "Johns makes sure that "Forever Evil" #3 gives readers their money's worth in the form of an intriguing idea with unexpected surprises amidst a foreboding but darkly fascinating environment. Finch and Friend do their part by making sure that the bad guys look good, and the true villains look threatening on a convincingly ruined and darkened world. Anyone who likes what Johns has done at DC and wants to see a modern-day DC multiverse done right will not want to miss this." Grey gave the issue an 8 out of 10, saying, "After three issues and several tie-ins, Geoff Johns finally starts answering a few questions after leaving us hanging since August. With Forever Evil #3, Johns begins to bring together a number of the mini-series and satellite events, including Forever Evil: Rogues Rebellion, that have been setting up narrative pins without any corresponding force to knock them down." Schedeen gave the issue an 8.3 out of 10, saying the issue was "another entertaining installment of this series, though the overall momentum of the event is starting to feel sluggish."

Forever Evil #4 received mixed reviews. Schedeen gave the issue an 8.0 out of 10, saying, "Forever Evil #4 makes some mistakes in terms of separating Batman and Luthor's factions and trying to hard to humanize Luthor. But it also manages to build Luthor's team into a compelling force and inject the plot with a spark of life it was starting to lose." Grey also gave the issue an 8 out of 10, adding, "Geoff Johns doesn't deliver any Christmas miracles for the beleaguered team in this final Forever Evil for 2013, but he does pack every square inch of it with enough geekgasm inducing moments that it's just like opening your presents all over again. More importantly, the story finally feels as though it is moving forward again after several months of tie-in selling stagnation." Conversely, Matt Little of Comic Book Resources gave the issue 2.5 stars out of 5, saying, "Forever Evil #4 is the halfway point of DC's big 2013 event, and it makes the story feel like it should be a five issue tale. We're in character shuffling mode, rearranging players on the board so they're in place for different stories that don't even look like they'll be told in this series. This issue is the comic book equivalent to listening to a friend standing outside a party telling you about how cool it is inside when all you want to do is just go in and see for yourself."

Pepose gave Forever Evil #5 a 5 out of 10. He said, "For every good thing this book does, there's another misstep or flaw that takes it right back to where it started. The premise is not one without potential - the idea that evil is relative, even in the traditionally black-and-white morality of the DC Universe, is one that can be mined for drama... But in order to really hit that mark, Johns needs to dig deeper, and to dig faster, as well - these are bad guys that I want to love, and I want to hate that I love them, too. But right now, it's hard to muster up much enthusiasm for DC's A-list bad guys." Schedeen gave the issue an 8.8 out of 10, saying, This is the issue of Forever Evil we've been waiting for. After four issues of slow build-up, Geoff Johns has finally assembled his full team of villains to stand in opposition to the Crime Syndicate. Now Lex Luthor and his Secret Society are taking the fight to the Syndicate, and the tide of battle is beginning to turn. The result is easily the most memorable chapter of the series so far." Zawisza stated, "Forever Evil #5 turns a corner in the story and also gives readers some crazy fights. It's a decent transition issue that doesn't feel like it's wasting time or shuffling in place, but instead begins to make small moves across the board, setting up the final conflict and (hopefully) the resolution to DC's crossover event. Lex Luthor is throwing down the gauntlet and making a run at reclaiming the Earth, just as the Crime Syndicate is beginning to fracture. With two issues left, Johns has saved plenty of drama, but at least he delivers some fun action scenes here," giving the issue 3 stars out of 5. Conversely Zawisza gave the issue 1.5 stars out of 5, stating, "As penultimate tales go, "Forever Evil" #6 has action and excitement, leading up to a big-time brawl, but it doesn't ever feel like it has turned the corner to deliver on any of the promises made. This series has been a bit of a disappointment and this issue is no exception;... [it] could have been Forever Evil #2, 3 or even 4 and a lot of foot dragging could have been eliminated."

Michael Moccio of Newsarama gave Forever Evil #6 an 8 out of 10, saying, "Between the reveal of the masked prisoner, to Nightwing's fate still being up in the air, to the spot on art by David Finch, this issue has so much going for it, that the small hiccups along the way become a moot point by the end... Besides the fact that Geoff Johns and the rest of DC continually tug at our hearstrings with the relationship Batman has with his partners, the creative team of Forever Evil hit it out of the park by complementing each other's strengths. This success sets them up with a perfect opportunity to bring the arc to an explosive and exciting end." Schedeen added, "Forever Evil #6 leaves readers wanting more, and that's both its greatest strength and one real weakness. It's a fantastically entertaining comic that capitalizes on Johns' flair for writing villains and all the build-up that has taken place so far. But it's depressing to think that this gathering of villains only has one more issue left before evil recedes again. I wanted more interaction among Luthor's group and between that group and the Crime Syndicate. The emergence of Forever Evil's final threat runs the risk of distracting from what has made this event work so well in the first place," giving the issue a 9.2 out of 10.

=== Forever Evil: A.R.G.U.S. ===
Newsarama's Richard Gray gave the first issue a 7 out of 10, saying, "While this may have been better off as a Steve Trevor one-shot, with little evidence so far that there's enough material here to sustain an entire mini-series, it is one of the first main "Forever Evil" tie-ins to give some glimmer of hope that there's a plan to get out of this thing." Jesse Schedeen of IGN gave the issue a 6.9 out of 10, saying, "It speaks to how well Forever Evil is unfolding that DC is launching a third tie-in mini-series and I still look forward to it with some anticipation." However, he felt the use of three different pencillers hurt the book. Comic Book Resources' Doug Zawisza gave the issue 2 out of 5 stars, saying, "Forever Evil: A.R.G.U.S. #1 succeeds in the spots where it doesn't focus on the acronym, the organization or the crossover with Forever Evil. Essentially, if this comic were called The Adventures of Steve Trevor, it would be a lot more on-target. The cover makes this seem as though it is a book about a team of warriors, but the story inside narrows the focus to Steve Trevor and Etta Candy, with a few cyphers dropped in for padding. This isn't the greatest tie-in story ever, but it's also not the worst."

=== Forever Evil: Arkham War ===
Doug Zawisza of Comic Book Resources gave issue 1, 2.5 stars out of 5. He stated, "The concept of Gotham split among villains is an entertaining concept and Bane's assault on the city will certainly be an interesting read, but Forever Evil: Arkham War #1 needs just a little more personality to really hook readers [because] right now this story is a trainwreck." IGN's Jesse Schedeen gave the issue a 7.1 out of 10, saying "Arkham War isn't a bad event tie-in, but if it's going to stick to a predictable formula of Bane battling one Arkham-ite after another, it could grow very stale very quickly." Richard Gray of Newsarama said, "This series has the potential to create a major power shift in Gotham or simply be a curious distraction," giving the issue a 6 out of 10.

The second issue received a 7.6 out of 10 from Schedeen. He stated that "Arkham War definitely improved in its second issue. However, most of the villains in this series are basically just eye candy and cameo fodder, and it would be nice to see more of them used as purposefully as characters like Scarecrow and Penguin." Jake Baumgart of Newsarama, who gave the issue a 7 out of 10, added that the issue "scratches a very particular itch in that we get to see these popular villains battle it out and stab each other in the back. Does this make for the most compelling story? Maybe not - but it sure is fun!"

Arkham War #3 received a 5.8 out of 10 from Schedeen, saying, "Surprisingly, a comic about every single Gotham villain (except Joker) locked in a brutal turf war isn't the greatest part of "Forever Evil". I suppose that says as much about the quality of Forever Evil as it does this book. Things were looking up in issue #2 thanks to an improved portrayal of Bane. Unfortunately, this issue pulls a 180 and makes this villainous mastermind an object of ridicule rather than fear." The final issue received a 6 out 10 from Baumgart.

=== Forever Evil: Rogues Rebellion ===
Newsarama's Richard Gray gave the first issue an 8 out of 10. He felt Forever Evil: Rogues Rebellion "is a welcome shift away from the main event with a focus on a smaller group of villains who just don't want to play ball with the big bad" and "has instantly become one of the most engaging aspects of the "Forever Evil" event." IGN's Melissa Grey gave the issue an 8.7 out of 10, saying, "writer Brian Buccellato has hit precisely the tone he needed to in order to emphasize the moral shades of gray the Rogues occupy." Doug Zawisza of Comic Book Resources gave the issue 3 stars out of 5, saying, "tied into the main Forever Evil series, this story is strong enough to stand on its own, but would have benefited from consistent art," a sentiment seen from all.

Gray gave issue two of Rogues Rebellion an 8 out of 10, saying, "While the rest of "Forever Evil" grapples with the bigger questions of the whereabouts of the Justice League, the moon being shifted out of its orbit and general villainy, Forever Evil: Rogues Rebellion focuses on a compelling set of characters at the heart of the maelstrom, and is all the more rewarding for it." Greg McElhatton of Comic Book Resources gave the third issue 2 stars out of 5. He said, "Forever Evil: Rogue's Rebellion #3 ultimately feels forgettable. It's not bad but it's not anything special, either. In the end, Forever Evil: Rogue's Rebellion feels like it's headed into the realm of generic comic event tie-in. Sadly, it'll have a lot of company."

Issue four received a 7 out of 10 from Newsarama's Rob McMonigal. He said, "Pitting Flash's foes against Batman's while both are out of play is a great move by writer Brian Buccellato. Bruce's foes are ruthless, brutal, and backstabbing. Barry's try to stick together, even against hopeless odds. In a world of extreme evil, their brand of criminal is almost heroic. Co-artists Scott Hepburn and Andre Coelho do a great job with visualizing the large cast, but their action is a bit stiff, with panel choices that don't create a lot of tension. Still, this is one of the best things to come out of "Forever Evil" so far." Forever Evil: Rogues Rebellion issue five received a 6 out of 10 from Michael Moccio of Newsarama. Moccio stated, "Brian Buccellato continues filling in the blanks in the Forever Evil story in this latest issue with the loveable Rogues. Our heroes, especially Weather Wizard, get a chance to finally catch a break, and Buccellato manages to do this while still keeping to the desperate tone of the overall Forever Evil storyline... The art is the weakest part of the issue, making it appear too cartoonish. The proportions, especially in the face, are off and distracting, and the flat coloring adds to the two-dimensional feel of the book... With the mysterious entity emerging in the main storyline, readers are left wondering with where this part of the story will finish."

=== Justice League ===
Jesse Schedeen of IGN gave Justice League #24 an 8.5 out of 10. He felt, "If you've enjoyed the scenes of Ultraman snorting Kryptonite and generally being as un-Superman-like as possible, you'll like Johns' origin story here." As well, "Johns is able to push the ongoing Forever Evil threads forward a bit more, hinting at the tension among the Crime Syndicate, the identity of their mysterious prisoner, and the threat that drove them away from Earth-3 in the first place." Comic Book Resources' Doug Zawisza enjoyed the issue, giving it 3.5 stars out of 5. He enjoyed the panel and shout out to the Doom Patrol, but was disappointed that it appeared the battle between Ultraman and Black Adam would be concluded in Forever Evil #3, and not in Justice League. Richard Gray of Newsarama gave the issue a 7 out of 10, saying, "The basic building blocks are all here for an interesting introduction to a new world, but this is still ultimately the fundamental dilemma of "Forever Evil". It's a beginning of something when it should be the dramatic apex following an already cataclysmic change. With the main story continuing in the pages of the seven-part Forever Evil mini-series, it's just hard to escape the feeling that DC's flagship title is being used here as a sideshow to the main event.

Issue 25 received a 9.3 out of 10 from Schedeen. He said the "Owlman-centric story makes for the strongest Forever Evil tie-in so far," adding that Johns, who "already cleverly subverted the Batman origin once with Flashpoint's Batman,... winds up combining a few elements of [that character and Scott Snyder's recent take on the rise of Earth-1's Owlman], firmly establishing this Owlman as different from either character." Gray gave the issue a 6 out of 10, feeling a bit different from Schedeen, saying, "Ultimately, the issue doesn't bring us any closer to finding out what the current status of the "real" Justice League is, nor does it further the plans and schemes of the Crime Syndicate, save for the last few pages. It does, however, remain a solid piece of standalone storytelling, which would be terrific if we could take it as such. However, as part of a bigger piece of the arc, it certainly doesn't feel like essential reading." Zawisza gave the issue 3.5 stars out of 5, saying, that despite an art team change, and the fact that the issue would be better served being titled Forever Evil #3.5, Johns' tells "an engaging and entertaining tale of the origin" of Owlman.

Justice League #26 received mixed reviews, with Comic Book Resources' Greg McElhatton giving the issue 2 stars out of 5, Gray giving it a 5 out of 10 and Schedeen awarding the issue an 8.1 out of 10. McElhatton said, "In the end Justice League #26 will work better as part of a supplemental collected edition to Forever Evil than as a Justice League story in its own right. It's just not as much fun as a single issue, alas" while Gray stated, "At its core, Forever Evil is a solid concept, as evidenced by the strength of [Forever Evil #4], but tie-in issues such as this show the inherent weakness in stretching a good idea too thin. Sucking any of the life and momentum out of the threads Johns was playing with in "Trinity War" and the related arcs, Justice League, and by extension those books that relate to it, is now sitting very still and waiting for something to happen." Schedeen said, "Geoff Johns continues his efforts to flesh out the individual members of the Crime Syndicate. The big change this time is that issue #26 focuses on several team members, rather than just one. Grid, Power Ring, Johnny Quick, Atomica, and Deathstorm all step into the spotlight at varying points."

Zawisza gave issue 27 4 stars out of 5, saying, ""Forever Doomed" is somewhat predictable with regards to the appearance of the Doom Patrol and the motions Cyborg goes through, but Justice League #27 is nowhere near boring. This comic book serves very well as Doom Patrol #0 or even Cyborg #0 (maybe now Vic Stone will be able to find his way to a solo series) or a companion piece to "Forever Evil," but lacks the Justice League for which this comic is branded." Schedeen said, "Justice League #27 offers a change of pace for the series' Forever Evil tie-in storyline. Having explored the origins of the various Crime Syndicate members in previous issues, Geoff Johns now turns his attention back to Earth's dwindling lineup of heroes. As the cover suggests, Cyborg is the star of the show this month, although a handful of other characters put in appearances as well," giving the issue an 8.0 out of 10. David Pepose of Newsarama gave the issue a 7 out of 10, saying, "For those who have been exasperated at the slow pacing of Forever Evil, well, you probably won't be too thrilled here -- this issue is certainly a detour, although it's one that might mean a lot for a truly underutilized hero (or several). That said, if comics like these are what we need to introduce even more of DC's properties back into the public eye, it's not a tremendous cost -- there's some humanity underneath all that event machinery, and it's nice to see Justice League #27 try to find that beating heart."

Issue 28 received positive reviews, with Grey giving the issue an 8 out of 10. He said, "The title of this month's Justice League, "Forever Worthy", is somewhat apt, as this run has been a lot more fun than all expectations would have indicated. While the "Forever Evil" arc has undoubtedly taken its sweet time getting to wherever it is supposed to go, now entering its sixth month (or twice that long if taken together with the "Trinity War" storyline), it's also got an amazing continuing ability to find new corners of the New 52 to open up for the first time." Schedeen gave the issue an 8.8 out of 10, saying, "This issue didn't do much to advance the overall Forever Evil conflict, but the strong character work more than makes up for that. Johns is able to quickly and capably revamp the Metal Men for the New 52 without losing any of the goofy charm that made them special in the first place. Hopefully this issue is just the start of a bright future for this unusual superhero team." Zawisza also gave the issue praise, giving it 4 stars out of 5.

=== Justice League of America ===
IGN's Jesse Schedeen and Comic Book Resources' Doug Zawisza both gave Justice League of America #8 favorable reviews, with an 8.6 out of 10 and 3.5 stars out of 5, respectively. Both enjoyed new series writer Matt Kindt's use of Martian Manhunter, and Doug Mahnke's art as a consistent factor from Geoff John's run on the title. Schedeen added that the series is "a vital addition to "Forever Evil", but it neither punishes readers who only want to read that series nor those who just want to keep up with the JLA characters."

Justice League of America #9 received a 6.8 out of 10 from Schedeen. He said, "While there's still a fair amount of space devoted to the other Leaguers and their respective torments, at least as much attention is devoted to fleshing out [Stargirl and Marian Manhunter's] histories within the New 52. And thank goodness, too, because most of the psychological torment elements feel redundant after being thoroughly covered in issue #8. Framing the ordeal through Stargirl's eyes now doesn't do enough to change the formula." David Pepose of Newsarama, giving the issue a 4 out of 10, felt that issue 9 was too similar to issue 8, exploring the same prisons only through Stargirl's eyes.

Issue 10 received mixed reviews, with Schedeen giving the issue 7.1 out of 10 and Zawisza giving the issue 2 stars out of 5. Schedeen said, "Despite being the only book to showcase the fate of the Justice Leagues during "Forever Evil", Justice League of America doesn't feel quite as vital or exiting as its sister series. It reads more like a method of keeping these characters out of the conflict until the right moment than something that really furthers the events of Forever Evil. However, this storyline continues to succeed in one key area. It shines a spotlight on two character who haven't received enough attention in the New 52 so far - Martian Manhunter and Stargirl." Zawisza was less favorable, adding, "Featuring a fraction of the Justice League team usually found in this title, Kindt delivers an odd buddy story that isn't really much of a buddy story at all. The story itself is a quaint investigation of Stargirl's history, but it really could have been just as effective in a more condensed deliverable."

Issue 11 continued the mixed reviews, with Schedeen giving the issue a 6.9 out of 10 and Zawisza giving it 1 star out of 5. Schedeen said, "Justice League of America has pretty much run out of any useful material to add to "Forever Evil". The series is now really just a platform for Martian Manhunter and Stargirl to shine in ways they haven't been able to in the first two years of the New 52. And in that sense this tie-in arc remains successful, though the story really is beginning to feel drawn out by this point." Zawisza added, "This title certainly feels as though it has been shuffling its feet through the darkness of "Forever Evil," afraid of stepping on something or stubbing its toe, but more noticeably, it simply isn't getting anywhere with any speed. Instead of delivering stories worthy of the "Justice League of America" brand, this comic book is simply holding a spot on the shelves warm until something else shows up. I just hope whatever that "something else" is it brings more heart and character."

More positive reviews were given for Justice League of America #12. Schedeen gave the issue an 8.1 out of 10, saying, "This series' Forever Evil tie-in storyline was really beginning to drag in issue #11. But fortunately, with only one issue left to go until the finale, the pace is rapidly picking up again. It's not even that issue #12 hits markedly different beats from #11. It's more the winning blend of action and desperate emotion Matt Kindt is able to bring to the table. Never has the desperation of Martian Manhunter and Stargirl's cross-country journey been more palpable. But even when death and failure loom closer than ever, hope springs anew." Newsarama's Jake Baumgart gave the issue a 7 out of 10, saying, "What is probably the main hang up of Justice League of America #12 isn't that it leaves the reader hungry for more, but unsatisfied... Matt Kindt does an excellent job of establishing the relationship between what might seem like a completely random pairing and adding a level of compassion to their characters that hasn't been established in recent history... Even though this issue is mired in crossover confusion, Justice League of America #12 is still a strong book about DC's leading heroes." Jim Johnson of Comic Book Resources added, "Justice League of America #12 is a "Forever Evil" tie-in that has its moments, and ends on a promising note that bodes well for next issue, but also has a lot of soft spots that hold it back from being a truly worthy extension of the overall story. It's the kind of ancillary comic that many might have expected to be a lot worse, but easily could have been so much better," giving the issue 3 stars out of 5.

=== Suicide Squad ===
Jesse Schedeen of IGN gave issue 24 a 7.4 out of 10, saying, "Even with [Ales] Kot gone and the series tying into Forever Evil, this is still the slick, deadly version of the Squad from the past few months." Greg McElhatton of Comic Book Resources echoed Schedeen, added "Kindt's first issue on the series feels rather fitting, since it's essentially about a new creative team trying to take over the Suicide Squad during the chaos of "Forever Evil"," and that Kindt's script "sticks firm with what readers have seen up until now." McElhatton gave the issue 3 stars out of 5. Newsarama's Rob Mcmonigal gave the issue an 8 out 10, saying, "Writer Matt Kindt doesn't disappoint here [with] full of action from start to finish."

Pierce Lydon of Newsarama gave issue 25 a 6 out of 10, saying, "The return of a fan-favorite character and Kindt's character work with Harley is the standout in an issue that could be characterized as something of a red herring." Doug Zawisza of Comic Book Resources gave the issue 3.5 stars out of 5. He felt that, "With the pair of teams yielding over a half dozen characters, and layers of subplots and revealed secrets, Suicide Squad #25 is a very thick read, rewarding the reader on multiple levels and promising plenty more intrigue and excitement."

Lydon gave issue 28 a 3 out of 10, saying, "Even O.M.A.C. can't save this one. Matt Kindt's uneven plotting and characterization is matched in its inconsistency by Jason Masters and Carlos Rodriguez' art. All the double and triple crossing is coming a head as the gang sets aside some differences to deal with a Thinker-run OMAC bent on destroying them and Belle Reve. But there is very little substance here. OMAC takes out the entire team singlehandedly and Kindt throws in a solution that we don't even get to see executed. It feels like a single issue stretched to its limits to cover enough pages for two. Masters and Rodriguez have a few moments of competency but overall their work is boring. Their visual storytelling is brought down by statuesque characters and a lack of clear focus. It's probably for the best that this book will soon be put out of its misery."

Suicide Squad #29 received a 6.9 out of 10 from Schedeen, saying "Suicide Squad #29 caps off this series' tie-in arc as the whole gang bands together to stop O.M.A.C.'s rampage. It's not a particularly remarkable finish, but it allows for some nice moments with several characters, sets the stage for the team post-Forever Evil, and offers new hope that DC is building towards something bigger with the various Jack Kirby characters." Lydon gave the final issue a 3 out of 10, saying, "Matt Kindt's run on Suicide Squad ends with a whimper... There's no wow factor in this one. It's just being seen through to the end. The ending does move toward resetting the concept of the Suicide Squad, maybe in the hopes that a new writer can do them some justice in the future."

=== "Villains Month" ===
The "Villains Month" event and issues were met with mixed reviews. Some of the month's highlights include: Count Vertigo #1, Deadshot #1, Black Manta #1, The Riddler #1, Arcane #1, Cheetah #1, Man-Bat #1 and Parasite #1. Conversely, Joker's Daughter #1 was universally criticized, with IGN saying "It does almost nothing to justify its existence. The story is less than engaging and the main character is probably the least interesting villain of all time. Joker's Daughter is a mess from start to finish and certainly not a comic that can be recommended to fans of Batman or the Joker. This is rock bottom for "Villains Month", no doubt." Newsarama stated that the issue "bounces all over the place and never once finds any kind of voice, for character or story" and reviewer Aaron Duran had no idea what was going on. Greg McElhatton of Comic Book Resources added, "this is a comic that you shouldn't be rushing to the store in order to snag a copy" and "within six months, most readers will be trying to forget all about the new Joker's Daughter."

== Sales ==
For September 2013, Diamond Comic Distributors announced that Forever Evil #1 was the best selling title of the month. In addition, the four Batman "Villains Month" titles were in the top ten, with Joker #1 placing fifth, Riddler #1 sixth, Bane #1 eighth, and Penguin #1 coming in tenth, while all "Villains Month" titles with a 3D cover ranked in the top 125 in sales. "Villains Month" titles with a 2D cover placed between 49 and 211 on the chart. In October 2013, Forever Evil #2 was the fourth best selling title of the month, with Justice League #24 coming in sixth. In November 2013, Forever Evil #3 was the fifth best selling title of the month. In December 2013, Forever Evil #4 ranked fourth for the month, while Justice League #25 and 26 ranked sixth and eighth, respectively, in sales. Forever Evil #1–4 ranked 15, 38, 53, and 67, respectively, in Diamond Comic Distributors' Top 500 Comic Books of 2013. All four Batman "Villains Month" titles and Justice League #24–26 ranked in the top 100 as well. Additionally, 17 other "Villains Month" titles, Forever Evil: Arkham War #1 and 2, Justice League of America #8–10 and Justice League Dark #24 made the list. In January 2014, Justice League #27 was the fourth best selling title of the month, along with Justice League of America #11 in tenth. Forever Evil #5 was the second best selling title of February 2014, with Justice League #28 placing fifth. For March 2014, Forever Evil #6 was the third best selling title, while Justice League of America #13 placed 22 and Forever Evil: Arkham War #6 placed 52. In April 2014, Justice League #29 was the fifth best selling title of the month. Forever Evil #7 was the fifth best selling title of May 2014.

== Collected editions ==
The crossover is collected in the following volumes:

- Forever Evil (collects Forever Evil #1-7, 240 pages, hardcover, September 3, 2014)
- Forever Evil: A.R.G.U.S. (collects Forever Evil: A.R.G.U.S. #1–6, 144 pages, paperback, September 24, 2014)
- Forever Evil: Arkham War (collects Forever Evil: Arkham War #1–6, Batman Vol. 2 #23.4, Forever Evil Aftermath: Batman Vs. Bane #1, 200 pages, paperback, September 17, 2014)
- Forever Evil: Rogues Rebellion (collects Forever Evil: Rogues Rebellion #1–6, The Flash Vol. 4 #23.1, 160 pages, paperback, September 24, 2014)
- Forever Evil: Blight (Collects Justice League Dark #24–29, Constantine #9–12, Trinity of Sin: Pandora #6–9, Trinity of Sin: Phantom Stranger (vol. 4) #14–17, 400 Pages, paperback, September 24, 2014)
- Justice League Volume 5: Forever Heroes (collects Justice League Vol. 2 #24–29, 168 pages, hardcover, September 10, 2014)
- Justice League of America Volume 2: Survivors of Evil (collects Justice League of America Vol. 3 #8–14, 192 pages, hardcover, September 10, 2014, ISBN 978-1401247263)
- Suicide Squad Volume 5: Walled In (collects Suicide Squad Vol. 4 #24–30, Suicide Squad: Amanda Waller #1, 208 pages, paperback, October 22, 2014)

The September 2013 "Villains Month" titles were collected in the following volume:

- DC Comics The New 52 Villains Omnibus (collects Action Comics Vol. 2 #23.1–23.4, Aquaman Vol. 7 #23.1–23.2, Batman Vol. 2 #23.1–23.4, Batman and Robin Vol. 2 #23.1–23.4, Batman/Superman #3.1, Batman: The Dark Knight Vol. 2 #23.1–23.4, Detective Comics Vol. 2 #23.1–23.4, Earth 2 #15.1–15.2, The Flash Vol. 4 #23.1–23.3, Green Arrow Vol. 6 #23.1, Green Lantern Vol. 5 #23.1–23.4, Justice League Vol. 2 #23.1–23.4, Justice League Dark #23.1–23.2, Justice League of America Vol. 3 #7.1–7.4, Superman Vol. 3 #23.1–23.4, Swamp Thing Vol. 5 #23.1, Teen Titans Vol. 4 #23.1–23.2, Wonder Woman Vol. 4 #23.1–23.2, 1,184 pages, hardcover, December 11, 2013, ISBN 978-1-4012-4496-5)

Solicited for release in February 2025:

- Forever Evil Omnibus (Collects Justice League Dark #24-29; Suicide Squad #24-30; Justice League #24-30; Justice League of America #8-13; Trinity of Sin: The Phantom Stranger #12-17; Constantine #9-12; Trinity of Sin: Pandora #4-9; Forever Evil #1-7; Forever Evil: Arkham War #1-6; Forever Evil: Rogues Rebellion #1-6; Forever Evil: A.R.G.U.S. #1-6; Forever Evil Aftermath: Batman vs. Bane #1)

== In other media ==
The storyline served as inspiration for the 2018 video game, Lego DC Super-Villains.
