= Pandora (DC Comics) =

DC Comics character

- Artwork for the cover of Trinity of Sin: Pandora #1 (August 2013), art by Ryan Sook.

Publication information
- Publisher: DC Comics
- First appearance: Original: New Comics #5 (June 1936); Reboot: Flashpoint #5 (October 2011)
- Created by: Reboot version: Geoff Johns; Andy Kubert

In-story information
- Team affiliations: Justice League; Justice League Dark
- Partnerships: Phantom Stranger; The Question; John Constantine
Trinity of Sin: Pandora
Publication information
- Schedule: Monthly
- Format: Ongoing series
- Genre: Superhero
- Publication date: July 2013 – August 2014
- No. of issues: 14
Creative team
- Written by: Ray Fawkes
- Artist(s): Daniel Sampere, Vicente Cifuentes, Patrick Zircher

Pandora is a fictional character appearing in American comic books published by DC Comics. She is based on Pandora of Greek mythology.

== Publication history ==
In August 2010, DC Comics released Wonder Woman #45, which introduced Pandora in a back story that involved how Diana Prince and Pandora are connected to the fate of the Amazons. She went on to appear in Flashpoint #5 (October 2011), created by Geoff Johns and Andy Kubert. Subsequently, Pandora made a cameo appearance in every initial title of The New 52. DC Comics released Trinity War in August 2013, a comic book story arc from Pandora's point of view that involved her resuming a cursed crusade to destroy the seven deadly sins. Pandora's solo series, Trinity of Sin: Pandora, lasted 14 issues and left her fate open for further story development. The character was eventually killed off in 2016 as part of the DC Rebirth relaunch. She has since been revived by Darkseid as of the Darkseid vs The World one shot

== Fictional character biography ==
=== Pre-Crisis ===
Pandora first appears in New Comics #5 (June 1936). Pandora was a woman who was constructed long ago by Hephaestus and blessed by the Olympian Gods under order of Zeus to act as the living embodiment of all that is woman. Pandora was eventually given a box by Zeus as a keepsake to be presented to her mate which she was charged with never opening under any conditions. Pandora eventually chose Epimetheus as her mate and convinced him to open the box which released great evils onto the world while containing the force of Hope within the box. Pandora was eventually forced to wander the lands as a reviled figure until she was assimilated back into Earth by Gaea at her behest.

=== Flashpoint and New 52 ===
Pandora first appears in Flashpoint #5 (October 2011), the conclusion to the "Flashpoint" event. She is responsible for causing the Flash to merge three separate timelines (the DC Universe, the Wildstorm Universe and select Vertigo titles) in order to create the new universe that is seen in the publications of The New 52. After this storyline, Pandora made a cameo appearance in the first issue of each initial New 52 title. Pandora was not named until January 2012, when Bob Harras posted a teaser on DC Comics' blog, stating her name.

Pandora next appeared having a dialogue with the Phantom Stranger. It was revealed that the two have a connection, via the Circle of Eternity, who had cursed them to walk the Earth forever yet unable to get involved.

The origins of Pandora and those who would become The Question and the Phantom Stranger are later explained. Summoned to the Rock of Eternity by the Circle of Eternity, the three are labeled as the "Trinity of Sin" and are each given a punishment. For opening a box and releasing the evil contents, Pandora was sentenced to an eternity of loneliness, pain and being told that she is evil. It is also revealed that she had re-obtained her box from A.R.G.U.S.'s Black Room, where it had been stored along with various other mystical items.

The last wizard of the Council of Eternity later appears before Pandora and tells her that she did not deserve the punishment that she was given. When Pandora questions him on how to open the box, he states that "only the strongest of heart or the darkest... can open the box and claim its power... and can transform the..." before disappearing in a bolt of lightning. Pandora's own series was only 14 issues plus a New 52's Future's End one-shot.

Pandora's box was later revealed, in Forever Evil, not to be a mystical artifact at all, but a device for accessing Earth-3, underlining Pandora's innocence. Pandora recurred throughout the Forever Evil: Blight crossover event, taking place in Constantine, the Trinity of Sin titles and Justice League Dark. After visiting Heaven with the Justice League Dark, Pandora begins to understand more about her true nature, which has something to do with lights, and she uncovers an ability to manifest herself in a much more powerful, golden angel form. Ultimately, her discovery of these powers is instrumental in defeating Blight, a powerful evil entity made up of humanity's dark side and potential for evil.

In Trinity of Sin — Pandora: Futures-End, it is revealed that the "Seven Deadly Sins" are in reality part of Pandora herself and that they are part of an unending cycle that ended with one of the Sins being victorious and causing the multiverse to collapse and restart. This time, however, the part of Pandora that is Hope wins and ends the cycle.

In the DC Universe 80-page Rebirth special, Pandora is murdered and disintegrated by a mysterious assailant after she implies that he was the one responsible for all of the sins for which she had been blamed.

== Powers and abilities ==
Pandora's powers consist of immortality, magic and supernatural knowledge. She is skilled in martial arts and is also a weapons expert, having access to magical weaponry. She is omnilingual as well.

== Collected issues ==
Title	Page count	Material collected	Publication date	ISBN	Ref
New 52 (2011–2016)
Justice League: Trinity War	320	Collects Justice League Vol. 2 #22–23, Justice League of America Vol. 3 #6–7, Justice League Dark #22–23, Constantine #5, Trinity of Sin: Pandora #1–3, Trinity of Sin: The Phantom Stranger Vol. 4 #11	March 12, 2014	978-1-4012-4519-1	
Forever Evil: Blight	400	Collects Justice League Dark (vol. 1) #24–29, Constantine #9–12, Trinity of Sin: Pandora #6–9, Trinity of Sin: Phantom Stranger (vol. 1) #14–17	September 24, 2014	978-1-4012-5006-5	
Trinity of Sin - Pandora Vol. 1: The Curse	144	Collects Trinity of Sin: Pandora #1-5, material from Justice League (vol. 2) #0, #6, and The New 52 Free Comic Book Day Special Edition #1	March 25, 2014	978-1-4012-4524-5	
Trinity of Sin - Pandora Vol. 2: Choices	224	Collects Trinity of Sin: Pandora #6-14, Trinity of Sin: Pandora: Futures End #1	December 2, 2014	978-1-4012-5013-3	
