= Phantom Stranger =

Fictional comic book character

- Cover of The Phantom Stranger (vol. 4) #4 (January 2013), art by Ethan Van Sciver.

Publication information
- Publisher: DC Comics/Vertigo
- First appearance: Phantom Stranger #1 (August/September 1952)
- Created by: John Broome (writer); Carmine Infantino (artist)

In-story information
- Alter ego: Judas Iscariot
- Species: Human
- Team affiliations: The Quintessence; Lords of Order; Justice League Dark; Council of Immortals; The Trenchcoat Brigade; Sentinels of Magic
- Partnerships: The Spectre; The Presence
- Notable aliases: The Spirit of Justice, Philip Stark, Grey Walker, Brotherless One
- Abilities: List: Magic mastery; Conjuration; Summoning; Invoking; Transmutation; Transformation; Reality alteration; Dimensional travel; Psychic powers; Immortality; Cosmic awareness; Existence erasure; Space-time manipulation; Nigh-omnipotence; Omniscience; Oneiromancy

The Phantom Stranger is a superhero appearing in American comic books published by DC Comics. Debuting in Phantom Stranger #1 (August/September 1952), he was created by John Broome and Carmine Infantino. The character is of supernatural origin, battling mysterious occult forces, sometimes under their Vertigo imprint.

Originally having a mysterious origin, the character often appeared as spiritual advisor and guide for dilemmas of both spiritual and supernatural origin. Frequently battling demonic forces, the Phantom Stranger was once characterized as an agent for the Lords of Order that sought to prevent chaotic forces from prevailing and was only known to work to atone for a great sin. Speculated to be a fallen angel or the Wandering Jew, the Phantom Stranger was later revealed to be Judas Iscariot. He was punished by the Circle of Eternity (at the behest of God) for his betrayal of Jesus Christ, cursed to see the world but never being a part of it while atoning for his sins. An eternal servant of God, the Phantom Stranger is also an important member of the Quintessence, a council of supremely powerful beings that witnesses events of the multiverse but do not directly intervene.

The Phantom Stranger made his first live-action appearance in the 2019 DC Universe television series Swamp Thing, portrayed by Macon Blair. Additionally, Kevin Conroy, D. B. Woodside, and Peter Serafinowicz have voiced the character in animation.

== Publication history ==
=== Volume 1 ===
The Phantom Stranger first appeared in an eponymous six-issue comics anthology published in 1952 and was created by John Broome and Carmine Infantino.

=== Volume 2 ===
After an appearance in Showcase #80 (February 1969), he received another series beginning May–June 1969 that lasted until February–March 1976. The Showcase appearance and the first three issues of Phantom Stranger consisted of reprints from both the 1950s title and the "Dr. 13: Ghost-Breaker" feature from the last nine issues of Star Spangled Comics at the same time, with new, brief framing sequences. These had Dr. Thirteen, certain that the Phantom Stranger was an impostor, determined to expose him.

Beginning with issue #4 (November-December 1969), the series began featuring all-new material, with stories produced by Robert Kanigher, Len Wein, Jim Aparo, Neal Adams, Tony DeZuniga and others. In these stories, while the Stranger's past remained a mystery, the writers added a semi-regular cast of characters for him. A demonic sorceress named Tala would become his archenemy; an alchemist/sorcerer named Tannarak was first an enemy and would later assist him against the Dark Circle; and a blind psychic named Cassandra Craft would assist him. The stories hinted at a romantic attraction between the Stranger and Craft, but he eventually left her, deciding she could not be part of his life, convincing her he had been killed in their final battle against the Dark Circle. She eventually learned differently and turned up occasionally. Doctor Thirteen, dropped along with the reprints, was given a back-up series here as of #12 (March-April 1971) which morphed into "The Spawn of Frankenstein" in #23 (January-February 1973).

The second volume originally ended with the forty-first issue in November 1975, cover dated March 1976. In January 2010, a forty-second issue was added to the second series during the Blackest Night event, effectively a one-shot.

=== Saga of the Swamp Thing ===
A backup series in Saga of the Swamp Thing #1-13 featured the Phantom Stranger. Most of those short stories were written by Mike W. Barr; one was written by Paul Levitz. These were mostly morality tales in the style of The Phantom Stranger vol. 2, without connections to the character's Bronze Age continuity with Batman or the Justice League. One two-part story explicitly connected with the continuity of vol. 2, continuing the story of Tannarak.

After the backup series ended with #13, the Stranger appeared in the main story of Saga of the Swamp Thing #14. After Saga of the Swamp Thing became Swamp Thing volume 2 written by Alan Moore, the Stranger became an occasional recurring character, as Swamp Thing became more involved with the afterlife and the mystical world.

=== Volume 3 ===
The Stranger also starred in a miniseries in 1987. This series portrayed him as an agent of the Lords of Order. They temporarily stripped the Stranger of his powers, due to his desire to continue a battle against the Lords of Chaos. This went against the wishes of the Lords of Order, who had believed a victory by darkness over light was necessary and preordained. This series featured Eclipso as an agent of Chaos.

=== Action Comics Weekly ===
During the period 1988-89 when Action Comics became the anthology Action Comics Weekly, one rotating strip featured The Phantom Stranger. It explicitly continued the continuity of The Phantom Stranger Volume 2.

The story of Volume 2 and the Action Comics Weekly strip was resolved in Neil Gaiman's proposed story concluding the whole of Action Comics Weekly. This was published years later as the non-canonical in Green Lantern/Superman: Legend of the Green Flame. In this story, the Stranger claims that he belongs to no group, including the servants of the Lords of Order. The Lords of Order threaten to strip him of his powers, and he leaves, claiming that he shall continue to wander.

=== Volume 4 ===
The Phantom Stranger received a new ongoing series in September 2012 written by Dan DiDio and drawn by Brent Anderson. This series was retitled as Trinity of Sin: The Phantom Stranger as of issue #9 (Aug. 2013) and cancelled as of #22 (Oct. 2014).

=== Justice League membership status ===
The Phantom Stranger is better known for his role as a supernatural assistant to other heroes, such as the Justice League. His status as either a full, reserve, or honorary member of the League is debatable. After a vote of the majority of the team in Justice League of America #103, they offered him membership, with Superman declaring the Stranger "a member" without qualification, though he left before accepting. This issue was part of an unofficial metafictional crossover with Marvel Comics, spanning titles from both of the major comics companies. Beginning in Marvel's Amazing Adventures #16 (by Steve Englehart with art by Bob Brown and Frank McLaughlin), the story continued in DC's Justice League of America #103 (by Len Wein, Dick Dillin and Dick Giordano), and is concluded in Thor #207 (by Gerry Conway and penciler John Buscema). Each comic featured writers Englehart, Conway, and Wein, as well as Wein's first wife Glynis, interacting with Marvel or DC characters at the Rutland Halloween Parade in Rutland, Vermont. The Phantom Stranger has at least twice asserted his membership status when other Leaguers challenged his input, during the vote on the League's re-admission of Wonder Woman and during the crossover with The Avengers. In contrast, many in-story accounts of League membership fail to include the Stranger; when Zatanna was admitted as a member, Superman and Hawkman clarified that the 12-member limit in the League's charter had been rewritten previously to admit Hawkgirl as the 13th. Wein commented on the Phantom Stranger's relationship with the JLA in a 2012 interview stating that the character "only sort of joined. He was offered membership but vanished, as per usual, without actually accepting the offer. Over the years, other writers have just assumed [he] was a member, but in my world, he never really said yes".

== Fictional character biography ==
=== Origin ===
Unusually for a comic book character of such longevity, nothing in the way of personal data about the Phantom Stranger—his real name, his true nature, or his origins—has ever been revealed. In 1987, DC produced a special issue of Secret Origins (vol. 2, #10) that postulated four possible origins:

1. In a variation of the Wandering Jew story, he was a man named Isaac with a wife (Rebecca) and a young son in Bethlehem during the time of Jesus' childhood. When King Herod heard that there was born a child who would be king of the Jews, he orders the Massacre of the Innocents to kill Jesus. Among the people killed were Isaac's wife and son. Blind with anger, he spends the next 30 years raging against Jesus. During the Passion of Jesus, Isaac bribes a guard to let him take his place and participate in the flagellation of Christ. Jesus condemns Isaac to "tarry in this world - until I come again". Centuries after the crucifixion, Isaac repents. He has spent his life helping mankind ever since, evidently finding the task so agreeably fulfilling that in the present day, he politely declines an offer from God to release him from his penance.
2. The Stranger was a man in Biblical times who was spared God's wrath by an angel. Questioning God's actions, he commits suicide. The angel forbids his spirit from entering the afterlife, reanimates his body, and erases all memories of his past life. He then discovers his divine charge: to turn humanity away from evil, one soul at a time.
3. The Phantom Stranger is a being caught in a time loop. Near the end of the universe, he approaches several scientists who are trying to transfer energy from the Big Bang to extend the universe's lifespan and stops one of the scientists, who is an avatar of Anti-Life and attempting to destroy the universe. The story concludes with the Phantom Stranger passing a portion of himself to a scientist, who becomes his successor.
4. The Phantom Stranger was a fallen angel who sided with neither Heaven nor Hell during Lucifer's rebellion and thus was condemned to walk the Earth. In the comic book miniseries The Trenchcoat Brigade, John Constantine sees that the fourth origin story is essentially correct. Vertigo Visions: Phantom Stranger #1 by Alisa Kwitney and Guy Davis builds upon Alan Moore's fallen angel story from Secret Origins and adds the story of a woman called Naamah, who was condemned to Hell for loving an angel. This angel is implied to have become the Phantom Stranger.

Another possible origin was hinted at in The Kingdom (the sequel to Kingdom Come) in which it was implied that Jonathan Kent, the future son of Superman and Wonder Woman, might grow up to be the Phantom Stranger. This also tied some of his abilities into the Hypertime concept, giving him the innate ability to enter alternate timelines and to exist in the spaces between them. The story ultimately revealed this to be a red herring. The character in question had been deliberately drawn in shadows to suggest that he was the Stranger, but when Wonder Woman finally saw his face, she said that she now realized he was not the Stranger they knew.

His appearances in titles featuring Doctor Fate state that the Stranger was a servant of the Lords of Order during the Ninth Age of Magic (at least). This may be a later development unrelated to his actual origin.

The one-shot Vertigo Visions: The Phantom Stranger (1993) written by Alisa Kwitney suggests another origin for the Stranger, drawing on Jewish Talmudic and Kabbalistic stories: that he was an angel who sinned by impregnating the demon Naamah; their child was the demon Asmodeus. The story does appear to be in continuity with Vertigo's Sandman series, but the continuity status of the Vertigo line relative to the mainline DC Comics Universe was unclear and inconsistent in this era.

In the fourth volume of Phantom Stranger (2012), the Phantom Stranger is Judas Iscariot. He is judged by the Circle of Eternity, who are implied to be proxies for a higher power. The Stranger is condemned to eternally walk Earth as an agent of God. He wears a necklace made of the thirty pieces of silver which he took as payment for betraying Jesus. When the Stranger facilitates the transformation of Jim Corrigan into the Spectre, one of the coins falls from the necklace and crumbles, bringing him one step closer to redemption.

=== Depictions by different writers ===
The character in his first appearance (Phantom Stranger #1, 1952 art by Carmine Infantino & Sy Barry).

In his earliest appearances, the Phantom Stranger would prove supernatural events to be hoaxes perpetrated by criminals. He would directly confront the villains, and displayed no supernatural abilities apart perhaps from his uncanny ability to appear where and when he is needed and to disappear just as mysteriously, with nobody seeing him coming or going. In later stories, the supernatural events were real and the Phantom Stranger was given unspecified supernatural powers of his own to defeat them. For example, he was able to control a smoke-based sedative with a gesture, claiming that smoke itself is his ally.

In his second comic book series, the Phantom Stranger became a truly supernatural hero.

The Phantom Stranger played a major part in Neil Gaiman's The Books of Magic, taking protagonist Tim Hunter through time to show him the history and nature of magic. He has assisted the Justice League on numerous occasions, even being formally elected to the group in Justice League of America #103, although he did not acknowledge his membership until Justice League of America #143. The Stranger also had his own limited series, where, lacking much of his power, he tries to foil Eclipso's plan to cause a nuclear war.

During Kevin Smith's relaunch of Green Arrow, he prevented Hal Jordan from uniting the resurrected body of Oliver Queen with his soul in Heaven. This earned him Jordan's wrath; indeed, the Spectre threatened to judge the Stranger to see whether God had "punished" him properly by refusing him access to Heaven itself. Nonetheless, the Phantom Stranger assisted Jordan during his tenure as the Spectre on numerous occasions as well, most notably in a short stint babysitting his niece Helen.

In 2005's Day of Vengeance, the Phantom Stranger had been turned into a mouse by the Spectre. Upon the Spectre's confrontation and battle with the Stranger, the Stranger states: "You can't kill me. I doubt that the universe would allow it". He was still able to advise Detective Chimp, however, who sheltered him in his hat while he regained his powers. He changed back using recovered energies in Day of Vengeance #6 and aided the Shadowpact, allowing them to see the battle between the Spectre and Shazam. The series makes a point that the supernatural community generally regards the Phantom Stranger as invincible. The first reaction of some characters to the Spectre's assault on magic is simply to presume that the Stranger will take care of it. Other stories have shown the Stranger to be nearly as powerful as the Spectre.

In Day of Vengeance: Infinite Crisis Special #1, the Phantom Stranger works with Nabu, Doctor Occult, Zatanna, the Shadowpact, and other mystics to re-form the Rock of Eternity and help defeat the maddened Spectre.

The Phantom Stranger's relationships with the other mystic heroes are usually tense. The Stranger has no qualms gathering various forces to combat evil, often invading those people's personal lives. However, he does not usually extend them that same courtesy. The Phantom Stranger has resisted such people as Doctor Fate (notably Hector Hall) in this, although Doctor Fate is, in almost any incarnation, an ally of the Stranger. Despite this, he does get along well with Zatanna; in Justice League of America #6, he appeared by her side to help remove the influence of Faust on the Red Tornado, and in the Justice series he seems to have a fatherly affection for her, calling her "my dear".

Since he is ultimately an unpredictable force, others often meet the Phantom Stranger's appearance with distrust. Nonetheless, most heroes will follow him, seeing not only his immense power, but also knowing that the Stranger is, in the end, a force for good. He has generally shown to side with humanity first in many supernatural-based problems, such as when he aided Superman in a confrontation with the magician Arion, who attempted to force Superman to retire in the belief that Superman and other alien heroes would hold back the 'darkness' that would make civilization—Arion describing human history as existing in a cycle that would allow humanity to develop to a certain point before they collapsed and had to start again—for so long that it would destroy humanity when it came. Although the Stranger acknowledged that the future Arion had foreseen, where Earth was completely destroyed by Khyber due to Superman delaying him for so long that he only struck at his peak, was possible, he also told Superman to keep fighting to find another way as the cost in souls and experience if Arion succeeded would be too great. A notable exception to the heroes who will work with the Stranger is Madame Xanadu, who has refused to join the Stranger on a few occasions, although she is a member of his Sentinels of Magic. Eventually, it was revealed that Madame Xanadu's hatred for the Phantom Stranger stems from his involvement in the events costing young Nimue her powers and heritage, and turning the young fey into the immortal yet powerless clairvoyant.

The Stranger also holds a unique relationship with the Spectre, as the two forces often come into conflict. He was responsible for gathering a group of mystic heroes to combat the Spectre, when its human host Jim Corrigan seemingly lost control of the Spectre. It was during this time that they destroyed the country of Vlatava. The Phantom Stranger participated in Jim Corrigan's funeral, when Corrigan's soul finally earned its rest and left the Spectre. The Stranger subsequently became one of the forces that stood against the Spectre when it went on a rampage without its human host, until the soul of Hal Jordan bonded with it. The Stranger occasionally took on an advisory role for this new Spectre. In Infinite Crisis #6, aware that the Spectre now has yet another new host, the Phantom Stranger gathered a large group of magic wielders in an unsuccessful attempt to solicit the Spectre's assistance in the Crisis.

In the Madame Xanadu series, the first encounter between the then-young and innocent Nimue, as Xanadu was known in the Arthurian Age, and the Phantom Stranger himself is told. There, Nimue acknowledges his unearthly nature, describing him as "Ageless and yet so...uneasy", and claiming, "You're not human! Nor are you of the Ancient Folk! Nor fey creature. Nor...nor demon..." Before Nimue is able to grasp his nature, the Stranger goes away, claiming to be "compelled to counsel and yet forbidden to interfere in the course of history".

The Phantom Stranger serves as the narrator of Shadowpact. He is shown to be aware of the mystical happenings, not only on Earth, but across several dimensions; once again he is shown to be unable to interfere, no matter how dire the danger that he is aware of may be.

=== Blackest Night ===
In Blackest Night #2, Black Hand refers to the Phantom Stranger as neither dead nor alive, meaning he cannot be killed, resurrected, or turned into a Black Lantern. The Stranger watches as a black power ring attaches itself to Crispus Allen's body, turning him into a Black Lantern, and sealing the Spectre within him. In the tie-in one-shot revival of Phantom Stranger #42, the Stranger, with the help of Blue Devil, attempts to fight the Black Lantern Spectre, but fails. The two then travel to Nanda Parbat, where the Stranger helps Deadman remove the black ring from his body. The Stranger has the body brought into Nanda Parbat and placed under guard, stating that it is of "singular importance".

=== The New 52 ===
In DC Comics - The New 52 FCBD Special Edition #1 as part of The New 52 (a reboot of the DC Comics universe), the Phantom Stranger is implied to be Judas Iscariot and part of the Trinity of Sin with Pandora and the Question. While not named explicitly, the necklace he wears is presumed to be made from the 30 pieces of silver that he received for his betrayal of Jesus Christ. His hair and eyes become totally white from the experience.

Phantom Stranger (vol. 4) #0 confirmed that Phantom Stranger was once Judas Iscariot, the man who betrayed Jesus. In this origin tale he is about to hang himself when his suicide attempt is stopped by a mysterious group of individuals. He is subsequently judged along with Pandora and another man who was turned into the Question. Thousands of years later, he is guided to help desperate former detective Jim Corrigan find his kidnapped girlfriend. He leads him to the abandoned warehouse where she has been kept, but this turns out to be a trap. Corrigan is killed by the kidnappers, then transforms into the Spectre and accuses the Stranger of betraying him. As the Spectre is about to attack the Stranger, a mysterious Voice sends him off to inflict his wrath on the more deserving. As payment for what occurred with Corrigan, one coin drops off the necklace he was cursed with (made of the 30 pieces of silver he betrayed Jesus for) and the Stranger realizes he has more encounters ahead of him before he is forgiven.

Pandora meets the Phantom Stranger and tells him she needs his help to find the person who can open her box. He refuses, reminding her of the last time the box was opened, when the sins of the world were unleashed. To this, she responds that she only wants to save everyone from what she unleashed. John Constantine tries to con the Phantom Stranger to join the Justice League Dark by promising to return one of the coins bound to him through his punishment. The Phantom Stranger rejects the offer, but Constantine feels he will eventually come around and be on the Justice League Dark's side. The Question manipulates Doctor Thirteen to impale the Phantom Stranger with the Spear of Destiny. The Phantom Stranger is left on the door to the House of Mystery, and the Justice League Dark attempt to revive him, summoning the Nightmare Nurse. Once they do revive him, the Phantom Stranger states that they are all in his debt and asks the Justice League Dark (specifically Zatanna) to help him enter Hell to save his family. Zauriel warns the Phantom Stranger that he is never allowed to enter Heaven again, having gone to Hell to try to save his family. Zauriel also states to the Phantom Stranger that if he tries, he will be erased from time and history forever.

== Powers and abilities ==
An archmage due to being a higher being or is considered enchanted himself, the Phantom Stranger's powers are considered undefined and mysterious, stated to have mystical properties that defies classification; possessing magical powers and limited command over natural forces, his powers first originated from empowerment as Lords of Order before later drawing strength from the collective strength of humanity. An immortal being, his magical powers allows for example flight, teleportation, energy-projection, invisibility, transformation, time manipulation, and size alteration. He also possesses considerable knowledge of the DC Multiverse, including its pasts, present, and futures.

While powerful, the Phantom Stranger possess no innate superhuman attributes, allowing him to be taken down by physical attacks (especially if taken by surprise), once demonstrated during an altercation with Wonder Woman. The character can also be overcome by those with greater supernatural power, which has included characters such the Spectre and magic originating from Garn Daanuth. The character is also not all knowing, not being completely aware of details regarding Alec Holland's transformation into Swamp Thing.

== Other versions ==
- An alternate universe version of the Phantom Stranger appears in DC: The New Frontier #6.
- The Phantom Stranger appears in Scooby-Doo! Team Up #13.
- In Absolute Superman #18, the Phantom Stranger has been reimagined as a woman who first appears in Ancient Egypt and gives the prophecy of a savior(later deduced to be Superman by Carter Hall) who would come to overthrow the oppressors and bring about an age of heroes.

== Collected editions ==
=== Golden, Silver, and Bronze Ages (1952–1976) ===
Title	Page count	Material collected	Publication date	ISBN	Ref
Phantom Stranger Vol. 1 and 2
Showcase Presents: Phantom Stranger (Vol. 1)	544	Showcase #80; and Phantom Stranger (vol. 2) #1-21	October 2006	978-1401210885	
Showcase Presents: Phantom Stranger (Vol. 2)	552	Phantom Stranger (vol. 2) #22-41, Justice League of America #103; House of Secrets #150; The Brave and the Bold #89, 98, and the Frankenstein stories from Phantom Stranger (vol. 2) #23-30	March 2008	978-1401217228	
Phantom Stranger Omnibus	1,136	Showcase #80, Phantom Stranger (vol. 1) #1-6; Phantom Stranger (vol. 2) #1-41; Justice League of America #103; House of Secrets #150; The Brave and the Bold #89, 98, 145; backups from The Saga of the Swamp Thing #1-13; "Secret Origins(vol.2)" #10; DC Super Stars #18; DC Comics Presents #25, 72; Who's Who: The Definitive Directory of the DC Universe #18	May 2022	978-1779506030	
Blackest Night: Rise of the Black Lanterns	256	The Atom and Hawkman #46; The Question #37; Phantom Stranger (vol. 2) #42; Starman (vol. 2) #81; The Power of Shazam! #48; Catwoman (vol. 3) #83; Weird Western Tales #71; Green Arrow (vol. 4) #30; and Adventure Comics (vol. 2) #7	July 2010; Aug 2011	1-4012-2789-9; 1-401228062	

=== The New 52 (2012–2014) ===
Title	Page count	Material collected	Publication date	ISBN	Ref
Phantom Stranger Vol. 4
Trinity of Sin: Phantom Stranger Vol. 1: A Stranger Among Us	144	Phantom Stranger (vol. 4) #0–5	June 2013	ISBN 978-1401240882	
Trinity of Sin - The Phantom Stranger Vol. 2: Breach of Faith	14	Phantom Stranger (vol. 4) #6–8; and Trinity of Sin: Phantom Stranger(vol. 4) #9–11	March 2014	ISBN 978-1401247140	
Justice League: Trinity War	320	Justice League Vol. 2 #22–23, Justice League of America Vol. 3 #6–7, Justice League Dark #22–23, Constantine #5, Trinity of Sin: Pandora #1–3, Trinity of Sin: The Phantom Stranger Vol. 4 #11	March 12, 2014	ISBN 978-1-4012-4519-1	
Forever Evil: Blight	400	Justice League Dark (vol. 1) #24–29, Constantine #9–12, Trinity of Sin: Pandora #6–9, Trinity of Sin: Phantom Stranger (vol. 1) #14–17	September 24, 2014		
Trinity of Sin - Phantom Stranger Vol. 3: The Crack in Creation	264	Trinity of Sin: Phantom Stranger (vol. 4) #12-22 and Trinity of Sin: Futures End #1	January 2015	ISBN 978-1401250966	

== In other media ==
=== Television ===
- The Phantom Stranger appears in the Batman: The Brave and the Bold episode "Chill of the Night!", voiced by Kevin Conroy.
- The Phantom Stranger appears in Swamp Thing, portrayed by Macon Blair.
- The Phantom Stranger appears in Young Justice, voiced by D. B. Woodside.

=== Film ===
The Phantom Stranger appears in DC Showcase: The Phantom Stranger, voiced by Peter Serafinowicz.

=== Video games ===
- The Phantom Stranger appears as a non-playable character in DC Universe Online.
- The Phantom Stranger appears as a character summon in Scribblenauts Unmasked: A DC Comics Adventure.
- The Phantom Stranger appears as a non-playable character in DC Legends.

=== Music ===
The song "Return of the Phantom Stranger" appears on Rob Zombie's Hellbilly Deluxe (1998) album.

=== Miscellaneous ===
- Bruce Timm had intended to utilize the Phantom Stranger in the DC Animated Universe, but was not allowed to do so. However, Timm's design for the character appears in several tie-in comics.
- The Phantom Stranger appears in the novel DC Universe: Trail of Time, by Jeff Mariotte.
- The Phantom Stranger appears in the Scribblenauts Unmasked tie-in comic Scribblenauts Unmasked: A Crisis of Imagination.
- The Phantom Stranger appears in the novel The Flash Crossover Crisis: Legends Of Forever, by Barry Lyga.
