= Outsider (comics) =

The Outsider
- Cover of Detective Comics #356, the first on panel appearance of the Outsider.

Publication information
- Publisher: DC Comics
- First appearance: Pre-Crisis Outsider: Detective Comics #334 (December 1964); Michael Desai: Flashpoint: The Outsider #1 (August 2011); The Outsider/Alfred Pennyworth of Earth-3: Justice League (vol. 2) #6 (April 2012)
- Created by: Pre-Crisis version: Gardner Fox (writer); Carmine Infantino (artist); Michael Desai: James Robinson (writer); Javi Fernandez (artist); Outsider/Alfred Pennyworth of Earth-3: Geoff Johns (writer); Jim Lee (artist)

In-story information
- Species: Metahuman
- Abilities: Alfred Pennyworth: Telekinesis; Michael Desai: Superhuman strength and durability

The Outsider is the name of three characters appearing in American comic books published by DC Comics. The first is an evil persona that Alfred Pennyworth assumes after nearly dying and becoming amnesiac. The second, Michael Desai, is an Indian metahuman and businessman introduced during the Flashpoint storyline. The third is Alfred's Earth-Three counterpart.

== Publication history ==
The Pre-Crisis version of the Outsider first appeared as an unseen character in Detective Comics #334 and was created by Gardner Fox and Carmine Infantino.

The Flashpoint version of the Outsider first appeared in Flashpoint: The Outsider #1 and was created by James Robinson and Javi Fernandez.

The Earth-3 Outsider first appeared in Justice League (vol. 2) #6 and was created by Geoff Johns and Jim Lee.

== Fictional character biography ==
=== Pre-Crisis ===
Alfred Pennyworth is seemingly killed when he pushes Batman and Robin out of the way of a boulder. It is later revealed that Alfred was revived by scientist Brandon Crawford; the healing process gave him pale skin, telekinesis, and the desire to destroy Batman and Robin. Calling himself the Outsider, he indirectly battles the Dynamic Duo. Outsider sends coffins with Batman and Robin automata to deliver the message to Bruce Wayne and Dick Grayson. Tracking the delivery of the coffins, they have to battle off the Grasshopper Gang, then find fingerprints belonging to the Outsider and link them to Alfred Pennyworth. Batman and Robin track down the Outsider to his hideout and battle him to a standstill. Batman puts him on a machine which bombards him with radiation once more. This restores Alfred to health and normality, with no memory of his Outsider identity.

=== Flashpoint ===
A new version of the Outsider appears in the Flashpoint reality. Michael Desai was born in Chandigarh, India and possesses pale skin and superhuman strength and durability. After his mother dies during childbirth, for which he is blamed, Desai creates a sinkhole that kills thousands of people and leaves him the only survivor. Years later, Desai assumes the alias of "the Outsider" (as he is both "outside" the law and the human race) and accumulates considerable wealth through illegal activities. This allows Desai to elevate India's status as a world power, turning the country into a multinational criminal operation completely under his control. Desai is revealed to have a degree of longevity, since he is shown to be active in Indian criminal and political affairs since the late 1970s.

=== The New 52 ===
In 2011, "The New 52" rebooted the DC universe. a man known as the Outsider is introduced as the leader/benefactor of the Secret Society of Super Villains, where he was depicted as a pale man clad in purple. The Secret Society's origins are first seen in Justice League #6 when Professor Ivo and the "Outsider" meet to discuss the growing superhero community.

The Outsider, having captured Madame Xanadu, tells her that the Justice Leagues and the Trinity of Sin are all pieces in his game. Xanadu retorts that she does not need to see the future to know that the Justice League will defeat him, to which he replies that he has already won since he has a mole in the Justice League. The Outsider recounts how he arrived on Prime Earth. During the Justice League's battle with Darkseid, the barriers between universes was weakened, which allowed him and another individual to escape their world, but his master did not make it. Ever since, he began recruiting many of the League's enemies to create the Secret Society in preparation for his master's arrival, searched for Pandora's box, and planted an agent within the Justice League. He gets his hands on the box and tells the heroes that the box is not magic, but science, that was created on his world and can only be opened by someone from his world. He explains that the box opens a gateway to another universe, his homeworld; the birthplace of evil. It is revealed that the Outsider is actually from Earth-Three and is that world's version of Alfred Pennyworth.

== See also ==
- List of Batman family enemies
