= Constantine (comic book) =

2013–2015 comic book series

- Constantine #1 (Mar 2013 DC Comics); Art by Juan Jose Ryp.

Publication information
- Publisher: DC Comics
- Format: Ongoing series
- Publication date: 2013–2015
- Main character: John Constantine

Creative team
- Written by: Robert Venditti; Jeff Lemire; Ray Fawkes
- Artist(s): Renato Guedes; Jeremy Haun

Constantine is a former ongoing comic book series published by DC Comics, which started in March 2013. It features English Magician John Constantine reestablished into the DC Universe and replaces the former Vertigo Comics title Hellblazer, which ended with its 300th issue after 25 years in February 2013. The title character was originally created by Alan Moore in his 1980s run on Swamp Thing. The series received mixed reviews; writers praised its story but were critical of its characters, setting, and artwork. Many were disappointed that the series replaced Hellblazer, with writer Joshua Hale Fialkov stating the series did not have the "real" John Constantine.

== Publication history ==
In September 2011, The New 52 rebooted DC's continuity. In this new timeline, Constantine is reintroduced as a younger version, rather than the previous incarnation in his early 60s, as the leader of Justice League Dark.

On November 8, 2012, DC announced that its long running series Hellblazer would be canceled following its 300th issue, and would be replaced by a standalone Constantine series, to be written by Robert Venditti and drawn by Renato Guides, but changed before first publication to writer Jeff Lemire as a co-plotter, with Ray Fawkes scripting the book. Both writers also worked on the Justice League Dark series.

The series ended at issue #23 and was relaunched as Constantine: The Hellblazer, written by Ming Doyle and James Tynion IV, in June 2015.

== Reception ==
The announcement was met largely with disappointment from the industry, even by DC's own creators, with I, Vampire writer Joshua Hale Fialkov expressing sadness he would never get to write the "'real' John Constantine", noted crime author and former Hellblazer writer Ian Rankin stating Constantine was the only comic book character he ever wanted to write for, and comic writer, Leah Moore expressing doubt that Constantine could replace Hellblazer, among others. As a result, DC co-publisher Dan Didio issued a statement defending this decision, stating that, "Hellblazer's had a long and incredibly successful run and that's a tip of the hat to all the great creators that have worked on the book over the years. The new Constantine series will return him back to his roots in the DCU and hopefully be the start of another incredible run." Constantine has received mixed reviews from critics, praising the story but criticizing its characters, setting, and artwork. Comic Book Resources calls it "a story that would have fit in with the pre-Vertigo branding of the title" and praised the character's roots but criticized the artwork for being too "bright".

== Collected editions ==
The series has been collected into the following trade paperbacks:

- Constantine Vol. 1: The Spark and the Flame (Constantine #1–6)
- Constantine Vol. 2: Blight (Constantine #7–12)
- Constantine Vol. 3: The Voice in the Fire (Constantine #13–17, Constantine: Future's End #1)
- Constantine Vol. 4: The Apocalypse Road (Constantine #18–23)
