= Superwoman (Crime Syndicate) =

- Earth-Three Pre-Crisis Superwoman, in Convergence: Crime Syndicate #1 (April 2015). Art by Phil Winslade (pencils and inks) and Lovern Kindzierski (colors).

Publication information
- Publisher: DC Comics
- First appearance: Justice League of America #29 (August 1964)
- Created by: Gardner Fox; Mike Sekowsky

In-story information
- Alter ego: Diana / Lois Lane
- Species: Amazon
- Place of origin: Damnation Island (anti-matter analog of Paradise Island)
- Team affiliations: Crime Syndicate
- Partnerships: Ultraman; Owlman; Johnny Quick; Power Ring
- Abilities: Superhuman strength, speed, healing; Flight; Magical weaponry, Lasso of Submission (Earth-3 version of the Lasso of Truth), a weaponized tiara, and a magical sword.

Superwoman of the Crime Syndicate of America is a supervillain appearing in stories published by DC Comics. One of several characters to use the name Superwoman in DC, she is an alternate-universe counterpart of Wonder Woman.

== Publication history ==
The character first appeared in Justice League of America #29 (August 1964).

== Fictional character biography ==
=== Pre-Crisis ===
In 1964, an evil counterpart of Wonder Woman from a parallel universe named "Superwoman" was introduced. This Superwoman is a member of the Crime Syndicate of America, a villainous counterpart of the Justice League of America from the parallel world of "Earth-Three" (vs. the Justice League's world of "Earth-One"). Superwoman, like Wonder Woman, is an Amazon, and possesses similar powers of super-strength and flight. Unlike most/all other versions, her golden lasso can change shape into any form she desires, including a giant winged serpent. The Crime Syndicate first comes to Earth-1 to battle the Justice League when, after near capture, they feel they need a real challenge to their powers.

Superwoman is defeated by Wonder Woman on Earth-1 when both deploy their lassos with Wonder Woman's proving itself the superior of the two. However each Crime Syndicate member has a fail-safe that transports them and the victorious Justice League member to Earth-3. Another battle ensues and this time Wonder Woman falls victim to Superwoman's lasso. The Syndicate puts the League into a trance on Earth-1 while they prepare to battle the Justice Society of America on Earth-2, an Earth that will provide a neutral location for a final battle.

Superwoman is again defeated by the host Earth's heroine, this time Black Canary, who is able to use Superwoman's strength against her and encircles her with her own lasso. Another fail-safe transports them to Earth-3 where Black Canary and the rest of the Justice Society are imprisoned. Superwoman and Wonder Woman have a final showdown on Earth-2 where neither has a home Earth advantage. Superwoman yanks Wonder Woman's lasso from her and proceeds to hurl both ropes at her rival, ensuring Wonder Woman will not be able to make a move against her, but is surprised when the ropes sail high, realizing it takes more super-strength to control both lassos. Wonder Woman, having anticipated this, lets her lasso be taken and then relies on her super-swiftness to put Superwoman out of commission before she can recover from her surprise. The Syndicate, having all been defeated, are imprisoned between Earth-1 and Earth-2 by Green Lantern in a green bubble.

The Crime Syndicate are freed by the time-traveling villain Per Degaton after he is caught in a time-storm and discovers their bubble. They try to get him, but he made sure that he and his Time Machine would vibrate at a different speed to them, meaning that they cannot touch him. They help him change history and conquer Earth-2 by stealing nuclear missiles from the Cuban Missile Crisis of Earth Prime. The Syndicate eventually betrays him and are sent to 1982 of Earth-1, as he made sure that this would happen when they touched him. They materialize on the JLA's satellite headquarters and defeat the heroes. The JSA are imprisoned in their prison, but the combined powers of Starman and Doctor Fate got them out. The Sydicate help Degaton again when the JLA tries to restore history, though are planning to betray him. When Degaton is defeated, this timeline is erased and the Syndicate is re-imprisoned.

The pre-Crisis version of Superwoman is killed, along with the rest of the Secret Society of Super-Villains, while trying to save Earth-Three from being destroyed by the Anti-Monitor's antimatter wave.

During the Convergence storyline, Superwoman is on death row after killing Bruno Mannheim. Due to the Rogue Hunter's interference, the Crime Syndicate fails to rescue Superwoman from being executed. Superwoman is later revealed to have survived and fights her Justice League 1,000,000 counterpart.

=== Early Modern Age ===
The Antimatter Superwoman. Art by Frank Quitely.

In post-Crisis continuity, as established in the 2000 graphic novel JLA: Earth 2 by Grant Morrison, Superwoman and the rest of the Crime Syndicate comes from a parallel world similar to Earth, but located in an antimatter universe (also home to the planet Qward).

Superwoman continues to make occasional appearances as a member of the Crime Syndicate, appearing in storylines in the Justice League and Superman comics. Unlike her pre-Crisis counterpart, her magic lasso does not change shape but releases the inhibitions of anyone tied to it (just as Wonder Woman's compels victims to tell the truth). She also possesses heat vision, as Superman and Ultraman do.

Taking the alias Lois Lane, Superwoman is an Amazon by birth, and has risen through the ranks to become the chief editor of the Daily Planet in what she calls "Patriarch's World". This disguise resembles Wonder Woman's secret identity of Diana Prince. At the Planet, Superwoman is shown to upset her colleagues; the antimatter-Cat Grant refers to Superwoman as "Queen Bitch", and negatively alludes to her "friendship" with the antimatter Jimmy Olsen. In later appearances, it is stated that prior to taking on Lois Lane's identity, Superwoman was born on Damnation Island, presumably the Antimatter counterpart to Themyscira (Paradise Island). It is mentioned that she had murdered all of her fellow Amazons, and upon meeting Donna Troy, she becomes ecstatic over the prospect of being able to murder another one of her kind for the first time in years. The Antimatter Universe's version of Superwoman is the first version of the character to combine Diana of Themyscira and Lois Lane.

Jimmy Olsen is the only civilian who knows of Superwoman's secret identity. A compliant sexual deviant, he does what she tells him in exchange for the favor of watching when she changes her outfit and receiving pieces of it for his "disguise kit". He is so besotted that he ignores her gibes and insults, even when she tauntingly refers to him as, "Superwoman's Snitch, Jimmy Olsen", and prints it in the Planet.

Also in the Earth 2 story, her lover Ultraman hates Superwoman's frigidity towards him. Meanwhile, she is carrying on a torrid affair with Owlman, and they sneak trysts whenever they feel Ultraman is not watching. However, from his floating fortress (the antimatter counterpart to the Fortress of Solitude), Ultraman does not hesitate to fire warning bursts of heat vision towards them whenever he catches them together.

=== 52 and Countdown ===
In 52 #52, a recreation of Earth-3 is shown as a part of the new Multiverse. In the depiction are characters that are altered versions of the original Justice Society of America, including Wonder Woman. The character is not identified in 52, but later in Countdown to Final Crisis, which identifies her as Superwoman of the "Crime Society of America", on an alternative world which is a reversed version of Earth-2. Based on comments by Grant Morrison, this alternate universe is not the pre-Crisis Earth-Three, making this a new character unrelated to previous versions. Morrison also suggests that the Earth-3 and Antimatter Superwomen both exist post-52. Like the antimatter iteration of the character, she is indeed both a Lois Lane and Wonder Woman counterpart, despite possessing Kryptonian abilities such as heat vision. In Countdown, she is recruited into Monarch's army but has her eyes gouged out by Jason Todd.

=== The New 52 ===
Superwoman, Lois Lane, The New 52 (Earth 3).

Following DC's 2011 reboot event, "The New 52", characters from Earth-3 are again revised. Beginning in 2013 comics, Superwoman, once again the alternate version of both Lois Lane and Wonder Woman, is one of the members of the Crime Syndicate to arrive from Earth-3 at the conclusion of the "Trinity War" event. During the Forever Evil storyline, Superwoman and Owlman raid Arkham Asylum where they end up capturing Nightwing. During the Crime Syndicate's broadcast, Superwoman reveals Nightwing's identity on the broadcast. While Grid looks over the biographies of the other Syndicate members, he finds that while data on the other members are there, Superwoman's were deleted, leaving her true past and identity still a total mystery. She is also pregnant, and engaging in affairs with both Owlman and Ultraman. It was finally revealed that Superwoman is in a relationship with the crazed Lex Luthor of Earth-3, who uses the power of the lightning and goes by the name Mazahs. She betrays Ultraman, revealing she and Luthor are carrying a child who is prophesied to bring an end to the world. After Mazahs is killed by the Luthor of the main universe, Superwoman is placed in captivity. Immune to Wonder Woman's lasso of truth, Wonder Woman attempts traditional interrogation of her counterpart about the entity that destroyed their world, but Superwoman does not reveal any information. Just then, she ends up announcing "The baby. It kicked".

During the Darkseid War storyline, Superwoman is freed from A.R.G.U.S. custody by the Justice League in order to help the Justice League deal with the Anti-Monitor. Superwoman gives birth to her son during a battle with the New Gods, but is killed by Grail, who takes the baby. Grail uses the baby as a host to resurrect her father Darkseid, who had been killed by the Anti-Monitor.

=== Infinite Frontier ===
Following the reboot of the multiverse after Dark Nights: Death Metal, a new Earth-3 and Superwoman are created. Unlike most incarnations, this Superwoman is an alternate version of Donna Troy. She is the second daughter of Queen Hippolyta of Themyscira, also known as Demon's Island; her older sister Diana was apparently killed by their mother for weakness. Donna was trained from birth to be merciless in combat and anticipate any strategy her enemy may use.

In 1945, a man named Steve Trevor came to Devil's Island, seeking Amazons to act as soldiers in a war that his side was losing. Donna fell in love with him but refused to leave her home, so Steve took her hostage and demanded that Hippolyta provide warriors for his cause or he would kill Donna. Much to his shock, Hippolyta simply told Donna to save herself, which she did, stabbing Steve in the stomach. Hippolyta explained that this was Donna's final lesson, words and emotion could be potent weapons which she would need to master. The Amazons had anticipated the rise of metahumans in Man's World and Donna was sent out to infiltrate and gain control over them. She plans to one day return home at the head of an army of metahumans, kill her mother and take the throne.

Donna became the ambassador to the United States of America from Themyscira and she exerts influence over the American government by sexually dominating President Oliver Queen.

When the Starro Collective invades Earth, Owlman develops a strategy to kill the queen Starro by sending Emerald Knight into its brain, as the energy from his power battery is extremely painful to it. Emerald Knight fails and the queen responds with a psychic attack on the attacking metahumans, turning their emotional vulnerabilities against them. Superwoman resists the attack and kills the queen as it begs for mercy.

== In other media ==
=== Film ===
- Superwoman appears in Justice League: Crisis on Two Earths, voiced by Gina Torres. This version is a villainous doppelgänger of Mary Marvel, is in a relationship with Owlman, and is served by the Super Family which is her universe's version of the Marvel Family.
- Superwoman appears in Justice League: Crisis on Infinite Earths, voiced by Stana Katic.

=== Video games ===
- Superwoman appears in Lego DC Super-Villains, voiced again by Gina Torres.
- Superwoman appears in DC Universe Online.
- Superwoman appears in DC Legends.
