= Crisis on Infinite Earths (disambiguation) =

Crisis on Infinite Earths is a 1980s comic book miniseries from DC Comics.

Crisis on Infinite Earths may also refer to:

- "Crisis on Infinite Earths" (Arrowverse), a 2019 five-part television crossover adaptation of the comic
- Justice League: Crisis on Infinite Earths, a 2024 three-part animated film adaptation of the comic

== See also ==
- Justice League: Crisis on Two Earths
- "Dark Crisis", later retitled "Dark Crisis on Infinite Earths", a 2022 sequel comics miniseries to the 1980s comic
