= Power Ring (character) =

Alternate-reality counterparts of Green Lanterns

- Hal Jordan (Earth-Three) as Power Ring, art by Ivan Reis.

Publication information
- Publisher: DC Comics
- First appearance: Justice League of America #29 (August 1964)
- Created by: Gardner Fox; Mike Sekowsky

In-story information
- Alter ego: Harold Jordan
- Species: Human
- Team affiliations: Crime Syndicate of America; Crime Society of America; Justice League
- Abilities: Power ring

Power Ring is the name of several supervillains and one superheroine appearing in comic books published by DC Comics. The characters are alternate-reality counterparts of Green Lanterns Hal Jordan, Kyle Rayner, John Stewart, and Jessica Cruz. Originally portrayed as residing on Earth-Three, which was subsequently destroyed during the 12-issue Crisis on Infinite Earths limited series, the Power Rings, along with the other Crime Syndicate of America members, were later reimagined as being from an Anti-Matter Universe.

The first Power Ring debuted in Justice League of America #29 (August 1964).

== Publication history ==
=== Crime Syndicate of America (1964–1986) ===
Little is known of Power Ring's history. From what little he has said on the matter, he was given his magical power ring and power battery by a monk named Volthoom. With these weapons, he equals the power of a Green Lantern.

When Power Ring, Johnny Quick and Superwoman first arrive on Earth-One, they attempt to destroy first the Justice League and later the Justice Society of America of Earth-Two. Though beaten on the native Earths, they are able to transport both teams to Earth-Three, where they defeat them. The JLA and CSA battle on Earth-Two after the JSA are imprisoned. The Syndicate is defeated and imprisoned in an inter-dimensional limbo by Green Lantern Hal Jordan.

They remain there for years until an experimental dimensional transponder used by the Secret Society of Super-Villains disrupts the stability of the Crime Syndicate's prison. Power Ring, Johnny Quick, and Superwoman use the opportunity to escape. The Syndicate assumes the Secret Society villains were heroes and battled them. In a second confrontation, the Society takes Superwoman's magic lasso, the ring of Power Ring, and Johnny Quick's helmet. These objects of power would be used by the Wizard to cast a spell.

The Crime Syndicate fight Captain Comet, believing he is part of the Secret Society. Focusing his will through his power battery, Power Ring is able to use it as a weapon, just as he had used his ring. Unknown to the villains, Power Ring's battery of power has been leaking energy, a result of its long confinement and disuse in limbo.

Victims left in its wake are stricken with nausea, severe pain and eventual loss of consciousness. Their inert forms then glow an unearthly green before mutating into horrible rampaging creatures. Captain Comet discovers the source of the transformation, and after capturing the Syndicate, uses the power battery to cure the victims and return the Crime Syndicate to their interdimensional prison. Comet destroys the battery afterwards.

Years later, the Syndicate get another taste of freedom. Travelling through time, Per Degaton stumbles upon the interdimensional prison. He offers the Crime Syndicate an escape if they would help him in 1962 to take Cuba's intercontinental ballistic missiles. After they accomplish this task, Degaton has little use for them. When the Syndicate betrays him, they are sent to 1982, as he had made sure this would happen when they touched him.

The Syndicators rematerialize on the JLA satellite by the League's teleporter. They quickly overcome the surprised heroes who are waiting for the JSA's annual meeting with the two groups. The JSA had been sent to the Crime Syndicate's interdimensional prison and are able to escape with the combined powers of Starman and Doctor Fate.

Power Ring returns with the Syndicate to assist Per Degaton's plan to rule the world. Though they had been double-crossed by Degaton, they help him until the moment comes to strike. The villains once again fight the JLA, the JSA, and even members of the All-Star Squadron from 1942. When the villains are again defeated, the failure of Degaton's plan wipes the events from existence.

==== Crisis on Infinite Earths (1985–1987) ====
The members of the Crime Syndicate are believed to be killed during the Crisis on Infinite Earths. Power Ring and the Crime Syndicate are destroyed by waves of anti-matter, unleashed by the Anti-Monitor in his attempt to control all of existence.

==== Crisis 2 ====
Years afterwards, a strange disruption in reality (featured in Animal Man by Grant Morrison) brings back Syndicators Ultraman, Power Ring, Johnny Quick, and Owlman, as well as other variations of the Justice League. Power Ring and Ultraman think they have come back from the dead, but later learn forces beyond their imaginations are responsible for their brief return. Power Ring wishes to return to the way his life used to be, and with that thought, he vanishes. The others go into the Medusa Mask of the Psycho-Pirate, and they have not been seen since.

==== Convergence ====
During the Convergence storyline, Power Ring is with the Crime Syndicate when they plan to free Superwoman from death row.

=== New Earth (1987–2011) ===
==== Crime Syndicate of Amerika ====
Eventually, the Crime Syndicate were re-imagined as being from the antimatter universe and Power Ring resembles a blonde Kyle Rayner. This Power Ring, weak-willed and cowardly, is tricked into accepting the ring from its previous owner. After invading the other universe, Power Ring is defeated by Aquaman, as the nature of the Earths gives native beings an advantage.

==== Syndicate Rules ====
On the antimatter Earth, Power Ring is Joseph Harrolds (corresponding to Hal Jordan). On this Earth, the power ring is powered by an entity called Volthoom. A second Power Ring (corresponding to Kyle Rayner), a blond man whose name was not given, was given the ring by Harrolds and joined the Syndicate; however, when the antimatter universe was reconstructed after Krona had initially wiped out that plane of existence when trying to discover the origin of the Universe, certain elements of the antimatter universe's history had been changed, and now the second Power Ring was a black man whose name was also not given (corresponding to John Stewart). He confirmed that Harrolds tricked him into assuming responsibility of the ring, which was cursed as Volthoom was also inside the ring.

==== Crime Society of America ====
In 52 Week 52, an alternate version of Earth-Three was shown as a part of the new Multiverse. In the depiction were characters that are altered versions of the Justice Society of America, including Green Lantern. The names of the characters and the team are not mentioned in the two panels in which they appear, but the altered Green Lantern is visually similar to Power Ring.

Based on comments by Grant Morrison, this alternate universe is not the Pre-Crisis Earth-Three, making this a new character unrelated to previous versions. In Countdown #31, he is confirmed as being called Power Ring, a member of the Crime Society, alongside Ultraman, Superwoman, and Owlman.

==== Justice League Omega ====
The antimatter Crime Syndicate reappeared in writer James Robinson's Justice League of America series as part of the Justice League Omega storyline. Directly mirroring Hal Jordan's resurrection in Green Lantern: Rebirth, Power Ring has once again changed his appearance and now resembles Jordan. Ultraman mentions that Power Ring's transformation into a Hal Jordan analogue (as well as the Kyle Rayner analogue's transformation into John Stewart in the Syndicate Rules storyline) had happened suddenly and with no explanation, but notes that Power Ring is now once again in his "original" form (mirroring the mainstream DC continuity, where Hal was the first modern Green Lantern).

The Crime Syndicate attacks the Hall of Justice to steal Alexander Luthor's corpse from the Justice League's mausoleum, and Power Ring enters into a confrontation with Jade. Though Power Ring initially gains the upper hand, Jade ultimately defeats him after she absorbs the energy in his ring, rendering him powerless. When the Crime Syndicate members agree to work with the JLA to stop a new villain named the Omega Man, Power Ring begs Jade to return his powers to him, but is ultimately killed when the Omega Man ambushes the group and impales him through the back.

=== The New 52 (2011–2016) ===
As part of The New 52, four different characters have used the name.

==== First Lantern ====
The Power Ring was created on Earth-3 when Volthoom was traveling from Earth-15 to various other Earths within the Multiverse to seek a way to save his home. On Earth-3 he encountered the wizard Mordru, who fused a piece of Volthoom's soul to create the power ring. Volthoom described that they had a dispute and left. It is revealed later that the ring was created out of all the cruelty and hatred within Volthoom as he claims that for thousands of years his only pleasure was to watch those who attempted to wield the ring fail and die. The ring would then seek out the fearful, lead them to death and swallow their souls. Being chosen to be a Power Ring is considered a curse. The ring remained in Earth-3 until the "Forever Evil" storyline.

==== Abin Sur (Earth-3) ====
Abin Sur was the most recent unwilling bearer of the Ring of Volthoom. He is weak-willed and cowardly as opposed to his heroic counterpart Abin Sur of Earth-One, who was strong-willed and brave. He begs Harold to take the ring by promising it will make him powerful and is shown to be joyous once Harold does, claiming himself to be finally free. However, he dies shortly after this from the injuries sustained from his crash, finally being freed only to meet his bitter end. Abin Sur has shown to have suffered adverse physical effects from the ring far worse than any other user ever displayed. His entire body is destroyed due to his bearing the ring for a long period of time.

==== Crime Syndicate ====
Power Ring is one of the members of the Crime Syndicate to arrive from Earth-3 at the conclusion of the "Trinity War" event. Power Ring is the villainous counterpart to Hal Jordan's Green Lantern and in an inverse relationship to Green Lantern, the character and syndicate member "Power Ring" is actually the Ring of Volthoom while Harold Jordan (Hal Jordan's Earth-3 counterpart) is merely his current vessel, though both are referred to as Power Ring throughout the comic. Harold worked as a janitor at Ferris Air, where he spied on Carol Ferris' operations to sell them out. When being confronted by Carl Ferris, Abin Sur's ring of Volthoom chooses Harold, bringing him to Abin's crashed ship. Abin begs Harold to take the ring, which he does, freeing Abin Sur. Harold quickly realizes his mistake, as the ring opens a pocket dimensional portal to charge itself, unleashing a creature that attacks Harold. Power Ring then goes on to form the Crime Syndicate along with Ultraman, Superwoman, Owlman, and Johnny Quick.

He is first seen at the end of "Trinity War" emerging with the rest of the Crime Syndicate from the portal from Earth-Three. He immediately attacks the Justice League upon arrival, knocking them all down with an energy blast while Harold nervously questions whether the area is safe. During the "Forever Evil" storyline, Power Ring accompanies Deathstorm in his raid on Belle Reve and destroys the roof to free its inmates. Later, again accompanying Deathstorm, Power Ring attacks the Rogues, who have refused to cause mass deaths in their own city, against the Crime Syndicate's orders. When Deathstorm leaves to head back to the Syndicate's lab, Power Ring, with Secret Society members, attack Batman, Catwoman, and Lex Luthor's Injustice Society at Wayne Enterprises. Batman attempts to stop Power Ring with a Sinestro Corps ring, but Power Ring's constructs are able to remove the ring and destroy it. Batman's use of the ring summons Sinestro. Power Ring battles Sinestro, but Sinestro cuts off his arm with the ring; after the ring deems Harold irreparably damaged, it flies off. Harold thanks Sinestro for freeing him from his curse. Sinestro welcomes his thanks and incinerates him. The ownerless ring then flies off to find a new host.

While Harold is seemingly shown to wield the Ring of Volthoom proficiently, the Ring of Volthoom is actually the one in control, though Harold does have some independent control over the ring's power. The ring of Volthoom is as powerful as a Green Lantern ring and is even able to fight on par with a Sinestro Corps ring, remove it from the user's hand and impressively destroy the Sinestro Corps ring itself. The Outsider refers to Power Ring as his master and mentions to Pandora that Power Ring has killed many immortal beings during the Crime Syndicate's time on Earth-Three After Harold's death his soul was sucked into the ring like other previous deceased power ring Corp members, the location inside the ring was known as the green realm. When Jessica Cruz's soul was pushed into the ring while Volthoom took possession of her body she encountered Harold and other the other Power Ring Corps members. Harold tells Jessica that he refuses to let her leave because Volthoom would return and that when inside the ring, Volthoom would periodically torture their souls by burning out their eyes and inflicting other horrors on them. He and the other Power Ring bearers chase Jessica through the Green Realm to stop her from reaching Cyborg but they are unsuccessful. When Volthoom dies, the Green Realm lives on due to Jessica's soul filling the void. Harold continues to live in the Green Realm, having given into fear long ago he chooses to hide in the dirt with the other power ring bearers but finally free from the torments inflicted on them by Volthoom. When Jessica returns to the Green Realm, Simon Baz encounters Harold when he follows Jessica into it to save her from becoming as evil and cruel as Volthoom. Harold tries to prevent him from finding Jessica as he fears this would destroy the green realm, when he is unsuccessful he calls up Solomon Baz (Simon Baz's Earth 3 counterpart) to stop Simon. When Simon finally finds Jessica and convinces her not to become like Volthoom, the Green Realm still remains intact, much to Harold's relief, and he returns to hiding within it.

==== Jessica Cruz ====
Jessica Cruz and her friends are on a hunting trip when they accidentally stumble across two men burying a body. The men brutally murder her friends. Jessica manages to escape but is left traumatized. The Ring of Volthoom, which feeds off fear and had abandoned Harold after his death during the Crime Syndicate's incursion to Prime Earth, is able to locate her due to her trauma. Unlike the previous ring bearers, she does not willingly accept the Ring but is forced to do so. The ring tortures Jessica with physical and psychological pain. Batman is able to de-power the Ring after convincing Jessica to face her fears. Hal Jordan returns to Earth to teach Jessica how to control the ring, but in a later adventure, the ring finds a chance to possess Jessica's mind and body. Jessica becomes trapped within the ring along with Cyborg while Power Ring is in full possession of her body. With Cyborg's help, Jessica is able to momentarily take control and saves the Flash from the Black Racer by allowing the incarnation of death to apparently kill her. Jessica survives, and it is revealed that the Black Racer killed Volthoom instead, causing the ring to crumble into dust. Immediately afterwards, a Green Lantern ring descends at the battlefield and transforms Jessica into a new Green Lantern.

==== Solomon Baz ====
Solomon Baz, art by V.Ken Marion (penciler).

Solomon Baz was the Earth-3 doppelgänger of Simon Baz. He was once a getaway driver with a fearsome reputation until he took a job delivering a bomb to a concert. Arriving at the venue, Solomon relented, unable to bring himself to blow up the young concertgoers. Questioning his identity and overcome with insecurity, Solomon was soon selected to become the new host and victim of the Ring of Volthoom. When his life was inevitably consumed by the ring, Solomon joined the other deceased ring bearers of the Power Ring Corps in the Green Realm. There he remained, buried in the dirt, until called upon to face his Earth-0 counterpart.

=== Rebirth ===
During the "Year of the Villain" event, Earth 3 alongside the Crime Syndicate of America was revived. Power Ring returns and uses his ring to see how many alternate Earth's are left after Perpetua's assault. He states that Earth-3 is safe because Perpetua is only destroying "good guy" Earths. Lex Luthor of Earth 0 comes to escort them to Perpetua. After witnessing Johnny Quick get killed when he suspects that allying with her is a bad idea, he returns to Earth 3 to lead the people in her army where the people of Earth 3 were turned into Apex Predators.

=== Infinite Frontier (Emerald Knight) ===
Following the reboot of the multiverse after Dark Nights: Death Metal, a new Earth 3 and Crime Syndicate are created. The counterpart to Green Lantern on the new Earth 3 is known as Emerald Knight. Whereas the various versions of Power Ring are usually shown to be lone operators with a unique ring and battery, the Emerald Knights are an interplanetary private police force with multiple members, a counterpart to the Green Lantern Corps. Their uniforms resemble that worn by the Hal Jordan of the mainstream DC Universe as Parallax. The Knights serve the Overlords of Oa, the sworn enemies of the Starros.

Police officer John Stewart accepted a loan from a loan shark to pay for surgery for his daughter Liza. Although he eventually paid off the debt the man's son acted as if he controlled John, to the point of blatantly committing crimes in front of him. John beat the loan shark's son in an alley when a sentient power ring appeared before him and invited him into the Emerald Knights. John was initially reluctant but accepted the power that the ring offered to protect himself and Liza from the loan shark. He used its power to become a vigilante in Coast City, enforcing his own view of "justice" by murdering both criminals and the corrupt officials of the city. He and the ring constantly argue. The ring berates him for not taking swifter action and is slowly taking over his will by convincing him that the ring can stop evil and enforce justice.

He is the second Emerald Knight of Earth, the first was killed by Owlman. The Earth 3 counterpart of Hal Jordan appears to also be a member of the Emerald Knights.

As Starros are repelled by the energy from Emerald Knight's power battery, Owlman's strategy for defeating the Starros was for Emerald Knight to enter the "queen" Starro's brain and destroy it from within. He failed, and the queen was instead killed by Superwoman.

Following the invasion, Emerald Knight declares Coast City beyond the jurisdiction of all Earth's authorities and seals it off from the world in a gigantic forcefield. While the ring constantly goads him to do more to "protect" the world by aligning with Ultraman, Owlman and Superwoman to take over the world. A former Knight named Thaal Sinestro, who managed to free himself from his ring's control, approaches him and tells him that the ring has corrupted him and that the people he wishes to protect now fear him. John tries to visit Liza, but when she is terrified of him and tells him to leave, he realises Sinestro is right and joins Lex Luthor's Legion of Justice much to his Ring's disapproval and annoyance.

== Powers and abilities ==
All Power Rings wield a magical ring that can generate a variety of effects and energy constructs which give them powers equivalent to those of a Green Lantern. In its first appearance, it is not unlike a lantern ring sustained purely by the ring wearer's strength of will. The power ring has been referred to on several occasions as the "most dangerous weapon in the universe" and the limits of its power are not clearly defined. With sufficient willpower, a Power Ring could conceivably wield nearly omnipotent power. All stories after 1964 no longer have the ring draw its strength from willpower. After Crisis 2, the various incarnations of Power Ring refer to wielding the ring as a "curse"; Volthoom, the entity within the ring, would frequently try to overtake the user's mind and the power ring is physically and mentally painful to wield. The New 52 series has the Ring of Volthoom rely on fear to function; unlike the Sinestro Corps ring, which relies on the fear of others, the Ring of Volthoom is sustained by the user's fear. In the multiverse reboot the Ring of Volthoom seemingly runs on its own and only requires the user to charge it. The ring will only respond to the user's will but will act on its own if the user is in danger.

Power rings allow the user to fly and to cover themselves and others with a protective force field, suitable for traveling through outer space. They can also generate beams and solid structures of energy that can be moved simply by thinking about doing so, enabling the user to create cages, transportation platforms, walls, and battering rams. The ring can also be used to search for energy signatures or particular objects. It can serve as a universal translator. The ring can place people in a hypnotic trance, show other Earths and enable people to travel between them, even drawing them if the user is on another Earth; in 'Darkseid War', Grail, the daughter of Darkseid, states that the ring is a tether to Earth-Three and assaults its host to open a portal to Earth-Three, which allows the Anti-Monitor to cross over onto Earth-Zero. The ring can manipulate sub-atomic particles (effectively producing new elements) and split atoms, but those powers are rarely used by Power Ring. It is not known if any of the various Power Ring's ring incarnations have had a specific weakness, but in the original 1960's JLA/JSA/CSA encounter, both wooden and yellow weapons were ineffective against Power Ring. His amused response to these tactics indicated that he had not as yet encountered any ring-specific weaknesses or he would likely have been more cautious. Harold Jordan was shown using the Ring of Volthoom to connect directly to the JLA watchtower computer to talk to Grid. Further in The New 52, Harold Jordan was able to destroy a Sinestro Corps ring, crushing it in his hand. He also was able to destroy the constructs with his own and remove the ring from Batman, though the Sinestro Corps ring was very low on power, which may have contributed to Power Ring being able to destroy it (the Ring of Volthoom was also low on charge, albeit not as low as the Sinestro Corps ring). This mistake by Batman would later be made by Power Ring, as he had engaged Sinestro while his own ring was low on charge.

The ring appears to have a part of soul of a fully sentient entity named Volthoom, able to talk to and advise the user as to various courses of action (though it is stated that Volthoom can be unreliable); most portrayals show Volthoom to have a personality and a mind of its own unlike the highly advanced programs which reside in the Green Lantern rings. In the 1964 comic book, Volthoom is purportedly the mad monk that offered the ring to the first Power Ring, at which point he kills Volthoom and takes the ring. Justice League of America #50 seems to imply that Volthoom is the antimatter equivalent of the Starheart, which bestowed its power on Alan Scott and Jade on New Earth. Volthoom's character has evolved along with Power Ring. Pre-Crisis, Volthoom simply was the entity of the ring and would act no different than a standard Green Lantern ring (albeit magical in nature as opposed to scientific), only responding to the bearer's will. Later, Volthoom was retconned as the cursed spirit of the ring which attempted to overtake the mind of Harold Jordan and later other bearers of the ring. Volthoom would seek out cowardly, weak-willed individuals to manipulate and control because they would rely on the power of the ring and slowly allow Volthoom to possess them. In The New 52, Volthoom is far less subtle and directly feeds off the fear of the ring bearer and forces them to do his bidding. Volthoom causes the host tremendous pain to the point where Harold Jordan was actually relieved when Sinestro sliced off his arm and the ring left. The ring is able to fully possess a host if need be. The New 52 states that the entity within the ring contains a small portion of the soul of the First Lantern from "Wrath of the First Lantern". In the multiverse reboot, Volthoom is now the sentient power ring granted to the Emerald Knights by the Overlords of Oa, the Earth-3 equivalent of the Green Lantern corps. Volthoom seems to act as more of a guide to the Emerald Knights directing them on how to use his power. While the ring causes the knights no pain nor does it attempt to forcefully control them, it does appear that the ring attempts convince them to trust its power more and more until they fully subjugate themselves to the Overlords of Oa. Volthoom is also susceptible to being hacked as Owlman was able to hack the ring to obtain intel on the Starros.

In addition, the effectiveness of a wielder's power ring can be adversely affected by a weakening of resolve and will or later fear. Prior to post-Infinite Crisis, most if not all Power Rings did not have automatic shields provided by their rings and were forced to create constructs to defend themselves (this was a major difference between Power Ring and Green Lantern). In later stories like The New 52, the ring would typically reserves a small portion of their power for a passive force field that "protects the wielder from mortal harm". In dire emergency, that energy reserve can be tapped at the expense of said protection until it, too, is exhausted. Power Ring, in his original appearance, had a magical lamp which would act as a power battery for his ring. In The New 52, Power Ring's battery is located in a pocket dimension and has tentacles and a mouth with sharp teeth, Geoff Jones describes charging the ring as an horrific experience to the wielder. In the multiverse reboot the Emerald Knights seem to have a power battery that is similar to the green lantern power battery. Owlman was able to use a power battery that he took from an Emerald Knight to hack into the ring.

In the Forever Evil storyline in The New 52, Power Ring was shown with the ring of Volthoom; it was causing detrimental effects on his body. These effects were displayed through grotesque, greenish veins being visible on Power Ring's right hand and arm, extending to his neck. The same deformation was visible (to a much greater degree, resultant of a longer "bonding" period) on Power Ring's predecessor, Abin Sur. The deformation started to take effect on Jessica Cruz after the ring was placed on her hand. These veins are the ring mainlining with the wielder's basolateral nucleus in their amygdala to channel their fear. The ring is rendered powerless if its user is not afraid, Batman shut down the ring after he convinced Jessica not to be fearful; also, if the user is knocked unconscious, the ring will stop working until the user retains consciousness (as shown when Jessica Cruz was knocked out). Captain Cold was also able to "quiet" the ring for a few moments with a blast from his cold gun. The Flash also states that the Ring of Volthoom is unable to do anything that the user will not allow it to; to this end, Jessica Cruz was able to make Volthoom go into dormancy by enforcing her will over his. Cyborg explains that the ring is drawn to the weak willed and fearful, leading its host to their death and then sucks in their soul. The ring has a green pocket dimension located within it which houses its central battery and other members of the Power Ring Corps.

The Outsider also mentions to Pandora that Harold Jordan, along with the rest of the Crime Syndicate, know how to kill immortal beings such as herself and have done so many times. Being magical in nature, Power Ring's ring is more effective than a normal Green Lantern ring against Kryptonians like Superman. As shown in Power Ring's first appearance, he was able to defeat Superman by transporting him to Earth-Three while pointing out that Superman is vulnerable to his ring's magic.

== In other media ==
=== Film ===
- A version of Power Ring corresponding to Hal Jordan appears in Justice League: Crisis on Two Earths, voiced by an uncredited Nolan North.
- A version of Power Ring corresponding to John Stewart appears in Justice League: Crisis on Infinite Earths – Part One, voiced by Aldis Hodge.

=== Video games ===
A version of Power Ring corresponding to Hal Jordan appears in Lego DC Super-Villains, voiced by Dee Bradley Baker.

=== Miscellaneous ===
Power Ring appears in the novel The Flash: Green Arrow's Perfect Shot, written by Barry Lyga.
