= JLA: Earth 2 =

2000 graphic novel by Grant Morrison

- Cover art of JLA: Earth 2, art by Frank Quitely.

Publication information
- Publisher: DC Comics
- Format: Graphic novel
- Genre: Superhero
- Publication date: September 2000
- Main character(s): Justice League; Crime Syndicate of America

Creative team
- Written by: Grant Morrison
- Artist: Frank Quitely

JLA: Earth 2 is a graphic novel written by Grant Morrison with art by Frank Quitely, published in 2000 by American company DC Comics.

It follows the first post-Crisis encounter between the Justice League of America and their evil counterparts from an antimatter universe, the Crime Syndicate of America.

== Title ==
The Crime Syndicate traditionally originated from Earth-3 in the DC Comic multiverse, but as that multiverse was eliminated in Crisis on Infinite Earths, so was the pre-crisis Earth-3.

At the time JLA: Earth 2 was published, generally only two universes existed: a primary universe made of ordinary matter where the mainstream stories took place, and an antimatter universe where the Crime Syndicate originated. Alexander Luthor in this story was from the antimatter universe, and he designated the primary universe as Earth 2 upon discovering it, hence the book title.

DC Comics later revived the concept of the multiverse in Infinite Crisis and 52 and further revised it with the onset of The New 52 and DC Rebirth. As a result, the Earth 2 concept introduced in this book no longer exists, and the term Earth 2 has a different meaning in the current continuity.

== Plot summary ==
Alexander Luthor, the lone hero from the antimatter universe, breaks the barrier between Earths 1 and 2, seeking the JLA's help. He imprisons and takes the place of his evil positive matter counterpart, Lex Luthor. Meanwhile, the JLA investigates a plane crash where all the dead passengers have hearts on the right side of their bodies and money bearing the slogan "In Mammon We Trust" along with the face of Benedict Arnold. This leads them to Alexander Luthor, who informs them of the other Earth and asks for 48 hours of their time to help the oppressed world. The JLA, except for Aquaman and the Martian Manhunter, follow Luthor to the alternate Earth.

The Crime Syndicate is introduced, each member an evil counterpart of a JLA member. Ultraman calls a meeting, discovers Luthor's absence, and begins plotting to take over the positive matter universe, while Power Ring and Johnny Quick discuss the possibility of having counterparts to themselves.

Green Lantern forms a force field around the moon, trapping the CSA in their lunar base. The JLA and Luthor begin to set the world right. Batman works to clear Gotham City of crime with the antimatter-universe version of his father, police Chief Thomas Wayne, who survived the famous shooting that spawned Batman while Bruce and his mother were killed. In this universe, Bruce had a brother, Thomas Jr, who blamed his father for the deaths and became Owlman out of revenge. The ruthless crime lord Boss Gordon is also brought to justice.

Owlman correctly concludes that 24 hours after the JLA appeared on the antimatter Earth, the CSA will be transported to the positive-matter Earth in order to correct a dimensional equilibrium. When this occurs, the CSA attack the White House and destroy much of Washington DC, then are easily subdued by Aquaman and the Martian Manhunter, who take down the most powerful CSA members with startling ease.

Meanwhile, the JLA's attempts to reform the antimatter Earth unravel quickly; the "opposite" nature of this world means that evil and corruption are the natural order of things and any attempt to improve the society is doomed to failure. This is also why the CSA fell so easily to Aquaman and Martian Manhunter; justice is destined to prevail on the positive-matter Earth.

It is revealed that Luthor has been manipulated by Ultraman's servant, the antimatter Brainiac. Luthor's actions in bringing the two Earths into contact will unintentionally result in the two Earths merging into the same space and destroying each other, with the JLA and CSA being powerless to stop it due to their being on Earths where they, by the nature of the respective universes, cannot win. Brainiac anticipated this and has prepared himself to collect the energy released by the destroyed Earths, evolving into an "Nth Level Intelligence" and essentially becoming a god.

Attempting to stop the collision, Superman discovers that this Brainiac is a biological organism; Superman's code against killing prevents him from harming Brainiac. Convinced now that only evil could win on the antimatter Earth, Superman and Wonder Woman refrain from trying to defeat Brainiac themselves. Flash switches the teams back to their respective Earths. Upon arrival, a vengeful Ultraman gives Brainiac a laser-vision lobotomy to ensure that he never poses a threat again. The two Earths return to their own spaces, and each team ponders their counterparts on the other side of the dimensional barrier. Owlman and Superwoman, who have been having an affair behind Ultraman’s back, secretly meet and become intimate. Ultraman fires his heat vision at the couple as a warning and Owlman playfully tells Ultraman he missed. A smirking Ultraman tells Brainiac that “all’s well.”

== Characters ==
- JLA:
  - Superman
  - Batman
  - Wonder Woman
  - Green Lantern
  - Flash
  - Aquaman
  - Martian Manhunter
- CSA:
  - Ultraman
  - Owlman
  - Superwoman
  - Power Ring
  - Johnny Quick
  - White Martian (Does not appear but is mentioned as having killed by Ultraman before the beginning of the story.)

== In other media ==
=== Television ===
- The Justice League two-parter episode "A Better World" featured an alternative world ruled by a villainous Justice League counterparts called the Justice Lords. In the episode, the Justice League are carried to another earth in which the Lords lobotomize the villains and lock them in Arkham Asylum. They fought against the Justice League, but at the final, they were defeated by the League with the special help of Batman and Lex Luthor. According to the production team, they originally wanted to make an adaptation of JLA: Earth 2 featuring the Crime Syndicate of America, but the idea was finally scrapped in favor of the Justice Lords.

=== Film ===
- Circa 2004, the production team of Justice League developed a direct-to-video feature film entitled Justice League: Worlds Collide, which was planned to be an adaptation of JLA: Earth 2 and also would have shown the Crime Syndicate of America as the main antagonists. The project was finally cancelled because the production team could not work concurrently in the film and in the first season of Justice League Unlimited, as Bruce Timm planned.
- The 2010 film Justice League: Crisis on Two Earths is an animated adaptation of JLA: Earth 2, although it is also based on the cancelled Worlds Collide project, because the script of this project ended up being used for this film, but all references to the DC Animated Universe were removed.

== See also ==
- "Forever Evil", a similar storyline in The New 52
