= Crime Syndicate of America =

DC Comics supervillain team

- The original Crime Syndicate of America, as they appeared on a splash page of Convergence: Crime Syndicate #1 (April 2015). Art by Phil Winslade (pencils and inks) and Lovern Kindzierski (colors).

Publication information
- Publisher: DC Comics
- First appearance: Justice League of America #29 (August 1964)
- Created by: Gardner Fox; Mike Sekowsky

In-story information
- Base(s): The Panopticon; The Flying Fortress
- Member(s): Ultraman; Owlman; Superwoman; Johnny Quick; Power Ring

The Crime Syndicate or Crime Syndicate of America (CSA, with America sometimes spelled Amerika) is a team of supervillains featured in DC Comics. The team is composed of evil parallel-universe counterparts of the Justice League, first appearing in Justice League of America #29 in August 1964 with members Ultraman, Owlman, Superwoman, Johnny Quick, and Power Ring, counterparts to Superman, Batman, Wonder Woman, the Flash, and Green Lantern respectively.

The Crime Syndicate has undergone several revisions in its publication history. Its members were originally portrayed as being from Earth-3, then an antimatter Earth in the JLA: Earth 2 graphic novel. Following The New 52 reboot, the team reverted back to an Earth-3 origin, where they appear in Justice League Volume 2 as the main focus of the crossover storyline Forever Evil. An analogous team, the Crime Society, a villainous version of the Justice Society, appeared in 52, later featuring in Countdown to Final Crisis.

== Publication history ==
=== Pre-Crisis ===
As detailed in Justice League of America #29 (August 1964), the Crime Syndicate of America originally lived on Earth-Three, a world where history was "reversed" from the real world (e.g., Christopher Columbus discovered Europe, British colonists declared their independence from America, and President John Wilkes Booth was assassinated by actor Abraham Lincoln). It initially had no superheroes, only the supervillains of the Crime Syndicate, though this changed with the later introduction of the heroic Lex Luthor who used his vast intelligence for good.

Justice League of America #29 (August 1964).

In their first appearance, the Crime Syndicate, bored with the ease with which they are able to commit crimes on their Earth with no one to challenge them, discover the existence of Earth-One and Earth-Two after Ultraman is exposed to kryptonite and gains the ability to see into other universes. Intrigued by the existence of superheroes, they cross the dimensional void and attack the Justice League (JLA) and JSA. The villains are at first defeated but when they said the word "Volthoom", they sent themselves into Earth-Three thanks to a fail-safe created by Power Ring. The CSA capture the JSA by transporting them to Earth-Three and imprisoning them, intending to fight the JLA on Earth-2 to prove their superiority. However, the JLA defeat the CSA by tricking the members into unleashing more power than they could control. Following this, the JLA imprison the CSA in Limbo, where time has no meaning.

Earth-Three and the original Crime Syndicate are among the universes destroyed by an antimatter wave during the Crisis on Infinite Earths event. The original Earth-Three Syndicate make several post-Crisis appearances, when Ultraman and Power Ring appeared in the Animal Man series, and then again in Infinite Crisis, when Earth-Three is temporarily recreated. The Crime Syndicate also appears in the Convergence storyline, where Earth-Three is among the universes and time periods captured by Brainiac.

=== Early Modern Age ===
A post-Crisis version of the team, simply known as the "Crime Syndicate" (not 'of America'), was eventually introduced. This version is composed of Qwardians, residents of the antimatter counterpart of Oa. They act as the second Conglomerate team of Claire Montgomery, Maxwell Lord's ex-wife.

=== Post-Zero Hour ===
The antimatter Crime Syndicate of Amerika (and their good counterparts) featured on the cover of the JLA: Earth 2 graphic novel; art by Frank Quitely.

Following a further "soft" reboot of DC continuity in Zero Hour: Crisis in Time! (1994), the Crime Syndicate was introduced once again, in 2000, in the JLA: Earth 2 graphic novel by Grant Morrison, which combined the Pre-Crisis parallel Earth idea with the pre-Zero Hour antimatter universe concept. The Crime Syndicate's Post-Zero Hour antimatter Earth possesses a "reversed" history similar to Earth-Three's, but with a much darker tone to the team and its world. JLA Secret Files and Origins 2004 provided additional history of this team, showing that even though they did partially resemble the Earth-Three Syndicate, they were still easily identifiable from their Pre-Crisis Earth-Three incarnation. Unlike the Crime Syndicate of Earth-Three, this Crime Syndicate of Amerika are able to rule their world, though they allow governments to continue operating and honest people are able to continue operating in pockets such as Gotham City Police Commissioner Thomas Wayne (father to Owlman and counterpart of the murdered father of Batman).

Due to the events of the crossover JLA/Avengers, the antimatter universe is rebooted, replacing Power Ring with a counterpart of John Stewart. The Crime Syndicate journey to the matter universe to attack Earth, blaming the JLA for the changes. Meanwhile, the Qwardians rally behind a dimension-destroying weapon called the Void Hound and pursue the Syndicate to the matter universe, laying waste to hundreds of planets along the way. Reluctantly, the CSA team up with the JLA, but the Void Hound proves too powerful. The heroes defeat the Void Hound by using a former JLA foe, the Construct, to remove the artificial intelligence of the weapon and render it powerless. With the Void Hound defeated and the CSA owing the JLA a favor for saving them, the villains are sent back to the antimatter universe, where they discover to their horror that the Qwardians have also invaded their Earth.

After the events of Infinite Crisis, the pre-Crisis Ultraman appears in the bottled city of Kandor posing as Kal-El (Superman). It is also revealed that Saturn Queen, last seen in "Absolute Power", survived the reboot of the universe in Infinite Crisis and used her telepathy to convince Ultraman that he is Kal-El and that she is his mother. Saturn Queen further manipulates events to place him in charge of Kandor and controls Kara Zor-El (Supergirl) into marrying him. Kara eventually breaks free and in a blind rage beats him to a pulp. Ultraman is saved when Saturn Queen provides information to Supergirl about her lost home of Argo City in exchange for sparing his life.

Meanwhile, the antimatter CSA made their next appearance in Trinity. Here, it is revealed that the Syndicate have gained control of their Earth again and have been abducting people from throughout the multiverse to use as slave labor to repair their damaged Earth. After the hyper-powered Trinity heroes of the story defeat and imprison the Syndicate and free the slaves, the antimatter Earth falls into chaos.

In Justice League of America (vol. 2) #43, Doctor Impossible and his cohorts use Blue Jay to open up a gateway to the Multiverse. Owlman, Ultraman, and Superwoman are briefly seen standing atop a building, with shadows obscuring most of their identifying marks, thus making it unclear which versions they are. The full Crime Syndicate members later appear with the original pre-Crisis iterations of Power Ring and Johnny Quick replacing their contemporary counterparts as a mirror to the events of Green Lantern: Rebirth and Flash: Rebirth. After arriving on New Earth following the destruction of their world at the hands of Alexander Luthor Jr., the Syndicate attacks the Hall of Justice, where Luthor's corpse was interred after the Joker killed him in Infinite Crisis. It is revealed that the Syndicate members were working with Impossible to create a machine that could resurrect the dead, hoping that they could revive Luthor and force him to undo the damage he had dealt to the Crime Syndicate's world. Just as the machine is to be activated, Impossible double-crosses the Syndicate and attempts to resurrect Darkseid rather than Luthor, but the machine malfunctions and creates a powerful villain called the Omega Man.

In the ensuing storyline, Power Ring is killed and the members of the Justice League and the Crime Syndicate are forced to work together to stop the Omega Man. Realizing that the situation is hopeless, Owlman betrays the League and turns them over to the Omega Man, figuring that the Syndicate could take over the League's Earth after the Omega Man kills off most of the heroes. At the last second, Batman reveals that he anticipated the Syndicate's betrayal, and has the Tangent Universe Green Lantern temporarily resurrect Luthor. Luthor builds a machine that returns the Syndicate to their world and seemingly destroys Omega Man.

=== 52 ===
The Crime Society from 52 #52; art by Justiniano.

In 52 #52, an alternate version of Earth-Three is shown as a part of the new Multiverse. In the depiction are characters that are altered versions of the original Justice League of America, plus the Martian Manhunter. The names of the characters and the team are not mentioned in the two panels in which they appear.

Based on comments by Grant Morrison, this alternate universe is not the pre-Crisis Earth-Three, making these new characters unrelated to previous versions. In Countdown #31, the name of this team is revealed to be the Crime Society. The Society are said to be evil doppelgangers of the heroes of Earth-2, and make their first solo appearance in Countdown Presents The Search for Ray Palmer - Crime Society #1 written by Sean McKeever and illustrated by Jamal Igle. In addition to the five known members, this version of the CSA includes evil versions of Green Arrow, Wildcat, Black Canary, Hawkwoman, Stargirl, and Spectre. Later issues introduce Annataz Arataz (the counterpart of Zatanna), and counterparts of Supergirl (Kara Zor-El), Wonder Girl (Donna Troy), and Booster Gold.

Shortly after the Crime Society's introduction, they are offered a place among Monarch's army. Already recruited into the Monarch's army, Johnny Quick wins a place in Monarch's elite squad when he defeats his Earth-9 and Earth-2 counterparts in the Countdown: Arena miniseries. All of the Crime Society members who are present in the Earth-51 dimension at the end battle with Superman-Prime and the Monarch are killed, as the entire dimension is destroyed with only Superman-Prime surviving.

=== The New 52 ===
The New 52 iteration of the Crime Syndicate, as they appeared on the cover of Justice League (vol. 2) #24 (December 2013, DC Comics), art by Ivan Reis.

In "The New 52", with the changes of this new timeline, Crime Syndicate was introduced as the true antagonists of the "Villains Month" event, and the Forever Evil series.

At the conclusion of Trinity War, it is revealed that the leader of the Secret Society of Super Villains, previously known as Outsider, is the Earth-Three counterpart of Alfred Pennyworth. He gains possession of Pandora's Box to open a portal to Earth-3, from which the Crime Syndicate emerges. The Crime Syndicate then proceeds to attack the fallen Justice League members and claims Prime Earth now belongs to them.

The New 52 line-up of the Crime Syndicate consists of Ultraman, Superwoman, Owlman, Johnny Quick, Power Ring, Deathstorm, Sea King, and two new members: Atomica, who had posed as the Atom while working as a mole for the Secret Society, and Grid, a sentient computer virus in a robot body made from Cyborg's old prosthetic parts. After Power Ring falls in battle against Sinestro, Grid informs Ultraman and Superwoman about it at the time when they are looking for Batman's kryptonite ring. Grid also informs them that the ring has released a pulse that was sensed throughout the multiverse. Knowing the creature that destroyed their world has found them, Ultraman orders the Syndicate to regroup and heads to Maine with them. Batman, Lex Luthor and their team arrive at the fallen Watchtower and go in search of the kidnapped Nightwing and the Crime Syndicate. Grid informs Outsider of the intrusion and he goes to protect their hooded prisoner over Nightwing, only for Black Manta to intercept Outsider and kill him. Batman, Luthor, Catwoman, and Bizarro enter the room with Nightwing and see he has been placed in a detonator for a bomb that can only be stopped if Nightwing's heart stops. The remaining Crime Syndicate members return to the Watchtower and attack Sinestro, Deathstroke, and Black Adam. Johnny Quick and Atomica attack Captain Cold and Black Manta, who have unmasked the prisoner and removed the tape from his mouth. Cold fires his cold gun on Quick's leg and then breaks it off. Back with Nightwing, Luthor prevents Batman from saving Nightwing, choosing to save the group's lives over Nightwing's. As Nightwing dies, Batman attacks Luthor for murdering him, with Luthor trying to reason with him that he has everything under control. With the hooded prisoner now free, he reveals himself as Alexander Luthor. Luthor transforms into Mazahs and kills the injured Quick, taking his power. After the trapped superheroes are freed from the Firestorm matrix, Superwoman reveals that the father of her child is Alexander Luthor. Mazahs destroys Deathstorm, only to be killed by Luthor. As he does, Black Adam and Sinestro move the Moon, causing Ultraman to be hit with the sun, weakening him. Atomica reappears from underneath the rubble, only to be killed by Luthor. Luthor rejoins the heroes and saves Superman by removing the kryptonite from his brain. In the aftermath, Ultraman and Superwoman are captured, with Owlman still on the loose.

In the "Darkseid War" story in Justice League, Cyborg and Jessica Cruz, who has partially learned to harness Power Ring's Ring of Volthoom, seek out Superwoman in prison for guidance on how to deal with the Anti-Monitor, who has killed Darkseid and now threatens all of existence. Seizing the opportunity to reunite the Syndicate, Volthoom seizes control of Jessica's body. When Cyborg attempts to interface with the ring, Grid is resurrected and gains control of his armor. As the trio plot to reunite with Ultraman, Owlman appears and declares that the League and Syndicate must work together to stop the Anti-Monitor. Ultraman is incinerated by the Anti-Monitor, ignoring Superman's warnings that it is too powerful to fight alone. Superwoman gives birth to her baby and is shortly thereafter killed by the Anti-Monitor. Having abandoned his comrades, Owlman indicates he never cared for the Syndicate, and his ultimate goal was to use Metron's Mobius Chair to gain all knowledge in the multiverse. He strikes a bargain with Metron and sits in the chair, absorbing its secrets. Suddenly, Owlman becomes aware of a presence but before he can react, he and Metron are seemingly vaporized by a blue light.

=== DC Rebirth ===
In 2016, DC Comics implemented a relaunch of its books called "DC Rebirth", which restored its continuity to a form much as it was prior to "The New 52". During the "Year of the Villain" event, the Crime Syndicate is revealed to still be alive and their universe has been restored following the events of "Doomsday Clock". They ally with Perpetua in her conquest of the multiverse, secretly planning to take power for themselves. However, Owlman learns from John Stewart that there have been other versions of himself and thus he can never truly be erased as a version of Owlman will always exist. Upon this realization, Owlman betrays them and destroys his own world out of jealousy towards The Batman Who Laughs, and his belief that he will inevitably be reincarnated when the multiverse reforms.

=== Infinite Frontier ===
Following the reboot of the multiverse at the end of Dark Nights: Death Metal, a new Earth 3 is created with a new Crime Syndicate. The Syndicate is brought together to fight off an invasion by the Starros, paralleling the original origin of the Justice League. The Starros claimed they were not invading but were seeking refuge from the Overlords of Oa, but were nevertheless killed by the Syndicate. Lex Luthor starts to put together a resistance against them called the Legion of Justice. However, Johnny Quick is killed before he can be recruited into the Crime Syndicate. During the fight, Emerald Knight and Ultragirl are killed and Luthor is taken prisoner. One week after the battle, the remaining members of the Legion of Justice ally with Jester and the Crime Syndicate, setting up their base in the Legion of Justice's former satellite base.

== Members ==
=== Founding members ===
The following five members founded the original Crime Syndicate of America and have appeared in all additional iterations of the team:

Ultraman
The counterpart of Superman. Pre-Crisis, the Earth-Three Ultraman came from a Krypton that had not exploded. This Ultraman also depended on kryptonite to maintain his superpowers rather than drain them (originally receiving a new power through each exposure to kryptonite). Post-Crisis, the antimatter Earth's Ultraman was a human astronaut (Lieutenant Clark Kent) given anti-Kryptonite-based superpowers after an encounter with aliens. If he is separated from anti-kryptonite long enough, his powers fade away; originally the antimatter Kent combats this power loss by inserting anti-kryptonite capsules under his skin which are released gradually over time, as shown in the JLA: Earth 2 hardcover. Later books state that his increasing resistance level has made this process impractical and he wears the anti-kryptonite in the silver-colored containers along his costume. The antimatter Clark Kent has an unhealthy obsession with his universe's Lois Lane, who is his Crime Syndicate teammate Superwoman, having forced her to marry him and bear him a son, who was later possessed by their version of Brainiac.

Owlman
The counterpart of Batman. Pre-Crisis, Owlman possessed limited mind control powers. Post-Crisis, Owlman's origin was fleshed out, with his powers enhanced by a range of technological and physical skills much like Batman's. Post-Crisis, the antimatter Owlman is Thomas Wayne Jr., the older brother of his Earth's Bruce Wayne, who was killed along with his mother. Wayne Jr. blames his father Police Commissioner Thomas Wayne Sr., which has since started a personal conflict between them to the point that Thomas Sr. is determined to kill his own son. Wayne Jr. also increased his IQ with a drug-enhancer for his cerebral cortex. Wayne Jr. openly possesses plans to counter his teammates' powers. Wayne Jr. uses these counterattacks whenever he chooses, as he causes Johnny Quick to have a minor heart attack at the beginning of the "Syndicate Rules" storyline. Wayne Jr. has had a number of illicit liaisons with Superwoman, though it is not clear whether this is a genuine attraction or just another way of showing her independence from the obsessively jealous and ever-watchful Ultraman.

Superwoman
The counterpart of Wonder Woman. Pre-Crisis, Superwoman gained her powers from being like her world's Amazons, and thus has similar powers to Wonder Woman, the gray streak in her hair shows she is aging and thus abandoned Paradise Island earlier, and her black uniform sans bracelets explains why she seems unhinged, as in pre-Crisis Amazon lore - an Amazon without bracelets is a berserker and stronger than an average Amazon. Post-Crisis, she is the antimatter Earth's version of Wonder Woman as well and has either directly or indirectly killed all the Amazons native to her reality. Superwoman took the name of Lois Lane when she established herself in Patriarch's World. Her birth name has not been revealed. Superwoman's lasso does not compel others to tell the truth, but instead releases inhibitions and forces a victim to reveal secrets which they find especially humiliating. The post-Crisis Superwoman also has heat vision and has an affair with Owlman, to the anger of her husband Ultraman.

Johnny Quick
The counterpart of the Flash. Pre-Crisis, Quick was the counterpart of the Barry Allen Flash, though he was not as fast as Allen. He wore an enhancement helmet that augmented his speed, but could not break the lightspeed or dimensional barriers on his own, even with the helmet's augmentation. Quick's name was never revealed in-panel. Each post-Crisis version of Quick derives his powers from Speed Juice, a stimulant made from the blood of his murdered predecessor. The post-Crisis Quick's predecessor was later resurrected, and was revealed to be the antimatter counterpart of Johnny Quick.

Power Ring
The counterpart of Green Lantern. Pre-Crisis, Power Ring gained his magical ring of power from a Tibetan monk named Volthoom, and has powers similar to the Silver Age Green Lantern. Post-Crisis, Power Ring was named Harrolds. The JLA: Earth 2 hardcover established that Power Ring gave the ring to a young blond man, the counterpart to Kyle Rayner. His ring was inhabited by the spirit of Volthoom, who often spoke on his own, making inane observations and taking up residence in the ring wielder's mind; all of which is considered a curse to the ring's wielder. Power Ring's favorite tactic in battle is to create monsters capable of destroying whole city blocks. The "Syndicate Rules" storyline showed that after the antimatter Universe was destroyed by Krona and recreated, certain elements of history had been changed, and now the second Power Ring was a counterpart to John Stewart. This Power Ring was a Slave Marine for many years and was tricked by Harrolds into taking the ring by telling him he was the chosen substitute to wield the ring when Harrolds could not.

=== Qwardian line-up ===
A team of Qwardians based on Justice League International appeared on the Post-Crisis/Pre-Zero Hour Earth, although they did not call themselves the Crime Syndicate, even through their predecessors (Qwardian versions of the original Syndicate) did. Its members were:

- Deadeye – Green Arrow's counterpart.
- Elasti-Man – Elongated Man's counterpart.
- Element Man – Metamorpho's counterpart.
- Fiero – Fire's counterpart.
- Frostbite – Ice's counterpart.
- Scarab – Blue Beetle's counterpart.
- Slipstream – Kid Flash's counterpart.

It is not clear if any of these characters exist in post-Zero Hour or post-Infinite Crisis continuity.

=== Antimatter Earth line-up ===
The JLA: Earth 2 graphic novel featured several costumes in the Syndicate Satellite (the CSA Watchtower).

The Crime Syndicate's members included also:

- White Martian – Martian Manhunter's antimatter counterpart. After arriving on Earth, he became Ultraman's chief rival and was eventually killed by him.
- Barracuda – Aquaman's counterpart, who has a fish-like appearance.
- Blood Eagle – Hawkman's counterpart. Killed by the Crime Syndicate.
- Doctor Noon - Doctor Mid-Nite's counterpart.
- Space Man - Starman's counterpart.
- White Cat - Black Canary's counterpart.

=== Crime Society line-up ===
- Annataz Arataz - Zatanna's counterpart.
- White Cat - Black Canary's counterpart.
- Ultragirl - Supergirl's counterpart.

The Society also contains unnamed counterparts of Martian Manhunter, Stargirl, Hawkgirl, Wildcat, and Spectre.

=== The New 52 / DC Rebirth line-up ===
In addition to the five founding members, The New 52 version of the team introduces five new members:

- Outsider - Alfred Pennyworth's counterpart.
- Atomica – Atom's counterpart and Johnny Quick's girlfriend.
- Deathstorm – Firestorm's counterpart.
- Sea King – Aquaman's counterpart.
- Grid – A sentient computer virus in a robot body made from Cyborg's old prosthetic parts. Unlike his teammates, Grid is not from Earth-3, instead hailing from Earth-0/Prime Earth.

When Pandora was transported to Earth-3, she meets an unnamed counterpart of Martian Manhunter.

=== Infinite Frontier line-up ===
Following Death Metal, the new lineup features Ultraman, Owlman, Atomica, Donna Troy as Superwoman, Jonathan Chambers as Johnny Quick, and John Stewart as Emerald Knight / Power Ring. After Amanda Waller takes over, Atomica disappears, Ultraman is imprisoned in the Phantom Zone, and Owlman's back is broken. Superwoman, Quick, and Power Ring are then joined by Nocturna, Match, Black Siren, and an alternate Etrigan known as Etrigan the Brainiac 666.

== Other versions ==
=== Destiny's Hand ===
An evil alternate universe iteration of the Justice League created by Doctor Destiny appears in the Justice League America story arc "Destiny's Hand", consisting of Martian Manhunter, Green Lantern, Hawkman, the Flash, the Atom, Red Tornado, Black Canary, Firestorm, and Green Arrow. Additionally, Batman was originally a member before he resigned due to the League's ruthless pursuit of justice.

=== I Can't Believe It's Not the Justice League ===
A group loosely based on the Crime Syndicate called the Power Posse appear in the JLA Classified story arc "I Can't Believe It's Not the Justice League", consisting of Maxwell Lord, Sue Dibny, Oberon, Booster Gold, Metamorpho, G'nort, Mistress Mary, Billy, and Tiffany. This group are enemies of the Super Buddies based out of a strip club.

=== JLA: Another Nail ===
An alternate universe iteration of the Crime Syndicate appear in JLA: Another Nail.

=== Prime Earth ===
Deathstroke founded a version of the Crime Syndicate, unrelated to the Earth 3 team, as a successor group to the Secret Society of Super Villains, joined by Terra, Mammoth, Clock King, Psycho-Pirate, Vanadia, and a brainwashed Frost.

== In other media ==
=== Television ===
The Injustice Syndicate from The Brave and the Bold. From left to right: Dyna-Mite, Rubber Man, Blue Bowman, Silver Cyclone, Scarlet Scarab, Barracuda and Blaze

- A group inspired by the Crime Syndicate called the Super Enemies appeared in The World's Greatest Super Friends episode "Universe of Evil", consisting of evil versions of the Super Friends - Superman, Batman, Wonder Woman, Aquaman, Robin, and Gleek. Additionally, evil versions of the Wonder Twins appear in silhouette. The evil Superman attempts to make Mount Vesuvius erupt despite being hindered by his heroic counterpart, only for the resulting explosion to send the heroic Superman to the Super Enemies' universe. With the help of a scientist from the alternate universe, Superman manages to undo the switch.
- The Crime Syndicate were intended to appear in the Justice League two-part episode "A Better World", but were replaced with the Justice Lords. Following the death of their universe's Flash at the hands of President Lex Luthor, who Superman killed in retaliation, the Justice Lords began ruling their world with an iron fist to end war and crime.
  - Robotic doubles of the Justice Lords appear in the Justice League Unlimited episode "Divided We Fall", in which Luthor / Brainiac creates them to fight the Justice League.
- The Crime Syndicate, renamed the Injustice Syndicate, appear in the Batman: The Brave and the Bold episode "Deep Cover for Batman!", led by Owlman and consisting of Silver Cyclone (Red Tornado's counterpart), Blue Bowman (Green Arrow's counterpart), Blaze (Fire's counterpart), Scarlet Scarab (Blue Beetle's counterpart), Dyna-Mite (Atom's counterpart), Rubber Man (Plastic Man's counterpart), and Barracuda (Aquaman's counterpart). Additionally, unnamed counterparts of B'wana Beast and Wildcat appear in flashbacks.

=== Film ===
- A Justice League direct-to-video film was planned, called Justice League: Worlds Collide, in which the Crime Syndicate would have been the main antagonists and would have taken place during the gap between Justice League and Justice League Unlimited. However, it went unproduced and eventually became Justice League: Crisis on Two Earths.

The Crime Syndicate as seen in Justice League: Crisis on Two Earths. From left to right: Power Ring, Johnny Quick, Ultraman, Superwoman, and Owlman

- The Crime Syndicate appear in Justice League: Crisis on Two Earths, led by Ultraman, Superwoman, Owlman, Johnny Quick, Power Ring, and J'edd J'arkus (Martian Manhunter's counterpart). This version of the group consist of the aforementioned members, the "Bosses", with Ultraman as the "Boss of Bosses", and their "Made Men", lower-tier villains who were granted superpowers by the Bosses in exchange for joining the Syndicate, are divided into several factions per boss, and are as follows: Mister Action (Jimmy Olsen's counterpart), Black Power (Black Lightning's counterpart), Model Citizen (Looker's counterpart), Sai (Katana's counterpart), Aurora (Halo's counterpart), Captain Super (Captain Marvel's counterpart), Uncle Super (Uncle Marvel's counterpart), Captain Super Jr. (Captain Marvel Jr.'s counterpart), Warwolf (Lobo's counterpart), Archer (Green Arrow's counterpart), Scream Queen (Black Canary's counterpart), Olympia (Wonder Girl's counterpart), Breakdance (Vibe's counterpart), Extruded Man (Elongated Man's counterpart), Vamp (Vixen's counterpart), Gypsy Woman (Gypsy's counterpart), Angelique (Hawkgirl's counterpart), Manhawk (Hawkman's counterpart), Mister Horrific (Mister Terrific's counterpart), Megamorpho (Metamorpho's counterpart), She-Bat (an amalgam of Catwoman and Man-Bat), and unnamed counterparts of Wildcat, Sandman, Blue Beetle, Power Girl, Doctor Fate, Zatanna, Firestorm, Red Tornado, Cyborg, and Swamp Thing.
- The Crime Syndicate appear in Justice League: Crisis on Infinite Earths, consisting of Ultraman, Owlman, Superwoman, Power Ring and Johnny Quick.

=== Video games ===
- The Crime Syndicate appear in DC Universe Online, consisting of Ultraman, Owlman, Superwoman, and Johnny Quick.
- The Crime Syndicate appear in Lego DC Super-Villains, consisting of Ultraman, Owlman, Superwoman, Power Ring, Johnny Quick, Sea King, Grid, Deathstorm, and Atomica.

== See also ==
- Squadron Sinister
