= Ultraman (DC Comics) =

DC Comics character

- The Pre-Crisis Earth-Three Ultraman as depicted in Convergence: Crime Syndicate #1 (April 2015). Art by Phil Winslade (pencils and inks) and Lovern Kindzierski (colors).

Publication information
- Publisher: DC Comics
- First appearance: Justice League of America #29 (August 1964)
- Created by: Gardner Fox; Mike Sekowsky

In-story information
- Alter ego: Clark Kent; Kal-Il (New 52 Earth 3); Kal-El (Infinite Frontier Earth 3)
- Species: Kryptonian
- Team affiliations: Crime Syndicate/Society of America/Amerika
- Abilities: See list: Superhuman strength, endurance, hearing, speed, agility and reflexes; Superhuman vision; Heat vision; Electromagnetic spectrum vision; Microscopic vision; X-ray vision; Telescopic vision; Infrared vision; Superhuman breath; Freeze and wind breath; Accelerated healing; Invulnerability; Flight

Ultraman is a supervillain appearing in American comic books published by DC Comics. The character is an evil alternate-universe counterpart of Superman and leader of the Crime Syndicate. Ultraman first appeared in Justice League of America #29 (August 1964).

He has been portrayed in live-action by Tom Welling on the television series Smallville and by David Corenswet in the 2025 film Superman.

== Publication history ==
Having created the worlds of Earth-One, containing Silver Age superheroes, as well as Earth-Two, containing the Golden Age ones, DC Comics decided to expand the universe to include various themed universes. The first of these was Earth-Three, in which there were villainous counterparts of DC's heroes as well as heroic counterparts of DC's villains. Ultraman is seemingly killed in Crisis on Infinite Earths when Earth-Three is destroyed by an anti-matter wave. Following this, Ultraman appears in Animal Man and Infinite Crisis.

Post-Crisis, in Grant Morrison's JLA: Earth 2 graphic novel, Ultraman is portrayed as existing in an anti-matter universe. He is later killed at the conclusion of the Final Crisis series.

Ultraman also appears in the Infinite Crisis and Convergence events.

Following the New 52 reboot, the character was reintroduced when a new Earth-3 universe was created.

Following the reboot of the multiverse after Dark Nights: Death Metal, a new Earth-3 with Ultraman is created.

== Fictional character biography ==
=== Pre-Crisis ===
Ultraman exists in the universe of Earth-Three. Unlike Superman, Ultraman is empowered by green kryptonite, developing a new superpower with each new exposure. In one such encounter, Ultraman gains the ability to see through dimensional barriers, making the Crime Syndicate aware of the multiverse. This allows the Syndicate to attack the Justice League and Justice Society of Earth-1. Ultraman differs from Superman in that his version of the planet Krypton has not exploded.

In the early 1980s, Ultraman teamed up with Lex Luthor of Earth-One, and Alexei Luthor of Earth-Two, in an unsuccessful attempt to eliminate the Supermen of both Earth-One and Earth-Two. Later, Ultraman joined the rest of the Crime Syndicate in a team-up with a time-traveling villain named Per Degaton, who had found their prison and released them. Degaton used them in his attempt to conquer Earth-Two, by stealing nuclear missiles from the Cuban Missile Crisis of Earth Prime, though they planned to betray him. This proved unsuccessful, as well, and he hurled them into the future of Earth-1, having made sure this would happen if they touched him, and the events were wiped from the timeline afterwards. The original Ultraman is killed in the 1985 series Crisis on Infinite Earths when the Anti-Monitor destroys Earth-Three. Ultraman and the original Crime Syndicate return in the Convergence storyline.

=== Early Modern Age ===
Ultraman is from Qward (the antimatter counterpart of Oa) and more powerful than his counterpart Superman.

=== Post-Zero Hour ===
Antimatter Clark Kent as Ultraman.

The Crime Syndicate of America (CSA) is revealed to the Justice League by Alexander Luthor, the heroic antimatter counterpart to Lex Luthor. The CSA comes from an antimatter universe, each member being the counterpart to a core League member.

Ultraman is Lieutenant Clark Kent, a human astronaut from the antimatter Earth. After his ship imploded into hyperspace, an unknown alien race reconstructed Kent in an attempt to repair the damaged astronaut, which ended up altering him both mentally and physically, giving him "ultrapowers" similar to Superman's superpowers. According to Alexander Luthor, the process also twisted Ultraman's mind. In contrast to Superman, Ultraman's power relies on his proximity and exposure to a substance called anti-kryptonite; the longer and farther he is separated from it, the weaker he becomes. This substance has no apparent effect on Superman, just as kryptonite has been shown to have no effect on Ultraman.

Clark is unhappily married to his Crime Syndicate teammate Superwoman, who uses the alias Lois Lane. In the early 2000s, the two had a child together, but Superwoman maintains a periodic affair with another member of the Crime Syndicate, Owlman, much to Ultraman's frustration.

Clark Kent returns to Earth and again leads the Crime Syndicate. In an attempt to repair their Earth after the destruction done by the Weaponers of Qward, the Syndicate kidnaps people from all 52 universes. Ultraman, Owlman and Superwoman are banished to an alternate dimension by Superman after Superman defeats Ultraman in a fight.

Ultraman is recruited on a journey to Limbo, along with several other alternate universe Supermen, briefly working with Superman to defeat Mandrakk, the dark Monitor. He is then converted into a vampiric being. Ultraman is apparently killed by the united Supermen alongside Mandrakk.

=== 52 ===
A new version of Earth-Three is shown as one universe amongst the post-Crisis DC Multiverse. The team is named the Crime Society of America.

The Society make their first solo appearance in Countdown Presents The Search for Ray Palmer: Crime Society. In subsequent appearances, the Crime Society are agents of Monarch's Multiversal army. Ultraman, along with several other members of the Crime Society, were in the Earth-51 dimension when Superman-Prime destroyed the Monarch's containment armor, unleashing all of Monarch's quantum energy, which destroyed the entire dimension. As such, Ultraman is presumed dead along with his fellow Crime Society members. Ultraman appears in The Brave and the Bold, powered by the same kryptonite that weakens Superman. He is brought to the main earth by Mixyezpitelik, the antimatter universe counterpart of Mister Mxyzptlk, to help Superman defeat Megistus.

=== New 52 reboot ===
Ultraman, originally Kal-Il, comes from a version of Krypton whose people were mean-spirited and selfish. Just before this Krypton was destroyed, Kal-Il's parents Jor-Il and Lara sent him to Earth-3 to one day seek vengeance against the being that destroyed Krypton (whom Jor-Il inadvertently summoned), teaching him to become the strongest being on the planet, or become nothing at all. Upon his arrival on Earth-3, the young Kal-Il coerced two alcoholic drug addicts, Johnny and Martha Kent, to adopt him, only to murder them years later once he had no further need of them. He went on to found the Crime Syndicate and take over the world. Ultraman is a violent, homicidal megalomaniac, as well as an elitist and Darwinist who values strength and selfishness, and hates weakness and altruism. After Earth-3 was devastated by the same being that destroyed Krypton-3, Ultraman leads the Crime Syndicate to the Prime Earth to conquer it.

During the "Darkseid War" storyline, Ultraman is released and given kryptonite to battle the former Anti-Monitor: Mobius. When Ultraman attacks Mobius by himself against Superman's advice, he is overpowered and killed. During the "Year of the Villain" storyline, Ultraman is restored alongside Earth-Three.

=== Infinite Frontier ===
Kal-Il is the last survivor of the dead planet Krypton, sent to Earth as a baby. He was found by Jonathan and Martha Kent, who adopted him and named him Clark. His powers manifested early and he never bothered to hide them, so the other children were afraid of and ostracised him, telling him that he was from space. The Kents exploited Clark and his powers for free labor, teaching him that obedience was the ultimate virtue and that people who did not contribute to society were to be reviled as "freeloaders". They also manipulated him to be emotionally dependent on them so that he would never leave the farm. When he was a teenager in 1963 his parents showed him his spacecraft and revealed to him that he was the last of his kind, telling him they were all he had. They hoped this would make him afraid to ever break free of them, but in fact he turned on them, realizing that they had only ever taken advantage of him. He flew away from Smallville, carrying his ship.

Ultraman reveals himself to the world on November 22, 1963 by assassinating John F. Kennedy with his heat vision. He is the world's only known metahuman until other beings with unnatural powers emerge in 2021. He rules Metropolis as a semi-benevolent dictator, beloved by some but feared and hated by many others. Ultraman allows the people of Metropolis limited freedom but tolerates no dissent. The only people who challenge him openly are Lex Luthor and Cat Grant.

Following the Starro invasion, a number of metahumans reveal themselves to the world, and Luthor recruits them into the Legion of Justice. Owlman and Superwoman approach Ultraman for an alliance to counter Luthor and rule the world, offering to make him their leader. Ultraman accepts and Superwoman also offers herself to him, hoping to conceive an heir.

The Legion of Justice, aided by Ultraman's cousin Ultragirl, fight against the Crime Syndicate of America, during which Atomica kills Ultragirl. Ultraman is defeated when the Crime Syndicate comes into conflict with the Suicide Squad, which Amanda Waller combines with the remaining Crime Syndicate into a new Justice League.

In Adventures of Superman: Jon Kent, Ultraman would encounter Jon once more, overpowering him and threatening both to murder the Lois Lane of Jon's Earth and resume his previous torture of Jon in the volcano, only to be killed when the Superman of the Injustice universe intervenes and snaps Ultraman's neck.

== Powers and abilities ==
Ultraman possesses the same superpowers as Superman. However, he is sometimes portrayed as weakened by yellow sunlight or empowered by green or blue kryptonite. In Silver Age stories, green kryptonite would bestow additional powers on him, including the ability to see other universes. In addition, Ultraman lacks Superman's vulnerability to magic.

Superman noted during one conflict that Ultraman's focus on killing his enemies actually made him weaker than Superman, as he killed new superhumans who may not even fully know what they were capable of, whereas Superman letting his enemies live meant that he had to improve his own fighting skills just as his opponents learned what they were capable of. As a result, where Superman has actual experience, he declares that Ultraman basically just "sits on a pile of skulls and calls [himself] tough", having no real combat skills beyond his raw strength.

== In other media ==
=== Television ===
- Ultraman appears in The World's Greatest Super Friends episode "Universe of Evil", voiced by Danny Dark. Named Kal-Ul, he hails from Earth-Three, having been sent from that universe's version of Krypton. Upon his arrival on Earth, he continued growing stronger until he reached adulthood, renamed himself "Ultraman", began a life of destruction, and eventually founded the Super Enemies.
- Ultraman appears in the tenth season of Smallville, portrayed by Tom Welling. This version is Clark Luthor, Clark Kent's Earth-Two doppelganger who is raised as Lionel Luthor's murderous son. Additionally, he is vulnerable to all kinds of kryptonite and bears an L-shaped scar on his right arm due to Gold kryptonite.

=== Film ===
- Ultraman appears in Justice League: Crisis on Two Earths, voiced by Brian Bloom. This version is the leader of the Crime Syndicate and is vulnerable to blue kryptonite.
- Ultraman appears in Justice League: Crisis on Infinite Earths, voiced by Matt Lanter.
- Ultraman appears in Superman, portrayed by David Corenswet. This version is an unintelligent clone of Superman created by LuthorCorp who is dependent on Lex Luthor's orders and operated as the Hammer of Boravia. During their fight, Ultraman's true identity was revealed before Superman ultimately threw him into a black hole.

=== Video games ===
- Ultraman appears as a boss in DC Universe Online as part of the "Earth-3" DLC.
- Ultraman appears as a playable character in Lego DC Super-Villains, voiced by Nolan North.

== See also ==
- List of Superman enemies
