= Justice League: Crisis on Two Earths =

2010 film directed by Lauren Montgomery, Sam Liu

- DVD cover art
- Directed by: Sam Liu; Lauren Montgomery
- Written by: Dwayne McDuffie
- Produced by: Bruce Timm; Bobbie Page
- Starring: William Baldwin; Mark Harmon; Vanessa Marshall; Chris Noth; Gina Torres; James Woods; Josh Keaton
- Edited by: Margaret Hou
- Music by: James L. Venable; Christopher Drake
- Production companies: Warner Bros. Animation; Warner Premiere; DC Entertainment
- Distributed by: Warner Home Video
- Release date: February 23, 2010
- Running time: 75 minutes
- Country: United States
- Language: English

Justice League: Crisis on Two Earths is a 2010 American animated superhero film directed by Lauren Montgomery and Sam Liu and written by Dwayne McDuffie. It is based on the abandoned direct-to-video feature Justice League: Worlds Collide, which was intended as a bridge between the DC Animated Universe series Justice League and Justice League Unlimited, and reworked to act as a standalone story. It is the seventh film of the DC Universe Animated Original Movies.

The premise of Crisis on Two Earths is borrowed from the 1964 Gardner Fox Justice League of America #29–30 story entitled "Crisis on Earth-Three!" and the 2000 Grant Morrison JLA: Earth 2 graphic novel, with a heroic Lex Luthor from an alternate universe coming to the Justice League's universe for help against the Crime Syndicate.

Justice League: Crisis on Two Earths was released on February 23, 2010. The two-disc special edition DVD includes an animated short featuring the Spectre. On August 11, 2015, Warner Home Video re-released the film in a combo pack which includes a DVD and Blu-ray copy, a digital copy, and the JLA: Earth 2 graphic novel.

A sequel, Justice League: Doom, was released in February 2012.

== Plot ==
In an alternate universe, heroic versions of Lex Luthor and Joker (called the Jester) steal a device called the "Quantum Trigger" from the headquarters of the Crime Syndicate. When an alarm is tripped, the Jester sacrifices himself to allow Luthor to escape from the Syndicate. Luthor escapes to the Earth of the Justice League by activating a device that enables interdimensional travel.

The Justice League is summoned to a prison where Luthor is kept, and Superman's X-ray vision confirms Luthor's reversed organs indicate that he is from a parallel Earth. The Justice League take the alternate Luthor to the Watchtower, where they learn of the Syndicate threat. As the Justice League debates the matter, Luthor hides the Quantum Trigger on the satellite. With the exception of Batman, the rest of the Justice League travel to Luthor's Earth.

Upon arrival, the heroes attack Syndicate targets. After a successful series of raids in which they capture Ultraman, the League confronts President Slade Wilson, who releases Ultraman and explains that acceding to the Syndicate's demands saves millions of lives. Martian Manhunter, in turn, falls in love with Wilson's daughter Rose. Superwoman and three of her lieutenants arrive at the League's dimension, and on the Watchtower, battle the rest of the Justice League, including Batman. They escape with the Quantum Trigger, but Batman follows them, battles Superwoman on the Syndicate's Earth and captures her. Rose learns of the Syndicate base to allow the Justice League to confront them. The League arrives at the Crime Syndicate's Moon base with Superwoman, and eventually battles the Syndicate.

Owlman, in secret, has developed a weapon, the Quantum Eigenstate Device (Q.E.D.). Believing the idea that nothing they do can possibly matter, he teleports to Earth Prime to destroy all of reality by obliterating the original universe from which the multiverse spawned, deeming it the sole action he could take without creating an alternate universe where he makes an opposite choice. Luthor speculates that a speedster might be able to vibrate and match the Q.E.D.'s temporal vibration and open a portal. After Batman forbids Flash from doing so, Johnny Quick volunteers. Batman pursues Owlman and duels him. At the end of the fight, Batman teleports Owlman and the Q.E.D. to an uninhabited frozen Earth. Although Owlman has time to deactivate the bomb, he chooses not to, acknowledging that an alternate version of himself in the multiverse would do the opposite, rendering his decision meaningless. He instead allows the device to detonate, killing himself.

Batman returns to the Syndicate's Earth, where Quick dies from the strain of acting as a vibratory conduit. President Wilson arrests the rest of the Crime Syndicate, and Martian Manhunter says goodbye to Rose to return with the Justice League. Upon returning to their Earth, Batman and Superman discuss a membership drive for the Justice League.

== Voice cast ==
- William Baldwin as Bruce Wayne / Batman
- Mark Harmon as Kal-El / Clark Kent / Superman
- Chris Noth as Lex Luthor
- Gina Torres as Superwoman
- James Woods as Owlman
- Brian Bloom as Ultraman
- Jonathan Adams as J'onn J'onzz / Martian Manhunter
- Josh Keaton as Flash (credited), Aquaman (uncredited)
- Vanessa Marshall as Princess Diana / Wonder Woman
- Bruce Davison as President Slade Wilson
- Freddi Rogers as Rose Wilson
- James Patrick Stuart as Johnny Quick (credited), The Jester (uncredited)
- Nolan North as Hal Jordan / Green Lantern (credited), Power Ring (uncredited)
- Jim Meskimen as Captain Super (credited), Archer (uncredited)
- Kari Wührer as Model Citizen (credited), Black Canary (uncredited)
- Bruce Timm as Uncle Super (credited), Captain Super Jr. (uncredited)
- Carlos Alazraqui as Breakdance (credited), Secret Service Agent (uncredited)
- Cedric Yarbrough as Firestorm (credited), Black Lightning (uncredited), Black Power (uncredited)
- Richard Green as Jimmy Olsen / Mr. Action
- Andrea Romano as Watchtower Computer (credited), Reporter (uncredited)

== Production ==
In 2004, Bruce Timm revealed that a DCAU direct-to-video Justice League feature was in development to connect Justice League and Justice League Unlimited. The film was titled as Justice League: Worlds Collide. One of the objectives of the film was to explain how Wonder Woman acquired her Invisible-Jet. The project was ultimately scrapped by Warner Bros.; however, in 2008, Timm stated that Justice League: Worlds Collide could be released someday in the future.

Finally, Worlds Collide was rewritten by Dwayne McDuffie for DC Universe Animated Original Movies as Justice League: Crisis on Two Earths, but removing all connections with the animated series.

== Soundtrack ==
Justice League: Crisis on Two Earths (Soundtrack from the DC Universe Animated Original Movie)

Film score (Digital download) by James L. Venable with Christopher Drake
- Released: February 23, 2010
- Label: New Line Records

Track listing
No.	Title	Length
1.	"Break In"	3:13
2.	"Finish What the Jester Started / Main Title"	3:24
3.	"Only Surviving Member / Police Station / Of Course We'll Help"	3:09
4.	"Headquarters Battle"	4:07
5.	"Battle in the Sky"	3:59
6.	"QED Monologue / Crime Syndicate / Made Men / Flash and Jon[sic] Shipyard Battle"	4:53
7.	"Sup and Lex Fight Jimmy and Ultraman"	3:07
8.	"Owlman Multiverse Monologue / President Office Monologue"	2:25
9.	"Rose Garden and Ultraman Intimidation / Superwoman Toys with Bats / Batman Pissed at Luthor / Sniper Red Archer / Owlman Gets Quantum Trigger"	4:31
10.	"Perimeter Breach Watchtower"	5:10
11.	"Rose and Jon Mindmeld / Owlman's End / Batman Owlman Fight"	4:44
12.	"Moonbase Intro / Is This Just a Little Too Easy / Moonbase Battle"	6:25
13.	"Teleport"	3:10
14.	"John Says Goodbye / Johnny Burns Out / Cavalry"	3:37
15.	"Ending / End Credits"	4:04
Total length:		57:58

== Reception ==
Justice League: Crisis on Two Earths received positive reviews. The World's Finest stated "...the film ranks up there as one of Dwayne McDuffie's better works in the animated DC world and even though it's reminiscent of stories we've seen in animation before, the brilliant work done by Moi, the directing by Sam Liu and Lauren Montgomery, and story make it more than worth watching again."

It earned $8,641,856 from domestic home video sales.

== See also ==
- Justice League: Doom, a standalone sequel also written by McDuffie and using the same character designs.
- Justice League: Crisis on Infinite Earths, a separate trilogy of films with similar concepts released in 2024.
