= Johnny Quick (Crime Syndicate) =

Fictional DC comics characters

Publication information
- Publisher: DC Comics
- First appearance: "Crisis on Earth Three!", Justice League of America #29 (August 1964)
- Created by: Gardner Fox (writer); Mike Sekowsky (artist)

In-story information
- Full name: Jonathan "Johnny" Allen; Jonathan "Johnny" Chambers
- Species: Metahuman
- Place of origin: Earth-Three (pre-Crisis), Antimatter Earth (post-Crisis), Earth-3 (post-52), Earth 3 (post-New 52; post-Rebirth)
- Team affiliations: Crime Syndicate of America; Crime Syndicate of Amerika; Crime Society of America
- Abilities: Superhuman speed

Johnny Quick is the name of several supervillains appearing in stories published by DC Comics. All are evil or corrupted alternate-universe counterparts of the Flash. Johnny Quick first appeared in Justice League of America #29 (August 1964) alongside the rest of the Crime Syndicate of America.

== Fictional character biography ==
=== Crime Syndicate of America ===
Johnny Quick is a supervillain on the alternate Earth designated as Earth-Three and a counterpart of the Flash. He and the other members of the Crime Syndicate of America (villainous counterparts of Justice League of America) are Earth-Three's only superpowered beings and fought both Earth-One's JLA and Earth-Two's Justice Society of America. In Crisis on Infinite Earths, Quick and the Crime Syndicate are killed when the Anti-Monitor destroys Earth-Three with a wave of antimatter. The Crime Syndicate returns in Convergence, where Brainiac retrieves them and other inhabitants of doomed universes.

=== Anti-Matter Johnny Quick ===
The character was revived in the 1990s as a villain from the "Anti-Matter Universe", rather than being from Earth-Three. Unlike the Flash, Johnny receives his powers by injecting himself with a drug called "Speed Juice" which has Quick hopelessly addicted to and he goes into massive physical withdrawal without it.

=== Crime Society of America ===
In 52, an alternate version of Earth-Three called Earth-3 was shown as a part of the new multiverse. In the depiction were characters that are altered versions of the original Justice League of America, including the Flash. The names of the characters and the team are not mentioned in the two panels in which they appear, but the altered Flash is visually similar to the Crime Syndicate Johnny Quick.

According to Grant Morrison, this alternate universe is not the pre-Crisis Earth-Three, making a new character unrelated to previous versions as Earth-3 is a world populated by evil counterparts of Earth-2 heroes, where Quick is part of a "Golden Age" "Crime Society".

=== The New 52 and DC Rebirth ===
In The New 52 continuity reboot, Johnny Quick is one of the members of the Crime Syndicate to arrive from Earth 3 at the conclusion of the "Trinity War" event. On Earth 3, Jonathan Allen works with Rhonda Pineda as professional thieves and killers. One night after killing two cops, "Johnny and Rhonnie", as they are known, end up cornered on the roof of S.T.A.R. Labs during a storm. Allen is hit by lightning, which gives him superhuman speed.

During the 2013 event Forever Evil, Quick invades Iron Heights Penitentiary and frees its inmates. When Lex Luthor's team infiltrates the Watchtower, Quick joins in the fight against them, during which Captain Cold freezes one of his legs and breaks it off. Alexander Luthor of Earth 3 as Mazahs kills Quick and steals his powers.

Johnny Quick is resurrected during the 2019 event "Year of the Villain". When Perpetua arrives on Earth 3 to get the Crime Syndicate of America on her side, she kills Quick who is opposed to the proposed alliance.

During the 2020 event "Dark Nights: Death Metal", Batman revives Johnny Quick using a Black Lantern ring so he can help fight the forces of the Darkest Knight.

=== Infinite Frontier ===
A fifth incarnation of Johnny Quick, serial killer Jonathan Chambers, is introduced after the multiverse is restored in Dark Nights: Death Metal.

== Powers and abilities ==
All incarnations of Johnny Quick possess the same abilities as the Flash.

== In other media ==
=== Film ===
- Johnny Quick appears in Justice League: Crisis on Two Earths, voiced by James Patrick Stuart. This version resembles the Reverse-Flash and is Australian. While subjugating his Earth, he and the Crime Syndicate battle the Justice League until Owlman betrays the former to destroy Earth-Prime and the multiverse and Quick sacrifices himself to transport Batman to Earth-Prime.
- Johnny Quick appears in Justice League: Crisis on Infinite Earths, voiced by Liam McIntyre.

=== Video games ===
- Johnny Quick appears as a character summon in Scribblenauts Unmasked: A DC Comics Adventure.
- Johnny Quick appears in Lego DC Super-Villains, voiced by Anthony Ingruber. After the Justice League disappear, he and the Crime Syndicate pose as the Justice Syndicate until the Flash and the Reverse-Flash corner and force him to expose the supervillain group's plans.
