= Justice League: Crisis on Infinite Earths =

2024 animated superhero film trilogy

- Trilogy release poster
- Directed by: Jeff Wamester
- Screenplay by: Jim Krieg
- Based on: Crisis on Infinite Earths by: Marv Wolfman; George Pérez
- Produced by: Jim Krieg; Kimberly S. Moreau; Butch Lukic; Sam Register; Michael Uslan
- Starring: Matt Bomer; Jensen Ackles; Darren Criss; Meg Donnelly; Stana Katic; Corey Stoll
- Edited by: Bruce A. King
- Music by: Kevin Riepl
- Production companies: Warner Bros. Animation; DC Entertainment
- Distributed by: Warner Bros. Home Entertainment
- Release dates: January 9, 2024 (Part One); April 29, 2024 (Part Two); July 16, 2024 (Part Three)
- Running time: 93 minutes (Part One); 95 minutes (Part Two); 98 minutes (Part Three)
- Country: United States
- Language: English

Justice League: Crisis on Infinite Earths is a 2024 American animated superhero film trilogy based on the DC Comics superhero team the Justice League and its crossover storyline of the same name (1985–1986), which was written by Marv Wolfman and pencilled by George Pérez as a direct sequel to Justice League: Warworld. The films were directed by Jeff Wamester from a script by Jim Krieg. They are the 54th, 55th, and 56th films of the DC Universe Animated Original Movies. They are the eighth, ninth, and tenth (and final) installments in the second phase of the DC Animated Movie Universe, as well as the 23rd, 24th, and 25th (and final) films overall.

In the film, after Superman, Batman, and Wonder Woman are rescued by Harbinger, the Justice League and their allies are summoned by a Monitor named Mar Novu, to combat an apocalyptic event instigated by the malevolent entity known as the Anti-Monitor, to prevent him from destroying the multiverse.

Justice League: Crisis on Infinite Earths – Part One was released on January 9, 2024. Part Two was released on April 23, and Part Three was released on July 16.

The films are both dedicated to comic artist George Pérez who died on May 6, 2022, and longtime Batman voice actor Kevin Conroy who died that same year on November 10.

== Plot ==
=== Part One ===
Barry Allen experiences "time trips" from key moments in his life. (Note: Previously depicted on Earth during the events of Justice League: Warworld (2023).) One of these moments is a fight with the android Amazo, during which Superman (fictional universe Earth-One) gets injured and is brought to Bruce Wayne for medical help. (Note: As depicted in the post-credits scene of Batman: The Long Halloween (2021).) In response, Barry suggests forming a team with Clark, Bruce, Oliver Queen, fashion model Mari McCabe, and J'onn J'onzz, the Martian who works as a private detective, John Jones. (Note: Hal Jordan later joins the Justice League sometime before the events of Green Lantern: Beware My Power (2022).) Amazo appears at the unveiling of the Justice League headquarters, as its primary function has been altered by Superman's archenemy Lex Luthor from improving human life to killing anyone who is not human. The League cannot defeat Amazo due to the latter's ability, Parasite, to steal their abilities. The Flash visits Dr. Anthony Ivo, a scientist who has contracted progeria and is dying. While researching quantum energy absorption with Luthor, Ivo created Amazo in hopes of finding a way to extend human life. Ivo sacrifices himself to depower Amazo. Batman deduces that Luthor gave Ivo the disease to prompt his experiments. Hearing this, Amazo turns against Luthor, but chooses justice over vengeance after the Flash's intervention. With Luthor arrested, Amazo returns the stolen powers to their respective heroes before shutting down.

Meanwhile, Barry is sent by a mysterious man to Earth-Three, a parallel Earth. There, Barry is captured by the Crime Syndicate – tyrannical doppelgängers of the Justice League – and is taken to their Hall of Crime. Using her Lasso of Submission, Superwoman interrogates Barry, who confirms the existence of the Multiverse. This inspires the Syndicate to plot a multiversal takeover, having grown bored with ruling their Earth. However, an antimatter wave then threatens Earth-Three. The Syndicate attempts to halt it, but is consumed by the wave, which eventually destroys the world. Barry's doppelgänger Johnny Quick, sacrifices himself to allow Barry to tap fully into the Speed Force and escape Earth-Three before its destruction. The mysterious man witnesses the parallel Earth being destroyed as his punishment and says that Barry shares the guilt. (Note: As depicted in Justice League Dark: Apokolips War (2020) and the short film Constantine: The House of Mystery (2022).)

On the day of Barry and Iris West's wedding, Harbinger appears and recruits Barry, Oliver, Mari, and John Stewart / Green Lantern to go to a space station called the Satellite. Harbinger has gathered various heroes and super-powered people from Earth-One, and several other Earths, on behalf of Mar Novu, a member of an ancient multiversal race called the Monitors. Flash reunites with Earth-Two heroes: the Justice Society, including their Wonder Woman, Superman, and Hawkman. Batman meets Earth-Two's Robin (Dick Grayson) and Huntress (Helena Wayne), the daughter of that world's Bruce Wayne and Catwoman. When the Legion of Super-Heroes member Dawnstar is brought aboard, Harbinger reveals herself to be Supergirl.

Novu explains that an antimatter wave, which has been destroying universes, threatens the multiverse. Barry's time-tripping inspires Novu and his council of "thinkers" (consisting of Wonder Woman; Earth-One's Doctor Light, Hawkgirl, and Mister Terrific; Earth-Four's Blue Beetle and Question; and Earth-146's Aquaman) to create vibrational towers on the remaining Earths that will allow them to phase through the wave and survive. However, the wave spreads before the towers are completed.

Barry uses his powers to slow time for him and Iris, and they grow old together while completing Earth-One's tower with the help of Amazo. Upon completing the tower, the elderly Iris dies. The elderly Barry reverts to normal speed and activates the tower network by using a cosmic treadmill. The vibrational energy destroys his tower and Amazo, but causes the wave to pass through the various Earths and dissipate. The Spectre then appears and claims that Barry bears responsibility for the Crisis, but that it is up to the Speed Force to determine Barry's fate. Barry is then sent back to the moment he first gains his powers, when he has an epiphany. He appears as a vision to Batman when the latter was trapped in the Warlord illusion of Warworld, telling him to return to before "the beginning". (Note: As depicted during the events of Justice League: Warworld.) Barry then vanishes as he dies. On the space station, Supergirl discovers that the Crisis has caused a temporal paradox when she sees the Legion of Super-Heroes, including Dawnstar and her boyfriend Brainiac 5, fade as the 31st century no longer exists, foreshadowing events that have yet to come.

=== Part Two ===
When Krypton was destroyed, (Note: As depicted in Legion of Super-Heroes (2023).) Kara Zor-El's escape pod hit Novu's Satellite. Reluctantly at first, Novu rescued and educated her as his companion. When it became clear that Kara had lost her memory, he decided not to tell her of her home world's fate. Eventually, Kara found the escape pod in storage and learned the truth. Enraged at Novu for refusing to prevent Krypton's destruction and deceiving her, she goaded him to reveal that her cousin Kal-El was alive on Earth, prompting her to find him. Novu continued to observe her, including her training with the Legion of Super-Heroes. When Kara, now Supergirl, returned to Earth in search of Superman and Batman, Novu used their shared past to convince her to help him. Absorbing a portion of his power, Kara assumed the form of Harbinger to gather various heroes and bring them to the Satellite.

Years before on Earth-Two, Psycho-Pirate interrogated a codebreaker, his Earth's Doctor Fate. To get Fate to talk, he explained his background. Believing that Psycho-Pirate had a role to play in the Crisis, Doctor Fate gave him the ability to travel between universes. After the plan of his, under the alias of Advisor, to use the Atlanteans to attack the United States failed, (Note: As depicted in Justice Society: World War II (2021).) Psycho-Pirate used his new ability to leave Earth-Two and escape capture by Earth-One's Flash. Psycho-Pirate then traveled the multiverse, trying and failing to take over various Earths, before being recruited by Harbinger and brought to the Satellite with the heroes.

Time has passed since the antimatter wave hit Earth-One, and what was thought to be a single wave has turned out to be a series of antimatter waves. Many heroes are placed across the multiverse to operate, maintain, and protect the vibrational towers, while Novu's council tries to find a long-term solution. To keep the populations of the parallel Earths calm, they use the Satellite's technology to broadcast Psycho-Pirate's empathic control across the planets. Struggling with the mental strain of the task, Psycho-Pirate persuades Novu to give him some of his power to make it easier. Shortly afterward, Psycho-Pirate is abducted by an entity that is the polar opposite of Novu, the Anti-Monitor, the source of the anti-matter waves. Anti-Monitor offers Psycho-Pirate a new, smaller world to control in exchange for his service.

After a weaker antimatter wave passes over the parallel Earths, shadow demons appear and attack all the towers simultaneously. Superman leads the Justice League to defend Earth-One, Batman defends Earth-Two with the help of a multiversal Bat-Family that now includes Robin (Damian Wayne), Batgirl (Barbara Gordon), Batman Beyond, and Batwing. Wonder Woman joins the fight on Earth-46, an Earth ruled by Amazons. Though they discover that the shadow demons are vulnerable to strong light, their attempts to fight them are undermined by Psycho-Pirate, who uses his enhanced abilities to heighten the heroes' hatreds and rivalries, causing them to turn on each other before he teleports them to another Earth. Due to the shadow demons and Psycho-Pirate's interference, not all of the towers are online when the next antimatter wave hits, and many Earths are erased, including Earth-46. Amid the chaos, a furious Supergirl murders Novu when Psycho-Pirate's powers exacerbate her resentment of him.

While defending Earth-One, John Stewart encounters the mysterious man who sent Barry Allen to Earth-Three and fights him. During their fight, the man remembers his identity as the sorcerer John Constantine. As more shadow demons arrive, Stewart overloads his Green Lantern's battery, using it as a light bomb to destroy the shadow demons attacking Earth-One's tower. In response, the shadow demons coalesce into a single giant figure, revealing that they were the Anti-Monitor's minions and are of one mind, which proves resistant to the heroes' light attacks. Powerless, they watch in horror as the Anti-Monitor prepares to destroy Earth-One.

=== Part Three ===
When Novu died, he released the cosmic energy within him into the Satellite. This gave the heroes enough power to transport the surviving Earths and their Suns into a dimension between the universes called "the Bleed", preventing Earth-One's annihilation. Eight months later, Hawkgirl and Earth-Two's Superman recover Wonder Woman's body in space, Wonder Woman having survived Earth-46's destruction due to her immortality. While they are safe from the Anti-Monitor, the Bleed has different laws of physics: natural disasters occur daily; and beings from parallel Earths' past, present, and future have begun appearing all at once, straining the heroes' collective resources.

After being exposed to Scarecrow's fear gas while fighting Earth-10's Nazi soldiers, Batman remembers an old man, whom he now realizes was a dying Flash, telling him to go back to before "the beginning". Doctor Fate confirms Batman's theory that the solution to the Crisis lies before the multiverse was created. Stewart tells the others about Constantine, who claimed to be from that time. Batman, Fate, Stewart, and Wonder Woman leave the Satellite to find Constantine. Using Fate's magic to restore Constantine's memories, they discover that Constantine's Earth was ravaged by Darkseid. (Note: As depicted in Justice League Dark: Apokolips War.) To restore his Earth, Constantine instructed his Earth's Flash to travel back in time and kill Darkseid when he was vulnerable as an infant.

Earth-10's Lex Luthor arrives on the Satellite, revealing that the Anti-Monitor has found the Bleed and forced its way inside. After it destroys Earth-146 and Earth-2, Question and Earth-1's Lois Lane deduce that Luthor revealed the Bleed's location to the Anti-Monitor in exchange for Earth-10's survival. Luthor and his team of villains have correctly concluded that life in the Bleed is unsustainable, so they captured Psycho-Pirate and tortured him into contacting the Anti-Monitor. Luthor's true goal, however, was to bring the Anti-Monitor to the Bleed so that they could study its weaknesses, kill it, and return to the regular universe safely. After sacrificing Earth-AD (Earth-86) to the Anti-Monitor to see its abilities in action, Luthor suggests that Earth-One's Superman could absorb the solar energy of all the Earths' suns and channel it into a blast strong enough to destroy the Anti-Monitor. Despite knowing that this act would kill him, Superman agrees only for Supergirl to take his place while guilt-ridden over killing Novu. Returning to the universe, they are aided by a new Green Lantern Corps and Martian Manhunter (Note: Martian Manhunter was revealed to have survived the explosion of Warworld in Justice League: Warworld.) commanding the Warworld, who uses Psycho-Pirate to unite all the universes through hope. This energy blast weakens the Anti-Monitor long enough for Supergirl's sacrifice to obliterate it.

As the heroes and villains gather on Warworld, Batman explains Constantine's role in the Crisis, that Darkseid was a fixed point in the universe, and that the temporal paradox resulting from his death, instead of altering a timeline, shattered the universe into two halves, creating a reality with Darkseid and one without him. The multiverse has been dividing infinitely on similar decision points ever since. Because reality cannot cope with many universes, the Anti-Monitor was created as its immune response, killing off universes to prevent the multiverse's total collapse. A race of Anti-Monitors approaches the Satellite and begins destroying Earth-508, Earth-12, Earth-2003, and Earth-10, forcing everyone to see the futility of their efforts and the need to correct Constantine's mistakes.

Constantine suggests fusing the multiverse into a single "Monoverse" that reality could cope with, and Batgirl suggests using the Miracle Machine of Superman enemy Brainiac, which Supergirl had hidden in a pocket dimension before she died. After Nightshade teleports the Miracle Machine to Warworld, Wonder Woman sacrifices herself to provide immortal energy to recharge the machine and create the Monoverse, where the survivors will merge with their counterparts of that universe once they enter with no memories of their lives before the Crisis. Watched by the Spectre, the assembled heroes and villains walk into the Monoverse, except for Question, who rejects the "false reality" on principle, and Psycho-Pirate, whose mind was damaged in order to power Warworld, who has been left to die. Though Constantine braces himself for the Spectre's punishment for ending the multiverse, the latter offers him "hope" instead of "justice". As the Spectre leaves, Constantine considers following everyone, only to instead decline and accompany the Spectre to an unknown fate as the multiverse is ultimately destroyed.

On Themyscira, a young Diana is shown playing on a clifftop in the newly established Monoverse, where Hippolyta’s warning, that she is not immortal, indicates that she will be spared the tragic, unending lifespan of her Earth-Two predecessor.

== Voice cast ==
Voice actor	Character
Introduced in Part One
Darren Criss	Superman / Clark Kent / Kal-El; Superman of Earth-2 / Clark Kent / Kal-L
Jensen Ackles	Batman / Bruce Wayne
Stana Katic	Wonder Woman of Earth-2 / Diana Prince; Superwoman
Matt Bomer	Flash / Barry Allen
Meg Donnelly	Supergirl / Kara Zor-El / Harbinger
Jimmi Simpson	Green Arrow / Oliver Queen
Zachary Quinto	Lex Luthor
Jonathan Adams	Mar Novu / Monitor
Ike Amadi	Martian Manhunter / J'onn J'onzz; Amazing-Man; Dr. Anthony Ivo
Geoffrey Arend	Psycho Pirate of Earth-2; Hawkman
Zach Callison	Dick Grayson; Robin of Earth-2 / Dick Grayson
Alexandra Daddario	Lois Lane
Alastair Duncan	Alfred Pennyworth
Matt Lanter	Blue Beetle of Earth-4 / Ted Kord; Ultraman
Ato Essandoh	Mister Terrific / Michael Holt
Cynthia Hamidi	Dawnstar
Aldis Hodge	Green Lantern / John Stewart; Power Ring
Erika Ishii	Doctor Light / Kimiyo Hoshi; Huntress of Earth-Two / Helena Wayne
David Kaye	Question / Vic Sage; Satellite
Ashleigh LaThrop	Iris West
Liam McIntyre	Aquaman of Earth-146 / Arthur Curry; Johnny Quick
Nolan North	Green Lantern / Hal Jordan; Amazo; Pariah / John Constantine (Note: Credited in Part One as "Homeless Man".)
Lou Diamond Phillips	Spectre; Owlman
Keesha Sharp	Vixen / Mari McCabe
Harry Shum Jr.	Brainiac 5
Introduced in Part Two
Gideon Adlon	Batgirl / Barbara Gordon; Kryptonian Voice
Troy Baker	Joker
Zach Callison	Robin / Damian Wayne
Darin De Paul	Solovar
Ato Essandoh	Anti-Monitor
Keith Ferguson	Doctor Fate of Earth-2 / Kent Nelson; Atomic Knight
Will Friedle	Batman Beyond / Terry McGinnis; Kamandi
Jennifer Hale	Alura; Hippolyta of Earth-46
Jamie Gray Hyder	Hawkgirl / Shayera Hol
Matt Ryan	John Constantine
Introduced in Part Three
Brian Bloom	Adam Strange; Sidewinder
Ashly Burch	Nightshade of Earth-4; Mera of Earth-146
Kevin Conroy	Batman of Earth-12 / Bruce Wayne
Brett Dalton	Bat-Lash; Captain Atom / Allen Adam of Earth-4
John DiMaggio	Lobo
Keith Ferguson	Two-Face / Harvey Dent
Jennifer Hale	Aya
Mark Hamill	Joker of Earth-12
Jamie Gray Hyder	Young Diana Prince
David Kaye	Cardonian Lantern
Cynthia Kaye McWilliams	Beth Chapel; Cheetah
Elysia Rotaru	Black Canary / Dinah Drake of Earth-2; Black Canary / Dinah Laurel Lance of Earth-2
Katee Sackhoff	Poison Ivy / Pamela Isley
Jason Spisak	Razer; Hayseed
Corey Stoll	Lex Luthor of Earth-10
Armen Taylor	Flash of Earth-2 / Jay Garrick
Dean Winters	Captain William Storm

=== Cameos ===
Appearing in all three parts without dialogue are:

- Atom, Batwing, Black Lightning, Blackhawk, Blue Devil, Booster Gold, the Challengers of the Unknown, Creeper, Elongated Man, Firestorm, Guy Gardner, Hawk and Dove, Katana, Mento, the Metal Men, Metamorpho, Negative Woman, Nighthawk, Red Star, Red Tornado, Speedy, Star Sapphire, Swamp Thing, Tempest, Starfire, Tomahawk, and Zatanna from Earth-1.
- Members of the Justice Society of America (Doctor Mid-Nite, Starfire, Hourman, Jade, Obsidian, Starman, and Wildcat) from Earth-2.
- Peacemaker from Earth-4.
- Captain Marvel Jr., Mary Marvel, and Uncle Marvel from Earth-S.
- Uncle Sam, Doll Man, Ray, and Black Condor from Earth-X.
- Thunderer from Earth-7.
- Aqualad of Earth-146.

== Production ==
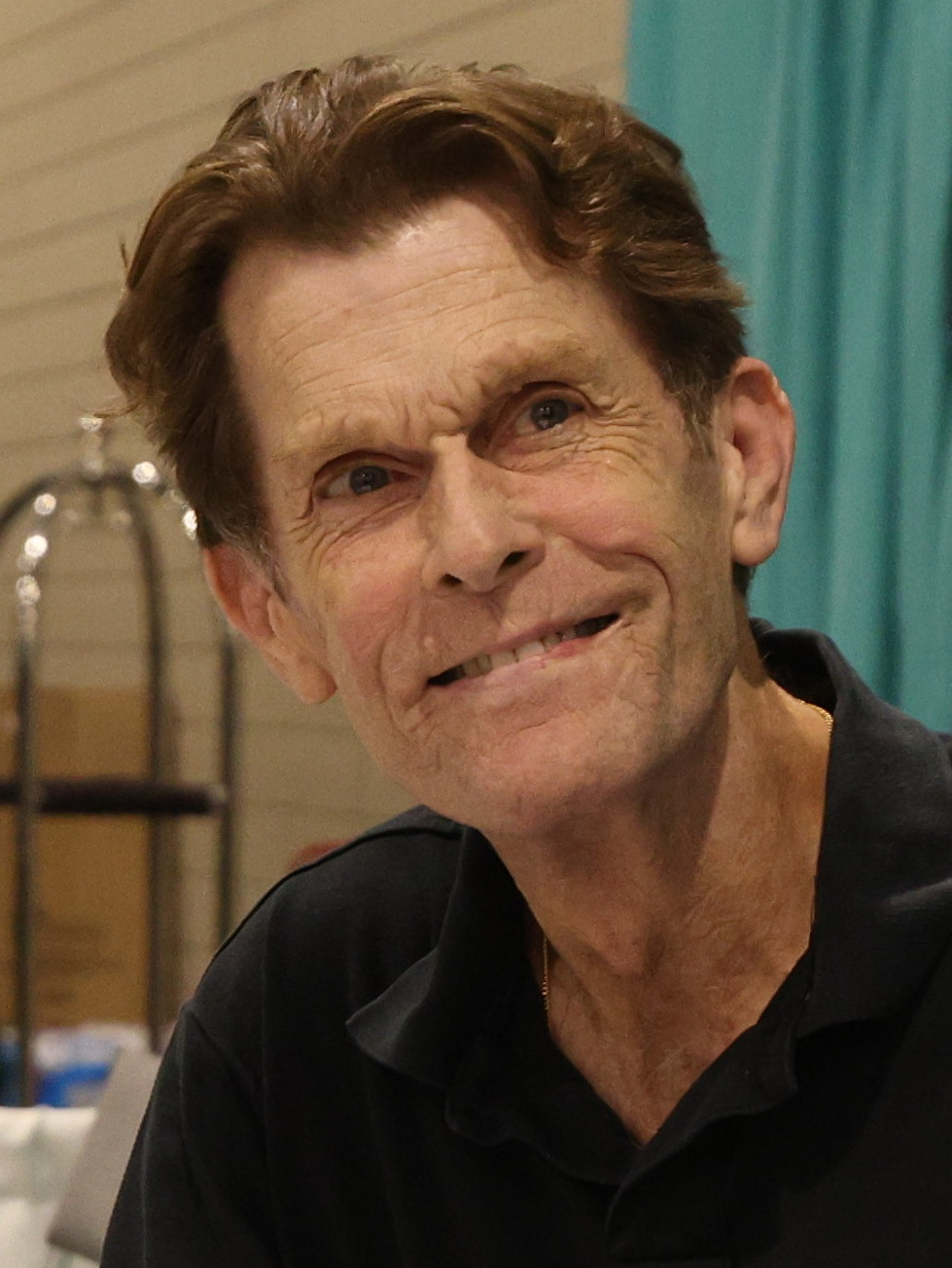
Conroy in 2021

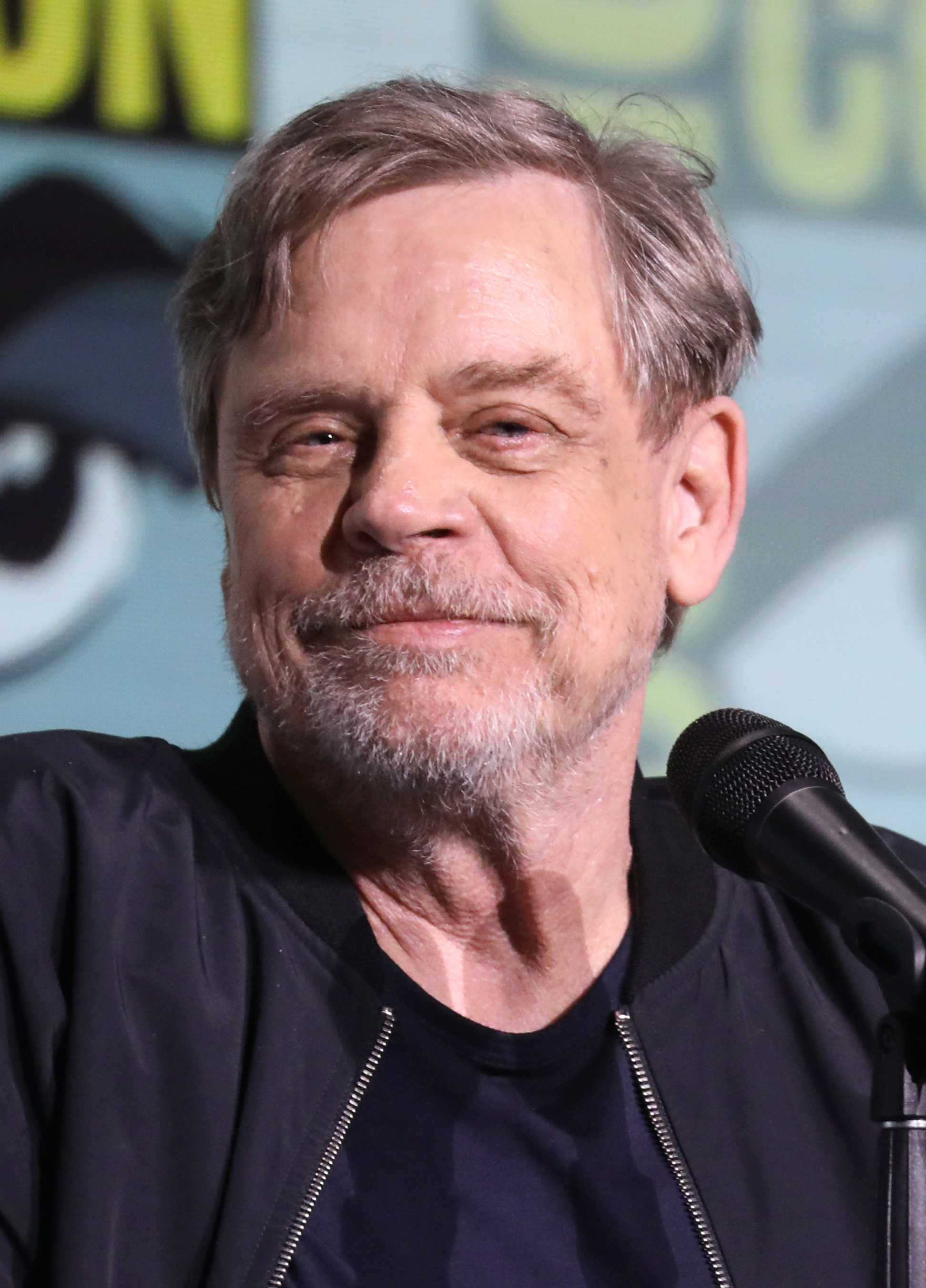
Hamill in 2024

The Crisis on Infinite Earths animated trilogy featured the final posthumous credit of Kevin Conroy as the voice of Batman, following his death in November 2022. Likewise, it was also the final time Mark Hamill officially voiced the Joker after choosing not to continue without Conroy.

An animated film trilogy based on the storyline Crisis on Infinite Earths (1985–1986) by Marv Wolfman and George Pérez was revealed to be in development since July 2023. The film concludes the DC Animated Movie Universe, which began in 2013. The voice cast and the trailer were revealed that December.

=== Casting ===
Part Three posthumously features Kevin Conroy as the DC Animated Universe version of Batman who debuted in Batman: The Animated Series, having completed his voice work before he died in 2022. Will Friedle reprised his role as Terry McGinnis from Batman Beyond in Part Two. Mark Hamill reprised his role as the Joker from Batman: The Animated Series after previously announcing his retirement from voicing the character following Conroy's death.

Jason Spisak also reprised his role as Razer from Green Lantern: The Animated Series and Young Justice, while Jennifer Hale voices Aya, replacing Grey DeLisle.

=== Release ===
Released in three parts in 2024, Part One was released on digital in the U.S. and Canada on January 9, and on Ultra HD Blu-ray and Blu-ray on January 23. Part Two and Part Three were made available for online streaming on April 23 and July 16, respectively. All 3 films on Ultra HD Blu-ray are in native 4K resolution. Both were dedicated to Kevin Conroy and George Perez.

== Reception ==
=== Reviews ===
Rotten Tomatoes
Film	Reviews	Ref.
Justice League: Crisis on Infinite Earths – Part One	78%	
Justice League: Crisis on Infinite Earths – Part Two	14%	
Justice League: Crisis on Infinite Earths – Part Three	20%	

=== Critical response ===
Rafael Motamayor, writing for Inverse, praised the film, saying that "Justice League: Crisis on Infinite Earths – Part One finally gets the DC crossover event right", and called it "a worthy adaptation focusing on heart and character". Mae Abdulbaki, in a review for Screen Rant, also gave the film a positive review, praising its faithfulness to the source material.

Hayden Mears of IGN rated the film a 7 out of 10, with the verdict: "Justice League: Crisis on Infinite Earths – Part One knows what it is and strives to do right by its source material. There's no depth, no moral murk, no optional profundity for the insight-hungry. Just good, clean, marginally sensical fun. The action and performances are nothing to shake a Batarang at, but it never loses sight of its stakes and (mostly) prioritizes character over plot". Jennifer Borget of Common Sense Media gave it three out of five stars, praising its story but criticizing the scenes of constant jumping between alternate Earths in the film, and feeling that the action scenes were borrowed from other superhero tales.

== See also ==
- Justice League: Crisis on Two Earths (2010)
- "Crisis on Infinite Earths" (Arrowverse)
