= Owlman (character) =

DC comics supervillain

- The pre-Crisis version of Owlman as depicted in Convergence: Crime Syndicate #1 (April 2015). Art by Phil Winslade (pencils and inks) and Lovern Kindzierski (colors).

Publication information
- Publisher: DC Comics
- First appearance: As Owlman: Justice League of America #29 (August 1964); As Thomas Wayne Jr.: World's Finest #223 (June 1974); As Owlman (Thomas Wayne Jr.): JLA: Earth 2 #1 (January 2000)
- Created by: As Owlman: Gardner Fox (writer); Mike Sekowsky (artist); As Thomas Wayne Jr.: Bob Haney (writer); Dick Dillin (artist); As Owlman (Thomas Wayne Jr.): Grant Morrison (writer); Frank Quitely (artist)

In-story information
- Alter ego: Thomas Wayne II; Thomas Alan Wayne Jr. Lincoln March Roy Raymond Jr.
- Species: Human
- Place of origin: Earth-Three
- Team affiliations: Crime Syndicate of America; Crime Society of America; Outsiders
- Partnerships: Talon
- Abilities: (Pre-Crisis); Ability to cause confusion; Expert boomerang killer; (Post-Crisis); Chemically enhanced "super-cortex"; All versions; Master martial artist and hand-to-hand combatant; Genius-level intellect; Peak human physical and mental conditioning; Utilizes advanced technology

Owlman (Thomas Wayne, Jr.) is a fictional character appearing in American comic book published by DC Comics. A supervillainous alternate-universe counterpart of Batman, he is depicted as the adult version of Wayne's deceased older brother, who in other universes dies as a child, before Bruce is born. In The New 52, the primary continuity Owlman, originally depicted as the asylum-bound Boomerang Killer, is retroactively revealed to be still alive, stolen from his parents as a child, and working in the service of the Court of Owls under the name Lincoln March.

Owlman is voiced by Diedrich Bader and James Woods in the 2008 animated series Batman: The Brave and the Bold and the 2010 animated feature film Justice League: Crisis on Two Earths respectively. Damon Dayoub portrays Lincoln March in the 2023 television series Gotham Knights.

== Publication history ==
Owlman first appeared in Justice League of America #29 (August 1964), and was created by Gardner Fox and Mike Sekowsky. Thomas Wayne Jr. / The Boomerang Killer first appeared in World's Finest #223 (June 1974), and was created by Bob Haney and Dick Dillin. In JLA: Earth 2 #1 (January 2000), created by Grant Morrison and Frank Quitely, the two are retroactively established to be the same character.

== Fictional character biography ==
=== Earth-Three ===
Originally, Owlman was a super-intelligent supervillain whose real name was never given. He was created as an evil counterpart to Batman. He is a member of the criminal organization known as the Crime Syndicate of America, who originated and operated on the reverse Earth-Three. In some of the pre-Crisis Crime Syndicate appearances, the Earth-Three Owlman also had the ability to briefly control minds, though it is unclear how he acquired this ability. When he was knocked out, his sub-conscious mind was able to remain active enough for him to say a word enabling him to travel to Earth-Three. He was also able to see in the dark. In the Syndicate's first travel between Earths, they met the JLA and JSA, but were defeated and imprisoned between Earth-1 and Earth-2 by Green Lantern. Later the time travelling villain Per Degaton released them as part of his plan to take over Earth-2 by stealing nuclear missiles from the Cuban Missile Crisis of Earth-Prime. When the Syndicate betrayed him, they were sent to 1982 as he had made sure this would happen when they touched him. When he was defeated, these events were erased from existence.

The pre-Crisis Earth-Three Owlman and the Crime Syndicate are killed by the Anti-Monitor's antimatter wave during the storyline Crisis on Infinite Earths. The group appears during the storyline Convergence, in which Brainiac collects destroyed timelines and universes in domes.

=== JLA: Earth 2 ===
The Thomas Wayne Jr. version of Owlman as depicted in JLA: Earth 2, art by Frank Quitely.

The Owlman character was revived (along with his teammates) in the late 1990s for modern DC continuity in the graphic novel JLA: Earth 2. This Owlman was developed to be reflective of the modern readers with a far darker attitude and background than either of the two Earth-Three depictions. On antimatter Earth, Owlman was now Thomas Wayne Jr., the older brother of that reality's Bruce Wayne. In most mainstream DC universes, Batman's genesis occurred when young Bruce Wayne was witness to the murder of his parents, and was inspired to devote his life to fighting crime.

In the antimatter universe, Bruce was killed along with his mother, while his brother and father survived, with Thomas Jr. growing up to be Owlman. Equipping himself with a utility belt containing technology and weapons similar to those used by Batman along with possessing a drug-enhanced high intellect (devoted to crime rather than serving the law), Owlman became a master criminal and an ally to Boss Gordon (the antimatter Earth's version of James Gordon) and underboss Lucius Fox. Later, he learned that his father Thomas Wayne Sr. was still alive and had become the chief of police in their world's version of Gotham City, gathering a cadre of police officers who did not give in to the rampant corruption which infested their version of Earth. Thomas Jr. blames his father for the deaths of his mother and brother and it is implied that the main purpose to his criminal career is to punish his father, who is well aware of who he is and is equally determined to destroy his own son. During his visit to the "main" DC Universe upon discovering the Waynes' graves, he states that nothing matters because "he's dead", and that there is no one left to hurt, referring to Thomas Wayne Sr. and collapses to his knees in despair in front of his father’s grave.

While antimatter Clark Kent (as Ultraman) is the leader of the Syndicate, Thomas Jr. (as Owlman) is the real brains behind the group. The working relationship between the two is extremely tense, due to Ultraman's desire to rule the planet through fear and violence clashing with Owlman's more pragmatic desire to allow dissent and rebellion to run rampant (going so far as to funding opposition towards the Syndicate) to provide himself and his allies in the Syndicates enemies to fight. Further complicating things is the fact that Thomas Jr. has carried on a longtime affair with Ultraman's wife Superwoman. Ultraman is aware of the affair, but due to Thomas Jr. having undisclosed photographic blackmail material against the villain, he is unable to seek retribution against Owlman for the betrayal. Though Ultraman does fire warning beams in between them if he catches them romancing each other when he is around.

In JLA: Earth 2, the antimatter Alexander Luthor, a heroic version of Lex Luthor, makes a reference to Owlman's "drug-enhanced" cerebral cortex, although this version of Owlman does not demonstrate any superhuman powers. Presumably, Thomas Jr. merely uses some sort of drug to enhance his mental capacity though it is not specifically stated how powerful his mental powers are or how they are enhanced through such artificial means. Thomas Jr. and his antimatter Crime Syndicate allies appeared in the weekly Trinity series, starting with issue #9. The "Weaponers of Qward" had attacked their Earth, killing millions and tearing apart the landscape. The Syndicate had kidnapped hundreds of innocent people from all 52 realities, including what appeared to be Jimmy Olsen, but was later revealed to be his anti-matter duplicate. It is unclear if Thomas Jr. allows the JLA to win to get the heroes off his source Earth and counterattack after they depart, or if he was actually defeated.

=== The New 52 ===
In 2011, "The New 52" rebooted the DC universe. There are two different characters in this continuity that took up the name of Owlman:

==== Earth 3 (Forever Evil) ====
In the continuity following DC's 2011 reboot, Owlman is one of the members of the Crime Syndicate to arrive from Earth-3 at the conclusion of the "Trinity War" event. He is a crime lord on Earth-3 and became Owlman after his butler Alfred Pennyworth (who was later responsible for forming the Secret Society of Super Villains) murdered his family. He is shown to have disdain for his parents due to his mother's abusive nature and his cowardly father killing his patients as a surgical fetish showing no remorse. Alfred also caused the death of his brother Bruce. Unlike him, Bruce loved their parents. He would later try to replace Bruce with a young acrobat Dick Grayson, whose parents he got murdered, to later make him his partner Talon. Talon was later murdered by Earth-3's version of Joker. During the Forever Evil storyline, where he travels to Earth Prime, he claims control of all crime in Gotham and joins the rest of the Crime Syndicate in the fight against Batman and his allies. Owlman later accompanies Superwoman to Arkham Asylum where they spring its inmates and capture Nightwing. In the final battle against the Crime Syndicate, Owlman joins the Crime Syndicate into fighting the Justice League and Lex Luthor's team. In the aftermath of the battle, Owlman is mentioned to still be at large. He reappears at LexCorp after the events of Forever Evil. A deal takes place between him and Lex Luthor, which involves Luthor providing him with Superwoman's child in return for Owlman's help in defeating the Anti-Monitor.

After Ultraman and Superwoman are killed in battle during the Darkseid War storyline, Owlman flees using the Mobius chair and ends up on the moon, where Metron trains him. When Owlman accesses the secrets of the universe, he is vaporized by an unknown entity. Owlman and the rest of the Syndicate were resurrected on Earth-3 during the events of Dark Nights: Metal, with no memories of the events of Forever Evil. They joined the forces of Perpetua along with other evil alternate Justice Leagues the New Reichsmen, Unjustice League of Unamerica, Blood League and Justice Lords to remake the multiverse in her image, using Earth-3 and its population as a giant amplifier to channel energy from the Dark Multiverse into Perpetua. However, Owlman was sceptical of Perpetua's motivations, and was also jealous of The Batman Who Laughs, as he believed himself to be the true dark reflection of Batman. While the Syndicate battled a team of heroes from various worlds in the multiverse, Owlman talked with John Stewart, who revealed that there had been multiple Owlmen before him. Owlman was overjoyed at this, as every version of the multiverse had its own Owlman, he believed that he would always survive in some form as long as the multiverse existed. He killed Ultraman and Superwoman to let the heroes escape, then blew up his own world, declaring that he was immortal.

==== Prime Earth ====
On Prime Earth, a man who claims himself to be Thomas Wayne Jr. first appears in Batman (vol. 2) He claims he was Bruce's younger brother, born prematurely as the result of an attempt on Martha Wayne's life by the Court of Owls. He survived and was sent to be cared for in the Willowwood Home for Children. Shortly thereafter, the Waynes were murdered, and he claims to have been left in Willowwood. Without the Waynes' funding, the home deteriorated from the premier children's hospital in the area to a mental institution where sick children were abused by the staff; he claims to have endured this treatment until he was taken in by the Court of Owls and raised as their pawn. Though he claims that the Court was previously setting him up to succeed the Wayne family's legacy, Bruce Wayne's sudden reappearance and return to Gotham resulted in the Court to bestow him the identity of Lincoln March. March would grow to become one of the top members of the Court in the following years.

In his false identity as a mayoral candidate, March was present at the first attempt on Bruce Wayne's life by one of the Court's Talon assassins. The Court told him he could watch Bruce's assassination, though he and the Court did not know that Bruce was Batman at the time. March assassinated several members of the Court by poisoning, not before orchestrating his own murder. It is revealed that he survived by taking a dose of the regenerative compound which the Court of Owls used to resurrect their Talons, and had decided to lure Batman to the abandoned building of Willowwood for a final confrontation. Before engaging Batman in a fight, he equipped himself with a powered suit of armor; in which it was originally intended as a modern suit for Talons to combat the "new threat" that Batman posed, until it was abandoned in favor of strengthening the Talons with their regenerative compound. After a lengthy brawl, he was ultimately caught in an explosion meant for Batman, although no body was found in the wreckage.

Bruce later found evidence that he indeed had a brother who was born prematurely as a result of a car accident at the intersection of Lincoln and March, but according to all records Bruce could find that brother had only lived for twelve hours. Bruce had also discovered that weeks later, an orphan child had been admitted in Willowwood with characteristics similar to his deceased brother but who Bruce believes was raised to believe he was Thomas Jr., though without the body or DNA to analyze, he could not confirm its truth. Nevertheless, Bruce confided in Dick Grayson his belief that his parents would have told him if he had a brother, and that the circumstantial evidence he discovered could easily have been used by the Court to convince March of the authenticity of his "true" identity.

At the conclusion of Batman Eternal when Cluemaster unmasks himself as the person responsible for the recent systematic attacks on Batman and his family, he is about to shoot Bruce in the head when March walks up behind him and slits his throat, revealing that he funded Cluemaster's actions using the resources of the apparently-deceased Court of Owls with the intention of stepping in and killing Bruce, intending to leave his body out in public while March retreats into the shadows, reasoning that Bruce's death at the hands of an unknown foe would forever end the 'myth' of Batman. Despite being battered and exhausted from the long assault, Bruce assembles a makeshift costume from rags and stands against March in downtown Gotham just as Jim Gordon rallies the people of Gotham to stand up and take back their city by fighting in Batman's name. Finding himself faced with the entire Bat-family, March is forced to retreat, but is caught by the surviving members of the Court and put into suspended animation, the Court musing that they may let him out again in a decade if they decide they need him.

Before the events of Robin War, March is reanimated by the Court of Owls. March reveals he has a plan to obtain the Gray Son and has the Court of Owls bring forth the events of Robin War to accomplish his plan. Initially, he blackmails Damian Wayne in becoming the Court's new Gray Son, but he reveals to Dick Grayson that it was all a ruse to get Grayson to March and make him the Gray Son. Revealing that an explosive device has been placed within Damian as leverage, Dick has no choice but to join the Court of Owls, and publicly announces to the newly expanded, international Parliament of Owls that he is not Robin. Having successfully obtained the Gray Son, March addressed the Parliament of Owls as they decided to cast aside their connection to Gotham's Court of Owls and discard their white masks and replace them with black ones. While preaching about his new role in the Parliament, March is killed by Raptor, one of the Parliament's assassins, who reveals that both he and the Parliament have decided that March's own desires have become too much of a hindrance.

In the storyline "The Joker War", the Joker resurrects March using a serum that he took from the Court of Owls.

=== Infinite Frontier ===
Following the reboot of the multiverse after Dark Nights: Death Metal, a new Earth-3 and Owlman are created. When Thomas Wayne Jr. was a child, his parents and brother Bruce were killed by Harvey Bullock. He spent years training to bring justice to his family's killers, swearing to follow a code against killing or using the tactics of criminals. He was inspired to take the name Owlman when an owl clawed his face. In 2012 he captured Bullock, intending to hand him over to the police to serve a life sentence in prison. Bullock recognises Owlman as Thomas Wayne Jr. and tries to bargain for his life by revealing that his parents were criminals who worked for Boss Gordon and tried to usurp his empire, killing his son in the process. Bullock was ordered to kill the Waynes in retribution. After learning the truth, Owlman became nihilistic and renounced his code, dropping Bullock from the top of Wayne Tower to his death.

Owlman ensures his existence is a mere unconfirmed rumour, murdering anyone who takes a picture of him. He is the leader of a murderous vigilante group known as the Talons who hunt criminals in Gotham City, assisted by his gun-toting butler Alfred. Owlman is suicidal but does not wish to kill himself, he therefore seeks out dangerous opponents who may be able to kill him. Despite his desire to die he fights to the best of his abilities and studies his enemies to determine their weaknesses. When the Starro Collective invaded Earth, Owlman devised a strategy to defeat them and revealed himself to the world. His strategy failed although Superwoman would defeat the Starros by murdering their queen. Following the Starro invasion, Alexander Luthor begins recruiting metahumans into a Legion of Justice. Owlman, Superwoman and Ultraman form an alliance to counter him. To further limit Luthor's ability to act against them, Thomas Wayne Jr. sues LexCorp through Wayne Enterprises subsidiaries to drive down their stock price, then purchases a large number of shares in the company and joins its board of directors.

== Alternative versions ==
=== Dick Grayson ===
An unrelated prior use of the Owlman name occurs in Batman #107, "The Grown-Up Boy Wonder!" (April 1957). After temporarily being transformed into an adult, Dick Grayson dons an owl costume and becomes the Owlman.

=== Qwardian Owlman ===
A Qward weaponer, wearing the same costume as the dead pre-Crisis Earth-Three Owlman, appeared as a member of a Qward Crime Syndicate.

=== 52 ===
An alternate universe version of Owlman from a new Earth-3, based on the pre-Crisis Earth-Three incarnation, appears in 52 Week 52. This version is a member of the Crime Society who is aided by a young sidekick called Talon and opposed by the Jokester.

=== Roy Raymond Jr. ===
Roy Raymond Jr. assumed the mantle of Owlman and utilized Batman's equipment to assist the Outsiders.

== In other media ==
=== Television ===
- Owlman appears in the Batman: The Brave and the Bold consecutive episodes "Deep Cover for Batman!" and "Game Over for Owlman!", voiced by Diedrich Bader. This version is the leader of the Injustice Syndicate.
- Lincoln March appears in Gotham Knights, portrayed by Damon Dayoub. This version is an industrialist and acting leader of the Court of Owls who is married to the Court's true leader Rebecca (portrayed by Lauren Stamile) and has a son named Brody March (portrayed by Rahart Adams). He later becomes Gotham's mayor, but is poisoned by Rebecca for his repeated failures while leading the Court.
- In Pennyworth Thomas Wayne and Martha Kane have a first child named Samantha Thomas Wayne, a female version of Thomas Wayne Jr.

=== Film ===
Owlman as seen in Justice League: Crisis on Two Earths.

- Owlman appears in Justice League: Crisis on Two Earths, voiced by James Woods. This version is a nihilistic and calculating strategist and martial artist who is in a relationship with Superwoman and possesses an exoskeleton in his suit that grants a degree of superhuman strength and durability. After discovering the multiverse, he becomes obsessed with the idea that nothing matters as, no matter what decision a person makes, an alternate version of them will make the opposite choice. In light of this development, he repurposes one of the Crime Syndicate's super-weapons and searches for Earth Prime to destroy the multiverse, believing that it would be the only choice that would matter. He nearly succeeds, but is defeated by Batman, sent to a frozen Earth, and chooses to die in the explosion of his weapon.
- Owlman appears in Justice League: Crisis on Infinite Earths, voiced by Lou Diamond Phillips.

=== Video games ===
- Owlman appears in DC Universe Online as part of the Earth-3 DLC.
- Owlman appears as a character summon in Scribblenauts Unmasked: A DC Comics Adventure.
- Owlman appears in Lego DC Super-Villains, voiced by Jason Marsden.

=== Miscellaneous ===
- Owlman was intended to appear in The Batman Strikes! before its cancellation.
- Owlman appears in The Flash: Crossover Crisis novels by Barry Lyga.
