= Earth Prime =

Term used in works of speculative fiction

Earth Prime (or Earth-Prime) is a term sometimes used in works of speculative fiction, most notably in DC Comics, involving parallel universes or a multiverse, and refers either to the universe containing "our" Earth, or to a parallel world with a bare minimum of divergence points from Earth as we know it — often the absence or near-absence of metahumans, or with their existence confined to fictional narratives like comics. The "Earth Prime" of a given fictional setting may or may not have an intrinsic value to or vital connection to the other Earths it exists alongside (although it appears to be the case that such Prime Earths — and sometimes the 'central universes' in which those Prime Earths exist as well — are portrayed in fiction to be vital to the existence of the other Earths).

== DC Comics ==
Earth Prime
- First appearance: The Flash #179 (May 1968)
- Characters: Superboy-Prime; Legion of Super-Heroes (2004 team); Ultraa
- Publisher: DC Comics

In the DC Multiverse Earth-Prime is the true Earth from which all the other worlds within the Multiverse originate, the "actual" reality where the readers of DC Comics live (and where DC Comics operates as a publisher), and is an Earth where all superheroes are fictional. Earth-Prime does, however, become an alternate reality in its first appearance in The Flash #179 (May 1968), when the Flash accidentally travels there from Earth-One by being pushed by a creature called The Nok. The Flash, stranded, contacts then-DC Comics editor Julius Schwartz, who helps him construct a cosmic treadmill to return to Earth-One. Eventually, it was stated that the writers of DC Comics of Earth Prime subconsciously base their stories on the adventures of the heroes on Earth-One and Earth-Two.

In The Flash #228 (July/Aug 1974), Earth-Prime's Cary Bates travels to Earth-One, where he discovers that the stories he writes are not only based on events on Earth-One, but can actually influence these events as well. This power turns for the worse in Justice League of America #123 (October 1975), when Bates is accidentally transported to Earth-Two. The interdimensional trip temporarily turns Bates into a supervillain, and he kills the Justice Society of America. Fellow writer Elliot S. Maggin, with the help of the Justice League and the Spectre, restores matters on both Earths in Justice League of America #124 (November 1975).

=== Ultraa ===
The first superhero of Earth-Prime is Ultraa, introduced in Justice League of America #153. Like Superman, Ultraa was the sole survivor of a destroyed alien world, rocketed to Earth-Prime as a baby. After his first encounter with the Justice League, Ultraa decided Earth-Prime was not ready for superheroes and relocated to Earth-One. Post-Crisis on Infinite Earths in 1985, when there was no longer an Earth-Prime or greater Multiverse, Ultraa was retconned into being from the planet Almerac, homeworld of Maxima.

=== Superboy-Prime ===
The second superhero (later turned super-villain) of this Earth is Superboy-Prime, revealed as the true Superman from which all the other Supermen originate. He first appeared in DC Comics Presents #87 (Nov. 1985). This Superboy's powers first manifested around the time of the passage of Halley's Comet in 1985. Just after manifesting his powers, Superboy-Prime met Earth-One's Superman. Soon after, Earth-Prime was destroyed in Crisis on Infinite Earths #10. Superboy-Prime escaped his universe's destruction and later joined Earth-Two's Superman and Lois Lane and Earth-Three's Alexander Luthor in traveling to another dimension.

In Infinite Crisis, a now anti-heroic Superboy-Prime convinced Luthor that Earth-Prime was the ideal world and urged him to draw his inspiration for making a new Earth from Earth-Prime. Luthor began searching through the myriad Earths for Earth-Prime and, in a metatextual nod to Earth Prime's original status as the keystone Earth, looks directly at the readers and reaches out towards them to grab our reality.

In 2004, DC revisited the Earth-Prime concept in the miniseries Superman: Secret Identity. Writer Kurt Busiek states in the introduction to the collected volume of the series that the original appearance of Superboy-Prime was the inspiration for his graphic novel.

=== Legion of Super-Heroes ===
The 2008 Final Crisis tie-in series Legion of Three Worlds makes various references to Earth-Prime during a time that Superboy-Prime is still looking to make his "Perfect Earth". He starts by rebuilding the Legion of Super-Villains to fight Superman and the three versions of the Legion of Super-Heroes. During the battle, Element Lad creates Kryptonite that unexpectedly affected Superboy-Prime; the Kryptonite of New Earth had previously had no effect on Superman (Kal-L) and or Superboy-Prime during Infinite Crisis.

At the end of the miniseries, it is revealed that Earth-Prime has been reborn and that Superboy-Prime was returned there. It was also revealed that the Threeboot Legion are from Earth-Prime's future.

=== The Multiversity: Ultra Comics and Earth-33 ===
In September 2011, The New 52 rebooted DC's continuity. In this new multiverse, Earth-33 is introduced in Grant Morrison's The Multiversity series as the additional designation for Earth-Prime. This Earth continues the tradition of having minimal superhero activity – in this case, the minds of Earth-33's comic book readers have empowered a superhero named Ultraa, who is the only metahuman on Earth-33, fighting the encroachment of the "Gentry" (the series' lead villains) by confining their presence on "our" world to the pages of an 'entrapment comic book' built around the title character.

== Marvel Comics ==
In the fictional Marvel Universe, the 'Earth Prime' of that setting is designated by extradimensional cartographers as Earth-1218, where real-life readers buy Marvel Comics. On some occasions, various characters of the Marvel Universe, looking for their version of God, encounter 'real world' figures such as Jack Kirby and Stan Lee. Other characters (such as She-Hulk and Deadpool) are capable of breaking the fourth wall, addressing the readers directly. Still others, such as the Earth's Watcher, Uatu, possess the ability to see all alternate Earths in the Marvel Universe setting at will, including the real one in which they and all other beings are fictional characters. Having a similar name, "Prime Earth" became an alternate designation of "Earth-616" in the wake of Jonathan Hickman's Secret Wars event.

== Sliders ==
Earth Prime, as used in the television show Sliders, is the name of the alternate Earth where the four original sliders (Quinn Mallory, Wade Welles, Rembrandt Brown, and Maximillian Arturo) started their journey. This Earth was the same as ours until 1997 or 1998, when the Kromaggs slid onto Earth Prime and conquered it.

== The Dark Tower ==
Much of the action in the last few books of Stephen King's Dark Tower series takes place in "the keystone world", essentially the Earth Prime concept under a different name, complete with appearances by King himself as a character.

== The Chronicles of Amber ==
Though not using the term "Earth Prime", Roger Zelazny's The Chronicles of Amber fantasy series features a similar concept. In the Amber stories, Amber is the only true world; all others, including our Earth, are but "shadows" of the tension between it and Chaos.

== Teenage Mutant Ninja Turtles ==
In the Teenage Mutant Ninja Turtles made-for-TV film, Turtles Forever, Ch'rell (or 2003 series's version of The Shredder) took the technodrome from his 1987 series counterpart and Krang and upgraded it with Utrom technology. He later decided to destroy Turtle-Prime to destroy the multiverse. He was stopped by the three teams of turtles from the Prime, 1987, and 2003 universes. The true "Earth Prime" of the film would be that inhabited by Kevin Eastman and Peter Laird in the closing shot, shown putting the finishing touches on the first issue of the Teenage Mutant Ninja Turtles comic book.

== In other media ==
=== DC Entertainment ===
- In the DC animated feature Justice League: Crisis on Two Earths, the villainous Owlman's ultimate goal is to locate a universe that he designates as Earth Prime, the so-called "original" universe that all other universes stem from, and destroy it, thus leading to the destruction of all reality as well, due to believing that the existence of a multiverse meant nothing truly matters. Earth Prime is shown to be a desolate barren wasteland of a planet which has been ripped out of orbit, with ruins as far as the eye can see. It is unknown what exactly caused its desolation, though Owlman reasons that mankind was destroyed by itself.
- In the Arrowverse crossover "Crisis on Infinite Earths: Part Four", after the Anti-Monitor destroyed the original multiverse, The Spectre and the seven Paragons (Supergirl, The Flash, Lex Luthor, Batwoman, Ryan Choi, Sara Lance, and J'onn J'onzz) merged elements from Earth-1 (Arrow, The Flash, Legends of Tomorrow, and Batwoman) with Earth-38 (Supergirl) and the unnamed Black Lightning Earth to create a composite universe known as Earth-Prime that is unknown to those from Earth-Prime, as part of a new multiverse. Only the Paragons themselves, as well as their allies and families, are aware of the previous reality.

=== Marvel Entertainment ===
In the final episode of Spider-Man: The Animated Series, after saving the multiverse from Spider-Carnage, an evil version of himself from an alternate Earth, Spider-Man briefly visits Earth Prime and meets his own creator, Stan Lee.
