= Superman: Doomed =

American comic

- Cover of Superman: Doomed #1 (May 2014), art by Ken Lashley and Eduardo Risso.
- Publisher: DC Comics
- Publication date: May 2014
- Genre: Superhero
Title(s)
Superman: Doomed #1-2
Action Comics (vol. 2) #30-35
Action Comics Annual (vol. 2) #3
Batman/Superman #11
Superman/Wonder Woman #7-12
Superman/Wonder Woman Annual #1
Supergirl (vol. 6) #34-35
Superman (vol. 3) #30-31
- Main character(s): Superman, Doomsday

Creative team
- Writer(s): Greg Pak, Charles Soule, Scott Lobdell, Tony Bedard
- Artist(s): Ken Lashley, Aaron Kuder, Tony Daniel, Jack Herbert, Emanuela Lupacchino

"Superman: Doomed" is a Superman crossover story arc published by DC Comics starting in May 2014. The series is co-written by Greg Pak, Charles Soule and Scott Lobdell, with artwork by Ken Lashley, Aaron Kuder, and Tony Daniel.

The story features a confrontation between Superman and Doomsday, but it is not meant to be a retelling of "The Death of Superman". Instead, it further explores Superman's universe and personal connections in The New 52.

Starting with the Superman: Doomed #1 one-shot, the story arc is told in Action Comics, Superman/Wonder Woman, Batman/Superman, and Superman. The Superman book is only involved in the story arc for issue #31, which also marked the end of Scott Lobdell's run in the title.

== Premise ==
Doomsday has emerged from the Phantom Zone, wreaking havoc across the world. Superman kills the beast but is infected with a virus present in its blood. This causes Superman to mutate into a Doomsday-like creature.

== Publication history ==
The story arc had been teased in Superman publications in April 2014. Doomsday's appearance had been teased in Batman/Superman #3.1, which was released during Villains Month. The Superman line of books also had been developing several plot threads involving Superman's supporting characters: Action Comics (#26-30) focused on Lana Lang and Superman's connection with Smallville; Superman/Wonder Woman (#7) focused on Superman's relationship with Wonder Woman and their battle with General Zod and Faora. Superman (#24-30) and Superman Annual #2 focused on Lois Lane, who was brainwashed into becoming a servant of Brainiac. According to the creative team, all these stories would have an impact in Superman: Doomed.

== Plot ==
Superman has received news that Doomsday has destroyed an island and disappeared without a trace. According to Superman's scientific ally, Dr. Shay Veritas, Doomsday can enter and exit the Phantom Zone at will. Doomsday's blood now contains a virus that incinerates anything within a hundred yards, which means Superman is the only one who can survive a direct confrontation with it. In a Justice League meeting in how to confront Doomsday, Lex Luthor informs them Doomsday is absorbing the life-force of his victims in order to become powerful enough to defeat Superman. Luthor suggests Superman should leave Earth and hopefully Doomsday will leave Earth as well. Superman agrees, but not before giving Batman a key to the Fortress of Solitude. Superman confronts Doomsday in outer space. The battle ends in Smallville, where Superman rips Doomsday in half. To prevent Doomsday's toxin from spreading across the world, Superman inhales it all from Doomsday's corpse and falls unconscious.

The Justice League arrives to assist Superman but he flies off and goes to sleep in a forest in Alaska alongside Krypto. As soon as he awakens, Superman watches a group of hunters kill a wolf. In a fit of rage, Superman knocks the hunters unconscious. He later attempts to enter the Fortress of Solitude but its security systems no longer recognize his DNA. After seeing grey spikes grow on his knuckles, Clark returns to Metropolis. Meanwhile, Steel (John Henry Irons) meets with Sam Lane, who has become a U.S. Senator. Both discuss Superman's current condition and the possibility of bringing him to the S.T.E.E.L. facility, a complex meant to hold dangerous criminals.

Later at his apartment, Clark slowly undergoes a mutation that transforms him into a Doomsday-like creature, with grey rock-like skin and red eyes. Wonder Woman and Batman talk about Superman's condition and realize the mutation can be controlled through sheer force of will. Diana visits Clark to make sure he is alright, but Clark becomes aggressive towards her, as the virus is beginning to affect his mind. Diana urges Clark to fight the virus' influence and informs him about Batman finding that Clark can keep the virus' effects in check using his willpower. Clark returns to normal but laments the fact his inner beast is still waiting to get out.

As Superman turns himself in to the authorities; Batman, Wonder Woman, Steel, and Krypto travel to the Phantom Zone to find out who or what released Doomsday and find a cure. There, they come across Xa-Du, the Zone's first prisoner, who reveals that he released Doomsday from its prison. With the help of the Ghost Soldier, the heroes capture Xa-Du with Wonder Woman's lasso and return to Earth.

Superman is held in a special facility where the Justice League works to find a cure. As his mutation worsens, Superman requests a visit from Lois Lane. Under her brainwashed state, Lois gives Superman a vision of the Teen Titans in danger. Wanting to help, Superman leaves the facility and finds the Titans, effortlessly defeating their enemy. The Titans are unnerved by Superman's condition, causing Superman to leave.

As Superman is attacked by the military, Lois and her father issue a public statement in which they declare Superman an enemy of the state. Wonder Woman and Lana Lang have a phone conversation in which Lana reveals the brains of Smallville's coma victims are sending electrical signals into outer space. Believing there is a connection between Superman's mutation and the coma victims, Wonder Woman and Lana choose to investigate. At the same time, Metallo breaks out of his cell at the S.T.E.E.L. facilities, but Lois convinces him to go after Superman. Steel meets Superman at Chile but they are attacked by Metallo and Atomic Skull, both tasked by Sam Lane to take Superman down. Steel subdues Atomic Skull while Superman realizes Metallo is equipped with Kryptonite explosives for a suicide attack. Metallo triggers the bombs, releasing a large Kryptonite cloud that covers the entire world. Although the blast kills Metallo, Superman survives, but the Kryptonite explosion has weakened his state of mind and accelerated his transformation.

While a mutated Superman causes destruction in the jungles of Brazil; Wonder Woman calls in Hessia, an Amazon healer, to help Superman keep his mutation in check. At the same time, Clark has a mental confrontation with his inner monster, dubbed "Superdoom", to retain control of his body. Hessia believes Superman is beyond saving and attempts to kill him, but Wonder Woman takes Superman to Earth's orbit, where the Kryptonite has no effect. Superman momentarily regains control and decides to leave Earth. As soon as he leaves, however, Superman is attacked by Guy Gardner, Supergirl, and Zilius Zox, members of the Red Lantern Corps. Before things can escalate, Wonder Woman stops the fighting and convinces the Red Lanterns to let Superman leave.

After two days, Superman goes to the asteroid belt and smashes asteroids to vent his anger. Then, Supergirl comes to Superman and takes him to the other side of the galaxy. There, they find an alien colony established on a moon is about to be destroyed by an alien criminal known as Hakar. Superman reluctantly confronts Hakar, while the moon's inhabitants attempt to escape. Hakar explains he has a condition that causes him to consume all sorts of energy, including that of the moon's core. He gave the colonists enough time to evacuate the moon before he lost control of his hunger and destroyed the moon. Superman, exerting enough control over his new Doomsday powers, manages to stop the moon's debris from destroying the escape fleet. Hakar attempts to make peace with Superman, but Superdoom takes control of Superman again and brutally attacks Hakar. Meanwhile, Lana and Steel travel to space in order to confront whoever unleashed the coma infection on Smallville. Suddenly, they discover the infection has spread to Metropolis. Lana calls Lois to warn her, but realizes Lois is working for the one who released the infection, as she is the only one unaffected while everyone else in Metropolis has fallen into a coma. Then, Lana and Steel are intercepted by Cyborg Superman and Brainiac's invasion fleet.

Superdoom intercepts Brainiac's ships and saves Lana and Steel. Back on Earth, Lois acquires a Brainiac-like shape and assembles an army of robots to construct a telepathic signal machine for Brainiac's arrival. Wonder Woman, having kept Metropolis safe after Superman left, attempts to reason with Lois but Lois assembles a suit of armor controlled by a psychic projection of John Corben (Metallo) to fight her. After defeating Corben, Wonder Woman destroys the machine Lois was building, forcing Lois and Corben to escape. Meanwhile, Superdoom reaches Brainiac's fleet and confronts Cyborg Superman.

After ripping Cyborg Superman's right arm off, Superdoom goes to Earth and begins fighting Brainiac's forces alongside the Justice League. Superdoom also burns the nanites inside Lois' body, freeing her from Brainiac's control, although she still retains her psychic powers. Cyborg Superman reconstructs his right arm and oversees the construction of a massive space portal in the dark side of the moon. He also destroys Steel's ship, but Steel and Lana escape. Just as Superdoom attacks Wonder Woman, Clark attempts to regain control of his body. The Justice League is able to purge all the Kryptonite from Earth's atmosphere and Superdoom transforms back into Superman. The Justice League also takes down Brainiac's army. However, the portal in the moon opens and Brainiac's mothership arrives at Earth.

Brainiac begins absorbing every mind in the planet while Superman creates a new plan: use the Phantom Zone projector to seal both Earth and Brainiac's mothership in the Phantom Zone to give the heroes enough time to defeat Brainiac. Discovering the heroes' strategy, Brainiac destroys the Justice League satellite, disabling the Phantom Zone projector, and attempts to crash his mothership into the planet. Superman and Martian Manhunter push the mothership away from the planet, but Mongul and Non escape from the Phantom Zone and prepare to attack Earth.

Although Mongul and Non have escaped from their Phantom Zone, Brainiac's invasion makes them quickly go back. Meanwhile, Superman and Martian Manhunter save Lana and Steel from the remains of the Justice League satellite and take them to the Fortress of Solitude. There, the remaining heroes realize Brainiac targeted Metropolis and Smallville before any other city on Earth as a way to get back at Superman for foiling his first invasion five years back. Superman allows Superdoom to take control of his body, apparently killing Superman; while Wonder Woman enters the Phantom Zone and attempts to convince Mongul to let the Warworld fight Brainiac.

As Superdoom breaks through Brainiac's defenses, Brainiac resurrects Superman and reveals his full plan; according to him, the combined psionic power of all the minds he has captured throughout the universe can change reality to his will. He wants that power to recreate his world, including his wife and son. Cyborg Superman attacks the Fortress of Solitude, but Supergirl defeats him. At the same time, Wonder Woman traps Mongul with her lasso and commands Warworld to attack Brainiac. Lois manages to transfer all of Brainiac's psionic power to Superman, who frees all the people Brainiac has captured and cures himself of the Doomsday virus. Then, Superman traps Brainiac and himself inside a black hole. Brainiac is left wandering across the multiverse, witnessing several past iterations of the DC Universe but then, he is snatched away to safety, it seems, by a being who appears to be the true Brainiac: an immensely powerful entity from outside the universe itself.

The black hole throws Superman into deep space and it takes him sixty days to return to Earth. As soon as he gets to Earth, Supergirl tells him that even after the world's population was restored, thousands died in the invasion, among them Lana's parents. Also, Dr. Veritas and Kandor has been trapped within the Phantom Zone and there is no way to rescue them as the projector imploded. Depressed, Clark publishes an article that argues that the world does not need Superman. Lois, who has forgotten Superman's identity, writes an article that says that Superman is still a positive influence on humanity, inspiring Clark. Meanwhile, Lana visits her parents' graves when suddenly a hand rises from a grave.

Superman reunites with Wonder Woman after she defeats Giganta in London. As they fly to Diana's apartment, they witness a large plant creature sneaking out. Superman deduces the creature is a rare plant from Krypton that he gave Wonder Woman. As the plant feeds off oil, they realize it will attempt to feed off the world's petroleum supply. Superman argues with Wonder Woman about how she was unable to feed the plant. Realizing that they are not acting normally, Wonder Woman flies to Olympus and confronts the goddess Eris, who is responsible for her argument with Superman. Eris says she is just doing her job and Wonder Woman cannot stop her. Wonder Woman replies that she can make her job harder and smashes her scrying pool. Superman tracks the plant creature to a series of oil rigs off the coast of Scotland. Not wanting to hurt the creature, Superman asks Swamp Thing for help. As he touches the creature, Swamp Thing learns how to speak Kryptonian and is able to convince the creature to return to its original form. Later, Superman and Wonder Woman apologize for their unnecessary argument and restart the relationship.

== Titles ==
- Superman: Doomed #1-2
- Action Comics #30-35
  - Action Comics Annual #3
- Superman/Wonder Woman #7-12
  - Superman/Wonder Woman Annual #1
- Batman/Superman #11
- Superman #30-31
- Supergirl #34-35

== Reading order ==
- Prelude:
  - Action Comics Vol. 2 #30
  - Superman/Wonder Woman #7
  - Superman Vol. 3 #30
- Main Event:
  - Superman: Doomed #1
  - Action Comics Vol. 2 #31 (Infected: Chapter 1)
  - Superman/Wonder Woman #8 (Infected: Chapter 2)
  - Batman/Superman #11 (Infected: Chapter 3)
  - Superman Vol. 3 #31 (Infected: Chapter 4)
  - Action Comics Vol. 2 #32 (Enemy of the State: Chapter 1)
  - Superman/Wonder Woman #9 (Enemy of the State: Chapter 2)
  - Action Comics Vol. 2 #33 (Superdoom: Chapter 1)
  - Superman/Wonder Woman #10 (Superdoom: Chapter 2)
  - Superman/Wonder Woman Annual #1 (Superdoom: Chapter 3)
  - Action Comics Annual Vol. 2 #3 (Superdoom: Chapter 4)
  - Action Comics Vol. 2 #34 (Last Sun: Chapter 1)
  - Superman/Wonder Woman #11 (Last Sun: Chapter 2)
  - Supergirl Vol. 6 #34 (Last Sun: Chapter 3)
  - Superman: Doomed #2
- Aftermath:
  - Action Comics Vol. 2 #35
  - Superman/Wonder Woman #12
  - Supergirl Vol. 6 #35 (At the Mercy of Red Hood!)

== Collected editions ==
- Superman: Doomed (collects Superman #30-31, Action Comics #31-35, Action Comics Annual #3, Superman/Wonder Woman #8-12, Superman/Wonder Woman Annual #1, Supergirl #34-35, Batman/Superman #11 and Superman: Doomed #1-2 with select pages from Action Comics #30 and Superman/Wonder Woman #7)
- Superman: Doomed Special #2 (collects Action Comics #34, Superman/Wonder Woman #11, Supergirl #34, Superman: Doomed #2).
