= Jack Herbert =

Brazilian comic book artist

- Born: February 28, 1982 (age 44); Paraíba, Brazil
- Occupations: Penciler, inker, illustrator
- Notable work: Kirby: Genesis; The Battlestar Galactica: Season Zero; Red Sonja; Queen Sonja; Miss Fury; Superman and Wonder Woman; Superman

Jack Herbert (born February 28, 1982), Jackson Herbert Santos de Sousa also known as Jackson Herbert, is a Brazilian comic book artist whose published work includes interior illustrations and cover art. He entered the industry in 2005 when he was selected by an agency to work in the U.S. market. He is known for the Kirby: Genesis series in which he has worked with the best-selling and Eisner award winners Kurt Busiek and Alex Ross and for his contributions to various Dynamite and DC Comics titles.

== Early life ==
Jack was born on February 28, 1982, in Bananeiras, Paraíba where he lived a "typical middle-class childhood". He became interested in drawing from early childhood and at age of nine, an aunt showed him an interview with Mike Deodato in the local newspaper, what caused him great impact because Deodato also lived in Paraíba and drew for the great American publishers. Jack explains, "And that's when I discovered that I could live with comics, work with comics. So it was from there that I came to believe.". At age 10, his family moved to João Pessoa where he lives until now.

In the 90's, he was first influenced by superheroes when he discovered Jim Lee's X-Men and the TV series X-Men: Animated Series. He also would later be influenced by comics artists such as Mike Deodato, Lee Bermejo, Eduardo Risso, José Luis García-López, Frank Frazetta, Esad Ribic, John Buscema, Marc Silvestri, and Olivier Coipel

At age 18, he joined the group of designers of a local studio and began doing freelance commercial art jobs and participating in local art events. In October 2000, he attended a lecture on American comics industry and have his artworks evaluated for the first time. From then on, he focused on the goal of becoming a professional comics artist.

At the suggestion of his parents, he graduated on Business Administration in 2006, but always continued with his studies on drawing and comics. In 2005, Jack was awarded as penciler at the VII Salão de Novos Artistas Plásticos and at the Wizard Brazil's National Contest. He's member of the Academy of Letters and Arts of the Northeast of Brazil (ALANE/PB) since 2014.

== Career ==
At the end of 2005, Jack submitted some drawings to Glass House Graphics and after it has passed the 3-stages-evaluation process, he was selected to work in the US market.

=== Dynamite Entertainment (2006 - 2014) ===
During the first three years of his career (2006-2008), He started doing the covers and then the interiors of the horror series Echoes of Dawn, published by Trepidation Comics and the one-shot Painkiller Jane #01 for Dynamite Entertainment. he also worked on the series New Battlestar Galactica Season Zero with writer Brandon Jerwa. Jack penciled and inked the entire series, with the exception of the first edition, and also illustrated some covers. That series became his first known work.

In 2009, he worked for Marvel Comics in a one-shot comic based on the American TV series Jesse James is a Dead Man with writer Mac Foster and in Avengers Invaders #11 e #12 among Alex Ross, Steve Sadowski and writer Jim Krueger. As soon as he finished that job, Dynamite offered him an exclusive contract until 2014.

In that same year, he joined the special Project Superpowers series plotted by Alex Ross and scripted by Joe Casey and illustrated Meet the Bad Guys #4 The Scarab Supremacy, colored by Marcelo Maiolo.

==== Red Sonja Series ====
In the early 2000s, Dynamite acquired the comic book rights to Red Sonja and decided to bring back Sonja's classic bikini armor for her new series, which debuted in 2005. The series was an immediate hit, becoming Dynamite's best-selling title and firmly returning Red Sonja to mainstream popularity. The character now has a monthly series, together with a series of mini-series and one-shots, all published by Dynamite Entertainment. The main Red Sonja series features a number of cover artists as well as the regular team of writer Michael Avon Oeming and artist Mel Rubi.

Jack Herbert did cover work for that series in the issues Red Sonja #41–45 and also for Queen Sonja #1–5. During the year 2010, Jack Herbert worked in the title Queen Sonja making full pencils, inks and covers.

In 2011, when he was working in Black Terror #12,13 and 14 with Alex Ross and Phil Hester. Alex was looking for an artist to work with him on the Kirby: Genesis project and had already done some testing, but he liked Jack's art so much that invited him for pencils and inks. Kirby: Genesis is a series with 9 hardcover books based on the concepts and characters of Jack Kirby and was published during 2011 and 2012. The project had the script done by Kurt Busiek, arts by Alex Ross and Jack Herbert and colors by Vinícius Andrade. This became the best-known work of Jack Herbert in the comic book market until then and is considered by him, his most important work.

After Kirby: Genesis, Jack was responsible for the interiors of the pulp series Miss Fury, that was published in the years of 2013 and 2014. In the last two years in Dynamite, he has also worked on the titles like The Shadow and The Bionic Man vs The Bionic Woman.

=== DC Comics (2014 - until now) ===
In 2014, Jack is called to pencil Batman/Superman: Futures End #1 with Cliff Richards and Vicente Cifuentes and Superman #31 with Ed Benes, his firsts works for DC Comics as regular artist of the publisher. After that, he was the penciler of Red Hood chapter in Secret Origins #5. He then shares with Ken Lashley the art in Superman: Doomed # 2. Still in 2014, his participation in Superman/Wonder Woman #12 was marked by the hugging scene between Superman and Wonder Woman in a football stadium that is shared by many fans of the power couple on the internet.

In the next year, Jack contributes as penciller in six editions of Earth 2: World's End and in The New 52 Futures End #45 with several other artists like: Thompson, Cifuentes, Lemire and Jurgens. In late 2015, while drawing the pages for Titans Hunt #3, his art earned him praise from Jim Lee due to light composition. Jack met Jim Lee personally at CCXP that year in São Paulo. In that issue, he shared the pencils with Paulo Siqueira and Geraldo Borges.

In 2006, DC Comics started a Rebirth. DC Rebirth restored the DC Universe to a form much like that prior to the "Flashpoint" storyline while still incorporating numerous elements of The New 52, including its continuity. In this year, Jack works in the Rebirth titles: Green Lanterns Corps Edge of Oblivion #6 with writer Tom Taylor and colorist Hi-Fi, Green Lanterns #6 and #7 with plot of Sam Humphries and sharing pencils with Will Conrad, and in Trinity #3 as fill in, but his pages weren't published.

Jack is currently working with writer Phil Jimenez on Superwoman and colorist Hi-Fi. His art appears in the series from issue #6.

== Bibliography ==
=== DC Comics ===
- Superwoman #6,7 (among other artists), #8 (full pencils) (2017)
- Trinity #3 (among other artists) (2016)
- Superman: Return to Glory Vol.2, ISBN 978-1401265113 (among other artists) (2016)
- Green Lanterns #3,6 (among other artists) #7 (full pencils) (2016)
- Green Lanterns Corps: Edge of Oblivion #6 (full pencils) (2016)
- Superman #49 (full pencils) (2016)
- Batman and Superman #27 (among other artists) (2016)
- Titans Hunt #3 (among other artists) (2016)
- The New 52: Futures End #45 (among other artists) (2015)
- Secret Origins Vol. 2 (among other artists) (2015)
- Superman: Under Fire Vol. 5, ISBN 978-1401250959 (among other artists) (2015)
- Superman and Wonder Woman Vol.2 (among other artists) (2015)
- Earth 2: World's End Vol 1 (among other artists) (2015)
- Superman: Doomed Special #2 (among other artists) (2015)
- Superman and Wonder Woman Annual #1 (among other artists) (2014)
- Earth 2: World's End #10,12,13,14,16,18,20 (among other artists) (2014–2015)
- Superman #31 (among other artists) (2014)
- Superman and Wonder Woman #12 (among other artists) (2014)
- Superman: Doomed #2 (among other artists) (2014)
- Secret Origins #5 (among other artists) (2014)
- Batman and Superman: Futures End #1 (among other artists) (2014)

=== Dynamite Entertainment ===
- Miss Fury: Walk Through the Valley #1 Vol. 2 (full pencils) (2016)
- The Shadow: Revolution #1 Vol.2 (among other artists) (2013)
- Miss Fury: Anger is an Energy #1 Vol.1 (among other artists) (2013)
- Masks #5 (cover) (2013)
- The Bionic Man vs The Bionic Woman #1 (cover) (2013)
- Miss Fury #1–11 (full pencils) (2013–2014)
- The Shadow #7 (full pencils), #10–11 (cover) (2012)
- Kirby Genesis #0–8 (pencils and variant covers with Alex Ross) (2011–2012)
- Black Terror #12,13 (full pencils), #14 (among other artists)(2011)
- Black Terror Vol. 3: Inhuman Remains (pencils with Wagner Reis) (2011)
- The Art of Red Sonja #1 (cover) (2011)
- Queen Sonja Vol. 2: The Red Queen (full pencils) (2011)
- Queen Sonja #1–5 (cover), #6–10 (full pencils and cover) (2009–2010)
- Red Sonja #41–45, 67 (cover) (2009, 2012)
- Project Superpowers: Meet the Bad Guys, Scarab Supremacy #4 (full pencils) (2009)
- New Battlestar Galactica: Season Zero #1(among other artists), #2,3 (full pencils), #4–12 (full pencils and cover) (2007-2008)
- Painkiller Jane #1(full pencils) (2007)

=== Marvel Comics ===
- Avengers Invaders #11, 12 (among other artists) (2009)
- Jesse James Is a Dead Man, one-shot (2009)

=== Trepidation Comics ===
- Echoes of Dawn #1–4 (cover)(2006–2007)
