= Sterling Gates =

American comic book writer (born 1981)

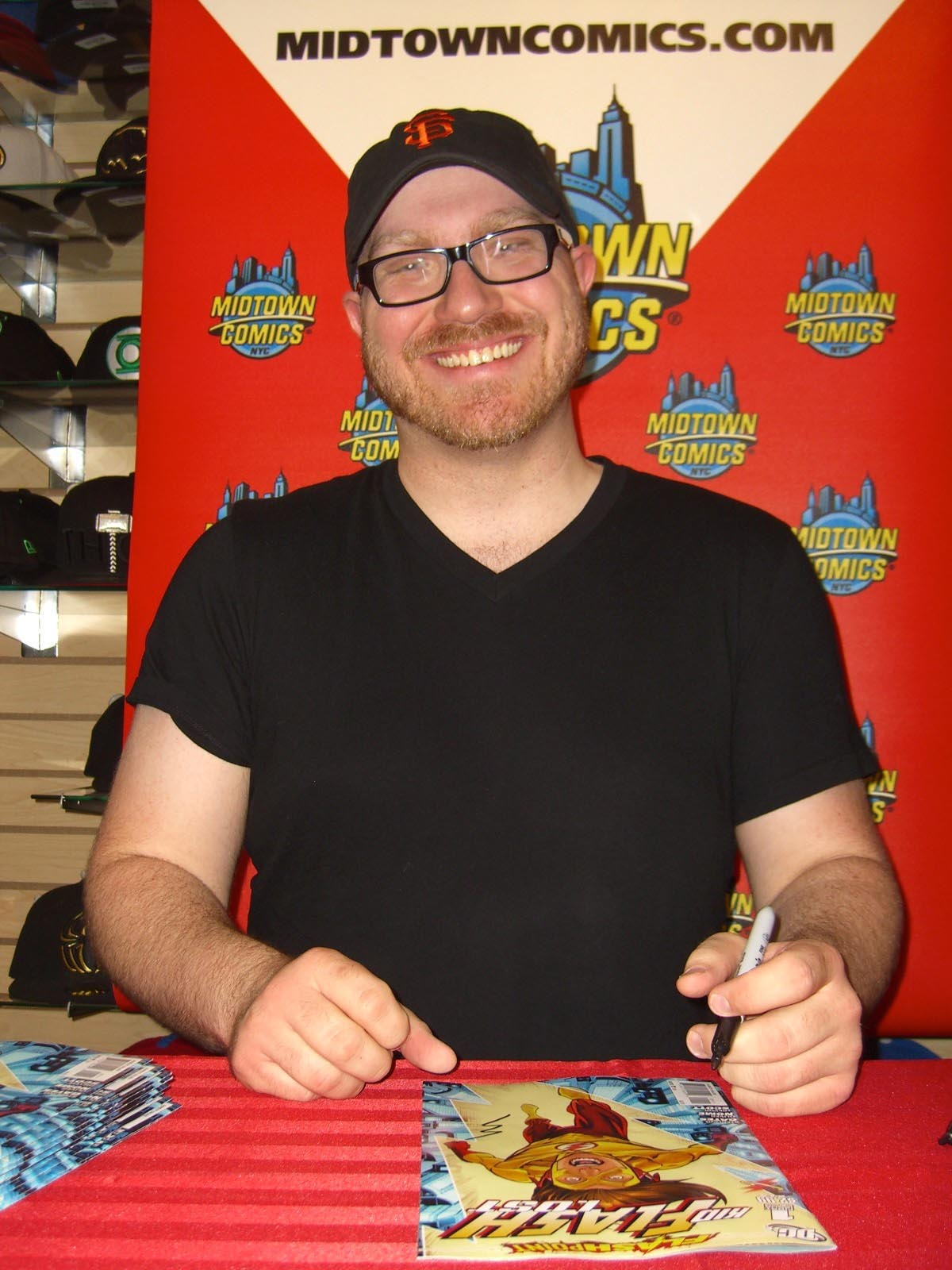
- Gates signing Flashpoint: Kid Flash Lost #1 at Midtown Comics in Manhattan
- Born: March 1, 1981 (age 45) Tulsa, Oklahoma, U.S.
- Area: Writer
- Notable works: Supergirl; The Flash

Sterling Gates (born March 1, 1981) is an American comic book and television writer.

== Early life ==
Gates, whose father owned a used book store with a large selection of comics, became a comic book fan at a young age, describing himself as "the DC kid" while dubbing his brother Alex "the Marvel kid". During his teenage years, Gates drifted towards the music scene, but rediscovered comics in the late 90s when his family had to inventorize the father's store before its closure. While attending University of Oklahoma, Gates wrote, drew and self-published short autobiographical slice-of-life comics and worked part-time at his then-local comic book store, Speeding Bullet Comics. After graduating with a degree in Fine Arts and a specialization in film and television production, he moved to Los Angeles.

== Career ==
In 2006, while attending WonderCon in San Francisco, Gates became acquainted with the comic book writer Geoff Johns. Upon learning that Gates had recently moved to Los Angeles and had aspirations to work in television and film, Johns recommended him for an interview with the writing staff of Blade: The Series, where he was eventually hired as a production assistant. After the series was cancelled, Johns offered Gates the position of his personal assistant, which Gates would later compare to a "writing apprenticeship". Despite planning to be a television writer, he created a few short scripts inspired by then-upcoming Green Lantern storyline "Sinestro Corps War" and gave them to Johns, who in turn passed them on to editor Eddie Berganza. Soon after, Gates made his debut as a comic book writer with a back-up story in Tales of the Sinestro Corps: Superman-Prime, illustrated by veteran artist Jerry Ordway.

After writing a few more short stories centered around the Green Lantern mythos, Gates followed Johns to the Superman family of books, taking over the Supergirl title. Gates' run on the series began as a tie-in to the inter-title crossover storyline "New Krypton", spearheaded by Johns (as the writer of Action Comics) and James Robinson (as the writer of the Superman ongoing title). When Johns stepped away from Action Comics and "New Krypton" to focus on other projects, Gates joined Robinson to co-write two limited series that would act as the culmination of the crossover storyline: Superman: Last Stand of New Krypton and Superman: War of the Supermen. Gates' run on Supergirl ended shortly thereafter.

In 2010, after DC Comics offered artist Rob Liefeld to draw a new volume of the series Hawk and Dove with a writer of his choice, Liefeld hand-picked Gates due to his work on Supergirl and War of the Supermen. The title, which was supposed to follow up on the plot threads from the "Brightest Day" crossover storyline, became a part of "The New 52" company-wide relaunch instead. Gates left the series after five issues while Liefeld took over both writing and drawing duties for the remainder of the run. Other projects of the period include a Kid Flash-centered tie-in to the "Flashpoint" crossover storyline and a Captain Victory series for Dynamite created as part of the "Kirby: Genesis" initiative.

In 2012, Gates was asked to help in developing a film script by Matthew Price, his former employer and owner of Speeding Bullet Comics. The result, a coming-of-age story described as a "superhero movie by way of John Hughes", premiered on the festival circuit two years later under the title The Posthuman Project. In 2013, Geoff Johns offered Gates to take over the writing duties of the recently launched ongoing series Justice League of America's Vibe as both Johns and his co-writer Andrew Kreisberg had to leave the title due to their increased workloads. In addition to Vibe, Gates ventured into the larger DC Universe with a number of one-off issues and a mini-series tying into the company-wide crossover storyline "Forever Evil".

In 2016, returned to the character of Supergirl with a digital-first series set in the world of the eponymous television series. Soon after, Gates was contacted by Andrew Kreisberg, one of the executive producers of the television series, who offered to write an episode for the show. In 2017, Gates joined the writers room of another Kreisberg-produced superhero series The Flash, before becoming the story editor for the show's fifth season and executive story editor for seasons six onwards. In addition to his work on live action series, Gates has also contributed scripts to the animated series Super Dinosaur and Spider-Man.

== Bibliography ==
=== DC Comics ===
- Green Lantern:
  - Green Lantern: Tales of the Sinestro Corps (hc, 200 pages, 2008, ISBN 1-4012-1801-6; tpb, 2009, ISBN 1-4012-2326-5) includes:
    - Tales of the Sinestro Corps: Superman-Prime: "Fear is a Baby's Cry!" (with Jerry Ordway, co-feature in one-shot, 2007)
    - Green Lantern/Sinestro Corps Secret Files & Origins: "Lessons in the Sand" (with Joe Prado, co-feature in one-shot, 2008)
  - Green Lantern Corps vol. 2 #21–22: "The Curse of the Alpha-Lantern" (with Nelson DeCastro, 2008) collected in Green Lantern Corps: Revolt of the Alpha-Lanterns (hc, 176 pages, 2011, ISBN 1-4012-3139-X; tpb, 2012, ISBN 1-4012-3140-3)
  - Adventure Comics vol. 2 #4–5: "He Primed Me" (with Jerry Ordway, anthology, 2010) collected in Blackest Night: Tales of the Corps (hc, 176 pages, 2010, ISBN 1-4012-2790-2; tpb, 2011, ISBN 1-4012-2807-0)
- Superman:
  - Superman: New Krypton Special (co-written by Gates, Geoff Johns and James Robinson, art by Gary Frank, Pete Woods and Renato Guedes, 2008) collected in Superman: New Krypton Volume 1 (hc, 176 pages, 2009, ISBN 1-4012-2329-X; tpb, 2010, ISBN 1-4012-2330-3)
  - Supergirl vol. 4 (with Jamal Igle, Fernando Dagnino (#41, 48, Annual #1), Matt Camp (#47, 49, Annual #2), Ivan Rodriguez (#52) and Bernard Chang (#57), 2008–2011) collected as:
    - Daughter of New Krypton (collects #34–43, tpb, 248 pages, 2018, ISBN 1-4012-7482-X)
    - The Hunt for Reactron (collects #44–50, Annual #1 and Action Comics #881–882, tpb, 304 pages, 2019, ISBN 1-4012-8574-0)
      - Includes the "Blood-Sisters" short story (co-written by Gates and Greg Rucka, art by Fernando Dagnino) from Superman Secret Files 2009 (one-shot, 2009)
      - All issues of "The Hunt for Reactron" crossover — Supergirl vol. 4 #45–46 and Action Comics #881–882 — are co-written by Gates and Greg Rucka.
    - Bizarrogirl (collects #53–59 and Annual #2, tpb, 224 pages, 2011, ISBN 1-4012-3169-1)
  - World's Finest vol. 2 #1–4 (with Julian López, Ramon Bachs, Jamal Igle and Phil Noto, 2009–2010) collected as World's Finest (tpb, 144 pages, 2010, ISBN 1-4012-2797-X)
  - Superman: Last Stand of New Krypton:
    - Volume 1 (hc, 168 pages, 2010, ISBN 1-4012-2932-8; tpb, 2011, ISBN 1-4012-2933-6) includes:
      - "Prologue, Part One: The Future is Prologue" (with Travis Moore, in Adventure Comics vol. 2 #8, anthology, 2010)
      - "Part One: Invaded" (co-written by Gates and James Robinson, art by Pete Woods, in #1, 2010)
      - "Part Two: Leaders" (with Jamal Igle, in Supergirl vol. 4 #51, 2010)
      - "Superboy, Supergirl and the Legion of Super-Heroes in: Unify" (with Eduardo Pansica, in Adventure Comics vol. 2 #9, anthology, 2010)
      - "Part Five: Bottles and Battles" (co-written by Gates and James Robinson, art by Travis Moore and Pete Woods, in #2, 2010)
    - Volume 2 (hc, 128 pages, 2011, ISBN 1-4012-3036-9; tpb, 2012, ISBN 1-4012-3037-7) includes:
      - "Part Six: Divided, Conquerable" (co-written by Gates and James Robinson, art by Travis Moore and Eduardo Pansica, in Adventure Comics vol. 2 #10, anthology, 2010)
      - "Part Seven: Distractions" (with Ivan Rodriguez, in Supergirl vol. 4 #52, 2010)
      - "Part Nine: This is the Way the World Ends" (co-written by Gates and James Robinson, art by Pete Woods, in #3, 2010)
      - "The Epilogue is the Future" (with Travis Moore, in Adventure Comics vol. 2 #11, anthology, 2010)
  - Superman: War of the Supermen #0–4 (co-written by Gates and James Robinson, art by Eddy Barrows, Jamal Igle, Eduardo Pansica and CAFU, 2010) collected as Superman: War of the Supermen (hc, 144 pages, 2010, ISBN 1-4012-2967-0; tpb, 2012, ISBN 1-4012-3187-X)
- DCU Holiday Special (anthology one-shots):
  - DCU Holiday Special: "Introduction" (with Karl Kerschl, 2009)
  - DCU Holiday Special 2009: "The Christmas of Doom" (with Jonboy Meyers, 2010)
- Faces of Evil: Prometheus (with Federico Dallocchio, one-shot, 2009) collected in Justice League: Cry for Justice (hc, 232 pages, 2010, ISBN 1-4012-2567-5; tpb, 2011, ISBN 1-4012-2564-0)
- Flashpoint: Kid Flash Lost #1–3 (with Oliver Nome and Scott Kolins (#3), 2011) collected in Flashpoint: The World of Flashpoint Featuring the Flash (tpb, 256 pages, 2012, ISBN 1-4012-3408-9)
- Hawk and Dove vol. 5 #1–5 (with Rob Liefeld and Marat Mychaels (#5), 2011–2012) collected in Hawk and Dove: First Strikes (tpb, 192 pages, 2012, ISBN 1-4012-3498-4)
- Justice League of America's Vibe #3–10 (with Pete Woods, Fabiano Neves (#3–4), Andres Guinaldo (#7–8) and Derlis Santacruz (#9–10), 2013) collected as Justice League of America's Vibe: Breach (tpb, 232 pages, 2014, ISBN 1-4012-4331-2)
- Man of Steel Prequel: Special Edition (script by Gates from a story by Geoff Johns, David S. Goyer and Zack Snyder, art by Jerry Ordway, free digital one-shot, 2013)
- General Mills Presents: Justice League #9: "Swap Meet" (with Neil Edwards, 2013)
- The New 52 Villains Omnibus (hc, 1,184 pages, 2013, ISBN 1-4012-4496-3) includes:
  - Justice League vol. 2 #23.4: "The Wild Card" (with Szymon Kudranski, 2013)
  - Justice League of America vol. 3:
    - "Freezing to Death" (with Derlis Santacruz, in #7.2, 2013)
    - "Freedom Fighter" (with Edgar Salazar, in #7.4, 2013)
- Forever Evil: A.R.G.U.S. #1–6 (with Neil Edwards, 2013–2014) collected as Forever Evil: A.R.G.U.S. (tpb, 144 pages, 2014, ISBN 1-4012-4939-6)
- Stormwatch vol. 5 #30: "Earthquake Weather" (with Jeremy Roberts, 2014) collected in Stormwatch: Reset (tpb, 272 pages, 2014, ISBN 1-4012-4841-1)
- The Flash: Season Zero #23–24: "Mentors and Meltdowns" (with Ibrahim Moustafa, digital anthology, 2015) collected in The Flash: Season Zero (tpb, 264 pages, 2015, ISBN 1-4012-5771-2)
- Adventures of Supergirl #1–13 (with Bengal, Jonboy Meyers (#4), Pop Mhan (#5), Emanuela Lupacchino (#6–7), Carmen Carnero (#8–9), Cat Staggs (#10) and Emma Vieceli, digital, 2016)
  - The series was first published in print as a 6-issue limited series titled Adventures of Supergirl (2016)
  - Collected as Adventures of Supergirl (tpb, 144 pages, 2016, ISBN 1-4012-6265-1)

=== Other publishers ===
- GrayHaven:
  - The Gathering #6: "The Mistress" (with Cassandra James, anthology, 2010)
  - Tales from the Abyss #1–3: "The Day I Lost Wallace" (with Amanda Rachels, anthology, 2012–2013)
- Unite and Take Over: Stories Inspired by the Songs of the Smiths Volume 1: "William, It Was Really Nothing" (with Ernie Najera, anthology graphic novel, 172 pages, SpazDog Press, 2011, ISBN 0-9839828-0-5)
- Kirby: Genesis — Captain Victory #1–6 (with Wagner Reis, Steve Scott (#3), Dennis Calero (#5) and Joe St. Pierre (#6), Dynamite, 2011–2012) collected as Kirby: Genesis — Captain Victory (tpb, 144 pages, 2013, ISBN 1-60690-330-6)
- Foster Anthology: "Partners" (with Hector Collazo, one-shot, Dog Year, 2012)
- The Posthuman Project #0 (co-written by Gates and Matthew Price, art by Mario Wytch, Speeding Bullet Comics, 2013)
- Love is Love: "Why" (with Matthew Clark, anthology graphic novel, 144 pages, IDW Publishing, 2016, ISBN 1-63140-939-5)
- Geiger 80-Page Giant: "The Karloff" (with Kelley Jones, anthology one-shot, Image, 2022)
- Generation Wonder: "The Night I Caught a Bullet" (short prose story for the superhero-themed anthology, 368 pages, Abrams Books, 2022, ISBN 1-4197-5446-7)

Preceded by Kelley Puckett	Supergirl writer 2008–2011	Succeeded by James Peaty
