= The New 52: Futures End =

Weekly DC Comics miniseries, run May 2014 to April 2015

- Cover of The New 52: Futures End #0 (May 2014 DC Comics). Art by Ryan Sook.

Publication information
- Publisher: DC Comics
- Schedule: Weekly
- Format: Limited series
- Genre: Superhero
- Publication date: May 2014 – April 2015
- No. of issues: 48, plus a 0 issue
- Main character(s): Frankenstein; Firestorm; Mister Terrific (Michael Holt); Batman (Terry McGinnis); Lois Lane

Creative team
- Written by: Brian Azzarello, Jeff Lemire, Dan Jurgens, Keith Giffen
- Artists: Issue 0: Ethan Van Sciver, et al.; Issues 1, 6, 9, 13, 17, 22, 25, 29, 34, 39, 40, 44: Patrick Zircher; Issues 2, 5, 12, 16, 24, 31, 35: Jesus Merino, Dan Green; Issue 3: Dan Jurgens, Mark Irwin; Issues 4, 7, 10, 14, 20, 23, 27, 37: Aaron Lopresti, Art Thibert; Issues 8, 15, 19, 26, 32: Scot Eaton, Drew Geraci; Issues 11, 18: Georges Jeanty, Dexter Vines; Issue 21: Cully Hamner; Issues 28, 38, 43, 44: Andy MacDonald; Issue 30: Tom Raney; Issue 33: Aaron Lopresti, Scot Eaton, Art Thibert; Issue 36, 41, 42, 46: Scot Eaton, Scott Hanna; Issue 45: Jack Herbert, Stephen Thompson; Issue 47: Andy MacDonald, Alberto Ponticelli, Allan Goldman; Issue 48: Andy MacDonald, Allan Goldman, Stephen Thompson, Freddie E. Williams II

The New 52: Futures End is an eleven-month weekly comic book miniseries, published by American company DC Comics from May 2014 to April 2015. The series is set five years in The New 52's future, and is written by Brian Azzarello, Keith Giffen, Dan Jurgens, and Jeff Lemire. Covers for the series are drawn by Ryan Sook.

== Publication history ==
In December 2013, DC Comics announced the series would launch in May 2014, with Keith Giffen, Brian Azzarello, Dan Jurgens, and Jeff Lemire writing. The series would start with a #0 issue, released on Free Comic Book Day on May 3, 2014, with issue 1 releasing later in the month. Artists on the series include Ethan Van Sciver, drawing the zero issue, along with Jesus Merino, Aaron Lopresti and Jurgens, as well as others who will be added as the series goes from one issue to the next. Lemire stated the series is "an exploration of DC's past, present and its future," with the writers trying "to explore the nature of what a hero is." It was also revealed that Ryan Sook would provide the covers, as well as character designs, for the series.

In January 2014, the writers revealed the concept for the story began to come together around June 2013. Giffen stated that each writer has a voice in each issue, and the four "have conference calls wherein we explain what we're hoping to do in the next issue, and then we parse out the pages – 'I'll trade you one for two' – and figure out who's doing what, and what order they're in." Jurgens added that each writer will concentrate on certain characters, saying "They'll encounter each from time to time, and then we start to work that wider scope thing, and then pull back and let them have their own adventures for a bit." Later in the month, Newsarama commented on the styling of the title as Futures End opposed to Future's End, speculating that the series may affect multiple futures seen in The New 52 since its launch. DC co-publisher Dan DiDio responded to this by saying, "what you're going to see is the potential of where the futures can be going" as well as the "direct impact it has on stories set in the current timeline in the DCU." In February 2014, with the May 2014 solicitations, it was revealed that the first issue would release on May 7, 2014, four days after the zero issue on Free Comic Book Day.

In April 2014, a teaser image by Mikel Janin, captioned "When Futures End... Blood Moon Shall Rise!", was released via the "Channel 52" back up in all comics. The image, in the style of M. C. Escher's Relativity, highlighted characters of the series, as well as red skies, which Newsarama noted might be a tease to an eventual crisis.

== Premise ==
Starting 35 years into the future of the DC Universe, before moving to five years in the future, Prime Earth is feeling the after effects of a war across the multiverse. As a new threat approaches the vulnerable Earth, Batman Beyond travels back in time to help the heroes of Prime Earth fend off the impending apocalypse.

=== Characters ===
With the series announcement, Lemire noted that The New 52: Futures End would mainly focus on Frankenstein, Firestorm and Batman Beyond, who will make his in-continuity debut in the series and was later confirmed by Azzarello to be Terry McGinnis. Lemire added that "The cast is quite large," and the writers will try "to create new characters and new concepts that will hopefully have a life beyond the series."

With the May 2014 solicit preview summaries in February 2014, it was revealed that former WildStorm properties Grifter and Stormwatch would play a role in the series. Their inclusion suggests a larger presence of WildStorm characters, who have generally been limited to solo titles since the start of The New 52. Later in the month, DiDio stated that the creative team were the ones to choose to use WildStorm characters, and stated DC has "a lot of faith in them. That's why they were in the initial launch. And from our standpoint, this gives us another opportunity to show why we included them in the beginning, and why feel that they're part of our pantheon now."

As well, the April 2014 teaser image by Janin showcased previously unknown characters for the series, such as Mister Terrific, Lois Lane, Robin, Hawkman, Apollo, Booster Gold and Amethyst, along with Frankenstein, Firestorm, Batman Beyond and Grifter.

== Plot ==
Thirty-five years into the future, Brother Eye has managed to transform the majority of superheroes into cyborg bugs. As the last remaining heroes launch one final attack on Brother Eye's power source, Bruce Wayne creates a time machine in an attempt to prevent Brother Eye's ascension and this future. Before Bruce is able to use the time machine, he gets ambushed by cyborg bugs, forcing Batman (Terry McGinnis) to travel through time instead. Arriving in the past, Terry realizes that he has arrived five years too late, with what he was trying to prevent already in play. After Terry is attacked by the cyborg bug of Plastique, which he subsequently dismantles, he learns that Mister Terrific is working on the technology which will lead to Brother Eye's ascension. He poses as a homeless person and slums outside Terrifitech Tower.

The DC Universe of five years in the future is one that has been rocked by enormous social upheaval slightly in the future of contemporary DC Comics stories. For example, following the events of Earth 2: Worlds End, thousands of refugees from the alternate universe of Earth 2 arrived on Earth after the destruction of their Earth; many are close doppelgangers of their Prime Earth counterparts. They were closely followed by the hordes of Apokolips, which had ravaged their world, leading to an all-out global conflict in which many civilians and heroes died. After the war, the governments of the world responded with hostility to the new interdimensional refugees, and scientists such as Mister Terrific developed new ways to detect who is from Earth or who is, in fact, an Earth 2 alien. Early in Futures End, further tragedies only add to the division and chaos in the superhero community. After Green Arrow appears to die, the two halves of Firestorm (Ronnie Raymond and Jason Rusch) have a falling out over their failure to save him. The crew of the spacefaring team Stormwatch is attacked and destroyed, leaving Frankenstein and the Atom to lead a team determined to recover them.

In another plot thread, Grifter is putting his abilities to good use; he can easily detect who is and isn't native to this Earth. He is eventually recruited by King Faraday to work with Deathstroke on Cadmus Island, where thousands of Earth 2 refugees are being inhumanely held captive. Elsewhere, Lois Lane's arc sees her determined to uncover the circumstances behind Green Arrow's death, but her investigations lead her to discover Tim Drake, the former and thought-deceased Red Robin, alive and masquerading as a bartender named Cal. On Earth, the public question why Superman has become more violent and taken to wearing a full-face mask, until Lois discovers and reveals that Shazam has taken over as Superman in Clark Kent's absence. The real Clark later returns to Earth, as discovered by John Constantine, due to the impending threat of Brainiac's invasion. It is Brainiac who, unknowingly, is manipulating Mister Terrific into creating Brother Eye. He, too, is causing the security issues at Cadmus Island which are causing difficulties for Grifter and Deathstroke.

In the final stretch of the series, Green Arrow is revealed to have faked his death, in collaboration with his Earth 2 doppelganger Red Arrow, has built an army to oppose the internment of Earth 2's refugees. When Brainiac attempts to capture New York City to add to his collection of cities from different eras of history, he is opposed by a united front of Superman, Mister Terrific, the Atom, and a new Firestorm (composed of Jason Rusch and Tim Drake's girlfriend Madison). Using the Atom's shrinking technology, Mister Terrific's T-spheres, and the Brother Eye code, they are able to shrink down and capture a city-sized Brainiac, ending his threat to their reality. However, Brother Eye's technology is still set to bring on a technological apocalypse. Terry McGinnis attempts to shut down Mister Terrific's development of his technology, but accidentally helps it along with the introduction of corrupted technology from his future. In a final battle, he teams up with Tim Drake, who has been persuaded to return to active duty as a hero, and sacrifices himself in order to prevent the rise of the machines. Honouring his sacrifice, Tim takes Terry's futuristic Batman suit and becomes the new Batman.

With Brother Eye having taken over all of the technology on Earth, Tim is forced to use Terry's time travel technology (repaired by the Atom) to travel back in time a further five years and destroy Brother Eye's satellite in the past (the near future in contemporaneous DC Comics). He convinces the Brother Eye satellite not to send a beacon in response to the distress call of Earth 2's refugees, leaving them stranded in their own dimension. In the final issue and the story's denouement, Tim Drake emerges in Terry's future, 35 years later, only to find his mission in the past was a failure and humanity remains enslaved and decimated by the machines. Accepting that it is impossible to defeat Brother Eye with time travel, he vows to form a resistance in the present day, setting up the new Batman Beyond (vol. 5) spin-off series starring Tim as Batman. The future of Earth's 2 now-stranded refugees, and the ultimate aims of Brainiac, are continued in the crossover series Convergence.

== September 2014 event ==
"The New 52: Futures End"
- An example of "The New 52: Futures End" 3D lenticular covers, highlighting the change of image from present to future, with the cover of Action Comics: Futures End #1 (September 2014 DC Comics). Art by Lee L. Weeks.

Publication information
- Publisher: DC Comics
- Format: One-shots
- Genre: Superhero
- Publication date: September 2014

Creative team
- Written by: Multiple
- Artist: Multiple

In February 2014, DC announced that as part of the celebration of The New 52's third anniversary, all ongoing titles published in September 2014 feature stories that tie in to The New 52: Futures End. DiDio stated "One of the things we wanted to do was not just look at it through the lens of the weekly series, but also take a month and flash forward, and see what the potential futures of all our characters might be in that month. So in that month, you'll get a chance to see where, in the next five years, our characters might finish up or might end up being." He added that like the "Villains Month" event in September 2013, these titles feature 3D lenticular covers, in addition to the 2D ones, saying, "The covers now will also have the ability to have a 'flicker' effect. That means that the images change and show the transformation going on... There is a level of change that is taking place with our characters during the course of this story."

Following the month of tie-ins, a third weekly title launched in October 2014. This title is set in the present DC Universe, while showcasing the events and circumstances that lead to the future depicted in Futures End. In April 2014, the title was revealed to be Earth 2: World's End, indicating it would be focused on the Earth 2 universe.

Titles were released as [Title]: Futures End #1. For example, Batman's issue released as Batman: Futures End #1.

List of "The New 52: Futures End" titles
Title	Writer(s)	Artist(s)
Action Comics: Futures End #1	Sholly Fisch	Pascal Alixe
Aquaman: Futures End #1	Dan Jurgens	Alvaro Martinez and Raúl Fernández
Aquaman and the Others: Futures End #1	Dan Jurgens	Sean Chen and Mark Irwin
Batgirl: Futures End #1	Gail Simone	Javier Garron
Batman: Futures End #1	Scott Snyder and Ray Fawkes	Aco
Batman and Robin: Futures End #1	Ray Fawkes	Dustin Nguyen
Batman/Superman: Futures End #1	Greg Pak	Howard Porter
Batwing: Futures End #1	Jimmy Palmiotti and Justin Gray	Eduardo Pansica and Julio Ferreira
Batwoman: Futures End #1	Marc Andreyko	Jason Masters
Birds of Prey: Futures End #1	Christy Marx	Robson Rocha and Oclair Albert
Booster Gold: Futures End #1	Dan Jurgens	Moritat, Steve Lightle, Stephen Thompson, Mark Irwin, Ron Frenz and Brett Booth
Catwoman: Futures End #1	Sholly Fisch	Patrick Olliffe and Tom Nguyen
Constantine: Futures End #1	Ray Fawkes	Juan Ferreyra
Detective Comics: Futures End #1	Francis Manapul and Brian Buccellato	Scott Hepburn
Earth 2: Futures End #1	Daniel H. Wilson	Eddy Barrows and Eber Ferreira
Grayson: Futures End #1	Tom King	Stephen Mooney
Green Arrow: Futures End #1	Jeff Lemire	Andrea Sorrentino
Green Lantern: Futures End #1	Robert Venditti	Martin Coccolo
Green Lantern Corps: Futures End #1	Van Jensen	Igor Lima and Ruy José
Green Lantern: New Guardians: Futures End #1	Justin Jordan	Dio Neves and Marc Deering
Harley Quinn: Futures End #1	Amanda Conner and Jimmy Palmiotti	Chad Hardin
Infinity Man and the Forever People: Futures End #1	Dan DiDio	Philip Tan and Jason Paz
Justice League: Futures End #1	Jeff Lemire	Jedd Dougherty
Justice League Dark: Futures End #1	J. M. DeMatteis	Andres Guinaldo and Walden Wong
Justice League United: Futures End #1	Jeff Lemire	Jedd Dougherty
New Suicide Squad: Futures End #1	Sean Ryan	Andre Coelho and Scott Hanna
Red Hood and the Outlaws: Futures End #1	Scott Lobdell	Scott Kolins
Red Lanterns: Futures End #1	Charles Soule	Jim Califiore
Sinestro: Futures End #1	Cullen Bunn	Igor Lima and Ruy José
Star Spangled War Stories Featuring G.I. Zombie: Futures End #1	Jimmy Palmiotti and Justin Gray	Scott Hampton
Superboy: Futures End #1	Frank Barberie	Tyler Kirkham
Supergirl: Futures End #1	Tony Bedard	Ema Lupacchino
Superman: Futures End #1	Dan Jurgens	Lee L. Weeks
Superman/Wonder Woman: Futures End #1	Charles Soule	Tom Raney
Swamp Thing: Futures End #1	Charles Soule	Jesús Saíz
Teen Titans: Futures End #1	Will Pfeifer	Andy Smith
The Flash: Futures End #1	Robert Venditti and Van Jensen	Brett Booth and Norm Rapmund
Trinity of Sin: Pandora: Futures End #1	Ray Fawkes	Francis Portela
Trinity of Sin: The Phantom Stranger: Futures End #1	Dan DiDio and J. M. DeMatteis	Phil Winslade
Wonder Woman: Futures End #1	Charles Soule	Rags Morales
Worlds' Finest: Futures End #1	Paul Levitz	Yıldıray Çınar and Paul Neary

== Reception ==
In February 2014, The New 52: Futures End, along with DC's first weekly title launching in 2014, Batman Eternal, were featured on IGN's "Most Anticipated Comics of 2014".

The first issue received mixed reviews. Richard Gray of Newsarama felt in the first issue, "The deliberately disjointed plot is designed to keep readers discombobulated and asking all the right questions, but mostly, 'why is this the new status quo?' Yet by leading with a group of characters not popular enough to sustain their own titles, The New 52: Futures End is missing the key hook of us being given new information about characters we've grown to care about," giving the issue a 6 out of 10. IGN's Jesse Schedeen gave the issue a 7.0 out of 10, saying, "while everything is competently executed so far, the... vague allusions to wars and other dramatic developments in the more immediate future of the New 52, [makes the series read] like a very ambitious What If? comic."

Overall, according to Comicbook Roundup, the entire series received an average critic score of 6.7, based on 400 reviews.

== Sales ==
For May 2014, Diamond Comic Distributors announced that The New 52: Futures End issues 1–4 were the 9th, 19th, 26th and 28th best selling titles of the month, respectively.

== Collected editions ==
Title	Material collected	Published date	ISBN
The New 52: Future's End Vol. 1	New 52 Future's End #0-17	December 2014	978-1401252441
The New 52: Future's End Vol. 2	New 52 Future's End #18-30	July 2015	978-1401256029
The New 52: Future's End Vol. 3	New 52 Future's End #31-48	September 2015	978-1401258788
Futures End: Five Years Later Omnibus	Action Comics: Futures End #1, Aquaman: Futures End #1, Aquaman and the Others: Futures End #1, Batgirl: Futures End #1, Batman: Futures End #1, Batman and Robin: Futures End #1, Batman/Superman: Futures End #1, Batwing: Futures End #1, Batwoman: Futures End #1, Birds of Prey: Futures End #1, Booster Gold: Futures End #1, Catwoman: Futures End #1, Constantine: Futures End #1, Detective Comics: Futures End #1, Earth 2: Futures End #1, Grayson: Futures End #1, Green Arrow: Futures End #1, Green Lantern: Futures End #1, Green Lantern Corps: Futures End #1, Green Lantern: New Guardians: Futures End #1, Harley Quinn: Futures End #1, Infinity Man and the Forever People: Futures End #1, Justice League: Futures End #1, Justice League Dark: Futures End #1, Justice League United: Futures End #1, New Suicide Squad: Futures End #1, Red Hood and the Outlaws: Futures End #1, Red Lanterns: Futures End #1, Sinestro: Futures End #1, Star Spangled War Stories Featuring G.I. Zombie: Futures End #1, Superboy: Futures End #1, Supergirl: Futures End #1, Superman: Futures End #1, Superman/Wonder Woman: Futures End #1, Swamp Thing: Futures End #1, Teen Titans: Futures End #1, The Flash: Futures End #1, Trinity of Sin: Pandora: Futures End #1, Trinity of Sin: Phantom Stranger: Futures End #1, Wonder Woman: Futures End #1, Worlds' Finest: Futures End #1	December 2014	978-1401251291

== See also ==
- DC One Million - A similar event about a possible future in the DC Universe

== In other media ==
Elements of Futures End were adapted into the 2020 animated film Justice League Dark: Apokolips War.
