= Supergirl (comic book) =

Comic book series

- Cover of Supergirl #1 (November 1972), featuring the Kara Zor-El version. Art by Bob Oksner.

Publication information
- Publisher: DC Comics
- Schedule: List: (vol. 1) Bi-monthly (The Daring New Adventures of.../vol. 2, vol. 3–8, Woman of Tomorrow) Monthly
- Format: List: (vol. 1, The Daring New Adventures of.../vol. 2, vol. 4–8) Ongoing series (vol. 3, Woman of Tomorrow) Limited series
- Genre: Superhero
- Publication date: List: (vol. 1) November 1972 - September/October 1974 (The Daring New Adventures of.../vol. 2) November 1982 – September 1984 (vol. 3) February – May 1994 (vol. 4) September 1996 – May 2003 (vol. 5) August 2005 – August 2011 (vol. 6) September 2011 – March 2015 (vol. 7) September 2016 – April 2020 (Woman of Tomorrow) June 2021 – February 2022 (vol. 8) May 2025 – present
- No. of issues: List: (vol. 1): 10 (The Daring New Adventures of.../vol. 2): 23 (vol. 3): 4 (vol. 4): 81 (#1–80, plus #1,000,000) and 2 Annuals (vol. 5): 68 (#1–67, plus #0) and 2 Annuals (vol. 6): 41 (#1–40, plus #0) and a Supergirl: Futures End one-shot (vol. 7): 42, a Supergirl: Rebirth one-shot, and 1 Annual (Woman of Tomorrow): 8 (vol. 8): 15
- Main character: List: Supergirl Specifically: (vol. 1, The Daring New Adventures of..., vol. 2, 5-8, Woman of Tomorrow) Kara Zor-El (vol. 3) Matrix (vol. 4) Matrix, Linda Danvers

Creative team
- Written by: List: (vol. 1) Cary Bates (vol. 2) Paul Kupperberg (vol. 3) Roger Stern (vol. 4) Peter David (vol. 5) Jeph Loeb Greg Rucka Joe Kelly Tony Bedard Kelley Puckett Sterling Gates James Peaty Kelly Sue DeConnick (vol. 6) Michael Green Michael Alan Nelson Mike Johnson Tony Bedard (vol. 7) Steve Orlando Marc Andreyko Jody Houser (Woman of Tomorrow) Tom King (vol. 8) Sophie Campbell
- Penciller: List: (vol. 1) Art Saaf (vol. 2) Carmine Infantino (vol. 3) June Brigman (vol. 4) Gary Frank Greg Land Leonard Kirk Ed Benes (vol. 5) Ian Churchill Jamal Igle (vol. 6) Mahmud Asrar Diogenes Neves Yildiray Cinar Emanuela Lupacchino (vol. 7) Brian Ching Kevin Maguire Eduardo Pansica Rachael Stott (Woman of Tomorrow) Bilquis Evely (vol. 8) Sophie Campbell
- Inker: List: (vol. 1) Vince Colletta (vol. 2) Bob Oksner (vol. 3) Jackson Guice (vol. 4) Cam Smith Robin Riggs (vol. 5) Norm Rapmund (vol. 6) Dan Green Ray McCarthy (Woman of Tomorrow) Bilquis Evely

Supergirl is the name of several comic book series published by DC Comics, featuring various characters of the same name. The majority of the titles feature Superman's cousin Kara Zor-El.

== Publication history ==
=== Volume 1 (1972–1974) ===
The first series featured the original Supergirl, Superman's cousin Kara Zor-El. It began publication in 1972 following a 44-issue run of Supergirl stories in Adventure Comics, ending with issue #424 (October 1972). The series lasted for 10 issues until 1974, after which the character began appearing regularly in The Superman Family commencing with issue #165. The release of the last issue of Supergirl was delayed for several months due to a nationwide paper shortage.

=== Volume 2 (1982–1984) ===
During its first year of publication, the second Kara Zor-El series was titled The Daring New Adventures of Supergirl. With issue #13, the name was shortened to Supergirl, and the title continued monthly publication for a total of 23 issues.

=== Volume 3 (1994) ===
In 1994, DC Comics published a four-issue limited series featuring a new Supergirl who was introduced early in the Post-Crisis era. Sometimes referred to as the Matrix, this new character was a protoplasmic duplicate of an alternate universe Lana Lang, granted superpowers by an alternate Lex Luthor. Having been brought to the mainstream DC Universe by Superman, she became romantically involved with the mainstream Luthor, who was posing as his own fictitious son Lex Luthor II. This limited series resolved many of the threads remaining from that storyline.

=== Volume 4 (1996–2003) ===
The fourth series featured a third Supergirl. This character was a fusion of the Matrix Supergirl and Linda Danvers (a Post-Crisis version of Linda Lee Danvers, Kara Zor-El's Pre-Crisis secret identity). The series ran for 80 issues, ending with the main character journeying to an alternate universe following the re-emergence of the original version of Kara Zor-El.

=== Volume 5 (2005–2011) ===
In 2004, DC Comics introduced an updated version of Kara Zor-El in the pages of Superman/Batman. The following year, she began appearing in her own ongoing series, with Superman/Batman #19 being republished as issue #0 of Supergirl. Sterling Gates took over the title in late 2008 with issue #34. Amy Reeder Hadley was attached as the new cover artist for the series in May 2010.

=== Supergirl: Cosmic Adventures in the Eighth Grade (2008–2009) ===
It is a 6-part mini-series featuring the Linda Lee version of Supergirl, written by Landry Walker.

=== Volume 6 (2011–2015) ===
DC Comics relaunched Supergirl with issue #1 in September 2011 as part of The New 52 reboot.

=== Supergirl: Being Super (2016–2017) ===
The four-part miniseries Supergirl: Being Super, written by Mariko Tamaki and pencilled by Joëlle Jones, is a coming-of-age take on Supergirl's origins. It depicts Kara as a seemingly ordinary teenager living in the rural Midvale with the Danvers, since the couple found her inside a pod in the middle of a field. Kara grows up aware of the pod and her unknown origins (which are glimpsed in dreams) and struggles to live a normal life as she discovers her astonishing super-human abilities, which she keeps a secret even from her closest friends.

=== Volume 7 (2016–2020) ===
A new Supergirl series written by Steve Orlando and incorporating elements of the Supergirl television series began in September 2016 (November 2016 cover date) as part of the DC Rebirth relaunch. The series took a three-month hiatus in April 2018 and resumed publication in August with the release of #21. The new creative team was writer Marc Andreyko and artist Kevin Maguire.

Starting with issue #37 in December 2019, writer Jody Houser and artist Rachael Stott helmed the series until cancellation in June 2020; issue #42 was the last in the volume. The final arc dealt with the fallout from Batman/Superman's "The Infected" event where Supergirl was "infected by a tainted Batarang that was meant for Superman"; as a result, Supergirl turned "into something of an unstoppable villain".

=== Supergirl: Woman of Tomorrow (2021–2022) ===
Kara Zor-El on the cover of Supergirl: Woman of Tomorrow #1, art by Bilquis Evely

Supergirl: Woman of Tomorrow is an eight-issue miniseries by writer Tom King and artist Bilquis Evely which started in June 2021. It focuses on Kara Zor-El's quest in space, aided by Krypto, and is told from the perspective of the new character Ruthye Marye Knoll, an alien girl that Kara meets who is looking for justice for her father's death at the hands of Krem of the Yellow Hills. The last issue in the series was released in February 2022. Susana Polo at Polygon commented that "with the final issue of Supergirl: Woman of Tomorrow I can definitively say this book slaps front to back, applying Sandman vibes to space adventure starring Supergirl and a plucky young space child. The best thing Tom King's done since Mister Miracle and Bilquis Evely just dropping mics on every dang page". Supergirl: Woman of Tomorrow was nominated for the 2022 "Best Limited Series" Eisner Award.

The miniseries was adapted into a feature film, simply called Supergirl and originally titled Supergirl: Woman of Tomorrow, from DC Studios, with Craig Gillespie directing from a screenplay by Ana Nogueira. Milly Alcock portrays the titular character. The film was released on June 26, 2026. King's original pitch for the comic's story was a team-up between Supergirl and the character Lobo in which they would take on similar roles to the characters Mattie Ross and Rooster Cogburn, respectively, from the novel True Grit (1968). While Lobo does not appear in the Woman of Tomorrow comic, the role is portrayed by Jason Momoa in the DCU film adaptation.

=== Volume 8 (2025–present) ===
In May 2025, a new Supergirl series was launched under the DC All In line, written and drawn by Sophie Campbell. Her arc now brings back pre-Crisis aspects and characters from her Silver and Bronze Age in DC Comics. Protecting both Metropolis and the Bottle City of Kandor as Supergirl, Kara decides to return to Midvale. There, she is shocked to find out that the Kandorian Lesla-Lar has taken over her place as both Supergirl and Linda Danvers to its citizens. Kara joins forces with Lena Luthor to defeat her.

== Collected editions ==
=== Volume 1 ===
The original 10-issue Supergirl (1972) has not been collected in print.

=== Volume 2 ===
Title	Material collected	Publication Date	ISBN
Supergirl: The Daring New Adventures Of Supergirl Vol 1	Supergirl Vol. 2 #1–12	July 2016	978-1401263461
Supergirl: The Daring New Adventures Of Supergirl Vol 2	Supergirl Vol. 2 #13–23	July 2017	978-1401271152

=== Volume 3 ===
The 1994 limited series has not been collected in print.

=== Volume 4 ===
Title	Material collected	Publication Date	ISBN
Supergirl	Supergirl Vol. 4 #1–9	April 1998	978-1563894107
Supergirl: Many Happy Returns	Supergirl Vol. 4 #75–80	August 2003	978-1401200855
Supergirl by Peter David: Vol 1	Supergirl #1–9, Supergirl Annual #1, Supergirl Plus #1 and a story from Showcase ’96	October 2016	978-1401260927
Supergirl by Peter David: Vol 2	Supergirl #10–20 and Supergirl Annual #2	April 2017	978-1401265533
Supergirl by Peter David: Vol 3	Supergirl #21–31, Supergirl #1,000,000 and Resurrection Man #16–17	October 2017	978-1401268794
Supergirl by Peter David: Vol 4	Supergirl #34–43	July 2018	978-1401273644

=== Volume 5 ===
Title	Material collected	Publication Date	ISBN
Supergirl: Power	Supergirl Vol. 5 #0–5	June 2006	978-1401209155
Supergirl: Candor	JLA Classified #2, JLA #122-123, Superman, Vol. 2 #223, Superman/Batman #27, Supergirl Vol. 5 #6–9	March 2007	978-1401212261
Supergirl: Identity	Supergirl Vol. 5 #10–19, DCU Infinite Holiday Special #1	November 2007	978-1401214845
Supergirl: Beyond Good and Evil	Supergirl Vol. 5 #23–27, Action Comics #850	August 2008	978-1401218508
Supergirl: Way of the World	Supergirl Vol. 5 #28–33	April 2009	978-1401221294
Supergirl: Who Is Superwoman?	Supergirl Vol. 5 #34–42	November 2009	978-1401270148
Supergirl: Friends and Fugitives	Supergirl Vol. 5 #43–47, Action Comics #881-882, Superman Secret Files 2009 #1	May 2010	978-1401227951
Supergirl: Death and the Family	Supergirl Annual Vol. 5 #1, Supergirl Vol. 5 #48–50	September 2010	978-1401229139
Supergirl: Bizarrogirl	Supergirl Vol. 5 #53-59, Supergirl Annual Vol. 5 #2	August 2011	978-1401270124

=== Volume 6 ===
Title	Material collected	Publication Date	ISBN
Supergirl: Last Daughter of Krypton	Supergirl Vol. 6 #1–7	October 2012	978-1401236809
Supergirl: Girl in the World	Supergirl Vol. 6 #8–12, 0	July 2013	978-1401240875
Supergirl: Sanctuary	Supergirl Vol. 6 #13-20	February 2014	978-1401243180
Supergirl: Out of the Past	Supergirl Vol. 6 #21-25, Action Comics Vol. 2 #23.1	July 2014	978-1401247003
Supergirl: Red Daughter of Krypton	Supergirl Vol. 6 #26-33, Green Lantern Vol. 5 #28	January 2015	978-1401250515
Supergirl: Crucible	Supergirl Vol. 6 #34-40, Supergirl: Future's End #1	July 2015	978-1401255411

=== Volume 7 ===
Title	Material collected	Publication Date	ISBN
Supergirl: Reign of the Cyborg Supermen	Supergirl: Rebirth #1, Supergirl Vol. 7 #1–6	May 2017	978-1401268466
Supergirl: Escape from the Phantom Zone	Batgirl Annual Vol. 5. #1, Supergirl Vol. 7 #7–11	October 2017	978-1401274337
Supergirl: Girl of No Tomorrow	Supergirl Annual Vol. 7. #1, Supergirl Vol. 7 #12–14	April 2018	978-1401278243
Supergirl: Plain Sight	Supergirl Vol. 7 #15–20	October 2018	978-1401284879
Supergirl: The Killers of Krypton	Supergirl Vol. 7 #21–26	April 2019	978-1401289188
Supergirl: The Sins of the Circle	Supergirl Vol. 7 #27–33	December 2019	978-1401294540
Supergirl: Infectious	Supergirl Annual Vol. 7 #2, Supergirl Vol. 7 #34–42	November 2020	978-1779505705

=== Volume 8 ===
Title	Material collected	Publication Date	ISBN
Supergirl: Misadventures in Midvale	Supergirl Vol. 8. #1–6	April 2026	978-1799506171
Supergirl: Hometown Horrors	Supergirl Vol. 8 #7–10, Summer of Supergirl Special #1	September 2026	978-1799506263
