= Kirby: Genesis =

American comic book series

Publication information
- Publisher: Dynamite Entertainment
- Genre: Mythology; Science fiction Superhero
- Publication date: May 25, 2011 – July 11, 2012
- Main character(s): Characters created and owned by Jack Kirby

Creative team
- Written by: Kurt Busiek; Alex Ross
- Artist(s): Jack Herbert; Alex Ross

Collected editions
- Kirby Genesis: Dragonsbane: ISBN 1-60690-342-X
- Kirby: Genesis: Captain Victory Volume 1: ISBN 1-60690-331-4
- Kirby: Genesis – Silver Star Volume 1: ISBN 1-60690-330-6
- Kirby: Genesis Volume 1: ISBN 1-52410-032-3

Kirby: Genesis is an American comic book limited series published from May 25, 2011, to July 11, 2012, by Dynamite Entertainment. It was based on Jack Kirby's work for Pacific Comics in the 1980s and the "Kirbyverse" line published by Topps Comics in the 1990s.

== Plot ==
In 1971, NASA launched space probe Pioneer 10 for a mission on Jupiter, but the probe later found a portal that drove it across the universe at light speed. The event was witnessed through a telescope by Kirby Freeman, a smart, young student from New York City who lives with his college partner and secret romantic interest, Bobbi Cortez, whose father, Jake, is a police officer. Some time later, two mysterious beings transported alien races across the universe. Kirby, Bobbi, and Jake must work together to solve the mystery these heroes are on Earth before a group of villains threaten to destroy it.

== Titles ==
Title	Issues	Publication schedule	Writer(s)	Artist(s)
Kirby: Genesis	#0–8	May 25, 2011 – July 11, 2012	Kurt Busiek and Alex Ross	Jack Herbert and Alex Ross
Kirby: Genesis – Silver Star	#1–6	November 9, 2011 – June 27, 2012	Jai Nitz	Mark Buckingham, Johnny Desjardins and Alex Ross
Kirby: Genesis – Captain Victory	#1–8	November 16, 2011 – July 4, 2012	Sterling Gates	Mark Buckingham, Johnny Desjardins and Alex Ross
Kirby: Genesis – Dragonsbane	#1–4	January 18, 2012 – June 5, 2013	Robert Rodi	Fritz Casas

== Trade paperbacks ==
- Kirby: Genesis (288 pages, August 29, 2012, ISBN 1-60690-342-X)
- Kirby: Genesis – Silver Star (152 pages, January 9, 2013, ISBN 1-60690-331-4)
- Kirby: Genesis – Captain Victory (144 pages, January 9, 2013, ISBN 1-60690-330-6)
- Kirby: Genesis – Dragonsbane (104 pages, August 17, 2016, ISBN 1-52410-032-3)
