= Tony Daniel =

American comic book writer and artist (born 1977)

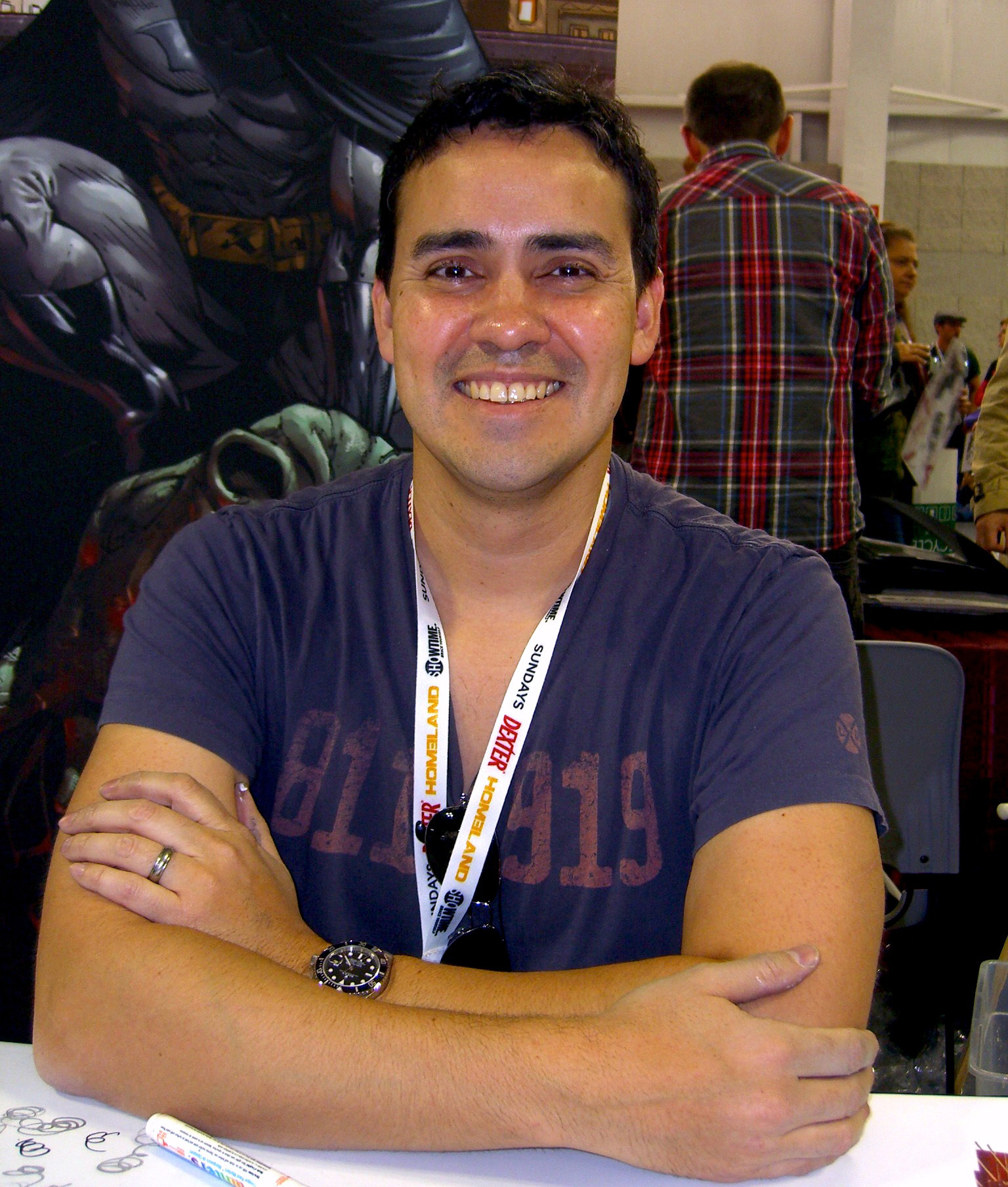
- Daniel at the New York Comic Con, October 2012
- Born: Antonio Salvador Daniel; 1977 (age 48–49)
- Areas: Writer, Artist

Antonio Salvador Daniel (born 1977), known by the Anglicised professional name Tony S. Daniel or simply Tony Daniel, is an American comic book writer and artist, known for his work on various books for DC Comics, including Teen Titans, Flash: The Fastest Man Alive, and Batman and Deathstroke and Nocterra as well as many other books as well as many covers for both Marvel and DC Comics.

== Career ==
Daniel worked on various titles with Image Comics including his own creation, The Tenth. He also worked on titles for Marvel Comics. He gained status at DC Comics with his run on Teen Titans with writer Geoff Johns. He finished out the short lived Flash: The Fastest Man Alive series with Marc Guggenheim from issues #11-13, which ended with Bart Allen's death.

From there, Daniel began his work for the main Batman title with writer Grant Morrison, beginning his run with issue #670. This issue began the Resurrection of Ra's al Ghul crossover. He and Morrison collaborated on the "Batman R.I.P." storyline during that time. After "R.I.P.", Daniel wrote and illustrated Battle for the Cowl, the main mini-series dealing with the story's aftermath.

In 2009, after Judd Winick and Mark Bagley's four-issue run on Batman, Tony Daniel took over for a six-issue arc handling both writing and art duties. Daniel worked with Grant Morrison again on issue #701-702. He returned as writer and artist starting with issue #704 in November 2010 with his arc on Batman coming to an end at issue #712. Shortly after, Daniel was announced as the writer and artist of the relaunched Detective Comics, which was dubbed DC's flagship series. In addition, he was announced as the writer of DC's The Savage Hawkman series, which he would stay on until the eighth issue. Daniel stayed on Detective Comics until the twelfth issue, by which time he drew an annual for the series as well.

In July 2012, as part of San Diego Comic-Con, Daniel was one of six artists who, along with DC co-publishers Jim Lee and Dan DiDio, participated in the production of "Heroic Proportions", an episode of the Syfy reality television competition series Face Off, in which special effects were tasked to create a new superhero, with Daniel and the other DC artists on hand to help them develop their ideas. The winning entry's character, Infernal Core by Anthony Kosar, was featured in Justice League Dark #16 (March 2013), which was published January 30, 2013. The episode premiered on January 22, 2013, as the second episode of the fourth season.

Daniel was announced as the artist for a two issue stint on the second volume of Justice League. He was subsequently announced as the primary artist accompanying Andy Diggle on Action Comics, following Grant Morrison's departure. However, after Diggle left the title after only issue #19 (Diggle was co-writer for #20 and co-plot issue #21), Daniel took on the scripting and art duties for the two following issues completing the three-part story "Hybrid", after which he too announced he would depart the series to work on a massive project for DC. This project was then announced in June 2013 to be Superman/Wonder Woman, with Daniel on as the artist. After working with Charles Soule on Superman/Wonder Woman, Daniel again returned to writing duties. Penciling and scripting the relaunch of the Deathstroke title, it sold out and headed off to a second printing.

== Bibliography ==
=== Dark Horse ===
- Adrenalynn: Weapon of War #1-4 (2001)
- Silke, miniseries, #1-4 (writer/art) (2001)
- The Tenth: Resurrected #1-4 (2001)

=== DC ===
- Batman #670-674, 676–681, 700-702 (artist), #692-697, 704-707 (writer/artist), #698-699, 710-712 (writer) (2007–2011)
- Batman: Battle for the Cowl, miniseries, #1-3 (2009)
- Countdown Presents: The Search for Ray Palmer – Crime Society, one-shot (cover, 2007)
- DC Universe #0 (3 page interior that preludes to Batman: R.I.P.)
- Flash: The Fastest Man Alive #11-13 (2007)
- Nightwing #138 (cover)
- Teen Titans, vol. 3, #26, 29–31, 34–37, 39–40, 43-44 (covers #26, 29–46, & 48)
- Teen Titans and Outsiders: Secret Files and Origins 2005 (cover and Teen Titans Hunt story)
- Detective Comics, vol. 2, #1-9, 12 (writer/artist), #10-11, Annual #1 (writer), #0 (artist)
- The Savage Hawkman #1-8 (writer, 2011–12)
- Justice League, vol. 2, #13-14 (2013)
- Action Comics, vol. 2, #19 (art); #20-21 (writer/art)
- Superman/Wonder Woman #1-6; #8 (art/cover); #10, 12 (cover) (2013–14)
- Deathstroke, vol. 3, #1-8 (writer/art); #9-13 (writer) (2014–16)

=== Image ===
- F5, miniseries, #1-4 (writer/art) (2000)
- Humankind #1-5 (writer) (2004)
- Shattered Image #1, 4
- Spawn #38, 40, 42, 44, 46, 48 (1995–96)
- Spawn: Bloodfeud #1-4
- Tales of the Witchblade #1 (1996)
- The Tenth #1-14 (1997–99)
- The Tenth Configuration (sourcebook)
- The Tenth: Abuse of Humanity #1-4
- The Tenth #0
- The Tenth #1/2
- The Tenth Special (collecting 1/2 and zero)
- The Tenth: Blackout TPB
- The Tenth: Black Embrace #1-4
- The Tenth: Darkk Dawn #1
- The Tenth: Evil's Child #1-4
- The Tenth: Nightwalker #1-4
- Tomb Raider #35-36 (2003)
- Witchblade #9, 78-79 (1996–2004)
- Nocterra #1-16

=== Marvel ===
- X-Force Annual #2
- X-Force #28, 30–36, 38-43
- Gambit & the X-ternals #1-2

Preceded by Greg Capullo	X-Force artist 1993–1995	Succeeded by Adam Pollina
Preceded by Randy Green	Tomb Raider artist 2003–2004	Succeeded by Wilson Tortosa
Preceded by Mike McKone	Teen Titans artist 2005–2007	Succeeded by Al Barrionuevo
Preceded by Andy Kubert	Batman artist 2007–2008	Succeeded by Mark Bagley
Preceded by Judd Winick	Batman writer 2009–2010	Succeeded by Grant Morrison
Preceded by Mark Bagley	Batman artist 2009–2010	Succeeded by Steve Scott
Preceded by Grant Morrison	Batman writer 2010–2011	Succeeded by Scott Snyder
Preceded by Scott Snyder	Detective Comics writer 2011–2012	Succeeded by John Layman
Preceded by Jock; Francesco Francavilla	Detective Comics artist 2011–2012	Succeeded by Jason Fabok
Preceded by Jimmy Palmiotti; Justin Gray (Hawkman vol. 4)	Savage Hawkman writer 2011–2012 (with James Bonny in 2012)	Succeeded by Rob Liefeld; Mark Poulton
Preceded by n/a	Superman/Wonder Woman artist 2013–2014	Succeeded by Doug Mahnke
Preceded by Justin Jordan	Deathstroke writer 2014–2016 (with James Bonny in 2015–2016)	Succeeded by James Bonny
Preceded by Edgar Salazar	Deathstroke artist 2014–2015	Succeeded by Tyler Kirkham
Preceded by Jason Fabok	Justice League artist 2016	Succeeded by Neil Edwards
