= The New 52 =

2011–16 DC Comics relaunch

- Cover of DC Comics: The New 52 #1, July 2011

Publication information
- Publisher: DC Comics
- Genre: Superhero
- Publication date: August 31, 2011 – May 25, 2016
- Main character: DC Universe

Creative team
- Written by: Various
- Artist: Various

Collected editions
- DC Comics The New 52: ISBN 978-1-4012-3451-5
- DC Comics The New 52 Zero Omnibus: ISBN 978-1-4012-3884-1
- DC Comics The New 52 Villains Omnibus: ISBN 978-1-4012-4496-5

The New 52 was the 2011 revamp and relaunch by DC Comics of its entire line of ongoing monthly superhero comic books. Following the conclusion of the "Flashpoint" crossover storyline, DC cancelled all its existing titles and debuted 52 new series in September 2011. Among the renumbered series were Action Comics and Detective Comics, which had retained their original numbering since the 1930s.

The relaunch included changes to the publishing format; for example, print and digital comics began to be released on the same day. New titles were released to bring the number of ongoing monthly series to 52. Various changes were also made to DC's fictional universe to entice new readers, including changes to DC's internal continuity to make characters more modern and accessible. In addition, characters from the Wildstorm and Vertigo imprints were absorbed into the DC Universe.

The New 52 branding ended after the completion of the "Convergence" storyline in May 2015, although its continuity continued. In June 2015, 24 new titles were launched, alongside 25 returning titles, with several of those receiving new creative teams. In February 2016, DC announced the New 52's successor, Rebirth, which reset the continuity to its prior status quo, and "synchronized" it with the New 52 continuity. The Rebirth branding was launched with the release of an 80-page one-shot on May 25, 2016.

== Publication history ==
=== Launch and Second Wave ===
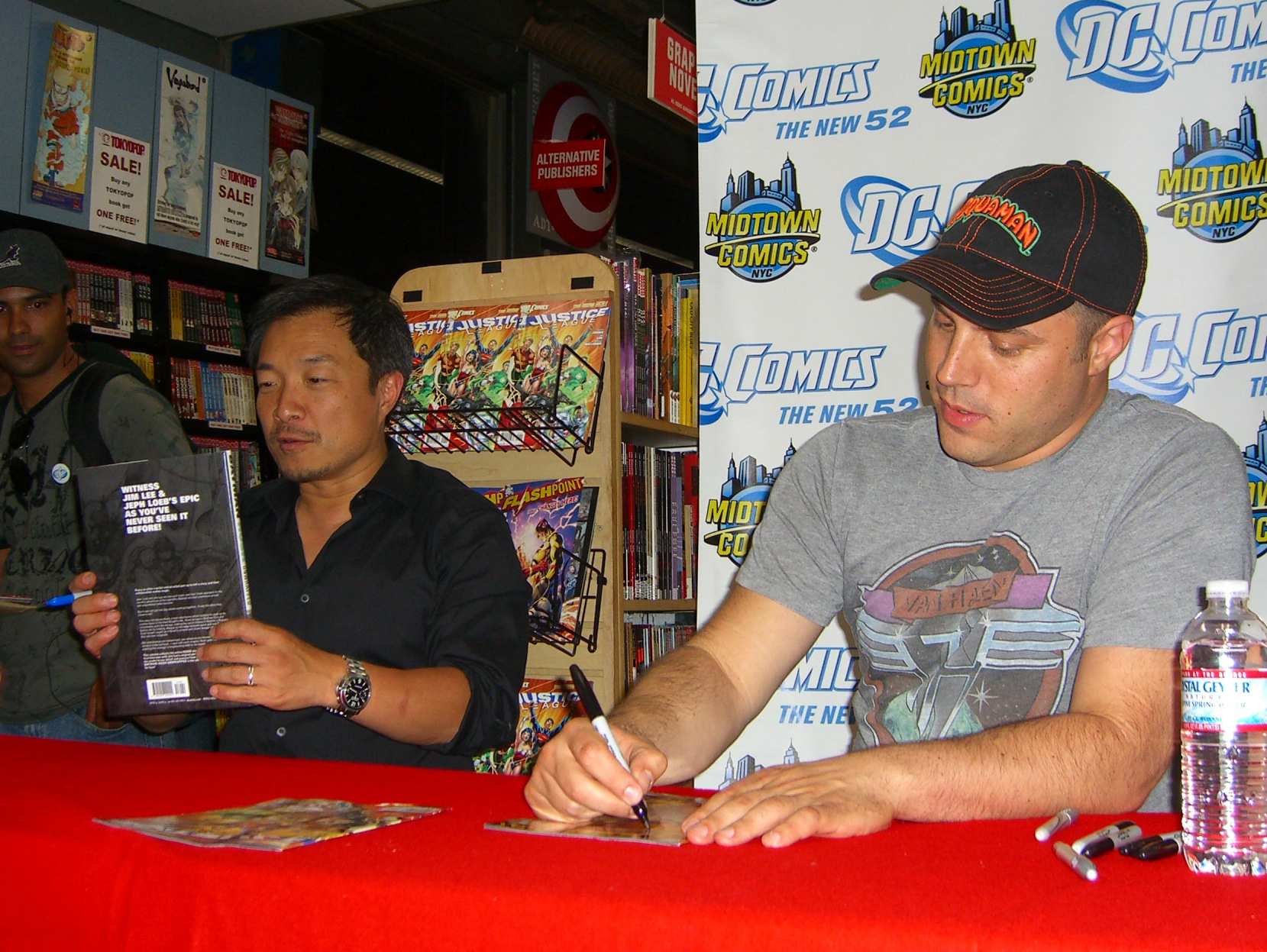
Jim Lee and Geoff Johns at the August 31, 2011, midnight signing for Flashpoint #5 and Justice League #1 at Midtown Comics Times Square

Following the conclusion of the Flashpoint limited series, DC cancelled and relaunched all titles set in the DC Universe with new #1 issues. The new continuity features new outfits and backstories for many of DC's long-established heroes and villains. An interview with DC Comics executive editor Eddie Berganza and editor-in-chief Bob Harras revealed that the new continuity did not constitute a full reboot of the DC Universe but rather a "soft reboot". While many characters underwent a reboot or revamp, much of the DC Universe's history remained intact. Many major storylines such as "War of the Green Lanterns", "Batman: A Death in the Family" and Batman: The Killing Joke remained part of the new continuity, while others have been lost in part or in whole. DC editorial constructed a timeline that details the new history and which storylines to keep or ignore.

On August 31, 2011, Midtown Comics Times Square held a midnight event at which they began selling Justice League #1 and Flashpoint #5. On hand to sign the books were DC Chief Creative Officer Geoff Johns, who was the writer of both titles, and co-publisher and writer/artist Jim Lee, who illustrated Justice League.

On January 12, 2012, DC announced that after their eighth issues, Blackhawks, Hawk and Dove, Men of War, Mister Terrific, O.M.A.C., and Static Shock would be cancelled and replaced with six new titles, which would reveal more of The New 52 DC Universe. The new titles were dubbed the Second Wave: Dial H, Earth 2, G.I. Combat, World's Finest, Ravagers and Batman Incorporated, which was absent from the initial line of Batman titles, and would continue Grant Morrison's storyline from before The New 52 involving the conflict between Batman and Talia al Ghul.

=== "Zero Month" and continued title changes ===
On June 9, 2012, DC announced that in September 2012, the first anniversary of The New 52 launch, all titles would get a zero issue, dubbed "Zero Month". In addition, the Third Wave of titles was announced: Talon, Sword of Sorcery, Phantom Stranger, and Team 7. With these additions to the line, Justice League International, Captain Atom, Resurrection Man, and Voodoo were cancelled.

In October and November 2012, DC announced new titles Threshold, Justice League of America, Katana, Justice League of America's Vibe, and Constantine. Threshold would be published in January 2013, Constantine in March 2013, while the others would be published in February 2013. DC later consolidated these new titles as the Fourth Wave of The New 52. G.I. Combat, Frankenstein, Agent of S.H.A.D.E., Grifter, Blue Beetle, and Legion Lost were cancelled as a result. Young Romance: A New 52 Valentine's Day Special #1 was published as the 52nd title in February 2013.

In January 2013, DC Comics announced the cancellation of I, Vampire and DC Universe Presents in April 2013. To celebrate the 60th birthday of Mad Magazine mascot Alfred E. Neuman, DC solicited variants drawn by Mad artists for 13 titles being published in April 2013.

Starting with titles released on January 28, 2013, all printed New 52 publications featured advertisements for the fictional news channel Channel 52. The two page back-ups, titled Channel 52, appear in all books, starting in February 2013, and replaced the previous "DC Comics: All Access" features. This news feature stars Bethany Snow, Ambush Bug, Vartox, and Calendar Man as reporters and anchors on the fictional in-universe news show. The art is provided by Freddie E. Williams II. Each week brings new content regarding the current or future goings-on in the DC universe. Channel 52 and Bethany Snow make an appearance in the second season of Arrow.

On January 30, 2013, DC announced that all titles released in April 2013 would be "WTF Certified". Each title would feature a gatefold cover and storylines and moments that will leave readers in a state of shock, including the return of Booster Gold. However, DC later dropped the "WTF Certified" branding and did not feature it on any of The New 52 books. In February 2013, it was announced that DC Comics would launch two new politically motivated books as parts of the Fifth Wave: The Green Team: Teen Trillionaires and The Movement. These would explore concepts similar to the Occupy Movement and the role money has in a world of superheroes. A wave of cancellations was also announced for May 2013, including The Savage Hawkman, The Fury of Firestorm: The Nuclear Man, Sword of Sorcery, Team 7, Deathstroke, and The Ravagers.

In March 2013, DC announced that it would launch four new titles in June 2013, making up the rest of the Fifth Wave: Superman Unchained, Batman/Superman, Larfleeze, and Trinity of Sin: Pandora. In April 2013, the cancellation of Batman Incorporated was announced for July 2013. DC also solicited two director's cut one-shots for the Superman Unchained book and the "Batman: Zero Year" story arc. In May 2013, it was announced that Batman Incorporated Special #1 would be published to finish off the Batman Incorporated series in August 2013. Another director's cut one-shot was solicited for the "Trinity War" story arc, along with the cancellations of Demon Knights, Legion of Super-Heroes, Threshold, and Dial H.

=== "Villains Month", "Forever Evil" and "Zero Year" ===
In June 2013, DC announced that all titles in September 2013 would be "relaunched" as a #1, featuring a villain from that respective book, as part of "Villains Month". For example, Detective Comics, which would have published issue 24 in September, would be released as Detective Comics #23.1 and Poison Ivy #1, with the issue being known by both titles. It was the first major crossover in the New 52 since "Flashpoint" and spun out of the aftermath of "Trinity War". Each book featured 3D lenticular front and back covers. DC also released 2D versions of the covers. Some books published multiple "Villains Month" issues, while others skipped publication in September 2013. For example, Batman, Superman, and Justice League are some of the titles that published four issues, while The Flash published three issues, Aquaman and others published two issues, and Green Arrow and others published only one.

In addition to "Villains Month", a seven-issue limited series titled Forever Evil, by Geoff Johns and David Finch, launched in September 2013 and focused on the Crime Syndicate, an evil version of the Justice League from Earth-Three, as they attempt to take over Prime Earth in the Justice Leagues' defeat at the end of "Trinity War". The "Forever Evil" event ran in other titles starting in October 2013, including three 6-issue tie-in books that launched: Forever Evil: Rogues Rebellion by Brian Buccellato and Patrick Zircher; Forever Evil: Arkham War by Peter Tomasi, Scot Eaton and Jaime Mendoza; and Forever Evil: A.R.G.U.S. by Matt Kindt and Manuel Garcia. Other tie-in titles included: Teen Titans, Suicide Squad, Justice League, Justice League of America and the "Forever Evil: Blight" storyline in Constantine, Justice League Dark, Trinity of Sin: Pandora, and Trinity of Sin: The Phantom Stranger. Forever Evil #1 was also reprinted in a director's cut one-shot in October 2013.

It was also announced in June 2013 that the "Batman: Zero Year" storyline in Batman would spin off into an event during November 2013, which would include other titles outside the "Batman" line of titles. The event, initially conceptualized to tell Batman's origin in The New 52, was featured in issue #25 of Action Comics, The Flash, Green Arrow, and Green Lantern Corps, along with Batgirl, Batwing, Batwoman, Birds of Prey, Catwoman, Detective Comics, Nightwing, and Red Hood and the Outlaws in the "Batman" line. The various books explored their characters' connections to Gotham City, and their first encounters with Batman.

On June 17, 2013, DC announced two new titles, Justice League 3000 and Superman/Wonder Woman as the first titles of the Sixth Wave, which began publication in October 2013. On July 16, 2013, DC announced Harley Quinn, the third and last title of the Sixth Wave, which began publication in November 2013. In August 2013, it was announced that Justice League 3000's initial publication would be delayed to December 2013, following creative changes on the title.

=== Launch of weeklies and start of "second phase" ===
In October 2013, DC announced Batman Eternal, a weekly year-long series which would feature Batman, his allies, and others in Gotham City. It was announced in January 2014 that the series would begin in April of that year. The cancellation of Katana and Justice League of America's Vibe was also announced, with the titles' final publication in December 2013, while Green Team: The Teen Trillionaires would end in January 2014. Following the release of Scribblenauts Unmasked: A DC Comics Adventure, DC announced cover variants for 20 titles published in January 2014, featuring Scribblenauts-inspired artwork.

In November 2013, DC announced one-shot issues Superman: Lois Lane #1 and Batman: Joker's Daughter #1 for February 2014, featuring Lois Lane and the new Joker's Daughter, respectively. DC also announced that 20 titles being published in February 2014 would feature steampunk-inspired cover variants. As well, Johns revealed that the end of "Forever Evil" in March 2014 would mark the end of the first phase of The New 52, with a new phase starting in April 2014, "one that will see the introduction, and re-introduction, of a lot of characters, concepts and a decidedly new center to the DC universe."

In December 2013, it was announced that another weekly year-long series titled The New 52: Futures End would begin publication in May 2014, with a free zero issue for Free Comic Book Day. The series would be set five years in the New 52's future. Co-writer Jeff Lemire stated that the series was "an exploration of DC's past, present and its future." Batman Beyond made his New 52 debut in the series. Solicitations published in December 2014 also revealed that 22 titles to be published in March 2014 would feature variant covers based on Robot Chicken, to promote the second Robot Chicken DC Comics Special.

In January 2014, DC announced Aquaman and the Others, Justice League United, Secret Origins and Sinestro ongoing series and Forever Evil Aftermath: Batman vs Bane #1 for publication in April 2014. In addition, DC revealed that Justice League of America, Nightwing, Stormwatch, Suicide Squad, Superman Unchained, and Teen Titans would end in April 2014. It was also announced that April 2014 publications would feature a second wave of variant covers inspired by MAD magazine.

In February 2014, Gail Simone revealed that her series The Movement would be canceled in May 2014 after 12 issues. It was also revealed that 19 titles published in May 2014 would feature variant covers drawn by Mike Allred in the style of Batman '66. A one-shot issue, Superman: Doomed #1 would also be published in May, as a tie-in to a crossover story arc of the same name.

DC later announced that as part of the celebration of The New 52's third anniversary, all ongoing titles published in September 2014 would feature stories that tied into The New 52: Futures End. DC Comics co-publisher Dan DiDio declared:

These stories aren't going to just be tied into the weekly. But what you'll be seeing is a lot of the writers who are working on series right now projecting forward—their ideas, their storylines, where they think their character might be five years from now. [...] The [lenticluar 3D] covers now will also have the ability to have a 'flicker' effect. That means that the images change and show the transformation going on... There is a level of change that is taking place with our characters during the course of this story.

DiDio added that new ongoing titles would launch in June and July to be included in the event. Following the month of tie-ins, a third weekly titled Earth 2: World's End launched in October 2014. This title is set in the present DC Universe on Earth 2, while showcasing the events and circumstances that lead to the future depicted in Futures End.

In March 2014, DC announced the launch of Infinity Man and the Forever People, the one-shot Harley Quinn Director's Cut #0, and the cancellation of Larfleeze for June 2014. March also saw the announcement of variant covers for 20 titles in June 2014, based on the DC Collectibles "Bombshells" statue line designed by Ant Lucia, the covers feature retro and pinup versions of female characters. DC also revealed two new publications for July 2014: an ongoing series Star-Spangled War Stories and a one-shot Harley Quinn Invades San Diego Comic-Con.

=== The Multiversity, new titles, new creative teams and DC You ===
In April 2014, DC announced Suicide Squad and Teen Titans would be relaunched in July 2014, with the former being retitled New Suicide Squad. A new series, titled Grayson, focusing on character Dick Grayson following his role in "Forever Evil", and a one-shot issue Robin Rises: Omega, tied into the Batman and Robin storyline "The Hunt for Robin", would also debut. It was revealed that July 2014's variant theme would be Batman's 75th anniversary, with 21 publications featuring "Batman 75" themes. April also saw the official announcement of The Multiversity, which began publication in August 2014; the 8-issue limited series was first mentioned by writer Grant Morrison in April–May 2009 intended for a 2010 release date. The Multiversity was intended to pick up on storylines left over from 52 and Final Crisis.

In May 2014, DC announced that six titles, All-Star Western, Batwing, Birds of Prey, Superboy, Trinity of Sin: Pandora and Trinity of Sin: The Phantom Stranger, would have their final publications in August 2014. It was also revealed that 22 titles published in August 2014 would feature "DC Universe Selfie" variant covers, focusing on the popular trend of taking selfies. A second Superman: Doomed one-shot was also announced.

In June 2014, DC announced six new titles for their Ninth Wave: Arkham Manor, Deathstroke, Gotham Academy, Klarion, Lobo, and Trinity of Sin for publication in October 2014.

=== "Convergence": the return of Hypertime and the Pre-"Crisis" multiverse ===
In February 2015, it was announced that following the Convergence storyline in May, the New 52 branding would not be used anymore, although the continuity of the New 52 would continue. That June, 24 new titles were unveiled under a newly introduced DC You initiative, and most of the 25 remaining titles of The New 52 had new creative teams.

The Multiversity Guidebook #1 changed the nature of the 52 multiverse. In this book, the New 52 multiverse was the result of a phenomenon called Hypertime. In the book, Brainiac takes cities from the Pre-"Crisis", Post-"Crisis", and Post-"Flashpoint" multiverses and placed them on a planet in another reality. He leaves a portion of himself behind; this part of Brainiac renames himself Telos and has the cities battle each other. Deimos of Skartaris tries to take complete control of the Telos' world but is killed by the Parallax-possessed Hal Jordan. This triggers a chain reaction that threatens to collapse the multiverse. To prevent this, Telos sends several of the heroes back to the Crisis on Infinite Earths to prevent the destruction of the original multiverse. Telos states "They have done it. Reality is resetting, stabilizing. Each world has evolved, but they all still exist." In an interview, writer Jeff King stated "Post-Convergence, every character that ever existed, in either Continuity or Canon, is now available to us as storytellers."

=== The end of The New 52 and DC Rebirth ===
In February 2016, DC announced its Rebirth initiative, a line-wide relaunch of its titles, to begin in June 2016. Beginning with an 80-page one-shot which was released on May 25, 2016, Rebirth also saw Action Comics and Detective Comics return to their previous numbering (#957 and #934, respectively), nearly all books releasing at US$2.99, multiple books shifting to a twice-monthly release schedule, a number of existing titles relaunching with new #1 issues, and the release of several new titles. DC used the Green Lantern: Rebirth and The Flash: Rebirth miniseries as examples of the basis for the initiative, which was described as a rebirth of the DC Universe. The Rebirth initiative reintroduced concepts from pre-Flashpoint continuity, such as legacy, that had been lost with The New 52 and built "on everything that's been published since Action Comics #1 up through The New 52."

== Changes to the DC Universe ==
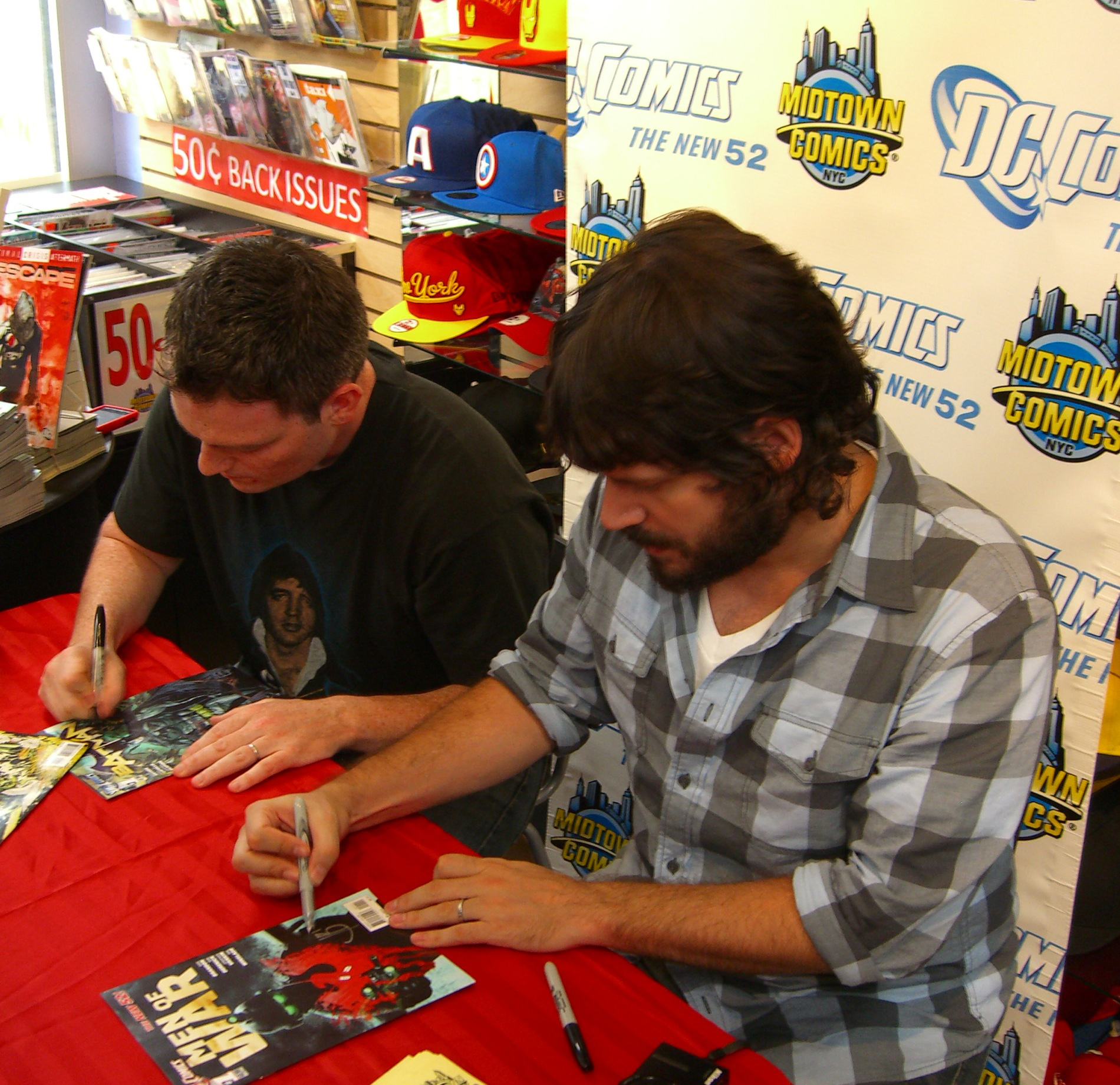
Scott Snyder and Ivan Brandon at a September 21, 2011, signing for Batman #1 and Men of War #1 at Midtown Comics

In June 2011, DC co-publisher Jim Lee revealed that he and DC Art Director Mark Chiarello had enlisted artist Cully Hamner to help spearhead the redesign of characters for the relaunch of the DC Universe.

In late July 2011, DC released The New 52, a free preview book giving solicitations and previews of all of the new titles launching from August 31, 2011. Notable continuity changes shown included Superman's two new looks: one which consists of jeans, a blue T-shirt with the "S" logo and a cape, the other consisting of Kryptonian battle armor that resembles his classic costume. Other notable changes included the integration of the WildStorm imprint's characters into DC continuity, with Martian Manhunter as a part of the new Stormwatch team in the relaunched Stormwatch series.

Justice League was the first book of the relaunch, with the first issue released on August 31, 2011. The first story arc takes place five years in the past, detailing the first meeting of the Justice League members and the formation of the team.

The initial run of first issues show a universe in which superheroes have only appeared within the last five years and are viewed with suspicion and hostility, with Superman and Batman being pursued by the police five years ago at the start of their careers. In the present day, organizations such as the United Nations and the United States government seek to exploit and control the superheroes through groups such as the Justice League International and the Justice League of America.

The "Batman" family of titles strongly resemble the past continuity. However, former Batgirls Stephanie Brown and Cassandra Cain have had their histories erased. Additionally, all of the Robins have been accounted for, including the previously non-canonical Carrie Kelley. Stephanie made her first appearance in The New 52 as the Spoiler in the teaser issue to Batman Eternal in Batman #28. Barbara Gordon recovered from the paralysis inflicted upon her by the Joker's bullet in Batman: The Killing Joke and returned to crimefighting as Batgirl.

As for Superman, his romantic relationship and marriage to Lois Lane has not transpired, and his adoptive parents Jonathan and Martha Kent have died. He was depicted as being slightly more short-tempered, retaining his American identity, and in a relationship with Wonder Woman. Various character changes were implemented, such as Starfire, Guy Gardner, and Tim Drake having their origins significantly changed. Sinestro was depicted as having returned recently to the Green Lantern Corps, where he became a villain again. Meanwhile, the Earth-Two version of Alan Scott was depicted as gay.

== Publications ==
=== Imprint titles ===
The imprint titles are divided into seven families of titles, revolving around central characters or themes. By the release of the October 2013 solicitations, DC was no longer grouping the titles by these families. Instead they began releasing one larger solicit, titled "The New 52 Group". However, titles that were not participating in an event for the month, such as "Forever Evil", were still grouped together in the larger solicit by the previous family headings.

The original Justice League team, as they appear in The New 52; art by Jim Lee

- "Justice League" – These titles featured characters related to the Justice League.
- "Batman" – These titles featured Batman and the "Batman Family" of characters.
- "Superman" – These titles featured Superman and the "Superman Family" of characters.
- "Green Lantern" – These titles featured the members of the Green Lantern Corps and the other Lantern Corps of the emotional spectrum.
- "Young Justice" – These titles featured teenaged characters and superhero teams.
- "The Edge" – These are titles with war, science fiction, western, or crime themes, and include titles and characters formerly belonging to the WildStorm imprint.
- "The Dark" – These are titles with supernatural, fantasy and horror themes, including titles and characters formerly belonging to the Vertigo imprint.

=== Post-imprint titles ===
In February 2015, it was revealed that after the Convergence miniseries in June 2015, DC would no longer use The New 52 name to brand their books; however the continuity established in September 2011 would continue. Dan DiDio stated, "In this new era of storytelling, story will trump continuity as we continue to empower creators to tell the best stories".

Rather than having 52 books all in the same continuity, and really focusing on keeping a universe that's tightly connected and has super-internal consistency, and really one flavor, we've really broken it up. We'll have a core line of about 25 books that will have that internal consistency, that will consist of our best-selling books. But then the rest of the line, about 24 titles, will be allowed to really shake things up a little bit.

— Jim Lee

The new titles would be about "reinventing key characters", such as Black Canary, Cyborg, Bizarro, and Starfire, with a new "contemporary tonality to ensure a diverse offering of comic books." In the initial "relaunch", 24 new publications joined 25 existing publications from before Convergence, with new titles continuing to be added.

In March 2015, DiDio revealed there would not be an "overarching brand on this" stating the relaunch was just "DC Comics, pure and simple." However, in May 2015, DC announced the advertising campaign DC You for the relaunch, which highlighted the four main themes of characters, talent, stories and fans. The initiative, which began in DC's print and digital comics on May 20, before transitioning to other digital content on June 3, was featured on print inserts and ads, as well as on the DC Comics website and across social media with a special hashtag of #DCYou.

== Reception ==
=== Sales ===
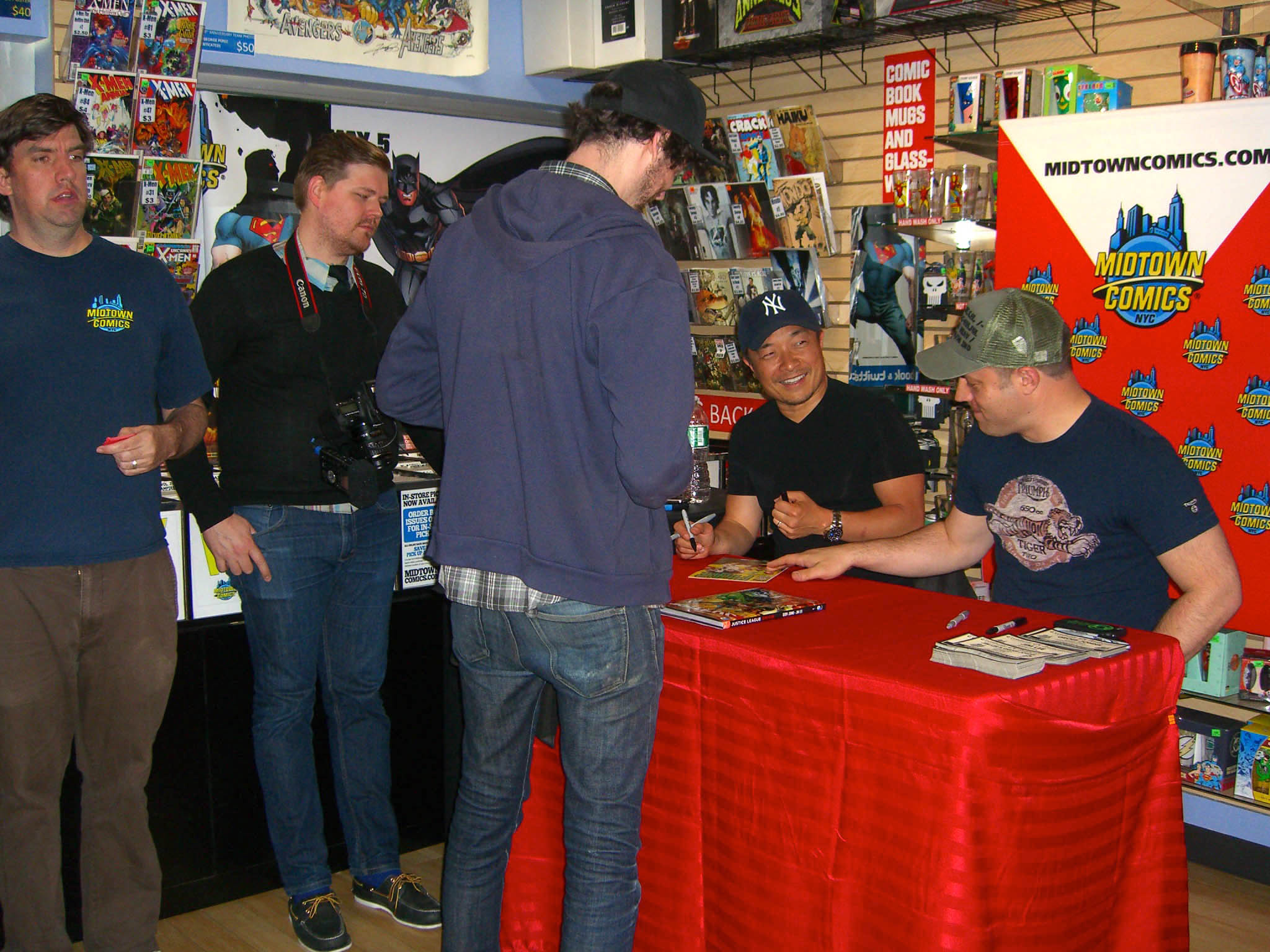
Jim Lee and Geoff Johns at a May 11, 2012 signing for the Justice League Vol. 1: Origin, the hardcover which collected the first six-issue story arc of that series

Pre-orders for Justice League #1 exceeded 200,000 copies. Justice League #1 has been sent back to press at least four times and all of The New 52's first issue titles sold out by September 24, 2011. For the month of September 2011, DC had eight of the top ten comic books, in spite of Marvel's heavily publicized replacement Ultimate Spider-Man, Miles Morales debuting in that title the same month. Justice League #1 was the top selling comic book in 2011.

Writer Warren Ellis was unimpressed with the relaunch's sales, stating that it garnered DC a half-point lead in dollar share and a five-point lead in units sold over Marvel Comics. Ellis also pointed out that the units DC sold were returnable.

Columnist Heidi MacDonald stated that, while the market share comparisons were correct, the sales figures for single issue books did not take into account the fact that returnable comics were downgraded by approximately 10%, and that DC's sales were about that amount lower than the actual sales, in order to allow for potential returns. MacDonald opined that while the sellouts and reprintings made returns unlikely, the sales would remain 10% lower throughout the period in which the books could be returned, which lasted through December 2011, and that actual sales would be adjusted for this factor in Diamond Comic Distributors' end of year figures.

Writer and ComicMix columnist Glenn Hauman wrote that relying solely on Diamond's numbers, to the exclusion of newsstand, overseas and digital sales, does not provide a complete measure of the relaunch's success. Hauman emphasized that the infinite long-term availability of digital editions meant that sales would continue on the books for weeks and months afterwards, and that the market share for that market was uncertain.

By December 2011, Marvel Comics regained the top spot for market share in both dollars and units. In April 2013, DC's unit share fell below 28%, but rose to a 45.17% market share in September due to high orders for Villain Month. It fell back to 30.77% by January 2014.

=== Critical reception ===
Forbes, The New York Times and The A.V. Club saw The New 52 as a good editorial move from DC. The Christian Science Monitor's Rich Clabaugh cited the relaunched Action Comics and Detective Comics as the strongest of the first week's releases.

In terms of the books themselves, Keith Phipps and Oliver Sava of The A.V. Club praised the art in Justice League #1, but thought its writing and structure was a weak point. In all, the two reviewers named O.M.A.C., Captain Atom, Animal Man and Wonder Woman their favorite books of the relaunch. They gave Batman high praise, and enjoyed Action Comics, Swamp Thing, Batwoman, Frankenstein Agent Of S.H.A.D.E., Demon Knights, Batman and Robin, Nightwing, Aquaman, The Flash, All Star Western, and Voodoo. However, they both disliked Detective Comics, Hawk and Dove, Legion Lost, Red Lanterns, Legion of Super-Heroes, DC Universe Presents: Deadman, Superman, Batman: The Dark Knight, The Fury of Firestorm: The Nuclear Men, and The Savage Hawkman. On the remaining titles, the reviewers were either split, or exhibited mixed reactions ranging from indifference to cautious optimism or curiosity.

Corrina Lawson of Wired dubbed the New 52 "a big, fat failure" from a reader standpoint, noting that the same stories could have been told without rebooting the fictional universe. She did, however, state that the New 52 was good from a business perspective, as it led to an increased market share for DC.

== Criticism ==
=== Lack of female creators ===
The launch of the New 52 was criticized for the lack of female creators, which had dropped from 12% to 1%, the latter figure represented by writer Gail Simone and Amy Reeder, an alternating artist on Batwoman who would not debut on that title until issue #6. This led to a tense interaction between fans and DC Comics co-publisher Dan DiDio at the 2011 San Diego Comic Con, where DiDio was asked by a fan about the reduction in female creators. DiDio responded by saying, "What do those numbers mean to you? What do they mean to you? Who should we be hiring? Tell me right now. Who should we be hiring right now? Tell me."

In an editorial responding to DiDio, ComicsAlliance editor-in-chief Laura Hudson wrote, "Women are half of the world, and a significant percentage of the DC Comics character stable, and yet only 1% of their creators. And the way that you treat and represent half of the people in your world—and by extension, half of the people in the real world who might potentially buy your books—should be more than a marginal concern."

On July 29, 2011, DC released a letter addressing the lack of female creators on their official blog, highlighting notable female creators currently being published by them and promising more in the future. Hudson called the letter "an enormous and very positive departure from how DC Comics has dealt with controversies about gender and race in the past, which was almost uniformly not to comment", adding, "While it remains to be seen what sort of meaningful changes in either attitudes or hiring practices will follow, it certainly leaves me feeling more optimistic than I have in some time, or maybe ever."

=== Portrayal of female characters ===
DC also received criticism for its handling of certain female characters during the relaunch, sparking discussion of perceived exploitative overtones in titles such as Catwoman #1 and Red Hood and the Outlaws #1. Laura Hudson of ComicsAlliance and Andrew Wheeler of Bleeding Cool criticized the relaunch for oversexualized characterization of its female characters, such as Catwoman, Harley Quinn, Starfire, and Voodoo, for cancelling books with female leads like Power Girl, and relegating the star of that series to the status of Mister Terrific's girlfriend. Writer/editor Jim Shooter disliked the treatment of female characters in general, and referred to the treatment of Starfire in particular as "porn for kids". Keith Phipps and Oliver Sava agreed with the observations of Catwoman and Red Hood and the Outlaws, but opined that Voodoo was a positive example how to incorporate a female character's sexuality as a relevant aspect of the story without appearing exploitative. Wheeler also complained that retconning Barbara Gordon's paralysis as a temporary injury from which she recovered, and restoring her as Batgirl, to the exclusion of Cassandra Cain and Stephanie Brown, made the DC Universe less diverse and inclusive. Responding to the criticism, Catwoman writer Judd Winick explained that it was DC that desired this tone for that book.

==== Restoration of Barbara Gordon's mobility and aftermath ====
In June 2011, DC announced that Barbara Gordon would be returning to the role of Batgirl in September 2011, in her own eponymous monthly comic, as part of a company-wide relaunch of all of their titles. In addition, former Birds of Prey writer Gail Simone would be writing the series. This announcement became one of the most controversial aspects of the DC Comics relaunch. Supporters of Barbara Gordon in her persona as Oracle have expressed dismay over losing an iconic character for the disabled community. Journalist and blogger Jill Pantozzi, who is diagnosed with muscular dystrophy, stated that:

[...] people being disabled is part of the real world, it is essential it be part of the fictional world as well... Writer Kevin Van Hook did a great job showing what disabled individuals have to go through in the mini-series Oracle: The Cure. It's that type of honesty I expect more of ... While some diverse characters were mishandled over the years, Oracle was always treated with the utmost respect but this move is the most disrespectful I've seen in a long time.

Simone responded directly by stating that at times when others had attempted to restore Gordon's mobility, she fought to keep her as a disabled character, even in light of requests from readers who also had disabilities that wished to see the character healed. However, part of her reasoning for reversing her decision and writing Batgirl with Gordon as the title character was that:

[a]rms and legs get ripped off, and they grow back, somehow. Graves don't stay filled. But the one constant is that Barbara stays in that chair. Role model or not, that is problematic and uncomfortable, and the excuses to not cure her, in a world of purple rays and magic and super-science, are often unconvincing or wholly meta-textual. And the longer it goes on, the more it has stretched credibility. But now, everything has changed. If nearly everyone in the DCU, not just Batgirl but almost everyone, is now at a much earlier stage in their career, then my main objection no longer applies, because we are seeing Barbara at an earlier starting point.

Former Batman writer and editor Dennis O'Neil and Oracle co-creator John Ostrander expressed disappointment over the change. O'Neil stated that during his tenure at DC, "[W]e had hordes of people in spandex beating up criminals ... We didn't have anybody like Oracle, who overcame a disability and was just as valuable and just as effective in a way that didn't involve violence." However, he also stated that from an alternate point of view, "Barbara Gordon's perception in the mainstream public as Batgirl would be a very valid consideration." Ostrander continues to view Oracle as a stronger character than Batgirl, but has also expressed faith in Gail Simone's skills as a writer. He commented that "[t]imes change and characters and people evolve. I changed things when I wrote characters, including changing Barbara to Oracle. Others do the same for this era ... Gail Simone is a good friend and a wonderful writer and I'm sure her work will be wonderful."

=== Editorial controversies ===
A number of editorial controversies emerged in the wake of The New 52, prompting Topless Robot, a genre website owned by The Village Voice, to publish an article in September 2013, "The Eight Biggest DC Creative Screw-Ups Since the New 52 Began". A number of these controversies concerned firings or resignations of creators which, in some cases, stemmed from conflicts between those creators and editorial decisions.

Writer/artist George Pérez, who left Superman after six issues, explained his departure in July 2012 as a result of the level of editorial oversight exerted on the title. In addition, he was frustrated by the inconsistent reasons given for rewrites of his material, the inability of editors to answer basic questions about the new Superman's status quo, such as whether his adoptive parents were still alive, and the restrictions created by not being told that Action Comics, with which Superman had to remain consistent, was set five years before Superman, a situation complicated by the fact that Action writer Grant Morrison was not forthcoming about their plans.

In the following month Rob Liefeld, who had been hired by DC to plot Grifter and The Savage Hawkman, and to plot and draw Deathstroke, and who had indicated the previous month that his run on those titles would last into 2013, announced that he was quitting DC Comics, with his last issues being the #0 issues to be published that September. Though he characterized his experience on The New 52 as positive overall, he did not disguise his animosity toward editor Brian Smith, with whom he clashed, being among his reasons for leaving the company. Other reasons he cited were frequent rewrites of his material, and the overall corporate culture that was more prevalent now that both DC and Marvel were owned by large media conglomerates. Liefeld also referred to Scott Clark's artwork on Grifter as "crap". In response to these events, artist Pete Woods defended DC editorial, stating that the restrictions placed on creators was the result of a plan they had for all 52 of their titles that required them to be consistent with one another. Marvel's Senior Vice President of Publishing Tom Brevoort and writer Gail Simone defended Brian Smith, disputing Liefeld's characterization of him, leading to a heated exchange on Twitter between Liefeld and Brevoort, and eventually head Batman writer Scott Snyder as well.

In late November 2012, Rich Johnston of Bleeding Cool noted the possibility of Gail Simone leaving Batgirl and possibly DC Comics as a whole. In December 2012, Simone had revealed that she was no longer the writer of Batgirl, despite the title being a consistent top-seller which had received favorable reviews. She had been informed by her new editor, Brian Cunningham, via e-mail of the creative change. Ray Fawkes would fill in for two issues, Batgirl #17 and 18. Twelve days after being fired, Simone announced that she had been re-hired as the writer of Batgirl, and that she would return following Fawkes' issues.

In March 2013, both Andy Diggle and Joshua Hale Fialkov announced that they would be leaving their writing duties at DC Comics. Diggle had previously signed as ongoing writer of Action Comics starting with issue #19, following Grant Morrison's run on the title. However, Diggle later announced that he would be leaving the title before the first issue had been published, citing professional reasons. He is credited as the sole writer in issue #19. Series artist Tony Daniel finished Diggle's work on the title as a scripter. Fialkov was signed to write both Red Lanterns and Green Lantern Corps following Geoff Johns's departure from the Green Lantern line; however, Fialkov left DC Comics without a single issue being written by him due to creative differences with editorial.

In September 2013, J. H. Williams III and Haden Blackman announced their intention to leave Batwoman with issue 26, citing last-minute editorial changes as the reason. Among these editorial decisions was a prohibition on having the title character marry her fiancée Maggie Sawyer. Co-Publisher Dan DiDio explained that the major superheroes in the Batman family of books should not get married because finding true happiness would undermine the angst and turmoil that typify those characters, and their commitment to the superhero lives they lead. Writer Marc Andreyko, who is openly gay himself, took over the title with issue 25, which featured a "Batman: Zero Year" tie-in. This creative change interrupted the finale to Williams' and Blackman's work on the title; they had already written issues 25 and 26 prior to their departure. Andreyko resolved Batwoman #24's cliffhanger ending in Batwoman Annual #1.

== In other media ==
- In the video games Batman: Arkham Origins, Batman: Arkham Origins Blackgate, and Batman: Arkham Knight, skins based on Batman's New 52 costume design and the Batman of Earth 2's New 52 design, are available to be unlocked, as well as a metallic version in Origins and suits for Nightwing and Robin in Knight.
- In the video game Injustice: Gods Among Us, three alternate costumes based on The New 52 designs of Batman, Superman, and Wonder Woman were packaged with the Collector's Edition of the game. "The New 52" skin pack was later released as DLC, alongside an "Earth 2" skin pack, featuring Solomon Grundy, the Flash and Hawkgirl's designs from the Earth 2 series. Alternate costumes based on The New 52 designs of Nightwing, the Flash, Green Lantern, and Shazam are also unlockable in the game. In the PlayStation 4 edition of the game, a skin based on The New 52 Black Adam is available.
- The 2014 direct-to-video animated film, Justice League: War, is based on the first New 52 Justice League storyline, "Origin". Aquaman's New 52 origin is examined in the DC Universe animated film Justice League: Throne of Atlantis.
- Many of the design changes to DC Comics characters brought about by the New 52 continue to persist in licensed products and representations of the characters outside of comics. For instance, DC characters as they appear in theme parks and attractions at various Six Flags parks as well as in the extensive DC Comics representations at both Warner Bros. World Abu Dhabi and Warner Bros. Movie World in Australia are represented by their New 52 character designs. Character meet-and-greets with DC superheroes and villains at these parks also feature performers wearing physical costumes based on New 52 character designs.

== See also ==
- "Flashpoint", the storyline that leads directly into The New 52
- DC Rebirth, the initiative that follows The New 52
- DC Implosion, a 1978 event in which DC cancelled or reformatted many of its titles, although not for the purposes of rebooting the fictional universe
- "Crisis on Infinite Earths", a similar 1985 storyline, used to simplify and reboot concepts in the DC Universe
- "Infinite Crisis", the 2005–2006 sequel storyline to Crisis on Infinite Earths
