= Superman/Wonder Woman =

Comic book series

- Cover of Superman/Wonder Woman #1 (December 2013), art by Tony Daniel.

Publication information
- Publisher: DC Comics
- Schedule: Monthly
- Format: Ongoing series
- Genre: Superhero
- Publication date: October 2013 – May 2016
- No. of issues: 29 (plus two Annuals and The New 52: Futures End #1)
- Main character(s): Superman; Wonder Woman

Creative team
- Created by: Charles Soule; Tony Daniel
- Written by: List: Charles Soule Peter Tomasi
- Penciller: List: Tony Daniel Doug Mahnke Ed Benes
- Inker: List: Matt Banning Jaime Mendoza
- Letterer: List: Carlos Mangual
- Colorist: List: Tomeu Morey Will Quintana

Superman/Wonder Woman is an American comic book series published by DC Comics. The series was published from October 2013 to May 2016. Written by Charles Soule with artwork by Tony Daniel, it explores the relationship between Superman and Wonder Woman, two of DC Comics' most popular characters.

== Publication history ==
DC Comics launched Superman/Wonder Woman in October 2013. The series was written by Charles Soule, best known for his work on Swamp Thing, and drawn by Tony Daniel (Action Comics, Detective Comics). It explores the budding relationship between Superman and Wonder Woman, the DC Universe's most powerful heroes. About the series Soule said: "Obviously, the idea of Superman and Wonder Woman being romantic with each other is not brand new. That concept has been around for a long time. It was addressed in Kingdom Come, the great Mark Waid book. Most recently, in Justice League #12 (October 2012), they had the kiss heard 'round the world... They're arguably two of the most powerful beings in the whole DC Universe and they're romantic together so just imagine the adventures and excitement that can come from that". Regarding the dynamic of the characters Soule said: "Frankly, these are people that have a lot in common. There are maybe 100 people on the planet that can fly, and two of them are Wonder Woman and Superman. At the same time, they grew up in very, very different cultures and situations. They have extraordinarily different backgrounds and there is a lot that they have to learn about each other too". Soule continued: "One of the things that I would like to do is have the way they approach battles grow over time as they get to know each other better so that fights become more coordinated. Wonder Woman has the background as a warrior dating back to when she was very little. Ares, in the New 52, was her warrior teacher when she was 12. She has a strategic, practical approach to battles where Superman, it's not like he rushes in guns-a-blazing, but he has a slightly less schooled approach to his attack".

At Fan Expo Canada held in August 2013, Daniel said he wanted to create a book that "targets a little bit more of the female readership that’s been growing. And maybe a book that has a little bit of romance in it, a little bit of sex appeal, you know, something that would, for lack of a better example, that hits on the Twilight audience". Graeme McMillan of The Hollywood Reporter noted that the comparison to Twilight drew quick criticism from comic book fans on social media.

Doomsday and General Zod were among the first villains introduced into the series. Soule said: "We wanted to go big off the bat. We wanted to stake our claim and make it clear that this was a book that mattered — not just from the idea of the couple at its heart, but also from the events that would be depicted in it and their impact on the DCU as a whole, and in Superman's life and Wonder Woman's life".

The first story arc ended with issue #6 (May 2014) wherein Superman and Wonder Woman sacrifice themselves to thwart Zod and Faora's plan to conquer Earth. About their sacrifice, Soule said: "I think that they did what they needed to do in that moment. I thought it was a beautiful moment where they came together. As far as we know, they saved the world for the umpteenth time. I think that every relationship has its ups and downs. Right now, they're very, very strong together. Whether they'll always be that way – who knows? It's a relationship, so it could change. But right now – except for the fact that they blew themselves up – things are looking pretty good".

Superman/Wonder Woman was tied into the "Superman: Doomed" crossover event, which featured the first major conflict between Superman and Doomsday in the New 52. Soule explained that "Doomsday appearing in Superman/Wonder Woman was something that just seemed like a great place to start – we wanted Superman/Wonder Woman to launch big, so we thought we'd give them a big villain to deal with. Not very long after that we had our first big in-person summit on what this event was going to be, which was all the way back in last October... It was in that meeting that Doomsday was what we wanted to do, so as far back as then, we were talking about it. Obviously, the specifics have evolved, but Doomsday was the plan all the way back then". Soule also revealed that Lois Lane would make her first appearance in the series during the event.

Issues #30 and #31 were not published as single-issue magazines. Rather, they were included in various collected editions.

== Plot ==
=== "Power Couple" ===
In London, Superman and Wonder Woman meet up for a date and exchange gifts. However their date is interrupted by an unnatural storm forming in the North Atlantic Ocean. While Superman investigates the cause of the storm, Wonder Woman rescues a plane caught in its path and is mistakenly shot down by a Norwegian Navy vessel. Once aboard the ship, Wonder Woman is attacked by Doomsday.

Doomsday breaks Wonder Woman's arm, before vanishing into thin air. Once healed from her injuries, Wonder Woman takes Superman to Mount Etna to ask Hephaestus for weapons in order to defeat Doomsday. There, the couple is visited by Strife and Apollo, whom Superman throws into orbit after he insults Wonder Woman. Meanwhile, a caravan traveling in the Sahara desert is attacked by General Zod.

In Metropolis, Cat Grant publishes photographs, that were delivered to her from an anonymous source, of a kiss between Superman and Wonder Woman on her blog. Meanwhile, the Justice League of America intercepts Zod and are nearly defeated before the arrival of Superman and Wonder Woman. When the fight is over, Superman places Zod in custody in the menagerie at the Fortress of Solitude.

In London, Superman and Wonder Woman try to come to terms with the fact that their relationship has been made public. As the world reacts to the news, Clark Kent investigates how the information was leaked before checking in with Zod at the Fortress of Solitude. There, Zod tricks Superman into opening a portal to the Phantom Zone and releasing Faora.

Wonder Woman travels to Themyscira to console with Hippolyta about her relationship with Superman. Meanwhile, Zod and Faora escape from the Fortress of Solitude with Superman in pursuit. Wonder Woman joins the subsequent battle between Superman, Zod and Faora, before they agree to suspend the fight for another day.

In the South Pacific Ocean, Zod and Faora build a portal to the Phantom Zone, intending to bring through the armies of Warworld. Using the weapons created by Hephaestus, Superman and Wonder Woman nearly defeat Zod and Faora, but are themselves defeated after Apollo intervenes. Zod and Faora place Superman and Wonder Woman inside a nearby nuclear reactor, as they finish constructing the portal. However, Superman and Wonder Woman set off a nuclear explosion inside the reactor, destroying the portal before it is opened.

Following the explosion, Superman takes Wonder Woman to see Hessia, an Amazonian healer. With himself badly injured, Superman leaves to recover at the Fortress of Solitude. They later reunite in London and spend some alone time together on a rooftop and attend a nightclub. Meanwhile, Doomsday is awakened and surfaces from deep in the Mariana Trench, destroying a submarine on the way.

=== "Superman: Doomed" ===
During the "Superman: Doomed" storyline, Superman is infected with a virus after defeating Doomsday. Superman slowly undergoes a mutation that transforms him into a Doomsday-like creature. Wonder Woman and Batman come to the realization that Superman's mutation can be controlled through willpower. Wonder Woman urges Superman to fight the virus' influence, but Superman becomes aggressive towards her, as the virus begins to affect his mind. Superman eventually gains control and returns to normal but laments that his inner beast is still waiting to get out.

As the storyline continues, Superman is declared an enemy of the state and is attacked with a kryptonite bomb, causing his mutation to worsen. While a mutated Superman rampages in the jungles of Brazil, Wonder Woman asks Hessia for help. Hessia, believing Superman is beyond salvation, attempts to kill him but Wonder Woman takes Superman into outerspace, where the kryptonite has no effect. Superman momentarily regains control and decides to leave Earth. However, as he leaves, Superman is attacked by a group of Red Lanterns. Before things can escalate, Wonder Woman stops the fighting and convinces the Red Lanterns to let Superman go.

In space, a mutated Superman intercepts an Earth-bound invasion force led by Brainiac and the Cyborg Superman and rescues Lana Lang and Steel, who were headed to Earth to confront whoever unleashed the coma infection that is plaguing Smallville. Back on Earth, Lois Lane, who was brainwashed into becoming a servant of Brainiac, acquires Brainiac-like abilities and assembles an army of robots to construct a signal machine for Brainiac's arrival. Wonder Woman attempts to reason with Lane but Lane creates a robotic exoskeleton controlled by John Corben to fight her. After defeating Corben, Wonder Woman destroys the signal machine, forcing Lane and Corben to flee. Meanwhile, Superman reaches Brainiac's fleet and confronts Cyborg Superman.

After defeating Cyborg Superman, Superman returns to Earth and fights Brainiac's forces alongside the Justice League. Cyborg Superman recovers and oversees the construction of a massive space portal on the dark side of the moon. Cyborg Superman also destroys Steel's ship, but Steel and Lana manage to escape. While fighting Brainiac's forces, Superman turns his wrath on innocent villagers, however Wonder Woman stalls Superman long enough for Batman to purge all the Kryptonite from Earth's atmosphere, allowing Superman to return to normal. Meanwhile, the Justice League defeats Brainiac's army, but the portal on the moon opens and Brainiac's mothership comes through.

After Superman and Martian Manhunter push the mothership away from Earth, they save Lana and Steel and take them to the Fortress of Solitude. There, the remaining heroes realize Brainiac was targeting Metropolis and Smallville first as revenge for Superman foiling Brainiac's first invasion five years ago. Superman allows himself to mutate again; while Wonder Woman enters the Phantom Zone and attempts to convince Mongul to let the Warworld fight Brainiac.

== Critical reaction ==
In September 2013, Complex listed Superman/Wonder Woman as number 12 on its list of "The 25 Most Anticipated Comic Books of Fall 2013".

=== "Power Couple" ===
Professional reviews
	CBR	Comic Vine	IGN
Issue	Rating		
1	3.5/5 stars	4/5 stars	7.8/10
2	4/5 stars	5/5 stars	9.5/10
3	3.5/5 stars	4/5 stars	8.5/10
4	—N/a	5/5 stars	8.6/10
5	—N/a	5/5 stars	8.9/10
6	—N/a	4/5 stars	8.3/10
7	3/5 stars	3/5 stars	7.5/10

Jim Johnson of Comic Book Resources (CBR) gave the first issue three-and-a-half out of five stars writing: "Like Clark and Diana's relationship, this issue has its ups and downs, but it's like a good first date; one can't be sure where things are going to go, but so far it's gone well enough to want the second". Tony Guerrero of Comic Vine gave it four out of five stars: "Charles Soule gives a great mix of action, emotion and character development in this debut issue" and "Tony Daniel's art adds depth to the characters". Melissa Grey of IGN gave it a 7.8 out of 10: "While the issue isn't without its flaws, its strong characterization and impactful art enough to leave me wanting more".

Meagan Damore of CBR gave the second issue four stars: "As someone who is — frankly — leery of the Superman and Wonder Woman pairing, I didn't quite expect just how delightful Charles Soule and Tony S. Daniel's Superman/Wonder Woman #2 would be. As it builds toward an exciting story arc that is sure to wow, Superman/Wonder Woman is guaranteed to be a nice surprise". Guerrero gave it five stars: "Tony Daniel is rocking it in the art department and the book has the big epic feel it deserves. With the facets of the story Soule is laying out and Daniel's art, I can't wait to read more". Grey gave it a 9.5/10: "Where this issue truly shines is in the exploration of the relationship dynamics between Superman and Wonder Woman".

Greg McElhatton of CBR gave issue #3 three-and-a-half stars: "When you look at the main cast of the book and the characters that it pulls in, Superman/Wonder Woman almost feels like a member of the Justice League family rather than an offshoot of either Superman or Wonder Woman". Gregg Katzman of Comic Vine gave it four stars: "Soule successfully moves the overall narrative forward while also throwing plenty of variables into the mix. There's a lot of buildup in this issue and you can definitely feel all of the factors circulating". Joshua Yehl of IGN gave it an 8.5: "I wasn't sure what to expect out of a comic like this, but so far it has avoided all manner of cliche when it comes to the actual relationship. Soule has treated it with maturity and intelligence while also delivering some hardcore fights that remind you that even though they are lovers, they are also heroes".

Guerrero gave issue #4 five stars: "Charles Soule does a great job balancing the incredible feats the two heroes are capable of as well as showing us a more human side to them. Tony Daniel's art just keeps getting better and better. The back up story was a nice addition. It makes it feel as if we really got a bonus story in great issue". Grey gave it an 8.6: "The series is four issues in, and while there's certainly been a respectable amount of high-flying battles, writer Charles Soule and artist Tony Daniel have wisely chosen to focus on the ups and downs of the relationship at the heart of the book. Emphasizing the duo's super-powered adventures might be the more obvious choice when teaming up two of the DC universe's most formidable heroes, but the nuanced exploration of their very relatable personal struggles makes for a more captivating read".

Guerrero again gave five stars to issue #5: "Each month Charles Soule shows us the different facets to these two great characters. Tony Daniel's art and Tomeu Morey's colors here really do shine. Whether it's Wonder Woman thinking things over on Paradise Island or Superman trying to fight off both Zod and Faora, this issue will grab hold of your interest and smack you in the most loving way possible". Mike Logsdon of IGN gave it an 8.9: "Tony Daniel has never produced better material, as he continues to knock it out of the park panel after panel... Along with Daniel’s pencils, Tomeu Morey’s incredible coloring work helps to elevate the art even more, making it the perfect accompaniment to Soule’s insightful storytelling".

Gregg Katzman of Comic Vine gave issue #6 four stars: "Aside from a few relatively minor gripes, this issue is full of energy, particularly strong character work and wonderful attention to the surrounding environments". Logsdon gave it an 8.3: "This title continues to be full of entertaining action scenes, which are ably aided by Tony Daniel. There is so much action to cram into this book, and Daniel manages to be both epic and economic with every page. He continues to produce arguably the finest work of his career, and the results are an undeniable pleasure to see".

McElhatton of CBR gave issue #7 three stars in his review: "Superman/Wonder Woman #7 has to juggle a lot here, and the end result makes the book a tiny bit uneven. It has to check off a lot of different boxes, and the end result is a comic that feels like it could be sliced into three different collections down the line. Each piece works well, but the three parts don't mesh together quite as much as they otherwise could". Katzman of Comic Vine gave it three stars, commenting that Superman/Wonder Woman #7 will likely serve as a better read when it's collected in a trade or you have immediate access to the next issue. Because, just like it says on the cover, it's a prelude to the upcoming story Doomed. There's a little bit of emotional follow-up to the nuclear incident and it's nice to see these two out of their element, even if it's just for a little bit. But for the most part, this issue establishes a lot of questions and now it's just a matter of time to see how it's all handled". Logsdon gave it a 7.5: "Doomsday steals what could have been an otherwise great conclusion to Superman Wonder Woman #7".

=== "Superman: Doomed" ===
Professional reviews
	CBR	Comic Vine	IGN
Issue	Rating		
8	—N/a	4/5 stars	—N/a
9	—N/a	—N/a	8.0/10
10	—N/a	4/5 stars	5.5/10

Katzman of Comic Vine gave issue #8 four stars: "While the opening of Doomed hit us with a massive slugfest, Soule's follow-up is purely character-driven and rightfully so. Instead of just having Superman act like a complete jerk and simply having some fun with it, Soule's able to tie this new mentality to the focus of this book: Kal-El's relationship with Wonder Woman".

Logsdon of IGN gave issue #9 an 8.0: "Superman/Wonder Woman #9 makes for a great addition to "Doomed" at the sacrifice of its main storyline".

Katzman of Comic Vine gave issue #10 four stars: "The focus on Clark and Diana's relationship feels a little forced and the need to appeal to new readers takes a wee bit of a toll, but despite that, Superman/Wonder Woman #10 still manages to be an interesting and entertaining addition to the Superman: Doomed event". Logsdon of IGN gave it a 5.5: "Superman/Wonder Woman #10 almost completely loses its identity to Doomed, and the results aren't pretty".

== Collected editions ==
#	Title	Material collected	Pages	Publication date	ISBN
1	Power Couple	Superman/Wonder Woman #1–7	200	September 17, 2014	978-1401248987
2	War and Peace	Superman/Wonder Woman #8–12, Annual #1, The New 52: Futures End #1, Wonder Woman: Futures End #1	224	March 24, 2015	978-1401253479
3	Casualties of War	Superman/Wonder Woman #13–17	168	November 24, 2015	978-1401257682
4	Dark Truth	Superman/Wonder Woman #18–24	200	June 14, 2016	978-1401263225
5	A Savage End	Superman/Wonder Woman #25–31, Annual #2	208	December 13, 2016	978-1401265458
