= Tom King (writer) =

American author and comic book writer

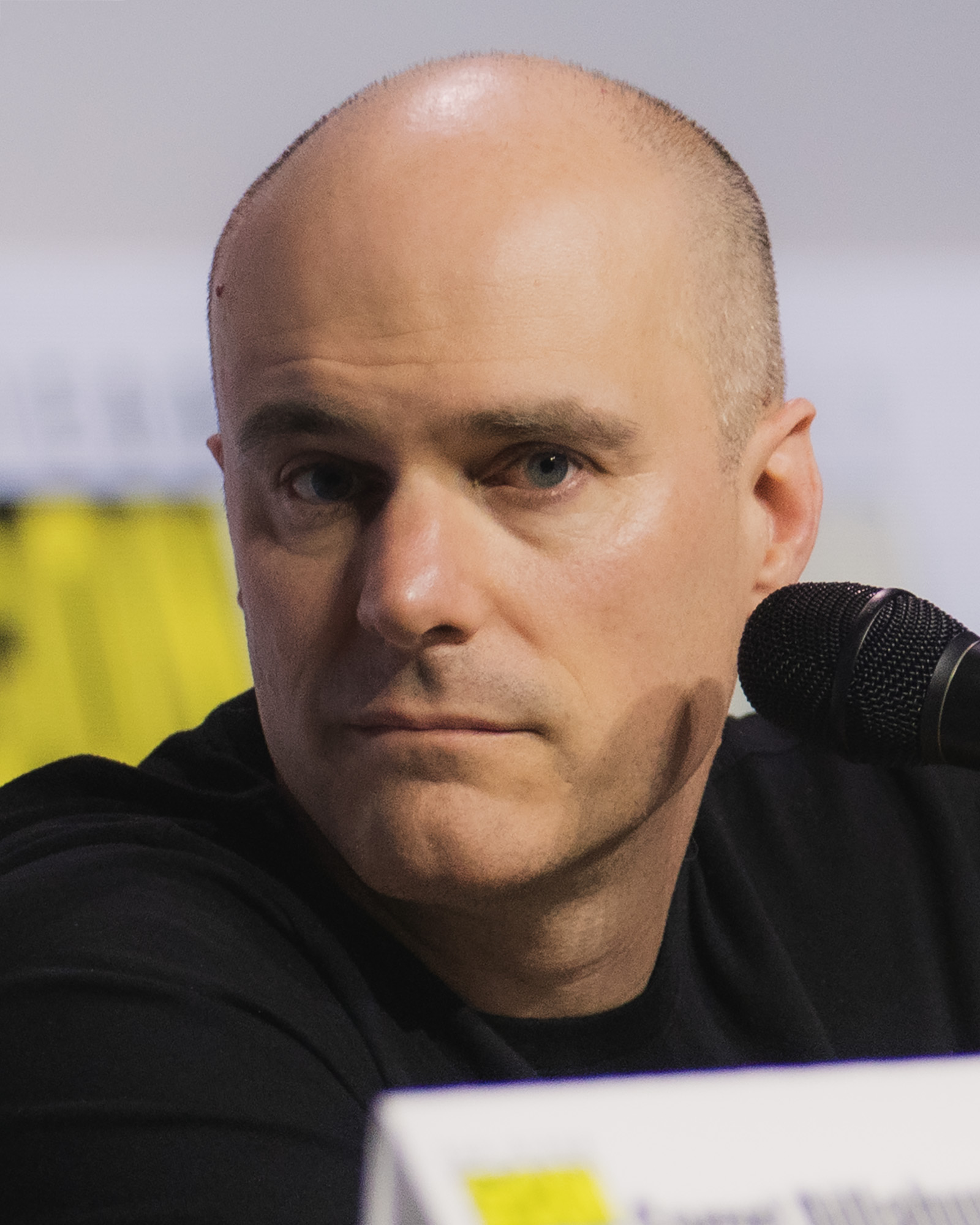
- King in 2026
- Born: July 15, 1978 (age 48)
- Notable works: The Vision; Batman; Mister Miracle; The Sheriff of Babylon; Human Target; Strange Adventures; Supergirl: Woman of Tomorrow; Wonder Woman
- Awards: Eisner Award for Best Writer

Thomas Krieger King (born July 15, 1978) is an American author and comic book writer. He is best known for the comic books The Vision for Marvel Comics, The Sheriff of Babylon for the DC Comics imprint Vertigo, and Batman, Mister Miracle, Supergirl: Woman of Tomorrow, and Wonder Woman for DC Comics.

In 2018, King received the Eisner Award for Best Writer for his work on Batman and Mister Miracle, sharing the award with Marjorie Liu.

In January 2023, King was announced to be a member of DC Studios's writers' room for its DC Universe media franchise of films and television. In this franchise, King's Supergirl: Woman of Tomorrow miniseries was adapted into the film Supergirl (2026), while King co-created the HBO series Lanterns.

== Early life ==
King primarily grew up in Southern California. His mother worked in the film industry, which inspired his love of storytelling. He interned at both DC and Marvel Comics during the late 1990s. He studied both philosophy and history at Columbia University, graduating in 2000. He identifies as "half-Jewish, half-Midwestern".

== Career ==
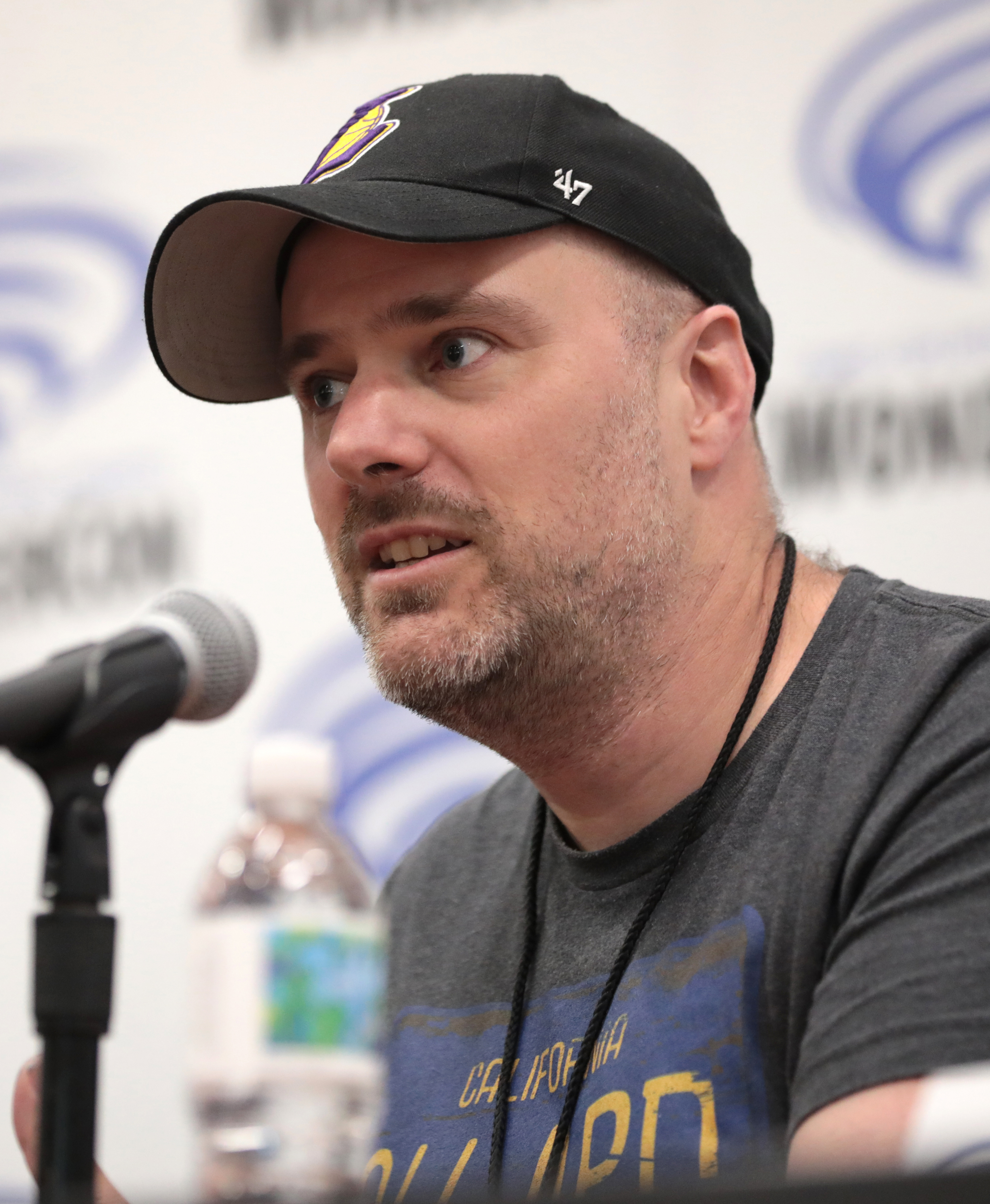
King at the 2023 WonderCon

=== CIA career ===
King joined the CIA after the September 11 terrorist attacks and worked with the group that planned the 2003 Iraq war.

King spent seven years as a counterterrorism operations officer for the CIA before quitting to write his debut novel, A Once Crowded Sky, after the birth of his first child.

=== Writing career ===
King interned both at DC Comics and Marvel Comics, where he was an assistant to X-Men writer Chris Claremont, before joining the CIA counterterrorism unit after 9/11.

A Once Crowded Sky, King's debut superhero novel with comics pages illustrated by Tom Fowler, was published on July 10, 2012, by Touchstone, an imprint of Simon & Schuster, to positive reception.

In 2014, King was chosen to co-write Grayson for DC Comics, along with Tim Seeley and Mikel Janin on art. After penning Nightwing No. 30, King, Seeley, and Janin launched Grayson in May 2014, featuring Dick Grayson leaving behind his Nightwing persona at age 22 to become Agent 37, a Spyral spy. King and Seeley plotted the series together and traded issues to script separately, with King providing additional authenticity through his background with the CIA.

A relaunch of classic DC Comics series The Omega Men was published in June 2015 by King and debut artist Barnaby Bagenda, as part of the publisher's relaunch DC You. The series follows a group of rebels fighting an oppressive galactic empire, and feature White Lantern Kyle Rayner. The Omega Men, created in 1981, are DC's cosmic equivalent to Marvel's Guardians of the Galaxy, though significantly more obscure. King's and Bagenda's use of the nine-panel grid, popularized by Alan Moore's and Dave Gibbons' Watchmen, has been praised by reviewers.

In San Diego Comic-Con 2015, Vertigo revealed a new creator-owned project written by King with art by Mitch Gerads titled The Sheriff of Baghdad. The project, a crime series in the vein of Vertigo titles like Preacher and Scalped, was set to launch in late 2015, and was inspired by King's time in Iraq as part of the CIA. Initially an eight-issue miniseries, it was later re-titled The Sheriff of Babylon and expanded into an ongoing series. The first issue launched in December 2015 to critical acclaim, with reviewers praising its "deeply personal" storytelling and the "intriguing" and "captivating" personalities of its characters. That same year, DC announced "Robin War", a crossover storyline set for December that would run for five weeks through titles Grayson, Detective Comics, We Are Robin, and Robin: Son of Batman; King was set to orchestrate the crossover's story-line and pen two one-shots to open and close the series.

As part of Marvel Comics' All-New, All-Different relaunch, King was announced as the writer of The Vision, a new ongoing following the titular character and his newly created family, with artist Gabriel Hernández Walta, colorist Jordie Bellaire, and covers by Mike del Mundo, launching in November 2015. The Vision has been well received by the public, with reviewers calling the series one of Marvel's "biggest surprises" and praising the narration, art, and colors.

In September 2015, DC cancelled King's The Omega Men, along with four other titles, with the series ending with issue seven. After negative fan response to the cancellation, Jim Lee, DC's co-publisher, announced that they would be bringing back The Omega Men through at least issue 12. Lee described the decision to cancel the series as "a bit hasty," crediting the book's critical acclaim and fan social media reactions as the reason the title would go on for the planned 12-issue run.

King penned a Green Lantern one-shot that ties into the "Darkseid War" storyline, titled "Will You Be My God?", which James Whitbrook of io9 praised as "one of the best" Green Lantern stories.

King and co-writer Tim Seeley announced they would leave Grayson after issue No. 18, with King clarifying on Twitter that they were working on something "big and cool" and needed time. King and Seeley officially left the series in February with issue No. 17, with Jackson Lanzing and Collin Kelly taking over for its last three issues with issue No. 18 in March.

DC Comics announced in February 2016 that King had signed an exclusivity deal with the publisher, which would see him writing exclusively for DC and Vertigo. King revealed via his Twitter account that he would stay on The Vision as writer through issue 12, finishing the story arc he had planned from the beginning.

In March 2016, it was announced that King would be writing the main bi-weekly Batman series beginning with a new No. 1, replacing long-time writer Scott Snyder, as part of DC's Rebirth relaunch that June. King has stated that his run would be 100 issues total, with the entirety being released twice-monthly, though this was later curtailed to 85 issues and 3 annuals, with a 12 issue followup maxiseries Batman/Catwoman to finish the story.. This added up to 100 installments.

In August 2017, King and regular collaborator Mitch Gerads launched the first issue of their Mister Miracle series, with a planned total run of twelve issues. In June 2018 DC Comics announced King would be writing Heroes in Crisis, a limited series centering around a concept he introduced in Batman.

In July 2018, he received the Eisner Award for Best Writer for his work on Batman, Batman Annual #2, Batman/Elmer Fudd Special #1 and Mister Miracle, sharing the award with Marjorie Liu.

In May and June 2019, King, Jim Lee, and CW series actresses Nafessa Williams, Candice Patton, and Danielle Panabaker toured five U.S. military bases in Kuwait with the United Service Organizations (USO), where they visited the approximately 12,000 U.S. military personnel stationed in that country as part of DC's 80th anniversary of Batman celebration.

In September 2020, DC Comics announced that King would be among the creators of a revived Batman: Black and White anthology series to debut on December 8, 2020. From 2021 to 2022, King was the writer on the eight-issue miniseries Supergirl: Woman of Tomorrow with artist Bilquis Evely. David Harth, for CBR, commented that since Omega Men, "King has mostly stayed away from sci-fi, going for a more psychological take on superheroes instead". Harth highlighted that Supergirl: Woman of Tomorrow "is very much a sci-fi epic" and that the series is "even more imaginative than Omega Men's sci-fi, as it has King flexing his muscles in different ways".

In November 2022, it was announced that King would be writing both Batman: The Brave and the Bold and The Penguin, as a part of the 2023 relaunch Dawn of DC.

In January 2023, it was announced that King's Supergirl: Woman of Tomorrow miniseries would be adapted into a feature film by DC Studios. It was also announced by DC Studios co-chairman and co-CEO James Gunn that King would serve as one of the architects of the new DC Universe media franchise of feature films and other media that would succeed the DC Extended Universe.

In March 2023, it was announced that King would be writing the new Wonder Woman relaunch as a part of Dawn of DC.

In July 2023, it was announced that King would work on a new creator-owned series for Boom! Studios, with Peter Gross serving as the illustrator. The series would later be revealed to be Animal Pound, a modern reimagining of George Orwell's Animal Farm set in an animal shelter.

In May 2024, it was announced that King would be a writer and executive producer of the television series Lanterns for DC Studios alongside Damon Lindelof and Chris Mundy. In June 2024, HBO gave an eight-episode, straight-to-series order to the series. Per the official logline, the series follows "new recruit John Stewart and Lantern legend Hal Jordan, two intergalactic cops drawn into a dark, earth-based mystery as they investigate a murder in the American heartland."

In June 2025, during the Annecy International Animation Film Festival, it was announced that an adult animated series based on King and Gerads' Mister Miracle miniseries was greenlit, with King serving as executive producer and showrunner.

In August 2025, it was announced that King would pen the screenplay to a film based on Archie Comics for Universal Pictures, with Phil Lord and Christopher Miller serving as producers.

== Personal life ==
As of 2016, King lives in Washington, D.C., with his wife and three children, Charlie, Claire, and Crosby.

== Bibliography ==
=== Novels ===
- A Once Crowded Sky (with illustrations by Tom Fowler, 336 pages, Touchstone, 2012, ISBN 1-4516-5200-3)

=== DC Comics ===
- Time Warp: "It's Full of Demons" (with Tom Fowler, anthology one-shot, Vertigo, 2013)
- Nightwing:
  - Nightwing vol. 3 #30: "Setting Son" (co-written by King and Tim Seeley, art by Javier Garrón, Jorge Lucas and Mikel Janín, 2014)
    - Collected in Nightwing: Setting Son (tpb, 200 pages, 2014, ISBN 1-4012-5011-4)
  - Grayson #1-17 (co-written with Tim Seeley, art by Mikel Janín, Stephen Mooney (#7, 14, Annual No. 1, Futures End one-shot), Álvaro Martínez (Annual #2), 2014–2016) collected as:
    - Agents of Spyral (collects #1–4 and the Grayson: Futures End one-shot, hc, 160 pages, 2015, ISBN 1-4012-5234-6; tpb, 2016, ISBN 1-4012-5759-3)
      - Includes "The Candidate" short story (co-written by King and Tim Seeley, art by Stephen Mooney) from Secret Origins vol. 3 No. 8 (anthology, 2015)
    - We All Die at Dawn (collects #5–8 and Annual No. 1, tpb, 160 pages, 2016, ISBN 1-4012-5760-7)
    - Nemesis (collects the DC Sneak Peek: Grayson digital one-shot, #9–12 and Annual No. 2, tpb, 160 pages, 2016, ISBN 1-4012-6276-7)
    - A Ghost in the Tomb (collects #13–17, tpb, 184 pages, 2016, ISBN 1-4012-6762-9)
- Robin:
  - Robin War (hc, 256 pages, 2016, ISBN 1-4012-6208-2; tpb, 2017, ISBN 1-4012-6811-0) includes:
    - "With the Greatest of Ease" (with Rob Haynes, Khary Randolph, Mauricet, Jorge Corona and Andres Guinaldo, in No. 1, 2016)
    - "The Daring Young Man" (with Carmine Di Giandomenico, Khary Randolph, Álvaro Martínez, and Scott McDaniel, in No. 2, 2016)
  - Robin: 80th Anniversary 100-Page Super Spectacular: "The Lesson Plan" (co-written by King and Tim Seeley, art by Mikel Janín, anthology one-shot, 2020)
- Batman:
  - Batman vol. 3 (with David Finch, Mikel Janín, Riley Rossmo (#7–8), Mitch Gerads (#14–15, 23, 62, 75 and 81), Jason Fabok (#21–22), Clay Mann (#24, 27, 30, 36–37 and 78–79), Joëlle Jones (#33–35, 39–40 and 44), Travis Moore (#38 and 61), Tony Daniel (#45–47, 55–57 and 75–77), Lee Weeks (#51–53, 67 and Annual #2), Matt Wagner (#54), Jorge Fornés (#60, 66–67, 70–72, 84 and Annual #4), Amanda Conner (#68), Yanick Paquette (#69) and John Romita, Jr. (#80–81); the Rebirth one-shot is co-written by King and Scott Snyder, 2016–2020).
    - Collected in Trade Paperbacks and Hardcovers as:
      - Batman Vol 1. I Am Gotham (collects Batman: Rebirth one-shot and #1–6; tpb, 192 pages, 2017, ISBN 1-4012-6777-7)
      - Batman: Night of the Monster Men (includes #7–8; hc, 144 pages, 2017, ISBN 1-4012-7067-0; tpb, 2017, ISBN 1-4012-7431-5)
        - Issues #7–8 are scripted by Steve Orlando from a plot by King and Orlando.
      - Batman Vol 2: I Am Suicide (collects #9–15; tpb, 168 pages, 2017, ISBN 1-4012-6854-4)
      - Batman Vol 3: I Am Bane (collects #16–20, 23–24 and Annual No. 1; tpb, 176 pages, 2017, ISBN 1-4012-7131-6)
      - Batman/The Flash: The Button (includes #21–22; hc, 104 pages, 2017, ISBN 1-4012-7644-X; tpb, 2019, ISBN 1-4012-9429-4)
        - Issue No. 22 is scripted by Joshua Williamson from a plot by King and Williamson.
      - Batman Vol 4: The War of Jokes and Riddles (collects #25–32; tpb, 200 pages, 2017, ISBN 1-4012-7361-0)
      - Batman Vol 5: The Rules of Engagement (collects #33–37 and Annual No. 2; tpb, 160 pages, 2018, ISBN 1-4012-7731-4)
      - Batman Vol 6: Bride or Burglar? (collects #38–44; tpb, 168 pages, 2018, ISBN 1-4012-8027-7)
      - Batman Vol 7: The Wedding (collects #45–50; tpb, 176 pages, 2018, ISBN 1-4012-8338-1)
        - Includes "Your Big Day" short story (art by Clay Mann) from DC Nation (one-shot, 2018)
      - Batman Vol 8: Cold Days (collects #51–57; tpb, 176 pages, 2018, ISBN 1-4012-8352-7)
      - Batman Vol 9: The Tyrant Wing (collects #58–60; tpb, 152 pages, 2019, ISBN 1-4012-8844-8)
        - Includes "True Strength" short story (art by Mikel Janín) from Batman Secret Files No. 1 (anthology, 2018)
      - Batman Vol 10: Knightmares (collects #61–63 and 66–69; tpb, 176 pages, 2019, ISBN 1-77950-158-7)
      - Batman Vol 11: The Fall and the Fallen (collects #70–74; tpb, 144 pages, 2019, ISBN 1-77950-160-9)
      - Batman Vol 12: City of Bane Part 1 (collects #75–79; hc, 176 pages, April 2020)
      - Batman Vol 13: City of Bane Part 2 (collects #80–85; and Batman Annual #4; hc, 220 pages, July 2020)
      - Batman: City of Bane – The Complete Collection (collects #75–85 and Annual No. 4; tpb, 344 pages, 2020, ISBN 1-77950-595-7)
      - Batman by Tom King Book 1 (collects Batman: Rebirth one-shot, #1-6 and 9-22, The Flash #21-22, and Batman/Elmer Fudd Special #1, tpb, 560 pages, 2024)
    - Collected in Oversized Hardcovers as:
      - Batman: The Rebirth Deluxe Edition – Book 1 (collects Batman: Rebirth one-shot and #1–15; ohc, 379 pages, August 2017)
      - Batman: The Rebirth Deluxe Edition – Book 2 (collects #16–32 and Batman Annual #1; ohc, 428 pages, June 2018)
      - Batman: The Rebirth Deluxe Edition – Book 3 (collects #33–44 and Batman Annual #2; ohc, 311 pages, December 2018)
      - Batman: The Deluxe Edition – Book 4 (collects #45–57 and a story from DC Nation #0; ohc, 339 pages, July 2019)
      - Batman: The Deluxe Edition – Book 5 (collects #58–69; ohc, 278 pages, July 2020)
      - Batman: The Deluxe Edition – Book 6 (collects #70–85 and Batman Annual #4 and Batman: Secret Files #2; ohc, 379 pages, July 2022)
      - Batman by Tom King and Lee Weeks: Deluxe Edition (Collects #51–53, #67, Batman Annual #2, and Batman/Elmer Fudd Special #1, ohc, 184 pages, November 2020)
  - Batman/Elmer Fudd Special (with Lee Weeks and Byron Vaughns, 2017) collected in.
    - DC Meets Looney Tunes (tpb, 248 pages, 2018, ISBN 1-4012-7757-8)
    - Batman/Elmer Fudd: The Deluxe Edition (92 pages; hc, 2025).
  - Detective Comics:
    - Batman: 80 Years of the Bat Family (tpb, 400 pages, 2020, ISBN 1-77950-658-9) includes:
      - "Batman's Greatest Case" (with Tony Daniel and Joëlle Jones, co-feature in #1000, 2019)
    - "Legacy" (with Walter Simonson, co-feature in #1027, 2020)
  - Catwoman: 80th Anniversary 100-Page Super Spectacular: "Helena" (with Mikel Janín, anthology one-shot, 2020)
  - Batman: Black and White vol. 3 #2: "The Unjust Judge" (with Mitch Gerads, anthology, 2021). Collected in.
    - Batman: Black and White (hc, 312 pages, 2021, ISBN 1-77951-196-5; tpb, 2022, ISBN 1-77951-057-8)
  - Batman: Killing Time #1–6 (with David Marquez, 2022). Collected As.
    - Batman: Killing Time (hc, 208 pages, 2022, ISBN 1-77951-698-3)
  - Gotham City: Year One #1–6 (with Phil Hester, 2022–2023). Collected As.
    - Gotham City: Year One (collects #1–6; hc, 208 pages, September 2023)
  - Batman: One Bad Day – The Riddler #1 (with Mitch Gerads, 64 pages, August 16, 2022). Collected As.
    - Batman: One Bad Day – The Riddler (hc, 88 pages, June 2023)
  - Batman #126: "The Endless Line" (A Tribute to Neal Adams), with Josh Adams (3 pages, July 2022)
    - included in several comics published by DC that month
  - Batman: The Brave and the Bold #1–2, #5, #9: "The Winning Card" (with Mitch Gerads, 2023–2024). Collected As.
    - Batman: The Brave and the Bold Vol. 1: The Winning Card (tpb, 112 pages, April 2024)
- Vertigo Quarterly: CMYK #4: "Black Death in America" (with John Paul Leon, anthology, 2015) collected in.
  - CMYK (tpb, 296 pages, 2015, ISBN 1-4012-5336-9)
- The Omega Men vol. 3 #1–12 (with Barnaby Bagenda and Toby Cypress (#4), 2015–2016) & DC Sneak Peek: The Omega Men (with Barnaby Bagenda, digital one-shot, 2015). Collected As.
  - The Omega Men: The End is Here (collects #1–12, 296 pages, tpb, 2016, ISBN 1-4012-6153-1)
  - The Omega Men By Tom King: The Deluxe Edition (collects #1–12, 320 pages, ohc, 2020, ISBN 1-4012-9992-X)
- Teen Titans vol. 5 Annual #1: "The Source of Mercy" (co-written by King and Will Pfeifer, art by Alisson Borges and Wes St. Claire, 2015). Collected in.
  - Teen Titans: Rogue Targets (tpb, 192 pages, 2016, ISBN 1-4012-6162-0)
- Justice League: Darkseid War — Green Lantern: "Will You be My God?" (with Evan Shaner, one-shot, 2016). Collected In.
  - Justice League: Power of the Gods (hc, 200 pages, 2016, ISBN 1-4012-6149-3; tpb, 2016, ISBN 1-4012-6524-3)
- Mister Miracle vol. 4 #1–12 (with Mitch Gerads, 2017–2019). Collected As.
  - Mister Miracle (collects #1–12, 320 pages; tpb, 2019, ISBN 1-4012-8354-3; hc, 320 pages, 2020, ISBN 1-4012-9881-8)
  - Mister Miracle: The Deluxe Edition (collects #1–12; hc, 376 pages, 2020 ISBN 1-77950-557-4)
  - Absolute Mister Miracle by Tom King and Mitch Gerads (collects #1–12, 440 pages; hc, 2024)
- The Kamandi Challenge #9: "Ain't It a Drag?" (with Kevin Eastman, 2017). Collected in.
  - The Kamandi Challenge (hc, 360 pages, 2018, ISBN 1-4012-7836-1; tpb, 2019, ISBN 1-4012-8912-6)
- DC Universe Holiday Special 2017: "Going Down Easy" (with Francesco Francavilla, co-feature, 2017). Collected in.
  - A Very DC Rebirth Holiday Sequel (tpb, 176 pages, 2018, ISBN 1-4012-8496-5)
- Swamp Thing Winter Special: "The Talk of the Saints" (with Jason Fabok, co-feature, 2018). Collected in.
  - Swamp Thing: Roots of Terror (hc, 168 pages, 2019, ISBN 1-4012-9587-8)
  - Swamp Thing: Tales from the Bayou (tpb, 168 pages, 2020, ISBN 1-77950-115-3)
- Superman:
  - Action Comics #1000: "Of Tomorrow" (with Clay Mann, co-feature, 2018)
  - DC 100-Page Comic Giant: Superman #3–10, 12–15: "Up in the Sky" (with Andy Kubert, anthology, 2018–2019). Reprinted as a regular-sized 6-issue limited series under the title Superman: Up in the Sky (2019–2020). Collected As.
    - Superman: Up in the Sky (collects #1-6, 176 pages; hc, 2020, ISBN 1-4012-9456-1; tpb, 2021, ISBN 1-77950-597-3)
    - Superman: Up in the Sky: The Deluxe Edition (collects #1-6, 192 pages; hc)
  - Superman: Red and Blue #6: "The Special" (with Paolo Rivera, anthology, 2021). Collected in.
    - Superman: Red and Blue (hc, 272 pages, 2021, ISBN 1-77951-280-5; tpb, 2022, ISBN 1-77951-747-5)
- Heroes in Crisis #1–9 (with Clay Mann, Lee Weeks (#3) and Mitch Gerads (#6 and 8), 2018–2019). Collected As.
  - Heroes in Crisis (collects #1–9, 248 pages; hc, 2019, ISBN 1-4012-9142-2; tpb, 2020, ISBN 1-77950-303-2)
- Supergirl: Woman of Tomorrow #1–8 (with Bilquis Evely, 2021–2022). Collected As.
  - Supergirl: Woman of Tomorrow (tpb, 224 pages, 2022, ISBN 1-77951-568-5)
  - Supergirl: Woman of Tomorrow: The Deluxe Edition (hc, 256 pages, 2024)
- The Penguin #1–12 (with Stefano Gaudiano, 2023 – 2024). Collected As.
  - The Penguin Vol. 1: The Prodigal Bird (collects #0–7, 156 pages; tpb, 2024, ISBN 1-77952-524-9)
  - The Penguin Vol. 2: (collects #8–12, 176 pages; tpb, 2025)
- Wonder Woman
  - Wonder Woman: 80th Anniversary 100-Page Super Spectacular: "Dated" (with Evan Shaner, anthology one-shot, 2021)
  - Wonder Woman vol. 6 #1–28, #30–34, #37–40 (with Daniel Sampere, 2023 – 2026). Collected as
    - Wonder Woman Vol. 1: Outlaw (collects #1–6, 164 pages; tpb, July 2024, ISBN 1-77952-545-1)
    - Wonder Woman Vol. 2: Sacrifice (collects #7–13, 192 pages; tpb, November 2024)
    - Wonder Woman Vol. 3: Fury (collects #14-19, 176 pages; tpb, May 2025)
    - Wonder Woman Vol. 4: The Island of Mice and Men (collects #22-28, 232 pages; tpb, May 2026)
    - Wonder Woman Vol. 5: The Wonder War Act I (collects #31-36, 152 pages; tpb, November 2026)
- Black Canary: Best of the Best #1–6 (with Ryan Sook, November 2024 – Present)

==== DC Black Label ====
- The Sheriff of Babylon #1–12 (with Mitch Gerads, Vertigo, 2016–2017), Reprinted under DC Black Label. Collected As.
  - The Sheriff of Babylon (collects #1–12, 304 pages; hc, 2018, ISBN 1-4012-7791-8; tpb, 2021, ISBN 1-77950-913-8)
- Strange Adventures vol. 5 #1–12 (with Evan Shaner and Mitch Gerads, March 2020 – October 2021). Collected as.
  - Strange Adventures (hc, 376 pages, 2021, ISBN 1-77951-203-1; tpb, 2022, ISBN 1-77951-746-7)
  - Strange Adventures: The Deluxe Edition (hc, 448 pages, 2024)
- Rorschach #1–12 (with Jorge Fornés, DC Black Label, October 2020 – September 2021). Collected as.
  - Rorschach (hc, 304 pages, 2021, ISBN 1-77951-203-1; tpb, 2022, ISBN 1-77951-748-3
- Batman/Catwoman #1–12, (with Clay Mann and Liam Sharp (#7–9), December 2020 – June 2022) and Batman/Catwoman Special (with John Paul Leon, Bernard Chang and Mitch Gerads, January 2022). Collected as.
  - Batman/Catwoman (collects #1–12, Batman Annual #2 and Batman/Catwoman Special, 424 pages; hc, December 2022; tpb, February 2025)
- Human Target vol. 4 #1–12 (with Greg Smallwood, November 2022 – February 2023). Collected as.
  - Human Target Book 1 (collects #1–6; hc, September 2022; tpb, October 2023).
  - Human Target Book 2 (collects #6–12; hc, July 2023; tpb, July 2024)
- Danger Street #1–12 (with Jorge Fornés, December 2022 – December 2023). Collected as.
  - Danger Street Book 1 (collects #1–6, 198 pages; tp, November 2023)
  - Danger Street Book 2 (collects #7–12, 184 pages; tp, May 2024)
- Jenny Sparks #1–7 (with Jeff Spokes, August 2024 – April 2025). Collected as.
  - Jenny Sparks: Be Better (collects #1–7, 216 pages; tpb, May 2025)

=== Other publishers ===
- The Vision vol. 2 #1–12 (with Gabriel Hernández Walta and Michael Walsh (#7), Marvel, 2016) collected as:
  - Little Worse than a Man (collects #1–6, tpb, 136 pages, 2016, ISBN 0-7851-9657-9)
  - Little Better than a Beast (collects #7–12, tpb, 136 pages, 2016, ISBN 0-7851-9658-7)
  - The Complete Collection (collects #1–12, hc, 488 pages, 2018, ISBN 1-302-90853-7; tpb, 288 pages, 2019, ISBN 1-302-92055-3)
- Love is Love: "I'm Tired" (with Mitch Gerads, anthology graphic novel, 144 pages, IDW Publishing, 2016, ISBN 1-63140-939-5)
- Love Everlasting #1– (with Elsa Charretier, Image Comics, 2022–Present). Collected as.
  - Love Everlasting Volume 1 (collects #1–5; tpb, 136 pages, 2023, ISBN 1-5343-2464-X)
  - Love Everlasting Volume 2 (collects #6–10; tpb, 136 pages, 2024, ISBN 1-5343-9848-1)
  - Love Everlasting Volume 3 (collects #11–15; tpb, 136 pages, 2025, ISBN 9781534330702)
- Animal Pound #1–5 (with Peter Gross, Boom! Studios, 2024)
- Helen of Wyndhorn #1–6 (with Bilquis Evely, Dark Horse Comics, 2024)

== Filmography ==
=== Television ===
Year	Title	Creator	Writer	Executive Producer	Notes	Ref.
2026	Lanterns	Yes	Yes	Yes	Writer (3 episodes); Executive producer (8 episodes)	
TBA	Mister Miracle	Yes	Yes	Yes	Writer (8 episodes); Executive producer/showrunner (8 episodes)	

Preceded by Kyle Higgins	Nightwing writer 2014 (with Tim Seeley)	Succeeded by Tim Seeley
Preceded by Scott Snyder	Batman writer 2016–2019	Succeeded by James Tynion IV
Preceded by Becky Cloonan & Michael W. Conrad	Wonder Woman writer 2023–2026	Succeeded by Stephanie Williams
