= Love Everlasting (comics) =

American psychological horror and romance comic series

Publication information
- Publisher: Image Comics
- Genre: Psychological horror, romance
- Publication date: August 2022
- No. of issues: 15

Creative team
- Written by: Tom King
- Artist: Elsa Charretier

Love Everlasting is an American psychological horror and romance comic series published by Image Comics. It is written by Tom King and illustrated by Elsa Charretier.

== Synopsis ==
Joan Peterson discovers that she is thrust into a new romantic tale every time she and her romantic partner declare their eternal love for one another.

== Release ==
King and Charretier first published the comic online in January 2022. The series was picked up by Image Comics that May.

== Film Adaptation ==
In April 2025, it was announced that a film adaptation of the comic was in development at Sony Pictures, with Lenny Abrahamson directing, Jane Goldman penning the screenplay, and Emma Watts and Ed Guiney producing.

== Reception ==
On Comic Book Roundup, the series received an average score of 8.8 out of 10 based on 50 reviews.

Comic Book Resources included the series at number 1 on its "10 Best Image Comics Of 2023" list, writing, "Writer Tom King has created a meaningful and emotional commentary on cultural romantic stereotypes and traditional gender roles, exploring how those traditions limit women’s potential and keep their lives smaller than they might otherwise be."
