= The Sheriff of Babylon =

American comic book limited series

- Cover to The Sheriff of Babylon #1
- Date: 2015–2017
- Publisher: Vertigo

Creative team
- Writers: Tom King
- Artists: Mitch Gerads

Original publication
- Issues: 12

The Sheriff of Babylon is a twelve-issue American comic book first published by Vertigo Comics in 2015. Sheriff was created by Tom King and Mitch Gerads.

== Plot ==
The story follows Chris Henry, a former San Diego police officer turned military consultant, as he attempts to solve the murder of one of his Iraqi police recruits.

== Background ==
The Sheriff of Babylon is based on King's experiences in Iraq while working as a counterintelligence officer for the Central Intelligence Agency in 2004.

== Publication history ==
Initially conceived as an eight-part mini-series named The Sheriff of Baghdad, Vertigo extended the comic's run and eventually compiled the work into two trade paperbacks:

- Bang. Bang. Bang. (collects #1–6, 160 pages, July 2016, ISBN 1-4012-6466-2)
- Pow. Pow. Pow. (collects #7–12, 160 pages, February 2017, ISBN 1-4012-6726-2)

== Critical reception ==
Sheriff has received nearly universal praise, including from Vulture, The Guardian, and GQ.
