= Elsa Charretier =

French comic book artist and writer

- Born: June 15, 1989 (age 37)
- Notable works: The Infinite Loop; The Unstoppable Wasp; Love Everlasting
- Partner: Pierrick Colinet

Elsa Charretier (born June 15, 1989) is a French comic book artist and writer. She has worked with Marvel Comics, DC Comics, Image Comics and IDW Publishing.

== Early life ==
Charretier grew up reading French comics, and drew as a child. She said in 2020, "My parents encouraged my high-energy and independent personality, but I think it's fair to say they were secretly worried: 'how in the hell is this kid going to find a job?!'"

== Career ==
Charretier made her U.S. debut with The Infinite Loop, a comic she co-created with Pierrick Colinet. In 2014, after French editors rejected it, Charretier and Colinet crowdfunded to publish the comic, raising $50,000. They used the remaining money to buy tickets to the New York Comic Con, where it was eventually accepted by IDW Publishing.

Charretier later drew the art for the graphic novel adaptation of George R. R. Martin's novel Windhaven. She has worked on comics such as The Unstoppable Wasp, Star Wars Adventures and Harley Quinn.

In 2019, Charretier and Matt Fraction co-created November, a graphic novella crime series, for Image Comics. In 2022, Charretier and writer Tom King co-created Love Everlasting, a psychological horror and romance comic series, which is also published by Image Comics.

Charretier illustrated the storyboards for Room Service, a horror short film she is making together with Colinet and James Tynion IV. The project began a Kickstarter campaign in October 2022.

== Influences ==
Charretier has cited Batman: The Animated Series and Watchmen as influences. She has drawn inspiration from comic creators such as Tim Sale, Darwyn Cooke and Bruce Timm.

== Personal life ==
Charretier is a feminist. She has worked with her boyfriend, writer Pierrick Colinet, on several comics.
