= Darkseid War =

DC Comics limited series

"Darkseid War" thematic stories
- Cover for Darkseid War #1, art by Jason Fabok.

Publication information
- Publisher: DC Comics
- Formats: Limited series
- Genre: Superhero
- Publication date: April 2015 – May 2016
- Number of issues: 18 (11 main issues, 7 tie-ins)
- Main character(s): Darkseid; Grail; Justice League; Anti-Monitor; Crime Syndicate of America; Steve Trevor

Creative team
- Writer(s): Geoff Johns
- Artist(s): Jason Fabok
- Penciller(s): Gary Frank
- Letterer(s): Rob Leigh
- Colorist(s): Brad Anderson; Alex Sinclair
- Editor(s): Brian Cunningham; Amedeo Turturro

"Justice League: The Darkseid War" is a 2015–2016 superhero comic book crossover storyline published by DC Comics, consisting of a central, eponymous miniseries by writer Geoff Johns and artists Gary Frank and Jason Fabok, and numerous tie-in books by various other creative teams. It is the final storyline to feature the Justice League in the 2011 New 52 continuity, until DC transitioned to the continuity of DC Rebirth. The plot involves the fulfilment of a prophecy in which the Justice League are embroiled in a war between Darkseid and the Anti-Monitor, and learns that someone else has engineered these events for their own purposes. The storyline received critical acclaim for the engaging plot, the action, and the art of Jason Fabok.

== Plot summary ==
=== Prologue ===
The dark secret of existence is that history has been destroyed and reborn over and over, in an endless repetition. As far as Metron is concerned, this is a cycle that must end. Metron is a New God who observed the events depicted in the "Crisis on Infinite Earths", "Infinite Crisis", and "Flashpoint", storylines. Metron is observing the DC Universe when he meets the Anti-Monitor.

The Anti-Monitor states that he is not going to destroy reality. Metron reminds that he has already begun, weakening reality to the point that even now, Brainiac is set on the path of causing a convergence of timelines. Metron offers a pact between the two of them. He promises that if the Anti-Monitor ceases his attempts to destroy reality, he will give up observing, and put every effort into restoring the Anti-Monitor to what he once was. Coldly, the Anti-Monitor responds that Metron does not have the power to do that, but he already knows who does. He intends to break the cycle of destruction on his own. Metron warns that if Mobius/Anti-Monitor seeks this path, he will face the wrath of Darkseid. Unexpectedly, Omega Beams destroy the Mobius chair, and the Anti-Monitor warns that he wants war with Darkseid, as his death is the key, and that Metron will bear witness to the end of the age of the New Gods. The age of the Anti-God will soon begin.

Metron looks up, to find that the one who destroyed the Mobius chair is in fact Darkseid's daughter, Grail, who seeks to see him dead.

==== Act One ====
In the present day, Scott Free has heard rumors that Darkseid has found the Anti-Life Equation, and he hopes that by infiltrating Apokolips he can learn what his adoptive father plans to do with it. Whatever he learns, he will surely need the Justice League's help again.

The Justice League (Flash, Batman, Shazam, Cyborg, Steve Trevor and Wonder Woman) are currently on the scene of a Boom Tube opening, having been alerted by the tech in Cyborg's body. Tracking it leads to the house of a man and woman, who are now dead. While The Flash and Batman examine the crime scene using their unique investigative skills, Hal Jordan and Jessica Cruz work on isolating evidence on the dead husband upstairs. From DNA on a wine glass, Barry determines that whoever was drinking from it wasn't human. In the meantime, they are left to wonder where the non-human killer went. As Cyborg tries to determine that using ashes left behind by the Boom Tube, Shazam is troubled by the fact that, ostensibly being a kid, he has never seen a dead body before.

Cyborg soon learns that 44 women named Myrina Black were killed in the United States alone, and the League must protect them until they know what's happening. The Flash notes that Jessica is looking a bit uncomfortable, and wonders if she's alright when suddenly a woman with gray skin emerges from Barry's body, and lightly grazes his chest with a scythe, just enough to draw first blood. Following the Flash, she turns her attention to Batman where she cuts into his shoulder with her scythe, and again in his back, pinning him to the ground before spotting Cyborg, in whom she recognizes the power of the Mother Box, and demands that he give it to her.

As the woman begins tearing the technology from Cyborg's unconscious body, she is surprised when Shazam grabs her from behind sending electricity coursing through her body and then throws her into a nearby truck. In that moment of reprieve, Shazam is surprised to see that Victor's body appears to have been growing back, but it is a brief reprieve, as the woman thrusts her scythe through Shazam's gut. As he writhes in the woman's grip, Wonder Woman wraps her Lasso around the woman and demands to know who she is. On her unfortune, her lasso's power of truth doesn't appear to be working and the mystery woman fights back.

Meanwhile, Superman warns Lex Luthor that he still does not trust him, regardless of whether even Wonder Woman does. Lex has recently moved Neutron from an A.R.G.U.S. facility to LexCorp, claiming that he will receive better care there, despite the fact that Superman had earlier heard him threaten the would-be assassin's life. Lena Luthor reports to Lex and Superman that Wonder Woman's communications have gone down, and Lex insists on going to see what happened, preparing a Kryptonite-fueled Warsuit. He explains that Kryptonite is a valuable energy source that could power all of Metropolis, were it not for the fact that doing so would prevent Superman from being in the city. Superman responds that whatever Lex says about it, he is still convinced he is a common criminal and states that he will no longer be having any association with the Justice League. Angrily, Lex blasts him with his suit, responding that Superman is not the leader of the League, so it is not for him to decide. He is also put out that Superman would talk to him that way in front of his sister. Unexpectedly, Lena herself shoots Lex in the arm with a pistol, causing him to pass out. As Superman looks on with surprise, she responds that everyone hates Lex, even her.

From above the scene of the attack on the League, Green Lantern assigns Power Ring to do crowd control while he tries to distract the attacker. Green Lantern is beaten, and the mystery woman takes control of Jessica's power ring to summon the Anti-Monitor. Lena reveals that she is holding a Mother Box, and orders it to send Superman and Lex to their ends, in the name of Darkseid, the pair is sent to Apokolips.

Unable to withstand both Lashina and Kanto at once, Scott asks his own Mother Box to steal their coordinates, and evade them. He is surprised when it drops him at the feet of a huge griffin. Fortunately, its owner reminds it that Scott is not an enemy. Despite her knowing this, Scott does not recognize her. She reveals that she is Myrina Black, and she has spent decades planning a war to kill Darkseid. She offers him the opportunity to join her in that war while revealing the mystery woman that attacked the Justice League is her daughter Grail.

The League, meanwhile, has been defeated by Grail, who claims to be of Amazon blood. Having stolen the Ring of Volthoom from Power Ring, she called the Anti-Monitor to this world, and now Wonder Woman - the only among the League who is still fit to fight - steels herself for a war that has already begun. Grail welcomes her attack, but their battle is not to occur, as the Anti-Monitor slams his fist down into the Earth. In wonder, Diana asks just who he is. He responds that he is desperate, reaching out to destroy her. In that instance, a Boom Tube erupts, and Metron appears, admitting that while Grail plays the game well, he does too. In another instant, he is gone, and he has taken the League with him. Grail insists that she will get the trophies she seeks in killing the League, but the Anti-Monitor reminds her that she will only get them after she delivers her father to him. She assures him that her mother promised that the war they seek would come to pass.

Myrina Black explains to Mister Miracle that she is humanity's savior. She had once been the Amazons' chosen assassin until they abandoned the great mission they were given by the old gods. They were meant to save the world from war, and she has been doing so for a long time. While Queen Hippolyta had chosen to hide the Amazons away on Paradise Island, Myrina had refused to hide, knowing that the dark god would one day come to enslave all of the Earth's inhabitants.

In preparation for this day, she created a weapon against war by giving birth to Darkseid's own daughter. She sent Grail to traverse reality in search of a being with the power to kill Darkseid, and she found the Anti-Monitor. The war against Darkseid will now take place with Earth as its battleground. Incredulously shocked by Myrina's action, Scott realizes that billions of innocents will die. Unmoved, Myrina responds that war always comes at a cost - and Darkseid must die at any price. Scott's insistence that innocent lives are more important than her cause leads Myrina to turn on him. She thrusts her spear into his side. Emitting a bright light from his hand, Scott manages to blind her long enough to order his Mother Box to take him to friends.

Recovering, the League finds themselves at the feet of Metron and his Mobius Chair. Shazam recognizes their surroundings as the Rock of Eternity, and Metron explains that he brought them to it because it is hidden from the view of the New Gods. Green Lantern claims that Metron cannot be trusted, having dealt with him once in the past. Metron insists that he was only observing the attack on Oa, as he has observed the League save the world many times. This time, though, he states, there is no saving it. He warns the League to go to their loved ones, and then leave the Earth if they wish to survive. Wonder Woman reminds Metron that he should already know by observing them that they will not do that, she demands to know who the monster she saw was. Casually, Metron responds that this was the Anti-Monitor, but his story is forbidden to them. Frustratedly, she wraps her Lasso around him and asks to know how she can get the information she needs to stop the Anti-Monitor. Metron resists the Lasso's power, but her force of will causes him to let slip that the only way to get the answers to her questions is to take the Mobius Chair from him.

With that knowledge, Diana yanks Metron from his seat, and the unstable chair begins preparing to Boom away. Without hesitation, Batman sits on the chair to stop it from doing so, but the power that surges through him, as a result, is greater than expected. Finally, the surge calms, and Batman realizes that he can hear the answers to everything. Testing it, he asks who killed his parents. The answer is, as he already knows, Joe Chill. As another test, he asks the Joker's real name - but the answer he receives troubles him. Worriedly, Green Lantern points out that Batman can barely master a power ring, and the chair is surely worse. Diana asks if Batman is alright, and he responds assuredly that he is fine.

While fighting against Parademons in Apokolips, Lex Luthor realizes that the air is killing Superman, which is causing him to bleed. Hal Jordan is uneasy about Batman being in the Mobius Chair, but Batman assures him he's okay. Mister Miracle arrives in front of the heroes and tells them that he needs their help. The heroes (with the exception of Batman) confront Anti-Monitor and Grail once more when suddenly Darkseid and his army of Parademons as well as DeSaad, Kalibak, and Steppenwolf appear. Superman and Lex Luthor are confronted by Parademons, and Lex realizes that Superman needs to have his body recharged, and the fiery pits of Apokolips are the only thing that can recharge Superman, and Lex throws him in the pit. Just before Lex is killed, Superman arrives in a negative form, saying he should have killed him a long time ago.

Batman and Green Lantern go to the Crime Syndicate's world (since the villains have encountered Anti-Monitor in the past) to find it burning and destroyed. Green Lantern asks Batman if he's okay; Bruce says he's fine but insults Green Lantern by saying the power ring is the only special thing about him. Superman, corrupted by Apokolips, tells Lex Luthor that all those fights they had were him holding back, and knocks Lex out before leaving Apokolips. Grail blinds Kalibak, and Darkseid summons the Black Racer to heavily injure the Anti-Monitor. Green Lantern and Batman go to the center of the anti-matter universe and realize that Anti-Monitor is Mobius, the one who created the Mobius Chair. The Anti-Monitor uses the Anti-Life Equation to force the Flash to fuse with the Black Racer, and the fused Flash-Black Racer kills Darkseid.

==== Act Two: After Death ====
Having killed Darkseid, the Anti-Monitor cocoons himself in a shell of energy, and separates himself from the Anti-Life Equation, which is then obtained by Grail. Shortly afterward, he emerges from his shell changed into a more human-looking form, once again Mobius, but still possessing vast power and legions of Shadow Demons. With Darkseid gone, suddenly all the heroes become corrupt. The Flash-Black Racer returns to the team, saying he is the God of Death. Superman nearly beats Lex Luthor to death while proclaiming himself as the God of Strength. Shazam gets corrupted by the New Gods (who are angry at Darkseid's death) and he becomes the God of Gods, and leaves. Lex Luthor wanders around Apokolips, and falls in the fiery pits, becoming the God of Apokolips.

Wonder Woman seeks the Crime Syndicate's help, as they have dealt with the Anti-Monitor before, while Myrina Black meets up with Grail. Grail tells her mother that she was after the Anti-Life Equation, and becomes the Goddess of the Anti-Life.

==== Act Three: Gods of Justice ====
A corrupted Superman tries fighting Wonder Woman, while Mister Miracle finds an imprisoned Ultraman for his advice and help. Ultraman reveals he is weakened because he needs kryptonite, and Anti-monitor is planning to kill everyone. Jessica Cruz's power ring finally corrupts her and she turns into Power Ring. Wonder Woman calms Superman by reminding him who he is; Batman and Hal Jordan appear in front of them. Batman explains to Superman, that the Apokolips energy Superman absorbed is killing him by breaking down his cellular structure. Mister Miracle's wife Big Barda arrives and tells him that Power Ring just freed the rest of the imprisoned Crime Syndicate, including a pregnant Superwoman. Power Ring corrupts Cyborg, turning him into Grid (a sentient computer virus in a robot body made from Cyborg's old prosthetic parts). Owlman arrives and tells everyone they need to work together.

The Crime Syndicate and Justice League meet and Owlman explains they are only teaming up with the Justice League to take down Anti-Monitor. Owlman offers them a deal, if the Justice League creates a new body for Grid while letting Power Ring possess Jessica Cruz, they will help them. Wonder Woman reluctantly agrees, and Mister Miracle gives Ultraman kryptonite so he can regain his strength. Suddenly, they are attacked by the Anti-Monitor (who goes by Mobius), and Hal Jordan sends backup (an army of Green Lanterns that includes John Stewart, Kilowog, Kyle Rayner, and Guy Gardner) to take down Mobius. Wonder Woman, Superwoman, Ultraman, and Superman fight Mobius while Batman is knocked out of the Mobius Chair. During the chaos, Grail kidnaps Steve Trevor, and Mobius kills Ultraman. Superwoman says the baby is coming.

Lex Luthor arrives to help turn the tide in the battle. Batman, sitting in the Mobius Chair, tells Superman and Wonder Woman how to take down Mobius, and Superman releases the Apokoliptian energy on Mobius to wound him. Mobius gets back up, and attacks Lex Luthor, but before killing him Grail arrives with Myrina Black and a possessed Steve Trevor under the influence of the Anti-Life Equation. Grail orders Trevor to unleash a blast on Mobius, turning him into a skeleton, and telling Steve to attack the rest of the League.

Superwoman gives birth to a boy, while Superman and Lex Luthor try to defeat Steve Trevor. Grid tries to convince Superwoman and Owlman to leave, but Superwoman uses her baby's power to absorb the Apokoliptian energy of Superman and Lex Luthor. Superwoman plans to absorb everyone's powers so she can conquer the world, but Grail kills her and takes the baby. Grail uses the baby's power to absorb Shazam's Apokoliptian powers and split the Flash and Black Racer. It is revealed that Cyborg and Jessica Cruz are stuck in the realm of the Power Ring (due to Power Ring tricking Cyborg to turn him into Grid), and Cyborg hacks the power ring from the inside so the Power Ring steps in front of the Black Racer. The Black Racer kills the Power Ring, and leaves. The Justice League attacks Grail, but Grail uses the baby to take the Anti-Life Equation from Trevor, turning the baby into Darkseid.

Grail tells Darkseid to kill the Justice League, and Hal Jordan gives his Green Lantern ring to Batman, breaking him out of the Mobius Chair. Owlman and Grid take the Mobius Chair and disappear. Big Barda and Mister Miracle join the fight against Grail, and Myrina Black sides with the Justice League after realizing that Grail is corrupt just like Darkseid. Myrina explains that Grail is her and Darkseid's daughter, and Grail was supposed to kill Darkseid, not bring him back. Myrina and Wonder Woman fight Grail and Batman tells Wonder Woman the only way to defeat Grail is to separate the Anti-Life Equation from Darkseid. Grail kills her mother, and accidentally hits Darkseid, separating the Anti-Life Equation from him and defeating Darkseid.

==== Aftermath ====
Jessica Cruz is chosen to be the new Green Lantern after her sacrifice and is revived. Grail escapes with an infant Darkseid. Green Lantern asks Batman why was he so surprised about the Mobius chair answering his Joker question, and Batman reveals the Mobius Chair told him that there were three Jokers. Before dying, Myrina Black tells Wonder Woman that she has a secret twin brother named Jason, and Cyborg is freed. Superman learns from doctors that he is dying and has only a few months left.

Owlman transports the Mobius Chair to the moon (with the Grid installed in the Mobius Chair). Metron appears in front of Owlman and wants the chair, but Owlman says with the chair he can gain more power and learn more secrets of the universe. As Owlman is talking, he and Metron are vaporized by a mysterious entity, with only the Mobius Chair left intact.

== Issues involved ==
=== Core issues ===
==== Act One ====
- Justice League (vol. 2) #40 (Prologue)
- Justice League (vol. 2) #41 (Chapter One: "God vs. Man")
- Justice League (vol. 2) #42 (Chapter Two: "The New God")
- Justice League (vol. 2) #43 (Chapter Three: "Taken")
- Justice League (vol. 2) #44 (Chapter Four: "The Death of Darkseid")

==== Act Two: "After Death" ====
- Justice League (vol. 2) #45 (Chapter Five: "After Death Part One")
- Justice League (vol. 2) #46 (Chapter Six: "After Death Part Two")

==== Act Three: "Gods of Justice" ====
- Justice League (vol. 2) #47 (Chapter Seven: "God of Justice")
- Justice League (vol. 2) #48 (Chapter Eight: "Crime Pays")
- Justice League (vol. 2) #49 (Chapter Ten: "Power Mad")
- Justice League (vol. 2) #50 (Finale: "Death and Rebirth")

=== Tie-ins ===
- Justice League: The Darkseid War: Batman #1 ("God Only Knows")
- Justice League: The Darkseid War: Superman #1 ("God of Steel")
- Justice League: The Darkseid War: The Flash #1
- Justice League: The Darkseid War: Green Lantern #1 ("Will You Be My God?")
- Justice League: The Darkseid War: Shazam! #1 ("Mightiest")
- Justice League: The Darkseid War: Lex Luthor #1 ("The Omega Judgment")
- Justice League: The Darkseid War Special #1 (Chapter Nine: "The Darkness Within")

== Collected editions ==
Title	Material collected	Published date	ISBN
Justice League Vol. 7 Darkseid War Part 1	Justice League (vol. 2) #40-44, DC Sneak Peek: Justice League	March 2016	978-1401264529
Justice League Vol. 8 Darkseid War Part 2	Justice League (vol. 2) #46-50, Justice League: The Darkseid War Special	October 2016	978-1401265397
Justice League: The Darkseid War	Justice League (vol. 2) #40-50, Justice League: The Darkseid War Special, DC Sneak Peek: Justice League	October 2018	978-1401284558
Justice League: Darkseid War: Power of the Gods	Justice League: The Darkseid War: Superman #1, Justice League: The Darkseid War: Batman #1, Justice League: The Darkseid War: The Flash #1, Justice League: The Darkseid War: Green Lantern #1, Justice League: The Darkseid War: Shazam! #1, Justice League: The Darkseid War: Lex Luthor #1	May 2016	978-1401261498
Justice League: The Darkseid War Saga Omnibus	Justice League (vol. 2) #40-50, Justice League: The Darkseid War Special, DC Sneak Peek: Justice League, Justice League: The Darkseid War: Superman #1, Justice League: The Darkseid War: Batman #1, Justice League: The Darkseid War: The Flash #1, Justice League: The Darkseid War: Green Lantern #1, Justice League: The Darkseid War: Shazam! #1, Justice League: The Darkseid War: Lex Luthor #1	October 2017	978-1401274023
Justice League: The New 52 Omnibus Vol. 2	Justice League (vol. 2) #24-52, DC Sneak Peek: Justice League #1, Justice League: Darkseid War Special #1, Justice League: Darkseid War: Batman #1, Justice League: Darkseid War: The Flash #1, Justice League: Darkseid War: Green Lantern #1, Justice League: Darkseid War: Lex Luthor #1, Justice League: Darkseid War: Shazam! #1, Justice League: Darkseid War: Superman #1 and Forever Evil #1-7, DC Universe: Rebirth #1, Justice League feat. Secret Society #234, Justice League of America feat. Black Adam #74,	August 2022	978-1779515582

== Reception ==
The story received critical acclaim for the art, plot, and action.

According to review aggregator Comic Book Roundup, Justice League #40 received an average score of 8.4 out of 10 based on 19 reviews. Erik Gonzalez from All-Comic wrote: "DC has some heavy-hitting issues this week, but Justice League may well be the top pick (yes, even with the conclusion to "Endgame" in Batman). It is rare for this reviewer to be so blown away and immersed in a comic such as he was with this book, even rarer is to re-read it three times in two days. Please, do yourself a favor and pick up Justice League #40 and prepare for the Darkseid War!"

According to Comic Book Roundup, Justice League #41 received an average score of 9 out of 10 based on 37 reviews. Tony G-Man Guerro from Comicvine wrote: "Often when we read the first part of a big story, there's a lot of set up and the action is often light. That isn't the case here. Geoff Johns has been moving this series towards Darkseid War since the first issue. While we are introduced to some new players, there is plenty of story, character building, and action to keep us glued. Jason Fabok and Brad Anderson's art and colors are phenomenal. There's some big developments and huge twists even though the story is just beginning. Who knows how intense things will get after this? This is like a summer blockbuster movie. Where's my popcorn at? I'll be counting down the days until issue #42".

According to Comic Book Roundup, Justice League #42 received an average score of 8.2 out of 10 based on 28 reviews. Danny Rivera from Comicsverse wrote: "I almost wish I had something actually bad to say about this run. Everything about its execution is top notch, allowing you to sit back, strap in, and let Johns' story take you on a whirlwind of a ride. Especially after that last page (THAT LAST PAGE!), I cannot wait until next month".

According to Comic Book Roundup, Justice League #43 received an average score of 8.6 out of 10 based on 31 reviews. Matt Santori from Comicosity wrote: "Another awesome chapter in the evolving event, Justice League #43 feels very much like the end of Act 1, which means things are about to get DARK. And I am so ready for the ride. Johns and Fabok are giving us a ton of excitement and a world of mythology and legend to piece together. Characterization, action, gorgeous art. Darkseid. This one has it all".

According to Comic Book Roundup, Justice League #44 received an average score of 9 out of 10 based on 30 reviews. Timdogg from The Kliq Nation wrote: "Darkseid War has not disappointed. Each issue adds an additional layer to the complex story. Geoff Johns and Jason Fabok are flexing their collaborative muscles and bringing the absolute best out of each other. Can the Justice League (Gods on Earth) hope to contend with actual Gods from the cosmos? We have to keep reading to find out".

According to Comic Book Roundup, Justice League #45 received an average score of 7.8 out of 10 based on 27 reviews. Terry Miles Jr from Batman News wrote: "I was on the edge of my seat while reading this issue. Mainly because I don't sit properly in my chair, but I was also highly entertained but what unfolded. Essentially the conclusion to something big, and the start of something bigger Justice League #45 is terrific, start to finish. Although the main fight is done Justice League have their hands full with the multiple changes within the team".

According to Comic Book Roundup, Justice League #46 received an average score of 7.1 out of 10 based on 24 reviews. Bill Heuer from The Batman Universe wrote: "Overall, another good issue but not quite the big return I was expecting. Still, with the relationship and character development, this issue will hopefully be seen in hindsight as a good point in the arc to slow down a little and expand on those story points. I am excited for the return of the members of the Crime Syndicate. Forever Evil was a fun arc and getting some of those characters back will be a welcomed addition to this story".

According to Comic Book Roundup, Justice League #47 received an average score of 8.2 out of 10 based on 29 reviews. Alec Ward from Dark Knight News wrote: "This issue has been one of my favorites of the series so far, and the return of Jason Fabok only made it that much better. I love Francis Manapul, truly I do. I don't have kids, but if I did, I would gladly allow him to take my kids from me. That being said, it is so fantastic to see the return of Fabok in this issue. His art is like a grilled cheese sandwich for me, and I could eat this comfort food until the cows come home. The same could be said about this series as a whole. It's warm blanket-like goodness is something I only wish to wrap myself in every month".

According to Comic Book Roundup, Justice League #48 received an average score of 9.1 out of 10 based on 20 reviews. David Repose from Newsarama wrote: "The Darkseid War, and Justice League #48 in particular, is the best-case scenario for all things DC, and hopefully a great sign of things to come under Johns' stewardship of the "Rebirth" era. This issue has high stakes, awesome action, a great balance of characters, spectacular art and all-round perfect execution - this is the kind of comic that excites people, the kind of comic you hope to find when you go to your comic shop every Wednesday. This is Johns and Fabok and ultimately DC at some of its best. They say war is hell, but whoever said that has never read Justice League".

According to Comic Book Roundup, Justice League #49 received an average score of 8.7 out of 10 based on 18 reviews. Mat 'Inferiorego' Elfring from Comic Vine wrote: "JUSTICE LEAGUE #49 does a stellar job at building on this epic story while getting readers ready for the finale. It's exciting, without being a whole issue of people punching each other. Dialogue is the driving force of the book and Johns keeps everything moving through that while developing some newer characters in some key moments. This is one of the best comics this week, and I highly recommend you check this issue out".

According to Comic Book Roundup, Justice League #50 received an average score of 8.8 out of 10 based on 23 reviews. Casey Walsh from GWW wrote: "Justice League #50 is the perfect end to what in my opinion was the best comic book series of the New 52. Johns simply understands the comic book medium and what makes it special and every ounce of his knowledge and fandom spews from the pages of Darkseid War Part 10. It's a must read issue that will only further your excitement for the future of DC comics and its universe".

== In other media ==
The storyline was loosely adapted into the DC Universe Animated Original Movies film Justice League Dark: Apokolips War, the final installment of the DC Animated Movie Universe.
