= DC Multiverse (toy line) =

Action figure toyline

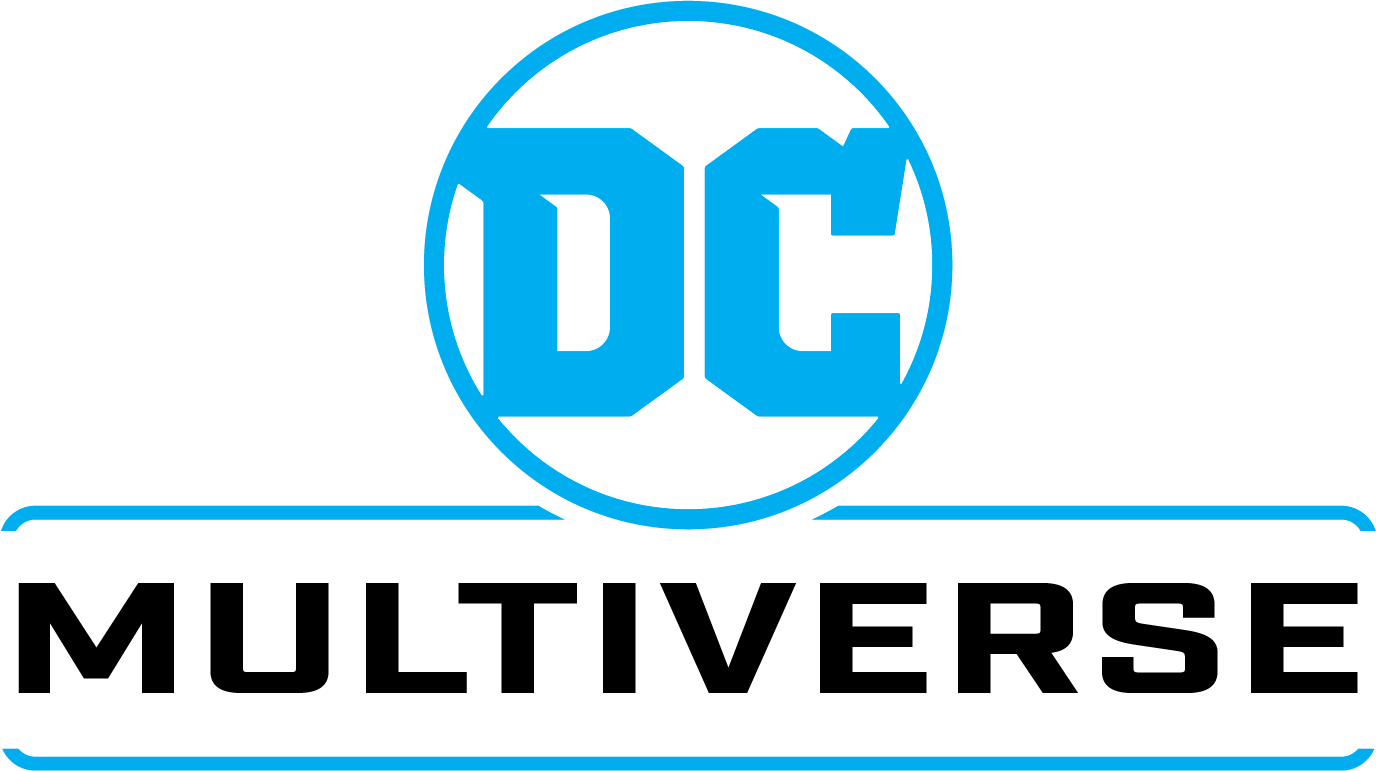
- Type: Action figures
- Invented by: DC Comics
- Company: Mattel (2016–19); McFarlane (2020–present)
- Country: United States
- Availability: 2015–present
- Materials: Plastic
- Features: DC Multiverse

DC Multiverse is an American action figure toyline from Mattel, later by McFarlane Toys. Primarily consisting of 6-inch figures during Mattel's run and 7-inch figures during McFarlane Toys production, the line is based on properties owned by DC Comics. The line was launched as a continuation of Mattel's DC Universe Classics line and utilizes the same scale, sculpt and articulation style. Under McFarlane Toys, the scale was upped to 7-inches with 22 points of articulation.

== History ==
After DC Universe Classics ceased production in 2014, Mattel unveiled figures from the successor line, DC Multiverse, at San-Diego Comic-Con 2015. Unlike the previous line, which primarily focused on comic iterations of the character, it was announced that Multiverse would mix classic comic designs with other media based on DC's characters, such as their films, TV shows and video games. Like DC Universe Classics, DC Multiverse also uses the Collect and Connect concept, where each figure in a wave comes packaged with a piece needed to complete an extra bonus figure or role play item.

In 2019, it was announced that Mattel had lost the DC license, and that the DC Multiverse brand would be taken over by McFarlane Toys beginning in 2020.

== Mattel figures (2016–2019) ==
Mattel action figures
| Collect and Connect Figure | Release | Figure | Accessories | Description | Collect and Connect Piece |
|---|---|---|---|---|---|
| Justice Buster | 2016 | Batman | Grappling pistol | Batman: Zero Year version | Right leg |
| Justice Buster | 2016 | Flash (Barry Allen) | | The Flash version | Head and upper torso |
| Justice Buster | 2016 | Reverse-Flash (Eobard Thawne) | | The Flash version | Lower torso |
| Justice Buster | 2016 | Earth-23 Superman | | The Multiversity version | Left leg |
| Justice Buster | 2016 | Joker | Shredded face | Batman: Endgame version | Left arm |
| Justice Buster | 2016 | Arrow | Bow and arrow | Arrow version | Right arm |
| New 52 Doomsday | 2016 | Supergirl | | Supergirl version | Left leg |
| New 52 Doomsday | 2016 | Armored Batman | Sonic gun | The Dark Knight Returns version | Head and lower torso |
| New 52 Doomsday | 2016 | Robin (Carrie Kelley) | Slingshot | The Dark Knight Returns version | Right leg |
| New 52 Doomsday | 2016 | Mutant Leader | Torch and crowbar | The Dark Knight Returns version | Left arm |
| New 52 Doomsday | 2016 | Prison Jumpsuit Lex Luthor | Attachable manacles | Batman v Superman: Dawn of Justice version | Upper torso |
| New 52 Doomsday | 2016 | Doomed Superman | | Superman: Doomed version | Right arm |
| Grapnel Blaster | 2016 | Superman | | Batman v Superman: Dawn of Justice version Retool of the Movie Masters Man of Steel Superman figure with new accessories | Grip |
| Grapnel Blaster | 2016 | Superman | Alternate heat vision head | Batman v Superman: Dawn of Justice version Same figure as above with different accessories | Grappling hook and blast effect piece |
| Grapnel Blaster | 2016 | Batman | | Batman v Superman: Dawn of Justice version | Display stand |
| Grapnel Blaster | 2016 | Wonder Woman | Sword and shield | Batman v Superman: Dawn of Justice version | Support stand |
| Grapnel Blaster | 2016 | Aquaman | Trident | Batman v Superman: Dawn of Justice version | Grapple darts |
| Grapnel Blaster | 2016 | Armored Batman | Kryptonite grenade launcher | Batman v Superman: Dawn of Justice version | Dart holder |
| Grapnel Blaster | 2016 | Lex Luthor | | Batman v Superman: Dawn of Justice version | Hammer |
| Grapnel Blaster | 2016 | Bat Creature | | Batman v Superman: Dawn of Justice version | Barrel |
| Grapnel Blaster | 2016 | Knightmare Batman | Goggles and three batarangs | Batman v Superman: Dawn of Justice version | Chamber |
| Killer Croc (Suicide Squad) | 2016 | Harley Quinn | Baseball bat | Suicide Squad version | Left leg |
| Killer Croc (Suicide Squad) | 2016 | Deadshot | Alternate unmasked head and pistol | Suicide Squad version | Right arm |
| Killer Croc (Suicide Squad) | 2016 | Joker | Walking stick | Suicide Squad version | Right leg |
| Killer Croc (Suicide Squad) | 2016 | Katana | Soultaker sword, wakizashi and two scabbards | Suicide Squad version | Head and lower torso |
| Killer Croc (Suicide Squad) | 2016 | Captain Boomerang | Three boomerangs | Suicide Squad version | Left arm |
| Killer Croc (Suicide Squad) | 2016 | Gas Mask Batman | Grapple gun, grenade, handcuffs and three batarangs | Suicide Squad version Retool of the Grapple Gun wave Batman figure with a new head | Upper torso |
| King Shark | 2017 | Batman (James Gordon) | Alternate unmasked head and stun pistol | | Right leg |
| King Shark | 2017 | Batgirl (Barbara Gordon) | Smartphone and batarang | Batgirl of Burnside version | Right arm |
| King Shark | 2017 | Hawkman | Nth Metal mace | Legends of Tomorrow version | Left leg |
| King Shark | 2017 | Zoom | Three Speed Force effect pieces | The Flash version Retool of the Justice Buster wave Flash figure | Head and lower torso |
| King Shark | 2017 | Earth-2 Flash | Alternate hands, removable helmet and two Speed Force effect pieces | The Flash version | Left arm |
| King Shark | 2017 | Joker | Alternate laughing head, knife and pistol | The Dark Knight Returns version | Upper torso |
| Ares (Wonder Woman) | 2017 | Cloaked Wonder Woman | Sword | Wonder Woman version Retool of the Wonder Woman figure from the Grapple Gun wave with new accessories | Left arm and right leg |
| Ares (Wonder Woman) | 2017 | Steve Trevor | Rifle | Wonder Woman version | Head, upper torso and sword |
| Ares (Wonder Woman) | 2017 | Hippolyta | Sword and spear | Wonder Woman version | Left arm and right leg |
| Ares (Wonder Woman) | 2017 | Diana of Themyscira | Sword | Wonder Woman version | Lower torso |
| Ares (Wonder Woman) | 2017 | Menalippe | Bow, arrow, spear and two flaming swords | Wonder Woman version | |
| Rookie | 2017 | Batman | | DC Rebirth version | Right leg |
| Rookie | 2017 | Duke Thomas | Alternate unmasked head, nunchaku and spray paint can | We Are Robin version | Left leg |
| Rookie | 2017 | Batwing (Luke Fox) | Attachable wings | | Arms |
| Rookie | 2017 | The Atom | Alternate unmasked head and miniature Atom | Legends of Tomorrow version | Head and lower torso |
| Rookie | 2017 | Reaper (Joe Chill Jr.) | Alternate hands | Batman: Full Circle version | Upper torso |
| Steppenwolf (Justice League) | 2017 | Superman | | Justice League version Repaint of the Grapnel Blaster wave Superman figure | Head and lower torso |
| Steppenwolf (Justice League) | 2017 | Wonder Woman | Sword and Lasso of Truth | Justice League version Repaint of the Grapnel Blaster wave Wonder Woman figure | Right arm |
| Steppenwolf (Justice League) | 2017 | Tactical Armor Batman | | Justice League version | |
| Steppenwolf (Justice League) | 2017 | Cyborg | Sonic blaster | Justice League version | Left arm and axe |
| Steppenwolf (Justice League) | 2017 | Flash (Barry Allen) | | Justice League version | Left leg |
| Steppenwolf (Justice League) | 2017 | Aquaman | Trident | Justice League version | Right leg |
| Steppenwolf (Justice League) | 2017 | Mera | Alternate water effect hands | Justice League version | |
| Doctor Psycho | 2017 | Wonder Woman | | The Dark Knight Strikes Again version | Torso and arms |
| Doctor Psycho | 2017 | Wonder Girl (Cassie Sandsmark) | | Teen Titans version | Head and legs |
| Doctor Psycho | 2017 | Superman | Display card | Super Friends version Redeco of the DC Universe Classics Superman figure with a new cape | |
| Doctor Psycho | 2017 | Aquaman | Trident and display card | Super Friends version Retool and redeco of the DC Unlimited New 52 Aquaman figure with a repaint of the DC Universe Classics Aquaman's head | |
| Clayface | 2018 | Green Lantern (Jessica Cruz) | Power Battery and four energy effect pieces | | Legs |
| Clayface | 2018 | Martian Manhunter | Black Mercy | Supergirl version | Left arm |
| Clayface | 2018 | Batwoman | Alternate unmasked head | DC Rebirth version | Head and lower torso |
| Clayface | 2018 | Two-Face | Alternate coin hands and two pistols | DC Rebirth version | Upper torso |
| Clayface | 2018 | Superman | Alternate hands | DC Rebirth version | Right arm |
| Trench (Aquaman) | 2018 | Aquaman | Trident | Aquaman version | Right leg |
| Trench (Aquaman) | 2018 | Mera | Alternate water effect hands and spear | Aquaman version | Arms |
| Trench (Aquaman) | 2018 | Black Manta | Sword | Aquaman version | Head and torso |
| Trench (Aquaman) | 2018 | Ocean Master | Trident | Aquaman version | Left leg |
| Lobo | 2018 | | | | |
| Lobo | 2018 | Batman (Terry McGinnis) | Alternate head, hands and four batarangs | Batman Beyond version | Heads and lower torso |
| Lobo | 2018 | Green Lantern (Kyle Rayner) | Power Battery and energy effect piece | | Legs |
| Lobo | 2018 | Kid Flash (Ace West) | Alternate hands | DC Rebirth version | Arms, hook and chain |
| Lobo | 2018 | Superman | Alternate hands | Kingdom Come version | Upper torso and necklace |
| Lex Luthor (DC Rebirth) | 2018 | Wonder Woman | Sword, Lasso of Truth and alternate hand | DC Rebirth version | Legs |
| Lex Luthor (DC Rebirth) | 2018 | Harley Quinn | Mallet, flag gun and two anklets | DC Rebirth version | Mother Box |
| Lex Luthor (DC Rebirth) | 2018 | Vixen | Bird totem | DC Rebirth version | Torso |
| Lex Luthor (DC Rebirth) | 2018 | Spoiler | Three-section staff | DC Rebirth version | Alternate head |
| Lex Luthor (DC Rebirth) | 2018 | Ray (Ray Terrill) | Alternate head | DC Rebirth version | Arms |
| Lex Luthor (DC Rebirth) | 2018 | Batman | Alternate hands and four knives | Gotham by Gaslight version | Head and cape |
| Batman Ninja | 2019 | Green Lantern (John Stewart) | Alternate ring effect hand and alternate hand | | Torso |
| Batman Ninja | 2019 | Flash (Wally West) | Two Speed Force effect pieces and alternate hands | DC Rebirth version | Right arm and alternate hand |
| Batman Ninja | 2019 | Starfire | Two starbolt effect pieces | DC Rebirth version | Head and cape |
| Batman Ninja | 2019 | Nightwing | Eskrima sticks and alternate hands | DC Rebirth version | Left leg |
| Batman Ninja | 2019 | Beast Boy | | DC Rebirth version | Left arm, alternate hand, katana and scabbard |
| Batman Ninja | 2019 | Black Lightning | Two alternate lightning effect hands and two alternate hands | Black Lightning version | Right leg |
| Killer Croc | 2019 | Batman (Dick Grayson) | Alternate unmasked head and cowl | Batman and Robin version | Left leg |
| Killer Croc | 2019 | Alfred Pennyworth | Alternate Michael Gough (Batman (1989 film)), Alan Napier (Batman (TV series)) and Outsider heads, tray, cup and discarded Batman mask | Classic version | Right arm |
| Killer Croc | 2019 | Red Hood (Jason Todd) | Alternate domino mask head, two guns and four alternate hands | DC Rebirth version | Right leg |
| Killer Croc | 2019 | Red Robin (Tim Drake) | Bo staff and two alternate hands | DC Rebirth version | Left arm |
| Killer Croc | 2019 | Katana | Soultaker sword and alternate hand | DC Rebirth version | Upper torso |
| Killer Croc | 2019 | KGBeast | Missile and three knives | DC Rebirth version | Head and lower torso |

=== Non-C&C Releases ===
Certain figures were also released in smaller waves without a Collect and Connect component.

Non-C&C action figures
| Figure | Release | Accessories | Description |
|---|---|---|---|
| Shazam | 2019 | Four alternate hands | Shazam! version |
| Doctor Sivana | 2019 | Alternate head, hands and magic eight ball | Shazam! version |

=== Signature Collection ===
| Figure | Release | Accessories | Description |
|---|---|---|---|
| Batman | 2018 | Grappling hook gun, alternate hands, display base, flight stand and Val Kilmer photo card | Batman Forever version |
| The Flash (Barry Allen) | 2018 | 4 alternate hands, display base, flight stand and John Wesley Shipp photo card | The Flash version |
| Wonder Woman | 2018 | Bundled lasso, cape, display base, flight stand and Lynda Carter photo card | Wonder Woman version |
| The Joker | 2019 | Machine gun, pistol, knife, playing card, display base and Heath Ledger photo card | The Dark Knight version |
| The Penguin | 2019 | Top hat, overcoat, umbrella, gas plume effect piece, display base and Danny DeVito photo card | Batman Returns version |

=== Exclusives ===
Amazon-exclusive figures
| Figure | Release | Accessories | Description |
|---|---|---|---|
| Club Dress Harley Quinn | 2016 | Alternate hands | Suicide Squad version |
| Nuidis Vulko | 2018 | Sword and Atlantean scroll | Aquaman version |

Toys R Us-exclusive figures
| Figure | Release | Accessories | Description |
|---|---|---|---|
| Harley Quinn | 2016 | Mallet and alternate jacket for the Killer Croc Collect and Connect figure | Suicide Squad version |
| Joker | 2016 | Pistol, switchblade and alternate jacket arms for the Killer Croc Collect and Connect figure | Suicide Squad version |
| El Diablo | 2016 | Alternate fire effect hands | Suicide Squad version |
| Green Lantern (Hal Jordan) | 2017 | Display card | Super Friends version Redeco of the DC Universe Classics Hal Jordan figure |
| Batman | 2017 | Grappling gun, batarang and display card | Super Friends version Redeco of the DC Universe Classics Batman figure |
| Robin (Damian Wayne) | 2017 | Sword, Court of Owls mask and alternate head for the King Shark Collect and Connect figure | |
| Shirtless Aquaman | 2017 | Alternate head for the Steppenwolf Collect and Connect figure | Justice League version Retool of the Grapnel Blaster wave Aquaman figure |
| Parademon | 2017 | Blaster | Justice League version |

Walgreens-exclusive figures
| Figure | Release | Accessories | Description |
|---|---|---|---|
| The Flash (Barry Allen) | 2017 | Miniature Atom | The Dark Knight Strikes Again version |
| Bizarro | 2019 | Sleeveless jacket, tie, glasses, Bizarro #1 necklace and alternate hands | |

Walmart-exclusive figures
| Figure | Release | Accessories | Description |
|---|---|---|---|
| Rick Flag Jr. | 2016 | Machine gun, pistol, grenade launcher and knife | Suicide Squad version |
| Batman | 2017 | Three Mother Box halves for the Steppenwolf Collect and Connect figure | Justice League version Retool and repaint of the Grapnel Blaster wave Batman |
| Armored Cyborg | 2017 | Three Mother Box halves for the Steppenwolf Collect and Connect figure | Justice League version Retool of the Steppenwolf wave Cyborg with a new head |

=== Vehicles ===
| Vehicle | Year | Accessories | Description |
|---|---|---|---|
| Batmobile | 2017 | | Justice League version |

== McFarlane figures (2020–present) ==
=== Standard figures ===
| Release | Figure | Accessories | Description |
|---|---|---|---|
| Q1 2020 | Batman | Batarang, grappling pistol, display stand and Jim Lee art card | Detective Comics #1000 version |
| Q1 2020 | Superman | Alternate hands, flight stand and Jim Lee, Scott Williams, and Alex Sinclair art card | Action Comics #1000 version |
| Q1 2020 | Batman | Grappling pistol, batarang alternate hands, display stand and Bruce Timm art card | Batman: The Animated Series version |
| Q1 2020 | Superman | Crushed steel beam, alternate hands, display stand and Bruce Timm art card | Superman: The Animated Series version |
| Q1 2020 | Green Lantern (John Stewart) | Energy construct gun, headset, display stand and Bruce Timm art card | Justice League Unlimited version |
| Q1 2020 | Harley Quinn | Mallet, flag pistol, display stand and Terry Dodson art card | DC Classic version |
| Q1 2020 | Green Arrow | Bow, arrows, quiver, display stand and Stephen Amell photo card | Arrow version |
| Q1 2020 | Batman | Display stand and Patrick Gleason art card | Hellbat armor version |
| Q1 2020 | Superman | Display stand and Jim Lee, Scott Williams, and Alex Sinclair art card | Superman Unchained armor version |
| Q2 2020 | Wonder Woman | Lasso of Truth, wound up lasso, display stand and Gal Gadot photo card | Wonder Woman 1984 version |
| Q2 2020 | Wonder Woman | Flight stand and Gal Gadot photo card | Wonder Woman 1984 armored version |
| Q2 2020 | The Joker | Pistol, alternate head, display stand and Sean Gordon Murphy art card | Batman: White Knight version |
| Q2 2020 | Batman | Grappling pistol, rope line, alternate hand, wound up cable, display stand and Sean Gordon Murphy art card | Batman: White Knight version |
| Q2 2020 | Azrael | Flame effect, sword, display stand and Sean Gordon Murphy art card | Batman: Curse of the White Knight version |
| Q2 2020 | The Joker | Pistol, 2 wind-up chattering teeth, display stand and CGI art card | Batman: Arkham Asylum version |
| Q2 2020 | The Joker | Pistol, 2 wind-up chattering teeth, display stand and foil CGI art card | Bronze variant (Chase - Platinum Edition) |
| Q2 2020 | Batman | Grappling gun, batarang, folded batarang, grenade, display stand and CGI art card | Batman: Arkham Asylum version |
| Q2 2020 | Batman | Grappling gun, batarang, folded batarang, grenade, display stand and foil CGI art card | Bronze variant (Chase - Platinum Edition) |
| Fall 2020 | The Flash (Barry Allen) | 6 lightning effect pieces, display stand and Karl Kerschl art card | DC Rebirth version |
| Fall 2020 | Cyborg | Alternate sonic cannon arm, display stand and Glen Murakami art card | Teen Titans version |
| Fall 2020 | Azrael Batman Armor | Sword, display stand and Sean Gordon Murphy art card | Batman: Curse of the White Knight version |
| Fall 2020 | The Joker | Pistol, crowbar, display stand and Jim Lee art card | DC Rebirth version |
| Fall 2020 | Batman | Batarang, grappling gun, explosive gel gun, display stand and CGI art card | Batman: Arkham Knight version |
| Fall 2020 | Batman | Batarang, grappling gun, explosive gel gun, display stand and foil CGI art card | Gold variant (Chase - Platinum Edition) |
| Fall 2020 | Deathstroke | Katana, display stand and CGI art card | Batman: Arkham Origins version |
| Fall 2020 | Deathstroke | Katana, display stand and foil CGI art card | Gold variant (Chase - Platinum Edition) |
| Fall 2020 | The Dawnbreaker (Earth -32 Batman) | Bat energy construct, flight stand and Jason Fabok art card | Dark Nights: Metal version |
| Fall 2020 | The Devastator (Earth -1 Batman) | Display stand and Jason Fabok art card | Dark Nights: Metal version |
| Fall 2020 | The Murder Machine (Earth -44 Batman) | Tentacles, display stand and Riccardo Federici art card | Dark Nights: Metal version |
| Q1 2021 | Robin (Damian Wayne) | Sword, 2 throwing glaives, display stand and Jonboy Meyers art card | DC Rebirth version |
| Q1 2021 | Robin (Damian Wayne) | Sword, 2 throwing glaives, display stand and Jonboy Meyers art card | DC Rebirth version Black Suit variant |
| Q1 2021 | Superman | Alternate hands, flight stand and Dave Johnson art card | Superman: Red Son version Redeco of the Jim Lee Superman with alternate head |
| Q1 2021 | The Drowned (Earth -11 Batwoman) | Trident, display stand and Jason Fabok art card | Dark Nights: Metal version |
| Q1 2021 | Batman | Scythe, display stand and David Finch art card | Dark Nights: Death Metal version |
| Q1 2021 | Gorilla Grodd | Photo card and display stand | Injustice 2 version |
| Q1 2021 | Gorilla Grodd | Photo card and display stand | Injustice 2 Platinum variant (Chase - Platinum Edition) |
| Q1 2021 | The Flash (Barry Allen) | 3 Speed Force effect pieces, photo card and display stand | Injustice 2 version |
| Q1 2021 | The Flash (Barry Allen) | 3 Speed Force effect pieces, photo card and display stand | Injustice 2 Hot Pursuit variant |
| Q1 2021 | Batman (Thomas Wayne) | Sword and two pistols. | Flashpoint unmasked version Retool of the Target exclusive Thomas Wayne figure with a new head |
| Q1 2021 | Green Lantern (John Stewart) | Energy construct minigun, chest armor and backpack, display stand and Jim Lee art card | DC Rebirth version |
| Q1 2021 | Bizarro | Alternate hands, display stand and Patrick Gleason art card | DC Rebirth version |
| Q1 2021 | Nightwing | Eskrima sticks, display stand and Eddy Barrows art card | Death of the Family Jokerized version Retool of the DC Rebirth Nightwing figure with a new head |
| Q1 2021 | Batman | Batarang, 2 swords, display stand and Todd McFarlane art card | Original design by Todd McFarlane; Blue and gray variant |
| Q3 2021 | Superman | Flight stand and Henry Cavill photo card | Zack Snyder's Justice League black suit version |
| Q3 2021 | Batman | Batarang, display stand and Ben Affleck photo card | Zack Snyder's Justice League tactical suit version |
| Q3 2021 | Batman | Batarang, display stand and Ben Affleck photo card | Zack Snyder's Justice League tactical suit version Goggles up variant (Chase - Platinum Edition) |
| Q3 2021 | Aquaman | Trident, display stand and Jason Momoa photo card | Zack Snyder's Justice League version |
| Q3 2021 | Flash (Barry Allen) | 4 electricity effect pieces, display stand and Ezra Miller photo card | Zack Snyder's Justice League version |
| Q3 2021 | Cyborg | Alternate sonic cannon arm, display stand and Ray Fisher photo card | Zack Snyder's Justice League version |
| Q3 2021 | Batman (Terry McGinnis) | Batarang, alternate hands, 2 jet exhaust pieces, flight stand and toy photo card | Mouth version |
| Q3 2021 | Batman (Terry McGinnis) | Batarang, alternate hands, 2 jet exhaust pieces, flight stand and toy photo card | Digitized Damage variant (Chase - Platinum Edition) |
| Q3 2021 | King Shazam | Photo card | Year of the Villain: The Infected version |
| Q3 2021 | Wonder Woman | Sword, shield, display stand and toy photo card | Original design by Todd McFarlane |
| Q3 2021 | The Demon | Photo card | Demon Knights version |
| Q3 2021 | Armored Batman | 2 extra hands, display stand, and toy photo card | The Dark Knight Returns version |
| Q3 2021 | Armored Batman | 2 extra hands, display stand, and toy photo card | The Dark Knight Returns version Blue Edition, variant with blue armor and yellow belt Physical store only release |
| Q3 2021 | Doctor Fate | Flight stand and toy photo card | Injustice 2 version |
| Q3 2021 | Doctor Fate | Flight stand and toy photo card | Injustice 2 blue version (Chase - Platinum Edition) |
| Q4 2021 | Reverse-Flash | Display stand, and toy photo card | DC Rebirth version Redeco of The Flash with a new head |
| Q4 2021 | Lobo | Chained hook, display stand, and toy photo card | DC Rebirth version |
| Q4 2021 | Lobo | Chained hook, display stand, and artist proof toy photo card | DC Rebirth version Artists Proof (Chase - Platinum Edition) |
| Q4 2021 | Superboy-Prime | Flight stand, and toy photo card | Dark Nights: Death Metal version |
| Q4 2021 | Batman (Hazmat Suit) | Display stand and toy photo card | Justice League Rebirth |
| Q4 2021 | Red Hood (Jason Todd) | Alternate 'finger guns' hands, display stand, and toy photo card | Gotham Knights version |
| Q4 2021 | Red Hood (Jason Todd) | Alternate 'finger guns' hands, display stand, and artist proof toy photo card | Gotham Knights version Artists Proof (Chase - Platinum Edition) |
| Q4 2021 | Batgirl (Barbara Gordon) | Night stick, display stand and toy photo card | Gotham Knights version |
| Q4 2021 | Batgirl (Barbara Gordon) | Night stick, display stand and artist proof toy photo card | Gotham Knights version Artists Proof (Chase - Platinum Edition) |
| Q4 2021 | Robin (Tim Drake) | Staff, display stand and toy photo card | Gotham Knights version |
| Q4 2021 | Nightwing | 2 Escrima sticks, display stand, and toy photo card | Gotham Knights version |
| Q4 2021 | Superman | Display stand and toy photo card | DC Rebirth version Redeco of Bizzaro DC Rebirth with alternate head and chest plate |
| Q4 2021 | Superman | Display stand and artist proof toy photo card | DC Rebirth version Artist Proof (Chase - Platinum Edition) |
| Q4 2021 | Harley Quinn | Hammer, egg sandwich, display stand and toy photo card | Birds of Prey version |
| Q4 2021 | The Flash (Wally West) | Alternate hands, electricity effect piece, display stand and toy photo card | Superman: The Animated Series version |
| Q4 2021 | Superman (Black Suit) | Crushed steel beam, alternate hands, display stand and toy photo card | Superman: The Animated Series version Redeco of original Superman: The Animated Series version |
| Q4 2021 | Lex Luthor (Power Suit) | Alternate hands, display stand and toy photo card | New 52 Green Version |
| Q4 2021 | Lex Luthor (Power Suit) | Throne, display stand, and toy photo card | Justice League: The Darkseid War Blue version |
| Q4 2021 | Batgirl | Batarang, grappling gun, display stand and toy photo card | Three Jokers version |
| Q4 2021 | Red Hood | Crowbar, display stand and toy photo card | Three Jokers version |
| Q4 2021 | Batman | Grappling gun, display stand and toy photo card | Three Jokers version |
| Q4 2021 | The Joker (The Clown) | Crowbar, fish, display stand and toy photo card | Three Jokers version |
| Q4 2021 | The Joker (The Criminal) | Cane, display stand and toy photo card | Three Jokers version |
| Q4 2021 | Batwoman (Elainna Grayson) | Batarang, 2 jet exhaust pieces, alternate hands, display stand and toy photo card | Batman Beyond version Unmasked version |
| Q4 2021 | Shriek | 2 sonic blast effect pieces, display stand and toy photo card | Batman Beyond version Unmasked version |
| Q4 2021 | Inque as Batman Beyond | Batarang, 2 alternate hands, flight stand and toy photo card | Batman Beyond version Blue Redeco of Batman Beyond mouth version |
| Q4 2021 | Blight | 2 effects, display stand and toy photo card | Batman Beyond version Unmasked "Meltdown" version |
| Q1 2022 | Batman | Grapple gun, display stand, and toy photo card | The Batman version |
| Q1 2022 | Batman | Grapple gun, display stand, and toy photo card | The Batman version Unmasked version |
| Q1 2022 | Riddler | Ice picker, display stand, and toy photo card | The Batman version |
| Q1 2022 | Catwoman | Whip, display stand, and toy photo card | The Batman version |
| Q1 2022 | Catwoman | Whip, display stand, and toy photo card | The Batman version Unmasked version |
| Q1 2022 | Bruce Wayne (Drifter) | Backpack, display stand, and toy photo card | The Batman version |
| Q1 2022 | Bruce Wayne (Drifter) | Backpack, display stand, and toy photo card | The Batman version Unmasked version (Target Exclusive) |
| Q1 2022 | Penguin | Display stand, and toy photo card | The Batman version |
| Q1 2022 | Batman (Jace Fox) | Batarang, 2 alternate hands, display stand, and toy photo card | Future State version |
| Q1 2022 | Aquaman | Trident, display stand, and toy photo card | Endless Winter version |
| Q1 2022 | Martian Manhunter | Display stand, and toy photo card | DC Rebirth version |
| Q1 2022 | General Zod | 4 Alternate hands, display stand, and toy photo card | DC Rebirth version |
| Q1 2022 | General Zod | 4 Alternate hands, display stand, and artist proof toy photo card | DC Rebirth version Artist Proof (Chase - Platinum Edition) |
| Q1 2022 | Batman Dark Detective | Grapple hook, display stand, and toy photo card | Future State version |
| Q1 2022 | Superman (Solar Suit) | Alternate hands, display stand, and toy photo card | Superman: Lois and Clark version Redeco of Superman DC Rebirth with alternate head and chest plate |
| Q1 2022 | Ghost-Maker | Two swords, display stand, and toy photo card | Future State version |
| Q1 2022 | Ghost-Maker | Two swords, display stand, and artist proof toy photo card | Future State version Artist Proof (Chase - Platinum Edition) |
| Q1 2022 | Godspeed | 2 lightning effects, display stand, and toy photo card | DC Rebirth |
| Q1 2022 | Green Arrow | Bow, arrow bundle, quiver, display stand, and toy photo card | Injustice 2 version |
| Q1 2022 | Green Arrow | Bow, arrows, quiver, display stand, and artist proof toy photo card | Injustice 2 version Artist Proof (Chase - Platinum Edition) |
| Q1 2022 | The Arkham Knight | Grapple gun, 2 smoke grenades, display stand, and toy photo card | Batman: Arkham Knight version |
| Q2 2022 | Black Adam | 2 Lightning effects, display stand, and Dwayne Johnson photo card | Black Adam version |
| Q2 2022 | Black Adam | Cloak, display stand, and Kaare Andrews art card | Black Adam version |
| Q2 2022 | Dr. Fate | Flight stand, display stand, and Kaare Andrews art card | Black Adam version |
| Q2 2022 | Cyclone | Cyclone effect, display stand, and Kaare Andrews art card | Black Adam version |
| Q2 2022 | Atom Smasher | 2 alternate hands, display stand, and Kaare Andrews art card | Black Adam version |
| Q2 2022 | Hawkman | Mace, Wings, display stand, and Kaare Andrews art card | Black Adam version |
| Q2 2022 | Robin (Damian Wayne) | Sword, display stand, and toy photo card | Infinite Frontier version |
| Q2 2022 | Batman | Batarang, grapple gun, display stand, and toy photo card | DC Rebirth version |
| Q2 2022 | Nega Cyborg | Alternate sonic cannon arm, display stand and toy photo card | Teen Titans version |
| Q2 2022 | Grifter | Sword, knife, display stand, and toy photo card | Infinite Frontier version |
| Q2 2022 | The Flash (Barry Allen) | 3 lightning effects, display stand, and toy photo card | The Flash version |
| Q2 2022 | The Flash (Barry Allen) | 3 lightning effects, display stand, and artist proof toy photo card | The Flash version Artist Proof (Chase - Platinum Edition) |
| Q2 2022 | Superman (Jonathan Kent) | 2 alternate hands, flight stand, and toy photo card | Future State version |
| Q2 2022 | Hush | Two knives, display stand, and toy photo card | Batman: Hush version |
| Q2 2022 | Hush | Two knives, display stand, and artist proof toy photo card | Batman: Hush version Artist Proof (Chase - Platinum Edition) |
| Q2 2022 | Red Robin (Tim Drake) | Staff, display stand and toy photo card | The New 52 version |
| Q2 2022 | Batman (Duke Thomas) | Axe, display stand, and toy photo card | Tales from the Dark Multiverse version |
| Q2 2022 | The Batman Who Laughs as Batman | Batarang, display stand, and toy photo card | Dark Nights: Metal version |
| Q2 2022 | Reverse-Flash | 3 Speed Force effect pieces, photo card and display stand | Injustice 2 version |
Q3 2022
| Q3 2022 | Static | 2 electricity effect pieces, effect stand, display stand, and Joe Bennett and Jack Jadson art card | The New 52 version |
| Q3 2022 | Scarecrow | Display stand and art card | Infinite Frontier version |
| Q3 2022 | Scarecrow | Display stand and CGI art card | Batman: Arkham Knight version |
| Q3 2022 | Red Hood | 2 alternate hands, 2 effects, display stand, and CGI art card | Batman: Arkham Knight version |
| Q3 2022 | The Joker | Knife, sword, display stand, and CGI art card | Batman: Arkham City version |
| Q3 2022 | Superman | Axe, shield, photo card, and display stand | Future State version |
| Q3 2022 | Talon | Two swords, 2 knives, sheath, art card, and display stand | Court of Owls version |
| Q3 2022 | Deathstroke | Knife, sword, display stand, and Tony S. Daniel, Sandu Florea, and Tomeu Morey art card | DC Rebirth version |
| Q3 2022 | Batman (Superman) | 2 alternate hands, flight stand, and toy photo card | Superman: Speeding Bullets version |
| Q3 2022 | Batrocitus | 2 alternate hands, lantern, display stand, and toy photo card | Dark Nights: Metal version |
| Q3 2022 | Black Adam | Throne, display stand, and Kaare Andrews art card | Same as Black Adam version |
| Q1 2023 | Batman | 2 Batarangs, 2 alternate hands, display stand, and Jim Lee art card | Batman: Hush version Blue Redeco of the Three Jokers Batman with a new head sculpt and emblem |
| Q1 2023 | The Signal | Eskrima sticks, display stand, and art card | DC Rebirth version |
| Q1 2023 | The Joker | Knife, display stand, and Jorge Jimenez art card | Infinite Frontier version |
| Q1 2023 | Mr. Freeze | Freeze ray, display stand, and Jason Fabok art card | |
| Q1 2023 | Superboy | Display stand and Dan Jurgens art card | Young Justice version Retool of Superman (Jonathan Kent) Future State version |
| Q1 2023 | Catwoman | 2 alternate hands, Whip, display stand, and Jim Balent art card | Batman: Knightfall version |
| Q1 2023 | Shazam | 2 alternate hands, 2 lightning effects, display stand, and art card | Shazam! Fury of the Gods version |
| Q1 2023 | Earth-2 Batman (Thomas Wayne) | Batarang, display stand, and Barry Kitson art card | Batman: Arkham Knight version |
| Q1 2023 | Gladiator Batman | Axe, display stand, and Greg Capullo and Jonathan Glapion art card | Dark Nights: Metal version |
| Q1 2023 | Batman | Wings, display stand, and Alex Ross art card | Kingdom Come version |
| Q1 2023 | Flash (Jay Garrick) | 2 alternate hands, 4 speed force effects, display stand, and Alex Ross art card | DC Classic version |
| Q1 2023 | The Riddler | Staff, display stand, and CGI card | Batman: Arkham City version |
| Q2 2023 | Wonder Woman | Lasso of Truth, bundled lasso, removable tiara, display stand, and art card | Shazam!: Fury of the Gods version Retool and redeco of the 1984 Wonder Woman figure with a new head |
| Q2 2023 | The Flash | 4 lightning effect pieces, display stand, and art card | The Flash version |
| Q2 2023 | Batman (1989) | Batarang, alternate hands, grappling hook gun, display stand, and art card | The Flash version |
| Q2 2023 | Supergirl | Alternate hands, flight stand, and art card | The Flash version |
| Q2 2023 | The Flash (Batman Suit) | 4 lightning effect pieces, display stand, and art card | The Flash version |
| Q2 2023 | Dark Flash | Display stand and art card | The Flash version |
| Q2 2023 | Batman (DCEU) | Alternate hands, display stand, and art card | The Flash version |
| Q2 2023 | Batman | Batarang, 2 alternate hands, display stand and art card | Batman: Knightfall version |
| Q2 2023 | Batwing | 3 jet exhaust effect pieces, display stand, and art card | The New 52 version |
| Q2 2023 | Batman (Two-Face) | 4 alternate hands, display stand, and Tony Daniel art card | Batman: Battle for the Cowl version |
| Q3 2023 | Blue Beetle (Jaime Reyes) | Sword, attachable backpack, 2 ring blades, display stand and art card | Blue Beetle version |
| Q3 2023 | Battle Mode Blue Beetle | Attachable wings, 4 alternate hands, display stand and art card | Blue Beetle version Retool of the standard Blue Beetle figure with alternate accessories |
| Q3 2023 | Superman | Display stand and Jim Lee art card | Batman: Hush version |
| Q3 2023 | Robin (Tim Drake) | Bo staff, batarang, display stand, and Brian Bolland art card | DC Classic version Retool and Redeco of the One Year Later Robin with a new head, belt and cape |
| Q3 2023 | Riddler | Staff, 6 alternate hands, display stand, and Gil Kane and Murphy Anderson art card | DC Classic version |
| Q3 2023 | Batman | Display stand and Jim Lee art card | Batman: Hush version Black and gray Redeco of the previous Hush Batman |
| Q4 2023 | Batman (James Gordon) | Alternate unmasked head, 6 alternate hands, grapple gun, display stand and Greg Capullo and Danny Miki art card | Batman: Endgame version |
| Q4 2023 | Batman | Sword, display stand and Kael Ngu art card | Dark Knights of Steel version |
| Q4 2023 | Brainiac | 4 tendrils, display stand and CGI art card | Injustice 2 version |
| Q4 2023 | Superman | Alternate hands, display stand and Jheremy Raapack art card | Injustice 2 version |
| Q4 2023 | Aquaman | 2 alternate hands, trident, display stand and art card | Aquaman and the Lost Kingdom version |
| Q4 2023 | Aquaman (Stealth Suit) | Trident, display stand and art card | Aquaman and the Lost Kingdom version |
| Q4 2023 | King Kordax | Trident, display stand and art card | Aquaman and the Lost Kingdom version |
| Q4 2023 | Black Manta | 2 flame effects, flight stand and art card | Aquaman and the Lost Kingdom version |
| Q4 2023 | Steel | Hammer, display stand, and Jon Bogdanove and Josh Myers art card | Reign of the Supermen version |
| Q4 2023 | Superman | 4 alternate hands, flight stand, and Michael Cho art card | DC Classic version |
| Q4 2023 | Nightwing | 4 alternate hands, display stand, and Brian Stelfreeze art card | Batman: Knightfall version |
| Q1 2024 | Batman | 2 alternate hands, 2 batarangs, grapple launcher, display stand and photo card | Batman v Superman: Dawn of Justice version |
| Q1 2024 | Batman (Sky Dive) | Backpack, sticky charge, charge launcher, display stand and art card | Unmasked The Dark Knight version |
| Q2 2024 | Batman (Jean-Paul Valley) | 6 fins, display stand and Dennis O'Neil and Digital Chameleon art card | Knightsend version |
| Q2 2024 | Earth-2 Batman | 4 alternate hands, pipe wrench, display stand and Bob Kane art card | First appearance version |
| Q2 2024 | Batman | 2 alternate hands, batarang, display stand and black & grey Kelley Jones art card | Knightfall version Black Redeco of the previous Knightfall Batman |
| Q3 2024 | Robin (Tim Drake) | 8 alternate hands, display stand and Dan Mora art card | Infinite Frontier version |
| Q3 2024 | Mr. Freeze | Display stand and Sweeney Boo art card | Redeco of the initial Mr. Freeze |
| Q3 2024 | Booster Gold | Flight stand and art card | New 52 version |
| Q3 2024 | Ambush Bug | Cheeks the Toy Wonder, display stand and art card | DC Classic version |
| Q3 2024 | Batman | Batarang, Bat-Radio, 4 alternate hands, display stand and Adam West photo card | Batman version |
| Q3 2024 | Batman (Dick Grayson) | 4 alternate hands, display stand and Frank Quitely and Alex Sinclair art card | Batman and Robin version |
| Q4 2024 | Batman/Superman Fusion | Alternate hand, 3 Kryptonite batarangs, display stand and Dan Mora and Tamra Bonvillain art card | World's Finest version |
| Q4 2024 | Cyborg | Arm cannon, display stand and Will Conrad art card | DC Rebirth version |
| Q4 2024 | Red Hood (Jason Todd) | Crowbar, katana, alternate hands, display stand and Carmine Di Giandomenico art card | Dawn of DC version |
| Q4 2024 | Batman | Ace the Bat-Hound, batarang, 4 alternate hands, display stand and Sheldon Moldoff art card | Silver Age version |
| Q4 2024 | Batman (Terry McGinnis) | Alternate hands, display stand and Max Dunbar art card | Batman Beyond: Neo-Gothic version |
| Q4 2024 | Batman | Batarang, alternate hands, display stand and Lee Bermejo art card | Batman: Noel version |
| Q4 2024 | Armored Batman | 2 alternate hands, display stand and Ben Affleck photo card | Batman v Superman: Dawn of Justice version |
| Q4 2024 | Wonder Woman | Lasso of Truth, sword, shield, display stand and Gal Gadot photo card | Batman v Superman: Dawn of Justice version Redeco and retool of the Shazam: Fury of the Gods Wonder Woman with a new head and accessories |
| Q4 2024 | Knightmare Batman | Goggles, binoculars, display stand and Ben Affleck photo card | Batman v Superman: Dawn of Justice version |
| Q1 2025 | Superman | Alternate hands, display stand stand and Pablo Villalobos art card | Fleischer shorts version Retool and redeco of the Crisis on Infinite Earths Superman with a new head |
| Q1 2025 | Tempest | 2 water effect pieces, display stand and Lucas Meyer art card | DC Rebirth version |
| Q1 2025 | Dark Flash (Walter West) | 2 lightning effect pieces, display stand and Steve Lightle art card | Dark Flash Saga version |
| Q1 2025 | Batman | Batarang, grappling gun, scanner, 2 throwing stars, 4 alternate hands, 2 cape handles, display stand and Michael Keaton photo card | Batman version |
| Q1 2025 | Batman | Batarang, grappling pistol, alternate hands, display stand and Christian Bale photo card | Batman Begins version |
| Q1 2025 | Batman One Million | Batarang, display stand and card | Justice Legion Alpha version |
| Q2 2025 | Western World Batman | Batarang, display stand and Ivan Reis art card | Batman/Superman: The Archive of Worlds version |
| Q2 2025 | Eradicator | 2 alternate hands, display stand and card | Reign of the Supermen version Repaint of the Gold Label Eradicator |
| Q2 2025 | Armored Green Lantern (Hal Jordan) | Hammer, display stand and M.D. Bright and Romeo Tanghal art card | Return of Superman version Retool and redeco of Steel with a new head |
| Q2 2025 | Alfred Pennyworth | Apron, 5 tools, 6 alternate hands, display stand and Jeremy Irons photo card | Batman v Superman: Dawn of Justice version |
| Q2 2025 | Superman | 2 alternate hands, display stand and card | Superman version |
| Q2 2025 | Metamorpho | 2 alternate hands, display stand and card | Superman version |
| Q2 2025 | Cyborg Superman | 2 alternate hands, display stand and Ivan Reis art card | Reign of the Supermen version |
| Q3 2025 | Azrael | Display stand and card | Knightquest version |
| Q3 2025 | Batman | Batarang, display stand and Kelley Jones art card | Batman: Troika version |
| Q3 2025 | Batwing (Luke Fox) | Exhaust flame effect piece, display stand and Ken Lashley art card | Batwing V. 2.0 version |
| Q3 2025 | Batgirl (Barbara Gordon) | Batarang, grappling hook pistol, display stand and art card | DC Classic version |
| Q3 2025 | Batman | Gas canister, grappling hook, display stand and David Finch art card | Batman Inc. version |
| Q3 2025 | Riddler | Cane, display stand and Jim Lee art card | Batman: Hush version |
| Q3 2025 | Scarecrow | Sickle, skull, display stand and art card | DC Classic version |
| Q3 2025 | Batman (Dick Grayson) | 2 alternate hands, display stand and Jorge Jiménez art card | Earth-2: Society version |
| Q3 2025 | Black Mask | Key ring, 3 alternate hands, display stand and Cliff Chiang art card | Beneath the Mask version |
| Q4 2025 | Superman | Display stand and Mikel Janin art card | Superman and the Authority version |
| Q4 2025 | Flash (Wally West) | 4 alternate hands, display stand and Howard Porter art card | JLA version |
| Q4 2025 | Rocket Red Brigade | 2 blast effect pieces, 2 alternate number plates, display stand and art card | Justice League: Generation Lost version |
| Q4 2025 | Ice | 4 ice effece pieces, display stand and David Nakayama art card | Justice League International version |
| Q1 2026 | Batman | 2 hands, 2 batarangs, display stand and Jim Lee art card | Batman: HUSH 2 version |
| Q1 2026 | Batman (Damian Wayne) | Display stand and Andy Kubert art card | Batman #666 version |
| Q1 2026 | Batman | Display stand and art card | Justice League version Repaint of the Justice League Task Force Batman |
| Q2 2026 | Superman | Display stand and Brandon Routh photo card | Superman Returns version |
| Q2 2026 | Heat Vision Superman | Display stand and Henry Cavill photo card | Batman v Superman: Dawn of Justice version |
| Q2 2026 | Supergirl | Alternate faceplate, 2 alternate hands, display stand and Milly Alcock photo card | Supergirl version Same as the Deluxe Theatrical releases with fewer accessories |
| Q2 2026 | Larfleeze | Power Battery, 2 flame effect pieces, display stand and Philip Tan and Jonathan Glapion art card | Blackest Night version |
| Q2 2026 | Starman (Jack Knight) | Cosmic staff, display stand and Andrew Robinson art card | JSA version |
| Q2 2026 | Shazam | 2 alternate hands, display stand and art card | Power of Shazam! version |
| Q2 2026 | Bronze Tiger | 2 alternate hands, display stand and Tony S. Daniel and Sandu Florea art card | New 52 version |
| Q2 2026 | OMAC | Alternate tendril arm, display stand and Renato Guedes art card | Infinite Crisis version |
| Q2 2026 | Eclipso | Alternate Heart of Darkness hand, 2 alternate hands, display stand and Brett Booth and Norm Rapmund art card | DC Classic version |
| Q3 2026 | Batman Deadman | 2 batarangs, 2 alternate hands, display stand and Giuseppe Camuncoli, Stefano Nesi, and Caspar Wijngaard art card | Knight Terrors version |
| Q3 2026 | Batman | Grappling pistol, batarang, display stand and Chris Burnham art card | New 52 version |
| Q3 2026 | Batman | Grappling hook, 4 alternate hands, display stand and Frank Miller art card | The Dark Knight Returns blue cowl version |
| Q3 2026 | Batman (Jean-Paul Valley) | Display stand and Kelley Jones art card | Batman: Knightfall version Repaint of the Gold Label version |
| Q3 2026 | Sinestro | Yellow Lantern Power Battery, 2 construct effect pieces, display stand and Frank Quitely art card | DC Classic version |
| Q3 2026 | Kid Flash (Wally West) | 2 alternate hands, 4 electricity effect pieces, display stand and Evan ‘Doc’ Shaner art card | Teen Titans version |
| Q3 2026 | Brainiac | Display stand and Curt Swan and Stan Kaye art card | DC Classic version |
| Q3 2026 | Black Adam | 2 alternate hands, display stand and art card | JSA version |
| Q3 2026 | Batman | 3 batarangs, explosive gel gun, grenade, electrical charge gun, gun, display stand and CGI art card | Batman: Arkham Knight version Repaint of the Prestige Suit Batman |
| Q3 2026 | Batman | Batarang, 2 alternate hands, display stand and Kelley Jones art card | Batman: Haunted Gotham version Repaint of Troika Batman |
| Q3 2026 | Batman | Batarang, 3 alternate hands, display stand and art card | World's Finest Comics version |

=== Build-A ===
| Release | Build-A | Figure | Accessories | Description | Build-A Piece |
|---|---|---|---|---|---|
| Q1 2020 | Batmobile | Batgirl (Barbara Gordon) | Grappling pistol, batarang, Batmobile piece, display stand and Sean Gordon Murphy art card | DC Rebirth version | Right Side |
| Q1 2020 | Batmobile | Nightwing | Eskrima sticks, Batmobile piece, display stand and Ivan Reis art card | DC Rebirth version | Middle |
| Q1 2020 | Batmobile | The Batman Who Laughs | Knife, sickle, Batmobile piece, display stand and Jock art card | Dark Nights: Metal version | Left Side |
| Fall 2020 | The Merciless (Earth -12 Batman) | Robin (Earth -22) | Display stand and Mirka Andolfo art card | Dark Nights: Metal version Three different head sculpts available | Torso |
| Fall 2020 | The Merciless (Earth -12 Batman) | Superman | Alternate hands, display stand and David Marquez art card | Year of the Villain: The Infected version | Legs |
| Fall 2020 | The Merciless (Earth -12 Batman) | Batman | Twin axes, display stand and Greg Capullo art card | Dark Nights: Metal version | Arms |
| Fall 2020 | The Merciless (Earth -12 Batman) | The Batman Who Laughs | Display stand and Tyler Kirkham art card | Sky Tyrant wings version Retool of the original The Batman Who Laughs figure | Head, scimitar and shoulder armor |
| Feb 2021 | Bane (Batman: Last Knight on Earth) | Batman | Joker's preserved head, baton, display stand and Greg Capullo art card | Batman: Last Knight on Earth version | Head and hands |
| Feb 2021 | Bane (Batman: Last Knight on Earth) | Scarecrow | Flight stand and Greg Capullo art card | Batman: Last Knight on Earth version | Torso |
| Feb 2021 | Bane (Batman: Last Knight on Earth) | Wonder Woman | Sword, display stand and Greg Capullo art card | Batman: Last Knight on Earth version | Arms |
| Feb 2021 | Bane (Batman: Last Knight on Earth) | Omega | Alternate hands, display stand and Greg Capullo art card | Batman: Last Knight on Earth version | Legs |
| Spring 2021 | Darkfather (Dark Multiverse Batman) | Wonder Woman | Chainsaw of Truth, stand and photo card | Dark Nights: Death Metal version | Head and Cape |
| Spring 2021 | Darkfather (Dark Multiverse Batman) | Superman | 2 alternate hands, stand and photo card | Dark Nights: Death Metal version | Arms |
| Spring 2021 | Darkfather (Dark Multiverse Batman) | Robin King (Dark Multiverse Robin) | 2 alternate hands, stand and photo card | Dark Nights: Death Metal version | Torso |
| Spring 2021 | Darkfather (Dark Multiverse Batman) | Batman | Guitar, stand and photo card | Dark Nights: Death Metal version Reissue of the previous Dark Nights: Death Metal Batman with new accessories | Legs |
| Sep 2021 | King Shark (The Suicide Squad) | Peacemaker | Sword, display stand and John Cena photo card | The Suicide Squad version | Arms |
| Sep 2021 | King Shark (The Suicide Squad) | Peacemaker | Throwing axe, display stand and black & white John Cena photo card | Unmasked version Target exclusive | Arms |
| Sep 2021 | King Shark (The Suicide Squad) | Bloodsport | Twin katanas, display stand and Idris Elba photo card | The Suicide Squad version | Torso |
| Sep 2021 | King Shark (The Suicide Squad) | Bloodsport | Twin katanas, display stand and black & white Idris Elba photo card | Unmasked version Walmart exclusive | Torso |
| Sep 2021 | King Shark (The Suicide Squad) | Harley Quinn | Javelin's javelin, display stand and Margot Robbie photo card | The Suicide Squad version | Legs |
| Sep 2021 | King Shark (The Suicide Squad) | Polka-Dot Man | Goggles, polka-dot energy effect piece, display stand and David Dastmalchian photo card | The Suicide Squad version | Head |
| Q1 2022 | The Dark Knight Returns Horse (The Dark Knight Returns) | Batman | 2 alternate hands, grappling hook, display stand and toy photo card | The Dark Knight Returns version | 2 front legs, and tail |
| Q1 2022 | The Dark Knight Returns Horse (The Dark Knight Returns) | Batman | 2 alternate hands, grappling hook, display stand and artist proof toy photo card | The Dark Knight Returns version Artist Proof (Chase - Platinum Edition) | 2 front legs, and tail |
| Q1 2022 | The Dark Knight Returns Horse (The Dark Knight Returns) | Robin (Carrie Kelley) | Sling shot, display stand and toy photo card | The Dark Knight Returns version | 2 body pieces |
| Q1 2022 | The Dark Knight Returns Horse (The Dark Knight Returns) | Robin (Carrie Kelley) | Sling shot, display stand and artist proof toy photo card | The Dark Knight Returns version Artist Proof (Chase - Platinum Edition) | 2 body pieces |
| Q1 2022 | The Dark Knight Returns Horse (The Dark Knight Returns) | Superman | 2 alternate hands, display stand and toy photo card | The Dark Knight Returns version | 2 rear legs |
| Q1 2022 | The Dark Knight Returns Horse (The Dark Knight Returns) | The Joker | Alternate hand, knife, display stand and toy photo card | The Dark Knight Returns version | Saddle and head |
| Q2 2022 | Frost King (Endless Winter) | Batman | Sword, batmine, display stand and toy photo card | Endless Winter version | Arms |
| Q2 2022 | Frost King (Endless Winter) | Wonder Woman | Sword, display stand and toy photo card | Endless Winter version | Torso |
| Q2 2022 | Frost King (Endless Winter) | Black Adam | 2 electricity accessories, display stand and toy photo card | Endless Winter version Redeco of King Shazam Year of the Villain: The Infected with new head | Legs |
| Q2 2022 | Frost King (Endless Winter) | Green Lantern (John Stewart) | 2 energy swords, display stand and Juan José Ryp art card | Rerelease of DC Rebirth version | Head and Cape |
| Q3 2022 | Atrocitus (Blackest Night) | Black Lantern Batman | Display stand and Ivan Reis art card | Blackest Night version | Arms |
| Q3 2022 | Atrocitus (Blackest Night) | Black Lantern Superman | Display stand and Shane Davis, Sandra Hope, Alex Sinclair art card | Blackest Night version | Legs |
| Q3 2022 | Atrocitus (Blackest Night) | Green Lantern (Kyle Rayner) | Lantern, sword, display stand and art card | Blackest Night version | Torso |
| Q3 2022 | Atrocitus (Blackest Night) | Deathstorm | Lantern, display stand and Tony S. Daniel art card | Blackest Night version | Head and shoulder pads |
| Q4 2022 | Solomon Grundy (Batman: Arkham City) | Batman | Grapple launcher, display stand and CGI card | Batman: Arkham City version Rerelease of Batman: Arkham Asylum version with new head, gauntlets and Torso emblem | Legs |
| Q4 2022 | Solomon Grundy (Batman: Arkham City) | Batman | Grapple launcher, display stand and CGI card | Walmart exclusive Black and White Edition | Legs |
| Q4 2022 | Solomon Grundy (Batman: Arkham City) | The Penguin | Umbrella, display stand and CGI card | Batman: Arkham City version | Jacket and Head |
| Q4 2022 | Solomon Grundy (Batman: Arkham City) | The Penguin | Umbrella, display stand and CGI card | Walmart exclusive Black and White Edition | Jacket and Head |
| Q4 2022 | Solomon Grundy (Batman: Arkham City) | Catwoman | Whip, display stand and CGI card | Batman: Arkham City version | Torso |
| Q4 2022 | Solomon Grundy (Batman: Arkham City) | Catwoman | Whip, display stand and CGI card | Walmart exclusive Black and White Edition | Torso |
| Q4 2022 | Solomon Grundy (Batman: Arkham City) | Ra's al Ghul | Sword, display stand and toy photo card | Batman: Arkham City version | Arms |
| Q4 2022 | Solomon Grundy (Batman: Arkham City) | Ra's al Ghul | Sword, display stand and toy photo card | Walmart exclusive Black and White Edition | Arms |
| Q4 2022 | The Darkest Knight (Dark Nights Metal: Speed Metal) | Flash (Jay Garrick) | 4 lightning effect pieces, display stand and toy photo art card | Dark Nights: Speed Metal version | Head |
| Q4 2022 | The Darkest Knight (Dark Nights Metal: Speed Metal) | Kid Flash (Ace West) | 5 lighting effect pieces, display stand and toy photo card | Dark Nights: Speed Metal version | Torso |
| Q4 2022 | The Darkest Knight (Dark Nights Metal: Speed Metal) | The Flash (Barry Allen) | 4 lighting effect pieces, display stand and toy photo art card | Dark Nights: Speed Metal version | Legs |
| Q4 2022 | The Darkest Knight (Dark Nights Metal: Speed Metal) | Wally West | 6 lightning effect pieces, display stand and toy photo art card | Dark Nights: Speed Metal version Redeco of The Flash DC Rebirth version | Arms |
| Q1 2023 | Bane (The Dark Knight Rises) | Batman | Grappling gun, 3 batarangs, display stand and Christian Bale photo card | The Dark Knight Rises version | Legs |
| Q1 2023 | Bane (The Dark Knight Rises) | The Joker | Money pile, display stand and Heath Ledger photo card | The Dark Knight version | Head and hands |
| Q1 2023 | Bane (The Dark Knight Rises) | Two-Face | Display stand and Aaron Eckhart photo card | The Dark Knight version | Torso |
| Q1 2023 | Bane (The Dark Knight Rises) | Scarecrow | Display stand and toy photo card | Batman Begins version | Arms |
| Q2 2023 | Beast Boy (New Justice) | Nightwing | Display stand and Ivan Reis art card | Blue stripes version Retool of Superman (Jonathan Kent) Future State version | Body |
| Q2 2023 | Beast Boy (New Justice) | Donna Troy | Sword, display stand and Brett Booth art card | DC Rebirth version | Arms |
| Q2 2023 | Beast Boy (New Justice) | Arsenal | Bow, quiver, arrows, display stand and Timothy Green II art card | DC Rebirth version | Legs |
| Q2 2023 | Beast Boy (New Justice) | Raven | 2 magic effect pieces, display stand and Mike McKone art card | DC Rebirth version | Head and hands |
| Fall 2023 | Mr. Freeze (Batman & Robin) | Batman | 2 ice effects, display stand and George Clooney photo card | Batman & Robin version Reissue of the figure from the Ultimate Movie Collection box set with a molded cape | Legs |
| Fall 2023 | Mr. Freeze (Batman & Robin) | Robin | 2 ice effects, display stand and Chris O'Donnell photo card | Batman & Robin version | Arms |
| Fall 2023 | Mr. Freeze (Batman & Robin) | Batgirl | Display stand and Alicia Silverstone photo card | Batman & Robin version | Head, Freeze Ray and shoulders |
| Fall 2023 | Mr. Freeze (Batman & Robin) | Poison Ivy | Display stand and Uma Thurman photo card | Batman & Robin version | Torso |
| Summer 2024 | Plastic Man | Superman Blue | 4 electricity effect pieces, display stand and Howard Porter and John Dell art card | JLA version | Torso |
| Summer 2024 | Plastic Man | Batman | Grappling pistol, display stand and Howard Porter art card | Batman: Troika version Redeco of the Three Jokers Batman | Heads and alternate elongated arms |
| Summer 2024 | Plastic Man | Aquaman | Display stand and Howard Porter art card | JLA version | Arms |
| Summer 2024 | Plastic Man | Green Lantern (John Stewart) | 2 green flame effect pieces, display stand and Neal Adams art card | Classic version | Legs |
| Q3 2024 | Nightmare Bat (Batman Forever) | Batman | 2 alternate hands, grapple launcher, batarang, sonar batarang, display stand and photo card | Batman Forever version Redeco of the Val Kilmer Batman figure from the anniversary box set | Head and display stand |
| Q3 2024 | Nightmare Bat (Batman Forever) | Robin | 4 alternate hands, display stand and photo card | Batman Forever version | Left Wing |
| Q3 2024 | Nightmare Bat (Batman Forever) | Riddler | 2 alternate hands, bomb, staff, display stand and photo card | Batman Forever version | Torso |
| Q3 2024 | Nightmare Bat (Batman Forever) | Two-Face | 2 alternate hands, display stand and photo card | Batman Forever version | Right Wing |
| Q4 2024 | Darkseid (Justice League Task Force) | Superman | 2 attack effect pieces, display stand and art card | Justice League Task Force version Retool and redeco of the Crisis On Infinite Earths Superman with a new head | Legs |
| Q4 2024 | Darkseid (Justice League Task Force) | Flash (Wally West) | 2 attack effect pieces, display stand and art card | Justice League Task Force version Retool and redeco of the Flashpoint Barry Allen with a new head | Torso |
| Q4 2024 | Darkseid (Justice League Task Force) | Aquaman | Trident, 2 attack effect pieces, display stand and art card | Justice League Task Force version Retool and redeco of the Rebirth Aquaman with a new head | Head and hands |
| Q4 2024 | Darkseid (Justice League Task Force) | Batman | 2 attack effect pieces, display stand and art card | Justice League Task Force version Redeco of the Batman from the Knightfall box set | Arms |

=== Theatrical Deluxe Figures ===
| Release | Figure | Accessories | Description |
|---|---|---|---|
| Q2 2025 | Superman | Krypto, 3 alternate faceplates, 2 alternate hands, display stand and card | Superman version Same as the single release Superman with removable face and new accessories |
| Q2 2025 | Lex Luthor | Baby Kaiju, 2 alternate hands, 3 alternate face plates, display stand and art card | Superman version |
| Q2 2025 | Mr. Terrific (Michael Holt) | 2 alternate T-Sphere hands, 3 alternate faceplates, display stand and art card | Superman version |
| Q2 2025 | Ultraman | 6 alternate hands, display stand and art card | Superman version |
| Q2 2025 | Robot #4 | Display stand and card | Superman version |
| Q3 2025 | Batman | Grappling hook pistol, batarang, 2 alternate hands and Michael Keaton, Michelle Pfeiffer and Danny DeVito movie poster card | Batman Returns version |
| Q3 2025 | Catwoman | Whip, taser, display stand and Michael Keaton, Michelle Pfeiffer and Danny DeVito movie poster card | Batman Returns version |
| Q3 2025 | Penguin | Umbrella, coat, top hat, display stand and Michael Keaton, Michelle Pfeiffer and Danny DeVito movie poster card | Batman Returns version |
| Q3 2025 | Max Shreck | Alternate charred head, display stand and Michael Keaton, Michelle Pfeiffer and Danny DeVito movie poster card | Batman Returns version |
| Q3 2025 | 3 Commando Penguins | 3 rocket packs, coat and Michael Keaton, Michelle Pfeiffer and Danny DeVito movie poster card | Batman Returns version |
| Q3 2025 | Peacemaker | Eagly, pistol, alternate unmasked head, 2 alternate helmets, display stand and John Cena photo card | Peacemaker version |
| Q1 2026 | Superman | 2 alternate heads, 7 alternate hands, alternate Kryptonian crystal hand, mini-poster with display clips, display stand and Christopher Reeve photo card | Superman: The Movie version Retool of the Collector Edition Reeve Superman with a new head and accessories |
| Q1 2026 | Joker | Pistol, machine gun, rocket launcher, knife, 4 alternate hands, mini-poster with display clips, display stand and Heath Ledger photo card | The Dark Knight version Repaint of the previous Ledger Joker with new accessories |
| Q1 2026 | Bane | 4 alternate hands, mini-poster with display clips, display stand and Tom Hardy photo card | The Dark Knight Rises version Repaint of the previous Hardy Bane with new accessories |
| Q2 2026 | Supergirl | Krypto, sword, alternate faceplate, 2 alternate hands, display stand and Milly Alcock photo card | Supergirl version |
| Q2 2026 | Lobo | Hook, alternate head, 5 alternate hands, display stand and Jason Momoa photo card | Supergirl version |
| Q2 2026 | Krem of the Yellow Hills | Axe, blaster, alternate head, 2 alternate hands, display stand and Matthias Schoenaerts photo card | Supergirl version |
| Q2 2026 | Supergirl (Coat) | Krypto, coat, display stand and Milly Alcock photo card | Supergirl version Retool of the initial Supergirl figure with an alternate head, coat and accessories |
| Q2 2026 | Supergirl | Alternate head, 6 alternate hands, display stand and Melissa Benoist photo card | Supergirl (Arrowverse) version |
| Q3 2026 | Batman | Batarang, grappling pistol, 3 alternate hands, alternate unmasked head, display stand and Robert Pattinson photo card | The Batman version Repaint of the previous The Batman figure |
| Q3 2026 | Battle-Damaged Catwoman | Whip, taser, alternate head, display stand and Michael Keaton, Michelle Pfeiffer and Danny DeVito movie poster card | Batman Returns version Retool of the previous Michelle Pfeiffer Catwoman with a new head |
| Q3 2026 | Commissioner Gordon | Pistol, handcuffs, file folder, 2 alternate hands, display stand and movie poster card | The Dark Knight version |

==== Box Sets & Vehicles ====
| Release | Set | Figure | Accessories | Description |
|---|---|---|---|---|
| 2025 | The Penguin and the Duck | Penguin | Display stand and art card | Batman Returns version |
| 2025 | The Penguin and the Duck | The Duck | | Batman Returns version |

=== Mega Figures ===
Figures of larger characters that retail at a higher price point.

| Release | Figure | Accessories | Description |
|---|---|---|---|
| Q2 2021 | Darkseid | Spear, display stand and CGI render card | Zack Snyder's Justice League version |
| Q2 2021 | Steppenwolf | Battle axe, display stand and CGI render card | Zack Snyder's Justice League version |
| Q4 2021 | Joker Titan | Display stand and photo card | Batman: Arkham Asylum version |
| Q4 2021 | Clayface | Display stand and photo card | DC Rebirth version |
| Q4 2021 | Swamp Thing | Alternate hand, display stand, and photo card | DC Rebirth version |
| Q2 2022 | Killer Croc | Display stand, and photo card | Batman: Arkham Asylum version |
| Q2 2022 | Man-Bat | Display stand, and photo card | DC Rebirth version |
| Q2 2022 | Atom Smasher | Display stand, and Kaare Andrews art card | Black Adam version |
| Q2 2022 | Sabbac | Display stand, and photo card | Black Adam version |
| Q3 2022 | Bane | Display stand, and Dan LuVisi art card | Batman: Knightfall version |
| Q3 2022 | Nekron | Scythe, display stand, and Ivan Reis art card | Blackest Night version |
| Q1 2023 | Frankenstein | Sword, display stand, and card | Seven Soldiers version |
| Q1 2023 | Mongul | Display stand, and Billy Tan art card | Superman: Villains version |
| Q2 2023 | Kalibak | Beta Club, display stand and art card | Darkseid War version |
| Q2 2023 | Fulcum Abominus | 6 wing pieces, display stand and art card | Dark Nights: Metal version |
| Q3 2023 | Anti-Monitor | Display stand and George Pérez and Tom Ziuko art card | Crisis on Infinite Earths version |
| Q3 2023 | Justice Buster | Display stand and Scott Snyder and Greg Capullo art card | Batman: Endgame version |
| Q3 2023 | Carapax | Alternate hands, display stand and Tiago Ribeiro art card | Blue Beetle version |
| Q4 2023 | Sunken Citadel Pirate | Display stand and art card | Aquaman and the Lost Kingdom version |
| Summer 2024 | Doomsday | Display stand and Shane Davis, Matt Banning, and Alex Sinclair art card | Superman/Batman Kryptonite-infused version Retool of the Doomsday from the Death of Superman box set with a new head |
| Q3 2024 | Darkseid | Alternate Omega beam head, alternate hands, cape, display stand and José Luis García-López art card | Super Powers Collection version |
| Q4 2024 | Red Swamp Thing | 2 alternate hands, display stand and Stephen R. Bissette art card | Mysteries in Space version Retool and repaint of the previous Swamp Thing |
| Q3 2025 | Final Batsuit | Display stand and card | New Justice version |
| Q3 2025 | Kaiju | Display stand and card | Superman version |
| Q4 2025 | Failsafe | Blaster, display base, display stand and Mikel Janin art card | Absolute Power version |

=== Mega Figures (12" Statue) ===
| Release | Figure | Accessories | Description |
|---|---|---|---|
| Q2 2022 | Batman 12" | Display stand, and photo card | The Batman version |
| Q2 2022 | The Riddler 12" | Display stand, and photo card | The Batman version |
| Q2 2023 | Batman 12" | Display stand and Jim Lee art card | Batman: Hush version |
| Q2 2023 | Batman 12" | Display stand and art card | The Flash version |
| Q2 2023 | The Flash 12" | Display stand and art card | The Flash version |
| Q3 2023 | Superman 12" | Display stand and Jim Lee, Scott Williams, and Alex Sinclair art card | Superman for Tomorrow version |
| Q4 2023 | Aquaman 12" | Display stand and art card | Aquaman and the Lost Kingdom version |
| Q4 2023 | Black Manta 12" | Display stand and art card | Aquaman and the Lost Kingdom version |

=== Box Sets & Vehicles ===
| Release | Set | Figure | Accessories | Description |
|---|---|---|---|---|
| 2020 | Bat-Raptor | | Jock art card | Dark Nights: Metal version |
| Spring 2021 | Superman vs. The Devastator | Superman | Photo card and rocky terrain display base | Retool of the Action Comics #1000 Superman with a new head |
| Spring 2021 | Superman vs. The Devastator | The Devastator | Photo card | Retool of the initial Devastator figure with a new head |
| Q2 2021 | Batcycle | | Art card | Dark Nights: Death Metal version |
| Q2 2021 | White Knight Batcycle | | Photo card | White Knight version |
| Q3 2021 | Green Lantern (Hal Jordan) vs. Dawnbreaker | Green Lantern (Hal Jordan) | 3 lantern projections, display stand, combined display stand, and photo card | Exclusive Hal Jordan head on Redeco of the DC Rebirth Green Lantern (John Stewart) figure |
| Q3 2021 | Green Lantern (Hal Jordan) vs. Dawnbreaker | Dawnbreaker | Display stand, and photo card | Rerelease of the initial Dawnbreaker figure |
| Q1 2022 | Batman vs. Azrael | Batman | 2 swords, grappling hook and line, sword sheath, display stand, combined display stand, and photo card | Batman: Curse of the White Knight version without cape |
| Q1 2022 | Batman vs. Azrael | Azrael | Sword, display stand, and photo card | Batman: Curse of the White Knight version |
| Q2 2022 | Batman vs. Hush | Batman | 2 Batarangs, display stand, combined display stand with grave piece, and photo card | Batman: Hush version |
| Q2 2022 | Batman vs. Hush | Hush | Shovel, display stand, and photo card | Batman: Hush version Alternate head and brown gloves |
| Q2 2022 | Batmobeast | | Photo card | Dark Nights: Death Metal version |
| Q2 2022 | Batcycle | | Alternate Batman hand, display stand, and photo card | The Batman version |
| Q2 2022 | Drifter Motorcycle | | Helmet, display stand, and photo card | The Batman version |
| Q3 2022 | The Joker Dragon | | Display stand and photo card | Dark Nights: Metal version |
| Q3 2022 | Blue Beetle & Booster Gold | Blue Beetle (Ted Kord) | Drone, grapple launcher, display stand, combined display stand, and Álvaro Martínez Bueno art card | Justice League International version |
| Q3 2022 | Blue Beetle & Booster Gold | Booster Gold | Blast effect, cell phone, display stand, and Dan Jurgens art card | 52 version |
| Q2 2023 | Batmobile | | Art card | The Flash version |
| Q2 2023 | Batcycle | | Art card | The Flash version |
| Q3 2023 | Batman and Spawn | Batman | Batarang, alternate hands, display base, art backdrop, display stand and Todd McFarlane art | Spawn/Batman version |
| Q3 2023 | Batman and Spawn | Spawn | Sword, display stand and Todd McFarlane art card | Spawn/Batman version |
| Q4 2023 | Batman: The Ultimate Movie Collection | Batman (Michael Keaton) | Bat-Signal with four swappable logo plates, display stand and art card | Batman version Reissue of the Batmobile Batman version with a new cloth cape |
| Q4 2023 | Batman: The Ultimate Movie Collection | Batman (Val Kilmer) | Bat-Signal with four swappable logo plates, display stand and art card | Batman Forever version |
| Q4 2023 | Batman: The Ultimate Movie Collection | Batman (George Clooney) | Bat-Signal with four swappable logo plates, display stand and art card | Batman & Robin version |
| Q4 2023 | Batman: The Ultimate Movie Collection | Batman (Christian Bale) | Bat-Signal with four swappable logo plates, display stand and art card | The Dark Knight version Reissue of the previous Dark Knight Batman figure with a new cloth cape |
| Q4 2023 | Batman: The Ultimate Movie Collection | Batman (Ben Affleck) | Bat-Signal with four swappable logo plates, display stand and art card | Justice League version Reissue of the previous DCEU Batman figure with a new cloth cape |
| Q4 2023 | Batman: The Ultimate Movie Collection | Batman (Robert Pattinson) | Bat-Signal with four swappable logo plates, display stand and art card | The Batman version Reissue of the previous The Batman figure with a new cloth cape |
| Q4 2023 | Storm | | Scepter, display stand and art card | Aquaman and the Lost Kingdom version |
| Q4 2023 | Batman Beyond vs. Justice Lord Superman | Batman (Terry McGinnis) | 2 Batarangs, alternate hands, display stand, Francis Manapul art card, cardback and Batcave display base | Kryptonite Armor version |
| Q4 2023 | Batman Beyond vs. Justice Lord Superman | Justice Lord Superman | Alternate hands, display stand and Dexter Soy and Veronica Gandini art card | Batman Beyond 2.0 version |
| Q4 2023 | Bizarro & Batzarro | Bizarro | 2 alternate hands, necklace, Ed McGuinness & Dexter Vines art card, and display base (reuse from Devastator and Superman box set) | Redeco of The Dark Knight Returns version with alternate head and emblem |
| Q4 2023 | Bizarro & Batzarro | Batzarro | 2 alternate hands, and Ed McGuinness & Dexter Vines art card | Redeco of The Dark Knight Returns version with alternate head and emblem |
| Q2 2024 | The Joker & Punchline | The Joker | Knife, display stand and Andy Kubert and Edgar Delgado art card | Retool of the Infinite Frontier Joker with a new head |
| Q2 2024 | The Joker & Punchline | Punchline | Knife, display stand and Stanley 'Artgerm' Lau art card | Infinite Frontier version |
| Q3 2024 | Batman vs Bane | Batman | 4 alternate hands, batarang, display stand, Kelley Jones signed art card | Retool and redeco of Batman: Knightfall version with a new head |
| Q3 2024 | Batman vs Bane | Bane | 2 alternate hands, and display stand | Batman: Knightfall version Redeco of the Gold Label Bane |
| Q4 2024 | Batmobile and Alfred Pennyworth | Batmobile | Lights and sounds | Batman Forever version |
| Q4 2024 | Batmobile and Alfred Pennyworth | Alfred Pennyworth | Display stand and photo card | Batman Forever version |
| Q4 2024 | Red Hood's sportsbike | | Display stand and photo card | Dawn of DC version |
| Q4 2024 | Doomsday & Superman | Doomsday | Display stand and CGI render card | Batman v Superman: Dawn of Justice version |
| Q4 2024 | Doomsday & Superman | Superman | 4 alternate hands, Kryptonite spear, display stand and Henry Cavill photo card | Batman v Superman: Dawn of Justice version Red and blue repaint of the Zack Snyder's Justice League Superman |
| Q4 2024 | Batmobile | | Flight stand, lights and sounds, and card | Batman Beyond version |
| Q4 2024 | Joker and Murray Franklin | Joker | Pistol, notebook, 4 alternate hands, 3 alternate faceplates, chair, Joaquin Phoenix photo card and 4 life-size movie prop replicas | Joker version |
| Q4 2024 | Joker and Murray Franklin | Murray Franklin | Desk, chair, coffee mug, microphone, potted plant and talkshow diorama backdrop | Joker version |
| Q4 2024 | Batman and Zoom | Batman (Thomas Wayne) | 2 guns, alternate unmasked head, sword, rubble display base, tombstone and Andy Kubert art card | Flashpoint version Reissue of the previous Flashpoint Batman |
| Q4 2024 | Batman and Zoom | Professor Zoom | Alternate unmasked head, lighting rod and Andy Kubert art card | Flashpoint version |
| Q4 2024 | Batman vs. King Kong | King Kong | Miniature Batman, alternate head and E.M. Gist art card | Justice League vs. Godzilla vs. Kong version |
| Q4 2024 | Batman vs. King Kong | Batman | Display stand | Justice League vs. Godzilla vs. Kong version Retool of the Hush Batman with a new head |
| Q4 2024 | Batmobile | | Lights and sounds | Batman & Robin version |
| Q2 2025 | Flash vs. Titano | Titano | Christian Duce art card | Justice League vs. Godzilla vs. Kong version Retool of King Kong with a new head and cyborg arm |
| Q2 2025 | Flash vs. Titano | The Flash (Barry Allen) | Display stand and Christian Duce art card | Justice League vs. Godzilla vs. Kong version Retool of the DC Rebirth Flash with a new head |
| Q3 2025 | Superman vs. Godzilla | Godzilla | Miniature Superman and card | Justice League vs. Godzilla vs. Kong version |
| Q3 2025 | Superman vs. Godzilla | Superman | Display stand | Justice League vs. Godzilla vs. Kong version |
| Q3 2025 | Atomic Blast Godzilla vs. Wonder Woman | Godzilla | Miniature Wonder Woman and Jim Lee / Jonboy Meyers art card | Justice League vs. Godzilla vs. Kong Atomic Blast version Redeco of the previous Godzilla |
| Q3 2025 | Atomic Blast Godzilla vs. Wonder Woman | Wonder Woman | Lasso of Truth and display stand | DC Rebirth version Retool of the 1984 Wonder Woman with a new comic head and skirt |
| Q3 2025 | The Batman Who Laughs and the Merciless | Batman Who Laughs | Massive display base | Dark Nights: Death Metal version |
| Q3 2025 | The Batman Who Laughs and the Merciless | The Merciless (Earth -12 Batman) | Sword | Dark Nights: Metal version Retool and red redeco of the Merciless BAF with a new unmasked head |
| Q4 2025 | Batmobile | | | DC Rebirth version |
| Q4 2025 | Batman and Batcycle | Batman (DCEU) | 2 alternate hands and card | The Flash version Rerelease of the previous blue and gray Flash Batman |
| Q4 2025 | Batman and Batcycle | Batcycle | Stand | The Flash version Rerelease of the previous Flash Batcycle |
| Q4 2025 | Atom Smasher and Spectre | Atom Smasher | Display stand and art card | JSA version Retool of the Black Adam movie Atom Smasher Mega Figure with a new head, chest and arms |
| Q4 2025 | Atom Smasher and Spectre | Spectre | Display stand and card | JSA version |
| Q2 2026 | Superman vs. Mongul | Superman | 2 guns, 4 alternate hands, display stand and art card | The Return of Superman version |
| Q2 2026 | Superman vs. Mongul | Mongul | Display stand and art card | The Return of Superman version Repaint of the Mongul Mega Figure |
| Q2 2026 | Lobo's Spacehog | | Art card | Supergirl version |
| Q3 2026 | Red Lantern Corps | Atrocitus | Dex-Starr, display stand and Shane Davis and Sandra Hope art card | Repaint of the Collect to Build Atrocitus |
| Q3 2026 | Red Lantern Corps | Red Lantern Guy Gardner | Power Battery, alternate Fury-6 head, alternate Veon head, 2 alternate hands, display stand and Ed Benes and Rob Hunter art card | Red Lanterns version |

=== Exclusives (Pre-Gold Label) ===
==== Standard figures ====
| Release | Figure | Accessories | Exclusivity | Description |
|---|---|---|---|---|
| Q2 2020 | Red Hood (Jason Todd) | 2 pistols, display stand and Tyler Kirkham art card | Walgreens | New 52 version |
| Q2 2020 | The Grim Knight | Machine gun, grenade launcher, display stand and Tyler Kirkham art card | Walmart | The Batman Who Laughs version |
| Winter 2020 | Batman (Thomas Wayne) | 2 pistols, display stand and Jason Fabok art card | Target | Flashpoint version |
| Q1 2021 | Batman | Display stand and photo card | GameStop | Gold Hellbat armor version Redeco of the Wave 1 Hellbat figure |
| Q1 2021 | Batman | Grappling hook and line, display stand and Sean Gordon Murphy art card | Target | Batman: White Knight red costume variant Redeco of the initial White Knight Batman |
| Q2 2021 | Batman | Batarang, grappling hook, stand, and black and white Ben Affleck photo card | Entertainment Earth | Zack Snyder's Justice League version Unmasked version |
| Q2 2021 | Batman | Batarang, grappling hook, stand, and black and white Ben Affleck photo card | GameStop | Zack Snyder's Justice League version Unmasked version |
| Q3 2021 | Superman | Flight stand and black and white Henry Cavill photo card | Target | Redeco of Zack Snyder's Justice League version Red and blue version |
| Q3 2021 | Heavy Metal Batman | 2 Axes, stand and photo card | Target | Cover Edition (Battle Damage) |
| Q3 2021 | Cyborg | Black and white Ray Fisher photo card | Walmart | Zack Snyder's Justice League alternate helmeted version |
| Q4 2021 | Joker (The Comedian) | Crowbar, camera, display stand, and photo card | GameStop | Three Jokers version |
| Q4 2021 | Speed Force Flash | Display stand and photo card | Target | NYCC |
| Q4 2021 | Inque as Batman Beyond | Batarang, 2 alternate hands, flight stand and photo card | Target | Batman Beyond version Blue Redeco of Batman Beyond mouth version |
| Q1 2022 | Bruce Wayne (Drifter) | Backpack, display stand, and photo card | Target | The Batman version Unmasked version |
| Q1 2022 | Batman of Zur-En-Arrh | Baseball bat, knife, display stand and photo card | Target | Batman RIP version |
| Q2 2022 | Batman (Terry McGinnis) | Batarang, alternate hands, 2 jet exhaust pieces, flight stand and photo card | Entertainment Earth | Batman Beyond version Digitized Damage variant (Glow in the Dark) |
| Q2 2022 | Wonder Woman | Chainsaw of Truth, stand and photo card | Walmart | Gold Redeco of the Dark Nights: Death Metal version with alternate head |
| Q2 2022 | The Flash (Wally West) | 6 lightning effect pieces, display stand and Brett Booth art card | Walmart | Redeco of The Flash DC Rebirth version with alternate head |
| Q2 2022 | The Joker | Axe, display stand and photo card | Walmart | Batman: Death of the Family version Redeco of The Joker (The Clown) Three Jokers version Alternate head sculpt |

==== Build-A ====
| Release | Build-A | Figure | Accessories | Exclusivity | Description | Build-A Piece |
|---|---|---|---|---|---|---|
| Q1 2021 | Joker Bot (The New 52: Futures End) | Batman (Terry McGinnis) | 2 Batarangs, alternate hands, display stand, and photo card | Target | Batman Beyond version Mouthless mask version | Torso |
| Q2 2021 | Joker Bot (The New 52: Futures End) | Shriek | Sonic blast effect piece, display stand and photo card | Target | Batman Beyond version | Arms |
| Q3 2021 | Joker Bot (The New 52: Futures End) | Batwoman (Elainna Grayson) | 2 Batarangs, alternate hands, display stand and photo card | Target | Batman Beyond version | Legs |
| Q4 2021 | Joker Bot (The New 52: Futures End) | Blight | Alternate hand, display stand, photo card | Target | Batman Beyond version | Wings |
| Q1 2022 | Starro (Crime Syndicate) | Superman of Earth-3 (Ultraman) | Starro spore, display stand and toy photo card | Target | Infinite Frontier version | Head/Face |
| Q2 2022 | Starro (Crime Syndicate) | Superwoman | Starro spore, display stand and toy photo card | Target | Infinite Frontier version | Torso |
| Q3 2022 | Starro (Crime Syndicate) | Owlman | Starro spore, display stand and toy photo card | Target | Infinite Frontier version | Arms |
| Q4 2022 | Starro (Crime Syndicate) | Emerald Knight | Starro spore, display stand and CGI card | Target | Infinite Frontier version | Legs |

==== Box Sets & Vehicles ====
| Release | Set | Figure | Accessories | Exclusivity | Description |
|---|---|---|---|---|---|
| Fall 2020 | The Flash vs. The Red Death | The Flash (Barry Allen) | Rock display base, display stand and foil Karl Kerschl art card | Amazon | DC Rebirth version Retool of the DC Rebirth The Flash with a new head |
| Fall 2020 | The Flash vs. The Red Death | The Red Death (Earth -52 Batman) | Display stand and foil Jason Fabok art card | Amazon | Dark Nights: Metal version Exclusive |
| Nov 2020 | Batman vs. The Joker | Batman | Grappling gun, batarang, folded batarang, grenade, display stand and CGI art card | Walmart | Batman: Arkham Asylum battle damaged version Redeco of the previous Batman: Arkham Asylum Batman figure |
| Nov 2020 | Batman vs. The Joker | Joker | Pistol, 2 wind-up chattering teeth, display stand and CGI art card | Walmart | Batman: Arkham Asylum battle damaged version Redeco of the previous Batman: Arkham Asylum Joker figure |

==== Mega Figures ====
| Release | Figure | Accessories | Exclusivity | Description |
|---|---|---|---|---|
| Q4 2021 | Swamp Thing | Alternate hand, display stand, and photo card | GameStop | DC Rebirth Version; Alternate Head |

=== Fan Vote Winners ===
| Release | Figure | Accessories | Description |
|---|---|---|---|
| 2025 | Jade | 2 flame effect pieces, display stand and Adam Hughes art card | JSA version Beat out Guardian, Eradicator and Bizarro in a New York Comic-Con 2024 poll |

=== Gold Label Collection ===
==== Standard figures ====
| Release | Figure | Accessories | Exclusivity | Description |
|---|---|---|---|---|
| Q1 2021 | Batman | Night-vision goggles, 2 knives, display stand and Todd McFarlane art card | Walmart | Original design by Todd McFarlane; Redeco of general release version |
| Q2 2021 | The Flash (Earth -52) | Display stand, and recolored Jason Fabok art card | Walmart | Dark Nights: Metal Reverse-Flash version Gold Redeco of the Amazon exclusive Red Death |
| Q3 2021 | Azrael (Michael Lane) | Sword, Flame sheath, display stand, and photo card | Walmart | Suit of Sorrows Redeco of original Azrael |
| Q3 2021 | Red Hood (Jason Todd) | Crowbar, flame sword, sword, display stand, and photo card | Walmart | Unmasked New 52 version of original Walgreens exclusive |
| Q4 2021 | Azrael Batman Armor | Display stand and photo card | Walmart | Batman: Curse of the White Knight; Silver Redeco of Azrael Batman Armor |
| Q4 2021 | Superman (Energized) | Display stand, and photo card | Walmart | Redeco of Superman Unchained version |
| Q4 2021 | Batman (Hazmat Suit) | Display stand and photo card | Target | Justice League Rebirth; Light-up logo version |
| Q2 2022 | Robin Unmasked | Sword, display stand, and photo card | McFarlane Toys Store | Infinite Frontier version Unmasked version |
| Q2 2022 | Wonder Woman | Sword, lasso, shield, display stand and photo card | Walmart | Original design by Todd McFarlane; Redeco of general release version |
| Q2 2022 | Batman of Zur-En-Arrh | Baseball bat, knife, display stand and photo card | McFarlane Toys Store | Batman RIP version Unmasked version |
| Q2 2022 | Catwoman | Whip, display stand, and foil photo card | Walmart | The Batman version Film accurate mask |
| Q3 2022 | Martian Manhunter | Display stand, and photo card | Target | DC Classic version Redeco of the DC Rebirth version with alternate chest piece |
| Q3 2022 | Red Hood | 2 alternate hands, 2 effects, display stand and CGI art card | McFarlane Toys Store | Batman: Arkham Knight version |
| Q3 2022 | Scarecrow | Display stand and CGI art card | McFarlane Toys Store | Batman: Arkham Knight version |
| Q3 2022 | Batman Dark Detective (No Jacket) | Grapple hook, display stand, and Gabriele Dell'Otto art card | Target | Future State version |
| Q3 2022 | Lex Luthor (Power Suit) | Alternate hands, flight display stand and photo card | Target | DC Rebirth Blue Version |
| Q3 2022 | Parallax | Power Battery construct, 2 flame effect pieces, display stand and Ron Wagner art card | Walmart | Emerald Twilight version |
| Q3 2022 | Ocean Master | Trident, display stand and Joe Prado and Ivan Reis art card | Target | New 52 Version; Redeco of Endless Winter Aquaman with alternate head, belt and cape |
| Q3 2022 | Batman (Jean-Paul Valley) | Display stand and Kelley Jones art card | Walmart | Batman: Knightfall version |
| Q3 2022 | Shazam | 2 alternate hands, 2 lightning effects, display stand and art card | Walmart | DC Rebirth version |
| Q3 2022 | Dark Flash | 2 lightning effects, display stand and toy photo card | Walmart | Dark Nights: Speed Metal version Roar mouth version |
| Q3 2022 | Dark Flash | 2 lightning effects, display stand and toy photo card | Walmart | Dark Nights: Speed Metal version Grin mouth version (TBA) |
| Q3 2022 | Dark Flash | 2 lightning effects, display stand and toy photo card | Walmart | Dark Nights: Speed Metal version Snarl mouth version (TBA) |
| Q3 2022 | Robin (Tim Drake) | Bo staff, display stand and José Luis García-López art card | Amazon | One Year Later version |
| Q3 2022 | Superman | 2 alternate hands, Kryptonite infused poison ivy, display stand and Jim Lee, Scott Williams, and Alex Sinclair art card | McFarlane Toys Store | Batman: Hush version Repurpose of DC Rebirth version with alternate head and cape |
| Q3 2022 | Kid Flash (Ace West) | 2 alternate hands, four lighting effects, display stand and Jim Lee art card | McFarlane Toys Store | DC Rebirth version Retool of Superman (Jonathan Kent) Future State version |
| Q4 2022 | Deathstroke | Staff, art card, and display stand | Target | Defiance version Redeco of DC Rebirth version with cape |
| Q4 2022 | Wonder Woman | Axe, display stand and card | Target | Redeco of Endless Winter version |
| Q4 2022 | Green Lantern (Kyle Rayner) | Armor construct, sword construct, display stand and Darryl Banks art card | Target | Changing the Guard version Retool and Redeco of the Blackest Night version with new gauntlets and boots |
| Q1 2023 | Deadman | 3 astral effect pieces, display stand and Ryan Sook art card | Target | DC Rebirth version |
| Q1 2023 | Batman | Axe, display stand and Francesco Mattina art card | Walmart | DC vs. Vampires version Retool of Batman: Hush version |
| Q1 2023 | Eradicator | 2 alternate hands, display stand and art card | Walmart | Shock Wave version Redeco with alternate head and cape sculpts of DC Rebirth version |
| Q1 2023 | Blue Lantern Kyle Rayner | 2 lantern effects, Lantern, display stand and Francis Manapul art card | McFarlane Toys Store | War of the Green Lanterns version Redeco of the Blackest Night version |
| Q2 2023 | The Joker | Mallet, display stand and Dave Wilkins art card | Walmart | Three Jokers version with alternate head sculpt |
| Q2 2023 | Impulse | 4 electricity effect pieces, display stand and Howard Porter art card | Target | Young Justice version |
| Q2 2023 | Robin (Dick Grayson) | Grapple gun, 6 alternate hands, display stand and Jim Lee art card | McFarlane Toys Store | DC Classic version Retool of the Carrie Kelley Robin figure with a new head and pelvis |
| Q2 2023 | Beast Boy | Alternate bird form, display stand and George Perez art card | Walmart | Titans L.A. version Retool of Superman (Jonathan Kent) Future State version |
| Q2 2023 | Batman (1989) | Batarang, alternate hands, grappling hook gun, display stand and art card | Target | The Flash version Unmasked variant |
| Q3 2023 | Captain Atom | 2 energy effect pieces, display stand and Freddie Williams II art card | Walmart | Justice League International version |
| Q3 2023 | Superman | 2 alternate hands, display stand and Francesco Mattina art card | Walmart | DC vs. Vampires version Redeco of Batman: Hush version |
| Q3 2023 | Yellow Lantern Batman | Display stand and art card | Target | Forever Evil version Retool of Batman: Arkham Knight (Earth-2) version |
| Q3 2023 | The Joker (Bank Robber) | Display stand and art card | McFarlane Toys Store | The Dark Knight version |
| Q3 2023 | The Joker (Sonar) | Display stand and art card | McFarlane Toys Store | The Dark Knight version |
| Q3 2023 | Bane (with Coat) | Soft goods coat | McFarlane Toys Store | The Dark Knight Rises version |
| Q3 2023 | Blue Beetle (Ted Kord) | Scarab, grappling gun, 4 alternate hands, display stand and Chris Batista art card | Target | DC Classic version Retool of the two-pack version with a new head |
| Q3 2023 | Dread Lantern | Flaming sword, display stand and Mike Perkins art card | SDCC / McFarlane Toys Store | Tales from the Dark Multiverse version Retool of the Day of Vengeance version |
| Q3 2023 | Catman | 2 alternate hands, 2 knives, 2 claws, display stand, and J. G. Jones art card | McFarlane Toys Store | Villains United version Retool of Batman: Knightfall version |
| Q4 2023 | The Flash (Speed Force Variant) | Display stand, 4 lightning effect pieces, and art card | McFarlane Toys Store | The Flash version, Redeco with film accurate darker red suit |
| Q4 2023 | Joker (The Comedian) | Crowbar, camera, display stand, and photo card | TBA | Three Jokers Redeco version |
| Q4 2023 | Joker (Jail Cell) | Display stand and Heath Ledger photo card | TBA | The Dark Knight Redeco version without jacket |
| Q4 2023 | Supergirl | Flight stand, display stand and Emanuela Lupacchino and Michael Atiyeh art card | Target | DC Rebirth version |
| Q4 2023 | Black Lightning | 2 alternate hands, display stand and Ed Benes art card | Walmart | Final Crisis version Retool of Superman: Speeding Bullets version |
| Q4 2023 | Vampire Hal Jordan | Flame construct, display stand and Francesco Mattina art card | Walmart | DC vs. Vampires version Retool of the previous Hal Jordan with a new head |
| Q4 2023 | Aquaman (Stealth Suit) | Topo, display stand and art card | Target | Aquaman and the Lost Kingdom version Translucent recast of the standard Stealth Suit Aquaman |
| Q4 2023 | Waverider | 4 effect pieces, 2 alternate hands, display stand and art card | Target | Convergence version |
| Q4 2023 | Midnighter | 2 alternate hands, 2 batons, display stand and Bryan Hitch art card | Target | DC You version |
| Q4 2023 | Animal Man | Alternate claw hand, 3 alternate hands, wolverine, display stand and art card | Target | DC Classic version |
| Q4 2023 | Red Tornado | Tornado effect piece, 2 alternate hands, display stand and Brett Booth art card | Target | Justice League of America version |
| Q1 2024 | The Rival | 4 alternate hands, 4 speed force effects, display stand and art card | Target | Injustice Society version Retool of the Jay Garrick figure with a new head |
| Q1 2024 | Batgirl (Cassandra Cain) | Batarang, grappling gun, display stand and Andy Clarke art card | Target | Batgirls version Retool of Batgirl (Barbara Gordon) with new head and cloth cape |
| Q1 2024 | Flash (Wally West) | 4 lightning effect pieces, display stand and Javier Rodríguez art card | Walmart | Infinite Frontier version Retool of the Rebirth Barry Allen Flash with a new head |
| Q1 2024 | Vampire Nightwing | 2 eskrima sticks, display stand and Warren Louw art card | Walmart | DC vs. Vampires version Retool of the Rebirth Nightwing with a new head |
| Q2 2024 | Mister Zsasz | Knife, display stand and Brian Bolland art card | McFarlane Toys Store | DC Classic version Retool of the Blue Beetle with new head and feet |
| Q3 2024 | Fire | 2 flame effect pieces, display stand, and Ed Benes art card | Target | Justice League International version |
| Q3 2024 | Metallo | Kryptonite, display stand, and Gary Frank and Brad Anderson art card | Target | Superman: Secret Origin version Heavy retool of the New 52 Lex Luthor figure |
| Q3 2024 | Superman Memorial Statue | Bald eagle, display base and Tom Grummett, Doug Hazlewood, and Glenn Whitmore art card | San Diego Comic-Con | The Death of Superman version Gold repaint of the Action Comics #1000 Superman |
| Q3 2024 | Max Mercury | 4 electricity effect pieces, display stand and Ethan Van Sciver art card | Walmart | DC Classic version |
| Q3 2024 | Vampire Shazam | Display stand and Alan Quah art card | Walmart | DC vs. Vampires version Retool of the New 52 Shazam with a new head, hands, cape and chest emblem |
| Q4 2024 | Citizen Steel | 4 alternate hands, display stand and Alex Ross art card | Target | JSA version |
| Q4 2024 | Parallax Sinestro | Parallax construct, display stand and Doug Mahnke art card | Target | Wrath of the First Lantern version Retool and redeco of the original Parallax with a new head |
| Q4 2024 | Superman | 2 alternate hands, display stand and Jorge Jiménez art card | Walmart | Action Comics version Redeco of the Action Comics #1000 Superman with a new cloth cape and S-symbol |
| Q4 2024 | Green Lantern (Hal Jordan) | Jetpack construct, green flame effect piece, display stand and Carlos Pacheco art card | Walmart | Green Lanterns version Retool of the 2-pack Hal Jordan with a new head |
| Q1 2025 | Orion | Astro-Harness, display stand and John Byrne art card | Target | New Gods version |
| Q1 2025 | Wildcat | Display stand and card | Target | JSA version |
| Q2 2025 | Icon | Alternate hands, display stand and Doug Braithwaite art card | McFarlane Toys Store | Milestone Returns version |
| Q2 2025 | Fear Toxin Batman | Batarang, grappling pistol, alternate hands, display stand and Christian Bale photo card | Target | Batman Begins version Retool of the Batman Begins Batman with a new, monstrous head |
| Q2 2025 | Justice Lord Batman | Batarang, display stand and card | Target | The Multiversity version |
| Q2 2025 | Green Arrow (Connor Hawke) | Bow, quiver, arrow bundle, display stand and Ejikure art card | Target | JLA version |
| Q2 2025 | Hourman | Display stand and Murphy Anderson art card | Target | JSA version |
| Q2 2025 | Commissioner Gordon | Display stand and Joe Quinones art card | Walmart | Batman: Year One version |
| Q2 2025 | Batman | Display stand and David Mazzucchelli and Richmond Lewis art card | Walmart | Batman: Year One version |
| Q2 2025 | Bizarro | Medal, 2 alternate hands, display stand and card | GameStop | DC Classic version |
| Q3 2025 | Sandman (Wesley Dodds) | Gas gun, display stand and Riley Rossmo art card | Target | JSA version |
| Q3 2025 | Mister Miracle | 2 aero-discs, display stand and Mitch Gerads art card | Target | New Gods version |
| Q3 2025 | Superman | 2 alternate hands, display stand and art card | Target | Superman battle-damaged version Redeco of the previous movie Superman |
| Q3 2025 | Superman | Display stand and Jim Lee art card | Target | New 52 version |
| Q3 2025 | Cyborg Superman | 2 alternate hands, display stand and Ivan Reis art card | Target | Revenge of the Green Lanterns version Repaint of the Reign of the Supermen Cyborg Superman figure |
| Q3 2025 | Static | Trash can lid, 2 electricity effect pieces, display stand and Denys Cowan art card | McFarlane Toys Store | Trial by Fire version |
| Q2 2026 | Batman | Batarang, grappling gun, alternate unmasked head, alternate head, display stand and Ben Affleck photo card | Gamestop | Justice League version Repaint of the previous Justice League Batman with a new unmasked head |
| Q2 2026 | Ultraviolet Lantern John Stewart | Energy effect piece, flame effect piece, display stand and Jorge Jimenez art card | San Diego Comic-Con | New Justice version Repaint of classic John Stewart |
| Q2 2026 | White Lantern Kyle Rayner | Energy effect piece, flame effect piece, display stand and Aaron Kuder art card | San Diego Comic-Con | Green Lantern: New Guardians version Repaint of Blackest Night Kyle Rayner |
| Q2 2026 | White Lantern Hal Jordan | Energy effect piece, flame effect piece, display stand and art card | San Diego Comic-Con | Blackest Night version Repaint of DC Classic Hal Jordan |
| Q3 2026 | Doomsday | Display stand and art card | McFarlane Toys Store | Death of Superman version Repaint of the Doomsday from the Death of Superman 2-pack |
| Q3 2026 | Bane | 2 alternate hands, display stand and card | McFarlane Toys Store | Batman: Knightfall version Solo rerelease of the Bane from the Knightfall 2-pack |
| Q3 2026 | Robin (Dick Grayson) | Grappling hook, 8 alternate hands, display stand and card | McFarlane Toys Store | Silver Age version |
| Q3 2026 | Catwoman | Whip, alternate head, 2 alternate hands, display stand and Jim Lee art card | McFarlane Toys Store | Batman: Hush version |

==== Accent Edition ====
| Release | Quantity | Figure | Accessories | Exclusivity | Description |
|---|---|---|---|---|---|
| Q2 2023 | 3000 | The Flash (Barry Allen) | 6 lightning effect pieces, display stand, card stand and Jim Lee art card | Big Bad Toy Store | Redeco of DC Rebirth version |
| Q2 2023 | 3000 | Superman | Display stand, card stand and Doug Mahnke, Jaime Mendoza, and Wil Quintana art card | Big Bad Toy Store | Redeco of Page Punchers version |
| Q3 2023 | 3010 | Martian Manhunter | Display stand, card stand and Jim Lee and Scott Williams art card | Big Bad Toy Store | Redeco of DC Rebirth version |
| Q4 2023 | 3010 | The Joker | Cane, display stand, card stand and Jason Fabok art card | Big Bad Toy Store | Redeco of Three Jokers version |
| Q4 2023 | 3010 | Aquaman | Trident, display stand, card stand and art card | Big Bad Toy Store | Redeco of Endless Winter version |
| Q1 2024 | 7400 | Red Hood (Jason Todd) | 0 pistols, display stand, card stand and art card | Big Bad Toy Store | Redeco of New 52 version |

==== Anniversary Edition ====
| Release | Figure | Accessories | Exclusivity | Description |
|---|---|---|---|---|
| Q3 2023 | Superman (85th Anniversary) | Display stand, flight stand, backdrop and Jim Lee art card | SDCC | Retool and redeco of the Infected Superman with a new head |
| Q3 2023 | Batman (30th Anniversary) | 2 alternate hands, batarang, display stand, card stand and numbered Kelley Jones art card | SDCC | Redeco of the Batman: Knightfall version |

==== Blacklight Edition ====
| Release | Quantity | Figure | Accessories | Exclusivity | Description |
|---|---|---|---|---|---|
| Q3 2023 | 3000 | Scarecrow | Display stand and numbered art card | Entertainment Earth | Infinite Frontier version |
| Q3 2023 | 3000 | The Joker | Knife, display stand, and numbered art card | Entertainment Earth | Infinite Frontier version |
| Q4 2023 | 3010 | Batman of Zur-En-Arh | Display stand, bat, knife, and numbered Tony Daniel art card | Entertainment Earth | Batman RIP version |
| Q4 2023 | 7350 | Mr. Freeze | Display stand, freeze gun, nameplate, and numbered Curt Swan art card | Entertainment Earth | The ice crimes of Mr. Zero version |

==== Box Sets & Vehicles ====
| Release | Set | Figure | Accessories | Exclusivity | Description |
|---|---|---|---|---|---|
| Q4 2021 | Year Two | Batman | Alternate cloth cape, alternate hands, batarang, graveyard display stand, and photo card | Target | Batman: Year Two version |
| Q4 2021 | Year Two | Batman | Alternate cloth cape, alternate hands, batarang, graveyard display stand, and photo card signed by Todd McFarlane | Target | Batman: Year Two version |
| Q4 2021 | Bane (Batman: Last Knight on Earth) | Batman | Joker's preserved head, baton, display stand and foil photo card | GameStop | Batman: Last Knight on Earth version |
| Q4 2021 | Bane (Batman: Last Knight on Earth) | Omega | Alternate hands, display stand and foil photo card | GameStop | Batman: Last Knight on Earth version |
| Q4 2021 | Bane (Batman: Last Knight on Earth) | Scarecrow | Flight stand and foil photo card | GameStop | Batman: Last Knight on Earth version |
| Q4 2021 | Bane (Batman: Last Knight on Earth) | Wonder Woman | Sword, display stand and foil photo card | GameStop | Batman: Last Knight on Earth version |
| Q4 2021 | Bane (Batman: Last Knight on Earth) | Bane | display stand, and foil photo card | GameStop | Batman: Last Knight on Earth version |
| Q4 2021 | King Shark (The Suicide Squad) | Peacemaker | Sword, display stand and foil photo card | Walmart | The Suicide Squad version |
| Q4 2021 | King Shark (The Suicide Squad) | Bloodsport | Twin katanas, display stand and foil photo card | Walmart | The Suicide Squad version |
| Q4 2021 | King Shark (The Suicide Squad) | Harley Quinn | Javelin's javelin, display stand and foil photo card | Walmart | The Suicide Squad version |
| Q4 2021 | King Shark (The Suicide Squad) | Polka-Dot Man | Goggles, polka-dot energy effect piece, display stand and foil photo card | Walmart | The Suicide Squad version |
| Q4 2021 | King Shark (The Suicide Squad) | King Shark | Display stand and foil photo card | Walmart | The Suicide Squad version |
| Q4 2021 | The Batman Who Laughs & Robins of Earth-22 | Batman Earth-22 | Display stand, combined display stand, and photo card | Walmart | |
| Q4 2021 | The Batman Who Laughs & Robins of Earth-22 | Robin Earth-22 (Laughing) | 3 display stands, 3 chains, and 1 photo card | Walmart | Laugh face |
| Q4 2021 | The Batman Who Laughs & Robins of Earth-22 | Robin Earth-22 (Screaming) | 3 display stands, 3 chains, and 1 photo card | Walmart | Scream face |
| Q4 2021 | The Batman Who Laughs & Robins of Earth-22 | Robin Earth-22 (Smirking) | 3 display stands, 3 chains, and 1 photo card | Walmart | Smirk face |
| Q2 2022 | Joker Bot (The New 52: Futures End) | Batman (Terry McGinnis) | 2 Batarangs, 2 alternate hands, display stand, and foil photo card | Target | Batman Beyond version |
| Q2 2022 | Joker Bot (The New 52: Futures End) | Batwoman (Elainna Grayson) | 2 Batarangs, 2 alternate hands, display stand and foil photo card | Target | Batman Beyond version |
| Q2 2022 | Joker Bot (The New 52: Futures End) | Shriek | Sonic blast effect piece, display stand and foil photo card | Target | Batman Beyond version |
| Q2 2022 | Joker Bot (The New 52: Futures End) | Blight | Alternate hand, display stand, foil photo card | Target | Batman Beyond version |
| Q2 2022 | Joker Bot (The New 52: Futures End) | Joker Bot | Display stand, and foil photo card | Target | Batman Beyond version |
| Q3 2022 | Bat Family | Batman | Grapple launcher, batarang, display stand, and Jason Fabok art card | Amazon | Redeco of Three Jokers version |
| Q3 2022 | Bat Family | Batgirl (Barbara Gordon) | Grapple launcher, display stand, and art card | Amazon | Redeco of DC Rebirth version |
| Q3 2022 | Bat Family | Red Hood | Alt head, crowbar, display stand, and Jason Fabok art card | Amazon | Redeco of New 52 version with alternate head |
| Q3 2022 | Bat Family | Robin (Damian Wayne) | Sword, 2 throwing glaives, display stand, and Patrick Gleason art card | Amazon | DC Rebirth version with alternate head |
| Q3 2022 | Bat Family | Nightwing | Grapple launcher, batarang, display stand, and art card | Amazon | Redeco of DC Rebirth version with alternate head |
| Q4 2022 | Batman: The Animated Series (30th Anniversary) | Batman (30th Anniversary) | Grappling pistol, batarang alternate hands, light up display stand and Bruce Timm art card | Target | Batman: The Animated Series version Multi-branded as DC Direct and DC Multiverse |
| Q4 2022 | Batman: The Animated Series (30th Anniversary) | Batman (30th Anniversary) | Grappling pistol, batarang alternate hands, light up display stand and signed Bruce Timm art card | Target | Batman: The Animated Series version Multi-branded as DC Direct and DC Multiverse |
| Q4 2022 | Batmobeast (with Batman) | Batmobeast | Photo card | Walmart | Dark Nights: Death Metal version |
| Q4 2022 | Batmobeast (with Batman) | Batman | Photo card | Walmart | Dark Nights: Death Metal version |
| Q2 2023 | Batwing | | Wall mount and art card | McFarlane Toys Store | The Flash version |
| Q3 2023 | Superman vs. Doomsday | Superman | Alternate hands, display stand and Dan Jurgens and Brett Breeding art card | Target | Death of Superman version Retool and redeco of the Infected Superman with a new head |
| Q3 2023 | Superman vs. Doomsday | Doomsday | Display stand and Kenneth Rocafort art card | Target | Reign of Doomsday version |
| Q4 2023 | Batmobile with Batman | Batmobile | 2 batmobile wingtips | Amazon | Batman version Reissue of The Flash version |
| Q4 2023 | Batmobile with Batman | Batman | Display stand | Amazon | Batman version |
| Q4 2023 | Clayface, Batman and Batwoman | Batman | Batarang, grapnel launcher, display stand, and art card | Amazon | DC Rebirth version Redeco of the previous New 52 Batman |
| Q4 2023 | Clayface, Batman and Batwoman | Batwoman | Batarang, grapnel launcher, display stand, and art card | Amazon | DC Rebirth version |
| Q4 2023 | Clayface, Batman and Batwoman | Clayface | Display stand, and art card | Amazon | DC Rebirth version Redeco of the Mega Figure |
| Q4 2023 | Injustice 2 | Doctor Fate | Display stand, Injustice art print, and art card | Amazon | Injustice 2 version Retool of the previous Page Punchers version |
| Q4 2023 | Injustice 2 | Supergirl | 2 alternate hands, display stand, and art card | Amazon | Injustice 2 version Retool of the previous Page Punchers version |
| Q4 2023 | Injustice 2 | Batman | 2 batarangs, display stand, and Marco Santucci art card | Amazon | Injustice 2 version Retool of the previous Page Punchers version |
| Q4 2023 | Atomic Skull vs Superman | Atomic Skull | 2 alternate hands, display stand, flame effect stand, and Doug Mahnke art card | Amazon | DC Rebirth version Retool and Redeco of the New 52 Lex Luthor figure with a new head |
| Q4 2023 | Atomic Skull vs Superman | Superman | 2 alternate hands, display stand, and Jim Lee art card | Amazon | Redeco of Action Comics #1000 version |
| Q4 2023 | Bat-Raptor | Bat-Raptor | | GameStop | Redeco of Dark Nights: Metal version |
| Q4 2023 | Bat-Raptor | Batman | | GameStop | Redeco of Batman: Hush version |
| Q4 2023 | The Joker Interrogation Room | The Joker | 6 alternate hands, 2 chairs, table, hand cuffs, cell phone, display stand, environment backdrop, photo card | McFarlane Toys Store | The Dark Knight version |
| Q4 2023 | Lobo & Spacehog | Lobo | Chained hook, alternate head, guitar, Dawg, and display stand | Amazon | Redeco of DC Rebirth version |
| Q4 2023 | Lobo & Spacehog | Spacehog | | Amazon | Justice League of America version |
| Q1 2024 | Catwoman and Bat-Pod | Bat-Pod | | McFarlane Toys Store | The Dark Knight Rises version |
| Q1 2024 | Catwoman and Bat-Pod | Catwoman | Alternate hands, display stand and Anne Hathaway photo card | McFarlane Toys Store | The Dark Knight Rises version |
| Q2 2024 | Kilowog and Green Lantern | Green Lantern (Kyle Rayner) | Armor construct, 2 sword constructs, lantern, alternate hand, display stand and Darryl Banks & Romeo Tanghal art card | Amazon | Classic version Redeco of Changing the Guard version |
| Q2 2024 | Kilowog and Green Lantern | Kilowog | Lantern, hammer construct, display stand, and Mike McKone art card | Amazon | Green Lantern Corps version |
| Q2 2024 | Shazam and Freddy Freeman | Shazam | 6 alternate hands, Wizard's staff, Mister Mind, 2 art cards and Rock of Eternity display base | Amazon | Shazam! Fury of the Gods battle-damaged version Redeco of the previous Fury of the Gods Shazam |
| Q2 2024 | Shazam and Freddy Freeman | Freddy Freeman | 6 alternate hands, Wizard's staff, Mister Mind, 2 art cards and Rock of Eternity display base | Amazon | Shazam! Fury of the Gods version |
| Q3 2024 | Batmobile | | | McFarlane Toys Store | Batman: White Knight version |
| Q3 2024 | Tumbler and Lucius Fox | Tumbler | | McFarlane Toys Store | Batman Begins version |
| Q3 2024 | Tumbler and Lucius Fox | Lucius Fox | Equipment case, display stand and photo card | McFarlane Toys Store | Batman Begins version |
| Q3 2024 | Bane's Tumbler | | Photo card | Amazon | The Dark Knight Rises version Camouflage redeco and retool of the Batman Begins Tumbler |
| Q3 2024 | Rookie Batman & Mr. Bloom | Batman (James Gordon) | Alternate unmasked head, combined display stand, display stand, and Greg Capullo and FCO Plascencia art card | Target | Batman: Endgame version |
| Q3 2024 | Rookie Batman & Mr. Bloom | Mr. Bloom | Display stand, and Greg Capullo art card | Target | Batman: Endgame version |
| Q3 2024 | The Joker & Punchline - Signed | The Joker | Knife, display stand and Andy Kubert and Edgar Delgado art card | Target | Retool of the Infinite Frontier Joker with a new head |
| Q3 2024 | The Joker & Punchline - Signed | Punchline | Knife, display stand and art card signed by Jorge Jimenez | Target | Infinite Frontier version |
| Q4 2024 | Nightwing vs. Court of Owls | Nightwing | Eskrima sticks, display stand and Eddy Barrows art card | Amazon | New 52 version |
| Q4 2024 | Nightwing vs. Court of Owls | Owl | Pet owl, display stand and Robson Rocha and Guillermo Ortego art card | Amazon | Batman Eternal version |
| Q4 2024 | Nightwing vs. Court of Owls | Talon | 2 swords, 2 knives, scabbard, display stand and Eddy Barrows art card | Amazon | New 52 version Redeco of the previous Talon |
| Q4 2024 | Batmobile | | | Amazon | Batman Forever version Glow-in-the-dark redeco of the standard release Forever Batmobile |
| Q4 2024 | Batman and Solomon Grundy | Batman | Grappling pistol, display stand and CGI render card | Amazon | Batman: Arkham City version Redeco of the previous Arkham City Batman |
| Q4 2024 | Batman and Solomon Grundy | Solomon Grundy | CGI render card | Amazon | Batman: Arkham City version Translucent recast of the Solomon Grundy BAF with a new skeleton pattern |
| Q4 2024 | Batman | | Bat-Glider, batarang, grappling pistol, flight stand, Gotham City backdrop and Greg Capullo art card | Amazon | The Thirteenth Hour version |
| Q4 2024 | Darkseid | | Throne, spear and CGI render card | Amazon | Zack Snyder's Justice League version Reissue of the previous ZSJL Darkseid with a new throne accessory |
| Q4 2024 | Batmobile and Batman Beyond | Batmobile | Flight stand, lights and sounds, and card | Amazon | Batman Beyond version Gold Label version of the standard release Beyond Batmobile with a bonus Batman figure |
| Q4 2024 | Batmobile and Batman Beyond | Batman (Terry McGinnis) | 2 alternate hands | Amazon | Batman Beyond version Red redeco of the Neo-Gothic Batman figure |
| Q4 2024 | Batman | | Batarang, gas mask, 4 alternate hands, Scarface head, alternate flowing cape, gargoyle display base and Norm Breyfogle art card | McFarlane Toys Store | Detective Comics #587 version |
| Q1 2025 | Batman | | Grappling hook, 4 alternate hands, lamppost, display base and Frank Miller cover backdrop | Amazon | The Dark Knight Returns cover recreation version Black repaint of the previous TDKR Batman |
| Q2 2025 | The Joker | | Camera, display base and Brian Bolland cover backdrop | Amazon | Batman: The Killing Joke cover recreation version Redeco of the Comedian Joker |
| Q3 2025 | Superman | | Smoke effect pieces, display base and Alex Ross cover backdrop | McFarlane Toys Store | Kingdom Come cover recreation version Red redeco of the Kingdom Come Superman |
| Q3 2025 | Batmobile | | | McFarlane Toys Store | The Batman version |
| Q4 2025 | Green Lantern (Hal Jordan) | | Power battery, 2 flame effect pieces, 2 alternate hands, display base, Darryl Banks cover backdrop and art card | Walmart | Emerald Twilight version |
| Q3 2026 | Superman Red/Superman Blue | Superman Blue | 8 electrical effect pieces, display stand and art card | McFarlane Toys Store | Repackaged version of the single release |
| Q3 2026 | Superman Red/Superman Blue | Superman Red | 8 electrical effect pieces, display stand and art card | McFarlane Toys Store | Repackaged version of the single release |

==== Build-A ====
| Release | Set | Figure | Accessories | Exclusivity | Description | Build-A Piece |
|---|---|---|---|---|---|---|
| Q4 2022 | Solomon Grundy | Batman | Grapple launcher, display stand, and CGI card | Walmart | Batman: Arkham City version Black and White variant | Legs |
| Q4 2022 | Solomon Grundy | The Penguin | Umbrella, display stand, and CGI card | Walmart | Batman: Arkham City version Black and White variant | Head and Jacket |
| Q4 2022 | Solomon Grundy | Catwoman | Whip, display stand, and CGI card | Walmart | Batman: Arkham City version Black and White variant | Chest |
| Q4 2022 | Solomon Grundy | Ra's al Ghul | Sword, display stand, and toy photo card | Walmart | Batman: Arkham City version Black and White variant | Arms |
| Q1 2023 | Cyborg (Flashpoint) | Aquaman | Trident, display stand and Ardian Syaf and Vicente Cifuentes art card | Target | Flashpoint version Redeco of Endless Winter version with alternate head | Torso |
| Q2 2023 | Cyborg (Flashpoint) | Project Superman | Display stand and Andy Kubert, Sandra Hope, and Alex Sinclair art card | Target | Flashpoint version Redeco of Superman (Jon Kent) Future State version with alternate head and emblems | Arms |
| Q3 2023 | Cyborg (Flashpoint) | The Flash (Barry Allen) | Alternate unmasked head, display stand and Jim Lee art card | Target | Flashpoint version | Legs |
| Q4 2023 | Cyborg (Flashpoint) | Wonder Woman | Sword, display stand and Ed Benes and Pete Pantazis art card | Target | Flashpoint version | Head |
| Q3 2023 | Bane (Jokerized) (The Dark Knight) | The Joker | Money pile, Bane head and hands, display stand and Heath Ledger photo card | Target | Redeco of The Dark Knight version | Head and Hands |
| Q3 2023 | Bane (Jokerized) (The Dark Knight) | Batman | Grappling gun, 3 batarangs, Bane legs, display stand and Christian Bale photo card | Target | Redeco of The Dark Knight version | Legs |
| Q4 2023 | Bane (Jokerized) (The Dark Knight) | Two-Face | Display stand and Aaron Eckhart photo card | Target | Redeco of The Dark Knight version | Torso |
| Q4 2023 | Bane (Jokerized) (The Dark Knight) | Scarecrow | 2 alternate hands, display stand and toy photo card | Target | Redeco of The Dark Knight version | Arms |
| Q1 2024 | Monitor (Crisis on Infinite Earths) | Kid Flash (Wally West) | Alternate hands, display stand and Carmine di Giandomenico art card | McFarlane Toys Store | Crisis On Infinite Earths version | Legs |
| Q1 2024 | Monitor (Crisis on Infinite Earths) | Psycho-Pirate | Display stand and George Perez art card | McFarlane Toys Store | Crisis On Infinite Earths version | Torso |
| Q1 2024 | Monitor (Crisis on Infinite Earths) | The Spectre | Display stand and George Perez art card | McFarlane Toys Store | Crisis On Infinite Earths version | Head and cape |
| Q1 2024 | Monitor (Crisis on Infinite Earths) | Earth-2 Superman | Alternate hands, display stand and George Perez art card | McFarlane Toys Store | Crisis On Infinite Earths version | Arms |

==== Frostbite Edition ====
| Release | Quantity | Figure | Accessories | Exclusivity | Description |
|---|---|---|---|---|---|
| Q1 2024 | 7600 | Batman | Batarang, grapple gun, display stand, card stand, and David Finch and Brad Anderson art card | GameStop | Translucent version of DC Rebirth version |
| Q2 2024 | 7250 | The Joker (The Comedian) | Crowbar, Camera, display stand, card stand, and Jason Fabok art card | GameStop | Translucent version of Three Jokers |
| Q3 2024 | 5000 | Deathstroke | Sword, knife, figure display stand, card stand, and Tony S. Daniel, Sandu Florea, and Tomeu Morey art card | GameStop | Translucent version of DC Rebirth version |
| Q4 2024 | 4200 | Nightwing | Two Escrima sticks, two alternate hands, and photo card | GameStop | Translucent version |
| Q2 2025 | | Batman | Two ice freeze effects, display stand, card stand, and George Clooney CGI photo card | GameStop | Translucent version of Batman and Robin |
| Q2 2025 | 4250 | Red Hood | Frostbite crowbar, two ice effects, frostbite display stand, frostbite card stand, and authenticated Jason Fabok art card | GameStop | Translucent version of Three Jokers |

==== Glow in the Dark Edition ====
| Release | Quantity | Figure | Accessories | Exclusivity | Description |
|---|---|---|---|---|---|
| Q3 2023 | 3000 | Green Lantern (John Stewart) | 2 energy swords, display stand, card display stand and numbered Jim Lee art card | Amazon | Redeco of DC Rebirth version |
| Q4 2023 | 3000 | Swamp Thing | Alternate hand, alternate head, display stand, card display stand and numbered Greg Capullo art card | Amazon | DC Rebirth version |
| Q4 2023 | 3000 | The Batman Who Laughs as Batman | Batarang, display stand, card display stand and art card | Amazon | Redeco of Dark Nights: Metal version |
| Q4 2023 | 3000 | The Joker Titan | Batarang, display stand, card display stand and art card | Amazon | Redeco of Batman: Arkham version |
| Q1 2024 | 5100 | Parallax (Hal Jordan) | numbered Doug Mahnke and Christian Alamy art card | Amazon | |

==== Jokerized Edition ====
| Release | Figure | Accessories | Exclusivity | Description |
|---|---|---|---|---|
| Q2 2023 | Batman Dark Detective | 4 Jokerized playing cards (10d, Qc, Kh, As), card stand, display stand, and Gabriele Dell'Otto art card | Target | Deluxe Redeco of Future State version |
| Q2 2023 | Batman | 4 Jokerized playing cards (2h, 4d, 4c, Js), 2 alternate hands, grappling hook, card stand, display stand, and art card | Target | Deluxe Redeco of The Dark Knight Returns version |
| Q3 2023 | The Joker | Money pile, Bane head and hands, display stand and Heath Ledger photo card | Target | Redeco of The Dark Knight version |
| Q3 2023 | Batman | Grappling gun, 3 batarangs, Bane legs, display stand and Christian Bale photo card | Target | Redeco of The Dark Knight version |
| Q3 2023 | Red Robin (Tim Drake) | 4 Jokerized playing cards (3d, Ac, 8c, 9h), staff, display stand and Brett Booth, Norm Rapmund, and Andrew Dalhouse art card | Target | The New 52 Jokerized version |
| Q4 2023 | Two-Face | Display stand and Aaron Eckhart photo card | Target | Redeco of The Dark Knight version |
| Q4 2023 | Scarecrow | 2 alternate hands, display stand and toy photo card | Target | Redeco of The Dark Knight version |
| Q4 2023 | Batman | 4 Jokerized playing cards, grappling pistol, rope line, wound up cable, display stand and art card | Target | Batman: Curse of the White Knight Jokerized version |
| Q4 2023 | Batgirl | 4 Jokerized playing cards (6c, 3s, 10h, Qd), batarang, grappling gun, display stand, card stand, and Mikel Janin art card | Target | Three Jokers Jokerized version |

==== Mega Figures ====
| Release | Figure | Accessories | Exclusivity | Description |
|---|---|---|---|---|
| Q3 2021 | Darkseid | Spear, chest armor, display stand, and CGI render card | Target | Zack Snyder's Justice League version Mega Figure |
| Q3 2021 | King Shark | 2 severed arms, display stand, card display base, and photo card | Walmart | The Suicide Squad mega figure |
| Q3 2021 | King Shark | 2 severed arms, display stand, card display base, and photo card | Walmart | The Suicide Squad mega figure Bloodied variant - Non-US |

==== Mega Figures (12" Statue) ====
| Release | Figure | Accessories | Exclusivity | Description |
|---|---|---|---|---|
| Q2 2022 | Batman 12" | Backdrop, display stand with gargoyle, and photo card | Walmart | The Batman version Red and Black variant |
| Q2 2023 | Batman 12" Unmasked | Display stand and art card | McFarlane Toys Store | The Flash version |
| Q2 2023 | Dark Flash 12" | Display stand and art card | McFarlane Toys Store | The Flash version |

==== Knightmare Edition ====
| Release | Quantity | Figure | Accessories | Exclusivity | Description |
|---|---|---|---|---|---|
| Q1 2024 | 8100 | Batman | Card display stand, display stand and Patrick Gleason art card | McFarlane Toys Store | Hellbat armor version |
| Q2 2024 | 8100 | The Batman Who Laughs as Batman | Batarang, display stand, card stand, and art card | McFarlane Toys Store | Dark Nights: Metal version |
| Q4 2024 | 5250 | Batman | Display stand, card stand, and art card | McFarlane Toys Store | |
| Q2 2025 | 5700 | Azrael | Display stand, card stand, and art card | McFarlane Toys Store | |

==== Patina Edition ====
| Release | Quantity | Figure | Accessories | Exclusivity | Description |
|---|---|---|---|---|---|
| Q2 2023 | 10000 | Superman Unchained (Patina) | Display stand, card stand and art card | McFarlane Toys Store | Redeco of the Superman Unchained version |
| Q3 2023 | 4010 | Superboy Prime (Patina) | Display stand, card stand and art card | McFarlane Toys Store | Redeco of the Dark Nights: Death Metal version |
| Q4 2023 | 5700 | Merciless (Patina) | Display stand, card stand and art card | McFarlane Toys Store | Redeco version |
| Q1 2024 | 6400 | Armored Batman (Patina) | Display stand, card stand and art card | McFarlane Toys Store | Redeco of the Kingdom Come version |

==== Sketch Edition ====
| Release | Quantity | Figure | Accessories | Exclusivity | Description |
|---|---|---|---|---|---|
| Q3 2023 | 3000 | The Batman Who Laughs | Knife, sickle, display stand, card stand and numbered Greg Capullo art card | Entertainment Earth | Dark Nights: Death Metal version |
| Q3 2023 | 3000 | Superman (85th Anniversary) | 2 alternate hands, display stand, card stand, and numbered Patrick Zircher art card | Entertainment Earth | Redeco of DC Rebirth version |
| Q4 2023 | 5000 | Batman | Grappling hook and line, display stand, card stand, and Sean Gordon Murphy art card | Entertainment Earth | Redeco of Batman: White Knight version |
| Q4 2023 | 6800 | Batman | Night-vision goggles, 4 knives, grapple gun, display stand, card stand and Todd McFarlane art card | Entertainment Earth | Redeco of Original design by Todd McFarlane |
| Q4 2023 | 510 | Batman - Signed | Night-vision goggles, 4 knives, grapple gun, display stand, card stand and Todd McFarlane art card signed by Todd McFarlane | Entertainment Earth | Redeco of Original design by Todd McFarlane |
| Q4 2023 | 7400 | The Joker (The Comedian) | Crowbar, Camera, display stand, card stand and Jason Fabok art card | Entertainment Earth | Redeco of Three Jokers |
| Q4 2023 | 510 | The Joker - Signed (The Comedian) | Crowbar, Camera, display stand, card stand and Jason Fabok art card signed by Jason Fabok | Entertainment Earth | Redeco of Three Jokers |
| Q4 2023 | 5100 | Batman (Hazmat Suit) | Display stand and toy photo card | McFarlane Toys Store | Redeco of Justice League Rebirth |
| Q2 2024 | 3100 | Azrael | Flame effect, sword, display stand, card stand and Sean Gordon Murphy art card | Entertainment Earth | Redeco of Batman: Curse of the White Knight version |
| Q3 2024 | 4800 | Batman | 2 Batarangs, 2 alternate hands, display stand, card stand, and Jim Lee art card | Entertainment Earth | Redeco of Batman: Hush version |

=== Chase - Platinum Editions ===
==== Artist Proof ====
| Release | Figure | Accessories | Description |
|---|---|---|---|
| Q4 2021 | Lobo | Chained hook, display stand, and artist proof card | DC Rebirth version |
| Q4 2021 | Red Hood (Jason Todd) | Alternate 'finger guns' hands, display stand, and artist proof card | Gotham Knights version |
| Q4 2021 | Superman | Display stand and artist proof card | DC Rebirth version Redeco of Bizzaro DC Rebirth with alternate head and chest plate |
| Q4 2021 | Swamp Thing | Alternate hand, display stand, and artist proof card | DC Rebirth version |
| Q4 2021 | Batgirl | Night stick, display stand and artist proof card | Gotham Knights version |
| Q1 2022 | Batman | 2 alternate hands, grappling hook, display stand and artist proof card | The Dark Knight Returns version |
| Q1 2022 | Robin (Carrie Kelley) | Sling shot, display stand and artist proof card | The Dark Knight Returns version |
| Q1 2022 | General Zod | 4 Alternate hands, display stand, and artist proof card | DC Rebirth version |
| Q1 2022 | Ghost-Maker | Two swords, display stand, and artist proof card | Future State version |
| Q1 2022 | Green Arrow | Bow, arrows, quiver, display stand, and artist proof card | Injustice 2 version |
| Q2 2022 | Robin (Damian Wayne) | Sword, display stand, and artist proof card | Infinite Frontier version |
| Q2 2022 | Hush | Two knives, display stand, and artist proof card | Batman: Hush version |
| Q2 2022 | Flash (Barry Allen) | 3 lightning effects, display stand, and artist proof card | The Flash version |

==== Variants ====
| Release | Figure | Accessories | Description |
|---|---|---|---|
| Q1 2020 | Batman | Grappling pistol, batarang alternate hands, display stand and Bruce Timm art card | Batman: The Animated Series version Blue variant (Chase - Platinum Edition) |
| Q1 2020 | Batman | Batarang, grappling pistol, display stand and Jim Lee art card | Detective Comics #1000 version Blue variant (Chase - Platinum Edition) |
| Q2 2020 | Joker | Pistol, 2 wind-up chattering teeth, display stand and CGI art card | Batman: Arkham Asylum version Bronze variant (Chase - Platinum Edition) |
| Q2 2020 | Batman | Grappling gun, batarang, folded batarang, grenade, display stand and CGI art card | Batman: Arkham Asylum version Bronze variant (Chase - Platinum Edition) |
| Fall 2020 | Batman | Batarang, grappling gun, explosive gel gun, display stand and CGI art card | Batman: Arkham Knight version Gold variant (Chase - Platinum Edition) |
| Fall 2020 | Deathstroke | Katana, display stand and CGI art card | Batman: Arkham Origins version Gold variant (Chase - Platinum Edition) |
| Q1 2021 | Gorilla Grodd | Photo card and stand | Injustice 2 version Platinum variant (Chase - Platinum Edition) |
| Q3 2021 | Batman | Batarang, display stand and Ben Affleck photo card | Zack Snyder's Justice League tactical suit version Goggles up variant (Chase - Platinum Edition) |
| Q3 2021 | Doctor Fate | Flight stand and photo card | Injustice 2 version Blue variant (Chase - Platinum Edition) |
| Q3 2021 | Batman (Terry McGinnis) | Batarang, alternate hands, 2 jet exhaust pieces, flight stand and photo card | Batman Beyond version Digitized Damage variant (Chase - Platinum Edition) |
| Q2 2022 | Batman 12" | Display stand, and photo card | The Batman version Gold variant (Chase - Platinum Edition) |
| Q1 2023 | Mr. Freeze | Freeze ray, display stand, and Jason Fabok art card | Victor Fries version Super Powers Collection variant (Chase - Platinum Edition) |
| Q1 2023 | Flash (Jay Garrick) | 2 alternate hands, 4 speed force effects, display stand and art card | DC Classic version The Flash colors variant (Chase - Platinum Edition) |
| Q2 2023 | Catwoman | 2 alternate hands, Whip, display stand, and Jim Balent art card | Batman: The Animated Series colors version Gray variant (Chase - Platinum Edition) |
| Q3 2023 | The Riddler | Staff, 6 alternate hands, display stand, and Gil Kane and Murphy Anderson art card | DC Classic version Single "?" on chest variant (Chase - Platinum Edition) |
| Q4 2023 | Superman | Alternate hands, display stand and Jheremy Raapack art card | Dark Redeco Injustice 2 version (Chase - Platinum Edition) |
| Q4 2023 | Batman (James Gordon) | Alternate unmasked head, 6 alternate hands, grapple gun, display stand and Greg Capullo and Danny Miki art card | Batman: Endgame version Blue variant (Chase - Platinum Edition) |
| Q4 2023 | Brainiac | 4 tendrils, display stand and CGI art card | Injustice 2 version Blue variant (Chase - Platinum Edition) |
| Q4 2023 | Supergirl | Flight stand, display stand and Emanuela Lupacchino and Michael Atiyeh art card | DC Rebirth version CW Colors variant (Chase - Platinum Edition); First Gold Label Platinum |
| Q1 2024 | Steel | Hammer, display stand, and Jon Bogdanove art card | Reign of the Supermen version |
| Q1 2024 | Batman (Sky Dive) | Wired cape, display stand and art card | The Dark Knight version |
| Q1 2024 | Catwoman | 4 alternate hands, necklace, broken batman mask, display stand and art card | The Dark Knight Rises version |
| Q1 2024 | Spectre (Hal Jordan) | Display stand, 2 BAF pieces, and George Perez art card | Day of Judgement version Redeco of the Crisis on Infinite Earths Spectre |
| Q2 2024 | Superman Red | 4 electricity effect pieces, BAF piece, display stand and Howard Porter art card | Redeco of Superman Blue |
| Q2 2024 | Aquaman | BAF pieces, display stand and Howard Porter art card | Batman Total Justice version Redeco of JLA version |
| Q2 2024 | Green Lantern (John Stewart) | 2 green flame effect pieces, BAF pieces, display stand and Neal Adams art card | Green Lantern: Mosaic version Redeco of classic John Stewart |
| Q3 2024 | Batman (DCEU) | Alternate hands, display stand and art card | The Flash blue and gray costume version More accurate redeco of the initial Flash DCEU Batman |
| Q3 2024 | Bullseye Batman | Batarang, alternate hands and Sheldon Moldoff art card | The Rainbow Batman version White redeco of Knightfall Batman |
| Q3 2024 | Batman | Batarang, Bat-Radio, 4 alternate hands, display stand and Adam West photo card | Batman version Black and white redeco of the Adam West Batman |
| Q3 2024 | Batman (Dick Grayson) | 4 alternate hands, display stand and Frank Quitely and Alex Sinclair art card | Batman and Robin blue costume version |
| Q4 2024 | Joker | Alternate hands, Laughing Fish, cane, display stand and José Luis García-López art card | Black tuxedo version Black redeco of the Silver Age Joker |
| Q4 2024 | "False God" Superman | 4 alternate hands, display stand and photo card | Batman v Superman: Dawn of Justice statue version Silvery redeco of the BVS Superman |
| Q4 2024 | Armored Batman | Kryptonite spear, 2 alternate hands, display stand and Ben Affleck photo card | Batman v Superman: Dawn of Justice Kryptonite glow version Green repaint of BVS Armored Batman |
| Q4 2024 | Batman | Batarang, 2 alternate hands, BAF pieces, display stand and Todd McFarlane art card | Spawn/Batman version Solo release of the figure from the two-pack |
| Q4 2024 | Superman | 2 attack effect pieces, BAF pieces, display stand and art card | Justice League Task Force Player 2 version Orange redeco of the Task Force Superman |
| Q4 2024 | Flash (Wally West) | 2 attack effect pieces, BAF piece, display stand and art card | Justice League Task Force Player 2 version Purple redeco of the Task Force Flash |
| Q4 2024 | Aquaman | Trident, 2 attack effect pieces, BAF pieces, display stand and art card | Justice League Task Force Player 2 version Blue redeco of the Task Force Aquaman |
| Q4 2024 | Batman | 2 attack effect pieces, BAF pieces, display stand and art card | Justice League Task Force Player 2 version Red redeco of the Task Force Batman |
| Q3 2025 | Orange Batman | Batarang, 4 alternate hands and Sheldon Moldoff art card | The Rainbow Batman version Orange redeco of Knightfall Batman |

==== Red Platinum - unique characters ====
| Release | Figure | Accessories | Description |
|---|---|---|---|
| Q3 2024 | Reverse-Flash (Daniel West) | Display stand and Francis Manapul and Brian Buccellato art card | New 52 version |
| Q3 2024 | Manhunters | Alternate battle-damaged faceplate, 2 jet exhaust effect pieces, display stand and art card | Green Lantern Corps version |
| Q3 2024 | Sportsmaster | Hockey stick, baseball bat, display stand and art card | Young Justice version |
| Q3 2024 | Cyborg Superman (Zor-El) | Flight stand and Aaron Kuder art card | New 52 version |
| Q3 2024 | Lucius Fox | 2 alternate hands, display stand and movie poster card | Batman Begins version Repaint of the Lucius Fox from the Tumbler box set |
| Q3 2024 | Hugo Strange | Alternate hands, mask, display stand and Brian Bolland art card | Batman: Prey version Retool of Year Two Batman with a new head and accessories |
| Q4 2024 | The Question | Display stand and Tommy Lee Edwards art card | DC Classic version |
| Q4 2024 | Shining Knight (Sir Ystin) | Sword, display stand and Tony Daniel art card | Seven Soldiers version |
| Q4 2024 | Effigy | 2 flame effect pieces, display stand and art card | DC Classic version |
| Q1 2025 | Nightmaster | Sword, display stand and Bernie Wrightson art card | Shadowpact version |
| Q1 2025 | Scarecrow | Display stand, 2 alternate hands and art card | Batman Begins business suit version |
| Q4 2025 | Dark Flash | 2 alternate heads, display stand and Eddy Barrows art card | Dark Nights: Speed Metal version Repaint of the previous Dark Flash toy with all headsculpts included |
| Q4 2025 | Guardian | Shield, display stand and Jesus Merino art card | Action Comics version |
| Q4 2025 | Black Condor (Ryan Kendall) | Display stand and card | Primal Force version |
| Q4 2025 | Gangbuster | Display stand and card | The Adventures of Superman version |
| Q1 2026 | White Lantern Batman | Display stand and Ivan Reis art card | Brightest Day version White repaint and retool of JLA Batman with a new head |
| Q1 2026 | Injustice Gang Batman | Display stand and Howard Porter art card | JLA: Rock of Ages version Purple repaint and retool of Spawn/Batman Batman with a new head |
| Q1 2026 | Saturn Girl | 2 alternate hands, display stand and Jeffrey Moy art card | Legion of Super-Heroes version |
| Q1 2026 | Aztek | 2 alternate hands, display stand and art card | JLA version |
| Q2 2026 | Batman | Batarang, 4 alternate hands, display stand and Bob Kane, Jerry Robinson, and Strauss Engraving Company art card | Golden Age version Black repaint of the Silver Age Batman |
| Q2 2026 | Sentinel | Power Battery, flame effect piece, display stand and Paul Pelletier and Jonathan D. Smith art card | Zero Hour: Crisis in Time! version Repaint of the classic Alan Scott figure |
| Q2 2026 | Black Mask | 2 alternate hands, display stand and Phil Cho art card | DC Classic version |

=== McFarlane Collector Edition ===
==== Standard figures ====
| Wave | Release | # | Figure | Accessories | Description |
|---|---|---|---|---|---|
| Wave 1 | Q3 2023 | 1 | Golden Age Superman | Chains, display stand, card stand and Detective Comics staff and Joe Shuster art card | Action Comics #1 version Retool of DC Rebirth version |
| Wave 1 | Q3 2023 | 2 | Green Lantern (Alan Scott) | Lantern, fire construct, display stand, card stand and Alex Ross art card | Day of Vengeance version |
| Wave 1 | Q3 2023 | 3 | Abyss | Scythe, alternate hand, display stand, card stand and Jorge Molina art card | Batman: Abyss version |
| Wave 2 | Q4 2023 | 4 | Firestorm | 2 fire effects, 6 alternate hands, display stand, card stand, and Yıldıray Çınar art card | Crisis on Infinite Earths version |
| Wave 2 | Q4 2023 | 5 | Hawkman (Katar Hol) | Mace, wings, display stand, card stand and David Finch art card | Zero Hour: Crisis in Time! version |
| Wave 2 | Q4 2023 | 6 | Sinestro | Construct, lantern, display stand, card stand and Tyler Kirkham art card | Sinestro Corps War version |
| Wave 3 | Q1 2024 | 7 | Green Lantern Batman | Power Battery, 2 flame effect pieces, 4 alternate hands, display stand, art card and card stand | |
| Wave 3 | Q1 2024 | 8 | Captain Carrot | 4 alternate hands, display stand, Gary Frank art card and card stand | The Multiversity version |
| Wave 3 | Q1 2024 | 9 | Superman | Krypto, alternate hands, display stand, Dan Jurgens, Norm Rapmund, and Alex Sinclair art card and card stand | Return of Superman version Retool of the Dark Knight Returns Superman with a new long haired head |
| Wave 4 | Q1 2024 | 10 | Wonder Woman | Lasso of Truth, sword, shield, axe, 4 alternate hands, display stand, Terry Dodson art card and card stand | Who is Wonder Woman? version |
| Wave 5 | Q2 2024 | 11 | Starfire | 2 starbolt effect pieces, flight stand, card stand and Sam Basri art card | DC Rebirth version |
| Wave 5 | Q2 2024 | 12 | Penguin | Umbrella, 2 alternate hands, display stand, card stand and Mike Grell art card | DC Classic version |
| Wave 5 | Q2 2024 | 13 | Captain Boomerang | 2 boomerangs 4 alternate hands, display stand, card stand and Francis Manapul art card | DC Rebirth version |
| Wave 6 | Q3 2024 | 14 | Sgt. Rock | 4 alternate hands, knife, shovel, helmet, display stand, card stand, and Joe Kubert art card | |
| Wave 6 | Q3 2024 | 15 | Superboy | 2 alternate hands, 2 alternate heads, flight stand, environment stand, display stand and Stanley 'Artgerm' Lau art card | Teen Titans version |
| Wave 6 | Q3 2024 | 16 | Batman | 4 alternate hands, batarang, batcamera, grappling hook, GoGo magician wand, display stand and Jiro Kuwata art card | Bat-Manga version |
| San Diego Comic-Con exclusive | July 2024 | 17 | Agent Liberty | Shield, exhaust flame effect piece, display stand, card stand and art card | Panic in the Sky version |
| Wave 7 | Q4 2024 | 18 | Clock King | 2 clock hand blades, display stand, card stand and Dan Spiegle art card | Classic version |
| Wave 7 | Q4 2024 | 19 | Ragman | 2 magic effect pieces, display stand, card and Jesús Saíz art card | Shadowpact version |
| Wave 7 | Q4 2024 | 20 | Red Hood | Pickaxe, dagger, display stand, card stand and Lew Sayre Schwartz art card | The Man Behind the Red Hood! version |
| Wave 8 | Q3 2024 | 21 | Batman | Grappling hook, streetlight, 4 alternate hands, alternate unmasked head and Frank Miller art card | The Dark Knight Returns blue battle-damaged version Retool and redeco of the previous TDKR Batman with a tattered chest emblem and blue color scheme |
| Wave 8 | Q3 2024 | 22 | Tomar-Re | Power Battery, 2 alternate ring construct hands, 4 alternate hands, alternate Abin Sur head, shield construct, display stand, card stand and Brian Bolland art card | Green Lantern Corps version |
| Wave 8 | Q3 2024 | 23 | Huntress (Helena Wayne) | Crossbow, 4 alternate hands, 2 alternate faceplates, display stand and Guillem March art card | New 52 version |
| Wave 9 | Q4 2024 | 24 | Geo-Force | 2 alternate faceplates, 2 energy effect pieces, display stand and card | Infinite Frontier version Target exclusive |
| Wave 9 | Q4 2024 | 25 | Superman | Alternate head, 3 alternate hands, alternate Kryptonian crystal-holding hand, display stand and Christopher Reeve photo card | Superman: The Movie version |
| Wave 9 | Q4 2024 | 26 | Green Lantern (Simon Baz) | 2 alternate faceplates, 3 construct effect pieces, Power Battery, display stand and Robson Rocha art card | New 52 version |
| Wave 9 | Q4 2024 | 27 | Mister Terrific (Michael Holt) | 2 alternate faceplates, alternate hand, 3 T-Spheres, removable jacket, display stand and J.G. Jones art card | New 52 version |
| Wave 9 | Q4 2024 | 28 | Lightning Lad | Alternate classic head, 2 alternate faceplates, 4 electricity effect pieces, display stand and Jim Cheung art card | DC Rebirth version |
| Wave 9 | Q4 2024 | 29 | Grid | Display stand and card | Forever Evil version Heavy retool of the Flashpoint Cyborg BAF with a new head, arms and upper torso |
| Wave 10 | Q1 2025 | 30 | Captain Cold | Cold Gun, 2 alternate face plates, 4 alternate hands, display stand and Scott Kolins art card | DC Classic version |
| Wave 10 | Q1 2025 | 31 | Power Girl | Streaky the Supercat, 4 alternate hands, display stand and David Nakayama art card | JSA version |
| Wave 10 | Q1 2025 | 32 | Green Lantern (Guy Gardner) | Power Battery, 2 alternate face plates, alternate bowlcut hairpiece, 4 alternate hands, display stand and Doug Mahnke art card | Green Lantern Corps version |
| Wave 11 | Q2 2025 | 33 | Adam Strange | Ray gun, 3 alternate face plates, display stand and Evan Shaner art card | Strange Adventures version |
| Wave 11 | Q2 2025 | 34 | Batman | Alternate hands, gun, sickle, display stand and Todd McFarlane and Pablo Marcos art card | Batman: Year Two version |
| Wave 11 | Q2 2025 | 35 | Deadshot | 4 alternate hands, wrist blasters, wrist blasters with single-fire effects, wrist blasters with rapid-fire effects, display stand and card | Suicide Squad version |
| Wave 12 | Q3 2025 | 36 | Hawkgirl (Kendra Saunders) | Mace, alternate hands, display stand and card | JSA version |
| Wave 12 | Q3 2025 | 39 | Superman | Alternate lion head, alternate big head, display stand and card | The Strange Lives of Superman! version |
| Wave 12 | Q3 2025 | 40 | Merlyn the Dark Archer | Bow, quiver, display stand and card | |
| Wave 12 | Q3 2025 | 41 | Darkstars | Alternate battle-damaged head, display stand and Jordi Tarragona and Rafael Sandoval art card | |
| Wave 12 | Q3 2025 | 42 | Beast Boy | Pizza slice, 3 animal transformations, display stand and art card | One Year Later version San Diego Comic-Con exclusive |
| Wave 12 | Q3 2025 | 43 | Kite Man | Kite, 4 alternate hands, backpack, display stand and card | DC Rebirth version |
| Wave 12 | Q3 2025 | 44 | Metron | Mobius Chair, 2 alternate hands, display stand and card | New Gods version |
| Wave 12 | Q3 2025 | 45 | Mirror Master (Evan McCulloch) | 2 mirror guns, 6 alternate hands, display stand and card | Rogues version |
| Wave 12 | Q3 2025 | 46 | Deathstroke | 4 guns, 2 alternate hands, display stand and Mike Zeck art card | The Judas Contract version |
| Wave 13 | Fall 2025 | 47 | Doctor Mid-Nite (Charles McNider) | Owl, 4 alternate hands, display stand and Alan Davis art card | Golden Age version |
| Wave 13 | Fall 2025 | 48 | Batman | Mobius Chair, 2 alternate hands, batarang, display stand and Jason Fabok art card | Darkseid War version |
| Wave 14 | Winter 2025 | 49 | Blackhawk | Display stand and card | DC Classic version |
| Wave 14 | Winter 2025 | 50 | Elongated Man | 2 alternated elongated arms, display stand and card | Justice League of America version |
| Wave 14 | Winter 2025 | 51 | Cosmic Boy | Display stand and George Pérez art card | Final Crisis: Legion of 3 Worlds version |
| Wave 14 | Winter 2025 | 52 | Professor Pyg | Display stand and card | Batman and Robin version |
| Wave 14 | Winter 2025 | 53 | Zatanna | magic wand, display stand and Adam Hughes art card | DC Classic version |
| Wave 14 | Winter 2025 | 53 | Detective Chimp | Maria Wolf art card | DC Classic version |
| Wave 15 | Q2 2026 | 54 | Black Canary | Jacket, 2 swappable faceplates, 4 alternate hands, display stand and art card | DC Rebirth version |
| Wave 15 | Q2 2026 | 55 | Captain Marvel Jr. | 4 lighting effect pieces, 8 alternate hands, display stand and art card | DC Classic version |
| Wave 15 | Q2 2026 | 56 | Vigilante | 2 pistols, rifle, lasso, tomahawk, knife, display stand and art card | DC Classic version |
| Wave 15 | Q2 2026 | 57 | Joker | Hat, alternate hairpiece, pistol, flag gun, cane, megaphone, display stand and art card | Batman version |
| Wave 15 | Q2 2026 | 58 | Lobo | Gun, hook, blade, space dolphin, display stand and art card | DC Classic version Repaint of the Spacehog Lobo with new accessories |
| Wave 15 | Q2 2026 | 59 | Supergirl | Alternate faceplate, 6 alternate hands, display stand and art card | Action Comics first appearance version |
| Wave 16 | Q3 2026 | 61 | Wonder Woman | Lasso of Truth, sword, shield, axe, 4 alternate hands, display stand and art card | DC Classic version |
| Wave 16 | Q3 2026 | 62 | Poison Ivy | 2 vines, 2 alternate hands, display stand and Joshua Middleton art card | DC Classic version |
| Wave 16 | Q3 2026 | 63 | Hawkgirl (Kendra Saunders) | Mace, 4 alternate hands, display stand and art card | New Justice version |
| Wave 16 | Q3 2026 | 64 | Red Hood (Jason Todd) | Alternate unmasked head, 2 guns, crowbar, display stand and art card | Batman: Under the Hood version Repaint of the New 52 Red Hood |
| Wave 16 | Q3 2026 | 65 | Kilowog | Power Battery, hammer construct, display stand and art card | Repaint of the two-pack Kilowog |
| Wave 16 | Q3 2026 | 66 | Wonder Girl | art card | DC Classic |
| Wave 16 | Q3 2026 | 67 | Mera | art card | DC Classic |
| Wave 16 | Q3 2026 | 68 | Black Manta | art card | DC Classic |
| Wave 16 | Q3 2026 | 69 | Raven | art card | DC Classic |
| Wave 16 | Q3 2026 | 70 | Star Sapphire | art card | Green Lantern |
| Wave 16 | Q3 2026 | 71 | Superman | art card | Earth 2 |
| Wave 16 | Q3 2026 | 72 | Mary Shazam | art card | Shazam! |

==== Box Sets ====
McFarlane Toys Collectors Edition box sets
| Release | Set | # | Figure | Accessories | Description |
|---|---|---|---|---|---|
| Q4 2024 | All-Star Western | 1 | Jonah Hex | 2 pistols, tomahawk, knife, rifle, gun belt, fabric overcoat, cutlass, display stand and art card | Gray outfit |
| Q4 2024 | All-Star Western | 1 | The General | | Black fur |
| Q4 2024 | Armored Batman and Knightmare Batman | 2 | Armored Batman | 2 alternate hands, grenade, grenade, grappling gun and Ben Affleck photo card | Batman v Superman: Dawn of Justice battle-damaged version Retool of the standard BVS Armored Batman with a new head |
| Q4 2024 | Armored Batman and Knightmare Batman | 2 | Knightmare Batman | 3 guns, crossbow, rock display base, city backdrop and Ben Affleck photo card | Batman v Superman: Dawn of Justice; Retool of the standard Knightmare Batman with a new head |
| Q2 2025 | Dark Multiverse | 3 | The Grim Knight | Machine gun, grenade launcher, display stand and Tyler Kirkham art card | |
| Q2 2025 | Dark Multiverse | 3 | Killer Croc | Display stand and art card | Retool and repaint of Batman: Arkham Asylum version |
| Q3 2025 | Dark Multiverse | 4 | The Merciless | art card | Dark Multiverse |
| Q3 2025 | Dark Multiverse | 4 | The Batman Who Laughs (Knight Armor) | Doug Mahnke art card | Dark Multiverse |
| Q3 2026 | Batman | 5 | Batman | Adam West photo card | Batman TV Show |
| Q3 2026 | Batman | 5 | Robin | Burt Ward photo card | Batman TV Show |
| Q3 2026 | Batman vs. Ra's Al Ghul | 6 | Batman vs. Ra's Al Ghul | art card | |
| Q3 2026 | Superman Blue vs. Superman Red | 7 | Superman Blue vs. Superman Red | art card | Superman Red/Superman Blue |
| Q3 2026 | Batman & Spawn | 8 | Batman | art card | |
| Q3 2026 | Batman & Spawn | 8 | Spawn | art card | |

==== Chase - Platinum Edition ====
| Wave | Release | # | Figure | Accessories | Description |
|---|---|---|---|---|---|
| Wave 1 | Q3 2023 | 1 | Golden Age Superman | Chains, display stand, card stand and Detective Comics staff and Joe Shuster art card | Superman #1 version Darker blue tone, alternate S in a triangle shield and red boots |
| Wave 1 | Q3 2023 | 2 | Green Lantern (Alan Scott) | Lantern, fire construct, display stand, card stand and Alex Ross art card | Day of Vengeance version Glow in the Dark highlight Redeco |
| Wave 1 | Q3 2023 | 3 | Abyss | Scythe, alternate hand, display stand, card stand and Jorge Molina art card | Batman: Abyss version Red and white Redeco |
| Wave 2 | Q4 2023 | 4 | Firestorm (Ronnie Raymond) | 2 fire effects, 6 alternate hands, display stand, card stand, and Yıldıray Çınar art card | New 52 version |
| Wave 2 | Q4 2023 | 5 | Hawkman (Katar Hol) | Mace, wings, display stand, card stand and David Finch art card | Classic style Redeco of the Zero Hour Hawkman |
| Wave 2 | Q4 2023 | 6 | Sinestro | Construct, lantern, display stand, card stand and Tyler Kirkham art card | Green Lantern Corps uniform version |
| Wave 3 | Q1 2024 | 7 | Green Lantern Batman | Power Battery, 2 flame effect pieces, 4 alternate hands, display stand, art card and card stand | |
| Wave 3 | Q1 2024 | 8 | Captain Carrot | 4 alternate hands, display stand, Gary Frank art card and card stand | The Multiversity version |
| Wave 3 | Q1 2024 | 9 | Superman | Krypto, alternate hands, display stand, Dan Jurgens, Norm Rapmund, and Alex Sinclair art card and card stand | Return of Superman version Retool of the Dark Knight Returns Superman with a new mulleted head |
| Wave 4 | Q1 2024 | 10 | Wonder Woman | Battle axe, sword, 4 alternate hands, shield, lasso of truth, display stand, art card and card stand | Super Powers Collection version |
| Wave 5 | Q2 2024 | 11 | Blackfire | 2 starbolt effect pieces, flight stand, card stand and Sam Basri art card | Justice League Odyssey version |
| Wave 5 | Q2 2024 | 12 | Penguin | Umbrella, 2 alternate hands, display stand, card stand and Mike Grell art card | Super Powers Collection version |
| Wave 5 | Q2 2024 | 13 | White Lantern Captain Boomerang | 2 boomerangs 4 alternate hands, display stand, card stand and Francis Manapul art card | Brightest Day version |
| Wave 6 | Q3 2024 | 14 | Sgt. Rock | 4 alternate hands, knife, shovel, helmet, display stand, card stand, and Joe Kubert art card | |
| Wave 6 | Q3 2024 | 15 | Superboy | 2 alternate hands, 2 alternate heads, flight stand, environment stand, display stand and Stanley 'Artgerm' Lau art card | Teen Titans version |
| Wave 6 | Q3 2024 | 16 | Batman | 4 alternate hands, batarang, batcamera, grappling hook, GoGo magician wand, display stand and Jiro Kuwata art card | Bat-Manga version |
| San Diego Comic-Con exclusive | July 2024 | 17 | Agent Liberty | Shield, exhaust flame effect piece, display stand, card stand and art card | White costume version |
| Wave 7 | Q4 2024 | 18 | Doctor Tyme | 2 clock hand blades, display stand, card stand and Dan Spiegle art card | Redeco of Clock King with new face |
| Wave 7 | Q4 2024 | 19 | Ragman | 2 magic effect pieces, display stand, card and Jesús Saíz art card | Black costume version |
| Wave 7 | Q4 2024 | 20 | Red Hood | Pickaxe, dagger, display stand, card stand and Lew Sayre Schwartz art card | Purple tuxedo version |
| Wave 8 | TBA 2024 | 21 | Batman | Grappling hook, streetlight, 4 alternate hands, alternate unmasked head and Frank Miller art card | The Dark Knight Returns blue and gray version No battle damage |
| Wave 8 | TBA 2024 | 22 | Arkkis Chummuck | Power Battery, 2 alternate ring construct hands, 4 alternate hands, alternate Green Man head, shield construct, display stand, card stand and Brian Bolland art card | Green Lantern Corps version |
| Wave 8 | TBA 2024 | 23 | Huntress (Helena Bertinelli) | Crossbow, 4 alternate hands, 2 alternate faceplates, display stand and Guillem March art card | Batman/Huntress: Cry for Blood version |
| Wave 9 | Q4 2024 | 24 | Geo-Force | 2 alternate faceplates, 2 energy effect pieces, display stand and card | Outsiders version |
| Wave 9 | Q4 2024 | 25 | Evil Superman | Alternate head, 3 alternate hands, alternate Kryptonian crystal-holding hand, display stand and Christopher Reeve photo card | Superman III version |
| Wave 9 | Q4 2024 | 26 | Power Ring (Solomon Baz) | 2 alternate faceplates, 3 construct effect pieces, Power Battery, display stand and Robson Rocha art card | Earth-3 version |
| Wave 9 | Q4 2024 | 27 | Mister Terrific (Michael Holt) | 2 alternate faceplates, alternate hand, 3 T-Spheres, removable jacket, display stand and J.G. Jones art card | JSA version |
| Wave 9 | Q4 2024 | 28 | Lightning Lad | Alternate classic head, 2 alternate faceplates, 4 electricity effect pieces, display stand and Jim Cheung art card | Threeboot version |
| Wave 9 | Q4 2024 | 29 | Grid | Display stand and card | Green version |
| Wave 10 | Q1 2025 | 30 | Captain Cold | Cold Gun, 2 alternate face plates, 4 alternate hands, display stand and Scott Kolins art card | Super Friends version |
| Wave 10 | Q1 2025 | 31 | Power Girl | Streaky the Supercat, 4 alternate hands, display stand and David Nakayama art card | Dawn of DC version |
| Wave 10 | Q1 2025 | 32 | Guy Gardner | Yellow Lantern Power Battery, 2 alternate face plates, alternate bowlcut hairpiece, 4 alternate hands, display stand and Doug Mahnke art card | Guy Gardner Reborn version |
| Wave 11 | Q2 2025 | 33 | Adam Strange | Ray gun, 3 alternate face plates, display stand and Evan Shaner art card | Grey costume version |
| Wave 11 | Q2 2025 | 34 | Batman | Alternate hands, gun, sickle, display stand and Todd McFarlane and Pablo Marcos art card | Batman: Year Two version with blue holster |
| Wave 11 | Q2 2025 | 35 | Deadshot | 4 alternate hands, wrist blasters, wrist blasters with single-fire effects, wrist blasters with rapid-fire effects, display stand and card | Justice League Unlimited version |
| Wave 12 | Q3 2025 | 36 | Hawkwoman | Mace, alternate hands, display stand and card | Justice League of America version |
| Wave 12 | Q3 2025 | 39 | Superman Red | Alternate lion head, alternate big head, display stand and card | The Amazing Story of Superman-Red and Superman-Blue! version |
| Wave 12 | Q3 2025 | 40 | Dark Archer (Tommy Merlyn) | Bow, quiver, display stand and card | New 52 version |
| Wave 12 | Q3 2025 | 41 | Darkstar John Stewart | Alternate Ferrin Colos head, display stand and Jordi Tarragona and Rafael Sandoval art card | |
| Wave 12 | Q3 2025 | 42 | Beast Boy | Pizza slice, 3 animal transformations, display stand and art card | Teen Titans colors variant San Diego Comic-Con exclusive |
| Wave 12 | Q3 2025 | 43 | Kite Man | Kite, 4 alternate hands, backpack, display stand and card | DC Classic version |
| Wave 12 | Q3 2025 | 44 | Metron | Mobius Chair, 2 alernate hands, display stand and card | Dark Nights: Death Metal version |
| Wave 12 | Q3 2025 | 45 | Mirror Master (Sam Scudder) | 2 mirror guns, 6 alternate hands, display stand and card | DC Classic version |
| Wave 12 | Q3 2025 | 46 | Slade | 4 guns, 2 alternate hands, display stand and Mike Zeck art card | Teen Titans colors variant |
| Wave 13 | Fall 2025 | 47 | Doctor Mid-Nite (Pieter Cross) | Owl, 4 alternate hands, display stand and Alan Davis art card | JSA version |
| Wave 13 | Fall 2025 | 48 | Batman | Mobius Chair, 2 alternate hands, batarang, display stand and Jason Fabok art card | Darkseid War blue version |
| Wave 15 | Q2 2026 | 54 | Black Canary | Jacket, 2 swappable faceplates, 4 alternate hands, display stand and art card | Justice League Unlimited colors version |
| Wave 15 | Q2 2026 | 55 | Osiris | 4 lighting effect pieces, 8 alternate hands, display stand and art card | DC Classic version |
| Wave 15 | Q2 2026 | 56 | Vigilante | 2 pistols, rifle, lasso, tomahawk, knife, display stand and art card | Justice League Unlimited colors version |
| Wave 15 | Q2 2026 | 57 | Joker | Hat, alternate hairpiece, pistol, flag gun, cane, megaphone, display stand and art card | Batman Kenner colors version |
| Wave 15 | Q2 2026 | 58 | Lobo | Gun, hook, blade, space dolphin, display stand and art card | Classic blue colors version Repaint of the Spacehog Lobo with new accessories |
| Wave 15 | Q2 2026 | 59 | Supergirl | Alternate faceplate, 6 alternate hands, display stand and art card | Crisis On Infinite Earths version |
| Wave 15 | Q3 2026 | 61 | Wonder Woman | Lasso of Truth, sword, shield, axe, 4 alternate hands, display stand and art card | New 52 version |
| Wave 15 | Q3 2026 | 62 | Poison Ivy | 2 vines, 2 alternate hands, display stand and Joshua Middleton art card | Batman: Hush version |
| Wave 15 | Q3 2026 | 63 | Hawkgirl (Shiera Hall) | Mace, 4 alternate hands, display stand and art card | JSA version |

==== Platinum Box Sets ====
McFarlane Toys Collectors Edition box sets
| Release | Set | # | Figure | Accessories | Description |
|---|---|---|---|---|---|
| Q4 2024 | All-Star Western | 1 | Jonah Hex | 2 pistols, tomahawk, knife, rifle, gun belt, fabric overcoat, cutlass, display stand and art card | Blue outfit |
| Q4 2024 | All-Star Western | 1 | The General | | White fur |

==== Chase - Red Platinum ====
| Release | Figure | Accessories | Description |
|---|---|---|---|
| 2025 | Mister Terrific (Michael Holt) | 2 alternate faceplates, alternate hand, 3 T-Spheres, removable jacket, display stand and art card | Justice League Action version Repaint of the New 52 Mister Terrific |
| 2025 | Red Lantern Guy Gardner | Power Battery, 2 alternate face plates, alternate bowlcut hairpiece, 4 alternate hands, display stand and art card | Red Lanterns version Repaint of Guy Gardner |

== McFarlane figures - DC Page Punchers ==
Figures that come packaged with an exclusive comic book. Despite being branded under the DC Direct label, the figures are produced by McFarlane Toys and are designed to be in scale with the DC Multiverse line (with some bodies and other parts being reused between both series).

=== Single figures ===
McFarlane Toys action figures with comic
| Wave | Release | Figure | Accessories | Description |
|---|---|---|---|---|
| Wave 1 | Summer 2022 | Batman | Batarang, display stand, Black Adam comic, and Lee Bermejo art card | Lee Bermejo design version |
| Wave 1 | Summer 2022 | Batman | Batarang, display stand, black and white Black Adam comic, and Lee Bermejo art card | Black and white line art variant Target Exclusive |
| Wave 1 | Summer 2022 | Superman | Alternate hands, display stand, Black Adam comic, and Lee Bermejo art card | |
| Wave 1 | Summer 2022 | Black Adam | 2 lightning effect pieces, display stand, Black Adam comic, and Lee Bermejo art card | Lee Bermejo design version |
| Wave 1 | Summer 2022 | Black Adam | 2 lightning effect pieces, display stand, black and white Black Adam (Black Adam cover) comic, and Lee Bermejo art card | Black and white line art variant Walmart Exclusive |
| Wave 1 | Summer 2022 | John Constantine | Magic pentagram, book, display stand, Black Adam comic, and Lee Bermejo art card | |
| Wave 2 | Fall 2022 | Batman | 2 batarangs, display stand, Injustice comic, and José Luis and Jonas Trindade art card | Injustice 2 version |
| Wave 2 | Fall 2022 | Green Arrow | Bow, quiver, arrow bundle, display stand, Injustice comic, and José Luis and Jonas Trindade art card | Injustice 2 version Retool and redeco of the DC Multiverse Injustice 2 Green Arrow figure with a new, classic-style head |
| Wave 2 | Fall 2022 | The Flash (Barry Allen) | 2 lighting effect pieces, display stand, The Flash comic, and art card | Original design created for the line |
| Wave 2 | Fall 2022 | Atom (Ryan Choi) | Alternate hands, molecular effect piece, display stand, The Flash comic, and art card | Original design created for the line |
| Wave 2 | Fall 2022 | Captain Cold | Cold gun, display stand, The Flash comic, and art card | Original design created for the line |
| Wave 2 | Fall 2022 | Heat Wave | Display stand, The Flash comic, and art card | Original design created for the line |
| Wave 2 | Spring 2023 | Supergirl | Display stand, Injustice comic, and José Luis and Jonas Trindade art card | Injustice 2 version |
| Wave 2 | Spring 2023 | Doctor Fate | Display stand, Injustice comic, and José Luis and Jonas Trindade art card | Injustice 2 version Retool of the previous DC Multiverse Doctor Fate figure with a new headsculpt |
| Wave 3 | Spring 2023 | Aquaman | Trident, display stand, Aquaman comic (Aquaman cover), and Pop Mhan art card | Original design created for the line |
| Wave 3 | Spring 2023 | Black Manta | Spear, display stand, Aquaman comic (Black Manta cover), and Edwin Galmon art card | Original design created for the line |
| Wave 3 | Spring 2023 | Ocean Master | Trident, display stand, Aquaman comic (Ocean Master cover), and Norm Rapmund art card | Original design created for the line |
| Wave 3 | Spring 2023 | Aqualad (Jackson Hyde) | 2 swords, display stand, Aquaman comic (Aqualad cover), and David Marquez art card | Aquaman: The Becoming version |
| Wave 4 | Summer 2023 | Batman | Display stand, Batman comic, and InHyuk Lee art card | Batman: Fighting the Frozen version Original design created for the line |
| Wave 4 | Summer 2023 | Batgirl | Display stand, Batman comic, and Emanuela Lupacchino art card | Batman: Fighting the Frozen version Original design created for the line |
| Wave 4 | Summer 2023 | Mr. Freeze | Display stand, Batman comic, and art card | Batman: Fighting the Frozen version Original design created for the line |
| Wave 4 | Summer 2023 | Robin | Display stand, Batman comic, and V Ken Marion and House art card | Batman: Fighting the Frozen version Original design created for the line |
| Wave 5 | Spring 2024 | Superman | 7 armor pieces, display stand, Superman: Ghosts of Krypton #1 and Fico Ossio art card | Original design created for the line |
| Wave 5 | Spring 2024 | Ghost of Zod | 4 alternate hands, display stand, Superman: Ghosts of Krypton #2 and art card | Original design created for the line |
| Wave 5 | Spring 2024 | Superman (Val-Zod) | Display stand, Superman: Ghosts of Krypton #3 and Edwin Galmon art card | Original design created for the line |
| Wave 5 | Spring 2024 | Brainiac | 5 limb pieces, display stand, Superman: Ghosts of Krypton #4 and art card | Original design created for the line |
| Wave 6 | Fall 2024 | Robin (Damian Wayne) | Sword, Professor Pyg mask, display stand, Batman and Robin #1 and Frank Quitely art card | Batman and Robin version |
| Wave 6 | Fall 2024 | Deathstroke | Sword, staff, hook sword, alternate unmasked head, display stand, Deathstroke #1 and Tony Daniel art card | DC Rebirth version Retool and redeco of the Rebirth Deathstroke with a new unmasked head and accessories |
| Wave 6 | Fall 2024 | Superman | Display stand, Superman '78 #1 and Wilfredo Torres art card | Superman '78 version Cel-shaded redeco of the Christopher Reeve Superman |
| Wave 6 | Fall 2024 | Shazam | Cape clasp, 2 alternate hands, display stand, comic and Cameron Stewart art card | Dawn of DC version |
| Wave 7 | Q2 2025 | Supergirl | Sword, comic, display stand and Bilquis Evely and Mat Lopes art card | Supergirl: Woman of Tomorrow version |
| Wave 7 | Q2 2025 | Superman | Comic, flight stand and Alex Ross art card | Kingdom Come version |
| Wave 7 | Q2 2025 | Damage | Comic, display stand and Alex Ross art card | JSA version |
| Wave 7 | Q2 2025 | Starman (Thom Kallor) | Comic, display stand and Alex Ross art card | JSA version |
| Wave 8 | Q3 2025 | Earth-2 Wonder Woman | Comic, display stand and Harry G. Peter art card | Golden Age version |
| Wave 8 | Q3 2025 | Steve Trevor | Comic, display stand and card | Golden Age version |
| Wave 8 | Q3 2025 | Superboy | Comic, display stand and Dan Jurgens art card | Return of Superman version |
| Wave 8 | Q3 2025 | Mister Bones | Comic, display stand and Todd McFarlane and Tony DeZuniga art card | Infinity, Inc. version |
| Wave 8 | Q3 2025 | Obsidian | 3 alternate hands, comic, display stand and art card | JSA version |
| Wave 9 | Q4 2025 | Joker | Comic, pistol, coat, hat, display stand and George Perez art card | Crisis on Infinite Earths version Repaint and retool of the Silver Age Joker with a new head and accessories |
| Wave 9 | Q4 2025 | Superman | Comic, 2 alternate hands, display stand and Dan Jurgens art card | Zero Hour: Crisis in Time! version |
| Wave 9 | Q4 2025 | Extant | Comic, display stand and card | Zero Hour: Crisis in Time! version |
| Wave 9 | Q4 2025 | Cheetah (Priscilla Rich) | Comic, display stand and George Pérez and Anthony Tollin art card | Crisis on Infinite Earths version |
| Wave 10 | Spring 2026 | Green Lantern (Hal Jordan) | Comic, display stand and Bruno Redondo art card | New 52 version |
| Wave 10 | Spring 2026 | Green Lantern (Jessica Cruz) | Comic, 2 flame effect pieces, display stand and Leonardo Romero art card | New 52 version |
| Wave 10 | Spring 2026 | Flash (Barry Allen) | Comic, display stand and Carmine Infantino, Murphy Anderson, and Ira Schnapp art card | Flash of Two Worlds version |
| Wave 10 | Spring 2026 | Flash (Jay Garrick) | Comic, display stand and Carmine Infantino, Murphy Anderson, and Ira Schnapp art card | Flash of Two Worlds version |
| Wave 11 | Q2 2026 | Robin (Tim Drake) | Comic, display stand and art card | Teen Titans version |
| Wave 11 | Q2 2026 | Martian Manhunter | Comic, display stand and art card | Justice League International version |
| Wave 11 | Q2 2026 | Miss Martian | Comic, display stand and Tony Daniel and Kevin Conrad art card | Teen Titans version |
| Wave 11 | Q2 2026 | Bloodwynd | Comic, display stand and Dan Jurgens and Gene D’Angelo art card | Justice League America version |
| Wave 12 | Q3 2026 | Batman | Comic, display stand and Joe Quinones art card | Batman '89 version |
| Wave 12 | Q3 2026 | Two-Face | Comic, display stand and Joe Quinones art card | Batman '89 version |
| Wave 12 | Q3 2026 | Superman | Comic, 2 alternate hands, display stand and Alex Ross and Doug Braithwaite art card | Justice version |
| Wave 12 | Q3 2026 | Batman | Comic, 2 alternate hands, display stand and Alex Ross and Doug Braithwaite art card | Justice version |

==== MegaFigs ====
| Release | Figure | Accessories | Description |
|---|---|---|---|
| Fall 2022 | Gorilla Grodd | Display stand, The Flash comic, and art card | Original design created for the line |

=== Gold Label Collection ===
| Wave | Release | Figure | Accessories | Exclusivity | Description |
|---|---|---|---|---|---|
| Wave 2 | Fall 2022 | Captain Cold | Cold gun, display stand, The Flash comic and alternate Scott Kolins art card | McFarlane Toys Store | Repaint of original design created for the line |
| Wave 4 | Summer 2023 | Mr. Freeze | Display stand, Batman comic, and Philip Tran art card | SDCC | Repaint of original design created for the line |
| Wave 5 | Q4 2023 | Batman Santa (Blue) | Presents bag, display stand and art print | McFarlane Toys Store | Red repaint of Endless Winter version with alternate head |
| Wave 5 | Q4 2023 | Batman Santa (Red) | Presents bag, display stand and art print | McFarlane Toys Store | Blue repaint of Endless Winter version with alternate head |

=== Chase - Platinum Edition ===
| Wave | Release | Figure | Accessories | Description |
|---|---|---|---|---|
| Wave 4 | Summer 2023 | Batgirl | Display stand, Batman comic, and art card | Repaint of original design created for the line |
| Wave 6 | Fall 2024 | Robin (Damian Wayne) | Sword, Professor Pyg mask, display stand, Batman and Robin #1 and Frank Quitely art card | Batman and Son version Repaint of the Damian Wayne figure |
| Wave 6 | Fall 2024 | Captain Thunder | Cape clasp, 2 alternate hands, display stand, comic and Cameron Stewart art card | Make Way for Captain Thunder! version Repaint of the Shazam figure |
| Wave 8 | Q3 2025 | Superboy | Comic, display stand and card | New 52 version |

== McFarlane figures - Digital ==
Figures that are digital. The figures are produced by McFarlane Toys and are designed to be a digital counterpart to the physical DC Multiverse line figures. Listing moved to its own subset as a digital line and physical line are not referred to as "the same line", but complimentary ones and have different subsets of their own such as rarity.

=== Digital Only ===
| Release | Figure | Rarity | Description |
|---|---|---|---|
| Q2 2023 | Batman - Animated | Rare | Year 2 version |
| Q2 2023 | Batman - Animated | Epic - Black and White | Year 2 version |
| Q2 2023 | Batman - Animated | Legendary - Signed | Year 2 version |
| Q2 2023 | Batman - Animated | Exotic - Black and White, Signed in Red | Year 2 version |
| Q2 2023 | Batman - Animated | Exotic - Signed in Red | Year 2 version |
| Q3 2023 | Blue Beetle in flight | Legendary | Blue Beetle version |
| Q3 2023 | Blue Beetle with sword | Rare | Blue Beetle version |
| Q3 2023 | Carapax | Epic | Blue Beetle version |
| Q3 2023 | Sword (Blue Beetle's) | Legendary | Blue Beetle version |
| Q3 2023 | Superman | Legendary | 85th Anniversary version |
| Q3 2023 | Bane | Rare | Batman: Knightfall version |
| Q3 2023 | Bane | Legendary - Red Tubes | Batman: Knightfall version |
| Q3 2023 | Bane | Exotic - Purple Tubes | Batman: Knightfall version |
| Q4 2023 | Catwoman | Epic - Purple | Batman: Knightfall version |
| Q4 2023 | Catwoman | Legendary - Grey | Batman: Knightfall version |
| Q4 2023 | Green Lantern (Hal Jordan) | Common - Green | DC Rebirth version |
| Q4 2023 | Green Lantern (Hal Jordan) | Epic - Yellow | DC Rebirth version |
| Q4 2023 | Green Lantern (Hal Jordan) | Legendary - Red | DC Rebirth version |
| Q4 2023 | Green Lantern (Hal Jordan) | Exotic - Black | DC Rebirth version |
| Q4 2023 | Batwing (The Flash) | Epic - Black | The flash movie version |
| Q4 2023 | Batwing (The Flash) | Legendary - White | The flash movie version |
| Q4 2023 | Batwing (The Flash) | Exotic - Jokerized | The flash movie version |
| Q4 2023 | Superman Action Comics 1 | Epic - Green | Action Comics 1 version |
| Q4 2023 | Superman Action Comics 1 | Legendary - Yellow | Action Comics 1 version |
| Q4 2023 | Superman Action Comics 1 | Exotic - Black | Action Comics 1 version |
| Q4 2023 | Martian Manhunter | Epic - Standard | DC Rebirth version |
| Q4 2023 | Martian Manhunter | Legendary - Red Accent | DC Rebirth version |
| Q4 2023 | Martian Manhunter | Exotic - Red Accent (Signed) | DC Rebirth version |
| Q4 2023 | Mr. Freeze | Rare - Standard | Victor Fries version |
| Q4 2023 | Mr. Freeze | Epic - Blue | Victor Fries version |
| Q4 2023 | Mr. Freeze | Legendary - Black | Victor Fries version |
| Q4 2023 | Doomsday | Epic - Grey | Reign of Supermen version |
| Q4 2023 | Doomsday | Legendary - Lava | Reign of Supermen version |
| Q4 2023 | Doomsday | Exotic - Kryptonite | Reign of Supermen version |
| Q4 2023 | Batman & Bane | Rare - Blue / Green | Batman: Knightfall version |
| Q4 2023 | Batman & Bane | Epic - Blue / Red | Batman: Knightfall version |
| Q4 2023 | Batman & Bane | Legendary - Black / red | Batman: Knightfall version |
| Q4 2023 | Batman & Bane | Exotic - Black / Blue | Batman: Knightfall version |
| Q4 2023 | Batman | Rare - Blue | Batman: Knightfall version |
| Q4 2023 | Batman | Legendary - Black | Batman: Knightfall version |
| Q4 2023 | Deathstroke | Rare - Black | DC Rebirth version |
| Q4 2023 | Deathstroke | Epic - Blue | DC Rebirth version |
| Q4 2023 | Deathstroke | Legendary - Black & White | DC Rebirth version |
| Q4 2023 | Deathstroke | Legendary - Bronze | DC Rebirth version |
| Q4 2023 | Superman (Animated) | Rare - Blue | Action Comics 1000 version |
| Q4 2023 | Superman (Animated) | Legendary - Black | Action Comics 1000 version |
| Q4 2023 | Batmobile | Rare - Black | |
| Q4 2023 | Bane | Rare - Green | Batman: Knightfall version |
| Q4 2023 | Bane | Legendary - Red | Batman: Knightfall version |
| Q4 2023 | Bane | Exotic - Blue | Batman: Knightfall version |
| Q4 2023 | Superman | Legendary - Red | 85th anniversary version |

=== Standard figures with digital ===
| Release | Figure | Accessories | Rarity | Description |
|---|---|---|---|---|
| Q2 2024 | Batman | Alternate unmasked head, batarang, grappling pistol, 2 alternate hands, display stand, digital code, and Jim Lee art card | | DC Rebirth version Blue repaint of the previous Rebirth Batman with a new head |
| Q2 2024 | Green Lantern (Hal Jordan) | Power Battery, 2 flame effect pieces, 2 alternate hands, display stand, digital code, and Matt Taylor art card | | Classic version |
| Q2 2024 | Aquaman | Qwsp, alternate hands, alternate head, trident, digital code, and Paul Pelletier art card | | Classic version Retool of the Endless Winter Aquaman with a new head |
| Q3 2024 | Superman | Bald eagle, display stand and Mike Wieringo and José Marzan Jr. art card | | Our Worlds at War version Redeco of the Dark Knight Returns Superman with a new head |
| Q3 2024 | Green Arrow | Bow, quiver, arrow, arrow bundle, display stand and Juan Ferreyra art card | | Green Arrow: The Longbow Hunters version |
| Q3 2024 | Atom (Ray Palmer) | Miniature Atom, display stand and Gary Frank and Brad Anderson art card | | Classic version |
| Q4 2024 | Joker | Alternate hands, Laughing Fish, cane, display stand and José Luis García-López art card | | Silver Age version |
| Q4 2024 | Earth-2 Robin | Batarang, alternate head and hands, display stand and art card | | Crisis On Infinite Earths version |
| Q4 2024 | The Flash (Barry Allen) | Alternate unmasked head, display stand and card | | DC Classic version Repaint of the Cyborg BAF wave Flash |
| Q2 2025 | Superman | Alternate hands, display stand and card | | DC: The Silver Age version |
| Q2 2025 | Doctor Fate | Display stand and art card | | DC: The Silver Age version |
| Q2 2025 | Two-Face | Display stand and art card | | DC: The Silver Age version |
| Q3 2025 | Batgirl (Stephanie Brown) | Grappling hook pistol, batarang, display stand and art card | | Batgirls version |
| Q3 2025 | Nightwing | Wing-Ding, display stand and George Perez art card | | The Judas Contract version |
| Q3 2025 | Monarch | Display stand and art card | | Armageddon 2001 version |
| Q3 2025 | Batman | Batarang, alternate hands, display stand and art card | | Batman: No Man's Land version |
| Q4 2025 | Batgirl (Barbara Gordon) | Batarang and grappling hook pistol | | Batman colors version Purple repaint of the Three Jokers Batgirl |
| Q4 2025 | Red Tornado | 2 alternate hands, display stand and card | | Bronze Age version |
| Q4 2025 | Blackfire | 2 starbolt effect pieces, display stand and George Perez art card | | New Teen Titans version Repaint of Starfire |

=== Mega figures (12" Statue) with digital ===
| Release | Figure | Accessories | Rarity | Description |
|---|---|---|---|---|
| Q3 2023 | Batman | Display stand, digital code, and Todd McFarlane art card | | Epic - Standard |
| Q3 2023 | Batman | Display stand, digital code, and Todd McFarlane art card | | Exotic - Jokerized |
| Q3 2023 | Batman | Display stand, digital code, and Todd McFarlane art card | | Legendary - Black |

== McFarlane Toys Collectors Club Drawing Board ==
Crowdfunded releases too large or expensive for traditional retail releases.

| Release | Set | Figure | Accessories | Description |
|---|---|---|---|---|
| 2025 | Batmobile | Batmobile | 3 attachable guns and autographed metal poster | Justice League version |
| 2025 | Batmobile | Batman | Bat-Signal | Justice League version Rerelease of the Zack Snyder's Justice League Batman |
| 2025 | Batmobile | Superman | Kryptonite spear and card | Zack Snyder's Justice League: Justice is Gray version Grayscale repaint of the Batman v Superman Superman |
| 2025 | Batmobile | Wonder Woman | Sword, shield, Lasso of Truth and card | Zack Snyder's Justice League: Justice is Gray version Grayscale repaint of the Batman v Superman Wonder Woman |
| 2025 | Batmobile | Batman | Batarang, 2 alternate hands and card | Zack Snyder's Justice League: Justice is Gray version Grayscale repaint of the Batman v Superman Batman |
| 2025 | Harley Quinn | Harley Quinn | Pistol, revolver, baseball bat, mallet, 6 alternate hands, 4 alternate faceplates, jacket piece, 2 alternate jacketed arms, movie poster, 3 temporary tattoos, display base and Margot Robbie photo card | Suicide Squad version |
| 2025 | Harley Quinn | Joker | | Suicide Squad version |
| 2025 | Harley Quinn | Harley Quinn | | Suicide Squad classic comic colors version |

== See also ==
- Marvel Legends
- DC Universe Classics
