= Year of the Villain =

2019–2020 DC Comics crossover event

- Official promotional logo

Publication information
- Publisher: DC Comics
- Genre: Superhero
- Publication date: May 2019 – March 2020
- Main character(s): Lex Luthor; Perpetua; The Batman Who Laughs; The DC Universe

Year of the Villain was a crossover comic book event published by DC Comics. Beginning May 2019, the event narrated the aftermath of Dark Nights: Metal and the prelude to Batman/Superman vs. The Secret Six and Dark Nights: Death Metal. The crossover and one-shots received generally positive reviews for the characterization of certain villains.

== Background ==
The event was officially announced on February 13, 2019, with DC naming 2019 "The Year of the Villain." The event would feature stories written by several authors, with a focus on spotlighting popular DC villains. The event began on May 1, 2019, with the release of an exclusive 32-page comic titled DC's Year of the Villain, ahead of Free Comic Book Day on May 4th.

== Prelude ==
After the Source Wall was shattered, four entities known as the Omega Titans began invading Colu, forcing Brainiac to summon the Justice League for help. But as Amanda Waller and the new Task Force XI destroyed him, his great-great-grandson Brainiac 5 informs the League that Brainiac was using them to make sure the Omega Titans would destroy Earth, so there can be no interference for him.

Over time, Lex Luthor found a mysterious object related to an unknown force known as the Totality, while forging a new Legion of Doom, which includes a revived Brainiac and The Batman Who Laughs. The Totality is presumed to be linked to Perpetua, an ancient goddess who was made to vanish by her three children, the Monitor, the Anti-Monitor and the World Forger.

After faking his death through a bombing and with Perpetua's help, Luthor manages to transform himself into a human/Martian hybrid version of himself called "Apex Lex".

== Main plot ==
=== "The Offer" ===
Apex Lex recruits several supervillains to join Perpetua's cause, in exchange of giving them a source of unlimited power. In response, the Justice League recruits heroes around the universe to fight against the new Legion of Doom.

=== "Dark Gifts" ===
The villains debut their newly acquired powers from Lex's offer, leading to the Justice/Doom War.

=== "Evil Unleashed" ===
The heroes deal with the consequences caused by the new powers that the villains gained from Perpetua.

=== "Doom Rising" ===
Perpetua began forming a symbol when heroes and villains began their clashes as she announced the rise of Doom.

=== "Hostile Takeover" ===
The villains have unleashed their true power onto the world.

=== "Hell Arisen" ===
Apex Lex has freed Perpetua, but they both must overcome The Batman Who Laughs first.

== Titles involved ==
| Title | Issue(s) | Writer(s) | Artist(s) | Notes |
Preludes
| Justice League | #25–39 | Scott Snyder, James Tynion IV | Jorge Jimenez, Javier Fernandez | |
| Year of the Villain | #1 | Various | Various | |
| Year of the Villain: Hell Arisen | #1–4 | James Tynion IV | Steve Epting | Finale of the storyline |
Tie-in series
| Action Comics | #1013–1017 | Brian Michael Bendis | Szymon Kudranski | |
| Aquaman | #50–55 | Kelly Sue DeConnick | Robson Rocha, Daniel Henriques | |
| Batgirl | #37–40 | Cecil Castellucci | Carmine di Giandomenico | |
| Batman | #75–85 | Tom King | Tony S. Daniel | "City of Bane" arc |
| Batman and the Outsiders | #3–7 | Bryan Hill | Dexter Soy | |
| Detective Comics | #1008–1016 | Peter J. Tomasi | Doug Mahnke, Jamie Mendoza | |
| Batman/Superman | #1–6 | Joshua Williamson | David Marquez | "The Infected" arc |
| Catwoman | #13–17 | Joelle Jones | Joelle Jones, Fernando Blanco | |
| Deathstroke | #45–50 | Christopher Priest | Fernando Pasarin | |
| Event Leviathan | #1–6 | Brian Michael Bendis | Alex Maleev | |
| The Flash | #75–86 | Joshua Williamson | Howard Porter, Christian Duce, Scott Kolins | |
| Harley Quinn | #63–67 | Sam Humphries | Otto Schmit, Sami Basri, Dan Jurgens, Norm Rapmund, Aaron Lopresti, Matt Ryan, Tom Derenick, Trevor Scott | |
| Harley Quinn and Poison Ivy | #1–6 | Jody Houser | Adriana Melo | |
| Hawkman | #14–22 | Robert Venditti | Patrick Olliffe, Tom Palmer | #17-22 part of "The Infected" arc |
| Justice League Dark | #13–19 | Mark Buckingham, Daniel Sampere | | |
| Justice League Odyssey | #11–15 | Dan Abnett | Will Conrad | |
| Nightwing | #62–68 | Dan Jurgens | Ronan Cliquet | |
| Red Hood: Outlaw | #36–41 | Scott Lobdell | Pete Woods | |
| Supergirl | #34–39 | Marc Andreyko | Kevin Maguire | #34-35 part of "Event Leviathan" arc #36-39 part of "The Infected" arc |
| Superman | #13, 18–22 | Brian Michael Bendis | Ivan Reis, Joe Prado | |
| Teen Titans | #32–38 | Brian Michael Bendis | Adam Glass, Bernard Chang | |
| The Terrifics | #18–24 | Gene Luen Yang | Stephen Segovia | |
| Wonder Woman | #75–750 | G. Willow Wilson | Xermanico | |
One-shots
| Harley Quinn's Villain of the Year | #1 | Mark Russell | Mike Norton and Amanda Conner | |
| Black Adam: Year of the Villain | #1 | Paul Jenkins | Inaki Miranda | "The Infected" tie-in |
| Black Mask: Year of the Villain | #1 | Tom Taylor | Cully Hamner | |
| The Joker: Year of the Villain | #1 | John Carpenter, Anthony Burch | Phillip Tan, Marc Deering | |
| Lex Luthor: Year of the Villain | #1 | Jason Latour | Bryan Hitch, Andrew Currie | |
| Ocean Master: Year of the Villain | #1 | Dan Watters | Miguel Mendonça | |
| The Riddler: Year of the Villain | #1 | Mark Russell | Scott Godlewski | |
| Sinestro: Year of the Villain | #1 | Mark Russell | Brandon Peterson | |
| The Infected: The Commissioner | #1 | Paul Jenkins | Jack Herbert | "The Infected" arc |
| The Infected: Deathbringer | #1 | Zoë Quinn | Ben Oliver | "The Infected" arc |
| The Infected: King Shazam! | #1 | Sina Grace | Joe Bennett | "The Infected" arc |
| The Infected: Scarab | #1 | Dennis "Hopeless" Hallum | Freddie Williams II | "The Infected" arc |

== Critical reception ==
The one-shots of this crossover received generally positive reviews. According to Comic Book Roundup, the one-shots received an average score of 7.8 out of 10.

== Future ==
Between July 2018 and March 2019, Scott Snyder announced Year of the Villain will be followed by Dark Nights: Death Metal, a crossover event for 2020 that is a sequel to Dark Nights: Metal. Snyder stated: "Everything is coming back, we want to pay it forward. The Omega Titans, Barbatos, the Forge, it's all coming back. Everything you read, our goal is to reward. All of it culminates in like a year in like a Metal event."

== Collected editions ==
| Title | Material collected | Published date | ISBN |
|---|---|---|---|
| Year of the Villain: Hell Arisen | Year of the Villain: Hell Arisen #1–4, Year of the Villain #1 | June 2020 | 978-1779502421 |
| Year of the Villain: The Infected | The Infected: King Shazam! #1, The Infected: Scarab #1, The Infected: Deathbringer #1, The Infected: The Commissioner #1 | June 2020 | 978-1779502544 |
