= Dark Nights: Death Metal =

2020–2021 comic book storyline published by DC Comics

- Promotional ad for Dark Nights: Death Metal by Greg Capullo

Publication information
- Publisher: DC Comics
- Schedule: Monthly
- Format: Limited series
- Genre: Superhero
- Publication date: June 16, 2020 – January 5, 2021
- No. of issues: 7
- Main character(s): Wonder Woman; Batman; Superman; Superboy-Prime; The Batman Who Laughs; Robin King; Sgt. Rock; Harley Quinn; Wally West; Jonah Hex; Swamp Thing; Jarro; Perpetua

Creative team
- Written by: Scott Snyder
- Penciller: Greg Capullo
- Inker: Jonathan Glapion
- Letterer: Tom Napolitano
- Colorist: FCO Plascencia

"Dark Nights: Death Metal" is a 2020–2021 comic book storyline published by the comic book publishing company DC Comics, consisting of an eponymous central miniseries by writer Scott Snyder and artist Greg Capullo, and a number of tie-in books. The seven-issue miniseries was released from June 16, 2020, to January 5, 2021. The crossover was received with acclaim, with critics praising the unique plot, the art, the action, and the ending. It serves as the conclusion of the five-year Dark Multiverse Saga, taking place near the end of the New Justice era.

== Publication history ==
"Dark Nights: Death Metal" is the sequel to 2017's "Dark Nights: Metal" and concludes Scott Snyder's run in DC Comics; he stated "Everything is coming back, we want to pay it forward. The Omega Titans, Barbatos, the Forge, it's all coming back. Everything you read, our goal is to reward. All of it culminates in like a year in like a "Metal" event." "Death Metal" not only concludes the three-year spanning Dark Multiverse narrative that began with "Dark Nights: Metal", but will bring an end to the New 52 and DC Rebirth continuities that began with 2011's "Flashpoint" storyline.

In April 2020 during an interview on DC Daily, Snyder assured that the purpose of "Death Metal" is to unify every storyline from mainline DC Universe comic books, including the standalone stories.

The series was set to launch on May 13, 2020, but was rescheduled to June 16 due to the COVID-19 pandemic.

== Background ==
Following the final battle between Batman and the Batman Who Laughs, the Source Wall is shattered, causing a chain of events that frees Perpetua from her cosmic prison. Despite Apex Lex capturing the Batman Who Laughs, the latter reveals that the future Lex saw was a hoax made by Perpetua to manipulate him. After this revelation, Perpetua strips Lex of his powers and returns him to Earth. She starts to get the inhabitants of some of the Earths on her side, like the Crime Syndicate of America of the revived Earth 3.

Meanwhile, the Justice League survived their battle with Perpetua after they were saved by the Quintessence, who reveal they were protecting something very important. The Quintessence then sent the League to an unknown location in order to search for it.

Somewhere, Tempus Fuginaut revised several Earths from the Dark Multiverse and then recruits Wally West to access Metron's Mobius Chair (which is upgraded with Doctor Manhattan's powers) and restore the balance between the Light and Dark Multiverses. This action causes Wally to assume a new persona and, with his new powers, he wants to mend all of reality into one single timeline, but the presence of the Batman Who Laughs prevents that from happening.

== Plot ==
=== Issue #1 ===
The goddess Perpetua, who is destroying all realities to restart the Multiverse in her image, takes over Prime Earth. Her lieutenant, the Batman Who Laughs, aided by an army of evil Batmen from the Dark Multiverse, enforces her rule. All resistance has been crushed, and Earth's heroes have been impressed into her servitude. However, a mysterious prisoner awakens memories in Warden Wonder Woman, who rules over the Tartarus Pits of Hell (formerly Themyscira).

A meeting with the Batman Who Laughs' Justice League—consisting of Harley Quinn, Aquaman, Wonder Woman, and Mister Miracle, who are each paired with a Dark Knight of the Dark Multiverse—is interrupted by the main Batman. Wonder Woman argues with her former teammates, saying that they need to fix everything, not just what is left. Wonder Woman returns to the Tartarus Pits and discovers that the mysterious prisoner is Wally West. He retells Diana the story of Perpetua and how she covertly manipulated many previous Crises. Wonder Woman decides to create the first Anti-Crisis and is confronted by the Batman Who Laughs, whom she kills with the invisible Chainsaw of Truth. Though dead, the Dark Knights work to unleash the Batman Who Laughs' true plan of preparing the body of the final Bruce Wayne. In an underground bunker, Batman enlists the help of a severed Sgt. Rock.

=== Issue #2 ===
In the Hellscape (outside of what used to be Washington, D.C.), Wonder Woman, Wally West, and Swamp Thing go to Valhalla Cemetery, a secret graveyard guarded by the surviving members of the JSA: Alan Scott, Jay Garrick, Doctor Fate and Wildcat. There, Batman and Jonah Hex work to conscript an army from the tombs in the crypt, which include Atom, Black Condor, Dove, Johnny Quick, Phantom Lady, and Sandman, among others.

Batman plans to take Castle Bat, a version of Bruce Wayne who became a living Gotham City, to forge a new Earth. Meanwhile, Diana plans to travel to the original Crises through the Dark Universe, steal the energy taken by Perpetua, and give it to Wally, who would then restart the Multiverse. Jay calls in Barry Allen, who takes Wonder Woman and Batman to New Apokolips, a prison that houses the remaining heroes, to save their friends. At Castle Bat, the Dark Knights secretly transfer the Batman Who Laughs' brain into an energy construct based on Doctor Manhattan's powers.

Perpetua ravishes Earth-30 and warns the Batman Who Laughs of similar beings that may try to destroy her. The Batman Who Laughs proceeds to wipe out the remaining Dark Knights, except for one Robin, whom he decides to make the "Robin King"; he then transforms into the Darkest Knight. He exclaims that he knows of Diana's plans, and he plans to create "52 Planets of Nightmares". In the Arkham Wastes, Wonder Woman, Batman, Barry, Jonah Hex, and Harley Quinn enther the Toymaster's workshop to use his stealth ship designed as a composite version of Superman, Batman, and Wonder Woman to head to New Apokolips.

=== Legends of the Dark Knights ===
Prior to events, the Batman Who Laughs recruited five new Dark Knight members:

- The Robin King, a psychotic child version of Bruce Wayne who kills anyone, even his own family, to get what he wants.
- Batmansaurus Rex, a Batman who turned his body into a robot dinosaur.
- Castle Bat, a Batman who killed his son as part of a ritual to transfer his soul into Gotham City.
- Batmobeast, a Batman who transferred his soul into a cybernetic vehicle.
- Baby Batman, a Batman who made himself a cloned body in order to still live but who was reborn prematurely.

In the middle of this, the Batman Who Laughs discovers the existence of Batmanhattan (the "final" Bruce Wayne), who replicated the formula of Doctor Manhattan's powers. The Batman Who Laughs incapacitated Manhattan to access his body and transform into the Darkest Knight.

=== Issue #3 ===
On New Apokolips, Wonder Woman's team defeats an army of Para-Robins, hybrids of Parademons and various Robins. The planet's ruler, Darkfather, is a version of Batman who absorbed the powers of Darkseid. Batman works to free Superman from Darkfather's torture machine, but Darkfather shoots him. The gun, which was modified to erase Batman from history, has no effect. Superman breaks free with Batman's Black Lantern ring and punches Darkfather into space. They free the remaining heroes, and Wonder Woman relays her plan to save all reality.

The heroes use Jarro, the baby Starro, to avoid detection from the Dark Knights and re-enter the Dark Multiverse. Meanwhile, the Darkest Knight and the Robin King break into Valhalla Cemetery. Knowing that he is there to steal Wally's powers, Jay Garrick, Barry Allen, and Wally West lead Darkest Knight into a chase. Lobo acquires the fifth and final box of "Death Metal" needed for his employer, Lex Luthor, who is planning to begin work on his own reality-warping plans.

=== Dark Nights: Death Metal Guidebook ===
Lex Luthor narrates the invasion of Earth by the Dark Knights, led by the Batman Who Laughs. The irradiated Western Coast split off and became the Arkham Wastelands, where Harley Quinn rules under Doctor Arkham. The East Coast becomes Megaopokalips, transformed by Darkfather. Gotham City split off into its own continent, where it replaces Canada and contains the Batman Who Laughs' headquarters, Castle Bat.

Themyscira turned into the Tartarus Pits governed by Wonder Woman, and Gemworld became part of the new Hell. Mexico is replaced by Skartaris. The Rock of Eternity fell into Fawcett City, freeing the Seven Deadly Enemies of Man. Bathomet gave Aquaman control of Earth's ocean and the mechanical Black Fleet. Afterward, Lex hired Lobo to help him rescue the Legion of Doom.

=== Trinity Crisis ===
Superman, Batman, and Wonder Woman travel back to the three great Crises to stop Perpetua's manipulation. On the way, they encounter Barbatos, who taunts them for needing a Crisis to mend their failures. The trinity rejects their idea and continues on: Batman visits the original Crisis, Wonder Woman visits the Infinite Crisis, and Superman visits the Final Crisis. However, they are confronted by a victorious Anti-Monitor, Superboy-Prime, and Darkseid, respectively. Superboy taunts Wonder Woman, claiming that Perpetua has already changed the outcome of these events.

=== "Doom Metal Part 1" ===
Nightwing, along with a band of allies, including Hawkgirl and a reluctant Detective Chimp, is tasked by Lex Luthor to rescue the Legion of Doom.

=== Speed Metal ===
Barry, Wally, and Jay team up with Kid Flash and the rest of the Flash family to outrun the Darkest Knight and his army of Dark Multiverse Flashes in order to reach the Mobius Chair.

=== Multiverse's End ===
The Green Lantern Corps and the Justice Incarnate unite against the remaining Earths that have sworn loyalty to Perpetua: Earth-3, Earth-10, Earth-29, Earth-43, and Earth-50. Meanwhile, John Stewart tries to convince a reluctant Owlman to betray Perpetua and rise against the destruction of the Multiverse. He does so and uses a special gun made on Qward to kill Ultraman and Superwoman.

=== Issue #4 ===
Superman, Batman, and Wonder Woman are trapped in Dark versions of the original Crisis Trilogy, where the main villains have won. Across Gotham, the Flash family burn up the Speed Force to outpace the Darkest Knight. Wally contacts Jarro, who is trying to stop Harley Quinn from killing the Robin King after he murdered Hex. Wonder Woman learns how Superboy-Prime killed Alexander Luthor Jr. and holds her responsible. Superboy-Prime prepares to direct all Crisis energy into Darkest Knight. Wonder Woman convinces Superboy-Prime to reconsider, and he shatters the Crisis worlds, saving Batman and Superman, while also directing the energy to Wally. However, their plan fails, as Darkest Knight has rigged the Mobius Chair to always direct the power to himself.

=== "Doom Metal Part 2" ===
Starfire and Cyborg are fresh from their return to Earth and unite with Nightwing's team, where they come face-to-face with a valley of Starros. Meanwhile, the Martian Manhunter matches wits with the Dark Knight equivalent of himself called the Mindhunter.

=== "Doom Metal Part 3" ===
Lex Luthor and Nightwing help the others escape the valley, which is revealed to be a giant Starro. Lex constructs a vessel,, which he names after Lana Lang, to continue the journey to Brimstone Bay. However, Detective Chimp is disheartened by the whole experience, and Hawkgirl is more prioritized with saving Martian Manhunter.

=== Robin King ===
The Robin King recounts how the Batman Who Laughs recruited him into his Robin army. He is confronted by the Red Tornado, Animal Man, and Blue Beetle, but he kills all three. Meanwhile, Signal along with Spoiler, Orphan, and Red Robin battle against Quietus, a Dark Knight that is a fusion of Batman, Ra's al Ghul, and Duke Thomas.

=== Rise of the New God ===
Chronicler views the DC Universe through the eyes of Psycho-Pirate and Vril Dox while resurrecting the New God Metron. After Multiverse's End, John Stewart considers recruiting more members into the Green Lantern Corps.

=== "Doom Metal Part 4" ===
Perpetua's Omega Knight prepares to annihilate Nightwing's team when Detective Chimp comes to the rescue. Simultaneously, Hawkgirl saves Martian Manhunter from the Mindhunter. Regrouped, the team worked together to both distract the Omega Knight and destroy the throne tower holding the Legion of Doom captive.

=== Infinite Hour Exxxtreme! ===
Lobo narrates how Lex Luthor hired him to receive the Death Metal while on the run from a Batman/Lobo mashup known as The Batman Who Frags.

=== "Doom Metal Part 5" ===
The crew frees the Legion of Doom and defeats the Omega Knight. Soon after, they join the other heroes in their fight against the Darkest Knight.

=== Issue #5 ===
Now with god-like powers, the Darkest Knight orders Castle Bat, which has turned into a colossal Batman, to attack the heroes. Castle Bat gains the upper hand before it is shot down by the Hall of Doom, piloted by Lex Luthor. Meanwhile, the Darkest Knight and Perpetua battle as the latter begins her attack on Earth-49. Luthor reveals that he is making a machine that allows them to peer into the heart of reality. Using this machine, they can obtain the Anti-Crisis energy needed to fight the Darkest Knight. Batman reveals that he has been using the Black Lantern ring because he has already died, and Superman knows that there is no stopping his transformation into Darkseid.

While Wonder Woman leads an army of cloned Lobos into the Rock of Eternity, Superman frees several villains and recruits the remaining Supermen, Lantern Corps, and Black Adam to destabilize Prime Earth and stop the Darkest Knight from siphoning any more Crisis energy. Weakened, the Darkest Knight is unable to free himself from Perpetua. As a result, he deploys his evil Earths to kill the united army of heroes and villains. Batman uses the Black Lantern Ring to revive several deceased heroes, including Ultraman and Johnny Quick.

=== The Multiverse Who Laughs ===
The Robin King tells stories in the New Dark Multiverse to the Groblins:

- Zsasz in "Feeding the Beast" -
- The Super-Pets in "The Super-Threats" -
- Green Arrow and Green Lantern in "Hard-Traveled" -
- Steel in "The Fear Index" -

=== The Last Stories of the DC Universe ===
The heroes of the DC Universe spend their last moments together before they prepare for their final battle against The Batman Who Laughs and his new Dark Multiverse:

- The Titans in "Together Pt. 1" -
- Green Lantern in "Last Knights" -
- Wonder Woman in "The Question" -
- Green Arrow and Black Canary in "Dust of a Distant Storm" -
- Aquaman in "Whale Fall" -
- The Bat-Family in "We Fight for Love" -
- Superman in "Man of Tomorrow" -
- The Titans in "Together Pt. 2" -

=== Issue #6 ===
Earth begins a large battle with the Darkest Knight's "Last 52" Earths. Batman uses his Black Lantern Ring to get the Batman Who Laughs' corpse to fight alongside them. Elsewhere, Perpetua and the Darkest Knight continue fighting, and Perpetua tells the Darkest Knight that she is protecting the Multiverse from her own kind. The Darkest Knight traps Perpetua in the fragments of the Source Wall and kills her, realigning Prime Earth and continuing to absorb Crisis Energy. He revives members of the Dark Knights and deploys them against Earth. On Earth, Wonder Woman falls into the World Forge and is confronted by Darkseid and the baby Anti-Monitor. Diana dips her Lasso of Truth into the World Forge, realizing that it is needed to create Luthor's machine. A golden-clad Wonder Woman erupts from the ground and confronts the Darkest Knight.

=== The Secret Origin ===
Remembering his past with his beloved Laurie, his run-ins with the Superman Family, and his changing throughout the Crisis, Superboy-Prime takes his anger out on the Darkest Knight. The Darkest Knight offers to bring back Superboy-Prime's Earth, but is felled by a powerful onslaught of punches. The resulting explosion kills Superboy-Prime, who wakes up back in his world, where he is reading about this very story. Laurie visits him, and they go for a walk. Superboy-Prime saves a kid from getting hit by a car, revealing he still has his powers.

=== The Last 52: War of the Multiverses ===
The final battle rages on:

- Fight - Wonder Woman faces off against the Darkest Knight.
- First & Last Men - The Superman Family and their enemies battle with the "Superiors of the Ancient House of El" (consisting of the Last Sun, the Saint, the Savior, and the Shepherd).
- The Batmen Who Laugh - Batman finds himself under attack by the corpse of the Batman Who Laughs.
- Unstable Atoms - Ryan Choi overcomes his own shortcomings to help Mister Terrific and Will Magnus remake the Metal Men.
- No More Superheroes - Lois Lane comes face-to-face her own dark counterpart.
- Falling Through the Cracks - Raven saves the Teen Titans from her own evil counterpart.
- Apicus - The Penguin undergoes a hideous transformation.
- Armageddon Blues - Two John Constantines have one last drink before the end.
- Reign of the Swamp King - Swamp Thing, Frankenstein, Anton Arcane, Brimstone, and Solomon Grundy battle the Swamp King.

=== Issue #7 ===
The golden Wonder Woman and Darkest Knight engage in a fight that spans time and space. She is brought to the birth of creation, where the Darkest Knight reveals that Perpetua's people (referred to as "the Hands") will erase the universe, killing half of her friends. She is given two choices: continue fighting and lose, or surrender to the Darkest Knight and use their combined power to kill the Hands. However, Wonder Woman strikes him, punching him forward through time and into the dying embers of Earth's sun.

The Hands arrive, and Wonder Woman imagines a young Universe. She shoves the Darkest Knight into the Death Sun, killing him. She awakens in a white void and meets one of the Hands in the form of her Golden Age counterpart. The Hand tells Wonder Woman that her actions have allowed them to rethink their methods and that the Multiverse will be completely restored without walls or boundaries. In exchange, Wonder is ascended to assist the Hands to stop any looming threat.

On Earth, the Hall of Justice holds a large celebration featuring every hero and villain who helped defeat the Darkest Knight. Barry reveals to Wally "the Totality", a shield protecting the world from future threats. Lex Luthor refers to the new Multiverse as the "Omniverse", an Infinite Frontier of possibilities. Prime Earth is no longer the center of the Multiverse, as it is one of two sources of energy in the Multiverse, the other being the Absolute Universe. In 1941, Sgt. Rock finishes writing his experience in Carter Hall's journal as he leads the Justice Society of America into battle.

== Titles involved ==
=== Prelude issues ===
Title / Issue	Writer(s)	Artist(s)	Colorist(s)	Note
Flash Forward #1–6	Scott Lobdell	Brett Booth; Norm Rapmund	Luis Guerrero	Heroes in Crisis storyline
Justice League (vol. 4) #29–39	Scott Snyder; James Tynion IV	Bruno Redondo; Jorge Jiménez; Howard Porter; Daniel Sampere; Juan Albarran; Francis Manapul	Hi-Fi; Alejandro Sanchez	"Justice/Doom War" storyline
Year of the Villain: Hell Arisen #1–4	James Tynion IV	Steve Epting; Javi Fernandez	Nick Filardi	Year of the Villain storyline

=== Main issues ===
Ch.	Title / Issue	Writer(s)	Artist(s)	Colorist(s)	Note	Publication date	Critic rating	Critic reviews	Ref.
1	Dark Nights: Death Metal #1	Scott Snyder	Greg Capullo; Jonathan Glapion	FCO Plascencia	—N/a	June 17, 2020	9.2/10	26	
2	Dark Nights: Death Metal #2	Scott Snyder	Greg Capullo; Jonathan Glapion	FCO Plascencia	—N/a	July 15, 2020	8.6/10	19	
3	Dark Nights: Death Metal – Legends of the Dark Knights	Scott Snyder; James Tynion IV; Joshua Williamson; Peter J. Tomasi; Marguerite Bennett; Frank Tieri; Daniel Warren Johnson; Garth Ennis	Tony S. Daniel; Riley Rossmo; Jamal Igle; Francesco Francavilla; Daniel Warren Johnson; Joëlle Jones	Marcelo Maiolo; Ivan Plascencia; Chris Sotomayor; Francesco Francavilla; Mike Spicer; Jordie Bellaire	—N/a	August 5, 2020	7.9/10	17	
4	Dark Nights: Death Metal #3	Scott Snyder	Greg Capullo; Jonathan Glapion	FCO Plascencia	—N/a	August 12, 2020	8.4/10	18	
5	Dark Nights: Death Metal Guidebook	Scott Snyder; James Tynion IV; Joshua Williamson; Chip Zdarsky; Becky Cloonan; Vita Ayala; Christopher Priest	Doug Mahnke; Jaime Mendoza; Khary Randolph; Becky Cloonan; Dan Panosian; Eduardo Risso	David Baron; Emilio Lopez; Tamra Bonvillain; Luis Guerrero	—N/a	August 19, 2020	8.4/10	11	
6	Dark Nights: Death Metal – Trinity Crisis	Scott Snyder	Francis Manapul	Ian Herring	—N/a	September 1, 2020	7.8/10	17	
7	Justice League (vol. 4) #53	Joshua Williamson	Xermanico	Romulo Fajardo Jr	"Doom Metal" storyline	September 1, 2020	7.9/10	13	
8	Dark Nights: Death Metal – Speed Metal	Joshua Williamson	Eddy Barrows; Eber Ferreira	Adriano Lucas	—N/a	September 22, 2020	8.6/10	17	
9	Dark Nights: Death Metal – Multiverse's End	James Tynion IV	Juan Gedeon	Mike Spicer	—N/a	September 29, 2020	7.5/10	15	
10	Dark Nights: Death Metal #4	Scott Snyder	Greg Capullo; Jonathan Glapion	FCO Plascencia	—N/a	October 14, 2020	8.2/10	21	
11	Justice League (vol. 4) #54	Joshua Williamson	Xermanico	Romulo Fajardo Jr	"Doom Metal" storyline	October 7, 2020	7.8/10	15	
12	Justice League (vol. 4) #55	Joshua Williamson	Robson Rocha; Daniel Henriques	Romulo Fajardo Jr	"Doom Metal" storyline	October 20, 2020	7.6/10	13	
13	Dark Nights: Death Metal – Robin King	Peter J. Tomasi; Tony Patrick	Riley Rossmo	Ivan Plascencia	—N/a	October 20, 2020	7.5/10	16	
14	Dark Nights: Death Metal – Rise of the New God	James Tynion IV	Jesus Merino; Vicente Cifuentes	Ulises Arreola	—N/a	October 27, 2020	6.7/10	13	
15	Justice League (vol. 4) #56	Joshua Williamson	Robson Rocha; Daniel Henriques	Romulo Fajardo Jr	"Doom Metal" storyline	November 3, 2020	8.2/10	12	
16	Dark Nights: Death Metal – Infinite Hour Exxxtreme!	Frank Tieri; Becky Cloonan; Sam Humphries	Tyler Kirkham; Rags Morales; Denys Cowan; Bill Sienkiewicz	Arif Prianto; Andrew Dalhouse; Chris Sotomayor	—N/a	November 10, 2020	8.1/10	17	
18	Justice League (vol. 4) #57	Joshua Williamson	Xermanico	Romulo Fajardo Jr	"Doom Metal" storyline	November 17, 2020	7.2/10	10	
17	Dark Nights: Death Metal #5	Scott Snyder	Greg Capullo; Jonathan Glapion	FCO Plascencia	—N/a	November 17, 2020	8.3/10	18	
19	Dark Nights: Death Metal – The Multiverse Who Laughs	Scott Snyder; James Tynion IV; Joshua Williamson; Patton Oswalt; Amanda Conner; Jimmy Palmiotti; Saladin Ahmed; Brandon Thomas	Juan Gedeon; Sanford Greene; Chad Hardin; Scott Eaton; Norm Rapmund; Tom Mandrake	Mike Spicer; David Baron; Enrica Eren Angiolini; Hi-Fi; Sian Mandrake	—N/a	November 24, 2020	7.0/10	12	
20	Dark Nights: Death Metal – The Last Stories of the DC Universe	Joshua Williamson; James Tynion IV; Scott Snyder; Jeff Lemire; Mariko Tamaki; Gail Simone; Christopher Sebela; Cecil Castellucci; Mark Waid	Travis Moore; Rafael Albuquerque; Daniel Sampere; Meghan Hetrick; Christopher Mooneyham; Mirka Andolfo; Francis Manapul	Tamra Bonvillain; Ivan Plascencia; Adriano Lucas; Marissa Louise; Enrica Eren Angiolini; Andrew Dalhouse; Francis Manapul	—N/a	December 8, 2020	8.7/10	17	
21	Dark Nights: Death Metal #6	Scott Snyder	Greg Capullo; Jonathan Glapion	FCO Plascencia	—N/a	December 15, 2020	8.1/10	19	
22	Dark Nights: Death Metal – The Secret Origin	Scott Snyder; Geoff Johns	Jerry Ordway; Francis Manapul; Ryan Benjamin; Richard Friend; Paul Pelletier; Norm Rapmund	Hi-Fi; Ian Herring; Rain Beredo; Adriano Lucas	—N/a	December 22, 2020	9.1/10	21	
23	Dark Nights: Death Metal – The Last 52: War of the Multiverses	Joshua Williamson; Scott Snyder; Magdalene Visaggio; James Tynion IV; Kyle Higgins; Regine Sawyer; Che Grayson; Marguerite Bennett; Matthew Rosenberg; Justin Jordan	Dexter Soy; Scott Koblish; Paul Pelletier; Norm Rapmund; Alex Maleev; Scott Kollins; Alitha Martinez; Mark Morales; Pop Mhan; Inaki Miranda; Rob Guillory; Mike Henderson	Veronica Gandini; Adriano Lucas; Matt Hollingsworth; John Kalisz; Emilio Lopez; Chris Sotomayor; Eva De La Cruz; Marissa Louise	—N/a	December 29, 2020	7.3/10	16	
24	Dark Nights: Death Metal #7	Scott Snyder	Greg Capullo; Jonathan Glapion	FCO Plascencia	—N/a	January 5, 2021	9.2/10	14	

== Soundtrack ==
The announcement trailer featured the song "Warship My Wreck" by Marilyn Manson, alongside an original song titled "Broken Dreams, Inc" by Rise Against. Other singles since released include Maria Brink and Andy Biersack's "Meet Me in the Fire", Chelsea Wolfe's "Diana", Denzel Curry and PlayThatBoiZay's "Bad Luck", Manchester Orchestra's "Never Ending", Health's "Anti-Life" featuring Chino Moreno, and Idles' "Sodium". The soundtrack was ranked number twenty on Revolver's list of the "25 Best Albums of 2021".

=== Sonic Metalverse ===
From September 2020 to February 2021, a 7-part motion comic based on Death Metal was streamed on DC's official YouTube account. Entitled Sonic Metalverse, it featured much of the aforementioned soundtrack, an original score by Tyler Bates, and dialogue performed by a full cast made up primarily of metal musicians. The actors included Andy Biersack as Batman, Chelsea Wolfe as Wonder Woman and David Hasselhoff as Superman.

== Critical reception ==
At the review aggregator website Comic Book Roundup, the central miniseries garnered a score of 8.5 out of 10 based on 143 reviews.

== Future ==
The aftermath of Dark Nights: Death Metal led to several titles:

- Generations: Shattered and Generations: Forged — Released in January and February 2021.
- Future State — Released between January and March 2021.
- Infinite Frontier — Released in March 2021.

== Collected editions ==
Title	Material collected	Published date	ISBN
Dark Nights: Death Metal	Dark Knights: Death Metal #1–7	April 2021	978-1779515117
Absolute Dark Nights: Death Metal	Dark Knights: Death Metal #1–7	June 2023	978-1779521569
Dark Nights: Death Metal – The Darkest Knight	Dark Nights: Death Metal – Legends of the Dark Knights #1, Dark Nights: Death Metal Guidebook #1, Dark Nights: Death Metal – Trinity Crisis #1, Dark Nights: Death Metal – Speed Metal #1 and Dark Nights: Death Metal – Multiverse's End #1	April 2021	978-1779507921
Dark Nights: Death Metal – War of the Multiverses	Dark Nights: Death Metal – Last Stories of the DC Universe #1 and Dark Nights: Death Metal – The Last 52: War of the Multiverses #1	May 2021	978-1779510068
Dark Nights: Death Metal: The Multiverse Who Laughs	Dark Nights: Death Metal – Robin King #1, Dark Nights: Death Metal – Rise of the New God #1, Dark Nights: Death Metal – Infinite Hour Exxxtreme! #1, Dark Nights: Death Metal – The Multiverse Who Laughs #1 and Dark Nights: Death Metal – The Secret Origin #1	May 2021	978-1779507938
Justice League: Death Metal	Justice League (vol. 4) #53–57	September 2021	978-1779511997
