= Heroes in Crisis =

2018-2019 DC Comics crossover event

- Cover of Heroes in Crisis #1 (September 26, 2018). Art by Clay Mann.

Publication information
- Publisher: DC Comics
- Format: Limited series
- Genre: Superhero
- Publication date: September 2018 – May 2019
- No. of issues: 9
- Main character(s): Batman; Booster Gold; Flash (Wally West); Harley Quinn; Superman; Wonder Woman

Creative team
- Written by: Tom King
- Penciller(s): Clay Mann; Mitch Gerads; Travis Moore; Lee Weeks; Jorge Fornés

Heroes in Crisis is an American comic book limited series published by DC Comics. It is written by Tom King and illustrated by Clay Mann. Heroes in Crisis follows the "Crisis" naming convention of prior DC crossovers, but is billed as a murder-mystery. The series was published between September 2018 and May 2019. The entire storyline received mixed reviews, with critics praising Mann's art but heavily criticizing King's pacing, the ending, and the treatment of Wally West.

== Publication history ==
Heroes in Crisis is a nine-issue limited series written by Tom King—who has worked on DC Vertigo titles, Batman, and Mister Miracle—and illustrated by Clay Mann. It was published by DC Comics; cover art was provided by Mann, J. G. Jones, Mark Brooks, and Francesco Mattina. The series follows the "Crisis" naming conventions of prior DC crossovers, but unlike most prior "Crisis" events, Heroes in Crisis did not focus on a cosmic threat. Instead, it expands on a concept King introduced in Batman, the Sanctuary rehabilitation center, which is based on veterans' crisis centers.

According to King, the idea for Heroes in Crisis was conceived in 2016 after he suffered from a panic attack and went to the hospital, and his grandmother (who raised him) died on the same day. King had to go through therapy, after which he decided to use what he learned in a DC comic. The homestead of the Sanctuary on the cover of Heroes in Crisis #1 is modeled after his grandmother's house as a tribute to her.

Heroes in Crisis primarily deals with the emotional cost of being a superhero and explores "what violence does to a society", a common theme in King's work. King, a former CIA counterterrorism officer, believed this was an important subject that needed to be discussed. King described this creative decision: "Comic books, throughout the whole history of the medium, have been reflective of history. In World War II, there were comics about fighting in World War II. In the seventies, the comics were about psychedelic escape. Today, our moment right now is a moment of violence and living with violence and our comics have to address that".

Rumors of a new DC event with the Crisis naming surfaced in May 2018. The rumors were quickly denied by DC Comics co-publisher Jim Lee, who tweeted: "Rumors of reboots are ridiculous. Just stop with the misinformation". DC later announced the series on June 12, after King made an appearance on Late Night with Seth Meyers. The first issue was released on September 26.

== Premise ==
Billed as a murder mystery, Heroes in Crisis chronicles the aftermath of a mass shooting in the Sanctuary rehabilitation center set up by Batman, Superman, and Wonder Woman. The Sanctuary is located in the middle of the United States, and was created as a means to help treat superheroes dealing with mental health issues from Earth-threatening events, such as post-traumatic stress disorder. The three are the protagonists of the story, alongside Harley Quinn and Booster Gold.

== Plot ==
"The Sanctuary" is a secret rehabilitation center for superheroes and reformed supervillains dealing with mental health issues. A horrible massacre kills nearly all its patients, including Arsenal, Blue Jay, Commander Steel, Hot Spot, Lagoon Boy, Gunfire, Red Devil, Gnarrk, Protector, the Tattooed Man, Wally West, and Poison Ivy. Booster Gold and Harley Quinn become prime suspects as they are the only survivors of the event. As neither of them remember how it happened, they both believe the other did it and attempt to kill each other.

Batman deduces one of the Sanctuary patients was responsible for the killings, and seeks to catch the mysterious figure dubbed "the Puddler". He cannot access the Sanctuary's A.I. program. When they try to track down Harley Quinn, she tricks Wonder Woman and threatens to break Batman's neck unless they allow her to escape.

While Booster consults Ted Kord about Wally's corpse, Harley consults Batgirl about chasing Booster. Lois Lane shares with her husband that she has been mysteriously receiving confessions of the murdered superheroes. She later reveals the Sanctuary's existence and its purpose. The revelation generates fear of superheroes among the masses. Superman admits the Sanctuary's existence in public, requesting that they not mistrust them, despite their issues. In response, most of the heroes and their loved ones berate and accuse them for allowing that massacre to happen.

Green Arrow and Donna Troy attend a funeral for Roy Harper, while Batman informs Jason Todd about Roy's death. The Flash and Iris West are devastated after Booster Gold tells them about Wally's death, but Wally's cousin Ace West is convinced he is still alive somewhere due to his ability to time travel.

While Batman investigates the murders, the Flash reluctantly helps him. Their investigation leads them to a facility where Bane makes experiments on a brainwashed Gotham Girl to revive her brother Henry Clover, Jr. (formerly known as Gotham). However, Gotham Girl loses control of her newly acquired powers to the point of nearly dying.

After Booster and Harley settle their differences, he reveals Wally's corpse is from five days in the future, which leads them to believe the real Wally is still alive. That theory was proven true, as the present-day Wally revives Ivy from her rose and apologizes to her for causing harm in the first place.

The truth is Wally caused the massacre by accident. Still grappling with the trauma related to having his family erased in the New 52, he convinced himself that he was alone in his grief and that the Sanctuary was created by the Justice League solely for him out of pity. Desperate to find out the truth about which other heroes were being treated by the Sanctuary, he somehow broke into its A.I. program to retrieve Sanctuary patient data entailing all of their collective trauma. This discovery overwhelmed Wally and caused him to lose control of the Speed Force, creating an energy blast that caused the deaths at the Sanctuary. In a desperate attempt to buy himself five days to fix his mistake, he altered the scene to make it look like either Booster or Harley committed the crime, making up the Puddler persona. Wally then records a tape confessing his crimes, as well as his secret identity, and sends it to Lois.

Booster, Harley, the Blue Beetle, and Batgirl arrive back at the Sanctuary, prepared to save Wally. Using their combined detective skills, they understand that he is the culprit, but also a victim. Harley is reunited with Poison Ivy, who tells her that she was regrown by the Green. Meanwhile, Wally is prepared to kill himself so that he can maintain a continuous loop in which he stages the murder scene so that he can expose the Sanctuary to Lois, and then kill himself again to restart the loop. Wally is afraid he will create another Flashpoint if he attempts to rescue those he killed. Booster suggests that he can close the time loop if they clone Wally's body in the far future and use that body for the crime scene rather than his real body. Wally agrees to the plan so that he can hold himself responsible for the manslaughter, find a way to make up for it, and eventually move on. In the end, Wally contemplates his fate while in the Justice League prison, determining that hope is not denying his pain, but carrying that pain with him as he keeps on running.

== Titles involved ==
Title	Issue(s)	Writer(s)	Artist(s)	Note
Main series
Heroes in Crisis	#1–9	Tom King	Clay Mann	—N/a
Tie-ins
Batman	#64–65	Joshua Williamson	Guillem March and Rafa Sandoval	"The Price" storyline
The Flash	#64–65	Joshua Williamson	Guillem March and Rafa Sandoval	"The Price" storyline

Other tie-ins are included in Batman and The Flash, with the addition of Green Arrow, Red Hood and the Outlaws and Titans.

== Critical reception ==
The entire crossover received mixed reviews, with critics heavily criticizing the ending and the treatment of Wally West, but mostly praising the artwork. According to Comic Book Roundup, the series received an average score of 6.9 out of 10 based on 301 reviews.

== Spin-off series and follow-ups ==
Following the release of Heroes in Crisis, two spin-off series follow the aftermath of former's events along with some issues of The Flash series that expanded upon the cause of the Sanctuary Massacre.

The first series titled Harley Quinn and Poison Ivy, written by Jody Houser with art by Adriana Melo, follows Harley and Ivy dealing with the aftermath caused by the Sanctuary massacre while coming to terms with each other. The series debuted for release on September 4, 2019 and concluded on February 12, 2020.

The second series titled Flash Forward, written by Scott Lobdell with art by Brett Booth and Norm Rapmund, follows Wally West attempting to find redemption while getting a second chance to become a hero. The series debuted for release on September 18, 2019 and concluded on February 12, 2020. An epilogue was to have been featured in the Generation series but due to the COVID-19 pandemic it was later available in the trade paperback of the Flash Forward series.

In The Flash #761, Reverse Flash (Eobard Thawne) was responsible for manipulating Wally West into hiding the evidence of the killed heroes at Sanctuary and blaming Harley Quinn and Booster Gold for it.

In The Flash 2021 Annual #1, it was also revealed to be Savitar that caused the massacre as a way to escape from the Speed Force.

In The Flash #795, it was revealed that the heroes had survived, and the following issue explained that the hero Gold Beetle had replaced all of the dead heroes with clones from the 31st century.

== Collected editions ==
Title	Material collected	Published date	ISBN
Heroes in Crisis	Heroes in Crisis #1-9	October 2019	978-1401291426
Heroes in Crisis: The Price and Other Stories	Batman #64-65, The Flash #64-65, The Flash Annual #2	October 2019	978-1401299644

== See also ==
- Identity Crisis
