= Young Animal =

Young Animal may refer to:

- Young Animal (DC Comics), an imprint of DC Comics, curated by writer Gerard Way and founded in 2016
- Young Animal (magazine), a Japanese manga magazine, published since 1992

== See also ==
- Young animal
