= Cecil Castellucci =

American-born Canadian writer and musician

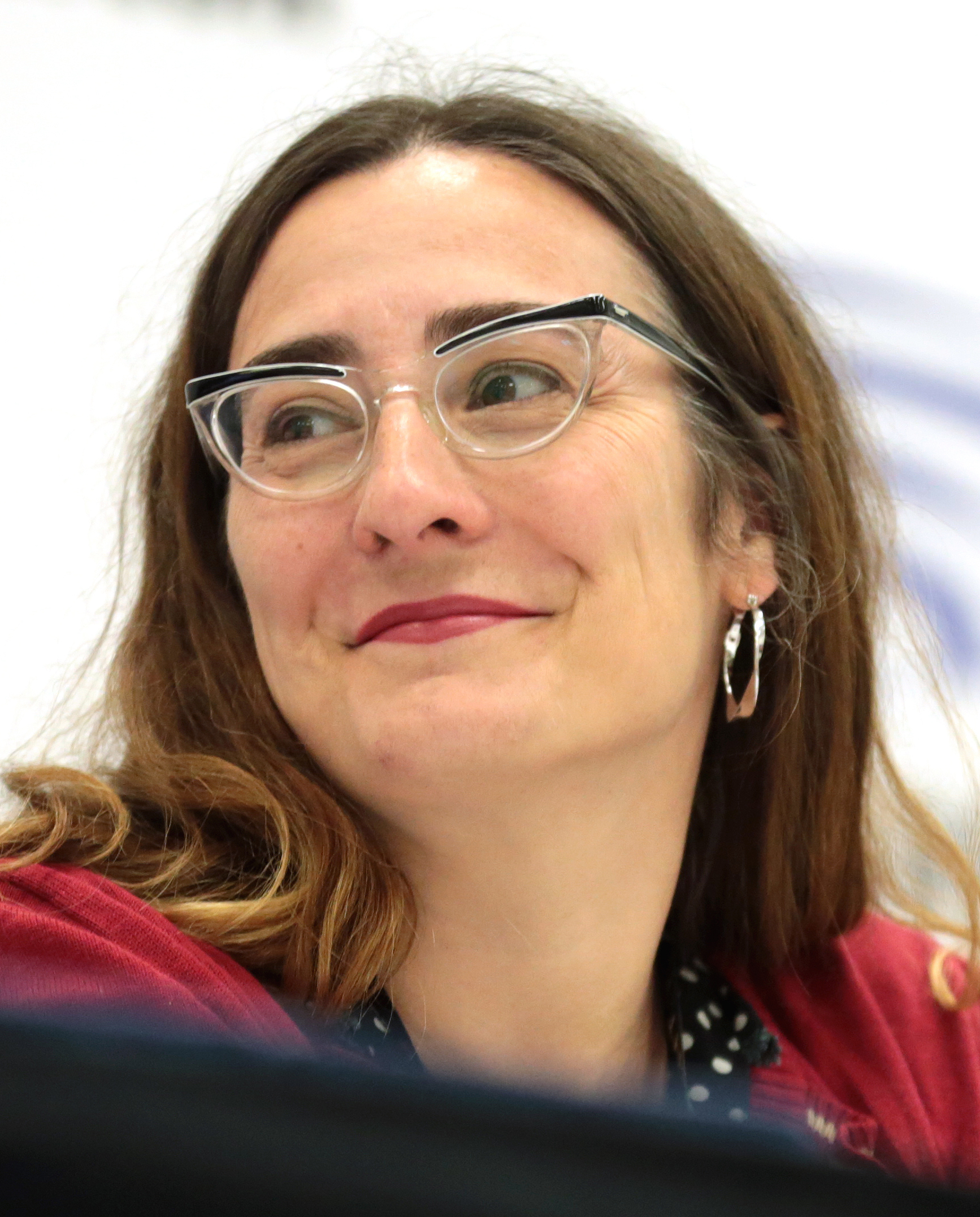
- Castellucci at WonderCon 2017

Background information
- Also known as: Cecil Seaskull
- Born: October 25, 1969 (age 57); New York City, NY, USA
- Genre: Indie rock
- Occupations: Novelist, singer, director
- Instrument: Vocals
- Years active: 2005–present (as writer)
- Website: www.misscecil.com

Cecil C. Castellucci (born October 25, 1969, in New York City), also known as Cecil Seaskull, is an American-born Canadian young adult novelist, indie rocker, and director. She currently lives in Montréal, Canada.

== Biography ==
Castellucci grew up in New York City where she attended the Laguardia High School of the Performing Arts. She later studied theatre in Paris at the École Florent. She attended Concordia University in Montreal and received a B.F.A. in Film Production.

In Montreal, she embarked on her music career as part of Bite, which was then the only all-female indie band in Montreal. When she was kicked out of Bite, she formed Nerdy Girl with Gordon Hashimoto. When Hashimoto left, she joined with Ron Woo, Gabe Levine, and Kim Temple to continue the band. After recording their only album Twist Her, Levine and Temple left the group, and Jessica Moss and Eric Craven took their places. She later moved to Los Angeles after Nerdy Girl broke up for good, and she recorded solo under her performing name, Cecil Seaskull.

In 2001 she co-founded the experimental Alpha 60 Film Collective with Neil Matsumoto and Nicholas McCarthy.

Castellucci's first novel, Boy Proof, was published in 2005.

Castellucci's 2013 short story "We Have Always Lived on Mars" was to be adapted into John Krasinski's film, Life on Mars, which is currently in development.

Castellucci is a Star Trek fan, with her favorite series being Star Trek: Deep Space Nine. Her favourite character is Dax.

== Novels ==
Castellucci's first novels were published by Candlewick Press. Her novels were also published by Scholastic Press, DC Comics and Roaring Brook Press.

Boy Proof is a 2005 novel about a girl in Los Angeles named Victoria Jurgen, who insists on being called "Egg" after a character in her favorite movie, fictional science fiction film Terminal Earth. Her mother is a washed-up actress and her father is special-effects designer. She is a card-carrying geek and considers herself "boy proof", and proud of it. However, her outlook on life is challenged when a boy named Max Carter comes to her school and she finds herself reluctantly drawn to him. It was named to the 2006 Best Books for Young Adults list by the Young Adult Library Services Association (YALSA) of the American Library Association (ALA) as well as to the Quick Picks for Reluctant Young Adult Readers list (also by YALSA).

Castellucci's 2006 novel The Queen of Cool centers on Libby Brin, one of the most popular girls in her school, whose life revolves around parties and boys. Deciding one day that she is bored with her glamorous lifestyle, she signs up for an internship at the local zoo, where she meets up with Tina, a dwarf with a huge personality, and a boy named Sheldon, which give her cause to question her priorities. As she spends more time with unpopular people, she realizes that they are actually good friends and that she has more fun with them than with her regular friends.

The 2007 novel Beige focuses on Katy, a French-Canadian girl forced to spend a summer with her estranged father, Beau "The Rat" Ratner, member of Los Angeles's most infamous punk band-that-never-made-it, Suck. Suck is about to come off its hiatus, and the Rat hopes he can use the band as an opportunity to bond with his daughter, a decision made difficult by her dislike of music.

The 2010 novel Rose Sees Red, set in New York in the 1980s, and centers on two ballet dancers (American and Russian, respectively), whose friendship transcends cultural and political differences.

In the 2011 picture book Grandma's Gloves, a young girl and her grandmother bond over gardening. A story about a child who loses a beloved grandparent and finds comfort in carrying on the activities they shared. It won the California Book Award Gold Medal for Juvenile category.

In the 2011 novel First Day on Earth, a man named Mal thinks he has been abducted by aliens and starts going to an alien abduction support group where he meets Hooper, who may or may not be a traveler from another world.

The Year of the Beasts (2012), a hybrid of prose and comics, with the latter illustrated by Nate Powell. The story of two sisters spending summer together is juxtaposed with a comics story of a girl who wakes up as a Medusa.

Odd Duck (2013) illustrated by Sara Varon is about two ducks who form a friendship despite both being odd.

The young adult novel Tin Star, about a girl abandoned on an alien space station, was published in February 2014. Stone in the Sky, a sequel, was published by Roaring Brook Press in 2015.

Moving Target: A Princess Leia Adventure, part of the Star Wars: Journey to Star Wars - The Force Awakens series, was published in September 2015.

== Comics ==
=== The P.L.A.I.N. Janes (2007) and Janes in Love (2008) ===
Castellucci wrote the inaugural graphic novel for DC Comics's Minx imprint, which targets the YA audience. it was illustrated by Jim Rugg. A longtime comic book fan (who had invited Batman to her fourth birthday party), Cecil accepted the offer when contacted by Group Editor Shelly Bond. The story follows Jane who moves to the suburbs after a terrorist attack in her hometown of Metro City, then forms P.L.A.I.N. (People Loving Art In Neighborhoods). At school, she rejects the popular girls, and instead finds her "tribe" with three other girls named Jayne (aka Brain Jane), Jane (Theater Jane), and Polly Jane (Sporty Jane). A Canadian citizen, Castellucci won the Joe Shuster Award in the category of "Outstanding Canadian Comic Book Writer" for Janes. Janes in Love, a sequel, was released in 2008. with Rugg again serving as artist. Here, P.L.A.I.N become entangled in affairs of the heart (both their own and others), and procure a spot in Metro City Museum of Modern Art Contest.

=== Shade, the Changing Girl ===
In October 2016, DC's new imprint Young Animal debuted. One of its initial titles was Shade, The Changing Girl, written by Castellucci, in which the previously-established character Shade is a female high school student. The creative team behind this new version also includes artist Marley Zarcone. After 12 issues and the "Milk Wars" tie-in Shade The Changing Girl/Wonder Woman Special (written with Mirka Andolfo), the series was relaunched as the six-issue Shade, the Changing Woman.

=== Other comics work ===
The graphic novel Soupy Leaves Home, about a train-hopping runaway in 1932, was published by Dark Horse Comics in April 2017. Between 2019 and 2020, she has written graphic novel adaptations of Disney animated films including Snow White and the Seven Dwarfs, The Little Mermaid, and Frozen.

== Music ==
=== Nerdy Girl ===
==== Nerdy Girl 10" EP (1994) ====
Released by No Life Records

1. Do You Like Me?
2. Glad To Know
3. Roof of Wilson
4. Hate Me
5. Nerdy Girl
6. Song 7

==== New Jersey 7" single (1995) ====
Released by RightWide Records

3 songs, including a cover of The Beatles' She Said She Said, and "After Having Cried".

==== Dime Store Hussy 7" single (1996) ====
Released by No Life Records.

1. Scream
2. 18 Foot Yacht
3. Perhaps

==== Twist Her (1997) ====
Released by No Life Records. Available on iTunes store.

1. Casa Nova
2. Hate Me
3. Georgiana
4. Iceman (Murder on the Rue Morgue)
5. Anne Elliot
6. Cast Off
7. Single Bed
8. Weed
9. Do You Like Me
10. Wicked
11. 3 Wishes
12. Judy
13. Aranova

=== Cecil Seaskull ===
==== Whoever (1998) ====
Released by Teenage USA Recordings. Available on iTunes store.

1. True Love
2. 2E
3. La Song (feat. Rufus Wainwright)
4. Toutes ces filles
5. Beautiful Everything
6. Fairfax & Melrose
7. Cheap
8. The Bruise
9. Dim
10. Ridiculous
11. What's Wrong?
12. Sweet Girl

==== For Lovers and Rats (unreleased) ====
Contains tracks "Ode to a Boy with a Girlfriend", "Liquor and Cigarettes", and "Whisper This to Me" (the latter two are available streaming from her MySpace page).

==== Other songs ====
- "My Chores" for Canadian Music Week 1997, on the compilation album Northern Exposure. It is also available streaming on her MySpace page.
- "Take Me" on indie compilation album Try for Summer, Plan for Fall, released in 1999.
- Also available on her MySpace page is a live cover version of The Muppets' "Movin' Right Along".

=== Les Aventures de Madame Merveille ===
In 2010 Castellucci was commissioned by ECM+ in Montreal along with composer André Ristic to write a libretto for an opera called Les Aventures de Madame Merveille. The live comic book opera featured art by Michael Cho, Pascal Girard, Scott K Hepburn and Cameron Stewart. It premiered May 6, 2010, and was remounted in Fall 2011.

== Films ==
Starwoids is a 2001 documentary about Star Wars camped out in front of Grauman's Chinese Theatre for six weeks in order to buy tickets for Star Wars: Episode I – The Phantom Menace. The group included Catellucci. She also appears in the special features on the Special Edition DVD, released in 2005.

Via Alpha 60, Castellucci made this ensemble film based on the actors' responses to a questionnaire. It premiered at the Alternative Screen series at the Egyptian Theatre in Los Angeles.

== Bibliography ==
=== Novels ===
- Boyproof, 2005, Penguin Random House
- Star Wars: Moving Target
- Don't Cosplay with My Heart, 2018, Scholastic Press

=== Short fiction ===
- "Always the Same. Till it is Not". Apex Magazine
- "Brother. Prince. Snake". Tor.com
- "The Marker". After, edited by Ellen Datlow and Terri Windling.
- "Best Friends Forever". Teeth, edited by Ellen Datlow and Terri Windling.
- "Wet Teeth". The Eternal Kiss: 13 Vampire Tales of Blood and Desire, edited by Trisha Telep.
- "The Sound of Useless Wings". Tor.com
- "Once You're a Jedi, You're a Jedi All the Way". Geektastic (with Holly Black)

=== Other works ===
- Geektastic, co-edited with author Holly Black
- "My Fairy Godfathers". Girls Who Like Boys Who Like Boys.
- "Bad Reputation". First Kiss (Then Tell): A Collection of True Lip-Locked Moments, edited by Cylin Busby.

== Awards ==
- 2018 Eisner Award nomination for Best Short Story: "Ethel Byrne"
- 2018 Harvey Award nomination for Book of the Year: Shade the Changing Girl
- 2018 EGL (Excellence in Graphic Literature) Award nominations in three categories — Book of the Year, Best Middle Grade, Mosaic Award: Soupy Leaves Home
- 2018 Best Feminist Reads Amelia Bloomer Award: Soupy Leaves Home
