= Mother Panic =

- Textless variant cover of Mother Panic #8, art by Emanuela Lupacchino

Publication information
- Publisher: DC Comics (Young Animal)
- First appearance: DC's Young Animal Ashcan Edition (2016)
- Created by: Jody Houser; Tommy Lee Edwards; Gerard Way

In-story information
- Alter ego: Violet Paige
- Species: Human Cyborg
- Place of origin: Gotham City
- Partnerships: Batman
- Abilities: Cybernetic enhancement; Superhuman strength

Mother Panic, also known as Violet Paige, is a fictional vigilante appearing in American comic books published by DC Comics and its imprint Young Animal, focused on mature readers. The character was created by writers Jody Houser and Gerard Way and illustrator Tommy Lee Edwards, first appearing in an insert preview of her own series in DC's Young Animal Ashcan Edition (2016).

== Publication history ==
=== Creation ===
Young Animal is an imprint of DC Comics, designed to tell stories set within the DC Universe aimed specifically at mature readers. Mother Panic was the last of the imprint's four launch titles to release. The series and its title character, Violet Paige, was conceived by Young Animal curator Gerard Way and illustrator Tommy Lee Edwards, both of whom conceptualized the character's background. Jody Houser, the author of Valiant Comics' Faith, was asked by Young Animal editor Molly Mahan to write several sample pages featuring Mother Panic to see if she "could nail [her] voice". Houser, who had grown up reading Batman, was hired shortly after turning in her work and began to write the series. She expanded upon Way's and Edwards' concept to "flesh out" the main character and establish her within Gotham City and the Batman mythos.

Unlike the other Young Animal titles, which feature established DC characters such as the Doom Patrol, Mother Panic features an original character created for the series. Houser's vision of Paige was essentially that of an anti-Batman: unlike Batman, Paige's identity as a vigilante is "not entirely an act" and the character as a whole is "messed up". Houser hoped that the series would last for several years and that Paige will continue to evolve. She also wanted to explore aspects of Gotham not seen in other Batman-related comics, due to the mature themes of Mother Panic; for this reason, she excluded well-known adversaries such as the Penguin and Catwoman. The first several issues were illustrated by Edwards, followed by Shawn Crystal and John Paul Leon. Jim Krueger wrote a backup story called "Gotham Radio" for the series.

=== Print run ===
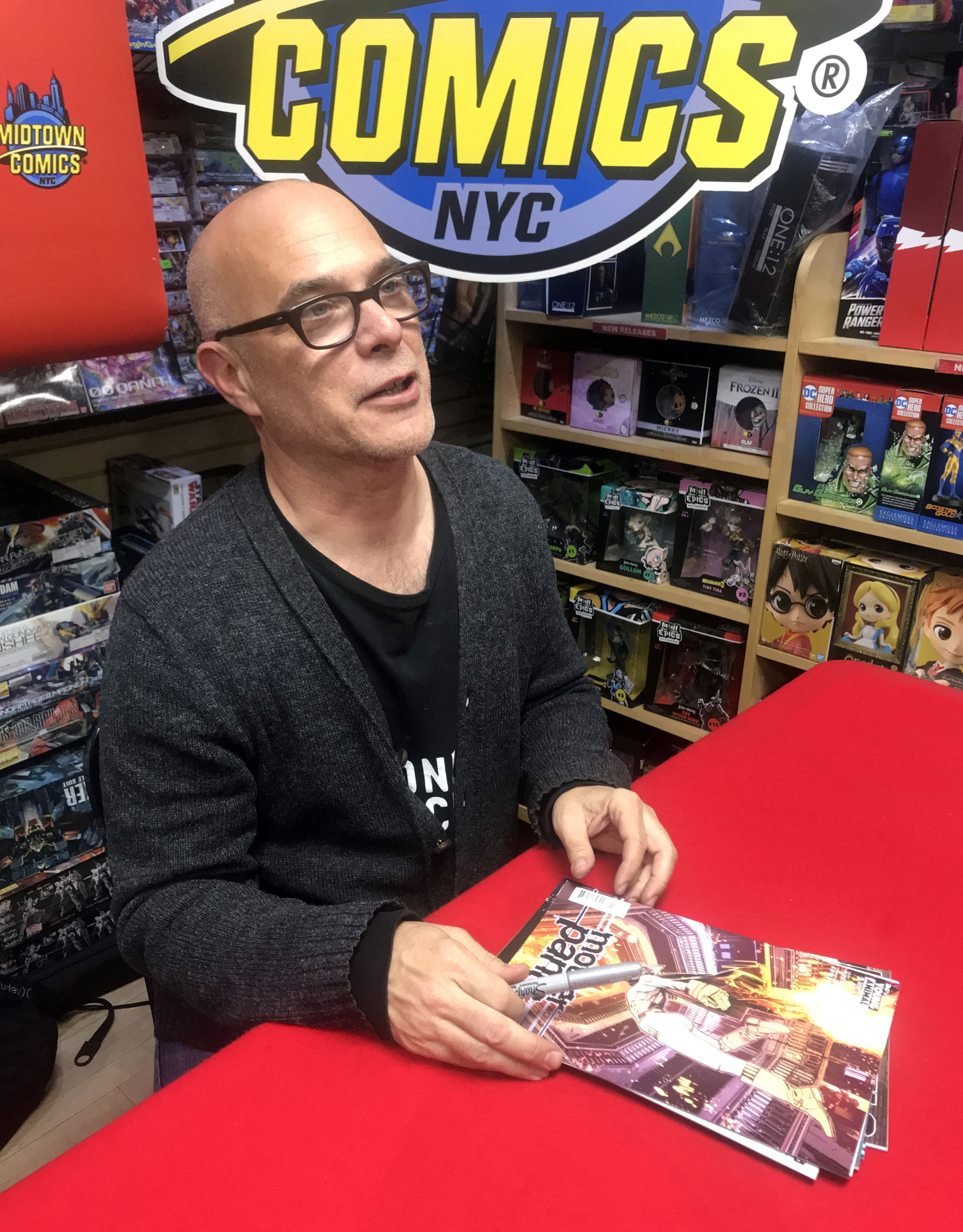
Writer Jim Krueger signing an issue of the series at Midtown Comics Grand Central in Manhattan.

The first issue of Mother Panic was published on November 9, 2016, cover-dated January 2017. The issue's story established Violet Paige and the series' setting in Gotham City, and featured a cameo by Batman and Batwoman.

All Young Animal titles (except Doom Patrol) were placed on hiatus after 12 issues. In early 2018, DC published the five-issue crossover story Milk Wars featuring both Young Animal characters (including Mother Panic) and more traditional DC Universe characters including the Justice League.

Mother Panic was relaunched in May 2018 with a new first issue and given the subtitle Gotham A.D. Unlike the first series, the second volume is set in a dystopian future where masked vigilantes are outlawed, Batman having abandoned Gotham. Gotham A.D. ended after six issues in August the same year.

== Fictional character biography ==
Violet Paige is a controversial, bisexual celebutante in Gotham City who was tortured and cybernetically-enhanced by a secret organisation in her youth, becoming the vigilante Mother Panic to get revenge.

== Powers and abilities ==
Due to being experimented on at the Gather House, Violet received cybernetic implants. These give her superhuman strength, capable of bending and breaking steel and leaving craters in concrete. These cybernetics are prone to malfunction, however, leaving Violet in extreme pain and unable to move until she can receive surgery.

Aside from her cybernetics, Violet is a capable fighter, being trained in martial arts and fencing.

== Collected editions ==
#	Title	Material collected	Pages	Publication date	ISBN
1	A Work in Progress	Mother Panic #1-6	176	June 20, 2017	ISBN 978-1-4012-7111-4
2	Under Her Skin	Mother Panic #7-12	168	February 27, 2018	ISBN 978-1-4012-8615-6
Gotham A.D.
1	Gotham A.D.	Mother Panic: Gotham A.D. #1-6	168	November 13, 2018	ISBN 978-1-4012-8100-7

== Other versions ==
In the possible future of Gotham A.D., Violet was thought to be dead after the Gather House burned down, but she was revealed to be held prisoner by the Collective.

In the possible future of Future State, the Mother Panic identity has been changed to Hunter Panic, being used by a woman named Jodi Edwards. Hunter Panic is a Mask Hunter in Gotham City for the Magistrate, who fights Harley Quinn and Punchline.

== Reception ==
The original Mother Panic series has been generally well-received. On the review aggregator ComicBookRoundUp, it holds an average rating on 7.8/10, based on 135 reviews. Reviewing the first issue for IGN, Jesse Schedeen called it the standout of the Young Animal lineup. He wrote that although it was set within Gotham City, Mother Panic felt distinctive from the Batman family and surreal.

Gotham A.D. was also well-received. It holds an average rating of 7.7/10 on ComicBookRoundUp, based on 45 reviews.
