= Orphan Black: Sarah =

First issue of the Orphan Black comic book series

- Orphan Black Issue 1, Variant Cover RI, Artwork by Nick Runge

Publication information
- Publisher: IDW Publishing
- Format: 32 pages, full color
- Genre: Science fiction
- Publication date: February 25, 2015
- Main character(s): Sarah Manning; Felix "Fee" Dawkins; Siobhan Sadler; Kira Manning; Paul Dierden; Arthur "Art" Bell; Elizabeth Childs

Creative team
- Created by: John Fawcett; Graeme Manson
- Written by: John Fawcett; Graeme Manson; Jody Houser
- Artist(s): Szymon Kudranski; Cat Staggs (covers A-H); Nick Runge (cover RI)
- Letterer: Neil Uyetake
- Colorist: Matt Lopes
- Editor: Denton J. Tipton

Orphan Black: Sarah is the first issue of the Orphan Black limited series based on the television series of the same name. The issue was written by show creators John Fawcett and Graeme Manson, with Jody Houser serving as co-writer; Szymon Kudranski provided the artwork for the issue. Issue #1 features the clone Sarah as she discovers the existence of several of her genetic identicals.

This first installment in the comic book miniseries was released on February 25, 2015 and received mixed critical reviews as some critics praised the artwork and fast-paced story, but condemned the redundancy of the plot. Nonetheless, the issue garnered a strong commercial performance, becoming the best-selling comic book of February 2015.

== Characters ==
Main

- Sarah Manning, the issue's main protagonist who is caught in an unusual conspiracy
- Felix Dawkins, Sarah's foster brother and confidant
- Siobhan "Mrs. S" Sadler, Sarah and Felix's foster mother
- Kira Manning, Sarah's biological daughter
- Paul Dierden, Beth's boyfriend
- Detective Arthur "Art" Bell, Beth's partner at the police force
- Elizabeth Childs, a woman who is aesthetically identical to Sarah and who was investigating the existence of several of her look-alikes before committing suicide

Minor

- Amelia, Sarah's South African birth mother who gave birth to her as part of an In vitro surrogacy
- Katja Obinger, a German woman who resembles Sarah and is seeking a cure for her upper-respiratory disease
- Victor "Vic" Schmidt, Sarah's ex-boyfriend who is also a drug dealer
- Helena, a trained Ukrainian sniper who is attempting to kill Beth and the other look-alikes, even though she is a look-alike herself
- Lieutenant Gavin Hardcastle, Beth's superior at the police force who is investigating Beth's murder of Maggie Chen
- Stephen Riggs, the director at Beth's bank who Sarah cons in order to withdraw $75,000 from Beth's bank account

== Plot ==
Wales, March 15, 1984

A surrogate mother, Amelia, is giving birth in a run-down medical facility. A cloaked person, a doctor, and a military soldier are seen assisting with the pregnancy. After the birth, the cloaked figure gives the doctor and the soldier "double" monetary compensation for the complications that occurred during birth.

Amelia is surprised to discover that she gave birth to two babies instead of the single one she was expecting. She announces her plans to separate the two children so that "they" do not find out about the double birth.

29 Years Later and an Ocean Away

Sarah Manning sits on a subway train, staring at a picture of her daughter, Kira. She wonders if Kira has forgotten about her in the time that she has been away.

Sarah steps off of the train and notices a woman crying and acting frantic on the train platform. Sarah approaches her; and, as she does so, the woman turns around. The two women look identical. Sarah is shocked as the woman steps in front of an oncoming train and is killed instantly. Sarah steals the woman's purse, which she left behind on the train platform, as she sees it as an opportunity to turn her life around.

Sarah meets with her foster brother, Felix, at a bar; and she recalls the scene she just witnessed at the train station.

Sarah remembers protecting Felix when the two were younger and still active in the foster system.

Sarah shows Felix the woman's driver's license as a way to prove the resemblance between the two women. Felix reveals that the woman's name was Elizabeth Childs. Sarah divulges her plan to visit Elizabeth's home.

Sarah and Felix as children stand in front of their final, permanent foster mother, Siobhan "Mrs. S" Sadler.

As Sarah walks to Beth's apartment, she is stopped by one of Beth's neighbors who asks her how Paul is doing. As Sarah speaks, the neighbor notices her harsh personality and is confused by her British accent. Sarah states that she has family in town visiting from London.

Sarah explores Beth's apartment and questions the reasons behind her suicide.

Beth cries in her bed, strokes a picture of her and her boyfriend, Paul, and confirms a bank deposit with someone over the phone.

Sarah discover's Beth's $75,000 bank deposit and concocts a plan to con the bank so that she can start a better life with Felix and Kira. She perfects her accent, colors her hair, and dresses up to visit the bank. While she is there, the director asks if she would like to access her safety deposit box. Sarah agrees and discovers birth certificates inside the box.

Sarah leaves Kira with Mrs. S and Felix as she is taken away by Victor "Vic" Schmidt, her ex-boyfriend.

As Sarah returns to Beth's apartment, Detective Arthur "Art" Bell convinces her to go with him to the police station.

Siobhan visits a teenage Sarah in jail, who was arrested after impersonating a duchess. Mrs. S is disappointed in her for getting caught.

Lieutenant Gavin Hardcastle escorts Sarah into a conference room where she is to recall the events that lead to the shooting death of a civilian woman named Margaret Chen. Sarah drinks hand soap, becomes sick, and is sent home.

Back at the flat, Sarah finds a video that Beth had recorded. Beth is concerned because she does not know who the enemy is and she no longer knows who she can trust. She states that she will never be able to trust Paul, or anyone else again. She reveals that there are already too many bodies and that she can't tell her "sisters" about the murders until she knows for sure.

A young Sarah is ambivalent about her place in Mrs. S's foster family. Siobhan attempts to reassure Sarah that she will not be sent away to another family again.

Earlier, Felix had positively identified the body found under the train as Sarah, so that Sarah could successfully assume Beth's identity and take over her life. Felix reveals that Vic wants a funeral, but Sarah is against it because she does not want Kira to think that her mother is dead.

Elizabeth Childs contemplates taking a handful of pills, but hides in her closet to weep instead.

Sarah showers and is in the process of changing her clothes when Paul arrives home from his business trip. He confronts "Beth" about the police hearing and starts to become suspicious of her. Sarah begins kissing Paul to distract him.

Beth and Paul practice shooting at a gun range, they run a marathon together, and they sleep together passionately in their bed. Later, Beth becomes suspicious of Paul, discovers letters that he has hidden, follows him as he sneaks around conspicuously, and the two are separated by an emotional barrier when they sleep.

Sarah cries as she witnesses the funeral that Vic has arranged for her. As she goes back to her car, she is followed by Katja Obinger, a red-haired woman who also shares a striking resemblance. Someone watches the two women from afar.

Katja gets into Sarah's car and recites a riddle in order to elicit a response from the woman she believes is Beth.

Beth is on the phone and devises the riddle as a way for each of the look-alikes to identify each other.

Sarah does not know how to respond to the riddle, and Katja realizes that she is not Beth. Katja is suddenly shot by a sniper through the car's windshield, and Sarah flees the scene as Beth's pink phone rings in the background.

Helena, yet another woman who looks like Sarah, leaves the grassy area on a motor cycle with a sniper rifle in tow. She vows to enact her revenge against Beth for murdering Maggie Chen.

== Reception ==
=== Critical reception ===
Tariq Kyle of Hypable gave the issue a positive review, indicating that "[e]ach frame, whether it looks like a still from the show or an entirely new scene, is beautifully drawn and manages to captivate the grungy essence of the show without being too messy." Kyle also praised the comic book's narrative style. Bleeding Cool also issued a positive review, commending the linear narrative structure and the "interesting use of time and flashbacks."

Jim Johnson of Comic Book Resources rated the issue a 3.0/5 and expressed mixed reviews. He criticized the issue for retelling events from the television pilot, often scene-for-scene and the lack of substantial new content with which the reader is wholly unfamiliar. Johnson indicated that the comic "will be appreciated most by those coming in with no past knowledge of the franchise." However, he complimented Houser's ability to transform Fawcett and Manson's story into an intimate character exploration. Johnson also expressed admiration of Kudranski's skillful depiction of the clones and of the supporting cast, adding "a dimension to the story not seen in the series." Max Delgado from Unleash the Fanboy rated the issue a 7.0/10, indicating praise for the art and premise, but condemning the significant lack of new material. He explained that the story is "a re-hashing of the pilot episode" and contains "relatively little new [material]." However, Delgado praised the dark and brooding artwork, signifying that through "a strange combination of photo-realism and dreamy fantasy, Kudranski captures the true grittiness of Orphan Black."

Eris Walsh of Comicosity rated the issue a 5.0/10 and expressed a negative review overall. She decried the re-telling of events from the first episode of the television series with few significant flashbacks. She described that for fans of the show, "the comic is largely boring," and added that for readers who have not seen the show, the comic book "runs the risk of being difficult to follow as information is glossed over with the assumption that the reader is familiar with what’s going on already." Walsh also criticized the art as being "pretty simple and in many ways unremarkable" with "a little too much reliance on computer graphics to fill in details." She summarized the entire comic book as "a little disappointing."

=== Commercial performance ===
Orphan Black was the best-selling comic book of February 2015, selling just under half a million units. The issue's February success has been attributed to its inclusion as an exclusive edition in Loot Crate's March box, as well as the wide variety of variant covers that were available for purchase.

== Variant covers ==
Orphan Black: Sarah offers eight different covers illustrated by Cat Staggs and an additional retailer incentive cover illustrated by Nick Runge.

The issue also offers a subscription variant cover which includes a photographic still of Tatiana Maslany and Jordan Gavaris as Sarah Manning and Felix Dawkins, respectively, instead of traditional artwork. Additional photographic cover variants can be found on the Loot crate exclusive, the Comicspro version, the Hot Topic version, and the Four Color Grail. The Gold Edition comic features a Phantom Variant, black and white still of Tatiana Maslany as Sarah Manning.

- Variant A by Cat Staggs features a close-up illustration of Sarah Manning against a blue background.
- Variant B by Cat Staggs features an illustration of Sarah and Felix in Felix's loft below his Rimbaud sign.
- Variant C by Cat Staggs offers an illustrated juxtaposition of Sarah and Beth facing away from one another with the hectic lights of the train station in the background.
- Variant D by Cat Staggs presents artwork of Sarah standing over Helena, with Helena's beheaded Katja barbie doll present in the foreground.
- Variant E by Cat Staggs depicts Sarah and Cosima, with Cosima's clone chart and a vial of blood present in the foreground.
- Variant F by Cat Staggs portrays Alison with a gun placed in her right hand and a glue gun placed in the other, with Sarah staring at her from behind.
- Variant G by Cat Staggs illustrates Katja's death and Sarah staring at the bullet hole in her windshield.
- Variant H by Cat Staggs features Rachel and Sarah, with Rachel turned around, staring at highrises through her office windows.
- Variant RI by Nick Runge presents illustrated representations of the television series' main clone and non-clone characters.

== Complete box set ==
While each individual issue costs $3.99, a Complete Box Set of all eight standard variant covers is also available for purchase for $29.99.

The issue and all variants were available for purchase through IDW Publishing online and in comic book stores starting February 25, 2015.
