= Milk Wars =

Comic book series by DC Comics

- Cover art of JLA/Doom Patrol Special #1 (March 2018), depicting Milkman Man, an alternate version of Superman, by Frank Quitely.
- Publisher: DC Comics
- Publication date: March – April 2018
Title(s)
JLA/Doom Patrol Special
Mother Panic/Batman Special
Shade, the Changing Girl/Wonder Woman Special
Cave Carson Has A Cybernetic Eye/Swamp Thing Special
Doom Patrol/JLA Special
- Main character(s): Doom Patrol; Justice League; Mother Panic; Cave Carson; Swamp Thing; Shade, the Changing Girl

Creative team
- Writer(s): Steve Orlando; Gerard Way; Jody Houser; Cecil Castellucci; John Rivera
- Artist(s): Frank Quitely; ACO; Sonny Liew; Ty Templeton; Mirka Andolfo; Langdon Foss; Dale Eaglesham

"Milk Wars" is a 2018 American comic book crossover published by DC Comics. It features the publisher's core characters—such as Batman, Superman, and Wonder Woman—crossing over with the characters of their imprint Young Animal.

== Production ==
According to Young Animal curator Gerard Way, the idea for a crossover between the main DC Comics line and Young Animal was proposed to him by DC. Way approved of the idea, saying he saw it as "a fun challenge, a way to reach mainstream readers, and hopefully a way to infect them with [Young Animal's] weirdness". Way, who considers Young Animal "a big experiment", was interested in reinventing DC's icons in ways that were fun. The inspiration for the series was how milk's wholesomeness could sometimes be a bad thing.

The creative teams for each issue were balanced between some individuals known for their work in Young Animal, and others known for their work in DC's main line. Each issue also features a backup story about the new character Eternity Girl by Magdalene Visaggio and Sonny Liew. Frank Quitely illustrated each issue's cover. JLA/Doom Patrol Special's cover references Grant Morrison's series All-Star Superman, which Quitely previously contributed to.

== Overview ==
Title	Writer(s)	Artist(s)	Synopsis	Date
JLA/Doom Patrol Special	Steve Orlando, Gerard Way, Magdalene Visaggio	ACO, Tamra Bonvillain, Sonny Liew	Retconn, an omnipotent corporation that steals stories and reconfigures them for new markets, meets with its latest client, Manga Khan. The Doom Patrol arrives in the 1950s-style utopia Happy Harbor, where they are shocked to discover that Superman has been twisted into Milkman Man and the Justice League of America has been twisted into the Community League of Rhode Island.	March 2018
Mother Panic/Batman Special	Jody Houser, Magdalene Visaggio	Ty Templeton, Keiran Smith, Sonny Liew	Mother Panic discovers that Gather House, the place that caused her to become a vigilante, has been restored. She goes in and discovers it is filled with boys wearing Robin costumes. To her shock, the boys are under the supervision of Batman, who Retconn has made a priest. Batman eventually reverts to his normal self and finds Cave Carson's eye, which contains a distress message.	April 2018
Shade, the Changing Girl/Wonder Woman Special	Cecil Castellucci, Magdalene Visaggio	Mirka Andolfo, Marissa Louise, Sonny Liew	Wonder Woman has been twisted into Wonder Wife; she believes she is the hero of housewives, and only does things for Steve Trevor. She is only able to feel one emotion at a time and her emotions are represented by several versions of Shade, who does not know what has happened. The Shade representing happiness finds Cave Carson's eye and through it sees what Wonder Woman should be like. She breaks through a wall in the "Hall of Moms", merging with the other emotions to become a singular Shade. Wonder Woman also comes to her senses and the two set out.	April 2018
Cave Carson Has A Cybernetic Eye/Swamp Thing Special	Jon Rivera, Magdalene Visaggio	Langdon Foss, Nick Filardi, Sonny Liew	Cave Carson goes out to lunch with his daughter Chloe and security chief Wild Dog. During lunch, Carson begins eating all the salad he can find before vomiting up Swamp Thing, who has discovered what Retconn is doing to the environment. Wild Dog and Swamp Thing fight drones while Carson and Chloe discover Retconn's plan to take all the heroes of the DC Universe and twist them into their puppets.	April 2018
Doom Patrol/JLA Special	Steve Orlando, Gerard Way	Dale Eaglesham, Nick Derington, Tamra Bonvillain, Marissa Louise	As Retconn attempts to sell the DC Universe to Manga Khan, the heroes attack. Khan's boss, Mr. Nebula, decides against the deal and Retconn attempts to trigger the Final Refresh Button, which will wipe out the continuity. Flex Mentallo uses his powers to stop Retconn and save reality, but causes some changes: Mother Panic is teleported to an alternate reality in which vigilantes have been outlawed, Cave Carson ventures into space, and Shade is reborn as an adult woman.	April 2018

== Reception ==
The series holds an average rating of 8.0 by 86 professional critics on the review aggregation website Comic Book Roundup.

== Collected edition ==
Title	Material collected	Published date	ISBN
DC/Young Animal: Milk Wars	JLA/Doom Patrol Special #1, Mother Panic/Batman Special #1, Shade, the Changing Girl/Wonder Woman Special #1, Cave Carson Has A Cybernetic Eye/Swamp Thing Special #1, Doom Patrol/JLA Special #1	June 2018	978-1401277338
