= Generations (DC Comics) =

2020–21 DC Comics event

- Generations: Shattered cover. Art by Ivan Reis and Joe Prado.

Publication information
- Publisher: DC Comics
- Genre: Superhero
- Publication date: September 2020 – February 2021
- Main characters: Batman; Sinestro; Kamandi; Booster Gold; Starfire; Doctor Light; Steel; Superboy; The DC Universe

Creative team
- Written by: Dan Jurgens; Andy Schmidt; Robert Venditti
- Penciller: Multiple
- Colorist: Hi-Fi

Generations is an event published by DC Comics. The event was originally announced as a limited comic book series that would have united all eras in the history of the DC Universe, and was scheduled to begin on Free Comic Book Day on May 2, 2020. However, following the exit of publisher Dan DiDio from DC and the effects of the COVID-19 pandemic on the comics industry, the series was delayed and intended plans changed. The event then gained a new form with the announcement of two one-shots titled Generations: Shattered and Generations: Forged. The event received generally positive reviews with critics praising the unique idea but criticizing the pacing.

== Publication history ==
=== Initial plan ===
Generations was originally planned as the event that would unite all eras in the history of the DC Universe, starting with Generation Zero, which was scheduled to release during Free Comic Book Day on May 2, 2020. However, following the exit of publisher Dan DiDio from DC Entertainment in February 2020, and effects of the COVID-19 pandemic on the comics industry, the series was delayed. Writer Scott Snyder stated the plans for Generations had become more "fluid", and in June 2020, Generation Zero was not part of DC's plans for the revised Free Comic Book Day. A story featured in Wonder Woman #750 was considered a prelude to the event in its original form.

=== Revised plan ===
The story "Generations: Fractured" that appeared in Detective Comics #1027 is considered the first chapter in the event's new form. In September 2020, DC announced the one-shot Generations: Shattered for release in January 2021. As well, DC Comics publisher and chief creative officer Jim Lee stated that the 5G initiative, which would have occurred at the end of the original plan for Generations, was no longer happening. He said: "We had a lot of great ideas that we were floating around. And rather than dumping it all in one month and renumbering the line and going for that really short term spike in sales, we just naturally gravitated to the story ideas and concepts we love and building them into the mythology, the ongoing mythology, in a very organic way". Writer/artist Dan Jurgens added the revised version of the event came about through "a very organic process with a natural evolution of ideas".

Generations: Shattered was originally teased as Generations: Future State in the Detective Comics #1027 story, suggesting a connection to the planned event "Future State", which was released in January and February 2021. While this was originally the plan, Generations no longer connects to "Future State", with Jurgens stating: "Originally, we were going to touch on what's coming with Future State. We're detouring from that a bit to focus more on our own story". Batman group editor Ben Abernathy also confirmed Generations was now its own story. Generations also picks up from the events seen at the end of Dark Nights: Death Metal. The characters featured in the event were selected "to reflect different periods of DC publishing history" and because they "made for a very interesting mix of personalities, backgrounds, powers, and capabilities". The Batman in the event is from 1939, to represent the Golden Age of Comic Books; Sinestro represents the Silver Age of Comic Books; Kamandi is a representation of DC Comics' 1970s publishing and a link to the Great Disaster future; Booster Gold, Starfire, and Doctor Light represent the 1980s; and Steel represents the 1990s.

== Plot ==
=== Original storyline ===
- Wonder Woman #750
- The Flash #750
- Flash Forward TPB

During the 1939 New York World's Fair, Wonder Woman saves President Franklin D. Roosevelt from terrorists which causes inspiration around everyone in the country including people like Alan Scott.

Following his incarceration for his role in the massacre on Sanctuary, (Note: As depicted in Heroes in Crisis.) Wally West is forcibly recruited by Tempus Fuginaut to restore the balance between the Light and Dark Multiverses. When Wally finds Metron's Mobius Chair, he also finds his children, Jai and Iris, trapped. Before sitting on the chair, he makes a deal with Tempus to save his children and return them to his wife Linda Park. Tempus agrees and Linda, Jai and Iris are reunited. Meanwhile, it is revealed that the Mobius Chair was upgraded with a portion of Doctor Manhattan's powers, which causes Wally to become a godlike persona of himself.

With Manhattan's powers, Wally begins investigating reality and finds out time and space are out of synchronicity, in spite of Manhattan restoring the universe. (Note: As depicted in Doomsday Clock.) During a brief conversation with Tempus, Wally decides to complete the restoration of the timeline by mending all realities in one. But as he attempts to do that, Wally is interrupted by the presence of The Batman Who Laughs who wants to obtain those new powers. Wally has no choice but to find the Batman Who Laughs first. (Note: As depicted in Dark Nights: Death Metal.)

=== Revised storyline ===
- Detective Comics #1027
- Generations: Shattered
- Generations: Forged

In Gotham City, Batman is searching for a gang of museum vandals led by Calendar Man. As a mysterious flash of light appears to break reality, Batman is transported back to 1939 and transformed into his Golden Age counterpart when he meets Kamandi, who was sent by Booster Gold to search for him.

In a distant future, a phenomenon causes reality to be erased, and Kamandi in being hunted by Man-Bats, blaming him for the event, until he is rescued by an elder Booster Gold, who is shot by the Man-Bats. Booster delivers Kamandi his gauntlet containing Booster's robot companion Skeets, causing Kamandi to travel through time, recruiting Batman (from the 1940s), Pre-Flashpoint versions Sinestro, Starfire, Doctor Light, Steel, and Superboy (recruited by mistake instead of Brainiac 5) and a younger Booster Gold. Together they face the Linear Men, who were brainwashed by Dominus, the mastermind behind the phenomenon. Once again, the timeline is disrupted and the heroes are marooned across several points of history.

While in a different dimension, Dominus changes his own history in where he neglected his loved ones before, and dispatches others taken from various timelines to find and deal with the scattered heroes. Starfire, Dr. Light, and Kamandi are on Krypton prior to its destruction, where they are attacked by General Zod. Kamandi flees while Starfire and Dr. Light are captured, but the pair are then rescued by Jor-El. Superboy and Steel are on prehistoric Thanagar where the two of them bond and talk about the future before they are attacked by Nemesis Kid and Eradicator. In the future, Sinestro is fighting against Ultra-Humanite and Booster Gold contends with Major Force. Dr. Light realizes her team is marooned in several points of history, and reassures Jor-El and his wife that their son will be a great hero. Kamandi is attacked by OMAC (Buddy Blank), Artemis, and Knockout when Starfire saves him and gives him a lecture on not abandoning teammates. Dr. Light absorbs Krypton's red sun to manipulate the time stream and orders everyone to go to the Vanishing Point. Superboy and Steel barely defeat Eradicator and Nemesis Boy and make it to the Vanishing Point, while young Booster Gold saves Batman and they meet up with Sinestro and his group.

The Heroes meet up at the Vanishing Point and realize that Dominus created an alternate timeline where he can still be with his family. Batman confronts Dominus and tries to reason with him but his children attack Batman. Batman is saved by his allies and they all weaken Dominus to the point where his family disappears. Enraged, Dominus nearly kills the heroes, but Steel realizes that if the heroes attack Dominus' chestplate he will be defeated. The heroes debate on killing him, but Steel realizes that if they destroy Dominus' source of power (a clock) then Dominus will live but he will be powerless. The heroes destroy the clock, allowing time to reset back to normal and all the heroes return to their respective timelines. When Matt Ryder takes Batman to his timeline, he reveals that the timeline is more like a Linearverse where characters age slower, which allows their legacy to live on forever.

== Titles involved ==
Title / Issue	Story	Writer(s)	Artist(s)	Colorist(s)	Release date	Critic rating	Critic reviews	Ref.
Original Storyline
Wonder Woman #750	"A Brave New World"	Scott Snyder	Bryan Hitch	Mike Spicer	January 22, 2020	8.8/10	19	
The Flash #750	"Generation Zero"	Scott Lobdell	Brett Booth	Luis Guerrero	March 4, 2020	8.3/10	12	
Flash Forward TPB	"Generation Zero"	Scott Lobdell	Brett Booth	Luis Guerrero	July 8, 2020	7.0/10	67	
Revised Storyline
Detective Comics #1027	"Generations: Fractured"	Dan Jurgens	Dan Jurgens; Kevin Nowlan	Hi-Fi	September 15, 2020	8.7/10	19	
Generations: Shattered		Dan Jurgens; Andy Schmidt; Robert Venditti	Oclair Albert; Doug Braithwaite; Bernard Chang; Scott Hanna; Klaus Janson; Dan Jurgens; Aaron Lopresti; Emanuela Lupacchino; Danny Miki; Rags Morales; Kevin Nowlan; Fernando Pasarin; Yanick Paquette; Paul Pelletier; Mike Perkins; Joe Prado; Ivan Reis; John Romita Jr. Matt Ryan; Wade von Grawbadger	Hi-Fi	January 5, 2021	8.0/10	15	
Generations: Forged		Dan Jurgens; Andy Schmidt; Robert Venditti	Bernard Chang; Andrew Currie; Colleen Doran; Bryan Hitch; Dan Jurgens; Kevin Nowlan; Paul Pelletier; Mike Perkins; Joe Prado; Norm Rapmund; Marco Santucci	Hi-Fi	February 23, 2021	7.2/10	12	

== Reception ==
The overall series received mixed reviews. According to Comic Book Roundup, the series received a score of 7.5 out of 10 based on 31 reviews.

== Collected edition ==
Title	Material collected	Published date	ISBN
Generations	Generations Shattered #1, Generations Forged #1, and material from Detective Comics #1027.	June 2021	978-1779510099
