= Orphan Black (comic book) =

Series of comic books

- Cover of Orphan Black Issue #1 Variant Cover A by Cat Staggs

Publication information
- Publisher: IDW Publishing
- Schedule: Monthly, Bi-Monthly, Tri-Monthly
- Format: Limited series
- Genre: Science fiction
- Publication date: February 2015
- No. of issues: 5 (series 1); 5 (series 2)

Creative team
- Created by: John Fawcett; Graeme Manson
- Written by: John Fawcett; Graeme Manson; Jody Houser (series 1); Heli Kennedy (series 2)
- Artist(s): Szymon Kudranski (series 1, issues 1–2); Cat Staggs (series 1, issues 3–4); Alan Quah (series 1, issues 3–5; series 2, issue 1); Wayne Nichols (series 1, issue 5; series 2, issues 2–5); Fico Ossio (series 2, issues 2–5)
- Letterer: Neil Uyetake
- Colorist(s): Matt Lopes (series 1, issues 1–2); Chris Fenoglio (series 1, issues 3–5; series 2, issues 1–3); Eelco Koper (series 1, issue 4); Andrew Elder (series 2, issue 3); Sebastian Cheng (series 2, issues 4–5)
- Editor(s): Denton J. Tipton (edits); Mackenzie Donaldson and Kerry Appleyard (series 2, story edits)

Orphan Black is a limited series of comic books based on the television series Orphan Black. The series is written by show creators John Fawcett and Graeme Manson, with Jody Houser serving as co-writer; Szymon Kudranski provides the artwork for issues #1 and #2, while Cat Staggs and Alan Quah shared art duties for issues #3-#5. The comic books are part of a limited series consisting of five issues, each focusing on the past and present life of a different clone.

== Publication history ==
There were four series of 'Orphan Black' comics planned. The first issue of the series was released on February 25, 2015. A new issue was released monthly until July 2015, when the final of the five contracted issues was released. The issues of the first series in order feature Sarah, Helena, Alison, Cosima and Rachel. The fourth and final series was cancelled before its release, but the first issue had already been printed and delivered to some comic shops.

== Plot ==
=== Series 1: The Clone Club ===
The first series provides background to each of the main clones in the television series and shows what the events of their lives before the series began.

==== Issue #1: Sarah ====
The plot of the first issue closely follows the storyline established in the television series' pilot episode and similarly focuses on Sarah Manning and her discovery of her numerous genetic identicals. Scenes from the episode are recounted in the comic book, intermixed with new scenes and flashbacks. The new material specific to the comic books includes flashback sequences to Sarah's childhood, additions to and extensions of scenes in the present storyline, and insight into Sarah's thoughts and feelings as she takes over the life of a dead woman who shares her exact external appearance.

==== Issue #2: Helena ====
The second issue of the series, released in March 2015, focuses on Helena's childhood as well as her adult actions and motivations that are presented in the first season of the television series.

=== Series 2: Helsinki ===
The second series follows Finnish clone Veera "MK" Suominen and shows the events leading up to the extermination of six European clones in September 2001. It is effectively a prequel to the introduction of MK in season 4 of the television series.

==== Issue #1: The Chaos Strategy ====
The first issue of the series was released in November 2015.

==== Issue #2: Code Duplication ====
The second issue of the series was released in December 2015.

==== Issue #3: Fail-Safe Redundancy ====
The third issue of the series was released in January 2016.

==== Issue #4: False Positive Error ====
The fourth issue of the series was released in February 2016.

==== Issue #5: Kill Switch ====
The fifth issue of the series was released in March 2016.

=== Series 3: Deviations ===
Deviations is an alternate take on the series, showing how events would have unfolded if the characters took different actions. There were six issues in this series.

=== Series 4: Crazy Science ===
Crazy Science would have taken place after the end of the fifth season of the TV series. It would have starred Cosima and Delphine traveling around the world to cure 274 Leda clones while also falling even more in love. However, the series was cancelled in June 2018 due to low orders from comic shops. Due to an early printing deadline, the first issue was still released in July.

== Tie-ins to the television series ==
The comic book miniseries was conceived as a way to convey information about the clones' pasts and childhoods without interrupting the fast pace of the television series. It is presented as an expanded universe that offers off-screen events not shown in the episodes. The comic books tie directly into the events of the show's first season in order to ground the comics into the already-established universe. The miniseries presents the audience with the opportunity to better understand the emotions, thoughts, and feelings that underlie the characters of the television series.
