= Beige (novel) =

Book by Cecil Castellucci

Beige is a young adult novel by Cecil Castellucci. It was published by Candlewick Press in 2007 and is Castellucci's third novel.

== Plot summary ==
Katy Ratner Berneir is a fourteen-year-old born and raised in Montreal, Canada. Both her parents had substance abuse issues but her mother conquered them first, so she is the person that raised her. Katy has never been apart from her mother and has barely spent any time with her father. Even though she was raised with her mother and is extremely close to her, she is not a very important character in the book. The protagonist finds out that she has to go and stay the whole summer with her dad. She is not happy. She begins to ask her dad questions about her mother and is actually surprised to hear some things that she never knew. She starts hanging out with Lake Suck, who is the daughter of her father's best friend. Lake is one of the key characters because she causes a lot of changes in Katy and helps her see life from a different perspective. She has a lot of issues with Lake because of their personality and background differences. Katy gets introduced to a person named Garth Skater. Katy thinks Garth is a girl but later finds out that he is a boy. Garth is a huge fan of Suck (her father's band) and is really nice to everybody. Leo is a boy that Katy has a huge crush on. She is eventually persuaded to try things out, even if she doesn't like them. She eventually starts liking Trixie (her father's girlfriend) and actually admires her.

== Characters ==
- Katy Ratner Berneir is the protagonist and main character. She is a fourteen-year-old girl from Montreal, Canada, and has a rocky relationship with her father. Her parents have a ten-year age difference. They both suffered from drug and alcohol addictions. Her mother got clean first so she grew up with her.
- Beau Ratner, better known as "The Rat", the drummer for the infamous band called Suck. He is the second main character. He is Katy's father. He struggled with drug and alcohol abuse for many years. Katy and her mother never considered him a "good father figure" due to his addictions, mainly because they all said he got banned from Canada for possession of cocaine. "Everybody sees him. The rat is six feet five inches tall and wears a tiny cowboy hat on his head. He's got a rolled up cigarette (I hope not a joint) hanging out of his mouth."
- Katy's mother is an ex-addict and abuser of drugs and alcohol, and has been since having Katy. Since leaving the punk scene in her younger days, she works now in the profession of archaeology and lives with Katy in Canada. She sends Katy to go to live with her father for the summer, while she's in Peru working. "It's like those Greek myths," she says, "where someone has to go to Hades and back to get the one that they love. I went to Hell and back and I found you."
- Lake Suck is one of the key characters who causes change in Katy. She is the fourteen-year-old daughter of The Rat's best friend and band member, Sam Suck. She is described as the type of girl that will do anything to achieve her goal. She is also described as bossy, demanding, and outgoing. It is emphasized that she has a high-pitched voice and is in love with music. "My name is Lake Suck and this is my manifesto. I swear to be myself. To think for myself. I will not be led by social conventions. I will make my own way through the world. I will live on my own terms without conforming to society's expectations of who they think I should be. I will be the visible minority. By being myself, I will help to save the world. I swear to always look, listen, learn, think, ask, act and think for myself."
- Trixie is The Rat's middle-aged girlfriend. She has a son named Auggie, who is assumed to be Katy's half brother. Being in the profession, Trixie taught Katy burlesque dances during her stay and has an expressive personality. "I've noticed that most people hide things about themselves. Not Trixie. It's not just her mermaids and love for burlesque that are on display; it's everything, including her feelings and thoughts. I don't think I've ever met anyone quite like Trixie. I kind of admire that."
- Garth is a fourteen-year-old skater and punk fan. According to Katy, his appearances resemble much like a girl without his skateboarding gear on. Garth has a crush on Lake and was the first boy to be Katy's friend. "No one here likes me. Except Garth. But Garth likes everyone, so that doesn't really count."
- Leo is a young lifeguard who had previous relation with Lake. According to Lake, Leo is a "player", and a "jerk". Katy develops a crush on him throughout the plot.
  - "Just because we hooked up at the party doesn't mean I like you"
  - "Let me tell you something about Leo, as your temporary friend. He's a player. He's a jerk. And he's an asshole"
  - "So yeah, I just needed him for the angst. For my songwriting. And then he got all attached. And when I started hanging with you, he tried to make me jealous by putting the moves on you."

== Reception ==
Beige received both bad and good reviews. School librarian and blogger Cindy Dobrez wrote, "Catellucci gives a fresh spin to the familiar exiled-teen plot by mixing details of the L.A. punk scene with memorable characters and witty dialogue. By the end of the story, Katy has lost some of her Beige ways, and the lessons she has learned will help her deal with a sudden change in her mother's plan." In a review for School Library Journal, Emily R. Brown wrote, "This book lacks the details — from teenage sign language to sci-fi trivia — that gave Castellucci's other books credibility."
