= DC's Young Animal =

DC Comics imprint (2016–2021)

Young Animal
- Parent company: DC Comics
- Founded: 2016; 10 years ago
- Defunct: 2021; 5 years ago
- Key people: Mark Doyle (executive editor); Jamie S. Rich (group editor); Gerard Way (curator)
- Publication types: Comic books
- Owner: Skydance Corporation

DC's Young Animal was a "pop-up" imprint of DC Comics started in 2016. It was developed in collaboration with Gerard Way, an American musician and comic book writer, author of The Umbrella Academy. Its main focus was to relaunch characters and settings from the DC Universe in stories for mature readers, done with a more experimental approach than DC's primary line of superhero comics. The line was overseen by Vertigo group editor Jamie S. Rich and executive editor Mark Doyle.

Gerard Way said that a shared theme of the Young Animal comics is "relationships between parents and children". Other themes he has cited are alienation, fame, change ("self-actualization and becoming something else"), as well as bullying, teenagers and drug use (in Shade, the Changing Girl), and eventually "a lot of personal stuff for me in Doom Patrol that deals with mature themes".

== History ==
The imprint launched in late 2016 with four ongoing series: Doom Patrol, Shade the Changing Girl, Cave Carson Has a Cybernetic Eye, and Mother Panic, followed in 2017 by a 6-issue limited series Bug! The Adventures of Forager. In the middle of 2018 was a five-part crossover involving members of the Justice League, which was called Milk Wars. Three of the series were then relaunched as Shade the Changing Woman, Cave Carson Has an Interstellar Eye, and Mother Panic: Gotham A.D., running for 6 issues under those names, along with the new title Eternity Girl, which also ran for 6 issues. The line was placed on hold in August 2018, with the 12th issue of the delayed Doom Patrol series going on sale the following October.

One of the "Young Animal" titles, Doom Patrol resumed in July 2019, and was joined by two new titles, Far Sector and Collapser.

== Titles ==
- Shade, the Changing Girl – by Cecil Castellucci and Marley Zarcone – is a continuation of the earlier Vertigo series Shade, the Changing Man. Here, an alien is obsessed with a discontinued line of missions to Earth undertaken with a "Madness Cloak". After taking the cloak, she becomes stuck on Earth in the body of a female high school bully who had been in a coma after nearly drowning in a lake.
- Mother Panic – by Jody Houser and Tommy Lee Edwards – is about Violet Paige, a young celebrity who seeks revenge on her privileged peers under a secret identity in Gotham City. She is often monitored by Batman and the Bat-Family.
- Doom Patrol – by Gerard Way and Nick Derington – is another series from DC featuring freakish superheroes. The protagonist is Casey Brinke, an EMT who can only remember impossible things from her childhood. She is introduced into Dannyland, a seemingly impossible place that has the answers to her past and her future.
- Cave Carson Has a Cybernetic Eye – by Jon Rivera, Gerard Way, and Michael Avon Oeming – is a revival of an obscure DC character, the underground explorer Cave Carson. Twelve years after retirement, Carson joins his daughter Chloe in adventures, stealing his old digging machine and setting forth on a wacky adventure involving cults, mushrooms, and Superman.
- Bug: The Adventures of Forager – miniseries by Lee Allred, Michael Allred, and Laura Allred – is based on the 1970s Jack-Kirby-created character Forager.
- Eternity Girl – miniseries by writer Magdalene Visaggio and artist Sonny Liew – began as a result of the Milk Wars crossover event. Caroline Sharp, a former super-spy, possesses the power of eternal life and seeks to end the universe in order to terminate her existence. Themes of depression and existentialism were explored throughout the 6-issue series.
- Collapser – by Mikey Way and Shaun Simon.
- Far Sector – by Nora Keita Jemisin and Jamal Campbell – is a 12-issue science fiction murder mystery. This story features a newly-introduced Green Lantern, Sojourner Mullein, far from Earth. It was nominated for the 2021 Eisner Award for Best Limited Series.
- Shade, the Changing Woman – by Cecil Castelucci and Marley Zarcone – a follow-up to the Shade, the Changing Girl.
- Cave Carson Has an Interstellar Eye – by Jon Rivera and Michael Avon Oeming – a follow-up to Cave Carson Has a Cybernetic Eye.
- Doom Patrol: Weight of the Worlds – by Gerard Way, Jeremy Lambert, and James Harvey – a follow-up to Gerard's run of Doom Patrol.

== Collected editions ==
| Title | Material collected | Date | ISBN |
|---|---|---|---|
| Doom Patrol, vol. 1: Brick by Brick | Doom Patrol #1-6 | 2017-05-31 | 978-1-4012-6979-1 |
| Mother Panic, vol. 1: Work in Progress | Mother Panic #1-6 | 2017-06-14 | 978-1-4012-7111-4 |
| Cave Carson Has a Cybernetic Eye, vol. 1: Going Underground | Cave Carson Has a Cybernetic Eye #1-6 | 2017-06-28 | 978-1-4012-7082-7 |
| Shade, the Changing Girl, vol. 1: Earth Girl Made Easy | Shade, the Changing Girl #1-6 | 2017-07-12 | 978-1-4012-7099-5 |
| Shade, the Changing Girl, vol. 2: Little Runaway | Shade, the Changing Girl #7-12 | 2018-01-31 | 978-1-4012-7545-7 |
| Cave Carson Has a Cybernetic Eye, vol. 2: Every Me, Every You | Cave Carson Has a Cybernetic Eye #7-12 | 2018-02-07 | 978-1-4012-7747-5 |
| Mother Panic, vol. 2: Under Her Skin | Mother Panic #7-12 | 2018-02-21 | 978-1-4012-7768-0 |
| Bug! The Adventures of Forager | Bug! The Adventures of Forager #1-6 | 2018-04-25 | 978-1-4012-7530-3 |
| DC/Young Animal: Milk Wars | JLA/Doom Patrol Special #1, Mother Panic/Batman Special #1, Shade, the Changing Girl/Wonder Woman Special #1, Cave Carson Has a Cybernetic Eye/Swamp Thing Special #1, Doom Patrol/JLA Special #1 | 2018-06-13 | 978-1-4012-7733-8 |
| Mother Panic: Gotham A.D. | Mother Panic: Gotham A.D. #1-6 | 2018-11-07 | 978-1-4012-8100-7 |
| Eternity Girl | Eternity Girl #1-6 | 2018-11-28 | 978-1-4012-8520-3 |
| Cave Carson Has an Interstellar Eye | Cave Carson Has an Interstellar Eye #1-6 | 2018-12-12 | 978-1-4012-8540-1 |
| Doom Patrol, Vol. 2: Nada | Doom Patrol #7-12 | 2018-12-19 | 978-1-4012-7500-6 |
| Shade, the Changing Woman | Shade, the Changing Woman #1-6 | 2019-01-09 | 978-1-4012-8570-8 |
| Collapser | Collapser #1-6 | 2020-08-04 | 978-1-4012-9581-3 |
| Doom Patrol: Weight of the Worlds | Doom Patrol: Weight of the Worlds #1-7 | 2020-09-22 | 978-1-77950-078-6 |
| Far Sector | Far Sector #1-12 | 2021-10-19 | 978-1-77951-205-5 |
| Doom Patrol by Gerard Way and Nick Derington - The Deluxe Edition | Doom Patrol #1-12 and Doom Patrol: Weight of the Worlds #1-7 | 2023-02-28 | 978-1-77952-138-5 |
