= Jody Houser =

American comics writer

- Houser at Dragon Con in 2026
- Area: Writer
- Notable works: Faith; Mother Panic; Vox Machina Origins

Jody Houser is an American professional comics writer known for her work on adaptations and licensed properties. She was nominated for the Eisner Award in 2017 for her writing in the comic series Faith (2016). Additionally, she was the writer on the second volume of Critical Role: Vox Machina Origins, which became a New York Times best-seller in September 2020.

== Career ==
From 2010 to 2015, Houser self published the webcomic Cupcake POW!; she created the comic after reading a survey on the audience desire of female comic readers. Houser stated that "the summary was girls don’t need comics about 'princesses and unicorns and cupcakes'. And I thought, ‘Huh, what would a comic about a cupcake be like?'". The success of the webcomic pushed her further into comics. In 2012, Houser wrote "Everwell", with artists Fiona Staples and Adriana Blake, for the Kickstarter funded anthology Womanthology: Heroic. Houser stated that Staples selected her pitch as the one she wanted to draw for the project. By 2015, Houser had "contributed to a wide range of anthologies from just about every comic publisher". She then became the co-writer on the limited series Orphan Black (2015), for IDW Publishing, which was her first non-anthology or one-shot comic.

In 2016, Houser began writing the first solo series about the superhero Faith Herbert from Valiant Comics. PBS highlighted that Faith "sold out five times in its limited-run series, a significant feat in the comic book industry" which led to Valiant launching an ongoing series starting Faith, with Houser as the writer, in July 2016. NPR's review stated that "Houser has accomplished something deceptively simple: she's made Faith a fun character to spend time with. Faith is lighthearted but virtuous, with a cheesy sense of humor, compassion and smarts". Karen Walsh, for GeekMom in 2016, wrote that "Houser’s voice and her range place her on the precipice of comic writing popularity. I hope that with an ongoing Valiant book, she’ll be able to reach the level of respect and popularity she deserves. [...] Houser writes voices for the disaffected, manages to engage readers in the inner lives of characters, and is able to engage her readers by connecting to their varied lived experiences". In 2017, Faith (2016) was nominated for the "Best New Series" Eisner Award. Houser went on to write two sequel limited series: Faith & The Future Force (2017) and Faith: Dreamside (2018).

Houser was involved in several Geek & Sundry productions, including starring as Tkaah in the actual play web series VAST (2016) and guest starring as herself in the comics talk web show The Wednesday Club (2016) and as the Time Lord Corsair in the actual play web series TBD RPG (2017).

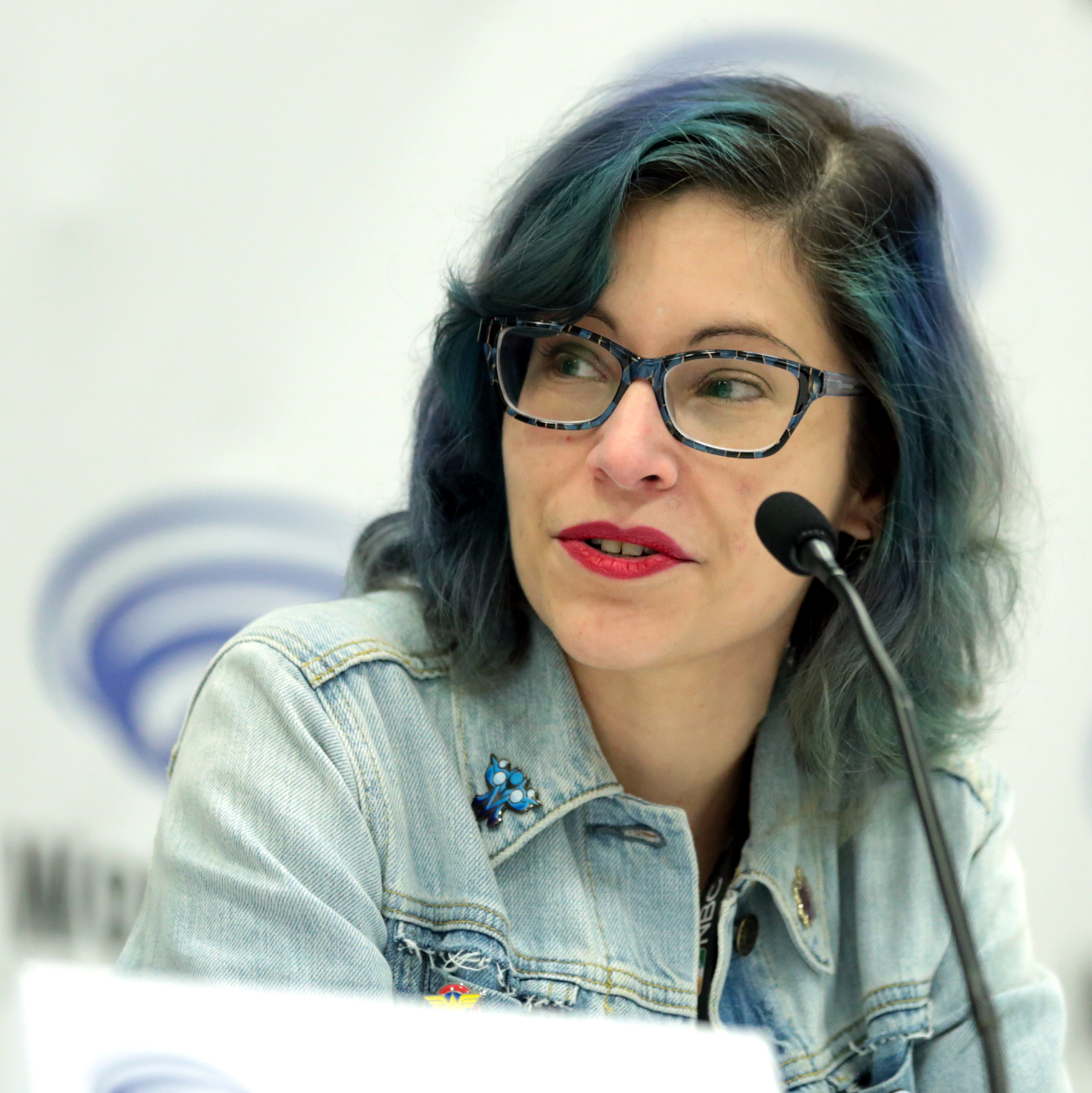
Houser at the 2018 WonderCon

Houser was brought on to write Mother Panic (2017) for the DC Comics imprint Young Animal after she was asked by editor Molly Mahan to write several sample pages featuring Mother Panic to see if she "could nail [her] voice". The series and its title character, Violet Paige, was conceived by Young Animal curator Gerard Way and illustrator Tommy Lee Edwards. Houser expanded upon Way's and Edwards' concept to "flesh out" the main character and establish her within Gotham City and the Batman mythos. Reviewing the first issue for IGN, Jesse Schedeen wrote that "Mother Panic felt distinctive from the Batman family and surreal". In January 2017, Houser co-wrote two Justice League of America one-shot issues with Steve Orlando. In 2017 and 2018, Houser was a co-writer on several Supergirl issues during Orlando's run in the DC Rebirth era. In 2019, she returned to write the series, with artist Rachael Stott, until the cancellation of the series in 2020. During this time, she also wrote the six issue mini-series Harley Quinn and Poison Ivy (2019) with artist Adriana Melo which was part of the Year of the Villain event.

In 2017, for Marvel Comics, Houser became the writer on the ongoing Amazing Spider-Man: Renew Your Vows (2016) with issue #13 until the series ended in 2018. This series was followed by the three-issue limited series Spider-Girls, which Houser wrote for the 2018 comics event Spider-Geddon. In 2019, she wrote several one-shots for Marvel Comics and the five-issue limited series The Web of Black Widow (2019). In The Beat's "Marvel Rundown", Joe Grunenwald commented that "Houser is, for my money, one of the most consistently solid writers working in comics, and she shows it in this first issue" of The Web of Black Widow; Samantha Puc and AJ Frost also commended Houser's writing both in this issue and more broadly. In 2022, Houser wrote a series of connected one-shots, collected as Ms. Marvel: Fists of Justice; each issue featured Ms. Marvel teaming up with a different hero (Wolverine, Moon Knight, and Venom). In 2023, Houser returned to the Renew Your Vows characters with a story arc in the digital comic series Spider-Man Unlimited Infinity Comic.

In 2025, she contributed to the one-shot anthology LA Strong: A Charity Comic for Victims of the LA Wildfires published by Mad Cave Studios. The Beat highlighted that all profits will be donated to "comic creators impacted by" the January 2025 Southern California wildfires. Also in 2025, Houser announced that she had been working as a writer on the upcoming video game March of Giants.

As part of Marvel's X-Men: Shadows of Tomorrow relaunch, starting in February 2026, Houser was the writer on the ongoing series Generation X-23.

=== Adaptations and licensed properties ===
Houser has written Star Wars adaptations for Marvel Comics such as Rogue One: A Star Wars Story (2016) and Star Wars: Thrawn (2018). She also wrote the original limited series Star Wars: TIE Fighter (2019). Charlie Hall, reviewing TIE Fighter for Polygon, wrote "it's penned by Eisner nominated writer Jody Houser, who somehow made the Rogue One: A Star Wars Story comic adaptation leaps and bounds more appetizing than the film itself. She also managed to reign in Timothy Zahn’s meandering reboot of the Grand Admiral Thrawn character with a series of clear, concise comics. TIE Fighter just might be some of her best work yet". In 2023, she wrote an arc for the Star Wars: Yoda (2022) limited series with artist Luke Ross and wrote the comic adaptation of Star Wars: Obi-Wan Kenobi (2023) with artist Salvador Larocca. A five-issue adaptation of Star Wars: The Rise of Skywalker (2019), written by Houser with artist Will Sliney, was planned to debut in mid-2020. However, this was later cancelled, making the film the first in the franchise not to receive a serialized comic adaptation. The comic was later revived, with the first issue released in February 2025.

Houser has also written multiple comic runs on several other licensed properties such as Doctor Who (for Titan Comics), Star Trek (for IDW Publishing), Stranger Things and Critical Role (for Dark Horse Comics). Houser was a member of the writer's room for the ongoing series Star Trek: Year Five which ran from 2019 to 2021. Upon the conclusion of the series, Jamie Lovett, for ComicBook.com, wrote: "Star Trek: Year Five is a remarkable achievement for a licensed comic. Often, these titles have little new or exciting to offer fans of their source material and even less for those who aren't familiar, ultimately feeling redundant or vestigial. Star Trek: Year Five is neither. It set out on a mission to tell an essential missing chapter in the lives of these characters, and it succeeded". In Publishers Weekly's "Best-selling Books Week Ending August 23, 2020", Houser's Critical Role: Vox Machina Origins Volume 2 was 6th in "Trade Paperbacks". Then in September 2020, the trade paperback reached #13 on The New York Times Best Seller list in the "Graphic Books and Manga" category. ICv2 highlighted that Houser was on two best seller charts in June 2023 for her licensed work – #6 on "Circana BookScan Top 20 Author Graphic Novels" for Critical Role: The Mighty Nein Origins – Mollymauk Tealeaf (May 2023) and #16 on "Circana BookScan Top 20 Superhero Graphic Novels" for Stranger Things and Dungeons & Dragons (July 2021).

== Personal life ==
Houser studied English at the University of Miami with a focus on creative writing. Houser then earned a MFA in creative writing from Emerson College where she won the "Rod Parker Fellowship for Playwriting". In 2005, she moved to Los Angeles to pursue screenwriting. Houser enjoys role-playing games and is a player in a long running Star Wars role-playing game.

In September 2020, she said that she quit her last day job "in 2016 to write full-time, and have been doing that ever since, with the occasional stint as a professional RPG player". In July 2021, Houser stated that she "had a full-time job while writing comics full-time for longer than I’d have liked" and she had only recently started "doing comics full-time".

== Works ==
=== Dark Horse Comics ===
- Halo Wars 2
  - Halo: Rise of Atriox #2 (2017)
- StarCraft
  - StarCraft: Scavengers #1–4 (2018)
  - StarCraft: Soldiers #1 (2019)
  - StarCraft: Survivors #1–4 (2019)
- Stranger Things
  - Stranger Things #1–4 (2018)
  - Stranger Things: Six #1–4 (2019)
  - Stranger Things: Into the Fire #1–4 (2020)
  - Stranger Things: Science Camp #1–4 (2020)
  - Stranger Things and Dungeons & Dragons #1–4 (2020)
  - Stranger Things: Tales From Hawkins #1–4 (2023)
  - Stranger Things and Dungeons & Dragons: The Rise of Hellfire #1–4 (2025)
- Critical Role
  - Critical Role: Vox Machina Origins Series Two #1–6 (2019)
  - Critical Role: Vox Machina Origins Series Three #1–6 (2021)
  - Critical Role: The Mighty Nein Origins – Caleb Widogast (2022)
  - Critical Role: The Mighty Nein Origins – Mollymauk Tealeaf (2023)
  - Critical Role: Vox Machina Origins Series Four #1–6 (2024)
- Farseer trilogy
  - Assassin's Apprentice #1–6 (2022)
  - Assassin's Apprentice II #1–6 (2023)

=== DC Comics ===
- Mother Panic
  - Mother Panic #1–12 (2017)
  - Milk Wars: Mother Panic/Batman Special (2018)
  - Mother Panic: Gotham A.D #1–6 (2018)
- Justice League of America
  - Justice League of America: Killer Frost Rebirth #1 (2017)
  - Justice League of America: Vixen Rebirth #1 (2017)
- Supergirl (vol. 7) #15–18, 20, 37–42 (2016)
- Harley Quinn and Poison Ivy #1–6 (2019)

=== Mad Cave Studios ===
- LA Strong: A Charity Comic for Victims of the LA Wildfires (2025)

=== IDW Publishing ===
- Womanthology: Heroic "Everwell" (2012)
- Womanthology: Space "Trinkets" (2013)
- Orphan Black #1–5 (2015)
- Star Trek: Year Five #5–6, 15–16, 25 (2019)

=== Marvel Comics ===
- The Cavalry: SHIELD 50th Anniversary #1 (2015)
- Maximum Ride
  - Max Ride: Ultimate Flight #1–5 (2015)
  - Max Ride: Final Flight #1–5 (2016)
- Star Wars
  - Rogue One: A Star Wars Story #1–6 (2016)
  - Star Wars: Thrawn #1–6 (2018)
  - Star Wars: Age of Republic #1–9 (2018)
  - Star Wars: TIE Fighter #1–5 (2019)
  - Star Wars: Life Day #1 (2021)
  - Star Wars: Yoda #4–6 (2022)
  - Star Wars: Return Of The Jedi – The Empire #1 (2023)
  - Star Wars: Obi-Wan Kenobi #1–6 (2023)
  - Thrawn: Alliances #1–4 (2024)
  - Star Wars: The Rise of Skywalker Adaptation #1–5 (2025)
- Spider-Man
  - Amazing Spider-Man: Renew Your Vows #13–23 (2016)
  - Spider-Girls #1–3 (2018)
  - What If...? Dark: Spider-Gwen #1 (2023)
  - Spider-Man Unlimited Infinity Comic #13–18 (2023)
- Black Widow
  - The Web of Black Widow #1–5 (2019)
- Captain Marvel
  - Captain Marvel: Braver & Mightier #1 (2019)
- Wolverine
  - Wolverine Annual #1 (2019)
  - Generation X-23 (2026)
- Venom
  - Venom 2099 #1 (2019)
- Ms. Marvel
  - Ms. Marvel & Wolverine #1 (2022)
  - Ms. Marvel & Moon Knight #1 (2022)
  - Ms. Marvel & Venom #1 (2022)

=== Northwest Press ===
- Rise: Comics Against Bullying Volume 1 "Origin Story" (2015)

=== Titan Comics ===
- Doctor Who
  - Doctor Who: The Thirteenth Doctor #1–12, Season 1 (2018)
  - Doctor Who: The Thirteenth Doctor Holiday Special #1–2 (2019)
  - Doctor Who: The Thirteenth Doctor #1–4, Season 2 (2020)
  - Doctor Who: Alternating Current #1–4 (2020)
  - Doctor Who: Defender of the Daleks #1–2 (2020)
  - Doctor Who: Missy – The Master Plan #1–4 (2021)
  - Doctor Who: Empire of the Wolf #1–4 (2021)
  - Doctor Who: Origins #1–4 (2022)
  - Doctor Who: A Doctor in the House Part One & Two (2023)

=== Valiant Comics ===
- Faith
  - Faith #1–4, Volume 1 (2016)
  - Faith #1–12, Volume 2 (2016)
  - Faith & The Future Force #1–4 (2017)
  - Faith: Dreamside (2018)

=== Big Finish Productions ===
- Doctor Who
  - Call Me Master: Monsters "The Ideal Quarry" (2025)

| Preceded by Marc Andreyko | Supergirl writer 2019–2020 | Succeeded by Tom King |
| Preceded by Matthew Colville | Vox Machina Origins writer 2019–present | Most recent |
