= Harley Quinn and Poison Ivy =

American comic book miniseries

Publication information
- Publisher: DC Comics
- Schedule: Monthly
- Format: Limited
- Publication date: September 4, 2019 – February 12, 2020
- No. of issues: 6
- Main character(s): Harley Quinn; Poison Ivy

Creative team
- Written by: Jody Houser
- Artist(s): Adriana Melo

Harley Quinn and Poison Ivy is an American comic book miniseries written by Jody Houser, with art by Adriana Melo. The six-issue miniseries was published by the publishing company DC Comics as a Heroes in Crisis spin-off, and centers on the characters of Harley Quinn and Poison Ivy. In the miniseries, Harley seeks to find a cure for Ivy following the latter's death and rebirth in Heroes in Crisis.

The six issues were published monthly from September 4, 2019, to February 12, 2020. (Note: The six issues were published on September 4, 2019; October 9, 2019; November 13, 2019; December 11, 2019; January 8, 2020; and February 12, 2020.) According to review aggregator Comic Book Roundup, the first issue scored an average of 7.7/10 based on 24 critic reviews, while the series as a whole averaged 7.5/10 based on 72 critic reviews. Reviewing the first issue, Newsarama's Kat Calamia praised the "emotional storyline", while ComicBook.com's Christian Hoffer was disappointed by the lack of confirmation of the romantic nature of Harley and Ivy's relationship.
