= Future State =

DC Comics comic book event

- The cover of Future State: Justice League #1 (January 2021, DC Comics), featuring new characters introduced during the storyline. Art by Dan Mora.

Publication information
- Publisher: DC Comics
- Format: Multiple limited series
- Genre: Superhero
- Publication date: January – March 2021

Creative team
- Written by: Multiple
- Artist: Multiple

"Future State" is a comic book storyline published by DC Comics in January and February 2021, (Note: One series, Future State: Superman vs. Imperious Lex, concluded publication in March 2021.) consisting of multiple limited series released in place of DC's regular ongoing series during those months. The event is set in the aftermath of the "Dark Nights: Death Metal" storyline, and takes place in a "possible future" of the DC Universe. The conclusion of the event leads into DC's Infinite Frontier relaunch.

== Publication history ==
DC Comics originally announced Generations as the event that would unite all eras in the history of the DC Universe, starting with Generation Zero: Gods Among Us, which was scheduled to release during Free Comic Book Day on May 2, 2020. However, following the firing of publisher Dan DiDio from DC Entertainment in February and the effects of the COVID-19 pandemic on the comics industry, the series was delayed. Writer Scott Snyder stated the plans for Generations had become more "fluid", and in June, Generation Zero was not part of DC's plans for the revised Free Comic Book Day. As well, DC Comics publisher and chief creative officer Jim Lee stated that the 5G initiative, which would have occurred at the end of the original plan for Generations was no longer happening: "We had a lot of great ideas that we were floating around. And rather than dumping it all in one month and renumbering the line and going for that really short term spike in sales, we just naturally gravitated to the story ideas and concepts we love and building them into the mythology, the ongoing mythology, in a very organic way".

In September 2020, DC announced "Future State" to be scheduled for January and February 2021. In October, Snyder also assured the ending of Dark Nights: Death Metal would be tied directly to the event. He responded that "it's hooked into everything. We're building the DCU plan together with editors and other writers and artists. I'm really excited about it. Death Metal ends in January, and then January and February is "Future State", which is going to give glimpses of possible DC futures. That was built while we were doing Death Metal to lead into some stuff which isn't happening anymore, but those plans have taken a new shape, which is exciting. Death Metal is very tied into and hooks into everything happening on the other side—the whole DCU is working together, plus we have some surprises lined up later in the year".

== Titles ==
=== Batman family ===
- Future State: Batman/Superman #1–2
- Future State: Dark Detective #1–4
- Future State: Catwoman #1–2
- Future State: Harley Quinn #1–2
- Future State: The Next Batman #1–4
- Future State: Nightwing #1–2
- Future State: Robin Eternal #1–2

=== Superman family ===
- Future State: House of El #1
- Future State: Kara Zor-El, Superwoman #1–2
- Future State: Immortal Wonder Woman #1–2
- Future State: Legion of Super-Heroes #1–2
- Future State: Superman of Metropolis #1–2
- Future State: Superman vs. Imperious Lex #1–3
- Future State: Superman: Worlds of War #1–2
- Future State: Superman/Wonder Woman #1–2
- Future State: Wonder Woman #1–2

=== Justice League family ===
- Future State: Aquaman #1–2
- Future State: The Flash #1–2
- Future State: Green Lantern #1–2
- Future State: Justice League #1–2
- Future State: Shazam! #1–2
- Future State: Suicide Squad #1–2
- Future State: Swamp Thing #1–2
- Future State: Teen Titans #1–2

=== Aftermath ===
- Future State: Gotham
- Green Lantern
- Superman: Son of Kal-El
- The Next Batman: Second Son
- Teen Titans Academy
- Wonder Girl
- Aquaman: The Becoming
- I Am Batman

== Critical reception ==
At the review aggregator website Comic Book Roundup, the storyline garnered an average score of 7.8 out of 10, based on 809 reviews.

== Collected editions ==
Title	Material collected	Publication date	ISBN
Future State: Dark Detective	Future State: Dark Detective #1-4 (main story and backup stories from #2 and #4), Future State: Catwoman #1-2, Future State: Harley Quinn #1-2, Future State: Robin Eternal #1-2, Future State: Batman/Superman #1-2	July 6, 2021	978-1779510716
Future State: Justice League	Future State: Justice League #1-2, Future State: Aquaman #1-2, Future State: Green Lantern #1-2, Future State: The Flash #1-2	June 22, 2021	978-1779510655
Future State: Superman	Future State: Superman of Metropolis #1-2, Future State: Superman vs. Imperious Lex #1-3, Future State: Superman: Worlds at War #1-2, Future State: House of El #1, Future State: Kara Zor-El, Superwoman #1-2, Future State: Legion of Super-Heroes #1-2	June 29, 2021	978-1779510686
Future State: The Next Batman	Future State: The Next Batman #1-4, Future State: Nightwing #1-2 and backup stories from Future State: Dark Detective #1 and #3	June 15, 2021	978-1779510648
Future State: Wonder Woman	Future State: Wonder Woman #1-2, Future State: Immortal Wonder Woman #1-2, Future State: Superman/Wonder Woman #1-2	July 20, 2021	978-1779510747
Future State: Suicide Squad	Future State: Suicide Squad #1-2, Future State: Teen Titans #1-2, Future State: Shazam! #1-2, Future State: Swamp Thing #1-2	July 13, 2021	978-1779510723
Future State: Gotham Vol. 1	Future State: Gotham #1-7 and material from Future State: Dark Detective #2-4	April 12, 2022	978-1779514363
Future State: Gotham Vol. 2	Future State: Gotham #8-12	September 27, 2022	978-1779516800
Future State: Gotham Vol. 3: Batmen at War	Future State: Gotham #13-18	April 11, 2023	978-1779520005

== See also ==
- DC One Million
- The New 52: Futures End
