= The Batman Who Laughs =

Fictional character in DC Comics

- The Batman Who Laughs and his Robins as depicted in The Batman Who Laughs #1 (January 2018)

Publication information
- Publisher: DC Comics
- First appearance: Dark Days: The Casting #1 (July 12, 2017)
- Created by: Scott Snyder (writer); Greg Capullo (artist)

In-story information
- Alter ego: Bruce Wayne
- Species: Metahuman
- Place of origin: Earth -22 (Dark Multiverse)
- Team affiliations: Dark Knights of the Dark Multiverse; Legion of Doom; Secret Six; Justice League (formerly)
- Notable aliases: Batman, Darkest Knight
- Abilities: Genius-level intellect; Peak human physical condition; Master martial artist and hand-to-hand combatant; Utilizes high-tech equipment and weapons; After gaining Doctor Manhattan's powers: Reality manipulation; Flight; Teleportation

The Batman Who Laughs (Bruce Wayne) is a supervillain appearing in American comic books published by DC Comics. Created by writer Scott Snyder and artist Greg Capullo, he is an evil counterpart and alternate version of Batman within the Dark Multiverse.

A hybrid of Batman and Batman's archenemy the Joker, he is a member of the Dark Knights and, with the cosmic deities Perpetua and Barbatos, an antagonist of DC's Dark Multiverse storylines from 2017 to 2021, following DC Rebirth. He first appeared in the crossover Dark Nights: Metal, then headlined his own series and was the main antagonist of Batman/Superman (2019) and the Year of the Villain event alongside Lex Luthor.

His name is an allusion to the original Batman's seriousness and to the 1928 film The Man Who Laughs, which served as inspiration for the Joker.

== Publication history ==
The Batman Who Laughs was created by Scott Snyder and Greg Capullo, first appearing in the comic book Dark Days: The Casting. The character was depicted as an alternate universe Batman who does not have a code against killing. Snyder explained his intent on the character in an interview by The Hollywood Reporter: "He's basically Batman's worst nightmare come to life: Batman, if he was infected by the Joker toxin and lost all sense of ethics. What he wants to do in Gotham is bring Bruce's worst nightmares to life". Snyder's hope was that his character would be popular enough to get his own comic book series, and Snyder believed that "Jock would be the perfect person to do it".

The Batman Who Laughs (vol. 2) #2 was the best-selling comic by unit volume in the North American direct market in January 2019, with about 116,800 copies ordered.

== Fictional character biography ==
The Batman Who Laughs is a version of Batman from Earth -22 of the Dark Multiverse. In that reality, the Earth -22 Joker learns that he is dying owing to the chemicals in his body, and sets out to push Batman harder than ever before, killing most of Batman's other rogues and subjecting Gotham City's citizens to the chemicals that transformed him, killing parents in front of their children to mock Bruce. Batman snaps and kills the Joker in a struggle, which releases a concentrated form of the toxin in Joker's body. Batman gains an appearance and personality similar to that of the Joker. The Batman Who Laughs takes over Earth -22, killing off most of his allies and turning his son Damian Wayne into a mini-Joker, while recruiting children infected by the Joker Toxin as his "Rabid Robins". The Batman Who Laughs later meets Lex Luthor, who offers him a place in the Legion of Doom.

The Batman Who Laughs recruits alternate versions of Bruce Wayne to launch a mass assault on the main universe's Batman. The Batman Who Laughs is allied with the Grim Knight, a version of Batman who uses guns and turned his Gotham into a military dictatorship. With no other way to stop his other self, Batman is forced to accept a transfusion from the Joker that begins to turn him into a variation of the Batman Who Laughs. Batman defeats his other self and is restored to normal, while the Batman Who Laughs is locked up in the Hall of Justice.

A year later, The Batman Who Laughs is still locked up in the Hall of Justice, but having previously infected several heroes including James Gordon, sets a plan in motion with the help of his new Secret Six. He starts by having Gordon lead Batman and Superman to the cave under Crime Alley, where King Shazam seemingly infects Superman. The Batman Who Laughs tells Superman that he plans to infect the world with his serum.

During the "Dark Nights: Death Metal" storyline, The Batman Who Laughs becomes Perpetua's lieutenant, aided by an army of evil Batmen from the Dark Multiverse called the Dark Knights. Wonder Woman is confronted by the Batman Who Laughs, whom she proceeds to kill with her Chainsaw of Truth. The Dark Knights save the Batman Who Laughs' brain and transfer it into the body of Batmanhattan, a version of Bruce Wayne who copied the formula that created Doctor Manhattan. The Batman Who Laughs, now possessing Manhattan's reality-warping powers, rechristens himself the Darkest Knight.

Wonder Woman confronts the Darkest Knight, a battle that spans across time and space. She is brought to the birth of creation, where the Darkest Knight reveals that Perpetua's people (referred to as the "Hands") intend to destroy the universe. Wonder Woman has two choices: keep fighting and lose or surrender to the Darkest Knight and use their combined power to kill the Hands. Refusing to give up, Wonder Woman strikes back at the Darkest Knight, pushing him forward through time, sending him into the dying embers of Earth's sun. Wonder Woman shoves the Darkest Knight into the sun, killing him.

== Collected editions ==
Title	Material collected	Published date	ISBN
Dark Nights: Metal — Dark Knights Rising	Batman: The Red Death #1, Batman: The Devastator #1, Batman: The Merciless #1, Batman: The Murder Machine #1, Batman: The Drowned #1, Batman: The Dawnbreaker #1, The Batman Who Laughs (vol. 1) #1, Dark Knights Rising: The Wild Hunt #1	June 2018	978-1401289072
The Batman Who Laughs	The Batman Who Laughs (vol. 2) #1–7, The Batman Who Laughs: The Grim Knight #1	September 2019	978-1401294038

== Powers and abilities ==
The Batman Who Laughs has the same abilities as Batman, combined with the twisted nihilism of the Joker. He wears a futuristic visor made out of "Dark Metal" that gives him a form of precognition, and wields various weapons, including machine guns, knives, and a bladed chain.

The Batman Who Laughs also uses batarangs made of "Dark Metal" that can bring out the worst version of the victim.

In Dark Nights: Death Metal, the Batman Who Laughs gains the powers of Doctor Manhattan after Dr. Arkham transplants his brain into the body of a Bruce Wayne who possesses Manhattan's abilities, including reality manipulation, flight, and teleportation.

Like other inhabitants of the Dark Multiverse, The Batman Who Laughs is vulnerable to Nth Metal.

== Reception ==
Reviewing the first issue of the solo series for CBR, Mike Fugere wrote that it "feels like a descent into an unforeseen nightmare" and described Snyder's horror writing as his strongest work. Reviewers at Polygon, io9, and CBR described the character as horrifying. Comic Book Resources describes The Batman Who Laughs as comprising all the "best" parts of Batman and the "worst" parts of the Joker.

The character has been compared to Judge Death in design. The character's creator, Scott Snyder, noted that the two characters have a similar aesthetic.

== In other media ==
=== Video games ===
- The Batman Who Laughs appears in DC Universe Online, voiced by Joey Hood.
- The Batman Who Laughs appears as a playable character in Fortnite.
- The Batman Who Laughs appears as a DLC skin for Noob Saibot in Mortal Kombat 11.
- The Batman Who Laughs appears as a skin for the Joker in MultiVersus, voiced by Roger Craig Smith.
- The Batman Who Laughs appears in DC: Dark Legion, voiced again by Roger Craig Smith.
- The Batman Who Laughs appears as an unlockable Metal card in the mobile version of Injustice: Gods Among Us.
- The Batman Who Laughs appears in Lego Batman: Legacy of the Dark Knight as an alternate skin for Batman.

=== Board games ===
- The Batman Who Laughs Rising is a 2020 cooperative strategy dice game from The Op.
- The Batman Who Laughs appears in Zombicide.

=== Merchandise ===
Knight Models has a line of gaming miniatures based on the DC comics run. Funko has released action figures of the character. Various figures from companies such as Diamond Select Toys and Prime 1 Studios have produced figures as well. McFarlane Toys has also made a version of The Batman Who Laughs for their new DC Multiverse line of 7-inch figures. McFarlane Toys also made a 5-inch Super Powers figure of The Batman Who Laughs in 2022.
