= Adriana Melo =

Brazilian comic book artist and penciller

- Born: 1976-77 São Paulo, Brazil
- Area: Penciller
- Notable works: Iron Man, Fantastic Four, Silver Surfer, Rose & Thorn, Birds of Prey, Sinestro, Witchblade
- Awards: 2019 Eisner Award for Best Anthology

Adriana Melo is a Brazilian comic book artist, colorist, and penciller. She has worked on various Star Wars, Marvel Comics, and DC Comics titles. Notably, she worked on the Star Wars: Empire series. She has also worked on DC Comics' Rose & Thorn and Birds of Prey as well as Top Cow's Witchblade and Marvel Comics's Ms. Marvel. In 2018 she collaborated with writer Gail Simone on a six-issue DC miniseries featuring Plastic Man.

Melo participated in the comic anthology Puerto Rico Strong, which won the 2019 Eisner Award for Best Anthology.

== Biography ==
Adriana Melo was born in São Paulo, Brazil on June 19, 1976. As a young child, she had more of an interest in creating artworks and wanted to be a comic book artist. At 16 while in a technical drawing course in high school, she had one of her first experiences with drawing comic images. She penciled a color reproduced of a scene in "The Death of Superman". During this time, the Jornal A Tarde featured an interview with artist Roger Cruz which further sparked her interested in graphic novel creation. The pursuit into the field of graphic novel creation gave the opportunity to combine two areas of study that she enjoyed: the study of the human figure and comics.

Attending her first comic event in São Paulo, Brazil, Adriana spoke to two professionals in the graphic novel industry that were evaluating portfolios. Roger Cruz and Marc Campos liked the materials and arranged for contact for Adrianna and an agency that brokers in art and comics. After six months of training, she received her first job opportunity to work on Iron Man. Eventually, Adriana would contribute to Fantastic Four, Silver Surfer, and other titles.

Her first job was working on a special editions for LucasArts that produced the Star Wars: Empire magazine series where she worked with Ron Marz. At the same time, she also worked on the DC Comic miniseries Rose & Thorn, contributed to art for Birds of Prey (including covers), Emma Frost, and illustrated pinups for Samurai: Heaven & Earth. Eventually, she would pencil for Witchblade in which she worked with Ron Marz to create the character Danielle Baptiste. Adriana became the first woman to draw this character in Justiceiro, which is a Punisher-Witchblade crossover.

Recently, Adriana has worked on Sinestro Corps Special: Parallax, Ms. Marvel Jackpot, and collaborated on volume 2 of Birds of Prey.

== Publishers ==
Adriana has worked on projects from DC Comics, Marvel Comics, Dark Horse Comics, and Top Cow Productions.

== Bibliography ==
=== Artist ===
- Action Comics: #1035, #1037, #1038, #1039, #1041, #1042
- Astonishing Tales: #6
- Captain Marvel/Ms.Marvel: Secret Invasion - The Infiltration: #1
- Catwoman: #1, Vol. 2: Dollhouse, Vol. 3: Death of the Family
- Doctor Who: the Lost Dimension: Book 2
- Doctor Who: the Ninth Doctor: #1-3, #5, #6, #14, #15, Vol. 2-4
- Female Furies: #1-6
- Harley & Ivy Meet Betty & Veronica
- Harley Quinn and Poison Ivy: #1-6
- Ms. Marvel: #25-26, #28-30, #34
- Plastic Man: #1-6
- Star Wars: Obi Wan (2022): #5
- Star Wars Empire: #22, #26, #28-30, #32, #E
- Star Wars Tales: #14
- Superman: Action Comics Vol. 2: The Arena
- Wonder Girl: #2, #3, #4, #5
- Wonder Girl 2022 Annual #1

=== Penciller ===
- The Amazing Spider-Man: #607
- The Amazing Spider-Man Presents: Jackpot: #1-3
- Art of the Witchblade: #1
- Astonishing Tales: #6
- Birds of Prey: #2-6, #14-15, #86, Endrun, Perfect Pitch, The Battle Within, The Death of Oracle
- Catwoman: #7, #8
- DC Universe Online Legends: #1-3, #5, Vol. 1
- Dream Angel: #0, #1
- Emma Frost: #13
- Fantastic Four Unplugged: #2-5
- Girl Comics: #3
- Green Lantern: Tales of the Sinestro Corps
- Green Lantern/Sinestro Corp Secret Files: #1
- Iron Man: #320
- Marvel's Voices: Comunidades #1
- Rose and Thorn: #1-6
- Silver Surfer: #124
- Superman/Batman: #85
- Tales of the Sinestro Corps Presents: Parallax #1
- Teen Titans: Team Building
- Truth & Justice: #3
- War of Kings: Warriors: #2
- Witchblade: #99-104, #106, #130
- Wonder Girl: #1

=== Colorist ===
- Birds of Prey: #81-90
- Justice League of America: Team History

=== Cover Artist ===
- The Deadliest Bouquet
- Doctor Who: The Four Doctors (Variant Cover Artist)
- Doctor Who: The Ninth Doctor Special: #1
- Dream Angel: #0, #1
- Grimm Fairy Tales: #38
- Grimm Fairy Tales: Escape from Wonderland: #0,1
- Mark Dawson's Beatrix Rose: Vigilante: #1-5
- The Recount: #1 (Variant Cover Artist)
- Red Sonja: #18 (Variant Cover Artist)
