= Mirka Andolfo =

Italian comics artist

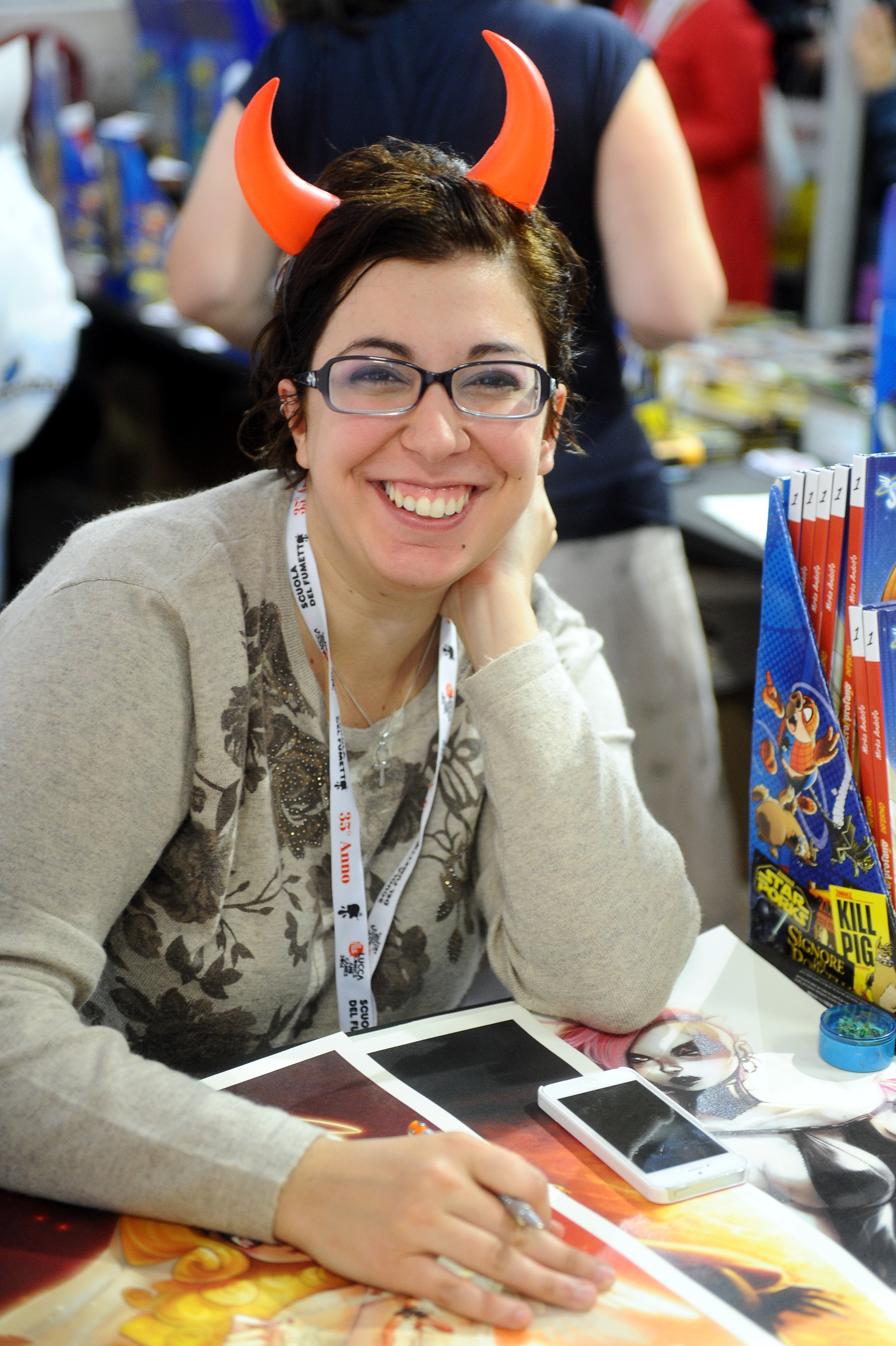
- Mirka Andolfo at Lucca Comics & Games in 2014
- Born: 17 June 1989 (age 37)
- Notable works: Sweet Paprika
- Awards: "Best International Book" Harvey Award 2021

Mirka Andolfo (born 17 June 1989) is an Italian comics artist from Naples and creator of the comic book Sweet Paprika which won the Harvey Award for Best International Book of 2021. Andolfo has worked with numerous major comic book publishers including DC Comics and BOOM! Studios, contributing to well-known titles such as Wonder Woman, The Amazing World of Gumball, and Ms. Marvel.

== Career ==
In 2015, Andolfo began working with DC comics. She has worked on a number of series, including Hex Wives, Wonder Woman and Harley Quinn.

Working with BOOM! Studios, Andolfo created the cover art for and contributed to the writing of The Amazing World of Gumball: Spring Break Smash in 2019. Matt Gagnon, Editor in Chief at BOOM! Studios, stated that she 'has distinguished herself as one of the most popular writers and artists in comics today.'

She has also worked with Marvel Studios as an artist. Andolfo illustrated the cover of the final issue of the Magnificent Ms. Marvel comic series in 2021.

Andolfo's 2021 comic book Sweet Paprika received international acclaim, winning the Harvey Award for Best International Book of 2021. The second volume in the series sold out at a distribution level one day after release. An animated project based on this comic series is being developed.

== Selected works ==
- Andolfo, Mirka (2016). Contronatura, Vol. 1: Il risveglio [Unnatural, Vol. 1: Awakening] (in Italian). Panini Comics. ISBN 9788891223586.
- Andolfo, Mirka (2017). Contronatura, Vol. 2: La caccia [Unnatural, Vol. 2: The Hunt] (in Italian). Panini Comics. ISBN 9781534310667.
- Andolfo, Mirka (2018). Contronatura, Vol. 3: La rinascita [Unnatural, Vol. 3: Rebirth] (in Italian). Panini Comics. ISBN 9781534313279.
- Andolfo, Mirka (2021). Sweet Paprika, Vol. 1 (in Italian). Star Comics. ISBN 9788822623720.
- Andolfo, Mirka (2021). Hot Paprika, Vol. 2 (in Italian). Star Comics. ISBN 9788822626912.
- Andolfo, Mirka (2022). Hot Paprika, Vol. 3 (in Italian). Star Comics. ISBN 9788822632883.

== See also ==
- List of comic creators
- List of women in comics
