= Ryan Sook =

American comic book artist

- Born: San Jose, California
- Areas: Cartoonist, Penciller, Inker, Colourist
- Notable works: Seven Soldiers: Zatanna; X-Factor

Ryan Sook is an American comic book artist, known for his work on books such as Seven Soldiers: Zatanna, X-Factor and The Spectre. His style has been compared to that of Mike Mignola, Adam Hughes, and Kevin Nowlan.

== Career ==
Sook's first professional work was in Challengers of the Unknown #15, published in 1998. For the next two years, he worked primarily on books for Dark Horse, including several stories set in the Buffy the Vampire Slayer universe, as well as two creator-owned projects in Dark Horse Presents: Witch's Son & Ragnok, with writer John Arcudi. He has also inked over Matt Smith's pencils in Lobster Johnson: The Killer in My Skull, a back-up story in Hellboy: Box Full of Evil #1.

In 2001, he earned critical and fan praise for his work on The Spectre for DC Comics. He left the book in 2002 to draw the first spin-off mini-series from Mike Mignola's Hellboy, BPRD: Hollow Earth.

From 2003 to 2010, Sook worked primarily for DC Comics focusing more on coverwork than interior sequential pages. His work in this time period includes: Arkham Asylum: Living Hell with Dan Slott, Hawkman with Justin Gray and Jimmy Palmiotti and Seven Soldiers: Zatanna with Grant Morrison and X-Factor with Peter David for Marvel. He has also worked on several books for Wildstorm.

In 2009, Sook garnered his highest critical praise to date for his work on the Kamandi story in Wednesday Comics, written by Dave Gibbons. For the twelve-part serialization, he handled all of the art chores including lettering.

Sook has been compared to Mike Mignola, Adam Hughes and Kevin Nowlan and has as well been influenced by them, but he also draws inspiration from Alphonse Mucha, JC Leyendecker and Norman Rockwell, among many others.

Sook created the poster for the TV series Agents of S.H.I.E.L.D. episode "S.O.S. Part 1".

== Bibliography ==
Interior comic work includes:

- Challengers of the Unknown vol. 3 #15: "Earth Came A-Walkin" (with Steven Grant, DC Comics, 1998)
- Tales of the Green Lantern: "Know Evil" (with John Ostrander, one-shot, DC Tangent, 1998)
- Buffy the Vampire Slayer (Dark Horse):
  - Spike & Dru #1-2 (with Christopher Golden and James Marsters, 1999)
  - Buffy Annual '99: "Bad Dog" (with Doug Petrie, co-feature, 1999)
  - TV Guide Nov. 20-26: "Angel: Point of Order" (with David Fury, News America Publications, 1999)
  - Ring of Fire (with Doug Petrie, graphic novel, 2000)
  - Reunion (with Jane Espenson, one-shot, 2002)
- Dark Horse Presents (anthology, Dark Horse):
  - "The Bookroom Horror" (with Mike Mignola, in #142, 1999)
  - "Ragnok" (with John Arcudi, in #147-149, 1999)
  - "Witch's Son" (with Scott Allie, in #156-157, 2000)
- Young Justice 80-Page Giant #1: "Nosferatu to You Too" (with Chuck Dixon, anthology, DC Comics, 1999)
- Superman: The Man of Tomorrow #15: "Day of Judgement: Heart of Hell" (with J. M. DeMatteis, DC Comics, 1999)
- Hellboy: Box Full of Evil: "Killer in My Skull" (inks on Matt Smith, written by Mike Mignola, one-shot, Maverick, 1999)
- Flinch #12: "Tin God" (with John Arcudi, anthology, Vertigo, 2000)
- The Spectre vol. 4 #1-4, 6, 8–9, 11-13 (with J. M. DeMatteis, DC Comics, 2001–2002)
- Dark Horse Extra #42-44: "B.P.R.D." (with Christopher Golden, Dark Horse, 2001–2002)
- B.P.R.D.: Hollow Earth #1-3 (with Mike Mignola, Christopher Golden and Tom Sniegoski, Dark Horse, 2002)
- Batman: Gotham Knights #41: "I'll Be Watching" (with Ed Brubaker, co-feature, DC Comics, 2003)
- Métal Hurlant #6: "3 on a Match" (with Robert Alan Jones, anthology, Les Humanoïdes Associés, 2003)
- Arkham Asylum: Living Hell #1-6 (with Dan Slott, DC Comics, 2003)
- Hawkman vol. 4 #28-31, 34 (with Justin Gray and Jimmy Palmiotti, DC Comics, 2004–2005)
- Spider-Man Unlimited vol. 3 #8: "Everything" (with Joshua Ortega, anthology, Marvel, 2005)
- Seven Soldiers: Zatanna #1-4 (with Grant Morrison, DC Comics, 2005)
- X-Factor vol. 3 #1-4 (with Peter David, Marvel, 2006)
- The Goon: Noir #1: "Big Ma's Hootenanny & Slack-Jaw Fighting" (with Steve Niles, anthology, Dark Horse, 2006)
- The Ultimates 2 Annual #2 (flashback sequences, with Charlie Huston and Mike Deodato, Jr., Marvel, 2006)
- Worldstorm #2: "Savant" (with Christos Gage, anthology, Wildstorm, 2007)
- DC Infinite Halloween Special: "The Speed of Life" (with Mark Waid, anthology one-shot, DC Comics, 2007)
- Countdown to Final Crisis #2: "The Origin of Darkseid" (with Scott Beatty, co-feature, DC Comics, 2008)
- First Born: Aftermath: "Crisis of Faith" (with Ron Marz, anthology one-shot, Top Cow, 2008)
- Final Crisis: Resist (with Greg Rucka and Marco Rudy, one-shot, DC Comics, 2008)
- The Darkness #75: "Absolute Darkness" (with Phil Hester, among other artists, Top Cow, 2009)
- Wednesday Comics #1-12: "Kamandi, the Last Boy on Earth!" (with Dave Gibbons, anthology, DC Comics, 2009)
- Batman: The Return of Bruce Wayne #5: "Masquerade" (with Grant Morrison and Pere Pérez, DC Comics, 2010)
- The Atom and Hawkman #46: "Bye Bye Birdie!" (with Geoff Johns, DC Comics, 2010)
- Action Comics (DC Comics):
  - "Life Support" (with Damon Lindelof, co-feature in #900, 2011)
  - "Anchiale" (with Max Landis, co-feature in vol. 2 Annual #1, 2012)
  - "The Oz Effect, Part 2" (with Dan Jurgens, in #988, 2017)
  - "Invisible Mafia, Parts 4-6" (with Brian Michael Bendis, in #1004-1006, 2018–2019)
- Rocketeer Adventures #3: "A Rocketeer Story" (script and art, anthology, IDW Publishing, 2011)
- Artifacts #10: "Origin: Glacier Stone" (with Ron Marz and Tom Feister, co-feature, Top Cow, 2011)
- T.H.U.N.D.E.R. Agents vol. 3 #5: "Never the Whole Truth" (with Nick Spencer and CAFU, DC Comics, 2011)
- Jonah Hex vol. 2 #70: "Weird Western" (with Justin Gray, Jimmy Palmiotti and Diego Olmos, DC Comics, 2011)
- Outlaw Territory Volume 3: "Heaven Sent" (script and art, with Alex Sheikman, anthology, Image, 2013)
- Ghost vol. 3 #1-2 (with Kelly Sue DeConnick, Chris Sebela and Drew Edward Johnson (#2), Dark Horse, 2013–2014)
- Peanuts: A Tribute to Charles M. Schulz: "Charlie Brown and Snoopy" (script and art, anthology, KaBOOM!, 2015)
- Batman Beyond: Rebirth: "Escaping the Grave, Part 1" (with Dan Jurgens, one-shot, DC Comics, 2016)
- Superman vol. 4 #15: "Multiplicity, Part 2" (with Peter Tomasi, among other artists, DC Comics, 2017)
- Inhumans Prime (with Al Ewing and Chris Allen, one-shot, Marvel, 2017)
- The Flash vol. 5 #25 (with Joshua Williamson, Carmine Di Giandomenico and Neil Googe, DC Comics, 2017)
- The Kamandi Challenge #12: "The Boundless Realm" (with Gail Simone and Jill Thompson, DC Comics, 2017)
- The Man of Steel vol. 2 #3 (with Brian Michael Bendis and Jason Fabok, DC Comics, 2018)
- The Unexpected vol. 2 #1: "Call of the Unknown, Part 1 – Punch First" (with Steve Orlando and Cary Nord, DC Comics, 2018)
- From Hell's Heart: "The Confidence-Man" (with Herman Melville and John Arcudi, anthology graphic novel, A Wave Blue World, 2019)
- Legion of Super-Heroes (with Brian Michael Bendis, DC Comics):
  - Millennium #2 (with Jim Cheung, Nicola Scott and Jeff Dekal, 2019)
  - Legion of Super-Heroes vol. 7 #1-ongoing (2020–...)

=== Covers only ===
- Angel #6 (Dark Horse, 2000)
- Buffy the Vampire Slayer #28 (Dark Horse, 2000)
- Buffy the Vampire Slayer: Spike & Dru #3 (Dark Horse, 2000)
- The Spectre vol. 4 #5, 7, 14, 18 (DC Comics, 2001–2002)
- Hellhounds #2 (Image, 2003)
- Hawkman vol. 4 #35-37, 39 (DC Comics, 2005)
- Birds of Prey #78 (DC Comics, 2005)
- Robotika #1 (Archaia Studios, 2005)
- X-Factor vol. 3 #5, 7-12 (Marvel, 2006–2007)
- Giant-Size Hulk #1 (Marvel, 2006)
- Friday the 13th #1-6 (Wildstorm, 2007)
- Star Wars: Rebellion #6-10, 14 (Dark Horse, 2007–2008)
- Nightwing #133-137 (DC Comics, 2007)
- The Flash: Fastest Man Alive #13 (DC Comics, 2007)
- Batman and the Outsiders vol. 2 #1 (DC Comics, 2007)
- Supernatural: Origins #3 (Wildstorm, 2007)
- Death of the New Gods #1 (DC Comics, 2007)
- Countdown Specials (DC Comics):
  - The Flash #1 (2007)
  - Jimmy Olsen #1 (2008)
  - The Atom #1-2 (2008)
  - The New Gods #1 (2008)
  - OMAC #1 (2008)
  - Eclipso #1 (2008)
  - Kamandi: The Last Boy on Earth #1 (2008)
- The Search for Ray Palmer — Superwoman/Batwoman #1 (DC Comics, 2008)
- DC Universe Specials (DC Comics):
  - Justice League of America #1 (2008)
  - Superman: Mongul #1 (2008)
  - Reign in Hell #1 (2008)
- Zorro vol. 6 #5-8 (Dynamite, 2008)
- Superman/Batman #51-52 (DC Comics, 2008)
- Superman's Pal, Jimmy Olsen Special #1 (DC Comics, 2008)
- Broken Trinity: Aftermath #1 (Top Cow, 2009)
- Dragon Prince #4 (Top Cow, 2009)
- Wildcats vol. 5 #13-18 (Wildstorm, 2009–2010)
- Blackest Night: Wonder Woman #1-3 (DC Comics, 2010)
- Superman: Last Stand of New Krypton #3 (DC Comics, 2010)
- JSA All-Stars vol. 2 #1 (DC Comics, 2010)
- The Magdalena vol. 3 #1-6 (Top Cow, 2010–2011)
- Brightest Day #7-8 (DC Comics, 2010)
- Artifacts #2 (Top Cow, 2010)
- Human Target vol. 3 #5 (DC Comics, 2010)
- Green Lantern vol. 4 #53, 57 (DC Comics, 2010)
- The Flash vol. 3 #2, 5 (DC Comics, 2010)
- Green Arrow vol. 4 #3 (DC Comics, 2010)
- Birds of Prey vol. 2 #4 (DC Comics, 2010)
- Green Lantern Corps vol. 2 #51 (DC Comics, 2010)
- Justice League of America vol. 2 #48 (DC Comics, 2010)
- Justice League: Generation Lost #7-8 (DC Comics, 2010)
- Justice Society of America vol. 3 #42 (DC Comics, 2010)
- Titans vol. 2 #26 (DC Comics, 2010)
- Victorian Undead II #1-5 (Wildstorm, 2011)
- B.P.R.D.: Hell on Earth (Dark Horse):
  - Gods #1-3 (2011)
  - Monsters #1-2 (2011)
  - Return of the Master #1-5 (2012)
  - The Reign of the Black Flame #4 (118) (2014)
- DC Universe Online: Legends #1 (DC Comics, 2011)
- Kirby: Genesis #0-8 (Dynamite, 2011–2012)
- DC Universe Presents #1-12, 0, 13-18 (DC Comics, 2011–2012)
- Justice League Dark #1-5, 7–12, 0, 13–14, Annual #1 (DC Comics, 2011–2012)
- Lord of the Jungle #1 (Dynamite, 2012)
- The Shadow vol. 7 #2 (Dynamite, 2012)
- Mystery in Space #1 (Vertigo, 2012)
- National Comics: Rose and Thorn #1 (DC Comics, 2012)
- Sword of Sorcery vol. 2 #1 (DC Comics, 2012)
- The Creep #2 (Dark Horse, 2012)
- The Red Team #1 (Dynamite, 2013)
- Before Watchmen: Ozymandias #6 (DC Comics, 2013)
- Essential Graphic Novels and Chronology #1-2 (DC Comics, 2013–2014)
- Ten Grand #1 (Joe's Comics, 2013)
- X-O Manowar vol. 3 #13 (Valiant, 2013)
- Dream Thief #2 (Dark Horse, 2013)
- Quantum and Woody vol. 2 #1-4 (Valiant, 2013)
- Worlds' Finest #12, 14 (DC Comics, 2013)
- Sidekick #1 (Joe's Comics, 2013)
- Trinity of Sin: Pandora #1-3 (DC Comics, 2013)
- DC One Million Omnibus hc (DC Comics, 2013)
- Hit #1-4 (Boom! Studios, 2013–2014)
- Protectors, Inc. #1 (Joe's Comics, 2013)
- Apocalypse Al #1 (Joe's Comics, 2014)
- He-Man and the Masters of the Universe vol. 2 #12 (DC Comics, 2014)
- The New 52: Futures End #0-48 (DC Comics, 2014–2015)
- Batman vol. 2 #34 (DC Comics, 2014)
- The Mighty tpb (Dark Horse, 2014)
- Rai vol. 2 #9-12 (Valiant, 2015)
- Sinestro #15 (DC Comics, 2015)
- Harley Quinn vol. 2 #21, 25 (inks only) (DC Comics, 2015–2016)
- The Amazing Spider-Man vol. 4 #1 (Marvel, 2015)
- The Vision vol. 3 #1 (Marvel, 2016)
- Superman vol. 3 #46 (with Spike Brandt) (DC Comics, 2016)
- Batman/Superman #26 (with Spike Brandt) (DC Comics, 2016)
- Superman: American Alien #1-7 (DC Comics, 2016)
- 100-Page Super Spectaculars (DC Comics):
  - Lois and Clark #1 (2016)
  - Darksied War #1 (2016)
  - Robin War #1 (2016)
  - Titans Hunt #1 (2016)
- Bloodshot Reborn #10-11 (Valiant, 2016)
- Kong of Skull Island #1 (Boom! Studios, 2016)
- 4001 A.D. #1-4 (Valiant, 2016)
- Black Panther vol. 5 #1 (Marvel, 2016)
- Uncanny X-Men vol. 4 #7 (Marvel, 2016)
- Squadron Supreme vol. 4 #5-6 (Marvel, 2016)
- Action Comics #957-960 (DC Comics, 2016)
- Betty and Veronica vol. 3 #1 (Archie Comics, 2016)
- Captain Marvel vol. 9 #9 (Marvel, 2016)
- Batman Beyond vol. 6 #1 (DC Comics, 2016)
- The Mighty Thor vol. 2 #15 (Marvel, 2017)
- The Unworthy Thor #3 (Marvel, 2017)
- Inhumans vs. X-Men #4 (Marvel, 2017)
- Grass Kings #3 (Boom! Studios, 2017)
- Future Quest #11 (Hanna-Barbera, 2017)
- Superman vol. 4 #22-25, 28–29, 33 (DC Comics, 2017)
- Sheena, Queen of the Jungle vol. 6 #0-1 (Dynamite, 2017)
- Batman: The Killing Joke reprint (DC Comics, 2017)
- Batman Day Special Edition #1 (DC Comics, 2017)
- Sacred Creatures #4 (Image, 2017)
- Black Panther #166 (Marvel, 2017)
- Deathstroke vol. 4 #21-29, Annual #1 (DC Comics, 2017–2018)
- Jim Henson's Labyrinth Special #2 (Archaia Studios, 2017)
- The Jetsons #6 (Hanna-Barbera, 2018)
- Nu Way #1 (Aspen, 2018)
- The Unexpected vol. 2 #2-3 (DC Comics, 2018)
- Heroes in Crisis #1-9 (DC Comics, 2018–2019)
- The Weatherman #5 (Image, 2018)
- The Flash vol. 5 #67 (DC Comics, 2019)
- Betty and Veronica vol. 4 #2 (Archie Comics, 2019)
- Justice League Dark vol. 2 #11 (DC Comics, 2019)
- Aquaman vol. 7 #50 (DC Comics, 2019)
- Detective Comics #1012 (DC Comics, 2019)
- DCeased: A Good Day to Die #1 (DC Comics, 2019)
- Legion of Super-Heroes: Millennium #1 (DC Comics, 2019)

=== Dungeons & Dragons game supplements ===
- Races of Eberron (2005)
- Five Nations (2005)
- An Adventurer's Guide to Eberron (2008)
