= Midnighter (2015 comic book) =

2015 comic book

- Cover of Midnighter #1. Art by ACO.

Publication information
- Publisher: DC Comics
- Schedule: Monthly
- Format: Ongoing series
- Genre: Superhero
- Publication date: June 2015 – May 2016
- No. of issues: 12

Creative team
- Created by: Warren Ellis; Bryan Hitch
- Written by: Steve Orlando
- Artist(s): ACO; Alec Morgan; David Messina; Stephen Mooney; Hugo Petrus
- Editor(s): Chris Conroy; Mark Doyle

Midnighter is an American comic book series published by DC Comics and written by Steve Orlando that ran for twelve issues (plus an un-numbered preview issue) from June 2015 to July 2016, featuring Midnighter as its protagonist. The series is also known as Midnighter (Volume 2) to differentiate itself from the character's previous series first published by WildStorm in 2006.

The release of Midnighter marked the first time a gay man was the protagonist in an ongoing series released by one of the "Big Two" comic book publishers (Marvel and DC Comics). Despite its underwhelming sales, Midnighter met with critical acclaim from professional critics, who praised among other things the series' fast-paced events and its portrayal of queer characters. The series appeared on numerous publications' end-of-year lists, and won "Best New Series" from Broken Frontier's 2015 awards program. Two Midnighter trade paperbacks were released in 2016, with seven and five issues each. A 6-issue miniseries sequel titled Midnighter and Apollo, also written by Orlando, ran from October 2016 to March 2017.

== Background ==
In September 2011, after the conclusion of the "Flashpoint" story arc wherein The Flash caused irreparable damage to the DC Universe's timestream in an attempt to prevent his mother's murder, DC merged the universe of its WildStorm imprint into a rebooted DC Universe in a relaunch known as The New 52. The character's first appearance in New 52 continuity was in a Stormwatch series released as part of the first wave of titles, and was a younger, single version of the character, replete with a new costume. Intended to be a significant part of this new universe, Stormwatch was a commercial and critical disappointment. Midnighter's characterization was criticized for being too distant of his WildStorm version and his costume, which included a chin spike, was so disliked that it was even referenced in the comic itself. After some relaunch attempts, Stormwatch was cancelled at issue #30.

== Publication history ==
The series was released as a part of "DC You", a marketing campaign to reinvigorate DC Comics' image. In May 2015, during the Convergence event, the publisher released digital sneak previews for several of its current and upcoming titles, all featuring a new short story. Titled "Perdition Pistol", the Midnighter preview appeared in the comic book Nightwing/Oracle #2. Series promotion included video interviews with Steve Orlando and Jase Peeples, entertainment editor of The Advocate, which also presented a short history of DC's LGBT characters to celebrate the release of the series and LGBT Pride Month. Midnighter's first issue was released in June, together with twenty other new DC Comics' titles. The series had a traditional publication, with a 20-page issue priced at $2.99 released monthly, and is codified in comics tracking as Midnighter Volume 2 to avoid confusion with the character's previous series.

"[Midnighter is] a version of Batman who's not Batman, and by pairing him with Dick Grayson, Batman's partner, we can highlight aspects of both characters that I think people haven't seen before. You get these two together and a thousand Freudian issues will instantly flow into a pretty awesome super hero fight".

— Tom King on Midnighter inclusion in Grayson series.

== Conception and development ==
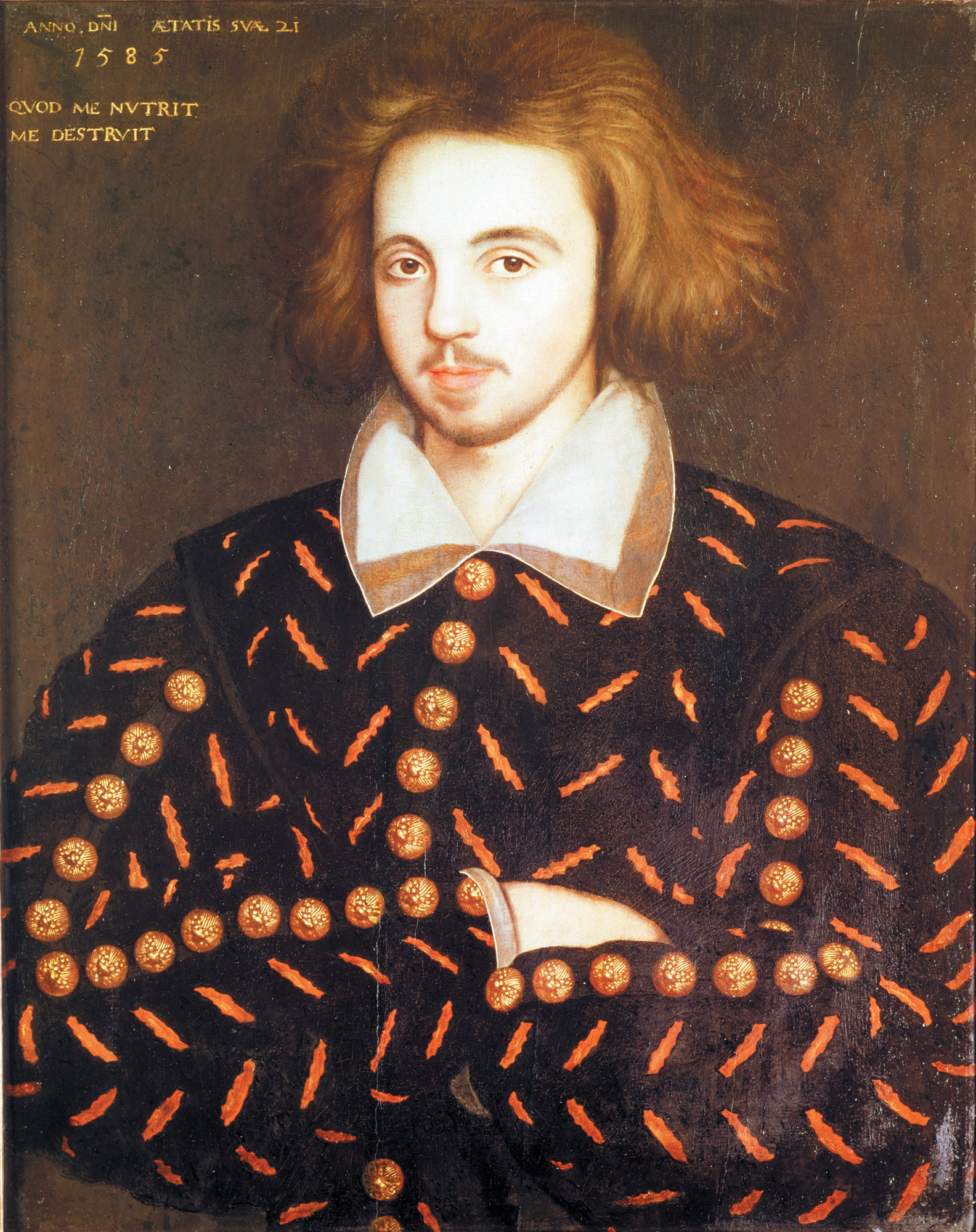
A portrait that purportedly displays Christopher Marlowe, described by Steve Orlando as a "writer, spy, queer man", and his main inspiration for Midnighter's characterization.

Midnighter represented both a new path and a return to the character's roots. It re-established his over-the-top acts of graphic violence and focused on his community work with everyday people, a similar scenario to the character's early days in the WildStorm Universe before joining Stormwatch. This Midnighter, however, is considerably younger than his WildStorm counterpart, and desires to have a more social life. According to writer Steve Orlando, he began writing Midnighter after Mark Doyle, Batman's editor, asked if he wanted to "pitch" any character. In an interview with Comic Vine, Orlando described Midnighter as:

...a fighter. That is a big part of where we're going in this book. People talk about how he's the "anti-Batman". I think he's very different. [...] Midnighter doesn't brood. People think he's like another mopey vigilante. Really, Midnighter loves his job. It just happens that his job is horrifying. Everybody knows who he is and what he does but he has to really find out how to do anything. [...] Midnighter doesn't know if he likes bagels. He doesn't know if he likes going to the movies. He doesn't know if he likes any of those things because all he's ever done is fight. He can do that. He's the best at that but there has to be other things if he's going to be a real person.

ACO, the title's main artist, brought to the comic a characteristic style, which features a large number of small panels to highlight the constant action scenes present in the story. He formed a collaboration with Hugo Petrus, who was co-credited as an inker for all of their issues and as a penciller for the last four issues. Stephen Mooney, who also pencilled Grayson, was the artist of issues #4 and 5.

The series had a close relationship with Grayson, a rebooted Dick Grayson solo comic. The characters Midnighter, Dick Grayson and Helena Bertinelli frequently feature in both comic books. Midnighter begins shortly after the end of his relationship with Andrew Pulaski, known as the hero Apollo. This decision, according to Orlando, was made to define Midnighter as a stand-alone character with his own sexual experiences with other people, while slowly building both characters' new interactions. The writer cites Christopher Marlowe, Orlando Cruz, Tab Hunter, John McClane, Emile Griffith, John Woo and Melvin Van Peebles as inspirations for the title character's personality.

== Plot ==
New in the city of Oakland, Midnighter arranges a date with a man called Jason. Suddenly, the restaurant where they are is invaded by Modoran mercenaries searching for three of their countrymen, making Midnighter reveal himself and beat them in a fight. Afterwards, Midnighter takes Jason to his apartment and installs a smartalk in him, in which Jason can contact him wherever he is. He also talks about his recent breakup with Andrew Pulaski (Apollo), saying he could not handle pretending to be a normal human and that Andrew is too good for him. Feeling too intimidated, Jason prefers to be just friends with Midnighter.

Called by The Gardener, Midnighter discovers the God Garden was robbed by a mysterious intruder who took several weapons and also a file containing his past memories before he was genetically enhanced. He starts a search to recover everything that was lost while beginning to date Matt, whom he met during the Modoran attack. Midnighter finds the first weapon, a powered necklace, with Marina Lucas, who was using it to avenge her husband's death by food poisoning. He finds another weapon while saving Amanda Riley, a little schoolgirl kidnapped by Multiplex, a villain in the employ of Mr. Rohmer, a corrupt businessman who sought the power of the God Garden. Rohmer reveals that he pretended to use Amanda as a guinea pig for a machine he built using God Garden technology. Beaten by Midnighter, he revealed that he acquired the tech from a Russian man named Noi Akakievitch.

Midnighter then abducts Dick Grayson to help him with his mission in Russia. There, they go after a secret inn administered by Guire Grando, an employee of Akakievitch. Grando takes homeless people from the streets and makes them go through a treatment with reprogrammed martian cells (originally from the God Garden) that transform them into vampire-like creatures, who are murdered for entertainment by the hooligan youngsters that frequent the inn. Midnighter and Grayson succeed in taking down the place, attracting Akakievitch's attention, who wants to have the Midnighter's computer brain technology. Then, Midnighter and Grayson go to his lair, where they fight and beat martian cells manipulated beasts, defeating Akakievitch, who reveals that he received the technology from a mysterious supplier.

Back home, Midnighter celebrates Thanksgiving for the first time with Matt, when they are attacked by Multiplex. Midnighter manages to defeat him, only to find out a few days later that Matt's father was also attacked. He and Matt go visit the man, who lives in a small town in Connecticut, and Midnighter begins investigating the place. While investigating at a nearby bar, he is attacked by a gang and during the fight, he discovers they are not humans, but rather androids created with God Garden technology. Midnighter then goes back to Matt's father's house and attacks him, revealing him to also be an android. Matt stabs Midnighter, revealing himself as the supervillain Prometheus and confessing to stealing the tech from the God Garden with the intention of taking down all superheroes, starting with Midnighter. They begin fighting and Prometheus reveals he downloaded all of Midnighter's origin file into his brain and destroyed the original, so if Midnighter kills him, all his early history would be destroyed. Midnighter does not mind and beats down Prometheus, who manages to escape severely injured. After that, Midnighter goes to take a drink with his friend Tony.

== Setting ==
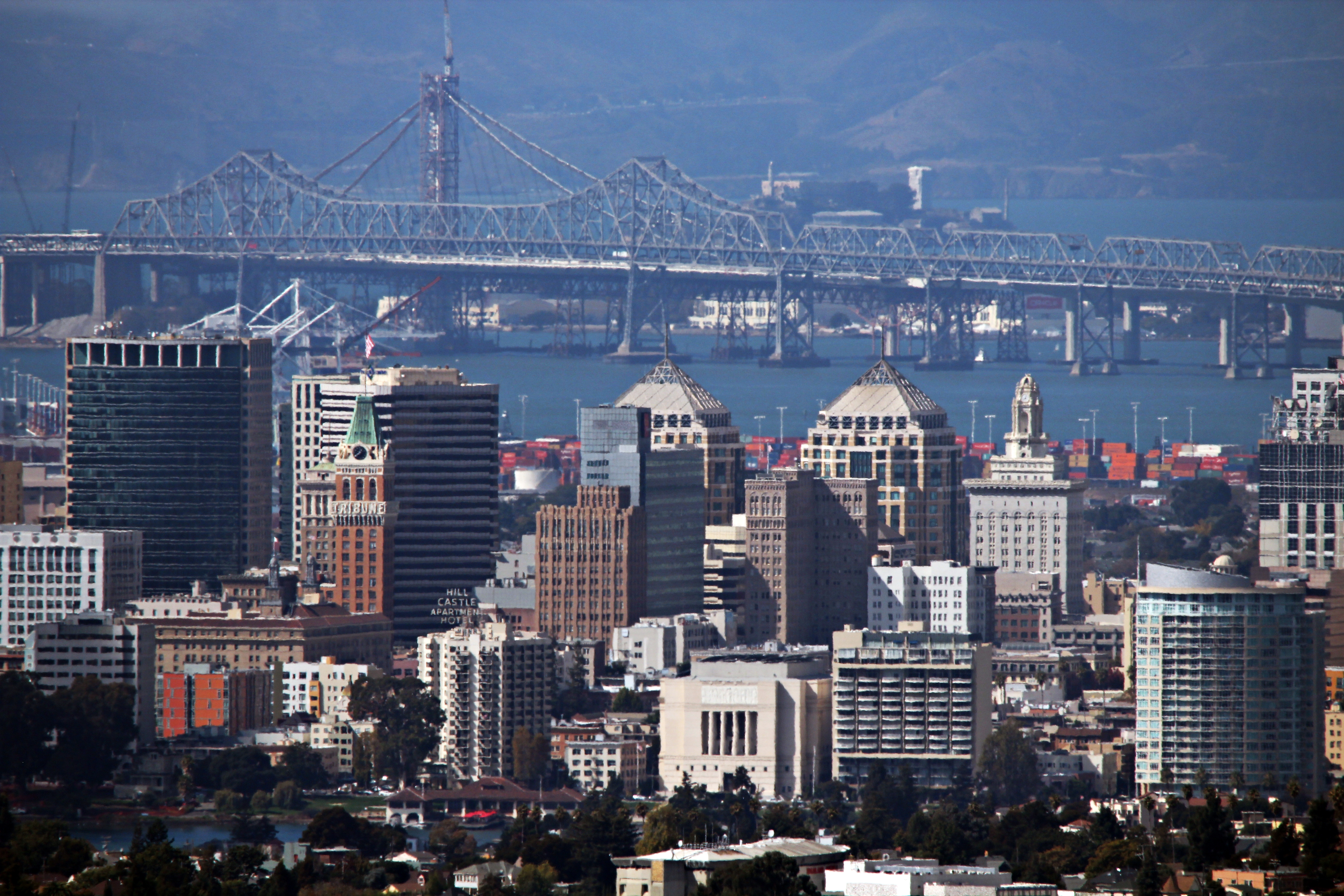
The city of Oakland (pictured) is a recurrent Midnighter setting.

Oakland, California and Boston, Massachusetts, are the cities where most of Midnighter's action happens. This breaks from DC tradition, as most DC stories take place in fictional DC locales. Thanks to the door technology, however, Midnighter can easily travel to any place in the world. Cities Bridgewater, Massachusetts, Rochester, New York, Richmond, California, Tacoma, Washington and Detroit, Michigan, as well as Florida Keys, Baffin Island (Canada) and the Darvaza gas crater (Turkmenistan) are also depicted through the series. Fictional Opal City is often shown during scenes with Apollo, who lives there. Porter, a fictional small town located in Connecticut, was also depicted, as well as another fictional country named Modora.

Much of the series takes place in Russia. Steve Orlando, himself a Russian culture admirer, explained the connection made between Midnighter and the place:

I think Russia is a great fit for Midnighter. If you've seen issue #1, you know he enjoys patronizing Russia. It's definitely something to acknowledge: that type of hypermasculinity, that type of discomfort toward the queer community there. But at the same time, I think it's a slippery slope to have him be an easy answer. You have a character who could just walk into the Kremlin and beat up Putin and that would be great, but it wouldn't solve any real problems. It might be cathartic for 20 pages, but then you've also kind of dumped on the real struggles that these people are having.

== Cancellation and DC Rebirth ==
"I've said it before, but working on Midnighter has been an honor. Getting to take a character that helped me when I was younger and boost the signal to a new generation has been an honor. And honestly, to beat the odds with a character people that people doubted [sic], or didn't know what to expect from, has been an honor".

— Steve Orlando considerations after Midnighter's finale.

In February 2016, DC Comics announced another relaunch, DC Rebirth, which mostly consisted of relaunches for their traditional titles like Batman, Superman and Wonder Woman. Midnighter and other DC You titles like Starfire and Black Canary did not have new series announced, and ended their runs at the twelfth issue, a decision criticized by some media outlets. Oliver Sava, writing for The A.V. Club, said that "it's unfortunate that [Midnighter] is heading to its conclusion when it feels like this creative team still has so much more to offer", adding that "DC hasn't done much to increase [Midnighter's] profile. [They] could have used this critical acclaim to promote the book". Jon Erik Christianson from Panels lamented the lack of representation that would happen with the cancellation of one of the few mainstream LGBT comic books.

Midnighter's first DC Rebirth appearance was in a flashback in Nightwing Rebirth #1, released in July 2016. DC announced a miniseries titled Midnighter and Apollo later that year.

== Reception ==
The announcement of Midnighter's release in February 2015 generated instant media interest due to the premise of the series being the first to prominently feature a gay superhero. The New York Times referred to Midnighter and the new wave of gay characters as ones who "zap stereotypes", calling it "a golden age for queer characters in comic books". Its writer, Gregory Schmidt, also expressed a belief that Midnighter's popularity "stems in part from efforts to make his sexual orientation just one aspect of his character".

=== Critical response ===
Upon release, Midnighter issues received widespread acclaim from comics critics. At the review aggregator website Comic Book Roundup, which assigns a weighted mean rating out of 10 to reviews from comics critics, the series received an average score of 8.2 based on 158 reviews. Reviewing the first issue, David Pepos from Newsarama gave it a maximum score, saying that "there aren't many books out there that I'd call perfect, but when you can see 10 steps ahead, it's perhaps not surprising that The Midnighter earns that praise. This book looks great, reads great, and is easily one of the best debuts from DC since the soft relaunch of Batgirl. If you've been skeptical about this character - and believe me, I was one of them - get ready for a spectacular change of heart". Keith Dooley of Multiversity Comics opined that "Midnighter is imperfect, has emotional issues, and yet has a hero's heart. Darkness and light concurrently mingle to create such a promising and exciting opening chapter to what has the potential to be something great". Writing for PopMatters, Matthew Fay felt the debut was a "reassuring and faithful reintroduction to the character" that "leaves open a lot of room for exploration".

"Probably the best matching of character and writer that we saw in comics in 2015. Steve Orlando came determined to take Midnighter and drag him straight to the top of DC's characters. And he succeeded with such strength and force that it's hard to remember a time when Midnighter wasn't a hugely important concept for the company. Orlando leans hard with a sharper sense of insight, cutting through the syndicated nature of superhero comics with aggressive verse. This was blunt-force comics, and some of the most daring and exciting work we've ever seen from DC".

— Midnighter introductory text from writer Steve Morris, published on Comic Book Resources' Top 100 Comics of 2015.

Critic Jesse Schedeen described Midnighter #3 in IGN positively as "great about exploring [Midnighter's] dichotomies". Jeff Ayers from Fanboys.Inc commended the Midnighter and Grayson pairing in Midnighter #5, writing that "Orlando is still crafting a compelling story of theft and intrigue within Midnighter's world". Matt Santori-Griffith of Comicosity reported Midnighter as "not just the gay hero I always wanted, but it's the comic I've always wanted, period. Plus it's the gay comic I've always wanted, with a world I recognize so deeply and naturally in the place I've been looking for it all my life. It's all of it and more, none subsumed or accelerated over the other, all in perfect harmony. Until it all falls apart and you reduce a forty-year-old homosexual to shock and awe on the floor. Yes, I am a sucker for Midnighter's charms. But admit it, so are you", in his review of the sixth issue.

Writing about Midnighter #8, Comic Vine's Tony 'G-Man' Guerrero believes that "with his attitude and action, [Midnighter is] not always the most likable character but Orlando succeeds in making readers care about it". Jideobi Odunze from Geeked Out Nation commended "the bond Midnighter has shared with others" in his Midnighter #10 review, feeling that "everything about [Midnighter] is right on the surface for the most part".

Midnighter #12, the series' final issue, received very positive reviews, being given maximum score from Josh McCullough at We The Nerdy ("It's been one of the smartest, emotionally hard hitting and action packed series DC have had in a long time"), and Comicosity's Mat Santori-Griffith ("Orlando, ACO, Petrus, and Fajardo have concluded this series with as much vigor and sensitivity as they carried throughout the previous 11 issues"). Jideobi Odunze at Geeked Out Nation, said that "Midnighter #12 was a marvelous ending to a series you would have to be crazy to have missed. The action, the humor, the everything you got from this series that you don't from all the rest from DC at this time. Not to mention the team-up with Spyral and Suicide Squad. This is how you do comics". Newsarama's C.K. Stewart in his review said that "[it] provides all the closure we needed for this stand-out series", and Comic Crusaders commented: "I've not been able to find a flaw with any issue of this one until now, and that flaw is simply...it's the last issue".

Less positive about the series, Jim Werner from Weird Science described it as "good at its best and awful for the rest of the time" in his reviews, calling Orlando's dialogue "close to laughable" and Midnighter "a tough sell as a character". Midnighter's constant artist changes during its run were also criticised by some critics. The Rainbow Hub's Sam Riedel wrote "it's better in my mind to establish a series' aesthetic before switching up art duties", while Jarrod Jones of Doom Rocket declared that "Midnighter is too good to settle for menial sequentials", and added: "For a book like this, DC would do well to roll out the red carpet for its best and brightest".

=== Accolades ===
Together with The Omega Men, Midnighter was the most acclaimed DC Comics book of 2015, appearing on more than twenty year-end lists of industry publications. The A.V. Club included it at number fifteen on its list of favorite comic books of 2015, stating that Midnighter has proven to be one of the laugh-out-loud funniest books, as well as one of the more emotionally weighty ones". io9 named it one of 2015's twenty best comic books, and commented that "Midnighter balances its brilliant superhero action with a frank, refreshing, and sex-positive look at its hero's life".

In 2015, Midnighter won a Broken Frontier Award for Best New Series, and was runner-up at the All-Comic Awards in a similar category, losing to We Can Never Go Home. The series also received a GLAAD Media Award nomination for Outstanding Comic Book, but lost to Lumberjanes.

=== Year-end lists ===
Year	Rank	Publication	List
2015	*	Salon	The Best Comics of 2015 (Mark Peters)
2015	4	The Hundreds	The Top 10 Comics of 2015 (Zach Norris)
2015	15	The A.V. Club	Favorite Ongoing and Serial Comics of 2015 (Caitlin Rosberg)
2015	*	Big Comic Page	The Best of 2015 (Martin Doyle)
2015	*	Tor.com	The Top Comic Books of 2015 (Alex Brown)
2015	*	Panels	Best Comics of 2015 (Swapna Krishna)
2015	*	io9	The 20 Best Comics and Graphic Novels of 2015 (James Whitbrook)
2015	8	Vulture	The 10 Best Comic Books of 2015 (Joshua Riviera)
2015	4	Polygon	The Top 10 Best Comics of 2015 (Susana Polo)
2015	17	Den of Geek	The Best Comics of 2015 (Jim Dandy)
2015	27	Comic Book Resources	Top 100 Comics of 2015
2015	*	The Court of Nerds	Favorite Comic Book Series of 2015 (Benjamin Raven)
2015	1	Newsarama	Best of Best Shots 2015 (C.K. Stewart)
2015	2	Newsarama	Best of Best Shots 2015 (David Pepose)
2015	*	ComiXology	Best New Series of 2015
2015	*	Guide Live	The Top 10 Comics of 2015 (Nicholas Friedman)
2015	*	The Coast	Top 10 Comics Released in 2015 (Kevin Hartford)
2015	*	Uproxx	The Fifteen Best New Comics Of 2015 (Dan Seitz)
2015	*	Comics Bastards	Best Ongoing Series of 2015
2015	*	Times Union	Best New Series of 2015 (Chad Burdette)
2015	5	Retcon Punch	Best Issues of 2015 (Midnighter #6)
2015	2	Retcon Punch	Best Series of 2015
2015	*	Geeked Out Nation	Best of 2015: New Series (Jess Camacho)
2015	*	Geeks OUT	Best Comic Books of 2015 (Ian Carlos)

* denotes an unordered list

=== Awards and nominations ===
Award	Category	Result
All-Comic Best of 2015 Awards	Best New Series	Runner-up
Broken Frontier 2015 Awards	Best New Series	Won
27th GLAAD Media Awards	Outstanding Comic Book	Nominated

== Collected editions ==
Covering its first seven issues and the sneak peek, Midnighter's first trade paperback was released on February 17, 2016. Midnighter: Out, titled after the series' first arc, has the same cover art of the debut comic book issue. The second trade paperback, titled Hard, was released on October 19, 2016 and has the same cover as Midnighter #12. Along with the series' second arc, Hard also collects issues #7–8 from Midnighter's previous WildStorm book and "Seoul Brothers", an Apollo and Midnighter story from Young Romance: The New 52 Valentine's Day Special #1.

Title	Material collected	Publication date	ISBN
Midnighter: Out (Volume 1)	Midnighter #1–7	February 17, 2016	978-1401259785
Midnighter: Hard (Volume 2)	Midnighter #8–12	October 19, 2016	978-1401264932

== Sales ==
Midnighter #1 debuted at number eighty-three on Diamond Comic Distributors best-selling comics ranking for June 2015, with 32,200 copies distributed, being the seventeenth best-selling DC comic book series debut in that month. It was the series' only issue to chart in the top 100, after Midnighter #2 had 61.5% less copies distributed next month, placing at number one hundred and twenty-nine.

=== Trade paperbacks ===
The trade Midnighter: Out had 1,678 copies accounted during its release month, February 2016, in Diamond distributed comic shops. It was placed at number forty-four on Diamond's trade paperbacks chart. Released in October of the same year, Midnighter: Hard had 1,232 copies distributed during its release month, placing at number ninety on the same chart. According to DC co-publisher, Dan DiDio, "[DC] has seen more life for Midnighter in the graphic novel area". He further explained: "With the Midnighter book in particular, [which had] a lot of great press, a lot of great reviews, that's where we've seen reviews really inform the sales on the graphic novel collection". Steve Orlando described Midnighter trade sales as "very, very nice with a huge amount of support from fans and readers".

Midnighter: Physical sales per issue (in thousands)

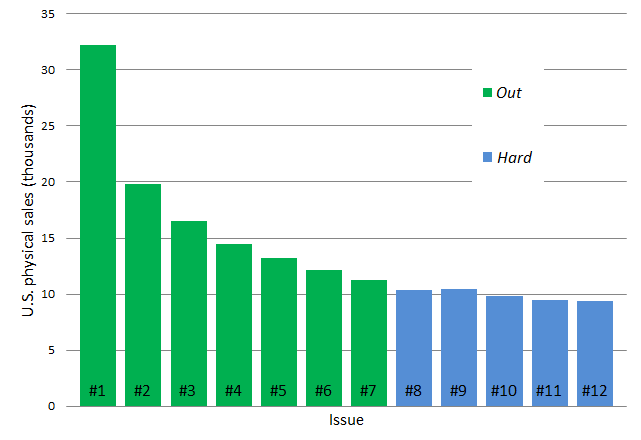

Story arc	#	Sales	Average	Diamond ranking
Out	1	32,200	17,099	83
Out	2	19,813	17,099	129
Out	3	16,563	17,099	132
Out	4	14,431	17,099	149
Out	5	13,235	17,099	152
Out	6	12,186	17,099	161
Out	7	11,267	17,099	191
Hard	8	10,408	9,886	174
Hard	9	10,428	9,886	172
Hard	10	9,803	9,886	176
Hard	11	9,435	9,886	194
Hard	12	9,354	9,886	197

== Credits and personnel ==
Credits and personnel adapted from the series issues.

- ACO – inks (#1; #3; #6–7; #9–12)*, cover (#1–2; #4–12), penciller (#1; #3; #6–7; #9–12)*
- Alex Antone – editor (#8–12)
- Gaetano Carlucci – inks (#8)
- Chris Conroy – editor (#1–12)*
- Jeremy Cox – colors (#5; #11)
- Mark Doyle – group editor (#1–12)*
- Romulo Fajardo, Jr. – colors (#1–10; #12)*, cover (#1–2; #4–12)
- Jared K. Fletcher – letters (#1–3)*
- Brittany Holzherr – assistant editor (#8–12)
- David Messina – penciller (#8)
- Stephen Mooney – artist (#4–5)
- Alec Morgan – artist (#2)
- Tom Napolitano – letters (#4–12)
- Steve Orlando – writer (#1–12)*
- Allen Passalaqua – colors (#2)
- Hugo Petrus – inks (#1; #3; #6–7; #9–12), penciller (#7; #9–12)
- Artyom Trakhanov – cover (#3)
- Dave Wielgosz – assistant editor (#1–7)*

* also credited for the sneak peek

== Midnighter and Apollo ==
DC Comics released a Midnighter sequel, Midnighter and Apollo, as a 6-issue miniseries, starting in October of the same year. Steve Orlando returned to writing, with interior art by Fernando Blanco and covers by ACO. Romulo Fajardo Jr. also returned as colorist. The series lasted until March 2017.
