= Terrible Means =

- Cover art
- Author: B. Mure
- Illustrator: B. Mure
- Cover artist: B. Mure
- Language: English
- Genre: Fantasy
- Published: 2018
- Publisher: Avery Hill Publishing
- Publication place: United Kingdom
- Media type: Graphic novel
- Pages: 100
- ISBN: 978-1-910395-43-1

Terrible Means is a graphic novel by B. Mure. Published in 2018 by Avery Hill Publishing, it serves as a prequel to Mure's graphic novella Ismyre (2017).

== Plot ==
Following the lizard Henriett, a disgraced botanist and professor, Terrible Means is set in the city of Ismyre, where everyone is anthropomorphized. Its events take place prior to Ismyre and explore the motives of that novella's eco-anarchist wizards and their tendencies.

In Ismyre, the city's wealthy flaunt "crystals that allow for the effects of the everyday magic of the land to be greatly accentuated, creating powerful illusions and enhancing spells". These crystals, however, causes a natural imbalance and negative ecological effects. After finding something troubling in her field studies, she travels to warn the city's Prime Minister and council of the imbalance, though fails in her attempt after she is blamed for a magical explosion that takes place on her visit. She later meets Emlyn, a young magician, who is the one actually responsible. Emlyn defends her actions as acts of protest against local rivers turning black. Henriett and Emlyn then work to uncover the aforementioned imbalance. They are joined by a group including ex-academics and inhabitants of Ismyre's surrounding villages.

== Development and publication ==
B. Mure's Ismyre was well-received following its 2017 release. The following March, its publisher (Avery Hill) announced Terrible Means, a graphic novel serving as a prequel to Ismyre. Released in October 2018, Terrible Means is 100 pages and illustrated in watercolor.

After Terrible Means was released, the Ismyre series was continued in The Tower in the Sea and Methods of Dyeing. Mure stated he worked on Terrible Means after Ismyre, explaining that he has worked on the series' installments in their publication order, though "sometimes stuff escapes while I'm doing one book that doesn't fit in it, or alludes to something else".

== Style and themes ==
Mure used watercolor for Terrible Means. The Comics Journal noted that Mure "sets up nice visual contrasts between scenes in the city, which are full of bright pinks and purples and other jewel-y tones, and the washed out, more natural colors of the country".

Mure has stated that "It is not a surprise to anyone who has spent a small amount of time with me that I think capitalism, colonialism and all its associated prejudices and outcomes are ruinous". Themes in Terrible Means, as well as the Ismyre series as a whole indeed include ecology, capitalism, corruption, and climate crisis, with reviewers noting a necessity to speak out against environmental exploitation as a core message in the prequel. Calling Terrible Means a "contemporary tale", Broken Frontier's Andy Oliver elaborated that it has a "strong allegorical throughline as relevant to the news stories of today as it is to the fantasy milieu; the privileged few prospering to the detriment of the many as the themes of ecological imbalance echo broader societal disparity".

== Reception ==
Reviewers of Terrible Means noted the novel's ecological themes, focus on character writing, and watercolor. Publishers Weekly described it as "a fairy tale call to arms", with the magazine opining positively of Mure's art, writing "his menagerie of expressive characters bursts with charm, but the real star here is the coloring. An ever-changing watercolor wash whirls across every panel, imbuing the world's thorny emerald vines and brilliant blue crystals with vibrant magic". Comparing Terrible Means to Ismyre, Andy Oliver of Broken Frontier described the former as a "subtler character piece with protagonists who are sympathetic because their flaws embody their humanity". Oliver went on to write that "Mure's scratchy art and idiosyncratic panel constructions are as much a delight here as they were in" Ismyre, praising Mure's use of color as a "wonderful visual contradiction, simultaneously subdued and measured and yet so, so striking and dynamic". John Seven of Comics Beat wrote that Terrible Means featured "bright, splashy, giddy color work".

In contrast, Frank Plowright of Slings & Arrows gave the graphic novel a middling review, writing that it "meanders slightly, sometimes lingers in the wrong places and the nicer cast members are prone to leaps of faith that prove correct". Plowright was also critical of its "basic art", calling it "cramped, untidy, with minimum capacity to convey an emotional state, and given little chance to show its finer qualities due to the eccentricity of the colouring". H. W. Thurston of The Comics Journal also gave Terrible Means a lukewarm review. Thurston wrote that Terrible Means "has a gentle, vibrant sincerity, and welcome visual originality" and called it a "noticeable improvement, craftwise, over" Ismyre, stating the prequel had "a much stronger command of image and pace". Thurston however found issue with the novel, opining that "it occupies this strange middle ground between being a children's book and being a rich, longform fantasy story, but has none of the benefits of either".
