= Flowers for Rhino =

2001 Spider-Man comic story

- Cover of Spider-Man's Tangled Web 5 (Oct, 20), art by Duncan Fegredo
- Publisher: Marvel Comics
- Publication date: October – November 2001
- Genre: Superhero
- Title(s): Spider-Man's Tangled Web #5–6
- Main character(s): Spider-Man; Rhino

Creative team
- Writer: Peter Milligan
- Artist: Duncan Fegredo
- Letterer(s): Comicraft; Jimmy Betancourt
- Colorist: Steve Buccellato
- Spider-Man's Tangled Web, Volume 1: ISBN 0-7851-0803-3
- The Best of Spider-Man, Volume 1: ISBN 0-7851-0900-5

"Flowers for Rhino" is a Spider-Man story by Peter Milligan and Duncan Fegredo. Published in 2001, it is a pastiche of the science fiction story Flowers for Algernon. "Flowers for Rhino" appeared in Spider-Man's Tangled Web #5–6.

== Plot summary ==
Rhino, a brutish and dimwitted enemy of Spider-Man, suffers a mid-life crisis after he attempts to rescue Stella, the beautiful daughter of a mob boss, who coldly informs him after he is hired as a full-time bodyguard on the grounds that he is too stupid to be a serious romantic or business threat. Recalling a recent meeting with the doctors who created his latest suit, he undergoes a brain operation that turns him into a super genius.

With his new intellect, he quickly demonstrates a change in his usual methods, allowing him to defeat Spider-Man, subsequently running away with Stella to start his own crime organization. With his new intellect, he writes a novel, gets a restraining order that prevents Spider-Man from attacking him, sets up a crime syndicate (with the aid of such other criminals as the Mad Thinker, after breaking them out of prison), and even rewrites Hamlet. Unfortunately, it has the side effect of making the subject so intelligent that he is no longer able to fully enjoy life, with Rhino driving Stella away because he finds her too dimwitted to attract his attention. Finally reaching a point where he finds no real meaning in life, Rhino hands Spider-Man, having deduced his identity via an equation he developed that allows him to calculate the secret identities of superheroes, information with which he can bring down Rhino's crime empire. He nearly commits suicide, but at the last minute he comes up with a means of reversing the original operation and restoring his original intellect, even requesting that he be made "a bit stupider than before". He is soon restored to his former stupid but happy self, delightedly crashing through walls.

== Reception ==
Randy Lander from the fourthrail.com stated the mix of the classic Flowers for Algernon was "funny and clever". Fegredo's artwork was praised although he said Buccellato's heavy colouring detracted from the story.

== Collected editions ==
The story has been collected in a number of individual volumes:

- Spider-Man's Tangled Web, Volume 1 (collects Spider-Man's Tangled Web #1-6, 144 pages, Marvel, November 2001, ISBN 0-7851-0803-3)
- The Best of Spider-Man, Volume 1 (collects The Amazing Spider-Man #30-36, Peter Parker: Spider-Man #36, Spider-Man's Tangled Web #4-6 and Ultimate Marvel Team-Up #6-8, 336 pages, Marvel, 2003, ISBN 0-7851-0900-5)
