= Steve Orlando =

American comic book writer

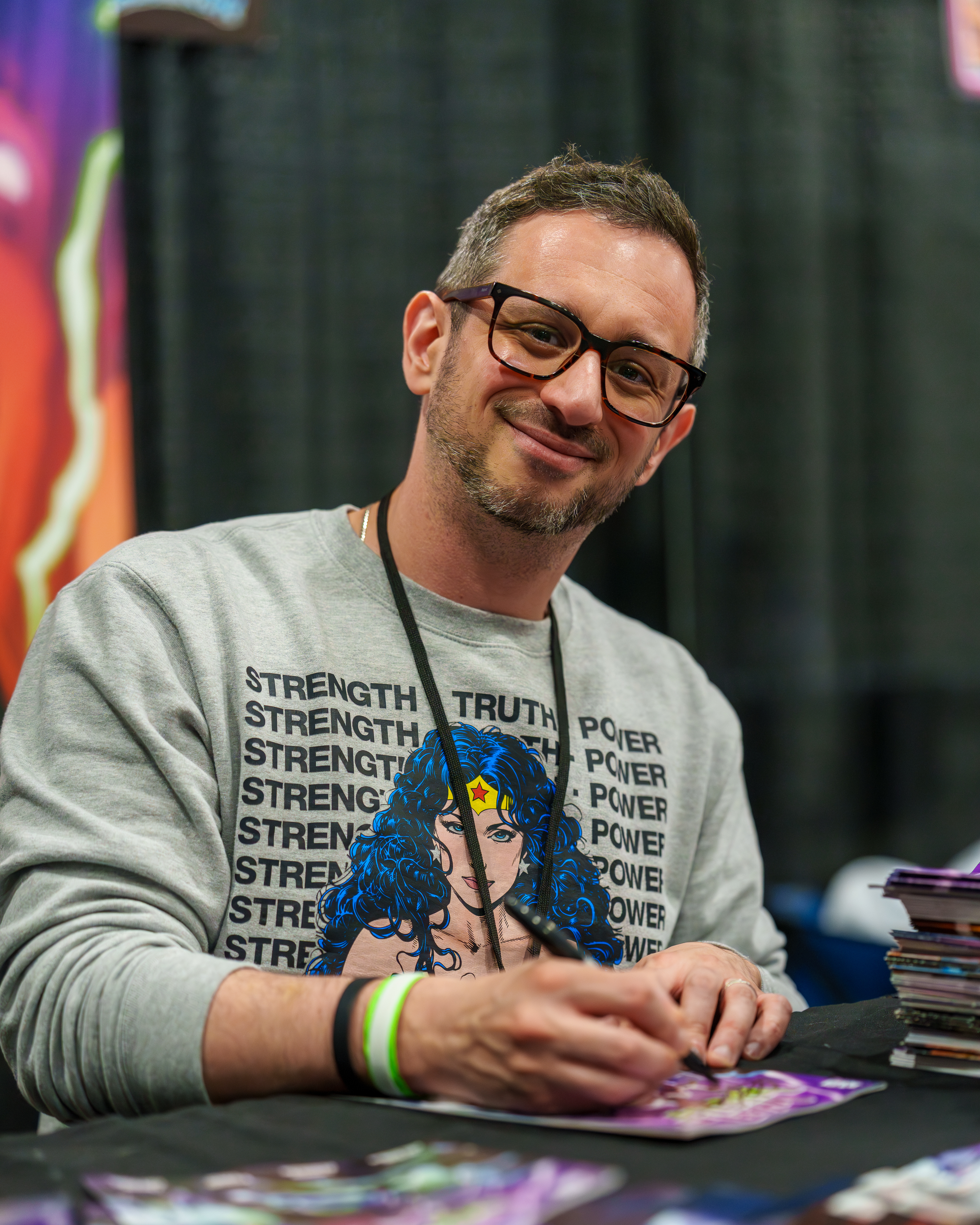
- Orlando at GalaxyCon Nashville in 2026
- Areas: Writer; Editor
- Notable works: Midnighter; Martian Manhunter; Batman and Robin Eternal; Gotham City Monsters; Supergirl: Rebirth; Justice League of America; Green Lanterns; Spider-Man 2099: Exodus; Spider-Man 2099: Dark Genesis; Marauders; Annihilation 2099; Scarlet Witch; Scarlet Witch & Quicksilver; Curse of the Man-Thing

Steve Orlando is an American comic book writer, known for his work for DC Comics writing characters such as Batman, Martian Manhunter, and Wonder Woman, and two series starring Midnighter, which were nominated for a GLAAD Media Award.

== Early life ==
Steve Orlando attended Hamilton College in Clinton, where he studied Russian language and creative writing, obtaining a degree in the latter.

== Career ==
Beginning in 2000, Orlando began attending conventions seeking work in the comics industry. Between 2000 and 2014, with the release of his first longform work, Undertow, he created and revised comics under the mentorship of Man of Action Studios and Vertigo editor Will Dennis, as well as publishing with 215 Ink, Poseur Ink, and working as a submissions editor for Leagues of Talent.

In 2009 and 2014, Orlando was part of the Outlaw Territory Anthology series at Image Comics, Volume 3 of which was nominated for Eisner and Harvey Awards. After releasing shorts for DC/Vertigo's Mystery in Space and CMYK:Yellow Anthologies, he released Undertow at Image Comics in 2014, followed by the original graphic novel Virgil in 2015.

In 2015, Orlando launched Midnighter for DC Comics as part of the DC You publishing initiative, with art by ACO. Midnighter named by io9 as one of the "20 Best Comics of 2015" and "The Best Portrayal of a Gay Superhero in Mainstream Comics." This series was followed by Midnighter and Apollo, celebrated for "...Just [having] the Realest Romantic Relationship in Superhero Comics." Following Midnighter, Orlando was part of the Batman and Robin Eternal weekly event series, before launching both Supergirl and Justice League of America as part of the DC Rebirth initiative.

In 2017 Orlando co-wrote the Batman/Shadow crossover event for DC Comics, followed by writing the sequel Shadow/Batman himself for Dynamite Entertainment. He was part of both the Kamandi Challenge, and Kirby 100 publishing events celebrating the 100th birthday of Jack Kirby.

In 2018, he worked with Gerard Way on the Milk Wars series, a crossover between the DC Universe and the DC Young Animal characters. In June 2018, he and Ryan Sook began writing The Unexpected, as part of the New Age of DC Heroes Publishing initiative.

Also in 2018, Orlando guest-wrote DC's monthly Wonder Woman, Issues 51–55, with Issue 51 named as "one of the best standalone issues of Wonder Woman [the reviewer's] ever read, ever, and it tells a compelling story that speaks directly to the core of a classic and long-tenured character yet is also strikingly-relevant for 2018." and "Wonder Woman #51 is probably one of the best Wonder Woman single issues [the reviewer's] read in a long long time." In June 2019, Orlando returned for Wonder Woman Issue 73. In October 2019, Orlando returned to Wonder Woman, with the departure of G. Willow Wilson. In January 2020, his work with Jesus Merino opened the anniversary 750th issue of Wonder Woman, kicking off the return of classic numbering for the series.

Late 2018 saw the launch of Martian Manhunter, a 12-issue maxiseries and Orlando's third collaboration with Riley Rossmo. Its December-debuting first issue was named as one of 2018's best by Tor Books. Upon release, Forrest Hollingsworth of Adventures in Poor Taste wrote "Martian Manhunter's character redefining debut is a complete and total success - both narratively and artistically it exceeds all expectations and delivers something both alien and welcoming."

Orlando has written for Hello Mr., with a short story illustrated by Sina Grace, in the magazine's first release in comic book format. In 2019, he provided the English Language script for Mirka Andolfo's MERCY live action series trailer.

In September 2022, it was announced Orlando would be writing Scarlet Witch in January 2023, with Sara Pichelli providing the art.

== Personal life ==
Orlando is a bisexual Jew.

== Bibliography ==
=== Marvel Comics ===
- Avengers: Curse of the Man-Thing Vol. 1 #1 (2021)
- Heroes Reborn: Magneto and the Mutant Vol. 1 #1 (2021)
- King in Black: Planet of the Symbiotes Vol. 1 #3 (2021)
- Marvel 2099:
  - Annihilation 2099 #1–5 (2024)
  - Conquest 2099 #1–5 (2024)
  - Miguel O'Hara - Spider-Man 2099 #1–5 (2024)
  - Spider-Man 2099: Dark Genesis #1–5 (2023)
  - Spider-Man 2099: Exodus #1–5 (2022)
  - Spider-Man 2099: Exodus Alpha (2022)
  - Spider-Man 2099: Exodus Omega (2022)
  - The End 2099 #1–5 (2025–2026)
- Scarlet Witch & Quicksilver Vol. 1 #1-4 (2024)
- Scarlet Witch:
  - Vision and the Scarlet Witch Vol. 3 #1-5 (2025)
  - Scarlet Witch Annual #1 (2023)
  - Scarlet Witch Vol. 3 #1-10 (2023)
  - Scarlet Witch Vol. 4 #1-10 (2024–2025)
  - Sorcerer Supreme #1- (2025)
- Spider-Man:
  - Spider-Man: Curse of the Man-Thing Vol. 1 #1 (2021)
  - Spider-Man: Meals to Astonish #1 (2026)
- X-Men:
  - Marauders Annual #1, Vol. 2 #1-12 (2022–2023)
  - X-Men: Curse of the Man-Thing Vol. 1 #1 (2021).

=== DC Comics ===
- American Vampire Anthology Vol. 1 #2 (2016)
- Aquaman
  - Aquaman Deep Dives Vol. 1 #1,#3,#5-#7 (2020)
  - Aquaman Giant Vol. 1 #1,#3,#4 (2020)
- Batman
  - Batman and Robin Eternal #4–5 (with James Tynion IV, Scott Snyder, 2015–2016)
  - Batman: Night of the Monster Men
    - Batman Vol. 3 #7–8 (with Tom King, 2016)
    - Detective Comics #941–942 (with James Tynion IV, 2016)
    - Nightwing Vol. 4 #5–6 (with Tim Seeley, 2016)
  - Batman Annual Vol. 3 #1 (2017)
  - Batman Beyond Vol. 6 #12 (with Vita Ayala, 2017)
  - Batman Secret Files Vol. 2 #2 (2019)
  - Batman/The Shadow #1–6 (with Scott Snyder, 2017)
  - Gotham Academy #18 (2016)
  - Gotham City Monsters #1–6 (2019–2020)
- DC Nuclear Winter Special (2018)
- DC Rebirth Holiday Special (2017)
- DC's Crimes of Passion Vol 1 #1 (2020)
- Doom Patrol: Weight of Worlds #3 (with Gerard Way and Jeremy Lambert, 2019)
- Electric Warriors #1–6 (2018–2019)
- Justice League:
  - Justice League: Darkseid War: Shazam! (2016)
  - Justice League of America: Killer Frost Rebirth (with Jody Houser, 2017)
  - Justice League of America: The Atom Rebirth (2017)
  - Justice League of America: The Ray Rebirth (2017)
  - Justice League of America: Vixen Rebirth (with Jody Houser, 2017)
  - Justice League of America Vol. 5 #0–29 (2017–2018)
- Kirby 100: The Sandman Special (2017)
- Martian Manhunter:
  - Martian Manhunter / Marvin the Martian (with Frank J. Barbiere, 2017)
  - Martian Manhunter Vol. 5 #1–12 (2018–2020)
- Midnighter
  - Midnighter and Apollo #1–6 (2016–2017)
  - Midnighter Vol. 2 #1–12 (2015–2016)
- Milk Wars:
  - Milk Wars: Doom Patrol/JLA (with Gerard Way, 2018)
  - Milk Wars: JLA/Doom Patrol (with Gerard Way, 2018)
- Mystery in Space Vol. 3 #1 (2012)
- Superman:
  - Supergirl: Rebirth (2016)
  - Supergirl Vol. 7 #1–20 (with Jody Houser: #15–18, 20), (with Vita Ayala: #19), 2016–2018)
  - Superman Giant #11, #14 (2019)
- Tales from the Dark Multiverse: Crisis on Infinite Earths (2020)
- The Kamandi Challenge #6 (2017)
- Vertigo Quarterly: Yellow (2014)
- Wonder Woman:
  - Wonder Woman Annual Vol. 5 #3–#4 (2019,2020)
  - Wonder Woman Vol. 1 #750–758 (2020)
  - Wonder Woman Vol. 5 #51–#55, #73, #82-#83 (2018–2020)
- The Unexpected Vol. 2 #1–8 (2018)
- Young Monsters in Love Vol 1 #1(2018)

=== TKO Studios ===
- The Pull (2020)

=== Aftershock Comics ===
- Bulls of Beacon Hill (2023)
- Dead Kings #1–5 (2018–2019)
- Kill a Man (with Phillip Kennedy Johnson, 2020)
- Project Patron (with Phillip Kennedy Johnson, 2021)
- S.O.S. Save Our Shops (2020)

=== Heavy Metal ===
- Starward (2021)
- String Theory (2021)

=== 215 Ink ===
- The Kitchen Witch (2021)

=== Boom Studios ===
- Mighty Morphin' Power Rangers #0–12 "Bulk and Skull" (2015–2016)
- Namesake #1–4 (2017)

=== Image Comics ===
- Commanders in Crisis #1–12 (2020–2021)
- Crude #1–6 (2018)
- Mirka Andolfo's Sweet Paprika: Open for Business #1-5 (2024–2025)
- Outlaw Territory Vol. 1 #1 (2009)
- Outlaw Territory Vol. 3 #1 (2013)
- Undertow #1–6 (2014)
- Virgil (2015)

=== Dynamite Entertainment ===
- The Shadow/Batman #1–6 (2017–2018)

=== IDW Publishing ===
- Love is Love (2017)
- Transformers: King Grimlock (2021)

=== Hello Mr. ===
- Hello Mr. #7 (2017)

=== House Spirit Press ===
- The Liberator (2018)

=== Poseur Ink ===
- Side B: A Music Lover's Anthology (2009)

== Awards and nominations ==
=== Awards ===
- 2015 Broken Frontier Award for Best New Series for Midnighter.
- 2018 Tor Books Best Comics of 2018 for Martian Manhunter.

=== Nominations ===
- 2017 GLAAD Media Award for Outstanding Comic Book for Midnighter/Midnighter and Apollo
- 2015 All-Comic Award for Best New Series for Midnighter.
- 2014 Eisner Award for Best Anthology for Outlaw Territory Volume 3
- 2014 Harvey Award for Best Anthology for Outlaw Territory Volume 3
