= Rhino (character) =

Fictional character appearing in Marvel Comics

- The Rhino as depicted in Daughters of the Dragon #1 (March 2006). Art by Khari Evans.

Publication information
- Publisher: Marvel Comics
- First appearance: The Amazing Spider-Man #41 (October 1966)
- Created by: Stan Lee; John Romita Sr.

In-story information
- Alter ego: Aleksei Mikhailovich Sytsevich
- Species: Human mutate
- Place of origin: Russia
- Team affiliations: Sinister Six; Sinister Syndicate; Secret Defenders; Klaw's Army; Legion Accursed; Emissaries of Evil; S.H.I.E.L.D. Savage Six; Thunderbolts
- Notable aliases: Alex O'Hirn
- Abilities: Superhuman strength, speed, and stamina, durability; Razor-sharp horns

The Rhino (Aleksei Sytsevich; Russian: Алексей Сицевич) is a supervillain appearing in American comic books published by Marvel Comics. Created by writer Stan Lee and artist John Romita Sr., he first appeared in The Amazing Spider-Man #41 (cover dated October 1966). The character is a Russian thug who underwent an experimental procedure that gave him an artificial skin covering and superhuman strength. Rebelling against the scientists responsible for his transformation, Rhino used his newfound powers to become a successful criminal, and soon clashed with superheroes like Spider-Man and the Hulk. The character is typically portrayed as a dimwitted brute, capable of great destruction, but ultimately easily deceived.

One of Spider-Man's most prominent adversaries, the Rhino has been adapted into various forms of media since his original debut during the Silver Age of Comic Books, including animated television series and video games. He has also featured in Marvel merchandise such as action figures and trading cards. In live-action, Paul Giamatti played a version of Aleksei Sytsevich who uses a rhinoceros-themed battle armor, similar to the character's Ultimate Marvel incarnation, in the 2014 film The Amazing Spider-Man 2. Another version appeared in the 2024 Sony's Spider-Man Universe film Kraven the Hunter, played by Alessandro Nivola.

== Publication history ==
Described by writer Mike Conroy as "famously one of Spider-Man's dimmest villains", the Rhino debuted in The Amazing Spider-Man #41–43 (Oct.–Dec. 1966) as a thug for hire working for an Eastern Bloc country. He volunteers to participate in an experiment that bonds a super-strong polymer to his skin, as well as augmenting his strength and speed. The character returned in The Incredible Hulk (vol. 2) #104 (June 1968), and although he apparently died at the end of the story, he was revived in The Incredible Hulk (vol. 2) #124 (Feb. 1970), becoming a perennial opponent of both Spider-Man and the Hulk.

The character achieved significant exposure in the 1980s and 1990s, appearing in both a solo capacity and as a villain for hire in over 12 titles. Significant appearances included starring in the limited series Deadly Foes of Spider-Man #1–4 (May–Aug. 1991); the "Flowers for Rhino" storyline in Spider-Man's Tangled Web #5–6 (Oct.–Nov. 2001), which is told from the character's perspective; and Punisher War Journal (vol. 2) #13–15 (Jan.–March 2008), in which Rhino begins to rethink his lifestyle. He has also been a member of multiple supervillain teams, including the Emissaries of Evil, the Sinister Syndicate, and the Sinister Six.

== Fictional character biography ==
=== Origin and early villainy ===
Aleksei Sytsevich is a low-ranking member of the Russian mafia who willingly undergoes a series of chemical and radiation treatments meant to give him an artificial skin covering that grants superhuman strength. After successfully completing the treatment, Sytsevich rebels against the Eastern Bloc agents who gave him these powers and sought to use him as a weapon, destroying their laboratory. He is subsequently hired to kidnap Colonel John Jameson and obtain the extraterrestrial spores to which Jameson is exposed during a space mission, but Sytsevich is defeated by the superhero Spider-Man and taken to prison.

After serving his sentence, the Rhino is approached by the same scientists for more augmentation. This time, they use the same gamma radiation that granted the Hulk his abilities to further increase the Rhino's strength. They also equip him with a more durable, acid-proof suit that further increases his abilities. As repayment, the Rhino agrees to find and kidnap Bruce Banner, the Hulk's human alter ego, for his knowledge of gamma radiation. Despite the Rhino's training and equipment, he is easily defeated by the Hulk, who places him in a coma.

Months later, the Rhino is revived by the Leader, who plans to interrupt Banner's wedding to Betty Ross. The Leader intends to transform Banner into the Hulk, and wants to be protected by the Rhino from the ensuing rampage. At the wedding, the Rhino betrays the Leader and attacks Banner the moment he transforms. In the resulting chaos, the Rhino is once again comatose, and the Leader briefly takes mental control of Sytsevich's body to combat the Hulk. The Leader abandons the Rhino and the Hulk on Counter-Earth, but they later return home in the Leader's rocket, which crashes on arrival.

The Rhino's first collaboration with other villains occurs when he and the Abomination activate a gamma bomb at the Hulkbuster base in an attempt to destroy the Hulk. Although this attempt fails, Egghead recruits the Rhino for his supervillain team, the Emissaries of Evil, where he is paired with Solarr in search of a rare jewel. Rhino and Solarr are defeated by the Defenders, Doctor Strange, and Doc Samson.

Samson takes the Rhino to Project Pegasus, where he is part of a failed prison break involving Moonstone, Blackout, and Electro. While being transferred to another facility, the Miracle Man attempts to free the Rhino, who wants to stay in Project Pegasus for medical treatment. The rocket crash permanently affixes the Rhino's costume to his body, and he wants it separated. He and the Thing successfully stop Miracle Man. The Rhino is then taken to a medical facility within Project Pegasus.

When the treatments fail to return the Rhino to normal, he escapes Project Pegasus and joins the Sinister Syndicate, fighting Spider-Man on multiple occasions. After the team falls apart, the Rhino is hired by the Kingpin under the belief that he can raise the money for more surgery. When he hears the Kingpin tell a group of scientists not to remove the Rhino suit, Sytsevich kidnaps one of their children until they complete the procedure. Sytsevich requests a removable suit from Justin Hammer, allowing him to continue his life of crime.

Hulk, in the bandaged disguise of "Bob Danner", plays baseball for the Florida Pistols when they compete against the Miami Emperors. One player on the Miami Emperors turns out to be Rhino under the alias Alex O'Hirn. A fight soon happens between both teams; the baseball players leave the field when they find out how strong Danner and O'Hirn are.

=== Civil War and aftermath ===
When the Rhino accidentally kills a security guard during a bank robbery, he is humiliated by the Punisher, and captured by Alyosha Kravinoff, the son of Kraven the Hunter. The Punisher rescues the Rhino from Kravinoff's superhuman zoo, and he is convinced to make amends. The Rhino sends a letter and money to the security guard's widow, and aids the Punisher on a case. Later, the Rhino persuades the Punisher not to kill Michael Watts, the third Stilt-Man.

During The Gauntlet storyline, the Rhino gives up his life of crime, surrendering himself to the police. S.H.I.E.L.D. removes his Rhino suit and sentences him to 25 years on Ryker's Island. He is released early on good behavior. Upon release, he meets Doctor Tramma in a restaurant who wants to reinvent the Rhino. Sytsevich declines upon developing a crush on the fired waitress Oksana and Tramma creates a new Rhino. At Spider-Man's persuasion, Sytsevich refuses to fight the new Rhino. That promise is broken when Sytsevich's wife Oksana is killed, and a grief-stricken Sytsevich kills the new Rhino.

Doctor Octopus recruits the Rhino for his iteration of the Sinister Six. During the Ends of the Earth storyline, the Rhino tells Spider-Man that the loss of Oksana has changed him, and he is prepared to die. When Octopus self-destructs his own lair, the Rhino pins Silver Sable to the floor of a flooding corridor, knowing that Spider-Man will blame himself for her death. He is presumed drowned, and while in Octopus' dying body, Spider-Man meets Oksana and the Rhino in the afterlife.

=== All-New, All-Different Marvel ===
As part of the lead-up to the Dead No More: The Clone Conspiracy storyline, the Rhino resurfaces, having survived his apparent demise. The Jackal finds Sytsevich in hiding in Tahuexco, Guatemala, where he persuades the Rhino to do his bidding with the promise of a revived Oksana. When Doctor Octopus activates a virus in all of the Jackal's clones that causes them to rapidly decay, Oksana turns to dust, and the Rhino goes on a grief-stricken rampage. Spider-Man calms him by convincing him to move forward for Oksana's sake, and the two agree to see each other once in a while to help the other with their pain.

In a prelude to the "Hunted" storyline, the Rhino is among the animal-themed characters who are captured and forced to participate in Kraven the Hunter's Great Hunt as hunting targets. He is grouped with several other captives, who are publicly revealed as the Savage Six.

In the storyline "King in Black", Rhino is among the villains recruited by Mayor Wilson Fisk to be part of his Thunderbolts at the time of Knull's invasion. During the "Devil's Reign" storyline, Rhino appears as a member of Wilson Fisk's Thunderbolts when Fisk passes a law that forbids superhero activities. In truth, Rhino did not sign up to dispose underage superheroes after learning the Kamala's Law incidents in Outlawed and its conclusion in Killer App. He secretly helps the Champions by giving them the Thunderbolts badge.

== Powers and abilities ==
A series of mutagenic chemical and radiation treatments provide the Rhino with superhuman strength, stamina, durability, and speed, all which were further augmented by gamma rays. His incredible speed allows him to run at high velocities, especially over short distances. Sytsevich frequently "charges" his opponents in this manner, enabling him to cause great harm to most enemies in the surrounding area. He is known for his lack of agility and slow reaction time, which makes it difficult for him to change direction when running at high speeds. As such, his fighting style is focused more on melee attacks.

=== Rhino suit ===
Sytsevich possesses a thick polymer suit that resembles the physique of a rhinoceros, including two horns, and covers everything but his face. The suit is resistant to damage and extreme temperatures and these horns are capable of penetrating two-inch plate steel. His first, cruder suit was originally bonded to his skin during a rocket crash and he went through several attempts to remove it.

After the first suit's destruction, Justin Hammer created a second, removable iteration with improved strength and durability.

== Other characters named Rhino ==
A man named Ryan O'Smith was experimented on by an unnamed mad scientist, which gave him flight. Intending to become a superhero, O'Smith is targeted by the original Rhino which led to O'Smith and Spider-Man defeating Rhino.

== Reception ==
- In 2020, CBR.com ranked Rhino 2nd in their "10 Most Powerful Members of the Sinister Syndicate" list.
- In 2022, Screen Rant ranked Rhino 8th in their "10 Most Powerful Silk Villains In Marvel Comics" list.

== Other versions ==
Many alternate universe versions of Rhino have appeared throughout the character's publication history.

=== Age of Apocalypse ===
In Age of Apocalypse, Rhino is a rhinoceros-like Inhuman.

=== Amazing Spider-Man: Renew Your Vows ===
In The Amazing Spider-Man: Renew Your Vows, Rhino is an enforcer for Regent.

=== Earth-001 ===
In Spider-Verse, the Earth-001 version of Rhino is a member of Verna's Hounds.

=== Marvel Mangaverse ===
In Marvel Mangaverse, Rhino is a member of the Kishi Kuri clan.

=== Ultimate Marvel ===
In the Ultimate Marvel universe, Rhino is Alex O'Hirn, a scientist who uses a stolen military suit called the R.H.I.N.O. (Robotism Heuristic Intelligence Navigable Operative).

== In other media ==
=== Television ===
- The Rhino appears in Spider-Man (1967), voiced by Ed McNamara.
- The Rhino appears in Spider-Man: The Animated Series, voiced by Don Stark. This version works for the Kingpin as a member of his Insidious Six.
- The Alex O'Hirn incarnation of the Rhino appears in The Spectacular Spider-Man, voiced by Clancy Brown. This version was originally a thug working under Tombstone and as Flint Marko's partner in crime who was used as a guinea pig in Norman Osborn's illegal experiments and infused with Dr. Otto Octavius' titanium resin armor. Christening himself the Rhino, O'Hirn's armor makes him physically powerful, but it obstructs his pores, forcing him to periodically re-hydrate. Following his first fight with Spider-Man, the Rhino goes on to join two incarnations of the Sinister Six before he is eventually captured.
- The Alex O'Hirn incarnation of the Rhino appears in Ultimate Spider-Man (2012), voiced by Max Mittelman and Daryl Sabara respectively. This version is a teenager and student of Midtown High School whose powers are derived from a serum created by Doctor Octopus that allows him to transform into an anthropomorphic rhinoceros. He later joins the Sinister Six until Spider-Man eventually persuades him to join the S.H.I.E.L.D. Academy and use his powers for good.
- The Aleksei Sytsevich incarnation of the Rhino appears in Spider-Man (2017), voiced primarily by Matthew Mercer, and briefly voiced by Ben Pronsky in the episode "Dead Man's Party". This version is a student at Horizon High who is secretly injected with rhino serum by Raymond Warren. Additionally, while in his Rhino form, Sytsevich has poor eyesight like an actual rhinoceros.
- The Rhino appears in Spidey and His Amazing Friends, voiced by Justin Shenkarow.

=== Film ===
- The Aleksei Sytsevich incarnation of the Rhino appears in The Amazing Spider-Man 2 (2014), portrayed by Paul Giamatti. This version is a dim-witted and boastful member of the Russian mafia. After being foiled by Spider-Man while attempting to steal Oscorp plutonium and being incarcerated, Gustav Fiers grants Sytsevich a rhinoceros-themed mecha armed with forearm-mounted heavy machine guns and shoulder-mounted missile launchers. In an interview with Entertainment Weekly, visual effects supervisor Jerome Chen stated that the armor was created from modified 1980s Soviet-era military gear.
  - Giamatti confirmed that the Rhino was planned to return in a third The Amazing Spider-Man film before the franchise was cancelled.
- Two alternate universe-displaced incarnations of the Rhino make non-speaking cameo appearances in Spider-Man: Across the Spider-Verse as prisoners of the Spider-Society.
- The Aleksei Sytsevich incarnation of the Rhino appears in Kraven the Hunter (2024), portrayed by Alessandro Nivola. This version is a Russian mercenary and former associate of Nikolai Kravinoff who gains the ability to transform into a rhino/human hybrid and controls the involuntary transformation by injecting himself with doses of an experimental serum provided to him by Dr. Miles Warren.

=== Video games ===
- The Rhino appears in Spider-Man (2000), voiced by Dee Bradley Baker.
- The Rhino appears as a boss in Spider-Man 2 (2004), voiced by John DiMaggio.
- The Alex O'Hirn incarnation of the R.H.I.N.O. appears as a boss in Ultimate Spider-Man (2005), voiced by Bob Glouberman.
- The Rhino appears as a mini-boss in Marvel: Ultimate Alliance, voiced by Peter Lurie. This version of the character is a member of Doctor Doom's Masters of Evil.
- The Rhino appears as a boss in Spider-Man 3, voiced by Steve Blum. This version has a condition that causes his skin to resemble an actual rhinoceros and wears a helmet resembling that of his traditional costume.
- The Rhino appears as a boss and playable character in Spider-Man: Friend or Foe, voiced again by John DiMaggio.
- The Rhino appears as an assist character in Spider-Man: Web of Shadows, voiced by Fred Tatasciore. Additionally, he appears as a boss in the PS2 and PSP versions.
- The Rhino appears in the Nintendo DS version of Spider-Man: Edge of Time, voiced again by Fred Tatasciore. This version takes Anti-Venom's place as the one who is inadvertently fused with Alchemax scientist Walker Sloan and Doctor Octopus to become the monstrous Atrocity (also voiced by Tatasciore).
- The Aleksei Sytsevich incarnation of the Rhino appears as a boss in The Amazing Spider-Man, voiced again by Fred Tatasciore. This version is a genetic hybrid of Sytsevich and a rhinoceros created by a corrupt Oscorp scientist using gene-splicing technology with the intention of selling it to a Russian crime syndicate as a living weapon. Additionally, the Rhino appears as a playable character in the Rhino Challenge DLC pack.
- The Rhino appears as a playable character in Lego Marvel Super Heroes, voiced by Robin Atkin Downes.
- The Aleksei Sytsevich incarnation of the Rhino appears as a boss in the mobile version of The Amazing Spider-Man 2 tie-in game, voiced again by Robin Atkin Downes. This version is initially a small-time criminal before donning rhinoceros-themed armor. Additionally, the Rhino armor from the film also appears as an Easter egg in the other versions of the game.
- The Rhino appears in Marvel Strike Force as a member of the Sinister Six.
- The Aleksei Sytsevich incarnation of the Rhino appears in Insomniac's Spider-Man series, voiced once again by Fred Tatasciore. This version is a former enforcer for the Russian Mob clad in an experimental and irremovable rhinoceros-themed combat suit that increases his strength. Within the games' continuity, Spider-Man has been a superhero for eight years and is well-familiar with the Rhino, having fought him several times in the past.
  - The Rhino first appears as a boss in Spider-Man (2018). He is initially imprisoned in the Raft before Doctor Octopus breaks him out and recruits him into his Sinister Six in exchange for the latter removing his armor. After defeating Spider-Man, the Sinister Six split up to attack various Oscorp properties, with the Rhino being sent to attack the company's welfare centers. He is later joined in this endeavor by the Scorpion and reluctantly works with him until they are both defeated by Spider-Man and returned to police custody.
  - The Rhino returns as a boss in Spider-Man: Miles Morales. Following a failed escape attempt amidst a prison transfer to the Raft, he is defeated by the new Spider-Man and ends up in Roxxon's custody. After receiving new armor that is more resistant to Spider-Man's bio-electric abilities, the company recruits him to capture Spider-Man and the Tinkerer, only to be defeated by the pair and severely wounded by the latter.

=== Miscellaneous ===
- The Rhino appears in Spider-Man: The Darkest Hours, by Jim Butcher. After being forced to ally with Spider-Man against Morlun's family, the two foes gain a deeper respect for one another.
- The Rhino appears in Marvel Universe Live! as a member of the Sinister Six.

=== Merchandise ===
- The Rhino received several action figures in Toy Biz's Spider-Man: The Animated Series tie-in line, Spider-Man Classics line, and Marvel Legends series. The Spider-Man Classics figure was later repainted and reissued by Hasbro.
- The Rhino received a mini-bust from Art Asylum as part of their Rogues Gallery collection.
- The Rhino received a bust and statue from Bowen Designs.
- The Rhino received a comiquette statue from Sideshow Collectibles.
