= Spider-Man Classics =

Term for action figure lines by Toy Biz

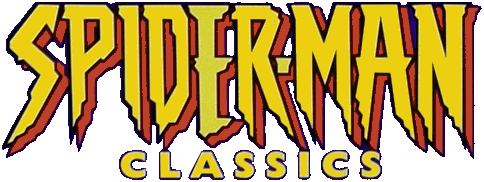
- Type: Action figures
- Invented by: Marvel Comics
- Company: Toy Biz
- Country: United States
- Availability: 2001–05
- Materials: Plastic
- Features: Spider-Man and cast

Spider-Man Classics is a term used by collectors most commonly to refer to several action figure lines produced by Toy Biz. The lines focus on Spider-Man and his allies and enemies.

The lines have over 17 series, with dozens of Spider-Man incarnations and many of his famous enemies. The toyline lasted 5 years starting from 2001 to 2005. A year later, ToyBiz released a new series titled "The Amazing Spider-Man". That same year, by changing the license from Marvel at the hands of Hasbro, they released Spider-Man Origins. In 2008, Hasbro released a reboot of Spider-Man Classics simply called "Spider-Man".

== History ==
The Spider-Man Classics line was released in 2001, and was the first 6" scale line of its kind to be produced by ToyBiz with highly detailed and articulated figures. Toybiz's ambitions for the line were intended to aim figures towards adult collectors as well as kids. The line consisted of two series plus several exclusives and had clamshell packaging inclusive of a comic book copy or poster significant to the figure. The line then changed no longer using the purple 'Spider-Man Classics' logo and appealed more towards kids with similarly scaled and articulated figures for the adult collector but usually including a gimmick of some sort with smaller packaging less the comic book. ToyBiz then continued the concept of clamshell packaging with inclusive comic book for their Marvel Legends line in 2002.

Previous to the 6" line released in 2001 with clamshell packaging, Toybiz had used the 'Spider-Man Classics' logo for 5" scale figures with less articulation for a series of 2 packs as well as a series titled 'Spider-Man Classics Water Wars'.

== Spider-Man Classics ==
Series	Year	Figure	Accessories	Description
1	2001	Spider-Man	Round base of Spider-Man's mask with a camera webbed to the lower right	Based on the art of Todd McFarlane
1	2001	Spider-Man	Base of a brick wall with a symbiote crawling on him	Symbiote costume
1	2001	Spider-Man	Base of a river	Man-Spider (Spider-Man mutated)
1	2001	Venom	Defeated Sentry of the Jury base	Mid-transformation pose
2	2001	Spider-Man	Base of a Daily Bugle billboard with webs on it	First appearance
2	2001	Spider-Man	Defeated Lizard base	Battle ravaged
2	2001	Daredevil	Base of church window	Red
2	2001	Daredevil	Base of church window	First appearance (brown/yellow)
2	2001	Rhino	Base of a torn-up street	
KayBee Toys Exclusive		Spider-Man 2099	Base of a brick wall with graffiti written: "Spidey was here!"	
KayBee Toys Exclusive		Scarlet Spider	iIcludes exact base as Spider-Man	

With the series' success, it was spun-off into Marvel Legends. At that point, the toyline ended and was replaced by a new one simply called Spider-Man on the packaging but "Spider-Man Classic" (notice the singular form) on ToyBiz's website. The new line has blister card packaging, and no comics are included.

Many of these Spider-Man costumes have not been worn in the comic books. Many of the Spider-Man figures contain many points of articulation, including lateral slides and pull outs, torso hinges (or in the case of Snap-Shot and Black Costume Spider-Man, ball joint and hinges), and individualized fingers.

== Spider-Man Classic ==
Beginning with Series 16, the logo design on the packaging was changed to "Amazing Spider-Man," but Toy Biz kept the series numbering and "Spider-Man Classic" identification on their website.

Series	Year	Figure	Accessories	Description
1	2002	Doctor Octopus		
1	2002	Lizard		
1	2002	Spider-Man	J. Jonah Jameson display base	Magnetic
1	2002	Spider-Man	Working float	Web Splasher
2	2003	Hobgoblin	Glider, removable cape and hood	Jason Macendale version with super poseability
2	2003	Spider-Man	Catapult	
2	2003	Spider-Man	Water webs	Water squirting
2	2003	Spider-Man		Web climbing
3	2003	Spider-Man	Sticky web	Super-poseable
3	2003	Spider-Man	Crate	Flip and swing with crate-kicking action
3	2003	Spider-Man	Drop Attack Web Swing	Spider-Sense with light-up eyes
4	2003	Spider-Man		Wall-crawling action
4	2003	Spider-Man		Spider-Sense
4	2003	Spider-Man		Spider-Strength
4	2003	Venom	Alien Ooze	Retool of the "Planet of the Symbiotes" Lasher figure with new head and limb parts
5	2003	Morbius		
5	2003	Spider-Man		Manga
5	2003	Spider-Man	SCUBA equipment	SCUBA Splash
5	2003	Spider-Man		Super-poseable
6	2003	Daredevil		Stunt
6	2003	Kraven the Hunter		
6	2003	Spider-Man	Parachute	
6	2003	Spider-Man	Rocket launcher	
7	2003	Green Goblin		Based on the art of Humberto Ramos
7	2003	Peter Parker		Spider-Man
7	2003	Spider-Man		Flip-N-Zip (based on the art of Humberto Ramos)
7	2003	Spider-Man		Magnetic
8	2004	Carnage		
8	2004	Ben Reilly		Web Attack (Spider-Man 2 costume)
8	2004	Spider-Man		Spider-Sense attack
8	2004	Spider-Man		Street fighting
9	2004	Ultimate Rhino		
9	2004	Spider-Man		Cyber
9	2004	Spider-Man		Secret Identity (Ultimate incarnation)
9	2004	Spider-Man	Missile-launching glider	Symbiote costume
10	2004	Lizard		Tail attack (based roughly on Ultimate incarnation)
10	2004	Spider-Man		Snap-Shot (based on the art of John Romita Sr.)
10	2004	Spider-Man		Super Jab
10	2004	Spider-Man	Web Line	
11	2004	Scorpion		Tail strike (modern appearances)
11	2004	Spider-Man		Shoot-N-Trap
11	2004	Spider-Man		Sneak attack
11	2004	Spider-Man		Triple Web Threat
12	2004	Lizard		Traditional appearance (rerelease)
12	2004	Sandman		
12	2004	Spider-Man		Dual-Web swinging
12	2004	Spider-Man		Hydro-Blast
12	2004	Spider-Man		Super-poseable wall-crawling (based on the art of J. Scott Campbell)
12	2004	Venom		Rerelease
13	2005	Mysterio		
13	2005	Spider-Man		Aqua Blast
13	2005	Spider-Man		Flip and Stick
13	2005	Spider-Man		Soak and Toss
14	2005	Beetle		Leila Davis
14	2005	Scorpion		First appearance (metallic suit and green mouth area)
14	2005	Spider-Man		Spin and Trap (Spider-Man Unlimited costume)
14	2005	Spider-Man	Web Trap	Spider-Armor costume
15	2005	Doctor Octopus	Web Splasher	Ultimate incarnation
15	2005	Ultimate Rhino		Rerelease
15	2005	Spider-Man		Hurricane Kick
15	2005	Spider-Man		Rocket Blast
15	2005	Spider-Man		Super Stunt
16	2006	Man-Wolf	Backpack	Jaw snarl and electronic sounds
16	2006	Spider-Man		Battle Action
16	2006	Spider-Man	Shark Trap	
16	2006	Spider-Man		Super Strength (different action than the Spider-Man Classics)
16	2006	Venom		Symbiote Blast
17	2006	Hobgoblin		Roderick Kingsley
17	2006	Hydro-Man	Interchangeable water spout/legs	
17	2006	Sandman		Rerelease
17	2006	Spider-Hulk	Breakable girder	
17	2006	Spider-Man		Shoot 'n Spin
17	2006	Spider-Man	Web Splasher	
18	2006	Mad Jack		Flame and Launch (based on Jack O'Lantern 3's second costume)
18	2006	Shocker	Missile projectiles	
18	2006	Spider-Man		Spider-Sense (House of M version)
18	2006	Spider-Man		Super Kick
18	2006	Venom		Stealth (clear coloring)
19	2006	Electro	Lightning missiles	
19	2006	Spider-Man		Quick Change
19	2006	Spider-Man		Sneak Attack
19	2006	Spider-Man		Web Climbing
19	2006	Toxin		

=== 5" Spider-Man Classics Vs Packs ===
Name	Figure	Description
Spider-Man Versus Hobgoblin	Hobgoblin	
Spider-Man Versus Hobgoblin	Spider-Man	Concept suit from Spider-Man film
Spider-Man Versus Scorpion	Scorpion	
Spider-Man Versus Scorpion	Spider-Man	Battle-ravaged
Venom Versus Carnage	Carnage	
Venom Versus Carnage	Venom	
Spider-Man II Versus Venom	Ben Reilly	
Spider-Man II Versus Venom	Venom	Based on Web of Spider-Man #118

=== Spider-Man Classic Clashes Packs ===
Name	Figure	Description
Spider-Man Versus Abomination	Abomination	comic appearance
Spider-Man Versus Abomination	Spider-Man	
Spider-Man Versus Absorbing Man	Absorbing Man	Based on The Amazing Spider-Man #429
Spider-Man Versus Absorbing Man	Spider-Man	Spider-Man Versus Doctor Octopus
Spider-Man		Spider-Man Versus Doctor Octopus

=== Villain Series (2005) ===
ToyBiz rereleased figures from the Spider-Man line.

Figure	Description
Carnage	
Green Goblin	
Lizard	Tail Attack
Morbius	
Rhino	Ultimate incarnation
Scorpion	Tail Strike

== Spider-Man Classics: Movie Series ==
Series	Year	Figure	Accessories	Description
Spider-Man (2002)	2002	Spider-Man	Interactive gargoyle statue base	Super-poseable
Spider-Man (2002)	2002	Spider-Man	Base shaped like the abandoned building from the movie	Battle-ravaged
Spider-Man (2002)	2002	Norman Osborn	Talking chair with light-up goblin mask	3 phrases (laughing, "can the Spider-Man come out to play", "this world will be yours and mine")
Spider-Man (2002)	2002	Green Goblin	Glider, removable mask	Super-poseable
Spider-Man (2002)	2002	J. Jonah Jameson	Desk and chair accessories	Desk pounding action
Spider-Man (2002)	2002	Spider-Man	Interactive base of a NYC street corner with streetlight	Web-swinging
Spider-Man (2002)	2002	Spider-Man	Interactive dumpster base	Leaping
Spider-Man (2002)	2002	Peter Parker	Interactive shelf and school accessories	Web squirting action
Spider-Man (2002)	2002	Mary Jane Watson	Interactive base	Collapsing base
Spider-Man (2002)	2002	Green Goblin	Glider with firing action	Pumpkin bombs
Spider-Man (2002)	2002	Spider-Man	Interactive zipline accessories	Power punch
Spider-Man (2002)	2002	Spider-Man	Interchangeable wrestler clothes	Wrestler
Spider-Man (2002)	2002	Green Goblin	Interactive base	Battle-ravaged
Spider-Man 2	2004	Spider-Man	Magnetic flag base	Magnetic
Spider-Man 2	2004	Spider-Man	Web shooting and water tower base	Twist and shoot
Spider-Man 2	2004	Spider-Man	Web hammock with lightpost base	Web trap
Spider-Man 2	2004	Spider-Man	Bendy webs	Web Climbing
Spider-Man 2	2004	Spider-Man	Streetlight base	Aerial Flipping
Spider-Man 2	2004	Spider-Man	Billboard base with zipline	Shoot and slide
Spider-Man 2	2004	Spider-Man	J. Jonah Jameson punching bag	Rapid Punch
Spider-Man 2	2004	Spider-Man	Billboard base	Super-Poseable
Spider-Man 2	2004	Spider-Man	Working web shooter	18-inch ultimate poseable figure
Spider-Man 2	2004	Doctor Octopus	Removable glasses	Tentacle attack
Spider-Man 2	2004	Spider-Man	Web projectiles	Web shooting
Spider-Man 2	2004	Spider-Man	Base with Doctor Octopus tentacles	Spin and kick
Spider-Man 2	2004	Spider-Man	Doctor Octopus wall base	Battle Attack
Spider-Man 2	2004	Doctor Octopus	Removable glasses	Tentacles
Spider-Man 2	2004	Spider-Man	Pizza scooter and interchangeable head	scooter
Spider-Man 2	2004	Spider-Man	Light-up base	Spider-Sense
Spider-Man 2	2004	Spider-Man	Magnetic billboard base	Magnetic
Spider-Man Trilogy	2008	Spider-Man	Interactive gargoyle base	Super-poseable Reprint of the Toy Biz Spider-Man 1 super-poseable figure
Spider-Man Trilogy	2008	Spider-Man	Web projectiles	Web shooting Reprint of the Toy Biz Spider-Man 2 twist n shoot Spider-Man
Spider-Man Trilogy	2008	Spider-Man	Crate accessories	Spinning kick Reprint of the Toy Biz Spider-Man 2 spin and kick Spider-Man
Spider-Man Trilogy	2008	Spider-Man	Suction cup web	Super-Poseable Reprint of the Marvel Legends Sandman Series Spider-Man
Spider-Man Trilogy	2008	Spider-Man	Webs	Glow in the dark web Reprint of the Spider-Man 2 super-poseable Spider-Man
Spider-Man Trilogy	2008	Spider-Man	Interchangeable wrestler clother	Wrestler Reprint of the Toy Biz Spider-Man 1 wrestler Spider-Man
Spider-Man Trilogy	2008	Black Suited Spider-Man	Catapult web	Catapult Attack Action Brand new 6 inch sculpt based on the 5 inch black suit Spider-Man figure
Spider-Man Trilogy	2008	Black Suited Spider-Man	Breakable Sandman base	Sandman Battling Action Reprint of the Spider-Man 3 basic series sand attack Spider-Man
Spider-Man Trilogy	2008	Black Suited Spider-Man	Suction cup web	Super-Poseable Reprint of the Marvel Legends Sandman Series black suit Spider-Man
Spider-Man Trilogy	2008	Spider-Man (half suit)	Suction web	Super-Poseable Repaint of the Marvel Legends Sandman Series black suit Spider-Man
Spider-Man Trilogy	2008	Green Goblin	Glider, removable mask	Removable mask Reprint of the Toy Biz Spider-Man 1 super poseable Green Goblin
Spider-Man Trilogy	2008	Doctor Octopus	Removable glasses and signpost weapon	With signpost weapon Reprint of the Toy Biz Spider-Man 2 bendable tentacle Doctor Octopus
Spider-Man Trilogy	2008	Sandman	Interchangeable sand hands	5 attack hands Reprint of the Marvel Legends Sandman Series Sandman
Spider-Man Trilogy	2008	Venom	2 capture webs	With Capture Webs Reprint of the Marvel Legends Sandman Series Venom
Spider-Man Trilogy	2008	New Goblin	Sky Stick, Sword and pumpkin bomb accessories	Figure rides sky stick Reprint of the Marvel Legends Sandman Series New Goblin
Spider-Man Trilogy	2008	Rhino	Log accessory	Smash Attack action Reprint of the Toy Biz Spider-Man Classics series 9 Rhino
Spider-Man Trilogy	2008	Shocker	Blast projectiles	Shockwave Vibration Reprint of the Toy Biz Amazing Spider-Man Shocker

== Spider-Man Origins (By Hasbro) ==
Hasbro re-released figures from ToyBiz in a metallic or repainted design and features new characters.

Series	Figure	Description
Heroes	Iron Spider	Could be Peter Parker, or any of the Scarlet Spiders
Heroes	Spider-Man	Hurricane Kick
Heroes	Spider-Man	Leap Action
Heroes	Spider-Man	Shoot-n-Grab
Heroes	Spider-Man	Symbiote costume
Heroes	Spider-Man 2099	
Villains	Demogoblin	flame glider
Villains	Doctor Octopus	
Villains	Lizard	
Villains	Mysterio	
Villains	Rhino	
Villains	Venom	

=== Battle Packs ===
Series	Figure	Description
Spider-Man vs Green Goblin	Spider-Man and Green Goblin	Reprints of the Leaping Spider-Man and the Super-Poseable Green Goblin from the first Toy Biz movie wave
Spider-Man vs Doctor Octopus	Spider-Man and Doctor Octopus	Reprints of the Super-Poseable Spider-Man and Bendable Tentacle Doctor Octopus from the Toy Biz Spider-Man 2 movie wave
Spider-Man vs Venom	Spider-Man and Venom	Brand new sculpts

== Spider-Man (By Hasbro, 2009) ==
- Spider-Man is a line by Hasbro that seems to focus more on children. Just like Spider-Man Origins, they repainted some ToyBiz figures, and also featured new characters.

Series	Figure	Accessories	Description
1	Green Goblin	Glider and pumpkin bombs	
1	Iron Spider	Posable combat claw	Metallic repaint of Origins
1	Spider-Man	Streetlight scene	Repaint of Series 12 (Super-poseable wall-crawling)
1	Tarantula	Breakable crates	
1	Venom		Mac Gargan version with jaw slash (repaint of Toy Biz Symbiote Blast)
2	Carnage	Capture webs	Repaint of the Marvel Legends Fearsome Foes box set Carnage
2	Juggernaut	Removable helmet	color variant
2	Spider-Man	Snap-on SCUBA wear	
2	Spider-Man	Wall sticking web	Black instead of blue variant
2	Spider-Man	Web missile launcher	Symbiote costume
2	Venom		Mac Gargan version with Scorpion Stinger
3	Green Goblin		
3	Spider-Man	Rocket Blast	
3	Spider-Man		Symbiote costume
3	Spider-Man	Web missile launcher	Symbiote costume (remake)
3	Spider-Man		Underwater mission (remake)
