= Midnighter and Apollo =

American comic book limited series

- Cover of Midnighter and Apollo #1. Art by ACO. The cover is an allusion to Midnighter #12.

Publication information
- Publisher: DC Comics
- Schedule: Monthly
- Format: Limited series
- Genre: Superhero
- Publication date: October 2016 – March 2017
- No. of issues: 6
- Main character(s): Midnighter; Apollo

Creative team
- Written by: Steve Orlando
- Artist: Fernando Blanco
- Letterer: Josh Reed
- Colorist(s): Romulo Fajardo, Jr.

Collected editions
- Midnighter and Apollo: ISBN 978-1-401-27201-2

Midnighter and Apollo is a six-issue American comic book limited series published by DC Comics. It is written by Steve Orlando and illustrated by Fernando Blanco, with covers by ACO. The series debuted in October 2016 and finished in March 2017. The story takes some time after the end of Midnighter, with Midnighter and Apollo having reunited. Following a battle with demons, Apollo's soul is dragged to Hell, and Midnighter attempts to bring him back.

The series was announced shortly after the cancellation of Midnighter, which came with the end of The New 52 continuity and the DC Rebirth relaunch. With this series, Orlando wanted to explore the romantic relationship between Midnighter and Apollo, as they had only recently gotten back together when Midnighter was cancelled. Orlando believed a comic focusing on the same-sex relationship of two superheroes was necessary. Due to the violent content and profanity within the comic, the series was rated T+ (+16). Reception towards the series has been overwhelmingly positive, being referred to as one of the best comics of 2016. Praise has been especially directed towards Midnighter's characterization, his relationship with Apollo, the storyline, and the artwork. However, Apollo's secondary role in comparison to Midnighter has been somewhat criticized.

== Development ==
The title was first announced as a six-issue series in June 2016, with the first issue released on October 5. On writing the series, Orlando stated that "Midnighter and Apollo is the book we need right now. Queer couple face down a new enemy and show us that we can never give in to fear, hatred, and evil—and they do it with their own brand of action-movie wit and punching". One of the things Orlando wanted to explore when writing the series is examining the beginnings of Midnighter and Apollo's relationship, due to they fact they had broken up and gotten back together.

== Plot ==
Midnighter and Apollo occurs after the previous Midnighter solo series. The story begins with the two men stopping a train that has children on board that have been abducted by a man named Captain Half-Beard and his crew. Following their victory, the two of them have dinner with their friends Tony and Marina. Once their friends leave, the two of them have sex, and Apollo questions Midnighter's method of killing his enemies. On the same night, Henry Bendix — the man who created Midnighter — sells the Ace of Winchesters, a magical rifle, to the Lords of the Gun, on the condition that they make Midnighter and Apollo suffer.

After searching for him for days, Midnighter manages to track Bendix to his hideout. Bendix, however, informs Midnighter that he has been expecting him and has sent a demon named Mawzir to fight Apollo, which manages to kill him and send his soul to Hell. Bendix gives Midnighter the option of either letting him go and saving Apollo by teleporting or killing him and being forced to fight his way out which will cost him time away from Apollo. Midnighter quickly kills him and fights his way out before he manages to use his teleportation door where he reaches Apollo and manages to fight off Mawzir.

Three days later, Midnighter goes to the magician Extraño for help. Extraño informs him that Apollo is being held in Hell by demons. Back in Hell, Apollo is being tormented with illusions by the demon-lord Neron.

== Collected editions ==
Title	Material collected	Release date	ISBN
Midnighter and Apollo	Midnighter and Apollo 1–6	July 25, 2017	978-1-401-27201-2

== Reception ==
=== Reviews ===
On review aggregator site Comic Book Round-Up, the first issue got an average score of 8.7/10, based on twelve critic reviews. Jesse Schedeen of IGN rated the first issue a score of 7.9 out of 10: "Steve Orlando's already enjoyable Midnighter comic is made even better now that Apollo is a central player. In many ways this book serves as a direct sequel to Midnighter, building on loose threads and escalating the conflict in a logical, organic way. Orlando shows a real flair for showcasing the weird, wacky side of the DCU while simultaneously keeping the focus on Midnighter's personal struggles and relationship with Apollo. The latter character doesn't see quite as deep a focus here, but hopefully that will change before the end of the series". C.K. Stewart of Newsarama gave the comic a score of 9 out of 10: "Midnighter and Apollo #1 is a strong debut issue for the miniseries, building on the world Orlando created in his groundbreaking Mindighter solo run but teasing a perhaps more supernaturally-imbued tale than we saw in Midnighter's first battle against the military industrial complex run amok". John Babos of Comic Nexu gave it a 7 out of 10: "This was a compelling debut issue with magic likely being able to harm to Apollo ala Superman. So that cliffhanger works. Solid, but at times a bit inaccessible, story and great art".

For the second issue, Schedeen gave it an 8.3 out of 10: "The book [celebrates] their bond even if it devotes most of its attention to Midnighter. He's at his most tough and bad-ass in this issue, even as his connection to Apollo puts him in an unusually vulnerable state (physically and emotionally). Steve Orlando packs this issue with just the right blend of humor, heart, weirdness and ultra-violence".

For issue three, Stewart gave it a high 10 out of 10 score: "Midnighter and Apollo #3 is the strongest issue yet, packing a powerful narrative into gorgeously illustrated pages. It's a gory but heartfelt romance, and a smart superhero update on a classic myth that captures the spirit of the tale without being so literal it broadcasts the ending upfront. It's riveting without being overwrought, and Orlando and Blanco leave enough light touches throughout to keep the book firmly planted in the camp of darkly humorous rather than just dark - the western turn the issue takes towards the end is a particularly nice touch".

For issue five, Schedeen gave an 8.0 out of 10 score: "At this point readers just have to accept that this series, despite its name, doesn't offer much in the way of Midnighter and Apollo actually interacting. It's a little too direct a continuation of the previous Midnighter book in that regard. But writer Steve Orlando does highlight the strong love that unites the two heroes, even if Apollo himself shares but a fraction of his lover's page time. This issue also showcases Midnighter at his most bad-ass". David Pepose of Newsarama gave it a score of 9 out of 10: "If there's one critique I might level against this series, it's that Midnighter's headstart against his boyfriend in the characterization department has only continued to increase since the first issue - for a title called Midnighter and Apollo, the latter character still doesn't feel as wonderfully defined as his dark, brooding and witty counterpart. But if having too much Midnighter is the worst complaint I can give, I think this book is still in the running for one of the best superhero titles of the week".

=== Accolades ===
The series was nominated for Outstanding Comic Book in 28th GLAAD Media Awards.
