= The Unexpected (2018 comic book) =

American superhero comic book by Steve Orlando

- Textless cover to The Unexpected #1 (June 2018), by Ryan Sook, featuring Neon, Viking Judge, Ascendant, and Firebrand.

Publication information
- Publisher: DC Comics
- Schedule: Monthly
- Format: Ongoing series
- Genre: Superhero
- Publication date: June 6, 2018 – January 9, 2019
- No. of issues: 8
- Main character(s): Firebrand; Neon the Unknown; Viking Judge; Ascendant

Creative team
- Written by: Steve Orlando
- Artist(s): Ryan Sook; Cary Nord

The Unexpected is an ongoing American superhero comic book written by Steve Orlando and published monthly by DC Comics. The series was part of the "New Age of DC Heroes" initiative, which launched following the conclusion of the Dark Nights: Metal crossover event, and began publication on June 6, 2018. It focuses on the titular team—consisting of Firebrand, Neon the Unknown, Viking Judge, and Ascendant—and follows their adventures, which relate to the events of Dark Nights: Metal and the Dark Multiverse.

DC planned to publish new titles following the conclusion of Dark Nights: Metal since 2017, under the "Dark Matter" initiative, with the titles connecting to the events of the crossover, with one of them being The Unexpected. The initiative was later renamed to "New Age of DC Heroes". According to Orlando, the titles core theme is discovery, describing it as a cross between "The Dark Tower and Seven Samurai", and deals with numerous aspects of DC's multiverse.

The series ended with its eighth issue.

== Plot ==
Former paramedic Janet Fals/Firebrand was killed during the invasion of the Dark Multiverse. After her body was released to Civil Solutions, they resurrected her by installing the Conflict Engine into her heart, which requires her to fight every 24 hours or she'll die. While working her shift at a VA hospital, she is attacked by Alden Quench/Bad Samaritan, who wishes to extract the Conflict Engine from her. During the attack, the Unexpected—Neon the Unknown, Viking Judge, and Ascendant—show up to help Firebrand. In the ensuing battle, Bad Samaritan manages to injure and draw blood from Neon, Ascendant, and Viking Judge, using the latter's ax, which he uses to hit Firebrand in the chest, causing an explosion that results in the deaths of himself, Ascendant, and Viking Judge. The explosion also creates a new isotope of metal.

== Development and publication history ==
=== Background and announcement ===
From June 2017 up to March 2018, DC Comics published Dark Nights: Metal, consisting of a six-issue limited series and various tie-ins. The story focused on Batman discovering the existence of the Dark Multiverse and fighting evil versions of himself led by the dark god Barbatos. Following the conclusion of Dark Nights: Metal, DC launched the "Dark Matter" initiative and debuted numerous new titles spinning off the event. In October, during the New York Comic Con the "Dark Matter" initiative had been rebranded to "The New Age of DC Heroes", with The Unexpected being one of the titles to debut. The series was written by Steve Orlando, with art by Ryan Sook.

=== Writing and characters ===
Orlando described the series as "The Dark Tower meets Seven Samurai" and focuses on new characters Janet Fals/Firebrand, Colin Nomi/Neon the Unknown, Turid Goldenaxe/Viking Judge, and Elligh/Ascendant. According to him, the titular team consists of people who are trying to atone for mistakes they made in the past, which they consider to be unforgivable. Orlando stated that Firebrand is The Unexpected's main connection to the events of Dark Nights: Metal, as she was a paramedic that got injured during the events of the crossover.

Besides the series' connection to the events of Dark Nights: Metal and the Dark Multiverse, Orlando said that The Unexpected also deals with the post-Flashpoint multiverse, Crisis on Infinite Earths, Infinite Crisis, and Final Crisis, showing how many of these stories are connected to each other. Additionally, one of the book's core themes is discovery.

Regarding the characters, Ryan Sook said that he designed them based on the descriptions he had received from Orlando and sent them to DC. While Firebrand's design remained the same throughout development, his original designs for Neon, Viking Judge, and Ascendant were all scrapped and went through various incarnations.

== Reception ==
=== Critical response ===
The Unexpected has received positive reviews from comics critics. At the review aggregator website Comic Book Roundup, which assigns a weighted mean rating out of 10 to reviews from comics critics, the series has received an average score of 7.5 based on 51 reviews.

=== Commercial performance ===
The Unexpected #1 debuted at 69th place on Diamond Comic Distributors' best-selling comics ranking for June 2018, with 28,028 copies distributed, being the 29th-best-selling DC comic book series published as well as the fourth-best-selling title by DC to debut in that month.

The second issue fell to 123rd place in July.
