= List of Scarlet Witch titles =

This is a list of titles featuring the Marvel Comics character Scarlet Witch/Wanda Maximoff. The character first appeared in The X-Men #4 (March 1964). She was later given her own series with Vision in November 1982. All stories presented in this list are published by Marvel Comics under their standard imprint, unless otherwise noted.

== Series ==
- The Vision and the Scarlet Witch #1–4 (August 1982 – November 1982).
  - Vision and the Scarlet Witch (vol. 2) #1–12 (July — November, 2025).
  - Vision and the Scarlet Witch (vol. 3) #1–5 (July — November, 2025).
- Scarlet Witch #1–4 (November 1993 – February 1994). The first solo series of Wanda Maximoff.
  - Scarlet Witch (vol. 2) #1–15 (December 2015 – February 2017).
  - Scarlet Witch (vol. 3) #1–10 (January 2023 – November 2023).
  - Scarlet Witch (vol. 4) #1–10 (August, 2024 — March, 2025).
- Scarlet Witch & Quicksilver #1–4 (February 2024 – May 2024). The limited series commemorates the 60th anniversary of the Maximoff siblings. It continues the storyline from Steve Orlando and Lorenzo Tammetta’s Scarlet Witch run.
- Sorcerer Supreme #1–4 (December 2025 – present). Scarlet Witch has become the new Sorcerer Supreme, embarking on adventures as "Earth’s primary mystical defender".
- Strange Tales (Vol.6) #1–4 ( December 8, 2025 – January 28, 2026). A limited series starring multiple "magic-based" characters, including Scarlet Witch and Nico Minoru.
- Strange Tails Infinity Comic #1–4 (December 19 2025 – January 9, 2026). The series is exclusively on Marvel Unlimited.

=== Other continuities ===
- House of Harkness #1–12 (August 2024 – November 2024). The series is an alternate-universe story set outside the main continuity, reimagining Wanda Maximoff and Agatha Harkness as teenage rivals at an elite school of magic. It was released exclusively on Marvel Unlimited.

== One-shots ==
The following is a list of one-shot issues that are set within the mainstream continuity of Marvel Comics.

- Mystic Arcana: Scarlet Witch (August 2007).
- Avengers Origins: The Scarlet Witch & Quicksilver (November 2011). A one-shot that is part of the Avengers Origins book series, it explores the origin story of Scarlet Witch and her twin brother, Quicksilver.
- Who Is... The Scarlet Witch Infinity Comic (April 2022). The one-shot was released exclusively on Marvel Unlimited.
- Scarlet Witch Annual (June 2023). The one-shot marks the beginning of "Contest of Chaos," a crossover storyline that unfolds across several interconnected comic books.
- Darkhold is a 2021 crossover that unfolds through a series of one-shots: The Darkhold Alpha #1, The Darkhold: Blade #1, The Darkhold: Wasp #1, The Darkhold: Iron Man #1, The Darkhold: Black Bolt #1, The Darkhold: Spider-Man #1, and The Darkhold Omega #1. The series was later collected in a trade paperback of the same name. The story centers on Scarlet Witch’s attempts to prevent Doctor Doom from obtaining the Darkhold.

== Development ==
=== Scarlet Witch (2015) ===
James Robinson viewed his Scarlet Witch series as an anthology that follows Wanda Maximoff's evolution into an occult detective, focusing on her character while intentionally distancing her from the complexities of her past in the Marvel universe. He emphasized the portrayal of witchcraft as a reflection of powerful women, enriched by the contributions of female artists, and highlighted the importance of family, particularly her relationship with her brother Pietro Maximoff. The narrative incorporates authentic spells and magic, offering a grounded interpretation distinct from titles featuring characters like Doctor Strange. Robinson aimed to deepen Wanda Maximoff's character development through her global adventures, ultimately envisioning her growth as a journey toward confidence and mastery, leading to a stronger identity as a solitary heroine rather than a return to her previous alliances with the Avengers.

=== Scarlet Witch & Quicksilver (2024) ===
Steve Orlando said the Scarlet Witch & Quicksilver series features a dynamic narrative that pits the siblings against the Wizard and his newly formed army, the Frightful Four Hundred, driven by a formidable force in the Marvel Universe. The story delves into the Maximoffs' evolving relationship, particularly their complicated feelings toward their father, Magneto, highlighted by a letter containing his last wishes that influences their perspectives. Orlando emphasized the acknowledgment of their troubled histories and the emotional struggles stemming from their father's abuse, while Pietro Maximoff is portrayed with depth beyond his roles as Wanda Maximoff's twin or Magneto's son. The series features a Darkseid-level villain whose threat may extend to the multiverse, alongside striking visuals from artists Russell Dauterman and Lorenzo Tammetta. While primarily focused on the siblings, the narrative hints at potential appearances from other family members, such as their sister Polaris and possibly Billy and Tommy, as Orlando expressed enthusiasm for exploring their personal struggles, family dynamics, and external threats in a fresh and engaging way.

=== Scarlet Witch (2024) ===
Steve Orlando described Scarlet Witch #1 as possessing a "cataclysmic" atmosphere, emphasizing that Wanda Maximoff's actions and the confidence she has regained lead to a dramatic confrontation with a cosmic force that jeopardizes both her existence and the fate of the planet. He commended artist Jacopo Camagni for his striking and graceful illustrations, which effectively capture the beauty of the unusual aspects of Maximoff's journey. While Orlando has not yet confirmed the series' legacy numbering, he expressed optimism about its potential inclusion in the future. He underscored the significance of Maximoff's character development, suggesting that her struggles to assert her worth and independence are pivotal themes, and hinted at a new manifestation of her powers that will be unveiled later in the series.

== Reception – Series ==
=== Mainstream continuity ===
Marvel Comics announced that Scarlet Witch: The Complete Collection, Vision & Scarlet Witch: The Saga of Wanda and Vision, House of M, and Vision: The Complete Collection sold out in March 2021. The company also revealed that multiple comic books starring the Scarlet Witch sold out in June 2021.

==== The Vision & The Scarlet Witch (1982) ====
Diamond Comic Distributors reported that the Avengers: Vision and the Scarlet Witch trade paperback was the 162nd best-selling graphic novel in June 2010.

==== Scarlet Witch (2015) ====
Diamond Comic Distributors reported that Scarlet Witch #1 was the 29th best-selling comic book in December 2015. The Scarlet Witch TPB Vol 1 1: Witches Road trade paperback was the 27th best-selling graphic novel in July 2016. The Scarlet Witch TPB Vol 1 2: World of Witchcraft trade paperback was the 52nd best-selling graphic novel in January 2017.

==== Scarlet Witch (2023) ====
ComicHub reported that Scarlet Witch #1 was the 3rd best-selling comic book in January 2023. The ComicHub Top 200 Comic Books sales chart reflects sales data collected from the ComicHub system at comic shops across the globe that sell American comics. This report was created based on information from more than 125 stores that used the ComicHub system during the reporting period. The second issue was the 17th best-selling comic book in February 2023.

==== Scarlet Witch & Quicksilver (2024) ====
ComicHub reported that Scarlet Witch & Quicksilver #1 was the 23rd best-selling comic book in February 2024. The ComicHub Top 200 Comic Books sales chart reflects sales data collected from the ComicHub system at comic shops across the globe that sell American comics. This report was created based on information from more than 125 stores that used the ComicHub system during the reporting period.

==== Scarlet Witch (2024) ====
ComicHub reported that Scarlet Witch & Quicksilver #1 was the 22nd best-selling comic book in June 2024. The ComicHub Top 200 Comic Books sales chart reflects sales data collected from the ComicHub system at comic shops across the globe that sell American comics. This report was created based on information from more than 125 stores that used the ComicHub system during the reporting period. The second issue was the 67th best-selling comic book in July 2024.

== Reception – One-Shots ==
=== Mainstream continuity ===
==== Mystic Arcana: Scarlet Witch (2007) ====
Diamond Comic Distributors reported that Mystic Arcana: Scarlet Witch #1 was the 108th best-selling comic book in August 2007.

==== Avengers Origins: Scarlet Witch and Quicksilver (2011) ====
Diamond Comic Distributors reported that Avengers Origins: Scarlet Witch and Quicksilver #1 was the 148th best-selling comic book in November 2011.

==== Scarlet Witch Annual (2024) ====
ComicHub reported that Scarlet Witch Annual #1 was the 44th best-selling comic book in June 2023. The ComicHub Top 200 Comic Books sales chart reflects sales data collected from the ComicHub system at comic shops across the globe that sell American comics. This report was created based on information from more than 125 stores that used the ComicHub system during the reporting period.

== Collected editions ==
The Scarlet Witch's solo appearances have been collected in a number of trade paperbacks:

Title	Material collected	Publication date	ISBN
Volume 1 (1900s)
The Avengers: Scarlet Witch	Scarlet Witch (Vol. 1) #1–4, Avengers Origins: Scarlet Witch & Quicksilver #1, material from Marvel Team-Up (1972) #125, Solo Avengers #5, Marvel Comics Presents (1988) #60–63 and #143–144, Mystic Arcana: Scarlet Witch	January 2015	9780785193357
Volume 2 (2016–2017)
Scarlet Witch Vol 1: Witches' Road	Scarlet Witch (vol. 2) #1–5	July 2016	978-0785196822
Scarlet Witch Vol 2: World of Witchcraft	Scarlet Witch (vol. 2) #6-10	January 2017	978-0785196839
Scarlet Witch Vol 3: The Final Hex	Scarlet Witch (vol. 2) #11-15	May 2017	978-1302902667
Scarlet Witch By James Robinson: The Complete Collection	Scarlet Witch (vol. 2) #1-15, Doctor Strange: The Last Days of Magic (2016) #1	February 2021	978-1302927387
Volume 3 (2023–2024)
Scarlet Witch Vol 1: The Last Door	Scarlet Witch (vol. 3) #1-5, Scarlet Witch Annual #1	August 2023	978-0785194743
Scarlet Witch Vol 2: Magnum Opus	Scarlet Witch (vol. 3) #6-10	February 2024	978-1302954895
Volume 4 (2024–2024)
Scarlet Witch, Vol. 4: Queen of Chaos	Scarlet Witch (Vol. 4) #1-5 Crypt of Shadows (Vol. 4) #1	February 2025	9781302957476
Scarlet Witch, Vol. 5: Amaranth Rising	Scarlet Witch (Vol. 4) #6-10	July 2025	9781302961039
The Vision and the Scarlet Witch (1982–2025)
Avengers: Vision and the Scarlet Witch	Giant-Size Avengers #4 and Vision and the Scarlet Witch (vol. 1) #1-4	December 3, 2020	978-1846532887
Vision & the Scarlet Witch - The Saga of Wanda and Vision	Giant-Size Avengers #4, Vision and the Scarlet Witch (vol. 1) #1-4, Vision and the Scarlet Witch (vol. 2) #1-12 and West Coast Avengers #2	January 26, 2021	978-1302928643
Avengers: Vision & The Scarlet Witch - A Year In The Life	Vision and the Scarlet Witch (vol. 2) #1-12 and West Coast Avengers #2	December 20, 2022	978-1302927417
The Vision & The Scarlet Witch: Fear the Reaper	The Vision & The Scarlet Witch (Vol. 3) #1-5	January 2026	9781302964955
Scarlet Witch & Quicksilver (2024)
Scarlet Witch, Vol. 3: Scarlet Witch & Quicksilver	Scarlet Witch & Quicksilver (Vol. 1) 1-4, X-Men (1963) #4	October 2024	9781302957469
Other collections
Mystic Arcana	Mystic Arcana: Scarlet Witch and Mystic Arcana: Magik, Black Knight, Sister Grimm, Handbook; Official Tarot of the Marvel Universe	December 26, 2007	978-0785127192
Avengers: Mythos	Avengers Origins: Quicksilver &The Scarlet Witch and Mythos: Hulk, Captain America; Avengers Origins: Ant -Man & the Wasp, Luke Cage, Vision, Thor	January 1, 2013	978-0785148609
Avengers: Scarlet Witch by Dan Abnett & Andy Lanning	Scarlet Witch (vol. 1) #1-4, Avengers Origins: Scarlet Witch & Quicksilver; material from Marvel Team-Up #125; Solo Avengers #5; Marvel Comics Presents #60-63, 143-144 and Mystic Arcana: Scarlet Witch	April 14, 2015	978-0785193357
The Darkhold	The Darkhold Alpha (2021) #1, The Darkhold: Blade (2021) #1, The Darkhold: Wasp (2021) #1, The Darkhold: Iron Man (2021) #1, The Darkhold: Black Bolt (2021) #1, The Darkhold: Spider-Man (2021) #1, The Darkhold Omega (2020) #1.	March 2022	9781302925840
Marvel-Verse: Scarlet Witch	X-Men: First Class (2007) #9, Marvel Two-in-One (1974) #66, Doctor Strange (1974) #60, Vision and the Scarlet Witch (1985) #5, Material from X-Men: First Class (2007) #3 and #6 Marvel Team-Up (1972) #125, Women of Marvel (2022) #1	September 2024	9781302953249
Alternate versions
House of Harkness	House of Harkness Infinity Comic #1–15	July 2026	9781546146834
