= B.P.R.D. Hell on Earth =

- Publisher: Dark Horse Comics
- Publication date: August 2010 – November 2016
- Main character(s): Liz Sherman; Abe Sapien; Johann Kraus; Roger the Homunculus; Kate Corrigan

Creative team
- Writer(s): Mike Mignola; John Arcudi; Scott Allie
- Artist(s): Guy Davis; Tyler Crook; James Harren; Joe Querio; Laurence Campbell; Sebastián Fiumara
- Colorist: Dave Stewart
- Editor: Scott Allie

[[Category:Storylines in comics|]][[Category:2010 in comics|]]

"B.P.R.D. Hell on Earth" is a comic book storyline published by Dark Horse Comics. It is the second major story cycle in the B.P.R.D. series. Created by Mike Mignola and primarily written by Mignola and John Arcudi, the series picks up straight after the after the end of the "Plague of Frogs" arc and follows the Bureau for Paranormal Research and Defense as they deal with a global apocalypse triggered by the awakening of the Ogdru Hem.

== Plot summary ==
Following the "Plague of Frogs", the Bureau for Paranormal Research and Defense, now working as an international agency under U.N. oversight, face a new wave of disasters around the world. While investigating a cult, Abe Sapien is shot and critically injured by Fenix, a girl who can see the future. Liz Sherman, who has lost her powers and had been laying low in a trailer park, finds a cult developing around her and rejoins the B.P.R.D.

More incidences of Ogdru Hem are reported around the world, including in Scotland and Japan. The Bureau must partner with Special Sciences Service, the Russian of the B.P.R.D., as Johann Kraus and Kate Corrigan investigate a Russian town where a virus is mutating people into zombie-like creatures but can not contain it.

In New York, the Bureau fights through Ogdru Hem, monstrous creatures, and zombie-like humans to retrieve lost agents and information. Liz regains her powers during a siege.

The Black Flame is resurrected and seizes Manhattan using a combination of soldiers and demons to take control. A resistance led by S.S.S. Director Iosif Nichayko and B.P.R.D. agents attempt to stop him, leading to a devastating battle between Liz and the Black Flame.

Later missions reveal new methods of killing the Ogdru Hem. However, Johann's behaviour grows more erratic and his connection to experimental armor and past Bureau projects create mistrust between him and the rest of the team.

The Black Flame tests the limits of his power and conjures an Ogdru Jahad, a Lovecraftian creature that can spawn more monsters. After evacuating as many people as possible, Liz and Johann make a final stand. Using all their power, they stop the Ogdru Jahad, which turns the Ogdru Hem to stone and stop the destruction around the world. It is revealed that Johann sacrifices himself and what remains of the B.P.R.D. counts its losses.

== Critical reception ==
According to Comicbook Roundup, the entire storyline received an average rating of 8.3 out of 10 based on 284 reviews, which indicates positive reviews from critics. The story arc has been praised for expanding the Hellboy universe into a more ambitious and sustained apocalypse narrative. Reviewers have noted that, despite the increase in scope from previous stories, the series remained character-driven even as the stakes became global.

== Collected editions ==
Volume	Title	Material collected	Published date	ISBN
1	New World	New World #1–#5; Seattle (one-shot short story); Afterword by Mike Mignola; Sketchbook (8 pages)	August 17, 2011	978-1-59582-707-4
2	Gods and Monsters	Gods #1–#3; Monsters #1–#2; Sketchbook (19 pages)	January 11, 2012	978-1-59582-822-4
3	Russia	Russia #1–#5; An Unmarked Grave (short story); Sketchbook (24 pages)	August 15, 2012	978-1-59582-946-7
4	The Devil's Engine & The Long Death	The Devil's Engine #1–#3; The Long Death #1–#3; Sketchbook (27 pages)	December 5, 2012	978-1-59582-981-8
5	The Pickens County Horror & Others	The Pickens County Horror #1–#2; The Transformation of J.H. O'Donnell (one-shot); The Abyss of Time #1–#2; Sketchbook (30 pages)	July 17, 2013	978-1-61655-140-7
6	The Return of the Master	The Return of the Master #1–#5; Sketchbook (34 pages)	August 7, 2013	978-1-61655-193-3
7	A Cold Day in Hell	Wasteland #1–#3; A Cold Day in Hell #1–#2; Sketchbook (18 pages)	January 22, 2014	978-1-61655-199-5
8	Lake of Fire	Lake of Fire #1–#5; Sketchbook (18 pages)	April 9, 2014	978-1-61655-402-6
9	The Reign of the Black Flame	The Reign of the Black Flame #1–#5; Sketchbook (18 pages)	September 10, 2014	978-1-61655-471-2
10	The Devil's Wings	The Devil's Wings #1–#2; The Broken Equation #1–#2; Grind (one-shot); Sketchbook (22 pages)	March 18, 2015	978-1-61655-617-4
11	Flesh and Stone	Flesh and Stone #1–#5; Sketchbook (18 pages)	September 23, 2015	978-1-61655-762-1
12	Metamorphosis	Nowhere, Nothing, Never #1–#3; Modern Prometheus #1–#2; Sketchbook (18 pages)	December 23, 2015	978-1-61655-794-2
13	End of Days	End of Days #1–#5; Sketchbook (10 pages)	May 18, 2016	978-1-61655-910-6
14	The Exorcist	Exorcism #1–#2; The Exorcist #1–#3; Sketchbook (8 pages)	September 21, 2016	978-1-5067-0011-3
15	Cometh the Hour	Cometh the Hour #1–#5; Sketchbook (13 pages)	March 29, 2017	978-1-5067-0131-8
