= Robotika =

Robotika is an American comic series created by Alex Sheikman. Two collections have been printed, featuring the original story line and the "For a Few Rubles More" line. It is published by Archaia Studios Press.

== Plot synopsis ==
In the far future genetic engineering has become commonplace, and countless cyborgs are created and later cast off once new models are developed. The cyborgs live in desolation in the badlands, which resemble the old west.

Robotika centers around 3 main protagonists: Niko, Cherokee Geisha (C.G.) and Yuri Bronski. Niko, an emotionless mute, is an elite member of her majesty's secret service, specializing in Samurai Arts. He is put on assignment to find a stolen object: The world's first known completely artificial life form (which resembles a butterfly). The life form has been stolen by a major cyborg production company based in the badlands who fear that its invention will put them out of business. Niko ventures off into these uncivilized lands and comes across many an obstacle. He stumbles upon Cherokee Geisha (also a mute whose cyberkinetic modification is an artificial voice box, which sounds abnormal causing all her dialog to be written vertically) squaring off against a group of bandits. She takes them down in hand to hand combat and then challenges Niko thinking him one of them. He them throws an arrow head on the ground revealing he saved her from a hidden archer. She thanks him by buying him a drink and gives him some information on the whereabouts of the artificial butterfly. Niko heads off without a word and finds the company's hide out. He faces off against a group of modified security guards and easily dispatches of them. Inside the headquarters he finds hundreds of butterfly's, and meets a company officer who explains why he shouldn't take the company down. Cherokee then promptly arrives and begins mocking the company. Niko tosses a poison gas grenade and he and Cherokee put on gas masks while every butterfly dies, leaving only the artificial one. Niko and Cherokee part ways and Niko returns the butterfly to the queen, who impulsively kills it and wears it as a hair accessory. Disillusioned Niko makes a pacifist oath, never to use his sword again.

Meanwhile, while getting high, Cherokee is visited by a group of cultist pilgrims looking for a yojimbo (protection) to escort them on a pilgrimage to visit the "master of souls". They reveal they have already hired the haiku writing mercenary Yuri Bronski, who recommended CG. They request a third yojimbo and she decides to ask Niko.

Niko, still in a pacifist stage, receives two summons: One from the queen, the other from C.G. He decides to see CG and join the group.

On the way, the pilgrims run into a group of Geisha Warriors who refuse passage. At this point Niko's oath is revealed, upsetting CG, while Bronski stays calm. During the battle Niko takes down the attacking Geishas barehanded, while Bronski and CG fight alongside. They prevail and are permitted passage. They spend the night in a grove of mangrove trees.

During the night, Niko is visited by a Shaman spirit. The shaman explains that he made the grove grow by sacrificing a virgin and as punishment the towns people bound him to the grove to forever rot, undead in purgatory. He wishes to use Niko as a vessel for his soul, so he can take over the world. He allows Niko to pass on the promise of returning and tells him that he is not yet ready to carry the shaman spirit until he learns the truth about himself.

The pilgrims eventually arrive at the cave where the "Master of Souls" resides. CG and Bronski attempt to renegotiate a deal stipulating that they get paid more if they enter as well, but these negotiations are rendered futile when Niko leads them in for free. Inside the grotesque master awaits the pilgrims and upon their arrival he feasts upon their souls, bellowing "Nourish Me!" as they are all reduced to dust. Only Niko remains alive. He then attacks and slays the Master.

On the return journey the three Yojimbo's stop again at the Mangrove Trees. The shaman reveals the reason that Niko is a prefect vessel and the reason he survived the Master's attacks was because he has no soul. A series of flashbacks reveal that in fact he was the first ever artificial life form, created by the same demented scientist who created the butterfly. Upon realizing Niko had no soul the scientist wipes Niko's memory and decides to try again with something simpler "Maybe a butterfly". Even after this revelation, Niko refuses to become a vessel for the shaman and blows up the grove with a grenade.

The three yojimbos then set off on a journey to find a dueling competition of which the victor wins a mystical sword, rumoured to have a soul.

== For A Few Rubles More ==
A second volume was released focusing on the search for the competition. In it the three yojimbos become embroiled in a local drug war over a futuristic genetic drug called "tadpoles". In the ensuing conflict important players in the main characters past turn up, injecting added emotion to the conflict.

The title is a play on the spaghetti western For a Few Dollars More starring Clint Eastwood
