= Spider-Man's Tangled Web =

Comic book series

- Cover to Spider-Man's Tangled Web #1 (June 2001). Art by Glenn Fabry.

Publication information
- Publisher: Marvel Comics
- Schedule: Monthly
- Format: Ongoing
- Publication date: June 2001 - March 2003
- No. of issues: 22

Creative team
- Written by: various
- Artist: various

Spider-Man's Tangled Web was an American superhero comic book series starring Spider-Man and his supporting cast published by Marvel Comics for 22 issues from June 2001 to March 2003. The title was an anthology series, where various creative teams not usually associated with Spider-Man could display their take on the character.

== Creation ==
The series was devised by Joe Quesada and Axel Alonso shortly after they became Marvel Comics' editor-in-chief and senior editor respectively. Creators for the series were directed to focus more on the characters connected to Spider-Man rather than focusing on the character himself. A similar approach had previously been tried with Webspinners: Tales of Spider-Man in 1999–2000. However, Alonso's contacts from his work with DC Comics and their Vertigo imprint attracted a number of acclaimed creators to the series, including Darwyn Cooke, Garth Ennis, Duncan Fegredo, Jim Mahfood, Ted McKeever, Peter Milligan, Paul Pope and Greg Rucka. While the series was nominally set in the Marvel Universe, the creative teams were given considerably leeway in terms of how strongly they adhered to continuity.

== Publishing history ==
The series' title was initially styled as Tangled Web for the first four issues, with Spider-Man's name not featured on the cover. From #5 it was changed to Spider-Man's Tangled Web. Issue #1 was the subject of a recall due to the incorrect paper stock being used for the cover. A second print run was ordered with the correct paper stock, thus making a collector's item of the rarer first print.

Sales on the series lagged behind the other Spider-Man titles throughout its run, and it was finally cancelled in 2003 to make way for the new The Spectacular Spider-Man vol. 2 comic by Paul Jenkins and Humberto Ramos.

== Stories ==
- Issues #1-3: "The Coming of the Thousand" by Garth Ennis (w), John McCrea (p), James Hodgkins (i)

Peter Parker is targeted by former high-school bully Carl King, who knows that his old punching-bag became Spider-Man. However, King's attempt to replicate the accident that gave Peter his powers by ingesting the irradiated spider have instead turned him into the Thousand, a swarm of spiders carrying his consciousness and capable of taking over the skins of his victims.

- Issue #4: "Severance Package" by Greg Rucka (w), Eduardo Risso (a)

Tom Cochrane is a trusted and experienced lieutenant of the Kingpin. However, after an operation under his watch is foiled by Spider-Man he must prepare for the consequences of failing the crime lord.

- Issues #5-6: "Flowers for Rhino" by Peter Milligan (w), Duncan Fegredo (a)

A laughing-stock after repeated defeats at the hands of Spider-Man, Rhino undergoes intelligence enhancement to impress the daughter of a Russian mobster. However, he soon finds himself missing his simpler, stupider previous life.

- Issues #7-9: "Gentlemen's Agreement" by Bruce Jones (w), Lee Weeks (p), Joe Rubinstein (i)

Cab driver Charlie Clemmens discovers Spider-Man's secret identity, and must weigh up exposing the secret to pay his medical bills against the hero's safety.

- Issue #10: "Ray of Light" by Kaare Andrews (w), (a)

Two brothers watching the cartoon Insect-Man find themselves in the middle of a battle between Spider-Man and Electro.
- Andrews used an experimental digital painting process for the art in the story.

- Issue #11: "Open All Night" by Darwyn Cooke (w), (p), Jay Bone (i)

The staff of the Daily Bugle finish work on Valentine's Day, with reporters Jill and Kay both thinking they are going on a date with Peter Parker. Meanwhile, Spider-Man himself is recovering in a dumpster after a fight with the Vulture.

- Issue #12: "I was a Teenage Frogman" by Zeb Wells (w), Duncan Fegredo (a)

Eugene has to deal with being the son of loser super-villain Leap-Frog; his efforts to carve a more positive legacy as the hero Frog-Man are no more successful.

- Issue #13: "Double Shots" by Ron Zimmerman (w), Sean Phillips (a)

Alyosha Kravinoff, the Vulture and Norman Osborn trade stories about their encounters with Spider-Man at The Bar with No Name.

- Issue #14: "The Last Shoot" by Brian Azzarello (w), Scott Levy (w), Giuseppe Camuncoli (a)

Crusher Hogan's wrestling career is impacted by a bout with the 'Masked Marvel'.
- At the time the comic was made Levy was wrestling in the ECW under the name Raven.

- Issue #15: "The Collaborators" by Paul Pope (w), (a)

A teenage girl focuses on her admiration of Spider-Man to cope with her dysfunctional home life.

- Issues #16-17: "Heartbreaker" by Daniel Way (w), Leandro Fernandez (a)

After suffering a heart attack during a bank job, Tombstone is imprisoned along with several minor-league villains, including Kangaroo.
- The story has been criticised for its stereotypical representation of black people and homosexuals.

- Issue #18: "Alphabet City" by Ted McKeever (w), (a)

Minor league villain Typeface discovers even he has a nemesis - Spellcheck.

- Issue #19: "Call of the Wild" by Robbie Morrison (w), Jim Mahfood (a)

Grizzly finds himself tormented by the Rhino.

- Issue #20: "Behind the Mustache" by Zeb Wells (w), Dean Haspiel (a)

J. Jonah Jameson gets help with his anger management issues.

- Issue #21: "'Twas the Fight Before Christmas" by Darwyn Cooke (w), (p), Jay Bone (i)

Peter Parker and the Fantastic Four try to find Christmas gifts.

- Issue #22: "The System" by Brian Patrick Walsh (w), Alberto Dose (a)

Spider-Man's unorthodox crime-fighting creates difficulties for the police.

== Collected editions ==
#	Title	Material collected	Format	Pages	Released	ISBN
1	Spider-Man's Tangled Web Vol. 1	Tangled Web: The Thousand #1-4; Spider-Man's Tangled Web #5-6	TPB	144	19 Nov 2001	978-0785108030
2	Spider-Man's Tangled Web Vol. 2	Spider-Man's Tangled Web #7-11	TPB	128	15 Apr 2002	978-0785108740
3	Spider-Man's Tangled Web Vol. 3	Spider-Man's Tangled Web #12-17	TPB	160	28 Oct 2002	978-0785109518
4	Spider-Man's Tangled Web Vol. 4	Spider-Man's Tangled Web #18-22; Peter Parker: Spider-Man #42-43	TPB	176	31 Mar 2003	978-0785110644
	Spider-Man's Tangled Web Omnibus	Tangled Web: The Thousand #1-4; Spider-Man's Tangled Web #5-22	Omnibus	560	27 Jun 2017	978-1302906825

== Reception ==
In an overall series review before #20, Wizard rated Spider-Man's Tangled Web as 'B-', noting the format was "both the strength and weakness" of the title. Screen Rant considered it a title that was cancelled too early.

Wizard listed "Severance Package" as one of their 'Top 10 Books of the Last Decade'. "Severance Package" was named as one of the '10 Best Spider-Man & Kingpin Comics' by Comic Book Resources. Wizard also described "I was a Teenage Frogman" as "tepid".

"'Twas the Fight Before Christmas" was listed in Screen Rant's '10 Marvel Comics That Could Inspire Another MCU Holiday Special'

"Flowers for Rhino" was one of the most acclaimed stories from the series; Screen Rant named it among the '10 Best Comic Issues Of The 2000s' featuring Spider-Man; it was listed at 49th on Comic Book Resources' '50 Greatest Spider-Man Stories Master List'. and was named as one of the '10 Weirdest Spider-Man Comics' by Tilt Magazine, writer David Gelmini describing it as "an enjoyably offbeat insight into the psyche of the most imbecilic member of the Sinister Six". Comic Book Resources would also list it as a fine example of a villain-centric Spider-Man story.
