= Broken Frontier =

Comic book industry web-magazine

- Website type: Comic book
- Available in: English
- Owner: Andy Oliver
- Editor: Andy Oliver
- Website: www.brokenfrontier.com
- Registration: Yes
- Launched: 2002; 24 years ago

Broken Frontier is a web-magazine which publishes news, interviews, and essays about the comic book industry, with a focus on the British small press scene. It was founded by Frederik Hautain in 2002. In 2017 the site came under the ownership of long-term contributor and current Editor-in-Chief Andy Oliver.

== Acquisition by Platinum Studios ==
In 2006, Broken Frontier was purchased by the multimedia entertainment company and comics publisher Platinum Studios as part of an initiative to increase Platinum's Web presence. Broken Frontier was a fully owned subsidiary of Platinum at this time, but was given the autonomy to continue operating as before. However, in July 2007, Platinum terminated its association with Broken Frontier, leaving the site independently owned once again.

== The Frontiersman: Digital Comics Magazine ==
In 2010, Broken Frontier launched The Frontiersman, a companion to the Broken Frontier website which ran until 2012.

== Small Press Comics coverage ==
In 2013 Broken Frontier relaunched with an emphasis on the burgeoning small press and self-published comics scene, working to champion emerging voices in comics. In 2015 it launched its annual mentoring programme, spotlighting six new creators each year with the aim of bringing them to comics publisher attention. In 2020 its work in this area was acknowledged in the British newspaper the i, in an interview with UK Comics Laureate Hannah Berry. Later that year it was cited in the first national survey of UK comics creators, funded by Arts Council England, the British Council and the University of Dundee, as the most popular comics news site or periodical to access comic sector news and support.

Broken Frontier continues to support comics artists and associated organisations through its work in the comics community, including its media partnership with the East London Comics and Arts Festival (ELCAF) and co-organising the UK and Ireland's annual Small Press Day.
